= Alexandr Dolgopolov career statistics =

These are the career statistics for Ukrainian tennis player Alexandr Dolgopolov. All information is according to the ATP.

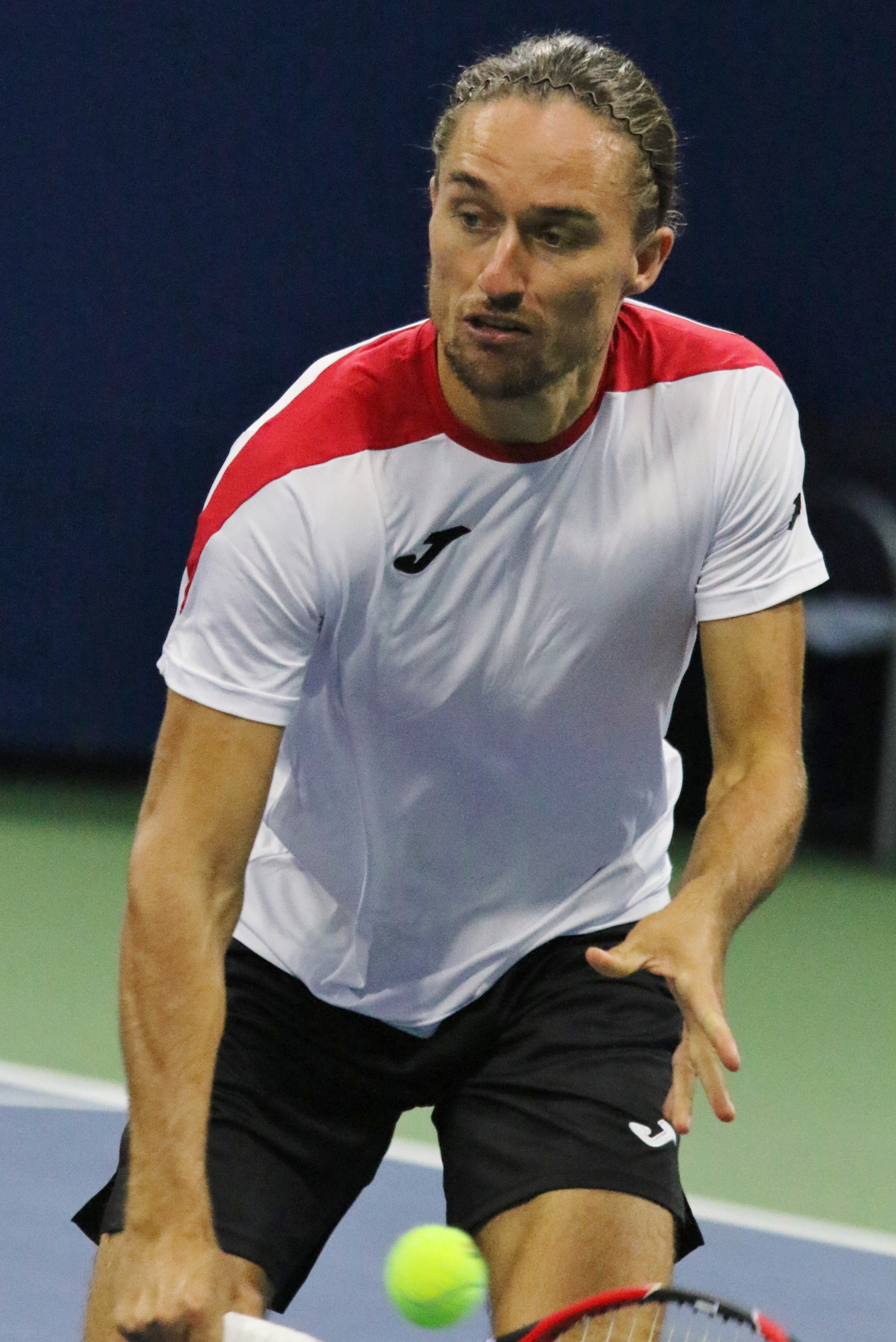
Dolgopolov at the 2016 US Open.

== Performance timelines ==
Key
W	F	SF	QF	#R	RR	Q#	P#	DNQ	A	Z#	PO	G	S	B	NMS	NTI	P	NH

(W) winner; (F) finalist; (SF) semifinalist; (QF) quarterfinalist; (#R) rounds 4, 3, 2, 1; (RR) round-robin stage; (Q#) qualification round; (P#) preliminary round; (DNQ) did not qualify; (A) absent; (Z#) Davis/Fed Cup Zonal Group (with number indication) or (PO) play-off; (G) gold, (S) silver or (B) bronze Olympic/Paralympic medal; (NMS) not a Masters tournament; (NTI) not a Tier I tournament; (P) postponed; (NH) not held; (SR) strike rate (events won / competed); (W–L) win–loss record.

=== Singles ===
Tournament	2006	2007	2008	2009	2010	2011	2012	2013	2014	2015	2016	2017	2018	SR	W–L	Win %
Grand Slam tournaments
Australian Open	A	Q1	Q3	Q2	Q1	QF	3R	1R	2R	1R	2R	2R	3R	0 / 8	11–8	58%
French Open	A	Q2	Q1	A	3R	3R	1R	1R	2R	1R	A	2R	A	0 / 7	6–7	46%
Wimbledon	A	A	A	A	2R	1R	2R	3R	3R	2R	2R	1R	A	0 / 8	8–8	50%
US Open	A	A	A	A	1R	4R	3R	2R	A	1R	1R	4R	A	0 / 7	9–7	56%
Win–loss	0–0	0–0	0–0	0–0	3–3	9–4	5–4	3–4	4–3	1–4	2–3	5–4	2–1	0 / 30	34–30	53%
ATP World Tour Masters 1000
Indian Wells Masters	A	A	A	A	A	3R	4R	2R	SF	3R	3R	2R	A	0 / 7	11–7	61%
Miami Masters	A	A	A	A	A	4R	3R	3R	QF	4R	3R	1R	A	0 / 7	11–7	61%
Monte Carlo Masters	A	A	A	A	1R	1R	3R	2R	2R	2R	A	A	A	0 / 6	5–6	45%
Madrid Masters	A	A	A	A	2R	1R	QF	1R	2R	A	2R	Q1	A	0 / 6	6–6	50%
Rome Masters	A	A	A	A	Q2	1R	1R	3R	1R	2R	1R	1R	1R	0 / 8	2–8	20%
Canada Masters	A	A	A	A	3R	2R	1R	2R	A	1R	1R	A	A	0 / 6	4–6	40%
Cincinnati Masters	A	A	A	A	1R	1R	1R	1R	A	SF	1R	2R	A	0 / 7	4–7	36%
Shanghai Masters	Not Held			A	2R	QF	3R	2R	1R	1R	A	3R	A	0 / 7	9–7	56%
Paris Masters	A	A	A	A	A	3R	1R	1R	1R	2R	A	A	A	0 / 5	2–5	29%
Win–loss	0–0	0–0	0–0	0–0	4–5	8–9	10–9	5–9	9–7	11–8	3–6	4–5	0–1	0 / 59	54–59	48%
National representation
Davis Cup	Z1	Z2	A	A	A	A	A	PO	A	Z1	A	A	A	0 / 0	5–3	63%
Career statistics
	2006	2007	2008	2009	2010	2011	2012	2013	2014	2015	2016	2017	2018	Career		
Tournaments	1	1	0	1	23	30	26	26	22	26	18	24	5	203		
Titles	0	0	0	0	0	1	1	0	0	0	0	1	0	3		
Finals	0	0	0	0	0	2	3	0	1	0	0	3	0	9		
Hard Win–loss	0–0	0–0	0–0	1–1	11–12	22–16	26–17	17–16	14–11	17–18	9–11	15–14	5–3	1 / 120	137–119	53%
Clay win–loss	0–2	0–2	0–0	0–0	6–9	15–10	7–6	4–8	9–9	3–4	5–4	12–7	0–2	2 / 63	61–63	50%
Grass win–loss	0–0	0–0	0–0	0–0	4–2	1–3	1–2	3–3	4–1	6–4	3–2	1–2	0–0	0 / 20	23–19	55%
Overall win–loss	0–2	0–2	0–0	1–1	21–23	38–29	34–25	24–27	27–21	26–26	17–17	28–23	5–5	3 / 203	221–201	52%
Win %	0%	0%	–	50%	48%	57%	58%	47%	56%	50%	50%	55%	50%	52.37%		
Year-end ranking	265	233	309	131	48	15	18	57	23	36	62	38	292	$7,125,771		

=== Doubles ===
Tournament	2010	2011	2012	2013	2014	2015	2016	2017	SR	W–L
Grand Slam tournaments
Australian Open	A	2R	1R	A	2R	A	1R	1R	0 / 5	2–5
French Open	2R	2R	2R	A	A	A	A	A	0 / 3	3–3
Wimbledon	1R	A	A	A	A	A	1R	A	0 / 2	0–2
US Open	1R	1R	1R	1R	A	A	1R	A	0 / 5	0–5
Win–loss	1–3	2–3	1–3	0–1	1–1	0–0	0–3	0–1	0 / 15	5–15
ATP World Tour Masters 1000
Indian Wells Masters	A	W	2R	A	A	A	A	A	1 / 2	6–1
Miami Masters	A	A	1R	A	A	A	A	A	0 / 1	0–1
Monte Carlo Masters	A	A	3R	A	A	A	A	A	0 / 1	0–1
Madrid Masters	A	2R	1R	A	A	A	1R	A	0 / 3	1–3
Rome Masters	A	2R	A	A	A	A	A	A	0 / 1	1–1
Canada Masters	A	1R	A	1R	A	A	A	A	0 / 2	0–2
Cincinnati Masters	A	2R	A	A	A	A	A	A	0 / 1	1–1
Shanghai Masters	A	A	1R	A	A	A	A	A	0 / 1	0–1
Paris Masters	A	A	A	A	A	A	A	A	0 / 0	0–0
Win–loss	0–0	8–4	1–5	0–1	0–0	0–0	0–1	0–0	1 / 12	9–11
Career statistics
	2010	2011	2012	2013	2014	2015	2016	2017	Career	
Titles / Finals	0 / 0	1 / 1	0 / 0	0 / 0	0 / 0	0 / 1	0 / 0	0 / 0	1 / 2	
Overall win–loss	1–7	14–16	4–15	0–5	4–5	3–3	1–5	0–1	27–57	
Year-end ranking	319	44	209	–	345	420	–	–	32%	

== ATP career finals ==
=== Singles: 9 (3 titles, 6 runners-up) ===
Legend (singles) Grand Slam tournaments (0–0) ATP World Tour Finals (0–0) ATP World Tour Masters 1000 (0–0) ATP World Tour 500 Series (1–2) ATP World Tour 250 Series (2–4)	Titles by surface Hard (1–3) Clay (2–3) Grass (0–0) Carpet (0–0)

Result	W/L	Date	Tournament	Surface	Opponent	Score
Loss	0–1	Feb 2011	Brasil Open, Brazil	Clay	(Spain) Nicolás Almagro	3–6, 6–7^{(3–7)}
Win	1–1	Jul 2011	Croatia Open, Croatia	Clay	(Croatia) Marin Čilić	6–4, 3–6, 6–3
Loss	1–2	Jan 2012	Brisbane International, Australia	Hard	(United Kingdom) Andy Murray	1–6, 3–6
Win	2–2	Aug 2012	Washington Open, U.S.	Hard	(Germany) Tommy Haas	6–7^{(7–9)}, 6–4, 6–1
Loss	2–3	Oct 2012	Valencia Open, Spain	Hard (i)	(Spain) David Ferrer	1–6, 6–3, 4–6
Loss	2–4	Feb 2014	Rio Open, Brazil	Clay	(Spain) Rafael Nadal	3–6, 6–7^{(3–7)}
Win	3–4	Feb 2017	Argentina Open, Argentina	Clay	(Japan) Kei Nishikori	7–6^{(7–4)}, 6–4
Loss	3–5	Jul 2017	Swedish Open, Sweden	Clay	(Spain) David Ferrer	4–6, 4–6
Loss	3–6	Oct 2017	Shenzhen Open, China	Hard	(Belgium) David Goffin	4–6, 7–6^{(7–5)}, 3–6

=== Doubles: 2 (1 title, 1 runner-up) ===
Legend (singles) Grand Slam tournaments (0–0) ATP World Tour Finals (0–0) ATP World Tour Masters 1000 (1–0) ATP World Tour 500 Series (0–0) ATP World Tour 250 Series (0–1)	Titles by surface Hard (1–1) Clay (0–0) Grass (0–0) Carpet (0–0)

Result	W/L	Tournament	Surface	Partner	Opponents	Score
Win	Mar 2011	Indian Wells Open, United States	Hard	(Belgium) Xavier Malisse	(Switzerland) Roger Federer (Switzerland) Stanislas Wawrinka	6–4, 6–7^{(5–7)}, [10–7]
Loss	Jan 2015	Brisbane International, Australia	Hard	(Japan) Kei Nishikori	(United Kingdom) Jamie Murray (Australia) John Peers	3–6, 6–7^{(4–7)}

== Significant finals ==
=== Masters 1000 finals ===
==== Doubles: 1 (1 title) ====
Result	Date	Tournament	Surface	Partner	Opponents	Score
Win	Mar 2011	Indian Wells Open, United States	Hard	(Belgium) Xavier Malisse	(Switzerland) Roger Federer (Switzerland) Stanislas Wawrinka	6–4, 6–7^{(5–7)}, [10–7]

=== Team finals ===
==== Team events: 1 (1 runner-up) ====
Result	W/L	Date	Tournament	Surface	Partner	Opponents	Score
Loss	0–1	Jan 2016	Hopman Cup, Perth, Western Australia	Hard (i)	(Ukraine) Elina Svitolina	(Australia) Daria Gavrilova (Australia) Nick Kyrgios	0–2

== ATP Challenger & ITF Futures Finals ==
=== Singles: 12 (10–2) ===
Legend (singles) ATP Challenger Tour (5–2) ITF Futures Tour (5–0)	Finals by surface Hard (0–0) Clay (10–2) Grass (0–0)

Result	W–L	Date	Tournament	Tier	Surface	Opponent	Score
Win	1–0	Mar 2006	Egypt F3, Cairo	Futures	Clay	(Czech Republic) Michal Navrátil	7–6^{(7–2)}, 6–4
Win	2–0	May 2006	Ukraine F1, Illyichevsk	Futures	Clay	(Germany) Bastian Knittel	6–3, 6–2
Win	3–0	Jun 2006	Ukraine F3, Cherkassy	Futures	Clay	(Italy) Giancarlo Petrazzuolo	3–6, 7–6^{(9–7)}, 6–2
Win	4–0	Jun 2006	Belarus F1, Minsk	Futures	Clay	(Ukraine) Vladislav Bondarenko	6–2, 7–5
Win	5–0	Jul 2006	Italy F24, Modena	Futures	Clay	(Russia) Andrey Golubev	4–6, 7–6^{(10–8)}, 7–6^{(11–9)}
Win	6–0	Jun 2006	Sassuolo, Italy	Challenger	Clay	(Spain) Héctor Ruiz-Cadenas	6–1, 6–4
Win	7–0	Aug 2009	Orbetello, Italy	Challenger	Clay	(Spain) Pablo Andújar	6–4, 6–2
Win	8–0	Sep 2009	Como, Italy	Challenger	Clay	(Argentina) Juan-Martín Aranguren	7–5, 7–6^{(7–5)}
Win	9–0	Sep 2009	Trnava, Slovakia	Challenger	Clay	(Algeria) Lamine Ouahab	6–2, 6–2
Loss	9–1	Feb 2010	Tanger, Morocco	Challenger	Clay	(France) Stéphane Robert	6–7^{(5–7)}, 4–6
Win	10–1	Feb 2010	Meknes, Morocco	Challenger	Clay	(Portugal) Rui Machado	7–5, 6–2
Loss	10–2	Mar 2010	Marrakech, Morocco	Challenger	Clay	(Finland) Jarkko Nieminen	3–6, 2–6

== Wins over top 10 players ==
- He has a 10–47 record against players who were, at the time the match was played, ranked in the top 10.

Season	2006–2010	2011	2012	2013	2014	2015	2016	2017	2018	2019	2020	Total
Wins	0	2	1	0	3	2	1	1	0	0	0	10

#	Player	Rank	Event	Surface	Rd	Score
2011
1.	(Sweden) Robin Söderling	4	Australian Open, Melbourne, Australia	Hard	4R	1–6, 6–3, 6–1, 4–6, 6–2
2.	(Spain) David Ferrer	7	Nice, France	Clay	QF	6–4, 1–6, 7–5
2012
3.	(France) Jo-Wilfried Tsonga	5	Madrid, Spain	Clay	3R	7–5, 3–6, 7–6^{(7–2)}
2014
4.	(Spain) David Ferrer	4	Rio de Janeiro, Brazil	Clay	SF	6–4, 6–4
5.	(Spain) Rafael Nadal	1	Indian Wells, United States	Hard	3R	6–3, 3–6, 7–6^{(7–5)}
6.	(Switzerland) Stan Wawrinka	3	Miami, United States	Hard	4R	6–4, 3–6, 6–1
2015
7.	(Spain) Rafael Nadal	10	Queen's Club, England	Grass	1R	6–3, 6–7^{(6–8)}, 6–4
8.	(Czech Republic) Tomáš Berdych	6	Cincinnati, United States	Hard	QF	6–4, 6–2
2016
9.	(Spain) David Ferrer	8	Acapulco, Mexico	Hard	2R	6–4, 6–4
2017
10.	(Japan) Kei Nishikori	5	Buenos Aires, Argentina	Clay	F	7–6^{(7–4)}, 6–4
