= 2012 BNP Paribas Masters =

- Date: 29 October – 4 November 2012
- Edition: 40th
- Category: ATP World Tour Masters 1000
- Draw: 48S / 32D
- Prize money: €2,427,975
- Surface: Hard / indoor
- Location: Paris, France
- Venue: Palais Omnisports de Paris-Bercy

Champions

Singles
- (Spain) David Ferrer

Doubles
- (India) Mahesh Bhupathi / (India) Rohan Bopanna
← 2011 ·	Paris Masters	· 2013 →

The 2012 BNP Paribas Masters was a professional men's tennis tournament that was played on indoor hard courts. It was the 40th edition of the tournament which was part of the 2012 ATP World Tour. It took place in Paris between 29 October and 4 November 2012. Fourth-seeded David Ferrer won the singles title.

== Singles main-draw entrants ==
=== Seeds ===
Country	Player	Rank^{1}	Seed
~~SUI~~	~~Roger Federer~~	~~1~~	~~1~~
SRB	Novak Djokovic	2	2
GBR	Andy Murray	3	3
ESP	David Ferrer	5	4
CZE	Tomáš Berdych	6	5
FRA	Jo-Wilfried Tsonga	7	6
ARG	Juan Martín del Potro	8	7
SRB	Janko Tipsarević	9	8
ARG	Juan Mónaco	10	9
USA	John Isner	11	10
ESP	Nicolás Almagro	12	11
FRA	Richard Gasquet	13	12
CRO	Marin Čilić	14	13
CAN	Milos Raonic	15	14
JPN	Kei Nishikori	16	15
SUI	Stanislas Wawrinka	17	16

- Rankings are as of 22 October 2012

=== Other entrants ===
The following players received wildcards into the singles main draw:

- (France) Michaël Llodra
- (France) Paul-Henri Mathieu
- (France) Benoît Paire

The following players received entry from the qualifying draw:

- (Spain) Roberto Bautista Agut
- (Bulgaria) Grigor Dimitrov
- (Colombia) Alejandro Falla
- (Spain) Guillermo García López
- (Poland) Jerzy Janowicz
- (Netherlands) Igor Sijsling

The following players received entry as lucky loser:

- (Romania) Victor Hănescu
- (Spain) Daniel Gimeno Traver

=== Withdrawals ===
- (Switzerland) Roger Federer (fatigue) → replaced by (Romania) Victor Hănescu
- (United States) Mardy Fish (health issues) → replaced by (Slovakia) Martin Kližan
- (Germany) Tommy Haas → replaced by (Spain) Albert Ramos Viñolas
- (Spain) Rafael Nadal (left knee injury) → replaced by (Brazil) Thomaz Bellucci
- (United States) Andy Roddick (retired from tennis) → replaced by (Spain) Daniel Gimeno Traver

=== Retirements ===
- (Japan) Kei Nishikori (right ankle injury)
- (Serbia) Janko Tipsarević (illness)
- (Spain) Fernando Verdasco (neck injury)

== Doubles main-draw entrants ==
=== Seeds ===
Country	Player	Country	Player	Rank^{1}	Seed
USA	Bob Bryan	USA	Mike Bryan	2	1
BLR	Max Mirnyi	CAN	Daniel Nestor	6	2
SWE	Robert Lindstedt	ROU	Horia Tecău	15	3
POL	Mariusz Fyrstenberg	POL	Marcin Matkowski	26	4
IND	Mahesh Bhupathi	IND	Rohan Bopanna	27	5
AUT	Jürgen Melzer	IND	Leander Paes	28	6
PAK	Aisam-ul-Haq Qureshi	NED	Jean-Julien Rojer	28	7
AUT	Alexander Peya	BRA	Bruno Soares	46	8

- Rankings are as of 22 October 2012

=== Other entrants ===
The following pairs received wildcards into the doubles main draw:

- (France) Julien Benneteau / (France) Adrian Mannarino
- (France) Josselin Ouanna / (France) Nicolas Renavand

The following pair received entry as alternates:

- (Argentina) Carlos Berlocq / (Uzbekistan) Denis Istomin

=== Withdrawals ===
- (Spain) Fernando Verdasco (neck injury)

=== Retirements ===
- (Sweden) Robert Lindstedt (neck injury)

== Finals ==
=== Singles ===
- (Spain) David Ferrer defeated (Poland) Jerzy Janowicz, 6–4, 6–3
- It was Ferrer's first Masters 1000 title. It was also his seventh title of the year, and eighteenth of his career.

=== Doubles ===
- (India) Mahesh Bhupathi / (India) Rohan Bopanna defeated (Pakistan) Aisam-ul-Haq Qureshi / (Netherlands) Jean-Julien Rojer, 7–6^{(8–6)}, 6–3
