= 2013 BNP Paribas Masters =

- Date: 28 October – 3 November
- Edition: 41st
- Category: ATP World Tour Masters 1000
- Draw: 48S / 24D
- Prize money: €2 646 495
- Surface: Hard / indoor
- Location: Paris, France
- Venue: Palais omnisports de Paris-Bercy

Champions

Singles
- (Serbia) Novak Djokovic

Doubles
- (United States) Bob Bryan / (United States) Mike Bryan
← 2012 ·	Paris Masters	· 2014 →

The 2013 BNP Paribas Masters was a professional men's tennis tournament that was played on indoor hard courts. It was the 41st edition of the tournament, which is part of the 2013 ATP World Tour. It took place at the Palais omnisports de Paris-Bercy in Paris, France, between 28 October and 3 November 2013. Second-seeded Novak Djokovic won the singles title.

== Points and prize money ==
=== Point distribution ===
Event	W	F	SF	QF	Round of 16	Round of 32	Round of 64	Q	Q2	Q1
Singles	1000	600	360	180	90	45	10	25	16	0
Doubles	1000	600	360	180	90	0	—	—	—	—

=== Prize money ===
Event	W	F	SF	QF	Round of 16	Round of 32	Round of 64	Q2	Q1
Singles	€522,100	€256,000	€128,850	€65,520	€34,020	€17,940	€9,685	€2,150	€1,090
Doubles	€155,400	€76,060	€38,150	€19,580	€10,120	€5,340	—	—	—

== Singles main-draw entrants ==
=== Singles seeds ===
The following are the seeded players. Ranking and seeding are according to ATP rankings on 21 October 2013. Accumulated points are according to ATP website on 28 October 2013.

Seed	Rank	Player	Points before	Points defending	Points won	Status
1	1	(Spain) Rafael Nadal	11,670	0	360	Semifinals lost to (Spain) David Ferrer
2	2	(Serbia) Novak Djokovic	11,120	10	1000	Champion, defeated (Spain) David Ferrer
3	3	(Spain) David Ferrer	6,600	1,000	600	Runner-up, Final lost to (Serbia) Novak Djokovic
4	5	(Argentina) Juan Martín del Potro	5,365	90	180	Quarterfinals lost to (Switzerland) Roger Federer
5	6	(Switzerland) Roger Federer	4,245	0	360	Semifinals lost to (Serbia) Novak Djokovic
6	7	(Czech Republic) Tomáš Berdych	4,180	180	180	Quarterfinals lost to (Spain) David Ferrer
7	8	(Switzerland) Stanislas Wawrinka	3,240	90	180	Quarterfinals lost to (Serbia) Novak Djokovic
8	9	(France) Jo-Wilfried Tsonga	3,235	180	10	Second round lost to (Japan) Kei Nishikori
9	10	(France) Richard Gasquet	3,130	10	180	Quarterfinals lost to (Spain) Rafael Nadal
10	11	(Canada) Milos Raonic	2,860	90	90	Third round lost to (Czech Republic) Tomáš Berdych
11	12	(Germany) Tommy Haas	2,425	0	10	Second round lost to (Germany) Philipp Kohlschreiber
12	13	(Spain) Nicolás Almagro	2,290	90	90	Third round lost to (Switzerland) Stanislas Wawrinka
13	14	(United States) John Isner	2,070	10	90	Third round lost to (Serbia) Novak Djokovic
14	15	(Poland) Jerzy Janowicz	2,150	625	90	Third round lost to (Spain) Rafael Nadal
15	16	(France) Gilles Simon	2,060	360	90	Third round lost to (Spain) David Ferrer
16	17	(Italy) Fabio Fognini	2,010	0	10	Second round lost to (Bulgaria) Grigor Dimitrov

==== Withdrawn players ====
Rank	Player	Points	Points defending	Points won	Withdrew due to
4	(United Kingdom) Andy Murray	6,280	90	0	Back surgery

=== Other entrants ===
The following players received wildcards into the singles main draw:

- (France) Michaël Llodra
- (France) Nicolas Mahut
- (France) Adrian Mannarino

The following player received entry as a special exempt:

- (France) Édouard Roger-Vasselin

The following players received entry from the qualifying draw:

- (Colombia) Santiago Giraldo
- (Netherlands) Robin Haase
- (France) Pierre-Hugues Herbert
- (Poland) Michał Przysiężny
- (Netherlands) Igor Sijsling
- (Australia) Bernard Tomic

The following player received entry as a lucky loser:

- (Spain) Pablo Andújar

=== Withdrawals ===
Before the tournament

- (Austria) Jürgen Melzer
- (Argentina) Juan Mónaco
- (France) Gaël Monfils
- (United States) Sam Querrey
- (Spain) Tommy Robredo
- (Serbia) Janko Tipsarević
- (Sweden) Robin Söderling

== Doubles main-draw entrants ==
=== Seeds ===
Country	Player	Country	Player	Rank^{1}	Seed
USA	Bob Bryan	USA	Mike Bryan	2	1
AUT	Alexander Peya	BRA	Bruno Soares	7	2
ESP	Marcel Granollers	ESP	Marc López	13	3
CRO	Ivan Dodig	BRA	Marcelo Melo	20	4
IND	Rohan Bopanna	FRA	Édouard Roger-Vasselin	27	5
ESP	David Marrero	ESP	Fernando Verdasco	28	6
CAN	Daniel Nestor	IND	Leander Paes	28	7
PAK	Aisam-ul-Haq Qureshi	NED	Jean-Julien Rojer	30	8

- Rankings are as of 21 October 2013

=== Other entrants ===
The following pairs received wildcards into the doubles main draw:

- (France) Kenny de Schepper / (France) Pierre-Hugues Herbert
- (France) Adrian Mannarino / (France) Gaël Monfils

== Finals ==
=== Singles ===
- (Serbia) Novak Djokovic defeated (Spain) David Ferrer 7–5, 7–5

=== Doubles ===
- (United States) Bob Bryan / (United States) Mike Bryan defeated (Austria) Alexander Peya / (Brazil) Bruno Soares 6–3, 6–3
