= 2013 BNP Paribas Masters – Doubles =

Doubles
- 2013 BNP Paribas Masters

Final
- Champions: (United States) Bob Bryan (United States) Mike Bryan
- Runners-up: (Austria) Alexander Peya (Brazil) Bruno Soares
- Score: 6–3, 6–3

Details
- Draw: 24
- Seeds: 8

Events
Singles	Doubles
← 2012 ·	BNP Paribas Masters	· 2014 →

Mahesh Bhupathi and Rohan Bopanna were the defending champions, but Bhupathi decided not to participate. Bopanna played alongside Édouard Roger-Vasselin.

Bob Bryan and Mike Bryan won the title for a third time, defeating Alexander Peya and Bruno Soares in the final, 6–3, 6–3.

== Seeds ==
1. (United States) Bob Bryan / (United States) Mike Bryan (champions)
2. (Austria) Alexander Peya / (Brazil) Bruno Soares (final)
3. (Spain) Marcel Granollers / (Spain) Marc López (quarterfinals)
4. (Croatia) Ivan Dodig / (Brazil) Marcelo Melo (semifinals)
5. (India) Rohan Bopanna / (France) Édouard Roger-Vasselin (quarterfinals)
6. (Spain) David Marrero / (Spain) Fernando Verdasco (second round)
7. (Canada) Daniel Nestor / (India) Leander Paes (second round)
8. (Pakistan) Aisam-ul-Haq Qureshi / (Netherlands) Jean-Julien Rojer (quarterfinals)

== Draw ==
Key

- Q = Qualifier
- WC = Wild card
- LL = Lucky loser
- Alt = Alternate
- ITF = ITF entry
- PR = Protected ranking
- SR = Special ranking
- SE = Special exempt
- JE = Junior exempt
- JR = Junior Accelerator Programme entrant
- CO = College Accelerator Programme entrant
- NG = Next Gen Accelerator Program entrant
- w/o = Walkover
- r = Retired
- d = Defaulted

=== Finals ===
Semifinals
1	(United States) Bob Bryan (United States) Mike Bryan	6	7
4	(Croatia) Ivan Dodig (Brazil) Marcelo Melo	4	5
(Belarus) Max Mirnyi (Romania) Horia Tecău	6	2	[3]
2	(Austria) Alexander Peya (Brazil) Bruno Soares	3	6	[10]

Final
1	(United States) Bob Bryan (United States) Mike Bryan	6	6
2	(Austria) Alexander Peya (Brazil) Bruno Soares	3	3

=== Top half ===
First round
WC	(France) K de Schepper (France) P-H Herbert	4	6^{6}
(Poland) M Fyrstenberg (Poland) M Matkowski	6	7^{8}
(Czech Republic) L Dlouhý (Latvia) E Gulbis	6	5	[7]
(France) J Benneteau (Serbia) N Zimonjić	4	7	[10]
(France) J Chardy (France) G Simon	6^{4}	6	[10]
WC	(France) A Mannarino (France) G Monfils	7^{7}	3	[7]
(United States) J Isner (United States) N Monroe	3	6	[10]
(United Kingdom) J Marray (Netherlands) I Sijsling	6	3	[4]

Second round
1	(United States) B Bryan (United States) M Bryan	6	5	[10]
(Poland) M Fyrstenberg (Poland) M Matkowski	3	7	[8]
(France) J Benneteau (Serbia) N Zimonjić	4	4
8	(Pakistan) A-u-H Qureshi (Netherlands) J-J Rojer	6	6
4	(Croatia) I Dodig (Brazil) M Melo	6	6
(France) J Chardy (France) G Simon	3	2
(United States) J Isner (United States) N Monroe	6^{2}	5
5	(India) R Bopanna (France) É Roger-Vasselin	7^{7}	7

Quarterfinals
1	(United States) B Bryan (United States) M Bryan	3	6	[10]
8	(Pakistan) A-u-H Qureshi (Netherlands) J-J Rojer	6	3	[5]
4	(Croatia) I Dodig (Brazil) M Melo	7^{7}	3	[10]
5	(India) R Bopanna (France) É Roger-Vasselin	6^{5}	6	[4]

Semifinals
1	(United States) B Bryan (United States) M Bryan	6	7
4	(Croatia) I Dodig (Brazil) M Melo	4	5

=== Bottom half ===
First round
(Belarus) M Mirnyi (Romania) H Tecău	7^{7}	7^{7}
(Poland) Ł Kubot (Sweden) R Lindstedt	6^{3}	6^{5}
(France) M Llodra (France) N Mahut	4	1
(United States) E Butorac (South Africa) R Klaasen	6	6
(Mexico) S González (United States) S Lipsky	6	7
(United Kingdom) J Murray (Australia) J Peers	4	5
(Philippines) T Huey (United Kingdom) D Inglot	6^{5}	3
(Italy) F Fognini (Italy) A Seppi	7^{7}	6

Second round
6	(Spain) D Marrero (Spain) F Verdasco	7^{7}	5	[8]
(Belarus) M Mirnyi (Romania) H Tecău	6^{3}	7	[10]
(United States) E Butorac (South Africa) R Klaasen	3	6	[5]
3	(Spain) M Granollers (Spain) M López	6	1	[10]
7	(Canada) D Nestor (India) L Paes	4	3
(Mexico) S González (United States) S Lipsky	6	6
(Italy) F Fognini (Italy) A Seppi	6^{4}	7^{7}	[8]
2	(Austria) A Peya (Brazil) B Soares	7^{7}	6^{1}	[10]

Quarterfinals
(Belarus) M Mirnyi (Romania) H Tecău	6	6
3	(Spain) M Granollers (Spain) M López	3	4
(Mexico) S González (United States) S Lipsky	6	3	[5]
2	(Austria) A Peya (Brazil) B Soares	3	6	[10]

Semifinals
(Belarus) M Mirnyi (Romania) H Tecău	6	2	[3]
2	(Austria) A Peya (Brazil) B Soares	3	6	[10]
