= 2015 BNP Paribas Masters – Doubles =

Doubles
- 2015 BNP Paribas Masters

Final
- Champions: (Croatia) Ivan Dodig (Brazil) Marcelo Melo
- Runners-up: (Canada) Vasek Pospisil (United States) Jack Sock
- Score: 2–6, 6–3, [10–5]

Details
- Draw: 24
- Seeds: 8

Events
Singles	Doubles
← 2014 ·	BNP Paribas Masters	· 2016 →

Bob Bryan and Mike Bryan were the two-time defending champions, but lost in the quarterfinals to Vasek Pospisil and Jack Sock.
Ivan Dodig and Marcelo Melo won the title, defeating Pospsil and Sock in the final, 2–6, 6–3, [10–5].

== Seeds ==
All seeds received a bye into the second round.

1. (United States) Bob Bryan / (United States) Mike Bryan (quarterfinals)
2. (Croatia) Ivan Dodig / (Brazil) Marcelo Melo (champions)
3. (Netherlands) Jean-Julien Rojer / (Romania) Horia Tecău (quarterfinals)
4. (United Kingdom) Jamie Murray / (Australia) John Peers (second round)
5. (France) Pierre-Hugues Herbert / (France) Nicolas Mahut (second round)
6. (Italy) Simone Bolelli / (Italy) Fabio Fognini (withdrew)
7. (Poland) Marcin Matkowski / (Serbia) Nenad Zimonjić (second round)
8. (India) Rohan Bopanna / (Romania) Florin Mergea (quarterfinals)

== Draw ==
=== Key ===
- Q = Qualifier
- WC = Wild card
- LL = Lucky loser
- Alt = Alternate
- SE = Special exempt
- PR = Protected ranking
- ITF = ITF entry
- JE = Junior exempt
- w/o = Walkover
- r = Retired
- d = Defaulted
- SR = Special ranking

=== Finals ===
Semifinals
(Canada) Vasek Pospisil (United States) Jack Sock	7^{8}	6
(United Kingdom) Dominic Inglot (Sweden) Robert Lindstedt	6^{6}	1
PR	(Czech Republic) Tomáš Berdych (Czech Republic) Radek Štěpánek	6	3	[5]
2	(Croatia) Ivan Dodig (Brazil) Marcelo Melo	4	6	[10]

Final
(Canada) Vasek Pospisil (United States) Jack Sock	6	3	[5]
2	(Croatia) Ivan Dodig (Brazil) Marcelo Melo	2	6	[10]

=== Top half ===
First round
(Brazil) T Bellucci (Serbia) V Troicki	5	6^{3}
(Pakistan) A-u-H Qureshi (France) G Simon	7	7^{7}
(Canada) V Pospisil (United States) J Sock	6	5	[10]
WC	(France) P-H Mathieu (France) B Paire	3	7	[5]
(United States) E Butorac (United States) J Isner	6	6^{6}	[4]
(South Africa) R Klaasen (United States) R Ram	4	7^{8}	[10]
(Spain) R Nadal (India) L Paes	3	4
(United Kingdom) D Inglot (Sweden) R Lindstedt	6	6

Second round
1	(United States) B Bryan (United States) M Bryan	6	2	[10]
(Pakistan) A-u-H Qureshi (France) G Simon	1	6	[7]
(Canada) V Pospisil (United States) J Sock	7^{11}	7^{7}
7	(Poland) M Matkowski (Serbia) N Zimonjić	6^{9}	6^{2}
4	(United Kingdom) J Murray (Australia) J Peers	6^{3}	5
(South Africa) R Klaasen (United States) R Ram	7^{7}	7
(United Kingdom) D Inglot (Sweden) R Lindstedt	6	6
Alt	(Uruguay) P Cuevas (Spain) M Granollers	3	2

Quarterfinals
1	(United States) B Bryan (United States) M Bryan	6^{3}	3
(Canada) V Pospisil (United States) J Sock	7^{7}	6
(South Africa) R Klaasen (United States) R Ram	6^{4}	3
(United Kingdom) D Inglot (Sweden) R Lindstedt	7^{7}	6

Semifinals
(Canada) V Pospisil (United States) J Sock	7^{8}	6
(United Kingdom) D Inglot (Sweden) R Lindstedt	6^{6}	1

=== Bottom half ===
First round
WC	(France) F Martin (France) L Pouille	6	0	[4]
PR	(Czech Republic) T Berdych (Czech Republic) R Štěpánek	3	6	[10]
(Spain) G García López (Spain) D Marrero	4	2
(Canada) D Nestor (France) É Roger-Vasselin	6	6
(Colombia) JS Cabal (Colombia) R Farah	5	7^{7}	[13]
(Spain) F López (Belarus) M Mirnyi	7	6^{4}	[11]
(United Kingdom) C Fleming (United Kingdom) A Murray	2	2
(Austria) A Peya (Brazil) B Soares	6	6

Second round
5	(France) P-H Herbert (France) N Mahut	6^{9}	4
PR	(Czech Republic) T Berdych (Czech Republic) R Štěpánek	7^{11}	6
(Canada) D Nestor (France) É Roger-Vasselin	4	2
3	(Netherlands) J-J Rojer (Romania) H Tecău	6	6
8	(India) R Bopanna (Romania) F Mergea	6^{3}	6	[10]
(Colombia) JS Cabal (Colombia) R Farah	7^{7}	4	[5]
(Austria) A Peya (Brazil) B Soares	4	6	[6]
2	(Croatia) I Dodig (Brazil) M Melo	6	3	[10]

Quarterfinals
PR	(Czech Republic) T Berdych (Czech Republic) R Štěpánek	7^{7}	6
3	(Netherlands) J-J Rojer (Romania) H Tecău	6^{5}	3
8	(India) R Bopanna (Romania) F Mergea	5	7^{7}	[10]
2	(Croatia) I Dodig (Brazil) M Melo	7	6^{4}	[12]

Semifinals
PR	(Czech Republic) T Berdych (Czech Republic) R Štěpánek	6	3	[5]
2	(Croatia) I Dodig (Brazil) M Melo	4	6	[10]
