= 2013 BNP Paribas Masters – Singles =

Singles
- 2013 BNP Paribas Masters

Final
- Champion: (Serbia) Novak Djokovic
- Runner-up: (Spain) David Ferrer
- Score: 7–5, 7–5

Details
- Draw: 48 (6 Q / 3 WC)
- Seeds: 16

Events
Singles	Doubles
← 2012 ·	BNP Paribas Masters	· 2014 →

Novak Djokovic defeated the defending champion David Ferrer in the final, 7–5, 7–5 to win the singles title at the 2013 Paris Masters. It was his second Paris Masters title. This also marked Ferrer's seventh consecutive defeat in an ATP World Tour final.

== Seeds ==
All seeds receive a bye into the second round.

1. (Spain) Rafael Nadal (semifinals)
2. (Serbia) Novak Djokovic (champion)
3. (Spain) David Ferrer (final)
4. (Argentina) Juan Martín del Potro (quarterfinals)
5. (Switzerland) Roger Federer (semifinals)
6. (Czech Republic) Tomáš Berdych (quarterfinals)
7. (Switzerland) Stan Wawrinka (quarterfinals)
8. (France) Jo-Wilfried Tsonga (second round)
9. (France) Richard Gasquet (quarterfinals)
10. (Canada) Milos Raonic (third round)
11. (Germany) Tommy Haas (second round)
12. (Spain) Nicolás Almagro (third round)
13. (United States) John Isner (third round)
14. (Poland) Jerzy Janowicz (third round)
15. (France) Gilles Simon (third round)
16. (Italy) Fabio Fognini (second round)

== Draw ==
=== Key ===
- Q = Qualifier
- WC = Wild card
- LL = Lucky loser
- Alt = Alternate
- SE = Special exempt
- PR = Protected ranking
- ITF = ITF entry
- JE = Junior exempt
- w/o = Walkover
- r = Retired
- d = Defaulted
- SR = Special ranking

=== Finals ===
Quarterfinals
1	(Spain) Rafael Nadal	6	6
9	(France) Richard Gasquet	4	1
3	(Spain) David Ferrer	4	7	6
6	(Czech Republic) Tomáš Berdych	6	5	3
5	(Switzerland) Roger Federer	6	4	6
4	(Argentina) Juan Martín del Potro	3	6	3
7	(Switzerland) Stan Wawrinka	1	4
2	(Serbia) Novak Djokovic	6	6

Semifinals
1	(Spain) Rafael Nadal	3	5
3	(Spain) David Ferrer	6	7
5	(Switzerland) Roger Federer	6	3	2
2	(Serbia) Novak Djokovic	4	6	6

Final
3	(Spain) David Ferrer	5	5
2	(Serbia) Novak Djokovic	7	7

=== Top half ===
==== Section 1 ====
First round
(Russia) D Tursunov	4	4
(Spain) M Granollers	6	6
WC	(France) A Mannarino	3	6	4
Q	(Colombia) S Giraldo	6	2	6
(Latvia) E Gulbis	6^{3}	6^{5}
(Spain) F Verdasco	7^{7}	7^{7}
(Japan) K Nishikori	6	6
(France) J Benneteau	4	2

Second round
1	(Spain) R Nadal	7	7
(Spain) M Granollers	5	5
Q	(Colombia) S Giraldo	6^{3}	3
14	(Poland) J Janowicz	7^{7}	6
9	(France) R Gasquet	7	6^{6}	6
(Spain) F Verdasco	5	7^{8}	3
(Japan) K Nishikori	1	7^{7}	7^{9}
8	(France) J-W Tsonga	6	6^{4}	6^{7}

Third round
1	(Spain) R Nadal	7	6
14	(Poland) J Janowicz	5	4
9	(France) R Gasquet	6	6
(Japan) K Nishikori	3	2

Quarterfinals
1	(Spain) R Nadal	6	6
9	(France) R Gasquet	4	1

==== Section 2 ====
First round
(Czech Republic) L Rosol	6	6
(France) J Chardy	3	4
WC	(France) N Mahut	7^{8}	6
(Ukraine) A Dolgopolov	6^{6}	1
(Uzbekistan) D Istomin	6^{8}	3
Q	(Netherlands) R Haase	7^{10}	6
LL	(Spain) P Andújar	6	2	6
(Canada) V Pospisil	4	6	4

Second round
3	(Spain) D Ferrer	6	2	6
(Czech Republic) L Rosol	0	6	3
WC	(France) N Mahut	4	7^{7}	6^{3}
15	(France) G Simon	6	6^{5}	7^{7}
10	(Canada) M Raonic	6	6
Q	(Netherlands) R Haase	3	4
LL	(Spain) P Andújar	2	5
6	(Czech Republic) T Berdych	6	7

Third round
3	(Spain) D Ferrer	6	6
15	(France) G Simon	2	3
10	(Canada) M Raonic	6^{13}	4
6	(Czech Republic) T Berdych	7^{15}	6

Quarterfinals
3	(Spain) D Ferrer	4	7	6
6	(Czech Republic) T Berdych	6	5	3

=== Bottom half ===
==== Section 3 ====
First round
(South Africa) K Anderson	4	7^{7}	2
(Russia) M Youzhny	6	6^{0}	1^{r}
(Italy) A Seppi	3	6	4
(Germany) P Kohlschreiber	6	3	6
WC	(France) M Llodra	7^{7}	3	3
(Bulgaria) G Dimitrov	6^{5}	6	6
Q	(Netherlands) I Sijsling	7	1	4
(Croatia) M Čilić	5	6	6

Second round
5	(Switzerland) R Federer	6	6
(South Africa) K Anderson	4	4
(Germany) P Kohlschreiber	6	6
11	(Germany) T Haas	2	2
16	(Italy) F Fognini	3	7	2
(Bulgaria) G Dimitrov	6	5	6
(Croatia) M Čilić	4	6^{3}
4	(Argentina) JM del Potro	6	7^{7}

Third round
5	(Switzerland) R Federer	6	6
(Germany) P Kohlschreiber	3	4
(Bulgaria) G Dimitrov	6	3	4
4	(Argentina) JM del Potro	3	6	6

Quarterfinals
5	(Switzerland) R Federer	6	4	6
4	(Argentina) JM del Potro	3	6	3

==== Section 4 ====
First round
(Spain) F López	6	6^{4}	7^{7}
Q	(Australia) B Tomic	4	7^{7}	6^{1}
SE	(France) É Roger-Vasselin	6^{6}	4
(Croatia) I Dodig	7^{8}	6
Q	(Poland) M Przysiężny	6	7^{8}
(Finland) J Nieminen	3	6^{6}
Q	(France) P-H Herbert	6	6
(France) B Paire	2	2

Second round
7	(Switzerland) S Wawrinka	6	3	6
(Spain) F López	3	6	3
(Croatia) I Dodig	4	3
12	(Spain) N Almagro	6	6
13	(United States) J Isner	7^{7}	4	6
Q	(Poland) M Przysiężny	6^{3}	6	3
Q	(France) P-H Herbert	6^{3}	3
2	(Serbia) N Djokovic	7^{7}	6

Third round
7	(Switzerland) S Wawrinka	6	6
12	(Spain) N Almagro	3	2
13	(United States) J Isner	7^{7}	1	2
2	(Serbia) N Djokovic	6^{5}	6	6

Quarterfinals
7	(Switzerland) S Wawrinka	1	4
2	(Serbia) N Djokovic	6	6

== Qualifying ==
=== Seeds ===
1. (Netherlands) Robin Haase (qualified)
2. (Spain) Pablo Andújar (qualifying competition, retired, lucky loser)
3. (Argentina) Horacio Zeballos (first round)
4. (Australia) Bernard Tomic (qualified)
5. (Portugal) João Sousa (first round)
6. (Spain) Roberto Bautista Agut (qualifying competition)
7. (Spain) Guillermo García López (first round)
8. (Spain) Pablo Carreño (qualifying competition)
9. (Netherlands) Igor Sijsling (qualified)
10. (Poland) Łukasz Kubot (qualifying competition)
11. (Spain) Daniel Gimeno Traver (first round)
12. (Poland) Michał Przysiężny (qualified)

=== Qualifiers ===
1. (Netherlands) Robin Haase
2. (Colombia) Santiago Giraldo
3. (France) Pierre-Hugues Herbert
4. (Australia) Bernard Tomic
5. (Poland) Michał Przysiężny
6. (Netherlands) Igor Sijsling

=== Lucky losers ===
1. (Spain) Pablo Andújar

=== Qualifying draw ===
==== First qualifier ====
First round
1	(Netherlands) Robin Haase	6	3	7^{12}
(Spain) Albert Ramos	1	6	6^{10}
(United States) Denis Kudla	7^{7}	2	3
10	(Poland) Łukasz Kubot	6^{0}	6	6

Qualifying competition
1	(Netherlands) Robin Haase	6	7^{7}
10	(Poland) Łukasz Kubot	2	6^{5}

==== Second qualifier ====
First round
2	(Spain) Pablo Andújar	6	6
(Slovakia) Lukáš Lacko	2	2
(Colombia) Santiago Giraldo	6	6
11	(Spain) Daniel Gimeno Traver	3	2

Qualifying competition
2	(Spain) Pablo Andújar	2	0^{r}
(Colombia) Santiago Giraldo	6	0

==== Third qualifier ====
First round
3	(Argentina) Horacio Zeballos	6	6^{6}	4
WC	(France) Pierre-Hugues Herbert	3	7^{8}	6
(France) Kenny de Schepper	7^{11}	6
7	(Spain) Guillermo García López	6^{9}	4

Qualifying competition
WC	(France) Pierre-Hugues Herbert	6	7^{7}
(France) Kenny de Schepper	4	6^{4}

==== Fourth qualifier ====
First round
4	(Australia) Bernard Tomic	7^{8}	7^{7}
(Croatia) Ivo Karlović	6^{6}	6^{3}
WC	(France) Constant Lestienne	1	6	2
8	(Spain) Pablo Carreño	6	4	6

Qualifying competition
4	(Australia) Bernard Tomic	6^{4}	6	6
8	(Spain) Pablo Carreño	7^{7}	4	0

==== Fifth qualifier ====
First round
5	(Portugal) João Sousa	6^{2}	4
(Romania) Victor Hănescu	7^{7}	6
WC	(France) Marc Gicquel	1	4
12	(Poland) Michał Przysiężny	6	6

Qualifying competition
(Romania) Victor Hănescu	3	7^{7}	3
12	(Poland) Michał Przysiężny	6	6^{3}	6

==== Sixth qualifier ====
First round
6	(Spain) Roberto Bautista Agut	6	7^{7}
Alt	(Colombia) Alejandro Falla	3	6^{4}
WC	(France) Maxime Teixeira	3	2
9	(Netherlands) Igor Sijsling	6	6

Qualifying competition
6	(Spain) Roberto Bautista Agut	7^{7}	1	4
9	(Netherlands) Igor Sijsling	6^{5}	6	6
