= 2014 BNP Paribas Masters – Doubles =

Doubles
- 2014 BNP Paribas Masters

Final
- Champions: (United States) Bob Bryan (United States) Mike Bryan
- Runners-up: (Poland) Marcin Matkowski (Austria) Jürgen Melzer
- Score: 7–6^{(7–5)}, 5–7, [10–6]

Details
- Draw: 24
- Seeds: 8

Events
Singles	Doubles
← 2013 ·	BNP Paribas Masters	· 2015 →

Bob Bryan and Mike Bryan successfully defended their title, defeating Marcin Matkowski and Jürgen Melzer in the final, 7–6^{(7–5)}, 5–7, [10–6].

== Seeds ==
All seeds receive a bye into the second round.

1. (United States) Bob Bryan / (United States) Mike Bryan (champions)
2. (Austria) Alexander Peya / (Brazil) Bruno Soares (second round)
3. (France) Julien Benneteau / (France) Édouard Roger-Vasselin (second round)
4. (Croatia) Ivan Dodig / (Brazil) Marcelo Melo (second round, retired because of Dodig's back injury)
5. (Spain) Marcel Granollers / (Spain) Marc López (semifinals)
6. (Canada) Vasek Pospisil / (United States) Jack Sock (second round)
7. (India) Rohan Bopanna / (Canada) Daniel Nestor (quarterfinals)
8. (Netherlands) Jean-Julien Rojer / (Romania) Horia Tecău (semifinals)

== Draw ==
=== Key ===
- Q = Qualifier
- WC = Wild card
- LL = Lucky loser
- Alt = Alternate
- SE = Special exempt
- PR = Protected ranking
- ITF = ITF entry
- JE = Junior exempt
- w/o = Walkover
- r = Retired
- d = Defaulted
- SR = Special ranking

=== Finals ===
Semifinals
1	(United States) Bob Bryan (United States) Mike Bryan	6	6
8	(Netherlands) Jean-Julien Rojer (Romania) Horia Tecău	3	3
PR	(Poland) Marcin Matkowski (Austria) Jürgen Melzer	6	6
5	(Spain) Marcel Granollers (Spain) Marc López	2	3

Final
1	(United States) Bob Bryan (United States) Mike Bryan	7^{7}	5	[10]
PR	(Poland) Marcin Matkowski (Austria) Jürgen Melzer	6^{5}	7	[6]

=== Top half ===
First round
(South Africa) K Anderson (Serbia) N Zimonjić	6	3	[12]
(United Kingdom) D Inglot (Romania) F Mergea	3	6	[10]
(India) L Paes (Switzerland) S Wawrinka	6	2	[10]
(Spain) F López (Belarus) M Mirnyi	1	6	[7]
(United States) E Butorac (South Africa) R Klaasen	7^{7}	7^{7}
WC	(France) P-H Herbert (France) N Mahut	6^{3}	6^{5}
WC	(France) J Chardy (France) K de Schepper	4	1
(Poland) Ł Kubot (Sweden) R Lindstedt	6	6

Second round
1	(United States) B Bryan (United States) M Bryan	6	6
(South Africa) K Anderson (Serbia) N Zimonjić	3	2
(India) L Paes (Switzerland) S Wawrinka	6	6
6	(Canada) V Pospisil (United States) J Sock	1	4
3	(France) J Benneteau (France) É Roger-Vasselin	4	5
(United States) E Butorac (South Africa) R Klaasen	6	7
(Poland) Ł Kubot (Sweden) R Lindstedt	6^{3}	6	[5]
8	(Netherlands) J-J Rojer (Romania) H Tecău	7^{7}	3	[10]

Quarterfinals
1	(United States) B Bryan (United States) M Bryan	6	6
(India) L Paes (Switzerland) S Wawrinka	3	3
(United States) E Butorac (South Africa) R Klaasen	7	1	[6]
8	(Netherlands) J-J Rojer (Romania) H Tecău	5	6	[10]

Semifinals
1	(United States) B Bryan (United States) M Bryan	6	6
8	(Netherlands) J-J Rojer (Romania) H Tecău	3	3

=== Bottom half ===
First round
(France) R Gasquet (France) J-W Tsonga	2	2
(Spain) D Marrero (Spain) F Verdasco	6	6
(Croatia) M Draganja (Czech Republic) L Rosol	4	7^{8}	[7]
PR	(Poland) M Matkowski (Austria) J Melzer	6	6^{6}	[10]
(France) G Monfils (France) G Simon	5	4
(Colombia) JS Cabal (Colombia) R Farah	7	6
(United States) J Isner (United States) S Querrey
Alt	(Uruguay) P Cuevas (Colombia) S Giraldo	w/o

Second round
7	(India) R Bopanna (Canada) D Nestor	6	6
(Spain) D Marrero (Spain) F Verdasco	4	0
PR	(Poland) M Matkowski (Austria) J Melzer	6	2
4	(Croatia) I Dodig (Brazil) M Melo	3	1^{r}
5	(Spain) M Granollers (Spain) M López	6	7^{7}
(Colombia) JS Cabal (Colombia) R Farah	3	6^{4}
Alt	(Uruguay) P Cuevas (Colombia) S Giraldo	6	7^{7}
2	(Austria) A Peya (Brazil) B Soares	4	6^{4}

Quarterfinals
7	(India) R Bopanna (Canada) D Nestor	4	6^{3}
PR	(Poland) M Matkowski (Austria) J Melzer	6	7^{7}
5	(Spain) M Granollers (Spain) M López	6	6
Alt	(Uruguay) P Cuevas (Colombia) S Giraldo	3	2

Semifinals
PR	(Poland) M Matkowski (Austria) J Melzer	6	6
5	(Spain) M Granollers (Spain) M López	2	3
