= 2014 Rogers Cup – Men's doubles =

Men's doubles
- 2014 Rogers Cup

Final
- Champions: (Austria) Alexander Peya (Brazil) Bruno Soares
- Runners-up: (Croatia) Ivan Dodig (Brazil) Marcelo Melo
- Score: 6–4, 6–3

Details
- Draw: 28
- Seeds: 8

Events
Singles	men	women
Doubles	men	women
- Rogers Cup

Alexander Peya and Bruno Soares were the defending champions and successfully defended the title, defeating Ivan Dodig and Marcelo Melo in the final, 6–4, 6–3.

== Seeds ==
All seeds receive a bye into the second round.

1. (United States) Bob Bryan / (United States) Mike Bryan (second round)
2. (Austria) Alexander Peya / (Brazil) Bruno Soares (champions)
3. (Canada) Daniel Nestor / (Serbia) Nenad Zimonjić (semifinals)
4. (Croatia) Ivan Dodig / (Brazil) Marcelo Melo (final)
5. (France) Julien Benneteau / (France) Édouard Roger-Vasselin (quarterfinals)
6. (India) Leander Paes / (Czech Republic) Radek Štěpánek (second round)
7. (Spain) Marcel Granollers / (Spain) Marc López (quarterfinals)
8. (France) Michaël Llodra / (France) Nicolas Mahut (second round)

== Draw ==
Key

- Q = Qualifier
- WC = Wild card
- LL = Lucky loser
- Alt = Alternate
- ITF = ITF entry
- PR = Protected ranking
- SR = Special ranking
- SE = Special exempt
- JE = Junior exempt
- JR = Junior Accelerator Programme entrant
- CO = College Accelerator Programme entrant
- NG = Next Gen Accelerator Program entrant
- w/o = Walkover
- r = Retired
- d = Defaulted

=== Finals ===
Semifinals

Final

- (Croatia) Marin Čilić
- (Mexico) Santiago González
3
2

4
- (Croatia) Ivan Dodig
- (Brazil) Marcelo Melo
6
6

4
- (Croatia) Ivan Dodig
- (Brazil) Marcelo Melo
4
3

2
- (Austria) Alexander Peya
- (Brazil) Bruno Soares
6
6

3
- (Canada) Daniel Nestor
- (Serbia) Nenad Zimonjić
4
6^{8}

2
- (Austria) Alexander Peya
- (Brazil) Bruno Soares
6
7^{10}

=== Top half ===
First round

Second round

Quarterfinals

Semifinals

1
- (United States) B Bryan
- (United States) M Bryan
2
4

WC
- (Canada) F Dancevic
- (Canada) A Shamasdin
4
6^{6}

- (Croatia) M Čilić
- (Mexico) S González
6
6

- (Croatia) M Čilić
- (Mexico) S González
6
7^{8}

- (Croatia) M Čilić
- (Mexico) S González
^{w/o}

- (France) R Gasquet
- (France) J-W Tsonga
w/o

- (France) R Gasquet
- (France) J-W Tsonga

WC
- (Canada) V Pospisil
- (United States) J Sock

- (France) R Gasquet
- (France) J-W Tsonga
7^{7}
6

6
- (India) L Paes
- (Czech Republic) R Štěpánek
6^{1}
4

- (Croatia) M Čilić
- (Mexico) S González
3
2

4
- (Croatia) I Dodig
- (Brazil) M Melo
6
6

4
- (Croatia) I Dodig
- (Brazil) M Melo
6
7^{11}

- (Italy) F Fognini
- (Poland) M Fyrstenberg
6
6

- (Italy) F Fognini
- (Poland) M Fyrstenberg
3
6^{9}

- (Latvia) E Gulbis
- (Russia) M Youzhny
3
1

4
- (Croatia) I Dodig
- (Brazil) M Melo
4
6
[10]

- (Philippines) T Huey
- (United Kingdom) D Inglot
6^{2}
6
[2]

7
- (Spain) M Granollers
- (Spain) M López
6
4
[8]

- (United Kingdom) J Murray
- (Australia) J Peers
7^{7}
4
[10]

- (United Kingdom) J Murray
- (Australia) J Peers
4
6
[3]

7
- (Spain) M Granollers
- (Spain) M López
6
4
[10]

=== Bottom half ===
First round

Second round

Quarterfinals

Semifinals

5
(France) J Benneteau
(France) É Roger-Vasselin
7
6

- (United States) E Butorac
- (South Africa) R Klaasen
6
3
[4]

- (India) R Bopanna
- (Pakistan) A-u-H Qureshi
5
4

- (India) R Bopanna
- (Pakistan) A-u-H Qureshi
2
6
[10]

5
(France) J Benneteau
(France) É Roger-Vasselin
6
3
[12]

- (Serbia) N Djokovic
- (Switzerland) S Wawrinka
6
7

3
- (Canada) D Nestor
- (Serbia) N Zimonjić
2
6
[14]

- (Colombia) JS Cabal
- (Spain) D Marrero
3
5

- (Serbia) N Djokovic
- (Switzerland) S Wawrinka
4
4

3
- (Canada) D Nestor
- (Serbia) N Zimonjić
6
6

3
- (Canada) D Nestor
- (Serbia) N Zimonjić
4
6^{8}

2
- (Austria) A Peya
- (Brazil) B Soares
6
7^{10}

8
- (France) M Llodra
- (France) N Mahut
6^{1}
1

- (Netherlands) J-J Rojer
- (Romania) H Tecău
6
6

- (Netherlands) J-J Rojer
- (Romania) H Tecău
7^{7}
6

PR
- (Spain) F López
- (Austria) J Melzer
4
4

- (Netherlands) J-J Rojer
- (Romania) H Tecău
6^{4}
4

- (Sweden) R Lindstedt
- (Poland) M Matkowski
2
6
[11]

2
- (Austria) A Peya
- (Brazil) B Soares
7^{7}
6

(Spain) D Ferrer
(Spain) G García López
6
1
[13]

(Spain) D Ferrer
(Spain) G García López
4
1

2
- (Austria) A Peya
- (Brazil) B Soares
6
6
