= 2012 BNP Paribas Masters – Doubles =

Doubles
- 2012 BNP Paribas Masters

Final
- Champions: (India) Mahesh Bhupathi (India) Rohan Bopanna
- Runners-up: (Pakistan) Aisam-ul-Haq Qureshi (Netherlands) Jean-Julien Rojer
- Score: 7–6^{(8–6)}, 6–3

Details
- Draw: 24
- Seeds: 8

Events
Singles	Doubles
← 2011 ·	BNP Paribas Masters	· 2013 →

Rohan Bopanna and Aisam-ul-Haq Qureshi were the defending champions but decided not to participate together.
Bopanna played alongside Mahesh Bhupathi and successfully defended the title, defeating Qureshi and his partner Jean-Julien Rojer 7–6^{(8–6)}, 6–3 in the final.

== Seeds ==
1. (United States) Bob Bryan / (United States) Mike Bryan (second round)
2. (Belarus) Max Mirnyi / (Canada) Daniel Nestor (quarterfinals)
3. (Sweden) Robert Lindstedt / (Romania) Horia Tecău (second round, retired)
4. (Poland) Mariusz Fyrstenberg / (Poland) Marcin Matkowski (quarterfinals)
5. (India) Mahesh Bhupathi / (India) Rohan Bopanna (champions)
6. (Austria) Jürgen Melzer / (India) Leander Paes (second round)
7. (Pakistan) Aisam-ul-Haq Qureshi / (Netherlands) Jean-Julien Rojer (final)
8. (Austria) Alexander Peya / (Brazil) Bruno Soares (quarterfinals)

== Draw ==
=== Key ===
- Q = Qualifier
- WC = Wild card
- LL = Lucky loser
- Alt = Alternate
- SE = Special exempt
- PR = Protected ranking
- ITF = ITF entry
- JE = Junior exempt
- w/o = Walkover
- r = Retired
- d = Defaulted
- SR = Special ranking

=== Finals ===
Semifinals
(Australia) Paul Hanley (United Kingdom) Jonathan Marray	5	3
5	(India) Mahesh Bhupathi (India) Rohan Bopanna	7	6
(Croatia) Marin Čilić (Brazil) Marcelo Melo	6	4	[9]
7	(Pakistan) Aisam-ul-Haq Qureshi (Netherlands) Jean-Julien Rojer	0	6	[11]

Final
5	(India) Mahesh Bhupathi (India) Rohan Bopanna	7^{8}	6
7	(Pakistan) Aisam-ul-Haq Qureshi (Netherlands) Jean-Julien Rojer	6^{6}	3

=== Top half ===
First round
(Germany) P Kohlschreiber (Germany) F Mayer	5	1
(Australia) P Hanley (United Kingdom) J Marray	7	6
(France) B Paire (Switzerland) S Wawrinka	3	4
WC	(France) J Ouanna (France) N Renavand	6	6
(United States) J Isner (United States) S Querrey	7^{7}	6^{4}	[7]
(United Kingdom) C Fleming (United Kingdom) R Hutchins	6^{4}	7^{7}	[10]
(Italy) D Bracciali (Czech Republic) F Čermák	4	4
WC	(France) J Benneteau (France) A Mannarino	6	6

Second round
1	(United States) B Bryan (United States) M Bryan	4	7^{7}	[5]
(Australia) P Hanley (United Kingdom) J Marray	6	6^{2}	[10]
WC	(France) J Ouanna (France) N Renavand	7^{7}	6
6	(Austria) J Melzer (India) L Paes	6^{5}	4
4	(Poland) M Fyrstenberg (Poland) M Matkowski	3	6	[10]
(United Kingdom) C Fleming (United Kingdom) R Hutchins	6	3	[5]
WC	(France) J Benneteau (France) A Mannarino	0	4
5	(India) M Bhupathi (India) R Bopanna	6	6

Quarterfinals
(Australia) P Hanley (United Kingdom) J Marray	7^{8}	7^{7}
WC	(France) J Ouanna (France) N Renavand	6^{6}	6^{5}
4	(Poland) M Fyrstenberg (Poland) M Matkowski	7^{7}	3	[4]
5	(India) M Bhupathi (India) R Bopanna	6^{5}	6	[10]

Semifinals
(Australia) P Hanley (United Kingdom) J Marray	5	3
5	(India) M Bhupathi (India) R Bopanna	7	6

=== Bottom half ===
First round
(Mexico) S González (United States) S Lipsky	6	4	[10]
Alt	(Argentina) C Berlocq (Uzbekistan) D Istomin	2	6	[4]
(France) J Chardy (Poland) Ł Kubot	3	4
(Croatia) M Čilić (Brazil) M Melo	6	6
(Spain) F López (Serbia) N Zimonjić	6	4	[11]
(France) M Llodra (France) É Roger-Vasselin	4	6	[9]
(Germany) C Kas (Italy) A Seppi	6^{10}	7^{7}	[10]
(Austria) J Knowle (Slovakia) F Polášek	7^{12}	6^{4}	[6]

Second round
8	(Austria) A Peya (Brazil) B Soares	6	3	[10]
(Mexico) S González (United States) S Lipsky	4	6	[5]
(Croatia) M Čilić (Brazil) M Melo	6	3
3	(Sweden) R Lindstedt (Romania) H Tecău	3	2^{r}
7	(Pakistan) A-u-H Qureshi (Netherlands) J-J Rojer	6	6^{3}	[17]
(Spain) F López (Serbia) N Zimonjić	4	7^{7}	[15]
(Germany) C Kas (Italy) A Seppi	6^{3}	2
2	(Belarus) M Mirnyi (Canada) D Nestor	7^{7}	6

Quarterfinals
8	(Austria) A Peya (Brazil) B Soares	6	4	[7]
(Croatia) M Čilić (Brazil) M Melo	4	6	[10]
7	(Pakistan) A-u-H Qureshi (Netherlands) J-J Rojer	6	6
2	(Belarus) M Mirnyi (Canada) D Nestor	3	4

Semifinals
(Croatia) M Čilić (Brazil) M Melo	6	4	[7]
7	(Pakistan) A-u-H Qureshi (Netherlands) J-J Rojer	0	6	[11]
