= 2007 Mutua Madrileña Masters Madrid – Doubles =

Doubles
- 2007 Mutua Madrileña Masters Madrid

Final
- Champions: (United States) Bob Bryan (United States) Mike Bryan
- Runners-up: (Poland) Mariusz Fyrstenberg (Poland) Marcin Matkowski
- Score: 6–3, 7–6^{(7–4)}

Events
Singles	Doubles
← 2006 ·	Mutua Madrileña Masters Madrid	· 2008 →

Bob Bryan and Mike Bryan were the defending champions, and won in the final 6–3, 7–6^{(7–4)}, against Mariusz Fyrstenberg and Marcin Matkowski.

== Seeds ==
All seeds receive a bye into the second round.

1. (United States) Bob Bryan / (United States) Mike Bryan (champions)
2. (Serbia) Nenad Zimonjić / (Canada) Daniel Nestor (second round)
3. (Australia) Paul Hanley / (Zimbabwe) Kevin Ullyett (second round)
4. (Sweden) Jonas Björkman / (Belarus) Max Mirnyi (semifinals)
5. (Sweden) Simon Aspelin / (Austria) Julian Knowle (quarterfinals)
6. (Romania) Andrei Pavel / (Czech Republic) Pavel Vízner (quarterfinals)
7. (Czech Republic) Martin Damm / (India) Leander Paes (second round)
8. (The Bahamas) Mark Knowles / (United Kingdom) Jamie Murray (second round)

== Draw ==
=== Key ===
- Q = Qualifier
- WC = Wild card
- LL = Lucky loser
- Alt = Alternate
- SE = Special exempt
- PR = Protected ranking
- ITF = ITF entry
- JE = Junior exempt
- w/o = Walkover
- r = Retired
- d = Defaulted
- SR = Special ranking

=== Finals ===
Semifinals
1	(United States) Bob Bryan (United States) Mike Bryan	6	2	[10]
(Argentina) Guillermo Cañas (Argentina) David Nalbandian	1	6	[4]
4	(Sweden) Jonas Björkman (Belarus) Max Mirnyi	6^{4}	7	[4]
(Poland) Mariusz Fyrstenberg (Poland) Marcin Matkowski	7	5	[10]

Final
1	(United States) Bob Bryan (United States) Mike Bryan	6	7
(Poland) Mariusz Fyrstenberg (Poland) Marcin Matkowski	3	6^{4}

=== Top half ===
First round
WC	(Croatia) I Karlović (Spain) F Verdasco	6	6^{4}	[10]
(Sweden) R Lindstedt (Finland) J Nieminen	4	7	[7]
(Czech Republic) F Čermák (France) A Clément	6	6
(Czech Republic) T Berdych (Germany) N Kiefer	4	3
(Argentina) G Cañas (Argentina) D Nalbandian	6	4	[12]
WC	(Brazil) G Kuerten (Spain) C Moyá	3	6	[10]
(Spain) N Almagro (Spain) D Ferrer	3	7	[10]
(Israel) J Erlich (Israel) A Ram	6	6^{4}	[4]

Second round
1	(United States) B Bryan (United States) M Bryan	6	6
WC	(Croatia) I Karlović (Spain) F Verdasco	4	3
(Czech Republic) F Čermák (France) A Clément	4	4
6	(Romania) A Pavel (Czech Republic) P Vízner	6	6
3	(Australia) P Hanley (Zimbabwe) K Ullyett	3	1
(Argentina) G Cañas (Argentina) D Nalbandian	6	6
(Spain) N Almagro (Spain) D Ferrer	4	2
5	(Sweden) S Aspelin (Austria) J Knowle	6	6

Quarterfinals
1	(United States) B Bryan (United States) M Bryan	6	7
6	(Romania) A Pavel (Czech Republic) P Vízner	3	6^{4}
(Argentina) G Cañas (Argentina) D Nalbandian	6	3	[10]
5	(Sweden) S Aspelin (Austria) J Knowle	3	6	[7]

Semifinals
1	(United States) B Bryan (United States) M Bryan	6	2	[10]
(Argentina) G Cañas (Argentina) D Nalbandian	1	6	[4]

=== Bottom half ===
First round
(Australia) J Kerr (Australia) T Perry	6	7
(Switzerland) Y Allegro (France) F Santoro	3	6^{3}
(Spain) R Nadal (Spain) F López	7	3	[9]
(Chile) F González (Brazil) A Sá	6^{6}	6	[11]
(United States) J Blake (United States) E Butorac	5	4
(Poland) M Fyrstenberg (Poland) M Matkowski	7	6
(Argentina) JI Chela (Argentina) J Mónaco	2	2
(South Africa) J Coetzee (Netherlands) R Wassen	6	6

Second round
7	(Czech Republic) M Damm (India) L Paes	2	3
(Australia) J Kerr (Australia) T Perry	6	6
(Chile) F González (Brazil) A Sá	6^{5}	4
4	(Sweden) J Björkman (Belarus) M Mirnyi	7	6
8	(The Bahamas) M Knowles (United Kingdom) J Murray	4	6^{2}
(Poland) M Fyrstenberg (Poland) M Matkowski	6	7
(South Africa) J Coetzee (Netherlands) R Wassen	6	6
2	(Canada) D Nestor (Serbia) N Zimonjić	4	4

Quarterfinals
(Australia) J Kerr (Australia) T Perry	1	2
4	(Sweden) J Björkman (Belarus) M Mirnyi	6	6
(Poland) M Fyrstenberg (Poland) M Matkowski	2	7	[10]
(South Africa) J Coetzee (Netherlands) R Wassen	6	6^{4}	[4]

Semifinals
4	(Sweden) J Björkman (Belarus) M Mirnyi	6^{4}	7	[6]
(Poland) M Fyrstenberg (Poland) M Matkowski	7	5	[10]
