= Marcin Matkowski =

Polish tennis player

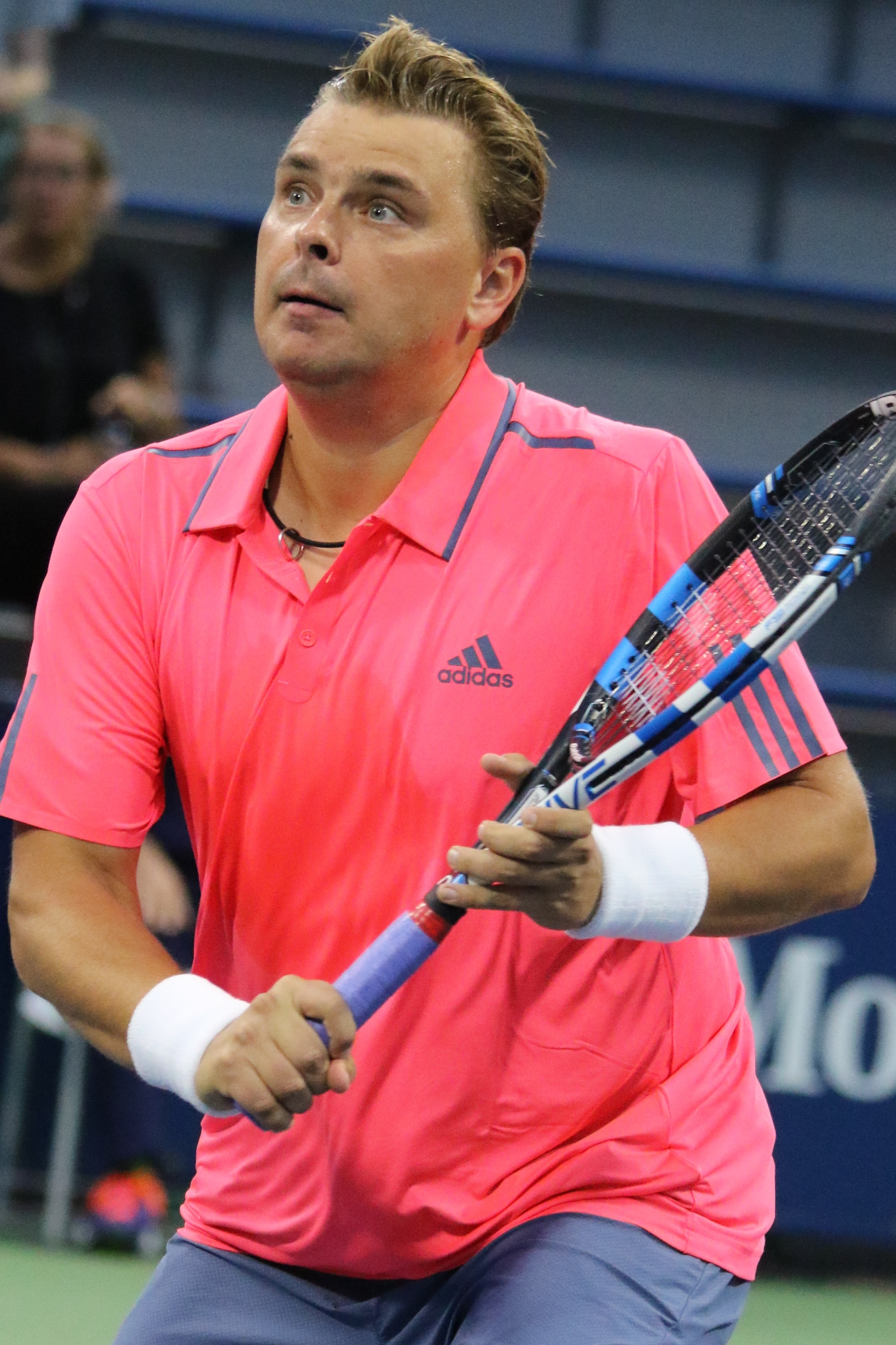
- Matkowski at the 2016 US Open
- Country (sports): Poland
- Residence: Warsaw, Poland
- Born: 15 January 1981 (age 44) Barlinek, Poland
- Height: 1.88 m (6 ft 2 in)
- Turned pro: 2003
- Retired: 2019
- Plays: Right-handed (two-handed backhand)
- College: UCLA
- Prize money: US$4,044,710

Singles
- Career record: 4–4
- Career titles: 0
- Highest ranking: No. 647 (11 September 2000)

Doubles
- Career record: 472–387
- Career titles: 18
- Highest ranking: No. 7 (9 July 2012)

Grand Slam doubles results
- Australian Open: SF (2006)
- French Open: QF (2010, 2013, 2015)
- Wimbledon: QF (2015, 2017)
- US Open: F (2011)

Other doubles tournaments
- Tour Finals: F (2011)
- Olympic Games: QF (2008)

Grand Slam mixed doubles results
- Australian Open: SF (2013)
- French Open: F (2015)
- Wimbledon: QF (2007, 2013, 2015, 2016)
- US Open: F (2012)

Marcin Matkowski (Polish pronunciation: [ˈmartɕin matˈkɔfskʲi]; born 15 January 1981) is a Polish former professional tennis player whose speciality is in doubles. He played college tennis at UCLA, where Jean-Julien Rojer was one of his teammates. Matkowski and Mariusz Fyrstenberg won the Madrid Open twice, in addition to reaching the final at the US Open. The duo also reached the final of the ATP Finals and participated six times at the event overall. Matkowski won 18 doubles title in his career and achieved a highest ranking in doubles of world No. 7 in July 2012.

== Grand Slam tournament finals ==
=== Doubles: 1 (1 runner-up) ===
Result	Year	Championship	Surface	Partner	Opponents	Score
Loss	2011	US Open	Hard	(Poland) Mariusz Fyrstenberg	(Austria) Jürgen Melzer (Germany) Philipp Petzschner	2–6, 2–6

=== Mixed doubles: 2 (2 runner-ups) ===
Result	Year	Championship	Surface	Partner	Opponents	Score
Loss	2012	US Open	Hard	(Czech Republic) Květa Peschke	(Russia) Ekaterina Makarova (Brazil) Bruno Soares	7–6^{(10–8)}, 1–6, [10–12]
Loss	2015	French Open	Clay	(Czech Republic) Lucie Hradecká	(United States) Bethanie Mattek-Sands (United States) Mike Bryan	6–7^{(3–7)}, 1–6

== Other significant finals ==
=== Year-end championships ===
==== Doubles: 1 (1 runner-up) ====
Result	Year	Championship	Surface	Partner	Opponents	Score
Loss	2011	ATP World Tour Finals, London	Hard (i)	(Poland) Mariusz Fyrstenberg	(Belarus) Max Mirnyi (Canada) Daniel Nestor	5–7, 3–6

=== ATP 1000 finals ===
==== Doubles: 9 (2 titles, 7 runner-ups) ====
Result	Year	Tournament	Surface	Partner	Opponents	Score
Loss	2007	Madrid Open	Hard (i)	(Poland) Mariusz Fyrstenberg	(United States) Bob Bryan (United States) Mike Bryan	3–6, 6–7^{(4–7)}
Win	2008	Madrid Open	Hard (i)	(Poland) Mariusz Fyrstenberg	(India) Mahesh Bhupathi (The Bahamas) Mark Knowles	6–2, 6–4
Loss	2009	Shanghai Masters	Hard	(Poland) Mariusz Fyrstenberg	(France) Julien Benneteau (France) Jo-Wilfried Tsonga	2–6, 4–6
Loss	2010	Shanghai Masters	Hard	(Poland) Mariusz Fyrstenberg	(Austria) Jürgen Melzer (India) Leander Paes	5–7, 6–4, [5–10]
Win	2012	Madrid Open (2)	Clay	(Poland) Mariusz Fyrstenberg	(Sweden) Robert Lindstedt (Romania) Horia Tecău	6–3, 6–4
Loss	2013	Miami Open	Hard	(Poland) Mariusz Fyrstenberg	(Pakistan) Aisam-ul-Haq Qureshi (Netherlands) Jean-Julien Rojer	4–6, 1–6
Loss	2014	Paris Masters	Hard (i)	(Austria) Jürgen Melzer	(United States) Bob Bryan (United States) Mike Bryan	6–7^{(5–7)}, 7–5, [6–10]
Loss	2015	Madrid Open	Clay	(Serbia) Nenad Zimonjić	(India) Rohan Bopanna (Romania) Florin Mergea	2–6, 7–6^{(7–5)}, [9–11]
Loss	2015	Cincinnati Masters	Hard	(Serbia) Nenad Zimonjić	(Canada) Daniel Nestor (France) Édouard Roger-Vasselin	2–6, 2–6

== ATP career finals ==
=== Doubles: 48 (18 titles, 30 runner-ups) ===
Legend Grand Slam tournaments (0–1) Tennis Masters Cup / ATP World Tour Finals (0–1) ATP Masters Series / ATP World Tour Masters 1000 (2–7) ATP International Series Gold / ATP World Tour 500 Series (4–7) ATP International Series / ATP World Tour 250 Series (12–14)	Titles by surface Hard (7–18) Clay (9–9) Grass (2–2) Carpet (0–1)	Titles by setting Outdoor (13–22) Indoor (5–8)

Result	W–L	Date	Tournament	Tier	Surface	Partner	Opponents	Score
Win	1–0	Aug 2003	Sopot Open, Poland	International	Clay	(Poland) Mariusz Fyrstenberg	(Czech Republic) František Čermák (Czech Republic) Leoš Friedl	6–4, 6–7^{(7–9)}, 6–3
Win	2–0	Feb 2004	Brasil Open, Brazil	International	Clay	(Poland) Mariusz Fyrstenberg	(Germany) Tomas Behrend (Czech Republic) Leoš Friedl	6–2, 6–2
Win	3–0	Aug 2005	Sopot Open, Poland (2)	International	Clay	(Poland) Mariusz Fyrstenberg	(Argentina) Lucas Arnold Ker (Argentina) Sebastián Prieto	7–6^{(9–7)}, 6–4
Loss	3–1	Sep 2005	Campionati Internazionali di Sicilia, Italy	International	Clay	(Poland) Mariusz Fyrstenberg	(Argentina) Martín García (Argentina) Mariano Hood	2–6, 3–6
Loss	3–2	Feb 2006	Brasil Open, Brazil	International	Clay	(Poland) Mariusz Fyrstenberg	(Czech Republic) Lukáš Dlouhý (Czech Republic) Pavel Vízner	1–6, 6–4, [3–10]
Loss	3–3	Apr 2006	Barcelona Open, Spain	Intl. Gold	Clay	(Poland) Mariusz Fyrstenberg	(The Bahamas) Mark Knowles (Canada) Daniel Nestor	2–6, 7–6^{(7–4)}, [5–10]
Loss	3–4	Aug 2006	Connecticut Open, US	International	Hard	(Poland) Mariusz Fyrstenberg	(Israel) Jonathan Erlich (Israel) Andy Ram	3–6, 3–6
Win	4–4	Sep 2006	Romanian Open, Romania	International	Clay	(Poland) Mariusz Fyrstenberg	(Argentina) Martín García (Peru) Luis Horna	6–7^{(5–7)}, 7–6^{(7–5)}, [10–8]
Loss	4–5	Oct 2006	Campionati Internazionali di Sicilia, Italy	International	Clay	(Poland) Mariusz Fyrstenberg	(Argentina) Martín García (Peru) Luis Horna	6–7^{(1–7)}, 6–7^{(2–7)}
Loss	4–6	Oct 2006	Swiss Indoors, Switzerland	International	Carpet (i)	(Poland) Mariusz Fyrstenberg	(The Bahamas) Mark Knowles (Canada) Daniel Nestor	6–4, 4–6, [8–10]
Win	5–6	Aug 2007	Sopot Open, Poland (3)	International	Clay	(Poland) Mariusz Fyrstenberg	(Argentina) Martín García (Argentina) Sebastián Prieto	6–1, 6–1
Loss	5–7	Aug 2007	Connecticut Open, US	International	Hard	(Poland) Mariusz Fyrstenberg	(India) Mahesh Bhupathi (Serbia) Nenad Zimonjić	3–6, 3–6
Loss	5–8	Oct 2007	Open de Moselle, France	International	Hard (i)	(Poland) Mariusz Fyrstenberg	(France) Arnaud Clément (France) Michaël Llodra	1–6, 4–6
Win	6–8	Oct 2007	Vienna Open, Austria	Intl. Gold	Hard (i)	(Poland) Mariusz Fyrstenberg	(Germany) Tomas Behrend (Germany) Christopher Kas	6–4, 6–2
Loss	6–9	Oct 2007	Madrid Open, Spain	Masters	Hard (i)	(Poland) Mariusz Fyrstenberg	(United States) Bob Bryan (United States) Mike Bryan	3–6, 6–7^{(4–7)}
Loss	6–10	Apr 2008	Barcelona Open, Spain	Intl. Gold	Clay	(Poland) Mariusz Fyrstenberg	(United States) Bob Bryan (United States) Mike Bryan	3–6, 2–6
Win	7–10	Jun 2008	Warsaw Open, Poland (4)	International	Clay	(Poland) Mariusz Fyrstenberg	(Russia) Nikolay Davydenko (Kazakhstan) Yuri Schukin	6–0, 3–6, [10–4]
Loss	7–11	Sep 2008	Romanian Open, Romania	International	Clay	(Poland) Mariusz Fyrstenberg	(France) Nicolas Devilder (France) Paul-Henri Mathieu	6–7^{(4–7)}, 7–6^{(11–9)}, [20–22]
Loss	7–12	Oct 2008	Open de Moselle, France	International	Hard (i)	(Poland) Mariusz Fyrstenberg	(France) Arnaud Clément (France) Michaël Llodra	7–5, 3–6, [8–10]
Win	8–12	Oct 2008	Madrid Open, Spain	Masters	Hard (i)	(Poland) Mariusz Fyrstenberg	(India) Mahesh Bhupathi (The Bahamas) Mark Knowles	6–4, 6–2
Win	9–12	Jun 2009	Eastbourne International, UK	250 Series	Grass	(Poland) Mariusz Fyrstenberg	(United States) Travis Parrott (Slovakia) Filip Polášek	6–4, 6–4
Loss	9–13	Aug 2009	Washington Open, US	500 Series	Hard	(Poland) Mariusz Fyrstenberg	(Czech Republic) Martin Damm (Sweden) Robert Lindstedt	7–5, 7–6^{(7–3)}
Win	10–13	Oct 2009	Malaysian Open, Malaysia	250 Series	Hard (i)	(Poland) Mariusz Fyrstenberg	(Russia) Igor Kunitsyn (Czech Republic) Jaroslav Levinský	6–2, 6–1
Loss	10–14	Oct 2009	Shanghai Masters, China	Masters 1000	Hard	(Poland) Mariusz Fyrstenberg	(France) Julien Benneteau (France) Jo-Wilfried Tsonga	2–6, 4–6
Win	11–14	Jun 2010	Eastbourne International, UK (2)	250 Series	Grass	(Poland) Mariusz Fyrstenberg	(United Kingdom) Colin Fleming (United Kingdom) Ken Skupski	6–3, 5–7, [10–8]
Loss	11–15	Oct 2010	Malaysian Open, Malaysia	250 Series	Hard (i)	(Poland) Mariusz Fyrstenberg	(Czech Republic) František Čermák (Slovakia) Michal Mertiňák	6–7^{(3–7)}, 6–7^{(5–7)}
Loss	11–16	Oct 2010	China Open, China	500 Series	Hard	(Poland) Mariusz Fyrstenberg	(United States) Bob Bryan (United States) Mike Bryan	1–6, 6–7^{(5–7)}
Loss	11–17	Oct 2010	Shanghai Masters, China	Masters 1000	Hard	(Poland) Mariusz Fyrstenberg	(Austria) Jürgen Melzer (India) Leander Paes	5–7, 6–4, [5–10]
Loss	11–18	Oct 2010	Vienna Open, Austria	250 Series	Hard (i)	(Poland) Mariusz Fyrstenberg	(Canada) Daniel Nestor (Serbia) Nenad Zimonjić	5–7, 6–3, [5–10]
Loss	11–19	Sep 2011	US Open, US	Grand Slam	Hard	(Poland) Mariusz Fyrstenberg	(Austria) Jürgen Melzer (Germany) Philipp Petzschner	2–6, 2–6
Loss	11–20	Nov 2011	ATP World Tour Finals, UK	Tour Finals	Hard (i)	(Poland) Mariusz Fyrstenberg	(Belarus) Max Mirnyi (Canada) Daniel Nestor	5–7, 3–6
Loss	11–21	Mar 2012	Dubai Tennis Championships, UAE	500 Series	Hard	(Poland) Mariusz Fyrstenberg	(India) Mahesh Bhupathi (India) Rohan Bopanna	4–6, 6–3, [5–10]
Win	12–21	Apr 2012	Barcelona Open, Spain	500 Series	Clay	(Poland) Mariusz Fyrstenberg	(Spain) Marcel Granollers (Spain) Marc López	2–6, 7–6^{(9–7)}, [10–8]
Win	13–21	May 2012	Madrid Open, Spain (2)	Masters 1000	Clay	(Poland) Mariusz Fyrstenberg	(Sweden) Robert Lindstedt (Romania) Horia Tecău	6–3, 6–4
Loss	13–22	Mar 2013	Miami Open, US	Masters 1000	Hard	(Poland) Mariusz Fyrstenberg	(Pakistan) Aisam-ul-Haq Qureshi (Netherlands) Jean-Julien Rojer	4–6, 1–6
Win	14–22	Jul 2013	German Open, Germany	500 Series	Clay	(Poland) Mariusz Fyrstenberg	(Austria) Alexander Peya (Brazil) Bruno Soares	3–6, 6–1, [10–8]
Loss	14–23	Apr 2014	Romanian Open, Romania	250 Series	Clay	(Poland) Mariusz Fyrstenberg	(Netherlands) Jean-Julien Rojer (Romania) Horia Tecău	4–6, 4–6
Win	15–23	Sep 2014	Moselle Open, France	250 Series	Hard (i)	(Poland) Mariusz Fyrstenberg	(Croatia) Marin Draganja (Finland) Henri Kontinen	6–7^{(3–7)}, 6–3, [10–8]
Win	16–23	Sep 2014	Malaysian Open, Malaysia (2)	250 Series	Hard (i)	(India) Leander Paes	(United Kingdom) Jamie Murray (Australia) John Peers	3–6, 7–6^{(7–5)}, [10–5]
Loss	16–24	Nov 2014	Paris Masters, France	Masters 1000	Hard (i)	(Austria) Jürgen Melzer	(United States) Bob Bryan (United States) Mike Bryan	6–7^{(5–7)}, 7–5, [6–10]
Loss	16–25	May 2015	Madrid Open, Spain	Masters 1000	Clay	(Serbia) Nenad Zimonjić	(India) Rohan Bopanna (Romania) Florin Mergea	2–6, 7–6^{(7–5)}, [9–11]
Loss	16–26	Jun 2015	Queen's Club Championships, UK	500 Series	Grass	(Serbia) Nenad Zimonjić	(France) Pierre-Hugues Herbert (France) Nicolas Mahut	2–6, 2–6
Loss	16–27	Aug 2015	Cincinnati Masters, US	Masters 1000	Hard	(Serbia) Nenad Zimonjić	(Canada) Daniel Nestor (France) Édouard Roger-Vasselin	2–6, 2–6
Loss	16–28	May 2016	Estoril Open, Portugal	250 Series	Clay	(Poland) Łukasz Kubot	(United States) Eric Butorac (United States) Scott Lipsky	4–6, 6–3, [8–10]
Win	17–28	Oct 2016	Japan Open, Japan	500 Series	Hard	(Spain) Marcel Granollers	(South Africa) Raven Klaasen (United States) Rajeev Ram	6–2, 7–6^{(7–4)}
Win	18–28	Jan 2017	Auckland Open, New Zealand	250 Series	Hard	(Pakistan) Aisam-ul-Haq Qureshi	(Israel) Jonathan Erlich (United States) Scott Lipsky	1–6, 6–2, [10–3]
Loss	18–29	Mar 2017	Dubai Tennis Championships, UAE	500 Series	Hard	(India) Rohan Bopanna	(Netherlands) Jean-Julien Rojer (Romania) Horia Tecău	6–4, 3–6, [3–10]
Loss	18–30	Jun 2018	Stuttgart Open, Germany	250 Series	Grass	(Sweden) Robert Lindstedt	(Germany) Philipp Petzschner (Germany) Tim Pütz	6–7^{(5–7)}, 3–6

== Performance timeline ==
=== Doubles ===
Key
W	F	SF	QF	#R	RR	Q#	P#	DNQ	A	Z#	PO	G	S	B	NMS	NTI	P	NH

(W) winner; (F) finalist; (SF) semifinalist; (QF) quarterfinalist; (#R) rounds 4, 3, 2, 1; (RR) round-robin stage; (Q#) qualification round; (P#) preliminary round; (DNQ) did not qualify; (A) absent; (Z#) Davis/Fed Cup Zonal Group (with number indication) or (PO) play-off; (G) gold, (S) silver or (B) bronze Olympic/Paralympic medal; (NMS) not a Masters tournament; (NTI) not a Tier I tournament; (P) postponed; (NH) not held; (SR) strike rate (events won / competed); (W–L) win–loss record.
To avoid confusion and double counting, these charts are updated at the conclusion of a tournament or when the player's participation has ended.

Tournament	2003	2004	2005	2006	2007	2008	2009	2010	2011	2012	2013	2014	2015	2016	W–L
Grand Slam tournaments
Australian Open	A	A	1R	SF	1R	3R	QF	2R	QF	QF	1R	3R	2R	2R	20–12
French Open	A	3R	3R	2R	1R	2R	2R	QF	1R	3R	QF	1R	QF	QF	21–13
Wimbledon	A	2R	2R	1R	1R	1R	1R	2R	1R	1R	3R	2R	QF	2R	11–13
US Open	A	2R	1R	3R	3R	1R	1R	QF	F	1R	1R	3R	QF	2R	19–13
Win–loss	0–0	4–3	3–4	7–4	2–4	3–4	4–4	8–4	8–4	5–4	5–4	5–4	10–4	6–4	71–51
Year-end championship
ATP World Tour Finals	A	A	A	RR	A	SF	RR	SF	F	A	RR	A	RR	A	10–15
Olympic Games
Doubles	NH	1R	Not Held			QF	Not Held			1R	Not Held			2R	3–4
ATP Masters Series 1000
Indian Wells	A	1R	A	2R	2R	1R	QF	1R	1R	SF	1R	1R	SF	2R	10–12
Miami	A	1R	A	1R	1R	2R	1R	SF	1R	1R	F	1R	1R	1R	7–12
Monte Carlo	A	2R	A	QF	2R	2R	QF	2R	SF	2R	2R	2R	SF	2R	12–12
Rome	A	A	A	2R	A	QF	QF	1R	2R	QF	1R	1R	2R	QF	7–10
Madrid	A	A	A	QF	F	W	2R	QF	QF	W	2R	QF	F	2R	21–10
Canada	A	A	A	1R	1R	1R	QF	2R	QF	QF	SF	1R	QF	2R	7–11
Cincinnati	A	A	A	1R	2R	QF	QF	QF	QF	QF	QF	QF	F	2R	12–12
Shanghai	Not Held		Not Masters Series				F	F	SF	2R	2R	2R	QF	2R	11–8
Paris	A	A	A	QF	2R	SF	SF	2R	QF	QF	2R	F	2R	1R	14–10
Hamburg	A	A	A	2R	2R	2R	Not Masters Series								3–3
Win–loss	0–0	1–3	0–0	7–9	7–8	13–8	10–9	8–9	8–9	9–8	11–9	10–9	13–9	7–8	104–100
Career Statistics
Titles–Finals	1–1	1–1	1–2	1–6	2–5	2–5	2–4	1–5	0–2	2–3	1–2	2–4	0–3	1–2	17–45
