= 2014 BNP Paribas Masters – Singles =

Singles
- 2014 BNP Paribas Masters

Final
- Champion: (Serbia) Novak Djokovic
- Runner-up: (Canada) Milos Raonic
- Score: 6–2, 6–3

Details
- Draw: 48 (6 Q / 3 WC)
- Seeds: 16

Events
Singles	Doubles
← 2013 ·	BNP Paribas Masters	· 2015 →

Defending champion Novak Djokovic defeated Milos Raonic in the final, 6–2, 6–3 to win the singles tennis title at the 2014 Paris Masters. He became the first man to defend the title at the Paris Masters, and it was his record-equaling third title at the event (tying Boris Becker and Marat Safin). He did not lose a single set in the entire tournament.

== Seeds ==
All seeds receive a bye into the second round.

1. (Serbia) Novak Djokovic (champion)
2. (Switzerland) Roger Federer (quarterfinals)
3. (Switzerland) Stan Wawrinka (third round)
4. (Spain) David Ferrer (quarterfinals)
5. (Czech Republic) Tomáš Berdych (semifinals)
6. (Japan) Kei Nishikori (semifinals)
7. (Canada) Milos Raonic (final)
8. (United Kingdom) Andy Murray (quarterfinals)
9. (Bulgaria) Grigor Dimitrov (third round)
10. (France) Jo-Wilfried Tsonga (third round)
11. (Spain) Roberto Bautista Agut (third round)
12. (Spain) Feliciano López (third round)
13. (United States) John Isner (second round)
14. (South Africa) Kevin Anderson (quarterfinals)
15. (France) Gilles Simon (second round)
16. (Italy) Fabio Fognini (second round)

Click on the seed number of a player to go to their draw section.

== Draw ==
=== Key ===
- Q = Qualifier
- WC = Wild card
- LL = Lucky loser
- Alt = Alternate
- SE = Special exempt
- PR = Protected ranking
- ITF = ITF entry
- JE = Junior exempt
- w/o = Walkover
- r = Retired
- d = Defaulted
- SR = Special ranking

=== Finals ===
Quarterfinals
1	(Serbia) Novak Djokovic	7	6
8	(United Kingdom) Andy Murray	5	2
4	(Spain) David Ferrer	6	6^{5}	4
6	(Japan) Kei Nishikori	3	7^{7}	6
5	(Czech Republic) Tomáš Berdych	6^{4}	6	6
14	(South Africa) Kevin Anderson	7^{7}	4	4
7	(Canada) Milos Raonic	7^{7}	7
2	(Switzerland) Roger Federer	6^{5}	5

Semifinals
1	(Serbia) Novak Djokovic	6	6
6	(Japan) Kei Nishikori	2	3
5	(Czech Republic) Tomáš Berdych	3	6	5
7	(Canada) Milos Raonic	6	3	7

Final
1	(Serbia) Novak Djokovic	6	6
7	(Canada) Milos Raonic	2	3

=== Top half ===
==== Section 1 ====
First round
(Germany) P Kohlschreiber	6	6
WC	(France) É Roger-Vasselin	3	1
(Portugal) J Sousa	1	4
(France) G Monfils	6	6
(Argentina) L Mayer	6^{3}	0^{r}
(Uruguay) P Cuevas	7^{7}	1
(Chinese Taipei) Y-h Lu	3	4
(France) J Benneteau	6	6

Second round
1	(Serbia) N Djokovic	6	6
(Germany) P Kohlschreiber	3	4
(France) G Monfils	6	7^{7}
13	(United States) J Isner	4	6^{4}
9	(Bulgaria) G Dimitrov	6	6
(Uruguay) P Cuevas	0	3
(France) J Benneteau	3	4
8	(United Kingdom) A Murray	6	6

Third round
1	(Serbia) N Djokovic	6	7^{7}
(France) G Monfils	3	6^{2}
9	(Bulgaria) G Dimitrov	3	3
8	(United Kingdom) A Murray	6	6

Quarterfinals
1	(Serbia) N Djokovic	7	6
8	(United Kingdom) A Murray	5	2

==== Section 2 ====
First round
(Czech Republic) L Rosol	4	3
SE	(Belgium) D Goffin	6	6
Q	(United States) D Young	6	1	3
(Spain) F Verdasco	4	6	6
PR	(Austria) J Melzer	6	6
(Spain) G García López	4	1
(Spain) T Robredo	6	4	7^{7}
(Canada) V Pospisil	3	6	6^{5}

Second round
4	(Spain) D Ferrer	6	2	6
SE	(Belgium) D Goffin	3	6	3
(Spain) F Verdasco	6	3	6
15	(France) G Simon	3	6	4
10	(France) J-W Tsonga	6	4	6
PR	(Austria) J Melzer	2	6	2
(Spain) T Robredo	7^{7}	2	3
6	(Japan) K Nishikori	6^{4}	6	6

Third round
4	(Spain) D Ferrer	6	6
(Spain) F Verdasco	1	2
10	(France) J-W Tsonga	1	6	4
6	(Japan) K Nishikori	6	4	6

Quarterfinals
4	(Spain) D Ferrer	6	6^{5}	4
6	(Japan) K Nishikori	3	7^{7}	6

=== Bottom half ===
==== Section 3 ====
First round
WC	(France) P-H Herbert	6^{3}	3
WC	(France) A Mannarino	7^{7}	6
(Poland) J Janowicz	7^{7}	2	4
Q	(United States) S Querrey	6^{5}	6	6
(Russia) M Youzhny	2	4
(Colombia) S Giraldo	6	6
(Austria) D Thiem	6	4	6
(Ukraine) A Dolgopolov	2	6	0

Second round
5	(Czech Republic) T Berdych	6	6^{3}	6
WC	(France) A Mannarino	4	7^{7}	2
Q	(United States) S Querrey	4	4
12	(Spain) F López	6	6
14	(South Africa) K Anderson	6	7^{10}
(Colombia) S Giraldo	4	6^{8}
(Austria) D Thiem	4	6^{6}
3	(Switzerland) S Wawrinka	6	7^{8}

Third round
5	(Czech Republic) T Berdych	7	6
12	(Spain) F López	5	3
14	(South Africa) K Anderson	6^{2}	7	7^{7}
3	(Switzerland) S Wawrinka	7^{7}	5	6^{3}

Quarterfinals
5	(Czech Republic) T Berdych	6^{4}	6	6
14	(South Africa) K Anderson	7^{7}	4	4

==== Section 4 ====
First round
Q	(United States) J Sock	6	6
(Spain) P Andújar	1	1
(France) R Gasquet	6^{4}	6	4
Q	(Uzbekistan) D Istomin	7^{7}	2	0^{r}
(Croatia) I Karlović	1	4
Q	(France) L Pouille	6	6
Q	(France) K de Schepper	6^{5}	6^{4}
(France) J Chardy	7^{7}	7^{7}

Second round
7	(Canada) M Raonic	6	5	7^{7}
Q	(United States) J Sock	3	7	6^{4}
(France) R Gasquet	4	2
11	(Spain) R Bautista Agut	6	6
16	(Italy) F Fognini	6^{5}	6^{7}
Q	(France) L Pouille	7^{7}	7^{9}
(France) J Chardy	6^{5}	7^{7}	4
2	(Switzerland) R Federer	7^{7}	6^{5}	6

Third round
7	(Canada) M Raonic	7	7^{9}
11	(Spain) R Bautista Agut	5	6^{7}
Q	(France) L Pouille	4	4
2	(Switzerland) R Federer	6	6

Quarterfinals
7	(Canada) M Raonic	7^{7}	7
2	(Switzerland) R Federer	6^{5}	5

== Qualifying ==
=== Seeds ===
1. (United States) Sam Querrey (qualified)
2. (United States) Steve Johnson (first round)
3. (United States) Jack Sock (qualified)
4. (Germany) Jan-Lennard Struff (first round)
5. (Luxembourg) Gilles Müller (qualifying competition)
6. (Italy) Andreas Seppi (first round)
7. (Uzbekistan) Denis Istomin (qualified)
8. (Australia) Bernard Tomic (qualifying competition)
9. (Finland) Jarkko Nieminen (qualifying competition)
10. (Ukraine) Sergiy Stakhovsky (qualifying competition)
11. (Argentina) Federico Delbonis (qualifying competition)
12. (Russia) Teymuraz Gabashvili (first round)

=== Qualifiers ===
1. (United States) Sam Querrey
2. (France) Lucas Pouille
3. (United States) Jack Sock
4. (United States) Donald Young
5. (Uzbekistan) Denis Istomin
6. (France) Kenny de Schepper

=== Qualifying draw ===
==== First qualifier ====
First round
1	(United States) Sam Querrey	6	6
WC	(France) Axel Michon	4	3
(Serbia) Dušan Lajović	6	4	1
11	(Argentina) Federico Delbonis	4	6	6

Qualifying competition
1	(United States) Sam Querrey	6	6
11	(Argentina) Federico Delbonis	2	3

==== Second qualifier ====
First round
2	(United States) Steve Johnson	6^{5}	3
WC	(France) Lucas Pouille	7^{7}	6
(Russia) Andrey Kuznetsov	4	4
9	(Finland) Jarkko Nieminen	6	6

Qualifying competition
WC	(France) Lucas Pouille	6	7
9	(Finland) Jarkko Nieminen	2	5

==== Third qualifier ====
First round
3	(United States) Jack Sock	3	6	7^{8}
(Spain) Albert Ramos	6	3	6^{6}
WC	(France) Vincent Millot	3	4
8	(Australia) Bernard Tomic	6	6

Qualifying competition
3	(United States) Jack Sock	6	6
8	(Australia) Bernard Tomic	2	4

==== Fourth qualifier ====
First round
4	(Germany) Jan-Lennard Struff	6^{1}	4
(United States) Donald Young	7^{7}	6
(Netherlands) Igor Sijsling	6	7^{7}
12	(Russia) Teymuraz Gabashvili	4	6^{4}

Qualifying competition
(United States) Donald Young	7	6
(Netherlands) Igor Sijsling	5	3

==== Fifth qualifier ====
First round
5	(Luxembourg) Gilles Müller	6	6
(Kazakhstan) Andrey Golubev	3	4
Alt	(France) Nicolas Mahut	6^{4}	4
7	(Uzbekistan) Denis Istomin	7^{7}	6

Qualifying competition
5	(Luxembourg) Gilles Müller	6^{5}	4
7	(Uzbekistan) Denis Istomin	7	6

==== Sixth qualifier ====
First round
6	(Italy) Andreas Seppi	2	7^{8}	1
WC	(France) Kenny de Schepper	6	6^{6}	6
(Italy) Paolo Lorenzi	6	6^{5}	3
10	(Ukraine) Sergiy Stakhovsky	3	7^{7}	6

Qualifying competition
WC	(France) Kenny de Schepper	6^{4}	7^{7}	7
10	(Ukraine) Sergiy Stakhovsky	7^{7}	6^{4}	5
