= 2015 BNP Paribas Masters – Singles =

Singles
- 2015 BNP Paribas Masters

Final
- Champion: (Serbia) Novak Djokovic
- Runner-up: (United Kingdom) Andy Murray
- Score: 6–2, 6–4

Details
- Draw: 48 (6 Q / 3 WC)
- Seeds: 16

Events
Singles	Doubles
← 2014 ·	BNP Paribas Masters	· 2016 →

Two-time defending champion Novak Djokovic defeated Andy Murray in the final, 6–2, 6–4 to win the singles tennis title at the 2015 Paris Masters. It was his record fourth Paris Masters title. With the win, Djokovic became the first man to win six Masters 1000 titles in the same year.

== Seeds ==
All seeds receive a bye into the second round.

1. (Serbia) Novak Djokovic (champion)
2. (United Kingdom) Andy Murray (final)
3. (Switzerland) Roger Federer (third round)
4. (Switzerland) Stan Wawrinka (semifinals)
5. (Czech Republic) Tomáš Berdych (quarterfinals)
6. (Japan) Kei Nishikori (third round, retired due to a back injury)
7. (Spain) Rafael Nadal (quarterfinals)
8. (Spain) David Ferrer (semifinals)

9. (France) Jo-Wilfried Tsonga (third round)
10. (France) Richard Gasquet (quarterfinals)
11. (South Africa) Kevin Anderson (third round)
12. (Croatia) Marin Čilić (second round)
13. (United States) John Isner (quarterfinals)
14. (France) Gilles Simon (third round)
15. (Spain) Feliciano López (second round)
16. (Belgium) David Goffin (third round)

Click on the seed number of a player to go to their draw section.

== Draw ==
=== Key ===
- Q = Qualifier
- WC = Wild card
- LL = Lucky loser
- Alt = Alternate
- SE = Special exempt
- PR = Protected ranking
- ITF = ITF entry
- JE = Junior exempt
- w/o = Walkover
- r = Retired
- d = Defaulted
- SR = Special ranking

=== Finals ===
Quarterfinals
1	(Serbia) Novak Djokovic	7^{7}	7^{10}
5	(Czech Republic) Tomáš Berdych	6^{3}	6^{8}
4	(Switzerland) Stan Wawrinka	7^{10}	7^{9}
7	(Spain) Rafael Nadal	6^{8}	6^{7}
8	(Spain) David Ferrer	6	6^{6}	6
13	(United States) John Isner	3	7^{8}	2
10	(France) Richard Gasquet	6^{7}	6	3
2	(United Kingdom) Andy Murray	7^{9}	3	6

Semifinals
1	(Serbia) Novak Djokovic	6	3	6
4	(Switzerland) Stan Wawrinka	3	6	0
8	(Spain) David Ferrer	4	3
2	(United Kingdom) Andy Murray	6	6

Final
1	(Serbia) Novak Djokovic	6	6
2	(United Kingdom) Andy Murray	2	4

=== Top half ===
==== Section 1 ====
First round
LL	(Russia) T Gabashvili	4	4
(Brazil) T Bellucci	6	6
(France) B Paire	2	7^{9}	6
(France) G Monfils	6	6^{7}	4
WC	(France) P-H Herbert	6	3	2
(Spain) R Bautista Agut	4	6	6
Q	(France) É Roger-Vasselin	4	7^{7}	7^{7}
(Croatia) I Karlović	6	6^{1}	6^{5}

Second round
1	(Serbia) N Djokovic	7	6
(Brazil) T Bellucci	5	3
(France) B Paire	4	6	1
14	(France) G Simon	6	4	6
9	(France) J-W Tsonga	6	6
(Spain) R Bautista Agut	2	2
Q	(France) É Roger-Vasselin	3	6	5
5	(Czech Republic) T Berdych	6	4	7

Third round
1	(Serbia) N Djokovic	6	7
14	(France) G Simon	3	5
9	(France) J-W Tsonga	3	4
5	(Czech Republic) T Berdych	6	6

Quarterfinals
1	(Serbia) N Djokovic	7^{7}	7^{10}
5	(Czech Republic) T Berdych	6^{3}	6^{8}

==== Section 2 ====
First round
(Italy) F Fognini	3	2
(Australia) B Tomic	6	6
(United States) J Sock	2	3
(Serbia) V Troicki	6	6
(Austria) D Thiem	6	5	6
(France) A Mannarino	2	7	2
Q	(Czech Republic) L Rosol	6	2	6
(Spain) G García López	2	6	3

Second round
4	(Switzerland) S Wawrinka	6	7^{8}
(Australia) B Tomic	3	6^{6}
(Serbia) V Troicki	6^{7}	7	6
15	(Spain) F López	7^{9}	5	4
11	(South Africa) K Anderson	6^{3}	7^{7}	7^{7}
(Austria) D Thiem	7^{7}	6^{4}	6^{5}
Q	(Czech Republic) L Rosol	2	2
7	(Spain) R Nadal	6	6

Third round
4	(Switzerland) S Wawrinka	6	7
(Serbia) V Troicki	4	5
11	(South Africa) K Anderson	6	6^{6}	2
7	(Spain) R Nadal	4	7^{8}	6

Quarterfinals
4	(Switzerland) S Wawrinka	7^{10}	7^{9}
7	(Spain) R Nadal	6^{8}	6^{7}

=== Bottom half ===
==== Section 3 ====
First round
(Czech Republic) J Veselý	3	6^{6}
(Ukraine) A Dolgopolov	6	7^{8}
Q	(Spain) P Carreño	4	1
(Bulgaria) G Dimitrov	6	6
Q	(Spain) M Granollers	5	6^{4}
Q	(United Kingdom) A Bedene	7	7^{7}
(Italy) A Seppi	7	6
(Uruguay) P Cuevas	5	3

Second round
8	(Spain) D Ferrer	6	6
(Ukraine) A Dolgopolov	2	2
(Bulgaria) G Dimitrov	7^{7}	7^{7}
12	(Croatia) M Čilić	6^{3}	6^{2}
13	(United States) J Isner	6	7^{7}
Q	(United Kingdom) A Bedene	3	6^{3}
(Italy) A Seppi	1	1
3	(Switzerland) R Federer	6	6

Third round
8	(Spain) D Ferrer	6^{4}	6	6
(Bulgaria) G Dimitrov	7^{7}	1	4
13	(United States) J Isner	7^{7}	3	7^{7}
3	(Switzerland) R Federer	6^{3}	6	6^{5}

Quarterfinals
8	(Spain) D Ferrer	6	6^{6}	6
13	(United States) J Isner	3	7^{8}	2

==== Section 4 ====
First round
WC	(France) L Pouille	6	3	2
(France) J Chardy	3	6	6
(Argentina) L Mayer	6	6
(Slovakia) M Kližan	4	3
WC	(France) N Mahut	5	3
Q	(Serbia) D Lajović	7	6
(Spain) F Verdasco	4	4
(Croatia) B Ćorić	6	6

Second round
6	(Japan) K Nishikori	7^{7}	6^{6}	6
(France) J Chardy	6^{4}	7^{8}	1
(Argentina) L Mayer	2	5
10	(France) R Gasquet	6	7
16	(Belgium) D Goffin	6	6
Q	(Serbia) D Lajović	2	2
(Croatia) B Ćorić	1	2
2	(United Kingdom) A Murray	6	6

Third round
6	(Japan) K Nishikori	6^{3}	1^{r}
10	(France) R Gasquet	7^{7}	4
16	(Belgium) D Goffin	1	0
2	(United Kingdom) A Murray	6	6

Quarterfinals
10	(France) R Gasquet	6^{7}	6	3
2	(United Kingdom) A Murray	7^{9}	3	6

== Qualifying ==
=== Seeds ===
1. (United Kingdom) Aljaž Bedene (qualified)
2. (United States) Donald Young (first round)
3. (Russia) Teymuraz Gabashvili (qualifying competition, lucky loser)
4. (Argentina) Federico Delbonis (first round)
5. (Netherlands) Robin Haase (first round)
6. (Spain) Albert Ramos (first round)
7. (Poland) Jerzy Janowicz (qualifying competition)
8. (Ukraine) Sergiy Stakhovsky (first round)
9. (Czech Republic) Lukáš Rosol (qualified)
10. (Spain) Pablo Carreño (qualified)
11. (Spain) Marcel Granollers (qualified)
12. (Spain) Daniel Gimeno Traver (first round)

=== Qualifiers ===
1. (United Kingdom) Aljaž Bedene
2. (Spain) Marcel Granollers
3. (Czech Republic) Lukáš Rosol
4. (Spain) Pablo Carreño
5. (France) Édouard Roger-Vasselin
6. (Serbia) Dušan Lajović

=== Lucky losers ===
1. (Russia) Teymuraz Gabashvili

=== Qualifying draw ===
==== First qualifier ====
First round
1	(United Kingdom) Aljaž Bedene	7^{7}	7^{7}
WC	(France) Grégoire Barrère	6^{2}	6^{5}
(Croatia) Ivan Dodig	5	6	3
7	(Poland) Jerzy Janowicz	7	3	6

Qualifying competition
1	(United Kingdom) Aljaž Bedene	6^{3}	6	7
7	(Poland) Jerzy Janowicz	7^{7}	2	5

==== Second qualifier ====
First round
2	(United States) Donald Young	4	0^{r}
(France) Kenny de Schepper	6	2
WC	(France) Quentin Halys	4	4
11	(Spain) Marcel Granollers	6	6

Qualifying competition
(France) Kenny de Schepper	4	4
11	(Spain) Marcel Granollers	6	6

==== Third qualifier ====
First round
3	(Russia) Teymuraz Gabashvili	6	6
(Spain) Íñigo Cervantes	3	3
(Moldova) Radu Albot	3	3
9	(Czech Republic) Lukáš Rosol	6	6

Qualifying competition
3	(Russia) Teymuraz Gabashvili	6	3	6^{7}
9	(Czech Republic) Lukáš Rosol	3	6	7^{9}

==== Fourth qualifier ====
First round
4	(Argentina) Federico Delbonis	6^{5}	6	5
(United States) Rajeev Ram	7^{7}	3	7
(Germany) Michael Berrer	2	5
10	(Spain) Pablo Carreño	6	7

Qualifying competition
(United States) Rajeev Ram	4	0
10	(Spain) Pablo Carreño	6	6

==== Fifth qualifier ====
First round
5	(Netherlands) Robin Haase	3	4
(Germany) Jan-Lennard Struff	6	6
WC	(France) Édouard Roger-Vasselin	4	6	6
8	(Ukraine) Sergiy Stakhovsky	6	4	3

Qualifying competition
(Germany) Jan-Lennard Struff	7^{7}	2	1
WC	(France) Édouard Roger-Vasselin	6^{5}	6	6

==== Sixth qualifier ====
First round
6	(Spain) Albert Ramos	3	2
WC	(France) Paul-Henri Mathieu	6	6
(Serbia) Dušan Lajović	7^{7}	2	6
12	(Spain) Daniel Gimeno Traver	6^{2}	6	2

Qualifying competition
WC	(France) Paul-Henri Mathieu	3	3
(Serbia) Dušan Lajović	6	6
