= Alexander Peya =

Austrian tennis player (born 1980)

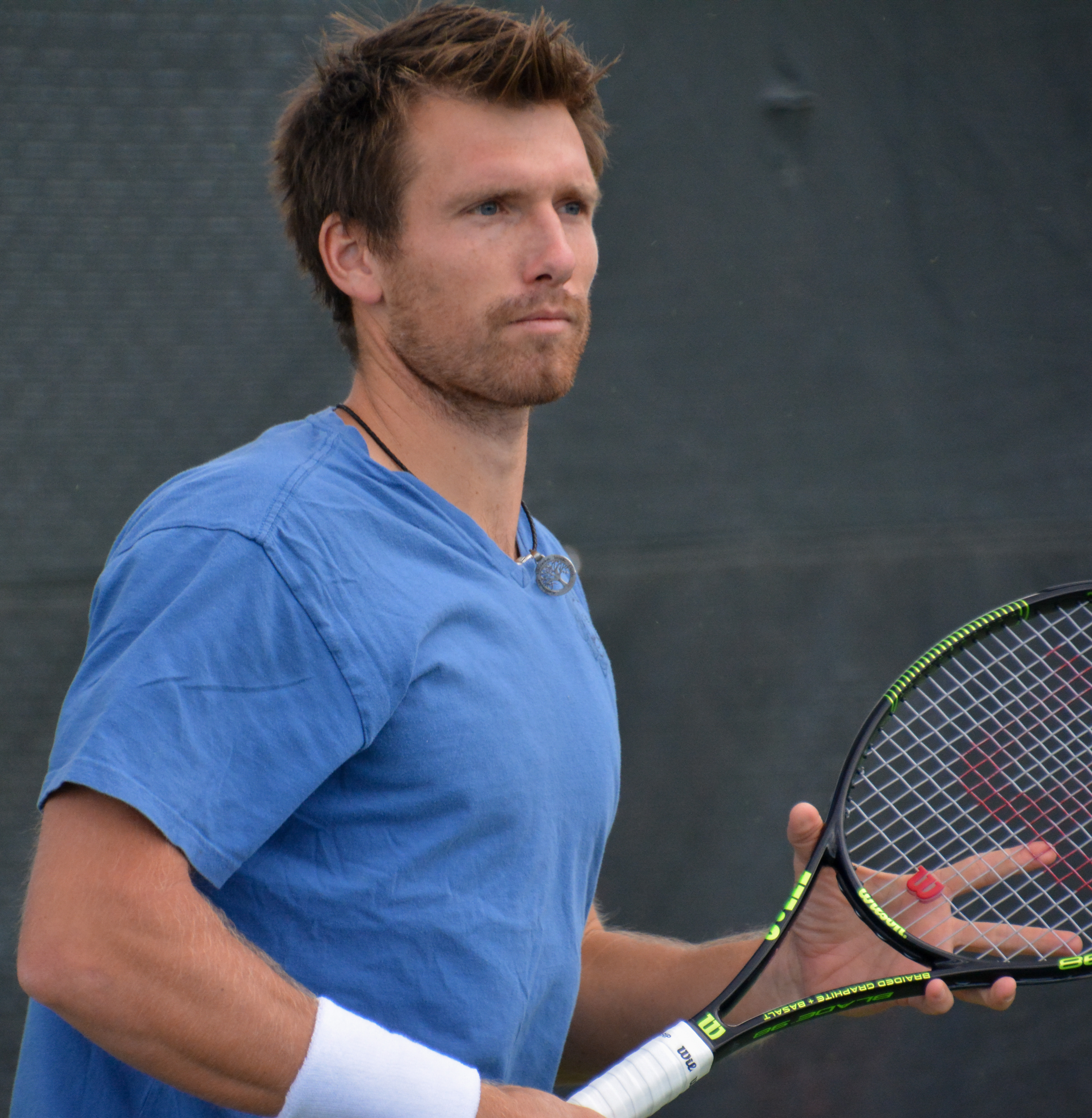
- Country (sports): Austria
- Born: 27 June 1980 (age 46) Vienna, Austria
- Height: 1.83 m (6 ft 0 in)
- Turned pro: 1998
- Retired: 2019
- Plays: Right-handed (one-handed backhand)
- Coach: Michael Oberleitner, Martin Gattringer
- Prize money: US $4,428,635

Singles
- Career record: 22–51
- Career titles: 0
- Highest ranking: No. 92 (April 30, 2007)

Grand Slam singles results
- Australian Open: Q3 (2004)
- French Open: 1R (2004, 2007)
- Wimbledon: 2R (2004)
- US Open: 3R (2004)

Doubles
- Career record: 368–266
- Career titles: 17
- Highest ranking: No. 3 (12 August 2013)

Grand Slam doubles results
- Australian Open: 3R (2014)
- French Open: SF (2013, 2016, 2018)
- Wimbledon: SF (2011)
- US Open: F (2013)

Other doubles tournaments
- Tour Finals: SF (2013)
- Olympic Games: QF (2016)

Mixed doubles
- Career titles: 1

Grand Slam mixed doubles results
- Australian Open: QF (2015)
- French Open: QF (2015, 2018)
- Wimbledon: W (2018)
- US Open: 2R (2014)

Alexander Peya (born 27 June 1980) is an Austrian tennis coach and a former professional player. His career-high doubles ranking was World No. 3, first achieved in August 2013. He also reached a career-high singles ranking of No. 92 in April 2007. Peya won the 2018 Wimbledon mixed doubles title alongside Nicole Melichar-Martinez, defeating Jamie Murray and Victoria Azarenka in the final.

== Significant finals ==
=== Grand Slam finals ===
==== Doubles: 1 (1 runner-up) ====
Result	Year	Championship	Surface	Partner	Opponents	Score
Loss	2013	US Open	Hard	(Brazil) Bruno Soares	(India) Leander Paes (Czech Republic) Radek Štěpánek	1–6, 3–6

==== Mixed Doubles: 2 (1 title, 1 runner-up) ====
Result	Year	Championship	Surface	Partner	Opponents	Score
Loss	2015	Wimbledon	Grass	(Hungary) Tímea Babos	(India) Leander Paes (Switzerland) Martina Hingis	1–6, 1–6
Win	2018	Wimbledon	Grass	(United States) Nicole Melichar	(United Kingdom) Jamie Murray (Belarus) Victoria Azarenka	7–6^{(7–1)}, 6–3

=== Masters 1000 finals ===
==== Doubles: 6 (3 titles, 3 runners-up) ====
Result	Year	Tournament	Surface	Partner	Opponents	Score
Loss	2013	Madrid Open	Clay	(Brazil) Bruno Soares	(United States) Bob Bryan (United States) Mike Bryan	2–6, 3–6
Win	2013	Canadian Open	Hard	(Brazil) Bruno Soares	(United Kingdom) Andy Murray (United Kingdom) Colin Fleming	6–4, 7–6^{(7–4)}
Loss	2013	Paris Masters	Hard (i)	(Brazil) Bruno Soares	(United States) Bob Bryan (United States) Mike Bryan	3–6, 3–6
Loss	2014	Indian Wells Masters	Hard	(Brazil) Bruno Soares	(United States) Bob Bryan (United States) Mike Bryan	4–6, 3–6
Win	2014	Canadian Open	Hard	(Brazil) Bruno Soares	(Croatia) Ivan Dodig (Brazil) Marcelo Melo	6–4, 6–3
Win	2018	Madrid Open	Clay	(Croatia) Nikola Mektić	(United States) Bob Bryan (United States) Mike Bryan	5–3, ret.

== ATP career finals ==
=== Doubles: 46 (17 titles, 29 runner-ups) ===
Legend Grand Slam tournaments (0–1) Tennis Masters Cup / ATP World Tour Finals (0–0) ATP Masters Series / ATP World Tour Masters 1000 (3–3) ATP International Series Gold / ATP World Tour 500 Series (6–9) ATP International Series / ATP World Tour 250 Series (8–16)	Titles by surface Hard (9–15) Clay (6–11) Grass (2–4) Carpet (0–0)	Titles by setting Outdoor (12–24) Indoor (5–5)

Result	W–L	Date	Tournament	Tier	Surface	Partner	Opponents	Score
Loss	0–1	Jul 2003	Austrian Open, Austria	Intl. Gold	Clay	(Austria) Jürgen Melzer	(Czech Republic) Martin Damm (Czech Republic) Cyril Suk	4–6, 4–6
Loss	0–2	May 2006	Bavarian Championships, Germany	International	Clay	(Germany) Björn Phau	(Romania) Andrei Pavel (Germany) Alexander Waske	4–6, 2–6
Loss	0–3	Oct 2008	Vienna Open, Austria	Intl. Gold	Hard (i)	(Germany) Philipp Petzschner	(Belarus) Max Mirnyi (Israel) Andy Ram	1–6, 5–7
Loss	0–4	Feb 2011	Delray Beach Open, US	250 Series	Hard	(Germany) Christopher Kas	(United States) Scott Lipsky (United States) Rajeev Ram	6–4, 4–6, [3–10]
Loss	0–5	Apr 2011	Serbia Open, Serbia	250 Series	Clay	(Austria) Oliver Marach	(Czech Republic) František Čermák (Slovakia) Filip Polášek	5–7, 2–6
Win	1–5	Jul 2011	German Open, Germany	500 Series	Clay	(Austria) Oliver Marach	(Czech Republic) František Čermák (Slovakia) Filip Polášek	6–4, 6–1
Loss	1–6	Jul 2011	Swiss Open, Switzerland	250 Series	Clay	(Germany) Christopher Kas	(Czech Republic) František Čermák (Slovakia) Filip Polášek	3–6, 6–7^{(7–9)}
Loss	1–7	Aug 2011	Winston-Salem Open, US	250 Series	Hard	(Germany) Christopher Kas	(Israel) Jonathan Erlich (Israel) Andy Ram	6–7^{(2–7)}, 4–6
Win	2–7	Jan 2012	Auckland Open, New Zealand	250 Series	Hard	(Austria) Oliver Marach	(Czech Republic) František Čermák (Slovakia) Filip Polášek	6–3, 6–2
Loss	2–8	Jul 2012	Swedish Open, Sweden	250 Series	Clay	(Brazil) Bruno Soares	(Sweden) Robert Lindstedt (Romania) Horia Tecău	3–6, 6–7^{(5–7)}
Win	3–8	Sep 2012	Malaysian Open, Malaysia	250 Series	Hard (i)	(Brazil) Bruno Soares	(United Kingdom) Colin Fleming (United Kingdom) Ross Hutchins	5–7, 7–5, [10–7]
Win	4–8	Oct 2012	Japan Open, Japan	500 Series	Hard	(Brazil) Bruno Soares	(India) Leander Paes (Czech Republic) Radek Štěpánek	6–3, 7–6^{(7–5)}
Win	5–8	Oct 2012	Valencia Open, Spain	500 Series	Hard (i)	(Brazil) Bruno Soares	(Spain) David Marrero (Spain) Fernando Verdasco	6–3, 6–2
Win	6–8	Feb 2013	Brasil Open, Brazil	250 Series	Clay (i)	(Brazil) Bruno Soares	(Czech Republic) František Čermák (Slovakia) Michal Mertiňák	6–7^{(5–7)}, 6–2, [10–7]
Win	7–8	Apr 2013	Barcelona Open, Spain	500 Series	Clay	(Brazil) Bruno Soares	(Sweden) Robert Lindstedt (Canada) Daniel Nestor	5–7, 7–6^{(9–7)}, [10–4]
Loss	7–9	May 2013	Madrid Open, Spain	Masters 1000	Clay	(Brazil) Bruno Soares	(United States) Bob Bryan (United States) Mike Bryan	2–6, 3–6
Loss	7–10	Jun 2013	Queen's Club Championships, United Kingdom	250 Series	Grass	(Brazil) Bruno Soares	(United States) Bob Bryan (United States) Mike Bryan	6–4, 5–7, [3–10]
Win	8–10	Jun 2013	Eastbourne International, United Kingdom	250 Series	Grass	(Brazil) Bruno Soares	(United Kingdom) Colin Fleming (United Kingdom) Jonathan Marray	3–6, 6–3, [10–8]
Loss	8–11	Jul 2013	German Open, Germany	500 Series	Clay	(Brazil) Bruno Soares	(Poland) Mariusz Fyrstenberg (Poland) Marcin Matkowski	6–3, 1–6, [8–10]
Win	9–11	Aug 2013	Canadian Open, Canada	Masters 1000	Hard	(Brazil) Bruno Soares	(United Kingdom) Colin Fleming (United Kingdom) Andy Murray	6–4, 7–6^{(7–4)}
Loss	9–12	Sep 2013	US Open, United States	Grand Slam	Hard	(Brazil) Bruno Soares	(India) Leander Paes (Czech Republic) Radek Štěpánek	1–6, 3–6
Win	10–12	Oct 2013	Valencia Open, Spain (2)	500 Series	Hard (i)	(Brazil) Bruno Soares	(United States) Bob Bryan (United States) Mike Bryan	7–6^{(7–3)}, 6–7^{(1–7)}, [13–11]
Loss	10–13	Nov 2013	Paris Masters, France	Masters 1000	Hard (i)	(Brazil) Bruno Soares	(United States) Bob Bryan (United States) Mike Bryan	3–6, 3–6
Loss	10–14	Jan 2014	Qatar Open, Qatar	250 Series	Hard	(Brazil) Bruno Soares	(Czech Republic) Tomáš Berdych (Czech Republic) Jan Hájek	2–6, 4–6
Loss	10–15	Jan 2014	Auckland Open, New Zealand	250 Series	Hard	(Brazil) Bruno Soares	(Austria) Julian Knowle (Brazil) Marcelo Melo	6–4, 3–6, [5–10]
Loss	10–16	Mar 2014	Indian Wells Masters, United States	Masters 1000	Hard	(Brazil) Bruno Soares	(United States) Bob Bryan (United States) Mike Bryan	4–6, 3–6
Win	11–16	Jun 2014	Queen's Club Championships, United Kingdom	250 Series	Grass	(Brazil) Bruno Soares	(United Kingdom) Jamie Murray (Australia) John Peers	4–6, 7–6^{(7–4)}, [10–4]
Loss	11–17	Jun 2014	Eastbourne International, United Kingdom	250 Series	Grass	(Brazil) Bruno Soares	(Philippines) Treat Huey (United Kingdom) Dominic Inglot	5–7, 7–5, [8–10]
Loss	11–18	Jul 2014	German Open, Germany	500 Series	Clay	(Brazil) Bruno Soares	(Croatia) Marin Draganja (Romania) Florin Mergea	4–6, 5–7
Win	12–18	Aug 2014	Canadian Open, Canada (2)	Masters 1000	Hard	(Brazil) Bruno Soares	(Croatia) Ivan Dodig (Brazil) Marcelo Melo	6–4, 6–3
Win	13–18	May 2015	Bavarian Championships, Germany	250 Series	Clay	(Brazil) Bruno Soares	(Germany) Alexander Zverev (Germany) Mischa Zverev	4–6, 6–1, [10–5]
Loss	13–19	Jun 2015	Stuttgart Open, Germany	250 Series	Grass	(Brazil) Bruno Soares	(India) Rohan Bopanna (Romania) Florin Mergea	5–7, 6–2, [10–7]
Loss	13–20	Sep 2015	St. Petersburg Open, Russia	250 Series	Hard (i)	(Austria) Julian Knowle	(Philippines) Treat Huey (Finland) Henri Kontinen	5–7, 3–6
Win	14–20	Nov 2015	Swiss Indoors, Switzerland	500 Series	Hard (i)	(Brazil) Bruno Soares	(United Kingdom) Jamie Murray (Australia) John Peers	7–5, 7–5
Loss	14–21	Jan 2016	Qatar Open, Qatar	250 Series	Hard	(Germany) Philipp Petzschner	(Spain) Feliciano López (Spain) Marc López	4–6, 3–6
Loss	14–22	Feb 2016	Rotterdam Open, Netherlands	500 Series	Hard (i)	(Germany) Philipp Petzschner	(France) Nicolas Mahut (Canada) Vasek Pospisil	6–7^{(2–7)}, 4–6
Loss	14–23	Feb 2016	Mexican Open, Mexico	500 Series	Hard	(Germany) Philipp Petzschner	(Philippines) Treat Huey (Belarus) Max Mirnyi	6–7^{(5–7)}, 3–6
Loss	14–24	Jun 2016	Halle Open, Germany	500 Series	Grass	(Poland) Łukasz Kubot	(South Africa) Raven Klaasen (United States) Rajeev Ram	6–7^{(5–7)}, 2–6
Loss	14–25	Jul 2016	Washington Open, United States	500 Series	Hard	(Poland) Łukasz Kubot	(Canada) Daniel Nestor (France) Édouard Roger-Vasselin	6–7^{(3–7)}, 6–7^{(4–7)}
Loss	14–26	Apr 2017	Barcelona Open, Spain	500 Series	Clay	(Germany) Philipp Petzschner	(Romania) Florin Mergea (Pakistan) Aisam-ul-Haq Qureshi	4–6, 3–6
Win	15–26	Sep 2017	Shenzhen Open, China	250 Series	Hard	(United States) Rajeev Ram	(Croatia) Nikola Mektić (United States) Nicholas Monroe	6–3, 6–2
Loss	15–27	Feb 2018	Sofia Open, Bulgaria	250 Series	Hard (i)	(Croatia) Nikola Mektić	(Netherlands) Robin Haase (Netherlands) Matwé Middelkoop	7–5, 4–6, [4–10]
Loss	15–28	Feb 2018	Rio Open, Brazil	500 Series	Clay	(Croatia) Nikola Mektić	(Spain) David Marrero (Spain) Fernando Verdasco	7–5, 5–7, [8–10]
Win	16–28	Apr 2018	Grand Prix Hassan II, Morocco	250 Series	Clay	(Croatia) Nikola Mektić	(France) Benoît Paire (France) Édouard Roger-Vasselin	7–5, 3–6, [10–7]
Loss	16–29	May 2018	Bavarian Championships, Germany	250 Series	Clay	(Croatia) Nikola Mektić	(Croatia) Ivan Dodig (United States) Rajeev Ram	3–6, 5–7
Win	17–29	May 2018	Madrid Open, Spain	Masters 1000	Clay	(Croatia) Nikola Mektić	(United States) Bob Bryan (United States) Mike Bryan	5–3, ret.

== Performance timelines ==
Key
W	F	SF	QF	#R	RR	Q#	P#	DNQ	A	Z#	PO	G	S	B	NMS	NTI	P	NH

(W) winner; (F) finalist; (SF) semifinalist; (QF) quarterfinalist; (#R) rounds 4, 3, 2, 1; (RR) round-robin stage; (Q#) qualification round; (P#) preliminary round; (DNQ) did not qualify; (A) absent; (Z#) Davis/Fed Cup Zonal Group (with number indication) or (PO) play-off; (G) gold, (S) silver or (B) bronze Olympic/Paralympic medal; (NMS) not a Masters tournament; (NTI) not a Tier I tournament; (P) postponed; (NH) not held; (SR) strike rate (events won / competed); (W–L) win–loss record.
To avoid confusion and double counting, these charts are updated at the conclusion of a tournament or when the player's participation has ended.

=== Singles ===
Tournament	2002	2003	2004	2005	2006	2007	2008	2009	2010	2011	W–L
Grand Slam tournaments
Australian Open	Q1	A	Q3	A	A	Q2	Q2	Q1	A	Q1	0–0
French Open	Q1	Q2	1R	Q1	A	1R	Q1	A	A	A	0–2
Wimbledon	Q1	Q3	2R	Q1	1R	1R	1R	1R	Q3	A	1–5
US Open	Q2	A	3R	Q3	Q3	Q3	Q1	Q3	Q1	A	2–1
Win–loss	0–0	0–0	3–3	0–0	0–1	0–2	0–1	0–1	0–0	0–0	3–8

=== Doubles ===
Tournament	1999	2000	2001	2002	2003	2004	2005	2006	2007	2008	2009	2010	2011	2012	2013	2014	2015	2016	2017	2018	2019	SR	W–L
Grand Slam tournaments
Australian Open	A	A	A	A	A	A	A	A	1R	2R	2R	A	1R	1R	2R	3R	2R	1R	1R	2R	A	0 / 11	7–11
French Open	A	A	A	A	A	3R	A	QF	1R	1R	1R	A	3R	2R	SF	2R	QF	SF	1R	SF	A	0 / 13	23–13
Wimbledon	A	A	A	Q1	A	Q1	2R	2R	3R	QF	2R	Q2	SF	1R	3R	QF	QF	1R	2R	3R	A	0 / 13	23–13
US Open	A	A	A	A	A	2R	A	2R	1R	1R	1R	A	1R	QF	F	QF	1R	QF	1R	A	A	0 / 12	15–12
Win–loss	0–0	0–0	0–0	0–0	0–0	3–2	1–1	4–3	2–4	4–4	2–4	0–0	6–4	4–4	12–4	9–4	7–4	6–4	1–4	7–3	0–0	0 / 49	68–49
Year-end championship
ATP Finals	Did not qualify														SF	RR	Did not qualify			RR	DNQ	0 / 3	3–6
ATP World Tour Masters 1000
Indian Wells Masters	A	A	A	A	A	A	A	A	A	A	A	A	A	1R	SF	F	1R	A	1R	1R	A	0 / 6	8–6
Miami Open	A	A	A	A	A	A	A	A	A	A	A	A	A	2R	1R	QF	A	QF	QF	QF	A	0 / 6	9–6
Monte-Carlo Masters	A	A	A	A	A	A	A	A	A	A	A	A	A	QF	2R	QF	QF	2R	1R	A	A	0 / 6	5–6
Madrid Open	Not Held			A	A	A	A	A	A	A	A	A	A	1R	F	QF	1R	QF	1R	W	A	1 / 7	10–6
Italian Open	A	A	A	A	A	A	A	A	A	A	A	A	A	2R	2R	2R	2R	2R	A	1R	A	0 / 6	0–6
Canadian Open	A	A	A	A	A	A	A	A	A	A	A	A	A	A	W	W	SF	1R	A	SF	A	2 / 5	13–3
Cincinnati Masters	A	A	A	A	A	A	A	A	A	A	A	A	A	A	QF	QF	2R	1R	A	QF	A	0 / 5	5–4
Shanghai Masters	Not Held										A	A	2R	2R	A	QF	1R	A	A	A	A	0 / 4	2–4
Paris Masters	A	A	A	A	A	A	A	A	A	A	A	A	QF	QF	F	2R	2R	A	A	A	A	0 / 5	6–5
Win–loss	0–0	0–0	0–0	0–0	0–0	0–0	0–0	0–0	0–0	0–0	0–0	0–0	2–2	5–7	14–7	14–8	5–8	4–6	2–4	12–4	0–0	3 / 50	58–46
National representation
Olympics	NH	A	Not Held			A	Not Held			A	Not Held			2R	Not Held			QF	Not Held			0 / 2	3–2
Davis Cup	PO	1R	A	Z1	PO	PO	1R	1R	1R	PO	1R	PO	PO	QF	1R	Z1	Z1	Z1	A	A	A	0 / 7	7–10
Win–loss	0–1	0–1	0–0	0–1	2–1	1–0	0–0	0–0	0–0	0–0	0–1	0–1	1–0	2–2	1–0	0–2	0–1	3–1	0–0	0–0	0–0	0 / 9	10–12
Career statistics
	1999	2000	2001	2002	2003	2004	2005	2006	2007	2008	2009	2010	2011	2012	2013	2014	2015	2016	2017	2018	2019	Career	
Titles	0	0	0	0	0	0	0	0	0	0	0	0	1	4	5	2	2	0	1	2	0	17	
Finals	0	0	0	0	1	0	0	1	0	1	0	0	5	5	10	7	4	5	2	5	0	46	
Overall win–loss	3–2	0–2	1–2	0–3	6–3	6–6	1–2	7–9	11–14	14–12	14–16	2–3	36–23	36–24	56–20	43–27	38–27	35–25	22–24	36–20	1–2	368–266	
Year-end ranking	208	455	294	197	90	95	98	52	62	49	73	103	18	22	4	10	24	23	54	17	711	58%	
