= 2012 BNP Paribas Masters – Singles =

Singles
- 2012 BNP Paribas Masters

Final
- Champion: (Spain) David Ferrer
- Runner-up: (Poland) Jerzy Janowicz
- Score: 6–4, 6–3

Details
- Draw: 48 (6 Q / 3 WC)
- Seeds: 16

Events
Singles	Doubles
- BNP Paribas Masters

David Ferrer defeated Jerzy Janowicz in the final, 6–4, 6–3 to win the singles tennis title at the 2012 Paris Masters. It was the first and only Masters 1000 title of his career out of seven finals, and he became the first Spaniard to win the Paris Masters.

Roger Federer was the reigning champion, but withdrew due to fatigue. As a result, Novak Djokovic regained the world No. 1 ranking following the tournament, despite losing in the second round.

== Seeds ==
All seeds receive a bye into the second round.

1. (Switzerland) ~~Roger Federer~~ (withdrew because of fatigue)
2. (Serbia) Novak Djokovic (second round)
3. (United Kingdom) Andy Murray (third round)
4. (Spain) David Ferrer (champion)
5. (Czech Republic) Tomáš Berdych (quarterfinals)
6. (France) Jo-Wilfried Tsonga (quarterfinals)
7. (Argentina) Juan Martín del Potro (third round)
8. (Serbia) Janko Tipsarević (quarterfinals, retired because of illness)
9. (Argentina) Juan Mónaco (third round)
10. (United States) John Isner (second round)
11. (Spain) Nicolás Almagro (third round)
12. (France) Richard Gasquet (second round)
13. (Croatia) Marin Čilić (second round)
14. (Canada) Milos Raonic (third round)
15. (Japan) Kei Nishikori (third round, withdrew because of a right ankle injury)
16. (Switzerland) Stanislas Wawrinka (third round)

== Draw ==
Key

- Q = Qualifier
- WC = Wild card
- LL = Lucky loser
- Alt = Alternate
- ITF = ITF entry
- PR = Protected ranking
- SR = Special ranking
- SE = Special exempt
- JE = Junior exempt
- JR = Junior Accelerator Programme entrant
- CO = College Accelerator Programme entrant
- NG = Next Gen Accelerator Program entrant
- w/o = Walkover
- r = Retired
- d = Defaulted

=== Finals ===
Quarterfinals
(France) Gilles Simon	6	6
5	(Czech Republic) Tomáš Berdych	4	4
Q	(Poland) Jerzy Janowicz	3	6	4
8	(Serbia) Janko Tipsarević	6	1	1^{r}
6	(France) Jo-Wilfried Tsonga	2	5
4	(Spain) David Ferrer	6	7
WC	(France) Michaël Llodra	7^{7}	6
(United States) Sam Querrey	6^{4}	3

Semifinals
(France) Gilles Simon	4	5
Q	(Poland) Jerzy Janowicz	6	7
4	(Spain) David Ferrer	7	6
WC	(France) Michaël Llodra	5	3

Final
Q	(Poland) Jerzy Janowicz	4	3
4	(Spain) David Ferrer	6	6

=== Top half ===
==== Section 1 ====
First round
(Cyprus) M Baghdatis	5	1
(France) G Simon	7	6
(Spain) P Andújar	3	4
WC	(France) B Paire	6	6
(South Africa) K Anderson	6	6
(Brazil) T Bellucci	2	1
(Slovakia) M Kližan	2	6	6^{5}
(Italy) A Seppi	6	2	7^{7}

Second round
LL	(Romania) V Hănescu	5	3
(France) G Simon	7	6
WC	(France) B Paire	6^{2}	2
15	(Japan) K Nishikori	7^{7}	6
12	(France) R Gasquet	6^{5}	6	1
(South Africa) K Anderson	7^{7}	4	6
(Italy) A Seppi	6^{6}	2
5	(Czech Republic) T Berdych	7^{8}	6

Third round
(France) G Simon	w/o
15	(Japan) K Nishikori
(South Africa) K Anderson	6	3	4
5	(Czech Republic) T Berdych	1	6	6

Quarterfinals
(France) G Simon	6	6
5	(Czech Republic) T Berdych	4	4

==== Section 2 ====
First round
WC	(France) P-H Mathieu	6	7
Q	(Spain) R Bautista Agut	4	5
(Germany) P Kohlschreiber	6^{5}	4
Q	(Poland) J Janowicz	7^{7}	6
(Austria) J Melzer	6^{2}	2
Q	(Bulgaria) G Dimitrov	7^{7}	6
(Ukraine) A Dolgopolov	4	2
Q	(Netherlands) I Sijsling	6	6

Second round
3	(United Kingdom) A Murray	7	6
WC	(France) P-H Mathieu	5	3
Q	(Poland) J Janowicz	7^{8}	6
13	(Croatia) M Čilić	6^{6}	2
9	(Argentina) J Mónaco	7^{7}	6
Q	(Bulgaria) G Dimitrov	6^{4}	2
Q	(Netherlands) I Sijsling	4	6^{0}
8	(Serbia) J Tipsarević	6	7^{7}

Third round
3	(United Kingdom) A Murray	7	6^{4}	2
Q	(Poland) J Janowicz	5	7^{7}	6
9	(Argentina) J Mónaco	3	6	3
8	(Serbia) J Tipsarević	6	3	6

Quarterfinals
Q	(Poland) J Janowicz	3	6	4
8	(Serbia) J Tipsarević	6	1	1^{r}

=== Bottom half ===
==== Section 3 ====
First round
(Serbia) V Troicki	4	5
(France) J Benneteau	6	7
(Spain) A Ramos	7^{7}	6
(Spain) F López	6^{5}	4
(Argentina) C Berlocq	7^{7}	6
(Uzbekistan) D Istomin	6^{2}	2
(Russia) M Youzhny	4	3
(Spain) M Granollers	6	6

Second round
6	(France) J-W Tsonga	6	4	7^{7}
(France) J Benneteau	2	6	6^{2}
(Spain) A Ramos	6^{1}	7^{7}	3
11	(Spain) N Almagro	7^{7}	6^{4}	6
16	(Switzerland) S Wawrinka	6	6
(Argentina) C Berlocq	3	2
(Spain) M Granollers	1	3
4	(Spain) D Ferrer	6	6

Third round
6	(France) J-W Tsonga	7^{7}	7^{7}
11	(Spain) N Almagro	6^{4}	6^{3}
16	(Switzerland) S Wawrinka	2	6	2
4	(Spain) D Ferrer	6	4	6

Quarterfinals
6	(France) J-W Tsonga	2	5
4	(Spain) D Ferrer	6	7

==== Section 4 ====
First round
(Germany) F Mayer	6^{3}	2
Q	(Colombia) A Falla	7^{7}	6
LL	(Spain) D Gimeno Traver	5	3
WC	(France) M Llodra	7	6
(France) J Chardy	6	6
Q	(Spain) G García López	0	3
(Spain) F Verdasco	1	1^{r}
(United States) S Querrey	6	1

Second round
7	(Argentina) JM del Potro	6	6
Q	(Colombia) A Falla	2	2
WC	(France) M Llodra	6	7^{7}
10	(United States) J Isner	4	6^{5}
14	(Canada) M Raonic	6^{4}	7^{7}	6
(France) J Chardy	7^{7}	6^{4}	3
(United States) S Querrey	0	7^{7}	6
2	(Serbia) N Djokovic	6	6^{5}	4

Third round
7	(Argentina) JM del Potro	4	3
WC	(France) M Llodra	6	6
14	(Canada) M Raonic	3	6^{1}
(United States) S Querrey	6	7^{7}

Quarterfinals
WC	(France) M Llodra	7^{7}	6
(United States) S Querrey	6^{4}	3

== Qualifying ==
=== Seeds ===
1. (Italy) Fabio Fognini (first round)
2. (Belgium) David Goffin (first round)
3. (Australia) Marinko Matosevic (first round)
4. (Slovakia) Lukáš Lacko (first round)
5. (Colombia) Alejandro Falla (qualified)
6. (Japan) Go Soeda (first round)
7. (Romania) Victor Hănescu (qualifying competition, lucky loser)
8. (Bulgaria) Grigor Dimitrov (qualified)
9. (Poland) Jerzy Janowicz (qualified)
10. (Spain) Guillermo García López (qualified)
11. (Spain) Daniel Gimeno Traver (qualifying competition, lucky loser)
12. (Poland) Łukasz Kubot (first round)

=== Qualifiers ===
1. (Bulgaria) Grigor Dimitrov
2. (Spain) Guillermo García López
3. (Spain) Roberto Bautista Agut
4. (Netherlands) Igor Sijsling
5. (Colombia) Alejandro Falla
6. (Poland) Jerzy Janowicz

=== Lucky losers ===
1. (Romania) Victor Hănescu
2. (Spain) Daniel Gimeno Traver

=== Draw ===
==== First qualifier ====
First round
1	(Italy) Fabio Fognini	1	7	0
WC	(France) Jonathan Dasnières de Veigy	6	5	6
(Belgium) Steve Darcis	6^{5}	6^{4}
8	(Bulgaria) Grigor Dimitrov	7^{7}	7^{7}

Qualifying competition
WC	(France) Jonathan Dasnières de Veigy	2	6^{2}
8	(Bulgaria) Grigor Dimitrov	6	7^{7}

==== Second qualifier ====
First round
2	(Belgium) David Goffin	4	3
(Lithuania) Ričardas Berankis	6	6
WC	(France) Josselin Ouanna	4	7^{7}	5
10	(Spain) Guillermo García López	6	6^{5}	7

Qualifying competition
(Lithuania) Ričardas Berankis	6^{1}	6^{6}
10	(Spain) Guillermo García López	7^{7}	7^{8}

==== Third qualifier ====
First round
3	(Australia) Marinko Matosevic	3	3
(Spain) Roberto Bautista Agut	6	6
(Australia) Matthew Ebden	5	2
11	(Spain) Daniel Gimeno Traver	7	6

Qualifying competition
(Spain) Roberto Bautista Agut	6	6
11	(Spain) Daniel Gimeno Traver	2	1

==== Fourth qualifier ====
First round
4	(Slovakia) Lukáš Lacko	6	4	4
(Netherlands) Igor Sijsling	3	6	6
(Germany) Benjamin Becker	6	7^{9}
12	(Poland) Łukasz Kubot	4	6^{7}

Qualifying competition
(Netherlands) Igor Sijsling	6	6
(Germany) Benjamin Becker	4	1

==== Fifth qualifier ====
First round
5	(Colombia) Alejandro Falla	7^{8}	4	7^{7}
(Russia) Andrey Kuznetsov	6^{6}	6	6^{3}
WC	(France) Édouard Roger-Vasselin	3	6	5
7	(Romania) Victor Hănescu	6	3	7

Qualifying competition
5	(Colombia) Alejandro Falla	4	7^{7}	6
7	(Romania) Victor Hănescu	6	6^{5}	4

==== Sixth qualifier ====
First round
6	(Japan) Go Soeda	3	2
WC	(France) Florent Serra	6	6
(Russia) Dmitry Tursunov	2	4
9	(Poland) Jerzy Janowicz	6	6

Qualifying competition
WC	(France) Florent Serra	2	4
9	(Poland) Jerzy Janowicz	6	6
