= Bob Bryan career statistics =

This is a list of the main career statistics of tennis player Bob Bryan.

== Major finals ==
=== Grand Slam finals ===
==== Doubles: 30 (16–14) ====
By winning the 2006 Wimbledon title, Bryan completed the men's doubles Career Grand Slam. He became the 19th individual player and, with Mike Bryan, the 7th doubles pair to achieve this.

| Result | Year | Championship | Surface | Partner | Opponents | Score |
|---|---|---|---|---|---|---|
| Win | 2003 | French Open | Clay | (United States) Mike Bryan | (Netherlands) Paul Haarhuis (Russia) Yevgeny Kafelnikov | 7–6^{(7–3)}, 6–3 |
| Loss | 2003 | US Open | Hard | (United States) Mike Bryan | (Sweden) Jonas Björkman (Australia) Todd Woodbridge | 7–5, 0–6, 5–7 |
| Loss | 2004 | Australian Open | Hard | (United States) Mike Bryan | (France) Michaël Llodra (France) Fabrice Santoro | 6–7^{(4–7)}, 3–6 |
| Loss | 2005 | Australian Open (2) | Hard | (United States) Mike Bryan | (Zimbabwe) Wayne Black (Zimbabwe) Kevin Ullyett | 4–6, 4–6 |
| Loss | 2005 | French Open | Clay | (United States) Mike Bryan | (Sweden) Jonas Björkman (Belarus) Max Mirnyi | 6–2, 1–6, 4–6 |
| Loss | 2005 | Wimbledon | Grass | (United States) Mike Bryan | (Australia) Stephen Huss (South Africa) Wesley Moodie | 6–7^{(4–7)}, 3–6, 7–6^{(7–2)}, 3–6 |
| Win | 2005 | US Open | Hard | (United States) Mike Bryan | (Sweden) Jonas Björkman (Belarus) Max Mirnyi | 6–1, 6–4 |
| Win | 2006 | Australian Open | Hard | (United States) Mike Bryan | (Czech Republic) Martin Damm (India) Leander Paes | 4–6, 6–3, 6–4 |
| Loss | 2006 | French Open (2) | Clay | (United States) Mike Bryan | (Sweden) Jonas Björkman (Belarus) Max Mirnyi | 7–6^{(7–5)}, 4–6, 5–7 |
| Win | 2006 | Wimbledon | Grass | (United States) Mike Bryan | (France) Fabrice Santoro (Serbia) Nenad Zimonjić | 6–4, 4–6, 6–4, 6–2 |
| Win | 2007 | Australian Open (2) | Hard | (United States) Mike Bryan | (Sweden) Jonas Björkman (Belarus) Max Mirnyi | 7–5, 7–5 |
| Loss | 2007 | Wimbledon (2) | Grass | (United States) Mike Bryan | (France) Arnaud Clément (France) Michaël Llodra | 7–6^{(7–5)}, 3–6, 4–6, 4–6 |
| Win | 2008 | US Open (2) | Hard | (United States) Mike Bryan | (Czech Republic) Lukáš Dlouhý (India) Leander Paes | 7–6^{(7–5)}, 7–6^{(12–10)} |
| Win | 2009 | Australian Open (3) | Hard | (United States) Mike Bryan | (India) Mahesh Bhupathi (The Bahamas) Mark Knowles | 2–6, 7–5, 6–0 |
| Loss | 2009 | Wimbledon (3) | Grass | (United States) Mike Bryan | (Canada) Daniel Nestor (Serbia) Nenad Zimonjić | 6–7^{(7–9)}, 7–6^{(7–3)}, 6–7^{(5–7)}, 3–6 |
| Win | 2010 | Australian Open (4) | Hard | (United States) Mike Bryan | (Canada) Daniel Nestor (Serbia) Nenad Zimonjić | 6–3, 6–7^{(5–7)}, 6–3 |
| Win | 2010 | US Open (3) | Hard | (United States) Mike Bryan | (India) Rohan Bopanna (Pakistan) Aisam-ul-Haq Qureshi | 7–6^{(7–5)}, 7–6^{(7–4)} |
| Win | 2011 | Australian Open (5) | Hard | (United States) Mike Bryan | (India) Mahesh Bhupathi (India) Leander Paes | 6–3, 6–4 |
| Win | 2011 | Wimbledon (2) | Grass | (United States) Mike Bryan | (Sweden) Robert Lindstedt (Romania) Horia Tecău | 6–3, 6–4, 7–6^{(7–2)} |
| Loss | 2012 | Australian Open (3) | Hard | (United States) Mike Bryan | (India) Leander Paes (Czech Republic) Radek Štěpánek | 6–7^{(1–7)}, 2–6 |
| Loss | 2012 | French Open (3) | Clay | (United States) Mike Bryan | (Belarus) Max Mirnyi (Canada) Daniel Nestor | 4–6, 4–6 |
| Win | 2012 | US Open (4) | Hard | (United States) Mike Bryan | (India) Leander Paes (Czech Republic) Radek Štěpánek | 6–3, 6–4 |
| Win | 2013 | Australian Open (6) | Hard | (United States) Mike Bryan | (Netherlands) Robin Haase (Netherlands) Igor Sijsling | 6–3, 6–4 |
| Win | 2013 | French Open (2) | Clay | (United States) Mike Bryan | (France) Michaël Llodra (France) Nicolas Mahut | 6–4, 4–6, 7–6^{(7–4)} |
| Win | 2013 | Wimbledon (3) | Grass | (United States) Mike Bryan | (Croatia) Ivan Dodig (Brazil) Marcelo Melo | 3–6, 6–3, 6–4, 6–4 |
| Loss | 2014 | Wimbledon (4) | Grass | (United States) Mike Bryan | (United States) Jack Sock (Canada) Vasek Pospisil | 6–7^{(5–7)}, 7–6^{(7–3)}, 4–6, 6–3, 5–7 |
| Win | 2014 | US Open (5) | Hard | (United States) Mike Bryan | (Spain) Marcel Granollers (Spain) Marc López | 6–3, 6–4 |
| Loss | 2015 | French Open (4) | Clay | (United States) Mike Bryan | (Croatia) Ivan Dodig (Brazil) Marcelo Melo | 7–6^{(7–5)}, 6–7^{(5–7)}, 5–7 |
| Loss | 2016 | French Open (5) | Clay | (United States) Mike Bryan | (Spain) Feliciano López (Spain) Marc López | 4–6, 7–6^{(8–6)}, 3–6 |
| Loss | 2017 | Australian Open (4) | Hard | (United States) Mike Bryan | (Finland) Henri Kontinen (Australia) John Peers | 5–7, 5–7 |

==== Mixed doubles: 9 (7–2) ====
| Result | Year | Championship | Surface | Partner | Opponents | Score |
|---|---|---|---|---|---|---|
| Loss | 2002 | US Open | Hard | (Slovenia) Katarina Srebotnik | (United States) Lisa Raymond (United States) Mike Bryan | 6–7^{(9–11)}, 6–7^{(1–7)} |
| Win | 2003 | US Open | Hard | (Slovenia) Katarina Srebotnik | (Russia) Lina Krasnoroutskaya (Canada) Daniel Nestor | 5–7, 7–5, [10–5] |
| Win | 2004 | US Open (2) | Hard | (Russia) Vera Zvonareva | (Australia) Alicia Molik (Australia) Todd Woodbridge | 6–3, 6–4 |
| Loss | 2006 | Wimbledon | Grass | (United States) Venus Williams | (Russia) Vera Zvonareva (Israel) Andy Ram | 3–6, 2–6 |
| Win | 2006 | US Open (3) | Hard | (United States) Martina Navratilova | (Czech Republic) Květa Peschke (Czech Republic) Martin Damm | 6–2, 6–3 |
| Win | 2008 | French Open | Clay | (Belarus) Victoria Azarenka | (Slovenia) Katarina Srebotnik (Serbia) Nenad Zimonjić | 6–2, 7–6^{(7–4)} |
| Win | 2008 | Wimbledon | Grass | (Australia) Samantha Stosur | (Slovenia) Katarina Srebotnik (United States) Mike Bryan | 7–5, 6–4 |
| Win | 2009 | French Open (2) | Clay | (United States) Liezel Huber | (United States) Vania King (Brazil) Marcelo Melo | 5–7, 7–6^{(7–5)}, [10–7] |
| Win | 2010 | US Open (4) | Hard | (United States) Liezel Huber | (Czech Republic) Květa Peschke (Pakistan) Aisam-ul-Haq Qureshi | 6–4, 6–4 |

== Summer Olympics finals ==
=== Doubles: 1 (1–0) ===
| Result | Year | Championship | Surface | Partner | Opponents | Score |
|---|---|---|---|---|---|---|
| Bronze | 2008 | Beijing | Hard | (United States) Mike Bryan | (France) Arnaud Clément (France) Michaël Llodra | 3–6, 6–3, 6–4 |
| Gold | 2012 | London | Grass | (United States) Mike Bryan | (France) Michaël Llodra (France) Jo-Wilfried Tsonga | 6–4, 7–6^{(7–2)} |

== ATP Masters 1000 finals ==
=== Doubles: 59 (39 titles, 20 Losses) ===
| Result | Year | Tournament | Surface | Partner | Opponents | Score |
|---|---|---|---|---|---|---|
| Win | 2002 | Canada (W1) | Hard | (United States) Mike Bryan | (The Bahamas) Mark Knowles (Canada) Daniel Nestor | 4–6, 7–6^{(7–1)}, 6–3 |
| Loss | 2003 | Indian Wells (R1) | Hard | (United States) Mike Bryan | (South Africa) Wayne Ferreira (Russia) Yevgeny Kafelnikov | 1–6, 4–6 |
| Win | 2003 | Cincinnati (W1) | Hard | (United States) Mike Bryan | (Australia) Wayne Arthurs (Australia) Paul Hanley | 7–5, 7–6^{(7–5)} |
| Loss | 2004 | Hamburg (R1) | Clay | (United States) Mike Bryan | (Zimbabwe) Wayne Black (Zimbabwe) Kevin Ullyett | 1–6, 2–6 |
| Loss | 2004 | Madrid (R1) | Hard (i) | (United States) Mike Bryan | (The Bahamas) Mark Knowles (Canada) Daniel Nestor | 3–6, 4–6 |
| Loss | 2005 | Monte Carlo (R1) | Clay | (United States) Mike Bryan | (India) Leander Paes (Serbia and Montenegro) Nenad Zimonjić | W/O |
| Loss | 2005 | Rome (R1) | Clay | (United States) Mike Bryan | (France) Michaël Llodra (France) Fabrice Santoro | 5–7, 4–6 |
| Win | 2005 | Paris (W1) | Hard (i) | (United States) Mike Bryan | (The Bahamas) Mark Knowles (Canada) Daniel Nestor | 6–4, 6–7^{(3–7)}, 6–4 |
| Loss | 2006 | Indian Wells (R2) | Hard | (United States) Mike Bryan | (The Bahamas) Mark Knowles (Canada) Daniel Nestor | 4–6, 4–6 |
| Loss | 2006 | Miami (R1) | Hard | (United States) Mike Bryan | (Sweden) Jonas Björkman (Belarus) Max Mirnyi | 4–6, 4–6 |
| Win | 2006 | Canada (W2) | Hard | (United States) Mike Bryan | (Australia) Paul Hanley (Zimbabwe) Kevin Ullyett | 6–3, 7–5 |
| Loss | 2006 | Cincinnati (R1) | Hard | (United States) Mike Bryan | (Sweden) Jonas Björkman (Belarus) Max Mirnyi | 6–7^{(5–7)}, 4–6 |
| Win | 2006 | Madrid (W1) | Hard (i) | (United States) Mike Bryan | (The Bahamas) Mark Knowles (Canada) Daniel Nestor | 7–5, 6–4 |
| Win | 2007 | Miami (W1) | Hard | (United States) Mike Bryan | (India) Leander Paes (Czech Republic) Martin Damm | 6–7^{(7–9)}, 6–3, [10–7] |
| Win | 2007 | Monte Carlo (W1) | Clay | (United States) Mike Bryan | (France) Julien Benneteau (France) Richard Gasquet | 6–2, 6–1 |
| Loss | 2007 | Rome (R2) | Clay | (United States) Mike Bryan | (France) Fabrice Santoro (Serbia) Nenad Zimonjić | 4–6, 6–7^{(4–7)}, [7–10] |
| Win | 2007 | Hamburg (W1) | Clay | (United States) Mike Bryan | (Australia) Paul Hanley (Zimbabwe) Kevin Ullyett | 6–3, 6–4 |
| Loss | 2007 | Cincinnati (R2) | Hard | (United States) Mike Bryan | (Israel) Jonathan Erlich (Israel) Andy Ram | 6–4, 3–6, [11–13] |
| Win | 2007 | Madrid (W2) | Hard (i) | (United States) Mike Bryan | (Poland) Mariusz Fyrstenberg (Poland) Marcin Matkowski | 6–3, 7–6^{(7–4)} |
| Win | 2007 | Paris (W2) | Hard (i) | (United States) Mike Bryan | (Canada) Daniel Nestor (Serbia) Nenad Zimonjić | 6–3, 7–6^{(7–4)} |
| Win | 2008 | Miami (W2) | Hard | (United States) Mike Bryan | (India) Mahesh Bhupathi (The Bahamas) Mark Knowles | 6–2, 6–2 |
| Win | 2008 | Rome (W1) | Clay | (United States) Mike Bryan | (Canada) Daniel Nestor (Serbia) Nenad Zimonjić | 3–6, 6–4, [10–8] |
| Loss | 2008 | Hamburg (R2) | Clay | (United States) Mike Bryan | (Canada) Daniel Nestor (Serbia) Nenad Zimonjić | 4–6, 7–5, [8–10] |
| Loss | 2008 | Canada (R1) | Hard | (United States) Mike Bryan | (Canada) Daniel Nestor (Serbia) Nenad Zimonjić | 2–6, 6–4, [6–10] |
| Win | 2008 | Cincinnati (W2) | Hard | (United States) Mike Bryan | (Israel) Jonathan Erlich (Israel) Andy Ram | 4–6, 7–6^{(7–2)}, [10–7] |
| Loss | 2009 | Monte Carlo (R2) | Clay | (United States) Mike Bryan | (Canada) Daniel Nestor (Serbia) Nenad Zimonjić | 4–6, 1–6 |
| Loss | 2009 | Rome (R3) | Clay | (United States) Mike Bryan | (Canada) Daniel Nestor (Serbia) Nenad Zimonjić | 6–7^{(5–7)}, 3–6 |
| Loss | 2009 | Cincinnati (R3) | Hard | (United States) Mike Bryan | (Canada) Daniel Nestor (Serbia) Nenad Zimonjić | 6–3, 6–7^{(2–7)}, [13–15] |
| Win | 2010 | Rome (W2) | Clay | (United States) Mike Bryan | (United States) John Isner (United States) Sam Querrey | 6–2, 6–3 |
| Win | 2010 | Madrid (W3) | Clay | (United States) Mike Bryan | (Canada) Daniel Nestor (Serbia) Nenad Zimonjić | 6–3, 6–4 |
| Win | 2010 | Canada (W3) | Hard | (United States) Mike Bryan | (France) Julien Benneteau (France) Michaël Llodra | 7–5, 6–3 |
| Win | 2010 | Cincinnati (W3) | Hard | (United States) Mike Bryan | (India) Mahesh Bhupathi (Belarus) Max Mirnyi | 6–3, 6–4 |
| Win | 2011 | Monte Carlo (W2) | Clay | (United States) Mike Bryan | (Argentina) Juan Ignacio Chela (Brazil) Bruno Soares | 6–3, 6–2 |
| Win | 2011 | adrid (W4) | Clay | (United States) Mike Bryan | (France) Michaël Llodra (Serbia) Nenad Zimonjić | 6–3, 6–3 |
| Loss | 2011 | Canada (R2) | Hard | (United States) Mike Bryan | (France) Michaël Llodra (Serbia) Nenad Zimonjić | 4–6, 7–6^{(7–5)}, [5–10] |
| Win | 2012 | Monte Carlo (W3) | Clay | (United States) Mike Bryan | (Belarus) Max Mirnyi (Canada) Daniel Nestor | 6–2, 6–3 |
| Win | 2012 | Canada (W4) | Hard | (United States) Mike Bryan | (Spain) Marcel Granollers (Spain) Marc López | 6–1, 4–6, [12–10] |
| Win | 2013 | Indian Wells (W1) | Hard | (United States) Mike Bryan | (Philippines) Treat Conrad Huey (Poland) Jerzy Janowicz | 6–3, 3–6, [10–6] |
| Loss | 2013 | Monte Carlo (R3) | Clay | (United States) Mike Bryan | (France) Julien Benneteau (Serbia) Nenad Zimonjić | 6–4, 6–7^{(4–7)}, [12–14] |
| Win | 2013 | Madrid (W5) | Clay | (United States) Mike Bryan | (Austria) Alexander Peya (Brazil) Bruno Soares | 6–2, 6–3 |
| Win | 2013 | Rome (W3) | Clay | (United States) Mike Bryan | (India) Mahesh Bhupathi (India) Rohan Bopanna | 6–2, 6–3 |
| Win | 2013 | Cincinnati (W4) | Hard | (United States) Mike Bryan | (Spain) Marcel Granollers (Spain) Marc López | 6-4, 4-6 [10-4] |
| Win | 2013 | Paris (W3) | Hard (i) | (United States) Mike Bryan | (Austria) Alexander Peya (Brazil) Bruno Soares | 6–3, 6–3 |
| Win | 2014 | Indian Wells (W2) | Hard | (United States) Mike Bryan | (Austria) Alexander Peya (Brazil) Bruno Soares | 6–4, 6–3 |
| Win | 2014 | Miami (W3) | Hard | (United States) Mike Bryan | (Colombia) Juan Sebastián Cabal (Colombia) Robert Farah | 7–6^{(10–8)}, 6–4 |
| Win | 2014 | Monte Carlo (W4) | Clay | (United States) Mike Bryan | (Croatia) Ivan Dodig (Brazil) Marcelo Melo | 6–3, 3–6 [10-8] |
| Loss | 2014 | Madrid (R2) | Clay | (United States) Mike Bryan | (Canada) Daniel Nestor (Serbia) Nenad Zimonjić | 6–4, 6–2 |
| Win | 2014 | Cincinnati (W5) | Hard | (United States) Mike Bryan | (Canada) Vasek Pospisil (United States) Jack Sock | 6–3, 6–2 |
| Win | 2014 | Shanghai Masters (W1) | Hard | (United States) Mike Bryan | (France) Julien Benneteau (France) Édouard Roger-Vasselin | 6–3, 7–6^{(7–3)} |
| Win | 2014 | Paris (W4) | Hard (i) | (United States) Mike Bryan | (Poland) Marcin Matkowski (Austria) Jürgen Melzer | 7–6^{(7–5)}, 5–7, [10–6] |
| Win | 2015 | Miami(W4) | Hard | (United States) Mike Bryan | (Canada) Vasek Pospisil (United States) Jack Sock | 6–3, 1–6, [10–8] |
| Win | 2015 | Monte Carlo (W5) | Clay | (United States) Mike Bryan | (Italy) Simone Bolelli (Italy) Fabio Fognini | 7–6^{(7–3)}, 6–1 |
| Win | 2015 | Canadian Open (W5) | Hard | (United States) Mike Bryan | (Canada) Daniel Nestor (France) Édouard Roger-Vasselin | 7–6^{(7–5)}, 3–6, [10–6] |
| Win | 2016 | Rome (W4) | Clay | (United States) Mike Bryan | (Canada) Vasek Pospisil (United States) Jack Sock | 2–6, 6–3, [10–7] |
| Loss | 2018 | Indian Wells (R3) | Hard | (United States) Mike Bryan | (United States) John Isner (United States) Jack Sock | 6–7^{(4–7)}, 6–7^{(2–7)} |
| Win | 2018 | Miami(W5) | Hard | (United States) Mike Bryan | (Russia) Karen Khachanov (Russia) Andrey Rublev | 4-6, 7-6^{(5)}, [10–4] |
| Win | 2018 | Monte Carlo (W6) | Clay | (United States) Mike Bryan | (Austria) Oliver Marach (Croatia) Mate Pavic | 7–6 ^{(7–5)}, 6–3 |
| Loss | 2018 | Madrid | Clay | (United States) Mike Bryan | (Croatia) Nikola Mektić (Austria) Alexander Peya | 3–5, retired |
| Win | 2019 | Miami (W6) | Hard | (United States) Mike Bryan | (Netherlands) Wesley Koolhof (Greece) Stefanos Tsitsipas | 7–5, 7–6^{(10–8)} |

== Performance timelines ==
Key
| W | F | SF | QF | #R | RR | Q# | DNQ | A | NH |

(W) winner; (F) finalist; (SF) semifinalist; (QF) quarterfinalist; (#R) rounds 4, 3, 2, 1; (RR) round-robin stage; (Q#) qualification round; (DNQ) did not qualify; (A) absent; (NH) not held; (SR) strike rate (events won / competed); (W–L) win–loss record.

=== Doubles ===
| Tournament | 1995 | 1996 | 1997 | 1998 | 1999 | 2000 | 2001 | 2002 | 2003 | 2004 | 2005 | 2006 | 2007 | 2008 | 2009 | 2010 | 2011 | 2012 | 2013 | 2014 | 2015 | 2016 | 2017 | 2018 | 2019 | 2020 | SR | W–L | Win% |
|---|---|---|---|---|---|---|---|---|---|---|---|---|---|---|---|---|---|---|---|---|---|---|---|---|---|---|---|---|---|
| Australian Open | A | A | A | A | A | 1R | 1R | QF | 3R | F | F | W | W | QF | W | W | W | F | W | 3R | 3R | 3R | F | SF | QF | 3R | 6 / 21 | 77–15 | 84% |
| French Open | A | A | A | A | 2R | 2R | 2R | QF | W | SF | F | F | QF | QF | SF | 2R | SF | F | W | QF | F | F | 2R | A | 3R | A | 2 / 20 | 68–18 | 79% |
| Wimbledon | A | A | A | A | 3R | 1R | SF | SF | QF | 3R | F | W | F | SF | F | QF | W | SF | W | F | QF | QF | 2R | A | 3R | NH | 3 / 20 | 72–17 | 81% |
| US Open | 1R | 1R | 1R | 1R | 1R | QF | 2R | SF | F | 3R | W | 3R | QF | W | SF | W | 1R | W | SF | W | 1R | QF | SF | A | 3R | A | 5 / 24 | 67–19 | 78% |
| Win–loss | 0–1 | 0–1 | 0–1 | 0–1 | 3–3 | 4–4 | 6–4 | 14–4 | 14–3 | 13–4 | 21–3 | 18–2 | 17–3 | 16–3 | 19–3 | 16–2 | 16–2 | 20–3 | 22–1 | 16–3 | 10–4 | 13–4 | 11–4 | 4–1 | 9–4 | 2–1 | 16 / 85 | 284–69 | 80.45% |
Year-end championship
| ATP Finals | did not qualify (DNQ) | | | | | | RR | A | W | W | SF | RR | A | F | W | SF | SF | RR | F | W | SF | SF | RR | DNQ | A | DNQ | 4 / 15 | 36–23 | 61% |
National representation
| Olympics | NH | A | not held | | | A | not held | | | QF | not held | | | SF-B | not held | | | G | not held | | | A | not held | | | | 1 / 3 | 11–2 | 85% |
| Davis Cup | A | A | A | A | A | A | A | A | PO | F | 1R | SF | W | SF | QF | A | QF | SF | QF | 1R | 1R | QF | A | A | A | QR | 1 / 12 | 25–5 | 83% |
| Win–loss | 0–0 | 0–0 | 0–0 | 0–0 | 0–0 | 0–0 | 0–0 | 0–0 | 1–0 | 6–1 | 1–1 | 3–0 | 4–0 | 5–2 | 2–0 | 0–0 | 2–0 | 7–0 | 0–2 | 2–0 | 1–0 | 1–1 | 0–0 | 0–0 | 0–0 | 1–0 | 2 / 15 | 36–7 | 84% |
ATP Tour Masters 1000
| Indian Wells | A | A | A | A | QF | 1R | 1R | QF | F | 2R | SF | F | 1R | QF | SF | 1R | 2R | QF | W | W | QF | QF | 1R | F | 2R | NH | 2 / 21 | 42–18 | 70% |
| Miami | A | A | A | A | QF | 3R | QF | 3R | SF | SF | 1R | F | W | W | SF | QF | 2R | SF | 1R | W | W | SF | SF | W | W | NH | 6 / 21 | 63–15 | 81% |
| Monte Carlo | A | A | A | A | A | A | A | 1R | QF | A | F | A | W | QF | F | QF | W | W | F | W | W | 2R | A | W | A | NH | 6 / 14 | 34–7 | 83% |
| Madrid (Note: Until 2001 held in Stuttgart (Hardcourt), 2002–2008 Hardcourt, 2009–present Clay) | A | A | A | A | A | A | 2R | SF | 1R | F | 1R | W | W | QF | 2R | W | W | 2R | W | F | 2R | QF | QF | F | 1R | NH | 5 / 19 | 34–14 | 71% |
| Rome | A | A | A | A | A | A | QF | 1R | 2R | SF | F | QF | F | W | F | W | QF | QF | W | SF | 2R | W | SF | A | QF | A | 4 / 18 | 36–14 | 72% |
| Canada | A | A | A | A | A | A | 2R | W | SF | 2R | SF | W | SF | F | SF | W | F | W | QF | 2R | W | QF | QF | A | QF | NH | 5 / 18 | 39–13 | 75% |
| Cincinnati | A | A | 1R | Q1 | 1R | 1R | QF | QF | W | 2R | 2R | F | F | W | F | W | SF | SF | W | W | QF | SF | QF | A | 2R | A | 5 / 21 | 40–16 | 71% |
| Shanghai | not held | | | | | | | | | | | | | | QF | SF | QF | 2R | SF | W | 2R | SF | A | A | A | NH | 1 / 8 | 12–7 | 63% |
| Paris | A | A | A | A | A | A | 1R | 2R | 1R | 1R | W | SF | W | 2R | QF | SF | 2R | 2R | W | W | QF | QF | QF | A | A | A | 4 / 17 | 22–13 | 63% |
| Hamburg | A | A | A | A | A | A | 2R | 1R | SF | F | QF | SF | W | F | Not Masters Series | | | | | | | | | | | | 1 / 8 | 16–7 | 70% |
| Win–loss | 0–0 | 0–0 | 0–1 | 0–0 | 5–3 | 2–3 | 8–8 | 12–8 | 15–8 | 12–8 | 14–7 | 23–6 | 29–4 | 23–6 | 17–9 | 23–5 | 16–7 | 16–6 | 26–4 | 30–3 | 17–6 | 15–8 | 8–7 | 16–2 | 11–5 | 0–0 | 39 / 165 | 338–124 | 73% |
Career statistics
| | 1995 | 1996 | 1997 | 1998 | 1999 | 2000 | 2001 | 2002 | 2003 | 2004 | 2005 | 2006 | 2007 | 2008 | 2009 | 2010 | 2011 | 2012 | 2013 | 2014 | 2015 | 2016 | 2017 | 2018 | 2019 | 2020 | Career | | |
| Tournaments | 1 | 4 | 7 | 6 | 15 | 17 | 28 | 24 | 26 | 24 | 22 | 21 | 21 | 21 | 24 | 23 | 23 | 21 | 21 | 21 | 21 | 23 | 21 | 9 | 20 | 2 | 466 | | |
| Titles | 0 | 0 | 0 | 0 | 0 | 0 | 4 | 5 | 5 | 7 | 5 | 7 | 11 | 5 | 7 | 11 | 8 | 7 | 11 | 10 | 6 | 3 | 2 | 2 | 2 | 1 | 119 | | |
| Finals | 0 | 0 | 0 | 0 | 1 | 0 | 5 | 8 | 8 | 11 | 11 | 11 | 15 | 12 | 12 | 11 | 11 | 10 | 15 | 13 | 7 | 5 | 3 | 5 | 3 | 1 | 178 | | |
| Hard W–L | 0–1 | 0–3 | 1–6 | 4–5 | 9–11 | 10–11 | 26–14 | 34–11 | 30–12 | 37–10 | 26–10 | 43–5 | 38–5 | 43–13 | 47–10 | 46–9 | 30–12 | 31–8 | 40–11 | 43–7 | 31–11 | 22–16 | 25–13 | 17–5 | 25–11 | 6–1 | 664–231 | | 74% |
| Clay W–L | 0–0 | 1–1 | 0–1 | 0–1 | 4–2 | 4–3 | 8–6 | 8–2 | 18–5 | 17–4 | 15–4 | 12–5 | 22–2 | 16–3 | 16–6 | 18–3 | 20–4 | 17–3 | 20–2 | 16–3 | 10–4 | 18–3 | 5–4 | 9–2 | 6–4 | 0–0 | 280–77 | | 78% |
| Grass W–L | 0–0 | 0–0 | 0–0 | 0–0 | 2–2 | 4–3 | 13–1 | 8–5 | 5–2 | 6–1 | 9–1 | 9–1 | 8–2 | 5–2 | 5–2 | 3–1 | 10–0 | 12–2 | 10–0 | 5–2 | 3–1 | 8–3 | 8–3 | 0–0 | 4–3 | 0–0 | 137–37 | | 79% |
| Carpet W–L | 0–0 | 0–0 | 0–0 | 0–0 | 0–0 | 0–0 | 0–3 | 4–1 | 0–2 | 4–2 | 8–3 | 2–3 | 9–0 | 0–0 | Discontinued | | | | | | | | | | | | 27–14 | | 66% |
| Overall W–L | 0–1 | 1–4 | 1–7 | 4–6 | 15–15 | 18–17 | 47–24 | 54–19 | 53–21 | 64–17 | 58–18 | 66–14 | 77–9 | 64–18 | 68–18 | 67–13 | 60–16 | 60–13 | 70–13 | 64–12 | 44–16 | 48–22 | 38–20 | 26–7 | 35–18 | 6–1 | 1108–359 | | |
| Win % | 0% | 20% | 13% | 40% | 50% | 51% | 66% | 74% | 72% | 79% | 76% | 83% | 90% | 78% | 79% | 84% | 79% | 82% | 84% | 84% | 73% | 69% | 66% | 79% | 66% | 86% | 75.53% | | |
| Year-end rank | N/A | N/A | 429 | 57 | 20 | 21 | 7 | 3 | 1 | 2 | 1 | 1 | 1 | 2 | 1 | 1 | 1 | 1 | 1 | 1 | 2 | 3 | 5 | 7 (Note: The team finished seventh in year-end rankings at the end of 2018 season, as Bob ended his season early due to a hip injury.) | 9 | 32 | $31,066,944 | | |

=== Mixed doubles ===
| Tournament | 1999 | 2000 | 2001 | 2002 | 2003 | 2004 | 2005 | 2006 | 2007 | 2008 | 2009 | 2010 | 2011 | 2012 | 2013 | 2014 | 2015 | 2016 | 2017 | 2018 | 2019 | 2020 | SR | W–L | Win % |
|---|---|---|---|---|---|---|---|---|---|---|---|---|---|---|---|---|---|---|---|---|---|---|---|---|---|
| Australian Open | A | A | A | QF | 1R | 1R | QF | QF | QF | A | A | 2R | 2R | A | QF | A | A | QF | A | A | A | A | 0 / 10 | 14–10 | 58% |
| French Open | 2R | QF | A | SF | QF | QF | A | SF | QF | W | W | A | A | 1R | A | A | 1R | QF | A | A | A | ND | 2 / 12 | 27–10 | 73% |
| Wimbledon | QF | 1R | QF | QF | 2R | SF | 2R | F | 3R | W | QF | 2R | QF | SF | A | 3R | 2R | A | A | A | A | ND | 1 / 16 | 37–15 | 71% |
| US Open | A | A | 1R | F | W | W | QF | W | 2R | A | A | W | 2R | 2R | A | A | A | A | A | A | A | ND | 4 / 10 | 29–6 | 83% |
| Win–loss | 4–2 | 3–2 | 3–2 | 12–4 | 8–3 | 10–3 | 4–3 | 14–3 | 6–4 | 11–0 | 7–1 | 7–2 | 5–3 | 4–3 | 2–1 | 2–1 | 0–2 | 4–2 | 0–0 | 0–0 | 0–0 | 0–0 | 7 / 48 | 106–41 | 57% |

== ATP Tour career earnings ==
| Year | Grand Slam doubles titles | ATP doubles titles | Total doubles titles | Earnings ($) | Money list rank |
|---|---|---|---|---|---|
| 1997-98 | 0 | 0 | 0 | $14,925 | 383 |
| 1999 | 0 | 0 | 0 | $113,351 | 154 |
| 2000-01 | 0 | 4 | 4 | $566,875 | n/a |
| 2002 | 0 | 5 | 5 | $401,068 | 52 |
| 2003 | 1 | 4 | 5 | $633,879 | 30 |
| 2004 | 0 | 7 | 7 | $503,831 | 43 |
| 2005 | 1 | 4 | 5 | $744,842 | 23 |
| 2006 | 2 | 5 | 7 | $810,930 | 19 |
| 2007 | 1 | 10 | 11 | $890,210 | 20 |
| 2008 | 1 | 4 | 5 | $807,231 | 28 |
| 2009 | 1 | 6 | 7 | $872,959 | 22 |
| 2010 | 2 | 9 | 11 | $1,143,970 | 18 |
| 2011 | 2 | 6 | 8 | $1,051,334 |
| 2012 | 1 | 6 | 7 | $916,603 | 26 |
| 2013 | 3 | 8 | 11 | $1,730,604 | 12 |
| 2014 | 1 | 9 | 10 | $1,493,490 |
| 2015 | 0 | 6 | 6 | $775,723 |
| 2016 | 0 | 3 | 3 | $782,511 |
| 2017 | 0 | 2 | 2 | $539,231 |
| 2018 | 0 | 2 | 2 | $717,177 |
| 2019 | 0 | 2 | 2 | $342,422 | 66T |
| Career* | 16 | 102 | 118 | $15,755,415 | 34 |

== See also ==
- Bob and Mike Bryan
- List of twins
