= 2021 Stockholm Open =

Men's tennis tournament

- Date: 7–13 November
- Edition: 52nd
- Category: ATP Tour 250 series
- Draw: 28S / 16D
- Prize money: €635,750
- Surface: Hard (indoor)
- Location: Stockholm, Sweden
- Venue: Kungliga tennishallen

Champions

Singles
- (United States) Tommy Paul

Doubles
- (Mexico) Santiago González / (Argentina) Andrés Molteni
- Stockholm Open

The 2021 Stockholm Open was a professional men's tennis tournament played on indoor hard courts. It was the 52nd edition of the tournament, and part of the ATP Tour 250 series of the 2021 ATP Tour. It took place at the Kungliga tennishallen in Stockholm, Sweden from 7 to 13 November 2021. Unseeded Tommy Paul won the singles title.

== Finals ==
=== Singles ===
- (United States) Tommy Paul defeated (Canada) Denis Shapovalov, 6–4, 2–6, 6–4

Paul won his first ATP Tour title.

=== Doubles ===
- (Mexico) Santiago González / (Argentina) Andrés Molteni defeated (Pakistan) Aisam-ul-Haq Qureshi / (Netherlands) Jean-Julien Rojer 6–2, 6–2.

== Singles main-draw entrants ==
=== Seeds ===
Country	Player	Rank^{1}	Seed
ITA	Jannik Sinner	9	1
CAN	Félix Auger-Aliassime	11	2
CAN	Denis Shapovalov	19	3
GBR	Dan Evans	24	4
USA	Taylor Fritz	26	5
KAZ	Alexander Bublik	36	6
HUN	Márton Fucsovics	40	7
USA	Frances Tiafoe	41	8

- Rankings were as of November 1, 2021

=== Other entrants ===
The following players received wildcards into the singles main draw:

- (Sweden) Leo Borg
- (United Kingdom) Andy Murray
- (Sweden) Elias Ymer

The following players received entry from the qualifying draw:

- (Norway) Viktor Durasovic
- (Uzbekistan) Denis Istomin
- (Russia) Pavel Kotov
- (Italy) Andrea Vavassori

The following players received entry as lucky losers:

- (Belarus) Egor Gerasimov
- (Slovakia) Jozef Kovalík
- (Croatia) Nino Serdarušić

=== Withdrawals ===
Before the tournament

- (Georgia (country)) Nikoloz Basilashvili → replaced by (United States) Tommy Paul
- (Australia) Alex de Minaur → replaced by (France) Adrian Mannarino
- (Bulgaria) Grigor Dimitrov → replaced by (France) Arthur Rinderknech
- (Chile) Cristian Garín → replaced by (United States) Taylor Fritz
- (France) Ugo Humbert → replaced by (Spain) Alejandro Davidovich Fokina
- (Poland) Hubert Hurkacz → replaced by (Belarus) Egor Gerasimov
- (Russia) Aslan Karatsev → replaced by (Croatia) Nino Serdarušić
- (France) Gaël Monfils → replaced by (Hungary) Márton Fucsovics
- (United Kingdom) Cameron Norrie → replaced by (Germany) Peter Gojowczyk
- (Norway) Casper Ruud → replaced by (United States) Mackenzie McDonald
- (Argentina) Diego Schwartzman → replaced by (United States) Frances Tiafoe
- (Italy) Lorenzo Sonego → replaced by (Slovakia) Jozef Kovalík
- (Germany) Alexander Zverev → replaced by (Finland) Emil Ruusuvuori

== Doubles main-draw entrants ==
=== Seeds ===
Country	Player	Country	Player	Rank^{1}	Seed
CRO	Ivan Dodig	BRA	Marcelo Melo	35	1
~~GER~~	~~Tim Pütz~~	~~NZL~~	~~Michael Venus~~	~~41~~	~~2~~
GBR	Ken Skupski	GBR	Neal Skupski	76	3
KAZ	Alexander Bublik	KAZ	Andrey Golubev	79	4

- Rankings were as of November 1, 2021

=== Other entrants ===
The following pairs received wildcards into the doubles main draw:

- (Sweden) Markus Eriksson / (Sweden) Elias Ymer
- (Sweden) André Göransson / (Sweden) Robert Lindstedt

The following pairs received entry into the doubles main draw as alternates:

- (Sweden) Karl Friberg / (Egypt) Mohamed Safwat
- (Sweden) Simon Freund / (Croatia) Nino Serdarušić

=== Withdrawals ===
Before the tournament

- (El Salvador) Marcelo Arévalo / (Mexico) Santiago González → replaced by (Mexico) Santiago González / (Argentina) Andrés Molteni
- (Italy) Simone Bolelli / (Argentina) Máximo González → replaced by (Bosnia and Herzegovina) Tomislav Brkić / (Serbia) Nikola Ćaćić
- (India) Rohan Bopanna / (Canada) Denis Shapovalov → replaced by (Uruguay) Ariel Behar / (Ecuador) Gonzalo Escobar
- (Belgium) Sander Gillé / (Belgium) Joran Vliegen → replaced by (Finland) Emil Ruusuvuori / (Netherlands) Botic van de Zandschulp
- (Netherlands) Wesley Koolhof / (Netherlands) Jean-Julien Rojer → replaced by (Pakistan) Aisam-ul-Haq Qureshi / (Netherlands) Jean-Julien Rojer
- (South Africa) Raven Klaasen / (Japan) Ben McLachlan → replaced by (France) Fabrice Martin / (Monaco) Hugo Nys
- (Germany) Kevin Krawietz / (Romania) Horia Tecău → replaced by (Spain) Pedro Martínez / (Italy) Andrea Vavassori
- (United Kingdom) Jamie Murray / (Brazil) Bruno Soares → replaced by (United States) Taylor Fritz / (United States) Tommy Paul
- (Australia) John Peers / (Slovakia) Filip Polášek → replaced by (Sweden) Karl Friberg / (Egypt) Mohamed Safwat
- (Germany) Tim Pütz / (New Zealand) Michael Venus → replaced by (Sweden) Simon Freund / (Croatia) Nino Serdarušić
