= Florin Mergea =

Romanian tennis player

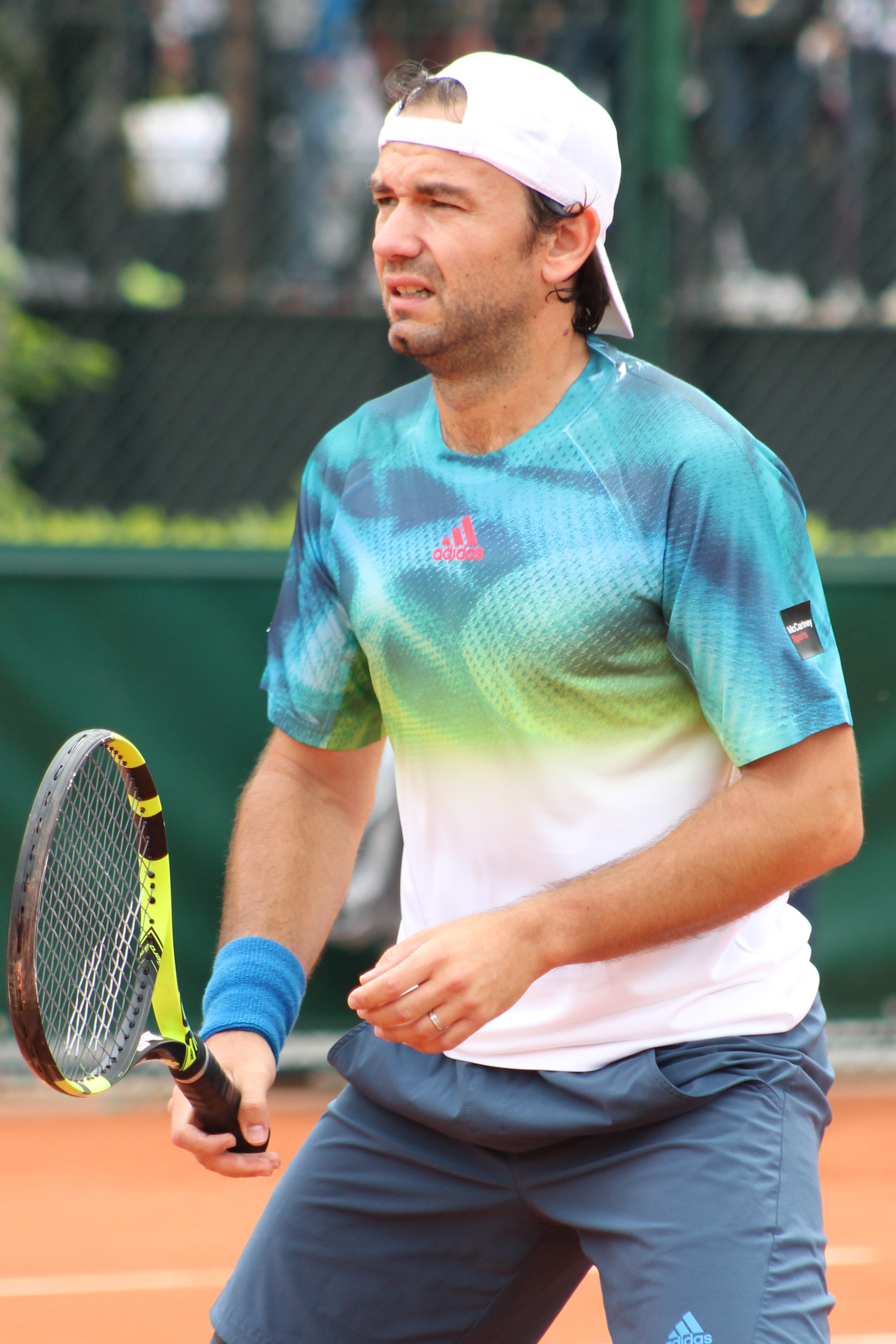
- Mergea at the 2016 French Open
- Country (sports): Romania
- Residence: Bucharest, Romania
- Born: 26 January 1985 (age 41) Craiova, Romania
- Height: 1.80 m (5 ft 11 in)
- Turned pro: 2003
- Retired: 2022
- Plays: Right-handed (one-handed backhand)
- Prize money: $1,682,712

Singles
- Career record: 3–4
- Career titles: 0
- Highest ranking: No. 243 (9 May 2005)

Grand Slam singles results
- Australian Open: Q2 (2006)
- Wimbledon: Q2 (2004)
- US Open: Q1 (2005)

Doubles
- Career record: 152–120
- Career titles: 7
- Highest ranking: No. 7 (13 July 2015)

Grand Slam doubles results
- Australian Open: QF (2015)
- French Open: SF (2014)
- Wimbledon: SF (2015)
- US Open: QF (2015)

Other doubles tournaments
- Tour Finals: F (2015)

Grand Slam mixed doubles results
- Australian Open: 2R (2015)
- French Open: 2R (2015)
- Wimbledon: 3R (2014)
- US Open: 1R (2014, 2015)
Medal record
Representing Romania
Men's Tennis
Silver medal – second place	2016 Rio de Janeiro	Doubles
- Last updated on: 20 November 2023.

Florin Mergea (Romanian pronunciation: [floˈrin ˈmerdʒe̯a]; born 26 January 1985) is a Romanian former professional tennis player. As a doubles specialist, he has reached the final of the ATP World Tour Finals in 2015 and won an ATP Masters title at the Mutua Madrid Open earlier that year. He achieved a career-high ATP ranking of World No. 7 in doubles (July 2015) and World No. 243 in singles (May 2005).

== Junior career ==
As a junior Mergea compiled a singles win–loss record of 87–33, reaching as high as No. 2 in the world in July 2003 (and No. 1 in doubles). Along the way, he beat future top ten singles players like Andy Murray, Tomas Berdych, Gaël Monfils and Jo-Wilfried Tsonga. As well as winning the Boys' Singles at Wimbledon in 2003 and being runner-up in the Boys' Singles tournament at the 2003 Australian Open, he won the Boys' Doubles in 2002 alongside compatriot Horia Tecău.

== Professional career ==
The transition to the seniors tour proved difficult for Mergea. After turning pro in 2003, he struggled to make a breakthrough. Injuries hampered his career and in spite of reaching no. 103 in the doubles rankings, his lack of singles success and limited support drained his motivation. In 2010, Mergea decided to retire from tennis, a decision he turned around months later, with the help of his wife, Daiana. With renewed focus on the doubles game, his rankings rose steadily, playing alongside the likes of Andrei Daescu and Philipp Marx. After reaching thirteen challenger finals within little over a year, Mergea won his first ATP title in October 2013, when he teamed up with Lukas Rosol for the Erste Bank Open, Vienna.

Tour success continued in 2014, as he won the Royal Guard Open in Vina del Mar, with veteran Oliver Marach, and his first ATP 500 title at the International German Open in Hamburg, with Marin Draganja. Furthermore, siding with the Croatian, Mergea reached the French Open semifinal.

After starting 2015 with Dominic Inglot and reaching two finals, his injury plagued British partner needed time to recover. This gave way to the formation of his partnership with Rohan Bopanna, whom he had played with successfully at the Shanghai Masters the previous season. Together, they found consistency in their results, while winning the Madrid Masters and the Mercedes Cup in Stuttgart. In November, the team were the last to qualify for the ATP World Tour Finals. There, in spite of their seeding, they reached the final against the year-end No. 1 team of Mergea's Davis Cup and former juniors' partner, Romanian Horia Tecău, who played alongside Jean Julien Rojer.

He won the 2016 BRD Năstase Țiriac Trophy and the silver medal at the 2016 Olympic Games in Rio de Janeiro, alongside compatriot Horia Tecău.

In 2017, he won the title in Barcelona partnering with Aisam-ul-Haq Qureshi.

Mergea announced his retirement from professional tennis in March 2022, in order to focus on training young tennis players.

== Significant finals ==
=== Year-end championships ===
==== Doubles: 1 (1 runner-up) ====
Result	Year	Championship	Surface	Partner	Opponents	Score
Loss	2015	ATP World Tour Finals, London	Hard (i)	(India) Rohan Bopanna	(Netherlands) Jean-Julien Rojer (Romania) Horia Tecău	4–6, 3–6

=== Masters 1000 finals ===
==== Doubles: 2 (1 title, 1 runner-up) ====
Result	Year	Tournament	Surface	Partner	Opponents	Score
Win	2015	Madrid Open	Clay	(India) Rohan Bopanna	(Poland) Marcin Matkowski (Serbia) Nenad Zimonjić	6–2, 6–7^{(5–7)}, [11–9]
Loss	2016	Madrid Open	Clay	(India) Rohan Bopanna	(Netherlands) Jean-Julien Rojer (Romania) Horia Tecău	4–6, 6–7^{(5–7)}

=== Olympic medal matches ===
==== Doubles: 1 (1 silver medal) ====
Result	Year	Championship	Surface	Partner	Opponents	Score
Silver	2016	Summer Olympics, Rio de Janeiro	Hard	(Romania) Horia Tecau	(Spain) Marc Lopez (Spain) Rafael Nadal	2–6, 6–3, 4–6

== ATP career finals ==
=== Doubles: 15 (7 titles, 8 runners-up) ===
Legend Grand Slam Tournaments (0–0) ATP World Tour Finals (0–1) ATP World Tour Masters 1000 (1–1) Olympic Games (0–1) ATP World Tour 500 Series (2–1) ATP World Tour 250 Series (4–4)	Finals by surface Hard (1–4) Clay (5–2) Grass (1–1) Carpet (0–0)

Result	W–L	Date	Tournament	Tier	Surface	Partner	Opponents	Score
Win	1–0	Oct 2013	Vienna Open, Austria	250 Series	Hard (i)	(Czech Republic) Lukáš Rosol	(Canada) Daniel Nestor (Austria) Julian Knowle	7–5, 6–4
Win	2–0	Feb 2014	Chile Open, Chile	250 Series	Clay	(Austria) Oliver Marach	(Colombia) Juan Sebastián Cabal (Colombia) Robert Farah	6–3, 6–4
Win	3–0	Jul 2014	German Open, Germany	500 Series	Clay	(Croatia) Marin Draganja	(Austria) Alexander Peya (Brazil) Bruno Soares	6–4, 7–5
Loss	3–1	Jan 2015	Auckland Open, New Zealand	250 Series	Hard	(United Kingdom) Dominic Inglot	(South Africa) Raven Klaasen (India) Leander Paes	6–7^{(1–7)}, 4–6
Loss	3–2	Feb 2015	Open Sud de France, France	250 Series	Hard (i)	(United Kingdom) Dominic Inglot	(New Zealand) Marcus Daniell (New Zealand) Artem Sitak	6–3, 4–6, [14–16]
Loss	3–3	Apr 2015	Grand Prix Hassan II, Morocco	250 Series	Clay	(India) Rohan Bopanna	(Australia) Rameez Junaid (Canada) Adil Shamasdin	6–3, 2–6, [7–10]
Win	4–3	May 2015	Madrid Open, Spain	Masters 1000	Clay	(India) Rohan Bopanna	(Poland) Marcin Matkowski (Serbia) Nenad Zimonjić	6–2, 6–7^{(5–7)}, [11–9]
Win	5–3	Jun 2015	Stuttgart Open, Germany	250 Series	Grass	(India) Rohan Bopanna	(Austria) Alexander Peya (Brazil) Bruno Soares	5–7, 6–2, [10–7]
Loss	5–4	Jun 2015	Halle Open, Germany	500 Series	Grass	(India) Rohan Bopanna	(South Africa) Raven Klaasen (United States) Rajeev Ram	6–7^{(5–7)}, 2–6
Loss	5–5	Nov 2015	ATP World Tour Finals, United Kingdom	Tour Finals	Hard (i)	(India) Rohan Bopanna	(Netherlands) Jean-Julien Rojer (Romania) Horia Tecău	4–6, 3–6
Loss	5–6	Jan 2016	Sydney International, Australia	250 Series	Hard	(India) Rohan Bopanna	(United Kingdom) Jamie Murray (Brazil) Bruno Soares	3–6, 6–7^{(6–8)}
Win	6–6	Apr 2016	Romanian Open, Romania	250 Series	Clay	(Romania) Horia Tecău	(Australia) Chris Guccione (Brazil) André Sá	7–5, 6–4
Loss	6–7	May 2016	Madrid Open, Spain	Masters 1000	Clay	(India) Rohan Bopanna	(Netherlands) Jean-Julien Rojer (Romania) Horia Tecău	4–6, 6–7^{(5–7)}
Loss	6–8	Aug 2016	Olympic Games, Brazil	Olympics	Hard	(Romania) Horia Tecău	(Spain) Marc López (Spain) Rafael Nadal	2–6, 6–3, 4–6
Win	7–8	Apr 2017	Barcelona Open, Spain	500 Series	Clay	(Pakistan) Aisam-ul-Haq Qureshi	(Germany) Philipp Petzschner (Austria) Alexander Peya	6–4, 6–3

== ATP Challenger and ITF Futures finals ==
=== Singles 13 (7 titles, 6 runners-up) ===
Legend
ATP Challenger Tour (0–0)
ITF Futures Circuit (7–6)

Result	W–L	Date	Tournament	Tier	Surface	Opponent	Score
Loss	0–1	May 2003	Kuwait F2, Mishref	Futures	Hard	(Slovakia) Ivo Klec	6–3, 3–6, 4–6
Loss	0–2	May 2003	Kuwait F3, Mishref	Futures	Hard	(Slovakia) Ivo Klec	4–6, 4–6
Win	1–2	May 2004	Lebanon F2, Jounieh	Futures	Clay	(France) Augustin Gensse	4–6, 6–3, 6–3
Win	2–2	Oct 2004	France F18, Saint-Brieuc	Futures	Hard (i)	(France) Nicolas Thomann	6–7^{(4–7)}, 7–6^{(8–6)}, 6–3
Win	3–2	Jan 2005	USA F1, Tampa	Futures	Hard	(United States) Matías Boeker	6–2, 6–3
Win	4–2	Apr 2005	Kuwait F1, Mishref	Futures	Hard	(Kuwait) Mohammad Ghareeb	4–6, 6–3, 7–5
Win	5–2	Oct 2005	France F16, Nevers	Futures	Hard (i)	(France) Jean-Michel Pequery	7–6^{(7–4)}, 6–7^{(2–7)}, 6–2
Loss	5–3	Oct 2005	France F18, La Roche-sur-Yon	Futures	Hard (i)	(France) Olivier Vandewiele	6–7^{(2–7)}, 6–3, 4–6
Loss	5–4	Jun 2006	Romania F5, Zalău	Futures	Clay	(Romania) Adrian Cruciat	4–6, 6–3, 3–6
Loss	5–5	Jun 2006	Romania F6, Pitești	Futures	Clay	(Romania) Gabriel Moraru	3–6, 4–6
Win	6–5	Jan 2007	Germany F1, Nußloch	Futures	Carpet (i)	(Jamaica) Dustin Brown	6–3, 6–2
Win	7–5	May 2007	Romania F2, Bucharest	Futures	Clay	(Romania) Gabriel Moraru	2–6, 7–5, 7–6^{(7–3)}
Loss	7–6	Mar 2007	Canada F2, Montreal	Futures	Hard (i)	(Netherlands) Martin Verkerk	7–6^{(10–8)}, 6–7^{(9–11)}, 4–6

=== Doubles 77 (45 titles, 32 runners-up) ===
Legend
ATP Challenger Tour (17–18)
ITF Futures Circuit (28–14)

Result	W–L	Date	Tournament	Tier	Surface	Partner	Opponents	Score
Loss	0–1	Feb 2003	Croatia F2, Zagreb	Futures	Hard (i)	(Romania) Horia Tecău	(Croatia) Ivan Cinkuš (Slovenia) Andrej Kračman	7–5, 6–7^{(8–6)}, 1–6
Win	1–1	Apr 2003	Greece F2, Kalamata	Futures	Hard	(Romania) Horia Tecău	(Greece) Konstantinos Economidis (Greece) Nikos Rovas	6–4, 1–6, 6–3
Win	2–1	May 2003	Kuwait F2, Mishref	Futures	Hard	(Romania) Horia Tecău	(Slovakia) Ivo Klec (Czech Republic) Josef Nesticky	6–4, 7–6^{(8–6)}
Win	3–1	May 2003	Kuwait F3, Mishref	Futures	Hard	(Romania) Horia Tecău	(Kuwait) Musaad Al Jazzaf (United Arab Emirates) Omar Alawadhi	6–2, 7–5
Loss	3–2	Jul 2003	Romania F4, Bucharest	Futures	Clay	(Romania) Horia Tecău	(Romania) Adrian Barbu (Romania) Cătălin-Ionuț Gârd	3–0 ret.
Win	4–2	Apr 2004	Greece F2, Syros	Futures	Hard	(Romania) Horia Tecău	(Czech Republic) Roman Michalik (Czech Republic) Pavel Šnobel	7–5, 3–6, 6–3
Win	5–2	Apr 2004	Qatar F1, Al Khor	Futures	Hard	(Romania) Horia Tecău	(Germany) Frank Moser (Germany) Bernard Parun	6–1, 6–2
Loss	5–3	May 2004	Lebanon F1, Jounieh	Futures	Clay	(Romania) Horia Tecău	(India) Mustafa Ghouse (India) Harsh Mankad	3–6, 7–5, 6–7^{(1–7)}
Win	6–3	May 2004	Lebanon F2, Jounieh	Futures	Clay	(Romania) Horia Tecău	(Croatia) Ivan Cerović (Greece) Alexandros Jakupovic	0–6, 6–3, 6–1
Loss	6–4	Jul 2004	Romania F11, Bucharest	Futures	Clay	(Romania) Horia Tecău	(Romania) Adrian Cruciat (Romania) Adrian Gavrilă	6–0, 4–6, 4–6
Win	7–4	Aug 2004	Timișoara, Romania	Challenger	Clay	(Romania) Horia Tecău	(Romania) Marius Călugăru (Romania) Ciprian Petre Porumb	6–3, 6–3
Loss	7–5	Aug 2004	Samarkand, Uzbekistan	Challenger	Clay	(Germany) Sebastian Fitz	(France) Jean-François Bachelot (Netherlands) Melle van Gemerden	2–6, 6–3, 1–6
Win	8–5	Oct 2004	Rome, Italy	Challenger	Clay	(Austria) Werner Eschauer	(Italy) Francesco Aldi (Italy) Francesco Piccari	6–7^{(5–7)}, 6–3, 6–0
Win	9–5	Oct 2004	France F18, Saint-Brieuc	Futures	Hard (i)	(France) Jean-François Bachelot	(Tunisia) Walid Jallali (United States) Jamal Parker	6–2, 6–3
Win	10–5	Apr 2005	Kuwait F1, Mishref	Futures	Hard	(Jamaica) Ryan Russell	(Czech Republic) Jakub Hašek (Czech Republic) Josef Nesticky	6–1, 3–0 ret.
Win	11–5	Jan 2006	Austria F2, Salzburg	Futures	Carpet (i)	(Austria) Werner Eschauer	(Bulgaria) Todor Enev (Bulgaria) Ilia Kushev	6–2, 6–3
Loss	11–6	Feb 2006	Germany F5, Mettmann	Futures	Carpet (i)	(Romania) Gabriel Moraru	(Germany) Philipp Petzschner (United States) Phil Stolt	3–6, 3–6
Win	12–6	May 2006	Romania F4, Bucharest	Futures	Clay	(Romania) Adrian Barbu	(Romania) Victor Ioniță (Romania) Gabriel Moraru	1–6, 6–3, 7–6^{(7–3)}
Win	13–6	Jun 2006	Romania F5, Zalău	Futures	Clay	(Romania) Adrian Barbu	(Denmark) Jacob Melskens (Denmark) Martin Pedersen	6–2, 6–3
Win	14–6	Jun 2006	Romania F6, Pitești	Futures	Clay	(Romania) Adrian Barbu	(Romania) Adrian Gavrilă (Romania) Andrei Mlendea	3–6, 7–5, 6–3
Loss	14–7	Jul 2006	Constanța, Romania	Challenger	Clay	(Romania) Horia Tecău	(Greece) Konstantinos Economidis (Netherlands Antilles) Jean-Julien Rojer	6–7^{(1–7)}, 1–6
Loss	14–8	Nov 2006	Seoul, South Korea	Challenger	Hard	(Thailand) Danai Udomchoke	(Austria) Alexander Peya (Germany) Björn Phau	4–6, 2–6
Win	15–8	Jan 2007	Germany F1, Nußloch	Futures	Carpet (i)	(Germany) Philipp Marx	(Poland) Tomasz Bednarek (Germany) Frank Moser	6–3, 7–5
Loss	15–9	Mar 2007	France F4, Lille	Futures	Hard (i)	(United States) Brian Wilson	(France) Grégory Carraz (France) Alexandre Sidorenko	7–6^{(7–4)}, 4–6, 3–6
Win	16–9	May 2007	Romania F2, Bucharest	Futures	Clay	(Romania) Petru-Alexandru Luncanu	(Romania) Raian Luchici (United States) Brett Ross	6–4, 6–2
Win	17–9	Jun 2007	Romania F5, Bacău	Futures	Clay	(Romania) Horia Tecău	(Romania) Cosmin Cotet (Romania) Bogdan Leonte	6–7^{(5–7)}, 7–6^{(14–12)}, 6–2
Win	18–9	Jul 2007	Almaty, Kazakhstan	Challenger	Clay	(Romania) Teodor-Dacian Crăciun	(Kazakhstan) Alexey Kedryuk (Russia) Alexander Kudryavtsev	6–2, 6–1
Win	19–9	Sep 2007	Brașov, Romania	Challenger	Clay	(Romania) Horia Tecău	(Romania) Adrian Cruciat (Romania) Marcel-Ioan Miron	5–7, 6–3, [10–8]
Loss	19–10	Sep 2007	Bucharest, Romania	Challenger	Clay	(Romania) Horia Tecău	(Spain) Marcel Granollers (Spain) Santiago Ventura	2–6, 1–6
Loss	19–11	Oct 2007	France F17, Saint-Dizier	Futures	Hard (i)	(Czech Republic) Lukáš Rosol	(Austria) Martin Slanar (Czech Republic) Pavel Šnobel	2–6, 3–6
Win	20–11	Mar 2008	Cherbourg, France	Challenger	Hard (i)	(Romania) Horia Tecău	(Switzerland) Jean-Claude Scherrer (Brazil) Márcio Torres	7–5, 7–5
Loss	20–12	Apr 2008	Cremona, Italy	Challenger	Hard	(Romania) Horia Tecău	(Argentina) Eduardo Schwank (Serbia) Dušan Vemić	3–6, 2–6
Win	21–12	May 2008	Marrakech, Morocco	Challenger	Clay	(Portugal) Fred Gil	(United Kingdom) James Auckland (United Kingdom) Jamie Delgado	6–2, 6–3
Win	22–12	Jun 2008	Constanța, Romania	Challenger	Clay	(Romania) Horia Tecău	(Brazil) Júlio Silva (Italy) Simone Vagnozzi	6–4, 6–2
Loss	22–13	Jul 2008	Timișoara, Romania	Challenger	Clay	(Romania) Horia Tecău	(Spain) Daniel Muñoz de la Nava (Spain) Rubén Ramírez Hidalgo	6–3, 4–6, [9–11]
Win	23–13	Apr 2009	Turkey F3, Belek	Futures	Clay	(Romania) Costin Pavăl	(Ukraine) Ivan Anikanov (Ukraine) Artem Smirnov	7–6^{(7–4)}, 6–3
Loss	23–14	May 2009	Romania F2, Bucharest	Futures	Clay	(Romania) Costin Pavăl	(Moldova) Radu Albot (Moldova) Andrei Ciumac	1–6, 2–6
Loss	23–15	May 2009	Romania F4, Bucharest	Futures	Clay	(Romania) Alexandru-Raul Lazar	(Greece) Alexandros Jakupovic (France) Alexandre Renard	1–6, 0–6
Loss	23–16	Jun 2009	Constanța, Romania	Challenger	Clay	(Romania) Adrian Cruciat	(Chile) Adrián García (Spain) David Marrero	6–7^{(5–7)}, 2–6
Loss	23–17	Aug 2011	Romania F7, Iași	Futures	Clay	(Romania) Victor-Mugurel Anagnastopol	(Moldova) Andrei Ciumac (Moldova) Maxim Dubarenco	2–6, 6–2, [9–11]
Win	24–17	Aug 2011	Romania F8, Cluj-Napoca	Futures	Clay	(Romania) Victor-Mugurel Anagnastopol	(Malaysia) Mohd Assri Merzuki (Romania) Gabriel Moraru	6–3, 5–7, [10–1]
Win	25–17	Sep 2011	Brașov, Romania (2)	Challenger	Clay	(Romania) Victor-Mugurel Anagnastopol	(Serbia) Dušan Lojda (France) Benoît Paire	6–2, 6–3
Win	26–17	Oct 2011	Germany F16, Leimen	Futures	Hard (i)	(Romania) Victor-Mugurel Anagnastopol	(Ivory Coast) Terence Nugent (Germany) Tim Pütz	7–6^{(7–3)}, 6–2
Win	27–17	Oct 2011	Croatia F12, Solin	Futures	Clay	(Romania) Victor-Mugurel Anagnastopol	(Croatia) Marin Draganja (Croatia) Dino Marcan	6–4, 7–5
Loss	27–18	Oct 2011	Croatia F13, Dubrovnik	Futures	Clay	(Romania) Victor-Mugurel Anagnastopol	(Croatia) Marin Draganja (Croatia) Dino Marcan	1–6, 4–6
Loss	27–19	Oct 2011	Croatia F14, Dubrovnik	Futures	Clay	(Romania) Victor-Mugurel Anagnastopol	(Croatia) Marin Draganja (Croatia) Dino Marcan	6–7^{(4–7)}, 6–7^{(3–7)}
Win	28–19	Feb 2012	Croatia F1, Zagreb	Futures	Hard (i)	(Romania) Andrei Dăescu	(Bosnia and Herzegovina) Mirza Bašić (Croatia) Mate Delić	7–5, 6–1
Win	29–19	Feb 2012	Croatia F2, Zagreb	Futures	Hard (i)	(Romania) Andrei Dăescu	(Croatia) Ivan Sabanov (Croatia) Matej Sabanov	4–6, 6–4, [10–4]
Loss	29–20	Mar 2012	Canada F1, Gatineau	Futures	Hard (i)	(Romania) Andrei Dăescu	(United States) Devin Britton (Australia) John-Patrick Smith	7–5, 3–6, [5–10]
Win	30–20	Mar 2012	Canada F2, Sherbrooke	Futures	Carpet (i)	(Romania) Andrei Dăescu	(Canada) Milan Pokrajac (Canada) Peter Polansky	7–6^{(8–6)}, 3–6, [10–1]
Win	31–20	Apr 2012	France F7, Angers	Futures	Clay	(Romania) Andrei Dăescu	(France) Marc Gicquel (France) Nicolas Renavand	6–2, 3–6, [10–7]
Loss	31–21	Apr 2012	Rome, Italy	Challenger	Clay	(Romania) Andrei Dăescu	(Germany) Dustin Brown (United Kingdom) Jonathan Marray	4–6, 6–7^{(0–7)}
Win	32–21	May 2012	Romania F1, Cluj-Napoca	Futures	Clay	(Romania) Andrei Dăescu	(Romania) Llaurentiu-Ady Gavrila (Romania) Dragos Cristian Mirtea	7–6^{(7–2)}, 6–1
Win	33–21	May 2012	Romania F2, Bucharest	Futures	Clay	(Romania) Andrei Dăescu	(Romania) Victor Crivoi (Romania) Marius Copil	7–6^{(7–4)}, 6–2
Loss	33–22	Jul 2012	Timișoara, Romania	Challenger	Clay	(Romania) Andrei Dăescu	(Montenegro) Goran Tošić (United States) Denis Zivkovic	2–6, 5–7
Win	34–22	Jul 2012	Oberstaufen, Germany	Challenger	Clay	(Romania) Andrei Dăescu	(Russia) Andrey Kuznetsov (New Zealand) Rubin Statham	7–6^{(7–4)}, 7–6^{(7–1)}
Loss	34–23	Aug 2012	Cordenons, Italy	Challenger	Clay	(Germany) Philipp Marx	(Czech Republic) Lukáš Dlouhý (Slovakia) Michal Mertiňák	7–5, 5–7, [7–10]
Win	35–23	Aug 2012	Segovia, Spain	Challenger	Hard	(Italy) Stefano Ianni	(Russia) Konstantin Kravchuk (Austria) Nikolaus Moser	6–2, 6–3
Win	36–23	Sep 2012	Como, Italy	Challenger	Clay	(Germany) Philipp Marx	(Australia) Colin Ebelthite (Czech Republic) Jaroslav Pospíšil	6–4, 4–6, [10–4]
Win	37–23	Oct 2012	Rennes, France	Challenger	Hard (i)	(Germany) Philipp Marx	(Poland) Tomasz Bednarek (Poland) Mateusz Kowalczyk	6–3, 6–2
Loss	37–24	Nov 2012	Geneva, Switzerland	Challenger	Hard (i)	(Germany) Philipp Marx	(Sweden) Johan Brunström (South Africa) Raven Klaasen	6–7^{(2–7)}, 7–6^{(7–5)}, [5–10]
Loss	37–25	Nov 2012	Bratislava, Slovakia	Challenger	Hard (i)	(Germany) Philipp Marx	(Czech Republic) Lukáš Dlouhý (Russia) Mikhail Elgin	7–6^{(7–5)}, 2–6, [6–10]
Win	38–25	Jan 2013	Germany F2, Stuttgart	Futures	Hard (i)	(Germany) Philipp Marx	(Republic of Ireland) James Cluskey (Germany) Alexander Satschko	6–2, 6–2
Loss	38–26	Mar 2013	Cherbourg, France	Challenger	Hard (i)	(Germany) Philipp Marx	(Thailand) Sanchai Ratiwatana (Thailand) Sonchat Ratiwatana	5–7, 4–6
Loss	38–27	Mar 2013	Rimouski, Canada	Challenger	Hard (i)	(Germany) Philipp Marx	(Australia) Sam Groth (Australia) John-Patrick Smith	6–7^{(5–7)}, 6–7^{(7–9)}
Loss	38–28	Mar 2013	Le Gosier, Guadeloupe	Challenger	Hard	(Germany) Philipp Marx	(Israel) Dudi Sela (Chinese Taipei) Jimmy Wang	1–6, 2–6
Loss	38–29	May 2013	Rome, Italy	Challenger	Clay	(Germany) Philipp Marx	(Germany) Andre Begemann (Germany) Martin Emmrich	6–7^{(4–7)}, 3–6
Loss	38–30	Aug 2013	San Marino, San Marino	Challenger	Clay	(Italy) Daniele Bracciali	(United States) Nicholas Monroe (Germany) Simon Stadler	2–6, 4–6
Win	39–30	Oct 2013	Rennes, France (2)	Challenger	Hard (i)	(Austria) Oliver Marach	(United States) Nicholas Monroe (Germany) Simon Stadler	6–4, 3–6, [10–7]
Win	40–30	Nov 2013	Geneva, Switzerland	Challenger	Hard (i)	(Austria) Oliver Marach	(Czech Republic) František Čermák (Austria) Philipp Oswald	6–4, 6–3
Win	41–30	Aug 2017	Romania F9, Bucharest	Futures	Clay	(Romania) Adrian Barbu	(Bolivia) Hugo Dellien (Bolivia) Federico Zeballos	6–2, 4–6, [13–11]
Loss	41–31	Aug 2017	Romania F11, Chitila	Futures	Clay	(Romania) Adrian Barbu	(Argentina) Franco Agamenone (Romania) Patrick Grigoriu	6–2, 2–6, [8–10]
Win	42–31	Sep 2017	Romania F12, Brașov	Futures	Clay	(Romania) Adrian Barbu	(Romania) Vladimir Filip (Romania) Petru-Alexandru Luncanu	6–1, 6–4
Win	43–31	Aug 2019	Sopot, Poland	Challenger	Clay	(Germany) Andre Begemann	(Poland) Karol Drzewiecki (Poland) Mateusz Kowalczyk	6–1, 3–6, [10–8]
Win	44–31	Aug 2019	Meerbusch, Germany	Challenger	Clay	(Germany) Andre Begemann	(India) Sriram Balaji (India) Vishnu Vardhan	7–6^{(7–1)}, 6–7^{(4–7)}, [10–3]
Win	45–31	Sep 2019	Como, Italy (2)	Challenger	Clay	(Germany) Andre Begemann	(Brazil) Fabrício Neis (Portugal) Pedro Sousa	5–7, 7–5, [14–12]
Loss	45–32	Mar 2020	Pau, France	Challenger	Hard (i)	(Italy) Simone Bolelli	(France) Benjamin Bonzi (France) Antoine Hoang	3–6, 2–6

== Doubles performance timeline ==
Key
W	F	SF	QF	#R	RR	Q#	P#	DNQ	A	Z#	PO	G	S	B	NMS	NTI	P	NH

(W) winner; (F) finalist; (SF) semifinalist; (QF) quarterfinalist; (#R) rounds 4, 3, 2, 1; (RR) round-robin stage; (Q#) qualification round; (P#) preliminary round; (DNQ) did not qualify; (A) absent; (Z#) Davis/Fed Cup Zonal Group (with number indication) or (PO) play-off; (G) gold, (S) silver or (B) bronze Olympic/Paralympic medal; (NMS) not a Masters tournament; (NTI) not a Tier I tournament; (P) postponed; (NH) not held; (SR) strike rate (events won / competed); (W–L) win–loss record.
To avoid confusion and double counting, these charts are updated at the conclusion of a tournament or when the player's participation has ended.

Current through the 2021 Antalya Open.

Tournament	2003	2004	2005	2006	2007	2008	2009	2010	2011	2012	2013	2014	2015	2016	2017	2018	2019	2020	2021	SR	W–L
Grand Slam tournaments
Australian Open	A	A	A	A	A	A	A	A	A	A	A	2R	QF	3R	3R	1R	A	A	A	0 / 5	8–5
French Open	A	A	A	A	A	2R	A	A	A	A	2R	SF	3R	QF	1R	A	A	A		0 / 6	11–6
Wimbledon	A	A	A	A	A	Q1	A	A	A	A	1R	1R	SF	3R	3R	A	A	NH		0 / 5	8–5
US Open	A	A	A	A	A	A	A	A	A	A	1R	2R	QF	A	A	A	A	A		0 / 3	4–3
Win–loss	0–0	0–0	0–0	0–0	0–0	1–1	0–0	0–0	0–0	0–0	1–3	6–4	12–4	7–3	4–3	0–1	0–0	0–0	0–0	0 / 19	31–19
ATP World Tour Finals
ATP Finals	Did not qualify												F	Did not qualify						0 / 1	3–2
ATP World Tour Masters 1000
Indian Wells Masters	A	A	A	A	A	A	A	A	A	A	A	A	QF	1R	2R	A	A	NH		0 / 3	3–3
Miami Open	A	A	A	A	A	A	A	A	A	A	A	A	1R	1R	1R	A	A	NH		0 / 3	0–3
Monte-Carlo Masters	A	A	A	A	A	A	A	A	A	A	A	A	1R	QF	2R	A	A	NH		0 / 3	2–3
Madrid Open	A	A	A	A	A	A	A	A	A	A	A	A	W	F	1R	1R	A	NH		1 / 4	8–3
Italian Open	A	A	A	A	A	A	A	A	A	A	A	A	2R	SF	2R	A	A	A		0 / 3	4–3
Canadian Open	A	A	A	A	A	A	A	A	A	A	A	A	2R	SF	A	A	A	NH		0 / 2	2–2
Cincinnati Masters	A	A	A	A	A	A	A	A	A	A	A	A	2R	QF	A	A	A	A		0 / 2	1–2
Shanghai Masters	A	A	A	A	A	A	A	A	A	A	A	SF	A	A	A	A	A	NH		0 / 1	3–1
Paris Masters	A	A	A	A	A	A	A	A	A	A	A	1R	QF	A	A	A	A	A		0 / 2	1–2
Win–loss	0–0	0–0	0–0	0–0	0–0	0–0	0–0	0–0	0–0	0–0	0–0	3–2	10–7	8–7	3–5	0–1	0–0	0–0	0–0	0 / 22	24–22
National representation
Summer Olympics	NH	A	Not held			A	Not held			A	Not Held			F–S	Not Held					0 / 1	4–1
Davis Cup	PO	PO	A	A	1R	1R	A	A	A	Z1	Z1	Z1	Z1	Z1	A	Z2	Z2	P		0 / 2	11–4
Win–loss	1–0	0–1	0–0	0–0	1–1	0–1	0–0	0–0	0–0	1–1	1–0	1–0	1–1	6–1	0–0	3–0	1–0	0–0	0–0	0 / 2	13–5
Career statistics
Titles	0	0	0	0	0	0	0	0	0	0	1	2	2	1	1	0	0	0	0	7	
Finals	0	0	0	0	0	0	0	0	0	0	1	2	7	4	1	0	0	0	0	15	
Overall win–loss	1–1	0–2	0–0	0–0	2–2	1–5	0–0	0–0	0–1	2–3	12–13	32–24	48–25	24–22	15–16	4–8	1–1	0–0	1–1	0–0	
Year-end ranking	531	175	378	213	166	112	319	1,430	306	88	64	24	11	26	53	381	151	155		0%	

=== Mixed doubles ===
Current through the 2026 Wimbledon Championships.

Tournament	2005	2006	2007	2008	2009	2010	2011	2012	2013	2014	2015	2016	2017	2018	2019	2020	2021	2022	2023	2024	2025	2026	SR	W–L	Win %
Grand Slam tournaments
Australian Open	A										2R	A											0 / 1	1–1	50%
French Open	A										2R	2R	A										0 / 2	2–2	50%
Wimbledon	A									3R	2R	1R	A			NH	A						0 / 3	2–3	40%
US Open	A									1R	1R	A				NH	A						0 / 2	0–2	0%
Win–loss	0–0	0–0	0–0	0–0	0–0	0–0	0–0	0–0	0–0	2–2	2–4	1–2	0–0	0–0	0–0	0–0	0–0	0–0	0–0	0–0	0–0	0–0	0 / 8	5–8	38%
National representation
Olympic Games	NH			A	NH			A	NH			A (Note: Mergea and Monica Niculescu were entered in the 2016 Olympic mixed doubles event, but withdrew before their first match.)	NH			A (Note: The 2020 Summer Olympics were held in 2021 because of the COVID-19 pandemic.)		NH		A	NH		0 / 0	0–0	–
Career total	0–0	0–0	0–0	0–0	0–0	0–0	0–0	0–0	0–0	2–2	2–4	1–2	0–0	0–0	0–0	0–0	0–0	0–0	0–0	0–0	0–0	0–0	0 / 8	5–8	38%
