= 2015 Mutua Madrid Open – Men's doubles =

Men's doubles
- 2015 Mutua Madrid Open

Final
- Champions: (India) Rohan Bopanna (Romania) Florin Mergea
- Runners-up: (Poland) Marcin Matkowski (Serbia) Nenad Zimonjić
- Score: 6–2, 6–7^{(5–7)}, [11–9]

Events
Singles	men	women
Doubles	men	women
← 2014 ·	Mutua Madrid Open	· 2016 →

During the previous year’s edition of the tournament, Daniel Nestor of Canada and Nenad Zimonjić of Serbia won the men’s doubles competition. However, the duo broke up this year. Nestor played alongside Leander Paes, but lost to Feliciano López and Max Mirnyi in the second round. Zimonjić partnered up with Marcin Matkowski, but lost in the final to Rohan Bopanna and Florin Mergea, 2–6, 7–6^{(7–5)}, [9–11].

== Seeds ==
All seeds receive a bye into the second round.

1. (United States) Bob Bryan / (United States) Mike Bryan (second round)
2. (Croatia) Ivan Dodig / (Brazil) Marcelo Melo (second round)
3. (Canada) Vasek Pospisil / (United States) Jack Sock (quarterfinals, retired)
4. (Netherlands) Jean-Julien Rojer / (Romania) Horia Tecău (second round)
5. (Poland) Marcin Matkowski / (Serbia) Nenad Zimonjić (final)
6. (Spain) Marcel Granollers / (Spain) Marc López (semifinals)
7. (Canada) Daniel Nestor / (India) Leander Paes (second round)
8. (France) Nicolas Mahut / (France) Édouard Roger-Vasselin (second round)

== Draw ==
=== Key ===
- Q = Qualifier
- WC = Wild card
- LL = Lucky loser
- Alt = Alternate
- SE = Special exempt
- PR = Protected ranking
- ITF = ITF entry
- JE = Junior exempt
- w/o = Walkover
- r = Retired
- d = Defaulted
- SR = Special ranking

=== Finals ===
Semifinals
(India) Rohan Bopanna (Romania) Florin Mergea	6^{4}	6	[11]
6	(Spain) Marcel Granollers (Spain) Marc López	7^{7}	3	[9]
5	(Poland) Marcin Matkowski (Serbia) Nenad Zimonjić	6	6^{5}	[10]
WC	(Spain) Feliciano López (Belarus) Max Mirnyi	3	7^{7}	[7]

Final
(India) Rohan Bopanna (Romania) Florin Mergea	6	6^{5}	[11]
5	(Poland) Marcin Matkowski (Serbia) Nenad Zimonjić	2	7^{7}	[9]

=== Top half ===
First round
(Colombia) JS Cabal (France) A Mannarino	6	1	[12]
(Italy) S Bolelli (Italy) F Fognini	4	6	[10]
(India) R Bopanna (Romania) F Mergea	5	7^{7}	[10]
(Croatia) M Draganja (Finland) H Kontinen	7	6^{5}	[6]
(South Africa) K Anderson (France) J Chardy	7	6
WC	(India) M Bhupathi (Australia) N Kyrgios	5	3
Alt	(United States) S Johnson (United States) S Querrey	6	3	[15]
(Uruguay) P Cuevas (Spain) D Marrero	3	6	[17]

Second round
1	(United States) B Bryan (United States) M Bryan	6^{4}	5
(Colombia) JS Cabal (France) A Mannarino	7^{7}	7
(India) R Bopanna (Romania) F Mergea	6	4	[10]
8	(France) N Mahut (France) É Roger-Vasselin	4	6	[5]
3	(Canada) V Pospisil (United States) J Sock	6^{4}	6	[10]
(South Africa) K Anderson (France) J Chardy	7^{7}	1	[4]
(Uruguay) P Cuevas (Spain) D Marrero	4	4
6	(Spain) M Granollers (Spain) M López	6	6

Quarterfinals
(Colombia) JS Cabal (France) A Mannarino	3	2
(India) R Bopanna (Romania) F Mergea	6	6
3	(Canada) V Pospisil (United States) J Sock	6	1^{r}
6	(Spain) M Granollers (Spain) M López	2	0

Semifinals
(India) R Bopanna (Romania) F Mergea	6^{4}	6	[11]
6	(Spain) M Granollers (Spain) M López	7^{7}	3	[9]

=== Bottom half ===
First round
(France) G Monfils (France) J-W Tsonga	6	4	[3]
(Bulgaria) G Dimitrov (Austria) J Melzer	4	6	[10]
(Colombia) S Giraldo (United States) S Lipsky	4	2
(Croatia) M Čilić (Serbia) V Troicki	6	6
(Austria) A Peya (Brazil) B Soares	4	5
WC	(Spain) F López (Belarus) M Mirnyi	6	7
(United Kingdom) J Murray (Australia) J Peers	6	6
(Argentina) L Mayer (Argentina) J Mónaco	2	3

Second round
5	(Poland) M Matkowski (Serbia) N Zimonjić	6	7^{9}
(Bulgaria) G Dimitrov (Austria) J Melzer	3	6^{7}
(Croatia) M Čilić (Serbia) V Troicki	6	2	[10]
4	(Netherlands) J-J Rojer (Romania) H Tecău	4	6	[7]
7	(Canada) D Nestor (India) L Paes	6^{4}	3
WC	(Spain) F López (Belarus) M Mirnyi	7^{7}	6
(United Kingdom) J Murray (Australia) J Peers	7^{8}	6
2	(Croatia) I Dodig (Brazil) M Melo	6^{6}	2

Quarterfinals
5	(Poland) M Matkowski (Serbia) N Zimonjić	6	6^{4}	[13]
(Croatia) M Čilić (Serbia) V Troicki	4	7^{7}	[11]
WC	(Spain) F López (Belarus) M Mirnyi	6	6^{1}	[10]
(United Kingdom) J Murray (Australia) J Peers	4	7^{7}	[4]

Semifinals
5	(Poland) M Matkowski (Serbia) N Zimonjić	6	6^{5}	[10]
WC	(Spain) F López (Belarus) M Mirnyi	3	7^{7}	[7]
