= 2021 Stockholm Open – Singles =

Singles
- 2021 Stockholm Open

Final
- Champion: (United States) Tommy Paul
- Runner-up: (Canada) Denis Shapovalov
- Score: 6–4, 2–6, 6–4

Details
- Draw: 28
- Seeds: 8

Events
Singles	Doubles
- Stockholm Open

Tommy Paul defeated defending champion Denis Shapovalov in the final, 6–4, 2–6, 6–4, to win the singles tennis title at the 2021 Stockholm Open. It was Paul's first ATP Tour title. Paul was the first American to win the title since James Blake in 2006.

== Seeds ==
The top four seeds receive a bye into the second round.

1. (Italy) Jannik Sinner (second round)
2. (Canada) Félix Auger-Aliassime (semifinals)
3. (Canada) Denis Shapovalov (final)
4. (United Kingdom) Dan Evans (quarterfinals)
5. (United States) Taylor Fritz (second round)
6. (Kazakhstan) Alexander Bublik (first round, retired)
7. (Hungary) Márton Fucsovics (second round)
8. (United States) Frances Tiafoe (semifinals)

== Draw ==
Key

- Q = Qualifier
- WC = Wild card
- LL = Lucky loser
- Alt = Alternate
- ITF = ITF entry
- PR = Protected ranking
- SR = Special ranking
- SE = Special exempt
- JE = Junior exempt
- JR = Junior Accelerator Programme entrant
- CO = College Accelerator Programme entrant
- NG = Next Gen Accelerator Program entrant
- w/o = Walkover
- r = Retired
- d = Defaulted

=== Finals ===
Semifinals
(United States) Tommy Paul	5	7^{7}	6
8	(United States) Frances Tiafoe	7	6^{5}	4
3	(Canada) Denis Shapovalov	6	7
2	(Canada) Félix Auger-Aliassime	4	5

Final
(United States) Tommy Paul	6	2	6
3	(Canada) Denis Shapovalov	4	6	4

=== Top half ===
First round
WC	(United Kingdom) A Murray	6	7^{9}
Q	(Norway) V Durasovic	1	6^{7}
WC	(Sweden) L Borg	4	2
(United States) T Paul	6	6
LL	(Belarus) E Gerasimov	4	4
5	(United States) T Fritz	6	6
(Spain) A Davidovich Fokina	6	3	7
(United States) M McDonald	2	6	5
(Spain) P Martínez	6	3	7^{7}
(Finland) E Ruusuvuori	4	6	6^{4}
WC	(Sweden) E Ymer	4	6^{2}
8	(United States) F Tiafoe	6	7^{7}

Second round
1	(Italy) J Sinner	6^{4}	3
WC	(United Kingdom) A Murray	7^{7}	6
(United States) T Paul	6	6
5	(United States) T Fritz	4	4
4	(United Kingdom) D Evans	7^{7}	6
(Spain) A Davidovich Fokina	6^{5}	2
(Spain) P Martínez	4	4
8	(United States) F Tiafoe	6	6

Quarterfinals
WC	(United Kingdom) A Murray	2	6	3
(United States) T Paul	6	3	6
4	(United Kingdom) D Evans	6	1	1
8	(United States) F Tiafoe	1	6	6

Semifinals
(United States) T Paul	5	7^{7}	6
8	(United States) F Tiafoe	7	6^{5}	4

=== Bottom half ===
First round
6	(Kazakhstan) A Bublik	1	0^{r}
(France) A Rinderknech	6	2
(Germany) P Gojowczyk	7^{7}	4	5
LL	(Slovakia) J Kovalík	6^{5}	6	7
Q	(Italy) A Vavassori	6	6
Q	(Russia) P Kotov	3	4
7	(Hungary) M Fucsovics	6	6
(France) A Mannarino	4	0
(Netherlands) B van de Zandschulp	7^{7}	7^{7}
LL	(Croatia) N Serdarušić	6^{5}	6^{5}
Q	(Uzbekistan) D Istomin	4	2
(Serbia) F Krajinović	6	6

Second round
(France) A Rinderknech	6	6
LL	(Slovakia) J Kovalík	4	1
Q	(Italy) A Vavassori	6^{1}	1
3	(Canada) D Shapovalov	7^{7}	6
7	(Hungary) M Fucsovics	6^{3}	6	5
(Netherlands) B van de Zandschulp	7^{7}	3	7
(Serbia) F Krajinović	3	4
2	(Canada) F Auger-Aliassime	6	6

Quarterfinals
(France) A Rinderknech	6	3	5
3	(Canada) D Shapovalov	4	6	7
(Netherlands) B van de Zandschulp	4	3
2	(Canada) F Auger-Aliassime	6	6

Semifinals
3	(Canada) D Shapovalov	6	7
2	(Canada) F Auger-Aliassime	4	5

== Qualifying ==
=== Seeds ===
1. (Belarus) Egor Gerasimov (qualifying competition, lucky loser)
2. (Slovakia) Jozef Kovalík (qualifying competition, lucky loser)
3. (Serbia) Nikola Milojević (first round)
4. (Egypt) Mohamed Safwat (first round)
5. (Croatia) Nino Serdarušić (qualifying competition, lucky loser)
6. (Uzbekistan) Denis Istomin (qualified)
7. (Russia) Teymuraz Gabashvili (first round)
8. (Russia) Pavel Kotov (qualified)

=== Qualifiers ===
1. (Russia) Pavel Kotov
2. (Uzbekistan) Denis Istomin
3. (Italy) Andrea Vavassori
4. (Norway) Viktor Durasovic

=== Lucky losers ===
1. (Belarus) Egor Gerasimov
2. (Slovakia) Jozef Kovalík
3. (Croatia) Nino Serdarušić

=== Qualifying draw ===
==== First qualifier ====
First round
1	(Belarus) Egor Gerasimov	3	6	7
(France) Matteo Martineau	6	4	5
(Italy) Raúl Brancaccio	4	4
8	(Russia) Pavel Kotov	6	6

Qualifying competition
1	(Belarus) Egor Gerasimov	6^{4}	3
8	(Russia) Pavel Kotov	7^{7}	6

==== Second qualifier ====
First round
2	(Slovakia) Jozef Kovalík	7^{7}	7^{8}
(Serbia) Danilo Petrović	6^{2}	6^{6}
WC	(Sweden) Jonathan Mridha	6	3	4
6	(Uzbekistan) Denis Istomin	2	6	6

Qualifying competition
2	(Slovakia) Jozef Kovalík	4	5
6	(Uzbekistan) Denis Istomin	6	7

==== Third qualifier ====
First round
3	(Serbia) Nikola Milojević	7^{7}	4	6^{7}
(Italy) Andrea Vavassori	6^{4}	6	7^{9}
WC	(Sweden) Simon Freund	1	7^{7}	3
5	(Croatia) Nino Serdarušić	6	6^{1}	6

Qualifying competition
(Italy) Andrea Vavassori	3	6	6
5	(Croatia) Nino Serdarušić	6	3	4

==== Fourth qualifier ====
First round
4	(Egypt) Mohamed Safwat	4	6^{4}
(Spain) Adrián Menéndez Maceiras	6	7^{7}
(Norway) Viktor Durasovic	6	3	6
7	(Russia) Teymuraz Gabashvili	4	6	3

Qualifying competition
(Spain) Adrián Menéndez Maceiras	3	2
(Norway) Viktor Durasovic	6	6
