= 2021 Stockholm Open – Doubles =

Doubles
- 2021 Stockholm Open

Final
- Champions: (Mexico) Santiago González (Argentina) Andrés Molteni
- Runners-up: (Pakistan) Aisam-ul-Haq Qureshi (Netherlands) Jean-Julien Rojer
- Score: 6–2, 6–2

Events
Singles	Doubles
- Stockholm Open

Henri Kontinen and Édouard Roger-Vasselin were the defending champions, but chose not to participate.

Santiago González and Andrés Molteni won the title, defeating Aisam-ul-Haq Qureshi and Jean-Julien Rojer in the final, 6–2, 6–2.

== Seeds ==
1. (Croatia) Ivan Dodig / (Brazil) Marcelo Melo (first round)
2. (Germany) Tim Pütz / (New Zealand) Michael Venus (withdrew)
3. (United Kingdom) Ken Skupski / (United Kingdom) Neal Skupski (first round)
4. (Kazakhstan) Alexander Bublik / (Kazakhstan) Andrey Golubev (first round)

== Draw ==
Key

- Q = Qualifier
- WC = Wild card
- LL = Lucky loser
- Alt = Alternate
- ITF = ITF entry
- PR = Protected ranking
- SR = Special ranking
- SE = Special exempt
- JE = Junior exempt
- JR = Junior Accelerator Programme entrant
- CO = College Accelerator Programme entrant
- NG = Next Gen Accelerator Program entrant
- w/o = Walkover
- r = Retired
- d = Defaulted

=== Draw ===
First round
1	(Croatia) I Dodig (Brazil) M Melo	7^{7}	5	[7]
(Mexico) S González (Argentina) A Molteni	6^{5}	7	[10]
Alt	(Sweden) K Friberg (Egypt) M Safwat	1	6	[6]
WC	(Sweden) A Göransson (Sweden) R Lindstedt	6	3	[10]
4	(Kazakhstan) A Bublik (Kazakhstan) A Golubev	3	1
(Bosnia and Herzegovina) T Brkić (Serbia) N Ćaćić	6	6
(United States) T Fritz (United States) T Paul	6	4	[8]
(Finland) E Ruusuvuori (Netherlands) B van de Zandschulp	4	6	[10]
(Pakistan) A-u-H Qureshi (Netherlands) J-J Rojer	6	6
(France) F Martin (Monaco) H Nys	4	4
(Uruguay) A Behar (Ecuador) G Escobar	7^{7}	6
3	(United Kingdom) K Skupski (United Kingdom) N Skupski	6^{3}	3
WC	(Sweden) M Eriksson (Sweden) E Ymer	2	6	[10]
(Netherlands) M Middelkoop (Germany) A Mies	6	4	[5]
(Spain) P Martínez (Italy) A Vavassori	6	6
Alt	(Sweden) S Freund (Croatia) N Serdarušić	4	4

Quarterfinals
(Mexico) S González (Argentina) A Molteni	6	6
WC	(Sweden) A Göransson (Sweden) R Lindstedt	3	4
(Bosnia and Herzegovina) T Brkić (Serbia) N Ćaćić	6	6^{4}	[8]
(Finland) E Ruusuvuori (Netherlands) B van de Zandschulp	3	7^{7}	[10]
(Pakistan) A-u-H Qureshi (Netherlands) J-J Rojer	6	6
(Uruguay) A Behar (Ecuador) G Escobar	3	2
WC	(Sweden) M Eriksson (Sweden) E Ymer	6	6
(Spain) P Martínez (Italy) A Vavassori	3	3

Semifinals
(Mexico) S González (Argentina) A Molteni	7^{7}	6
(Finland) E Ruusuvuori (Netherlands) B van de Zandschulp	6^{2}	2
(Pakistan) A-u-H Qureshi (Netherlands) J-J Rojer	6	6
WC	(Sweden) M Eriksson (Sweden) E Ymer	3	2

Final
(Mexico) S González (Argentina) A Molteni	6	6
(Pakistan) A-u-H Qureshi (Netherlands) J-J Rojer	2	2
