= 2016 Mutua Madrid Open – Men's doubles =

Men's doubles
- 2016 Mutua Madrid Open

Final
- Champions: (Netherlands) Jean-Julien Rojer (Romania) Horia Tecău
- Runners-up: (India) Rohan Bopanna (Romania) Florin Mergea
- Score: 6–4, 7–6^{(7–5)}

Events
Singles	men	women
Doubles	men	women
← 2015 ·	Mutua Madrid Open	· 2017 →

Rohan Bopanna and Florin Mergea were the defending champions, but lost to Jean-Julien Rojer and Horia Tecău in the final, 4–6, 6–7^{(5–7)}.

== Seeds ==
All seeds receive a bye into the second round.

1. (France) Pierre-Hugues Herbert / (France) Nicolas Mahut (semifinals)
2. (United Kingdom) Jamie Murray / (Brazil) Bruno Soares (second round)
3. (Netherlands) Jean-Julien Rojer / (Romania) Horia Tecău (champions)
4. (Croatia) Ivan Dodig / (Brazil) Marcelo Melo (semifinals)
5. (United States) Bob Bryan / (United States) Mike Bryan (quarterfinals)
6. (India) Rohan Bopanna / (Romania) Florin Mergea (final)
7. (Austria) Alexander Peya / (Serbia) Nenad Zimonjić (quarterfinals)
8. (Canada) Vasek Pospisil / (United States) Jack Sock (quarterfinals)

== Draw ==
=== Key ===
- Q = Qualifier
- WC = Wild card
- LL = Lucky loser
- Alt = Alternate
- SE = Special exempt
- PR = Protected ranking
- ITF = ITF entry
- JE = Junior exempt
- w/o = Walkover
- r = Retired
- d = Defaulted
- SR = Special ranking

=== Finals ===
Semifinals
1	(France) Pierre-Hugues Herbert (France) Nicolas Mahut	2	6^{3}
3	(Netherlands) Jean-Julien Rojer (Romania) Horia Tecău	6	7^{7}
4	(Croatia) Ivan Dodig (Brazil) Marcelo Melo	5	7^{7}	[10]
6	(India) Rohan Bopanna (Romania) Florin Mergea	7	6^{4}	[12]

Final
3	(Netherlands) Jean-Julien Rojer (Romania) Horia Tecău	6	7^{7}
6	(India) Rohan Bopanna (Romania) Florin Mergea	4	6^{5}

=== Top half ===
First round
WC	(Spain) P Carreño Busta (Spain) F Verdasco	6	6
(South Africa) K Anderson (France) J Chardy	4	4
(Italy) F Fognini (Serbia) V Troicki	1	7	[9]
(Poland) Ł Kubot (Poland) M Matkowski	6	5	[11]
(Brazil) T Bellucci (Argentina) L Mayer	6^{3}	7^{7}	[10]
(Colombia) JS Cabal (Colombia) R Farah	7^{7}	6^{3}	[7]
WC	(India) M Bhupathi (France) F Martin	6^{3}	7	[10]
(Argentina) G Pella (France) G Simon	7^{7}	5	[7]

Second round
1	(France) P-H Herbert (France) N Mahut	6	7^{7}
WC	(Spain) P Carreño Busta (Spain) F Verdasco	3	6^{4}
(Poland) Ł Kubot (Poland) M Matkowski	5	6	[8]
5	(United States) B Bryan (United States) M Bryan	7	2	[10]
3	(Netherlands) J-J Rojer (Romania) H Tecău	6	6
(Brazil) T Bellucci (Argentina) L Mayer	4	4
WC	(India) M Bhupathi (France) F Martin	3	6	[6]
7	(Austria) A Peya (Serbia) N Zimonjić	6	4	[10]

Quarterfinals
1	(France) P-H Herbert (France) N Mahut	3	7^{7}	[10]
5	(United States) B Bryan (United States) M Bryan	6	6^{4}	[8]
3	(Netherlands) J-J Rojer (Romania) H Tecău	7^{7}	7^{7}
7	(Austria) A Peya (Serbia) N Zimonjić	6^{5}	6^{2}

Semifinals
1	(France) P-H Herbert (France) N Mahut	2	6^{3}
3	(Netherlands) J-J Rojer (Romania) H Tecău	6	7^{7}

=== Bottom half ===
First round
(Philippines) T Huey (Belarus) M Mirnyi	6	6
(Canada) D Nestor (Czech Republic) R Štěpánek	4	4
(South Africa) R Klaasen (United States) R Ram	6	6^{6}	[10]
(Spain) F López (Spain) M López	4	7^{8}	[5]
(Uruguay) P Cuevas (Spain) M Granollers	6	6
(United States) S Johnson (United States) S Querrey	4	2
(Finland) H Kontinen (Australia) J Peers	6	3	[10]
(Ukraine) A Dolgopolov (Australia) B Tomic	3	6	[3]

Second round
8	(Canada) V Pospisil (United States) J Sock	4	7^{7}	[10]
(Philippines) T Huey (Belarus) M Mirnyi	6	6^{4}	[4]
(South Africa) R Klaasen (United States) R Ram	7	3	[8]
4	(Croatia) I Dodig (Brazil) M Melo	5	6	[10]
6	(India) R Bopanna (Romania) F Mergea	6^{4}	6	[10]
(Uruguay) P Cuevas (Spain) M Granollers	7^{7}	4	[4]
(Finland) H Kontinen (Australia) J Peers	6	7^{7}
2	(United Kingdom) J Murray (Brazil) B Soares	4	6^{4}

Quarterfinals
8	(Canada) V Pospisil (United States) J Sock	3	4
4	(Croatia) I Dodig (Brazil) M Melo	6	6
6	(India) R Bopanna (Romania) F Mergea	3	6	[10]
(Finland) H Kontinen (Australia) J Peers	6	3	[6]

Semifinals
4	(Croatia) I Dodig (Brazil) M Melo	5	7^{7}	[10]
6	(India) R Bopanna (Romania) F Mergea	7	6^{4}	[12]
