= 2016 Western & Southern Open – Men's doubles =

Men's doubles
- 2016 Western & Southern Open

Final
- Champions: (Croatia) Ivan Dodig (Brazil) Marcelo Melo
- Runners-up: (Netherlands) Jean-Julien Rojer (Romania) Horia Tecău
- Score: 7–6^{(7–5)}, 6–7^{(5–7)}, [10–6]

Events
Singles	men	women
Doubles	men	women
← 2015 ·	Western & Southern Open	· 2017 →

Daniel Nestor and Édouard Roger-Vasselin were the defending champions, but chose not to compete together. Nestor played alongside Vasek Pospisil, but lost in the semifinals to Ivan Dodig and Marcelo Melo. Roger-Vasselin teamed up with Julien Benneteau, but lost in the first round to Milos Raonic and Nenad Zimonjić.

Dodig and Melo won the title, defeating Jean-Julien Rojer and Horia Tecău in the final, 7–6^{(7–5)}, 6–7^{(5–7)}, [10–6].

== Seeds ==
All seeds received a bye into the second round.

1. (France) Pierre-Hugues Herbert / (France) Nicolas Mahut (quarterfinals)
2. (United States) Bob Bryan / (United States) Mike Bryan (semifinals)
3. (United Kingdom) Jamie Murray / (Brazil) Bruno Soares (quarterfinals)
4. (Croatia) Ivan Dodig / (Brazil) Marcelo Melo (champions)
5. (Netherlands) Jean-Julien Rojer / (Romania) Horia Tecău (final)
6. (Canada) Daniel Nestor / (Canada) Vasek Pospisil (semifinals)
7. (India) Rohan Bopanna / (Romania) Florin Mergea (second round)
8. (South Africa) Raven Klaasen / (United States) Rajeev Ram (quarterfinals)

== Draw ==
=== Key ===
- Q = Qualifier
- WC = Wild card
- LL = Lucky loser
- Alt = Alternate
- SE = Special exempt
- PR = Protected ranking
- ITF = ITF entry
- JE = Junior exempt
- w/o = Walkover
- r = Retired
- d = Defaulted
- SR = Special ranking

=== Finals ===
Semifinals
6	(Canada) Daniel Nestor (Canada) Vasek Pospisil	4	1
4	(Croatia) Ivan Dodig (Brazil) Marcelo Melo	6	6
5	(Netherlands) Jean-Julien Rojer (Romania) Horia Tecău	6	7^{7}
2	(United States) Bob Bryan (United States) Mike Bryan	3	6^{5}

Final
4	(Croatia) Ivan Dodig (Brazil) Marcelo Melo	7^{7}	6^{5}	[10]
5	(Netherlands) Jean-Julien Rojer (Romania) Horia Tecău	6^{5}	7^{7}	[6]

=== Top half ===
First round
WC	(United States) B Baker (United States) R Harrison	6	7^{7}
(Spain) F López (Spain) M López	3	6^{4}
WC	(United States) E Butorac (United States) T Fritz	w/o
(Bulgaria) G Dimitrov (Switzerland) S Wawrinka
(United States) S Johnson (United States) S Querrey
(Australia) B Tomic (Serbia) V Troicki	w/o
(Canada) M Raonic (Serbia) N Zimonjić	4	7	[10]
(France) J Benneteau (France) É Roger-Vasselin	6	5	[3]

Second round
1	(France) P-H Herbert (France) N Mahut	6	6^{2}	[10]
WC	(United States) B Baker (United States) R Harrison	4	7^{7}	[2]
WC	(United States) E Butorac (United States) T Fritz	7^{7}	4	[5]
6	(Canada) D Nestor (Canada) V Pospisil	6^{2}	6	[10]
4	(Croatia) I Dodig (Brazil) M Melo	6	7
(Australia) B Tomic (Serbia) V Troicki	3	5
(Canada) M Raonic (Serbia) N Zimonjić
8	(South Africa) R Klaasen (United States) R Ram	w/o

Quarterfinals
1	(France) P-H Herbert (France) N Mahut	6	4	[6]
6	(Canada) D Nestor (Canada) V Pospisil	4	6	[10]
4	(Croatia) I Dodig (Brazil) M Melo	7^{10}	7
8	(South Africa) R Klaasen (United States) R Ram	6^{8}	5

Semifinals
6	(Canada) D Nestor (Canada) V Pospisil	4	1
4	(Croatia) I Dodig (Brazil) M Melo	6	6

=== Bottom half ===
First round
(France) R Gasquet (France) G Simon	6	3	[11]
(United Kingdom) D Inglot (Poland) M Matkowski	4	6	[13]
(Uruguay) P Cuevas (Spain) M Granollers	6	6
(Poland) Ł Kubot (Austria) A Peya	2	4
(France) J Chardy (Belgium) D Goffin	3	6	[8]
(Philippines) T Huey (Belarus) M Mirnyi	6	3	[10]
(France) L Pouille (France) J-W Tsonga	7^{7}	7^{7}
(Finland) H Kontinen (Australia) J Peers	6^{5}	6^{4}

Second round
5	(Netherlands) J-J Rojer (Romania) H Tecău	6	4	[10]
(United Kingdom) D Inglot (Poland) M Matkowski	3	6	[8]
(Uruguay) P Cuevas (Spain) M Granollers	3	4
3	(United Kingdom) J Murray (Brazil) B Soares	6	6
7	(India) R Bopanna (Romania) F Mergea	6^{3}	4
(Philippines) T Huey (Belarus) M Mirnyi	7^{7}	6
(France) L Pouille (France) J-W Tsonga	2	5
2	(United States) B Bryan (United States) M Bryan	6	7

Quarterfinals
5	(Netherlands) J-J Rojer (Romania) H Tecău	4	6	[11]
3	(United Kingdom) J Murray (Brazil) B Soares	6	2	[9]
(Philippines) T Huey (Belarus) M Mirnyi	4	6^{5}
2	(United States) B Bryan (United States) M Bryan	6	7^{7}

Semifinals
5	(Netherlands) J-J Rojer (Romania) H Tecău	6	7^{7}
2	(United States) B Bryan (United States) M Bryan	3	6^{5}
