= Jean-Julien Rojer =

Dutch tennis player (born 1981)

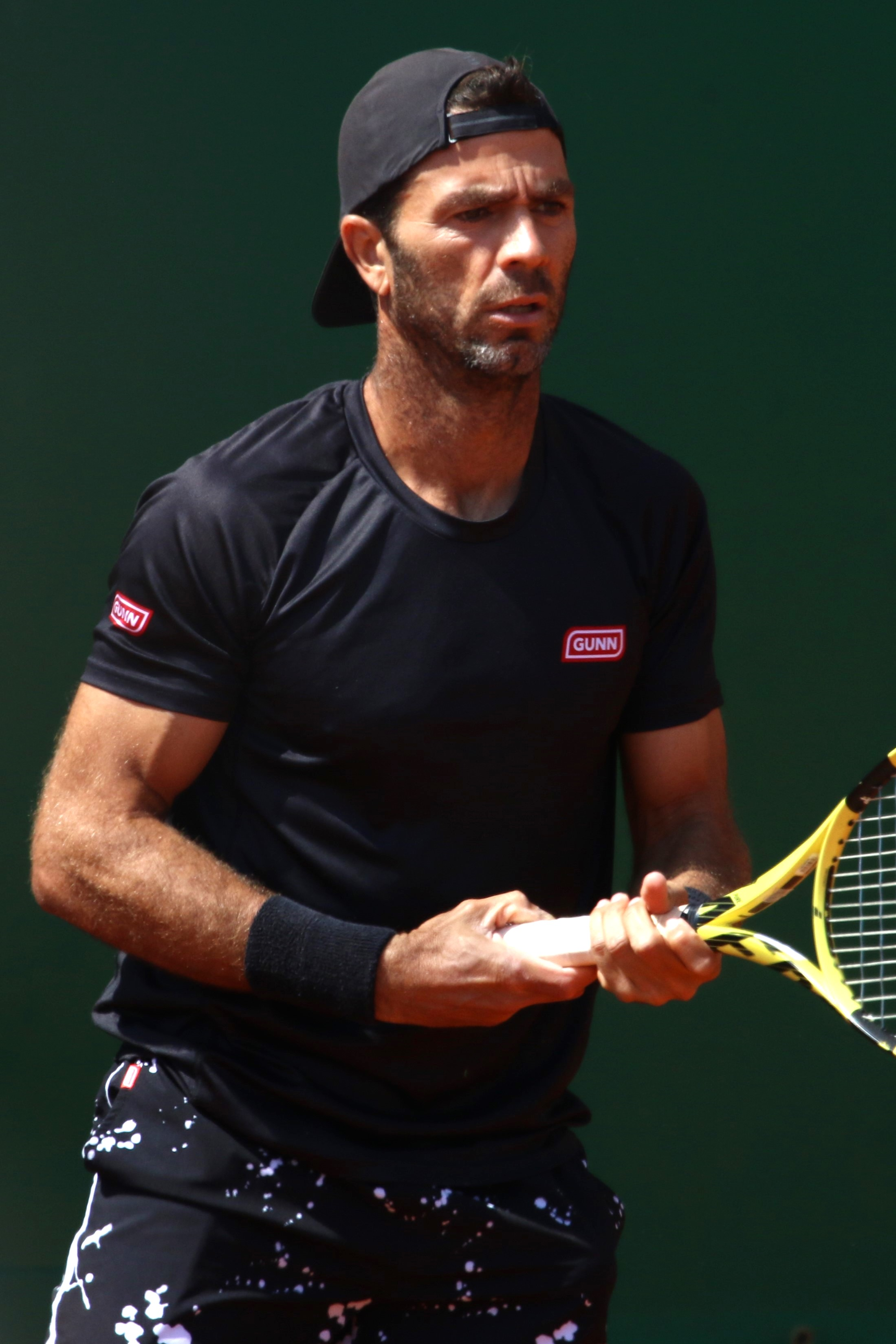
- Rojer at the 2023 Monte-Carlo Masters
- Country (sports): Netherlands Antilles (2002–2010); Curaçao (2010–2012); Netherlands (2012–present)
- Residence: Dubai, United Arab Emirates
- Born: 25 August 1981 (age 44) Willemstad, Netherlands Antilles
- Height: 1.85 m (6 ft 1 in)
- Turned pro: 2003
- Plays: Right-handed (two-handed backhand)
- College: UCLA
- Prize money: US $ 7,364,425

Singles
- Career record: 13–1
- Career titles: 0
- Highest ranking: No. 218 (15 August 2005)

Doubles
- Career record: 542–409
- Career titles: 37
- Highest ranking: No. 3 (23 November 2015)
- Current ranking: No. 77 (16 June 2025)

Grand Slam doubles results
- Australian Open: SF (2011, 2015)
- French Open: W (2022)
- Wimbledon: W (2015)
- US Open: W (2017)

Other doubles tournaments
- Tour Finals: W (2015)
- Olympic Games: 2R (2021, 2024)

Mixed doubles
- Career titles: 1

Grand Slam mixed doubles results
- Australian Open: 2R (2016, 2017, 2018, 2019, 2020, 2024)
- French Open: W (2014)
- Wimbledon: SF (2013)
- US Open: QF (2012, 2023)
- Last updated on: 16 June 2025.

Jean-Julien Rojer (/dʒɒn ˈdʒuːliən ˈroʊʒɛər/ "John Julian" ROH-zhair, Dutch: [ˌʑɑ̃ːʑyˈljɛ̃ː ˈroːi.ər]; born 25 August 1981) is a Dutch professional tennis player from Curaçao, who specializes in doubles. He reached his career-high doubles ranking of world No. 3 in November 2015.

He is a four-time Grand Slam champion, having won 2015 Wimbledon and 2017 US Open with Horia Tecău, the 2022 French Open with Marcelo Arévalo in men's doubles, as well as the 2014 French Open in mixed doubles alongside Anna-Lena Grönefeld. By winning the 2022 French Open, Rojer became the oldest major men's doubles champion in the Open Era. He has won 37 doubles titles on the ATP Tour, including the 2015 ATP World Tour Finals and four at Masters 1000 level. He recorded 500 wins in August 2023 at the Canadian Open.

He attended UCLA where he competed for the UCLA Bruins men's tennis team. Since 2012, Rojer has represented the Netherlands in the Davis Cup, having previously represented the Netherlands Antilles from 1999 to 2010. He has also competed at the Summer Olympic Games on three occasions.

== World TeamTennis ==
Rojer has played four seasons with World TeamTennis, making his debut in 2011 with the St. Louis Aces and earning the 2011 WTT Male Rookie of the Year award. He has since played for the Springfield Lasers in 2013, earning the 2013 WTT Male MVP award, and another two seasons in 2017 and 2019. It was announced he will be joining the Springfield Lasers during the 2020 WTT season set to begin July 12.

== Significant finals ==
=== Grand Slam finals ===
==== Doubles: 3 (3 titles) ====
Result	Year	Championship	Surface	Partner	Opponents	Score
Win	2015	Wimbledon	Grass	(Romania) Horia Tecău	(United Kingdom) Jamie Murray (Australia) John Peers	7–6^{(7–5)}, 6–4, 6–4
Win	2017	US Open	Hard	(Romania) Horia Tecău	(Spain) Feliciano López (Spain) Marc López	6–4, 6–3
Win	2022	French Open	Clay	(El Salvador) Marcelo Arévalo	(Croatia) Ivan Dodig (United States) Austin Krajicek	6–7^{(4–7)}, 7–6^{(7–5)}, 6–3

==== Mixed doubles: 1 (1 title) ====
Result	Year	Championship	Surface	Partner	Opponents	Score
Win	2014	French Open	Clay	(Germany) Anna-Lena Grönefeld	(Germany) Julia Görges (Serbia) Nenad Zimonjić	4–6, 6–2, [10–7]

=== Year-end championships ===
==== Doubles: 1 (1 title) ====
Result	Year	Championship	Surface	Partner	Opponents	Score
Win	2015	London	Hard (i)	(Romania) Horia Tecău	(India) Rohan Bopanna (Romania) Florin Mergea	6–4, 6–3

=== Masters 1000 finals ===
==== Doubles: 7 (4 titles, 3 runners-up) ====
Result	Year	Tournaments	Surface	Partner	Opponents	Score
Loss	2012	Paris Masters	Hard (i)	(Pakistan) Aisam-ul-Haq Qureshi	(India) Mahesh Bhupathi (India) Rohan Bopanna	6–7^{(6–8)}, 3–6
Win	2013	Miami Open	Hard	(Pakistan) Aisam-ul-Haq Qureshi	(Poland) Mariusz Fyrstenberg (Poland) Marcin Matkowski	6–4, 6–1
Win	2016	Madrid Open	Clay	(Romania) Horia Tecău	(India) Rohan Bopanna (Romania) Florin Mergea	6–4, 7–6 ^{(7–5)}
Loss	2016	Cincinnati Masters	Hard	(Romania) Horia Tecău	(Croatia) Ivan Dodig (Brazil) Marcelo Melo	6–7^{(5–7)}, 7–6^{(7–5)}, [6–10]
Loss	2018	Paris Masters	Hard (i)	(Romania) Horia Tecău	(Spain) Marcel Granollers (United States) Rajeev Ram	4–6, 4–6
Win	2019	Madrid Open	Clay	(Romania) Horia Tecău	(Argentina) Diego Schwartzman (Austria) Dominic Thiem	6–2, 6–3
Win	2023	Canadian Open	Hard	(El Salvador) Marcelo Arévalo	(United States) Rajeev Ram (United Kingdom) Joe Salisbury	6–3, 6–1

== ATP career finals ==
=== Doubles: 61 (37 titles, 24 runner-ups) ===
Legend Grand Slam tournaments (3–0) ATP World Tour Finals (1–0) ATP World Tour Masters 1000 (4–3) ATP World Tour 500 Series (8–7) ATP World Tour 250 Series (21–14)	Finals by surface Hard (25–15) Clay (9–8) Grass (3–1)	Finals by setting Outdoor (27–13) Indoor (10–10)

Result	W–L	Date	Tournament	Tier	Surface	Partner	Opponents	Score
Loss	0–1	Jul 2008	Swedish Open, Sweden	International	Clay	(Sweden) Johan Brunström	(Sweden) Jonas Björkman (Sweden) Robin Söderling	2–6, 2–6
Loss	0–2	May 2009	Serbia Open, Serbia	250 Series	Clay	(Sweden) Johan Brunström	(Poland) Łukasz Kubot (Austria) Oliver Marach	6–2, 7–6^{(7–3)}
Loss	0–3	Jun 2009	Rosmalen Championships, Netherlands	250 Series	Grass	(Sweden) Johan Brunström	(South Africa) Wesley Moodie (Belgium) Dick Norman	6–7^{(3–7)}, 7–6^{(7–3)}, [5–10]
Loss	0–4	Aug 2009	Croatia Open, Croatia	250 Series	Clay	(Sweden) Johan Brunström	(Czech Republic) František Čermák (Slovakia) Michal Mertiňák	4–6, 4–6
Loss	0–5	Sep 2009	Romanian Open, Romania	250 Series	Clay	(Sweden) Johan Brunström	(Czech Republic) František Čermák (Slovakia) Michal Mertiňák	2–6, 4–6
Loss	0–6	Aug 2010	Los Angeles Open, United States	250 Series	Hard	(United States) Eric Butorac	(United States) Bob Bryan (United States) Mike Bryan	7–6^{(8–6)}, 2–6, [7–10]
Win	1–6	Oct 2010	Japan Open, Japan	500 Series	Hard	(United States) Eric Butorac	(Italy) Andreas Seppi (Russia) Dmitry Tursunov	6–3, 6–2
Win	2–6	Oct 2010	Stockholm Open, Sweden	250 Series	Hard (i)	(United States) Eric Butorac	(Sweden) Johan Brunström (Finland) Jarkko Nieminen	6–3, 6–4
Loss	2–7	Feb 2011	U.S. National Indoor Championships, United States	500 Series	Hard (i)	(United States) Eric Butorac	(Belarus) Max Mirnyi (Canada) Daniel Nestor	2–6, 7–6^{(8–6)}, [3–10]
Win	3–7	May 2011	Estoril Open, Portugal	250 Series	Clay	(United States) Eric Butorac	(Spain) Marc López (Spain) David Marrero	6–3, 6–4
Win	4–7	May 2011	Open de Nice Côte d'Azur, France	250 Series	Clay	(United States) Eric Butorac	(Mexico) Santiago González (Spain) David Marrero	6–3, 6–4
Win	5–7	Oct 2011	Malaysian Open, Malaysia	250 Series	Hard (i)	(United States) Eric Butorac	(Czech Republic) František Čermák (Slovakia) Filip Polášek	6–1, 6–3
Loss	5–8	Nov 2011	Valencia Open, Spain	500 Series	Hard (i)	(United States) Eric Butorac	(United States) Bob Bryan (United States) Mike Bryan	4–6, 6–7^{(9–11)}
Win	6–8	May 2012	Estoril Open, Portugal (2)	250 Series	Clay	(Pakistan) Aisam-ul-Haq Qureshi	(Austria) Julian Knowle (Spain) David Marrero	7–5, 7–5
Win	7–8	Jun 2012	Halle Open, Germany	250 Series	Grass	(Pakistan) Aisam-ul-Haq Qureshi	(Philippines) Treat Huey (United States) Scott Lipsky	6–3, 6–4
Loss	7–9	Nov 2012	Paris Masters, France	Masters 1000	Hard (i)	(Pakistan) Aisam-ul-Haq Qureshi	(India) Mahesh Bhupathi (India) Rohan Bopanna	6–7^{(6–8)}, 3–6
Loss	7–10	Feb 2013	Open 13, France	250 Series	Hard (i)	(Pakistan) Aisam-ul-Haq Qureshi	(India) Rohan Bopanna (United Kingdom) Colin Fleming	4–6, 6–7^{(3–7)}
Win	8–10	Mar 2013	Miami Open, United States	Masters 1000	Hard	(Pakistan) Aisam-ul-Haq Qureshi	(Poland) Mariusz Fyrstenberg (Poland) Marcin Matkowski	6–4, 6–1
Loss	8–11	May 2013	Portugal Open, Portugal	250 Series	Clay	(Pakistan) Aisam-ul-Haq Qureshi	(Mexico) Santiago González (United States) Scott Lipsky	3–6, 6–4, [7–10]
Win	9–11	Oct 2013	Stockholm Open, Sweden (2)	250 Series	Hard (i)	(Pakistan) Aisam-ul-Haq Qureshi	(Sweden) Jonas Björkman (Sweden) Robert Lindstedt	6–2, 6–2
Win	10–11	Feb 2014	Zagreb Indoors, Croatia	250 Series	Hard (i)	(Romania) Horia Tecău	(Germany) Philipp Marx (Slovakia) Michal Mertiňák	3–6, 6–4, [10–2]
Loss	10–12	Feb 2014	Rotterdam Open, Netherlands	500 Series	Hard (i)	(Romania) Horia Tecău	(France) Michaël Llodra (France) Nicolas Mahut	2–6, 6–7^{(7–4)}
Win	11–12	Apr 2014	Grand Prix Hassan II, Morocco	250 Series	Clay	(Romania) Horia Tecău	(Poland) Tomasz Bednarek (Czech Republic) Lukáš Dlouhý	6–2, 6–2
Win	12–12	Apr 2014	Romanian Open, Romania	250 Series	Clay	(Romania) Horia Tecău	(Poland) Mariusz Fyrstenberg (Poland) Marcin Matkowski	6–4, 6–4
Win	13–12	Jun 2014	Rosmalen Championships, Netherlands	250 Series	Grass	(Romania) Horia Tecău	(Mexico) Santiago González (United States) Scott Lipsky	6–3, 7–6^{(7–3)}
Win	14–12	Aug 2014	Washington Open, United States	500 Series	Hard	(Romania) Horia Tecău	(Australia) Sam Groth (India) Leander Paes	7–5, 6–4
Win	15–12	Sep 2014	Shenzhen Open, China	250 Series	Hard	(Romania) Horia Tecău	(Australia) Chris Guccione (Australia) Sam Groth	6–4, 7–6^{(7–4)}
Win	16–12	Oct 2014	China Open, China	500 Series	Hard	(Romania) Horia Tecău	(France) Julien Benneteau (Canada) Vasek Pospisil	6–7^{(6–8)}, 7–5, [10–5]
Win	17–12	Oct 2014	Valencia Open, Spain	500 Series	Hard (i)	(Romania) Horia Tecău	(South Africa) Kevin Anderson (France) Jérémy Chardy	6–4, 6–2
Loss	17–13	Jan 2015	Sydney International, Australia	250 Series	Hard	(Romania) Horia Tecău	(India) Rohan Bopanna (Canada) Daniel Nestor	4–6, 6–7^{(5–7)}
Win	18–13	Feb 2015	Rotterdam Open, Netherlands	500 Series	Hard (i)	(Romania) Horia Tecău	(United Kingdom) Jamie Murray (Australia) John Peers	3–6, 6–3, [10–8]
Loss	18–14	May 2015	Open de Nice Côte d'Azur, France	250 Series	Clay	(Romania) Horia Tecău	(Croatia) Mate Pavić (New Zealand) Michael Venus	6–7^{(4–7)}, 6–2, [7–10]
Win	19–14	Jul 2015	Wimbledon Championships, United Kingdom	Grand Slam	Grass	(Romania) Horia Tecău	(United Kingdom) Jamie Murray (Australia) John Peers	7–6^{(7–5)}, 6–4, 6–4
Win	20–14	Nov 2015	ATP World Tour Finals, United Kingdom	Tour Finals	Hard (i)	(Romania) Horia Tecău	(India) Rohan Bopanna (Romania) Florin Mergea	6–4, 6–3
Win	21–14	May 2016	Madrid Open, Spain	Masters 1000	Clay	(Romania) Horia Tecău	(India) Rohan Bopanna (Romania) Florin Mergea	6–4, 6–3
Loss	21–15	Aug 2016	Cincinnati Masters, United States	Masters 1000	Hard	(Romania) Horia Tecău	(Croatia) Ivan Dodig (Brazil) Marcelo Melo	6–7^{(5–7)}, 7–6^{(7–5)}, [6–10]
Win	22–15	Mar 2017	Dubai Tennis Championships, UAE	500 Series	Hard	(Romania) Horia Tecău	(India) Rohan Bopanna (Poland) Marcin Matkowski	4–6, 6–3, [10–3]
Win	23–15	May 2017	Geneva Open, Switzerland	250 Series	Clay	(Romania) Horia Tecău	(Colombia) Juan Sebastián Cabal (Colombia) Robert Farah	2–6, 7–6^{(11–9)}, [10–6]
Win	24–15	Aug 2017	Winston-Salem Open, United States	250 Series	Hard	(Romania) Horia Tecău	(Chile) Julio Peralta (Argentina) Horacio Zeballos	6–3, 6–4
Win	25–15	Sep 2017	US Open, United States	Grand Slam	Hard	(Romania) Horia Tecău	(Spain) Feliciano López (Spain) Marc López	6–4, 6–3
Loss	25–16	Oct 2017	Stockholm Open, Sweden	250 Series	Hard (i)	(Pakistan) Aisam-ul-Haq Qureshi	(Austria) Oliver Marach (Croatia) Mate Pavić	6–3, 6–7^{(6–8)}, [4–10]
Win	26–16	Mar 2018	Dubai Tennis Championships, UAE (2)	500 Series	Hard	(Romania) Horia Tecău	(United States) James Cerretani (India) Leander Paes	6–2, 7–6^{(7–2)}
Loss	26–17	Apr 2018	Barcelona Open, Spain	500 Series	Clay	(Pakistan) Aisam-ul-Haq Qureshi	(Spain) Feliciano López (Spain) Marc López	6–7^{(5–7)}, 4–6
Win	27–17	Aug 2018	Winston-Salem Open, United States (2)	250 Series	Hard	(Romania) Horia Tecău	(United States) James Cerretani (India) Leander Paes	6–4, 6–2
Loss	27–18	Nov 2018	Paris Masters, France	Masters 1000	Hard (i)	(Romania) Horia Tecău	(Spain) Marcel Granollers (United States) Rajeev Ram	4–6, 4–6
Loss	27–19	Feb 2019	Rotterdam Open, Netherlands	500 Series	Hard (i)	(Romania) Horia Tecău	(France) Jérémy Chardy (Finland) Henri Kontinen	6–7^{(5–7)}, 6–7^{(4–7)}
Win	28–19	May 2019	Madrid Open, Spain	Masters 1000	Clay	(Romania) Horia Tecău	(Argentina) Diego Schwartzman (Austria) Dominic Thiem	6–2, 6–3
Loss	28–20	Aug 2019	Washington Open, United States	500 Series	Hard	(Romania) Horia Tecău	(South Africa) Raven Klaasen (New Zealand) Michael Venus	6–3, 3–6, [2–10]
Win	29–20	Oct 2019	Swiss Indoors, Switzerland	500 Series	Hard (i)	(Romania) Horia Tecău	(United States) Taylor Fritz (United States) Reilly Opelka	7–5, 6–3
Loss	29–21	Oct 2021	European Open, Belgium	250 Series	Hard (i)	(Netherlands) Wesley Koolhof	(France) Nicolas Mahut (France) Fabrice Martin	0–6, 1–6
Loss	29–22	Nov 2021	Stockholm Open, Sweden	250 Series	Hard (i)	(Pakistan) Aisam-ul-Haq Qureshi	(Mexico) Santiago González (Argentina) Andrés Molteni	2–6, 2–6
Win	30–22	Feb 2022	Dallas Open, United States	250 Series	Hard (i)	(El Salvador) Marcelo Arévalo	(United Kingdom) Lloyd Glasspool (Finland) Harri Heliövaara	7–6^{(7–4)}, 6–4
Win	31–22	Feb 2022	Delray Beach Open, United States	250 Series	Hard	(El Salvador) Marcelo Arévalo	(Kazakhstan) Aleksandr Nedovyesov (Pakistan) Aisam-ul-Haq Qureshi	6–2, 6–7^{(5–7)}, [10–4]
Loss	31–23	Feb 2022	Mexican Open, Mexico	500 Series	Hard	(El Salvador) Marcelo Arévalo	(Spain) Feliciano López (Greece) Stefanos Tsitsipas	5–7, 4–6
Win	32–23	Jun 2022	French Open, France	Grand Slam	Clay	(El Salvador) Marcelo Arévalo	(Croatia) Ivan Dodig (United States) Austin Krajicek	6–7^{(4–7)}, 7–6^{(7–5)}, 6–3
Win	33–23	Oct 2022	Stockholm Open, Sweden (3)	250 Series	Hard (i)	(El Salvador) Marcelo Arévalo	(United Kingdom) Lloyd Glasspool (Finland) Harri Heliövaara	6–3, 6–3
Win	34–23	Jan 2023	Adelaide International 2, Australia	250 Series	Hard	(El Salvador) Marcelo Arévalo	(Croatia) Ivan Dodig (United States) Austin Krajicek	Walkover
Win	35–23	Feb 2023	Delray Beach Open, United States (2)	250 Series	Hard	(El Salvador) Marcelo Arévalo	(Australia) Rinky Hijikata (United States) Reese Stalder	6–3, 6–4
Win	36–23	Aug 2023	Canadian Open, Canada	Masters 1000	Hard	(El Salvador) Marcelo Arévalo	(United States) Rajeev Ram (United Kingdom) Joe Salisbury	6–3, 6–1
Win	37–23	Jan 2024	Brisbane International, Australia	250 Series	Hard	(United Kingdom) Lloyd Glasspool	(Germany) Kevin Krawietz (Germany) Tim Pütz	7–6^{(7–3)}, 5–7, [12–10]
Loss	37–24	May 2024	Geneva Open, Switzerland	250 Series	Clay	(United Kingdom) Lloyd Glasspool	(El Salvador) Marcelo Arévalo (Croatia) Mate Pavić	6–7^{(2–7)}, 5–7

== Doubles performance timeline ==
Key
W	F	SF	QF	#R	RR	Q#	P#	DNQ	A	Z#	PO	G	S	B	NMS	NTI	P	NH

(W) winner; (F) finalist; (SF) semifinalist; (QF) quarterfinalist; (#R) rounds 4, 3, 2, 1; (RR) round-robin stage; (Q#) qualification round; (P#) preliminary round; (DNQ) did not qualify; (A) absent; (Z#) Davis/Fed Cup Zonal Group (with number indication) or (PO) play-off; (G) gold, (S) silver or (B) bronze Olympic/Paralympic medal; (NMS) not a Masters tournament; (NTI) not a Tier I tournament; (P) postponed; (NH) not held; (SR) strike rate (events won / competed); (W–L) win–loss record.
To avoid confusion and double counting, these charts are updated at the conclusion of a tournament or when the player's participation has ended.

Current through the 2025 Rolex Shanghai Masters.

	Netherlands Antilles		Curaçao	Netherlands															
Tournament	2009	2010	2011	2012	2013	2014	2015	2016	2017	2018	2019	2020	2021	2022	2023	2024	2025	SR	W–L
Grand Slam tournaments
Australian Open	A	3R	SF	3R	3R	2R	SF	QF	3R	2R	1R	2R	A	1R	QF	3R	2R	0 / 15	28–15
French Open	2R	1R	1R	SF	3R	3R	SF	2R	3R	1R	QF	2R	3R	W	QF	1R	1R	1 / 17	32–16
Wimbledon	2R	1R	2R	3R	3R	3R	W	1R	1R	2R	QF	NH	1R	1R	2R	3R	1R	1 / 16	21–15
US Open	1R	1R	2R	SF	QF	3R	QF	3R	W	2R	1R	SF	3R	SF	3R	2R	3R	1 / 17	33–16
Win–loss	2–3	2–4	6–4	11–4	9–4	7–4	16–3	6–4	10–3	3–4	6–4	6–3	4–3	10–3	9–4	5–4	2–4	3 / 65	114–62
Year-end championship
ATP Finals	Did not qualify			RR	RR	RR	W	DNQ	RR	DNQ	RR	Did not qualify		RR	Did not qualify			1 / 7	7–16
National representation
Summer Olympics	Not Held			1R	Not Held			1R	Not Held				2R	Not Held		2R	NH	0 / 4	2–3
Davis Cup	A	A	A	PO	PO	1R	PO	Z1	PO	1R	RR	QR	A	A	A	F	A	0 / 3	22–10
Win–loss	0–0	0–0	0–0	3–1	2–0	0–2	1–0	1–1	1–0	1–1	1–2	1–0	1–0	0–0	0–0	1–2	0–0	0 / 7	24–13
ATP Masters Series 1000
Indian Wells	A	QF	1R	1R	1R	1R	1R	1R	QF	2R	QF	NH	2R	2R	1R	QF	A	0 / 14	11–14
Miami	1R	1R	1R	2R	W	1R	QF	1R	2R	2R	2R	NH	1R	1R	1R	QF	A	1 / 15	12–14
Monte Carlo	A	A	2R	1R	QF	1R	2R	2R	2R	A	2R	NH	1R	SF	QF	1R	A	0 / 12	5–12
Madrid	A	1R	A	QF	2R	2R	2R	W	1R	2R	W	NH	2R	A (Note: Planned for playing alongside Arevalo but they withdrew in the last minute. As a result, no alternates were chosen.)	SF	2R	A	2 / 12	17–10
Rome	A	1R	1R	A	2R	1R	QF	2R	1R	2R	2R	2R	QF	1R	1R	1R	A	0 / 14	4–14
Canada	A	A	2R	QF	QF	QF	QF	2R	2R	QF	3R	NH	A	QF	W	1R	A	1 / 12	12–11
Cincinnati	A	A	2R	QF	2R	QF	QF	F	QF	SF	2R	QF	A	QF	2R	1R	A	0 / 13	16–13
Shanghai	A	A	2R	QF	QF	2R	2R	2R	SF	2R	3R	Not Held			QF	SF	1R	0 / 12	13–12
Paris	2R	A	2R	F	QF	SF	QF	2R	SF	F	1R	2R	1R	2R	2R	1R	A	0 / 15	15–15
Win–loss	1–2	2–4	4–8	9–8	8–8	7–9	6–9	8–8	10–9	12–8	8–8	2–3	4–6	4–7	12–8	8–9	0–1	4 / 119	105–115
Career statistics
Titles / Finals	0 / 4	2 / 3	3 / 5	2 / 3	2 / 4	8 / 9	3 / 5	1 / 2	4 / 5	2 / 4	2 / 4	0 / 0	0 / 2	4 / 5	3 / 3	1 / 2	0 / 0	37 / 61	
Overall win–loss	18–21	28–26	42–26	41–31	31–28	48–25	51–22	25–23	44–26	36–25	36–28	12–13	15–21	39–21	34–21	27–32	7–15	545–415	
Year-end ranking	43	41	20	13	15	16	3	27	7	19	20	25	38	6	18	46	83	56.77%	

== Notes ==
Awards
Preceded by (United States) Bob Bryan & (United States) Mike Bryan	ATP Doubles Team of the Year (with (Romania) Horia Tecău); 2015	Succeeded by (United Kingdom) Jamie Murray & (Brazil) Bruno Soares
Preceded by (United States) Bob Bryan & (United States) Mike Bryan	ITF Men's Doubles World Champion (with (Romania) Horia Tecău); 2015	Succeeded by (United Kingdom) Jamie Murray & (Brazil) Bruno Soares
