= 2015 ATP World Tour Finals – Doubles =

Doubles
- 2015 ATP World Tour Finals

Final
- Champions: (Netherlands) Jean-Julien Rojer (Romania) Horia Tecău
- Runners-up: (India) Rohan Bopanna (Romania) Florin Mergea
- Score: 6–4, 6–3

Events
Singles	Doubles
- ATP World Tour Finals

Jean-Julien Rojer and Horia Tecău defeated Rohan Bopanna and Florin Mergea in the final, 6–4, 6–3 to win the doubles tennis title at the 2015 ATP World Tour Finals.

Bob and Mike Bryan were the defending champions, but lost in the semifinals to Rojer and Tecău.

== Seeds ==
1. (United States) Bob Bryan / (United States) Mike Bryan (semifinals)
2. (Netherlands) Jean-Julien Rojer / (Romania) Horia Tecău (champions)
3. (Croatia) Ivan Dodig / (Brazil) Marcelo Melo (semifinals)
4. (United Kingdom) Jamie Murray / (Australia) John Peers (round robin)
5. (Italy) Simone Bolelli / (Italy) Fabio Fognini (round robin)
6. (France) Pierre-Hugues Herbert / (France) Nicolas Mahut (round robin)
7. (Poland) Marcin Matkowski / (Serbia) Nenad Zimonjić (round robin)
8. (India) Rohan Bopanna / (Romania) Florin Mergea (final)

== Alternates ==
1. (Austria) Alexander Peya / (Brazil) Bruno Soares (Did not play)

== Draw ==
Key

- Q = Qualifier
- WC = Wild card
- LL = Lucky loser
- Alt = Alternate
- ITF = ITF entry
- PR = Protected ranking
- SR = Special ranking
- SE = Special exempt
- JE = Junior exempt
- JR = Junior Accelerator Programme entrant
- CO = College Accelerator Programme entrant
- NG = Next Gen Accelerator Program entrant
- w/o = Walkover
- r = Retired
- d = Defaulted

=== Finals ===
Semifinals
8	(India) Rohan Bopanna (Romania) Florin Mergea	6	6
3	(Croatia) Ivan Dodig (Brazil) Marcelo Melo	4	2
2	(Netherlands) Jean-Julien Rojer (Romania) Horia Tecău	6	6
1	(United States) Bob Bryan (United States) Mike Bryan	4	4

Final
8	(India) Rohan Bopanna (Romania) Florin Mergea	4	3
2	(Netherlands) Jean-Julien Rojer (Romania) Horia Tecău	6	6

=== Group Ashe/Smith ===
		(United States) Bryan (United States) Bryan	(United Kingdom) Murray (Australia) Peers	(Italy) Bolelli (Italy) Fognini	(India) Bopanna (Romania) Mergea	RR W–L	Set W–L	Game W–L	Standings
1	(United States) Bob Bryan (United States) Mike Bryan		6–7^{(5–7)}, 7–6^{(7–5)}, [16–14]	6–3, 6–2	4–6, 3–6	2–1	4–3	33–30	2
4	(United Kingdom) Jamie Murray (Australia) John Peers	7–6^{(7–5)}, 6–7^{(5–7)}, [14–16]		7–6^{(7–5)}, 3–6, [11–9]	3–6, 6–7^{(5–7)}	1–2	3–5	33–39	3
5	(Italy) Simone Bolelli (Italy) Fabio Fognini	3–6, 2–6	6–7^{(5–7)}, 6–3, [9–11]		6–4, 1–6, [10–5]	1–2	3–5	25–33	4
8	(India) Rohan Bopanna (Romania) Florin Mergea	6–4, 6–3	6–3, 7–6^{(7–5)}	4–6, 6–1, [5–10]		2–1	5–2	35–24	1

Standings are determined by: 1. number of wins; 2. number of matches; 3. in two-players-ties, head-to-head records; 4. in three-players-ties, percentage of sets won, or of games won; 5. steering-committee decision.

=== Group Fleming/McEnroe ===
		(Netherlands) Rojer (Romania) Tecău	(Croatia) Dodig (Brazil) Melo	(France) Herbert (France) Mahut	(Poland) Matkowski (Serbia) Zimonjić	RR W–L	Set W–L	Game W–L	Standings
2	(Netherlands) Jean-Julien Rojer (Romania) Horia Tecău		6–4, 7–6^{(7–3)}	6–4, 7–5	6–2, 6–4	3–0	6–0	38–25	1
3	(Croatia) Ivan Dodig (Brazil) Marcelo Melo	4–6, 6–7^{(3–7)}		3–6, 7–6^{(7–4)}, [10–7]	3–6, 7–5, [10–6]	2–1	4–4	32–36	2
6	(France) Pierre-Hugues Herbert (France) Nicolas Mahut	4–6, 5–7	6–3, 6–7^{(4–7)}, [7–10]		5–7, 6–3, [10–8]	1–2	3–5	33–34	3
7	(Poland) Marcin Matkowski (Serbia) Nenad Zimonjić	2–6, 4–6	6–3, 5–7, [6–10]	7–5, 3–6, [8–10]		0–3	2–6	27–35	4

Standings are determined by: 1. number of wins; 2. number of matches; 3. in two-players-ties, head-to-head records; 4. in three-players-ties, percentage of sets won, or of games won; 5. steering-committee decision.
