= 2017 Mutua Madrid Open – Men's doubles =

Men's doubles
- 2017 Mutua Madrid Open

Final
- Champions: (Poland) Łukasz Kubot (Brazil) Marcelo Melo
- Runners-up: (France) Nicolas Mahut (France) Édouard Roger-Vasselin
- Score: 7–5, 6–3

Events
Singles	men	women
Doubles	men	women
← 2016 ·	Mutua Madrid Open	· 2018 →

Jean-Julien Rojer and Horia Tecău were the defending champions, but lost in the first round to Nick Kyrgios and Jack Sock.

Łukasz Kubot and Marcelo Melo won the title, defeating Nicolas Mahut and Édouard Roger-Vasselin in the final, 7–5, 6–3.

== Seeds ==
All seeds receive a bye into the second round.

1. (Finland) Henri Kontinen / (Australia) John Peers (quarterfinals)
2. (United States) Bob Bryan / (United States) Mike Bryan (quarterfinals)
3. (United Kingdom) Jamie Murray / (Brazil) Bruno Soares (quarterfinals)
4. (Poland) Łukasz Kubot / (Brazil) Marcelo Melo (champions)
5. (South Africa) Raven Klaasen / (United States) Rajeev Ram (second round)
6. (France) Nicolas Mahut / (France) Édouard Roger-Vasselin (final)
7. (Croatia) Ivan Dodig / (Spain) Marcel Granollers (quarterfinals)
8. (Spain) Feliciano López / (Spain) Marc López (semifinals)

== Draw ==
=== Key ===
- Q = Qualifier
- WC = Wild card
- LL = Lucky loser
- Alt = Alternate
- SE = Special exempt
- PR = Protected ranking
- ITF = ITF entry
- JE = Junior exempt
- w/o = Walkover
- r = Retired
- d = Defaulted
- SR = Special ranking

=== Finals ===
Semifinals
8	(Spain) Feliciano López (Spain) Marc López	2	3
6	(France) Nicolas Mahut (France) Édouard Roger-Vasselin	6	6
4	(Poland) Łukasz Kubot (Brazil) Marcelo Melo	w/o
(Australia) Nick Kyrgios (United States) Jack Sock

Final
6	(France) Nicolas Mahut (France) Édouard Roger-Vasselin	5	3
4	(Poland) Łukasz Kubot (Brazil) Marcelo Melo	7	6

=== Top half ===
First round
(Austria) O Marach (Croatia) M Pavić	6^{5}	6	[10]
(Romania) F Mergea (Pakistan) A-u-H Qureshi	7^{7}	3	[8]
WC	(Spain) F Verdasco (Serbia) N Zimonjić	6	4	[5]
PR	(Germany) T Haas (Belarus) M Mirnyi	4	6	[10]
WC	(Spain) D Marrero (Spain) T Robredo	3	2
Alt	(Colombia) JS Cabal (Colombia) R Farah	6	6
(Poland) M Matkowski (Austria) A Peya	5	6^{5}
(Netherlands) R Haase (Spain) A Ramos Viñolas	7	7^{7}

Second round
1	(Finland) H Kontinen (Australia) J Peers	4	6	[14]
(Austria) O Marach (Croatia) M Pavić	6	4	[12]
PR	(Germany) T Haas (Belarus) M Mirnyi	3	4
8	(Spain) F López (Spain) M López	6	6
3	(United Kingdom) J Murray (Brazil) B Soares	6	7^{7}
Alt	(Colombia) JS Cabal (Colombia) R Farah	3	6^{4}
(Netherlands) R Haase (Spain) A Ramos Viñolas	6^{6}	6^{3}
6	(France) N Mahut (France) É Roger-Vasselin	7^{8}	7^{7}

Quarterfinals
1	(Finland) H Kontinen (Australia) J Peers	4	4
8	(Spain) F López (Spain) M López	6	6
3	(United Kingdom) J Murray (Brazil) B Soares	4	6	[7]
6	(France) N Mahut (France) É Roger-Vasselin	6	3	[10]

Semifinals
8	(Spain) F López (Spain) M López	2	3
6	(France) N Mahut (France) É Roger-Vasselin	6	6

=== Bottom half ===
First round
(Germany) P Kohlschreiber (Austria) D Thiem	6^{6}	2
(Italy) F Fognini (Philippines) T Huey	7^{8}	6
Alt	(United States) B Baker (United States) N Monroe	5	7^{7}	[10]
(Luxembourg) G Müller (France) G Simon	7	6^{2}	[8]
(Australia) N Kyrgios (United States) J Sock	6	7^{8}
(Netherlands) J-J Rojer (Romania) H Tecău	4	6^{6}
(India) R Bopanna (Uruguay) P Cuevas	3	2
(France) F Martin (Canada) D Nestor	6	6

Second round
7	(Croatia) I Dodig (Spain) M Granollers	6^{4}	7	[10]
(Italy) F Fognini (Philippines) T Huey	7^{7}	5	[6]
Alt	(United States) B Baker (United States) N Monroe	3	4
4	(Poland) Ł Kubot (Brazil) M Melo	6	6
5	(South Africa) R Klaasen (United States) R Ram	4	4
(Australia) N Kyrgios (United States) J Sock	6	6
(France) F Martin (Canada) D Nestor	7	2	[7]
2	(United States) B Bryan (United States) M Bryan	5	6	[10]

Quarterfinals
7	(Croatia) I Dodig (Spain) M Granollers	1	4
4	(Poland) Ł Kubot (Brazil) M Melo	6	6
(Australia) N Kyrgios (United States) J Sock	6^{5}	7^{7}	[10]
2	(United States) B Bryan (United States) M Bryan	7^{7}	6^{5}	[7]

Semifinals
4	(Poland) Ł Kubot (Brazil) M Melo	w/o
(Australia) N Kyrgios (United States) J Sock
