= 2014 Mutua Madrid Open – Men's doubles =

Men's doubles
- 2014 Mutua Madrid Open

Final
- Champions: (Canada) Daniel Nestor (Serbia) Nenad Zimonjić
- Runners-up: (United States) Bob Bryan (United States) Mike Bryan
- Score: 6–4, 6–2

Details
- Draw: 24
- Seeds: 8

Events
Singles	men	women
Doubles	men	women
- Mutua Madrid Open

Bob Bryan and Mike Bryan were the defending champions, but lost to Daniel Nestor and Nenad Zimonjić in the final, 4–6, 2–6.

== Seeds ==
1. (United States) Bob Bryan / (United States) Mike Bryan (final)
2. (Austria) Alexander Peya / (Brazil) Bruno Soares (quarterfinals)
3. (Croatia) Ivan Dodig / (Brazil) Marcelo Melo (second round)
4. (Spain) David Marrero / (Spain) Fernando Verdasco (semifinals)
5. (France) Michaël Llodra / (France) Nicolas Mahut (second round)
6. (Canada) Daniel Nestor / (Serbia) Nenad Zimonjić (champions)
7. (Poland) Łukasz Kubot / (Sweden) Robert Lindstedt (second round)
8. (India) Rohan Bopanna / (Pakistan) Aisam-ul-Haq Qureshi (quarterfinals)

== Draw ==
Key

- Q = Qualifier
- WC = Wild card
- LL = Lucky loser
- Alt = Alternate
- ITF = ITF entry
- PR = Protected ranking
- SR = Special ranking
- SE = Special exempt
- JE = Junior exempt
- JR = Junior Accelerator Programme entrant
- CO = College Accelerator Programme entrant
- NG = Next Gen Accelerator Program entrant
- w/o = Walkover
- r = Retired
- d = Defaulted

=== Finals ===
Semifinals
1	(United States) Bob Bryan (United States) Mike Bryan	7^{7}	7
4	(Spain) David Marrero (Spain) Fernando Verdasco	6^{3}	5
(Colombia) Juan Sebastián Cabal (Colombia) Robert Farah	5	4
6	(Canada) Daniel Nestor (Serbia) Nenad Zimonjić	7	6

Final
1	(United States) Bob Bryan (United States) Mike Bryan	4	2
6	(Canada) Daniel Nestor (Serbia) Nenad Zimonjić	6	6

=== Top half ===
First round
(Netherlands) J-J Rojer (Romania) H Tecău	6	1	[10]
(Italy) F Fognini (Mexico) S González	3	6	[7]
(Poland) M Fyrstenberg (Poland) M Matkowski	2	6	[10]
(United Kingdom) J Murray (Australia) J Peers	6	3	[6]
(Czech Republic) T Berdych (United States) J Isner	6	6
WC	(Israel) J Erlich (Czech Republic) L Rosol	3	4
(United States) E Butorac (South Africa) R Klaasen	6^{7}	6	[10]
(Canada) M Raonic (Italy) A Seppi	7^{9}	3	[12]

Second round
1	(United States) B Bryan (United States) M Bryan	7	3	[11]
(Netherlands) J-J Rojer (Romania) H Tecău	5	6	[9]
(Poland) M Fyrstenberg (Poland) M Matkowski	7	6^{6}	[13]
7	(Poland) Ł Kubot (Sweden) R Lindstedt	5	7^{8}	[11]
4	(Spain) D Marrero (Spain) F Verdasco	w/o
(Czech Republic) T Berdych (United States) J Isner
(Canada) M Raonic (Italy) A Seppi
8	(India) R Bopanna (Pakistan) A-u-H Qureshi	w/o

Quarterfinals
1	(United States) B Bryan (United States) M Bryan	7^{7}	6
(Poland) M Fyrstenberg (Poland) M Matkowski	6^{4}	3
4	(Spain) D Marrero (Spain) F Verdasco	7^{7}	7^{8}
8	(India) R Bopanna (Pakistan) A-u-H Qureshi	6^{5}	6^{6}

Semifinals
1	(United States) B Bryan (United States) M Bryan	7^{7}	7
4	(Spain) D Marrero (Spain) F Verdasco	6^{3}	5

=== Bottom half ===
First round
(Croatia) M Čilić (Czech Republic) L Dlouhý	1	5
PR	(South Africa) K Anderson (Austria) J Melzer	6	7
(Belarus) M Mirnyi (Russia) M Youzhny	3	4
(Colombia) JS Cabal (Colombia) R Farah	6	6
WC	(Spain) F López (Argentina) J Mónaco	7^{8}	3	[10]
(Spain) M Granollers (Spain) M López	6^{6}	6	[12]
(France) J Benneteau (France) É Roger-Vasselin	2	6	[7]
(Philippines) T Huey (United Kingdom) D Inglot	6	4	[10]

Second round
5	(France) M Llodra (France) N Mahut	3	3
PR	(South Africa) K Anderson (Austria) J Melzer	6	6
(Colombia) JS Cabal (Colombia) R Farah	6	6
3	(Croatia) I Dodig (Brazil) M Melo	4	2
6	(Canada) D Nestor (Serbia) N Zimonjić	6	6
(Spain) M Granollers (Spain) M López	4	2
(Philippines) T Huey (United Kingdom) D Inglot	7^{7}	1	[8]
2	(Austria) A Peya (Brazil) B Soares	6^{2}	6	[10]

Quarterfinals
PR	(South Africa) K Anderson (Austria) J Melzer	7^{7}	3	[6]
(Colombia) JS Cabal (Colombia) R Farah	6^{5}	6	[10]
6	(Canada) D Nestor (Serbia) N Zimonjić	7^{7}	6
2	(Austria) A Peya (Brazil) B Soares	6^{2}	4

Semifinals
(Colombia) JS Cabal (Colombia) R Farah	5	4
6	(Canada) D Nestor (Serbia) N Zimonjić	7	6
