= 2007 Hamburg Masters – Doubles =

Doubles
- 2007 Hamburg Masters

Final
- Champion: (United States) Bob Bryan (United States) Mike Bryan
- Runner-up: (Australia) Paul Hanley (Zimbabwe) Kevin Ullyett
- Score: 6–3, 6–4

Details
- Draw: 24 (2WC)
- Seeds: 8

Events
Singles	Doubles
- Hamburg Masters

The men's doubles at the 2007 Hamburg Masters was won by Bob and Mike Bryan, who defeated Paul Hanley and Kevin Ullyett in the final.

== Seeds ==
All seeds receive a bye into the second round.

1. (United States) Bob Bryan / (United States) Mike Bryan (champions)
2. (Sweden) Jonas Björkman / (Belarus) Max Mirnyi (quarterfinals)
3. (Czech Republic) Martin Damm / (Serbia) Nenad Zimonjić (second round)
4. (The Bahamas) Mark Knowles / (Canada) Daniel Nestor (second round)
5. (Australia) Paul Hanley / (Zimbabwe) Kevin Ullyett (finals)
6. (Israel) Jonathan Erlich / (Israel) Andy Ram (semifinals)
7. (Czech Republic) Pavel Vízner / (Australia) Todd Perry (second round)
8. (Sweden) Simon Aspelin / (Austria) Julian Knowle (semifinals)

== Draw ==
Key

- Q = Qualifier
- WC = Wild card
- LL = Lucky loser
- Alt = Alternate
- ITF = ITF entry
- PR = Protected ranking
- SR = Special ranking
- SE = Special exempt
- JE = Junior exempt
- JR = Junior Accelerator Programme entrant
- CO = College Accelerator Programme entrant
- NG = Next Gen Accelerator Program entrant
- w/o = Walkover
- r = Retired
- d = Defaulted

=== Finals ===
Semifinals
1	(United States) Bob Bryan (United States) Mike Bryan	6	3	[10]
6	(Israel) Jonathan Erlich (Israel) Andy Ram	2	6	[7]
5	(Australia) Paul Hanley (Zimbabwe) Kevin Ullyett	6	3	[10]
8	(Sweden) Simon Aspelin (Austria) Julian Knowle	2	6	[4]

Finals
1	(United States) Bob Bryan (United States) Mike Bryan	6	6
5	(Australia) Paul Hanley (Zimbabwe) Kevin Ullyett	3	4

=== Section 1 ===
First round
(India) M Bhupathi (Czech Republic) R Štěpánek	6	6
(Romania) A Pavel (Germany) A Waske	3	2
(Switzerland) Y Allegro (Cyprus) M Baghdatis	3	6	[13]
(Croatia) I Ljubičić (United States) J Thomas	6	3	[11]
(United States) J Blake (United States) M Fish	6	7
(Switzerland) R Federer (Switzerland) S Wawrinka	1	5
(Russia) I Andreev (Russia) D Tursunov	6	6
(Slovakia) D Hrbatý (Czech Republic) J Levinský	4	4

Second round
1	(United States) B Bryan (United States) M Bryan	6^{4}	6	[14]
(India) M Bhupathi (Czech Republic) R Štěpánek	7^{7}	3	[12]
(Switzerland) Y Allegro (Cyprus) M Baghdatis	6	6
7	(Czech Republic) P Vízner (Australia) T Perry	3	3
4	(The Bahamas) M Knowles (Canada) D Nestor	2	2
(United States) J Blake (United States) M Fish	6	6
(Russia) I Andreev (Russia) D Tursunov	2	2
6	(Israel) J Erlich (Israel) A Ram	6	6

Quarterfinals
1	(United States) B Bryan (United States) M Bryan	6	7^{7}
(Switzerland) Y Allegro (Cyprus) M Baghdatis	2	6^{5}
(United States) J Blake (United States) M Fish	3	6^{2}
6	(Israel) J Erlich (Israel) A Ram	6	7^{7}

Semifinals
1	(United States) B Bryan (United States) M Bryan	6	3	[10]
6	(Israel) J Erlich (Israel) A Ram	2	6	[7]

=== Section 2 ===
First round
(Czech Republic) D Škoch (Netherlands) R Wassen	2	5
(Argentina) A Calleri (Finland) J Nieminen	6	7
(Germany) P Kohlschreiber (Sweden) R Söderling	3	0
(France) J Benneteau (France) A Clément	6	6
(Poland) M Fyrstenberg (Poland) M Matkowski	4	7	[14]
(Argentina) G Cañas (Argentina) M García	6	5	[12]
WC	(Germany) M Berrer (Germany) C Kas	6	6
WC	(Germany) M Kohlmann (Germany) R Schüttler	4	3

Second round
5	(Australia) P Hanley (Zimbabwe) K Ullyett	7^{7}	3	[10]
(Argentina) A Calleri (Finland) J Nieminen	6^{1}	6	[7]
(France) J Benneteau (France) A Clément	6	6
3	(Czech Republic) M Damm (Serbia) N Zimonjić	4	4
8	(Sweden) S Aspelin (Austria) J Knowle	6	3	[10]
(Poland) M Fyrstenberg (Poland) M Matkowski	3	6	[7]
WC	(Germany) M Berrer (Germany) C Kas	3	3
2	(Sweden) J Björkman (Belarus) M Mirnyi	6	6

Quarterfinals
5	(Australia) P Hanley (Zimbabwe) K Ullyett	2	7^{7}	[10]
(France) J Benneteau (France) A Clément	6	6^{5}	[7]
8	(Sweden) S Aspelin (Austria) J Knowle	7	6
2	(Sweden) J Björkman (Belarus) M Mirnyi	5	2

Semifinals
5	(Australia) P Hanley (Zimbabwe) K Ullyett	6	3	[10]
8	(Sweden) S Aspelin (Austria) J Knowle	2	6	[4]
