= 2005 Tennis Masters Cup – Doubles =

Doubles
- 2005 Tennis Masters Cup

Final
- Champions: (France) Michaël Llodra (France) Fabrice Santoro
- Runners-up: (India) Leander Paes (Serbia and Montenegro) Nenad Zimonjić
- Score: 6–7^{(6–8)}, 6–3, 7–6^{(7–4)}

Details
- Draw: 8

Events
Singles	Doubles
← 2004 ·	Tennis Masters Cup	· 2006 →

Michaël Llodra and Fabrice Santoro defeated Leander Paes and Nenad Zimonjić in the final, 6–7^{(6–8)}, 6–3, 7–6^{(7–4)} to win the doubles tennis title at the 2005 Tennis Masters Cup.

Bob Bryan and Mike Bryan were the two-time defending champions, but were defeated in the semifinals by Llodra and Santoro.

== Seeds ==
1. (United States) Bob Bryan / (United States) Mike Bryan (semifinals)
2. (Sweden) Jonas Björkman / (Belarus) Max Mirnyi (round robin)
3. (Zimbabwe) Wayne Black / (Zimbabwe) Kevin Ullyett (semifinals)
4. (The Bahamas) Mark Knowles / (Canada) Daniel Nestor (round robin)
5. (India) Leander Paes / (Serbia and Montenegro) Nenad Zimonjić (final)
6. (France) Michaël Llodra / (France) Fabrice Santoro (champions)
7. (Australia) Wayne Arthurs / (Australia) Paul Hanley (round robin)
8. (Australia) Stephen Huss / (South Africa) Wesley Moodie (round robin, retired)

== Draw ==
=== Key ===
- Q = Qualifier
- WC = Wild card
- LL = Lucky loser
- Alt = Alternate
- SE = Special exempt
- PR = Protected ranking
- ITF = ITF entry
- JE = Junior exempt
- w/o = Walkover
- r = Retired
- d = Defaulted
- SR = Special ranking

=== Finals ===
Semifinals
1	(United States) Bob Bryan (United States) Mike Bryan	3	6^{7}
6	(France) Michaël Llodra (France) Fabrice Santoro	6	7^{9}
3	(Zimbabwe) Wayne Black (Zimbabwe) Kevin Ullyett	3	4
5	(India) Leander Paes (Serbia and Montenegro) Nenad Zimonjić	6	6

Final
6	(France) Michaël Llodra (France) Fabrice Santoro	6^{6}	6	7^{7}
5	(India) Leander Paes (Serbia and Montenegro) Nenad Zimonjić	7^{8}	3	6^{4}

=== Red group ===
		(United States) Bryan (United States) Bryan	(The Bahamas) Knowles (Canada) Nestor	(India) Paes (Serbia and Montenegro) Zimonjić	(Australia) Arthurs (Australia) Hanley	RR; W–L	Set; W–L	Game; W–L	Standings
1	(United States) Bob Bryan (United States) Mike Bryan		6–4, 6–4	7–5, 6–7^{(5–7)}, 7–6^{(9–7)}	5–7, 7–6^{(7–3)}, 6–7^{(4–7)}	2–1	5–3 (62.50%)	50–46	1
4	(The Bahamas) Mark Knowles (Canada) Daniel Nestor	4–6, 4–6		5–7, 7–5, 3–6	3–6, 4–6	0–3	1–6	30–42	4
5	(India) Leander Paes (Serbia and Montenegro) Nenad Zimonjić	5–7, 7–6^{(7–5)}, 6–7^{(7–9)}	7–5, 5–7, 6–3		7–6^{(7–3)}, 7–6^{(8–6)}	2–1	5–3 (62.50%)	50–47	2
7	(Australia) Wayne Arthurs (Australia) Paul Hanley	7–5, 6–7^{(3–7)}, 7–6^{(7–4)}	6–3, 6–4	6–7^{(3–7)}, 6–7^{(6–8)}		2–1	4–3 (57.14%)	44–39	3

Standings are determined by: 1. number of wins; 2. number of matches; 3. in two-players-ties, head-to-head records; 4. in three-players-ties, percentage of sets won, or of games won; 5. steering-committee decision.

=== Gold group ===
		(Sweden) Björkman (Belarus) Mirnyi	(Zimbabwe) Black (Zimbabwe) Ullyett	(France) Llodra (France) Santoro	(Australia) Huss (South Africa) Moodie	RR; W–L	Set; W–L	Game; W–L	Standings
2	(Sweden) Jonas Björkman (Belarus) Max Mirnyi		5–7, 6–4, 4–6	6–7^{(3–7)}, 4–6	2–6, 4–6	0–3	1–6	31–42	4
3	(Zimbabwe) Wayne Black (Zimbabwe) Kevin Ullyett	7–5, 4–6, 6–4		3–6, 6–3, 6–4	3–6, 7–6^{(7–1)}, 6–2	3–0	6–3	48–42	1
6	(France) Michaël Llodra (France) Fabrice Santoro	7–6^{(7–3)}, 6–4	6–3, 3–6, 4–6		6–4, 4–1^{r}	2–1	5–2	36–30	2
8	(Australia) Stephen Huss (South Africa) Wesley Moodie	6–2, 6–4	6–3, 6–7^{(1–7)}, 2–6	4–6, 1–4^{r}		1–2	3–4	31–32	3

Standings are determined by: 1. number of wins; 2. number of matches; 3. in two-players-ties, head-to-head records; 4. in three-players-ties, percentage of sets won, or of games won; 5. steering-committee decision.
