= 2003 Tennis Masters Cup – Doubles =

Doubles
- 2003 Tennis Masters Cup

Final
- Champions: (United States) Bob Bryan (United States) Mike Bryan
- Runners-up: (France) Michaël Llodra (France) Fabrice Santoro
- Score: 6–7^{(6–8)}, 6–3, 3–6, 7–6^{(7–3)}, 6–4

Events
Singles	Doubles
← 2001 ·	Tennis Masters Cup	· 2004 →

Bob Bryan and Mike Bryan defeated Michaël Llodra and Fabrice Santoro in the final, 6–7^{(6–8)}, 6–3, 3–6, 7–6^{(7–3)}, 6–4 to win the doubles tennis title at the 2003 Tennis Masters Cup. It was their first Tour Finals title.

Ellis Ferreira and Rick Leach were the reigning champions, but did not compete that year.

== Seeds ==
Champion seeds are indicated in bold text while text in italics indicates the round in which those seeds were eliminated.

1. (United States) **Bob Bryan** / (United States) **Mike Bryan (champions)**
2. (India) Mahesh Bhupathi / (Belarus) Max Mirnyi (round robin)
3. (Sweden) Jonas Björkman / (Australia) Todd Woodbridge (round robin)
4. (The Bahamas) Mark Knowles / (Canada) Daniel Nestor (semifinals)
5. (Australia) Wayne Arthurs / (Australia) Paul Hanley (round robin)
6. (France) Michaël Llodra / (France) Fabrice Santoro (final)
7. (Czech Republic) Martin Damm / (Czech Republic) Cyril Suk (round robin)
8. (Argentina) Gastón Etlis / (Argentina) Martín Rodríguez (semifinals)

== Draw ==
=== Key ===
- Q = Qualifier
- WC = Wild card
- LL = Lucky loser
- Alt = Alternate
- SE = Special exempt
- PR = Protected ranking
- ITF = ITF entry
- JE = Junior exempt
- w/o = Walkover
- r = Retired
- d = Defaulted
- SR = Special ranking

=== Finals ===
Semifinals
1	(United States) **Bob Bryan** (United States) **Mike Bryan**	**6**	**6**
8	(Argentina) Gastón Etlis (Argentina) Martin Rodríguez	2	4
4	(The Bahamas) Mark Knowles (Canada) Daniel Nestor	1	3
6	(France) **Michaël Llodra** (France) **Fabrice Santoro**	**6**	**6**

Final
1	(United States) **Bob Bryan** (United States) **Mike Bryan**	6^{6}	**6**	3	**7^{7}**	**6**
6	(France) Michaël Llodra (France) Fabrice Santoro	**7^{8}**	3	**6**	6^{3}	4

=== Red group ===
		(United States) **Bryan** (United States) **Bryan**	(Sweden) Björkman (Australia) Woodbridge	(France) **Llodra** (France) **Santoro**	(Czech Republic) Damm (Czech Republic) Suk	RR; W–L	Set; W–L	Game; W–L	Standings
1	(United States) **Bob Bryan** (United States) **Mike Bryan**		**4–6, 6–3, 7–6^{(11–9)}**	**6–4, 5–7, 6–4**	**7–5, 6–7^{(0–7)}, 7–6^{(7–4)}**	**3–0**	**6–3**	**54–48**	**1**
3	(Sweden) Jonas Björkman (Australia) Todd Woodbridge	6–4, 3–6, 6–7^{(9–11)}		6–7^{(1–7)}, 6–3, 4–6	**6–3, 6–3**	1–2	4–4	43–39	3
6	(France) **Michaël Llodra** (France) **Fabrice Santoro**	4–6, 7–5, 4–6	**7–6^{(7–1)}, 3–6, 6–4**		**6–3, 7–6^{(7–5)}**	**2–1**	**5–3**	**44–42**	**2**
7	(Czech Republic) Martin Damm (Czech Republic) Cyril Suk	5–7, 7–6^{(7–0)}, 6–7^{(4–7)}	3–6, 3–6	3–6, 6–7^{(5–7)}		0–3	1–6	33–45	4

Standings are determined by: 1. number of wins; 2. number of matches; 3. in two-players-ties, head-to-head records; 4. in three-players-ties, percentage of sets won, or of games won; 5. steering-committee decision.

=== Blue group ===
		(India) Bhupathi (Belarus) Mirnyi	(The Bahamas) **Knowles** (Canada) **Nestor**	(Australia) Arthurs (Australia) Hanley	(Argentina) **Etlis** (Argentina) **Rodríguez**	RR; W–L	Set; W–L	Game; W–L	Standings
2	(India) Mahesh Bhupathi (Belarus) Max Mirnyi		4–6, 7–6^{(8–6)}, 6–7^{(4–7)}	**6–4, 7–6^{(7–4)}**	4–6, 4–6	1–2	3–4	38–41	3
4	(The Bahamas) **Mark Knowles** (Canada) **Daniel Nestor**	**6–4, 6–7^{(6–8)}, 7–6^{(7–4)}**		**6–4, 6–7^{(5–7)}, 7–6^{(8–6)}**	**6–2, 6–1**	**3–0**	**6–2**	**50–37**	**1**
5	(Australia) Wayne Arthurs (Australia) Paul Hanley	4–6, 6–7^{(4–7)}	4–6, 7–6^{(7–5)}, 6–7^{(6–8)}		**4–6, 7–6^{(7–5)}, 7–6^{(11–9)}**	1–2	3–5	45–50	4
8	(Argentina) **Gastón Etlis** (Argentina) **Martín Rodríguez**	**6–4, 6–4**	2–6, 1–6	6–4, 6–7^{(5–7)}, 6–7^{(9–11)}		**1–2**	**3–4**	**33–38**	**2**

Standings are determined by: 1. number of wins; 2. number of matches; 3. in two-players-ties, head-to-head records; 4. in three-players-ties, percentage of sets won, or of games won; 5. steering-committee decision.
