= Mike Bryan =

American tennis player (born 1978)

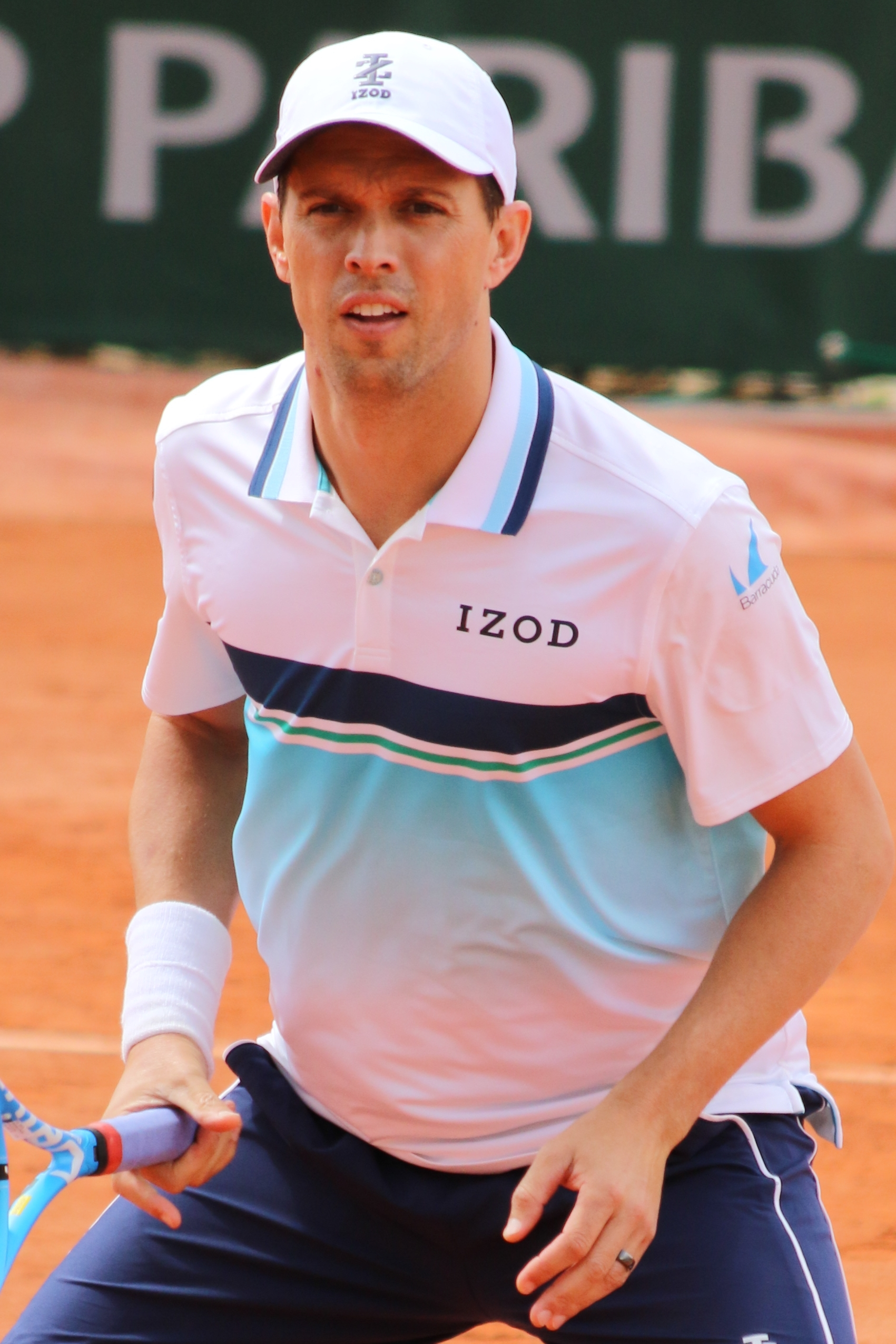
- Bryan at the 2019 French Open
- Full name: Michael Carl Bryan
- Country (sports): United States
- Residence: Wesley Chapel, Florida, US
- Born: April 29, 1978 (age 48) Camarillo, California, US
- Height: 1.91 m (6 ft 3 in)
- Turned pro: 1998
- Retired: 2020
- Plays: Right-handed (one-handed backhand)
- College: Stanford
- Coach: David Macpherson (2005–2016); Dušan Vemić (2016–2017); David Macpherson (2017–2020); Dave Marshall (2017–2020)
- Prize money: US$16,767,452: 47th all-time leader in earnings
- Int. Tennis HoF: 2025 (member page)
- Official website: bryanbros.com

Singles
- Career record: 5–11
- Career titles: 0
- Highest ranking: No. 246 (16 October 2000)

Grand Slam singles results
- US Open: 1R (2001)

Doubles
- Career record: 1150–373
- Career titles: 124
- Highest ranking: No. 1 (8 September 2003)

Grand Slam doubles results
- Australian Open: W (2006, 2007, 2009, 2010, 2011, 2013)
- French Open: W (2003, 2013)
- Wimbledon: W (2006, 2011, 2013, 2018)
- US Open: W (2005, 2008, 2010, 2012, 2014, 2018)

Other doubles tournaments
- Tour Finals: W (2003, 2004, 2009, 2014, 2018)
- Olympic Games: W (2012)

Mixed doubles
- Career titles: 4

Grand Slam mixed doubles results
- Australian Open: QF (2006, 2017)
- French Open: W (2003, 2015)
- Wimbledon: W (2012)
- US Open: W (2002)

Other mixed doubles tournaments
- Olympic Games: Bronze (2012)

Team competitions
- Davis Cup: W (2007)
Olympic medal record
Men's tennis
Representing United States
Olympic Games
Gold medal – first place	2012 London	Doubles
Bronze medal – third place	2008 Beijing	Doubles
Bronze medal – third place	2012 London	Mixed Doubles
Pan American Games
Bronze medal – third place	1999 Winnipeg	Doubles
- Last updated on: as of 22 March 2020.

Michael Carl Bryan (born April 29, 1978) is an American former professional tennis player. Widely regarded as one of the greatest doubles tennis players of all time, Bryan was ranked as the world No. 1 in men's doubles for a record 506 weeks, and finished as the year-end No. 1 a record ten times. Bryan won a record 128 ATP Tour-level doubles titles, including 22 majors: a record 18 in men's doubles, and four in mixed doubles. Alongside his twin brother Bob, the Bryan brothers were one of the most successful doubles partnerships in tennis history. The pair were named the ATP Team of the Decade for the 2000s. They became the second men's doubles team to complete the career Golden Slam at the 2012 London Olympics, and completed the double career Grand Slam. Mike Bryan also had success partnering Jack Sock, winning two majors and the 2018 ATP Finals, as well as the 2018 ATP World Tour Fans' Favorite Doubles Team.

The Bryan brothers retired from the sport together in August 2020. In 2025, they were inducted into the International Tennis Hall of Fame.

== Tennis career ==
=== College ===
Bryan played for Stanford University in 1997 and 1998, where he helped the Cardinal win back-to-back NCAA team championships. In 1998, he won the NCAA doubles title with his twin brother Bob.

=== Professional ===
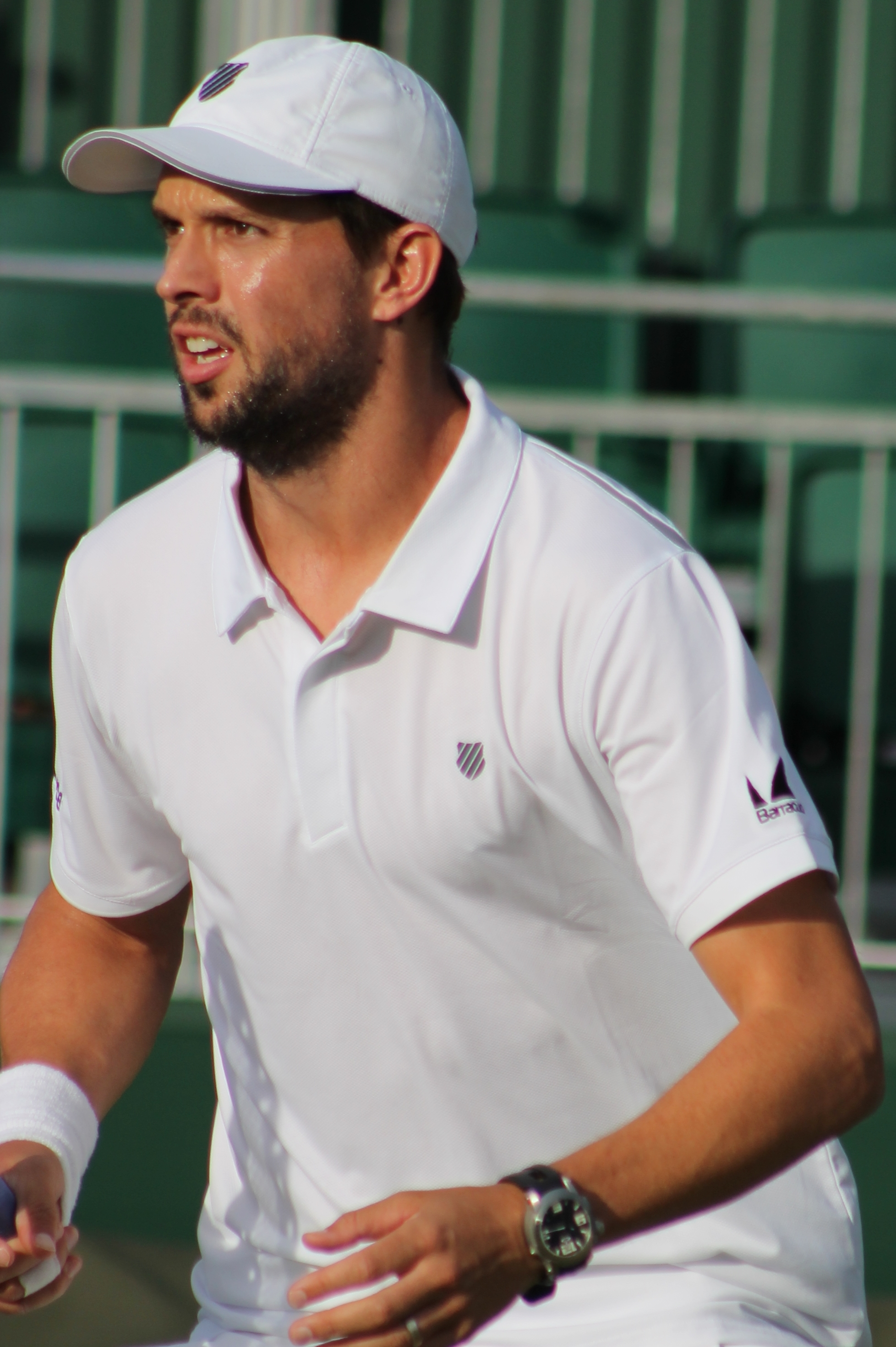
Bryan M., 2015

Together with his twin brother Bob, he was very successful in doubles. They won 119 doubles titles (winning their record-setting 86th title at the 2013 BNP Paribas Open in California, USA) including a record 16 Grand Slam titles. In 2005, he and Bob made it to the finals of all four Grand Slam tournaments, only the second time such a feat has been achieved in the Open era. The Bryan Brothers were ranked No. 1 in the ATP. Due to their success, they were nicknamed The Wonder Twins after a fictional comic book duo.

During the 2018 Madrid Open, Bob injured his hip and subsequently had season ending surgery. In his brother's absence, Bryan partnered with several other players, namely Sam Querrey at Roland Garros, Jack Sock at Queen's, Wimbledon and the US Open, Ryan Harrison during the Davis Cup, and with James Cerretani, Frances Tiafoe and Édouard Roger-Vasselin at other tour events.

== World TeamTennis ==
Both brothers kicked off their World TeamTennis careers back in 1999 for the Idaho Sneakers. They went on to play for the Newport Beach Breakers in 2004, the Kansas City Explorers from 2005 to 2012, the Texas Wild in 2013, the San Diego Aviators in 2014, the California Dream in 2015, the Washington Kastles from 2016 to 2018, and most recently the Vegas Rollers in 2019. They have two World TeamTennis titles, one from the Newport Beach Breakers in 2004, and another from the Kansas City Explorers in 2010. It was announced that Bryan, along with twin brother Bob, will be joining the Vegas Rollers during the 2020 WTT season set to begin July 12 at The Greenbrier.

== Davis Cup record (28–5) ==
Together with his twin brother Bob Bryan, the pair has won the most Davis Cup matches of any team in doubles for the United States. Bryan also owns U.S. Davis Cup records with 27 individual doubles wins and 32 ties played.

Year	Round	Opponent	Result
2003	Play-off	(Slovakia) Slovak Republic (Beck/Hrbatý)	W
2004	1st round	Austria (Knowle/Melzer)	W
2004	Quarterfinal	Sweden (Björkman/T.Johansson)	W
2004	Semifinal	Belarus (Mirnyi/Volchkov)	W
2004	Final	Spain (Ferrero/Robredo)	W
2005	1st round	Croatia (Ančić/Ljubičić )	L
2005	Play-off	Belgium (Rochus/Vliegen)	W
2006	1st round	Romania (Hănescu/Tecău)	W
2006	Quarterfinal	Chile (Capdeville/Garcia)	W
2006	Semifinal	Russia (Tursunov/Youzhny)	W
2007	1st round	Czech Republic (Dlouhý/Vízner)	W
2007	Quarterfinal	Spain (López/Robredo)	W
2007	Semifinal	Sweden (Aspelin/Björkman)	W
2007	Final	Russia (Andreev/Davydenko)	W
2008	1st round	Austria (Knowle/Melzer)	W
2008	Quarterfinal	France (Clément/Llodra)	L
2008	Semifinal (w/ Mardy Fish)	Spain (Lopez/Verdasco)	W
2009	1st round	Switzerland (Allegro/Wawrinka)	W
2009	Quarterfinal	Croatia (Karanusic/Zovko)	W
2011	1st round	Chile (Aguilar/Massú)	W
2011	Semifinal	Spain (Granollers/Verdasco)	W
2012	1st round (w/ Mardy Fish)	Switzerland (Federer/Wawrinka)	W
2012	Quarterfinal	France (Benneteau/Llodra)	W
2012	Semifinal	Spain (Granollers/López)	W
2013	1st round	Brazil (Melo/Soares)	L
2013	Quarterfinal	Serbia (Zimonjić/Bozoljac)	L
2014	1st round	(United Kingdom) Great Britain (Fleming/Inglot)	W
2014	Play-off	Slovakia (Lacko/Gombos)	W
2015	1st round	(United Kingdom) Great Britain (Inglot/Murray)	W
2016	1st round	Australia (Hewitt/Peers)	W
2016	Quarterfinal	Croatia (Čilić/Dodig)	L
2018	Semifinal (w/ Ryan Harrison)	Croatia (Dodig/Pavić)	W
2020	Qualifying round	Uzbekistan (Fayziev/Istomin)	W

== Grand Slam finals ==
=== Doubles: 32 (18 titles, 14 runner-ups) ===
By winning the 2006 Wimbledon title, Bryan completed the men's doubles Career Grand Slam. He became the 19th individual player and, with Bob Bryan, the seventh doubles pair to achieve this. In 2012, by winning the Olympic gold medal, along with his brother, Bryan completed the career "Golden Slam", as did Bob. They are the only team that has ever accomplished this.

Result	Year	Championship	Surface	Partner	Opponents	Score
Win	2003	French Open	Clay	(United States) Bob Bryan	(Netherlands) Paul Haarhuis (Russia) Yevgeny Kafelnikov	7–6^{(7–3)}, 6–3
Loss	2003	US Open	Hard	(United States) Bob Bryan	(Sweden) Jonas Björkman (Australia) Todd Woodbridge	7–5, 0–6, 5–7
Loss	2004	Australian Open	Hard	(United States) Bob Bryan	(France) Michaël Llodra (France) Fabrice Santoro	6–7^{(4–7)}, 3–6
Loss	2005	Australian Open (2)	Hard	(United States) Bob Bryan	(Zimbabwe) Wayne Black (Zimbabwe) Kevin Ullyett	4–6, 4–6
Loss	2005	French Open	Clay	(United States) Bob Bryan	(Sweden) Jonas Björkman (Belarus) Max Mirnyi	6–2, 1–6, 4–6
Loss	2005	Wimbledon	Grass	(United States) Bob Bryan	(Australia) Stephen Huss (South Africa) Wesley Moodie	6–7^{(4–7)}, 3–6, 7–6^{(7–2)}, 3–6
Win	2005	US Open	Hard	(United States) Bob Bryan	(Sweden) Jonas Björkman (Belarus) Max Mirnyi	6–1, 6–4
Win	2006	Australian Open	Hard	(United States) Bob Bryan	(Czech Republic) Martin Damm (India) Leander Paes	4–6, 6–3, 6–4
Loss	2006	French Open (2)	Clay	(United States) Bob Bryan	(Sweden) Jonas Björkman (Belarus) Max Mirnyi	7–6^{(7–5)}, 4–6, 5–7
Win	2006	Wimbledon	Grass	(United States) Bob Bryan	(France) Fabrice Santoro (Serbia) Nenad Zimonjić	6–4, 4–6, 6–4, 6–2
Win	2007	Australian Open (2)	Hard	(United States) Bob Bryan	(Sweden) Jonas Björkman (Belarus) Max Mirnyi	7–5, 7–5
Loss	2007	Wimbledon (2)	Grass	(United States) Bob Bryan	(France) Arnaud Clément (France) Michaël Llodra	7–6^{(7–5)}, 3–6, 4–6, 4–6
Win	2008	US Open (2)	Hard	(United States) Bob Bryan	(Czech Republic) Lukáš Dlouhý (India) Leander Paes	7–6^{(7–5)}, 7–6^{(12–10)}
Win	2009	Australian Open (3)	Hard	(United States) Bob Bryan	(India) Mahesh Bhupathi (The Bahamas) Mark Knowles	2–6, 7–5, 6–0
Loss	2009	Wimbledon (3)	Grass	(United States) Bob Bryan	(Canada) Daniel Nestor (Serbia) Nenad Zimonjić	6–7^{(7–9)}, 7–6^{(7–3)}, 6–7^{(5–7)}, 3–6
Win	2010	Australian Open (4)	Hard	(United States) Bob Bryan	(Canada) Daniel Nestor (Serbia) Nenad Zimonjić	6–3, 6–7^{(5–7)}, 6–3
Win	2010	US Open (3)	Hard	(United States) Bob Bryan	(India) Rohan Bopanna (Pakistan) Aisam-ul-Haq Qureshi	7–6^{(7–5)}, 7–6^{(7–4)}
Win	2011	Australian Open (5)	Hard	(United States) Bob Bryan	(India) Mahesh Bhupathi (India) Leander Paes	6–3, 6–4
Win	2011	Wimbledon (2)	Grass	(United States) Bob Bryan	(Sweden) Robert Lindstedt (Romania) Horia Tecău	6–3, 6–4, 7–6^{(7–2)}
Loss	2012	Australian Open (3)	Hard	(United States) Bob Bryan	(India) Leander Paes (Czech Republic) Radek Štěpánek	6–7^{(1–7)}, 2–6
Loss	2012	French Open (3)	Clay	(United States) Bob Bryan	(Belarus) Max Mirnyi (Canada) Daniel Nestor	4–6, 4–6
Win	2012	US Open (4)	Hard	(United States) Bob Bryan	(India) Leander Paes (Czech Republic) Radek Štěpánek	6–3, 6–4
Win	2013	Australian Open (6)	Hard	(United States) Bob Bryan	(Netherlands) Robin Haase (Netherlands) Igor Sijsling	6–3, 6–4
Win	2013	French Open (2)	Clay	(United States) Bob Bryan	(France) Michaël Llodra (France) Nicolas Mahut	6–4, 4–6, 7–6^{(7–4)}
Win	2013	Wimbledon (3)	Grass	(United States) Bob Bryan	(Croatia) Ivan Dodig (Brazil) Marcelo Melo	3–6, 6–3, 6–4, 6–4
Loss	2014	Wimbledon (4)	Grass	(United States) Bob Bryan	(United States) Jack Sock (Canada) Vasek Pospisil	6–7^{(5–7)}, 7–6^{(7–3)}, 4–6, 6–3, 5–7
Win	2014	US Open (5)	Hard	(United States) Bob Bryan	(Spain) Marcel Granollers (Spain) Marc López	6–3, 6–4
Loss	2015	French Open (4)	Clay	(United States) Bob Bryan	(Croatia) Ivan Dodig (Brazil) Marcelo Melo	7–6^{(7–5)}, 6–7^{(5–7)}, 5–7
Loss	2016	French Open (5)	Clay	(United States) Bob Bryan	(Spain) Feliciano López (Spain) Marc López	4–6, 7–6^{(8–6)}, 3–6
Loss	2017	Australian Open (4)	Hard	(United States) Bob Bryan	(Finland) Henri Kontinen (Australia) John Peers	5–7, 5–7
Win	2018	Wimbledon (4)	Grass	(United States) Jack Sock	(South Africa) Raven Klaasen (New Zealand) Michael Venus	6–3, 6–7^{(7–9)}, 6–3, 5–7, 7–5
Win	2018	US Open (6)	Hard	(United States) Jack Sock	(Poland) Łukasz Kubot (Brazil) Marcelo Melo	6–3, 6–1

=== Mixed doubles: 6 (4 titles, 2 runner-ups) ===
Result	Year	Championship	Surface	Partner	Opponents	Score
Loss	2001	Wimbledon	Grass	(South Africa) Liezel Huber	(Slovakia) Daniela Hantuchová (Czech Republic) Leoš Friedl	6–4, 3–6, 2–6
Win	2002	US Open	Hard	(United States) Lisa Raymond	(Slovenia) Katarina Srebotnik (United States) Bob Bryan	7–6^{(11–9)}, 7–6^{(7–1)}
Win	2003	French Open	Clay	(United States) Lisa Raymond	(Russia) Elena Likhovtseva (India) Mahesh Bhupathi	6–3, 6–4
Loss	2008	Wimbledon	Grass	(Slovenia) Katarina Srebotnik	(Australia) Samantha Stosur (United States) Bob Bryan	5–7, 4–6
Win	2012	Wimbledon	Grass	(United States) Lisa Raymond	(Russia) Elena Vesnina (India) Leander Paes	6–3, 5–7, 6–4
Win	2015	French Open (2)	Clay	(United States) Bethanie Mattek-Sands	(Czech Republic) Lucie Hradecká (Poland) Marcin Matkowski	7–6^{(7–3)}, 6–1

== Year-end championship finals ==
=== Doubles: 7 (5 titles, 2 runner-ups) ===
Result	Year	Championship	Surface	Partner	Opponents	Score
Win	2003	Tennis Masters Cup, Houston	Hard	(United States) Bob Bryan	(France) Michaël Llodra (France) Fabrice Santoro	6–7^{(6–8)}, 6–3, 3–6, 7–6^{(7–3)}, 6–4
Win	2004	Tennis Masters Cup, Houston (2)	Hard	(United States) Bob Bryan	(Zimbabwe) Wayne Black (Zimbabwe) Kevin Ullyett	4–6, 7–5, 6–4, 6–2
Loss	2008	Tennis Masters Cup, Shanghai	Hard (i)	(United States) Bob Bryan	(Canada) Daniel Nestor (Serbia) Nenad Zimonjić	6–7^{(3–7)}, 2–6
Win	2009	ATP World Tour Finals, London (3)	Hard (i)	(United States) Bob Bryan	(Belarus) Max Mirnyi (Israel) Andy Ram	7–6^{(7–5)}, 6–3
Loss	2013	ATP World Tour Finals, London	Hard (i)	(United States) Bob Bryan	(Spain) David Marrero (Spain) Fernando Verdasco	5–7, 7–6^{(7–3)}, [7–10]
Win	2014	ATP World Tour Finals, London (4)	Hard (i)	(United States) Bob Bryan	(Croatia) Ivan Dodig (Brazil) Marcelo Melo	6–7^{(5–7)}, 6–2, [10–7]
Win	2018	ATP Finals, London (5)	Hard (i)	(United States) Jack Sock	(France) Pierre-Hugues Herbert (France) Nicolas Mahut	5–7, 6–1, [13–11]

== Summer Olympics finals ==
=== Doubles: 2 (1 gold medal, 1 bronze medal) ===
Result	Year	Championship	Surface	Partner	Opponents	Score
Bronze	2008	Beijing	Hard	(United States) Bob Bryan	(France) Arnaud Clément (France) Michaël Llodra	3–6, 6–3, 6–4
Gold	2012	London	Grass	(United States) Bob Bryan	(France) Michaël Llodra (France) Jo-Wilfried Tsonga	6–4, 7–6^{(7–2)}

=== Mixed doubles: 1 (1 bronze medal) ===
Result	Year	Championship	Surface	Partner	Opponents	Score
Bronze	2012	London	Grass	(United States) Lisa Raymond	(Germany) Sabine Lisicki (Germany) Christopher Kas	6–3, 4–6, [10–4]

== ATP Masters 1000 finals ==
=== Doubles: 59 (39 titles, 20 runner-ups) ===
Result	Year	Tournament	Surface	Partner	Opponents	Score
Win	2002	Canada (1)	Hard	(United States) Bob Bryan	(The Bahamas) Mark Knowles (Canada) Daniel Nestor	4–6, 7–6^{(7–1)}, 6–3
Loss	2003	Indian Wells	Hard	(United States) Bob Bryan	(South Africa) Wayne Ferreira (Russia) Yevgeny Kafelnikov	1–6, 4–6
Win	2003	Cincinnati (1)	Hard	(United States) Bob Bryan	(Australia) Wayne Arthurs (Australia) Paul Hanley	7–5, 7–6^{(7–5)}
Loss	2004	Hamburg	Clay	(United States) Bob Bryan	(Zimbabwe) Wayne Black (Zimbabwe) Kevin Ullyett	1–6, 2–6
Loss	2004	Madrid	Hard (i)	(United States) Bob Bryan	(The Bahamas) Mark Knowles (Canada) Daniel Nestor	3–6, 4–6
Loss	2005	Monte Carlo	Clay	(United States) Bob Bryan	(India) Leander Paes (Serbia and Montenegro) Nenad Zimonjić	W/O
Loss	2005	Rome	Clay	(United States) Bob Bryan	(France) Michaël Llodra (France) Fabrice Santoro	5–7, 4–6
Win	2005	Paris (1)	Hard (i)	(United States) Bob Bryan	(The Bahamas) Mark Knowles (Canada) Daniel Nestor	6–4, 6–7^{(3–7)}, 6–4
Loss	2006	Indian Wells	Hard	(United States) Bob Bryan	(The Bahamas) Mark Knowles (Canada) Daniel Nestor	4–6, 4–6
Loss	2006	Miami	Hard	(United States) Bob Bryan	(Sweden) Jonas Björkman (Belarus) Max Mirnyi	4–6, 4–6
Win	2006	Canada (2)	Hard	(United States) Bob Bryan	(Australia) Paul Hanley (Zimbabwe) Kevin Ullyett	6–3, 7–5
Loss	2006	Cincinnati	Hard	(United States) Bob Bryan	(Sweden) Jonas Björkman (Belarus) Max Mirnyi	6–7^{(5–7)}, 4–6
Win	2006	Madrid (1)	Hard (i)	(United States) Bob Bryan	(The Bahamas) Mark Knowles (Canada) Daniel Nestor	7–5, 6–4
Win	2007	Miami (1)	Hard	(United States) Bob Bryan	(India) Leander Paes (Czech Republic) Martin Damm	6–7^{(7–9)}, 6–3, [10–7]
Win	2007	Monte Carlo (1)	Clay	(United States) Bob Bryan	(France) Julien Benneteau (France) Richard Gasquet	6–2, 6–1
Loss	2007	Rome	Clay	(United States) Bob Bryan	(France) Fabrice Santoro (Serbia) Nenad Zimonjić	4–6, 6–7^{(4–7)}, [7–10]
Win	2007	Hamburg (1)	Clay	(United States) Bob Bryan	(Australia) Paul Hanley (Zimbabwe) Kevin Ullyett	6–3, 6–4
Loss	2007	Cincinnati	Hard	(United States) Bob Bryan	(Israel) Jonathan Erlich (Israel) Andy Ram	6–4, 3–6, [11–13]
Win	2007	Madrid (2)	Hard (i)	(United States) Bob Bryan	(Poland) Mariusz Fyrstenberg (Poland) Marcin Matkowski	6–3, 7–6^{(7–4)}
Win	2007	Paris (2)	Hard (i)	(United States) Bob Bryan	(Canada) Daniel Nestor (Serbia) Nenad Zimonjić	6–3, 7–6(^{(7–4)}
Win	2008	Miami (2)	Hard	(United States) Bob Bryan	(India) Mahesh Bhupathi (The Bahamas) Mark Knowles	6–2, 6–2
Win	2008	Rome (1)	Clay	(United States) Bob Bryan	(Canada) Daniel Nestor (Serbia) Nenad Zimonjić	3–6, 6–4, [10–8]
Loss	2008	Hamburg	Clay	(United States) Bob Bryan	(Canada) Daniel Nestor (Serbia) Nenad Zimonjić	4–6, 7–5, [8–10]
Loss	2008	Canada	Hard	(United States) Bob Bryan	(Canada) Daniel Nestor (Serbia) Nenad Zimonjić	2–6, 6–4, [6–10]
Win	2008	Cincinnati (2)	Hard	(United States) Bob Bryan	(Israel) Jonathan Erlich (Israel) Andy Ram	4–6, 7–6^{(7–2)}, [10–7]
Loss	2009	Monte Carlo	Clay	(United States) Bob Bryan	(Canada) Daniel Nestor (Serbia) Nenad Zimonjić	4–6, 1–6
Loss	2009	Rome	Clay	(United States) Bob Bryan	(Canada) Daniel Nestor (Serbia) Nenad Zimonjić	6–7^{(5–7)}, 3–6
Loss	2009	Cincinnati	Hard	(United States) Bob Bryan	(Canada) Daniel Nestor (Serbia) Nenad Zimonjić	6–3, 6–7^{(2–7)}, [13–15]
Win	2010	Rome (2)	Clay	(United States) Bob Bryan	(United States) John Isner (United States) Sam Querrey	6–2, 6–3
Win	2010	Madrid (3)	Clay	(United States) Bob Bryan	(Canada) Daniel Nestor (Serbia) Nenad Zimonjić	6–3, 6–4
Win	2010	Canada (3)	Hard	(United States) Bob Bryan	(France) Julien Benneteau (France) Michaël Llodra	7–5, 6–3
Win	2010	Cincinnati (3)	Hard	(United States) Bob Bryan	(India) Mahesh Bhupathi (Belarus) Max Mirnyi	6–3, 6–4
Win	2011	Monte Carlo (2)	Clay	(United States) Bob Bryan	(Argentina) Juan Ignacio Chela (Brazil) Bruno Soares	6–3, 6–2
Win	2011	Madrid (4)	Clay	(United States) Bob Bryan	(France) Michaël Llodra (Serbia) Nenad Zimonjić	6–3, 6–3
Loss	2011	Canada	Hard	(United States) Bob Bryan	(France) Michaël Llodra (Serbia) Nenad Zimonjić	4–6, 7–6^{(7–5)}, [5–10]
Win	2012	Monte Carlo (3)	Clay	(United States) Bob Bryan	(Belarus) Max Mirnyi (Canada) Daniel Nestor	6–2, 6–3
Win	2012	Canada (4)	Hard	(United States) Bob Bryan	(Spain) Marcel Granollers (Spain) Marc López	6–1, 4–6, [12–10]
Win	2013	Indian Wells (1)	Hard	(United States) Bob Bryan	(Philippines) Treat Conrad Huey (Poland) Jerzy Janowicz	6–3, 3–6, [10–6]
Loss	2013	Monte Carlo	Clay	(United States) Bob Bryan	(France) Julien Benneteau (Serbia) Nenad Zimonjić	6–4, 6–7^{(4–7)}, [12–14]
Win	2013	Madrid (5)	Clay	(United States) Bob Bryan	(Austria) Alexander Peya (Brazil) Bruno Soares	6–2, 6–3
Win	2013	Rome (3)	Clay	(United States) Bob Bryan	(India) Mahesh Bhupathi (India) Rohan Bopanna	6–2, 6–3
Win	2013	Cincinnati (4)	Hard	(United States) Bob Bryan	(Spain) Marcel Granollers (Spain) Marc López	6-4, 4-6 [10-4]
Win	2013	Paris (3)	Hard (i)	(United States) Bob Bryan	(Austria) Alexander Peya (Brazil) Bruno Soares	6–3, 6–3
Win	2014	Indian Wells (2)	Hard	(United States) Bob Bryan	(Austria) Alexander Peya (Brazil) Bruno Soares	6–4, 6–3
Win	2014	Miami (3)	Hard	(United States) Bob Bryan	(Colombia) Juan Sebastián Cabal (Colombia) Robert Farah	7–6^{(10–8)}, 6–4
Win	2014	Monte Carlo (4)	Clay	(United States) Bob Bryan	(Croatia) Ivan Dodig (Brazil) Marcelo Melo	6–3, 3–6 [10-8]
Loss	2014	Madrid	Clay	(United States) Bob Bryan	(Canada) Daniel Nestor (Serbia) Nenad Zimonjić	6–4, 6–2
Win	2014	Cincinnati (5)	Hard	(United States) Bob Bryan	(Canada) Vasek Pospisil (United States) Jack Sock	6–3, 6–2
Win	2014	Shanghai Masters (1)	Hard	(United States) Bob Bryan	(France) Julien Benneteau (France) Édouard Roger-Vasselin	6–3, 7–6^{(7–3)}
Win	2014	Paris (4)	Hard (i)	(United States) Bob Bryan	(Poland) Marcin Matkowski (Austria) Jürgen Melzer	7–6^{(7–5)}, 5–7, [10–6]
Win	2015	Miami(4)	Hard	(United States) Bob Bryan	(Canada) Vasek Pospisil (United States) Jack Sock	6–3, 1–6, [10–8]
Win	2015	Monte Carlo (5)	Clay	(United States) Bob Bryan	(Italy) Simone Bolelli (Italy) Fabio Fognini	7–6^{(7–3)}, 6–1
Win	2015	Canadian Open (5)	Hard	(United States) Bob Bryan	(Canada) Daniel Nestor (France) Édouard Roger-Vasselin	7–6^{(7–5)}, 3–6, [10–6]
Win	2016	Rome (4)	Clay	(United States) Bob Bryan	(Canada) Vasek Pospisil (United States) Jack Sock	2–6, 6–3, [10–7]
Loss	2018	Indian Wells	Hard	(United States) Bob Bryan	(United States) John Isner (United States) Jack Sock	6–7^{(4–7)}, 6–7^{(2–7)}
Win	2018	Miami (5)	Hard	(United States) Bob Bryan	(Russia) Karen Khachanov (Russia) Andrey Rublev	4-6, 7-6^{(5)}, [10–4]
Win	2018	Monte Carlo (6)	Clay	(United States) Bob Bryan	(Austria) Oliver Marach (Croatia) Mate Pavic	7–6 ^{(7–5)}, 6–3
Loss	2018	Madrid	Clay	(United States) Bob Bryan	(Croatia) Nikola Mektić (Austria) Alexander Peya	3–5, retired
Win	2019	Miami (6)	Hard	(United States) Bob Bryan	(Netherlands) Wesley Koolhof (Greece) Stefanos Tsitsipas	7–5, 7–6^{(10–8)}

== Performance timelines ==
Key
W	F	SF	QF	#R	RR	Q#	P#	DNQ	A	Z#	PO	G	S	B	NMS	NTI	P	NH

(W) winner; (F) finalist; (SF) semifinalist; (QF) quarterfinalist; (#R) rounds 4, 3, 2, 1; (RR) round-robin stage; (Q#) qualification round; (P#) preliminary round; (DNQ) did not qualify; (A) absent; (Z#) Davis/Fed Cup Zonal Group (with number indication) or (PO) play-off; (G) gold, (S) silver or (B) bronze Olympic/Paralympic medal; (NMS) not a Masters tournament; (NTI) not a Tier I tournament; (P) postponed; (NH) not held; (SR) strike rate (events won / competed); (W–L) win–loss record.

=== Doubles ===
Tournament	1995	1996	1997	1998	1999	2000	2001	2002	2003	2004	2005	2006	2007	2008	2009	2010	2011	2012	2013	2014	2015	2016	2017	2018	2019	2020	SR	W–L	Win%
Grand Slam tournaments
Australian Open	A	A	A	A	A	1R	1R	QF	3R	F	F	W	W	QF	W	W	W	F	W	3R	3R	3R	F	SF	QF	3R	6 / 21	77–15	84%
French Open	A	A	A	A	2R	2R	2R	QF	W	SF	F	F	QF	QF	SF	2R	SF	F	W	QF	F	F	2R	1R	3R	A	2 / 21	68–19	78%
Wimbledon	A	A	A	A	3R	1R	SF	SF	QF	3R	F	W	F	SF	F	QF	W	SF	W	F	QF	QF	2R	W	3R	NH	4 / 21	78–17	82%
US Open	1R	1R	1R	1R	1R	QF	2R	SF	F	3R	W	3R	QF	W	SF	W	1R	W	SF	W	1R	QF	SF	W	3R	A	6 / 25	73–19	79%
Win–loss	0–1	0–1	0–1	0–1	3–3	4–4	6–4	14–4	14–3	13–4	21–3	18–2	17–3	16–3	19–3	16–2	16–2	20–3	22–1	16–3	10–4	13–4	11–4	16–2	9–4	2–1	18 / 88	296–70	81%
Year-end championship
ATP Finals	Did not qualify (DNQ)						RR	NH	W	W	SF	RR	A	F	W	SF	SF	RR	F	W	SF	SF	RR	W	DNQ		5 / 16	40–24	63%
National representation
Olympics	NH	A	Not Held			A	Not Held			QF	Not Held			SF-B	Not Held			G	Not Held			A	Not Held				1 / 3	11–2	85%
Davis Cup	A	A	A	A	A	A	A	A	PO	F	1R	SF	W	SF	QF	A	QF	SF	QF	1R	1R	QF	A	SF	A	QR	1 / 13	28–5	85%
ATP World Tour Masters 1000
Indian Wells	A	A	A	A	QF	1R	1R	QF	F	2R	SF	F	1R	QF	SF	1R	2R	QF	W	W	QF	QF	1R	F	2R	NH	2 / 21	42–18	70%
Miami	A	A	A	A	QF	3R	QF	3R	SF	SF	1R	F	W	W	SF	QF	2R	SF	1R	W	W	SF	SF	W	W	NH	6 / 21	63–15	81%
Monte Carlo	A	A	A	A	A	A	A	1R	QF	A	F	A	W	QF	F	QF	W	W	F	W	W	2R	A	W	A	NH	6 / 14	34–7	83%
Madrid (Note: Until 2001 held in Stuttgart (Hardcourt), 2002–2008 Hardcourt, 2009–present Clay)	A	A	A	A	A	A	2R	SF	1R	F	1R	W	W	QF	2R	W	W	2R	W	F	2R	QF	QF	F	1R	NH	5 / 19	34–14	71%
Rome	A	A	A	A	A	A	QF	1R	2R	SF	F	QF	F	W	F	W	QF	QF	W	SF	2R	W	SF	A	QF	A	4 / 18	36–14	72%
Canada	A	A	A	A	A	A	2R	W	SF	2R	SF	W	SF	F	SF	W	F	W	QF	2R	W	QF	QF	QF	QF	NH	5 / 19	40–14	74%
Cincinnati	A	A	1R	Q1	1R	1R	QF	QF	W	2R	2R	F	F	W	F	W	SF	SF	W	W	QF	SF	QF	2R	2R	A	5 / 22	40–17	70%
Shanghai	Not Held														QF	SF	QF	2R	SF	W	2R	SF	A	2R	A	NH	1 / 9	12–8	60%
Paris	A	A	A	A	A	A	1R	2R	1R	1R	W	SF	W	2R	QF	SF	2R	2R	W	W	QF	QF	QF	SF	A	A	4 / 18	24–14	63%
Hamburg	A	A	A	A	A	A	2R	1R	SF	F	QF	SF	W	F	NMS												1 / 8	16–7	70%
Win–loss	0–0	0–0	0–1	0–0	5–3	2–3	8–8	12–8	15–8	12–8	14–7	23–6	29–4	23–6	17–9	23–5	16–7	16–6	26–4	30–3	17–6	15–8	8–7	19–6	11–5	0–0	39 / 169	341–128	73%
Career statistics
	1995	1996	1997	1998	1999	2000	2001	2002	2003	2004	2005	2006	2007	2008	2009	2010	2011	2012	2013	2014	2015	2016	2017	2018	2019	2020	Career		
Tournaments	1	4	7	6	15	17	28	28	26	24	22	21	21	21	24	23	23	21	21	21	22	23	21	22	20	2	482		
Titles	0	0	0	0	0	0	4	7	5	7	5	7	11	5	7	11	8	7	11	10	6	3	2	5	2	1	124		
Finals	0	0	0	0	1	0	5	11	8	11	11	11	15	12	12	11	11	10	15	13	7	5	3	10	3	1	186		
Overall W–L	0–1	1–4	1–7	4–6	15–15	18–17	47–24	67–21	53–21	64–17	58–18	66–14	77–9	65–18	68–18	67–13	60–16	61–13	70–13	64–12	44–17	48–22	38–20	53–18	35–18	6–1	1150–373		
Win %	0%	20%	13%	40%	50%	51%	66%	76%	72%	79%	76%	83%	90%	78%	79%	84%	79%	82%	84%	84%	72%	69%	66%	75%	66%	86%	75.51%		
Year-end rank	1197	663	650	161	58	62	22	7	2	4	1	1	1	3	1	1	1	1	1	1	5	5	11	1	27	31	$16,767,452		

=== Mixed doubles ===
Tournament	1998	1999	2000	2001	2002	2003	2004	2005	2006	2007	2008	2009	2010	2011	2012	2013	2014	2015	2016	2017	2018	2019	2020	SR	W–L	Win%
Australian Open	A	A	A	A	2R	2R	A	A	QF	1R	A	A	A	A	1R	A	A	A	A	QF	A	A	A	0 / 6	8–6	57%
French Open	A	2R	A	A	1R	W	1R	A	1R	1R	A	A	A	A	QF	A	A	W	A	A	A	A	A	2 / 8	16–6	73%
Wimbledon	A	1R	2R	F	3R	QF	2R	QF	3R	2R	F	3R	A	1R	W	A	2R	SF	A	A	2R	A	NH	1 / 16	37–15	71%
US Open	A	1R	A	A	W	QF	A	SF	1R	2R	A	A	A	A	1R	A	A	A	A	A	A	A	A	1 / 7	14–6	70%
SR	0 / 0	0 / 3	0 / 1	0 / 1	1 / 4	1 / 4	0 / 2	0 / 2	0 / 4	0 / 4	0 / 1	0 / 1	0 / 0	0 / 1	1 / 4	0 / 0	0 / 1	1 / 2	0 / 0	0 / 1	0 / 1	0 / 0	0 / 0	4 / 37	75–33	69%

== Grand Slam seedings ==
The tournaments won by Bryan are in boldface, and advances into finals by Bryan are in italics .

=== Men's doubles ===
Legend (slams won / times seeded) seeded No. 1 (**11** / 36) seeded No. 2 (**4** / 15) seeded No. 3 (**2** / 8) seeded No. 4–10 (**1** / 15) Seeded outside the top 10 (0 / 3) not seeded (0 / 13)	Longest / total: 12 / 88; 3 / 88; 3 / 88; 5 / 88; 1 / 88; 9 / 88

Year	Australian Open	French Open	Wimbledon	US Open
1995	did not play	did not play	did not play	not seeded
1996	did not play	did not play	did not play	not seeded
1997	did not play	did not play	did not play	wild card
1998	did not play	did not play	did not play	wild card
1999	did not play	not seeded	not seeded	not seeded
2000	not seeded	not seeded	not seeded	not seeded
2001	not seeded	not seeded	15th	8th
2002	10th	5th	6th	6th
2003	2nd	**3rd (1)**	3rd	2nd (1)
2004	1st (2)	1st	2nd	2nd
2005	2nd (3)	3rd (4)	2nd (5)	**2nd (2)**
2006	**1st (3)**	1st (6)	**1st (4)**	1st
2007	**1st (5)**	1st	1st (7)	1st
2008	1st	1st	1st	**2nd (6)**
2009	**2nd (7)**	2nd	1st (8)	1st
2010	**1st (8)**	1st	2nd	**1st (9)**
2011	**1st (10)**	1st	**1st (11)**	1st
2012	1st (9)	2nd (10)	2nd	**2nd (12)**
2013	**1st (13)**	**1st (14)**	**1st (15)**	1st
2014	1st	1st	1st (11)	**1st (16)**
2015	1st	1st (12)	1st	1st
2016	3rd	5th (13)	2nd	3rd
2017	3rd	3rd (14)	5th	5th
2018	6th	16th	**7th (17)**	**3rd (18)**
2019	4th	7th	7th	7th
2020	13th	retired		

== ATP Tour career earnings ==
Year	Grand Slam doubles titles	ATP doubles titles	Total doubles titles	Earnings ($)	Money list rank
1997–98	0	0	0	$16,530	375
1999	0	0	0	$83,736	184
2000-01	0	4	4	$408,960	n/a
2002	0	7	7	$411,864	48
2003	1	4	5	$593,034	32
2004	0	7	7	$488,127	45
2005	1	4	5	$743,772	24
2006	2	5	7	$810,930	19
2007	1	10	11	$894,035	18
2008	1	4	5	$807,231	28
2009	1	6	7	$872,959	22
2010	2	9	11	$1,143,970	18
2011	2	6	8	$1,051,334	21
2012	1	6	7	$916,603	26
2013	3	8	11	$1,730,604	12
2014	1	9	10	$1,493,490
2015	0	6	6	$779,466
2016	0	3	3	$782,511
2017	0	2	2	$539,231
2018	2	3	5	$1,778,178
2019	0	2	2	$480,283	66T
2020	0	1	1	$38,356	[n/a]
Career*	18	106	124	$16,767,452	34

== Personal life ==
Bryan is married to Nadia née Murgašová, who is from Trenčín, Slovakia. The couple resides in Florida, and together they have a son. The family shares a summer residence in Trenčín, sharing the street with Stanley Cup winners Marián Hossa, Marián Gáborík and Zdeno Chára.

== See also ==
- Bob and Mike Bryan
- List of twins

Awards
Preceded by (The Bahamas) Mark Knowles & (Canada) Daniel Nestor (Serbia) Nenad Zimonjić & (Canada) Daniel Nestor (Poland) Łukasz Kubot & (Brazil) Marcelo Melo	ITF Men's doubles World Champion; 2003–07 (with (United States) Bob Bryan); 2009–14 (with (United States) Bob Bryan); 2018 (with (United States) Jack Sock)	Succeeded by (Serbia) Nenad Zimonjić & (Canada) Daniel Nestor (Netherlands) Jean-Julien Rojer & (Romania) Horia Tecău (Colombia) Juan Sebastián Cabal & (Colombia) Robert Farah
Preceded by (The Bahamas) Mark Knowles & (Canada) Daniel Nestor (The Bahamas) Mark Knowles & (Canada) Daniel Nestor (Serbia) Nenad Zimonjić & (Canada) Daniel Nestor	ATP Doubles Team of the Year (with (United States) Bob Bryan); 2003; 2005–07; 2009–14	Succeeded by (The Bahamas) Mark Knowles & (Canada) Daniel Nestor (Serbia) Nenad Zimonjić & (Canada) Daniel Nestor (Netherlands) Jean-Julien Rojer & (Romania) Horia Tecău
Preceded by None	ATP Fans' Favorite Team; 2006–17 (with (United States) Bob Bryan); 2018 (with (United States) Jack Sock); 2019 (with (United States) Bob Bryan)	Succeeded by Incumbent
Preceded by (United Kingdom) Andy Murray	Arthur Ashe Humanitarian of the Year (with (United States) Bob Bryan); 2015	Succeeded by (Croatia) Marin Čilić
Records
Preceded by (United States) John McEnroe	Most Weeks at World No. 1 (Doubles); December 12, 2011 – December 12, 2011 – November 5, 2012 (with (United States) Bob Bryan)	Succeeded by Incumbent
