= Kevin Ullyett =

Zimbabwean tennis player

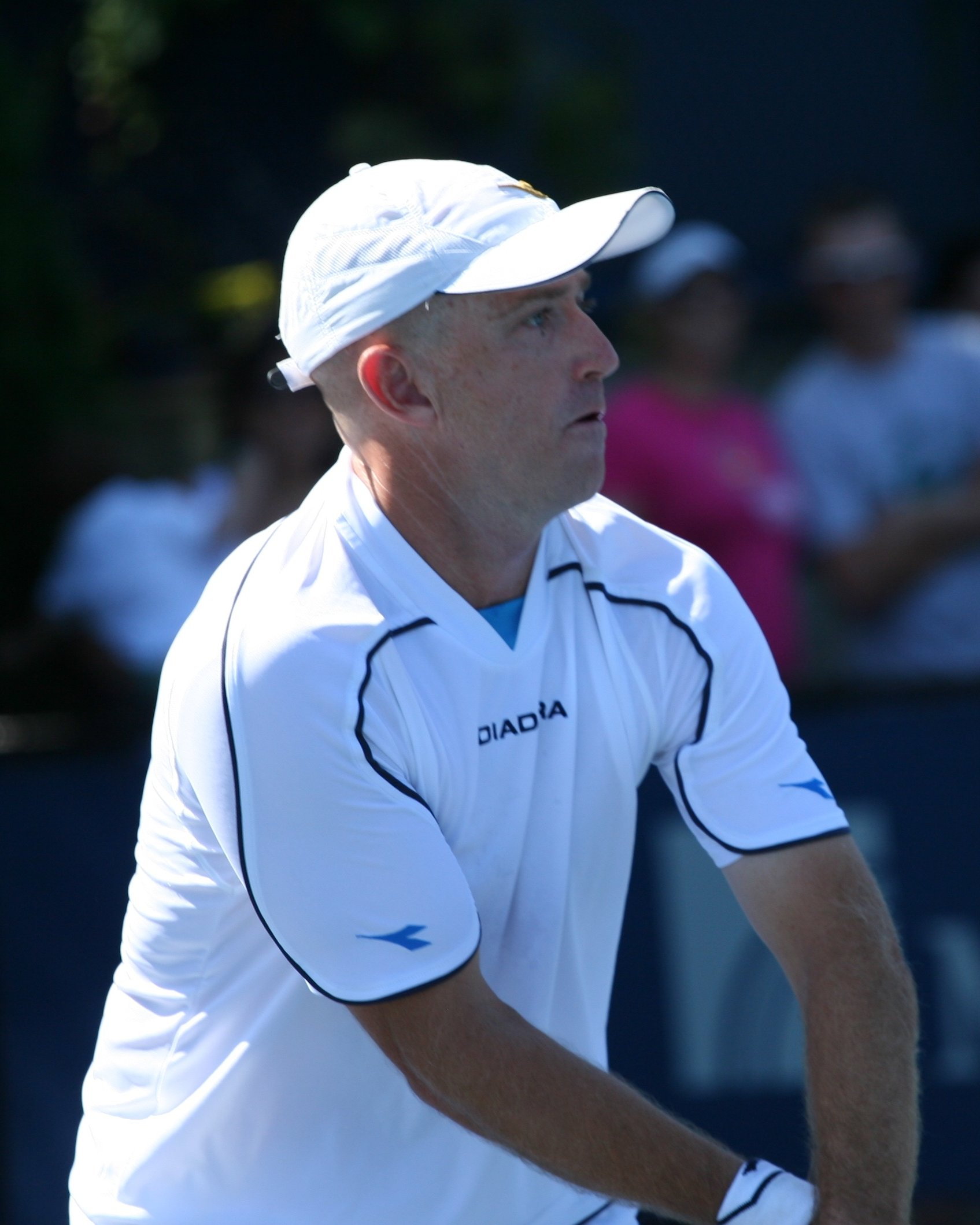
- Country (sports): Zimbabwe
- Residence: London, United Kingdom
- Born: 23 May 1972 (age 53) Salisbury, Rhodesia (now Harare, Zimbabwe)
- Height: 1.78 m (5 ft 10 in)
- Turned pro: 1990
- Retired: 2010
- Plays: Right-handed (one-handed backhand)
- Prize money: $4,138,771

Singles
- Career record: 21–34
- Career titles: 0; 5 Challenger, 0 Futures
- Highest ranking: No. 107 (22 May 2000)

Grand Slam singles results
- Australian Open: 2R (2000)
- French Open: Q1 (1993, 1997)
- Wimbledon: Q2 (1993, 1994, 1997)
- US Open: 2R (1993)

Doubles
- Career record: 502–310
- Career titles: 34; 15 Challenger, 0 Futures
- Highest ranking: No. 4 (31 January 2005)

Grand Slam doubles results
- Australian Open: W (2005)
- French Open: QF (2004, 2008, 2009)
- Wimbledon: F (2008)
- US Open: W (2001)

Other doubles tournaments
- Tour Finals: F (2004)
- Olympic Games: QF (2004)

Mixed doubles
- Career record: 53–40
- Career titles: 1

Grand Slam mixed doubles results
- Australian Open: W (2002)
- French Open: QF (2002, 2005, 2007)
- Wimbledon: F (2002)
- US Open: SF (2009)
- Last updated on: 5 May 2023.

Kevin Ullyett (born 23 May 1972) is a Rhodesian-born former professional tennis player from Zimbabwe. His primary success on the tour was in men's doubles.

Ullyett won 34 doubles titles during his career, including two Grand Slams at the 2001 US Open and the 2005 Australian Open with countryman Wayne Black. He also competed in the 2000 and 2004 Summer Olympics, coming in at fifth place in 2004 with Black. In mixed doubles, Ullyett won the 2002 Australian Open with Daniela Hantuchová. He reached the final of Wimbledon in 2002 with Hantuchová, and the semifinals there in 2003 and 2005 with Hantuchová and Liezel Huber, respectively. He and Huber were also the runners-up at the 2005 Australian Open.

Black, Ullyett's compatriot and long-time doubles partner, retired at the end of 2005. He then played with Paul Hanley for two seasons, then with Jonas Björkman, who retired at the end of 2008, and finally with Brazilian Bruno Soares.

His father, Robert Ullyett, represented Rhodesia (now Zimbabwe) in cricket and field hockey. He was part of the national team that competed at the 1964 Olympics (they beat New Zealand 2–1 and came 11th out of 15).

He made his final tennis appearance at the South African Open in February 2010 (partnering with Wesley Moodie) eighteen years after he first appeared there in 1992 competing in his first ATP Tour event. He had over 500 career wins.

He lives with his wife and two children in London. Their first child, Jemima, was born in 2005. He hopes for a career in property development after tennis.

== Grand Slam finals ==
=== Doubles (2 wins) ===
| Result | Year | Championship | Surface | Partner | Opponents | Score |
|---|---|---|---|---|---|---|
| Win | 2001 | US Open | Hard | (Zimbabwe) Wayne Black | (United States) Donald Johnson (United States) Jared Palmer | 7–6^{(11–9)}, 2–6, 6–3 |
| Win | 2005 | Australian Open | Hard | (Zimbabwe) Wayne Black | (United States) Bob Bryan (United States) Mike Bryan | 6–4, 6–4 |

=== Mixed doubles (1 win) ===
| Result | Year | Championship | Surface | Partner | Opponents | Score |
|---|---|---|---|---|---|---|
| Win | 2002 | Australian Open | Hard | (Slovakia) Daniela Hantuchová | (Argentina) Gastón Etlis (Argentina) Paola Suárez | 6–3, 6–2 |

== ATP career finals ==
=== Singles: 1 (1 runner-up) ===
| Legend Grand Slam Tournaments (0–0) ATP World Tour Finals (0–0) ATP Masters Series (0–0) ATP Championship Series (0–0) ATP World Series (0–1) | Finals by surface Hard (0–0) Clay (0–0) Grass (0–1) Carpet (0–0) | Finals by setting Outdoors (0–1) Indoors (0–0) |

| Result | W–L | Date | Tournament | Tier | Surface | Opponent | Score |
|---|---|---|---|---|---|---|---|
| Loss | 0–1 | Jun 1999 | Nottingham, United Kingdom | World Series | Grass | (France) Cédric Pioline | 3–6, 5–7 |

=== Doubles: 59 (34 titles, 25 runner-ups) ===
| Legend Grand Slam Tournaments (2–1) ATP World Tour Finals (0–1) ATP Masters Series (5–9) ATP Championship Series (4–7) ATP World Series (23–7) | Finals by surface Hard (22–16) Clay (6–4) Grass (3–1) Carpet (3–3) | Finals by setting Outdoors (20–20) Indoors (14–5) |

| Result | W–L | Date | Tournament | Tier | Surface | Partner | Opponents | Score |
|---|---|---|---|---|---|---|---|---|
| Loss | 0–1 | Jun 1996 | Seoul, South Korea | World Series | Hard | (United States) Kent Kinnear | (United States) Rick Leach (United States) Jonathan Stark | 4–6, 4–6 |
| Win | 1–1 | Feb 1997 | Shanghai, China | World Series | Carpet | (Belarus) Max Mirnyi | (Sweden) Tomas Nydahl (Italy) Stefano Pescosolido | 7–6, 6–7, 7–5 |
| Win | 2–1 | Apr 1998 | Orlando, United States | World Series | Clay | (South Africa) Grant Stafford | (Australia) Michael Tebbutt (Sweden) Mikael Tillström | 4–6, 6–4, 7–5 |
| Win | 3–1 | May 1998 | Coral Springs, United States | World Series | Clay | (South Africa) Grant Stafford | (The Bahamas) Mark Merklein (United States) Vince Spadea | 7–5, 6–4 |
| Win | 4–1 | Jul 1998 | Washington, United States | Championship Series | Hard | (South Africa) Grant Stafford | (South Africa) Wayne Ferreira (United States) Patrick Galbraith | 6–2, 6–4 |
| Win | 5–1 | Sep 1998 | Bournemouth, United Kingdom | International Series | Clay | (United Kingdom) Neil Broad | (Australia) Wayne Arthurs (Spain) Alberto Berasategui | 7–6, 6–3 |
| Loss | 5–2 | Oct 1998 | Basel, Switzerland | World Series | Hard | (South Africa) Piet Norval | (France) Olivier Delaître (France) Fabrice Santoro | 3–6, 6–7 |
| Loss | 5–3 | Jan 1999 | Doha, Qatar | World Series | Hard | (South Africa) Piet Norval | (United States) Alex O'Brien (United States) Jared Palmer | 3–6, 4–6 |
| Loss | 5–4 | Oct 1999 | Vienna, Austria | Championship Series | Carpet | (South Africa) Piet Norval | (Germany) David Prinosil (Australia) Sandon Stolle | 3–6, 4–6 |
| Win | 6–4 | Oct 1999 | Lyon, France | International Series | Carpet | (South Africa) Piet Norval | (South Africa) Wayne Ferreira (Australia) Sandon Stolle | 4–6, 7–6^{(7–5)}, 7–6^{(7–4)} |
| Win | 7–4 | Nov 1999 | Stockholm, Sweden | World Series | Hard | (South Africa) Piet Norval | (United States) Jan-Michael Gambill (United States) Scott Humphries | 7–5, 6–3 |
| Win | 8–4 | Aug 2000 | Long Island, United States | International Series | Hard | (United States) Jonathan Stark | (United States) Jan-Michael Gambill (United States) Scott Humphries | 6–4, 6–4 |
| Win | 9–4 | Oct 2000 | Hong Kong, Hong Kong | International Series | Hard | (Zimbabwe) Wayne Black | (Slovakia) Dominik Hrbatý (Germany) David Prinosil | 6–1, 6–2 |
| Win | 10–4 | Nov 2000 | St. Petersburg, Russia | International Series | Hard | (Canada) Daniel Nestor | (Japan) Thomas Shimada (South Africa) Myles Wakefield | 7–6^{(7–5)}, 7–5 |
| Win | 11–4 | Feb 2001 | Copenhagen, Denmark | International Series | Hard | (Zimbabwe) Wayne Black | (Czech Republic) Jiří Novák (Czech Republic) David Rikl | 6–3, 6–3 |
| Win | 12–4 | Aug 2001 | Long Island, United States | International Series | Hard | (United States) Jonathan Stark | (Czech Republic) Leoš Friedl (Czech Republic) Radek Štěpánek | 6–1, 6–4 |
| Win | 13–4 | Sep 2001 | New York, United States | Grand Slam | Hard | (Zimbabwe) Wayne Black | (United States) Donald Johnson (United States) Jared Palmer | 7–6^{(11–9)}, 2–6, 6–3 |
| Win | 14–4 | Jan 2002 | Adelaide, Australia | International Series | Hard | (Zimbabwe) Wayne Black | (United States) Bob Bryan (United States) Mike Bryan | 7–5, 6–2 |
| Win | 15–4 | Mar 2002 | San Jose, United States | World Series | Hard | (Zimbabwe) Wayne Black | (South Africa) John-Laffnie de Jager (South Africa) Robbie Koenig | 6–3, 4–6, [10–5] |
| Loss | 15–5 | May 2002 | Rome, Italy | Masters Series | Clay | (Zimbabwe) Wayne Black | (Czech Republic) Martin Damm (Czech Republic) Cyril Suk | 5–7, 5–7 |
| Win | 16–5 | Jun 2002 | Queen's, United Kingdom | International Series | Grass | (Zimbabwe) Wayne Black | (India) Mahesh Bhupathi (Belarus) Max Mirnyi | 7–6^{(7–5)}, 3–6, 6–3 |
| Win | 17–5 | Aug 2002 | Washington, United States | Championship Series | Hard | (Zimbabwe) Wayne Black | (United States) Bob Bryan (United States) Mike Bryan | 7–6^{(7–4)}, 4–6, 6–3 |
| Win | 18–5 | Oct 2002 | Lyon, France | International Series | Carpet | (Zimbabwe) Wayne Black | (The Bahamas) Mark Knowles (Canada) Daniel Nestor | 6–4, 3–6, 7–6^{(7–3)} |
| Win | 19–5 | Oct 2002 | Stockholm, Sweden | World Series | Hard | (Zimbabwe) Wayne Black | (Australia) Wayne Arthurs (Australia) Paul Hanley | 6–4, 2–6, 7–6^{(7–4)} |
| Loss | 19–6 | Mar 2003 | Dubai, United Arab Emirates | Championship Series | Hard | (Zimbabwe) Wayne Black | (India) Leander Paes (Czech Republic) David Rikl | 3–6, 0–6 |
| Win | 20–6 | May 2003 | Munich, Germany | World Series | Clay | (Zimbabwe) Wayne Black | (Australia) Joshua Eagle (United States) Jared Palmer | 6–3, 7–5 |
| Loss | 20–7 | Jul 2003 | Stuttgart, Germany | Championship Series | Clay | (Russia) Yevgeny Kafelnikov | (Czech Republic) Tomáš Cibulec (Czech Republic) Pavel Vízner | 6–3, 3–6, 4–6 |
| Loss | 20–8 | Oct 2003 | Moscow, Russia | World Series | Carpet | (Zimbabwe) Wayne Black | (India) Mahesh Bhupathi (Belarus) Max Mirnyi | 3–6, 5–7 |
| Loss | 20–9 | Oct 2003 | Madrid, Spain | Masters Series | Hard | (Zimbabwe) Wayne Black | (India) Mahesh Bhupathi (Belarus) Max Mirnyi | 2–6, 6–2, 3–6 |
| Loss | 20–10 | Mar 2004 | Indian Wells, United States | Masters Series | Hard | (Zimbabwe) Wayne Black | (France) Sébastien Grosjean (France) Arnaud Clément | 3–6, 6–4, 5–7 |
| Win | 21–10 | Apr 2004 | Miami, United States | Masters Series | Hard | (Zimbabwe) Wayne Black | (Sweden) Jonas Björkman (Australia) Todd Woodbridge | 6–2, 7–6^{(14–12)} |
| Win | 22–10 | May 2004 | Hamburg, Germany | Masters Series | Clay | (Zimbabwe) Wayne Black | (United States) Bob Bryan (United States) Mike Bryan | 6–4, 6–2 |
| Loss | 22–11 | Jul 2004 | Indianapolis, United States | Championship Series | Hard | (Zimbabwe) Wayne Black | (Australia) Jordan Kerr (United States) Jim Thomas | 7–6^{(9–7)}, 6–7^{(3–7)}, 3–6 |
| Loss | 22–12 | Nov 2004 | Paris, France | Masters Series | Carpet | (Zimbabwe) Wayne Black | (Sweden) Jonas Björkman (Australia) Todd Woodbridge | 3–6, 4–6 |
| Loss | 22–13 | Nov 2004 | Houston, United States | ATP Finals | Hard | (Zimbabwe) Wayne Black | (United States) Bob Bryan (United States) Mike Bryan | 6–4, 5–7, 4–6, 2–6 |
| Win | 23–13 | Jan 2005 | Melbourne, Australia | Grand Slam | Hard | (Zimbabwe) Wayne Black | (United States) Bob Bryan (United States) Mike Bryan | 6–4, 6–4 |
| Loss | 23–14 | Apr 2005 | Miami, United States | Masters Series | Hard | (Zimbabwe) Wayne Black | (Sweden) Jonas Björkman (Belarus) Max Mirnyi | 1–6, 2–6 |
| Loss | 23–15 | Aug 2005 | Washington, United States | Championship Series | Hard | (Zimbabwe) Wayne Black | (United States) Bob Bryan (United States) Mike Bryan | 4–6, 2–6 |
| Win | 24–15 | Aug 2005 | Montreal, Canada | Masters Series | Hard | (Zimbabwe) Wayne Black | (Israel) Jonathan Erlich (Israel) Andy Ram | 7–6^{(7–2)}, 6–4 |
| Loss | 24–16 | Aug 2005 | Cincinnati, United States | Masters Series | Hard | (Zimbabwe) Wayne Black | (Sweden) Jonas Björkman (Belarus) Max Mirnyi | 4–6, 7–5, 2–6 |
| Loss | 24–17 | Jan 2006 | Adelaide, Australia | International Series | Hard | (Australia) Paul Hanley | (Israel) Jonathan Erlich (Israel) Andy Ram | 6–7^{(4–7)}, 6–7^{(10–12)} |
| Win | 25–17 | Feb 2006 | Rotterdam, Netherlands | Championship Series | Hard | (Australia) Paul Hanley | (Israel) Jonathan Erlich (Israel) Andy Ram | 7–6^{(7–4)}, 7–6^{(7–2)} |
| Win | 26–17 | Mar 2006 | Dubai, United Arab Emirates | Championship Series | Hard | (Australia) Paul Hanley | (The Bahamas) Mark Knowles (Canada) Daniel Nestor | 1–6, 6–2, [10–1] |
| Win | 27–17 | May 2006 | Hamburg, Germany | Masters Series | Clay | (Australia) Paul Hanley | (The Bahamas) Mark Knowles (Canada) Daniel Nestor | 4–6, 7–6^{(7–5)}, [10–4] |
| Win | 28–17 | Jun 2006 | Queen's, United Kingdom | International Series | Grass | (Australia) Paul Hanley | (Sweden) Jonas Björkman (Belarus) Max Mirnyi | 6–4, 3–6, [10–8] |
| Loss | 28–18 | Aug 2006 | Washington, United States | Championship Series | Hard | (Australia) Paul Hanley | (United States) Bob Bryan (United States) Mike Bryan | 3–6, 7–5, [3–10] |
| Loss | 28–19 | Aug 2006 | Montreal, Canada | Masters Series | Hard | (Australia) Paul Hanley | (United States) Bob Bryan (United States) Mike Bryan | 5–7, 1–6 |
| Win | 29–19 | Oct 2006 | Stockholm, Sweden | World Series | Hard | (Australia) Paul Hanley | (Belgium) Olivier Rochus (Belgium) Kristof Vliegen | 7–6^{(7–2)}, 6–4 |
| Win | 30–19 | Jan 2007 | Sydney, Australia | World Series | Hard | (Australia) Paul Hanley | (The Bahamas) Mark Knowles (Canada) Daniel Nestor | 6–4, 6–7^{(3–7)}, [10–6] |
| Loss | 30–20 | May 2007 | Hamburg, Germany | Masters Series | Clay | (Australia) Paul Hanley | (United States) Bob Bryan (United States) Mike Bryan | 3–6, 4–6 |
| Loss | 30–21 | Aug 2007 | Toronto, Canada | Masters Series | Hard | (Australia) Paul Hanley | (India) Mahesh Bhupathi (Czech Republic) Pavel Vízner | 4–6, 4–6 |
| Loss | 30–22 | Apr 2008 | Estoril, Portugal | World Series | Clay | (United Kingdom) Jamie Murray | (South Africa) Jeff Coetzee (South Africa) Wesley Moodie | 2–6, 6–4, [8–10] |
| Win | 31–22 | Jun 2008 | Nottingham, United Kingdom | World Series | Grass (Note: The final itself was played on indoor hard due to rain.) | (Brazil) Bruno Soares | (South Africa) Jeff Coetzee (United Kingdom) Jamie Murray | 6–2, 7–6^{(7–5)} |
| Loss | 31–23 | Jul 2008 | Wimbledon, United Kingdom | Grand Slam | Grass | (Sweden) Jonas Björkman | (Canada) Daniel Nestor (Serbia) Nenad Zimonjić | 6–7^{(12–14)}, 7–6^{(7–3)}, 3–6, 3–6 |
| Loss | 31–24 | Aug 2008 | Washington, United States | Championship Series | Hard | (Brazil) Bruno Soares | (France) Marc Gicquel (Sweden) Robert Lindstedt | 6–7^{(3–7)}, 3–6 |
| Win | 32–24 | Oct 2008 | Stockholm, Sweden | World Series | Hard | (Sweden) Jonas Björkman | (Sweden) Johan Brunström (Sweden) Michael Ryderstedt | 6–1, 6–3 |
| Win | 33–24 | Nov 2008 | Paris, France | Masters Series | Hard | (Sweden) Jonas Björkman | (South Africa) Jeff Coetzee (South Africa) Wesley Moodie | 6–2, 6–2 |
| Loss | 33–25 | Aug 2009 | New Haven, United States | 250 Series | Hard | (Brazil) Bruno Soares | (Austria) Julian Knowle (Austria) Jürgen Melzer | 4–6, 6–7^{(3–7)} |
| Win | 34–25 | Oct 2009 | Stockholm, Sweden | 250 Series | Hard | (Brazil) Bruno Soares | (Sweden) Simon Aspelin (Australia) Paul Hanley | 6–4, 7–6^{(7–4)} |

== ATP Challenger and ITF Futures finals ==
=== Singles: 8 (5–3) ===
| Legend ATP Challenger (5–3) ITF Futures (0–0) | Finals by surface Hard (4–1) Clay (0–0) Grass (0–1) Carpet (1–1) |

| Result | W–L | Date | Tournament | Tier | Surface | Opponent | Score |
|---|---|---|---|---|---|---|---|
| Win | 1–0 | Aug 1993 | Winnetka, United States | Challenger | Hard | (Venezuela) Maurice Ruah | 6–3, 6–2 |
| Loss | 1–1 | Oct 1994 | Ponte Vedra, United States | Challenger | Hard | (United States) Vince Spadea | 3–6, 4–6 |
| Win | 2–1 | Apr 1996 | Nagoya, Japan | Challenger | Hard | (Australia) Peter Tramacchi | 3–6, 6–2, 6–3 |
| Win | 3–1 | Oct 1996 | Monterrey, Mexico | Challenger | Hard | (United States) Alex O'Brien | 6–3, 7–6 |
| Loss | 3–2 | Mar 1997 | Magdeburg, Germany | Challenger | Carpet | (Czech Republic) Petr Luxa | 3–6, 6–2, 5–7 |
| Loss | 3–3 | Jun 1998 | Surbiton, United Kingdom | Challenger | Grass | (Italy) Gianluca Pozzi | 4–6, 3–6 |
| Win | 4–3 | Mar 2000 | Kyoto, Japan | Challenger | Carpet | (United Kingdom) Arvind Parmar | 6–7^{(3–7)}, 6–4, 6–4 |
| Win | 5–3 | May 2000 | Jerusalem, Israel | Challenger | Hard | (Italy) Gianluca Pozzi | 6–4, 6–3 |

=== Doubles: 22 (15–7) ===
| Legend ATP Challenger (15–7) ITF Futures (0–0) | Finals by surface Hard (14–7) Clay (0–0) Grass (0–0) Carpet (1–0) |

| Result | W–L | Date | Tournament | Tier | Surface | Partner | Opponents | Score |
|---|---|---|---|---|---|---|---|---|
| Win | 1–0 | May 1992 | São Paulo, Brazil | Challenger | Hard | (South Africa) Grant Stafford | (Mexico) Gerardo Martinez (United States) Tom Mercer | 7–6, 6–4 |
| Win | 2–0 | May 1992 | Itu, Brazil | Challenger | Hard | (South Africa) Grant Stafford | (Haiti) Bertrand Madsen (United States) Tom Mercer | 6–1, 6–3 |
| Win | 3–0 | Aug 1993 | Cincinnati, United States | Challenger | Hard | (South Africa) Johan de Beer | (Australia) Wayne Arthurs (India) Leander Paes | 7–6, 6–4 |
| Win | 4–0 | Aug 1993 | Bronx, United States | Challenger | Hard | (South Africa) Johan de Beer | (Australia) Wayne Arthurs (Australia) Grant Doyle | 7–6, 7–6 |
| Win | 5–0 | Oct 1993 | Monterrey, Mexico | Challenger | Hard | (South Africa) Lan Bale | (France) Jean-Philippe Fleurian (The Bahamas) Roger Smith | 4–6, 6–2, 6–3 |
| Loss | 5–1 | Dec 1993 | Kuala Lumpur, Malaysia | Challenger | Hard | (South Africa) David Nainkin | (Canada) Sébastien Lareau (Canada) Daniel Nestor | 4–6, 4–6 |
| Win | 6–1 | May 1994 | Jerusalem, Israel | Challenger | Hard | (United States) Ellis Ferreira | (Belgium) Filip Dewulf (Belgium) Dick Norman | 7–6, 6–3 |
| Loss | 6–2 | Aug 1994 | Cincinnati, United States | Challenger | Hard | (Canada) Brian Gyetko | (Australia) Grant Doyle (Australia) Paul Kilderry | 3–6, 4–6 |
| Loss | 6–3 | Oct 1994 | Brest, France | Challenger | Hard | (United States) Bryan Shelton | (United States) Trevor Kronemann (Australia) David Macpherson | 1–6, 4–6 |
| Win | 7–3 | Apr 1995 | Nagoya, Japan | Challenger | Hard | (India) Leander Paes | (Australia) Joshua Eagle (Australia) Andrew Kratzmann | 7–6, 7–5 |
| Loss | 7–4 | Oct 1996 | Monterrey, Mexico | Challenger | Hard | (South Africa) Myles Wakefield | (Armenia) Sargis Sargsian (United States) Michael Sell | 2–6, 6–3, 3–6 |
| Win | 8–4 | Dec 1996 | Amarillo, United States | Challenger | Hard | (Belarus) Max Mirnyi | (United States) Justin Gimelstob (United States) Jeff Salzenstein | 6–3, 6–4 |
| Win | 9–4 | Feb 1997 | Cherbourg, France | Challenger | Hard | (Belarus) Max Mirnyi | (Italy) Stefano Pescosolido (Italy) Vincenzo Santopadre | 6–3, 6–7, 6–4 |
| Loss | 9–5 | May 1997 | Jerusalem, Israel | Challenger | Hard | (Zimbabwe) Wayne Black | (India) Mahesh Bhupathi (India) Leander Paes | 7–6, 2–6, 6–7 |
| Win | 10–5 | Sep 1997 | Urbana, United States | Challenger | Hard | (United States) Michael Sell | (Japan) Gouichi Motomura (Japan) Takao Suzuki | 3–6, 7–6, 6–2 |
| Win | 11–5 | Sep 1997 | Delray Beach, United States | Challenger | Hard | (United States) Michael Sell | (United States) Oren Motevassel (Italy) Daniele Musa | 6–3, 6–3 |
| Loss | 11–6 | Mar 1998 | Ho Chi Minh City, Vietnam | Challenger | Hard | (Belarus) Max Mirnyi | (India) Mahesh Bhupathi (Australia) Peter Tramacchi | 4–6, 0–6 |
| Win | 12–6 | Mar 1998 | Bangkok, Thailand | Challenger | Hard | (Australia) Peter Tramacchi | (Hungary) Gábor Köves (Hungary) Attila Sávolt | 6–4, 6–3 |
| Win | 13–6 | Mar 1998 | Kyoto, Japan | Challenger | Carpet | (Japan) Takao Suzuki | (Mexico) Óscar Ortiz (Venezuela) Maurice Ruah | 4–6, 6–1, 6–4 |
| Loss | 13–7 | Feb 2000 | Ho Chi Minh City, Vietnam | Challenger | Hard | (Georgia (country)) Irakli Labadze | (Australia) Michael Hill (Australia) Todd Woodbridge | 3–6, 4–6 |
| Win | 14–7 | May 2000 | Jerusalem, Israel | Challenger | Hard | (South Africa) Neville Godwin | (Israel) Noam Behr (Israel) Eyal Ran | 7–6^{(7–4)}, 7–6^{(7–3)} |
| Win | 15–7 | Feb 2008 | East London, South Africa | Challenger | Hard | (Sweden) Jonas Björkman | (Sweden) Thomas Johansson (Austria) Stefan Koubek | 6–2, 6–2 |

== Performance Timelines ==
Key
| W | F | SF | QF | #R | RR | Q# | P# | DNQ | A | Z# | PO | G | S | B | NMS | NTI | P | NH |

(W) winner; (F) finalist; (SF) semifinalist; (QF) quarterfinalist; (#R) rounds 4, 3, 2, 1; (RR) round-robin stage; (Q#) qualification round; (P#) preliminary round; (DNQ) did not qualify; (A) absent; (Z#) Davis/Fed Cup Zonal Group (with number indication) or (PO) play-off; (G) gold, (S) silver or (B) bronze Olympic/Paralympic medal; (NMS) not a Masters tournament; (NTI) not a Tier I tournament; (P) postponed; (NH) not held; (SR) strike rate (events won / competed); (W–L) win–loss record.

=== Singles ===
| Tournament | 1992 | 1993 | 1994 | 1995 | 1996 | 1997 | 1998 | 1999 | 2000 | 2001 | SR | W–L | Win % |
|---|---|---|---|---|---|---|---|---|---|---|---|---|---|
Grand Slam Tournaments
| Australian Open | A | A | Q1 | Q3 | A | Q2 | Q1 | Q1 | 2R | Q2 | 0 / 1 | 1–1 | 50% |
| French Open | A | Q1 | A | A | A | Q1 | A | A | A | A | 0 / 0 | 0–0 | – |
| Wimbledon | Q1 | Q2 | Q2 | Q1 | A | Q2 | Q1 | A | Q1 | A | 0 / 0 | 0–0 | – |
| US Open | Q1 | 2R | 1R | A | A | Q1 | Q2 | Q1 | A | A | 0 / 2 | 1–2 | 33% |
| Win–loss | 0–0 | 1–1 | 0–1 | 0–0 | 0–0 | 0–0 | 0–0 | 0–0 | 1–1 | 0–0 | 0 / 3 | 2–3 | 40% |
ATP Tour Masters 1000
| Indian Wells | A | A | Q2 | Q2 | A | A | A | A | A | A | 0 / 0 | 0–0 | – |
| Miami | A | A | 1R | Q3 | A | A | A | A | Q1 | A | 0 / 1 | 0–1 | 0% |
| Canada | A | A | A | A | Q1 | A | Q2 | 2R | A | A | 0 / 1 | 1–1 | 50% |
| Cincinnati | 1R | Q1 | Q2 | A | A | 1R | Q1 | Q1 | Q1 | A | 0 / 2 | 0–2 | 0% |
| Paris | A | A | A | A | Q1 | A | A | A | A | A | 0 / 0 | 0–0 | – |
| Win–loss | 0–1 | 0–0 | 0–1 | 0–0 | 0–0 | 0–1 | 0–0 | 1–1 | 0–0 | 0–0 | 0 / 4 | 1–4 | 20% |

=== Doubles ===
| Tournament | 1993 | 1994 | 1995 | 1996 | 1997 | 1998 | 1999 | 2000 | 2001 | 2002 | 2003 | 2004 | 2005 | 2006 | 2007 | 2008 | 2009 | 2010 | SR | W–L | Win % |
|---|---|---|---|---|---|---|---|---|---|---|---|---|---|---|---|---|---|---|---|---|---|
Grand Slam tournaments
| Australian Open | A | 1R | A | 2R | 2R | 1R | 1R | 2R | QF | QF | 3R | QF | W | SF | SF | 3R | 3R | A | 1 / 15 | 34–14 | 100% |
| French Open | A | 1R | A | 1R | 1R | 2R | 3R | 3R | 3R | 3R | 2R | QF | 1R | 2R | 2R | QF | QF | A | 0 / 15 | 21–15 | 58% |
| Wimbledon | Q3 | 1R | 1R | A | 1R | 2R | 3R | 1R | 1R | 2R | 3R | QF | SF | QF | 2R | F | QF | 1R | 0 / 16 | 25–16 | 61% |
| US Open | A | 1R | A | A | 1R | 2R | 1R | 1R | W | QF | 3R | QF | SF | SF | SF | 2R | 2R | A | 1 / 14 | 29–13 | 69% |
| Win–loss | 0–0 | 0–4 | 0–1 | 1–2 | 1–4 | 3–4 | 4–4 | 3–4 | 11–3 | 9–4 | 7–4 | 12–4 | 14–3 | 12–4 | 10–4 | 11–4 | 9–4 | 0–1 | 2 / 60 | 109–58 | 65% |
National Representation
| Summer Olympics | Not Held | | | A | Not Held | | | 1R | Not Held | | | QF | Not Held | | | A | NH | | 0 / 2 | 2–2 | 50% |
Year-End Championships
| ATP Finals | Did Not Qualify | | | | | | RR | Did Not Qualify | | | | F | SF | SF | SF | RR | DNQ | | 0 / 6 | 13–9 | 59% |
ATP Masters 1000 Series
| Indian Wells | A | SF | Q2 | A | A | A | 2R | 1R | 1R | QF | 2R | F | QF | 1R | QF | QF | 1R | A | 0 / 12 | 17–12 | 59% |
| Miami | A | 2R | 1R | A | A | 2R | 2R | 3R | 3R | 3R | 2R | W | F | SF | QF | 2R | QF | A | 1 / 14 | 23–13 | 64% |
| Monte Carlo | A | A | A | A | A | A | 2R | 1R | 1R | A | SF | A | A | A | SF | SF | 2R | A | 0 / 7 | 7–7 | 50% |
| Hamburg | A | A | A | A | A | A | 2R | A | 2R | 1R | 2R | W | 2R | W | F | 2R | NMS | | 2 / 9 | 13–7 | 65% |
| Madrid | Not Masters Series | | | | | | | | | 2R | F | A | SF | SF | 2R | 2R | 2R | A | 0 / 7 | 11–7 | 61% |
| Rome | A | A | A | A | A | A | 1R | A | 1R | F | 2R | QF | 2R | QF | QF | SF | SF | A | 0 / 10 | 11–10 | 52% |
| Canada | A | A | A | A | A | 1R | 2R | 2R | 2R | 2R | 1R | 2R | W | F | F | QF | 2R | A | 1 / 12 | 15–11 | 58% |
| Cincinnati | Q2 | Q2 | A | A | 1R | 1R | 1R | 1R | 1R | 2R | 1R | 2R | F | 2R | QF | 2R | 2R | A | 0 / 13 | 5–13 | 28% |
| Shanghai | Not Masters Series | | | | | | | | | | | | | | | | 2R | A | 0 / 1 | 0–1 | 0% |
| Stuttgart | A | A | A | A | A | A | 1R | 2R | 2R | Not Masters Series | | | | | | | | | 0 / 3 | 1–3 | 25% |
| Paris | A | A | A | A | A | QF | 1R | 1R | SF | 2R | QF | F | SF | 1R | QF | W | 2R | A | 1 / 12 | 17–11 | 61% |
| Win–loss | 0–0 | 4–2 | 0–1 | 0–0 | 0–1 | 3–4 | 4–9 | 3–7 | 5–9 | 9–8 | 8–9 | 17–5 | 17–7 | 13–7 | 15–9 | 14–8 | 7–9 | 0–0 | 5 / 100 | 119–95 | 56% |
| Year-end ranking | 135 | 91 | 158 | 103 | 92 | 35 | 26 | 34 | 13 | 11 | 18 | 9 | 6 | 8 | 10 | 8 | 24 | – | Prize Money: S4,138,771 | | |

=== Mixed doubles ===
| Tournament | 1997 | 1998 | 1999 | 2000 | 2001 | 2002 | 2003 | 2004 | 2005 | 2006 | 2007 | 2008 | 2009 | SR | W–L | Win% |
|---|---|---|---|---|---|---|---|---|---|---|---|---|---|---|---|---|
Grand Slam tournaments
| Australian Open | A | A | 2R | A | 2R | W | SF | QF | F | 1R | SF | 1R | 1R | 1 / 10 | 19–9 | 68% |
| French Open | A | A | A | A | 1R | QF | 1R | 2R | QF | 1R | QF | 2R | 1R | 0 / 9 | 8–9 | 47% |
| Wimbledon | 1R | 2R | 2R | 1R | A | F | 3R | 2R | SF | 2R | 2R | QF | QF | 0 / 12 | 17–12 | 59% |
| US Open | A | A | 1R | A | 1R | 2R | 1R | 2R | QF | 2R | 2R | 1R | SF | 0 / 10 | 9–10 | 47% |
| Win–loss | 0–1 | 1–1 | 2–3 | 0–1 | 1–3 | 13–3 | 5–4 | 5–4 | 11–4 | 1–4 | 6–4 | 3–4 | 5–4 | 1 / 41 | 53–40 | 57% |

== Wins over top 10 players ==
=== Doubles ===
- He has a 46–68 record against players who were, at the time the match was played, ranked in the top 10.

| Type | 1994 | 1995 | 1996 | 1997 | 1998 | 1999 | 2000 | 2001 | 2002 | 2003 | 2004 | 2005 | 2006 | 2007 | 2008 | 2009 | 2010 | Total |
|---|---|---|---|---|---|---|---|---|---|---|---|---|---|---|---|---|---|---|
| Wins | 1 | 0 | 1 | 1 | 0 | 2 | 2 | 7 | 10 | 6 | 10 | 6 | 0 | 0 | 0 | 0 | 0 | 46 |

| # | Opponents | Rank | Event | Surface | Rd | Score | Partner | KUR |
|---|---|---|---|---|---|---|---|---|
1994
| 1. | (United States) Ken Flach (United States) Rick Leach | 16; 10 | Indian Wells, United States | Hard | 2R | 6–4, 3–6, 7–6 | (South Africa) John-Laffnie de Jager | 132 |
1996
| 2. | (Zimbabwe) Byron Black (Canada) Grant Connell | 4; 3 | Moscow, Russia | Carpet (i) | 1R | 7–5, 6–7, 6–4 | (Belarus) Max Mirnyi | 153 |
1997
| - | (United States) Brian MacPhie (Canada) Daniel Nestor | 75; 7 | Hong Kong, Hong Kong | Hard | QF | Walkover | (South Africa) Neville Godwin | 68 |
| 3. | (United States) Kelly Jones (United States) Alex O'Brien | 72; 7 | Ostrava, Czech Republic | Carpet (i) | 1R | 6–4, 6–0 | (South Africa) Grant Stafford | 81 |
1999
| 4. | (Zimbabwe) Wayne Black (Australia) Sandon Stolle | 21; 4 | Washington, United States | Hard | QF | 6–4, 6–4 | (South Africa) Piet Norval | 36 |
| 5. | (Zimbabwe) Wayne Black (Australia) Sandon Stolle | 17; 9 | Stockholm, Sweden | Hard (i) | SF | 3–6, 7–6^{(7–3)}, 6–4 | (South Africa) Piet Norval | 30 |
2000
| 6. | (United States) Rick Leach (United States) Alex O'Brien | 3; 5 | Davis Cup, Harare, Zimbabwe | Hard (i) | 1R | 7–6^{(7–4)}, 5–7, 0–6, 7–5, 7–5 | (Zimbabwe) Wayne Black | 32 |
| 7. | (Czech Republic) Jiří Novák (Czech Republic) David Rikl | 8; 9 | St. Petersburg, Russia | Hard (i) | SF | 3–6, 6–4, 6–4 | (Canada) Daniel Nestor | 36 |
2001
| 8. | (Australia) Joshua Eagle (Australia) Sandon Stolle | 25; 3 | Copenhagen, Denmark | Hard (i) | SF | 6–4, 6–4 | (Zimbabwe) Wayne Black | 33 |
| 9. | (Czech Republic) Jiří Novák (Czech Republic) David Rikl | 11; 9 | Copenhagen, Denmark | Hard (i) | F | 6–3, 6–3 | (Zimbabwe) Wayne Black | 33 |
| 10. | (Russia) Yevgeny Kafelnikov (Belarus) Max Mirnyi | 8; 7 | Rotterdam, Netherlands | Hard (i) | 1R | 7–6^{(13–11)}, 6–7^{(5–7)}, 6–3 | (Zimbabwe) Wayne Black | 28 |
| 11. | (Belarus) Max Mirnyi (Belarus) Alexander Shvets | 10; 410 | Davis Cup, Minsk, Belarus | Carpet (i) | 2R | 6–7^{(6–8)}, 7–5, 6–3, 7–6^{(7–5)} | (Zimbabwe) Wayne Black | 29 |
| 12. | (Czech Republic) Jiří Novák (Czech Republic) David Rikl | 6; 4 | US Open, New York, United States | Hard | 3R | 2–6, 6–2, 6–4 | (Zimbabwe) Wayne Black | 25 |
| 13. | (United States) Donald Johnson (United States) Jared Palmer | 3; 5 | US Open, New York, United States | Hard | F | 7–6^{(11–9)}, 2–6, 6–3 | (Zimbabwe) Wayne Black | 25 |
| 14. | (Belarus) Max Mirnyi (Australia) Sandon Stolle | 10; 7 | Paris, France | Hard (i) | QF | 6–4, 6–7^{(1–7)}, 6–3 | (Zimbabwe) Wayne Black | 11 |
2002
| 15. | (Australia) Joshua Eagle (Australia) Sandon Stolle | 22; 7 | Rotterdam, Netherlands | Hard (i) | QF | 6–4, 7–6^{(7–5)} | (South Africa) Chris Haggard | 14 |
| 16. | (India) Mahesh Bhupathi (United States) Jan-Michael Gambill | 4; 90 | Indian Wells, United States | Hard | 2R | 7–6^{(7–4)}, 6–2 | (Zimbabwe) Wayne Black | 13 |
| 17. | (Belarus) Max Mirnyi (Belarus) Vladimir Voltchkov | 6; 87 | Davis Cup, Harare, Zimbabwe | Hard (i) | 1R | 6–3, 7–6^{(7–4)}, 4–6, 7–6^{(14–12)} | (Zimbabwe) Wayne Black | 10 |
| 18. | (South Africa) John-Laffnie de Jager (India) Leander Paes | 64; 10 | Rome, Italy | Clay | 1R | 6–4, 6–2 | (Zimbabwe) Wayne Black | 9 |
| 19. | (India) Mahesh Bhupathi (Belarus) Max Mirnyi | 6; 5 | Rome, Italy | Clay | QF | 4–6, 6–4, [10–3] | (Zimbabwe) Wayne Black | 9 |
| 20. | (Australia) Joshua Eagle (Australia) Sandon Stolle | 33; 7 | Rome, Italy | Clay | SF | 6–4, 6–3 | (Zimbabwe) Wayne Black | 9 |
| 21. | (United States) Donald Johnson (United States) Jared Palmer | 1; 1 | Queen's Club, London, United Kingdom | Grass | SF | 7–5, 6–7^{(3–7)}, 7–6^{(7–5)} | (Zimbabwe) Wayne Black | 7 |
| 22. | (India) Mahesh Bhupathi (Belarus) Max Mirnyi | 6; 5 | Queen's Club, London, United Kingdom | Grass | F | 7–5, 6–3 | (Zimbabwe) Wayne Black | 7 |
| 23. | (Czech Republic) Martin Damm (Czech Republic) Cyril Suk | 10; 17 | Washington, United States | Hard | SF | 6–4, 7–6^{(7–3)} | (Zimbabwe) Wayne Black | 9 |
| 24. | (The Bahamas) Mark Knowles (Canada) Daniel Nestor | 2; 1 | Lyon, France | Carpet (i) | F | 6–4, 3–6, 7–6^{(7–3)} | (Zimbabwe) Wayne Black | 13 |
2003
| 25. | (United States) Donald Johnson (United States) Jared Palmer | 12; 9 | Dubai, United Arab Emirates | Hard | QF | 7–5, 6–3 | (Zimbabwe) Wayne Black | 16 |
| 26. | (India) Mahesh Bhupathi (Belarus) Max Mirnyi | 5; 4 | Dubai, United Arab Emirates | Hard | SF | 6–4, 0–6, 7–6^{(7–4)} | (Zimbabwe) Wayne Black | 16 |
| 27. | (Belarus) Max Mirnyi (United States) Jared Palmer | 1; 20 | Stuttgart, Germany | Clay | SF | 6–4, 7–6^{(8–6)} | (Russia) Yevgeny Kafelnikov | 18 |
| 28. | (South Africa) Chris Haggard (Australia) Paul Hanley | 21; 10 | Madrid, Spain | Hard (i) | 1R | 6–4, 6–4 | (Zimbabwe) Wayne Black | 18 |
| 29. | (The Bahamas) Mark Knowles (Canada) Daniel Nestor | 7; 6 | Madrid, Spain | Hard (i) | 2R | 6–1, 6–7^{(5–7)}, 6–3 | (Zimbabwe) Wayne Black | 18 |
| 30. | (United States) Bob Bryan (United States) Mike Bryan | 2; 2 | Paris, France | Hard (i) | 1R | 7–6^{(7–3)}, 6–3 | (Zimbabwe) Wayne Black | 18 |
2004
| 31. | (India) Mahesh Bhupathi (Belarus) Max Mirnyi | 4; 3 | Indian Wells, United States | Hard | SF | 6–4, 6–4 | (Zimbabwe) Wayne Black | 18 |
| 32. | (Australia) Paul Hanley (France) Fabrice Santoro | 8; 7 | Miami, United States | Hard | QF | 6–1, 7–5 | (Zimbabwe) Wayne Black | 15 |
| 33. | (United States) Bob Bryan (United States) Mike Bryan | 1; 1 | Miami, United States | Hard | SF | 6–2, 7–5 | (Zimbabwe) Wayne Black | 15 |
| 34. | (Sweden) Jonas Björkman (Australia) Todd Woodbridge | 5; 6 | Miami, United States | Hard | F | 6–2, 7–6^{(14–12)} | (Zimbabwe) Wayne Black | 15 |
| 35. | (The Bahamas) Mark Knowles (Canada) Daniel Nestor | 8; 7 | Hamburg, Germany | Clay | QF | 6–2, 6–7^{(7–9)}, 7–6^{(7–5)} | (Zimbabwe) Wayne Black | 15 |
| 36. | (Sweden) Jonas Björkman (Australia) Todd Woodbridge | 3; 4 | Hamburg, Germany | Clay | SF | 6–2, 6–1 | (Zimbabwe) Wayne Black | 15 |
| 37. | (United States) Bob Bryan (United States) Mike Bryan | 1; 1 | Hamburg, Germany | Clay | F | 6–4, 6–2 | (Zimbabwe) Wayne Black | 15 |
| 38. | (The Bahamas) Mark Knowles (Canada) Daniel Nestor | 1; 1 | Paris, France | Hard (i) | QF | 6–4, 6–4 | (Zimbabwe) Wayne Black | 9 |
| 39. | (India) Mahesh Bhupathi (Belarus) Max Mirnyi | 6; 8 | Paris, France | Hard (i) | SF | 6–3, 6–4 | (Zimbabwe) Wayne Black | 9 |
| 40. | (Sweden) Jonas Björkman (Australia) Todd Woodbridge | 3; 6 | Masters Cup, Houston, United States | Hard (i) | SF | 6–4, 6–2 | (Zimbabwe) Wayne Black | 9 |
2005
| 41. | (India) Mahesh Bhupathi (Australia) Todd Woodbridge | 7; 4 | Australian Open, Melbourne, Australia | Hard | QF | 7–6^{(7–3)}, 6–3 | (Zimbabwe) Wayne Black | 8 |
| 42. | (United States) Bob Bryan (United States) Mike Bryan | 5; 5 | Australian Open, Melbourne, Australia | Hard | F | 6–4, 6–4 | (Zimbabwe) Wayne Black | 8 |
| 43. | (India) Leander Paes (Serbia and Montenegro) Nenad Zimonjić | 7; 11 | Wimbledon, London, United Kingdom | Grass | QF | 7–5, 7–6^{(10–8)}, 7–6^{(10–8)} | (Zimbabwe) Wayne Black | 9 |
| - | (The Bahamas) Mark Knowles (Czech Republic) Radek Štěpánek | 5; 41 | Washington, United States | Hard | SF | Walkover | (Zimbabwe) Wayne Black | 8 |
| 44. | (Sweden) Jonas Björkman (Belarus) Max Mirnyi | 1; 4 | Montreal, Canada | Hard | SF | 6–4, 3–6, 7–5 | (Zimbabwe) Wayne Black | 7 |
| 45. | (India) Leander Paes (Serbia and Montenegro) Nenad Zimonjić | 9; 11 | Cincinnati, United States | Hard | QF | 7–5, 6–7^{(6–8)}, 7–6^{(7–5)} | (Zimbabwe) Wayne Black | 7 |
| 46. | (France) Michaël Llodra (France) Fabrice Santoro | 10; 17 | Cincinnati, United States | Hard | SF | 4–6, 6–2, 6–2 | (Zimbabwe) Wayne Black | 7 |
