= Bob Bryan =

American tennis player (born 1978)

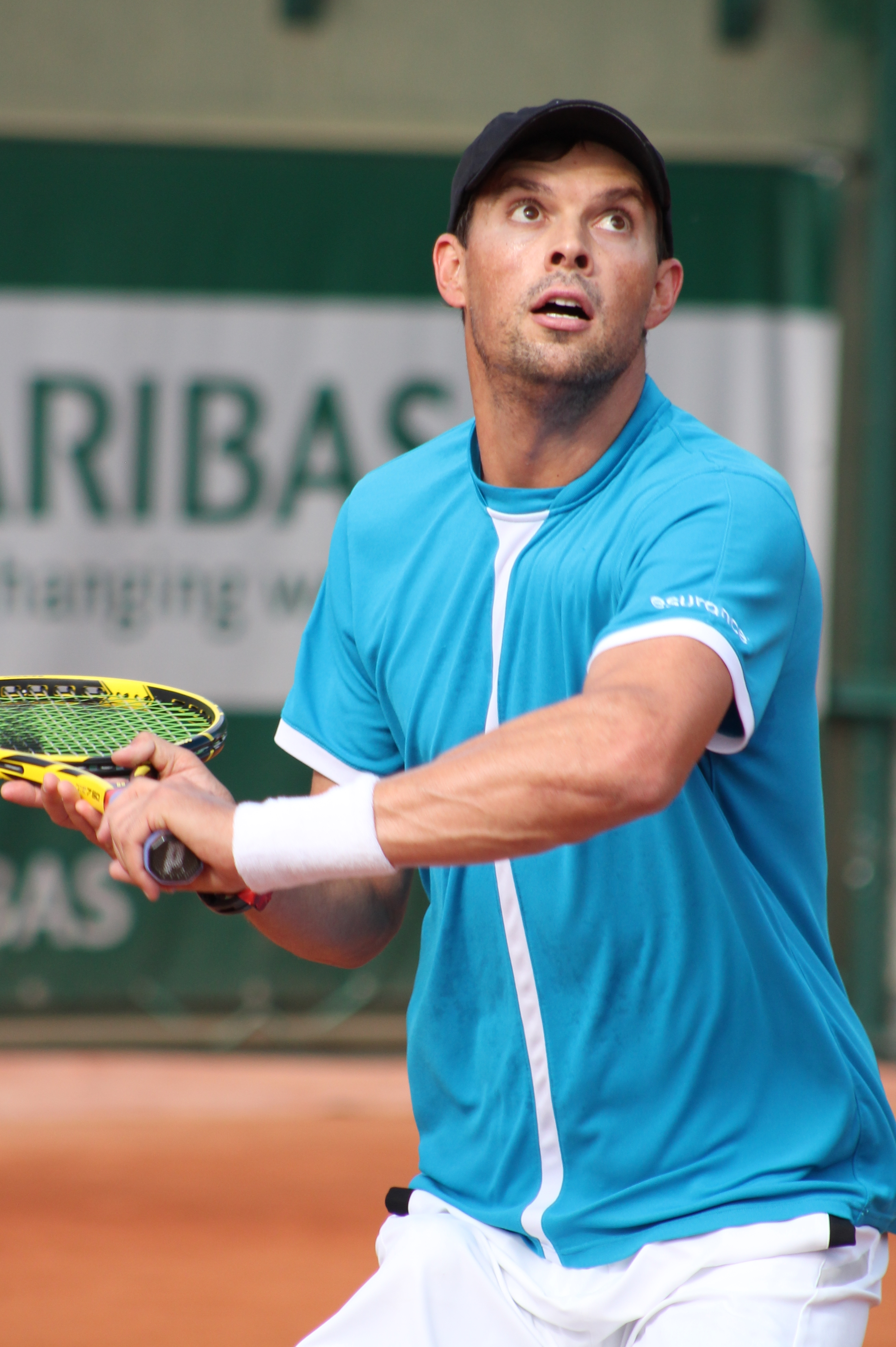
- Bryan at the 2015 French Open
- Full name: Robert Charles Bryan
- Country (sports): United States
- Residence: Sunny Isles Beach, Florida, US
- Born: April 29, 1978 (age 48) Camarillo, California, US
- Height: 1.93 m (6 ft 4 in)
- Turned pro: 1998
- Retired: 2020
- Plays: Left-handed (one-handed backhand)
- College: Stanford
- Coach: David Macpherson (2005–2016); Dušan Vemić (2016–2017); David Macpherson (2017–2020); Dave Marshall (2017–2020)
- Prize money: US$15,931,631: 52nd all-time leader in earnings
- Int. Tennis HoF: 2025 (member page)
- Official website: bryanbros.com

Singles
- Career record: 21–40
- Career titles: 0
- Highest ranking: No. 116 (13 November 2000)

Grand Slam singles results
- Australian Open: Q3 (2000)
- French Open: Q1 (2000)
- Wimbledon: 2R (2001)
- US Open: 2R (1998)

Doubles
- Career record: 1109–359
- Career titles: 119
- Highest ranking: No. 1 (8 September 2003)

Grand Slam doubles results
- Australian Open: W (2006, 2007, 2009, 2010, 2011, 2013)
- French Open: W (2003, 2013)
- Wimbledon: W (2006, 2011, 2013)
- US Open: W (2005, 2008, 2010, 2012, 2014)

Other doubles tournaments
- Tour Finals: W (2003, 2004, 2009, 2014)
- Olympic Games: W (2012)

Mixed doubles
- Career titles: 7

Grand Slam mixed doubles results
- Australian Open: QF (2002, 2005, 2006, 2007, 2013, 2016)
- French Open: W (2008, 2009)
- Wimbledon: W (2008)
- US Open: W (2003, 2004, 2006, 2010)

Other mixed doubles tournaments
- Olympic Games: 1R (2012)

Team competitions
- Davis Cup: W (2007)
Olympic medal record
Men's tennis
Representing United States
Olympic Games
Gold medal – first place	2012 London	Doubles
Bronze medal – third place	2008 Beijing	Doubles
Pan American Games
Bronze medal – third place	1999 Winnipeg	Doubles
- Last updated on: 22 March 2020.

Robert Charles Bryan (born April 29, 1978) is an American former professional tennis player. Widely regarded as one of the greatest doubles tennis players of all time, Bryan was ranked as the world No. 1 in men's doubles for 438 weeks (second-most of all time), and finished as the year-end No. 1 eight times. Bryan won 126 ATP Tour-level doubles titles, including 23 majors: 16 in men's doubles and seven in mixed doubles. Alongside his twin brother Mike, the Bryan brothers were one of the most successful doubles partnerships in tennis history. The pair were named the ATP Team of the Decade for the 2000s. They became the second men's doubles team to complete the career Golden Slam at the 2012 London Olympics.

The Bryan brothers retired from the sport together in August 2020. In 2025, they were inducted into the International Tennis Hall of Fame.

== Tennis career ==
=== Doubles records ===
- 16 Grand Slams (Open Era)
- 30 Grand Slam men's doubles finals
- 10-time ITF World Champions
- 116 ATP Titles and 169 ATP Finals
- 439 weeks at #1
- 1000+ team match wins
- 10 consecutive years of winning at least 1 Grand Slam
- 11 time ATP Fans' Favorite Doubles Team and ATP Team of the Decade
- "Bryan Golden Slam" (only team to simultaneously hold all Grand Slam titles and an Olympic gold medal)
- 7 consecutive Grand Slam finals (2005 Australian–2006 Wimbledon)
- 39 Masters 1000 titles
- "Career Golden Masters" (alongside Daniel Nestor only other players in history to win all nine Masters 1000 events)

=== Junior ===
He finished the year as the no. 1 ranked singles player in the nation in 1998 after winning the clay court nationals and reaching the finals of Kalamazoo. The brothers were back-to-back Kalamazoo doubles champions in 1995 and 1996 and won the US Open Junior doubles title in 1996.

=== College ===
He played for Stanford University in 1997 and 1998, where he helped the Cardinal win back-to-back NCAA team championships. In 1998, he won the "Triple Crown" by taking the NCAA singles, doubles (with his twin brother Mike), and team titles. He was the first man to accomplish this since Stanford's Alex O'Brien did it in 1992.

=== ATP Tour ===
With his twin brother Mike (who is the older by two minutes), Bryan has won 116 doubles titles, including sixteen Grand Slam titles. In 2005, the Bryan brothers made it to the finals of all four Grand Slam tournaments, only the second time a men's doubles team has done this during the open era. In 2006, the Bryan brothers won Wimbledon and the Australian Open and completed a Career Grand Slam. Having won the 2012 US Open, they followed up by winning the first three majors of 2013, and thus held all four titles at once. They could not complete the calendar year Grand Slam, however, as they lost in the semi-finals of the 2013 US Open.

The twins have been the year-ending top-ranked team ten times: in 2003, 2005, 2006, 2007, and then each year from 2009 to 2014 inclusive.

The Bryan brothers have been frequent participants on U.S. Davis Cup teams. The United States sealed its 32nd title at the 2007 Davis Cup.

In the 2018 Madrid Masters 1000 final, Bryan injured his hip, and the pair had to retire down 3–5 in the first set. He underwent a hip relining and made a remarkable recovery, rejoining his brother less than a year later for the 2019 Australian Open and making it to the quarterfinals. They won their first title since his surgery in February 2019 at Delray Beach.

== World TeamTennis ==
Both brothers kicked off their World TeamTennis careers back in 1999 for the Idaho Sneakers. They went on to play for the Newport Beach Breakers in 2004, the Kansas City Explorers from 2005 to 2012, the Texas Wild in 2013, the San Diego Aviators in 2014, the California Dream in 2015, the Washington Kastles from 2016 to 2018, and most recently the Vegas Rollers in 2019. They have two World TeamTennis titles, one from the Newport Beach Breakers in 2004, and another from the Kansas City Explorers in 2010. It was announced that Bryan, along with Mike, will be joining the Vegas Rollers during the 2020 WTT season set to begin July 12 at The Greenbrier.

== Personal life ==
Bryan married Florida attorney Michelle Alvarez in 2010; the couple have three children.

== Davis Cup record (26–5) ==
Together with his twin brother Mike Bryan, the pair has won the most Davis Cup matches of any doubles team for the United States. Bryan holds the record for most years played (14) in the Davis Cup for the U.S. He also holds a 4–2 career record in singles ties.

Year	Round	Opponent	Result
2003	Play-off	Slovakia (Beck/Hrbatý)	W
2004	1st round	Austria (Knowle/Melzer)	W
2004	Quarterfinal	Sweden (Björkman/T. Johansson)	W
2004	Semifinal	Belarus (Mirnyi/Voltchkov)	W
2004	Final	Spain (Ferrero/Robredo)	W
2005	1st round	Croatia (Ančić/Ljubičić)	L
2005	Play-off	Belgium (Rochus/Vliegen)	W
2006	1st round	Romania (Hănescu/Tecău)	W
2006	Quarterfinal	Chile (Capdeville/Garcia)	W
2006	Semifinal	Russia (Tursunov/Youzhny)	W
2007	1st round	Czech Republic (Dlouhý/Vízner)	W
2007	Quarterfinal	Spain (López/Robredo)	W
2007	Semifinal	Sweden (Aspelin/Björkman)	W
2007	Final	Russia (Andreev/Davydenko)	W
2008	1st round	Austria (Knowle/Melzer)	W
2008	Quarterfinal	France (Clément/Llodra)	L
2009	1st round	Switzerland (Allegro/Wawrinka)	W
2009	Quarterfinal	Croatia (Karanusic/Zovko)	W
2010	1st round (w/ John Isner)	Serbia (Tipsarević/Zimonjić)	W
2011	1st round	Chile (Aguilar/Massú)	W
2011	Semifinal	Spain (Granollers/Verdasco)	W
2012	Quarterfinal	France (Benneteau/Llodra)	W
2012	Semifinal	Spain (Granollers/López)	W
2013	1st round	Brazil (Melo/Soares)	L
2013	Quarterfinal	Serbia (Bozoljac/Zimonjić)	L
2014	1st round	(United Kingdom) Great Britain (Fleming/Inglot)	W
2014	Play-off	Slovakia (Gombos/Lacko)	W
2015	1st round	(United Kingdom) Great Britain (Inglot/Murray)	W
2016	1st round	Australia (Hewitt/Peers)	W
2016	Quarterfinal	Croatia (Čilić/Dodig)	L
2020	Qualifying round	Uzbekistan (Fayziev/Istomin)	W

== Grand Slam tournaments ==
=== Doubles: 30 (16–14) ===
By winning the 2006 Wimbledon title, Bryan completed the men's doubles Career Grand Slam. He became the 19th individual player and, with Mike Bryan, the 7th doubles pair to achieve this.

Result	Year	Championship	Surface	Partner	Opponents	Score
Win	2003	French Open	Clay	(United States) Mike Bryan	(Netherlands) Paul Haarhuis (Russia) Yevgeny Kafelnikov	7–6^{(7–3)}, 6–3
Loss	2003	US Open	Hard	(United States) Mike Bryan	(Sweden) Jonas Björkman (Australia) Todd Woodbridge	7–5, 0–6, 5–7
Loss	2004	Australian Open	Hard	(United States) Mike Bryan	(France) Michaël Llodra (France) Fabrice Santoro	6–7^{(4–7)}, 3–6
Loss	2005	Australian Open (2)	Hard	(United States) Mike Bryan	(Zimbabwe) Wayne Black (Zimbabwe) Kevin Ullyett	4–6, 4–6
Loss	2005	French Open	Clay	(United States) Mike Bryan	(Sweden) Jonas Björkman (Belarus) Max Mirnyi	6–2, 1–6, 4–6
Loss	2005	Wimbledon	Grass	(United States) Mike Bryan	(Australia) Stephen Huss (South Africa) Wesley Moodie	6–7^{(4–7)}, 3–6, 7–6^{(7–2)}, 3–6
Win	2005	US Open	Hard	(United States) Mike Bryan	(Sweden) Jonas Björkman (Belarus) Max Mirnyi	6–1, 6–4
Win	2006	Australian Open	Hard	(United States) Mike Bryan	(Czech Republic) Martin Damm (India) Leander Paes	4–6, 6–3, 6–4
Loss	2006	French Open (2)	Clay	(United States) Mike Bryan	(Sweden) Jonas Björkman (Belarus) Max Mirnyi	7–6^{(7–5)}, 4–6, 5–7
Win	2006	Wimbledon	Grass	(United States) Mike Bryan	(France) Fabrice Santoro (Serbia) Nenad Zimonjić	6–4, 4–6, 6–4, 6–2
Win	2007	Australian Open (2)	Hard	(United States) Mike Bryan	(Sweden) Jonas Björkman (Belarus) Max Mirnyi	7–5, 7–5
Loss	2007	Wimbledon (2)	Grass	(United States) Mike Bryan	(France) Arnaud Clément (France) Michaël Llodra	7–6^{(7–5)}, 3–6, 4–6, 4–6
Win	2008	US Open (2)	Hard	(United States) Mike Bryan	(Czech Republic) Lukáš Dlouhý (India) Leander Paes	7–6^{(7–5)}, 7–6^{(12–10)}
Win	2009	Australian Open (3)	Hard	(United States) Mike Bryan	(India) Mahesh Bhupathi (The Bahamas) Mark Knowles	2–6, 7–5, 6–0
Loss	2009	Wimbledon (3)	Grass	(United States) Mike Bryan	(Canada) Daniel Nestor (Serbia) Nenad Zimonjić	6–7^{(7–9)}, 7–6^{(7–3)}, 6–7^{(5–7)}, 3–6
Win	2010	Australian Open (4)	Hard	(United States) Mike Bryan	(Canada) Daniel Nestor (Serbia) Nenad Zimonjić	6–3, 6–7^{(5–7)}, 6–3
Win	2010	US Open (3)	Hard	(United States) Mike Bryan	(India) Rohan Bopanna (Pakistan) Aisam-ul-Haq Qureshi	7–6^{(7–5)}, 7–6^{(7–4)}
Win	2011	Australian Open (5)	Hard	(United States) Mike Bryan	(India) Mahesh Bhupathi (India) Leander Paes	6–3, 6–4
Win	2011	Wimbledon (2)	Grass	(United States) Mike Bryan	(Sweden) Robert Lindstedt (Romania) Horia Tecău	6–3, 6–4, 7–6^{(7–2)}
Loss	2012	Australian Open (3)	Hard	(United States) Mike Bryan	(India) Leander Paes (Czech Republic) Radek Štěpánek	6–7^{(1–7)}, 2–6
Loss	2012	French Open (3)	Clay	(United States) Mike Bryan	(Belarus) Max Mirnyi (Canada) Daniel Nestor	4–6, 4–6
Win	2012	US Open (4)	Hard	(United States) Mike Bryan	(India) Leander Paes (Czech Republic) Radek Štěpánek	6–3, 6–4
Win	2013	Australian Open (6)	Hard	(United States) Mike Bryan	(Netherlands) Robin Haase (Netherlands) Igor Sijsling	6–3, 6–4
Win	2013	French Open (2)	Clay	(United States) Mike Bryan	(France) Michaël Llodra (France) Nicolas Mahut	6–4, 4–6, 7–6^{(7–4)}
Win	2013	Wimbledon (3)	Grass	(United States) Mike Bryan	(Croatia) Ivan Dodig (Brazil) Marcelo Melo	3–6, 6–3, 6–4, 6–4
Loss	2014	Wimbledon (4)	Grass	(United States) Mike Bryan	(United States) Jack Sock (Canada) Vasek Pospisil	6–7^{(5–7)}, 7–6^{(7–3)}, 4–6, 6–3, 5–7
Win	2014	US Open (5)	Hard	(United States) Mike Bryan	(Spain) Marcel Granollers (Spain) Marc López	6–3, 6–4
Loss	2015	French Open (4)	Clay	(United States) Mike Bryan	(Croatia) Ivan Dodig (Brazil) Marcelo Melo	7–6^{(7–5)}, 6–7^{(5–7)}, 5–7
Loss	2016	French Open (5)	Clay	(United States) Mike Bryan	(Spain) Feliciano López (Spain) Marc López	4–6, 7–6^{(8–6)}, 3–6
Loss	2017	Australian Open (4)	Hard	(United States) Mike Bryan	(Finland) Henri Kontinen (Australia) John Peers	5–7, 5–7

=== Mixed doubles: 9 (7–2) ===
Result	Year	Championship	Surface	Partner	Opponents	Score
Loss	2002	US Open	Hard	(Slovenia) Katarina Srebotnik	(United States) Lisa Raymond (United States) Mike Bryan	6–7^{(9–11)}, 6–7^{(1–7)}
Win	2003	US Open	Hard	(Slovenia) Katarina Srebotnik	(Russia) Lina Krasnoroutskaya (Canada) Daniel Nestor	5–7, 7–5, [10–5]
Win	2004	US Open (2)	Hard	(Russia) Vera Zvonareva	(Australia) Alicia Molik (Australia) Todd Woodbridge	6–3, 6–4
Loss	2006	Wimbledon	Grass	(United States) Venus Williams	(Russia) Vera Zvonareva (Israel) Andy Ram	3–6, 2–6
Win	2006	US Open (3)	Hard	(United States) Martina Navratilova	(Czech Republic) Květa Peschke (Czech Republic) Martin Damm	6–2, 6–3
Win	2008	French Open	Clay	(Belarus) Victoria Azarenka	(Slovenia) Katarina Srebotnik (Serbia) Nenad Zimonjić	6–2, 7–6^{(7–4)}
Win	2008	Wimbledon	Grass	(Australia) Samantha Stosur	(Slovenia) Katarina Srebotnik (United States) Mike Bryan	7–5, 6–4
Win	2009	French Open (2)	Clay	(United States) Liezel Huber	(United States) Vania King (Brazil) Marcelo Melo	5–7, 7–6^{(7–5)}, [10–7]
Win	2010	US Open (4)	Hard	(United States) Liezel Huber	(Czech Republic) Květa Peschke (Pakistan) Aisam-ul-Haq Qureshi	6–4, 6–4

== Performance timelines ==
Key
W	F	SF	QF	#R	RR	Q#	DNQ	A	NH

(W) winner; (F) finalist; (SF) semifinalist; (QF) quarterfinalist; (#R) rounds 4, 3, 2, 1; (RR) round-robin stage; (Q#) qualification round; (DNQ) did not qualify; (A) absent; (NH) not held; (SR) strike rate (events won / competed); (W–L) win–loss record.

=== Doubles ===
Tournament	1995	1996	1997	1998	1999	2000	2001	2002	2003	2004	2005	2006	2007	2008	2009	2010	2011	2012	2013	2014	2015	2016	2017	2018	2019	2020	SR	W–L	Win%
Australian Open	A	A	A	A	A	1R	1R	QF	3R	F	F	W	W	QF	W	W	W	F	W	3R	3R	3R	F	SF	QF	3R	6 / 21	77–15	84%
French Open	A	A	A	A	2R	2R	2R	QF	W	SF	F	F	QF	QF	SF	2R	SF	F	W	QF	F	F	2R	A	3R	A	2 / 20	68–18	79%
Wimbledon	A	A	A	A	3R	1R	SF	SF	QF	3R	F	W	F	SF	F	QF	W	SF	W	F	QF	QF	2R	A	3R	NH	3 / 20	72–17	81%
US Open	1R	1R	1R	1R	1R	QF	2R	SF	F	3R	W	3R	QF	W	SF	W	1R	W	SF	W	1R	QF	SF	A	3R	A	5 / 24	67–19	78%
Win–loss	0–1	0–1	0–1	0–1	3–3	4–4	6–4	14–4	14–3	13–4	21–3	18–2	17–3	16–3	19–3	16–2	16–2	20–3	22–1	16–3	10–4	13–4	11–4	4–1	9–4	2–1	16 / 85	284–69	80.45%
Year-end championship
ATP Finals	Did not qualify (DNQ)						RR	A	W	W	SF	RR	A	F	W	SF	SF	RR	F	W	SF	SF	RR	DNQ	A	DNQ	4 / 15	36–23	61%

=== Mixed doubles ===
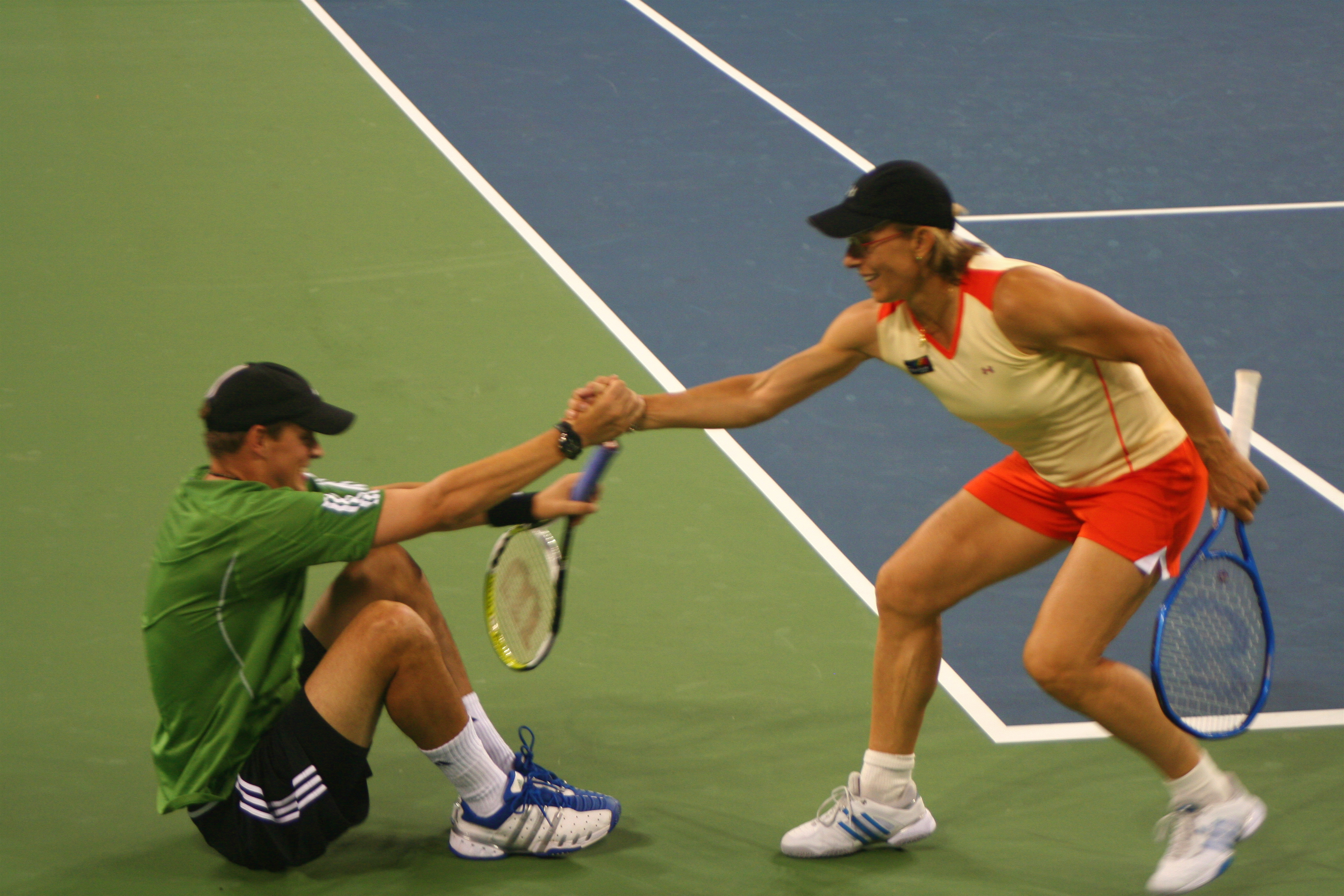
Martina Navratilova gives Bryan a hand. The pair won the 2006 Mixed Doubles title at the US Open.

Tournament	1999	2000	2001	2002	2003	2004	2005	2006	2007	2008	2009	2010	2011	2012	2013	2014	2015	2016	2017	2018	2019	2020	SR	W–L	Win %
Australian Open	A	A	A	QF	1R	1R	QF	QF	QF	A	A	2R	2R	A	QF	A	A	QF	A	A	A	A	0 / 10	14–10	58%
French Open	2R	QF	A	SF	QF	QF	A	SF	QF	W	W	A	A	1R	A	A	1R	QF	A	A	A	A	2 / 12	27–10	73%
Wimbledon	QF	1R	QF	QF	2R	SF	2R	F	3R	W	QF	2R	QF	SF	A	3R	2R	A	A	A	A	NH	1 / 16	37–15	71%
US Open	A	A	1R	F	W	W	QF	W	2R	A	A	W	2R	2R	A	A	A	A	A	A	A	A	4 / 10	29–6	83%
Win–loss	4–2	3–2	3–2	12–4	8–3	10–3	4–3	14–3	6–4	11–0	7–1	7–2	5–3	4–3	2–1	2–1	0–2	4–2	0–0	0–0	0–0	0–0	7 / 48	106–41	57%

== Grand Slam seedings ==
The tournaments won by Bryan are in boldface, and advances into finals by Bryan are in italics.

=== Men's doubles ===
Legend (slams won / times seeded) seeded No. 1 (**11** / 36) seeded No. 2 (**4** / 15) seeded No. 3 (**1** / 7) seeded No. 4–10 (0 / 13) Seeded outside the top 10 (0 / 2) not seeded (0 / 13)	Longest / total: 5 / 85; 3 / 85; 3 / 85; 5 / 85; 1 / 85; 9 / 85

Year	Australian Open	French Open	Wimbledon	US Open
1995	did not play	did not play	did not play	not seeded
1996	did not play	did not play	did not play	not seeded
1997	did not play	did not play	did not play	wild card
1998	did not play	did not play	did not play	wild card
1999	did not play	not seeded	not seeded	not seeded
2000	not seeded	not seeded	not seeded	not seeded
2001	not seeded	not seeded	15th	8th
2002	10th	5th	6th	6th
2003	2nd	**3rd (1)**	3rd	2nd (1)
2004	1st (2)	1st	2nd	2nd
2005	2nd (3)	3rd (4)	2nd (5)	**2nd (2)**
2006	**1st (3)**	1st (6)	**1st (4)**	1st
2007	**1st (5)**	1st	1st (7)	1st
2008	1st	1st	1st	**2nd (6)**
2009	**2nd (7)**	2nd	1st (8)	1st
2010	**1st (8)**	1st	2nd	**1st (9)**
2011	**1st (10)**	1st	**1st (11)**	1st
2012	1st (9)	2nd (10)	2nd	**2nd (12)**
2013	**1st (13)**	**1st (14)**	**1st (15)**	1st
2014	1st	1st	1st (11)	**1st (16)**
2015	1st	1st (12)	1st	1st
2016	3rd	5th (13)	2nd	3rd
2017	3rd	3rd (14)	5th	5th
2018	6th	did not play	did not play	did not play
2019	4th	7th	7th	7th
2020	13th	retired		

Awards
Preceded by (The Bahamas) Mark Knowles & (Canada) Daniel Nestor (Serbia) Nenad Zimonjić & (Canada) Daniel Nestor	ITF Men's doubles World Champion (with (United States) Mike Bryan); 2003–07; 2009–14	Succeeded by (Serbia) Nenad Zimonjić & (Canada) Daniel Nestor (Netherlands) Jean-Julien Rojer & (Romania) Horia Tecău
Preceded by (The Bahamas) Mark Knowles & (Canada) Daniel Nestor (The Bahamas) Mark Knowles & (Canada) Daniel Nestor (Serbia) Nenad Zimonjić & (Canada) Daniel Nestor	ATP Doubles Team of the Year (with (United States) Mike Bryan); 2003; 2005–07; 2009–14	Succeeded by (The Bahamas) Mark Knowles & (Canada) Daniel Nestor (Serbia) Nenad Zimonjić & (Canada) Daniel Nestor (Netherlands) Jean-Julien Rojer & (Romania) Horia Tecău
Preceded by None	ATP Fans' Favorite Team (with (United States) Mike Bryan); 2006–17	Succeeded by (United States) Mike Bryan & (United States) Jack Sock
Preceded by (United Kingdom) Andy Murray	Arthur Ashe Humanitarian of the Year (with (United States) Mike Bryan); 2015	Succeeded by (Croatia) Marin Čilić
Records
Preceded by (United States) John McEnroe	Most Weeks at World No. 1 (Doubles) (with (United States) Mike Bryan); December 12, 2011 – November 5, 2012	Succeeded by (United States) Mike Bryan
