= 2004 Tennis Masters Cup – Doubles =

Doubles
- 2004 Tennis Masters Cup

Final
- Champions: (United States) Bob Bryan (United States) Mike Bryan
- Runners-up: (Zimbabwe) Wayne Black (Zimbabwe) Kevin Ullyett
- Score: 4–6, 7–5, 6–4, 6–2

Details
- Draw: 8

Events
Singles	Doubles
- Tennis Masters Cup

Defending champions Bob Bryan and Mike Bryan successfully defended their title, defeating Wayne Black and Kevin Ullyett in the final, 4–6, 7–5, 6–4, 6–2 to win the doubles tennis title at the 2004 Tennis Masters Cup.

This was the last edition of the tournament to have a final played as best-of-five-sets.

== Seeds ==
1. (The Bahamas) Mark Knowles / (Canada) Daniel Nestor (semifinals)
2. (United States) Bob Bryan / (United States) Mike Bryan (champions)
3. (Sweden) Jonas Björkman / (Australia) Todd Woodbridge (semifinals)
4. (Zimbabwe) Wayne Black / (Zimbabwe) Kevin Ullyett (final)
5. (India) Mahesh Bhupathi / (Belarus) Max Mirnyi (round robin)
6. (Czech Republic) Martin Damm / (Czech Republic) Cyril Suk (round robin)
7. (Argentina) Gastón Etlis / (Argentina) Martín Rodríguez (round robin)
8. (Belgium) Xavier Malisse / (Belgium) Olivier Rochus (round robin)

== Draw ==
Key

- Q = Qualifier
- WC = Wild card
- LL = Lucky loser
- Alt = Alternate
- ITF = ITF entry
- PR = Protected ranking
- SR = Special ranking
- SE = Special exempt
- JE = Junior exempt
- JR = Junior Accelerator Programme entrant
- CO = College Accelerator Programme entrant
- NG = Next Gen Accelerator Program entrant
- w/o = Walkover
- r = Retired
- d = Defaulted

=== Finals ===
Semifinals
1	(The Bahamas) Mark Knowles (Canada) Daniel Nestor	2	4
2	(United States) Bob Bryan (United States) Mike Bryan	6	6
3	(Sweden) Jonas Björkman (Australia) Todd Woodbridge	4	2
4	(Zimbabwe) Wayne Black (Zimbabwe) Kevin Ullyett	6	6

Final
2	(United States) Bob Bryan (United States) Mike Bryan	4	7	6	6
4	(Zimbabwe) Wayne Black (Zimbabwe) Kevin Ullyett	6	5	4	2

=== Red group ===
		(The Bahamas) Knowles (Canada) Nestor	(Zimbabwe) Black (Zimbabwe) Ullyett	(Czech Republic) Damm (Czech Republic) Suk	(Belgium) Malisse (Belgium) Rochus	RR; W–L	Set; W–L	Game; W–L	Standings
1	(The Bahamas) Mark Knowles (Canada) Daniel Nestor		4–6, 6–3, 7–6^{(9–7)}	6–2, 6–3	5–7, 7–6^{(7–2)}, 6–4	3–0	6–2	47–37	1
4	(Zimbabwe) Wayne Black (Zimbabwe) Kevin Ullyett	6–4, 3–6, 6–7^{(7–9)}		6–2, 6–2	6–4, 6–2	2–1	5–2	39–27	2
6	(Czech Republic) Martin Damm (Czech Republic) Cyril Suk	2–6, 3–6	2–6, 2–6		6–2, 1–6, 4–6	0–3	1–6	20–38	4
8	(Belgium) Xavier Malisse (Belgium) Olivier Rochus	7–5, 6–7^{(2–7)}, 4–6	4–6, 2–6	2–6, 6–1, 6–4		1–2	3–5	37–41	3

Standings are determined by: 1. number of wins; 2. number of matches; 3. in two-players-ties, head-to-head records; 4. in three-players-ties, percentage of sets won, or of games won; 5. steering-committee decision.

=== Blue group ===
		(United States) Bryan (United States) Bryan	(Sweden) Björkman (Australia) Woodbridge	(India) Bhupathi (Belarus) Mirnyi	(Argentina) Etlis (Argentina) Rodríguez	RR; W–L	Set; W–L	Game; W–L	Standings
2	(United States) Bob Bryan (United States) Mike Bryan		3–6, 4–6	7–6^{(9–7)}, 5–7, 6–4	6–3, 7–6^{(7–4)}	2–1	4–3	38–38	2
3	(Sweden) Jonas Björkman (Australia) Todd Woodbridge	6–3, 6–4		6–3, 6–2	2–6, 7–6^{(7–4)}, 7–6^{(7–3)}	3–0	6–1	40–30	1
5	(India) Mahesh Bhupathi (Belarus) Max Mirnyi	6–7^{(7–9)}, 7–5, 4–6	3–6, 2–6		6–3, 7–6^{(7–5)}	1–2	3–4	35–39	3
7	(Argentina) Gastón Etlis (Argentina) Martín Rodríguez	3–6, 6–7^{(4–7)}	6–2, 6–7^{(4–7)}, 6–7^{(3–7)}	3–6, 6–7^{(5–7)}		0–3	1–6	36–42	4

Standings are determined by: 1. number of wins; 2. number of matches; 3. in two-players-ties, head-to-head records; 4. in three-players-ties, percentage of sets won, or of games won; 5. steering-committee decision.
