= 2014 ATP World Tour Finals – Doubles =

Doubles
- 2014 ATP World Tour Finals

Final
- Champion: (United States) Bob Bryan (United States) Mike Bryan
- Runner-up: (Croatia) Ivan Dodig (Brazil) Marcelo Melo
- Score: 6–7^{(5–7)}, 6–2, [10–7]

Events
Singles	Doubles
← 2013 ·	ATP World Tour Finals	· 2015 →

Bob and Mike Bryan defeating Ivan Dodig and Marcelo Melo in the final, 6–7^{(5–7)}, 6–2, [10–7] to win the doubles tennis title at the 2014 ATP World Tour Finals. It was their fourth Tour Finals title.

David Marrero and Fernando Verdasco were the reigning champions, but did not qualify this year.

== Seeds ==
1. (United States) Bob Bryan / (United States) Mike Bryan (champions)
2. (Canada) Daniel Nestor / (Serbia) Nenad Zimonjić (round robin)
3. (Austria) Alexander Peya / (Brazil) Bruno Soares (round robin)
4. (France) Julien Benneteau / (France) Édouard Roger-Vasselin (semifinals)
5. (Netherlands) Jean-Julien Rojer / (Romania) Horia Tecău (round robin)
6. (Spain) Marcel Granollers / (Spain) Marc López (round robin)
7. (Croatia) Ivan Dodig / (Brazil) Marcelo Melo (final)
8. (Poland) Łukasz Kubot / (Sweden) Robert Lindstedt (semifinals)

== Alternates ==
1. (Canada) Vasek Pospisil / (United States) Jack Sock (Did not play)
2. (United States) Eric Butorac / (South Africa) Raven Klaasen (Did not play)

== Draw ==
=== Key ===
- Q = Qualifier
- WC = Wild card
- LL = Lucky loser
- Alt = Alternate
- SE = Special exempt
- PR = Protected ranking
- ITF = ITF entry
- JE = Junior exempt
- w/o = Walkover
- r = Retired
- d = Defaulted
- SR = Special ranking

=== Finals ===
Semifinals
8	(Poland) Łukasz Kubot (Sweden) Robert Lindstedt	6	4	[6]
7	(Croatia) Ivan Dodig (Brazil) Marcelo Melo	4	6	[10]
4	(France) Julien Benneteau (France) Édouard Roger-Vasselin	0	3
1	(United States) Bob Bryan (United States) Mike Bryan	6	6

Final
7	(Croatia) Ivan Dodig (Brazil) Marcelo Melo	7^{7}	2	[7]
1	(United States) Bob Bryan (United States) Mike Bryan	6^{5}	6	[10]

=== Group A ===
		(United States) Bryan (United States) Bryan	(Austria) Peya (Brazil) Soares	(Netherlands) Rojer (Romania) Tecău	(Poland) Kubot (Sweden) Lindstedt	RR W–L	Set W–L	Game W–L	Standings
1	(United States) Bob Bryan (United States) Mike Bryan		7–6^{(7–3)}, 7–6^{(7–2)}	6–7^{(4–7)}, 6–3, [10–6]	6–7^{(3–7)}, 3–6	2–1	4–3 (57.1%)	36–35 (50.7%)	2
3	(Austria) Alexander Peya (Brazil) Bruno Soares	6–7^{(3–7)}, 6–7^{(2–7)}		6–3, 3–6, [12–10]	4–6, 6–3, [6–10]	1–2	3–5 (37.5%)	32–33 (49.2%)	3
5	(Netherlands) Jean-Julien Rojer (Romania) Horia Tecău	7–6^{(7–4)}, 3–6, [6–10]	3–6, 6–3, [10–12]		4−6, 6−7^{(4−7)}	0–3	2–6 (25.0%)	29–36 (44.6%)	4
8	(Poland) Łukasz Kubot (Sweden) Robert Lindstedt	7–6^{(7–3)}, 6–3	6–4, 3–6, [10–6]	6−4, 7−6^{(7−4)}		3–0	6–1 (85.7%)	36–29 (55.4%)	1

=== Group B ===
		(Canada) Nestor (Serbia) Zimonjić	(France) Benneteau (France) Roger-Vasselin	(Spain) Granollers (Spain) López	(Croatia) Dodig (Brazil) Melo	RR W–L	Set W–L	Game W–L	Standings
2	(Canada) Daniel Nestor (Serbia) Nenad Zimonjić		4–6, 7–5, [4–10]	6–7^{(5–7)}, 6–3, [11–9]	3–6, 5–7	1–2	3–5 (37.5%)	32–35 (47.8%)	3
4	(France) Julien Benneteau (France) Édouard Roger-Vasselin	6–4, 5–7, [10–4]		4–6, 4–6	4–6, 6–2, [10–8]	2–1	4–4 (50.0%)	31–31 (50.0%)	1
6	(Spain) Marcel Granollers (Spain) Marc López	7–6^{(7–5)}, 3–6, [9–11]	6–4, 6–4		6–7^{(5–7)}, 6–7^{(12–14)}	1–2	3–4 (42.9%)	34–35 (49.3%)	4
7	(Croatia) Ivan Dodig (Brazil) Marcelo Melo	6–3, 7–5	6–4, 2–6, [8–10]	7–6^{(7–5)}, 7–6^{(14–12)}		2–1	5–2 (71.4%)	35–31 (53.0%)	2

Standings are determined by: 1. number of wins; 2. number of matches; 3. in two-player ties, head-to-head records; 4. in three-player ties, percentage of sets won, or of games won; 5. steering-committee decision.
