= 2015 Monte-Carlo Rolex Masters – Doubles =

Doubles
- 2015 Monte-Carlo Rolex Masters

Final
- Champions: (United States) Bob Bryan (United States) Mike Bryan
- Runners-up: (Italy) Simone Bolelli (Italy) Fabio Fognini
- Score: 7–6^{(7–3)}, 6–1

Events
Singles	Doubles
← 2014 ·	Monte-Carlo Rolex Masters	· 2016 →

Bob and Mike Bryan successfully defended their title by defeating Simone Bolelli and Fabio Fognini in the final, 7–6^{(7–3)}, 6–1.

== Seeds ==
All seeds receive a bye into the second round.

1. (United States) Bob Bryan / (United States) Mike Bryan (champions)
2. (Croatia) Ivan Dodig / (Brazil) Marcelo Melo (semifinals)
3. (Netherlands) Jean-Julien Rojer / (Romania) Horia Tecău (second round)
4. (Poland) Marcin Matkowski / (Serbia) Nenad Zimonjić (semifinals)
5. (Spain) Marcel Granollers / (Spain) Marc López (quarterfinals)
6. (Canada) Daniel Nestor / (India) Leander Paes (second round)
7. (Austria) Alexander Peya / (Brazil) Bruno Soares (quarterfinals)
8. (France) Nicolas Mahut / (France) Édouard Roger-Vasselin (quarterfinals)

== Draw ==
=== Key ===
- Q = Qualifier
- WC = Wild card
- LL = Lucky loser
- Alt = Alternate
- ITF = ITF entry
- PR = Protected ranking
- SR = Special ranking
- SE = Special exempt
- JE = Junior exempt
- JR = Junior Accelerator Programme entrant
- CO = College Accelerator Programme entrant
- NG = Next Gen Accelerator Program entrant
- w/o = Walkover
- r = Retired
- d = Defaulted

=== Finals ===
Semifinals
1	(United States) Bob Bryan (United States) Mike Bryan	6	6
4	(Poland) Marcin Matkowski (Serbia) Nenad Zimonjić	4	2
(Italy) Simone Bolelli (Italy) Fabio Fognini	7^{8}	6
2	(Croatia) Ivan Dodig (Brazil) Marcelo Melo	6^{6}	3

Final
1	(United States) Bob Bryan (United States) Mike Bryan	7^{7}	6
(Italy) Simone Bolelli (Italy) Fabio Fognini	6^{3}	1

=== Top half ===
First round
(Croatia) M Draganja (Finland) H Kontinen	1	3
(Bulgaria) G Dimitrov (Belarus) M Mirnyi	6	6
Alt	(Netherlands) R Haase (South Africa) R Klaasen	6	6
(France) A Mannarino (Czech Republic) L Rosol	1	2
(Spain) T Robredo (Spain) F Verdasco	1
Alt	(Italy) A Seppi (Ukraine) S Stakhovsky	2^{r}
(India) R Bopanna (Romania) F Mergea	7^{8}	4	[7]
WC	(France) B Paire (Switzerland) S Wawrinka	6^{6}	6	[10]

Second round
1	(United States) B Bryan (United States) M Bryan	6	6
(Bulgaria) G Dimitrov (Belarus) M Mirnyi	2	2
Alt	(Netherlands) R Haase (South Africa) R Klaasen	1	1
5	(Spain) M Granollers (Spain) M López	6	6
4	(Poland) M Matkowski (Serbia) N Zimonjić	6	7^{7}
(Spain) T Robredo (Spain) F Verdasco	3	6^{3}
WC	(France) B Paire (Switzerland) S Wawrinka	6	7^{7}
6	(Canada) D Nestor (India) L Paes	4	6^{4}

Quarterfinals
1	(United States) B Bryan (United States) M Bryan	6	2	[10]
5	(Spain) M Granollers (Spain) M López	4	6	[4]
4	(Poland) M Matkowski (Serbia) N Zimonjić	6	6
WC	(France) B Paire (Switzerland) S Wawrinka	2	3

Semifinals
1	(United States) B Bryan (United States) M Bryan	6	6
4	(Poland) M Matkowski (Serbia) N Zimonjić	4	2

=== Bottom half ===
First round
(United Kingdom) J Murray (Australia) J Peers	6	6^{4}	[6]
(France) G Monfils (France) J-W Tsonga	4	7^{7}	[10]
(Colombia) JS Cabal (Colombia) R Farah	3	4
(Italy) S Bolelli (Italy) F Fognini	6	6
PR	(Germany) P Kohlschreiber (Germany) F Mayer	7^{9}	6
(Australia) B Tomic (Serbia) V Troicki	6^{7}	0
(France) J Chardy (Croatia) M Čilić	6^{2}	7	[6]
WC	(Monaco) R Arneodo (Monaco) B Balleret	7^{7}	5	[10]

Second round
8	(France) N Mahut (France) É Roger-Vasselin	6	6
(France) G Monfils (France) J-W Tsonga	4	4
(Italy) S Bolelli (Italy) F Fognini	3	7	[13]
3	(Netherlands) J-J Rojer (Romania) H Tecău	6	5	[11]
7	(Austria) A Peya (Brazil) B Soares	6	5	[10]
PR	(Germany) P Kohlschreiber (Germany) F Mayer	4	7	[6]
WC	(Monaco) R Arneodo (Monaco) B Balleret	6^{2}	2
2	(Croatia) I Dodig (Brazil) M Melo	7^{7}	6

Quarterfinals
8	(France) N Mahut (France) É Roger-Vasselin	6^{4}	2
(Italy) S Bolelli (Italy) F Fognini	7^{7}	6
7	(Austria) A Peya (Brazil) B Soares	3	4
2	(Croatia) I Dodig (Brazil) M Melo	6	6

Semifinals
(Italy) S Bolelli (Italy) F Fognini	7^{8}	6
2	(Croatia) I Dodig (Brazil) M Melo	6^{6}	3
