= Ivan Dodig =

Croatian tennis player (born 1985)

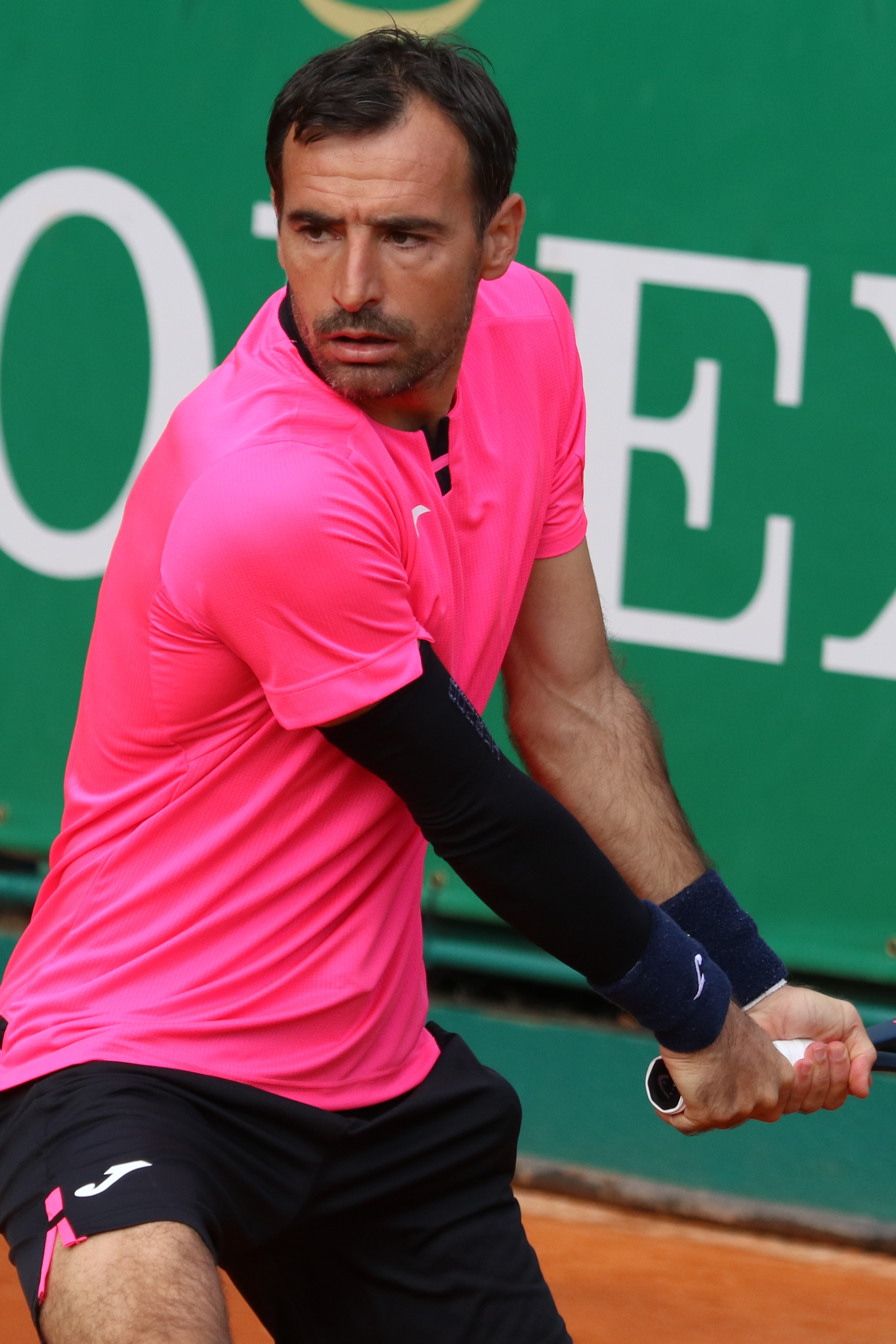
- Dodig at the 2023 Monte-Carlo Masters
- Country (sports): Bosnia and Herzegovina (2004–2008); Croatia (2008–)
- Residence: Freeport, Bahamas
- Born: 2 January 1985 (age 41) Međugorje, SR Bosnia and Herzegovina, SFR Yugoslavia
- Height: 1.83 m (6 ft 0 in)
- Turned pro: 2004
- Retired: 5 September 2025
- Plays: Right-handed (two-handed backhand)
- Coach: Mladen Dodig
- Prize money: $10,533,904
- Official website: ivandodig.com

Singles
- Career record: 118–140
- Career titles: 1
- Highest ranking: No. 29 (7 October 2013)

Grand Slam singles results
- Australian Open: 3R (2013)
- French Open: 2R (2016)
- Wimbledon: 4R (2013)
- US Open: 3R (2013)

Doubles
- Career record: 475–325
- Career titles: 24
- Highest ranking: No. 2 (11 September 2023)

Grand Slam doubles results
- Australian Open: W (2021)
- French Open: W (2015, 2023)
- Wimbledon: F (2013)
- US Open: SF (2013, 2014, 2023)

Other doubles tournaments
- Tour Finals: F (2014)
- Olympic Games: F (2021)

Mixed doubles
- Career record: 46–19
- Career titles: 4

Grand Slam mixed doubles results
- Australian Open: W (2022)
- French Open: W (2018, 2019)
- Wimbledon: W (2019)
- US Open: SF (2019)

Other mixed doubles tournaments
- Olympic Games: 1R (2021)

Team competitions
- Davis Cup: W (2018)
Medal record
Representing Croatia
Olympic Games
Silver medal – second place	2020 Tokyo	Men's Doubles
- Last updated on: 20 November 2025.

Ivan Dodig (Croatian pronunciation: [ǐʋan dǒdiɡ]; born 2 January 1985) is a Croatian former professional tennis player who specialized in doubles. He reached his career-high doubles ranking of World No. 2 in September 2023. He is a seven-time Grand Slam champion, having won men's doubles titles at the 2015 French Open with Marcelo Melo, the 2021 Australian Open with Filip Polášek and the 2023 French Open with Austin Krajicek.

In mixed doubles, Dodig won the 2018 and 2019 French Opens and 2019 Wimbledon Championships, all alongside Latisha Chan, and the 2022 Australian Open partnering Kristina Mladenovic. He also finished runner-up at the 2013 Wimbledon Championships in men's doubles, and the 2016 French Open and 2017 Australian Open in mixed. Dodig has won 24 doubles titles on the ATP Tour, including six at the Masters 1000 level, and also finished runner-up at the 2014 ATP World Tour Finals.

In singles, Dodig achieved his highest ranking of world No. 29 in October 2013, and won his first ATP title at the 2011 Zagreb Indoors. His best Grand Slam singles result was at the 2013 Wimbledon Championships, where he reached the fourth round. Dodig has represented Croatia in the Davis Cup since 2010, and was part of the team which won the tournament in 2018. He also won a silver medal in men's doubles at the 2020 Summer Olympics alongside Marin Čilić.

== Career ==
=== 2010–2011 ===
At the 2010 Australian Open, he qualified for the main draw and beat former world No. 1, Juan Carlos Ferrero, in the first round in five sets. However, he bowed out to Stefan Koubek in the second round.

Dodig then spent most of the rest of the year competing on the Challenger tour. He failed to qualify for the 2010 French Open, but reached the second round at Wimbledon, beating Óscar Hernández before losing to Sam Querrey in four sets. He also reached the second round at the 2010 US Open, after beating Fernando González, who retired with a knee injury, but Dodig himself retired with an injury against Thiemo de Bakker.

At the 2011 Australian Open, Dodig played Ivo Karlović in the first round and prevailed in a tough five set match. He was then drawn to play third seed and eventual champion Novak Djokovic in the second round. Although he lost in four sets, he was the only player to win a set against Djokovic in the whole tournament.

He followed this up with a surprise first tournament win in front of his home crowd at the 2011 PBZ Zagreb Indoors, beating the previous year's finalist Michael Berrer.

He then made a second-round appearance at the 2011 Regions Morgan Keegan Championships, losing to Juan Martín del Potro, who was making a comeback. Dodig then reached the quarterfinals at the 2011 Delray Beach International Tennis Championships after beating Kunitsyn and Sela, before losing to Janko Tipsarević.

First-round action in the Davis Cup, a showdown between Croatia and Germany, saw Dodig up against Kohlschreiber, but he succumbed to the German in five sets. The loss proved costly, as Germany went on to prevail 3–2 in the tie to move on to the quarterfinals.

At the 2011 Sony Ericsson Open he beat Andrey Golubev in the first round. However, he lost to world No. 4 Robin Söderling despite being up 4–2 in the third set. At the 2011 Monte-Carlo Rolex Masters, he bowed out to World No.29 Tommy Robredo in the first round.

Dodig then found some good form heading into the 2011 Barcelona Open Banco Sabadell tournament. In the opening round he beat Vincent Millot before beating No.3 seed and last year's finalist Robin Söderling. He then went on to claim hard fought scalps over fast-rising Canadian Milos Raonic and home favourite Feliciano López to reach the semifinals of a clay-court tournament for the first time in his career. However, in the semifinals, he was inevitably stopped by five-time champion and eventual champion for the sixth time, world No. 1 Rafael Nadal who is still yet to lose a match on Barcelona soil. Despite breaking twice as he broke once in each set to hang on with Nadal, Dodig eventually fell after giving a decent fight, which added to the Spaniard's current winning streak on clay.

In the second round of the Rogers Cup, Dodig stunned world No. 2 Rafael Nadal, 1–6, 7–6, 7–6 after recovering from a 1–6, 1–3 deficit before losing to Janko Tipsarević in the third round. In August 2011, at the US Open, Dodig lost to Nikolay Davydenko in a closely fought five sets first-round match.

=== 2012: Olympics debut and quarterfinals in doubles ===
At the first Grand Slam event of the year, the 2012 Australian Open he retired against Frederico Gil. At the next two Slams he also lost in the first round to Robin Haase and Lukáš Rosol at the 2012 French Open and Wimbledon respectively. At the 2012 Summer Olympics, he lost to Juan Martín del Potro in the first round in men's singles. He fared better in the men's doubles, where he and partner Marin Čilić reached the quarterfinals. At the 2012 US Open, he defeated qualifier Hiroki Moriya in the first round, however he lost his second-round match against Andy Murray in straight sets.

=== 2013: Career-high ranking in singles in top 30, Wimbledon doubles finalist ===
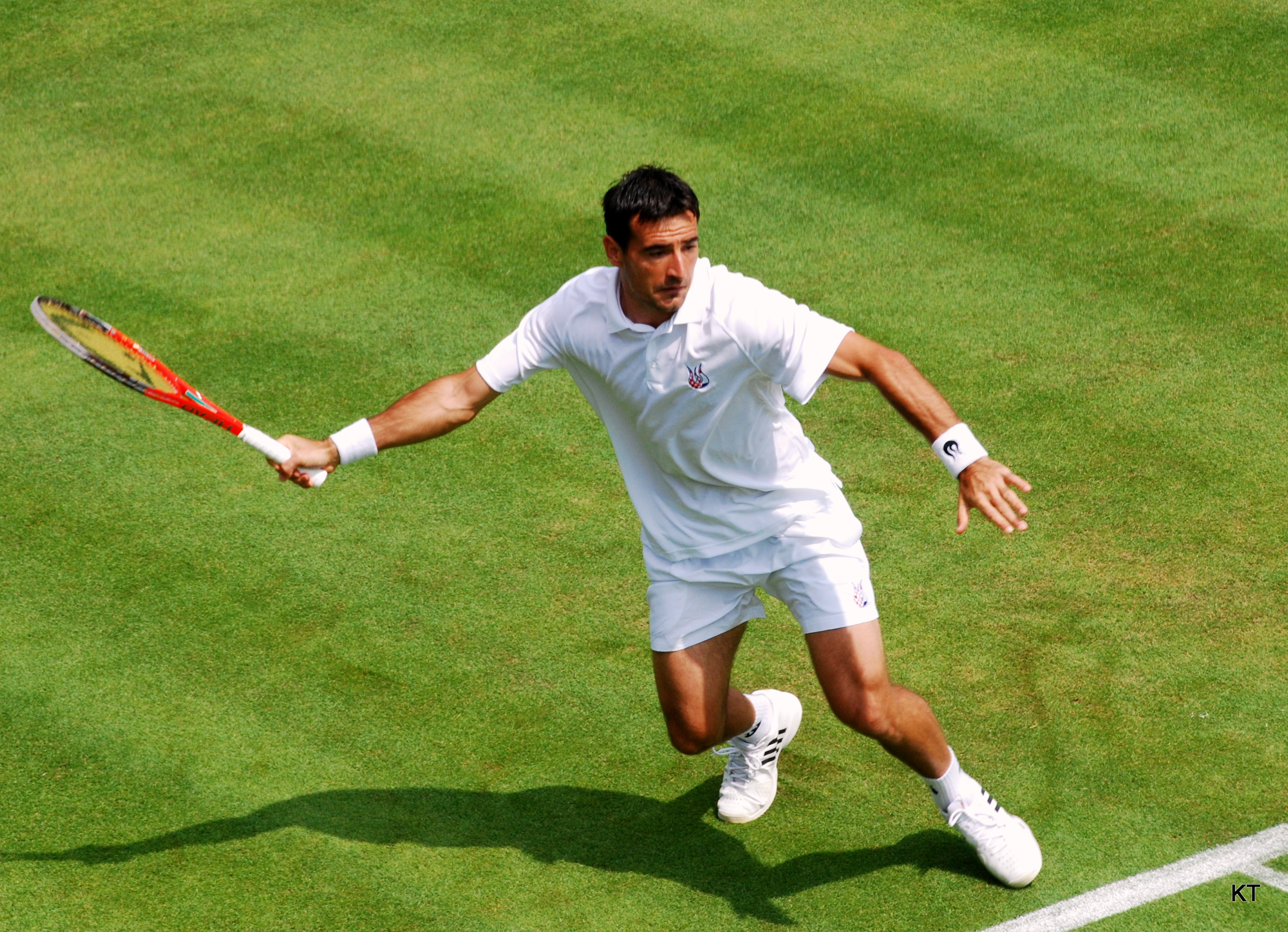
Dodig at the 2013 Wimbledon Championships

Dodig had his most successful season to date, reaching the third round or better at three out of four major tournaments, and breaking into the world's top 30 for the first time. At the Australian Open, Dodig reached the third round of a Grand Slam for the first time, beating Di Wu and Jarkko Nieminen respectively in the first two rounds, before losing to number 10 seed Richard Gasquet. He reached his first quarterfinal of the year at the PBZ Zagreb Indoors, losing to 3rd seed Mikhail Youzhny. At Indian Wells, Dodig defeated 28th seed Julien Benneteau en route to the third round before falling to world No. 2, Roger Federer in straight sets.

During the clay-court season, Dodig reached the semifinals of the BMW Open before falling to eventual champion Tommy Haas. However at the French Open, Dodig lost an extremely tight first round match to Guido Pella, losing 12 games to 10 in the fifth set. He then went on to have his best run at a Grand Slam event to date, due in part to some luck and a brace of injuries, reaching the fourth round at Wimbledon despite only completing one match. Philipp Kohlschreiber retired in the first round in the fifth set. He then beat Denis Kudla in straight sets, followed by Igor Sijsling retiring in the third set. In the fourth round, he led David Ferrer by a set, but eventually lost in four. He and his partner Marcelo Melo also finished as runners-up in the men's doubles to Bob and Mike Bryan.

=== 2014: ATP Tour Finals finalist and two Masters finals in doubles ===
He was the 32nd seed at the 2014 Australian Open where he reached the second round before retiring to Damir Džumhur.

At the 2014 Barcelona Open, Dodig beat world No. 30 Feliciano López in second round and lost to Rafael Nadal in round of 16. At the Rome Masters, he defeated Federico Delbonis and Lukas Rosol, then was beaten in third round by Jérémy Chardy in round of 16.

At the Canada Open, the Croatian took wins over world No. 14 John Isner and Andreas Seppi, after which he was defeated by fifth seeded David Ferrer. At the same tournament, he reached his second Masters final in doubles with Marcelo Melo following their maiden career Masters doubles final at the 2014 Monte-Carlo Masters.

=== 2015–2017: French Open champion, World No. 4, top 5 year-end ranking ===
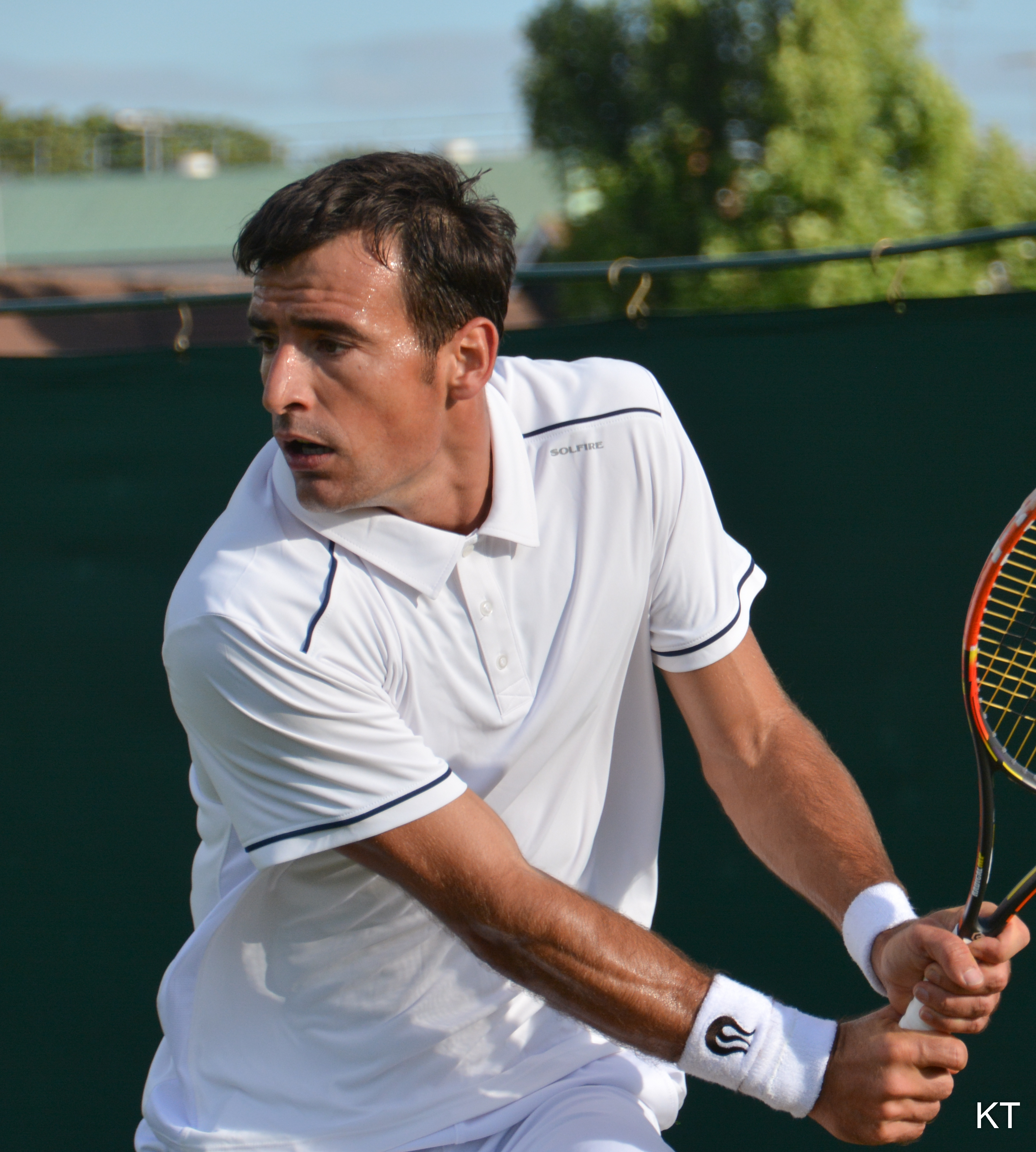
Dodig at the 2015 Wimbledon Championships

Dodig had a strong showing in the men's doubles event at the 2015 Australian Open. Dodig and his partner Marcelo Melo reached the semifinals after falling to Pierre-Hugues Herbert and Nicolas Mahut.

During the clay court season, Dodig and Melo won their first title of the year at the Mexican Open after winning over Mariusz Fyrstenberg and Santiago González 7–6^{(7–2)}, 5–7, 10–3. At the 2015 French Open, Dodig and Melo won their maiden Grand Slam title beating Bob Bryan and Mike Bryan 6–7^{(5–7)}, 7–6^{(7–5)}, 7–5. This win helped Dodig to reach his career high ranking of world No.4 in doubles on 8 June 2015.

Following the grass court season, Dodig and Melo lost in the quarterfinals of the 2015 Wimbledon Championships to qualifiers Jonathan Erlich and Philipp Petzschner 6–4, 2–6, 2–6, 4–6.

Dodig and Melo were knocked out in the third round of the 2016 Wimbledon Championships Doubles, whilst Dodig was knocked out in the first round of the singles. Dodig and Melo won the masters 1000 tournaments at the 2016 Rogers Cup and the 2016 Western & Southern Open. The pair were runners up at the 2016 Nottingham Open as top seeds.

He finished the 2017 season with a top 5 year-end ranking, the best in his career.

=== 2019–2021: New partnerships, Australian Open champion, back to top 10, Olympics silver medalist ===
Dodig won the 2019 Western & Southern Open, the 2019 China Open and the 2021 Australian Open with his new partner Filip Polášek. As a result, he returned to the top 10 on 22 February 2021. They also reached the 2019 Rolex Paris Masters, the 2020 Australian Open and the 2021 Miami Open semifinals.

Partnering with Latisha Chan, he won the mixed doubles titles at the 2019 French Open and followed it up with the 2019 Wimbledon.

At the delayed 2020 Olympics, Dodig partnered Marin Čilić and won a silver medal, losing to fellow Croats and top seeds Nikola Mektić and Mate Pavić in 3 sets 4–6, 6–3, [6–10]. It was the third time in the Olympics men's doubles' history that the same country won both gold and silver, and the first one since 1908.

For the North-American hard court swing, Dodig partnered with Rohan Bopanna with their best showing being the quarterfinals of the 2021 Canadian Open where they were defeated by the eventual champions Salisbury/Ram.

He reached the final at the 2021 Winston-Salem Open with new partner Austin Krajicek.

At the 2021 BNP Paribas Open in Indian Wells, he reached his second Masters 1000 semifinal for 2021 after reuniting with Marcelo Melo where they were defeated by the eventual champions, his former partner Polasek and John Peers. Seeded as a top pair, Dodig and Melo reached the quarterfinals at the 2021 European Open.

=== 2022: Australian Open mixed doubles title, French Open finalist ===
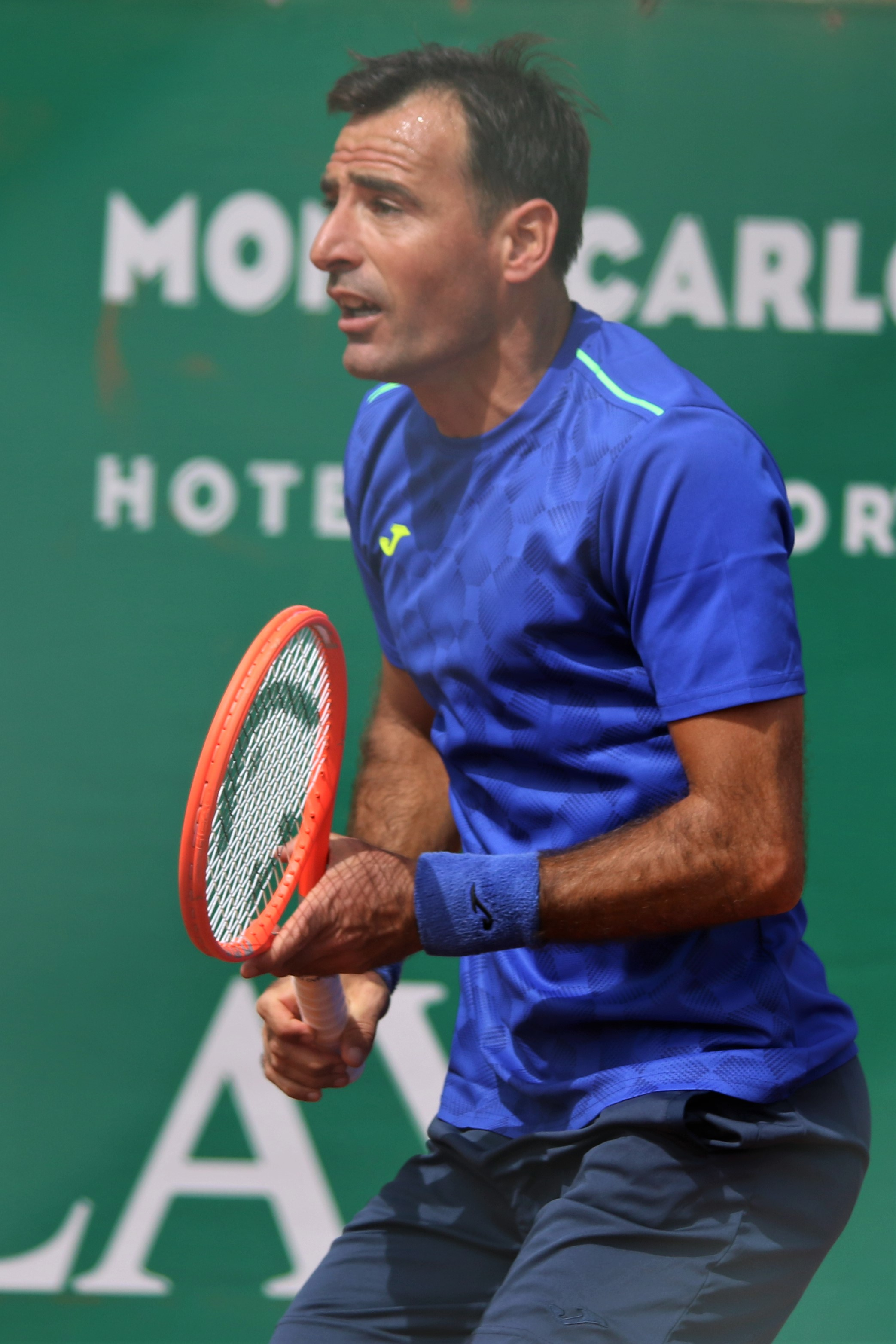
Dodig at the 2022 Monte-Carlo Masters

Dodig partnering Kristina Mladenovic won the mixed doubles event at the 2022 Australian Open. It was his second title at this Major and sixth Grand Slam title overall.

Partnering with Austin Krajicek they won their first title as a pair at the 2022 ATP Lyon Open, having reached the final at the 2021 Winston-Salem Open previously together.

At the 2022 French Open he reached his fourth Grand Slam doubles final in his career also partnering with Krajicek defeating en route World No. 1 and No. 2 and top seeds Joe Salisbury and Rajeev Ram and saving five match points in the quarterfinals. They lost to Marcelo Arevalo and Jean Julien Rojer in the final.

At the 2022 Halle Open and the 2022 Eastbourne International he reached the semifinals with Krajicek.

At the ATP 500 2022 Citi Open, he reached his 40th doubles career final. Then, he reached his 41st at the 2022 Firenze Open defeating Nicolas Mahut and Édouard Roger-Vasselin. At the 2022 Tennis Napoli Cup he won his second title with Krajicek as a team defeating home favorites Lorenzo Sonego / Andrea Vavassori to reach their fifth final of 2022 and Australian duo Matthew Ebden/John Peers in the final. He reached his third straight and sixth final for the season with Krajicek at the ATP 500 2022 Swiss Indoors in Basel defeating top seeds Arevalo/Rojer and the Kazakhstani duo of Andrey Golubev and Aleksandr Nedovyesov en route. The team won their third title together defeating Mahut/Roger-Vasselin.

At the 2022 Rolex Paris Masters Dodig and Krajicek reached the semifinals defeating Belgian pair Sander Gille/Joran Vliegen and top seeds Rajeev Ram/Joe Salisbury to reach their seventh final of the season climbing to World No. 9 and World No. 10 respectively. On 5 November, the pair qualified for the 2022 ATP Finals after defeating German duo Kevin Krawietz and Andreas Mies to reach their seventh final of 2022 as a team and eight for Dodig. Dodig reached back world No. 8 in the rankings on 7 November 2022.

=== 2023: 400th win, 20th doubles, Sixth Masters, Third Major titles, World No. 2 ===
Dodig won his twentieth title at the 2023 ABN AMRO Open in Rotterdam with Krajicek. Dodig and Krajicek won their first Masters title as a team at the 2023 Monte-Carlo Masters defeating Romain Arneodo and Sam Weissborn in the final and as a result Dodig moved back to world No. 5 in the rankings. The successful momentum the pair found on clay boosted Dodig and Krajicek to a second consecutive final at the 2023 French Open, where they won their maiden Major title together and third for Dodig. As a result, Dodig returned to world No. 4 equaling his career-high ranking.

He won his first grass court title with Krajicek at the 2023 Queen's Club Championships.

After reaching the semifinals at the US Open with Krajicek, he reached a new career high of World No. 2 in the ATP doubles rankings on 11 September 2023.

=== 2024–2025: Retirement, Davis Cup captain ===
At the BNP Paribas Open, he reached the quarterfinals with Krajicek for the sixth time at this Masters. At the Miami Open the pair reached the final but lost to top seeds Rohan Bopanna and Matthew Ebden. As the defending champions with Krajicek at the Monte-Carlo Masters and seeded second, having received a bye in the first round, they lost in the second round to Joran Vliegen and Sander Gille.

Playing with Skander Mansouri, Dodig was runner-up at the 2024 Belgrade Open, losing to Jamie Murray and John Peers in the final.

He retired following the 2025 US Open after more than 20 years on the Tour, and made his debut as Davis Cup captain when Croatia faced France in the second round in Osijek, Croatia in September 2025.

== Personal life ==
On 16 November 2013, Dodig married Maja Ćubela. On 16 June 2014, his wife gave birth to their son, Petar.

He is not directly related to fellow Croatian tennis player Matej Dodig.

== Controversies ==
During the trophy presentation at 2023 French Open – Men's doubles, Dodig expressed his disappointment with the French Open organizers, stating that he was not treated like every athlete should be. Dodig claimed that he had traveled by taxi for 15 days, often experiencing delays and feeling like a tourist in Paris. He emphasized the importance of treating all players equally in order to maintain fair competition.

In response to Dodig's criticism, tournament director Amelie Mauresmo considered his language "unacceptable" and sought to clarify the situation. Mauresmo pointed out that there were numerous hotels within a three-mile radius of the venue and that any player could book transportation within a five-kilometer range. She mentioned that Dodig had chosen a hotel in a different part of Paris, far from the tournament site, but alternative options were offered to him. However, Mauresmo explained that the organizers aimed to prioritize environmental sustainability and had limited resources, including a conscious approach to transportation.

== Significant finals ==
=== Grand Slam finals ===
==== Doubles: 5 (3 titles, 2 runner-ups) ====
Result	Year	Championship	Surface	Partner	Opponents	Score
Loss	2013	Wimbledon	Grass	(Brazil) Marcelo Melo	(United States) Bob Bryan (United States) Mike Bryan	6–3, 3–6, 4–6, 4–6
Win	2015	French Open	Clay	(Brazil) Marcelo Melo	(United States) Bob Bryan (United States) Mike Bryan	6–7^{(5–7)}, 7–6^{(7–5)}, 7–5
Win	2021	Australian Open	Hard	(Slovakia) Filip Polášek	(United States) Rajeev Ram (United Kingdom) Joe Salisbury	6–3, 6–4
Loss	2022	French Open	Clay	(United States) Austin Krajicek	(El Salvador) Marcelo Arévalo (Netherlands) Jean-Julien Rojer	7–6^{(7–4)}, 6–7^{(5–7)}, 3–6
Win	2023	French Open (2)	Clay	(United States) Austin Krajicek	(Belgium) Sander Gillé (Belgium) Joran Vliegen	6–3, 6–1

==== Mixed doubles: 6 (4 titles, 2 runner-ups) ====
Result	Year	Championship	Surface	Partner	Opponents	Score
Loss	2016	French Open	Clay	(India) Sania Mirza	(Switzerland) Martina Hingis (India) Leander Paes	6–4, 4–6, [8–10]
Loss	2017	Australian Open	Hard	(India) Sania Mirza	(United States) Abigail Spears (Colombia) Juan Sebastián Cabal	2–6, 4–6
Win	2018	French Open	Clay	(Chinese Taipei) Latisha Chan	(Canada) Gabriela Dabrowski (Croatia) Mate Pavić	6–1, 6–7^{(5–7)}, [10–8]
Win	2019	French Open (2)	Clay	(Chinese Taipei) Latisha Chan	(Canada) Gabriela Dabrowski (Croatia) Mate Pavić	6–2, 7–6^{(7–5)}
Win	2019	Wimbledon	Grass	(Chinese Taipei) Latisha Chan	(Latvia) Jeļena Ostapenko (Sweden) Robert Lindstedt	6–2, 6–3
Win	2022	Australian Open	Hard	(France) Kristina Mladenovic	(Australia) Jaimee Fourlis (Australia) Jason Kubler	6–3, 6–4

=== Olympic finals ===
==== Doubles: 1 (1 silver medal) ====
Result	Year	Tournament	Surface	Partner	Opponents	Score
Silver	2021	2020 Summer Olympics, Japan	Hard	(Croatia) Marin Čilić	(Croatia) Nikola Mektić (Croatia) Mate Pavić	4–6, 6–3, [6–10]

=== Year-end championships ===
==== Doubles: 1 (1 runner-up) ====
Outcome	Year	Championship	Surface	Partner	Opponents	Score
Loss	2014	World Tour Finals, London	Hard (i)	(Brazil) Marcelo Melo	(United States) Bob Bryan (United States) Mike Bryan	7–6 ^{(7–5)}, 2–6, [7–10]

=== Masters 1000 finals ===
==== Doubles: 13 (6 titles, 7 runner-ups) ====
Result	Year	Tournament	Surface	Partner	Opponents	Score
Win	2013	Shanghai Masters	Hard	(Brazil) Marcelo Melo	(Spain) David Marrero (Spain) Fernando Verdasco	7–6^{(7–2)}, 6–7^{(6–8)}, [10–2]
Loss	2014	Monte-Carlo Masters	Clay	(Brazil) Marcelo Melo	(United States) Bob Bryan (United States) Mike Bryan	3–6, 6–3, [8–10]
Loss	2014	Canadian Open	Hard	(Brazil) Marcelo Melo	(Austria) Alexander Peya (Brazil) Bruno Soares	4–6, 3–6
Win	2015	Paris Masters	Hard (i)	(Brazil) Marcelo Melo	(Canada) Vasek Pospisil (United States) Jack Sock	2–6, 6–3, [10–5]
Win	2016	Canadian Open	Hard	(Brazil) Marcelo Melo	(United Kingdom) Jamie Murray (Brazil) Bruno Soares	6–4, 6–4
Win	2016	Cincinnati Masters	Hard	(Brazil) Marcelo Melo	(Netherlands) Jean-Julien Rojer (Romania) Horia Tecău	7–6^{(7–5)}, 6–7^{(5–7)}, [10–6]
Loss	2017	Italian Open	Clay	(Spain) Marcel Granollers	(France) Pierre-Hugues Herbert (France) Nicolas Mahut	6–4, 4–6, [3–10]
Loss	2017	Canadian Open	Hard	(India) Rohan Bopanna	(France) Pierre-Hugues Herbert (France) Nicolas Mahut	4–6, 6–3, [6–10]
Loss	2017	Paris Masters	Hard (i)	(Spain) Marcel Granollers	(Poland) Łukasz Kubot (Brazil) Marcelo Melo	6–7^{(3–7)}, 6–3, [6–10]
Win	2019	Cincinnati Masters (2)	Hard	(Slovakia) Filip Polášek	(Colombia) Juan Sebastián Cabal (Colombia) Robert Farah	4–6, 6–4, [10–6]
Loss	2022	Paris Masters	Hard (i)	(United States) Austin Krajicek	(Netherlands) Wesley Koolhof (United Kingdom) Neal Skupski	6–7^{(5–7)}, 4–6
Win	2023	Monte-Carlo Masters	Clay	(United States) Austin Krajicek	(Monaco) Romain Arneodo (Austria) Sam Weissborn	6–0, 4–6, [14–12]
Loss	2024	Miami Open	Hard	(United States) Austin Krajicek	(India) Rohan Bopanna (Australia) Matthew Ebden	7–6^{(7–3)}, 3–6, [6–10]

== ATP career finals ==
=== Singles: 2 (1 title, 1 runner-up) ===
Legend Grand Slam tournaments (0–0) ATP World Tour Finals (0–0) ATP World Tour Masters 1000 (0–0) ATP World Tour 500 Series (0–0) ATP World Tour 250 Series (1–1)	Finals by surface Hard (1–0) Clay (0–0) Grass (0–1)	Finals by setting Outdoor (0–1) Indoor (1–0)

Result	W–L	Date	Tournament	Tier	Surface	Opponent	Score
Win	1–0	Feb 2011	Zagreb Indoors, Croatia	250 Series	Hard (i)	(Germany) Michael Berrer	6–3, 6–4
Loss	1–1	Jun 2011	Rosmalen Grass Court Championships, Netherlands	250 Series	Grass	(Russia) Dmitry Tursunov	3–6, 2–6

=== Doubles: 54 (24 titles, 30 runner-ups) ===
Legend Grand Slam tournaments (3–2) ATP World Tour Finals (0–1) ATP World Tour Masters 1000 (6–7) Summer Olympics (0–1) ATP World Tour 500 Series (9–6) ATP World Tour 250 Series (6–13)	Finals by surface Hard (16–21) Clay (7–5) Grass (1–4)	Finals by setting Outdoor (18–22) Indoor (6–8)

Result	W–L	Date	Tournament	Tier	Surface	Partner	Opponents	Score
Loss	0–1	Feb 2012	Zagreb Indoors, Croatia	250 Series	Hard (i)	(Croatia) Mate Pavić	(Cyprus) Marcos Baghdatis (Russia) Mikhail Youzhny	2–6, 2–6
Loss	0–2	Feb 2012	U.S. National Indoor Tennis Championships, US	500 Series	Hard (i)	(Brazil) Marcelo Melo	(Belarus) Max Mirnyi (Canada) Daniel Nestor	6–4, 5–7, [7–10]
Loss	0–3	Feb 2013	Zagreb Indoors, Croatia	250 Series	Hard (i)	(Croatia) Mate Pavić	(Austria) Julian Knowle (Slovakia) Filip Polášek	3–6, 3–6
Loss	0–4	Jul 2013	Wimbledon, UK	Grand Slam	Grass	(Brazil) Marcelo Melo	(United States) Bob Bryan (United States) Mike Bryan	6–3, 3–6, 4–6, 4–6
Win	1–4	Oct 2013	Shanghai Masters, China	Masters 1000	Hard	(Brazil) Marcelo Melo	(Spain) David Marrero (Spain) Fernando Verdasco	7–6^{(7–2)}, 6–7^{(6–8)}, [10–2]
Loss	1–5	Apr 2014	Monte-Carlo Masters, Monaco	Masters 1000	Clay	(Brazil) Marcelo Melo	(United States) Bob Bryan (United States) Mike Bryan	3–6, 6–3, [8–10]
Loss	1–6	Aug 2014	Canadian Open, Canada	Masters 1000	Hard	(Brazil) Marcelo Melo	(Austria) Alexander Peya (Brazil) Bruno Soares	4–6, 3–6
Loss	1–7	Oct 2014	Japan Open, Japan	500 Series	Hard	(Brazil) Marcelo Melo	(France) Pierre-Hugues Herbert (Poland) Michał Przysiężny	3–6, 7–6^{(7–3)}, [5–10]
Loss	1–8	Nov 2014	ATP World Tour Finals, UK	Tour Finals	Hard (i)	(Brazil) Marcelo Melo	(United States) Bob Bryan (United States) Mike Bryan	7–6^{(7–5)}, 2–6, [7–10]
Win	2–8	Mar 2015	Mexican Open, Mexico	500 Series	Hard	(Brazil) Marcelo Melo	(Poland) Mariusz Fyrstenberg (Mexico) Santiago González	7–6^{(7–2)}, 5–7, [10–3]
Win	3–8	Jun 2015	French Open, France	Grand Slam	Clay	(Brazil) Marcelo Melo	(United States) Bob Bryan (United States) Mike Bryan	6–7^{(5–7)}, 7–6^{(7–5)}, 7–5
Loss	3–9	Aug 2015	Washington Open, US	500 Series	Hard	(Brazil) Marcelo Melo	(United States) Bob Bryan (United States) Mike Bryan	4–6, 2–6
Win	4–9	Nov 2015	Paris Masters, France	Masters 1000	Hard (i)	(Brazil) Marcelo Melo	(Canada) Vasek Pospisil (United States) Jack Sock	2–6, 6–3, [10–5]
Loss	4–10	Jun 2016	Nottingham Open, UK	250 Series	Grass	(Brazil) Marcelo Melo	(United Kingdom) Dominic Inglot (Canada) Daniel Nestor	5–7, 6–7^{(4–7)}
Win	5–10	Aug 2016	Canadian Open, Canada	Masters 1000	Hard	(Brazil) Marcelo Melo	(United Kingdom) Jamie Murray (Brazil) Bruno Soares	6–4, 6–4
Win	6–10	Aug 2016	Cincinnati Masters, US	Masters 1000	Hard	(Brazil) Marcelo Melo	(Netherlands) Jean-Julien Rojer (Romania) Horia Tecău	7–6^{(7–5)}, 6–7^{(5–7)}, [10–6]
Win	7–10	Feb 2017	Rotterdam Open, Netherlands	500 Series	Hard (i)	(Spain) Marcel Granollers	(Netherlands) Wesley Koolhof (Netherlands) Matwé Middelkoop	7–6^{(7–5)}, 6–3
Loss	7–11	May 2017	Italian Open, Italy	Masters 1000	Clay	(Spain) Marcel Granollers	(France) Pierre-Hugues Herbert (France) Nicolas Mahut	6–4, 4–6, [3–10]
Win	8–11	Jul 2017	German Open, Germany	500 Series	Clay	(Croatia) Mate Pavić	(Uruguay) Pablo Cuevas (Spain) Marc López	6–3, 6–4
Loss	8–12	Aug 2017	Canadian Open, Canada	Masters 1000	Hard	(India) Rohan Bopanna	(France) Pierre-Hugues Herbert (France) Nicolas Mahut	4–6, 6–3, [6–10]
Win	9–12	Oct 2017	Swiss Indoors, Switzerland	500 Series	Hard (i)	(Spain) Marcel Granollers	(France) Fabrice Martin (France) Édouard Roger-Vasselin	7–5, 7–6^{(8–6)}
Loss	9–13	Nov 2017	Paris Masters, France	Masters 1000	Hard (i)	(Spain) Marcel Granollers	(Poland) Łukasz Kubot (Brazil) Marcelo Melo	6–7^{(3–7)}, 6–3, [6–10]
Win	10–13	May 2018	Bavarian Championships, Germany	250 Series	Clay	(United States) Rajeev Ram	(Croatia) Nikola Mektić (Austria) Alexander Peya	6–3, 7–5
Loss	10–14	May 2018	Geneva Open, Switzerland	250 Series	Clay	(United States) Rajeev Ram	(Austria) Oliver Marach (Croatia) Mate Pavić	6–3, 6–7^{(3–7)}, [9–11]
Win	11–14	Sep 2018	Chengdu Open, China	250 Series	Hard	(Croatia) Mate Pavić	(United States) Austin Krajicek (India) Jeevan Nedunchezhiyan	6–2, 6–4
Win	12–14	Feb 2019	Open Sud de France, France	250 Series	Hard (i)	(France) Édouard Roger-Vasselin	(France) Benjamin Bonzi (France) Antoine Hoang	6–4, 6–3
Win	13–14	May 2019	Lyon Open, France	250 Series	Clay	(France) Édouard Roger-Vasselin	(United Kingdom) Ken Skupski (United Kingdom) Neal Skupski	6–4, 6–3
Loss	13–15	Jun 2019	Antalya Open, Turkey	250 Series	Grass	(Slovakia) Filip Polášek	(Israel) Jonathan Erlich (New Zealand) Artem Sitak	3–6, 4–6
Win	14–15	Aug 2019	Cincinnati Masters, US (2)	Masters 1000	Hard	(Slovakia) Filip Polášek	(Colombia) Juan Sebastián Cabal (Colombia) Robert Farah	4–6, 6–4, [10–6]
Win	15–15	Oct 2019	China Open, China	500 Series	Hard	(Slovakia) Filip Polášek	(Poland) Łukasz Kubot (Brazil) Marcelo Melo	6–3, 7–6^{(7–4)}
Loss	15–16	Jan 2020	Adelaide International, Australia	250 Series	Hard	(Slovakia) Filip Polášek	(Argentina) Máximo González (France) Fabrice Martin	6–7^{(12–14)}, 3–6
Loss	15–17	Sep 2020	Hamburg Open, Germany	500 Series	Clay	(Croatia) Mate Pavić	(Australia) John Peers (New Zealand) Michael Venus	3–6, 4–6
Loss	15–18	Jan 2021	Antalya Open, Turkey	250 Series	Hard	(Slovakia) Filip Polášek	(Croatia) Nikola Mektić (Croatia) Mate Pavić	2–6, 4–6
Win	16–18	Feb 2021	Australian Open, Australia	Grand Slam	Hard	(Slovakia) Filip Polášek	(United States) Rajeev Ram (United Kingdom) Joe Salisbury	6–3, 6–4
Loss	16–19	Jul 2021	Summer Olympics, Japan	Olympics	Hard	(Croatia) Marin Čilić	(Croatia) Nikola Mektić (Croatia) Mate Pavić	6–3, 3–6, [6–10]
Loss	16–20	Aug 2021	Winston-Salem Open, United States	250 Series	Hard	(United States) Austin Krajicek	(El Salvador) Marcelo Arévalo (Netherlands) Matwé Middelkoop	7–6^{(7–5)}, 5–7, [6–10]
Loss	16–21	Jan 2022	Adelaide International, Australia	250 Series	Hard	(Brazil) Marcelo Melo	(India) Rohan Bopanna (India) Ramkumar Ramanathan	6–7^{(6–8)}, 1–6
Win	17–21	May 2022	Lyon Open, France (2)	250 Series	Clay	(United States) Austin Krajicek	(Argentina) Máximo González (Brazil) Marcelo Melo	6–3, 6–4
Loss	17–22	Jun 2022	French Open, France	Grand Slam	Clay	(United States) Austin Krajicek	(El Salvador) Marcelo Arévalo (Netherlands) Jean-Julien Rojer	7–6^{(7–4)}, 6–7^{(5–7)}, 3–6
Loss	17–23	Aug 2022	Washington Open, US	500 Series	Hard	(United States) Austin Krajicek	(Australia) Nick Kyrgios (United States) Jack Sock	5–7, 4–6
Loss	17–24	Oct 2022	Firenze Open, Italy	250 Series	Hard (i)	(United States) Austin Krajicek	(France) Nicolas Mahut (France) Édouard Roger-Vasselin	6–7^{(4–7)}, 3–6
Win	18–24	Oct 2022	Tennis Napoli Cup, Italy	250 Series	Hard	(United States) Austin Krajicek	(Australia) Matthew Ebden (Australia) John Peers	6–3, 1–6, [10–8]
Win	19–24	Oct 2022	Swiss Indoors, Switzerland (2)	500 Series	Hard (i)	(United States) Austin Krajicek	(France) Nicolas Mahut (France) Édouard Roger-Vasselin	6–4, 7–6^{(7–5)}
Loss	19–25	Nov 2022	Paris Masters, France	Masters 1000	Hard (i)	(United States) Austin Krajicek	(Netherlands) Wesley Koolhof (United Kingdom) Neal Skupski	6–7^{(5–7)}, 4–6
Loss	19–26	Jan 2023	Adelaide International 2, Australia	250 Series	Hard	(United States) Austin Krajicek	(El Salvador) Marcelo Arévalo (Netherlands) Jean-Julien Rojer	Walkover
Win	20–26	Feb 2023	Rotterdam Open, Netherlands (2)	500 Series	Hard (i)	(United States) Austin Krajicek	(India) Rohan Bopanna (Australia) Matthew Ebden	7–6^{(7–5)}, 2–6, [12–10]
Win	21–26	Apr 2023	Monte-Carlo Masters, Monaco	Masters 1000	Clay	(United States) Austin Krajicek	(Monaco) Romain Arneodo (Austria) Sam Weissborn	6–0, 4–6, [14–12]
Win	22–26	Jun 2023	French Open, France (2)	Grand Slam	Clay	(United States) Austin Krajicek	(Belgium) Sander Gillé (Belgium) Joran Vliegen	6–3, 6–1
Win	23–26	Jun 2023	Queen's Club, United Kingdom	500 Series	Grass	(United States) Austin Krajicek	(United States) Taylor Fritz (Czech Republic) Jiří Lehečka	6–4, 6–7^{(5–7)}, [10–3]
Loss	23–27	Jun 2023	Eastbourne International, United Kingdom	250 Series	Grass	(United States) Austin Krajicek	(Croatia) Nikola Mektić (Croatia) Mate Pavić	4–6, 2–6
Win	24–27	Oct 2023	China Open, China	500 Series	Hard	(United States) Austin Krajicek	(Netherlands) Wesley Koolhof (United Kingdom) Neal Skupski	6–7^{(12–14)}, 6–3, [10–5]
Loss	24–28	Mar 2024	Dubai Tennis Championships, UAE	500 Series	Hard	(United States) Austin Krajicek	(Netherlands) Tallon Griekspoor (Germany) Jan-Lennard Struff	4–6, 6–4, [6–10]
Loss	24–29	Mar 2024	Miami Open, United States	Masters 1000	Hard	(United States) Austin Krajicek	(India) Rohan Bopanna (Australia) Matthew Ebden	7–6^{(7–3)}, 3–6, [6–10]
Loss	24–30	Nov 2024	Belgrade Open, Serbia	250 Series	Hard (i)	(Tunisia) Skander Mansouri	(United Kingdom) Jamie Murray (Australia) John Peers	6–3, 6–7^{(5–7)}, [9–11]

== Team competition finals ==
=== Davis Cup: 2 (1 title, 1 runner-up) ===
Result	Date	Tournament	Surface	Partners	Opponents	Score
Loss	Nov 2016	Davis Cup, Zagreb, Croatia	Hard (i)	(Croatia) Marin Čilić (Croatia) Ivo Karlović (Croatia) Franko Škugor	(Argentina) Juan Martín del Potro (Argentina) Federico Delbonis (Argentina) Leonardo Mayer (Argentina) Guido Pella	2–3
Win	Nov 2018	Davis Cup, Lille, France	Clay (i)	(Croatia) Marin Čilić (Croatia) Borna Ćorić (Croatia) Viktor Galović (Croatia) Nikola Mektić (Croatia) Mate Pavić	(France) Julien Benneteau (France) Jérémy Chardy (France) Richard Gasquet (France) Pierre-Hugues Herbert (France) Nicolas Mahut (France) Adrian Mannarino (France) Benoît Paire (France) Lucas Pouille (France) Jo-Wilfried Tsonga	3–1

== Performance timelines ==
Key
W	F	SF	QF	#R	RR	Q#	P#	DNQ	A	Z#	PO	G	S	B	NMS	NTI	P	NH

(W) winner; (F) finalist; (SF) semifinalist; (QF) quarterfinalist; (#R) rounds 4, 3, 2, 1; (RR) round-robin stage; (Q#) qualification round; (P#) preliminary round; (DNQ) did not qualify; (A) absent; (Z#) Davis/Fed Cup Zonal Group (with number indication) or (PO) play-off; (G) gold, (S) silver or (B) bronze Olympic/Paralympic medal; (NMS) not a Masters tournament; (NTI) not a Tier I tournament; (P) postponed; (NH) not held; (SR) strike rate (events won / competed); (W–L) win–loss record.
To avoid confusion and double counting, these charts are updated at the conclusion of a tournament or when the player's participation has ended.

=== Singles ===
Tournament	2008	2009	2010	2011	2012	2013	2014	2015	2016	2017	SR	W–L	Win %
Grand Slam tournaments
Australian Open	A	A	2R	2R	1R	3R	2R	2R	1R	1R	0 / 8	6–8	43%
French Open	A	Q2	Q1	1R	1R	1R	1R	1R	2R	A	0 / 6	1–6	14%
Wimbledon	A	Q1	2R	1R	1R	4R	A	Q3	1R	A	0 / 5	4–5	44%
US Open	A	Q1	2R	1R	2R	3R	1R	Q3	1R	A	0 / 6	4–6	40%
Win–loss	0–0	0–0	3–3	1–4	1–4	7–4	1–3	1–2	1–4	0–1	0 / 25	15–25	38%
Olympic Games
Summer Olympics	A	Not Held			1R	Not Held			A	NH	0 / 1	0–1	0%
ATP World Tour Masters 1000
Indian Wells Masters	A	A	A	A	1R	3R	2R	2R	1R	Q1	0 / 5	3–5	38%
Miami Open	A	A	Q2	2R	2R	2R	2R	A	1R	Q1	0 / 5	4–5	44%
Monte-Carlo Masters	A	A	Q1	1R	2R	1R	1R	A	A	A	0 / 4	1–4	20%
Italian Open	A	A	A	A	A	A	3R	Q2	A	A	0 / 1	2–1	67%
Madrid Open	A	A	A	A	A	A	1R	Q1	Q1	Q1	0 / 1	0–1	0%
Canadian Open	A	Q2	A	3R	Q2	2R	3R	A	1R	A	0 / 4	5–4	56%
Cincinnati Masters	A	A	A	2R	1R	Q1	1R	Q1	Q1	A	0 / 3	1–3	25%
Shanghai Masters	A	A	A	1R	A	1R	2R	A	A	A	0 / 3	1–3	25%
Paris Masters	A	A	A	2R	A	2R	A	Q1	A	A	0 / 2	2–2	50%
Win–loss	0–0	0–0	0–0	5–6	2–4	5–6	6–8	1–1	0–3	0–0	0 / 28	19–28	40%
Career statistics
Tournaments played	1	2	7	24	23	25	23	11	21	2	139		
Titles/Finals	0–0	0–0	0–0	1–2	0–0	0–0	0–0	0–0	0–0	0–0	1–2		
Hardcourt win–loss	0–1	2–1	6–5	17–16	10–14	20–16	11–17	6–8	2–10	0–1	1 / 85	74–89	45%
Grass win–loss	0–0	0–0	1–1	5–3	3–4	7–3	0–0	0–0	1–3	0–0	0 / 14	17–14	55%
Clay win–loss	0–0	0–1	1–1	4–6	3–8	6–8	4–6	2–3	4–3	3–1	0 / 33	27–37	42%
Overall win–loss	0–1	2–2	8–7	26–25	16–26	33–27	15–23	8–11	7–16	3–2	1 / 139	118–140	46%
Win %	0%	50%	53%	51%	38%	55%	39%	42%	30%	60%	$ 10,533,904		
Year-end ranking	422	180	88	36	72	33	95	87	147	336			

=== Doubles ===
Current through 2025.

Tournament	2011	2012	2013	2014	2015	2016	2017	2018	2019	2020	2021	2022	2023	2024	2025	SR	W–L	Win%
Grand Slam tournaments
Australian Open	2R	1R	1R	3R	SF	3R	QF	1R	2R	SF	W	2R	1R	2R	2R	1 / 15	26–14	65%
French Open	2R	QF	3R	A	W	SF	QF	2R	1R	3R	2R	F	W	2R	QF	2 / 14	38–12	76%
Wimbledon	1R	QF	F	A	QF	3R	3R	1R	SF	NH	2R	3R	2R	1R	1R	0 / 13	23–12	66%
US Open	1R	3R	SF	SF	1R	1R	3R	3R	1R	1R	3R	2R	SF	3R	1R	0 / 15	23–15	61%
Win–loss	2–4	8–4	11–4	6–2	13–3	8–4	10–4	3–4	5–4	6–3	10–3	9–3	11–3	4–4	4–4	3 / 57	110–53	67%
Olympic Games
Summer Olympics	NH	QF	Not Held			A	Not Held				S	Not Held		A	NH	0 / 2	6–2	75%
Year-end championship
ATP Finals	DNQ		SF	F	SF	RR	RR	DNQ	RR	DNQ	RR	RR	RR	DNQ		0 / 8	12–14	46%
ATP Masters Series
Indian Wells Masters	A	A	QF	QF	SF	1R	1R	QF	1R	NH	SF	1R	A	QF	1R	0 / 11	14–11	56%
Miami Open	A	A	2R	2R	A	2R	QF	1R	SF	NH	SF	2R	A	F	1R	0 / 10	16–10	62%
Monte-Carlo Masters	A	A	2R	F	SF	SF	QF	2R	2R	NH	2R	1R	W	2R	A	1 / 11	16–10	62%
Madrid Open	A	A	A	2R	2R	SF	QF	2R	1R	NH	QF	QF	1R	1R	1R	0 / 11	6–11	35%
Italian Open	A	A	A	QF	QF	2R	F	A	1R	1R	2R	1R	2R	A	A	0 / 9	7–9	44%
Canadian Open	A	2R	QF	F	2R	W	F	1R	1R	NH	QF	1R	2R	1R	A	1 / 12	13–11	54%
Cincinnati Masters	A	SF	1R	2R	SF	W	QF	2R	W	1R	1R	1R	SF	SF	A	2 / 13	21–11	66%
Shanghai Masters	QF	A	W	QF	A	A	QF	QF	QF	Not Held			1R	2R	A	1 / 8	12–7	63%
Paris Masters	A	A	SF	2R	W	A	F	A	SF	A	2R	F	QF	2R	A	1 / 9	17–8	68%
Win–loss	2–1	4–2	10–6	11–9	12–6	13–5	15–9	4–7	14–8	0–2	10–8	6–8	8–6	11–8	0–3	6 / 94	120–88	58%
Career statistics
	2011	2012	2013	2014	2015	2016	2017	2018	2019	2020	2021	2022	2023	2024	2025	Total		
Titles	0	0	1	0	3	2	3	2	4	0	1	3	5	0	0	24		
Finals	0	2	3	4	4	3	6	3	5	2	4	8	7	3	0	54		
Overall win–loss	12–18	29–21	31–25	30–22	38–16	32–18	43–23	34–26	46–27	16–10	38–26	43–27	40–18	30–25	10–16	475–326		
Year-end ranking	93	31	7	12	6	13	5	35	12	16	12	9	2	26	113	59%		

=== Mixed doubles ===
Tournament	2013	2014	2015	2016	2017	2018	2019	2020	2021	2022	2023	2024	2025	SR	W–L
Australian Open	A	A	1R	SF	F	A	1R	QF	1R	W	A	A	1R	1 / 8	14–7
French Open	A	A	A	F	QF	W	W	NH	1R	2R	2R	1R	A	2 / 8	18–6
Wimbledon	2R	A	2R	2R	3R	QF	W	NH	3R	2R	QF	1R	A	1 / 10	13–8
US Open	A	A	A	2R	1R	2R	SF	NH	2R	A	1R	1R	A	0 / 8	6–6
Win–loss	0–1	0–0	1–2	8–4	7–4	8–1	13–2	2–1	2–4	7–1	3–3	0–3	0–1	4 / 34	50–27

- At the 2018 US Open, Dodig and Chan withdrew before their second round match, this is not counted as a loss.
- At the 2022 Wimbledon, Dodig and Chan withdrew before their second round match, this is not counted as a loss.

== Top 10 wins ==
- Dodig has a 4–24 record against players who were, at the time the match was played, ranked in the top 10.

Season	2008	2009	2010	2011	2012	2013	2014	2015	2016	2017	2018	2019	2020	2021	Total
Wins	0	0	0	2	1	1	0	0	0	0	0	0	0	0	4

#	Player	Rank	Event	Surface	Rd	Score	ID Rank
2011
1.	(Sweden) Robin Söderling	5	Barcelona, Spain	Clay	2R	6–2, 6–4	56
2.	(Spain) Rafael Nadal	2	Montreal, Canada	Hard	2R	1–6, 7–6^{(7–5)}, 7–6^{(7–5)}	41
2012
3.	(France) Jo-Wilfried Tsonga	5	Queen's Club, London, United Kingdom	Grass	3R	7–6^{(7–3)}, 3–6, 7–6^{(7–5)}	69
2013
4.	(France) Jo-Wilfried Tsonga	8	Tokyo, Japan	Hard	2R	6–4, 7–6^{(7–5)}	34
