= 2014 Monte-Carlo Rolex Masters – Doubles =

Doubles
- 2014 Monte-Carlo Rolex Masters

Final
- Champions: (United States) Bob Bryan (United States) Mike Bryan
- Runners-up: (Croatia) Ivan Dodig (Brazil) Marcelo Melo
- Score: 6–3, 3–6, [10–8]

Events
Singles	Doubles
← 2013 ·	Monte-Carlo Rolex Masters	· 2015 →

Julien Benneteau and Nenad Zimonjić were the defending champions, but decided not to participate together. Benneteau played alongside Édouard Roger-Vasselin, but lost to Bob and Mike Bryan in the quarterfinals. Zimonjić teamed up with Daniel Nestor, but lost to the Bryan brothers in the semifinals. The Bryans became the new champions, defeating Ivan Dodig and Marcelo Melo 6–3, 3–6, [10–8] in the final.

== Seeds ==
1. (United States) Bob Bryan / (United States) Mike Bryan (champions)
2. (Austria) Alexander Peya / (Brazil) Bruno Soares (quarterfinals)
3. (Croatia) Ivan Dodig / (Brazil) Marcelo Melo (final)
4. (Spain) David Marrero / (Spain) Fernando Verdasco (withdrew)
5. (Canada) Daniel Nestor / (Serbia) Nenad Zimonjić (semifinals)
6. (France) Michaël Llodra / (France) Nicolas Mahut (second round)
7. (Poland) Łukasz Kubot / (Sweden) Robert Lindstedt (second round)
8. (France) Julien Benneteau / (France) Édouard Roger-Vasselin (quarterfinals)

== Draw ==
=== Key ===
- Q = Qualifier
- WC = Wild card
- LL = Lucky loser
- Alt = Alternate
- SE = Special exempt
- PR = Protected ranking
- ITF = ITF entry
- JE = Junior exempt
- w/o = Walkover
- r = Retired
- d = Defaulted
- SR = Special ranking

=== Finals ===
Semifinals
1	(United States) Bob Bryan (United States) Mike Bryan	7^{7}	6
5	(Canada) Daniel Nestor (Serbia) Nenad Zimonjić	6^{5}	3
3	(Croatia) Ivan Dodig (Brazil) Marcelo Melo	6	1	[10]
(Belarus) Max Mirnyi (Russia) Mikhail Youzhny	3	6	[6]

Final
1	(United States) Bob Bryan (United States) Mike Bryan	6	3	[10]
3	(Croatia) Ivan Dodig (Brazil) Marcelo Melo	3	6	[8]

=== Top half ===
First round
(Czech Republic) L Rosol (Czech Republic) R Štěpánek	6	7^{7}
(Croatia) M Čilić (Austria) O Marach	2	6^{5}
(Latvia) E Gulbis (Canada) M Raonic	4	4
(Colombia) JS Cabal (Colombia) R Farah	6	6
(Netherlands) J-J Rojer (Romania) H Tecău	6	3	[8]
WC	(Monaco) R Arneodo (Monaco) B Balleret	2	6	[10]
(Spain) M Granollers (Spain) M López	3	4
(Poland) M Fyrstenberg (Poland) M Matkowski	6	6

Second round
1	(United States) B Bryan (United States) M Bryan	6	7^{7}
(Czech Republic) L Rosol (Czech Republic) R Štěpánek	4	6^{4}
(Colombia) JS Cabal (Colombia) R Farah	4	7	[4]
8	(France) J Benneteau (France) É Roger-Vasselin	6	5	[10]
Alt	(Spain) R Bautista Agut (Italy) A Seppi	4	6	[9]
WC	(Monaco) R Arneodo (Monaco) B Balleret	6	3	[11]
(Poland) M Fyrstenberg (Poland) M Matkowski	7^{8}	6^{3}	[7]
5	(Canada) D Nestor (Serbia) N Zimonjić	6^{6}	7^{7}	[10]

Quarterfinals
1	(United States) B Bryan (United States) M Bryan	6	6
8	(France) J Benneteau (France) É Roger-Vasselin	1	2
WC	(Monaco) R Arneodo (Monaco) B Balleret	4	3
5	(Canada) D Nestor (Serbia) N Zimonjić	6	6

Semifinals
1	(United States) B Bryan (United States) M Bryan	7^{7}	6
5	(Canada) D Nestor (Serbia) N Zimonjić	6^{5}	3

=== Bottom half ===
First round
(India) R Bopanna (Pakistan) A-u-H Qureshi	7^{7}	6
(Austria) J Knowle (Canada) V Pospisil	6^{2}	4
WC	(France) J Chardy (France) G Simon	6	2	[10]
PR	(South Africa) K Anderson (Austria) J Melzer	4	6	[4]
(United States) E Butorac (South Africa) R Klaasen	5	1
(Belarus) M Mirnyi (Russia) M Youzhny	7	6
PR	(Italy) S Bolelli (Italy) F Fognini	6	3	[10]
(Philippines) T Huey (United Kingdom) D Inglot	2	6	[7]

Second round
7	(Poland) Ł Kubot (Sweden) R Lindstedt	3	0
(India) R Bopanna (Pakistan) A-u-H Qureshi	6	6
WC	(France) J Chardy (France) G Simon	2	7^{7}	[11]
3	(Croatia) I Dodig (Brazil) M Melo	6	6^{3}	[13]
6	(France) M Llodra (France) N Mahut	6^{4}	4
(Belarus) M Mirnyi (Russia) M Youzhny	7^{7}	6
PR	(Italy) S Bolelli (Italy) F Fognini	2	3
2	(Austria) A Peya (Brazil) B Soares	6	6

Quarterfinals
(India) R Bopanna (Pakistan) A-u-H Qureshi	6^{4}	5
3	(Croatia) I Dodig (Brazil) M Melo	7^{7}	7
(Belarus) M Mirnyi (Russia) M Youzhny	7^{7}	3	[11]
2	(Austria) A Peya (Brazil) B Soares	6^{5}	6	[9]

Semifinals
3	(Croatia) I Dodig (Brazil) M Melo	6	1	[10]
(Belarus) M Mirnyi (Russia) M Youzhny	3	6	[6]
