= 2013 Shanghai Rolex Masters – Doubles =

Doubles
- 2013 Shanghai Rolex Masters

Final
- Champions: (Croatia) Ivan Dodig (Brazil) Marcelo Melo
- Runners-up: (Spain) David Marrero (Spain) Fernando Verdasco
- Score: 7–6^{(7–2)}, 6–7^{(6–8)}, [10–2]

Events
Singles	Doubles
← 2012 ·	Shanghai Masters	· 2014 →

Leander Paes and Radek Štěpánek were the defending champions, but Štěpánek chose not to compete. Paes played alongside Daniel Nestor, but lost in the second round to Robert Lindstedt and Vasek Pospisil.
Ivan Dodig and Marcelo Melo won the title, defeating David Marrero and Fernando Verdasco in the final, 7–6^{(7–2)}, 6–7^{(6–8)}, [10–2].

== Seeds ==
All seeds receive a bye into the second round.

1. (United States) Bob Bryan / (United States) Mike Bryan (semifinals)
2. (Spain) Marcel Granollers / (Spain) Marc López (quarterfinals)
3. (Canada) Daniel Nestor / (India) Leander Paes (second round)
4. (Pakistan) Aisam-ul-Haq Qureshi / (Netherlands) Jean-Julien Rojer (quarterfinals)
5. (Croatia) Ivan Dodig / (Brazil) Marcelo Melo (champions)
6. (India) Rohan Bopanna / (France) Édouard Roger-Vasselin (second round)
7. (France) Julien Benneteau / (Serbia) Nenad Zimonjić (second round)
8. (Spain) David Marrero / (Spain) Fernando Verdasco (final)

== Draw ==
=== Key ===
- Q = Qualifier
- WC = Wild card
- LL = Lucky loser
- Alt = Alternate
- SE = Special exempt
- PR = Protected ranking
- ITF = ITF entry
- JE = Junior exempt
- w/o = Walkover
- r = Retired
- d = Defaulted
- SR = Special ranking

=== Finals ===
Semifinals
1	(United States) Bob Bryan (United States) Mike Bryan	7^{7}	5	[7]
5	(Croatia) Ivan Dodig (Brazil) Marcelo Melo	6^{5}	7	[10]
(United Kingdom) Jamie Murray (Australia) John Peers	6^{4}	6^{9}
8	(Spain) David Marrero (Spain) Fernando Verdasco	7^{7}	7^{11}

Final
5	(Croatia) Ivan Dodig (Brazil) Marcelo Melo	7^{7}	6^{6}	[10]
8	(Spain) David Marrero (Spain) Fernando Verdasco	6^{2}	7^{8}	[2]

=== Top half ===
First round
(Argentina) C Berlocq (Argentina) JM del Potro
(Spain) P Andújar (Spain) F López	w/o
(Philippines) T Huey (United Kingdom) D Inglot	6^{4}	7^{7}	[17]
(Belarus) M Mirnyi (Romania) H Tecău	7^{7}	6^{2}	[15]
(Poland) M Fyrstenberg (Poland) M Matkowski	6	7^{8}
Alt	(Germany) A Begemann (Germany) M Emmrich	3	6^{6}
(South Africa) K Anderson (Russia) D Tursunov	2	1
WC	(Switzerland) R Federer (China) Z Zhang	6	6

Second round
1	(United States) B Bryan (United States) M Bryan	6	6
(Spain) P Andújar (Spain) F López	3	2
(Philippines) T Huey (United Kingdom) D Inglot	7^{7}	5	[10]
6	(India) R Bopanna (France) É Roger-Vasselin	6^{4}	7	[6]
4	(Pakistan) A-u-H Qureshi (Netherlands) J-J Rojer	6	3	[10]
(Poland) M Fyrstenberg (Poland) M Matkowski	4	6	[7]
WC	(Switzerland) R Federer (China) Z Zhang	1	6	[8]
5	(Croatia) I Dodig (Brazil) M Melo	6	1	[10]

Quarterfinals
1	(United States) B Bryan (United States) M Bryan	7	7^{7}
(Philippines) T Huey (United Kingdom) D Inglot	5	6^{4}
4	(Pakistan) A-u-H Qureshi (Netherlands) J-J Rojer	6^{4}	3
5	(Croatia) I Dodig (Brazil) M Melo	7^{7}	6

Semifinals
1	(United States) B Bryan (United States) M Bryan	7^{7}	5	[7]
5	(Croatia) I Dodig (Brazil) M Melo	6^{5}	7	[10]

=== Bottom half ===
First round
Alt	(Czech Republic) L Rosol (Australia) B Tomic	5	4
(United Kingdom) J Murray (Australia) J Peers	7	6
(Germany) P Kohlschreiber (Germany) F Mayer	6^{3}	2
(Sweden) R Lindstedt (Canada) V Pospisil	7^{7}	6
WC	(China) M Gong (China) Z Li	3	6	[4]
(Italy) F Fognini (Italy) A Seppi	6	0	[10]
(United Kingdom) C Fleming (United Kingdom) J Marray	3	7	[10]
(Mexico) S González (United States) S Lipsky	6	5	[7]

Second round
7	(France) J Benneteau (Serbia) N Zimonjić	4	2
(United Kingdom) J Murray (Australia) J Peers	6	6
(Sweden) R Lindstedt (Canada) V Pospisil	7	3	[13]
3	(Canada) D Nestor (India) L Paes	5	6	[11]
8	(Spain) D Marrero (Spain) F Verdasco	6	5	[10]
(Italy) F Fognini (Italy) A Seppi	4	7	[7]
(United Kingdom) C Fleming (United Kingdom) J Marray	2	4
2	(Spain) M Granollers (Spain) M López	6	6

Quarterfinals
(United Kingdom) J Murray (Australia) J Peers	3	6	[10]
(Sweden) R Lindstedt (Canada) V Pospisil	6	3	[6]
8	(Spain) D Marrero (Spain) F Verdasco	6	6
2	(Spain) M Granollers (Spain) M López	3	4

Semifinals
(United Kingdom) J Murray (Australia) J Peers	6^{4}	6^{9}
8	(Spain) D Marrero (Spain) F Verdasco	7^{7}	7^{11}
