= Marcelo Melo =

Brazilian tennis player

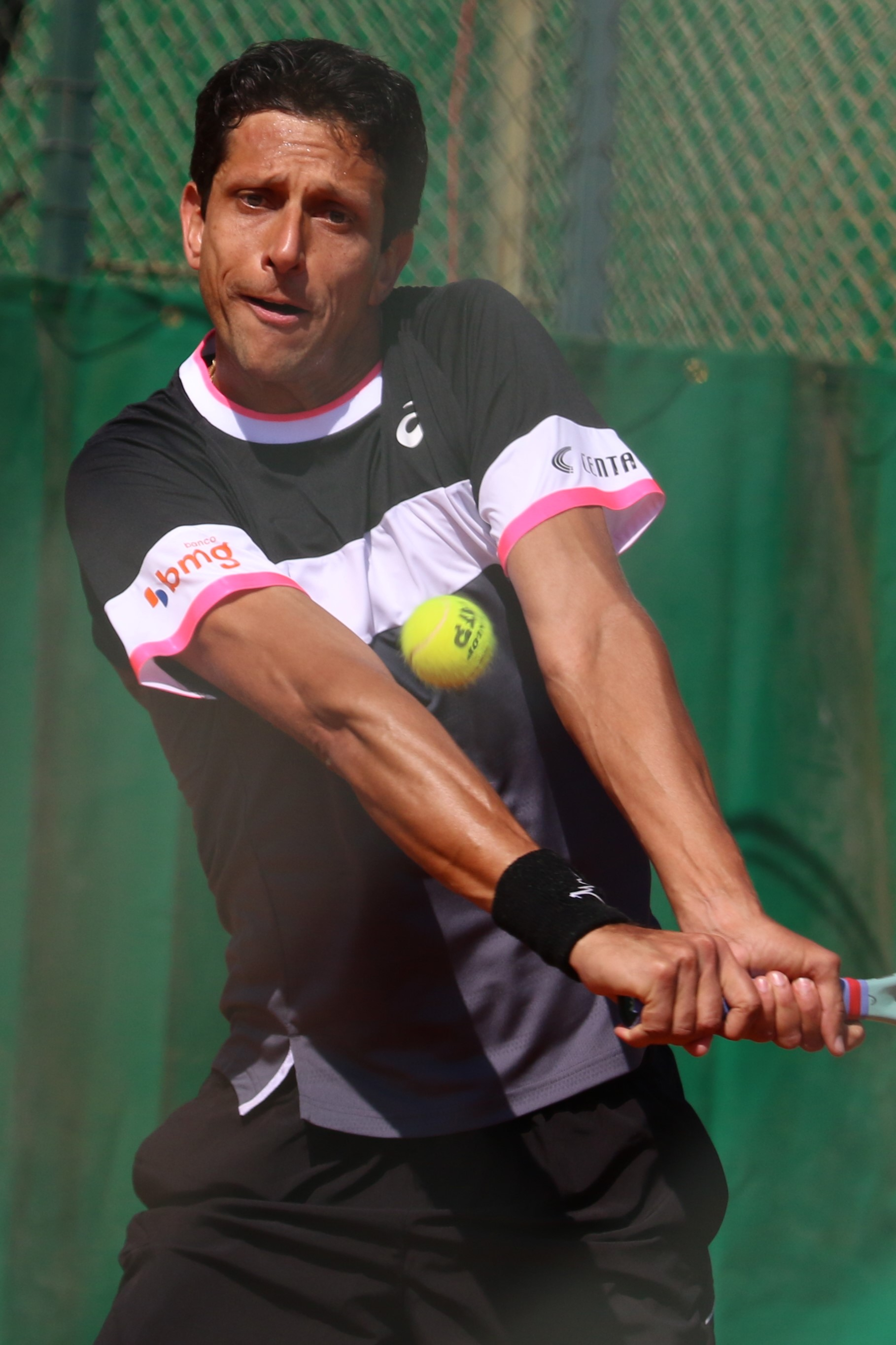
- Melo at the 2023 Monte-Carlo Masters
- Country (sports): Brazil
- Residence: Belo Horizonte, Brazil
- Born: September 23, 1983 (age 43) Belo Horizonte, Brazil
- Height: 2.03 m (6 ft 8 in)
- Turned pro: 1998
- Plays: Right-handed (two-handed backhand)
- Coach: Daniel Melo
- Prize money: US $10,003,628

Singles
- Career record: 1–0
- Career titles: 0
- Highest ranking: No. 273 (21 November 2005)

Doubles
- Career record: 678–480
- Career titles: 42
- Highest ranking: No. 1 (2 November 2015)
- Current ranking: No. 52 (9 November 2026)

Grand Slam doubles results
- Australian Open: SF (2015)
- French Open: W (2015)
- Wimbledon: W (2017)
- US Open: F (2018)

Other doubles tournaments
- Tour Finals: F (2014, 2017)
- Olympic Games: QF (2012, 2016)

Grand Slam mixed doubles results
- Australian Open: SF (2010)
- French Open: F (2009)
- Wimbledon: SF (2010)
- US Open: QF (2013)
- Last updated on: 9 November 2026.

Marcelo Pinheiro Davi de Melo (Portuguese pronunciation: [maʁˈsɛlu ˈmɛlu]; born September 23, 1983) is a Brazilian professional tennis player who specializes in doubles. He is a former world No. 1, which he achieved on 2 November 2015. Melo is the only Brazilian player who has reached number one in the ATP doubles rankings.

Melo is a two-time Grand Slam champion in doubles, having won the 2015 French Open alongside Ivan Dodig and the 2017 Wimbledon Championships with Łukasz Kubot. Melo was also the first Brazilian man ever to win a Grand Slam doubles title. He has won 42 doubles titles on the ATP Tour, including nine at Masters 1000 level. He reached the final at the 2013 Wimbledon Championships and 2018 US Open in men's doubles, as well as at the 2009 French Open in mixed doubles. Melo also finished runner-up in doubles at the ATP Finals in 2014 and 2017.

Melo has represented Brazil in the Davis Cup since 2008, often playing doubles alongside André Sá or Bruno Soares, and has also competed at three editions of the Summer Olympic Games.

== Career ==
=== 2007 ===
After playing with different Brazilian partners in doubles, including André Sá, Melo went through a relatively successful period of his career, reaching the semifinals of Wimbledon doubles, with some matches lasting four hours. Melo and Sá reached the quarterfinals of the US Open. Also in 2007 they won the tournament title of ATP 250 Estoril. Melo won the Buenos Aires Challenger without André Sá, who also was not in Adelaide triumph, the first week of 2008 when Melo played with the Argentine Martín García.

=== 2008 ===
In 2008, Melo partnered with André Sá and had a good campaign, winning three ATPs together—Costa do Sauípe, Poertschach and New Haven. They came to play in the Masters Cup, in which the top eight doubles in the world compete, but they ended the year ranked No. 9 in the Champions Race; this was because Melo was injured in Wimbledon and took time to recover, and Melo and Sá had not made any major campaign in the Masters Series and Grand Slams. Melo and Sá later went on to play as reserves in the Masters Cup. They also participated in the 2008 Beijing Olympics.

=== 2009 ===
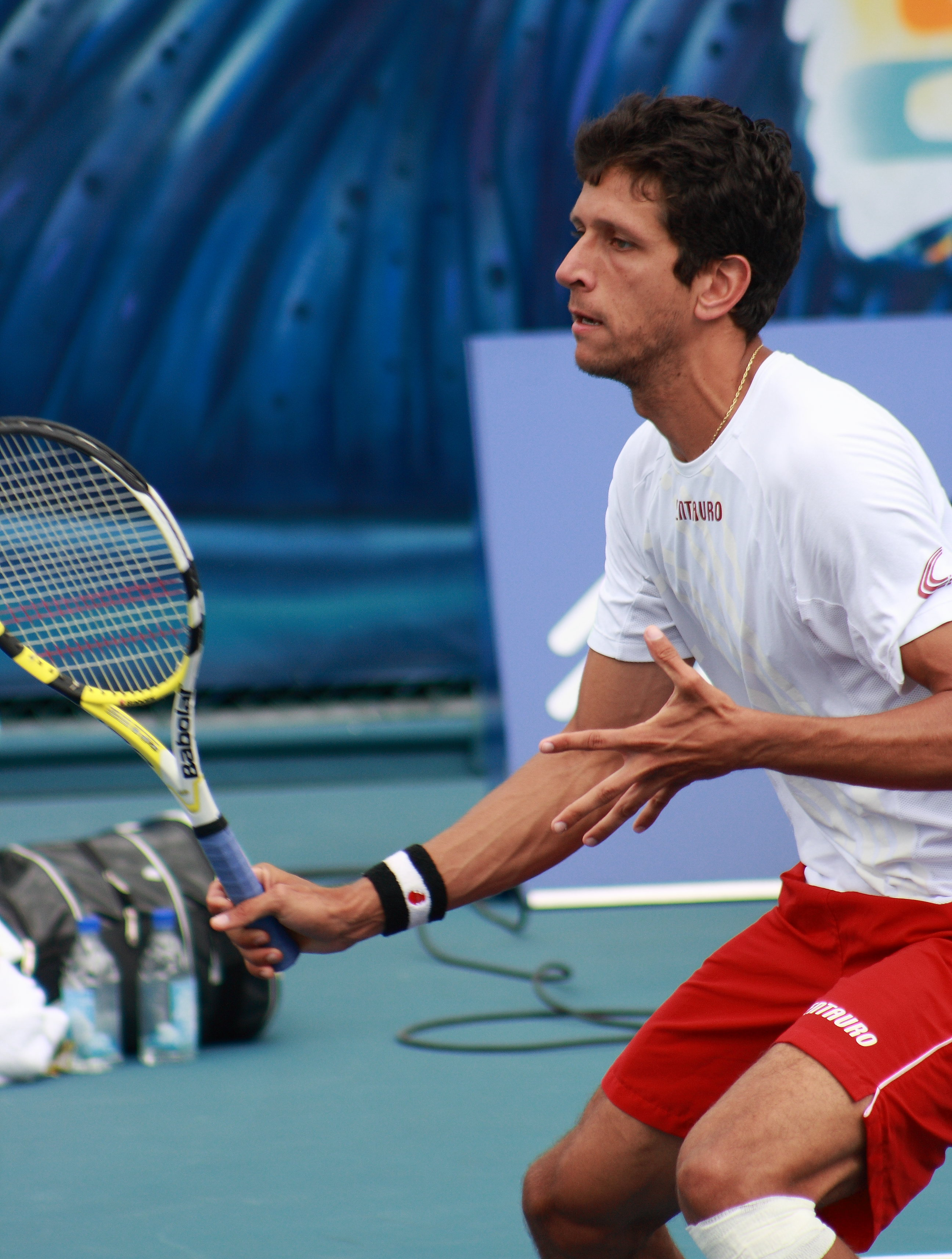
Marcelo Melo at Delray Beach 2009

In 2009, Melo and Sá won one ATP and reached the final of two other competitions. At Roland Garros, Melo reached the final of the Mixed Doubles with American player Vania King, losing the final by two sets to one. This was the first time since 2001 that a Brazilian reached the final of a Grand Slam. In ATP 500 Hamburg, a tournament that had once been a Masters Series, Melo and his partner, the Slovak Filip Polášek, finished as the runners-up. At the end of the year, Melo announced the end of his partnership with André Sá and his new partnership with Bruno Soares.

=== 2010 ===
In 2010, Melo and Soares reached the final of the ATP 250 Auckland at the beginning of the year. After that, they did not play well until May, when Melo won the title of the ATP 250 Nice. At Roland Garros, they defeated the brothers Bob Bryan and Mike Bryan—, the world's top doubles players—, and reached the quarterfinal. They subsequently reached the semifinals of the ATP 500 Hamburg, the final of the ATP 250 Gstaad, the third round of the US Open, the final of the ATP 250 Metz, and the semifinals of the ATP 500 Tokyo and ATP 250 Stockholm.

=== 2011 ===
In 2011, Melo and Soares won two consecutive titles in the ATP 250 Chile and Brazil and were runners-up in the ATP 500 Acapulco. They reached the semifinals of the ATP 250 Nice and Eastbourne, and Melo reached the Newport semifinal with André Sá. In August, Melo and Soares competed in the semifinals of the ATP 500 Washington. In September, playing with Lukáš Dlouhý, Melo reached the final of the ATP 250 Metz. In October, with Soares, he reached the semifinals of the ATP 500 Valencia and the Japan Open Tennis Championships, and later the final of the ATP 250 Stockholm. In November, Melo and Soares reached the quarterfinals of the Masters 1000 Paris. At the end of the year, Marcelo Melo and Bruno Soares ended their partnership.

=== 2012 ===
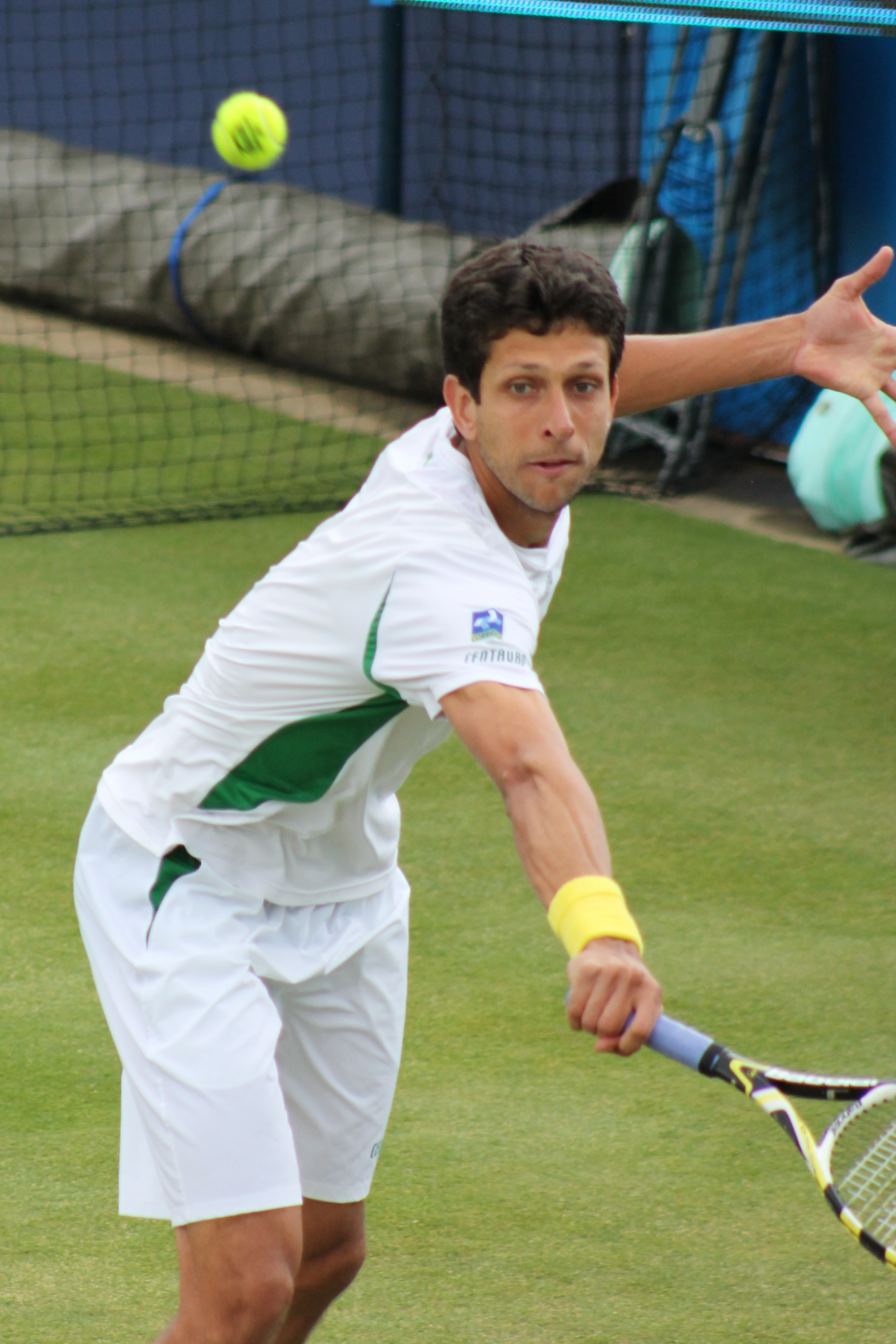
Marcelo Melo playing at grass

In 2012, playing with Ivan Dodig, Melo was the runner-up at ATP 500 Memphis and reached the quarterfinals of Roland Garros and Wimbledon. He was also a quarterfinalist at the Masters 1000 Madrid with Marin Čilić. Melo participated in the 2012 Summer Olympics with Bruno Soares; they reached the quarterfinals after defeating the duo Berdych and Stepanek by 24–22 in the last set.

In the second half of 2012, Melo was a semifinalist in the Masters 1000 Cincinnati and reached the third round of the US Open playing with Dodig. In October, partnered with Cilic, Melo was a semifinalist in the Masters 1000 Shanghai. With this, Melo reached the best rank in his career for the second time, reaching the 18th position worldwide. Playing with Soares, Melo won his 10th ATP doubles title in the ATP 250 Stockholm, reaching the 17th position worldwide. In the Masters 1000 Paris, Melo reached the semifinals, partnered with Cilic.

=== 2013: Wimbledon finalist, top 5 debut ===
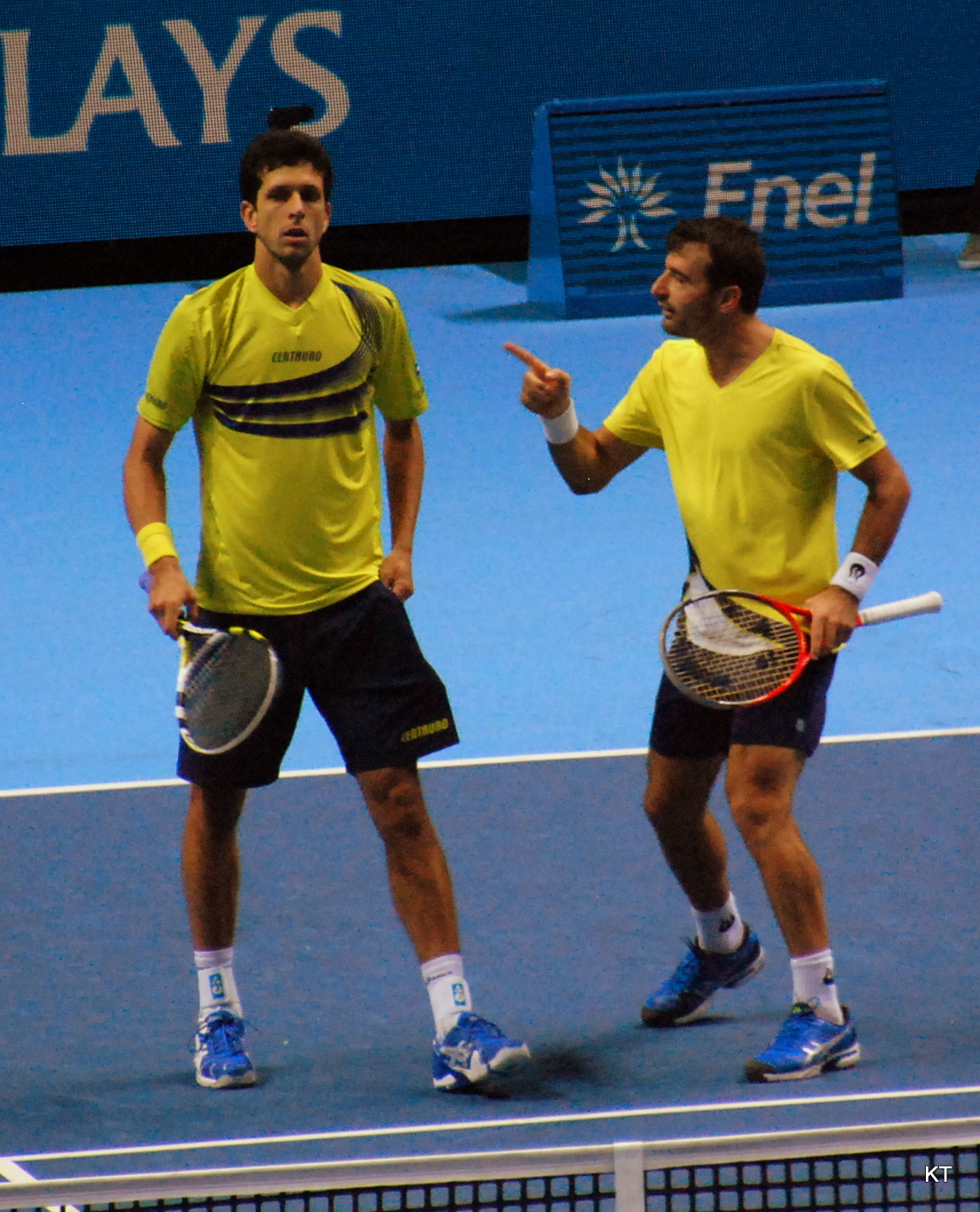
Marcelo Melo and Ivan Dodig

In 2013, Melo won the ATP 250 Brisbane in preparation for the Australian Open, along with Tommy Robredo; this was his 11th ATP title. In February, Melo defeated the Bryan brothers in the US and partnered with Bruno Soares in the Davis Cup. In March, Melo reached the quarterfinals of the Masters 1000 Indian Wells with Dodig, and in May, he reached the third round of Roland Garros.

At the 2023 Wimbledon Championships, Melo performed the best campaign of his career, reaching the final of the tournament. With this, Melo attained his best career ranking, at world No. 14.

In the 2013 US Open, he reached the semifinals for the first time in his career and again broke his personal record, reaching 11th position. Melo won his first Masters 1000 title in October; playing with Dodig, they won Masters 1000 Shanghai, defeating Roger Federer and also the Bryan brothers. Melo became for the first time a world top 10 player, reaching the 8th position of the ATP rankings. He also reached the semifinals of the Masters 1000 Paris, first reaching the world doubles top 5.

=== 2014: ATP Finals runner-up and four more finals ===
In 2014, Melo's best results were the semifinal of the US Open, the final of the ATP World Finals, the final of the Masters 1000 Monte Carlo and Canada, the final of the ATP 500 in Rio and Tokyo, and the title of the ATP 250 Auckland. Remained in the top 10 world doubles throughout the year.

=== 2015: First Grand Slam title and World No. 1 ===
In 2015, Melo had a great first half of the year by reaching the semifinals of the Australian Open for the first time. Melo won the Acapulco tournament and reached the semifinals of the first three Masters 1000 of the year: Indian Wells, Miami, and Monte Carlo. In June, he won his maiden doubles Grand Slam of his career, winning Roland Garros alongside Ivan Dodig by defeating The Bryan brothers in the final. At Wimbledon, Melo reached the quarterfinals.

In Cincinnati, Melo reached his fourth Masters 1000 level semifinal of the year. In October, Melo won back-to-back-to-back tournaments, first in Tokyo, followed by the Shanghai Masters (with Raven Klaasen). In Vienna, playing alongside Łukasz Kubot, Melo guaranteed his place at the top of the ATP doubles ranking by advancing to the semifinal. Melo and Kubot went on to win the tournament.

=== 2016: Two Masters titles ===
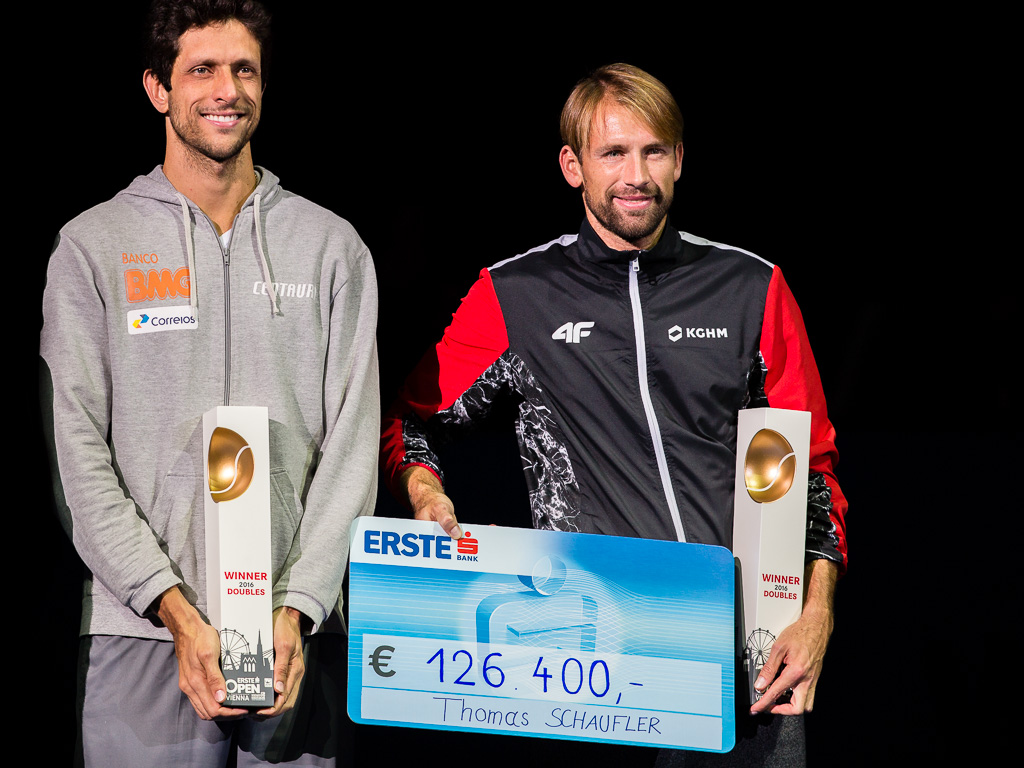
Łukasz Kubot and Marcelo Melo, 2016 Vienna Open Champions

After 22 weeks in ATP No. 1 doubles ranking, Melo was surpassed by Jamie Murray on April 4. Melo returned to ATP No. 1 doubles ranking on May 9 and he stayed until on June 6, 2016. Melo alongside Ivan Dodig won two Masters 1000 doubles tournaments (Toronto and Cincinnati).

In October, Melo partnered with Łukasz Kubot and defeated Oliver Marach and Fabrice Martin to win the Vienna Open doubles title.

=== 2017: Wimbledon men's doubles champion ===
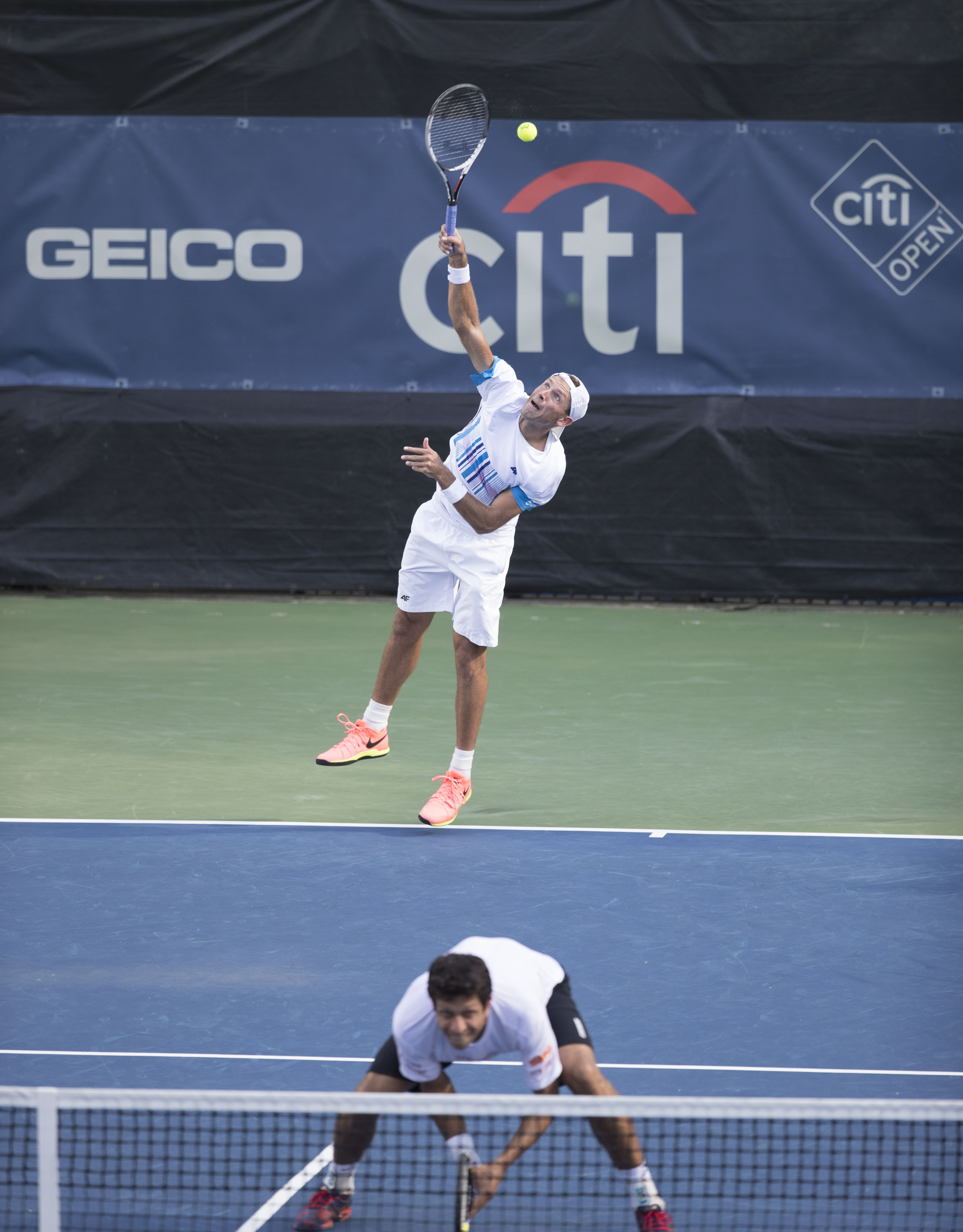
Marcelo Melo with Łukasz Kubot at the Citi Open in 2017

In March, Melo, with his doubles partner Łukasz Kubot, reached the doubles final at Indian Wells Masters. Eighth-seeded Melo and Kubot reached the BNP Paribas Open semi-finals after breezing past tricky wild card duo Nick Kyrgios and Nenad Zimonjić. The Brazilian-Polish pair then defeated fourth seeds Jamie Murray and Bruno Soares to reach the final against the sixth seeds, South Africa's Raven Klaasen and his American doubles partner, Rajeev Ram. At the 2017 Miami Open Melo and Kubot dropped only three sets en route to the final, defeating Marcus Daniell & Marcelo Demoliner, Jean-Julien Rojer & Horia Tecău, Jamie Murray & Bruno Soares in QF and Daniel Nestor & Brian Baker in SF to reach their second straight ATP Masters 1000 final. In the final the sixth-seeded Melo & Kubot defeated American duo Nick Monroe and Jack Sock in straight sets. They made it all the way together at an ATP event for the first time this season. It was their first ever Masters 1000 title won as a team as well.

At Wimbledon, coming from back-to-back grass-court titles at ‘s-Hertogenbosch and Halle, no. 4 seeds Melo and Kubot faced four five-set matches to claim the men's doubles crown (Melo's second major title), defeating No. 16 seeds Oliver Marach and Mate Pavić in a final which took 4 hours 39 minutes and five sets to complete.

In the second half of 2017, he lost the No. 1 position to Kontinen/Peers, but Melo/Kubot kept chasing the top, being finalists at ATP 500 Washington and Masters 1000 Shanghai in addition to the semifinal at Masters 1000 Cincinnati. In November, in the last Masters 1000 of the year, Paris, Kontinen/Peers needed to defend the title but lost in the quarterfinals, while Melo/Kubot, who did not defend anything, won the title. With that, Melo retook the world's No. 1, and Kubot reached the position of No. 2 for the first time.

=== 2018: US Open runner-up ===
Melo remained the world's No. 1 until April. Finished the year keeping in the top 10. His best campaigns of the year were the title of the Shanghai Masters 1000 (the third of his career at this tournament) and the runner-up at the US Open (his best-ever campaign in the American Grand Slam).

=== 2019: Two Masters 1000 finals & one ATP 250 title ===
In 2019, Melo spent the year collecting finals and semifinals, which kept him in the top 10. His best campaigns were the runner-up of the Indian Wells and Shanghai Masters 1000 and the Vienna, Beijing, and Halle ATP 500. He won the 2019 Winston-Salem Open title in August.

Melo and partner Kubot were the second team to qualify for the 2019 Nitto ATP Finals. They qualified for the semifinals with a 2–1 record in the round-robin stage. In the semifinal they were defeated by eventual champions Pierre-Hugues Herbert and Nicolas Mahut, 6–3, 7–6.

=== 2020: 35th ATP title ===
In 2020, Melo continued his partnership in doubles with Łukasz Kubot. The pair won the 2020 Abierto Mexicano Telcel and the 2020 Erste Bank Open. They also reached the finals at 2020 Bett1Hulks Indoors, where they lost to the French pair, Pierre-Hugues Herbert and Nicolas Mahut. They qualified for the 2020 ATP Finals. They did not make it out of the round-robin stage with a 1–2 record.

=== 2021: New partnerships, reunion with Kubot ===
In 2021 he played first with Horia Tecau. They reached Australian Open 3rd round. After, he began a partnership with Jean-Julien Rojer. They did not reach very good results until May, with Doha and Madrid's second rounds as the best results. In Doha, he returned to play a single match after eight years. He lost in the qualifying first round against Tim Pütz (6–3, 6–2). He also played with Mischa Zverev in Munich (first-round loss) and with Marin Cilic in Rome Masters (first-round loss).

In Roland Garros, Melo and Kubot decided to return to play together.

=== 2022: 70th final, tenth ATP 500 title ===
At the 2022 Rakuten Japan Open Tennis Championships, he won his 10th ATP 500 title and 36th overall partnering Mackenzie McDonald after defeating third seeds Rafael Matos and David Vega Hernández. It was also his 70th ATP final overall.

=== 2023: 600th career win and 1000 matches played ===
In 2023, Melo was runner-up at the ATP 500 in Rio and was three-time champion of the ATP 500 in Halle.

He reached 600 career wins at the 2023 French Open partnering John Peers past William Blumberg/Miomir Kecmanovic.

Also partnering with Peers at the 2023 Atlanta Open, he played his 1000th tour-level match with a victory over Luis David Martinez and Reese Stalder owning a 608–392 record. He became the only active player to reach the milestone and the 14th on record, joining an elite group led by Daniel Nestor (1,550), Mike Bryan (1,523) and Bob Bryan (1,468). At the tournament the pair Melo/Peers went on to reach the semifinals where they lost to Jordan Thompson and Max Purcell.

=== 2024: First Masters final in five years ===
At the 2024 Monte-Carlo Masters he reached the final with Alexander Zverev as an alternate pair. It was his first Masters final since 2019 and second in Monte-Carlo in 10 years (since 2014).

He was also champion of the ATP 250 Stuttgart and runner-up of the ATP 500 Washington, in both, together with Rafael Matos.

=== 2025: 39th title and oldest champion in Rio ===
Melo won his 39th title with Rafael Matos finally triumphing with the title at his home tournament, the 2025 Rio Open on his eleventh attempt, having been a finalist in two previous editions. At 41 years of age Melo was the oldest champion in event history. Melo with 39–38 win-loss record in tour-level doubles finals, moved into a tie with Mate Pavic for most titles among active players.

== Personal life ==
Melo's best friend on tour is Alexander Zverev. They first met at the 2015 Rotterdam Open.

Melo's older brother, Daniel, is himself a former tennis player who retired in 2006.

== Performance timelines ==
Key
W	F	SF	QF	#R	RR	Q#	P#	DNQ	A	Z#	PO	G	S	B	NMS	NTI	P	NH

(W) winner; (F) finalist; (SF) semifinalist; (QF) quarterfinalist; (#R) rounds 4, 3, 2, 1; (RR) round-robin stage; (Q#) qualification round; (P#) preliminary round; (DNQ) did not qualify; (A) absent; (Z#) Davis/Fed Cup Zonal Group (with number indication) or (PO) play-off; (G) gold, (S) silver or (B) bronze Olympic/Paralympic medal; (NMS) not a Masters tournament; (NTI) not a Tier I tournament; (P) postponed; (NH) not held; (SR) strike rate (events won / competed); (W–L) win–loss record.
To avoid confusion and double counting, these charts are updated at the conclusion of a tournament or when the player's participation has ended.

=== Doubles ===
Current through the 2026 Mexican Open.

Tournament	2003	2004	2005	2006	2007	2008	2009	2010	2011	2012	2013	2014	2015	2016	2017	2018	2019	2020	2021	2022	2023	2024	2025	SR	W–L
Grand Slam tournaments
Australian Open	A	A	A	A	A	1R	2R	1R	1R	1R	1R	3R	SF	3R	3R	QF	A	2R	3R	2R	A	1R	1R	0 / 16	18–16
French Open	A	A	A	A	2R	2R	1R	QF	2R	QF	3R	3R	W	SF	2R	3R	3R	2R	1R	2R	3R	2R	1R	1 / 19	33–18
Wimbledon	A	A	A	A	SF	3R	2R	2R	2R	QF	F	QF	QF	3R	W	2R	QF	NH	QF	2R	3R	3R	QF	1/18	45–16
US Open	A	A	A	A	QF	3R	2R	3R	2R	3R	SF	SF	1R	1R	2R	F	3R	1R	1R	2R	1R	2R	2R	0/19	30–19
Win–loss	0–0	0–0	0–0	0–0	8–3	5–3	3–4	6–4	3–4	8–4	11–4	11–4	13–3	8–4	10–3	11–4	7–3	2–3	4–4	4–4	4–3	4–4	4–4	2 / 72	126–69
Year-end championships
ATP Finals	did not qualify										SF	F	SF	RR	F	RR	SF	RR	did not qualify					0 / 8	16–15
National representation
Summer Olympics	NH	A	not held			2R	not held			QF	not held			QF	not held				1R	not held		A	NH	0 / 4	5–4
Davis Cup	A	A	A	A	A	PO	PO	PO	PO	PO	1R	PO	1R	PO	PO	Z1	QR	A		A	A	PO		0 / 3	18–5
ATP Tour Masters 1000
Indian Wells Masters	A	A	A	A	A	1R	2R	1R	1R	A	QF	QF	SF	1R	F	1R	F	NH	SF	1R	1R	2R	1R	0/16	20–16
Miami Open	A	A	A	A	A	2R	1R	1R	1R	2R	2R	2R	SF	2R	W	1R	SF	NH	1R	2R	2R	QF	1R	1/17	20–16
Monte-Carlo Masters	A	A	A	A	A	2R	1R	A	A	2R	1R	F	SF	SF	QF	2R	QF	NH	1R	QF	1R	F	1R	0/15	18–14
Madrid Open	A	A	A	A	A	2R	2R	A	2R	QF	1R	1R	2R	SF	W	QF	QF	NH	2R	1R	2R	1R	1R	1/16	14–15
Italian Open	A	A	A	A	A	1R	2R	A	A	A	A	QF	QF	2R	QF	QF	SF	1R	1R	1R	1R	2R	1R	0/14	9–14
Canadian Open	A	A	A	A	A	A	2R	1R	A	2R	QF	F	2R	W	2R	2R	1R	NH	2R	1R	1R	A	1R	1/14	10–13
Cincinnati Masters	A	A	A	A	A	A	2R	1R	A	SF	1R	2R	SF	W	SF	QF	QF	2R	1R	1R	QF	2R	2R	1/16	20–15
Shanghai Masters	not held						A	A	A	SF	W	QF	W	2R	F	W	F	not held			1R	1R	1R	3/11	23–8
Paris Masters	A	A	A	A	A	QF	1R	1R	QF	SF	SF	2R	W	SF	W	QF	1R	SF	2R	A	1R	2R	1R	2 / 17	22–15
German Open	A	A	A	A	A	2R	not Masters series																	0 / 1	1–1
Win–loss	0–0	0–0	0–0	0–0	0–0	6–7	4–8	0–5	3–4	14–7	9–7	11–9	19–7	15–7	22–6	8–8	20–9	3–3	5–8	3–6	4–9	10–8	1–9	9 / 137	157–127
Career statistics
	2003	2004	2005	2006	2007	2008	2009	2010	2011	2012	2013	2014	2015	2016	2017	2018	2019	2020	2021	2022	2023	2024	2025	Career	
Titles	0	0	0	0	1	4	1	1	2	1	2	1	6	3	6	4	1	2	0	1	1	1	2	40	
Finals	0	0	0	0	1	5	4	4	5	2	3	6	7	4	10	5	6	3	0	5	2	3	3	78	
Overall win-loss	0–0	1–1	0–0	0–0	18–11	42–23	32–30	29–30	38–27	44–27	34–26	44–25	54–17	44–26	52–18	42–22	48–25	21–13	16–26	31–28	22–26	28–25	24–28	664–454	
Year-end ranking	430	186	147	116	34	19	36	39	27	20	6	6	1	8	1	9	7	10	29	39	50	39	54	59%	

=== Mixed doubles ===
Tournament	2007	2008	2009	2010	2011	2012	2013	2014	2015	2016	2017	2018	2019	2020	2021	2022	2023	2024	SR	W–L
Grand Slam tournaments
Australian Open	A	1R	QF	SF	1R	1R	2R	1R	QF	A	A	A	A	1R	2R	A	A	1R	0 / 11	9–11
French Open	A	2R	F	A	QF	A	SF	A	A	A	A	A	A	NH	A	A	A	A	0 / 4	6–4
Wimbledon	2R	1R	2R	SF	1R	2R	3R	A	A	A	A	A	A	NH	A	A	A	A	0 / 7	8–7
US Open	A	2R	1R	A	A	A	QF	A	A	A	A	A	A	NH	1R	A	1R	A	0 / 5	3–5
Win–loss	1–1	2–4	7–4	7–2	2–3	1–2	8–4	0–1	2–1	0–0	0–0	0–0	0–0	0–1	1–2	0–0	0–1	0–1	0 / 27	26–27
National representation
Olympics	NH	A	not held			A	not held			2R	not held				1R	not held		A	0 / 2	1–2

== Grand Slam tournaments finals ==
=== Doubles: 4 (2 titles, 2 runner-ups) ===
Result	Year	Tournament	Surface	Partner	Opponents	Score
Loss	2013	Wimbledon	Grass	(Croatia) Ivan Dodig	(United States) Bob Bryan (United States) Mike Bryan	6–3, 3–6, 4–6, 4–6
Win	2015	French Open	Clay	(Croatia) Ivan Dodig	(United States) Bob Bryan (United States) Mike Bryan	6–7^{(5–7)}, 7–6^{(7–5)}, 7–5
Win	2017	Wimbledon	Grass	(Poland) Łukasz Kubot	(Austria) Oliver Marach (Croatia) Mate Pavić	5–7, 7–5, 7–6^{(7–2)}, 3–6, 13–11
Loss	2018	US Open	Hard	(Poland) Łukasz Kubot	(United States) Mike Bryan (United States) Jack Sock	3–6, 1–6

=== Mixed doubles: 1 (runner-up) ===
Result	Year	Tournament	Surface	Partner	Opponents	Score
Loss	2009	French Open	Clay	(United States) Vania King	(United States) Liezel Huber (United States) Bob Bryan	7–5, 6–7^{(5–7)}, [7–10]

== Other significant finals ==
=== Year-end championships (ATP Finals) ===
==== Doubles: 2 (2 runner-ups) ====
Result	Year	Tournament	Surface	Partner	Opponents	Score
Loss	2014	ATP Finals, UK	Hard (i)	(Croatia) Ivan Dodig	(United States) Bob Bryan (United States) Mike Bryan	7–6^{(7–5)}, 2–6, [7–10]
Loss	2017	ATP Finals, UK	Hard (i)	(Poland) Łukasz Kubot	(Finland) Henri Kontinen (Australia) John Peers	4–6, 2–6

=== ATP 1000 tournaments ===
==== Doubles: 16 (9 titles, 7 runner-ups) ====
Result	Year	Tournament	Surface	Partner	Opponents	Score
Win	2013	Shanghai Masters	Hard	(Croatia) Ivan Dodig	(Spain) David Marrero (Spain) Fernando Verdasco	7–6^{(7–2)}, 6–7^{(6–8)}, [10–2]
Loss	2014	Monte-Carlo Masters	Clay	(Croatia) Ivan Dodig	(United States) Bob Bryan (United States) Mike Bryan	3–6, 6–3, [8–10]
Loss	2014	Canadian Open	Hard	(Croatia) Ivan Dodig	(Austria) Alexander Peya (Brazil) Bruno Soares	4–6, 3–6
Win	2015	Shanghai Masters (2)	Hard	(South Africa) Raven Klaasen	(Italy) Simone Bolelli (Italy) Fabio Fognini	6–3, 6–3
Win	2015	Paris Masters	Hard	(Croatia) Ivan Dodig	(Canada) Vasek Pospisil (United States) Jack Sock	2–6, 6–3, [10–5]
Win	2016	Canadian Open	Hard	(Croatia) Ivan Dodig	(United Kingdom) Jamie Murray (Brazil) Bruno Soares	6–4, 6–4
Win	2016	Cincinnati Masters	Hard	(Croatia) Ivan Dodig	(Netherlands) Jean-Julien Rojer (Romania) Horia Tecău	7–6^{(7–5)}, 6–7^{(5–7)}, [10–5]
Loss	2017	Indian Wells Masters	Hard	(Poland) Łukasz Kubot	(South Africa) Raven Klaasen (United States) Rajeev Ram	7–6^{(7–1)}, 4–6, [8–10]
Win	2017	Miami Open	Hard	(Poland) Łukasz Kubot	(United States) Nicholas Monroe (United States) Jack Sock	7–5, 6–3
Win	2017	Madrid Open	Clay	(Poland) Łukasz Kubot	(France) Nicolas Mahut (France) Édouard Roger-Vasselin	7–5, 6–3
Loss	2017	Shanghai Masters	Hard	(Poland) Łukasz Kubot	(Finland) Henri Kontinen (Australia) John Peers	4–6, 2–6
Win	2017	Paris Masters (2)	Hard (i)	(Poland) Łukasz Kubot	(Croatia) Ivan Dodig (Spain) Marcel Granollers	7–6^{(7–3)}, 3–6, [10–6]
Win	2018	Shanghai Masters (3)	Hard	(Poland) Łukasz Kubot	(United Kingdom) Jamie Murray (Brazil) Bruno Soares	6–4, 6–2
Loss	2019	Indian Wells Masters	Hard	(Poland) Łukasz Kubot	(Croatia) Nikola Mektić (Argentina) Horacio Zeballos	6–4, 4–6, [3–10]
Loss	2019	Shanghai Masters	Hard	(Poland) Łukasz Kubot	(Croatia) Mate Pavić (Brazil) Bruno Soares	4–6, 2–6
Loss	2024	Monte-Carlo Masters	Clay	(Germany) Alexander Zverev	(Belgium) Sander Gillé (Belgium) Joran Vliegen	7–5, 3–6, [5–10]

== ATP Tour finals ==
=== Doubles: 80 (42 titles, 38 runner-ups) ===
Legend Grand Slam (2–2) ATP Finals (0–2) ATP 1000 (9–7) ATP 500 (14–12) ATP 250 (17–15)	Finals by surface Hard (25–23) Clay (11–9) Grass (6–6)	Finals by setting Outdoor (36–30) Indoor (6–8)

Result	W–L	Date	Tournament	Tier	Surface	Partner	Opponents	Score
Win	1–0	Apr 2007	Estoril Open, Portugal	International	Clay	(Brazil) André Sá	(Argentina) Martín García (Argentina) Sebastián Prieto	3–6, 6–2, [10–6]
Win	2–0	Jan 2008	Adelaide International, Australia	International	Hard	(Argentina) Martín García	(Australia) Chris Guccione (Australia) Robert Smeets	6–3, 3–6, [10–7]
Win	3–0	Feb 2008	Brasil Open, Brazil	International	Clay	(Brazil) André Sá	(Spain) Albert Montañés (Spain) Santiago Ventura	4–6, 6–2, [10–7]
Win	4–0	May 2008	Hypo Group International, Austria	International	Clay	(Brazil) André Sá	(Austria) Julian Knowle (Austria) Jürgen Melzer	7–5, 6–7^{(3–7)}, [13–11]
Loss	4–1	Jun 2008	Queen's Club Championships, UK	International	Grass	(Brazil) André Sá	(Canada) Daniel Nestor (Serbia) Nenad Zimonjić	4–6, 6–7^{(3–7)}
Win	5–1	Aug 2008	New Haven Open, US	International	Hard	(Brazil) André Sá	(India) Mahesh Bhupathi (The Bahamas) Mark Knowles	7–5, 6–2
Loss	5–2	Mar 2009	Delray Beach Open, US	250 Series	Hard	(Brazil) André Sá	(United States) Bob Bryan (United States) Mike Bryan	4–6, 4–6
Win	6–2	May 2009	Austrian Open Kitzbühel, Austria	250 Series	Clay	(Brazil) André Sá	(Romania) Andrei Pavel (Romania) Horia Tecău	6–7^{(9–11)}, 6–2, [10–7]
Loss	6–3	Jun 2009	Queen's Club Championships, UK (2)	250 Series	Grass	(Brazil) André Sá	(South Africa) Wesley Moodie (Russia) Mikhail Youzhny	6–4, 4–6, [10–6]
Loss	6–4	Jul 2009	German Open, Germany	500 Series	Clay	(Slovakia) Filip Polášek	(Sweden) Simon Aspelin (Australia) Paul Hanley	6–3, 6–3
Loss	6–5	Jan 2010	Auckland Open, New Zealand	250 Series	Hard	(Brazil) Bruno Soares	(New Zealand) Marcus Daniell (Romania) Horia Tecău	7–5, 6–4
Win	7–5	May 2010	Open de Nice Côte d'Azur, France	250 Series	Clay	(Brazil) Bruno Soares	(India) Rohan Bopanna (Pakistan) Aisam-ul-Haq Qureshi	1–6, 6–3, [10–5]
Loss	7–6	Aug 2010	Swiss Open, Switzerland	250 Series	Clay	(Brazil) Bruno Soares	(Sweden) Johan Brunström (Finland) Jarkko Nieminen	3–6, 7–6^{(7–4)}, [9–11]
Loss	7–7	Sep 2010	Open de Moselle, France	250 Series	Hard (i)	(Brazil) Bruno Soares	(Jamaica) Dustin Brown (Netherlands) Rogier Wassen	3–6, 3–6
Win	8–7	Feb 2011	Chile Open, Chile	250 Series	Clay	(Brazil) Bruno Soares	(Poland) Łukasz Kubot (Austria) Oliver Marach	6–3, 7–6^{(7–3)}
Win	9–7	Feb 2011	Brasil Open, Brazil (2)	250 Series	Clay	(Brazil) Bruno Soares	(Spain) Pablo Andújar (Spain) Daniel Gimeno Traver	7–6^{(7–4)}, 6–3
Loss	9–8	Feb 2011	Mexican Open, Mexico	500 Series	Clay	(Brazil) Bruno Soares	(Romania) Victor Hănescu (Romania) Horia Tecău	1–6, 3–6
Loss	9–9	Sep 2011	Open de Moselle, France	250 Series	Hard (i)	(Czech Republic) Lukáš Dlouhý	(United Kingdom) Jamie Murray (Brazil) André Sá	4–6, 6–7^{(7–9)}
Loss	9–10	Oct 2011	Stockholm Open, Sweden	250 Series	Hard (i)	(Brazil) Bruno Soares	(India) Rohan Bopanna (Pakistan) Aisam-ul-Haq Qureshi	1–6, 3–6
Loss	9–11	Feb 2012	US National Indoor Championships, US	500 Series	Hard (i)	(Croatia) Ivan Dodig	(Belarus) Max Mirnyi (Canada) Daniel Nestor	6–4, 5–7, [7–10]
Win	10–11	Oct 2012	Stockholm Open, Sweden	250 Series	Hard (i)	(Brazil) Bruno Soares	(Sweden) Robert Lindstedt (Serbia) Nenad Zimonjić	6–7^{(4–7)}, 7–5, [10–6]
Win	11–11	Jan 2013	Brisbane International, Australia (2)	250 Series	Hard	(Spain) Tommy Robredo	(United States) Eric Butorac (Australia) Paul Hanley	4–6, 6–1, [10–5]
Loss	11–12	Jul 2013	Wimbledon, UK	Grand Slam	Grass	(Croatia) Ivan Dodig	(United States) Bob Bryan (United States) Mike Bryan	6–3, 3–6, 4–6, 4–6
Win	12–12	Oct 2013	Shanghai Masters, China	Masters 1000	Hard	(Croatia) Ivan Dodig	(Spain) David Marrero (Spain) Fernando Verdasco	7–6^{(7–2)}, 6–7^{(6–8)}, [10–2]
Win	13–12	Jan 2014	Auckland Open, New Zealand	250 Series	Hard	(Austria) Julian Knowle	(Austria) Alexander Peya (Brazil) Bruno Soares	4–6, 6–3, [10–5]
Loss	13–13	Feb 2014	Rio Open, Brazil	500 Series	Clay	(Spain) David Marrero	(Colombia) Juan Sebastián Cabal (Colombia) Robert Farah	4–6, 2–6
Loss	13–14	Apr 2014	Monte-Carlo Masters, Monaco	Masters 1000	Clay	(Croatia) Ivan Dodig	(United States) Bob Bryan (United States) Mike Bryan	3–6, 6–3, [8–10]
Loss	13–15	Aug 2014	Canadian Open, Canada	Masters 1000	Hard	(Croatia) Ivan Dodig	(Austria) Alexander Peya (Brazil) Bruno Soares	4–6, 3–6
Loss	13–16	Oct 2014	Japan Open, Japan	500 Series	Hard	(Croatia) Ivan Dodig	(France) Pierre-Hugues Herbert (Poland) Michał Przysiężny	3–6, 7–6^{(7–3)}, [5–10]
Loss	13–17	Nov 2014	ATP World Tour Finals, UK	Tour Finals	Hard (i)	(Croatia) Ivan Dodig	(United States) Bob Bryan (United States) Mike Bryan	7–6^{(7–5)}, 2–6, [7–10]
Win	14–17	Mar 2015	Mexican Open, Mexico	500 Series	Hard	(Croatia) Ivan Dodig	(Poland) Mariusz Fyrstenberg (Mexico) Santiago González	7–6^{(7–2)}, 5–7, [10–3]
Win	15–17	Jun 2015	French Open, France	Grand Slam	Clay	(Croatia) Ivan Dodig	(United States) Bob Bryan (United States) Mike Bryan	6–7^{(5–7)}, 7–6^{(7–5)}, 7–5
Loss	15–18	Aug 2015	Washington Open, US	500 Series	Hard	(Croatia) Ivan Dodig	(United States) Bob Bryan (United States) Mike Bryan	4–6, 2–6
Win	16–18	Oct 2015	Japan Open, Japan	500 Series	Hard	(South Africa) Raven Klaasen	(Colombia) Juan Sebastián Cabal (Colombia) Robert Farah	7–6^{(7–5)}, 3–6, [10–7]
Win	17–18	Oct 2015	Shanghai Masters, China (2)	Masters 1000	Hard	(South Africa) Raven Klaasen	(Italy) Simone Bolelli (Italy) Fabio Fognini	6–3, 6–3
Win	18–18	Oct 2015	Vienna Open, Austria	500 Series	Hard (i)	(Poland) Łukasz Kubot	(United Kingdom) Jamie Murray (Australia) John Peers	4–6, 7–6^{(7–3)}, [10–6]
Win	19–18	Nov 2015	Paris Masters, France	Masters 1000	Hard (i)	(Croatia) Ivan Dodig	(Canada) Vasek Pospisil (United States) Jack Sock	2–6, 6–3, [10–5]
Loss	19–19	Jun 2016	Nottingham Open, UK	250 Series	Grass	(Croatia) Ivan Dodig	(United Kingdom) Dominic Inglot (Canada) Daniel Nestor	5–7, 6–7^{(4–7)}
Win	20–19	Aug 2016	Canadian Open, Canada	Masters 1000	Hard	(Croatia) Ivan Dodig	(United Kingdom) Jamie Murray (Brazil) Bruno Soares	6–4, 6–4
Win	21–19	Aug 2016	Cincinnati Masters, US	Masters 1000	Hard	(Croatia) Ivan Dodig	(Netherlands) Jean-Julien Rojer (Romania) Horia Tecău	7–6^{(7–5)}, 6–7^{(5–7)}, [10–6]
Win	22–19	Oct 2016	Vienna Open, Austria (2)	500 Series	Hard (i)	(Poland) Łukasz Kubot	(Austria) Oliver Marach (France) Fabrice Martin	4–6, 6–3, [13–11]
Loss	22–20	Mar 2017	Indian Wells Masters, US	Masters 1000	Hard	(Poland) Łukasz Kubot	(South Africa) Raven Klaasen (United States) Rajeev Ram	7–6^{(7–1)}, 4–6, [8–10]
Win	23–20	Apr 2017	Miami Open, US	Masters 1000	Hard	(Poland) Łukasz Kubot	(United States) Nicholas Monroe (United States) Jack Sock	7–5, 6–3
Win	24–20	May 2017	Madrid Open, Spain	Masters 1000	Clay	(Poland) Łukasz Kubot	(France) Nicolas Mahut (France) Édouard Roger-Vasselin	7–5, 6–3
Win	25–20	Jun 2017	Rosmalen Championships, Netherlands	250 Series	Grass	(Poland) Łukasz Kubot	(South Africa) Raven Klaasen (United States) Rajeev Ram	6–3, 6–4
Win	26–20	Jun 2017	Halle Open, Germany	500 Series	Grass	(Poland) Łukasz Kubot	(Germany) Alexander Zverev (Germany) Mischa Zverev	5–7, 6–3, [10–8]
Win	27–20	Jul 2017	Wimbledon, UK	Grand Slam	Grass	(Poland) Łukasz Kubot	(Austria) Oliver Marach (Croatia) Mate Pavić	5–7, 7–5, 7–6^{(7–2)}, 3–6, 13–11
Loss	27–21	Aug 2017	Washington Open, US	500 Series	Hard	(Poland) Łukasz Kubot	(Finland) Henri Kontinen (Australia) John Peers	6–7^{(5–7)}, 4–6
Loss	27–22	Oct 2017	Shanghai Masters, China	Masters 1000	Hard	(Poland) Łukasz Kubot	(Finland) Henri Kontinen (Australia) John Peers	4–6, 2–6
Win	28–22	Nov 2017	Paris Masters, France (2)	Masters 1000	Hard (i)	(Poland) Łukasz Kubot	(Croatia) Ivan Dodig (Spain) Marcel Granollers	7–6^{(7–3)}, 3–6, [10–6]
Loss	28–23	Nov 2017	ATP Finals, UK	Tour Finals	Hard (i)	(Poland) Łukasz Kubot	(Finland) Henri Kontinen (Australia) John Peers	4–6, 2–6
Win	29–23	Jan 2018	Sydney International, Australia	250 Series	Hard	(Poland) Łukasz Kubot	(Germany) Jan-Lennard Struff (Serbia) Viktor Troicki	6–3, 6–4
Win	30–23	Jun 2018	Halle Open, Germany (2)	500 Series	Grass	(Poland) Łukasz Kubot	(Germany) Alexander Zverev (Germany) Mischa Zverev	7–6^{(7–1)}, 6–4
Loss	30–24	Sep 2018	US Open, US	Grand Slam	Hard	(Poland) Łukasz Kubot	(United States) Mike Bryan (United States) Jack Sock	3–6, 1–6
Win	31–24	Oct 2018	China Open, China	500 Series	Hard	(Poland) Łukasz Kubot	(Austria) Oliver Marach (Croatia) Mate Pavić	6–1, 6–4
Win	32–24	Oct 2018	Shanghai Masters, China (3)	Masters 1000	Hard	(Poland) Łukasz Kubot	(United Kingdom) Jamie Murray (Brazil) Bruno Soares	6–4, 6–2
Loss	32–25	Mar 2019	Indian Wells Masters, US	Masters 1000	Hard	(Poland) Łukasz Kubot	(Croatia) Nikola Mektić (Argentina) Horacio Zeballos	6–4, 4–6, [3–10]
Loss	32–26	Jun 2019	Halle Open, Germany	500 Series	Grass	(Poland) Łukasz Kubot	(South Africa) Raven Klaasen (New Zealand) Michael Venus	6–4, 3–6, [4–10]
Win	33–26	Aug 2019	Winston-Salem Open, US	250 Series	Hard	(Poland) Łukasz Kubot	(United States) Nicholas Monroe (United States) Tennys Sandgren	6–7^{(6–8)}, 6–1, [10–3]
Loss	33–27	Oct 2019	China Open, China	500 Series	Hard	(Poland) Łukasz Kubot	(Croatia) Ivan Dodig (Slovakia) Filip Polášek	3–6, 6–7^{(4−7)}
Loss	33–28	Oct 2019	Shanghai Masters, China	Masters 1000	Hard	(Poland) Łukasz Kubot	(Croatia) Mate Pavić (Brazil) Bruno Soares	4–6, 2–6
Loss	33–29	Oct 2019	Vienna Open, Austria	500 Series	Hard (i)	(Poland) Łukasz Kubot	(United States) Rajeev Ram (United Kingdom) Joe Salisbury	4–6, 7–6^{(7–5)}, [5–10]
Win	34–29	Feb 2020	Mexican Open, Mexico (2)	500 Series	Hard	(Poland) Łukasz Kubot	(Colombia) Juan Sebastián Cabal (Colombia) Robert Farah	7–6^{(8–6)}, 6–7^{(4–7)}, [11–9]
Loss	34–30	Oct 2020	Cologne Indoors, Germany	250 Series	Hard (i)	(Poland) Łukasz Kubot	(France) Pierre-Hugues Herbert (France) Nicolas Mahut	4–6, 4–6
Win	35–30	Nov 2020	Vienna Open, Austria (3)	500 Series	Hard (i)	(Poland) Łukasz Kubot	(United Kingdom) Jamie Murray (United Kingdom) Neal Skupski	7–6^{(7–5)}, 7–5
Loss	35–31	Jan 2022	Adelaide International, Australia	250 Series	Hard	(Croatia) Ivan Dodig	(India) Rohan Bopanna (India) Ramkumar Ramanathan	6–7^{(6–8)}, 1–6
Loss	35–32	May 2022	Lyon Open, France	250 Series	Clay	(Argentina) Máximo González	(Croatia) Ivan Dodig (United States) Austin Krajicek	3–6, 4–6
Loss	35–33	Jul 2022	Hall of Fame Open, United States	250 Series	Grass	(South Africa) Raven Klaasen	(United States) William Blumberg (United States) Steve Johnson	4–6, 5–7
Loss	35–34	Aug 2022	Los Cabos Open, Mexico	250 Series	Hard	(South Africa) Raven Klaasen	(United States) William Blumberg (Serbia) Miomir Kecmanović	0–6, 1–6
Win	36–34	Oct 2022	Japan Open, Japan (2)	500 Series	Hard	(United States) Mackenzie McDonald	(Brazil) Rafael Matos (Spain) David Vega Hernández	6–4, 3–6, [10–4]
Loss	36–35	Feb 2023	Rio Open, Brazil	500 Series	Clay	(Colombia) Juan Sebastián Cabal	(Argentina) Máximo González (Argentina) Andrés Molteni	1–6, 6–7^{(3–7)}
Win	37–35	Jun 2023	Halle Open, Germany (3)	500 Series	Grass	(Australia) John Peers	(Italy) Simone Bolelli (Italy) Andrea Vavassori	7–6^{(7–3)}, 3–6, [10–6]
Loss	37–36	Apr 2024	Monte-Carlo Masters, Monaco	Masters 1000	Clay	(Germany) Alexander Zverev	(Belgium) Sander Gillé (Belgium) Joran Vliegen	7–5, 3–6, [5–10]
Win	38–36	Jun 2024	Stuttgart Open, Germany	250 Series	Grass	(Brazil) Rafael Matos	(United States) Robert Galloway (United Kingdom) Julian Cash	3–6, 6–3, [10–8]
Loss	38–37	Aug 2024	Washington Open, US	500 Series	Hard	(Brazil) Rafael Matos	(United States) Nathaniel Lammons (United States) Jackson Withrow	5–7, 3–6
Loss	38–38	Feb 2025	Argentina Open, Argentina	250 Series	Clay	(Brazil) Rafael Matos	(Argentina) Guido Andreozzi (France) Théo Arribagé	5–7, 6–4, [7–10]
Win	39–38	Feb 2025	Rio Open, Brazil	500 Series	Clay	(Brazil) Rafael Matos	(Spain) Jaume Munar (Spain) Pedro Martínez	6–2, 7–5
Win	40–38	Aug 2025	Winston-Salem Open, US (2)	250 Series	Hard	(Brazil) Rafael Matos	(Portugal) Francisco Cabral (Austria) Lucas Miedler	4–6, 6–4, [10–8]
Win	41–38	Feb 2026	Rio Open, Brazil (2)	500 Series	Clay	(Brazil) João Fonseca	(Germany) Constantin Frantzen (Netherlands) Robin Haase	4–6, 6–3, [10–8]
Win	42–38	Feb 2026	Mexican Open, Mexico (3)	500 Series	Hard	(Germany) Alexander Zverev	(Austria) Alexander Erler (United States) Robert Galloway	6–3, 6–4

Awards
Preceded by (United Kingdom) Jamie Murray & (Brazil) Bruno Soares	ATP Doubles Team of the Year (with (Poland) Łukasz Kubot); 2017	Succeeded by (Austria) Oliver Marach & (Croatia) Mate Pavić
Preceded by (United Kingdom) Jamie Murray & (Brazil) Bruno Soares	ITF Men's Doubles World Champion (with (Poland) Łukasz Kubot); 2017	Succeeded by (United States) Mike Bryan & (United States) Jack Sock
Preceded by Isaquias Queiroz	Brazilian Sportsmen of the Year; 2017	Succeeded by Isaquias Queiroz
