= 2017 Shanghai Rolex Masters – Doubles =

Doubles
- 2017 Shanghai Rolex Masters

Final
- Champions: (Finland) Henri Kontinen (Australia) John Peers
- Runners-up: (Poland) Łukasz Kubot (Brazil) Marcelo Melo
- Score: 6–4, 6–2

Events
Singles	Doubles
← 2016 ·	Shanghai Masters	· 2018 →

John Isner and Jack Sock were the defending champions but withdrew from their first round match.

Henri Kontinen and John Peers won the title, defeating Łukasz Kubot and Marcelo Melo in the final, 6–4, 6–2.

== Seeds ==
All seeds received a bye into the second round.

1. (Finland) Henri Kontinen / (Australia) John Peers (champions)
2. (Poland) Łukasz Kubot / (Brazil) Marcelo Melo (final)
3. (Netherlands) Jean-Julien Rojer / (Romania) Horia Tecău (semifinals)
4. (United Kingdom) Jamie Murray / (Brazil) Bruno Soares (semifinals)
5. (Croatia) Ivan Dodig / (Spain) Marcel Granollers (quarterfinals)
6. (South Africa) Raven Klaasen / (United States) Rajeev Ram (quarterfinals)
7. (Austria) Oliver Marach / (Croatia) Mate Pavić (quarterfinals)
8. (United States) Ryan Harrison / (New Zealand) Michael Venus (second round)

== Draw ==
=== Key ===
- Q = Qualifier
- WC = Wild card
- LL = Lucky loser
- Alt = Alternate
- ITF = ITF entry
- PR = Protected ranking
- SR = Special ranking
- SE = Special exempt
- JE = Junior exempt
- JR = Junior Accelerator Programme entrant
- CO = College Accelerator Programme entrant
- NG = Next Gen Accelerator Program entrant
- w/o = Walkover
- r = Retired
- d = Defaulted

=== Finals ===
Semifinals
1	(Finland) Henri Kontinen (Australia) John Peers	7^{7}	3	[10]
4	(United Kingdom) Jamie Murray (Brazil) Bruno Soares	6^{3}	6	[4]
3	(Netherlands) Jean-Julien Rojer (Romania) Horia Tecău	6	3	[7]
2	(Poland) Łukasz Kubot (Brazil) Marcelo Melo	4	6	[10]

Final
1	(Finland) Henri Kontinen (Australia) John Peers	6	6
2	(Poland) Łukasz Kubot (Brazil) Marcelo Melo	4	2

=== Top half ===
First round
(India) R Bopanna (Uruguay) P Cuevas	6	3	[5]
(Australia) N Kyrgios (France) L Pouille	3	6	[10]
(Poland) M Matkowski (Pakistan) A-u-H Qureshi	6	6
(France) A Mannarino (France) B Paire	4	2
(Argentina) D Schwartzman (Germany) M Zverev	3	4
(South Africa) K Anderson (Serbia) N Zimonjić	6	6
WC	(China) M Gong (China) Ze Zhang	3	4
(Brazil) M Demoliner (Italy) F Fognini	6	6

Second round
1	(Finland) H Kontinen (Australia) J Peers	w/o
(Australia) N Kyrgios (France) L Pouille
(Poland) M Matkowski (Pakistan) A-u-H Qureshi	4	7^{7}	[7]
5	(Croatia) I Dodig (Spain) M Granollers	6	6^{5}	[10]
4	(United Kingdom) J Murray (Brazil) B Soares	7	6
(South Africa) K Anderson (Serbia) N Zimonjić	5	2
(Brazil) M Demoliner (Italy) F Fognini	4	6^{4}
6	(South Africa) R Klaasen (United States) R Ram	6	7^{7}

Quarterfinals
1	(Finland) H Kontinen (Australia) J Peers	2	6	[10]
5	(Croatia) I Dodig (Spain) M Granollers	6	3	[8]
4	(United Kingdom) J Murray (Brazil) B Soares	6	7^{8}
6	(South Africa) R Klaasen (United States) R Ram	1	6^{6}

Semifinals
1	(Finland) H Kontinen (Australia) J Peers	7^{7}	3	[10]
4	(United Kingdom) J Murray (Brazil) B Soares	6^{3}	6	[4]

=== Bottom half ===
First round
WC	(China) D Wu (China) Y Wu	7^{8}	6
(France) F Martin (France) É Roger-Vasselin	6^{6}	3
(Colombia) JS Cabal (Colombia) R Farah	6^{3}	7^{9}	[10]
(Croatia) N Mektić (United States) N Monroe	7^{7}	6^{7}	[8]
(Italy) P Lorenzi (Spain) A Ramos Viñolas	6^{5}	6^{3}
(Mexico) S González (Chile) J Peralta	7^{7}	7^{7}
(United States) J Isner (United States) J Sock
(Spain) F López (Spain) M López	w/o

Second round
7	(Austria) O Marach (Croatia) M Pavić	7^{7}	6
WC	(China) D Wu (China) Y Wu	6^{5}	3
(Colombia) JS Cabal (Colombia) R Farah	6	4	[6]
3	(Netherlands) J-J Rojer (Romania) H Tecău	3	6	[10]
8	(United States) R Harrison (New Zealand) M Venus	4	6^{5}
(Mexico) S González (Chile) J Peralta	6	7^{7}
(Spain) F López (Spain) M López	5	6	[11]
2	(Poland) Ł Kubot (Brazil) M Melo	7	4	[13]

Quarterfinals
7	(Austria) O Marach (Croatia) M Pavić	6^{6}	4
3	(Netherlands) J-J Rojer (Romania) H Tecău	7^{8}	6
(Mexico) S González (Chile) J Peralta	6^{1}	4
2	(Poland) Ł Kubot (Brazil) M Melo	7^{7}	6

Semifinals
3	(Netherlands) J-J Rojer (Romania) H Tecău	6	3	[7]
2	(Poland) Ł Kubot (Brazil) M Melo	4	6	[10]
