= 2017 ATP Finals – Doubles =

Doubles
- 2017 ATP Finals

Final
- Champions: (Finland) Henri Kontinen (Australia) John Peers
- Runners-up: (Poland) Łukasz Kubot (Brazil) Marcelo Melo
- Score: 6–4, 6–2

Events
Singles	Doubles
← 2016 ·	ATP Finals	· 2018 →

Defending champions Henri Kontinen and John Peers successfully defended their title, defeating Łukasz Kubot and Marcelo Melo in the final, 6–4, 6–2 to win the doubles tennis title at the 2017 ATP Finals.

Melo secured the year-end world No. 1 doubles ranking for the second time when he and Kubot won their first round-robin match.

== Seeds ==
1. (Poland) Łukasz Kubot / (Brazil) Marcelo Melo (final)
2. (Finland) Henri Kontinen / (Australia) John Peers (champions)
3. (Netherlands) Jean-Julien Rojer / (Romania) Horia Tecău (round robin)
4. (United Kingdom) Jamie Murray / (Brazil) Bruno Soares (semifinals)
5. (United States) Bob Bryan / (United States) Mike Bryan (round robin)
6. (France) Pierre-Hugues Herbert / (France) Nicolas Mahut (round robin, withdrew)
7. (Croatia) Ivan Dodig / (Spain) Marcel Granollers (round robin, withdrew)
8. (United States) Ryan Harrison / (New Zealand) Michael Venus (semifinals)

== Alternates ==
1. (Austria) Oliver Marach / (Croatia) Mate Pavić (replaced Dodig/Granollers, round robin)
2. (South Africa) Raven Klaasen / (United States) Rajeev Ram (replaced Herbert/Mahut, round robin)

== Draw ==
=== Key ===
- Q = Qualifier
- WC = Wild card
- LL = Lucky loser
- Alt = Alternate
- SE = Special exempt
- PR = Protected ranking
- ITF = ITF entry
- JE = Junior exempt
- w/o = Walkover
- r = Retired
- d = Defaulted
- SR = Special ranking

=== Finals ===
Semifinals
4	(United Kingdom) Jamie Murray (Brazil) Bruno Soares	6^{2}	2
2	(Finland) Henri Kontinen (Australia) John Peers	7^{7}	6
8	(United States) Ryan Harrison (New Zealand) Michael Venus	1	4
1	(Poland) Łukasz Kubot (Brazil) Marcelo Melo	6	6

Final
2	(Finland) Henri Kontinen (Australia) John Peers	6	6
1	(Poland) Łukasz Kubot (Brazil) Marcelo Melo	4	2

=== Woodbridge/Woodforde group ===
		(Poland) Kubot (Brazil) Melo	(United Kingdom) Murray (Brazil) Soares	(United States) Bryan (United States) Bryan	(Croatia) Dodig (Spain) Granollers (Austria) Marach (Croatia) Pavić	RR W–L	Set W–L	Game W–L	Standings
1	(Poland) Łukasz Kubot (Brazil) Marcelo Melo		2–6, 4–6	6–4, 6–3	7–6^{(7–2)}, 6–4 (w/ Dodig/Granollers)	2–1	4–2 (66.7%)	31–29 (51.7%)	2
4	(United Kingdom) Jamie Murray (Brazil) Bruno Soares	6–2, 6–4		5–7, 7–6^{(7–3)}, [8–10]	6–1, 6–1 (w/ Dodig/Granollers)	2–1	5–2 (71.4%)	36–22 (62.1%)	1
5	(United States) Bob Bryan (United States) Mike Bryan	4–6, 3–6	7–5, 6–7^{(3–7)}, [10–8]		4–6, 4–6 (w/ Marach/Pavić)	1–2	2–5 (28.6%)	29–36 (44.6%)	3
7 9	(Croatia) Ivan Dodig (Spain) Marcel Granollers (Austria) Oliver Marach (Croatia) Mate Pavić	6–7^{(2–7)}, 4–6 (w/ Dodig/Granollers)	1–6, 1–6 (w/ Dodig/Granollers)	6–4, 6–4 (w/ Marach/Pavić)		0–2 1–0	0–4 (0%) 2–0 (100%)	12–25 (32.4%) 12–8 (60%)	X 4

Standings are determined by: 1. number of wins; 2. number of matches; 3. in two-players-ties, head-to-head records; 4. in three-players-ties, percentage of sets won, then percentage of games won, then head-to-head records; 5. ATP rankings.

=== Eltingh/Haarhuis group ===
		(Finland) Kontinen (Australia) Peers	(Netherlands) Rojer (Romania) Tecău	(France) Herbert (France) Mahut (South Africa) Klaasen (United States) Ram	(United States) Harrison (New Zealand) Venus	RR W–L	Set W–L	Game W–L	Standings
2	(Finland) Henri Kontinen (Australia) John Peers		7–6^{(7–3)}, 7–6^{(8–6)}	2–6, 6–1, [10–8] (w/ Klaasen/Ram)	4–6, 6–7^{(8–10)}	2–1	4–3 (57.1%)	33–32 (50.8%)	2
3	(Netherlands) Jean-Julien Rojer (Romania) Horia Tecău	6–7^{(3–7)}, 6–7^{(6–8)}		6–1, 6–7^{(7–9)}, [8–10] (w/ Herbert/Mahut)	3–6, 6–7^{(5–7)}	0–3	1–6 (14.3%)	33–36 (47.8%)	3
6 10	(France) Pierre-Hugues Herbert (France) Nicolas Mahut (South Africa) Raven Klaasen (United States) Rajeev Ram	6–2, 1–6, [8–10] (w/ Klaasen/Ram)	1–6, 7–6^{(9–7)}, [10–8] (w/ Herbert/Mahut)		7–6^{(7–4)}, 4–6, [5–10] (w/ Herbert/Mahut)	1–1 0–1	3–3 (50%) 1–2 (33.3%)	20–25 (44.4%) 7–9 (43.8%)	X 4
8	(United States) Ryan Harrison (New Zealand) Michael Venus	6–4, 7–6^{(10–8)}	6–3, 7–6^{(7–5)}	6–7^{(4–7)}, 6–4, [10–5] (w/ Herbert/Mahut)		3–0	6–1 (85.7%)	39–30 (56.5%)	1

Standings are determined by: 1. number of wins; 2. number of matches; 3. in two-players-ties, head-to-head records; 4. in three-players-ties, percentage of sets won, then percentage of games won, then head-to-head records; 5. ATP rankings.
