= Henri Kontinen =

Finnish tennis player (born 1990)

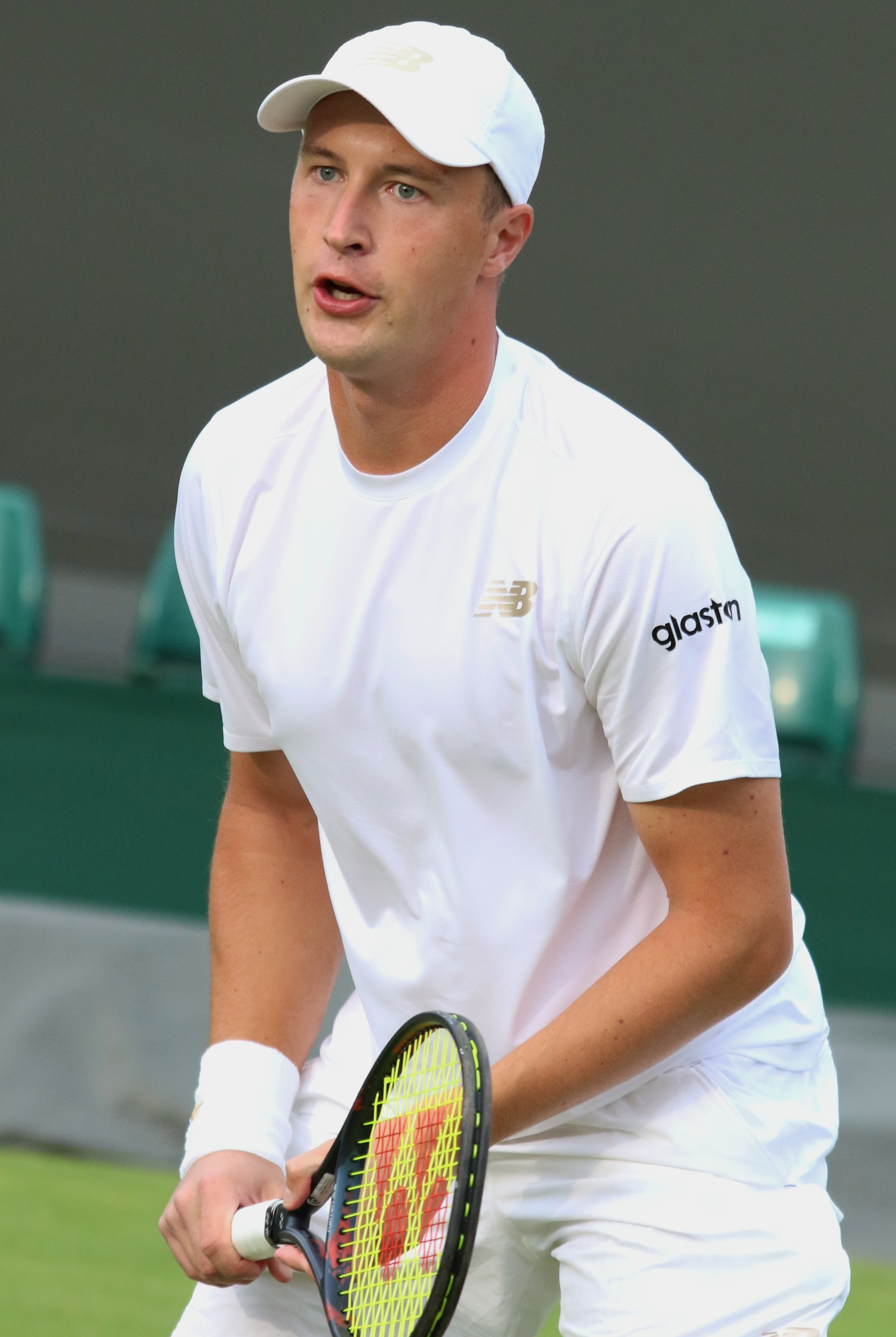
- Kontinen at the 2019 Wimbledon Championships
- Country (sports): Finland
- Residence: Tallinn, Estonia
- Born: 19 June 1990 (age 35) Helsinki, Finland
- Height: 1.91 m (6 ft 3 in)
- Turned pro: 2008
- Retired: 2021
- Plays: Right-handed (one-handed backhand)
- Coach: Chris Eaton
- Prize money: $3,584,065
- Official website: henrikontinen.com

Singles
- Career record: 7–6
- Career titles: 0
- Highest ranking: No. 220 (18 October 2010)

Grand Slam singles results
- Australian Open: Q1 (2010)

Doubles
- Career record: 231–139
- Career titles: 24
- Highest ranking: No. 1 (3 April 2017)

Grand Slam doubles results
- Australian Open: W (2017)
- French Open: QF (2018)
- Wimbledon: SF (2017)
- US Open: SF (2017)

Other doubles tournaments
- Tour Finals: W (2016, 2017)

Mixed doubles
- Career record: 23–15
- Career titles: 1

Grand Slam mixed doubles results
- Australian Open: SF (2020)
- French Open: SF (2015)
- Wimbledon: W (2016)
- US Open: QF (2015, 2019)

Henri Kontinen (Finnish pronunciation: [ˈhenri ˈkontinen]; born 19 June 1990) is a Finnish former professional tennis player who is a former world No. 1 in doubles.

After being forced to end his singles career at a young age due to injuries, having reached a career-high ranking of No. 220, Kontinen became a successful doubles player. He is a two-time Grand Slam champion, having won the 2017 Australian Open with John Peers in men's doubles, and the 2016 Wimbledon Championships in mixed doubles alongside Heather Watson. Kontinen and Peers also won the 2016 and 2017 ATP Finals, and reached the final at the 2019 Australian Open.

He has won 21 doubles titles on the ATP Tour, and became world No. 1 for the first time on 3 April 2017, spending 26 weeks at the top of the rankings. Kontinen and Peers have also won three titles at Masters 1000 level. He has represented Finland in the Davis Cup since 2008, often alongside his younger brother, Micke, who is himself a former tennis player.

== Junior career ==
Kontinen won the 2008 French Open boys' doubles title with Christopher Rungkat. He reached the final of the 2008 Wimbledon boys' singles which he lost to Grigor Dimitrov having beaten Bernard Tomic in the semifinal. He also reached the final of the 2008 US Open boys' doubles with Rungkat. Subsequently, Kontinen's singles development was hampered by knee injuries, and in 2013 he decided to concentrate on doubles.

== Senior career ==
In 2014 Kontinen won his first ATP title at the Bet-at-home Cup Kitzbühel with Jarkko Nieminen, he also played two more finals partnering Marin Draganja.

2015 was a breakthrough year for him as he won five titles including title at the Barcelona Open BancSabadell, his first ATP World Tour 500 series title. Together with Zheng Jie he reached semifinals of mixed doubles at the 2015 French Open.

His good results continued in 2016 as he won the title at the Brisbane International in January with John Peers. On April–May they won the BMW Open together. At the 2016 Wimbledon Championships he reached quarterfinals of the men's doubles tournament together with Peers and the final of the mixed doubles with Heather Watson, which they won in straight sets. On July Kontinen and Peers won the German Open Tennis Championships. On August Kontinen won the Winston-Salem Open playing with Guillermo García-López. It was Kontinen's 10th doubles title in his career. He took the victory of St. Petersburg Open with Dominic Inglot. Kontinen and Peers had a successful end for the year as they won their first Masters title at Paris Masters and the season ending ATP World Tour Finals title. Kontinen reached the top 10 in rankings as the first Finnish tennis player ever to do so.

Kontinen and Peers won the 2017 Australian Open doubles championship in January 2017, and on 3 April 2017 Kontinen became world No. 1 doubles player—the first Finnish player, male or female, to do so. At Wimbledon in 2017, Kontinen and Peers lost in the semifinal to Łukasz Kubot and Marcelo Melo, the eventual champions; Kontinen also lost his No. 1 ranking to Melo. In the mixed doubles, Kontinen and Watson reached the final for the second successive year, but lost to Jamie Murray and Martina Hingis.

== Significant finals ==
=== Grand Slam tournaments ===
==== Doubles: 2 (1 title, 1 runner-up) ====
Result	Year	Championship	Surface	Partner	Opponents	Score
Win	2017	Australian Open	Hard	(Australia) John Peers	(United States) Bob Bryan (United States) Mike Bryan	7–5, 7–5
Loss	2019	Australian Open	Hard	(Australia) John Peers	(France) Pierre-Hugues Herbert (France) Nicolas Mahut	4–6, 6–7^{(1–7)}

==== Mixed doubles: 2 (1 title, 1 runner-up) ====
Result	Year	Championship	Surface	Partner	Opponents	Score
Win	2016	Wimbledon	Grass	(United Kingdom) Heather Watson	(Germany) Anna-Lena Grönefeld (Colombia) Robert Farah	7–6^{(7–5)}, 6–4
Loss	2017	Wimbledon	Grass	(United Kingdom) Heather Watson	(Switzerland) Martina Hingis (United Kingdom) Jamie Murray	4–6, 4–6

=== Year-end championships ===
==== Doubles: 2 (2 titles) ====
Result	Year	Championship	Surface	Partner	Opponents	Score
Win	2016	ATP World Tour Finals, London	Hard (i)	(Australia) John Peers	(South Africa) Raven Klaasen (United States) Rajeev Ram	2–6, 6–1, [10–8]
Win	2017	ATP Finals, London (2)	Hard (i)	(Australia) John Peers	(Poland) Łukasz Kubot (Brazil) Marcelo Melo	6–4, 6–2

=== Masters 1000 ===
==== Doubles: 4 (3 titles, 1 runner-up) ====
Result	Year	Championship	Surface	Partner	Opponents	Score
Loss	2016	Shanghai Masters	Hard	(Australia) John Peers	(United States) John Isner (United States) Jack Sock	4–6, 4–6
Win	2016	Paris Masters	Hard (i)	(Australia) John Peers	(France) Pierre-Hugues Herbert (France) Nicolas Mahut	6–4, 3–6, [10–6]
Win	2017	Shanghai Masters	Hard	(Australia) John Peers	(Poland) Łukasz Kubot (Brazil) Marcelo Melo	6–4, 6–2
Win	2018	Canadian Open	Hard	(Australia) John Peers	(South Africa) Raven Klaasen (New Zealand) Michael Venus	6–2, 6–7^{(7–9)}, [10–6]

== ATP career finals ==
=== Doubles: 30 (24 titles, 6 runner-ups) ===
Legend Grand Slam tournaments (1–1) ATP World Tour Finals (2–0) ATP World Tour Masters 1000 (3–1) ATP World Tour 500 Series (6–2) ATP World Tour 250 Series (12–2)	Finals by surface Hard (19–5) Clay (4–1) Grass (1–0) Carpet (0–0)	Finals by setting Outdoor (13–3) Indoor (11–3)

Result	W–L	Date	Tournament	Tier	Surface	Partner	Opponents	Score
Win	1–0	Aug 2014	Austrian Open Kitzbühel, Austria	250 Series	Clay	(Finland) Jarkko Nieminen	(Italy) Daniele Bracciali (Kazakhstan) Andrey Golubev	6–1, 6–4
Loss	1–1	Sep 2014	Moselle Open, France	250 Series	Hard (i)	(Croatia) Marin Draganja	(Poland) Mariusz Fyrstenberg (Poland) Marcin Matkowski	7–6^{(7–3)}, 3–6, [8–10]
Loss	1–2	Nov 2014	Swiss Indoors, Switzerland	500 Series	Hard (i)	(Croatia) Marin Draganja	(Canada) Vasek Pospisil (Serbia) Nenad Zimonjić	6–7^{(13–15)}, 6–1, [5–10]
Win	2–2	Feb 2015	Zagreb Indoors, Croatia	250 Series	Hard (i)	(Croatia) Marin Draganja	(France) Fabrice Martin (India) Purav Raja	6–4, 6–4
Win	3–2	Feb 2015	Open 13, France	250 Series	Hard (i)	(Croatia) Marin Draganja	(United Kingdom) Colin Fleming (United Kingdom) Jonathan Marray	6–4, 3–6, [10–8]
Win	4–2	Apr 2015	Barcelona Open, Spain	500 Series	Clay	(Croatia) Marin Draganja	(United Kingdom) Jamie Murray (Australia) John Peers	6–3, 6–7^{(6–8)}, [11–9]
Loss	4–3	Aug 2015	Austrian Open Kitzbühel, Austria	250 Series	Clay	(Netherlands) Robin Haase	(Spain) Nicolás Almagro (Argentina) Carlos Berlocq	7–5, 3–6, [9–11]
Win	5–3	Sep 2015	St. Petersburg Open, Russia	250 Series	Hard (i)	(Philippines) Treat Huey	(Austria) Julian Knowle (Austria) Alexander Peya	7–5, 6–3
Win	6–3	Oct 2015	Malaysia Open, Malaysia	250 Series	Hard (i)	(Philippines) Treat Huey	(South Africa) Raven Klaasen (United States) Rajeev Ram	7–6^{(7–4)}, 6–2
Win	7–3	Jan 2016	Brisbane International, Australia	250 Series	Hard	(Australia) John Peers	(Australia) James Duckworth (Australia) Chris Guccione	7–6^{(7–4)}, 6–1
Win	8–3	May 2016	Bavarian International, Germany	250 Series	Clay	(Australia) John Peers	(Colombia) Juan Sebastián Cabal (Colombia) Robert Farah	6–3, 3–6, [10–7]
Win	9–3	Jul 2016	German Open, Germany	500 Series	Clay	(Australia) John Peers	(Canada) Daniel Nestor (Pakistan) Aisam-ul-Haq Qureshi	7–5, 6–3
Win	10–3	Aug 2016	Winston-Salem Open, United States	250 Series	Hard	(Spain) Guillermo García López	(Germany) Andre Begemann (India) Leander Paes	4–6, 7–6^{(8–6)}, [10–8]
Win	11–3	Sep 2016	St. Petersburg Open, Russia (2)	250 Series	Hard (i)	(United Kingdom) Dominic Inglot	(Germany) Andre Begemann (India) Leander Paes	4–6, 6–3, [12–10]
Loss	11–4	Oct 2016	Shanghai Masters, China	Masters 1000	Hard	(Australia) John Peers	(United States) Jack Sock (United States) John Isner	4–6, 4–6
Win	12–4	Nov 2016	Paris Masters, France	Masters 1000	Hard (i)	(Australia) John Peers	(France) Pierre-Hugues Herbert (France) Nicolas Mahut	6–4, 3–6, [10–6]
Win	13–4	Nov 2016	ATP Finals, United Kingdom	Tour Finals	Hard (i)	(Australia) John Peers	(South Africa) Raven Klaasen (United States) Rajeev Ram	2–6, 6–1, [10–8]
Win	14–4	Jan 2017	Australian Open, Australia	Grand Slam	Hard	(Australia) John Peers	(United States) Bob Bryan (United States) Mike Bryan	7–5, 7–5
Win	15–4	Aug 2017	Washington Open, United States	500 Series	Hard	(Australia) John Peers	(Poland) Łukasz Kubot (Brazil) Marcelo Melo	7–6^{(7–5)}, 6–4
Win	16–4	Oct 2017	China Open, China	500 Series	Hard	(Australia) John Peers	(United States) John Isner (United States) Jack Sock	6–3, 3–6, [10–7]
Win	17–4	Oct 2017	Shanghai Masters, China	Masters 1000	Hard	(Australia) John Peers	(Poland) Łukasz Kubot (Brazil) Marcelo Melo	6–4, 6–2
Win	18–4	Nov 2017	ATP Finals, United Kingdom (2)	Tour Finals	Hard (i)	(Australia) John Peers	(Poland) Łukasz Kubot (Brazil) Marcelo Melo	6–4, 6–2
Win	19–4	Jan 2018	Brisbane International, Australia (2)	250 Series	Hard	(Australia) John Peers	(Argentina) Leonardo Mayer (Argentina) Horacio Zeballos	3–6, 6–3, [10–2]
Win	20–4	Jun 2018	Queen's Club Championships, United Kingdom	500 Series	Grass	(Australia) John Peers	(United Kingdom) Jamie Murray (Brazil) Bruno Soares	6–4, 6–3
Win	21–4	Aug 2018	Canadian Open, Canada	Masters 1000	Hard	(Australia) John Peers	(South Africa) Raven Klaasen (New Zealand) Michael Venus	6–2, 6–7^{(7–9)}, [10–6]
Loss	21–5	Jan 2019	Australian Open, Australia	Grand Slam	Hard	(Australia) John Peers	(France) Pierre-Hugues Herbert (France) Nicolas Mahut	4–6, 6–7^{(1–7)}
Win	22–5	Feb 2019	Rotterdam Open, Netherlands	500 Series	Hard (i)	(France) Jérémy Chardy	(Netherlands) Jean-Julien Rojer (Romania) Horia Tecău	7–6^{(7–5)}, 7–6^{(7–4)}
Win	23–5	Oct 2019	Stockholm Open, Sweden	250 Series	Hard (i)	(France) Édouard Roger-Vasselin	(Croatia) Mate Pavić (Brazil) Bruno Soares	6–4, 6–2
Loss	23–6	Feb 2020	Rotterdam Open, Netherlands	500 Series	Hard (i)	(Germany) Jan-Lennard Struff	(France) Pierre-Hugues Herbert (France) Nicolas Mahut	6–7^{(5–7)}, 6–4, [7–10]
Win	24–6	Feb 2021	Open Sud de France, France	250 Series	Hard (i)	(France) Édouard Roger-Vasselin	(Israel) Jonathan Erlich (Belarus) Andrei Vasilevski	6–2, 7–5

== Challengers and Futures finals ==
=== Singles: 6 (5 titles, 1 runner-up) ===
Legend
Challengers
Futures (5–1)

Result	W–L	Date	Tournament	Tier	Surface	Opponent	Score
Win	1–0	Aug 2009	Lithuania F1, Vilnius	Futures	Clay	(Finland) Timo Nieminen	6–1, 6–3
Loss	1–1	Oct 2009	Germany F19, Leimen	Futures	Hard (i)	(Poland) Michał Przysiężny	6–3, 2–6, 5–7
Win	2–1	Oct 2009	Great Britain F16, Cardiff	Futures	Hard (i)	(Belgium) Yannick Mertens	7–6^{(7–4)}, 7–5
Win	3–1	Feb 2010	Bosnia & Herzegovina F2, Sarajevo	Futures	Carpet (i)	(Austria) Alexander Peya	6–3, 7–6^{(7–4)}
Win	4–1	Sep 2010	Sweden F1, Danderyd	Futures	Hard (i)	(Finland) Timo Nieminen	6–3, 6–4
Win	5–1	Sep 2010	Sweden F2, Falun	Futures	Hard (i)	(Finland) Timo Nieminen	6–3, 3–6, 7–6^{(7–5)}

=== Doubles: 28 (18 titles, 10 runner-ups) ===
Legend (doubles)
Challengers (8–8)
Futures (10–2)

Result	W–L	Date	Tournament	Tier	Surface	Partner	Opponents	Score
Loss	0–1	Nov 2007	Helsinki, Finland	Challenger	Hard (i)	(Finland) Harri Heliövaara	(Russia) Mikhail Elgin (Russia) Alexander Kudryavtsev	6–4, 5–7, [11–13]
Win	1–1	Apr 2008	Great Britain F6, Exmouth	Futures	Carpet (i)	(Finland) Harri Heliövaara	(Germany) Ralph Grambow (United Kingdom) Ken Skupski	6–2, 6–2
Loss	1–2	Aug 2008	Tampere, Finland	Challenger	Clay	(Finland) Harri Heliövaara	(Sweden) Ervin Eleskovic (Sweden) Michael Ryderstedt	3–6, 4–6
Win	2–2	Sep 2008	Sweden F2, Falun	Futures	Hard (i)	(Finland) Timo Nieminen	(Sweden) Carl Bergman (Sweden) Tim Göransson	6–4, 6–2
Win	3–2	Mar 2009	Great Britain F3, Tipton	Futures	Hard (i)	(United Kingdom) Dan Evans	(United States) Scott Oudsema (United States) Phillip Simmonds	6–7^{(5–7)}, 7–6^{(7–4)}, [10–4]
Win	4–2	May 2009	Kuwait F1, Mishref	Futures	Hard	(Germany) Sebastian Rieschick	(India) Vivek Shokeen (India) Navdeep Singh	6–4, 6–2
Win	5–2	May 2009	Kuwait F2, Mishref	Futures	Hard	(Germany) Sebastian Rieschick	(Czech Republic) Jiří Krkoška (France) Pierrick Ysern	6–4, 6–4
Win	6–2	Jun 2009	Norway F1, Svingvoll	Futures	Hard	(Finland) Timo Nieminen	(France) Fabrice Martin (United States) Michael McClune	6–3, 6–3
Win	7–2	Jul 2009	Estonia F2, Kuressaare	Futures	Clay (i)	(Finland) Harri Heliövaara	(Estonia) Mait Künnap (Finland) Juho Paukku	6–3, 6–3
Loss	7–3	Nov 2009	Jersey, Channel Islands	Challenger	Hard (i)	(Finland) Jarkko Nieminen	(Denmark) Frederik Nielsen (Australia) Joseph Sirianni	5–7, 6–3, [2–10]
Loss	7–4	Nov 2009	Helsinki, Finland	Challenger	Hard (i)	(Finland) Jarkko Nieminen	(India) Rohan Bopanna (Pakistan) Aisam-ul-Haq Qureshi	2–6, 6–7^{(7–9)}
Loss	7–5	Oct 2010	Great Britain F17, Cardiff	Futures	Hard (i)	(Finland) Timo Nieminen	(United Kingdom) Josh Goodall (United Kingdom) Dominic Inglot	1–6, 2–6
Win	8–5	Nov 2010	Loughborough, United Kingdom	Challenger	Hard (i)	(Denmark) Frederik Nielsen	(Australia) Jordan Kerr (United Kingdom) Ken Skupski	6–2, 6–4
Loss	8–6	Nov 2010	Helsinki, Finland	Challenger	Hard (i)	(Finland) Jarkko Nieminen	(Germany) Dustin Brown (Germany) Martin Emmrich	6–7^{(17–19)}, 6–0, [7–10]
Win	9–6	Jun 2013	Netherlands F1, Amstelveen	Futures	Clay	(Indonesia) Christopher Rungkat	(Netherlands) Niels Lootsma (Netherlands) Jelle Sels	6–1, 7–5
Win	10–6	Jun 2013	Netherlands F2, Alkmaar	Futures	Clay	(Indonesia) Christopher Rungkat	(Czech Republic) David Škoch (Czech Republic) Jan Zednik	7–5, 7–6^{(9–7)}
Win	11–6	Jun 2013	Netherlands F3, Breda	Futures	Clay	(Indonesia) Christopher Rungkat	(United States) Bjorn Fratangelo (United States) Mitchell Krueger	6–4, 7–5
Loss	11–7	Jul 2013	Poznań, Poland	Challenger	Clay	(Poland) Mateusz Kowalczyk	(Germany) Gero Kretschmer (Germany) Alexander Satschko	3–6, 3–6
Win	12–7	Jul 2013	Tampere, Finland	Challenger	Clay	(Serbia) Goran Tošić	(Philippines) Ruben Gonzales (Australia) Chris Letcher	6–4, 6–4
Loss	12–8	Sep 2013	Sweden F6, Falun	Futures	Hard (i)	(Sweden) Jesper Brunström	(Sweden) Milos Sekulic (Sweden) Fred Simonsson	6–3, 3–6, [5–10]
Loss	12–9	Oct 2013	Mouilleron-le-Captif, France	Challenger	Hard (i)	(Spain) Adrián Menéndez-Maceiras	(France) Fabrice Martin (France) Hugo Nys	6–3, 3–6, [8–10]
Win	13–9	Nov 2013	Bratislava, Slovakia	Challenger	Hard (i)	(Sweden) Andreas Siljeström	(Germany) Gero Kretschmer (Germany) Jan-Lennard Struff	7–6^{(8–6)}, 6–2
Win	14–9	Nov 2013	Helsinki, Finland	Challenger	Hard (i)	(Finland) Jarkko Nieminen	(Germany) Dustin Brown (Germany) Philipp Marx	7–5, 5–7, [10–5]
Win	15–9	Jan 2014	Talheim, Germany	Challenger	Hard (i)	(Poland) Tomasz Bednarek	(United Kingdom) Ken Skupski (United Kingdom) Neal Skupski	3–6, 7–6 ^{(7–3)}, [12–10]
Win	16–9	Mar 2014	Cherbourg, France	Challenger	Hard (i)	(Russia) Konstantin Kravchuk	(France) Pierre-Hugues Herbert (France) Albano Olivetti	6–4, 6–7 ^{(3–7)}, [10–7]
Win	17–9	Apr 2014	Sarasota, United States	Challenger	Clay	(Croatia) Marin Draganja	(Spain) Rubén Ramírez Hidalgo (Croatia) Franko Škugor	7–5, 5–7, [10–6]
Loss	17–10	Jul 2014	Poznań, Poland	Challenger	Clay	(Poland) Tomasz Bednarek	(Moldova) Radu Albot (Czech Republic) Adam Pavlásek	7–5, 2–6, [10–8]
Win	18–10	Nov 2014	Helsinki, Finland (2)	Challenger	Hard (i)	(Finland) Jarkko Nieminen	(United Kingdom) Jonathan Marray (Germany) Philipp Petzschner	7–6^{(7–2)}, 6–4

== Junior Grand Slam finals ==
=== Singles: 1 (1 runner-up) ===
Result	Year	Tournament	Surface	Opponent	Score
Loss	2008	Wimbledon	Grass	(Bulgaria) Grigor Dimitrov	5–7, 3–6

=== Doubles: 2 (1 title, 1 runner-up) ===
Result	Year	Tournament	Surface	Partner	Opponents	Score
Win	2008	French Open	Clay	(Indonesia) Christopher Rungkat	(Germany) Jaan-Frederik Brunken (Australia) Matt Reid	6–0, 6–3
Loss	2008	US Open	Hard	(Indonesia) Christopher Rungkat	(Austria) Nikolaus Moser (Germany) Cedrik-Marcel Stebe	6–7^{(5–7)}, 6–3, [8–10]

== Performance timelines ==
Key
W	F	SF	QF	#R	RR	Q#	P#	DNQ	A	Z#	PO	G	S	B	NMS	NTI	P	NH

(W) winner; (F) finalist; (SF) semifinalist; (QF) quarterfinalist; (#R) rounds 4, 3, 2, 1; (RR) round-robin stage; (Q#) qualification round; (P#) preliminary round; (DNQ) did not qualify; (A) absent; (Z#) Davis/Fed Cup Zonal Group (with number indication) or (PO) play-off; (G) gold, (S) silver or (B) bronze Olympic/Paralympic medal; (NMS) not a Masters tournament; (NTI) not a Tier I tournament; (P) postponed; (NH) not held; (SR) strike rate (events won / competed); (W–L) win–loss record.
To avoid confusion and double counting, these charts are updated at the conclusion of a tournament or when the player's participation has ended.

=== Doubles ===
Current after the 2021 Sofia Open.

Tournament	2008	2009	2010	2011	2012	2013	2014	2015	2016	2017	2018	2019	2020	2021	SR	W–L
Grand Slam tournaments
Australian Open	A	A	A	A	A	A	A	1R	2R	W	2R	F	QF	1R	1 / 7	16–6
French Open	A	A	A	A	A	A	2R	2R	2R	1R	QF	3R	1R	1R	0 / 8	8–8
Wimbledon	A	A	A	A	A	A	1R	1R	QF	SF	1R	QF	NH	2R	0 / 7	11–7
US Open	A	A	A	A	A	A	1R	1R	2R	SF	2R	2R	A	1R	0 / 7	7–7
Win–loss	0–0	0–0	0–0	0–0	0–0	0–0	1–3	1–4	6–4	14–3	5–4	11–4	3–2	1–4	1 / 29	42–28
Year-end championship
ATP Finals	Did not qualify								W	W	RR	Did not qualify			2 / 3	9–2
ATP World Tour Masters 1000
Indian Wells Masters	A	A	A	A	A	A	A	1R	1R	QF	1R	2R	NH	A	0 / 5	3–5
Miami Open	A	A	A	A	A	A	A	QF	1R	2R	2R	1R	NH	1R	0 / 6	4–6
Monte-Carlo Masters	A	A	A	A	A	A	A	1R	QF	QF	2R	2R	NH	2R	0 / 6	5–6
Madrid Open	A	A	A	A	A	A	A	1R	QF	QF	2R	2R	NH	1R	0 / 6	4–6
Italian Open	A	A	A	A	A	A	A	1R	1R	SF	QF	QF	2R	1R	0 / 7	5–7
Canadian Open	A	A	A	A	A	A	A	A	QF	QF	W	2R	NH	A	1 / 4	7–3
Cincinnati Masters	A	A	A	A	A	A	A	A	1R	QF	QF	QF	A	A	0 / 4	3–4
Shanghai Masters	NH	A	A	A	A	A	A	A	F	W	2R	2R	NH		1 / 4	8–3
Paris Masters	A	A	A	A	A	A	A	A	W	QF	2R	1R	A	A	1 / 4	6–3
Win–loss	0–0	0–0	0–0	0–0	0–0	0–0	0–0	2–5	14–8	12–8	7–8	8–9	1–1	1–4	3 / 46	45–43
National representation
Davis Cup	Z2	Z2	Z1	Z1	A	Z2	Z2	Z2	Z2	Z2	Z2	Z1	PO	WG1	0 / 0	16–6
Career statistics
Titles–Finals	0–0	0–0	0–0	0–0	0–0	0–0	1–3	5–6	7–8	5–5	3–3	2–3	0–1	1–1	24–30	
Overall win–loss	1–1	2–2	1–2	1–0	0–0	2–1	19–13	31–21	52–20	43–17	22–18	32–21	13–8	12–15	231–139	
Year-end ranking	585	248	280	769	1358	128	46	31	7	3	26	17	33	54	64%	

=== Mixed doubles ===
Current through the 2021 Australian Open.

Tournament	2014	2015	2016	2017	2018	2019	2020	2021	SR	W–L	Win%
Grand Slam tournaments
Australian Open	A	A	A	A	2R	A	SF	1R	0 / 3	4–3	57%
French Open	A	SF	2R	A	1R	A	NH	A	0 / 3	4–3	57%
Wimbledon	1R	2R	W	F	3R	2R	NH	1R	1 / 7	13–6	72%
US Open	A	QF	1R	1R	1R	QF	NH	A	0 / 5	4–5	44%
Win–loss	0–1	5–3	7–2	5–2	2–4	3–2	3–1	0–2	1 / 18	25–17	61%
