= 2016 ATP World Tour Finals – Doubles =

Doubles
- 2016 ATP World Tour Finals

Final
- Champions: (Finland) Henri Kontinen (Australia) John Peers
- Runners-up: (South Africa) Raven Klaasen (United States) Rajeev Ram
- Score: 2–6, 6–1, [10–8]

Events
Singles	Doubles
← 2015 ·	ATP World Tour Finals	· 2017 →

Henri Kontinen and John Peers defeated Raven Klaasen and Rajeev Ram in the final, 2–6, 6–1, [10–8] to win the doubles tennis title at the 2016 ATP World Tour Finals.

Jean-Julien Rojer and Horia Tecău were the reigning champions, but they failed to qualify this year.

== Seeds ==
1. (France) Pierre-Hugues Herbert / (France) Nicolas Mahut (round robin)
2. (United Kingdom) Jamie Murray / (Brazil) Bruno Soares (semifinals)
3. (United States) Bob Bryan / (United States) Mike Bryan (semifinals)
4. (Spain) Feliciano López / (Spain) Marc López (round robin)
5. (Finland) Henri Kontinen / (Australia) John Peers (champions)
6. (Croatia) Ivan Dodig / (Brazil) Marcelo Melo (round robin)
7. (South Africa) Raven Klaasen / (United States) Rajeev Ram (final)
8. (Philippines) Treat Huey / (Belarus) Max Mirnyi (round robin)

== Alternates ==
1. (Colombia) Juan Sebastián Cabal / (Colombia) Robert Farah (Did not play)

== Draw ==
=== Key ===
- Q = Qualifier
- WC = Wild card
- LL = Lucky loser
- Alt = Alternate
- SE = Special exempt
- PR = Protected ranking
- ITF = ITF entry
- JE = Junior exempt
- w/o = Walkover
- r = Retired
- d = Defaulted
- SR = Special ranking

=== Finals ===
Semifinals
5	(Finland) Henri Kontinen (Australia) John Peers	7^{7}	6
3	(United States) Bob Bryan (United States) Mike Bryan	6^{2}	4
2	(United Kingdom) Jamie Murray (Brazil) Bruno Soares	1	4
7	(South Africa) Raven Klaasen (United States) Rajeev Ram	6	6

Final
5	(Finland) Henri Kontinen (Australia) John Peers	2	6	[10]
7	(South Africa) Raven Klaasen (United States) Rajeev Ram	6	1	[8]

=== Group Fleming/McEnroe ===
		(France) Herbert (France) Mahut	(Spain) López (Spain) López	(Finland) Kontinen (Australia) Peers	(South Africa) Klaasen (United States) Ram	RR W–L	Set W–L	Game W–L	Standings
1	(France) Pierre-Hugues Herbert (France) Nicolas Mahut		5–7, 7–5, [8–10]	7–6^{(7–5)}, 4–6, [4–10]	5–7, 4–6	0–3	2–6 (25%)	32–39 (45%)	4
4	(Spain) Feliciano López (Spain) Marc López	7–5, 5–7, [10–8]		3–6, 6–7^{(7–9)}	3–6, 6–7^{(8–10)}	1–2	2–5 (29%)	31–38 (45%)	3
5	(Finland) Henri Kontinen (Australia) John Peers	6–7^{(5–7)}, 6–4, [10–4]	6–3, 7–6^{(9–7)}		6–3, 6–4	3–0	6–1 (86%)	38–27 (58%)	1
7	(South Africa) Raven Klaasen (United States) Rajeev Ram	7–5, 6–4	6–3, 7–6^{(10–8)}	3–6, 4–6		2–1	4–2 (67%)	33–30 (52%)	2

Standings are determined by: 1. number of wins; 2. number of matches; 3. in two-players-ties, head-to-head records; 4. in three-players-ties, percentage of sets won, then percentage of games won, then head-to-head records; 5. ATP rankings.

=== Group Edberg/Jarryd ===
		(United Kingdom) Murray (Brazil) Soares	(United States) Bryan (United States) Bryan	(Croatia) Dodig (Brazil) Melo	(Philippines) Huey (Belarus) Mirnyi	RR W–L	Set W–L	Game W–L	Standings
2	(United Kingdom) Jamie Murray (Brazil) Bruno Soares		6–3, 6–4	6–3, 3–6, [10–6]	6–4, 7–5	3–0	6–1 (86%)	35–25 (58%)	1
3	(United States) Bob Bryan (United States) Mike Bryan	3–6, 4–6		7–6^{(7–3)}, 6–0	6–4, 6–4	2–1	4–2 (67%)	32–26 (55%)	2
6	(Croatia) Ivan Dodig (Brazil) Marcelo Melo	3–6, 6–3, [6–10]	6–7^{(3–7)}, 0–6		7–5, 6–4	1–2	3–4 (43%)	28–32 (47%)	3
8	(Philippines) Treat Huey (Belarus) Max Mirnyi	4–6, 5–7	4–6, 4–6	5–7, 4–6		0–3	0–6 (0%)	26–38 (41%)	4

Standings are determined by: 1. number of wins; 2. number of matches; 3. in two-players-ties, head-to-head records; 4. in three-players-ties, percentage of sets won, then percentage of games won, then head-to-head records; 5. ATP rankings.
