= 2015 Barcelona Open Banc Sabadell – Doubles =

Doubles
- 2015 Barcelona Open Banc Sabadell

Final
- Champions: (Croatia) Marin Draganja (Finland) Henri Kontinen
- Runners-up: (United Kingdom) Jamie Murray (Australia) John Peers
- Score: 6–3, 6–7^{(6–8)}, [11–9]

Events
| Singles | Doubles |
| ← 2014 · | Barcelona Open Banc Sabadell | · 2016 → |

Jesse Huta Galung and Stéphane Robert were the defending champions, but Robert chose not to participate this year. Huta Galung was scheduled to play alongside Pablo Andújar in the qualifying draw, but withdrew with a right calf injury.

Marin Draganja and Henri Kontinen won the title, defeating Jamie Murray and John Peers in the final, 6–3, 6–7^{(6–8)}, [11–9].

== Seeds ==
1. (Poland) Marcin Matkowski / (Serbia) Nenad Zimonjić (first round)
2. (Spain) Marcel Granollers / (Spain) Marc López (quarterfinals)
3. (Canada) Daniel Nestor / (India) Leander Paes (first round)
4. (Austria) Alexander Peya / (Brazil) Bruno Soares (semifinals)

== Draw ==
=== Key ===
- Q = Qualifier
- WC = Wild card
- LL = Lucky loser
- Alt = Alternate
- SE = Special exempt
- PR = Protected ranking
- ITF = ITF entry
- JE = Junior exempt
- w/o = Walkover
- r = Retired
- d = Defaulted
- SR = Special ranking

=== Draw ===
First round
1 | (Poland) M Matkowski (Serbia) N Zimonjić | 4 | 7^{8} | [7]
(Spain) F López (Belarus) M Mirnyi | 6 | 6^{6} | [10]
(United Kingdom) J Murray (Australia) J Peers | 6 | 6^{2} | [10]
(Germany) A Begemann (Austria) J Knowle | 4 | 7^{7} | [7]
3 | (Canada) D Nestor (India) L Paes | 5 | 2
(Spain) D Marrero (Spain) T Robredo | 7 | 6
(Slovakia) M Kližan (Pakistan) A-u-H Qureshi | 7 | 6
Q | (Australia) R Junaid (Canada) A Shamasdin | 5 | 3
(Argentina) L Mayer (Argentina) J Mónaco | 1 | 6^{3}
WC | (Spain) A Montañés (Spain) A Ramos-Viñolas | 6 | 7^{7}
(Colombia) JS Cabal (Colombia) S Giraldo | 3 | 4
4 | (Austria) A Peya (Brazil) B Soares | 6 | 6
(Spain) P Carreño Busta (Australia) N Kyrgios | 2 | 6^{5}
(Croatia) M Draganja (Finland) H Kontinen | 6 | 7^{7}
WC | (Spain) G Granollers (Spain) O Roca Batalla | 3 | 0
2 | (Spain) M Granollers (Spain) M López | 6 | 6

Quarterfinals
(Spain) F López (Belarus) M Mirnyi | 4 | 7 | [8]
(United Kingdom) J Murray (Australia) J Peers | 6 | 5 | [10]
(Spain) D Marrero (Spain) T Robredo | 3 | 7^{7} | [6]
(Slovakia) M Kližan (Pakistan) A-u-H Qureshi | 6 | 6^{4} | [10]
WC | (Spain) A Montañés (Spain) A Ramos-Viñolas | 3 | 2
4 | (Austria) A Peya (Brazil) B Soares | 6 | 6
(Croatia) M Draganja (Finland) H Kontinen | 6 | 1 | [13]
2 | (Spain) M Granollers (Spain) M López | 4 | 6 | [11]

Semifinals
(United Kingdom) J Murray (Australia) J Peers | 6 | 7^{7}
(Slovakia) M Kližan (Pakistan) A-u-H Qureshi | 4 | 6^{4}
4 | (Austria) A Peya (Brazil) B Soares | 7^{7} | 4 | [10]
(Croatia) M Draganja (Finland) H Kontinen | 6^{5} | 6 | [12]

Final
(United Kingdom) J Murray (Australia) J Peers | 3 | 7^{8} | [9]
(Croatia) M Draganja (Finland) H Kontinen | 6 | 6^{6} | [11]

== Qualifying ==
=== Seeds ===
1. (Australia) Rameez Junaid / (Canada) Adil Shamasdin (qualified)
2. (Spain) Pablo Andújar / (Netherlands) Jesse Huta Galung (withdrew)

=== Qualifiers ===
1. (Australia) Rameez Junaid / (Canada) Adil Shamasdin

=== Qualifying draw ===
First round
1 | (Australia) Rameez Junaid (Canada) Adil Shamasdin | 6 | 7^{7}
(Kazakhstan) Mikhail Kukushkin (Australia) Marinko Matosevic | 2 | 6^{3}
WC | (Spain) Juan Lizariturry (Spain) Jaume Munar | 4 | 0
Alt | (Brazil) Thomaz Bellucci (Brazil) João Souza | 6 | 6

Qualifying competition
1 | (Australia) Rameez Junaid (Canada) Adil Shamasdin | 6 | 6
Alt | (Brazil) Thomaz Bellucci (Brazil) João Souza | 3 | 4
