= 2015 Shanghai Rolex Masters – Doubles =

Doubles
- 2015 Shanghai Rolex Masters

Final
- Champions: (South Africa) Raven Klaasen (Brazil) Marcelo Melo
- Runners-up: (Italy) Simone Bolelli (Italy) Fabio Fognini
- Score: 6–3, 6–3

Events
Singles	Doubles
← 2014 ·	Shanghai Masters	· 2016 →

Bob Bryan and Mike Bryan were the defending champions, but lost in the second round to Juan Sebastián Cabal and Robert Farah.
Raven Klaasen and Marcelo Melo won the title, defeating Simone Bolelli and Fabio Fognini in the final, 6–3, 6–3.

== Seeds ==
All seeds received a bye into the second round.

1. (United States) Bob Bryan / (United States) Mike Bryan (second round)
2. (Netherlands) Jean-Julien Rojer / (Romania) Horia Tecău (second round)
3. (Poland) Marcin Matkowski / (Serbia) Nenad Zimonjić (quarterfinals)
4. (France) Pierre-Hugues Herbert / (France) Nicolas Mahut (quarterfinals, withdrew)
5. (Italy) Simone Bolelli / (Italy) Fabio Fognini (final)
6. (South Africa) Raven Klaasen / (Brazil) Marcelo Melo (champions)
7. (Canada) Daniel Nestor / (France) Édouard Roger-Vasselin (semifinals)
8. (India) Rohan Bopanna / (Poland) Łukasz Kubot (semifinals)

== Draw ==
=== Key ===
- Q = Qualifier
- WC = Wild card
- LL = Lucky loser
- Alt = Alternate
- SE = Special exempt
- PR = Protected ranking
- ITF = ITF entry
- JE = Junior exempt
- w/o = Walkover
- r = Retired
- d = Defaulted
- SR = Special ranking

=== Finals ===
Semifinals
7	(Canada) Daniel Nestor (France) Édouard Roger-Vasselin	7	6^{5}	[3]
5	(Italy) Simone Bolelli (Italy) Fabio Fognini	5	7^{7}	[10]
6	(South Africa) Raven Klaasen (Brazil) Marcelo Melo	6	6^{1}	[10]
8	(India) Rohan Bopanna (Poland) Łukasz Kubot	3	7^{7}	[7]

Final
5	(Italy) Simone Bolelli (Italy) Fabio Fognini	3	3
6	(South Africa) Raven Klaasen (Brazil) Marcelo Melo	6	6

=== Top half ===
First round
(Colombia) JS Cabal (Colombia) R Farah	6	6
WC	(China) M Gong (China) Ze Zhang	3	4
(India) L Paes (Australia) J Peers	6	6
(Spain) T Robredo (Italy) A Seppi	3	4
(Belgium) D Goffin (Austria) D Thiem	6	6
WC	(China) D Wu (China) Zh Zhang	3	3
Alt	(Spain) R Bautista Agut (Spain) D Marrero	1	4
(United States) J Isner (United States) S Querrey	6	6

Second round
1	(United States) B Bryan (United States) M Bryan	7^{7}	6^{7}	[7]
(Colombia) JS Cabal (Colombia) R Farah	6^{1}	7^{9}	[10]
(India) L Paes (Australia) J Peers	3	1
7	(Canada) D Nestor (France) É Roger-Vasselin	6	6
4	(France) P-H Herbert (France) N Mahut	7^{11}	6
(Belgium) D Goffin (Austria) D Thiem	6^{9}	1
(United States) J Isner (United States) S Querrey	4	4
5	(Italy) S Bolelli (Italy) F Fognini	6	6

Quarterfinals
(Colombia) JS Cabal (Colombia) R Farah	3	4
7	(Canada) D Nestor (France) É Roger-Vasselin	6	6
4	(France) P-H Herbert (France) N Mahut
5	(Italy) S Bolelli (Italy) F Fognini	w/o

Semifinals
7	(Canada) D Nestor (France) É Roger-Vasselin	7	6^{5}	[3]
5	(Italy) S Bolelli (Italy) F Fognini	5	7^{7}	[10]

=== Bottom half ===
First round
(South Africa) K Anderson (France) J Chardy	6	1	[10]
(Uruguay) P Cuevas (Serbia) V Troicki	1	6	[8]
(Canada) V Pospisil (United States) J Sock	6^{3}	5
(Australia) N Kyrgios (Australia) B Tomic	7^{7}	7
(United Kingdom) D Inglot (Sweden) R Lindstedt	6	6^{5}	[10]
(Austria) A Peya (Brazil) B Soares	4	7^{7}	[3]
(Spain) F López (Belarus) M Mirnyi	6	7^{7}
(Spain) G García López (Argentina) L Mayer	3	6^{4}

Second round
6	(South Africa) R Klaasen (Brazil) M Melo	6	6
(South Africa) K Anderson (France) J Chardy	2	3
(Australia) N Kyrgios (Australia) B Tomic	7^{7}	4	[8]
3	(Poland) M Matkowski (Serbia) N Zimonjić	6^{4}	6	[10]
8	(India) R Bopanna (Poland) Ł Kubot	6	7^{7}
(United Kingdom) D Inglot (Sweden) R Lindstedt	3	6^{4}
(Spain) F López (Belarus) M Mirnyi	7	7
2	(Netherlands) J-J Rojer (Romania) H Tecău	5	5

Quarterfinals
6	(South Africa) R Klaasen (Brazil) M Melo	6	6
3	(Poland) M Matkowski (Serbia) N Zimonjić	2	4
8	(India) R Bopanna (Poland) Ł Kubot	6	7
(Spain) F López (Belarus) M Mirnyi	4	5

Semifinals
6	(South Africa) R Klaasen (Brazil) M Melo	6	6^{1}	[10]
8	(India) R Bopanna (Poland) Ł Kubot	3	7^{7}	[7]
