= 2016 Shanghai Rolex Masters – Doubles =

Doubles
- 2016 Shanghai Rolex Masters

Final
- Champions: (United States) John Isner (United States) Jack Sock
- Runners-up: (Finland) Henri Kontinen (Australia) John Peers
- Score: 6–4, 6–4

Events
Singles	Doubles
← 2015 ·	Shanghai Masters	· 2017 →

Raven Klaasen and Marcelo Melo were the defending champions, but decided not to participate together. Klaasen teamed up with Rajeev Ram, but they lost to Jo-Wilfried Tsonga and Nenad Zimonjić in the second round. Melo played alongside Łukasz Kubot, but they lost to Pablo Cuevas and Marcel Granollers in the second round.

John Isner and Jack Sock won the title, defeating Henri Kontinen and John Peers in the final, 6–4, 6–4.

== Seeds ==
All seeds received a bye into the second round.

1. (United Kingdom) Jamie Murray / (Brazil) Bruno Soares (quarterfinals)
2. (United States) Bob Bryan / (United States) Mike Bryan (semifinals)
3. (Poland) Łukasz Kubot / (Brazil) Marcelo Melo (second round)
4. (Spain) Feliciano López / (Spain) Marc López (quarterfinals)
5. (South Africa) Raven Klaasen / (United States) Rajeev Ram (second round)
6. (India) Rohan Bopanna / (Canada) Daniel Nestor (second round)
7. (Philippines) Treat Huey / (Belarus) Max Mirnyi (second round)
8. (Sweden) Robert Lindstedt / (Canada) Vasek Pospisil (second round)

== Draw ==
=== Key ===
- Q = Qualifier
- WC = Wild card
- LL = Lucky loser
- Alt = Alternate
- SE = Special exempt
- PR = Protected ranking
- ITF = ITF entry
- JE = Junior exempt
- w/o = Walkover
- r = Retired
- d = Defaulted
- SR = Special ranking

=== Finals ===
Semifinals
(Finland) Henri Kontinen (Australia) John Peers	6	6
(Croatia) Marin Čilić (Croatia) Mate Pavić	3	4
(United States) John Isner (United States) Jack Sock	6	7^{7}
2	(United States) Bob Bryan (United States) Mike Bryan	2	6^{2}

Final
(Finland) Henri Kontinen (Australia) John Peers	4	4
(United States) John Isner (United States) Jack Sock	6	6

=== Top half ===
First round
WC	(China) Z Li (China) D Wu	5	6^{4}
(Spain) R Bautista Agut (Spain) D Ferrer	7	7^{7}
(Finland) H Kontinen (Australia) J Peers	6	6
PR	(Germany) P Petzschner (Germany) A Zverev	2	3
(Austria) O Marach (France) F Martin	2	6^{4}
(Uruguay) P Cuevas (Spain) M Granollers	6	7^{7}
(Italy) P Lorenzi (Spain) A Ramos Viñolas	2	4
(Croatia) M Čilić (Croatia) M Pavić	6	6

Second round
1	(United Kingdom) J Murray (Brazil) B Soares	w/o
(Spain) R Bautista Agut (Spain) D Ferrer
(Finland) H Kontinen (Australia) J Peers	6^{5}	6	[10]
8	(Sweden) R Lindstedt (Canada) V Pospisil	7^{7}	1	[7]
3	(Poland) Ł Kubot (Brazil) M Melo	6	4	[4]
(Uruguay) P Cuevas (Spain) M Granollers	4	6	[10]
(Croatia) M Čilić (Croatia) M Pavić	5	6	[10]
6	(India) R Bopanna (Canada) D Nestor	7	4	[8]

Quarterfinals
1	(United Kingdom) J Murray (Brazil) B Soares	3	6^{4}
(Finland) H Kontinen (Australia) J Peers	6	7^{7}
(Uruguay) P Cuevas (Spain) M Granollers	6^{5}	3
(Croatia) M Čilić (Croatia) M Pavić	7^{7}	6

Semifinals
(Finland) H Kontinen (Australia) J Peers	6	6
(Croatia) M Čilić (Croatia) M Pavić	3	4

=== Bottom half ===
First round
WC	(China) M Gong (China) Z Zhang	3	3
(United States) J Isner (United States) J Sock	6	6
(France) J Benneteau (France) É Roger-Vasselin	7^{11}	3	[8]
(Colombia) JS Cabal (Colombia) R Farah	6^{9}	6	[10]
(United States) S Johnson (United States) S Querrey	4	4
(France) J-W Tsonga (Serbia) N Zimonjić	6	6
(Slovakia) M Kližan (Portugal) J Sousa	4	4
(Poland) M Matkowski (Netherlands) J-J Rojer	6	6

Second round
7	(Philippines) T Huey (Belarus) M Mirnyi	6	6^{6}	[5]
(United States) J Isner (United States) J Sock	1	7^{8}	[10]
(Colombia) JS Cabal (Colombia) R Farah	6^{4}	3
4	(Spain) F López (Spain) M López	7^{7}	6
5	(South Africa) R Klaasen (United States) R Ram	4	2
(France) J-W Tsonga (Serbia) N Zimonjić	6	6
(Poland) M Matkowski (Netherlands) J-J Rojer	1	6^{3}
2	(United States) B Bryan (United States) M Bryan	6	7^{7}

Quarterfinals
(United States) J Isner (United States) J Sock	6^{4}	6	[10]
4	(Spain) F López (Spain) M López	7^{7}	4	[7]
(France) J-W Tsonga (Serbia) N Zimonjić	4	5
2	(United States) B Bryan (United States) M Bryan	6	7

Semifinals
(United States) J Isner (United States) J Sock	6	7^{7}
2	(United States) B Bryan (United States) M Bryan	2	6^{2}
