= John Peers =

Australian tennis player (born 1988)

John Peers OAM
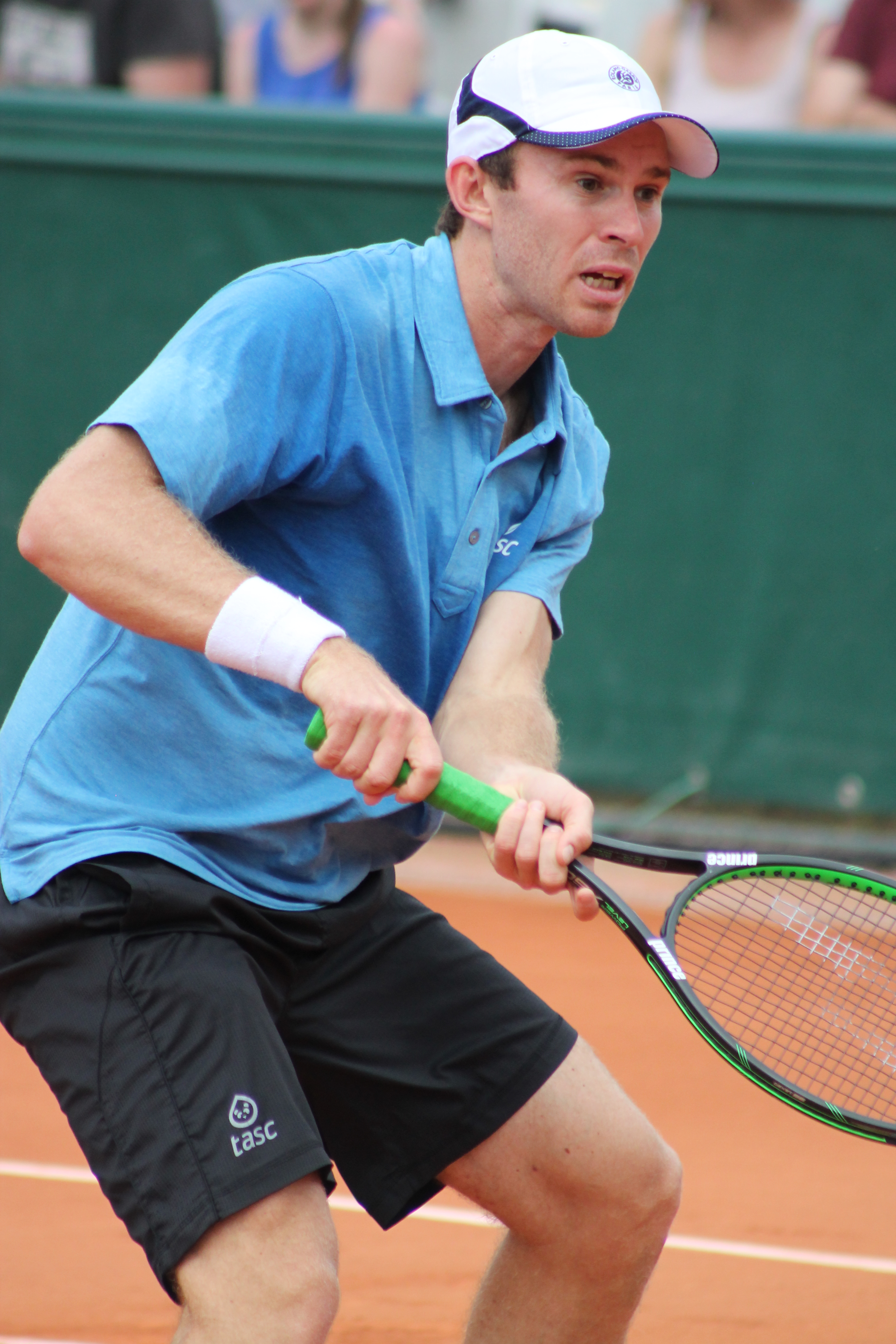
- Peers at 2016 French Open
- Country (sports): Australia
- Residence: Melbourne, Victoria, Australia
- Born: 25 July 1988 (age 38) Melbourne, Victoria, Australia
- Height: 188 cm (6 ft 2 in)
- Turned pro: 2011
- Plays: Right-handed (two-handed backhand)
- College: Middle Tennessee State University; Baylor University
- Coach: Chris Eaton
- Prize money: $6,229,245
- Official website: johnpeerstennis.com

Singles
- Career record: 0–1
- Career titles: 0
- Highest ranking: No. 456 (11 June 2012)

Doubles
- Career record: 435–303
- Career titles: 30
- Highest ranking: No. 2 (3 April 2017)
- Current ranking: No. 51

Grand Slam doubles results
- Australian Open: W (2017)
- French Open: QF (2018, 2025)
- Wimbledon: F (2015)
- US Open: F (2015)

Other doubles tournaments
- Tour Finals: W (2016, 2017)
- Olympic Games: W (2024)

Mixed doubles
- Career titles: 3

Grand Slam mixed doubles results
- Australian Open: W (2025, 2026)
- French Open: SF (2022)
- Wimbledon: SF (2021)
- US Open: W (2022)

Other mixed doubles tournaments
- Olympic Games: Bronze (2021)
Medal record
Representing Australia
Olympic Games
| Gold medal – first place | 2024 Paris | Men's doubles |
| Bronze medal – third place | 2020 Tokyo | Mixed doubles |
- Last updated on: 30 January 2026.

John William Peers (born 25 July 1988) is an Australian professional tennis player who specialises in doubles. He has been ranked by the Association of Tennis Professionals (ATP) as high as world No. 2 in doubles, which he achieved on 3 April 2017, and No. 456 in singles, attained on 11 June 2012. He has won 30 doubles titles on the ATP Tour.

Peers has competed three times at the Olympic Games, winning the mixed doubles bronze medal in 2021 with Ashleigh Barty, and the doubles gold medal in 2024 with Matthew Ebden.

Peers has won four majors, in men's doubles at the 2017 Australian Open, with Henri Kontinen and three in mixed doubles – at the 2022 US Open with Storm Sanders and in the 2025–26 editions of the Australian Open, with Olivia Gadecki. He also was a runner-up at the Wimbledon Championships and US Open in 2015, with Jamie Murray and at the 2019 Australian Open, with Kontinen. Other significant titles include the 2016 and 2017 ATP Finals, as well as four ATP 1000-level trophies.

Peers has represented Australia in the Davis Cup since 2016.

== Personal life ==
His mother, Elizabeth Little, and sister, Sally Peers, are also former professional tennis players.

== Professional ==
=== 2013 ===
Peers began the 2013 season playing with fellow Australian John-Patrick Smith, receiving a wildcard into the Australian Open. It was here that Peers gained his first Grand Slam victory, upsetting the Polish duo of Mariusz Fyrstenberg and Marcin Matkowski in their opening match; in the second round they fell to Sergiy Stakhovsky and Mikhail Youzhny in straight sets. In February, Peers teamed up with established doubles specialist Jamie Murray, a partnership that immediately looked to be a successful one, as the pair reached the semifinals of their first tournament together at the Open Sud de France. A couple of months later, Peers and Murray won their first title together, defeating 13-time Grand Slam champions and world No. 1 pair Bob and Mike Bryan in the final of the U.S. Men's Clay Court Championships after coming back from a set down.

The pair played their first Grand Slam tournament together at the French Open, however despite taking out the 15th seeded team of Knowle and Polášek in the first round, they ultimately fell in their next match against the Colombian duo of Juan Sebastián Cabal and Robert Farah Maksoud. This however allowed them to compete at the Aegon Trophy, a Challenger event which they ultimately won. Peers and Murray then went on to have a fairly successful grass court season, reaching the quarterfinals of the Aegon Championships, and the semifinals of the Aegon Championships. They headed to Wimbledon in a confident mindset, however, went out in the first round to James Blake and Jürgen Melzer in a 5-set thriller that ended 14–12 in an 87-minute final set. Their early loss did not dishearten them however, and the pair went on to win their second title of the year a few weeks later, at the Crédit Agricole Suisse Open Gstaad.

At the US Open, the pair had their most successful run at a Grand Slam tournament, making it all the way to the quarterfinals, defeating ninth seeds David Marrero and Fernando Verdasco on the way. In the end, the pair succumbed to eventual finalists Alexander Peya and Bruno Soares in three sets. Next up for the pair was the Asian swing of tournaments, where they had their best run of results to date, making two finals in a row and competing in their first Masters 1000 tournament as partners. At the PTT Thailand Open, the pair were seeded third and went on to win their third title of the year. Peers and Murray defeated multiple Grand Slam champion and former world No. 1 Leander Paes on their way to the final, where they defeated Tomasz Bednarek and Johan Brunström in three sets. The following week, Peers and Murray reached their second final in a row, Peers' first ATP 500 final at the Rakuten Japan Open. Despite a close first set, the pair lost to established doubles pairing of Rohan Bopanna and Édouard Roger-Vasselin in straight sets.

Peers competed in his first ever Masters 1000 tournament at the Shanghai Masters, where he and Murray defeated established doubles champions Julien Benneteau, Nenad Zimonjić and Robert Lindstedt on their way to the semifinals, where they lost in straight sets to Spanish duo of Marrero and Verdasco, in a closely fought contest that ended up being decided by two tiebreakers.

=== 2014 ===
Peers began the year with regular doubles partner Jamie Murray at the Brisbane International. The pair made it to the semifinals, before losing to Daniel Nestor and Mariusz Fyrstenberg in straight sets. Their next tournament was the Heineken Open. They made the quarterfinals before withdrawing from the tournament. At the Australian Open they were the 15th seeds (the first time they were a seeded pair in a Grand Slam tournament). They made the second round before losing to Raven Klaasen and Eric Butorac in straight sets.

Peers played next at the 2014 ABN AMRO World Tennis Tournament with Julian Knowle while Jamie Murray was out with injury. The pair made it to the quarterfinals before losing to Julien Benneteau and Édouard Roger-Vasselin. Peers next played at the 2014 Open 13 with Jesse Huta Galung, but the pair lost in the first round. Peers next played at the 2014 Dubai Tennis Championships with previous partner Julian Knowle, but they lost in the first round.

Peers next played the Indian Wells Open with regular partner Jamie Murray but the pair lost in the first round to Benneteau and Roger-Vasselin. They next played at the Sony Open Tennis but lost in straight sets to sixth seeds Daniel Nestor and Nenad Zimonjić.

Peers and Murray started their clay court season at the Grand Prix Hassan II where they were seeded seconDlouhý]] and Tomasz Bednarek in straight sets. They made a second consecutive semi-final at the BRD Năstase Țiriac Trophy before losing to top seeds Jean-Julien Rojer and Horia Tecău.

At the BMW Open the pair defeated the top seeds Raven Klaasen and Eric Butorac in the semi-finals before defeating Colin Fleming and Ross Hutchins to win their first title of the year. They lost in the opening round of the Mutua Madrid Open, but managed to bounce back and reach the semi-finals of the Düsseldorf Open. They followed this up by reaching the third round of the French Open, which was both their best result at the tournament, where they were defeated by top seeds Bob and Mike Bryan.

They followed up the defeat by making the final of the Aegon Championships defeating the Bryan brothers in the second round but were beaten by second seeds Alexander Peya and Bruno Soares. They then lost their opening match of the Eastbourne International. At Wimbledon they were seeded 14th and made the third round before losing in five sets to Alexander Peya and Bruno Soares.

In August the pairing reached the final of the Winston-Salem Open as the third seeds but lost to the pairing of Cabal/Farah. In September, Murray/Peers also reached the final of the Malaysian Open as the second seeds but lost to fourth seeds Matkowski/Paes. The pair finished the year at the Swiss Indoors Open where they lost in the first round again to Matkowsi and Paes.

=== 2015: Wimbledon & US Open finalist ===
Murray/Peers again began their year at the 2015 Brisbane International, where they defeated top seeds Rojer/Tecau in the first round before going on to win the title by defeating the pairing of Dolgopolov/Nishikori. The pair reached the third round at the 2015 Australian Open as the 16th seeds losing to 4th seeds Dodig/Melo. The pair's good form continued in Rotterdam, where after losing in the qualifying rounds they were handed a first-round match as lucky losers following a withdrawal. The pair went on to reach the final, before losing in a rematch against Rojer/Tecău.

In April, the pair reached their third final of the year in Barcelona, but lost to Draganja/Kontinen. In May, the pair reached back-to-back quarterfinals at ATP 1000 Masters in Madrid and Rome. In Madrid they lost to Lopez/Mirnyi, and in Rome they lost to eventual finalists Granollers/López.

In July, Murray/Peers reached the final of the 2015 Wimbledon Championships losing to Rojer/Tecău in straight sets.

=== 2016: First World Tour Finals & Masters titles ===
The Olympic year brought changes to the doubles pairing. Also Peers chose a new partner, Henri Kontinen, to defend his title at the Brisbane International. The number 2 seeded pair reached the final beating the number 4 couple Inglot/Lindstedt, and went on to win the title by defeating Peers' compatriots Duckworth/Guccione. Peers and Kontinen separated for the next tournament in Sydney, and got beaten by the same opponents, the fourth seeds Bopanna/Mergea, in the second and the first round respectively. At the Australian Open Kontinen/Peers lost in the second round to Groth/Hewitt.

As a member of the Australian Davis Cup squad, Peers played a World Group 1st round rubber with Lleyton Hewitt against the American couple Bryan/Bryan. The Australian pair lost, letting the United States take a 2–1 lead in the tie. Eventually, Australia lost the tie, which meant that it would have to face the play-offs.

At the ABN AMRO World Tennis Tournament in Rotterdam, Kontinen/Peers managed to beat the second seeds Dodig/Melo before losing to Mahut/Pospisil in the semifinals. The pair stuck together even though they had a series of first round defeats, until reaching quarterfinals at the Monte-Carlo Masters. They were defeated by Cabal/Farah, despite a promising victory over the top seeds Rojer/Tecău in the second round. In Munich Kontinen/Peers fought their way into the final to encounter Cabal/Farah again. This time the outcome was reversed allowing Peers to celebrate his second ATP tournament title of the year with his Finnish companion.

At the Madrid Open Peers/Kontinen started well beating the second seeds Murray/Soares in the second round. In the quarterfinals the two had a new chance to beat Bopanna/Mergea, this time together, but they lost the match tie-break. In Rome they had to leave the tournament after another first round defeat. Also Roland Garros was a disappointment for the already consolidated pair, as they were sent home by Baker/Daniell already in the round of 32.

In Halle Kontinen/Peers lost at the semifinals to Kubot/Peya. This prepared the players for the grass courts of Wimbledon, where they were to achieve their best Grand Slam tournament result so far. As 10th seeds the couple finally defeated Bopanna/Mergea by winning 8–6 the 5th set of the third round match. However, the pair's destiny was to get defeated in the next round by the top seeds Herbert/Mahut.

Peers and Kontinen continued in Hamburg at the 500 series tournament. They played without dropping a set all the way to the final, to play against Nestor/Qureshi. Neither these opponents could steal a set from the number two seeded pair, which thus obtained their third ATP title together.

Kontinen/Peers then headed to the American continent, reaching semifinals at the Citi Open and quarterfinals at Rogers Cup. Peers participated the Rio Olympics teaming with Chris Guccione. However, the pair lost their first match against the Argentine couple del Potro/González. In Cincinnati Peers tried to conquer the tournament with Kontinen, but they lost in the first round to Pouille/Tsonga. Their luck did not change by the time of US Open. After an initial victory over Delbonis/Pella, they were beaten in the second round by unseeded Lindstedt/Qureshi.

In September, Peers played again in the Davis Cup squad. With Sam Groth he defeated Martin/Zelenay of Slovakia, leading Australia to 3–0 victory that guaranteed a place in the following year's World Group.

At the Japan Open in Tokyo, Peers and Kontinen did not get past the first round, losing to Lindstedt/Peya. At the Shanghai Masters the pair performed better, beating the 8th seeded Lindstedt/Pospisil in the second round and the top-seeded Myrray/Soares in the quarterfinals. By defeating the unseeded Čilić/Pavić in the semifinals they were one step away from winning the tournament, but their final opponents Isner/Sock grabbed the title with more relaxed playing.

Peers and Kontinen then appeared at the Swiss Indoors, where they lost in the first round to second seeds Herbert/Mahut in straight sets. One week later at the BNP Paribas Masters event in Paris the duo made it all the way to the final without dropping a set where they again met Herbert and Mahut. This time they came out victorious in three sets to win their fourth title together and their first Masters title overall.

Peers/Kontinen qualified in 5th position for the World Tour Finals in London and was placed in the Fleming/McEnroe group with López/López, Klaasen/Ram and Herbert/Mahut. They progressed to the semi-finals after defeating each of their opponents in the group stage. In the semi-finals Kontinen/Peers faced off against Bob Bryan and Mike Bryan and came out with a 7–6, 6–4 victory to move on to the final against Klaasen and Ram. They emerged victorious yet again, winning 2–6, 6–1 [10–8] to claim their biggest tournament win to date. Peers ended the year at No. 9 on the Doubles Rankings, boosted by his success later in the year.

=== 2017: Australian Open title, world No. 2 in doubles ===
Peers began the new year with his regular doubles partner Kontinen at Brisbane as the second seeds, however lost in the first round to Nishikori/Thiem in three sets. The duo then arrived at the Australian Open as the fourth seeds. They easily won their first- and second-round matches against González/Marrero and Baghdatis/Müller. Peers and Kontinen then faced Colombian pair Cabal and Farah and won in three gruelling tiebreakers to progress to the quarterfinals. There they faced the Australian duo of Sam Groth and Chris Guccione and won. In the semifinals, they faced another Australian pairing of Marc Polmans and Andrew Whittington. They progressed to their first Grand Slam final, where they won in straight sets against the Bryan brothers.

=== 2021: First Olympic mixed doubles bronze medal for Australia, fourth Masters title ===
Peers represented Australia at the 2020 Summer Olympics in two events. In doubles, Peers partnered Max Purcell and lost in the first round. In mixed doubles, Peers partnered Ashleigh Barty, and they won bronze. Their bronze was Australia's first ever medal in an Olympic mixed doubles competition.

At the Indian Wells Open, he won his fourth Masters 1000 and 25th title overall partnering with new partner Slovak Filip Polášek, with whom he also reached the final of the San Diego Open earlier in the year.

=== 2022–2024: Olympics gold medal, US Open mixed doubles title ===
Alongside Storm Sanders, Peers won the mixed doubles title at the US Open, over coming Kirsten Flipkens and Édouard Roger-Vasselin in the final which went to a deciding champions tiebreak.

At the 2024 Paris Olympics, he partnered Matthew Ebden and defeated the United States' Austin Krajicek and Rajeev Ram in the final to win Australia's first tennis gold medal since 1996.

Partnering Jamie Murray, he won the title at the 2024 Swiss Indoors, defeating Wesley Koolhof and Nikola Mektić in the final. They also took the title at the 2024 Belgrade Open, with a win over Ivan Dodig and Skander Mansouri in the final.

=== 2025: Australian Open mixed doubles title ===
Partnering Olivia Gadecki, Peers won the mixed doubles title at the Australian Open, defeating Kimberly Birrell and John-Patrick Smith in the final.

== Grand Slam tournaments finals ==
=== Doubles: 4 (1 title, 3 runner-ups) ===
| Result | Year | Tournament | Surface | Partner | Opponents | Score |
|---|---|---|---|---|---|---|
| Loss | 2015 | Wimbledon | Grass | (United Kingdom) Jamie Murray | (Netherlands) Jean-Julien Rojer (Romania) Horia Tecău | 6–7^{(5–7)}, 4–6, 4–6 |
| Loss | 2015 | US Open | Hard | (United Kingdom) Jamie Murray | (France) Pierre-Hugues Herbert (France) Nicolas Mahut | 4–6, 4–6 |
| Win | 2017 | Australian Open | Hard | (Finland) Henri Kontinen | (United States) Bob Bryan (United States) Mike Bryan | 7–5, 7–5 |
| Loss | 2019 | Australian Open | Hard | (Finland) Henri Kontinen | (France) Pierre-Hugues Herbert (France) Nicolas Mahut | 4–6, 6–7^{(1–7)} |

=== Mixed doubles: 3 (3 titles) ===
| Result | Year | Tournament | Surface | Partner | Opponents | Score |
|---|---|---|---|---|---|---|
| Win | 2022 | US Open | Hard | (Australia) Storm Sanders | (Belgium) Kirsten Flipkens (France) Édouard Roger-Vasselin | 4–6, 6–4, [10–7] |
| Win | 2025 | Australian Open | Hard | (Australia) Olivia Gadecki | (Australia) Kimberly Birrell (Australia) John-Patrick Smith | 3–6, 6–4, [10–6] |
| Win | 2026 | Australian Open (2) | Hard | (Australia) Olivia Gadecki | (France) Kristina Mladenovic (France) Manuel Guinard | 4–6, 6–3, [10–8] |

== Other significant finals ==
=== Summer Olympics ===
==== Doubles: 1 (gold medal) ====
| Result | Year | Tournament | Surface | Partner | Opponents | Score |
|---|---|---|---|---|---|---|
| Gold | 2024 | Paris Olympics | Clay | (Australia) Matthew Ebden | (United States) Austin Krajicek (United States) Rajeev Ram | 6–7^{(6–8)}, 7–6^{(7–1)}, [10–8] |

==== Mixed doubles: 1 (bronze medal) ====
| Result | Year | Tournament | Surface | Partner | Opponents | Score |
|---|---|---|---|---|---|---|
| Bronze | 2021 | Tokyo Olympics | Hard | (Australia) Ashleigh Barty | (Serbia) Nina Stojanović (Serbia) Novak Djokovic | walkover |

=== Year-end championships ===
==== Doubles: 2 (2 titles) ====
| Result | Year | Tournament | Surface | Partner | Opponents | Score |
|---|---|---|---|---|---|---|
| Win | 2016 | ATP Finals, United Kingdom | Hard (i) | (Finland) Henri Kontinen | (South Africa) Raven Klaasen (United States) Rajeev Ram | 2–6, 6–1, [10–8] |
| Win | 2017 | ATP Finals, United Kingdom (2) | Hard (i) | (Finland) Henri Kontinen | (Poland) Łukasz Kubot (Brazil) Marcelo Melo | 6–4, 6–2 |

=== ATP 1000 tournaments ===
==== Doubles: 6 (4 titles, 2 runner-ups) ====
| Result | Year | Tournament | Surface | Partner | Opponents | Score |
|---|---|---|---|---|---|---|
| Loss | 2016 | Shanghai Masters | Hard | (Finland) Henri Kontinen | (United States) John Isner (United States) Jack Sock | 4–6, 4–6 |
| Win | 2016 | Paris Masters | Hard (i) | (Finland) Henri Kontinen | (France) Pierre-Hugues Herbert (France) Nicolas Mahut | 6–4, 3–6, [10–6] |
| Win | 2017 | Shanghai Masters | Hard | (Finland) Henri Kontinen | (Poland) Łukasz Kubot (Brazil) Marcelo Melo | 6–4, 6–2 |
| Win | 2018 | Canadian Open | Hard | (Finland) Henri Kontinen | (South Africa) Raven Klaasen (New Zealand) Michael Venus | 6–2, 6–7^{(7–9)}, [10–6] |
| Win | 2021 | Indian Wells Masters | Hard | (Slovakia) Filip Polášek | (Russia) Aslan Karatsev (Russia) Andrey Rublev | 6–3, 7–6^{(7–5)} |
| Loss | 2022 | Canadian Open | Hard | (United Kingdom) Dan Evans | (Netherlands) Wesley Koolhof (United Kingdom) Neal Skupski | 2–6, 6–4, [6–10] |

== ATP Tour finals ==
=== Doubles: 50 (30 titles, 20 runner-ups) ===
| Legend Grand Slam (1–3) Olympics (1–0) ATP Finals (2–0) ATP Masters 1000 (4–2) ATP 500 (9–6) ATP 250 (13–9) | Finals by surface Hard (18–14) Clay (9–2) Grass (3–4) | Finals by setting Outdoor (23–15) Indoor (7–5) |

| Result | W–L | Date | Tournament | Tier | Surface | Partner | Opponents | Score |
|---|---|---|---|---|---|---|---|---|
| Win | 1–0 | Apr 2013 | U.S. Men's Clay Court Championships, United States | 250 Series | Clay | (United Kingdom) Jamie Murray | (United States) Bob Bryan (United States) Mike Bryan | 1–6, 7–6^{(7–3)}, [12–10] |
| Win | 2–0 | Jul 2013 | Swiss Open, Switzerland | 250 Series | Clay | (United Kingdom) Jamie Murray | (Spain) Pablo Andújar (Spain) Guillermo García López | 6–3, 6–4 |
| Win | 3–0 | Sep 2013 | Thailand Open | 250 Series | Hard (i) | (United Kingdom) Jamie Murray | (Poland) Tomasz Bednarek (Sweden) Johan Brunström | 6–3, 3–6, [10–6] |
| Loss | 3–1 | Oct 2013 | Japan Open | 500 Series | Hard | (United Kingdom) Jamie Murray | (India) Rohan Bopanna (France) Édouard Roger-Vasselin | 6–7^{(5–7)}, 4–6 |
| Win | 4–1 | May 2014 | Bavarian International Tennis Championships, Germany | 250 Series | Clay | (United Kingdom) Jamie Murray | (United Kingdom) Colin Fleming (United Kingdom) Ross Hutchins | 6–4, 6–2 |
| Loss | 4–2 | Jun 2014 | Queen's Club Championships, United Kingdom | 250 Series | Grass | (United Kingdom) Jamie Murray | (Austria) Alexander Peya (Brazil) Bruno Soares | 6–4, 6–7^{(4–7)}, [4–10] |
| Loss | 4–3 | Aug 2014 | Winston-Salem Open, United States | 250 Series | Hard | (United Kingdom) Jamie Murray | (Colombia) Juan Sebastián Cabal (Colombia) Robert Farah | 3–6, 4–6 |
| Loss | 4–4 | Sep 2014 | Malaysian Open | 250 Series | Hard (i) | (United Kingdom) Jamie Murray | (Poland) Marcin Matkowski (India) Leander Paes | 6–3, 6–7^{(5–7)}, [5–10] |
| Win | 5–4 | Jan 2015 | Brisbane International, Australia | 250 Series | Hard | (United Kingdom) Jamie Murray | (Ukraine) Alexandr Dolgopolov (Japan) Kei Nishikori | 6–3, 7–6^{(7–4)} |
| Loss | 5–5 | Feb 2015 | Rotterdam Open, Netherlands | 500 Series | Hard (i) | (United Kingdom) Jamie Murray | (Netherlands) Jean-Julien Rojer (Romania) Horia Tecău | 6–3, 3–6, [8–10] |
| Loss | 5–6 | Apr 2015 | Barcelona Open, Spain | 500 Series | Clay | (United Kingdom) Jamie Murray | (Croatia) Marin Draganja (Finland) Henri Kontinen | 3–6, 7–6^{(8–6)}, [9–11] |
| Loss | 5–7 | Jul 2015 | Wimbledon, United Kingdom | Grand Slam | Grass | (United Kingdom) Jamie Murray | (Netherlands) Jean-Julien Rojer (Romania) Horia Tecău | 6–7^{(5–7)}, 4–6, 4–6 |
| Win | 6–7 | Aug 2015 | German Open | 500 Series | Clay | (United Kingdom) Jamie Murray | (Colombia) Juan Sebastián Cabal (Colombia) Robert Farah | 2–6, 6–3, [10–8] |
| Loss | 6–8 | Sep 2015 | US Open | Grand Slam | Hard | (United Kingdom) Jamie Murray | (France) Pierre-Hugues Herbert (France) Nicolas Mahut | 4–6, 4–6 |
| Loss | 6–9 | Oct 2015 | Vienna Open, Austria | 500 Series | Hard (i) | (United Kingdom) Jamie Murray | (Poland) Łukasz Kubot (Brazil) Marcelo Melo | 6–4, 6–7^{(3–7)}, [6–10] |
| Loss | 6–10 | Nov 2015 | Swiss Indoors, Switzerland | 500 Series | Hard (i) | (United Kingdom) Jamie Murray | (Austria) Alexander Peya (Brazil) Bruno Soares | 5–7, 5–7 |
| Win | 7–10 | Jan 2016 | Brisbane International, Australia (2) | 250 Series | Hard | (Finland) Henri Kontinen | (Australia) James Duckworth (Australia) Chris Guccione | 7–6^{(7–4)}, 6–1 |
| Win | 8–10 | May 2016 | Bavarian International Tennis Championships, Germany (2) | 250 Series | Clay | (Finland) Henri Kontinen | (Colombia) Juan Sebastián Cabal (Colombia) Robert Farah | 6–3, 3–6, [10–7] |
| Win | 9–10 | Jul 2016 | German Open (2) | 500 Series | Clay | (Finland) Henri Kontinen | (Canada) Daniel Nestor (Pakistan) Aisam-ul-Haq Qureshi | 7–5, 6–3 |
| Loss | 9–11 | Oct 2016 | Shanghai Masters, China | Masters 1000 | Hard | (Finland) Henri Kontinen | (United States) Jack Sock (United States) John Isner | 4–6, 4–6 |
| Win | 10–11 | Nov 2016 | Paris Masters, France | Masters 1000 | Hard (i) | (Finland) Henri Kontinen | (France) Pierre-Hugues Herbert (France) Nicolas Mahut | 6–4, 3–6, [10–6] |
| Win | 11–11 | Nov 2016 | ATP World Tour Finals, London | Tour Finals | Hard (i) | (Finland) Henri Kontinen | (South Africa) Raven Klaasen (United States) Rajeev Ram | 2–6, 6–1, [10–8] |
| Win | 12–11 | Jan 2017 | Australian Open | Grand Slam | Hard | (Finland) Henri Kontinen | (United States) Bob Bryan (United States) Mike Bryan | 7–5, 7–5 |
| Win | 13–11 | Aug 2017 | Washington Open, United States | 500 Series | Hard | (Finland) Henri Kontinen | (Poland) Łukasz Kubot (Brazil) Marcelo Melo | 7–6^{(7–5)}, 6–4 |
| Win | 14–11 | Oct 2017 | China Open | 500 Series | Hard | (Finland) Henri Kontinen | (United States) John Isner (United States) Jack Sock | 6–3, 3–6, [10–7] |
| Win | 15–11 | Oct 2017 | Shanghai Masters, China (2) | Masters 1000 | Hard | (Finland) Henri Kontinen | (Poland) Łukasz Kubot (Brazil) Marcelo Melo | 6–4, 6–2 |
| Win | 16–11 | Nov 2017 | ATP Finals, London (2) | Tour Finals | Hard (i) | (Finland) Henri Kontinen | (Poland) Łukasz Kubot (Brazil) Marcelo Melo | 6–4, 6–2 |
| Win | 17–11 | Jan 2018 | Brisbane International, Australia (3) | 250 Series | Hard | (Finland) Henri Kontinen | (Argentina) Leonardo Mayer (Argentina) Horacio Zeballos | 3–6, 6–3, [10–2] |
| Win | 18–11 | Jun 2018 | Queen's Club Championships, United Kingdom (2) | 500 Series | Grass | (Finland) Henri Kontinen | (United Kingdom) Jamie Murray (Brazil) Bruno Soares | 6–4, 6–3 |
| Win | 19–11 | Aug 2018 | Canadian Open | Masters 1000 | Hard | (Finland) Henri Kontinen | (South Africa) Raven Klaasen (New Zealand) Michael Venus | 6–2, 6–7^{(7–9)}, [10–6] |
| Loss | 19–12 | Jan 2019 | Australian Open | Grand Slam | Hard | (Finland) Henri Kontinen | (France) Pierre-Hugues Herbert (France) Nicolas Mahut | 4–6, 6–7^{(1–7)} |
| Win | 20–12 | Jun 2019 | Stuttgart Open, Germany | 250 Series | Grass | (Brazil) Bruno Soares | (India) Rohan Bopanna (Canada) Denis Shapovalov | 7–5, 6–3 |
| Win | 21–12 | Feb 2020 | Dubai Tennis Championships, United Arab Emirates | 500 Series | Hard | (New Zealand) Michael Venus | (South Africa) Raven Klaasen (Austria) Oliver Marach | 6–3, 6–2 |
| Win | 22–12 | Sep 2020 | Hamburg European Open, Germany | 500 Series | Clay | (New Zealand) Michael Venus | (Croatia) Ivan Dodig (Croatia) Mate Pavić | 6–3, 6–4 |
| Win | 23–12 | Oct 2020 | European Open, Belgium | 250 Series | Hard (i) | (New Zealand) Michael Venus | (India) Rohan Bopanna (Netherlands) Matwé Middelkoop | 6–3, 6–4 |
| Win | 24–12 | May 2021 | Geneva Open, Switzerland | 250 Series | Clay | (New Zealand) Michael Venus | (Italy) Simone Bolelli (Argentina) Máximo González | 6–2, 7–5 |
| Loss | 24–13 | Jun 2021 | Queen's Club Championships, United Kingdom (3) | 500 Series | Grass | (United States) Reilly Opelka | (France) Pierre-Hugues Herbert (France) Nicolas Mahut | 4–6, 5–7 |
| Loss | 24–14 | Oct 2021 | San Diego Open, United States | 250 Series | Hard | (Slovakia) Filip Polášek | (United Kingdom) Joe Salisbury (United Kingdom) Neal Skupski | 6–7^{(2–7)}, 6–3, [5–10] |
| Win | 25–14 | Oct 2021 | Indian Wells Masters, United States | Masters 1000 | Hard | (Slovakia) Filip Polášek | (Russia) Aslan Karatsev (Russia) Andrey Rublev | 6–3, 7–6^{(7–5)} |
| Win | 26–14 | Jan 2022 | Sydney International, Australia | 250 Series | Hard | (Slovakia) Filip Polášek | (Italy) Simone Bolelli (Italy) Fabio Fognini | 7–5, 7–5 |
| Loss | 26–15 | Jul 2022 | Atlanta Open, United States | 250 Series | Hard | (Australia) Jason Kubler | (Australia) Thanasi Kokkinakis (Australia) Nick Kyrgios | 6–7^{(4–7)}, 5–7 |
| Loss | 26–16 | Aug 2022 | Canadian Open | Masters 1000 | Hard | (United Kingdom) Dan Evans | (Netherlands) Wesley Koolhof (United Kingdom) Neal Skupski | 2–6, 6–4, [6–10] |
| Loss | 26–17 | Oct 2022 | Tennis Napoli Cup, Italy | 250 Series | Hard | (Australia) Matthew Ebden | (Croatia) Ivan Dodig (United States) Austin Krajicek | 3–6, 6–1, [8–10] |
| Win | 27–17 | Jun 2023 | Halle Open, Germany | 500 Series | Grass | (Brazil) Marcelo Melo | (Italy) Simone Bolelli (Italy) Andrea Vavassori | 7–6^{(7–3)}, 3–6, [10–6] |
| Loss | 27–18 | Sep 2023 | Astana Open, Kazakhstan | 250 Series | Hard (i) | (Croatia) Mate Pavić | (United States) Nathaniel Lammons (United States) Jackson Withrow | 6–7^{(4–7)}, 6–7^{(7–9)} |
| Loss | 27–19 | Apr 2024 | U.S. Men's Clay Court Championships, United States | 250 Series | Clay | (United States) William Blumberg | (Australia) Max Purcell (Australia) Jordan Thompson | 5–7, 1–6 |
| Loss | 27–20 | Jun 2024 | Eastbourne International, United Kingdom | 250 Series | Grass | (Australia) Matthew Ebden | (United Kingdom) Neal Skupski (New Zealand) Michael Venus | 6–4, 6–7^{(2–7)}, [9–11] |
| Win | 28–20 | Aug 2024 | Olympic Games, France | Olympics | Clay | (Australia) Matthew Ebden | (United States) Austin Krajicek (United States) Rajeev Ram | 6–7^{(6–8)}, 7–6^{(7–1)}, [10–8] |
| Win | 29–20 | Oct 2024 | Swiss Indoors, Switzerland | 500 Series | Hard (i) | (United Kingdom) Jamie Murray | (Netherlands) Wesley Koolhof (Croatia) Nikola Mektić | 6–3, 7–5 |
| Win | 30–20 | Nov 2024 | Belgrade Open, Serbia | 250 Series | Hard (i) | (United Kingdom) Jamie Murray | (Croatia) Ivan Dodig (Tunisia) Skander Mansouri | 3–6, 7–6^{(7–5)}, [11–9] |

== ATP Challenger and ITF Futures finals ==
=== Singles: 3 (1 title, 2 runner-ups) ===
| Legend ITF Futures (1–2) |

| Result | W–L | Date | Tournament | Tier | Surface | Opponent | Score |
|---|---|---|---|---|---|---|---|
| Loss | 0–1 | Jun 2011 | Venezuela F4, Maracaibo | Futures | Hard | (Colombia) Eduardo Struvay | 4–6, 6–3, 6–7^{(10–12)} |
| Win | 1–1 | Jul 2011 | Venezuela F6, Caracas | Futures | Hard | (Venezuela) Roberto Maytín | 7–6^{(7–4)}, 4–6, 7–6^{(7–2)} |
| Loss | 1–2 | Apr 2012 | USA F10, Little Rock | Futures | Hard | (United States) Tennys Sandgren | 1–6, 6–7^{(6–8)} |

=== Doubles: 24 (16 titles, 8 runner-ups) ===
| Legend ATP Challenger Tour (11–5) ITF Futures (5–3) | Finals by surface Hard (13–6) Clay (1–2) Grass (2–0) Carpet (0–0) |

| Result | W–L | Date | Tournament | Tier | Surface | Partner | Opponents | Score |
|---|---|---|---|---|---|---|---|---|
| Win | 1–0 | Jun 2011 | Venezuela F4, Maracaibo | Futures | Hard | (Venezuela) Roberto Maytín | (United States) Peter Aarts (United States) Chris Letcher | 6–2, 6–1 |
| Loss | 1–1 | Jun 2011 | Venezuela F5, Coro | Futures | Hard | (Venezuela) Roberto Maytín | (Venezuela) Piero Luisi (Venezuela) Román Recarte | 4–6, 3–6 |
| Loss | 1–2 | Jul 2011 | Venezuela F6, Caracas | Futures | Hard | (Ecuador) Roberto Quiroz | (Venezuela) Piero Luisi (Venezuela) Roberto Maytín | 4–6, 4–6 |
| Win | 2–2 | Aug 2011 | USA F22, Edwardsville | Futures | Hard | (United States) Nicolas Meister | (United States) Devin Britton (United States) Bradley Cox | 6–2, 6–4 |
| Win | 3–2 | Oct 2011 | Australia F10, Port Pirie | Futures | Hard | (Australia) Robert McKenzie | (New Zealand) G.D. Jones (New Zealand) Rubin Statham | 6–7^{(3–7)}, 6–4, [10–8] |
| Win | 4–2 | Nov 2011 | Australia F11, Happy Valley | Futures | Hard | (Australia) Robert McKenzie | (Australia) Jack Schipanski (Australia) Li Tu | 6–4, 6–2 |
| Loss | 4–3 | Nov 2011 | Australia F12, Traralgon | Futures | Hard | (Australia) Dane Propoggia | (Australia) Luke Saville (Australia) Andrew Whittington | 6–4, 4–6, [5–10] |
| Win | 1–0 | Feb 2012 | Burnie, Australia | Challenger | Hard | (Australia) John-Patrick Smith | (India) Divij Sharan (India) Vishnu Vardhan | 6–2, 6–4 |
| Win | 2–0 | Feb 2012 | Caloundra, Australia | Challenger | Hard | (Australia) John-Patrick Smith | (United States) John Paul Fruttero (South Africa) Raven Klaasen | 7–6^{(7–5)}, 6–4 |
| Win | 5–3 | Mar 2012 | USA F8, Costa Mesa | Futures | Hard | (United States) Nicolas Meister | (Australia) Carsten Ball (Germany) Andre Begemann | 6–3, 6–7^{(1–7)}, [17–15] |
| Win | 3–0 | Apr 2012 | León, Mexico | Challenger | Hard | (Australia) John-Patrick Smith | (Mexico) César Ramírez (Mexico) Bruno Rodríguez | 6–3, 6–3 |
| Loss | 3–1 | Jun 2012 | Prostějov, Czech Republic | Challenger | Clay | (Australia) Colin Ebelthite | (Chinese Taipei) Hsieh Cheng-peng (Chinese Taipei) Lee Hsin-han | 5–7, 5–7 |
| Loss | 3–2 | Jul 2012 | Winnetka, USA | Challenger | Hard | (Australia) John-Patrick Smith | (United States) Devin Britton (United States) Jeff Dadamo | 6–1, 2–6, [6–10] |
| Win | 4–2 | Jul 2012 | Lexington, USA | Challenger | Hard | (United States) Austin Krajicek | (United States) Tennys Sandgren (United States) Rhyne Williams | 6–1, 7–6^{(7–4)} |
| Loss | 4–3 | Aug 2012 | Vancouver, Canada | Challenger | Hard | (Australia) John-Patrick Smith | (Belgium) Maxime Authom (Belgium) Ruben Bemelmans | 4–6, 2–6 |
| Win | 5–3 | Aug 2012 | Aptos, USA | Challenger | Hard | (South Africa) Rik de Voest | (Australia) Chris Guccione (Germany) Frank Moser | 6–7^{(5–7)}, 6–1, [10–4] |
| Loss | 5–4 | Sep 2012 | Istanbul, Turkey | Challenger | Hard | (Spain) Adrián Menéndez Maceiras | (Slovakia) Karol Beck (Czech Republic) Lukáš Dlouhý | 6–3, 2–6, [6–10] |
| Win | 6–4 | Oct 2012 | Belém, Brazil | Challenger | Hard | (Australia) John-Patrick Smith | (United States) Nicholas Monroe (Germany) Simon Stadler | 6–3, 6–2 |
| Win | 7–4 | Nov 2012 | Charlottesville, USA | Challenger | Hard (i) | (Australia) John-Patrick Smith | (United States) Jarmere Jenkins (United States) Jack Sock | 7–5, 6–1 |
| Win | 8–4 | Jun 2013 | Nottingham, United Kingdom | Challenger | Grass | (United Kingdom) Jamie Murray | (United Kingdom) Ken Skupski (United Kingdom) Neal Skupski | 6–2, 6–7^{(3–7)}, [10–6] |
| Win | 9–4 | May 2023 | Aix-en-Provence, France | Challenger | Clay | (Australia) Jason Kubler | (Portugal) Nuno Borges (Portugal) Francisco Cabral | 6–7^{(5–7)}, 6–4, [10–7] |
| Loss | 9–5 | May 2023 | Turin, Italy | Challenger | Clay (Note: The final itself was played on indoor hard due to rain.) | (United States) Nathaniel Lammons | (Kazakhstan) Andrey Golubev (Ukraine) Denys Molchanov | 6–7^{(4–7)}, 7–6^{(8–6)}, [5–10] |
| Win | 10–5 | Jun 2024 | Nottingham, United Kingdom | Challenger | Grass | (United Kingdom) Marcus Willis | (France) Harold Mayot (Australia) Luke Saville | 6–1, 6–7^{(1–7)}, [10–7] |
| Win | 11–5 | Aug 2024 | Cary, USA | Challenger | Hard | (Australia) John-Patrick Smith | (Greece) Petros Tsitsipas (Argentina) Federico Agustín Gómez | walkover |

== Performance timelines ==
Key
| W | F | SF | QF | #R | RR | Q# | P# | DNQ | A | Z# | PO | G | S | B | NMS | NTI | P | NH |

(W) winner; (F) finalist; (SF) semifinalist; (QF) quarterfinalist; (#R) rounds 4, 3, 2, 1; (RR) round-robin stage; (Q#) qualification round; (P#) preliminary round; (DNQ) did not qualify; (A) absent; (Z#) Davis/Fed Cup Zonal Group (with number indication) or (PO) play-off; (G) gold, (S) silver or (B) bronze Olympic/Paralympic medal; (NMS) not a Masters tournament; (NTI) not a Tier I tournament; (P) postponed; (NH) not held; (SR) strike rate (events won / competed); (W–L) win–loss record.
To avoid confusion and double counting, these charts are updated at the conclusion of a tournament or when the player's participation has ended.

=== Doubles ===
Current through the 2026 Australian Open.

| Tournament | 2011 | 2012 | 2013 | 2014 | 2015 | 2016 | 2017 | 2018 | 2019 | 2020 | 2021 | 2022 | 2023 | 2024 | 2025 | 2026 | SR | W–L |
|---|---|---|---|---|---|---|---|---|---|---|---|---|---|---|---|---|---|---|
Grand Slam tournaments
| Australian Open | A | A | 2R | 2R | 3R | 2R | W | 2R | F | 3R | 3R | QF | QF | 2R | 2R | 1R | 1 / 14 | 29–13 |
| French Open | A | A | 2R | 3R | 3R | 2R | 1R | QF | 3R | 2R | 2R | 1R | 3R | 2R | QF | 2R | 0 / 14 | 20–14 |
| Wimbledon | A | 1R | 1R | 3R | F | QF | SF | 1R | QF | NH | 1R | QF | 3R | 2R | 1R | 1R | 0 / 14 | 23–14 |
| US Open | A | A | QF | 1R | F | 2R | SF | 2R | 2R | 2R | SF | 1R | 1R | 1R | 2R | | 0 / 13 | 21–12 |
| Win–loss | 0–0 | 0–1 | 5–4 | 5–4 | 14–4 | 6–4 | 14–3 | 5–4 | 11–4 | 4–3 | 7–4 | 6–4 | 7–4 | 3–4 | 5–4 | 1–3 | 1 / 55 | 95–54 |
ATP Finals
| ATP Finals | Did not qualify | | | | RR | W | W | RR | DNQ | RR | Did not qualify | | | | | | 2 / 5 | 10–7 |
ATP Tour Masters 1000
| Indian Wells Masters | A | A | A | 1R | 2R | 1R | QF | 1R | 2R | NH | W | 1R | 2R | 2R | 2R | 1R | 1 / 12 | 12–11 |
| Miami Masters | A | A | A | 1R | 2R | 1R | 2R | 2R | 1R | NH | A | 1R | 2R | 1R | 2R | 2R | 0 / 11 | 6–11 |
| Monte-Carlo Masters | A | A | A | A | 1R | QF | QF | 2R | 2R | NH | 1R | 2R | A | A | 1R | A | 0 / 8 | 5–8 |
| Madrid Masters | A | A | A | 1R | QF | QF | QF | 2R | 2R | NH | 1R | 1R | A | 2R | 1R | A | 0 / 10 | 7–10 |
| Rome Masters | A | A | A | A | QF | 1R | SF | QF | QF | SF | SF | 1R | 1R | 1R | 2R | A | 0 / 11 | 13–11 |
| Canada Masters | A | A | A | 2R | QF | QF | QF | W | 2R | NH | 1R | F | 1R | A | 2R | A | 1 / 10 | 14–9 |
| Cincinnati Masters | A | A | A | 1R | 2R | 1R | QF | QF | QF | 1R | 2R | 1R | QF | A | 1R | A | 0 / 11 | 5–11 |
| Shanghai Masters | A | A | SF | 1R | 2R | F | W | 2R | 2R | NH | | | 1R | QF | 2R | | 1 / 10 | 15–9 |
| Paris Masters | A | A | 1R | A | 2R | W | QF | 2R | 1R | QF | SF | 2R | A | 1R | QF | | 1 / 11 | 12–10 |
| Win–loss | 0–0 | 0–0 | 3–2 | 1–6 | 8–9 | 14–8 | 12–8 | 7–7 | 8–9 | 4–3 | 11–6 | 5–7 | 4–6 | 4–6 | 3–5 | 1–2 | 4 / 94 | 89–90 |
National representation
| Summer Olympics | NH | A | Not Held | | | 1R | Not Held | | | | 1R | NH | | G | NH | | 1 / 3 | 5–2 |
| Davis Cup | A | A | A | A | A | 1R | SF | 1R | QF | RR | | A | A | A | 2R | | 0 / 6 | 8–7 |
| ATP Cup | Not Held | | | | | | | | | SF | RR | RR | Not Held | | | | 0 / 3 | 6–3 |
| Win–loss | 0–0 | 0–0 | 0–0 | 0–0 | 0–0 | 1–2 | 2–1 | 1–1 | 2–2 | 3–2 | 2–3 | 2–1 | 0–0 | 0–0 | 0–0 | 0–0 | 0 / 10 | 13–12 |
Career statistics
| ATP Titles | 0 | 0 | 3 | 1 | 2 | 5 | 5 | 3 | 1 | 3 | 2 | 1 | 1 | 3 | 0 | 0 | 30 | |
| ATP Finals | 0 | 0 | 4 | 4 | 8 | 6 | 5 | 3 | 2 | 3 | 4 | 1 | 2 | 5 | 0 | 0 | 50 | |
| Overall win–loss | 0–0 | 1–2 | 37–22 | 36–27 | 45–27 | 46–23 | 46–19 | 21–20 | 31–23 | 25–15 | 36–20 | 28–26 | 24–26 | 35–25 | 23–26 | 7–14 | 441–315 | |
| Win % | – | 33% | 63% | 57% | 63% | 67% | 71% | 51% | 57% | 60% | 64% | 52% | 48% | 58% | 47% | 33% | 58.33% | |
| Year-end ranking | 359 | 76 | 29 | 43 | 8 | 9 | 4 | 23 | 26 | 28 | 13 | 37 | 39 | 35 | 50 | | | |

=== Mixed doubles ===
| Tournament | 2013 | 2014 | 2015 | 2016 | 2017 | 2018 | 2019 | 2020 | 2021 | 2022 | 2023 | 2024 | 2025 | 2026 | SR | W–L |
|---|---|---|---|---|---|---|---|---|---|---|---|---|---|---|---|---|
| Australian Open | A | 2R | QF | 2R | 1R | 2R | 1R | A | 1R | SF | 1R | 1R | W | W | 2 / 12 | 18–10 |
| French Open | A | 1R | QF | 1R | 1R | 2R | QF | NH | 1R | SF | 2R | 2R | A | A | 0 / 10 | 10–10 |
| Wimbledon | QF | 3R | 2R | 1R | 3R | 2R | 3R | NH | SF | QF | 1R | A | A | 1R | 0 / 11 | 12–11 |
| US Open | 2R | QF | 2R | A | A | SF | 1R | NH | 1R | W | 1R | 2R | A | A | 1 / 9 | 13–8 |
| Win–loss | 4–2 | 3–4 | 5–4 | 1–3 | 2–3 | 6–4 | 3–4 | 0–0 | 3–4 | 13–3 | 1–2 | 1–2 | 5–0 | 5–1 | 3 / 42 | 53–39 |
National representation
| Summer Olympics | Not Held | | | 1R | Not Held | | | | B | NH | | A | NH | | 0 / 2 | 2–2 |

== Amateur tennis ==
Peers went to Mentone Grammar and led the 1STS team to two premierships, his first when he was in Year 7 in 2001 and his second when he was in Year 12 in 2006.

Peers played varsity tennis for the Middle Tennessee State University Blue Raiders before transferring school to play for Baylor University Bears. While representing the Blue Raiders John earned all-conference honours from the Sun Belt in 2009 and 2010 in singles and doubles. Peers also received the Sun Belt Conference MVP in 2009. During his time at Baylor University John was named All-Big 12 in both singles and doubles and received ITA All-American honours in doubles. Paired with Roberto Maytín they finished the season ranked No. 5 in the National doubles ITA rankings Peers also earned ITA Texas Region Arthur Ashe Sportsmanship Award.
