= Raven Klaasen =

South African tennis player (born 1982)

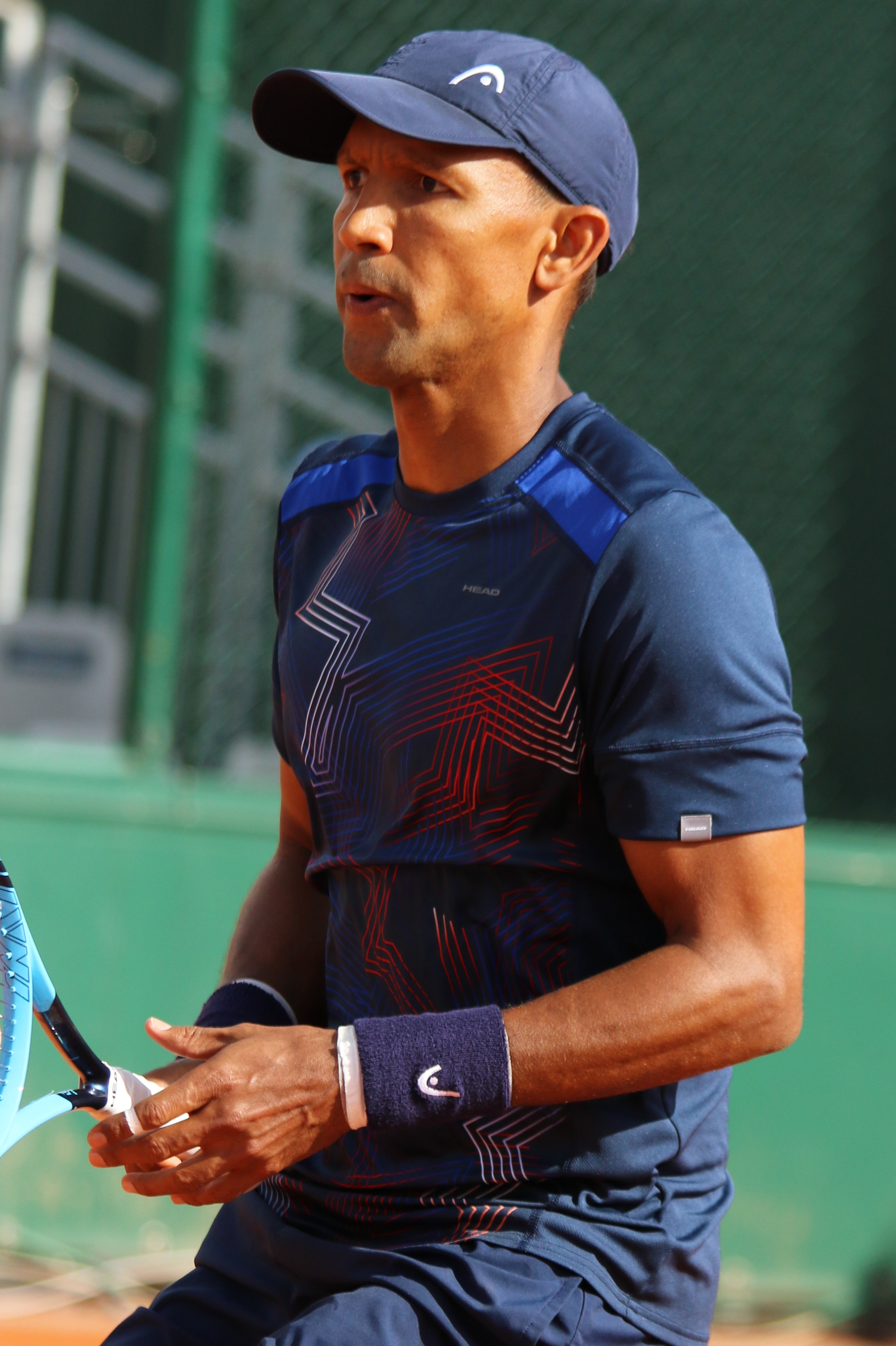
- Klaasen at the French Open 2019
- Country (sports): South Africa
- Residence: King William's Town, South Africa
- Born: 16 October 1982 (age 43) Cape Town, South Africa
- Height: 1.78 m (5 ft 10 in)
- Turned pro: 2002
- Retired: 2023
- Plays: Right-handed (two-handed backhand)
- Prize money: $4,014,060

Singles
- Career record: 7–5
- Career titles: 0
- Highest ranking: No. 208 (24 October 2011)

Grand Slam singles results
- Australian Open: Q1 (2012)
- US Open: Q2 (2009)

Doubles
- Career record: 321–230
- Career titles: 19
- Highest ranking: No. 7 (5 August 2019)

Grand Slam doubles results
- Australian Open: F (2014)
- French Open: 3R (2018)
- Wimbledon: F (2018)
- US Open: QF (2014)

Other doubles tournaments
- Tour Finals: F (2016, 2019)

Grand Slam mixed doubles results
- Australian Open: QF (2017)
- French Open: 2R (2014)
- Wimbledon: 3R (2015, 2021)
- US Open: 2R (2014, 2015)

Raven Klaasen (/ˈklɑːsən/ KLAH-sən; born 16 October 1982) is a former South African professional tennis player who specialises in doubles.

== Professional career ==
He achieved his career-high doubles ranking of world No. 7 in August 2019, and has won 19 doubles titles on the ATP Tour, including two at Masters 1000 level. Klaasen is a two-time Grand Slam finalist, having finished runner-up at the 2014 Australian Open alongside Eric Butorac, and the 2018 Wimbledon Championships with Michael Venus. He was also runner up at the ATP Finals in both 2016 and 2019, partnering Rajeev Ram and Venus respectively.

In singles, Klaasen has a career-high ranking of world No. 208, achieved in October 2011. He has represented South Africa in the Davis Cup since 2009, and has a win–loss record of 13–4. He reached his 300th match win at the 2022 Estoril Open with Ben McLachlan defeating Hugo Nys/Jan Zieliński in the round of 16.

== Significant finals ==
=== Grand Slam finals ===
==== Doubles: 2 (2 runners-up) ====
Result	Year	Championship	Surface	Partner	Opponents	Score
Loss	2014	Australian Open	Hard	(United States) Eric Butorac	(Poland) Łukasz Kubot (Sweden) Robert Lindstedt	3–6, 3–6
Loss	2018	Wimbledon	Grass	(New Zealand) Michael Venus	(United States) Mike Bryan (United States) Jack Sock	3–6, 7–6^{(9–7)}, 3–6, 7–5, 5–7

=== Year-end championships ===
==== Doubles: 2 (2 runners-up) ====
Result	Year	Championship	Surface	Partner	Opponents	Score
Loss	2016	ATP Finals, London	Hard (i)	(United States) Rajeev Ram	(Finland) Henri Kontinen (Australia) John Peers	6 –2, 1–6, [8–10]
Loss	2019	ATP Finals, London	Hard (i)	(New Zealand) Michael Venus	(France) Pierre-Hugues Herbert (France) Nicolas Mahut	3–6, 4–6

=== Masters 1000 finals ===
==== Doubles: 5 (2 titles, 3 runners-up) ====
Result	Year	Tournament	Surface	Partner	Opponents	Score
Win	2015	Shanghai Masters	Hard	(Brazil) Marcelo Melo	(Italy) Simone Bolelli (Italy) Fabio Fognini	6–3, 6–3
Loss	2016	Miami Open	Hard	(United States) Rajeev Ram	(France) Pierre-Hugues Herbert (France) Nicolas Mahut	7–5, 1–6, [7–10]
Win	2017	Indian Wells Masters	Hard	(United States) Rajeev Ram	(Poland) Łukasz Kubot (Brazil) Marcelo Melo	6–7^{(1–7)}, 6–4, [10–8]
Loss	2018	Canadian Open	Hard	(New Zealand) Michael Venus	(Finland) Henri Kontinen (Australia) John Peers	2–6, 7–6^{(9–7)}, [6–10]
Loss	2019	Rome Masters	Clay	(New Zealand) Michael Venus	(Colombia) Juan Sebastián Cabal (Colombia) Robert Farah	1–6, 3–6

== ATP career finals ==
=== Doubles: 42 (19 titles, 23 runner-ups) ===
Legend Grand Slam tournaments (0–2) ATP World Tour Finals (0–2) ATP World Tour Masters 1000 (2–3) ATP World Tour 500 Series (6–3) ATP World Tour 250 Series (11–13)	Finals by surface Hard (15–15) Clay (1–3) Grass (3–5)	Finals by setting Outdoor (13–17) Indoor (6–6)

Result	W–L	Date	Tournament	Tier	Surface	Partner	Opponents	Score
Loss	0–1	Feb 2013	Open Sud de France, France	250 Series	Hard (i)	(Sweden) Johan Brunström	(France) Marc Gicquel (France) Michaël Llodra	3–6, 6–3, [9–11]
Win	1–1	May 2013	Open de Nice, France	250 Series	Clay	(Sweden) Johan Brunström	(Colombia) Juan Sebastián Cabal (Colombia) Robert Farah	6–3, 6–2
Win	2–1	Sep 2013	Moselle Open, France	250 Series	Hard (i)	(Sweden) Johan Brunström	(France) Nicolas Mahut (France) Jo-Wilfried Tsonga	6–4, 7–6^{(7–5)}
Win	3–1	Sep 2013	Malaysian Open, Malaysia	250 Series	Hard (i)	(United States) Eric Butorac	(Uruguay) Pablo Cuevas (Argentina) Horacio Zeballos	6–2, 6–4
Loss	3–2	Jan 2014	Australian Open, Australia	Grand Slam	Hard	(United States) Eric Butorac	(Poland) Łukasz Kubot (Sweden) Robert Lindstedt	3–6, 3–6
Win	4–2	Feb 2014	U.S. National Indoor Championships, United States	250 Series	Hard (i)	(United States) Eric Butorac	(United States) Bob Bryan (United States) Mike Bryan	6–4, 6–4
Win	5–2	Oct 2014	Stockholm Open, Sweden	250 Series	Hard (i)	(United States) Eric Butorac	(Philippines) Treat Huey (United States) Jack Sock	6–4, 6–3
Loss	5–3	Jan 2015	Chennai Open, India	250 Series	Hard	(India) Leander Paes	(Chinese Taipei) Lu Yen-hsun (United Kingdom) Jonathan Marray	6–3, 7–6^{(7–4)}
Win	6–3	Jan 2015	Auckland Open, New Zealand	250 Series	Hard	(India) Leander Paes	(United Kingdom) Dominic Inglot (Romania) Florin Mergea	7–6^{(7–1)}, 6–4
Loss	6–4	Feb 2015	Delray Beach Open, United States	250 Series	Hard	(India) Leander Paes	(United States) Bob Bryan (United States) Mike Bryan	3–6, 6–3, [6–10]
Loss	6–5	May 2015	Geneva Open, Switzerland	250 Series	Clay	(Chinese Taipei) Lu Yen-hsun	(Colombia) Juan Sebastián Cabal (Colombia) Robert Farah	5–7, 6–4, [7–10]
Win	7–5	Jun 2015	Halle Open, Germany	500 Series	Grass	(United States) Rajeev Ram	(India) Rohan Bopanna (Romania) Florin Mergea	7–6^{(7–5)}, 6–2
Loss	7–6	Oct 2015	Malaysian Open, Malaysia	250 Series	Hard (i)	(United States) Rajeev Ram	(Philippines) Treat Huey (Finland) Henri Kontinen	6–7^{(4–7)}, 2–6
Win	8–6	Oct 2015	Japan Open, Japan	500 Series	Hard	(Brazil) Marcelo Melo	(Colombia) Juan Sebastián Cabal (Colombia) Robert Farah	7–6^{(7–5)}, 3–6, [10–7]
Win	9–6	Oct 2015	Shanghai Masters, China	Masters 1000	Hard	(Brazil) Marcelo Melo	(Italy) Simone Bolelli (Italy) Fabio Fognini	6–3, 6–3
Loss	9–7	Apr 2016	Miami Open, United States	Masters 1000	Hard	(United States) Rajeev Ram	(France) Pierre-Hugues Herbert (France) Nicolas Mahut	7–5, 1–6, [7–10]
Loss	9–8	May 2016	Geneva Open, Switzerland	250 Series	Clay	(United States) Rajeev Ram	(United States) Steve Johnson (United States) Sam Querrey	4–6, 1–6
Loss	9–9	Jun 2016	Rosmalen Grass Court Championships, Netherlands	250 Series	Grass	(United Kingdom) Dominic Inglot	(Croatia) Mate Pavić (New Zealand) Michael Venus	3–6, 6–3, [11–9]
Win	10–9	Jun 2016	Halle Open, Germany (2)	500 Series	Grass	(United States) Rajeev Ram	(Poland) Łukasz Kubot (Austria) Alexander Peya	7–6^{(7–5)}, 6–2
Win	11–9	Oct 2016	Chengdu Open, China	250 Series	Hard	(United States) Rajeev Ram	(Spain) Pablo Carreño Busta (Poland) Mariusz Fyrstenberg	7−6^{(7–2)}, 7−5
Loss	11–10	Oct 2016	Japan Open, Japan	500 Series	Hard	(United States) Rajeev Ram	(Spain) Marcel Granollers (Poland) Marcin Matkowski	2–6, 6–7^{(4–7)}
Loss	11–11	Nov 2016	ATP Finals, United Kingdom	Tour Finals	Hard (i)	(United States) Rajeev Ram	(Finland) Henri Kontinen (Australia) John Peers	6–2, 1–6, [8–10]
Win	12–11	Feb 2017	Delray Beach Open, United States	250 Series	Hard	(United States) Rajeev Ram	(Philippines) Treat Huey (Belarus) Max Mirnyi	7–5, 7–5
Win	13–11	Mar 2017	Indian Wells Masters, United States	Masters 1000	Hard	(United States) Rajeev Ram	(Poland) Łukasz Kubot (Brazil) Marcelo Melo	6–7^{(1–7)}, 6–4, [10–8]
Loss	13–12	Jun 2017	Rosmalen Grass Court Championships, Netherlands	250 Series	Grass	(United States) Rajeev Ram	(Poland) Łukasz Kubot (Brazil) Marcelo Melo	3–6, 4–6
Won	14–12	Feb 2018	Open 13, France	250 Series	Hard (i)	(New Zealand) Michael Venus	(New Zealand) Marcus Daniell (United Kingdom) Dominic Inglot	6–7^{(2–7)}, 6–3, [10–4]
Loss	14–13	Jun 2018	Rosmalen Grass Court Championships, Netherlands	250 Series	Grass	(New Zealand) Michael Venus	(United Kingdom) Dominic Inglot (Croatia) Franko Škugor	6–7^{(3–7)}, 5–7
Loss	14–14	Jul 2018	Wimbledon Championships, United Kingdom	Grand Slam	Grass	(New Zealand) Michael Venus	(United States) Mike Bryan (United States) Jack Sock	3–6, 7–6^{(9–7)}, 3–6, 7–5, 5–7
Loss	14–15	Aug 2018	Canadian Open, Canada	Masters 1000	Hard	(New Zealand) Michael Venus	(Finland) Henri Kontinen (Australia) John Peers	2–6, 7–6^{(9–7)}, [6–10]
Loss	14–16	Oct 2018	Japan Open, Japan	500 Series	Hard (i)	(New Zealand) Michael Venus	(Japan) Ben McLachlan (Germany) Jan-Lennard Struff	4–6, 5–7
Loss	14–17	Jan 2019	Auckland Open, New Zealand	250 Series	Hard	(New Zealand) Michael Venus	(Japan) Ben McLachlan (Germany) Jan-Lennard Struff	3–6, 4–6
Loss	14–18	May 2019	Italian Open, Italy	Masters 1000	Clay	(New Zealand) Michael Venus	(Colombia) Juan Sebastián Cabal (Colombia) Robert Farah	1–6, 3–6
Win	15–18	Jun 2019	Halle Open, Germany (3)	500 Series	Grass	(New Zealand) Michael Venus	(Poland) Łukasz Kubot (Brazil) Marcelo Melo	4–6, 6–3, [10–4]
Win	16–18	Aug 2019	Washington Open, United States	500 Series	Hard	(New Zealand) Michael Venus	(Netherlands) Jean-Julien Rojer (Romania) Horia Tecău	3–6, 6–3, [10–2]
Loss	16–19	Nov 2019	ATP Finals, United Kingdom	Tour Finals	Hard (i)	(New Zealand) Michael Venus	(France) Pierre-Hugues Herbert (France) Nicolas Mahut	3–6, 4–6
Loss	16–20	Feb 2020	Dubai Tennis Championships, United Arab Emirates	500 Series	Hard	(Austria) Oliver Marach	(Australia) John Peers (New Zealand) Michael Venus	3–6, 2–6
Win	17–20	Oct 2020	Cologne Championship, Germany	250 Series	Hard (i)	(Japan) Ben McLachlan	(Germany) Kevin Krawietz (Germany) Andreas Mies	6–2, 6–4
Win	18–20	Jul 2021	Washington Open, United States (2)	500 Series	Hard	(Japan) Ben McLachlan	(United Kingdom) Neal Skupski (New Zealand) Michael Venus	7–6^{(7–4)}, 6–4
Loss	18–21	Feb 2022	Open 13, France	250 Series	Hard (i)	(Japan) Ben McLachlan	(Ukraine) Denys Molchanov (Russia) Andrey Rublev	6–4, 5–7, [7–10]
Loss	18–22	Jul 2022	Hall of Fame Open, United States	250 Series	Grass	(Brazil) Marcelo Melo	(United States) William Blumberg (United States) Steve Johnson	4–6, 5–7
Loss	18–23	Aug 2022	Los Cabos Open, Mexico	250 Series	Hard	(Brazil) Marcelo Melo	(United States) William Blumberg (Serbia) Miomir Kecmanović	0–6, 1–6
Win	19–23	Oct 2022	Korea Open, South Korea	250 Series	Hard	(United States) Nathaniel Lammons	(Colombia) Nicolás Barrientos (Mexico) Miguel Ángel Reyes-Varela	6–1, 7–5

== Doubles performance timeline ==
Key
W	F	SF	QF	#R	RR	Q#	P#	DNQ	A	Z#	PO	G	S	B	NMS	NTI	P	NH

(W) winner; (F) finalist; (SF) semifinalist; (QF) quarterfinalist; (#R) rounds 4, 3, 2, 1; (RR) round-robin stage; (Q#) qualification round; (P#) preliminary round; (DNQ) did not qualify; (A) absent; (Z#) Davis/Fed Cup Zonal Group (with number indication) or (PO) play-off; (G) gold, (S) silver or (B) bronze Olympic/Paralympic medal; (NMS) not a Masters tournament; (NTI) not a Tier I tournament; (P) postponed; (NH) not held; (SR) strike rate (events won / competed); (W–L) win–loss record.
To avoid confusion and double counting, these charts are updated at the conclusion of a tournament or when the player's participation has ended.

Current through the 2023 French Open.

Tournament	2009	2010	2011	2012	2013	2014	2015	2016	2017	2018	2019	2020	2021	2022	2023	SR	W–L
Grand Slam tournaments
Australian Open	A	A	A	A	A	F	2R	QF	2R	1R	QF	2R	A	3R	3R	0 / 9	18–9
French Open	A	A	A	1R	1R	2R	1R	2R	2R	3R	1R	1R	2R	2R	1R	0 / 12	7–12
Wimbledon	A	A	A	Q1	1R	3R	2R	SF	3R	F	SF	NH	QF	2R	A	0 / 9	22–9
US Open	A	A	A	3R	1R	QF	3R	2R	1R	2R	2R	1R	2R	2R	A	0 / 11	12–11
Win–loss	0–0	0–0	0–0	2–2	0–3	11–4	4–4	9–4	4–4	8–4	8–4	1–3	5–3	5–4	2–2	0 / 41	59–41
Year-end championship
ATP Finals	Did not qualify							F	RR	RR	F	Did not qualify				0 / 4	7–7
ATP World Tour Masters 1000
Indian Wells Masters	A	A	A	A	A	1R	2R	1R	W	2R	QF	NH	1R	1R	A	1 / 8	9–7
Miami Open	A	A	A	A	A	2R	1R	F	1R	QF	1R	NH	1R	1R	A	0 / 8	7–8
Monte-Carlo Masters	A	A	A	A	A	1R	2R	1R	2R	QF	1R	NH	QF	A	A	0 / 7	4–7
Madrid Open	A	A	A	A	A	1R	A	2R	2R	QF	2R	NH	2R	1R	A	0 / 6	5–6
Italian Open	A	A	A	A	A	A	A	1R	QF	2R	F	1R	2R	2R	A	0 / 7	8–7
Canadian Open	A	A	A	A	A	1R	1R	QF	SF	F	A	NH	1R	A	A	0 / 6	6–6
Cincinnati Masters	A	A	A	A	A	2R	2R	QF	2R	2R	QF	2R	1R	A	A	0 / 8	6–8
Shanghai Masters	A	A	A	A	A	2R	W	2R	QF	QF	QF	Not Held			A	1 / 6	9–5
Paris Masters	A	A	A	A	2R	QF	QF	2R	2R	QF	1R	1R	1R	A	A	0 / 9	6–9
Win–loss	0–0	0–0	0–0	0–0	1–1	5–8	9–6	6–9	8–8	14–9	11–8	1–3	4–8	1–4	0–0	2 / 66	60–64
National representation
Davis Cup	Z1	Z1	PO	PO	Z1	Z2	Z2	Z2	Z2	Z1	Z2	Z1	WG2	WG2	WG2	0 / 0	13–7
Career statistics
Titles	0	0	0	0	3	2	4	2	2	1	2	1	1	1	0	19	
Finals	0	0	0	0	4	3	8	7	3	5	5	2	1	4	0	42	
Overall win–loss	0–1	1–1	0–1	9–8	26–16	35–25	42–23	38–23	30–21	40–26	39–22	15–14	19–23	24–23	3–3	321–230	
Year-end ranking	363	187	112	73	44	20	20	12	25	15	8	18	26	55	337	58%	
