= 2015 Barcelona Open Banc Sabadell – Singles =

Singles
- 2015 Barcelona Open Banc Sabadell

Final
- Champion: (Japan) Kei Nishikori
- Runner-up: (Spain) Pablo Andújar
- Score: 6–4, 6–4

Details
- Draw: 48 (6 Q / 4 WC )
- Seeds: 16

Events
Singles	Doubles
← 2014 ·	Barcelona Open	· 2016 →

Defending champion Kei Nishikori successfully defended his title, defeating Pablo Andújar in the final, 6–4, 6–4, to win the singles title at the 2015 Barcelona Open.

== Seeds ==
All seeds receive a bye into the second round.

1. (Japan) Kei Nishikori (champion)
2. (Spain) Rafael Nadal (third round)
3. (Spain) David Ferrer (semifinals)
4. (Croatia) Marin Čilić (second round)
5. (Spain) Feliciano López (third round)
6. (France) Jo-Wilfried Tsonga (second round)
7. (Spain) Roberto Bautista Agut (quarterfinals)
8. (Latvia) Ernests Gulbis (second round)

9. (Spain) Tommy Robredo (quarterfinals)
10. (Uruguay) Pablo Cuevas (third round)
11. (Argentina) Leonardo Mayer (second round)
12. (Germany) Philipp Kohlschreiber (quarterfinals)
13. (Italy) Fabio Fognini (quarterfinals)
14. (Slovakia) Martin Kližan (semifinals)
15. (Colombia) Santiago Giraldo (third round)
16. (Australia) Nick Kyrgios (second round)

Click on the seed number of a player to go to their draw section.

== Draw ==
=== Key ===
- Q = Qualifier
- WC = Wild card
- LL = Lucky loser
- Alt = Alternate
- SE = Special exempt
- PR = Protected ranking
- ITF = ITF entry
- JE = Junior exempt
- w/o = Walkover
- r = Retired
- d = Defaulted
- SR = Special ranking

=== Finals ===
Quarterfinals
1	(Japan) Kei Nishikori	6	3	6
7	(Spain) Roberto Bautista Agut	2	6	1
14	(Slovakia) Martin Kližan	7^{7}	6
9	(Spain) Tommy Robredo	6^{5}	4
12	(Germany) Philipp Kohlschreiber	3	6^{5}
3	(Spain) David Ferrer	6	7^{7}
(Spain) Pablo Andújar	6	6
13	(Italy) Fabio Fognini	1	3

Semifinals
1	(Japan) Kei Nishikori	6	6
14	(Slovakia) Martin Kližan	1	2
3	(Spain) David Ferrer	6^{6}	3
(Spain) Pablo Andújar	7^{8}	6

Final
1	(Japan) Kei Nishikori	6	6
(Spain) Pablo Andújar	4	4

=== Top half ===
==== Section 1 ====
First round
(Russia) T Gabashvili	7	6
(Spain) P Carreño Busta	5	4
LL	(France) K de Schepper	4	6	3
(Portugal) J Sousa	6	3	6
(Germany) J-L Struff	7	5	2
WC	(Spain) R Carballés Baena	5	7	6
(Brazil) T Bellucci	6	6
Q	(Japan) Y Sugita	1	0

Second round
1	(Japan) K Nishikori	6	6
(Russia) T Gabashvili	3	4
(Portugal) J Sousa	3	6	1
15	(Colombia) S Giraldo	6	3	6
10	(Uruguay) P Cuevas	6	7
WC	(Spain) R Carballés Baena	4	5
(Brazil) T Bellucci	3	4
7	(Spain) R Bautista Agut	6	6

Third round
1	(Japan) K Nishikori	6	6
15	(Colombia) S Giraldo	2	1
10	(Uruguay) P Cuevas	6^{5}	2
7	(Spain) R Bautista Agut	7^{7}	6

Quarterfinals
1	(Japan) K Nishikori	6	3	6
7	(Spain) R Bautista Agut	2	6	1

==== Section 2 ====
First round
(Dominican Republic) V Estrella Burgos	6	7^{7}
(Austria) D Thiem	3	6^{3}
(Argentina) J Mónaco	7	6
(Colombia) A González	5	1
(Brazil) J Souza	1	0
(Kazakhstan) M Kukushkin	6	6
(Australia) M Matosevic	2	3
(Spain) M Granollers	6	6

Second round
4	(Croatia) M Čilić	4	4
(Dominican Republic) V Estrella Burgos	6	6
(Argentina) J Mónaco	7	0	3
14	(Slovakia) M Kližan	5	6	6
9	(Spain) T Robredo	6	6
(Kazakhstan) M Kukushkin	3	2
(Spain) M Granollers	6	6
6	(France) J-W Tsonga	4	2

Third round
(Dominican Republic) V Estrella Burgos	4	3
14	(Slovakia) M Kližan	6	6
9	(Spain) T Robredo	6	6
(Spain) M Granollers	2	2

Quarterfinals
14	(Slovakia) M Kližan	7^{7}	6
9	(Spain) T Robredo	6^{5}	4

=== Bottom half ===
==== Section 3 ====
First round
(France) B Paire	6	6
Q	(Spain) J Munar	2	2
Q	(Hungary) M Fucsovics	4	2
(Russia) A Kuznetsov	6	6
Q	(Netherlands) T de Bakker	7^{7}	5	4
WC	(Sweden) E Ymer	6^{5}	7	6
(Lithuania) R Berankis	6	4	5
WC	(Spain) A Montañés	1	6	7

Second round
8	(Latvia) E Gulbis	6	2	3
(France) B Paire	1	6	6
(Russia) A Kuznetsov	6^{1}	3
12	(Germany) P Kohlschreiber	7^{7}	6
16/WC	(Australia) N Kyrgios	6	5	6^{7}
WC	(Sweden) E Ymer	2	7	7^{9}
WC	(Spain) A Montañés	2	3
3	(Spain) D Ferrer	6	6

Third round
(France) B Paire	4	6^{6}
12	(Germany) P Kohlschreiber	6	7^{8}
WC	(Sweden) E Ymer	3	4
3	(Spain) D Ferrer	6	6

Quarterfinals
12	(Germany) P Kohlschreiber	3	6^{5}
3	(Spain) D Ferrer	6	7^{7}

==== Section 4 ====
First round
(Turkey) M İlhan	7^{7}	3	6
Q	(United Kingdom) J Ward	6^{2}	6	1
(Spain) P Andújar	6	6
(Spain) A Ramos Viñolas	4	1
Q	(Russia) A Rublev	7^{7}	6
(Spain) F Verdasco	6^{4}	3
(Italy) P Lorenzi	0^{r}
(Spain) N Almagro	3

Second round
5	(Spain) F López	6	5	7^{7}
(Turkey) M İlhan	2	7	6^{5}
(Spain) P Andújar	2	6	6
11	(Argentina) L Mayer	6	1	2
13	(Italy) F Fognini	3	6	6
Q	(Russia) A Rublev	6	4	1
(Spain) N Almagro	3	1
2	(Spain) R Nadal	6	6

Third round
5	(Spain) F López	3	4
(Spain) P Andújar	6	6
13	(Italy) F Fognini	6	7^{8}
2	(Spain) R Nadal	4	6^{6}

Quarterfinals
(Spain) P Andújar	6	6
13	(Italy) F Fognini	1	3

== Qualifying ==
=== Seeds ===
1. (United Kingdom) James Ward (qualified)
2. (Slovakia) Norbert Gombos (qualifying competition)
3. (Netherlands) Thiemo de Bakker (qualified)
4. (France) Kenny de Schepper (qualifying competition, lucky loser)
5. (Japan) Yūichi Sugita (qualified)
6. (Spain) Daniel Muñoz de la Nava (first round, retired)
7. (Hungary) Márton Fucsovics (qualified)
8. (Slovakia) Miloslav Mečíř Jr. (first round)
9. (Czech Republic) Jaroslav Pospíšil (first round)
10. (Germany) Peter Torebko (qualifying competition)
11. (Netherlands) Jesse Huta Galung (first round, retired)
12. (Portugal) Rui Machado (qualifying competition)

=== Qualifiers ===
1. (United Kingdom) James Ward
2. (Russia) Andrey Rublev
3. (Netherlands) Thiemo de Bakker
4. (Hungary) Márton Fucsovics
5. (Japan) Yūichi Sugita
6. (Spain) Jaume Munar

=== Lucky losers ===
1. (France) Kenny de Schepper

=== Qualifying draw ===
==== First qualifier ====
First round
1	(United Kingdom) James Ward	6	5	6
WC	(Spain) Eduard Güell Bartrina	4	7	3
PR	(Spain) Javier Martí	6	6^{3}	4
12	(Portugal) Rui Machado	4	7^{7}	6

Qualifying competition
1	(United Kingdom) James Ward	6	6
12	(Portugal) Rui Machado	2	3

==== Second qualifier ====
First round
2	(Slovakia) Norbert Gombos	7	6
WC	(Spain) David Marrero	5	1
(Russia) Andrey Rublev	6	4
11	(Netherlands) Jesse Huta Galung	3	1^{r}

Qualifying competition
2	(Slovakia) Norbert Gombos	6^{4}	3
(Russia) Andrey Rublev	7^{7}	6

==== Third qualifier ====
First round
3	(Netherlands) Thiemo de Bakker	6	3	6
(Germany) Richard Becker	4	6	3
WC	(Spain) Jaume Pla Malfeito	2	1
10	(Germany) Peter Torebko	6	6

Qualifying competition
3	(Netherlands) Thiemo de Bakker	7	6
10	(Germany) Peter Torebko	5	4

==== Fourth qualifier ====
First round
4	(France) Kenny de Schepper	6	6
(Czech Republic) Marek Michalička	1	2
(Spain) Gerard Granollers	3	4
7	(Hungary) Márton Fucsovics	6	6

Qualifying competition
4	(France) Kenny de Schepper	6	4	6^{2}
7	(Hungary) Márton Fucsovics	4	6	7^{7}

==== Fifth qualifier ====
First round
5	(Japan) Yūichi Sugita	6	6
(Spain) Juan Lizariturry	1	0
(Spain) Oriol Roca Batalla	7	6
8	(Slovakia) Miloslav Mečíř Jr.	5	2

Qualifying competition
5	(Japan) Yūichi Sugita	6	6
(Spain) Oriol Roca Batalla	1	3

==== Sixth qualifier ====
First round
6	(Spain) Daniel Muñoz de la Nava	3	4^{r}
WC	(Spain) Jaume Munar	6	5
(Argentina) Pedro Cachin	6	6^{3}	6
9	(Czech Republic) Jaroslav Pospíšil	4	7^{7}	3

Qualifying competition
WC	(Spain) Jaume Munar	6	7
(Argentina) Pedro Cachin	2	5
