= 2017 Rogers Cup – Men's doubles =

Men's doubles
- 2017 Rogers Cup

Final
- Champions: (France) Pierre-Hugues Herbert (France) Nicolas Mahut
- Runners-up: (India) Rohan Bopanna (Croatia) Ivan Dodig
- Score: 6–4, 3–6, [10–6]

Details
- Draw: 28
- Seeds: 8

Events
| Singles | men | women |
| Doubles | men | women |
- Rogers Cup

Ivan Dodig and Marcelo Melo were the defending champions, but chose not to participate together. Melo played alongside Łukasz Kubot, but lost in the second round to Fabrice Martin and Édouard Roger-Vasselin. Dodig teamed up with Rohan Bopanna, but lost in the final to Pierre-Hugues Herbert and Nicolas Mahut, 4–6, 6–3, [6–10].

== Seeds ==
All seeds received a bye into the second round.

1. (Finland) Henri Kontinen / (Australia) John Peers (quarterfinals)
2. (Poland) Łukasz Kubot / (Brazil) Marcelo Melo (second round)
3. (United Kingdom) Jamie Murray / (Brazil) Bruno Soares (second round)
4. (United States) Bob Bryan / (United States) Mike Bryan (quarterfinals)
5. (France) Pierre-Hugues Herbert / (France) Nicolas Mahut (champions)
6. (South Africa) Raven Klaasen / (United States) Rajeev Ram (semifinals)
7. (India) Rohan Bopanna / (Croatia) Ivan Dodig (final)
8. (Austria) Oliver Marach / (Croatia) Mate Pavić (semifinals)

== Draw ==
Key

- Q = Qualifier
- WC = Wild card
- LL = Lucky loser
- Alt = Alternate
- ITF = ITF entry
- PR = Protected ranking
- SR = Special ranking
- SE = Special exempt
- JE = Junior exempt
- JR = Junior Accelerator Programme entrant
- CO = College Accelerator Programme entrant
- NG = Next Gen Accelerator Program entrant
- w/o = Walkover
- r = Retired
- d = Defaulted

=== Finals ===
Semifinals
8 | (Austria) Oliver Marach (Croatia) Mate Pavić | 5 | 3
5 | (France) Pierre-Hugues Herbert (France) Nicolas Mahut | 7 | 6
7 | (India) Rohan Bopanna (Croatia) Ivan Dodig | 4 | 7^{10} | [11]
6 | (South Africa) Raven Klaasen (United States) Rajeev Ram | 6 | 6^{8} | [9]

Final
5 | (France) Pierre-Hugues Herbert (France) Nicolas Mahut | 6 | 3 | [10]
7 | (India) Rohan Bopanna (Croatia) Ivan Dodig | 4 | 6 | [6]

=== Top half ===
First round
(Netherlands) J-J Rojer (Romania) H Tecău | 7^{9} | 7
(Mexico) S González (United States) D Young | 6^{7} | 5
(Croatia) N Mektić (Pakistan) A-u-H Qureshi | 2 | 7 | [8]
(Colombia) JS Cabal (Spain) P Carreño Busta | 6 | 5 | [10]
(Argentina) JM del Potro (Bulgaria) G Dimitrov | 6 | 6
(United States) R Harrison (New Zealand) M Venus | 3 | 2
(France) L Pouille (France) J-W Tsonga | 6 | 6
(Spain) F López (Spain) M López | 3 | 4

Second round
1 | (Finland) H Kontinen (Australia) J Peers | 6 | 7
(Netherlands) J-J Rojer (Romania) H Tecău | 4 | 5
(Colombia) JS Cabal (Spain) P Carreño Busta | 3 | 6^{3}
8 | (Austria) O Marach (Croatia) M Pavić | 6 | 7^{7}
4 | (United States) B Bryan (United States) M Bryan | 6 | 7
(Argentina) JM del Potro (Bulgaria) G Dimitrov | 3 | 5
(France) L Pouille (France) J-W Tsonga | 1 | 7^{7} | [3]
5 | (France) P-H Herbert (France) N Mahut | 6 | 6^{5} | [10]

Quarterfinals
1 | (Finland) H Kontinen (Australia) J Peers | 6^{9} | 5
8 | (Austria) O Marach (Croatia) M Pavić | 7^{11} | 7
4 | (United States) B Bryan (United States) M Bryan | 6^{5} | 6^{11}
5 | (France) P-H Herbert (France) N Mahut | 7^{7} | 7^{13}

Semifinals
8 | (Austria) O Marach (Croatia) M Pavić | 5 | 3
5 | (France) P-H Herbert (France) N Mahut | 7 | 6

=== Bottom half ===
First round
(United States) N Monroe (United States) J Sock | 4 | 6 | [4]
(Russia) K Khachanov (Austria) D Thiem | 6 | 2 | [10]
(Italy) P Lorenzi (Spain) A Ramos Viñolas | 5 | 6^{4}
Alt | (France) G Monfils (France) B Paire | 7 | 7^{7}
(Spain) R Bautista Agut (Spain) D Ferrer | 4 | 6 | [10]
WC | (Canada) D Nestor (Canada) V Pospisil | 6 | 4 | [2]
WC | (Canada) F Dancevic (Canada) A Shamasdin | 4 | 2
(France) F Martin (France) É Roger-Vasselin | 6 | 6

Second round
7 | (India) R Bopanna (Croatia) I Dodig | 7^{7} | 6
(Russia) K Khachanov (Austria) D Thiem | 6^{3} | 4
Alt | (France) G Monfils (France) B Paire | 7^{7} | 6^{5} | [10]
3 | (United Kingdom) J Murray (Brazil) B Soares | 6^{4} | 7^{7} | [5]
6 | (South Africa) R Klaasen (United States) R Ram | w/o
(Spain) R Bautista Agut (Spain) D Ferrer
(France) F Martin (France) É Roger-Vasselin | 6 | 6
2 | (Poland) Ł Kubot (Brazil) M Melo | 4 | 2

Quarterfinals
7 | (India) R Bopanna (Croatia) I Dodig | 6 | 7
Alt | (France) G Monfils (France) B Paire | 2 | 5
6 | (South Africa) R Klaasen (United States) R Ram | 5 | 7 | [10]
(France) F Martin (France) É Roger-Vasselin | 7 | 5 | [8]

Semifinals
7 | (India) R Bopanna (Croatia) I Dodig | 4 | 7^{10} | [11]
6 | (South Africa) R Klaasen (United States) R Ram | 6 | 6^{8} | [9]
