= 2016 Monte-Carlo Rolex Masters – Singles =

Singles
- 2016 Monte-Carlo Rolex Masters

Final
- Champion: (Spain) Rafael Nadal
- Runner-up: (France) Gaël Monfils
- Score: 7–5, 5–7, 6–0

Details
- Draw: 56 (7 Q / 4 WC )
- Seeds: 16

Events
Singles	Doubles
← 2015 ·	Monte-Carlo Rolex Masters	· 2017 →

Rafael Nadal defeated Gaël Monfils in the final, 7–5, 5–7, 6–0 to win the singles tennis title at the 2016 Monte-Carlo Masters. It was his record-extending ninth Monte-Carlo Masters title.

Novak Djokovic was the defending champion, but lost in the second round to Jiří Veselý.

== Seeds ==
The top eight seeds receive a bye into the second round.

1. (Serbia) Novak Djokovic (second round)
2. (United Kingdom) Andy Murray (semifinals)
3. (Switzerland) Roger Federer (quarterfinals)
4. (Switzerland) Stan Wawrinka (quarterfinals)
5. (Spain) Rafael Nadal (champion)
6. (Czech Republic) Tomáš Berdych (second round)
7. (Spain) ~~David Ferrer~~ (withdrew due to muscle injury)
8. (France) Jo-Wilfried Tsonga (semifinals)

9. (France) Richard Gasquet (second round)
10. (Canada) Milos Raonic (quarterfinals)
11. (Belgium) David Goffin (third round)
12. (Austria) Dominic Thiem (third round)
13. (France) Gaël Monfils (final)
14. (Spain) Roberto Bautista Agut (third round)
15. (France) Gilles Simon (third round)
16. (France) Benoît Paire (third round)

Click on the seed number of a player to go to their draw section.

== Draw ==
=== Key ===
- Q = Qualifier
- WC = Wild card
- LL = Lucky loser
- Alt = Alternate
- SE = Special exempt
- PR = Protected ranking
- ITF = ITF entry
- JE = Junior exempt
- w/o = Walkover
- r = Retired
- d = Defaulted
- SR = Special ranking

=== Finals ===
Quarterfinals
13	(France) Gaël Monfils	6	6
LL	(Spain) Marcel Granollers	2	4
3	(Switzerland) Roger Federer	6	2	5
8	(France) Jo-Wilfried Tsonga	3	6	7
5	(Spain) Rafael Nadal	6	6
4	(Switzerland) Stan Wawrinka	1	4
10	(Canada) Milos Raonic	2	0
2	(United Kingdom) Andy Murray	6	6

Semifinals
13	(France) Gaël Monfils	6	6
8	(France) Jo-Wilfried Tsonga	1	3
5	(Spain) Rafael Nadal	2	6	6
2	(United Kingdom) Andy Murray	6	4	2

Final
13	(France) Gaël Monfils	5	7	0
5	(Spain) Rafael Nadal	7	5	6

=== Top half ===
==== Section 1 ====
First round
(Czech Republic) J Veselý	3	7	7
(Russia) T Gabashvili	6	5	5
(Italy) F Fognini	6	0	1
(Italy) P Lorenzi	2	6	6
(Luxembourg) G Müller	5	0
13	(France) G Monfils	7	6
11	(Belgium) D Goffin	7	6
(Spain) F López	5	0
WC	(Spain) F Verdasco	6	6
(Argentina) F Delbonis	0	3
(Germany) A Zverev	6	6
WC	(Russia) A Rublev	1	3

Second round
1	(Serbia) N Djokovic	4	6	4
(Czech Republic) J Veselý	6	2	6
(Italy) P Lorenzi	2	4
13	(France) G Monfils	6	6
11	(Belgium) D Goffin	7^{7}	2	7^{7}
WC	(Spain) F Verdasco	6^{2}	6	6^{1}
(Germany) A Zverev	4	6	3
LL	(Spain) M Granollers	6	4	6

Third round
(Czech Republic) J Veselý	1	2
13	(France) G Monfils	6	6
11	(Belgium) D Goffin	6^{1}	4
LL	(Spain) M Granollers	7^{7}	6

Quarterfinals
13	(France) G Monfils	6	6
LL	(Spain) M Granollers	2	4

==== Section 2 ====
First round
(Brazil) T Bellucci	5	1
(Spain) G García López	7	6
(France) J Chardy	7^{7}	7
(Russia) A Kuznetsov	6^{3}	5
(Spain) A Ramos Viñolas	4	6^{4}
14	(Spain) R Bautista Agut	6	7^{7}
9	(France) R Gasquet	6	6
(Spain) N Almagro	4	0
WC	(France) L Pouille	7^{7}	6
(France) N Mahut	6^{1}	3
Q	(France) S Robert	3	1
(Spain) P Carreño Busta	6	6

Second round
3	(Switzerland) R Federer	6	6
(Spain) G García López	3	4
(France) J Chardy	3	7	5
14	(Spain) R Bautista Agut	6	5	7
9	(France) R Gasquet	6	5	1
WC	(France) L Pouille	4	7	6
(Spain) P Carreño Busta	6^{1}	6^{5}
8	(France) J-W Tsonga	7^{7}	7^{7}

Third round
3	(Switzerland) R Federer	6	6
14	(Spain) R Bautista Agut	2	4
WC	(France) L Pouille	4	4
8	(France) J-W Tsonga	6	6

Quarterfinals
3	(Switzerland) R Federer	6	2	5
8	(France) J-W Tsonga	3	6	7

=== Bottom half ===
==== Section 3 ====
First round
(Czech Republic) L Rosol	2	3
(United Kingdom) A Bedene	6	6
(France) A Mannarino	3	4
Q	(Japan) T Daniel	6	6
Q	(Germany) J-L Struff	6	3	4
12	(Austria) D Thiem	1	6	6
15	(France) G Simon	6	6
(Serbia) V Troicki	3	4
(Bulgaria) G Dimitrov	6	6
Q	(Serbia) F Krajinović	3	2
(Germany) P Kohlschreiber	6	6
(Croatia) B Ćorić	4	4

Second round
5	(Spain) R Nadal	6	6
(United Kingdom) A Bedene	3	3
Q	(Japan) T Daniel	6	2	0
12	(Austria) D Thiem	4	6	6
15	(France) G Simon	6	6
(Bulgaria) G Dimitrov	4	3
(Germany) P Kohlschreiber	6^{2}	5
4	(Switzerland) S Wawrinka	7^{7}	7

Third round
5	(Spain) R Nadal	7	6
12	(Austria) D Thiem	5	3
15	(France) G Simon	1	2
4	(Switzerland) S Wawrinka	6	6

Quarterfinals
5	(Spain) R Nadal	6	6
4	(Switzerland) S Wawrinka	1	4

==== Section 4 ====
First round
(Netherlands) R Haase	2	0
Q	(Bosnia and Herzegovina) D Džumhur	6	6
Q	(Spain) D Gimeno Traver	6^{2}	7^{7}	6^{4}
(Uruguay) P Cuevas	7^{7}	6^{2}	7^{7}
WC	(Italy) M Cecchinato	3	5
10	(Canada) M Raonic	6	7
16	(France) B Paire	4	6	7^{8}
(Spain) Í Cervantes	6	2	6^{6}
(Croatia) I Karlović	3	6^{4}
(Portugal) J Sousa	6	7^{7}
Q	(France) P-H Herbert	6	6
(Argentina) G Pella	3	4

Second round
6	(Czech Republic) T Berdych	4	7^{7}	3
Q	(Bosnia and Herzegovina) D Džumhur	6	6^{1}	6
(Uruguay) P Cuevas	5	6	6^{5}
10	(Canada) M Raonic	7	2	7^{7}
16	(France) B Paire	6	6
(Portugal) J Sousa	4	3
Q	(France) P-H Herbert	2	6	3
2	(United Kingdom) A Murray	6	4	6

Third round
Q	(Bosnia and Herzegovina) D Džumhur	3	6	6^{5}
10	(Canada) M Raonic	6	4	7^{7}
16	(France) B Paire	6	5	5
2	(United Kingdom) A Murray	2	7	7

Quarterfinals
10	(Canada) M Raonic	2	0
2	(United Kingdom) A Murray	6	6

== Qualifying ==
=== Seeds ===
1. (Spain) Marcel Granollers (qualifying competition, lucky loser)
2. (Uzbekistan) Denis Istomin (first round)
3. (Russia) Mikhail Youzhny (qualifying competition)
4. (Kazakhstan) Mikhail Kukushkin (first round)
5. (Bosnia and Herzegovina) Damir Džumhur (qualified)
6. (Colombia) Santiago Giraldo (qualifying competition)
7. (Japan) Taro Daniel (qualified)
8. (Argentina) Facundo Bagnis (qualifying competition)
9. (France) Pierre-Hugues Herbert (qualified)
10. (Italy) Thomas Fabbiano (qualifying competition)
11. (Spain) Daniel Gimeno Traver (qualified)
12. (Netherlands) Thiemo de Bakker (first round)
13. (Serbia) Filip Krajinović (qualified)
14. (Germany) Jan-Lennard Struff (qualified)

=== Qualifiers ===
1. (Spain) Daniel Gimeno Traver
2. (Germany) Jan-Lennard Struff
3. (France) Pierre-Hugues Herbert
4. (France) Stéphane Robert
5. (Bosnia and Herzegovina) Damir Džumhur
6. (Serbia) Filip Krajinović
7. (Japan) Taro Daniel

=== Lucky losers ===
1. (Spain) Marcel Granollers

=== Qualifying draw ===
==== First qualifier ====
First round
1	(Spain) Marcel Granollers	6	6
(Russia) Daniil Medvedev	4	4
(Uzbekistan) Farrukh Dustov	1	2
11	(Spain) Daniel Gimeno Traver	6	6

Qualifying competition
1	(Spain) Marcel Granollers	3	0
11	(Spain) Daniel Gimeno Traver	6	6

==== Second qualifier ====
First round
2	(Uzbekistan) Denis Istomin	4	6^{4}
WC	(France) Hugo Nys	6	7^{7}
(Romania) Adrian Ungur	3	6^{6}
14	(Germany) Jan-Lennard Struff	6	7^{8}

Qualifying competition
WC	(France) Hugo Nys	2	3
14	(Germany) Jan-Lennard Struff	6	6

==== Third qualifier ====
First round
3	(Russia) Mikhail Youzhny	6	6
(Germany) Daniel Brands	4	3
(France) Kenny de Schepper	7^{10}	3	6^{5}
9	(France) Pierre-Hugues Herbert	6^{8}	6	7^{7}

Qualifying competition
3	(Russia) Mikhail Youzhny	6	6^{6}	4
9	(France) Pierre-Hugues Herbert	2	7^{8}	6

==== Fourth qualifier ====
First round
4	(Kazakhstan) Mikhail Kukushkin	6	3	4
(France) Stéphane Robert	4	6	6
WC	(Monaco) Benjamin Balleret	6	7
12	(Netherlands) Thiemo de Bakker	4	5

Qualifying competition
(France) Stéphane Robert	6	5	6
WC	(Monaco) Benjamin Balleret	3	7	1

==== Fifth qualifier ====
First round
5	(Bosnia and Herzegovina) Damir Džumhur	6	6
(Italy) Salvatore Caruso	2	3
(Italy) Filippo Volandri	4	4
10	(Italy) Thomas Fabbiano	6	6

Qualifying competition
5	(Bosnia and Herzegovina) Damir Džumhur	6	6
10	(Italy) Thomas Fabbiano	1	3

==== Sixth qualifier ====
First round
6	(Colombia) Santiago Giraldo	6	6
WC	(Monaco) Romain Arneodo	4	3
(Russia) Konstantin Kravchuk	3	1
13	(Serbia) Filip Krajinović	6	6

Qualifying competition
6	(Colombia) Santiago Giraldo	4	6^{2}
13	(Serbia) Filip Krajinović	6	7^{7}

==== Seventh qualifier ====
First round
7	(Japan) Taro Daniel	6	6
(Russia) Karen Khachanov	2	4
WC	(Monaco) Lucas Catarina	6	4	3
8	(Argentina) Facundo Bagnis	4	6	6

Qualifying competition
7	(Japan) Taro Daniel	7^{7}	6
8	(Argentina) Facundo Bagnis	6^{5}	4
