= Bruno Soares =

Brazilian tennis player

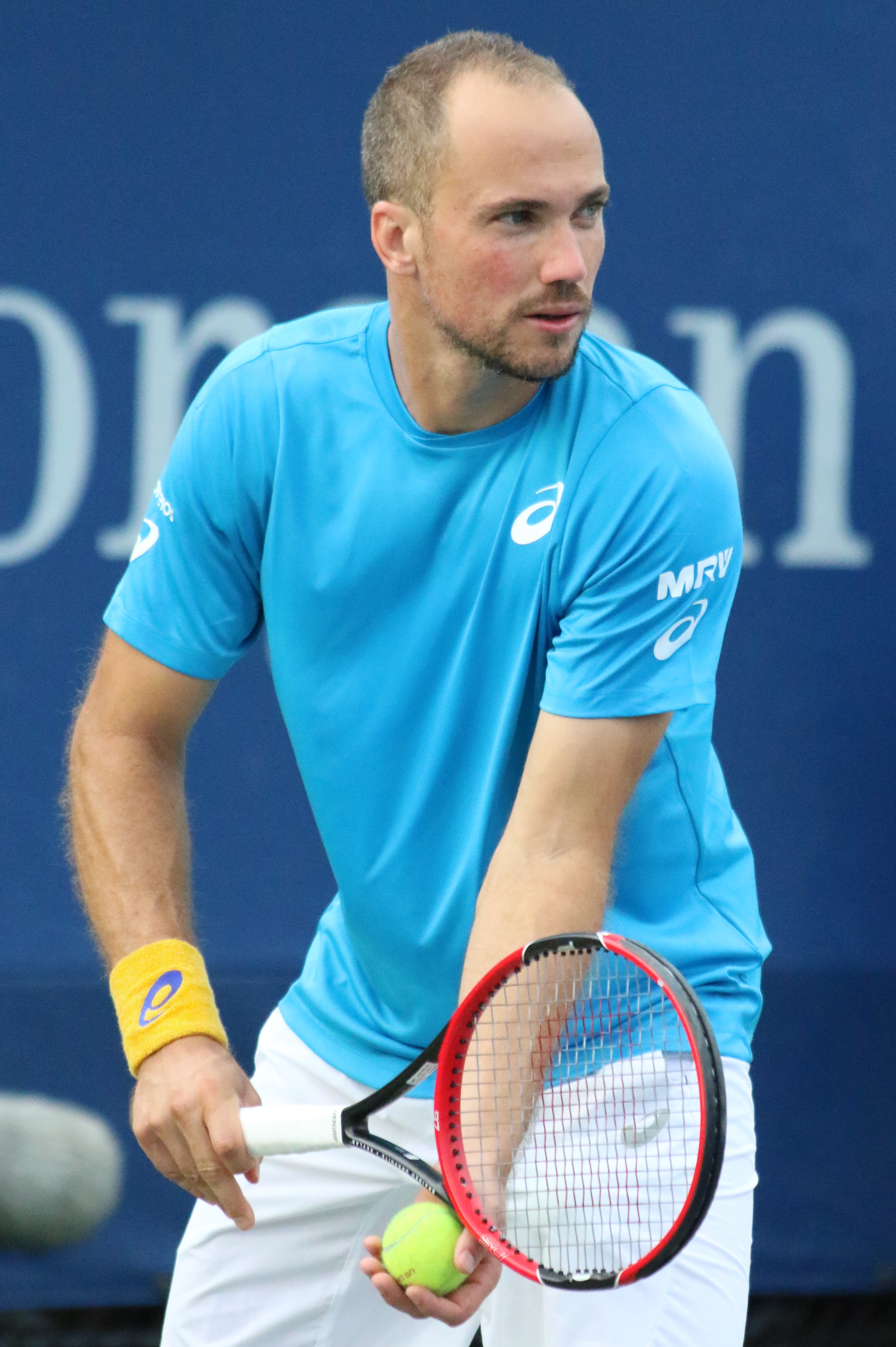
- Country (sports): Brazil
- Residence: Belo Horizonte, Brazil
- Born: 27 February 1982 (age 44) Belo Horizonte
- Height: 1.80 m (5 ft 11 in)
- Turned pro: 2001
- Retired: September 2022
- Plays: Right-handed (two-handed backhand)
- Coach: Hugo Daibert
- Prize money: US $6,948,824

Singles
- Career record: 2–0
- Career titles: 0
- Highest ranking: No. 221 (22 March 2004)

Grand Slam singles results
- French Open: Q2 (2004)
- Wimbledon: Q1 (2004)
- US Open: Q1 (2004)

Doubles
- Career record: 545–324
- Career titles: 35
- Highest ranking: No. 2 (17 October 2016)

Grand Slam doubles results
- Australian Open: W (2016)
- French Open: F (2020)
- Wimbledon: QF (2009, 2014, 2015, 2016, 2018)
- US Open: W (2016, 2020)

Other doubles tournaments
- Tour Finals: SF (2013, 2016, 2017, 2018)
- Olympic Games: QF (2012, 2016)

Mixed doubles
- Career titles: 3

Grand Slam mixed doubles results
- Australian Open: W (2016)
- French Open: SF (2014, 2019)
- Wimbledon: F (2013)
- US Open: W (2012, 2014)

Bruno Fraga Soares (Portuguese pronunciation: [ˈbɾunu soˈaɾis]; born 27 February 1982) is a Brazilian former professional tennis player who specialised in doubles.

A doubles specialist, Soares won six major titles, the Australian Open and US Open in 2016 alongside Jamie Murray, and the 2020 US Open with Mate Pavić in men's doubles. In mixed doubles, Soares won the 2012 US Open partnering Ekaterina Makarova, the 2014 US Open with Sania Mirza, and the 2016 Australian Open with Elena Vesnina. He also finished runner-up at the 2013 US Open and 2020 French Open in men's doubles, and the 2013 Wimbledon Championships in mixed doubles. Soares was the fourth Brazilian to win a major title in any discipline, following Maria Bueno, Thomaz Koch and Gustavo Kuerten.

He reached his career-high doubles ranking of world No. 2 in October 2016, and has won 35 titles on the ATP Tour, including four at Masters 1000 level. Soares was part of the ATP Doubles Team of the year in both 2016 and 2020. In singles, his highest ranking was world No. 221, achieved in March 2004. Soares has represented Brazil in the Davis Cup since 2005, and competed at the 2012 and 2016 Olympic Games.

== Professional career ==
=== 2008: First ATP title ===
In early 2008, Soares won the São Paulo Challenger for the second time, rising in the doubles rankings and gaining the opportunity to compete in the main tournament circuit, the ATP tours. In 2008, Soares had a great campaign. Playing without a permanent partner, he reached the semifinals of Roland Garros and the quarter-finals of the US Open.

In addition, he won his first ATP doubles title in Nottingham, a grass tournament before Wimbledon.

Helped by the winnings of the French Open, Soares decided to finish 2008 marrying architect Bruna Alvim. The couple welcomed their first son, Noah, in 2015.

=== 2009 ===
In 2009, Soares partnered with Kevin Ullyett from Zimbabwe, a high level doubles player who had won 32 titles and remained ranked among the top 10 for several years. They reached the quarterfinals of Wimbledon and Roland Garros, the semifinals of the Masters 1000 Rome and Madrid, the final of the ATP New Haven, and won his second ATP doubles title in Stockholm. At the end of the year, with the retirement of Ullyett, Soares announced a new partnership with Marcelo Melo.

=== 2010 ===
In 2010, Melo and Soares reached the final of the ATP 250 Auckland at the beginning of the year. In May, they won the title of the ATP 250 Nice. In Roland Garros, Soares defeated the brothers Bob Bryan and Mike Bryan—the world's top doubles players—and reached the quarterfinals. Subsequently, Soares and Melo reached the semifinals of the ATP 500 Hamburg, the final of the ATP 250 Gstaad, the third round of the US Open, the final of the ATP 250 Metz, and the semifinals of the ATP 500 Tokyo and the ATP 250 Stockholm.

=== 2011 ===
In 2011 at the South American Clay tournaments—a series of four ATP tournaments in Latin America—Melo and Soares won two consecutive titles in the ATP 250 of Chile and Brazil, and were runners-up at the ATP 500 Acapulco. In April, Soares was runner-up of the Masters 1000 Monte Carlo, playing alongside Juan Ignacio Chela. He competed in the semifinals of the ATPs 250s in Nice and Eastbourne. In August, the Melo and Soares arrived at the semifinals of the ATP 500 Washington. In October, with Soares and Melo reached the semifinals of the ATP 500 Valencia and Tokyo, and the final of the ATP 250 Stockholm. Partnered with Nicolas Almagro he was a quarterfinalist in the Masters 1000 Shanghai. In November, Soares and Melo were quarterfinalists in the Masters 1000 Paris. At the end of the year, Melo and Soares ended their partnership.

=== 2012 ===
Soares partnered with Eric Butorac and went to the quarterfinals of the Australian Open and won his sixth ATP doubles title in the ATP 250 Brazil. He also reached the third round at Roland Garros.

On July, he ended his partnership with Butorac and began playing with Alexander Peya. In the first tournament of the new partnership, they were runners-up of the ATP 250 Bastad.

Participating at the London Olympics with Marcelo Melo, Soares reached the quarterfinals after defeating the duo Berdych/Stepanek by 24–22 in the last set.

At the US Open along with Peya, Soares reached the quarterfinals of the men's doubles. In that tournament, partnering with Ekaterina Makarova, Soares won the biggest title of his career thus far by becoming mixed-doubles champion. In the first round, they defeated the seeded No. 2 couple Mike Bryan and Lisa Raymond. In the second phase, they defeated Bob Bryan and Kim Clijsters. Since Gustavo Kuerten's 3rd Roland Garros victory in 2001, a Brazilian had not won a Grand Slam title. Soares/Makarova won $150,000 as a prize for the title.

After the mixed doubles title at the US Open, Soares took an impressive winning streak, winning the doubles match of the Davis Cup in Brazil against Russia and won four titles in five consecutive tournaments played. He won the ATP 250 Kuala Lumpur and the ATP 500 Tokyo, both playing with Peya; they played the Masters 1000 Shanghai but lost in the second round. Partnered with Melo he won the ATP 250 Stockholm, and the ATP 500 Valencia playing with Peya. In the Masters 1000 Paris, Soares and Peya were quarterfinalists.

=== 2013 ===
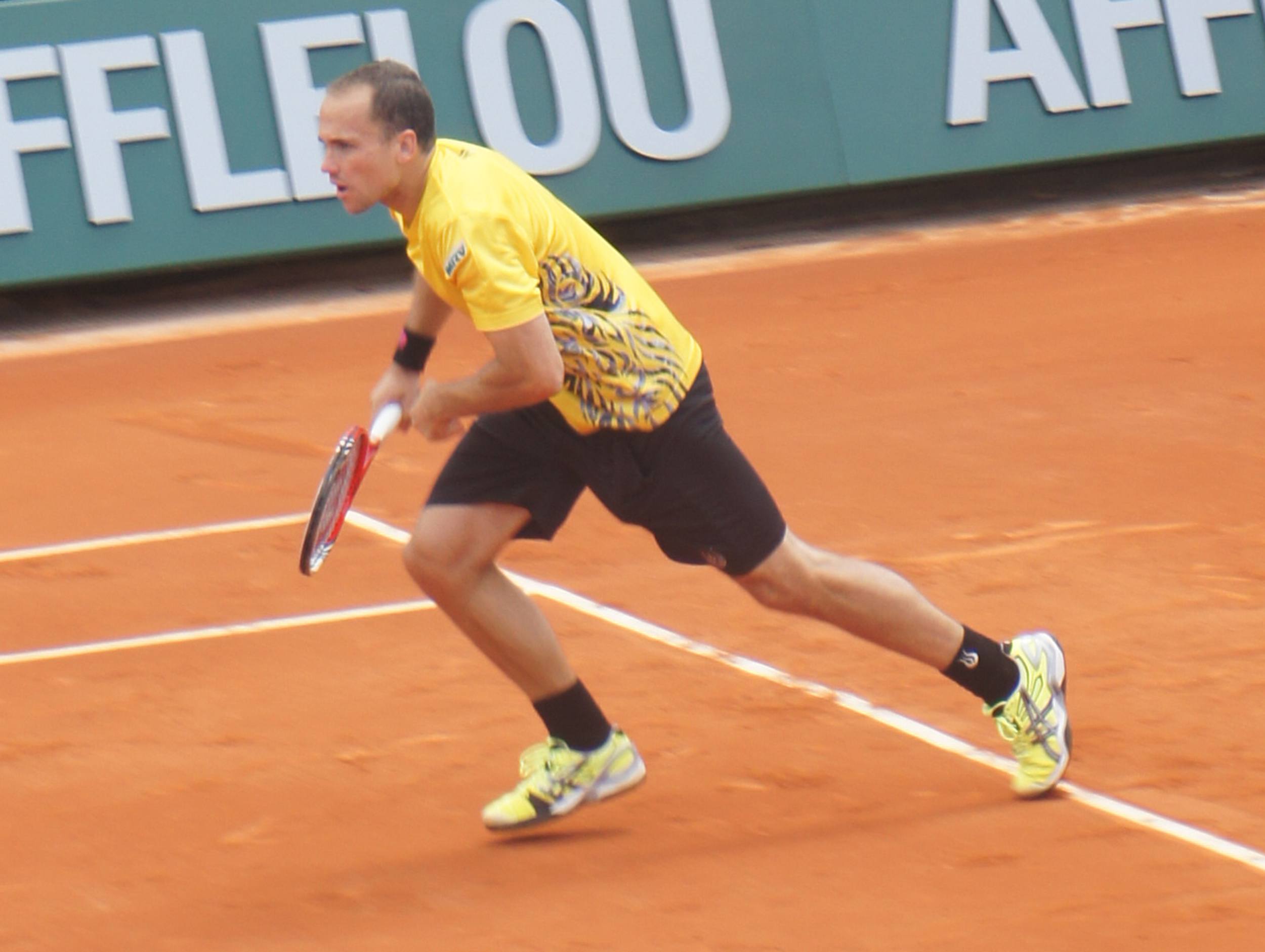
Soares at the French Open 2013

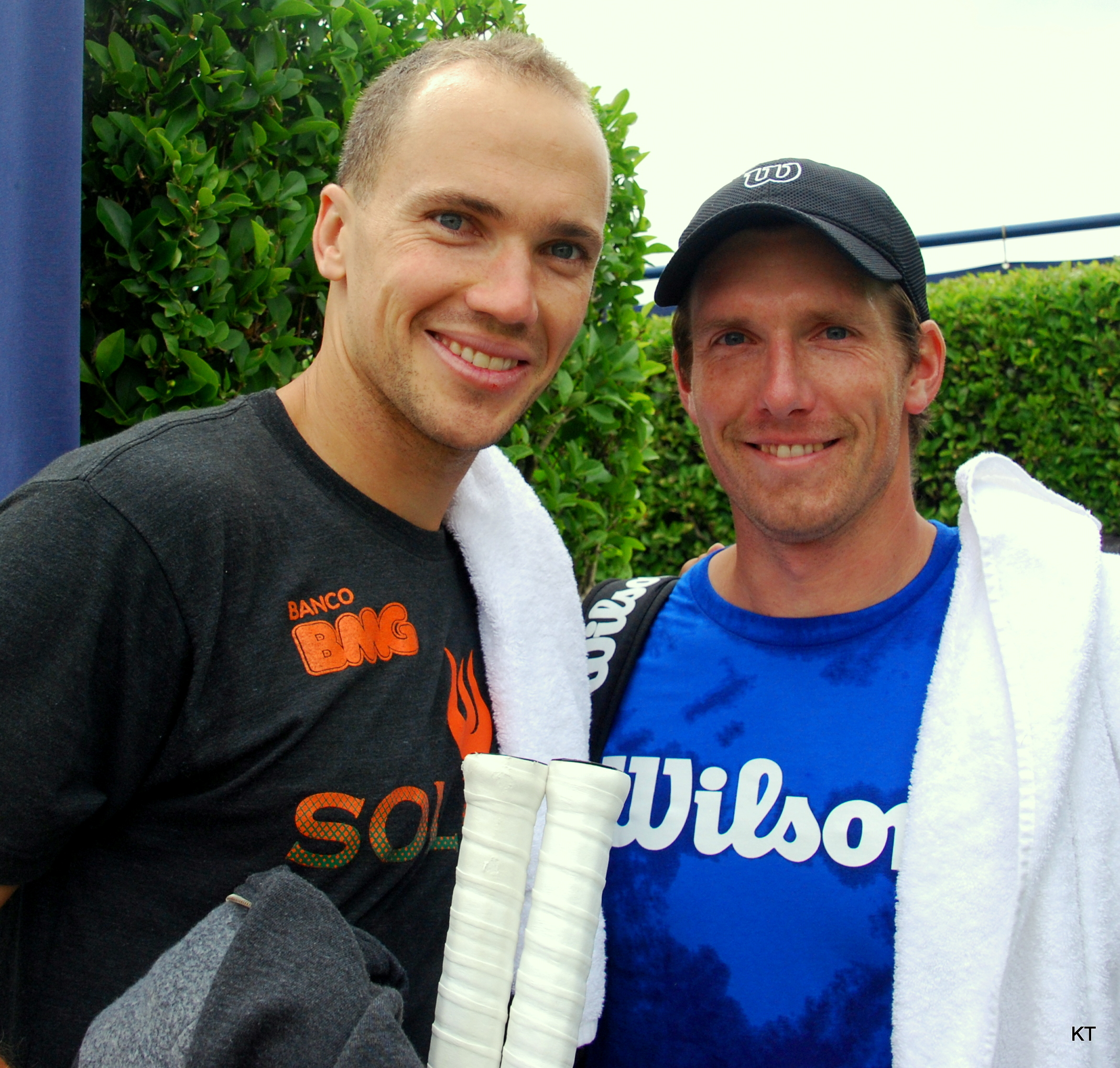
Bruno Soares and Alexander Peya

2013 was the best year in the Soares' career. In January, he won the ATP 250 Auckland, alongside Scottish Colin Fleming. In February, partnered with Melo, he defeated the Bryan brothers at the Davis Cup in the United States. In the same month, he and Peya won the ATP 250 Brasil—Soares' third win in that tournament— and reached the semifinals of the ATP 500 in Memphis and Acapulco.

In March, Soares reached the semifinals of the Masters 1000 Indian Wells. In April, he won the ATP 500 Barcelona. In May, for the second time in his career, he was runner-up of a Masters 1000 in Madrid, losing only to the world leaders the Bryan brothers. At this point, Soares approached the top 10 doubles, staying at 11th place. In Roland Garros, Soares and Peya reached the semifinals of the tournament. With that, Soares entered the top 10, ranking sixth for doubles. Soares equaled Carlos Kirmayr's No. 6 in the world in 1983 as the second-best doubles tennis player in Brazil's history.

In preparation for Wimbledon, Soares was runner-up in the ATP 250 Queens and champion of the ATP 250 Eastbourne, reaching its 200th victory. At Wimbledon, Soares was knocked out in the third round of the men's doubles. In mixed doubles, Soares reached the final of the tournament for the first time, partnered with the American Lisa Raymond. He was runner-up at the ATP 500 Hamburg in July. In August, Soares and Peya won a Masters-1000 title for the first time at the Canadian Open. With that, Soares arrived at the best doubles ranking of his career, No. 4 in the world, equaling Cássio Motta as the best Brazilian doubles player of all time.

At the US Open, Soares "retired" James Blake in the first round of the men's doubles. In mixed doubles, Soares reached the semifinals partnered with Anabel Medina Garrigues. In men's doubles—for the first time in his career—he reached a Grand Slam final. However, Peya suffered a muscle strain near the end of the semifinals game against Melo and Dodig. In the US Open final, Soares could not play well because of the problem, and in the second set, Peya almost abandoned the game. Soares and Peya eventually lost the final in two sets. With these results, Soares qualified in anticipation for the ATP Finals for the first time in his career.

On 7 October 2013, Soares became the No. 3 doubles player in the world; his best position of his career and the best position in the history of Brazilian tennis—surpassing Cassio Motta, who was No. 4 doubles in 1983. At the end of October, Soares and Peya became two-time champions of the ATP 500 Valencia, defeating the Bryan brothers in the final.

=== 2014 ===
In 2014, the Soares/Peya partnership was beginning not to work as before. During the year, they had as prominent campaigns only the title of the Masters 1000 in Canada and one runner-up finish at the Masters 1000 Indian Wells, as well as a title in the ATP 250 in London. Soares finished the year as No. 10 in the world.

=== 2015 ===
The partnership did not work well. Just as in 2014, they obtained only two quarterfinals in Grand Slam events, and the result in the Masters 1000 has worsened, with the pair getting only two semifinals in Miami and Canada. Soares finished the year as No. 22 in the world. In October, Soares announced the ending of his partnership with Alexander Peya, and a new partnership with Britain's Jamie Murray in the 2016 season.

=== 2016 ===
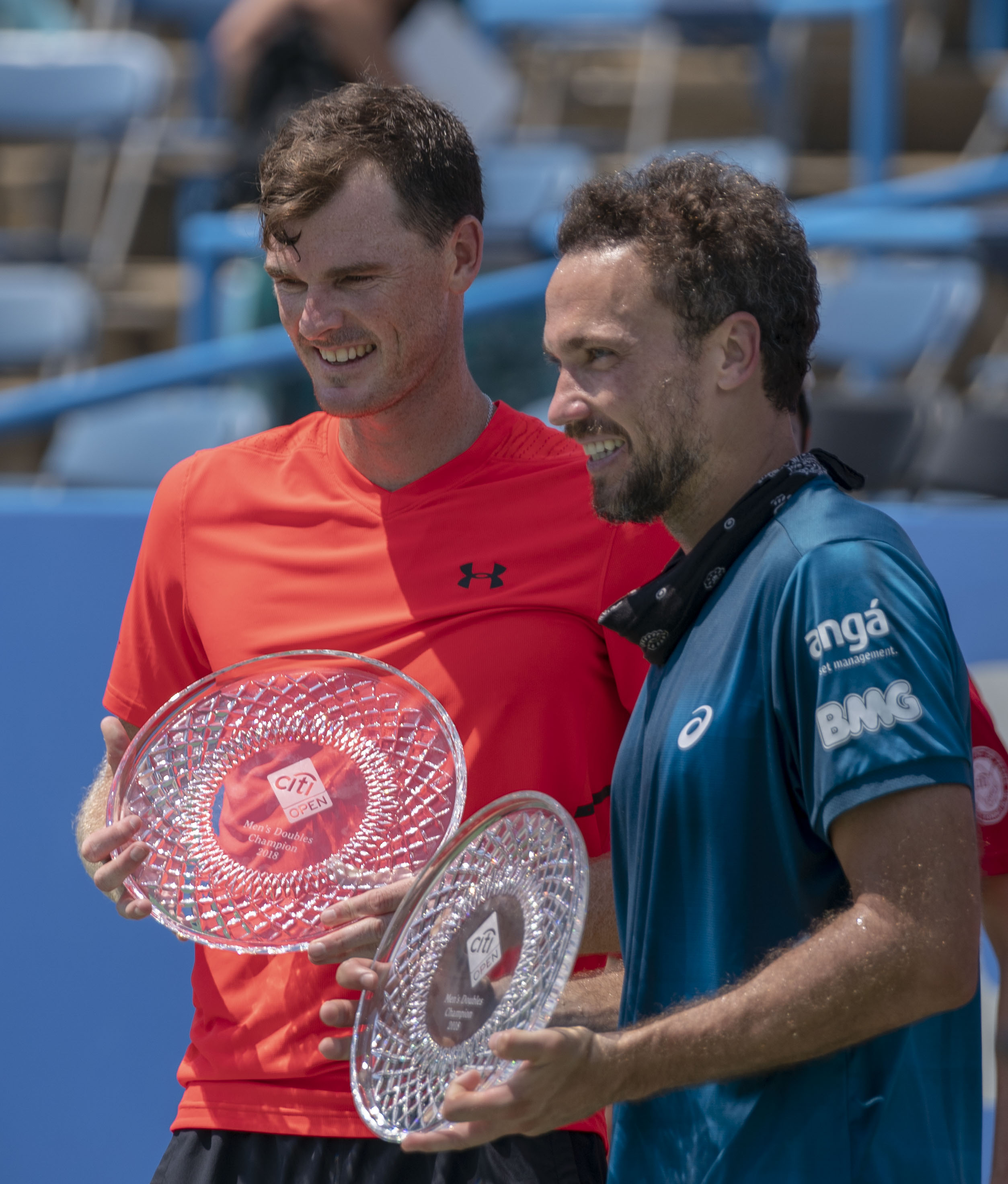
Soares has won ten titles with Jamie Murray, including the 2018 Cincinnati Masters

The Soares and Murray partnership had an astonishing start. They reached the semifinals of the Doha ATP Tour 250, the first tournament of the season. On 16 January, Soares and Murray won the second tournament of the season, the Sydney ATP Tour 250. On January 30, the duo won the Australian Open. It was Soares' first Grand Slam title in men's doubles. Murray/Soares defeated the team of the Czech Radek Štěpánek and the Canadian Daniel Nestor in three sets in the men's doubles final. Soares partnered with Elena Vesnina in the mixed doubles and reached the final, where they overcame Horia Tecău and CoCo Vandeweghe in three sets. Soares became the first Brazilian man to win two titles in the same Grand Slam.

Soares and Murray would combine to also win the US Open men's doubles title in 2016. Soares ended the season at No. 1 in the ATP doubles race alongside Murray.

=== 2017 ===
In the new season, the Soares/Murray duo dropped a little income, not obtaining any Grand Slam or Masters 1000 titles. Their best results in these tournaments were the runner-up of the Masters 1000 of Cincinnati, the semifinals of the Masters 1000 of Indian Wells, Shanghai and Paris, and the quarterfinals of Roland Garros and the US Open. They won the ATP 500 from Acapulco, Queens, and the ATP 250 from Stuttgart. Thus, Soares ended the year as No. 10 in the world in doubles.

=== 2018 ===
Soares obtains as his biggest title the Masters 1000 of Cincinnati. He was also runner-up in the Shanghai Masters 1000, and a semifinalist in Rome and got quarterfinals at Wimbledon and the US Open. He became twice champion of the ATP 500 in Acapulco, won the ATP 500 in Washington, and was runner-up in the ATP 500 in Queens. The year ended as No. 7 in the world in doubles.

=== 2019 ===
In January, Soares and partner Jamie Murray reached the quarterfinal at the Australian Open, but were defeated in straight sets. In May, they ended their three-and-a-half-year partnership after a first-round loss at the French Open. Soares announced 2018 Australian Open and 2018 Davis Cup winner, Croatian Mate Pavić, as his new partner.

His biggest title of the year was winning the Masters 1000 in Shanghai, playing with Pavic. He also won the Sydney ATP 250 with Murray, and the ATP 250 Stuttgart playing with John Peers. During a difficult year, he was still a semifinalist at the Masters 1000 in Monte Carlo and Cincinnati, made the quarterfinals at the Australian Open and was runner-up in the ATP 500 in Barcelona. He ended the year outside the top 10, which had not happened since 2015, as No. 21 in the world.

=== 2021 ===
At the US Open, Soares, partnering with Jamie Murray, reached the final for the fourth time in his career, defeating Filip Polášek and John Peers in the semifinals.

=== 2022: Retirement ===
He played his last match at the 2022 US Open with Jamie Murray.

== Significant finals ==
=== Grand Slam finals ===
==== Doubles: 6 (3 titles, 3 runner-ups) ====
Result	Year	Championship	Surface	Partner	Opponents	Score
Loss	2013	US Open	Hard	(Austria) Alexander Peya	(India) Leander Paes (Czech Republic) Radek Štěpánek	1–6, 3–6
Win	2016	Australian Open	Hard	(United Kingdom) Jamie Murray	(Canada) Daniel Nestor (Czech Republic) Radek Štěpánek	2–6, 6–4, 7–5
Win	2016	US Open	Hard	(United Kingdom) Jamie Murray	(Spain) Pablo Carreño Busta (Spain) Guillermo García-López	6–2, 6–3
Win	2020	US Open	Hard	(Croatia) Mate Pavić	(Netherlands) Wesley Koolhof (Croatia) Nikola Mektić	7–5, 6–3
Loss	2020	French Open	Clay	(Croatia) Mate Pavić	(Germany) Kevin Krawietz (Germany) Andreas Mies	3–6, 5–7
Loss	2021	US Open	Hard	(United Kingdom) Jamie Murray	(United States) Rajeev Ram (United Kingdom) Joe Salisbury	6–3, 2–6, 2–6

==== Mixed doubles: 4 (3 titles, 1 runner-up) ====
Result	Year	Championship	Surface	Partner	Opponents	Score
Win	2012	US Open	Hard	(Russia) Ekaterina Makarova	(Czech Republic) Květa Peschke (Poland) Marcin Matkowski	6–7^{(8–10)}, 6–1, [12–10]
Loss	2013	Wimbledon	Grass	(United States) Lisa Raymond	(France) Kristina Mladenovic (Canada) Daniel Nestor	7–5, 2–6, 6–8
Win	2014	US Open	Hard	(India) Sania Mirza	(United States) Abigail Spears (Mexico) Santiago González	6–1, 2–6, [11–9]
Win	2016	Australian Open	Hard	(Russia) Elena Vesnina	(United States) Coco Vandeweghe (Romania) Horia Tecău	6–4, 4–6, [10–5]

=== Masters 1000 finals ===
==== Doubles: 13 (4 titles, 9 runner-ups) ====
Result	Year	Tournament	Surface	Partner	Opponents	Score
Loss	2011	Monte-Carlo Masters	Clay	(Argentina) Juan Ignacio Chela	(United States) Bob Bryan (United States) Mike Bryan	3–6, 2–6
Loss	2013	Madrid Open	Clay	(Austria) Alexander Peya	(United States) Bob Bryan (United States) Mike Bryan	2–6, 3–6
Win	2013	Canadian Open	Hard	(Austria) Alexander Peya	(United Kingdom) Andy Murray (United Kingdom) Colin Fleming	6–4, 7–6^{(7–4)}
Loss	2013	Paris Masters	Hard (i)	(Austria) Alexander Peya	(United States) Bob Bryan (United States) Mike Bryan	3–6, 3–6
Loss	2014	Indian Wells Masters	Hard	(Austria) Alexander Peya	(United States) Bob Bryan (United States) Mike Bryan	4–6, 3–6
Win	2014	Canadian Open	Hard	(Austria) Alexander Peya	(Croatia) Ivan Dodig (Brazil) Marcelo Melo	6–4, 6–3
Loss	2016	Monte-Carlo Masters	Clay	(United Kingdom) Jamie Murray	(France) Pierre-Hugues Herbert (France) Nicolas Mahut	6–4, 0–6, [6–10]
Loss	2016	Canadian Open	Hard	(United Kingdom) Jamie Murray	(Croatia) Ivan Dodig (Brazil) Marcelo Melo	4–6, 4–6
Loss	2017	Cincinnati Masters	Hard	(United Kingdom) Jamie Murray	(France) Pierre-Hugues Herbert (France) Nicolas Mahut	6–7^{(6–8)}, 4–6
Win	2018	Cincinnati Masters	Hard	(United Kingdom) Jamie Murray	(Colombia) Juan Sebastián Cabal (Colombia) Robert Farah	4–6, 6–3, [10–6]
Loss	2018	Shanghai Masters	Hard	(United Kingdom) Jamie Murray	(Poland) Łukasz Kubot (Brazil) Marcelo Melo	4–6, 2–6
Win	2019	Shanghai Masters	Hard	(Croatia) Mate Pavić	(Poland) Łukasz Kubot (Brazil) Marcelo Melo	6–4, 6–2
Loss	2020	Paris Masters	Hard (i)	(Croatia) Mate Pavić	(Canada) Félix Auger-Aliassime (Poland) Hubert Hurkacz	7–6^{(7–3)}, 6–7^{(7–9)}, [2–10]

== ATP career finals ==
=== Doubles: 69 (35 titles, 34 runner-ups) ===
Legend Grand Slam tournaments (3–3) ATP World Tour Finals (0–0) ATP World Tour Masters 1000 (4–9) ATP World Tour 500 Series (9–7) ATP World Tour 250 Series (19–15)	Finals by surface Hard (22–19) Clay (7–11) Grass (6–4) Carpet (0–0)	Finals by location Outdoors (26–29) Indoors (9–5)

Result	W–L	Date	Tournament	Tier	Surface	Partner	Opponents	Score
Win	1–0	Jun 2008	Nottingham Open, United Kingdom	International	Grass (Note: The final itself was played on indoor hard due to rain.)	(Zimbabwe) Kevin Ullyett	(South Africa) Jeff Coetzee (United Kingdom) Jamie Murray	6–2, 7–6^{(7–5)}
Loss	1–1	Aug 2008	Washington Open, United States	International	Hard	(Zimbabwe) Kevin Ullyett	(France) Marc Gicquel (Sweden) Robert Lindstedt	6–7^{(6–8)}, 3–6
Loss	1–2	Aug 2009	New Haven Open, United States	250 Series	Hard	(Zimbabwe) Kevin Ullyett	(Austria) Julian Knowle (Austria) Jürgen Melzer	4–6, 6–7^{(3–7)}
Win	2–2	Oct 2009	Stockholm Open, Sweden	250 Series	Hard (i)	(Zimbabwe) Kevin Ullyett	(Sweden) Simon Aspelin (Australia) Paul Hanley	6–4, 7–6^{(7–4)}
Loss	2–3	Jan 2010	Auckland Open, New Zealand	250 Series	Hard	(Brazil) Marcelo Melo	(New Zealand) Marcus Daniell (Romania) Horia Tecău	5–7, 4–6
Win	3–3	May 2010	Open de Nice Côte d'Azur, France	250 Series	Clay	(Brazil) Marcelo Melo	(India) Rohan Bopanna (Pakistan) Aisam-ul-Haq Qureshi	1–6, 6–3, [10–5]
Loss	3–4	Aug 2010	Swiss Open, Switzerland	250 Series	Clay	(Brazil) Marcelo Melo	(Sweden) Johan Brunström (Finland) Jarkko Nieminen	3–6, 7–6^{(7–4)}, [9–11]
Loss	3–5	Sep 2010	Open de Moselle, France	250 Series	Hard (i)	(Brazil) Marcelo Melo	(Jamaica) Dustin Brown (Netherlands) Rogier Wassen	3–6, 3–6
Win	4–5	Feb 2011	Chile Open, Chile	250 Series	Clay	(Brazil) Marcelo Melo	(Poland) Łukasz Kubot (Austria) Oliver Marach	6–3, 7–6^{(7–3)}
Win	5–5	Feb 2011	Brasil Open, Brazil	250 Series	Clay	(Brazil) Marcelo Melo	(Spain) Pablo Andújar (Spain) Daniel Gimeno Traver	7–6^{(7–4)}, 6–3
Loss	5–6	Feb 2011	Mexican Open, Mexico	500 Series	Clay	(Brazil) Marcelo Melo	(Romania) Victor Hănescu (Romania) Horia Tecău	1–6, 3–6
Loss	5–7	Apr 2011	Monte-Carlo Masters, Monaco	Masters 1000	Clay	(Argentina) Juan Ignacio Chela	(United States) Bob Bryan (United States) Mike Bryan	3–6, 2–6
Loss	5–8	Oct 2011	Stockholm Open, Sweden	250 Series	Hard (i)	(Brazil) Marcelo Melo	(India) Rohan Bopanna (Pakistan) Aisam-ul-Haq Qureshi	1–6, 3–6
Win	6–8	Feb 2012	Brasil Open, Brazil (2)	250 Series	Clay (i)	(United States) Eric Butorac	(Slovakia) Michal Mertiňák (Brazil) André Sá	3–6, 6–4, [10–8]
Loss	6–9	Jul 2012	Swedish Open, Sweden	250 Series	Clay	(Austria) Alexander Peya	(Sweden) Robert Lindstedt (Romania) Horia Tecău	3–6, 6–7^{(5–7)}
Win	7–9	Sep 2012	Malaysian Open, Malaysia	250 Series	Hard (i)	(Austria) Alexander Peya	(United Kingdom) Colin Fleming (United Kingdom) Ross Hutchins	5–7, 7–5, [10–7]
Win	8–9	Oct 2012	Japan Open, Japan	500 Series	Hard	(Austria) Alexander Peya	(India) Leander Paes (Czech Republic) Radek Štěpánek	6–3, 7–6^{(7–5)}
Win	9–9	Oct 2012	Stockholm Open, Sweden (2)	250 Series	Hard (i)	(Brazil) Marcelo Melo	(Sweden) Robert Lindstedt (Serbia) Nenad Zimonjić	6–7^{(4–7)}, 7–5, [10–6]
Win	10–9	Oct 2012	Valencia Open, Spain	500 Series	Hard (i)	(Austria) Alexander Peya	(Spain) David Marrero (Spain) Fernando Verdasco	6–3, 6–2
Win	11–9	Jan 2013	Auckland Open, New Zealand	250 Series	Hard	(United Kingdom) Colin Fleming	(Sweden) Johan Brunström (Denmark) Frederik Nielsen	7–6^{(7–1)}, 7–6^{(7–2)}
Win	12–9	Feb 2013	Brasil Open, Brazil (3)	250 Series	Clay (i)	(Austria) Alexander Peya	(Czech Republic) František Čermák (Slovakia) Michal Mertiňák	6–7^{(5–7)}, 6–2, [10–7]
Win	13–9	Apr 2013	Barcelona Open, Spain	500 Series	Clay	(Austria) Alexander Peya	(Sweden) Robert Lindstedt (Canada) Daniel Nestor	5–7, 7–6^{(9–7)}, [10–4]
Loss	13–10	May 2013	Madrid Open, Spain	Masters 1000	Clay	(Austria) Alexander Peya	(United States) Bob Bryan (United States) Mike Bryan	2–6, 3–6
Loss	13–11	Jun 2013	Queen's Club Championships, United Kingdom	250 Series	Grass	(Austria) Alexander Peya	(United States) Bob Bryan (United States) Mike Bryan	6–4, 5–7, [3–10]
Win	14–11	Jun 2013	Eastbourne International, United Kingdom	250 Series	Grass	(Austria) Alexander Peya	(United Kingdom) Colin Fleming (United Kingdom) Jonathan Marray	3–6, 6–3, [10–8]
Loss	14–12	Jul 2013	German Open, Germany	500 Series	Clay	(Austria) Alexander Peya	(Poland) Mariusz Fyrstenberg (Poland) Marcin Matkowski	6–3, 1–6, [8–10]
Win	15–12	Aug 2013	Canadian Open, Canada	Masters 1000	Hard	(Austria) Alexander Peya	(United Kingdom) Colin Fleming (United Kingdom) Andy Murray	6–4, 7–6^{(7–4)}
Loss	15–13	Sep 2013	US Open, United States	Grand Slam	Hard	(Austria) Alexander Peya	(India) Leander Paes (Czech Republic) Radek Štěpánek	1–6, 3–6
Win	16–13	Oct 2013	Valencia Open, Spain (2)	500 Series	Hard (i)	(Austria) Alexander Peya	(United States) Bob Bryan (United States) Mike Bryan	7–6^{(7–3)}, 6–7^{(1–7)}, [13–11]
Loss	16–14	Nov 2013	Paris Masters, France	Masters 1000	Hard (i)	(Austria) Alexander Peya	(United States) Bob Bryan (United States) Mike Bryan	3–6, 3–6
Loss	16–15	Jan 2014	Qatar Open, Qatar	250 Series	Hard	(Austria) Alexander Peya	(Czech Republic) Tomáš Berdych (Czech Republic) Jan Hájek	2–6, 4–6
Loss	16–16	Jan 2014	Auckland Open, New Zealand (2)	250 Series	Hard	(Austria) Alexander Peya	(Austria) Julian Knowle (Brazil) Marcelo Melo	6–4, 3–6, [5–10]
Loss	16–17	Mar 2014	Indian Wells Masters, United States	Masters 1000	Hard	(Austria) Alexander Peya	(United States) Bob Bryan (United States) Mike Bryan	4–6, 3–6
Win	17–17	Jun 2014	Queen's Club Championships, United Kingdom	250 Series	Grass	(Austria) Alexander Peya	(United Kingdom) Jamie Murray (Australia) John Peers	4–6, 7–6^{(7–4)}, [10–4]
Loss	17–18	Jun 2014	Eastbourne International, United Kingdom	250 Series	Grass	(Austria) Alexander Peya	(Philippines) Treat Huey (United Kingdom) Dominic Inglot	5–7, 7–5, [8–10]
Loss	17–19	Jul 2014	German Open, Germany (2)	500 Series	Clay	(Austria) Alexander Peya	(Croatia) Marin Draganja (Romania) Florin Mergea	4–6, 5–7
Win	18–19	Aug 2014	Canadian Open, Canada (2)	Masters 1000	Hard	(Austria) Alexander Peya	(Croatia) Ivan Dodig (Brazil) Marcelo Melo	6–4, 6–3
Win	19–19	May 2015	Bavarian International Tennis Championships, Germany	250 Series	Clay	(Austria) Alexander Peya	(Germany) Alexander Zverev (Germany) Mischa Zverev	4–6, 6–1, [10–5]
Loss	19–20	Jun 2015	Stuttgart Open, Germany	250 Series	Grass	(Austria) Alexander Peya	(India) Rohan Bopanna (Romania) Florin Mergea	5–7, 6–2, [10–7]
Win	20–20	Nov 2015	Swiss Indoors, Switzerland	500 Series	Hard (i)	(Austria) Alexander Peya	(United Kingdom) Jamie Murray (Australia) John Peers	7–5, 7–5
Win	21–20	Jan 2016	Sydney International, Australia	250 Series	Hard	(United Kingdom) Jamie Murray	(India) Rohan Bopanna (Romania) Florin Mergea	6–3, 7–6^{(8–6)}
Win	22–20	Jan 2016	Australian Open, Australia	Grand Slam	Hard	(United Kingdom) Jamie Murray	(Canada) Daniel Nestor (Czech Republic) Radek Štěpánek	2–6, 6–4, 7–5
Loss	22–21	Apr 2016	Monte-Carlo Masters, Monaco (2)	Masters 1000	Clay	(United Kingdom) Jamie Murray	(France) Pierre-Hugues Herbert (France) Nicolas Mahut	6–4, 0–6, [6–10]
Loss	22–22	Jul 2016	Canadian Open, Canada	Masters 1000	Hard	(United Kingdom) Jamie Murray	(Croatia) Ivan Dodig (Brazil) Marcelo Melo	4–6, 4–6
Win	23–22	Sep 2016	US Open, United States	Grand Slam	Hard	(United Kingdom) Jamie Murray	(Spain) Pablo Carreño Busta (Spain) Guillermo García-López	6–2, 6–3
Loss	23–23	Jan 2017	Sydney International, Australia	250 Series	Hard	(United Kingdom) Jamie Murray	(Netherlands) Wesley Koolhof (Netherlands) Matwé Middelkoop	3–6, 5–7
Win	24–23	Mar 2017	Mexican Open, Mexico	500 Series	Hard	(United Kingdom) Jamie Murray	(United States) John Isner (Spain) Feliciano López	6–3, 6–3
Win	25–23	Jun 2017	Stuttgart Open, Germany	250 Series	Grass	(United Kingdom) Jamie Murray	(Austria) Oliver Marach (Croatia) Mate Pavić	6–7^{(4–7)}, 7–5, [10–5]
Win	26–23	Jun 2017	Queen's Club Championships, United Kingdom (2)	500 Series	Grass	(United Kingdom) Jamie Murray	(France) Julien Benneteau (France) Édouard Roger-Vasselin	6–2, 6–3
Loss	26–24	Aug 2017	Cincinnati Masters, United States	Masters 1000	Hard	(United Kingdom) Jamie Murray	(France) Pierre-Hugues Herbert (France) Nicolas Mahut	6–7^{(6–8)}, 4–6
Loss	26–25	Oct 2017	Japan Open, Japan	500 Series	Hard	(United Kingdom) Jamie Murray	(Japan) Ben McLachlan (Japan) Yasutaka Uchiyama	4–6, 6–7^{(1–7)}
Loss	26–26	Jan 2018	Qatar Open, Qatar	250 Series	Hard	(United Kingdom) Jamie Murray	(Austria) Oliver Marach (Croatia) Mate Pavić	2–6, 6–7^{(6–8)}
Win	27–26	Mar 2018	Mexican Open, Mexico (2)	500 Series	Hard	(United Kingdom) Jamie Murray	(United States) Bob Bryan (United States) Mike Bryan	7–6^{(7–4)}, 7–5
Loss	27–27	Jun 2018	Queen's Club Championships, United Kingdom	500 Series	Grass	(United Kingdom) Jamie Murray	(Finland) Henri Kontinen (Australia) John Peers	4–6, 3–6
Win	28–27	Aug 2018	Washington Open, United States	500 Series	Hard	(United Kingdom) Jamie Murray	(United States) Mike Bryan (France) Édouard Roger-Vasselin	3–6, 6–3, [10–4]
Win	29–27	Aug 2018	Cincinnati Masters, United States	Masters 1000	Hard	(United Kingdom) Jamie Murray	(Colombia) Juan Sebastián Cabal (Colombia) Robert Farah	4–6, 6–3, [10–6]
Loss	29–28	Oct 2018	Shanghai Masters, China	Masters 1000	Hard	(United Kingdom) Jamie Murray	(Poland) Łukasz Kubot (Brazil) Marcelo Melo	4–6, 2–6
Win	30–28	Jan 2019	Sydney International, Australia (2)	250 Series	Hard	(United Kingdom) Jamie Murray	(Colombia) Juan Sebastián Cabal (Colombia) Robert Farah	6–4, 6–3
Loss	30–29	Apr 2019	Barcelona Open, Spain	500 Series	Clay	(United Kingdom) Jamie Murray	(Colombia) Juan Sebastián Cabal (Colombia) Robert Farah	4–6, 6–7^{(4–7)}
Win	31–29	Jun 2019	Stuttgart Open, Germany (2)	250 Series	Grass	(Australia) John Peers	(India) Rohan Bopanna (Canada) Denis Shapovalov	7–5, 6–3
Win	32–29	Oct 2019	Shanghai Masters, China	Masters 1000	Hard	(Croatia) Mate Pavić	(Poland) Łukasz Kubot (Brazil) Marcelo Melo	6–4, 6–2
Loss	32–30	Oct 2019	Stockholm Open, Sweden	250 Series	Hard (i)	(Croatia) Mate Pavić	(Finland) Henri Kontinen (France) Édouard Roger-Vasselin	4–6, 2–6
Win	33–30	Sep 2020	US Open, United States (2)	Grand Slam	Hard	(Croatia) Mate Pavić	(Netherlands) Wesley Koolhof (Croatia) Nikola Mektić	7–5, 6–3
Loss	33–31	Oct 2020	French Open, France	Grand Slam	Clay	(Croatia) Mate Pavić	(Germany) Kevin Krawietz (Germany) Andreas Mies	3–6, 5–7
Loss	33–32	Nov 2020	Paris Masters, France	Masters 1000	Hard (i)	(Croatia) Mate Pavić	(Canada) Félix Auger-Aliassime (Poland) Hubert Hurkacz	7–6^{(7–3)}, 6–7^{(7–9)}, [2–10]
Win	34–32	Feb 2021	Great Ocean Road Open, Australia	250 Series	Hard	(United Kingdom) Jamie Murray	(Colombia) Juan Sebastián Cabal (Colombia) Robert Farah	6–3, 7–6^{(9–7)}
Loss	34–33	Sep 2021	US Open, United States	Grand Slam	Hard	(United Kingdom) Jamie Murray	(United States) Rajeev Ram (United Kingdom) Joe Salisbury	6–3, 2–6, 2–6
Win	35–33	Oct 2021	St. Petersburg Open, Russia	250 Series	Hard (i)	(United Kingdom) Jamie Murray	(Kazakhstan) Andrey Golubev (Monaco) Hugo Nys	6–3, 6–4
Loss	35–34	Feb 2022	Rio Open, Brazil	500 Series	Clay	(United Kingdom) Jamie Murray	(Italy) Simone Bolelli (Italy) Fabio Fognini	5–7, 7–6^{(7–2)}, [6–10]

== Performance timelines ==
Key
W	F	SF	QF	#R	RR	Q#	P#	DNQ	A	Z#	PO	G	S	B	NMS	NTI	P	NH

(W) winner; (F) finalist; (SF) semifinalist; (QF) quarterfinalist; (#R) rounds 4, 3, 2, 1; (RR) round-robin stage; (Q#) qualification round; (P#) preliminary round; (DNQ) did not qualify; (A) absent; (Z#) Davis/Fed Cup Zonal Group (with number indication) or (PO) play-off; (G) gold, (S) silver or (B) bronze Olympic/Paralympic medal; (NMS) not a Masters tournament; (NTI) not a Tier I tournament; (P) postponed; (NH) not held; (SR) strike rate (events won / competed); (W–L) win–loss record.
To avoid confusion and double counting, these charts are updated at the conclusion of a tournament or when the player's participation has ended.

=== Doubles ===
Tournament	2005	2006	2007	2008	2009	2010	2011	2012	2013	2014	2015	2016	2017	2018	2019	2020	2021	2022	SR	W–L
Grand Slam tournaments
Australian Open	A	A	A	A	3R	1R	1R	QF	2R	3R	2R	W	1R	2R	QF	3R	SF	3R	1 / 14	27–13
French Open	A	A	A	SF	QF	QF	2R	3R	SF	2R	QF	3R	QF	2R	1R	F	3R	2R	0 / 15	35–15
Wimbledon	A	A	A	1R	QF	2R	2R	2R	3R	QF	QF	QF	2R	QF	2R	NH	2R	3R	0 / 14	25–14
US Open	A	A	A	QF	2R	3R	2R	QF	F	QF	1R	W	QF	QF	2R	W	F	2R	2 / 15	42–13
Win–loss	0–0	0–0	0–0	7–3	9–4	6–4	3–4	9–4	12–4	9–4	7–4	17–2	7–4	8–4	5–4	12–2	12–4	6–4	3 / 58	129–55
Year-end championships
ATP Finals	Did not qualify								SF	RR	DNQ	SF	SF	SF	DNQ	RR	RR	DNQ	0 / 7	13–12
ATP Masters Series
Indian Wells	A	A	A	A	1R	1R	1R	1R	SF	F	1R	QF	SF	2R	1R	NH	1R	1R	0 / 13	13–13
Miami	A	A	A	A	QF	1R	1R	1R	1R	QF	SF	1R	QF	2R	2R	NH	2R	1R	0 / 13	12–13
Monte Carlo	A	A	A	A	2R	QF	F	1R	2R	QF	QF	F	QF	2R	SF	NH	A	A	0 / 11	13–11
Rome	A	A	A	A	SF	2R	A	A	2R	2R	2R	QF	2R	SF	1R	QF	1R	A	0 / 11	7–11
Madrid (Stuttgart)	A	A	A	A	SF	1R	2R	A	F	QF	1R	2R	QF	QF	QF	NH	1R	A	0 / 11	11–11
Canada	A	A	A	A	2R	A	2R	A	W	W	SF	F	2R	2R	1R	NH	A	1R	2 / 10	14–8
Cincinnati	A	A	A	A	2R	A	2R	2R	QF	QF	2R	2R	F	W	SF	1R	A	2R	1 / 12	17–11
Shanghai	Not Held				2R	A	QF	2R	A	QF	1R	QF	SF	F	W	Not Held			1 / 9	13–8
Paris	A	A	A	QF	2R	A	QF	QF	F	2R	2R	2R	SF	2R	1R	F	SF	A	0 / 13	17–13
Win–loss	0–0	0–0	0–0	1–1	7–9	0–5	11–8	2–6	14–7	14–8	8–9	10–9	14–9	12–8	14–8	5–3	4–5	1–4	4 / 103	117–99
Career statistics
	2005	2006	2007	2008	2009	2010	2011	2012	2013	2014	2015	2016	2017	2018	2019	2020	2021	2022	Career	
Titles	0	0	0	1	1	1	2	5	6	2	2	3	3	3	3	1	2	1	36	
Finals	0	0	0	2	2	4	5	6	11	7	3	5	6	6	5	3	3	1	69	
Overall win–loss	1–0	0–0	0–0	21–14	28–29	29–29	42–28	43–23	61–20	45–25	38–26	50–24	50–23	40–19	37–21	22–11	25–16	13–16	545–324	63%
Year-end ranking	241	1637	192	23	22	35	19	19	3	10	22	3	10	7	21	6	16	88	$ 6,948,824	

=== Mixed doubles ===
Tournament	2008	2009	2010	2011	2012	2013	2014	2015	2016	2017	2018	2019	2020	2021	2022	SR	W–L
Grand Slam tournaments
Australian Open	A	1R	1R	A	QF	2R	QF	SF	W	2R	SF	SF	2R	2R	A	1 / 12	22–9
French Open	A	QF	2R	QF	1R	QF	SF	1R	QF	1R	A	SF	NH	1R	QF	0 / 12	17–12
Wimbledon	1R	2R	3R	1R	2R	F	QF	QF	2R	SF	QF	QF	NH	A	2R	0 / 13	20–11
US Open	A	1R	1R	QF	W	SF	W	1R	QF	QF	2R	2R	NH	1R	A	2 / 12	21–10
Win–loss	0–1	3–4	3–4	4–3	8–3	10–3	12–3	5–4	9–2	6–3	6–2	9–4	1–1	1–3	3–2	3 / 49	80–42

== Notes ==
Awards
Preceded by (Netherlands) Jean-Julien Rojer & (Romania) Horia Tecău	ATP Doubles Team of the Year (with (United Kingdom) Jamie Murray); 2016	Succeeded by (Poland) Łukasz Kubot & (Brazil) Marcelo Melo
Preceded by (Netherlands) Jean-Julien Rojer & (Romania) Horia Tecău	ITF Men's Doubles World Champion (with (United Kingdom) Jamie Murray); 2016	Succeeded by (Poland) Łukasz Kubot & (Brazil) Marcelo Melo
