= Robert Farah =

Colombian tennis player (born 1987)

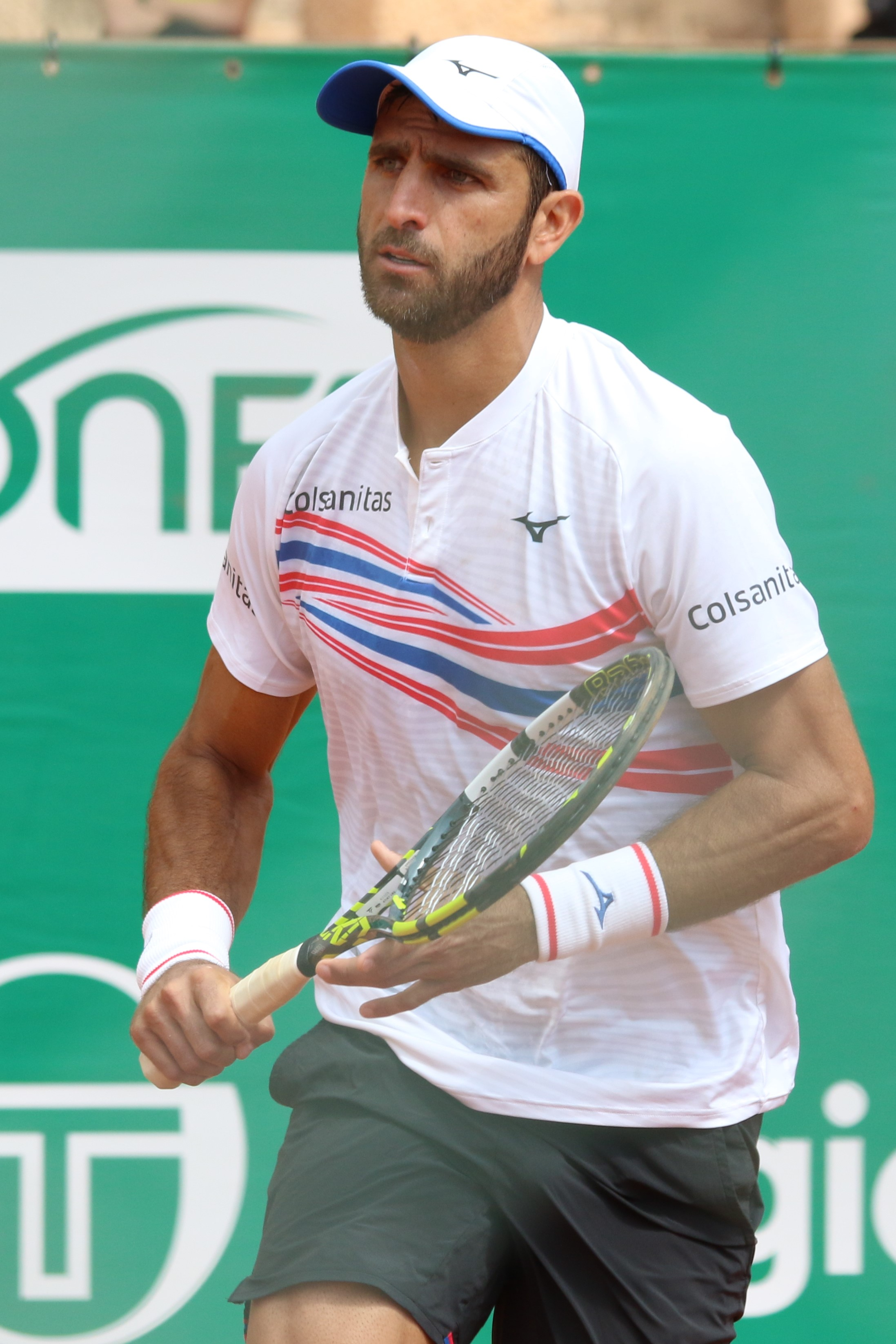
- Farah at the 2023 Monte-Carlo Masters
- Country (sports): Colombia
- Residence: Pereira, Colombia
- Born: 20 January 1987 (age 39) Montreal, Quebec, Canada
- Height: 1.93 m (6 ft 4 in)
- Turned pro: 2010
- Retired: 2023
- Plays: Right-handed (two-handed backhand)
- College: University of Southern California
- Prize money: $4,924,608

Singles
- Career record: 4–9 (at ATP Tour and Grand Slam level, and in Davis Cup)
- Career titles: 0
- Highest ranking: No. 163 (6 June 2011)

Grand Slam singles results
- Australian Open: Q2 (2011)
- French Open: Q2 (2011, 2012)
- Wimbledon: Q2 (2011, 2012)
- US Open: 1R (2011)

Doubles
- Career record: 354–223 (at ATP Tour and Grand Slam level, and in Davis Cup)
- Career titles: 19
- Highest ranking: No. 1 (15 July 2019)

Grand Slam doubles results
- Australian Open: F (2018)
- French Open: SF (2017, 2019, 2020, 2021)
- Wimbledon: W (2019)
- US Open: W (2019)

Other doubles tournaments
- Tour Finals: SF (2018, 2019)
- Olympic Games: QF (2021)

Grand Slam mixed doubles results
- Australian Open: QF (2019)
- French Open: F (2017)
- Wimbledon: F (2016)
- US Open: SF (2016)
Medal record
Representing Colombia
Men's tennis
Pan American Games
| Gold medal – first place | 2011 Guadalajara | Singles |
| Gold medal – first place | 2011 Guadalajara | Doubles |

Robert Charbel Farah Maksoud (Spanish pronunciation: [ˈroβeɾt ˈfaɾa]; born 20 January 1987) is a Colombian former professional tennis player. A world No. 1 in doubles, he also reached a career-high singles ranking of No. 163 in June 2011.

Farah is a two-time Grand Slam Champion, having won both the 2019 Wimbledon Championships (the first Hispanic duo to accomplish the feat) alongside compatriot Juan Sebastián Cabal and the 2019 US Open. The pair also finished runners-up at the 2018 Australian Open, and Farah reached the final in mixed doubles at the 2016 Wimbledon Championships and 2017 French Open with Anna-Lena Grönefeld.

Farah won 19 doubles titles on the ATP Tour, including two at the Masters 1000 level, and became world No. 1 in doubles for the first time on 15 July 2019. He spent a total of 68 weeks at the top of the doubles rankings, and was year-end No. 1 in both 2019 and 2020. Farah represented Colombia in the Davis Cup from 2010 to his retirement, as well as at the 2016 and at the 2020 Olympic Games.

== Early life and background ==
Farah was born on 20 January 1987 in Montreal, Quebec, Canada, to a Catholic Lebanese family. His parents immigrated to Canada in 1986, escaping the Lebanese Civil War, leading Robert to be born there. Later, the family relocated to Cali, Colombia, where his father's family lived, when Robert was 3 months old. Farah studied at the French Lyceum.

Tennis has been part of his family for generations. Farah is the son of retired tennis player Patrick Farah, who introduced Robert to tennis at the age of 3. Patrick's father was a 1950s tennis champion, and Robert's great-aunt Nena Farah was a tennis champion in the 1930s. His sister, Romy Farah, is a former professional tennis player.

== College career ==
Farah played college tennis at the University of Southern California from 2006 to 2010 where he won two NCAA Division I Men's Tennis Championships as a USC Trojan. He finished his Senior season (2010) as the No. 1 ranked NCAA D1 player in the US in singles, while additionally ranked 2nd in doubles. He won the 2008 NCAA Men's Doubles National Championship, partnering Kaes Van't Hof. He occasionally played doubles at USC with future ATP pro Steve Johnson.

== Professional career ==
=== 2011 ===
Farah's consistent doubles partnership with fellow countryman Juan Sebastián Cabal began at Wimbledon 2011, when they defeated the pair consisting of Pakistani Aisam Qureshi (8 in doubles) and Indian Rohan Bopanna (9 in the world), in a tight three set match that went to 21–19 in the final set, before losing in second round against American Michael Russell and Kazakhstani Mikhail Kukushkin in straight sets.

=== 2013 ===
In the 2013 Australian Open, Farah and Cabal made their first appearance in the quarterfinals.

=== 2016 ===
In 2016, Farah reached his first grand slam final, in the mixed doubles at Wimbledon partnering Anna-Lena Grönefeld. They lost in straight sets to Henri Kontinen of Finland and Heather Watson of the UK.

=== 2017 ===
In 2017, Farah and Cabal reached their first men's doubles grand slam semifinal at the French Open. In the same tournament he reached the final of the mixed doubles partnering Gronefeld where they lost to Rohan Bopanna and Gabriela Dabrowski in 3 sets.

=== 2019: Two Grand Slam and Second Masters titles, World No. 1 ===
Farah and countryman Cabal won their first ever Grand Slam men's doubles title at Wimbledon in 2019, defeating Frenchmen Nicolas Mahut and Édouard Roger-Vasselin in a thrilling 5 set match that required 4 tie-break sets; this victory helped Farah and Cabal to both ascend to world No. 1 in the week following the conclusion of the Championships.

=== 2022-23: Two Masters finals, Retirement ===
Farah made his last ATP tour-level professional appearance at the 2023 US Open (tennis) with Cabal where they lost in the second round.

== Post retirement ==
In July 2026, Robert Farah joined the cooking reality show MasterChef Celebrity Colombia as a contestant.

== Personal life ==
Farah has been in a relationship with Spanish former professional golfer Belén Mozo since 2007, and they got married on 5 December 2020. Together, they are parents to two children.

In June 2026, Farah endorsed presidential candidate Abelardo de la Espriella and urged people to vote for him in Colombia's 2026 presidential election.

== Controversies ==
In July 2018, Farah was given a suspended three months ban and fined £3,800 for promoting a gambling website on his Twitter account. Farah would only serve the suspension if there were further breaches of the Tennis Anti-Corruption Program.

In October 2019, Farah was tested positive for the anabolic steroid Boldenone. He was provisionally suspended from official tournaments from 14 January 2020 and did not compete at the 2020 Australian Open. Farah argued that he had ingested Boldenone from contaminated Colombian meat and the ITF chose not to ban him, holding that he "bears no fault or negligence for the violation".

== Performance timelines ==
Key
| W | F | SF | QF | #R | RR | Q# | P# | DNQ | A | Z# | PO | G | S | B | NMS | NTI | P | NH |

(W) winner; (F) finalist; (SF) semifinalist; (QF) quarterfinalist; (#R) rounds 4, 3, 2, 1; (RR) round-robin stage; (Q#) qualification round; (P#) preliminary round; (DNQ) did not qualify; (A) absent; (Z#) Davis/Fed Cup Zonal Group (with number indication) or (PO) play-off; (G) gold, (S) silver or (B) bronze Olympic/Paralympic medal; (NMS) not a Masters tournament; (NTI) not a Tier I tournament; (P) postponed; (NH) not held; (SR) strike rate (events won / competed); (W–L) win–loss record.
To avoid confusion and double counting, these charts are updated at the conclusion of a tournament or when the player's participation has ended.

=== Doubles ===
Current through the 2023 US Open.

| Tournament | 2010 | 2011 | 2012 | 2013 | 2014 | 2015 | 2016 | 2017 | 2018 | 2019 | 2020 | 2021 | 2022 | 2023 | SR | W-L |
|---|---|---|---|---|---|---|---|---|---|---|---|---|---|---|---|---|
Grand Slam tournaments
| Australian Open | A | A | 2R | QF | 1R | 2R | 3R | 3R | F | 1R | A | 2R | 2R | 3R | 0 / 11 | 18–11 |
| French Open | A | A | 3R | 3R | 1R | 1R | 1R | SF | QF | SF | SF | SF | 1R | 2R | 0 / 12 | 24–12 |
| Wimbledon | A | 3R | 1R | 3R | A | 2R | 2R | 2R | 3R | W | NH | QF | SF | 1R | 1 / 11 | 22–10 |
| US Open | A | 2R | 1R | 1R | 2R | 2R | 1R | A | SF | W | 2R | 1R | SF | 2R | 1 / 12 | 19–11 |
| Win–loss | 0–0 | 3–2 | 3–4 | 7–4 | 1–3 | 3–4 | 3–4 | 7–3 | 14–4 | 16–2 | 5–2 | 8–4 | 9–4 | 4–4 | 2 / 46 | 83-44 |
Year-end championship
| ATP Finals | did not qualify | | | | | | | | SF | SF | DNQ | RR | DNQ | | 0 / 3 | 4–7 |
National representation
| Summer Olympics | not held | | A | not held | | | 2R | not held | | | | QF | not held | | 0 / 2 | 3–2 |
| Davis Cup | PO | Z1 | Z1 | PO | PO | PO | Z1 | PO | PO | RR | RR | | PO | QR | 0 / 2 | 16–8 |
ATP Tour Masters 1000
| Indian Wells Masters | A | A | A | A | A | 2R | 1R | A | 1R | QF | NH | 1R | 2R | 1R | 0 / 7 | 4–7 |
| Miami Open | A | A | A | A | F | 2R | A | 1R | QF | 2R | NH | 2R | 1R | 2R | 0 / 8 | 9–8 |
| Monte-Carlo Masters | A | A | A | A | 2R | 1R | SF | A | QF | 2R | NH | SF | F | 2R | 0 / 8 | 14–8 |
| Madrid Open | A | A | A | A | SF | A | 1R | 2R | SF | 1R | NH | 2R | F | 1R | 0 / 8 | 9–8 |
| Italian Open | A | A | A | A | 1R | QF | 1R | A | W | W | 2R | 1R | 2R | 1R | 2 / 9 | 13–7 |
| Canadian Open | A | A | A | A | A | A | A | A | 2R | 1R | NH | QF | 1R | A | 0 / 4 | 1–4 |
| Cincinnati Masters | A | A | A | A | A | 2R | A | A | F | F | 1R | SF | 1R | A | 0 / 6 | 9–6 |
| Shanghai Masters | A | A | A | A | QF | QF | 2R | 2R | SF | QF | not held | | | A | 0 / 6 | 10–6 |
| Paris Masters | A | A | A | A | 2R | 2R | 1R | 2R | 2R | 2R | 2R | QF | A | A | 0 / 8 | 5–8 |
| Win–loss | 0–0 | 0–0 | 0–0 | 0–0 | 11–6 | 8–7 | 4–6 | 3–4 | 13–8 | 16–8 | 1–3 | 7–8 | 9–7 | 2–5 | 2 / 64 | 74–62 |
Career statistics
| Titles | 0 | 0 | 0 | 0 | 2 | 2 | 4 | 2 | 1 | 5 | 0 | 3 | 0 | 0 | 19 | |
| Finals | 0 | 0 | 1 | 1 | 6 | 5 | 5 | 5 | 4 | 7 | 2 | 4 | 2 | 0 | 42 | |
| Overall win–loss | 0–1 | 4–3 | 16–14 | 21–17 | 35–20 | 37–24 | 33–21 | 33–15 | 39–23 | 51–20 | 14–10 | 38–20 | 24–20 | 7–15 | 353-223 | |
| Year-end ranking | 160 | 83 | 64 | 48 | 23 | 27 | 30 | 27 | 5 | 1 | 1 | 10 | 29 | 129 | 61% | |

=== Mixed doubles ===
| Tournament | 2011 | 2012 | 2013 | 2014 | 2015 | 2016 | 2017 | 2018 | 2019 | 2020 | 2021 | 2022 | 2023 | SR | W–L |
|---|---|---|---|---|---|---|---|---|---|---|---|---|---|---|---|
Grand Slam tournaments
| Australian Open | A | A | A | A | 1R | 2R | 1R | 1R | QF | A | 2R | 1R | A | 0 / 7 | 4–6 |
| French Open | A | A | A | 2R | 2R | 1R | F | SF | 2R | NH | QF | A | A | 0 / 7 | 11–7 |
| Wimbledon | A | 1R | 2R | 1R | A | F | A | 2R | A | NH | A | QF | A | 0 / 6 | 7–6 |
| US Open | A | A | A | 2R | 1R | SF | A | A | A | NH | A | A | A | 0 / 3 | 4–3 |
| Win–loss | 0–0 | 0–1 | 1–1 | 2–3 | 1–3 | 8–4 | 4–2 | 3–3 | 3–2 | 0–0 | 2–1 | 2–2 | 0–0 | 0 / 23 | 26–22 |

== Major finals ==
=== Grand Slam finals ===
==== Doubles: 3 (2 titles, 1 runner-up) ====
| Result | Date | Tournament | Surface | Partner | Opponents | Score |
|---|---|---|---|---|---|---|
| Loss | 2018 | Australian Open | Hard | (Colombia) Juan Sebastián Cabal | (Austria) Oliver Marach (Croatia) Mate Pavić | 4–6, 4–6 |
| Win | 2019 | Wimbledon | Grass | (Colombia) Juan Sebastián Cabal | (France) Nicolas Mahut (France) Édouard Roger-Vasselin | 6–7^{(5–7)}, 7–6^{(7–5)}, 7–6^{(8–6)}, 6–7^{(5–7)}, 6–3 |
| Win | 2019 | US Open | Hard | (Colombia) Juan Sebastián Cabal | (Spain) Marcel Granollers (Argentina) Horacio Zeballos | 6–4, 7–5 |

==== Mixed doubles: 2 (2 runners-up) ====
| Result | Date | Tournament | Surface | Partner | Opponents | Score |
|---|---|---|---|---|---|---|
| Loss | 2016 | Wimbledon | Grass | (Germany) Anna-Lena Grönefeld | (United Kingdom) Heather Watson (Finland) Henri Kontinen | 6–7^{(5–7)}, 4–6 |
| Loss | 2017 | French Open | Clay | (Germany) Anna-Lena Grönefeld | (Canada) Gabriela Dabrowski (India) Rohan Bopanna | 6–2, 2–6, [10–12] |

=== Masters 1000 finals ===
==== Doubles: 7 (2 titles, 5 runner-ups) ====
| Result | Date | Tournament | Surface | Partner | Opponents | Score |
|---|---|---|---|---|---|---|
| Loss | 2014 | Miami Open | Hard | (Colombia) Juan Sebastián Cabal | (United States) Bob Bryan (United States) Mike Bryan | 6–7^{(8–10)}, 4–6 |
| Win | 2018 | Italian Open | Clay | (Colombia) Juan Sebastián Cabal | (Spain) Pablo Carreño Busta (Portugal) João Sousa | 3–6, 6–4, [10–4] |
| Loss | 2018 | Cincinnati Masters | Hard | (Colombia) Juan Sebastián Cabal | (United Kingdom) Jamie Murray (Brazil) Bruno Soares | 6–4, 3–6, [6–10] |
| Win | 2019 | Italian Open (2) | Clay | (Colombia) Juan Sebastián Cabal | (South Africa) Raven Klaasen (New Zealand) Michael Venus | 6–1, 6–3 |
| Loss | 2019 | Cincinnati Masters | Hard | (Colombia) Juan Sebastián Cabal | (Croatia) Ivan Dodig (Slovakia) Filip Polášek | 6–4, 4–6, [6–10] |
| Loss | 2022 | Monte-Carlo Masters | Clay | (Colombia) Juan Sebastián Cabal | (United States) Rajeev Ram (United Kingdom) Joe Salisbury | 4–6, 6–3, [7–10] |
| Loss | 2022 | Madrid Open | Clay | (Colombia) Juan Sebastián Cabal | (Netherlands) Wesley Koolhof (United Kingdom) Neal Skupski | 7–6^{(7–4)}, 4–6, [5–10] |

== ATP career finals ==
=== Doubles: 42 (19 titles, 23 runner-ups) ===
| Legend Grand Slam tournaments (2–1) ATP World Tour Finals (0–0) ATP World Tour Masters 1000 (2–5) ATP World Tour 500 Series (6–4) ATP World Tour 250 Series (9–13) | Finals by surface Hard (5–9) Clay (12–14) Grass (2–0) | Finals by setting Outdoor (16–22) Indoor (3–1) |

| Result | W–L | Date | Tournament | Tier | Surface | Partner | Opponents | Score |
|---|---|---|---|---|---|---|---|---|
| Loss | 0–1 | Jul 2012 | Swiss Open, Switzerland | 250 Series | Clay | (Colombia) Santiago Giraldo | (Spain) Marcel Granollers (Spain) Marc López | 4–6, 6–7^{(9–11)} |
| Loss | 0–2 | May 2013 | Open de Nice Côte d'Azur, France | 250 Series | Clay | (Colombia) Juan Sebastián Cabal | (Sweden) Johan Brunström (South Africa) Raven Klaasen | 3–6, 2–6 |
| Loss | 0–3 | Jan 2014 | Brisbane International, Australia | 250 Series | Hard | (Colombia) Juan Sebastián Cabal | (Poland) Mariusz Fyrstenberg (Canada) Daniel Nestor | 7–6^{(7–4)}, 4–6, [7–10] |
| Loss | 0–4 | Feb 2014 | Chile Open, Chile | 250 Series | Clay | (Colombia) Juan Sebastián Cabal | (Austria) Oliver Marach (Romania) Florin Mergea | 3–6, 4–6 |
| Win | 1–4 | Feb 2014 | Rio Open, Brazil | 500 Series | Clay | (Colombia) Juan Sebastián Cabal | (Spain) David Marrero (Brazil) Marcelo Melo | 6–4, 6–2 |
| Loss | 1–5 | Mar 2014 | Brasil Open, Brazil | 250 Series | Clay (i) | (Colombia) Juan Sebastián Cabal | (Spain) Guillermo García-López (Austria) Philipp Oswald | 7–5, 4–6, [13–15] |
| Loss | 1–6 | Mar 2014 | Miami Open, United States | Masters 1000 | Hard | (Colombia) Juan Sebastián Cabal | (United States) Bob Bryan (United States) Mike Bryan | 6–7^{(8–10)}, 4–6 |
| Win | 2–6 | Aug 2014 | Winston-Salem Open, United States | 250 Series | Hard | (Colombia) Juan Sebastián Cabal | (United Kingdom) Jamie Murray (Australia) John Peers | 6–3, 6–4 |
| Win | 3–6 | Feb 2015 | Brasil Open, Brazil | 250 Series | Clay (i) | (Colombia) Juan Sebastián Cabal | (Italy) Paolo Lorenzi (Argentina) Diego Schwartzman | 6–4, 6–2 |
| Win | 4–6 | May 2015 | Geneva Open, Switzerland | 250 Series | Clay | (Colombia) Juan Sebastián Cabal | (South Africa) Raven Klaasen (Chinese Taipei) Lu Yen-hsun | 7–5, 4–6, [10–7] |
| Loss | 4–7 | Jul 2015 | Swedish Open, Sweden | 250 Series | Clay | (Colombia) Juan Sebastián Cabal | (France) Jérémy Chardy (Poland) Łukasz Kubot | 7–6^{(8–6)}, 3–6, [8–10] |
| Loss | 4–8 | Aug 2015 | German Open, Germany | 500 Series | Clay | (Colombia) Juan Sebastián Cabal | (United Kingdom) Jamie Murray (Australia) John Peers | 6–2, 3–6, [8–10] |
| Loss | 4–9 | Oct 2015 | Japan Open, Japan | 500 Series | Hard | (Colombia) Juan Sebastián Cabal | (South Africa) Raven Klaasen (Brazil) Marcelo Melo | 6–7^{(5–7)}, 6–3, [7–10] |
| Win | 5–9 | Feb 2016 | Argentina Open, Argentina | 250 Series | Clay | (Colombia) Juan Sebastián Cabal | (Spain) Íñigo Cervantes (Italy) Paolo Lorenzi | 6–3, 6–0 |
| Win | 6–9 | Feb 2016 | Rio Open, Brazil (2) | 500 Series | Clay | (Colombia) Juan Sebastián Cabal | (Spain) Pablo Carreño Busta (Spain) David Marrero | 7–6^{(7–5)}, 6–1 |
| Loss | 6–10 | May 2016 | Bavarian International, Germany | 250 Series | Clay | (Colombia) Juan Sebastián Cabal | (Finland) Henri Kontinen (Australia) John Peers | 3–6, 6–3, [7–10] |
| Win | 7–10 | May 2016 | Open de Nice Côte d'Azur, France | 250 Series | Clay | (Colombia) Juan Sebastián Cabal | (Croatia) Mate Pavić (New Zealand) Michael Venus | 4–6, 6–4, [10–8] |
| Win | 8–10 | Oct 2016 | Kremlin Cup, Russia | 250 Series | Hard (i) | (Colombia) Juan Sebastián Cabal | (Austria) Julian Knowle (Austria) Jürgen Melzer | 7–5, 4–6, [10–5] |
| Win | 9–10 | Feb 2017 | Argentina Open, Argentina (2) | 250 Series | Clay | (Colombia) Juan Sebastián Cabal | (Mexico) Santiago González (Spain) David Marrero | 6–1, 6–4 |
| Loss | 9–11 | Feb 2017 | Rio Open, Brazil | 500 Series | Clay | (Colombia) Juan Sebastián Cabal | (Spain) Pablo Carreño Busta (Uruguay) Pablo Cuevas | 4–6, 7–5, [8–10] |
| Loss | 9–12 | Apr 2017 | Hungarian Open, Hungary | 250 Series | Clay | (Colombia) Juan Sebastián Cabal | (United States) Brian Baker (Croatia) Nikola Mektić | 6–7^{(2–7)}, 4–6 |
| Win | 10–12 | May 2017 | Bavarian International, Germany | 250 Series | Clay | (Colombia) Juan Sebastián Cabal | (France) Jérémy Chardy (France) Fabrice Martin | 6–3, 6–3 |
| Loss | 10–13 | May 2017 | Geneva Open, Switzerland | 250 Series | Clay | (Colombia) Juan Sebastián Cabal | (Netherlands) Jean-Julien Rojer (Romania) Horia Tecău | 6–2, 6–7^{(9–11)}, [6–10] |
| Loss | 10–14 | Jan 2018 | Australian Open, Australia | Grand Slam | Hard | (Colombia) Juan Sebastián Cabal | (Austria) Oliver Marach (Croatia) Mate Pavić | 4–6, 4–6 |
| Loss | 10–15 | Feb 2018 | Argentina Open, Argentina | 250 Series | Clay | (Colombia) Juan Sebastián Cabal | (Argentina) Andrés Molteni (Argentina) Horacio Zeballos | 3–6, 7–5, [3–10] |
| Win | 11–15 | May 2018 | Italian Open, Italy | Masters 1000 | Clay | (Colombia) Juan Sebastián Cabal | (Spain) Pablo Carreño Busta (Portugal) João Sousa | 3–6, 6–4, [10–4] |
| Loss | 11–16 | Aug 2018 | Cincinnati Masters, United States | Masters 1000 | Hard | (Colombia) Juan Sebastián Cabal | (United Kingdom) Jamie Murray (Brazil) Bruno Soares | 6–4, 3–6, [6–10] |
| Loss | 11–17 | Jan 2019 | Sydney International, Australia | 250 Series | Hard | (Colombia) Juan Sebastián Cabal | (United Kingdom) Jamie Murray (Brazil) Bruno Soares | 4–6, 3–6 |
| Win | 12–17 | Apr 2019 | Barcelona Open, Spain | 500 Series | Clay | (Colombia) Juan Sebastián Cabal | (United Kingdom) Jamie Murray (Brazil) Bruno Soares | 6–4, 7–6^{(7–4)} |
| Win | 13–17 | May 2019 | Italian Open, Italy (2) | Masters 1000 | Clay | (Colombia) Juan Sebastián Cabal | (South Africa) Raven Klaasen (New Zealand) Michael Venus | 6–1, 6–3 |
| Win | 14–17 | Jun 2019 | Eastbourne International, United Kingdom | 250 Series | Grass | (Colombia) Juan Sebastián Cabal | (Argentina) Maximo González (Argentina) Horacio Zeballos | 3–6, 7–6^{(7–4)}, [10–6] |
| Win | 15–17 | Jul 2019 | Wimbledon Championships, United Kingdom | Grand Slam | Grass | (Colombia) Juan Sebastián Cabal | (France) Nicolas Mahut (France) Édouard Roger-Vasselin | 6–7^{(5–7)}, 7–6^{(7–5)}, 7–6^{(8–6)}, 6–7^{(5–7)}, 6–3 |
| Loss | 15–18 | Aug 2019 | Cincinnati Masters, United States | Masters 1000 | Hard | (Colombia) Juan Sebastián Cabal | (Croatia) Ivan Dodig (Slovakia) Filip Polášek | 6–4, 4–6, [6–10] |
| Win | 16–18 | Sep 2019 | US Open, United States | Grand Slam | Hard | (Colombia) Juan Sebastián Cabal | (Spain) Marcel Granollers (Argentina) Horacio Zeballos | 6–4, 7–5 |
| Loss | 16–19 | Feb 2020 | Mexican Open, Mexico | 500 Series | Hard | (Colombia) Juan Sebastián Cabal | (Poland) Łukasz Kubot (Brazil) Marcelo Melo | 6–7^{(6–8)}, 7–6^{(7–4)}, [9–11] |
| Loss | 16–20 | Oct 2020 | Forte Village Sardegna Open, Italy | 250 Series | Clay | (Colombia) Juan Sebastián Cabal | (New Zealand) Marcus Daniell (Austria) Philipp Oswald | 3–6, 4–6 |
| Loss | 16–21 | Feb 2021 | Great Ocean Road Open, Australia | 250 Series | Hard | (Colombia) Juan Sebastián Cabal | (United Kingdom) Jamie Murray (Brazil) Bruno Soares | 3–6, 6–7^{(7–9)} |
| Win | 17–21 | Mar 2021 | Dubai Tennis Championships, United Arab Emirates | 500 Series | Hard | (Colombia) Juan Sebastián Cabal | (Croatia) Nikola Mektić (Croatia) Mate Pavić | 7–6^{(7–0)}, 7–6^{(7–4)} |
| Win | 18–21 | Apr 2021 | Barcelona Open, Spain | 500 Series | Clay | (Colombia) Juan Sebastián Cabal | (Germany) Kevin Krawietz (Romania) Horia Tecău | 6–4, 6–2 |
| Win | 19–21 | Oct 2021 | Vienna Open, Austria | 500 Series | Hard (i) | (Colombia) Juan Sebastián Cabal | (United States) Rajeev Ram (United Kingdom) Joe Salisbury | 6–4, 6–2 |
| Loss | 19–22 | Apr 2022 | Monte-Carlo Masters, Monaco | Masters 1000 | Clay | (Colombia) Juan Sebastián Cabal | (United States) Rajeev Ram (United Kingdom) Joe Salisbury | 4–6, 6–3, [7–10] |
| Loss | 19–23 | May 2022 | Madrid Open, Spain | Masters 1000 | Clay | (Colombia) Juan Sebastián Cabal | (Netherlands) Wesley Koolhof (United Kingdom) Neal Skupski | 7–6^{(7–4)}, 4–6, [5–10] |

== ATP Challenger & ITF Futures ==
=== Singles: 5 (3–2) ===
Legend
ATP Challenger Tour (1–2)
ITF Futures (2–0)

| Outcome | No. | Date | Tournament | Surface | Opponent | Score |
|---|---|---|---|---|---|---|
| Winner | 1. | 7 June 2010 | Maracaibo, Venezuela | Hard | (Peru) Iván Miranda | 6–3, 7–6^{(7–3)} |
| Winner | 2. | 21 June 2010 | Barquisimeto, Venezuela | Hard | (Ecuador) Iván Endara | 6–4, 6–2 |
| Winner | 3. | 12 July 2010 | Bogotá, Colombia | Clay | (Colombia) Carlos Salamanca | 6–3, 2–6, 7–6^{(7–3)} |
| Runner–up | 4. | 16 September 2011 | Aguascalientes, Mexico | Clay | (Colombia) Juan Sebastián Cabal | 6–4, 7–6^{(7–3)} |
| Runner–up | 5. | 6 August 2012 | Aptos, USA | Hard | (United States) Steve Johnson | 6–3, 6–3 |
