= 2018 Western & Southern Open – Men's doubles =

Men's doubles
- 2018 Western & Southern Open

Final
- Champions: (United Kingdom) Jamie Murray (Brazil) Bruno Soares
- Runners-up: (Colombia) Juan Sebastián Cabal (Colombia) Robert Farah
- Score: 4–6, 6–3, [10–6]

Details
- Draw: 24 (2 WC )
- Seeds: 8

Events
Singles	men	women
Doubles	men	women
← 2017 ·	Western & Southern Open	· 2019 →

Pierre-Hugues Herbert and Nicolas Mahut were the defending champions, but Herbert chose not to participate this year. Mahut played alongside Édouard Roger-Vasselin, but they lost in the second round to Philipp Kohlschreiber and Fernando Verdasco.

Jamie Murray and Bruno Soares won the title, defeating Juan Sebastián Cabal and Robert Farah in the final, 4–6, 6–3, [10–6].

== Seeds ==
All seeds received a bye into the second round.

1. (Austria) Oliver Marach / (Croatia) Mate Pavić (second round)
2. (United States) Mike Bryan / (United States) Jack Sock (second round)
3. (Finland) Henri Kontinen / (Australia) John Peers (quarterfinals)
4. (United Kingdom) Jamie Murray / (Brazil) Bruno Soares (champions)
5. (Poland) Łukasz Kubot / (Brazil) Marcelo Melo (quarterfinals)
6. (Netherlands) Jean-Julien Rojer / (Romania) Horia Tecău (semifinals)
7. (Colombia) Juan Sebastián Cabal / (Colombia) Robert Farah (final)
8. (France) Nicolas Mahut / (France) Édouard Roger-Vasselin (second round)

== Draw ==
=== Key ===
- Q = Qualifier
- WC = Wild card
- LL = Lucky loser
- Alt = Alternate
- ITF = ITF entry
- PR = Protected ranking
- SR = Special ranking
- SE = Special exempt
- JE = Junior exempt
- JR = Junior Accelerator Programme entrant
- CO = College Accelerator Programme entrant
- NG = Next Gen Accelerator Program entrant
- w/o = Walkover
- r = Retired
- d = Defaulted

=== Finals ===
Semifinals
7	(Colombia) Juan Sebastián Cabal (Colombia) Robert Farah	7^{7}	6
(Germany) Philipp Kohlschreiber (Spain) Fernando Verdasco	6^{5}	4
4	(United Kingdom) Jamie Murray (Brazil) Bruno Soares	6^{7}	6	[10]
6	(Netherlands) Jean-Julien Rojer (Romania) Horia Tecău	7^{9}	2	[6]

Final
7	(Colombia) Juan Sebastián Cabal (Colombia) Robert Farah	6	3	[6]
4	(United Kingdom) Jamie Murray (Brazil) Bruno Soares	4	6	[10]

=== Top half ===
First round
(Spain) P Carreño Busta (Portugal) J Sousa	3	7	[9]
(Croatia) N Mektić (Austria) A Peya	6	5	[11]
(Italy) M Cecchinato (Bosnia and Herzegovina) D Džumhur	7^{8}	3	[8]
(Japan) B McLachlan (Netherlands) M Middelkoop	6^{6}	6	[10]
(Croatia) I Dodig (Netherlands) R Haase	6	6^{5}	[10]
(New Zealand) A Sitak (Greece) S Tsitsipas	4	7^{7}	[6]
(Germany) P Kohlschreiber (Spain) F Verdasco	4	6	[10]
Alt	(Argentina) L Mayer (Spain) A Ramos Viñolas	6	2	[4]

Second round
1	(Austria) O Marach (Croatia) M Pavić	6^{3}	2
(Croatia) N Mektić (Austria) A Peya	7^{7}	6
(Japan) B McLachlan (Netherlands) M Middelkoop	5	3
7	(Colombia) JS Cabal (Colombia) R Farah	7	6
3	(Finland) H Kontinen (Australia) J Peers	4	7^{9}	[12]
(Croatia) I Dodig (Netherlands) R Haase	6	6^{7}	[10]
(Germany) P Kohlschreiber (Spain) F Verdasco	7^{8}	6^{4}	[10]
8	(France) N Mahut (France) É Roger-Vasselin	6^{6}	7^{7}	[6]

Quarterfinals
(Croatia) N Mektić (Austria) A Peya
7	(Colombia) JS Cabal (Colombia) R Farah	w/o
3	(Finland) H Kontinen (Australia) J Peers	6	6^{2}	[7]
(Germany) P Kohlschreiber (Spain) F Verdasco	2	7^{7}	[10]

Semifinals
7	(Colombia) JS Cabal (Colombia) R Farah	7^{7}	6
(Germany) P Kohlschreiber (Spain) F Verdasco	6^{5}	4

=== Bottom half ===
First round
(France) R Gasquet (France) A Mannarino	1	2
(South Africa) R Klaasen (New Zealand) M Venus	6	6
WC	(United States) R Harrison (United States) N Monroe	7^{7}	5	[10]
WC	(United States) M McDonald (Canada) D Nestor	6^{2}	7	[8]
(United States) S Querrey (United States) R Ram	7^{7}	6
(United States) S Johnson (United States) F Tiafoe	6^{2}	3
(Spain) F López (Spain) M López	6^{11}	6	[10]
(Russia) K Khachanov (France) L Pouille	7^{13}	4	[8]

Second round
5	(Poland) Ł Kubot (Brazil) M Melo	6	7^{7}
(South Africa) R Klaasen (New Zealand) M Venus	4	6^{4}
WC	(United States) R Harrison (United States) N Monroe	4	6^{9}
4	(United Kingdom) J Murray (Brazil) B Soares	6	7^{11}
6	(Netherlands) J-J Rojer (Romania) H Tecău	6	6
(United States) S Querrey (United States) R Ram	3	3
(Spain) F López (Spain) M López	6	6
2	(United States) M Bryan (United States) J Sock	3	0

Quarterfinals
5	(Poland) Ł Kubot (Brazil) M Melo	5	7^{8}	[6]
4	(United Kingdom) J Murray (Brazil) B Soares	7	6^{6}	[10]
6	(Netherlands) J-J Rojer (Romania) H Tecău	6	7
(Spain) F López (Spain) M López	3	5

Semifinals
4	(United Kingdom) J Murray (Brazil) B Soares	6^{7}	6	[10]
6	(Netherlands) J-J Rojer (Romania) H Tecău	7^{9}	2	[6]
