= 2018 Italian Open – Men's doubles =

Men's doubles
- 2018 Italian Open

Final
- Champions: (Colombia) Juan Sebastián Cabal (Colombia) Robert Farah
- Runners-up: (Spain) Pablo Carreño Busta (Portugal) João Sousa
- Score: 3–6, 6–4, [10–4]

Events
Singles	men	women
Doubles	men	women
← 2017 ·	Italian Open	· 2019 →

Pierre-Hugues Herbert and Nicolas Mahut were the defending champions but chose not to defend their title.

Łukasz Kubot and Mate Pavić were in contention for the ATP no. 1 doubles ranking at the beginning of the tournament. Pavić attained the top ranking after both he and Kubot (along with their respective partners) lost in the quarterfinals. Pavić will be the first player from Croatia (male or female) to achieve a no. 1 ranking and the youngest ATP doubles no. 1 player since 1996.

Juan Sebastián Cabal and Robert Farah won their first Masters 1000 title, defeating Pablo Carreño Busta and João Sousa in the final, 3–6, 6–4, [10–4].

== Seeds ==
All seeds receive a bye into the second round.

1. (Poland) Łukasz Kubot / (Brazil) Marcelo Melo (quarterfinals)
2. (Austria) Oliver Marach / (Croatia) Mate Pavić (quarterfinals)
3. (United States) Bob Bryan / (United States) Mike Bryan (withdrew due to Bob Bryan's hip injury)
4. (Finland) Henri Kontinen / (Australia) John Peers (quarterfinals)
5. (United Kingdom) Jamie Murray / (Brazil) Bruno Soares (semifinals)
6. (Colombia) Juan Sebastián Cabal / (Colombia) Robert Farah (champions)
7. (India) Rohan Bopanna / (France) Édouard Roger-Vasselin (second round)
8. (Spain) Feliciano López / (Spain) Marc López (quarterfinals)

== Draw ==
=== Key ===
- Q = Qualifier
- WC = Wild card
- LL = Lucky loser
- Alt = Alternate
- SE = Special exempt
- PR = Protected ranking
- ITF = ITF entry
- JE = Junior exempt
- w/o = Walkover
- r = Retired
- d = Defaulted
- SR = Special ranking

=== Finals ===
Semifinals
6	(Colombia) Juan Sebastián Cabal (Colombia) Robert Farah	7^{7}	3	[10]
5	(United Kingdom) Jamie Murray (Brazil) Bruno Soares	6^{4}	6	[8]
Alt	(Spain) Pablo Carreño Busta (Portugal) João Sousa	3	7^{7}	[10]
(Uruguay) Pablo Cuevas (Spain) Marcel Granollers	6	6^{5}	[5]

Final
6	(Colombia) Juan Sebastián Cabal (Colombia) Robert Farah	3	6	[10]
Alt	(Spain) Pablo Carreño Busta (Portugal) João Sousa	6	4	[4]

=== Top half ===
First round
(Mexico) S González (Pakistan) A-u-H Qureshi	6	6
(Argentina) D Schwartzman (Canada) D Shapovalov	2	2
(Netherlands) R Haase (Netherlands) J-J Rojer	6	6
(Chile) J Peralta (Argentina) H Zeballos	4	4
(Croatia) N Mektić (Austria) A Peya	6^{8}	4
(United States) J Isner (United States) J Sock	7^{10}	6
(United States) R Harrison (Spain) F Verdasco	2	4
(South Africa) R Klaasen (New Zealand) M Venus	6	6

Second round
1	(Poland) Ł Kubot (Brazil) M Melo	7^{7}	6^{5}	[10]
(Mexico) S González (Pakistan) A-u-H Qureshi	6^{4}	7^{7}	[2]
(Netherlands) R Haase (Netherlands) J-J Rojer	7^{7}	5	[8]
6	(Colombia) JS Cabal (Colombia) R Farah	6^{5}	7	[10]
4	(Finland) H Kontinen (Australia) J Peers	7^{7}	6
(United States) J Isner (United States) J Sock	6^{2}	3
(South Africa) R Klaasen (New Zealand) M Venus	3	4
5	(United Kingdom) J Murray (Brazil) B Soares	6	6

Quarterfinals
1	(Poland) Ł Kubot (Brazil) M Melo	3	5
6	(Colombia) JS Cabal (Colombia) R Farah	6	7
4	(Finland) H Kontinen (Australia) J Peers	4	6	[5]
5	(United Kingdom) J Murray (Brazil) B Soares	6	2	[10]

Semifinals
6	(Colombia) JS Cabal (Colombia) R Farah	7^{7}	3	[10]
5	(United Kingdom) J Murray (Brazil) B Soares	6^{4}	6	[8]

=== Bottom half ===
First round
WC	(Italy) S Bolelli (Italy) F Fognini	4	6	[9]
(Argentina) JM del Potro (Argentina) L Mayer	6	1	[11]
(United States) S Querrey (United States) R Ram	6	7
(France) A Mannarino (France) L Pouille	3	5
WC	(Italy) J Ocleppo (Italy) A Vavassori	4	4
(Uruguay) P Cuevas (Spain) M Granollers	6	6
(United States) S Johnson (Austria) D Thiem	6^{4}	6	[10]
(Germany) A Zverev (Germany) M Zverev	7^{7}	3	[7]

Second round
8	(Spain) F López (Spain) M López	w/o
(Argentina) JM del Potro (Argentina) L Mayer
(United States) S Querrey (United States) R Ram	6	3	[5]
Alt	(Spain) P Carreño Busta (Portugal) J Sousa	3	6	[10]
7	(India) R Bopanna (France) É Roger-Vasselin	6^{5}	4
(Uruguay) P Cuevas (Spain) M Granollers	7^{7}	6
(United States) S Johnson (Austria) D Thiem	6	3	[14]
2	(Austria) O Marach (Croatia) M Pavić	0	6	[16]

Quarterfinals
8	(Spain) F López (Spain) M López	6	3	[4]
Alt	(Spain) P Carreño Busta (Portugal) J Sousa	1	6	[10]
(Uruguay) P Cuevas (Spain) M Granollers	6	7^{7}
2	(Austria) O Marach (Croatia) M Pavić	3	6^{4}

Semifinals
Alt	(Spain) P Carreño Busta (Portugal) J Sousa	3	7^{7}	[10]
(Uruguay) P Cuevas (Spain) M Granollers	6	6^{5}	[5]
