= 2018 ATP Finals – Doubles =

Doubles
- 2018 ATP Finals

Final
- Champions: (United States) Mike Bryan (United States) Jack Sock
- Runners-up: (France) Pierre-Hugues Herbert (France) Nicolas Mahut
- Score: 5–7, 6–1, [13–11]

Events
Singles	Doubles
- ATP Finals

Mike Bryan and Jack Sock defeated Pierre-Hugues Herbert and Nicolas Mahut in the final, 5–7, 6–1, [13–11] to win the doubles tennis title at the 2018 ATP Finals. They saved a championship point en route to Bryan's fifth Tour Finals title, and his first with a partner other than his brother Bob Bryan. Bryan became the oldest doubles champion in the tournament's history.

Henri Kontinen and John Peers were the two-time reigning champions, but they only qualified for the first alternate spot. Kontinen and Peers replaced Nikola Mektić and Alexander Peya for the last match in the round-robin competition, but did not progress to the knockout stage.

== Seeds ==
1. (Austria) Oliver Marach / (Croatia) Mate Pavić (round robin)
2. (Colombia) Juan Sebastián Cabal / (Colombia) Robert Farah (semifinals)
3. (Poland) Łukasz Kubot / (Brazil) Marcelo Melo (round robin)
4. (United Kingdom) Jamie Murray / (Brazil) Bruno Soares (semifinals)
5. (United States) Mike Bryan / (United States) Jack Sock (champions)
6. (South Africa) Raven Klaasen / (New Zealand) Michael Venus (round robin)
7. (Croatia) Nikola Mektić / (Austria) Alexander Peya (round robin, withdrew)
8. (France) Pierre-Hugues Herbert / (France) Nicolas Mahut (final)

== Alternates ==
1. (Finland) Henri Kontinen / (Australia) John Peers (replaced Mektić/Peya, round robin)
2. (Netherlands) Jean-Julien Rojer / (Romania) Horia Tecău (Did not play)

== Draw ==
Key

- Q = Qualifier
- WC = Wild card
- LL = Lucky loser
- Alt = Alternate
- ITF = ITF entry
- PR = Protected ranking
- SR = Special ranking
- SE = Special exempt
- JE = Junior exempt
- JR = Junior Accelerator Programme entrant
- CO = College Accelerator Programme entrant
- NG = Next Gen Accelerator Program entrant
- w/o = Walkover
- r = Retired
- d = Defaulted

=== Finals ===
Semifinals
8	(France) Pierre-Hugues Herbert (France) Nicolas Mahut	6	5	[10]
2	(Colombia) Juan Sebastián Cabal (Colombia) Robert Farah	3	7	[5]
4	(United Kingdom) Jamie Murray (Brazil) Bruno Soares	3	6	[4]
5	(United States) Mike Bryan (United States) Jack Sock	6	4	[10]

Final
8	(France) Pierre-Hugues Herbert (France) Nicolas Mahut	7	1	[11]
5	(United States) Mike Bryan (United States) Jack Sock	5	6	[13]

=== Group Knowles/Nestor ===
		(Austria) Marach (Croatia) Pavić	(Poland) Kubot (Brazil) Melo	(United States) Bryan (United States) Sock	(France) Herbert (France) Mahut	RR W–L	Set W–L	Game W–L	Standings
1	(Austria) Oliver Marach (Croatia) Mate Pavić		6–7^{(4–7)}, 4–6	4–6, 6–7^{(4–7)}	6–4, 7–6^{(7–3)}	1–2	2–4	33–36	4
3	(Poland) Łukasz Kubot (Brazil) Marcelo Melo	7–6^{(7–4)}, 6–4		3–6, 6–7^{(5–7)}	2–6, 4–6	1–2	2–4	28–35	3
5	(United States) Mike Bryan (United States) Jack Sock	6–4, 7–6^{(7–4)}	6–3, 7–6^{(7–5)}		2–6, 2–6	2–1	4–2	30–31	2
8	(France) Pierre-Hugues Herbert (France) Nicolas Mahut	4–6, 6–7^{(3–7)}	6–2, 6–4	6–2, 6–2		2–1	4–2	34–23	1

=== Group Llodra/Santoro ===
		(Colombia) Cabal (Colombia) Farah	(United Kingdom) Murray (Brazil) Soares	(South Africa) Klaasen (New Zealand) Venus	(Croatia) Mektić (Austria) Peya (Finland) Kontinen (Australia) Peers	RR W–L	Set W–L	Game W–L	Standings
2	(Colombia) Juan Sebastián Cabal (Colombia) Robert Farah		4–6, 3–6	6–3, 7–6^{(7–5)}	6–3, 6–4 (w/ Mektić/Peya)	2–1	4–2	32–28	2
4	(United Kingdom) Jamie Murray (Brazil) Bruno Soares	6–4, 6–3		7–6^{(7–5)}, 4–6, [10–5]	3–6, 7–6^{(7–3)}, [10–3] (w/ Kontinen/Peers)	3–0	6–2	35–31	1
6	(South Africa) Raven Klaasen (New Zealand) Michael Venus	3–6, 6–7^{(5–7)}	6–7^{(5–7)}, 6–4, [5–10]		7–6^{(7–5)}, 7–6^{(7–5)} (w/ Mektić/Peya)	1–2	3–4	35–37	3
7 9	(Croatia) Nikola Mektić (Austria) Alexander Peya (Finland) Henri Kontinen (Australia) John Peers	3–6, 4–6 (w/ Mektić/Peya)	6–3, 6–7^{(3–7)}, [3–10] (w/ Kontinen/Peers)	6–7^{(5–7)}, 6–7^{(5–7)} (w/ Mektić/Peya)		0–2 0–1	0–4 1–2	19–26 12–11	X 4

Standings are determined by: 1. number of wins; 2. number of matches; 3. in two-player ties, head-to-head records; 4. in three-player ties, percentage of sets won, then percentage of games won, then ATP rankings.
