= 2017 Western & Southern Open – Men's doubles =

Men's doubles
- 2017 Western & Southern Open

Final
- Champions: (France) Pierre-Hugues Herbert (France) Nicolas Mahut
- Runners-up: (United Kingdom) Jamie Murray (Brazil) Bruno Soares
- Score: 7–6^{(8–6)}, 6–4

Events
Singles	men	women
Doubles	men	women
← 2016 ·	Western & Southern Open	· 2018 →

Ivan Dodig and Marcelo Melo were the defending champions, but chose not to participate together. Dodig teamed up with Rohan Bopanna, but lost in the quarterfinals to Melo who partnered Łukasz Kubot. Kubot and Melo lost in the semifinals to Jamie Murray and Bruno Soares.

Pierre-Hugues Herbert and Nicolas Mahut won the title, defeating Murray and Soares in the final, 7–6^{(8–6)}, 6–4.

By reaching the quarterfinals with John Peers, Henri Kontinen regained the ATP no. 1 doubles ranking from Melo at the end of the tournament.

== Seeds ==
All seeds received a bye into the second round.

1. (Finland) Henri Kontinen / (Australia) John Peers (quarterfinals)
2. (Poland) Łukasz Kubot / (Brazil) Marcelo Melo (semifinals)
3. (United Kingdom) Jamie Murray / (Brazil) Bruno Soares (final)
4. (United States) Bob Bryan / (United States) Mike Bryan (quarterfinals)
5. (France) Pierre-Hugues Herbert / (France) Nicolas Mahut (champions)
6. (South Africa) Raven Klaasen / (United States) Rajeev Ram (second round)
7. (India) Rohan Bopanna / (Croatia) Ivan Dodig (quarterfinals)
8. (Austria) Oliver Marach / (Croatia) Mate Pavić (second round)

== Draw ==
=== Key ===
- Q = Qualifier
- WC = Wild card
- LL = Lucky loser
- Alt = Alternate
- ITF = ITF entry
- PR = Protected ranking
- SR = Special ranking
- SE = Special exempt
- JE = Junior exempt
- JR = Junior Accelerator Programme entrant
- CO = College Accelerator Programme entrant
- NG = Next Gen Accelerator Program entrant
- w/o = Walkover
- r = Retired
- d = Defaulted

=== Finals ===
Semifinals
(United States) Ryan Harrison (New Zealand) Michael Venus	4	6^{9}
5	(France) Pierre-Hugues Herbert (France) Nicolas Mahut	6	7^{11}
3	(United Kingdom) Jamie Murray (Brazil) Bruno Soares	6	7
2	(Poland) Łukasz Kubot (Brazil) Marcelo Melo	4	5

Final
5	(France) Pierre-Hugues Herbert (France) Nicolas Mahut	7^{8}	6
3	(United Kingdom) Jamie Murray (Brazil) Bruno Soares	6^{6}	4

=== Top half ===
First round
(Spain) R Bautista Agut (Spain) D Ferrer	1	7^{7}	[10]
(Italy) P Lorenzi (Spain) A Ramos Viñolas	6	6^{2}	[6]
(United States) S Johnson (Canada) D Nestor	2	3
(United States) R Harrison (New Zealand) M Venus	6	6
(India) L Paes (Germany) A Zverev	6	6^{2}	[6]
(Spain) F López (Spain) M López	2	7^{7}	[10]
(France) F Martin (France) É Roger-Vasselin	6^{4}	6	[10]
(United States) J Isner (United States) D Young	7^{7}	3	[5]

Second round
1	(Finland) H Kontinen (Australia) J Peers	w/o
(Spain) R Bautista Agut (Spain) D Ferrer
(United States) R Harrison (New Zealand) M Venus	4	7^{7}	[12]
8	(Austria) O Marach (Croatia) M Pavić	6	6^{2}	[10]
4	(United States) B Bryan (United States) M Bryan	6	6
(Spain) F López (Spain) M López	2	3
(France) F Martin (France) É Roger-Vasselin	6	6^{5}	[5]
5	(France) P-H Herbert (France) N Mahut	3	7^{7}	[10]

Quarterfinals
1	(Finland) H Kontinen (Australia) J Peers	6^{4}	6	[10]
(United States) R Harrison (New Zealand) M Venus	7^{7}	3	[12]
4	(United States) B Bryan (United States) M Bryan	6	5	[8]
5	(France) P-H Herbert (France) N Mahut	4	7	[10]

Semifinals
(United States) R Harrison (New Zealand) M Venus	4	6^{9}
5	(France) P-H Herbert (France) N Mahut	6	7^{11}

=== Bottom half ===
First round
(Netherlands) J-J Rojer (Romania) H Tecău	6	6
WC	(United States) J Donaldson (United States) S Kozlov	3	4
(Spain) P Carreño Busta (Spain) F Verdasco	6	7
(Russia) K Khachanov (Austria) D Thiem	2	5
WC	(United States) J Sock (United States) J Withrow	6^{5}	4
(Colombia) JS Cabal (Italy) F Fognini	7^{7}	6
(Croatia) N Mektić (Pakistan) A-u-H Qureshi	6^{2}	6	[13]
(Argentina) D Schwartzman (Germany) M Zverev	7^{7}	3	[15]

Second round
6	(South Africa) R Klaasen (United States) R Ram	5	3
(Netherlands) J-J Rojer (Romania) H Tecău	7	6
(Spain) P Carreño Busta (Spain) F Verdasco	3	3
3	(United Kingdom) J Murray (Brazil) B Soares	6	6
7	(India) R Bopanna (Croatia) I Dodig	5	7	[10]
(Colombia) JS Cabal (Italy) F Fognini	7	5	[8]
(Argentina) D Schwartzman (Germany) M Zverev	5	2
2	(Poland) Ł Kubot (Brazil) M Melo	7	6

Quarterfinals
(Netherlands) J-J Rojer (Romania) H Tecău	6^{6}	4
3	(United Kingdom) J Murray (Brazil) B Soares	7^{8}	6
7	(India) R Bopanna (Croatia) I Dodig	1	7^{7}	[7]
2	(Poland) Ł Kubot (Brazil) M Melo	6	6^{5}	[10]

Semifinals
3	(United Kingdom) J Murray (Brazil) B Soares	6	7
2	(Poland) Ł Kubot (Brazil) M Melo	4	5
