= 2016 Monte-Carlo Rolex Masters – Doubles =

Doubles
- 2016 Monte-Carlo Rolex Masters

Final
- Champions: (France) Pierre-Hugues Herbert (France) Nicolas Mahut
- Runners-up: (United Kingdom) Jamie Murray (Brazil) Bruno Soares
- Score: 4–6, 6–0, [10–6]

Events
Singles	Doubles
← 2015 ·	Monte-Carlo Rolex Masters	· 2017 →

Bob and Mike Bryan were the two-time defending champions, but lost in the second round to Juan Sebastián Cabal and Robert Farah.

Pierre-Hugues Herbert and Nicolas Mahut won the title, defeating Jamie Murray and Bruno Soares in the final, 4–6, 6–0, [10–6].

== Seeds ==
All seeds received a bye into the second round.

1. (Netherlands) Jean-Julien Rojer / (Romania) Horia Tecău (second round)
2. (Croatia) Ivan Dodig / (Brazil) Marcelo Melo (semifinals)
3. (France) Pierre-Hugues Herbert / (France) Nicolas Mahut (champions)
4. (United Kingdom) Jamie Murray / (Brazil) Bruno Soares (final)
5. (United States) Bob Bryan / (United States) Mike Bryan (second round)
6. (India) Rohan Bopanna / (Romania) Florin Mergea (quarterfinals)
7. (France) Édouard Roger-Vasselin / (Serbia) Nenad Zimonjić (second round)
8. (Poland) Łukasz Kubot / (Poland) Marcin Matkowski (second round)

== Draw ==
=== Key ===
- Q = Qualifier
- WC = Wild card
- LL = Lucky loser
- Alt = Alternate
- SE = Special exempt
- PR = Protected ranking
- ITF = ITF entry
- JE = Junior exempt
- w/o = Walkover
- r = Retired
- d = Defaulted
- SR = Special ranking

=== Finals ===
Semifinals
(Colombia) Juan Sebastián Cabal (Colombia) Robert Farah	6^{7}	4
3	(France) Pierre-Hugues Herbert (France) Nicolas Mahut	7^{9}	6
4	(United Kingdom) Jamie Murray (Brazil) Bruno Soares	6	6
2	(Croatia) Ivan Dodig (Brazil) Marcelo Melo	2	4

Final
3	(France) Pierre-Hugues Herbert (France) Nicolas Mahut	4	6	[10]
4	(United Kingdom) Jamie Murray (Brazil) Bruno Soares	6	0	[6]

=== Top half ===
First round
(South Africa) R Klaasen (United States) R Ram	3	2
(Finland) H Kontinen (Australia) J Peers	6	6
(Spain) F López (Spain) M López	3	4
(Colombia) JS Cabal (Colombia) R Farah	6	6
(Germany) P Kohlschreiber (Serbia) V Troicki	4	2
WC	(Spain) R Nadal (Spain) F Verdasco	6	6
(United Kingdom) D Inglot (United Kingdom) A Murray	6	6
(Uruguay) P Cuevas (Spain) M Granollers	3	4

Second round
1	(Netherlands) J-J Rojer (Romania) H Tecău	2	3
(Finland) H Kontinen (Australia) J Peers	6	6
(Colombia) JS Cabal (Colombia) R Farah	6	6
5	(United States) B Bryan (United States) M Bryan	4	3
3	(France) P-H Herbert (France) N Mahut	w/o
WC	(Spain) R Nadal (Spain) F Verdasco
(United Kingdom) D Inglot (United Kingdom) A Murray	2	6	[10]
7	(France) É Roger-Vasselin (Serbia) N Zimonjić	6	3	[5]

Quarterfinals
(Finland) H Kontinen (Australia) J Peers	4	4
(Colombia) JS Cabal (Colombia) R Farah	6	6
3	(France) P-H Herbert (France) N Mahut	6	3	[12]
(United Kingdom) D Inglot (United Kingdom) A Murray	4	6	[10]

Semifinals
(Colombia) JS Cabal (Colombia) R Farah	6^{7}	4
3	(France) P-H Herbert (France) N Mahut	7^{9}	6

=== Bottom half ===
First round
(France) J Chardy (France) G Simon	6	3	[8]
(Sweden) R Lindstedt (Austria) A Peya	2	6	[10]
(Canada) D Nestor (Czech Republic) R Štěpánek	7^{7}	6
(France) R Gasquet (France) J-W Tsonga	6^{4}	4
WC	(Italy) F Fognini (Italy) P Lorenzi	6	6^{5}	[8]
(Philippines) T Huey (Belarus) M Mirnyi	1	7^{7}	[10]
(Austria) O Marach (Austria) D Thiem	6^{5}	6^{4}
(Spain) D Marrero (France) B Paire	7^{7}	7^{7}

Second round
6	(India) R Bopanna (Romania) F Mergea	7	7
(Sweden) R Lindstedt (Austria) A Peya	5	5
(Canada) D Nestor (Czech Republic) R Štěpánek	7^{7}	6^{9}	[12]
4	(United Kingdom) J Murray (Brazil) B Soares	6^{5}	7^{11}	[14]
8	(Poland) Ł Kubot (Poland) M Matkowski	6^{3}	3
(Philippines) T Huey (Belarus) M Mirnyi	7^{7}	6
(Spain) D Marrero (France) B Paire	6^{4}	2
2	(Croatia) I Dodig (Brazil) M Melo	7^{7}	6

Quarterfinals
6	(India) R Bopanna (Romania) F Mergea	2	3
4	(United Kingdom) J Murray (Brazil) B Soares	6	6
(Philippines) T Huey (Belarus) M Mirnyi	4	4
2	(Croatia) I Dodig (Brazil) M Melo	6	6

Semifinals
4	(United Kingdom) J Murray (Brazil) B Soares	6	6
2	(Croatia) I Dodig (Brazil) M Melo	2	4
