= Oliver Marach =

Austrian tennis player

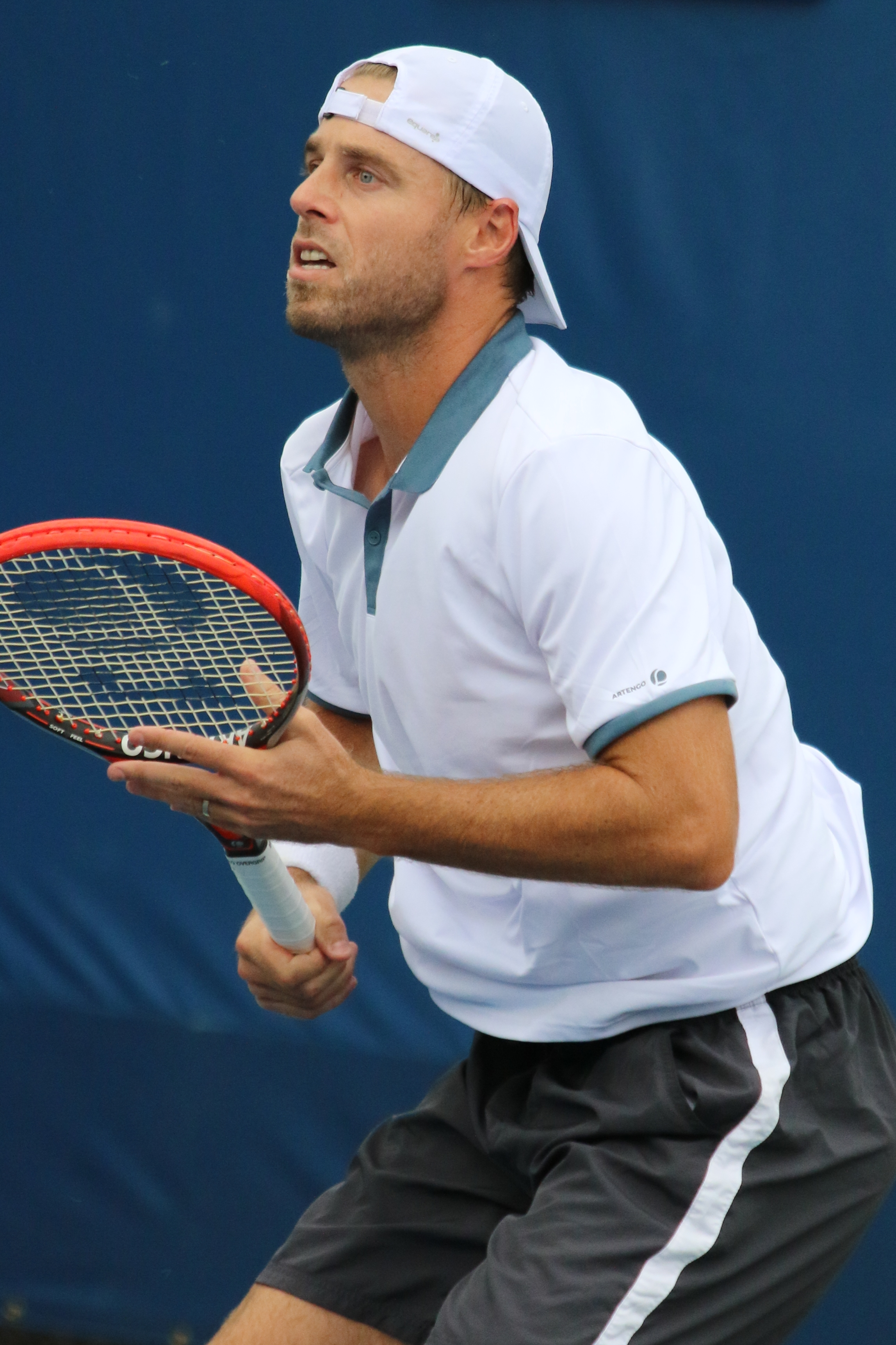
- Marach at the 2016 US Open
- Country (sports): Austria
- Residence: Panama City, Panama
- Born: 16 July 1980 (age 45) Graz, Austria
- Height: 1.85 m (6 ft 1 in)
- Turned pro: 1998
- Retired: 2022
- Plays: Right-handed (one-handed backhand)
- Coach: Jessie Marach
- Prize money: $4,706,185

Singles
- Career record: 20–33
- Career titles: 0
- Highest ranking: No. 82 (7 August 2006)

Grand Slam singles results
- Australian Open: 1R (2005, 2006)
- French Open: 1R (2002, 2006)
- Wimbledon: 1R (2006)
- US Open: 1R (2006)

Doubles
- Career record: 457–353
- Career titles: 23
- Highest ranking: No. 2 (28 May 2018)

Grand Slam doubles results
- Australian Open: W (2018)
- French Open: F (2018)
- Wimbledon: F (2017)
- US Open: QF (2010, 2019)

Other doubles tournaments
- Tour Finals: RR (2009, 2010, 2017, 2018)
- Olympic Games: QF (2016)

Mixed doubles
- Career record: 16–16
- Career titles: 0

Grand Slam mixed doubles results
- Australian Open: QF (2010)
- French Open: SF (2010)
- Wimbledon: SF (2016)
- US Open: SF (2017)

Team competitions
- Davis Cup: QF (2012)
- Last updated on: 27 February 2023.

Oliver Marach (born 16 July 1980) is a former Austrian professional tennis player who primarily specialised in doubles.

He achieved his highest singles ranking of world No. 82 in August 2005, but achieved most of his success in doubles where he reached his career-high doubles ranking of world No. 2 on 28 May 2018. Marach won his only Grand Slam title at the 2018 Australian Open, partnering Mate Pavić, and the pair also finished runners-up at the 2017 Wimbledon Championships and 2018 French Open. He and Pavić were the 2018 ATP Doubles Team of the year. In mixed doubles, he has reached three Grand Slam semifinals.

He has represented Austria in the Davis Cup since 2003, and also played at the 2016 Olympic Games alongside Alexander Peya. In 2021, in the 2020 Tokyo Olympics, he partnered with Philipp Oswald.

Marach retired from professional tennis in December 2022.

== Significant finals ==
=== Grand Slam tournament finals ===
==== Doubles: 3 (1 title, 2 runners-up) ====
Result	Year	Championship	Surface	Partner	Opponents	Score
Loss	2017	Wimbledon	Grass	(Croatia) Mate Pavić	(Poland) Łukasz Kubot (Brazil) Marcelo Melo	7–5, 5–7, 6–7^{(2–7)}, 6–3, 11–13
Win	2018	Australian Open	Hard	(Croatia) Mate Pavić	(Colombia) Juan Sebastián Cabal (Colombia) Robert Farah	6–4, 6–4
Loss	2018	French Open	Clay	(Croatia) Mate Pavić	(France) Pierre-Hugues Herbert (France) Nicolas Mahut	2–6, 6–7^{(4–7)}

=== Masters 1000 finals ===
==== Doubles: 1 (1 runner-up) ====
Result	Year	Tournament	Surface	Partner	Opponents	Score
Loss	2018	Monte-Carlo Masters	Clay	(Croatia) Mate Pavić	(United States) Bob Bryan (United States) Mike Bryan	6–7^{(5–7)}, 3–6

== ATP career finals ==
=== Doubles: 53 (23 titles, 30 runners-up) ===
Legend Grand Slam tournaments (1–2) ATP World Tour Finals (0–0) ATP World Tour Masters 1000 (0–1) ATP World Tour 500 Series (4–8) ATP World Tour 250 Series (18–19)	Finals by surface Hard (9–7) Clay (14–19) Grass (0–4) Carpet (0–0)

Result	W–L	Date	Tournament	Tier	Surface	Partner	Opponents	Score
Loss	0–1	May 2006	Pörtschach Open, Austria	International	Clay	(Czech Republic) Cyril Suk	(Australia) Paul Hanley (United States) Jim Thomas	3–6, 6–4, [5–10]
Loss	0–2	Jul 2006	Swedish Open, Sweden	International	Clay	(Germany) Christopher Kas	(Sweden) Jonas Björkman (Sweden) Thomas Johansson	3–6, 6–4, [4–10]
Loss	0–3	Jul 2006	Austrian Open Kitzbühel, Austria	Intl. Gold	Clay	(Czech Republic) Cyril Suk	(Germany) Philipp Kohlschreiber (Austria) Stefan Koubek	2–6, 3–6
Loss	0–4	Apr 2007	Grand Prix Hassan II, Morocco	International	Clay	(Poland) Łukasz Kubot	(Australia) Jordan Kerr (Czech Republic) David Škoch	6–7^{(4–7)}, 6–1, [4–10]
Win	1–4	Sep 2007	Romanian Open, Romania	International	Clay	(Slovakia) Michal Mertiňák	(Argentina) Martín García (Argentina) Sebastián Prieto	7–6^{(7–2)}, 7–6^{(10–8)}
Win	2–4	Mar 2008	Mexican Open, Mexico	Intl. Gold	Clay	(Slovakia) Michal Mertiňák	(Argentina) Agustín Calleri (Peru) Luis Horna	6–2, 6–7^{(3–7)}, [10–7]
Loss	2–5	Mar 2009	Mexican Open, Mexico	500 Series	Clay	(Poland) Łukasz Kubot	(Czech Republic) František Čermák (Slovakia) Michal Mertiňák	6–4, 4–6, [7–10]
Win	3–5	Apr 2009	Grand Prix Hassan II, Morocco	250 Series	Clay	(Poland) Łukasz Kubot	(Sweden) Simon Aspelin (Australia) Paul Hanley	7–6^{(7–4)}, 3–6, [10–6]
Win	4–5	May 2009	Serbia Open, Serbia	250 Series	Clay	(Poland) Łukasz Kubot	(Sweden) Johan Brunström (Netherlands Antilles) Jean-Julien Rojer	6–2, 7–6^{(7–3)}
Win	5–5	Nov 2009	Vienna Open, Austria	250 Series	Hard (i)	(Poland) Łukasz Kubot	(Austria) Julian Knowle (Austria) Jürgen Melzer	2–6, 6–4, [11–9]
Win	6–5	Feb 2010	Chile Open, Chile	250 Series	Clay	(Poland) Łukasz Kubot	(Italy) Potito Starace (Argentina) Horacio Zeballos	6–4, 6–0
Loss	6–6	Feb 2010	Brasil Open, Brazil	250 Series	Clay	(Poland) Łukasz Kubot	(Uruguay) Pablo Cuevas (Spain) Marcel Granollers	5–7, 4–6
Win	7–6	Feb 2010	Mexican Open, Mexico (2)	500 Series	Clay	(Poland) Łukasz Kubot	(Italy) Fabio Fognini (Italy) Potito Starace	6–0, 6–0
Win	8–6	May 2010	Bavarian Open, Germany	250 Series	Clay	(Spain) Santiago Ventura	(United States) Eric Butorac (Germany) Michael Kohlmann	5–7, 6–3, [16–14]
Loss	8–7	Feb 2011	Chile Open, Chile	250 Series	Clay	(Poland) Łukasz Kubot	(Brazil) Bruno Soares (Brazil) Marcelo Melo	3–6, 6–7^{(3–7)}
Win	9–7	Feb 2011	Argentina Open, Argentina	250 Series	Clay	(Argentina) Leonardo Mayer	(Brazil) Franco Ferreiro (Brazil) André Sá	7–6^{(8–6)}, 6–3
Loss	9–8	Apr 2011	Serbia Open, Serbia	250 Series	Clay	(Austria) Alexander Peya	(Czech Republic) František Čermák (Slovakia) Filip Polášek	5–7, 2–6
Win	10–8	Jul 2011	German Open, Germany	500 Series	Clay	(Austria) Alexander Peya	(Czech Republic) František Čermák (Slovakia) Filip Polášek	6–4, 6–1
Win	11–8	Oct 2011	Thailand Open, Thailand	250 Series	Hard (i)	(Pakistan) Aisam-ul-Haq Qureshi	(Germany) Michael Kohlmann (Germany) Alexander Waske	7–6^{(7–4)}, 7–6^{(7–5)}
Win	12–8	Jan 2012	Auckland Open, New Zealand	250 Series	Hard	(Austria) Alexander Peya	(Czech Republic) František Čermák (Slovakia) Filip Polášek	6–3, 6–2
Loss	12–9	May 2012	Open de Nice, France	250 Series	Clay	(Slovakia) Filip Polášek	(United States) Bob Bryan (United States) Mike Bryan	6–7^{(5–7)}, 3–6
Loss	12–10	Apr 2013	Romanian Open, Romania	250 Series	Clay	(Czech Republic) Lukáš Dlouhý	(Belarus) Max Mirnyi (Romania) Horia Tecău	6–4, 4–6, [6–10]
Loss	12–11	Oct 2013	Swiss Indoors, Switzerland	500 Series	Hard (i)	(Austria) Julian Knowle	(Philippines) Treat Huey (United Kingdom) Dominic Inglot	3–6, 6–3, [4–10]
Win	13–11	Feb 2014	Chile Open, Chile (2)	250 Series	Clay	(Romania) Florin Mergea	(Colombia) Juan Sebastián Cabal (Colombia) Robert Farah	6–3, 6–4
Loss	13–12	Jul 2014	Swedish Open, Sweden	250 Series	Clay	(France) Jérémy Chardy	(Sweden) Johan Brunström (United States) Nicholas Monroe	6–4, 6–7^{(5–7)}, [7–10]
Loss	13–13	Feb 2015	Rio Open, Brazil	500 Series	Clay	(Spain) Pablo Andújar	(Slovakia) Martin Kližan (Austria) Philipp Oswald	6–7^{(3–7)}, 4–6
Loss	13–14	Mar 2015	Argentina Open, Argentina	250 Series	Clay	(Spain) Pablo Andújar	(Finland) Jarkko Nieminen (Brazil) André Sá	6–4, 4–6, [7–10]
Loss	13–15	Aug 2015	Swiss Open, Switzerland	250 Series	Clay	(Pakistan) Aisam-ul-Haq Qureshi	(Belarus) Aliaksandr Bury (Uzbekistan) Denis Istomin	6–3, 2–6, [5–10]
Win	14–15	Jan 2016	Chennai Open, India	250 Series	Hard	(France) Fabrice Martin	(United States) Austin Krajicek (France) Benoît Paire	6–3, 7–5
Win	15–15	Feb 2016	Delray Beach Open, United States	250 Series	Hard	(France) Fabrice Martin	(United States) Bob Bryan (United States) Mike Bryan	3–6, 7–6^{(9–7)}, [13–11]
Loss	15–16	Jun 2016	Stuttgart Open, Germany	250 Series	Grass	(France) Fabrice Martin	(Australia) Marcus Daniell (Australia) Artem Sitak	7–6^{(7–4)}, 4–6, [8–10]
Loss	15–17	Oct 2016	Shenzhen Open, China	250 Series	Hard	(France) Fabrice Martin	(Italy) Fabio Fognini (Sweden) Robert Lindstedt	6–7^{(4–7)}, 3–6
Loss	15–18	Oct 2016	Vienna Open, Austria	500 Series	Hard (i)	(France) Fabrice Martin	(Poland) Łukasz Kubot (Brazil) Marcelo Melo	6–4, 3–6, [11–13]
Loss	15–19	Jun 2017	Stuttgart Open, Germany	250 Series	Grass	(Croatia) Mate Pavić	(United Kingdom) Jamie Murray (Brazil) Bruno Soares	7–6^{(7–4)}, 5–7, [5–10]
Loss	15–20	Jun 2017	Antalya Open, Turkey	250 Series	Grass	(Croatia) Mate Pavić	(Sweden) Robert Lindstedt (Pakistan) Aisam-ul-Haq Qureshi	5–7, 1–4 ret.
Loss	15–21	Jul 2017	Wimbledon, United Kingdom	Grand Slam	Grass	(Croatia) Mate Pavić	(Poland) Łukasz Kubot (Brazil) Marcelo Melo	7–5, 5–7, 6–7^{(2–7)}, 6–3, 11–13
Win	16–21	Jul 2017	Swiss Open, Switzerland	250 Series	Clay	(Austria) Philipp Oswald	(France) Jonathan Eysseric (Croatia) Franko Škugor	6–3, 4–6, [10–8]
Win	17–21	Oct 2017	Stockholm Open, Sweden	250 Series	Hard (i)	(Croatia) Mate Pavić	(Pakistan) Aisam-ul-Haq Qureshi (Netherlands) Jean-Julien Rojer	3–6, 7–6^{(8–6)}, [10–4]
Win	18–21	Jan 2018	Qatar Open, Qatar	250 Series	Hard	(Croatia) Mate Pavić	(United Kingdom) Jamie Murray (Brazil) Bruno Soares	6–2, 7–6^{(8–6)}
Win	19–21	Jan 2018	Auckland Open, New Zealand (2)	250 Series	Hard	(Croatia) Mate Pavić	(Belarus) Max Mirnyi (Austria) Philipp Oswald	6–4, 5–7, [10–7]
Win	20–21	Jan 2018	Australian Open, Australia	Grand Slam	Hard	(Croatia) Mate Pavić	(Colombia) Juan Sebastián Cabal (Colombia) Robert Farah	6–4, 6–4
Loss	20–22	Feb 2018	Rotterdam Open, Netherlands	500 Series	Hard (i)	(Croatia) Mate Pavić	(France) Pierre-Hugues Herbert (France) Nicolas Mahut	6–2, 2–6, [7–10]
Loss	20–23	Apr 2018	Monte-Carlo Masters, Monaco	Masters 1000	Clay	(Croatia) Mate Pavić	(United States) Bob Bryan (United States) Mike Bryan	6–7^{(5–7)}, 3–6
Win	21–23	May 2018	Geneva Open, Switzerland	250 Series	Clay	(Croatia) Mate Pavić	(Croatia) Ivan Dodig (United States) Rajeev Ram	3–6, 7–6^{(7–3)}, [11–9]
Loss	21–24	Jun 2018	French Open, France	Grand Slam	Clay	(Croatia) Mate Pavić	(France) Pierre-Hugues Herbert (France) Nicolas Mahut	2–6, 6–7^{(4–7)}
Loss	21–25	Jul 2018	German Open, Germany	500 Series	Clay	(Croatia) Mate Pavić	(Chile) Julio Peralta (Argentina) Horacio Zeballos	1–6, 6–4, [6–10]
Loss	21–26	Oct 2018	China Open, China	500 Series	Hard	(Croatia) Mate Pavić	(Poland) Łukasz Kubot (Brazil) Marcelo Melo	1–6, 4–6
Win	22–26	May 2019	Geneva Open, Switzerland	250 Series	Clay	(Croatia) Mate Pavić	(Australia) Matthew Ebden (Sweden) Robert Lindstedt	6–4, 6–4
Loss	22–27	Jul 2019	Croatia Open, Croatia	250 Series	Clay	(Austria) Jürgen Melzer	(Netherlands) Robin Haase (Austria) Philipp Oswald	5–7, 7–6^{(7–2)}, [12–14]
Win	23–27	Jul 2019	German Open, Germany (2)	500 Series	Clay	(Austria) Jürgen Melzer	(Netherlands) Robin Haase (Netherlands) Wesley Koolhof	6–2, 7–6^{(7–3)}
Loss	23–28	Feb 2020	Dubai Tennis Championships, United Arab Emirates	500 Series	Hard	(South Africa) Raven Klaasen	(Australia) John Peers (New Zealand) Michael Venus	3–6, 2–6
Loss	23–29	May 2021	Emilia-Romagna Open, Italy	250 Series	Clay	(Pakistan) Aisam-ul-Haq Qureshi	(Italy) Simone Bolelli (Argentina) Máximo González	3–6, 3–6
Loss	23–30	Oct 2021	Sofia Open, Bulgaria	250 Series	Hard (i)	(Austria) Philipp Oswald	(United Kingdom) Jonny O'Mara (United Kingdom) Ken Skupski	3–6, 4–6

== Performance timelines ==
Key
W	F	SF	QF	#R	RR	Q#	P#	DNQ	A	Z#	PO	G	S	B	NMS	NTI	P	NH

(W) winner; (F) finalist; (SF) semifinalist; (QF) quarterfinalist; (#R) rounds 4, 3, 2, 1; (RR) round-robin stage; (Q#) qualification round; (P#) preliminary round; (DNQ) did not qualify; (A) absent; (Z#) Davis/Fed Cup Zonal Group (with number indication) or (PO) play-off; (G) gold, (S) silver or (B) bronze Olympic/Paralympic medal; (NMS) not a Masters tournament; (NTI) not a Tier I tournament; (P) postponed; (NH) not held; (SR) strike rate (events won / competed); (W–L) win–loss record.
To avoid confusion and double counting, these charts are updated at the conclusion of a tournament or when the player's participation has ended.

=== Singles ===
Tournament	2002	2005	2006	2007	2008	SR	W–L
Grand Slam tournaments
Australian Open	A	1R	1R	Q1	Q1	0 / 2	0–2
French Open	1R	Q1	1R	Q2	A	0 / 2	0–2
Wimbledon	A	Q1	1R	A	A	0 / 1	0–1
US Open	A	A	1R	A	A	0 / 1	0–1
Win–loss	0–1	0–1	0–4	0–0	0–0	0 / 6	0–6

=== Doubles ===
Current through the 2021 Davis Cup Finals.

Tournament	1998	1999	2000	2001	2002	2003	2004	2005	2006	2007	2008	2009	2010	2011	2012	2013	2014	2015	2016	2017	2018	2019	2020	2021	SR	W–L
Grand Slam tournaments
Australian Open	A	A	A	A	A	A	A	A	1R	3R	1R	SF	3R	QF	1R	1R	2R	3R	2R	A	W	2R	2R	1R	1 / 15	23–14
French Open	A	A	A	A	A	A	A	A	2R	3R	A	2R	QF	1R	QF	3R	2R	2R	2R	2R	F	3R	1R	2R	0 / 15	24–15
Wimbledon	A	A	A	A	Q1	A	A	A	2R	A	1R	QF	1R	A	2R	A	1R	1R	3R	F	1R	2R	NH	3R	0 / 12	15–12
US Open	A	A	A	A	A	A	A	A	1R	A	A	1R	QF	A	A	2R	1R	1R	2R	3R	1R	QF	1R	1R	0 / 12	9–12
Win–loss	0–0	0–0	0–0	0–0	0–0	0–0	0–0	0–0	2–4	4–2	0–2	8–4	8–4	3–2	4–3	3–3	2–4	3–4	5–4	8–3	11–3	6–4	1–3	3–4	1 / 54	71–53
Year-end championship
ATP Finals	Did not qualify											RR	RR	Did not qualify						RR	RR	Did not qualify			0 / 4	5–5
ATP World Tour Masters 1000
Indian Wells Masters	A	A	A	A	A	A	A	A	A	A	A	2R	A	2R	2R	A	A	A	A	A	SF	SF	NH	A	0 / 6	10–5
Miami Open	A	A	A	A	A	A	A	A	A	A	A	A	1R	SF	2R	QF	2R	A	1R	1R	QF	QF	NH	QF	0 / 10	12–10
Monte-Carlo Masters	A	A	A	A	A	A	A	A	A	A	A	2R	QF	QF	QF	A	1R	A	1R	A	F	2R	NH	1R	0 / 9	8–9
Madrid Open	Not Held				A	A	A	A	A	A	A	A	QF	2R	1R	1R	A	A	A	2R	A	QF	NH	1R	0 / 7	4–7
Italian Open	A	A	A	A	A	A	A	A	A	A	A	A	SF	QF	A	A	A	A	QF	2R	QF	SF	1R	1R	0 / 8	10–8
Canada Open	A	A	A	A	A	A	A	A	A	A	A	QF	2R	A	A	A	A	A	A	SF	SF	1R	NH	2R	0 / 6	5–6
Cincinnati Masters	A	A	A	A	A	A	A	A	A	A	A	SF	SF	1R	A	A	A	A	A	2R	2R	1R	2R	A	0 / 7	5–7
Shanghai Masters	Not Held											QF	SF	2R	A	A	A	A	1R	QF	SF	1R	NH		0 / 7	6–7
Paris Masters	A	A	A	A	A	A	A	A	A	A	A	1R	QF	QF	A	A	A	A	A	A	SF	A	QF	A	0 / 5	6–4
Win–loss	0–0	0–0	0–0	0–0	0–0	0–0	0–0	0–0	0–0	0–0	0–0	5–6	9–8	8–8	4–4	2–2	1–2	0–0	2–4	5–6	13–7	11–8	3–3	3–5	0 / 65	66–63
National representation
Olympics	Not Held		A	Not Held			A	Not Held			A	Not Held			A	Not Held			QF	Not Held				2R	0 / 2	3–2
Davis Cup	A	A	A	A	A	Z1	A	A	PO	A	A	A	A	1R	QF	PO	A	Z1	A	A	PO	QR	RR		0 / 4	7–6
Career statistics
	1998	1999	2000	2001	2002	2003	2004	2005	2006	2007	2008	2009	2010	2011	2012	2013	2014	2015	2016	2017	2018	2019	2020	2021	Career	
Titles	0	0	0	0	0	0	0	0	0	1	1	3	3	3	1	0	1	0	2	2	4	2	0	0	23	
Finals	0	0	0	0	0	0	0	0	3	2	1	4	4	5	2	2	2	3	5	5	9	3	1	2	53	
Overall W–L	0–0	0–0	1–1	1–1	0–3	0–0	0–0	0–1	21–17	14–10	8–10	46–27	38–26	39–25	16–16	21–24	16–26	22–26	42–26	38–22	55–21	40–27	17–15	22–29	457–353	
Year-end ranking	793	828	264	233	169	463	213	153	40	48	69	13	11	17	48	38	67	48	33	19	4	32	29	45	56.42%	

Awards
Preceded by (Poland) Łukasz Kubot & (Brazil) Marcelo Melo	ATP Doubles Team of the Year (with (Croatia) Mate Pavić); 2018	Succeeded by (Colombia) Juan Sebastián Cabal & (Colombia) Robert Farah
