= 2012 Rogers Cup =

- Date: August 4–13
- Edition: 123rd (men) / 111th (women)
- Category: ATP World Tour Masters 1000 (men); WTA Premier 5 (women)
- Surface: Hard
- Location: Toronto, Canada (men); Montreal, Canada (women)

Champions

Men's singles
- (Serbia) Novak Djokovic

Women's singles
- (Czech Republic) Petra Kvitová

Men's doubles
- (United States) Bob Bryan / (United States) Mike Bryan

Women's doubles
- (Poland) Klaudia Jans-Ignacik / (France) Kristina Mladenovic
- Canadian Open

The 2012 Rogers Cup was a tennis tournament played on outdoor hard courts. It was the 123rd edition (for the men) and the 111th (for the women) of the Canadian Open, and was part of the ATP World Tour Masters 1000 of the 2012 ATP World Tour, and of the WTA Premier 5 tournaments of the 2012 WTA Tour. The women's and legends' events were held at the Uniprix Stadium in Montreal, from August 4 to August 13 and the men's event at the Rexall Centre in Toronto, from August 4 to August 12.

== Points and prize money ==
=== Point distribution ===
Stage	Men's singles	Men's doubles	Women's singles	Women's doubles
Champion	1000		900	
Runner up	600		620	
Semifinals	360		395	
Quarterfinals	180		225	
Round of 16	90		125	
Round of 32	45	0	70	1
Round of 64	10	–	1	–
Qualifier	25	–	30	–
Qualifying Finalist	14	–	20	–
Qualifying 2nd round	-	–	12	–
Qualifying 1st round	-	–	1	–

=== Prize money ===
All money is in U$:

Stage	Men's singles	Men's doubles	Women's singles	Women's doubles
Champion	$522,550	$155,490	$385,000	$110,000
Runner up	$256,220	$76,120	$193,000	$55,000
Semifinals	$128,960	$38,180	$96,500	$27,525
Quarterfinals	$65,575	$19,600	$47,000	$13,850
Round of 16	$34,050	$10,130	$22,750	$7,000
Round of 32	$17,950	$5,350	$11,500	$3,500
Round of 64	$9,695	–	$5,950	–
Final round qualifying	$2,145	–	$2,750	–
Second round qualifying	-	–	$1,450	–
First round qualifying	$1,095	–	$900	–

== ATP singles main-draw entrants ==
=== Seeds ===
The following players were seeded in the main singles draw, following the ATP rankings of July 30, 2012:

Country	Player	Ranking	Seeds
SRB	Novak Djokovic	2	1
GBR	Andy Murray	4	2
FRA	Jo-Wilfried Tsonga	6	3
CZE	Tomáš Berdych	7	4
SRB	Janko Tipsarević	8	5
ARG	Juan Martín del Potro	9	6
ARG	Juan Mónaco	10	7
USA	John Isner	11	8
FRA	Gilles Simon	13	9
CRO	Marin Čilić	14	10
USA	Mardy Fish	15	11
GER	Philipp Kohlschreiber	16	12
JPN	Kei Nishikori	17	13
FRA	Richard Gasquet	20	14
GER	Florian Mayer	22	15
CAN	Milos Raonic	23	16

=== Other entrants ===
The following players received wild cards into the main singles draw:

- (Canada) Frank Dancevic
- (Canada) Peter Polansky
- (Canada) Vasek Pospisil

The following player received entry as a special exempt:

- (United States) Sam Querrey

The following players received entry from the singles qualifying draw:

- (Germany) Michael Berrer
- (Italy) Flavio Cipolla
- (Italy) Fabio Fognini
- (United States) Wayne Odesnik
- (Ukraine) Sergiy Stakhovsky
- (Estonia) Jürgen Zopp

The following player received entry as a lucky loser:

- (Australia) Matthew Ebden

=== Withdrawals ===
- (Spain) Nicolás Almagro
- (Switzerland) Roger Federer
- (Spain) David Ferrer
- (Spain) Juan Carlos Ferrero
- (Netherlands) Robin Haase
- (Spain) Feliciano López
- (France) Gaël Monfils
- (Spain) Rafael Nadal
- (United States) Andy Roddick
- (Spain) Fernando Verdasco
- (Switzerland) Stanislas Wawrinka

=== Walkovers ===
- (United Kingdom) Andy Murray (knee injury)

== ATP doubles main-draw entrants ==
=== Seeds ===
Country	Player	Country	Player	Rank^{1}	Seed
BLR	Max Mirnyi	CAN	Daniel Nestor	2	1
USA	Bob Bryan	USA	Mike Bryan	6	2
POL	Mariusz Fyrstenberg	POL	Marcin Matkowski	16	3
SWE	Robert Lindstedt	ROU	Horia Tecău	21	4
AUT	Jürgen Melzer	IND	Leander Paes	23	5
IND	Mahesh Bhupathi	IND	Rohan Bopanna	29	6
PAK	Aisam-ul-Haq Qureshi	NED	Jean-Julien Rojer	33	7
ESP	Marcel Granollers	ESP	Marc López	34	8

- Rankings are as of July 30, 2012

=== Other entrants ===
The following pairs received wildcards into the doubles main draw:

- (Canada) Philip Bester / (Canada) Adil Shamasdin
- (Canada) Frank Dancevic / (Canada) Vasek Pospisil

The following pair received entry as alternates:

- (United States) Mardy Fish / (The Bahamas) Mark Knowles

=== Withdrawals ===
- (Czech Republic) Radek Štěpánek

=== Retirements ===
- (Serbia) Victor Troicki (back injury)

== WTA singles main-draw entrants ==
=== Seeds ===
The following players were seeded in the main singles draw, following the WTA rankings of July 30, 2012:

Country	Player	Ranking	Seeds
BLR	Victoria Azarenka	1	1
POL	Agnieszka Radwańska	2	2
RUS	Maria Sharapova	3	3
AUS	Samantha Stosur	5	4
CZE	Petra Kvitová	6	5
GER	Angelique Kerber	7	6
DEN	Caroline Wozniacki	8	7
ITA	Sara Errani	9	8
FRA	Marion Bartoli	10	9
CHN	Li Na	11	10
SRB	Ana Ivanovic	12	11
SVK	Dominika Cibulková	14	12
SRB	Jelena Janković	18	13
ITA	Flavia Pennetta	19	14
GER	Sabine Lisicki	20	15
CZE	Lucie Šafářová	22	16

=== Other entrants ===
The following players received wild cards into the main singles draw:

- (Canada) Eugenie Bouchard
- (Canada) Stéphanie Dubois
- (Canada) Aleksandra Wozniak

The following players received entry from the singles qualifying draw:

- (Hungary) Tímea Babos
- (Netherlands) Kiki Bertens
- (Slovakia) Jana Čepelová
- (Kazakhstan) Sesil Karatantcheva
- (Portugal) Michelle Larcher de Brito
- (France) Aravane Rezaï
- (Netherlands) Arantxa Rus
- (Georgia (country)) Anna Tatishvili

The following players received entry as a lucky loser:

- (Poland) Urszula Radwańska
- (Kazakhstan) Galina Voskoboeva

=== Withdrawals ===
- (Czech Republic) Petra Cetkovská (right ankle sprain)
- (Estonia) Kaia Kanepi (bilateral Achilles tendon injury)
- (Russia) Maria Kirilenko (right leg injury)
- (Russia) Svetlana Kuznetsova (right ankle injury)
- (Romania) Monica Niculescu (left hand injury)
- (Germany) Andrea Petkovic (right ankle injury)
- (Russia) Maria Sharapova (stomach virus)
- (China) Zheng Jie (low back injury)
- (Russia) Vera Zvonareva (illness)

=== Retirements ===
- (Belarus) Victoria Azarenka (right ankle sprain)
- (Romania) Simona Halep (left thigh injury)
- (Italy) Flavia Pennetta (right wrist injury)

== WTA doubles main-draw entrants ==
=== Seeds ===
Country	Player	Country	Player	Rank^{1}	Seed
USA	Liezel Huber	USA	Lisa Raymond	2	1
ITA	Sara Errani	ITA	Roberta Vinci	7	2
RUS	Nadia Petrova	SLO	Katarina Srebotnik	20	3
ARG	Gisela Dulko	ITA	Flavia Pennetta	29	4
ESP	Nuria Llagostera Vives	ESP	María José Martínez Sánchez	37	5
USA	Raquel Kops-Jones	USA	Abigail Spears	39	6
GER	Julia Görges	CZE	Květa Peschke	46	7
CZE	Iveta Benešová	CZE	Barbora Záhlavová-Strýcová	47	8

- ^{1} Rankings are as of July 30, 2012

=== Other entrants ===
The following pairs received wildcards into the doubles main draw:

- (Canada) Eugenie Bouchard / (Canada) Aleksandra Wozniak
- (Canada) Sharon Fichman / (Canada) Marie-Ève Pelletier

The following pair received entry as alternates:

- (United States) Jill Craybas / (Spain) Carla Suárez Navarro

=== Withdrawals ===
- (Italy) Flavia Pennetta (right wrist injury)

=== Retirements ===
- (Germany) Sabine Lisicki (left abdominal sprain)

== Finals ==
=== Men's singles ===
(Serbia) Novak Djokovic defeated (France) Richard Gasquet, 6–3, 6–2

- It was Djokovic 12th Masters 1000 title (2nd of the year), and his 31st title of his career (3rd of the year).

=== Women's singles ===
(Czech Republic) Petra Kvitová defeated (China) Li Na, 7–5, 2–6, 6–3

=== Men's doubles ===
(United States) Bob Bryan / (United States) Mike Bryan defeated (Spain) Marcel Granollers / (Spain) Marc López, 6–1, 4–6, [12–10]

- It was the Bryan twins 18th Masters 1000 title (2nd of the year), and 80th title of their careers together (6th of the year).

=== Women's doubles ===
(Poland) Klaudia Jans-Ignacik / (France) Kristina Mladenovic defeated (Russia) Nadia Petrova / (Slovenia) Katarina Srebotnik, 7–5, 2–6, [10–7]
