= 2011 BNP Paribas Open – Men's doubles =

Men's doubles
- 2011 BNP Paribas Open

Final
- Champion: (Ukraine) Alexandr Dolgopolov (Belgium) Xavier Malisse
- Runner-up: (Switzerland) Roger Federer (Switzerland) Stanislas Wawrinka
- Score: 6–4, 6–7^{(5–7)}, [10–7]

Events
Singles	men	women
Doubles	men	women
← 2010 ·	BNP Paribas Open	· 2012 →

Alexandr Dolgopolov and Xavier Malisse defeated Roger Federer and Stanislas Wawrinka in the final, 6–4, 6–7^{(5–7)}, [10–7] to win the men's doubles tennis title at the 2011 Indian Wells Masters.

Marc López and Rafael Nadal were the defending champions, but lost in the semifinals to Federer and Wawrinka.

== Seeds ==
1. (United States) Bob Bryan / (United States) Mike Bryan (second round)
2. (Belarus) Max Mirnyi / (Canada) Daniel Nestor (first round)
3. (India) Mahesh Bhupathi / (India) Leander Paes (second round)
4. (Poland) Mariusz Fyrstenberg / (Poland) Marcin Matkowski (first round)
5. (Austria) Jürgen Melzer / (Germany) Philipp Petzschner (second round)
6. (France) Michaël Llodra / (Serbia) Nenad Zimonjić (first round)
7. (Poland) Łukasz Kubot / (Austria) Oliver Marach (second round)
8. (Sweden) Robert Lindstedt / (Romania) Horia Tecău (first round)

== Draw ==
=== Key ===
- Q = Qualifier
- WC = Wild card
- LL = Lucky loser
- Alt = Alternate
- SE = Special exempt
- PR = Protected ranking
- ITF = ITF entry
- JE = Junior exempt
- w/o = Walkover
- r = Retired
- d = Defaulted
- SR = Special ranking

=== Finals ===
Semifinals
(Ukraine) Alexandr Dolgopolov (Belgium) Xavier Malisse	3	6	[10]
(India) Rohan Bopanna (Pakistan) Aisam-ul-Haq Qureshi	6	3	[8]
(Spain) Marc López (Spain) Rafael Nadal	5	3
(Switzerland) Roger Federer (Switzerland) Stanislas Wawrinka	7	6

Final
(Ukraine) Alexandr Dolgopolov (Belgium) Xavier Malisse	6	6^{5}	[10]
(Switzerland) Roger Federer (Switzerland) Stanislas Wawrinka	4	7^{7}	[7]

=== Top half ===
First round
1	(United States) B Bryan (United States) M Bryan	6	7
Alt	(Spain) F López (Canada) M Raonic	4	5
(Czech Republic) T Berdych (Serbia) J Tipsarević	6	4	[8]
(Ukraine) A Dolgopolov (Belgium) X Malisse	4	6	[10]
(Brazil) M Melo (Brazil) B Soares	5	6	[6]
(United Kingdom) A Murray (United Kingdom) J Murray	7	3	[10]
(United States) J Isner (United States) S Querrey	3	6	[10]
6	(France) M Llodra (Serbia) N Zimonjić	6	3	[8]
3	(India) M Bhupathi (India) L Paes	7	6
(Sweden) S Aspelin (Austria) J Knowle	5	4
(India) R Bopanna (Pakistan) A-u-H Qureshi	7^{7}	6
(United States) E Butorac (Curaçao) J-J Rojer	6^{4}	4
(Serbia) N Djokovic (Serbia) V Troicki	6	7
(Argentina) JI Chela (Argentina) J Mónaco	3	5
(Spain) G García-López (Spain) A Montañés	4	2
7	(Poland) Ł Kubot (Austria) O Marach	6	6

Second round
1	(United States) B Bryan (United States) M Bryan	5	7^{11}	[7]
(Ukraine) A Dolgopolov (Belgium) X Malisse	7	6^{9}	[10]
(United Kingdom) A Murray (United Kingdom) J Murray	6	3	[10]
(United States) J Isner (United States) S Querrey	3	6	[3]
3	(India) M Bhupathi (India) L Paes	3	4
(India) R Bopanna (Pakistan) A-u-H Qureshi	6	6
(Serbia) N Djokovic (Serbia) V Troicki	6	4	[10]
7	(Poland) Ł Kubot (Austria) O Marach	2	6	[7]

Quarterfinals
(Ukraine) A Dolgopolov (Belgium) X Malisse	6^{7}	6	[10]
(United Kingdom) A Murray (United Kingdom) J Murray	7^{9}	3	[8]
(India) R Bopanna (Pakistan) A-u-H Qureshi	6	7^{7}
(Serbia) N Djokovic (Serbia) V Troicki	1	6^{5}

Semifinals
(Ukraine) A Dolgopolov (Belgium) X Malisse	3	6	[10]
(India) R Bopanna (Pakistan) A-u-H Qureshi	6	3	[8]

=== Bottom half ===
First round
5	(Austria) J Melzer (Germany) P Petzschner	3	6	[12]
(Spain) N Almagro (Spain) D Ferrer	6	1	[10]
(Spain) M Granollers (Spain) T Robredo	3	4
(Czech Republic) L Dlouhý (Australia) P Hanley	6	6
WC	(Brazil) T Bellucci (United States) R Harrison	4	6	[8]
(Croatia) M Čilić (Croatia) I Karlović	6	3	[10]
(Spain) M López (Spain) R Nadal	7^{7}	7^{7}
4	(Poland) M Fyrstenberg (Poland) M Matkowski	6^{5}	6^{2}
8	(Sweden) R Lindstedt (Romania) H Tecău	6	6^{3}	[10]
(The Bahamas) M Knowles (Slovakia) M Mertiňák	2	7^{7}	[12]
(Spain) D Marrero (Spain) F Verdasco	7^{7}	4	[10]
WC	(Israel) J Erlich (Israel) A Ram	6^{2}	6	[12]
(France) J Benneteau (France) R Gasquet	6	7^{7}
(South Africa) K Anderson (Germany) P Kohlschreiber	4	6^{4}
(Switzerland) R Federer (Switzerland) S Wawrinka	6	6
2	(Belarus) M Mirnyi (Canada) D Nestor	1	2

Second round
5	(Austria) J Melzer (Germany) P Petzschner	7^{7}	6^{6}	[10]
(Czech Republic) L Dlouhý (Australia) P Hanley	6^{1}	7^{8}	[12]
(Croatia) M Čilić (Croatia) I Karlović	4	4
(Spain) M López (Spain) R Nadal	6	6
(The Bahamas) M Knowles (Slovakia) M Mertiňák	6	6
WC	(Israel) J Erlich (Israel) A Ram	3	4
(France) J Benneteau (France) R Gasquet	3	6	[10]
(Switzerland) R Federer (Switzerland) S Wawrinka	6	4	[12]

Quarterfinals
(Czech Republic) L Dlouhý (Australia) P Hanley	5	7^{7}	[7]
(Spain) M López (Spain) R Nadal	7	6^{3}	[10]
(The Bahamas) M Knowles (Slovakia) M Mertiňák	1	5
(Switzerland) R Federer (Switzerland) S Wawrinka	6	7

Semifinals
(Spain) M López (Spain) R Nadal	5	3
(Switzerland) R Federer (Switzerland) S Wawrinka	7	6
