= 2010 BNP Paribas Open – Men's doubles =

Men's doubles
- 2010 BNP Paribas Open

Final
- Champions: (Spain) Marc López (Spain) Rafael Nadal
- Runners-up: (Canada) Daniel Nestor (Serbia) Nenad Zimonjić
- Score: 7–6^{(10–8)}, 6–3

Events
Singles	men	women
Doubles	men	women
← 2009 ·	BNP Paribas Open	· 2011 →

Mardy Fish and Andy Roddick were the defending champions, but they chose not to play together.
Fish partnered up with Mario Ančić, but they lost to Feliciano López and Fernando Verdasco in the first round.
Roddick partnered up with James Blake, but they lost to Daniel Nestor and Nenad Zimonjić in the second round.

Marc López and Rafael Nadal defeated 7–6^{(10–8)}, 6–3 first-seeded pair Nestor and Zimonjić in the final.

== Seeds ==
1. (Canada) Daniel Nestor / (Serbia) Nenad Zimonjić (finals)
2. (United States) Bob Bryan / (United States) Mike Bryan (first round)
3. (Czech Republic) Lukáš Dlouhý / (India) Leander Paes (first round)
4. (India) Mahesh Bhupathi / (Belarus) Max Mirnyi (first round)
5. (Czech Republic) František Čermák / (Slovakia) Michal Mertiňák (quarterfinals, withdrew)
6. (Sweden) Simon Aspelin / (Australia) Paul Hanley (semifinals)
7. (Poland) Mariusz Fyrstenberg / (Poland) Marcin Matkowski (first round)
8. (Germany) Christopher Kas / (Belgium) Dick Norman (first round)

== Draw ==
=== Key ===
- Q = Qualifier
- WC = Wild card
- LL = Lucky loser
- Alt = Alternate
- SE = Special exempt
- PR = Protected ranking
- ITF = ITF entry
- JE = Junior exempt
- w/o = Walkover
- r = Retired
- d = Defaulted
- SR = Special ranking

=== Finals ===
Semifinals
1	(Canada) Daniel Nestor (Serbia) Nenad Zimonjić	6	6
(United States) John Isner (United States) Sam Querrey	4	2
WC	(Spain) Marc López (Spain) Rafael Nadal	6	6
6	(Sweden) Simon Aspelin (Australia) Paul Hanley	4	4

Final
1	(Canada) Daniel Nestor (Serbia) Nenad Zimonjić	6^{8}	3
WC	(Spain) Marc López (Spain) Rafael Nadal	7^{10}	6

=== Top half ===
First round
1	(Canada) D Nestor (Serbia) N Zimonjić	6	6
(United States) E Butorac (United States) R Ram	3	4
(United Kingdom) R Hutchins (United Kingdom) A Murray	5	6^{5}
(United States) J Blake (United States) A Roddick	7	7^{7}
(Brazil) T Bellucci (Uruguay) P Cuevas	6	4	[10]
(Brazil) M Melo (Brazil) B Soares	2	6	[4]
(Germany) B Becker (Australia) S Huss	5	7^{7}	[8]
5	(Czech Republic) F Čermák (Slovakia) M Mertiňák	7	6^{5}	[10]
4	(India) M Bhupathi (Belarus) M Mirnyi	4	4
ALT	(Russia) I Andreev (Kazakhstan) E Korolev	6	6
(United States) J Isner (United States) S Querrey	4	6	[12]
(Croatia) M Čilić (Croatia) I Ljubičić	6	1	[10]
(France) G Monfils (France) G Simon	4	2
(Spain) D Ferrer (Spain) A Montañés	6	6
(Croatia) I Karlović (Serbia) D Vemić	7^{8}	7^{7}
7	(Poland) M Fyrstenberg (Poland) M Matkowski	6^{6}	6^{3}

Second round
1	(Canada) D Nestor (Serbia) N Zimonjić	6	3	[10]
(United States) J Blake (United States) A Roddick	4	6	[7]
(Brazil) T Bellucci (Uruguay) P Cuevas	w/o
5	(Czech Republic) F Čermák (Slovakia) M Mertiňák
ALT	(Russia) I Andreev (Kazakhstan) E Korolev	5	7^{7}	[4]
(United States) J Isner (United States) S Querrey	7	6^{5}	[10]
(Spain) D Ferrer (Spain) A Montañés	3	6	[10]
(Croatia) I Karlović (Serbia) D Vemić	6	4	[12]

Quarterfinals
1	(Canada) D Nestor (Serbia) N Zimonjić
5	(Czech Republic) F Čermák (Slovakia) M Mertiňák	w/o
(United States) J Isner (United States) S Querrey	6	6
(Croatia) I Karlović (Serbia) D Vemić	3	4

Semifinals
1	(Canada) D Nestor (Serbia) N Zimonjić	6	6
(United States) J Isner (United States) S Querrey	4	2

=== Bottom half ===
First round
8	(Germany) C Kas (Belgium) D Norman	6^{5}	6	[8]
(Serbia) J Tipsarević (Serbia) V Troicki	7^{7}	2	[10]
(Czech Republic) M Damm (Czech Republic) R Štěpánek	7	3	[7]
(France) M Llodra (Israel) A Ram	5	6	[10]
(Spain) F López (Spain) F Verdasco	7^{11}	6
WC	(Croatia) M Ančić (United States) M Fish	6^{9}	3
WC	(Spain) M López (Spain) R Nadal	6	3	[10]
3	(Czech Republic) L Dlouhý (India) L Paes	4	6	[6]
6	(Sweden) S Aspelin (Australia) P Hanley	7	6
(Australia) J Kerr (Slovakia) F Polášek	5	3
(France) J Benneteau (France) J-W Tsonga	7	7
(Sweden) R Lindstedt (Sweden) R Söderling	5	5
(Sweden) J Brunström (Netherlands Antilles) J-J Rojer	6	4	[10]
(Austria) J Knowle (Austria) J Melzer	4	6	[5]
(Czech Republic) T Berdych (Germany) P Kohlschreiber	7^{7}	7
2	(United States) B Bryan (United States) M Bryan	6^{4}	5

Second round
(Serbia) J Tipsarević (Serbia) V Troicki	w/o
(France) M Llodra (Israel) A Ram
(Spain) F López (Spain) F Verdasco	4	6^{4}
WC	(Spain) M López (Spain) R Nadal	6	7^{7}
6	(Sweden) S Aspelin (Australia) P Hanley	7^{7}	6
(France) J Benneteau (France) J-W Tsonga	6^{4}	3
(Sweden) J Brunström (Netherlands Antilles) J-J Rojer	6	4	[10]
(Czech Republic) T Berdych (Germany) P Kohlschreiber	3	6	[4]

Quarterfinals
(France) M Llodra (Israel) A Ram	2	4
WC	(Spain) M López (Spain) R Nadal	6	6
6	(Sweden) S Aspelin (Australia) P Hanley	6	6
(Sweden) J Brunström (Netherlands Antilles) J-J Rojer	3	3

Semifinals
WC	(Spain) M López (Spain) R Nadal	6	6
6	(Sweden) S Aspelin (Australia) P Hanley	4	4
