= 2012 BNP Paribas Open – Men's doubles =

Men's doubles
- 2012 BNP Paribas Open

Final
- Champion: (Spain) Marc López (Spain) Rafael Nadal
- Runner-up: (United States) John Isner (United States) Sam Querrey
- Score: 6–2, 7–6^{(7–3)}

Events
Singles	men	women
Doubles	men	women
← 2011 ·	BNP Paribas Open	· 2013 →

2012 BNP Paribas Open – Men's doubles was a professional tennis tournament played at Indian Wells, California.

Alexandr Dolgopolov and Xavier Malisse were the defending champions, but lost in the second round to Marc López and Rafael Nadal, who went on to win the title against John Isner and Sam Querrey 6–2, 7–6^{(7–3)} in the final. López and Nadal did not lose a single set in the entire tournament.

== Seeds ==
1. (United States) Bob Bryan / (United States) Mike Bryan (quarterfinals, withdrew because of a stomach flu contracted by Mike Bryan)
2. (Belarus) Max Mirnyi / (Canada) Daniel Nestor (semifinals)
3. (France) Michaël Llodra / (Serbia) Nenad Zimonjić (first round)
4. (Sweden) Robert Lindstedt / (Romania) Horia Tecău (second round)
5. (India) Mahesh Bhupathi / (India) Rohan Bopanna (first round)
6. (Poland) Mariusz Fyrstenberg / (Poland) Marcin Matkowski (semifinals)
7. (India) Leander Paes / (Czech Republic) Radek Štěpánek (quarterfinals)
8. (Austria) Oliver Marach / (Austria) Alexander Peya (second round)

== Draw ==
Key

- Q = Qualifier
- WC = Wild card
- LL = Lucky loser
- Alt = Alternate
- ITF = ITF entry
- PR = Protected ranking
- SR = Special ranking
- SE = Special exempt
- JE = Junior exempt
- JR = Junior Accelerator Programme entrant
- CO = College Accelerator Programme entrant
- NG = Next Gen Accelerator Program entrant
- w/o = Walkover
- r = Retired
- d = Defaulted

=== Finals ===
Semifinals
6	(Poland) Mariusz Fyrstenberg (Poland) Marcin Matkowski	2	0
(Spain) Marc López (Spain) Rafael Nadal	6	6
(United States) John Isner (United States) Sam Querrey	6	6
2	(Belarus) Max Mirnyi (Canada) Daniel Nestor	4	2

Final
(Spain) Marc López (Spain) Rafael Nadal	6	7^{7}
(United States) John Isner (United States) Sam Querrey	2	6^{3}

=== Top half ===
First round
1	(United States) B Bryan (United States) M Bryan	6	7^{7}
(South Africa) K Anderson (Canada) M Raonic	3	6^{3}
(Serbia) N Djokovic (Serbia) V Troicki	5	5
(Spain) M Granollers (Spain) F López	7	7
(Colombia) JS Cabal (United States) S Lipsky	6	6^{5}	[4]
WC	(Australia) M Ebden (United States) R Harrison	4	7^{7}	[10]
(Germany) P Kohlschreiber (France) G Monfils	7	6^{4}	[8]
6	(Poland) M Fyrstenberg (Poland) M Matkowski	5	7^{7}	[10]
3	(France) M Llodra (Serbia) N Zimonjić	4	4
(Spain) M López (Spain) R Nadal	6	6
(Ukraine) A Dolgopolov (Belgium) X Malisse	6	6
(France) N Mahut (France) G Simon	4	4
(United States) E Butorac (Brazil) B Soares	7	4	[4]
(Argentina) J Mónaco (Japan) K Nishikori	5	6	[10]
(Spain) D Ferrer (Spain) A Ramos	3	3
7	(India) L Paes (Czech Republic) R Štěpánek	6	6

Second round
1	(United States) B Bryan (United States) M Bryan	6^{2}	7^{7}	[17]
(Spain) M Granollers (Spain) F López	7^{7}	6^{4}	[15]
WC	(Australia) M Ebden (United States) R Harrison	4	7^{7}	[4]
6	(Poland) M Fyrstenberg (Poland) M Matkowski	6	6^{5}	[10]
(Spain) M López (Spain) R Nadal	6	6
(Ukraine) A Dolgopolov (Belgium) X Malisse	4	3
(Argentina) J Mónaco (Japan) K Nishikori	6^{5}	4
7	(India) L Paes (Czech Republic) R Štěpánek	7^{7}	6

Quarterfinals
1	(United States) B Bryan (United States) M Bryan
6	(Poland) M Fyrstenberg (Poland) M Matkowski	w/o
(Spain) M López (Spain) R Nadal	6	7^{7}
7	(India) L Paes (Czech Republic) R Štěpánek	3	6^{5}

Semifinals
6	(Poland) M Fyrstenberg (Poland) M Matkowski	2	0
(Spain) M López (Spain) R Nadal	6	6

=== Bottom half ===
First round
8	(Austria) O Marach (Austria) A Peya	6	1	[10]
(Pakistan) A-u-H Qureshi (Netherlands) J-J Rojer	4	6	[6]
(Mexico) S González (Germany) C Kas	6	1	[4]
(France) R Gasquet (Australia) P Hanley	4	6	[10]
Alt	(Argentina) C Berlocq (Argentina) J I Chela	4	7	[4]
(United States) J Isner (United States) S Querrey	6	5	[10]
(Czech Republic) T Berdych (Poland) Ł Kubot	3	5
4	(Sweden) R Lindstedt (Romania) H Tecău	6	7
5	(India) M Bhupathi (India) R Bopanna	4	3
(France) J Benneteau (France) J-W Tsonga	6	6
(Germany) F Mayer (Finland) J Nieminen	6	1	[10]
(United States) M Fish (United States) A Roddick	4	6	[8]
(United Kingdom) C Fleming (United Kingdom) R Hutchins	6	2	[11]
(United Kingdom) A Murray (United Kingdom) J Murray	3	6	[13]
WC	(Spain) N Almagro (The Bahamas) M Knowles	3	6^{3}
2	(Belarus) M Mirnyi (Canada) D Nestor	6	7^{7}

Second round
8	(Austria) O Marach (Austria) A Peya	3	7^{9}	[9]
(France) R Gasquet (Australia) P Hanley	6	6^{7}	[11]
(United States) J Isner (United States) S Querrey	6	5	[10]
4	(Sweden) R Lindstedt (Romania) H Tecău	3	7	[5]
(France) J Benneteau (France) J-W Tsonga	5	6	[10]
(Germany) F Mayer (Finland) J Nieminen	7	1	[6]
(United Kingdom) A Murray (United Kingdom) J Murray	7^{7}	6^{5}	[5]
2	(Belarus) M Mirnyi (Canada) D Nestor	6^{5}	7^{7}	[10]

Quarterfinals
(France) R Gasquet (Australia) P Hanley	7^{7}	1	[6]
(United States) J Isner (United States) S Querrey	6^{5}	6	[10]
(France) J Benneteau (France) J-W Tsonga	6^{7}	3
2	(Belarus) M Mirnyi (Canada) D Nestor	7^{9}	6

Semifinals
(United States) J Isner (United States) S Querrey	6	6
2	(Belarus) M Mirnyi (Canada) D Nestor	4	2
