= 2013 Western & Southern Open – Men's doubles =

Men's doubles
- 2013 Western & Southern Open

Final
- Champions: (United States) Bob Bryan (United States) Mike Bryan
- Runners-up: (Spain) Marcel Granollers (Spain) Marc López
- Score: 6–4, 4–6, [10–4]

Events
Singles	men	women
Doubles	men	women
← 2012 ·	Western & Southern Open	· 2014 →

Robert Lindstedt and Horia Tecău were the defending champions, but decided not to participate together. Lindstedt played alongside Daniel Nestor, while Tecǎu teams up with Max Mirnyi. Each team lose in the second round.

== Seeds ==
1. (United States) Bob Bryan / (United States) Mike Bryan (champion)
2. (Spain) Marcel Granollers / (Spain) Marc López (final)
3. (Austria) Alexander Peya / (Brazil) Bruno Soares (quarterfinals)
4. (India) Leander Paes / (Czech Republic) Radek Štěpánek (quarterfinals)
5. (Pakistan) Aisam-ul-Haq Qureshi / (Netherlands) Jean-Julien Rojer (second round)
6. (Sweden) Robert Lindstedt / (Canada) Daniel Nestor (second round)
7. (France) Julien Benneteau / (Serbia) Nenad Zimonjić (second round)
8. (India) Rohan Bopanna / (France) Édouard Roger-Vasselin (semifinals)

== Draw ==
=== Key ===
- Q = Qualifier
- WC = Wild card
- LL = Lucky loser
- Alt = Alternate
- SE = Special exempt
- PR = Protected ranking
- ITF = ITF entry
- JE = Junior exempt
- w/o = Walkover
- r = Retired
- d = Defaulted
- SR = Special ranking

=== Finals ===
Semifinals
1	(United States) Bob Bryan (United States) Mike Bryan	4	7^{8}	[10]
(Mexico) Santiago González (United States) Scott Lipsky	6	6^{6}	[6]
8	(India) Rohan Bopanna (France) Édouard Roger-Vasselin	5	2
2	(Spain) Marcel Granollers (Spain) Marc López	7	6

Final
1	(United States) Bob Bryan (United States) Mike Bryan	6	4	[10]
2	(Spain) Marcel Granollers (Spain) Marc López	4	6	[4]

=== Top half ===
First round
(France) J Chardy (France) R Gasquet	6	6
WC	(United States) B Baker (United States) R Ram	4	4
WC	(United States) J Blake (United States) S Johnson	6	7
(Croatia) I Dodig (Brazil) M Melo	2	5
(Belarus) M Mirnyi (Romania) H Tecău	7^{7}	6
(Spain) F López (Spain) T Robredo	6^{2}	4
(Italy) F Fognini (Argentina) J Mónaco	4	3
(Mexico) S González (United States) S Lipsky	6	6

Second round
1	(United States) B Bryan (United States) M Bryan	w/o
(France) J Chardy (France) R Gasquet
WC	(United States) J Blake (United States) S Johnson	6	6
7	(France) J Benneteau (Serbia) N Zimonjić	1	4
3	(Austria) A Peya (Brazil) B Soares	6	7^{8}
(Belarus) M Mirnyi (Romania) H Tecău	4	6^{6}
(Mexico) S González (United States) S Lipsky	7^{7}	6
6	(Sweden) R Lindstedt (Canada) D Nestor	6^{3}	4

Quarterfinals
1	(United States) B Bryan (United States) M Bryan	6	6
WC	(United States) J Blake (United States) S Johnson	2	4
3	(Austria) A Peya (Brazil) B Soares	2	6	[14]
(Mexico) S González (United States) S Lipsky	6	4	[16]

Semifinals
1	(United States) B Bryan (United States) M Bryan	4	7^{8}	[10]
(Mexico) S González (United States) S Lipsky	6	6^{6}	[6]

=== Bottom half ===
First round
(Italy) A Seppi (Russia) M Youzhny	6	6
(France) B Paire (Switzerland) S Wawrinka	2	4
(Germany) P Kohlschreiber (Serbia) J Tipsarević	1	4
(Poland) J Janowicz (Poland) Ł Kubot	6	6
(France) M Llodra (France) N Mahut	6^{5}	4
(Poland) M Fyrstenberg (Poland) M Matkowski	7^{7}	6
PR	(United States) M Fish (Austria) J Melzer	6	4	[14]
(Finland) J Nieminen (France) G Simon	3	6	[12]

Second round
8	(India) R Bopanna (France) É Roger-Vasselin	7	6
(Italy) A Seppi (Russia) M Youzhny	5	3
(Poland) J Janowicz (Poland) Ł Kubot	3	4
4	(India) L Paes (Czech Republic) R Štěpánek	6	6
5	(Pakistan) A-u-H Qureshi (Netherlands) J-J Rojer	3	6^{3}
(Poland) M Fyrstenberg (Poland) M Matkowski	6	7^{7}
PR	(United States) M Fish (Austria) J Melzer	5	4
2	(Spain) M Granollers (Spain) M López	7	6

Quarterfinals
8	(India) R Bopanna (France) É Roger-Vasselin	6	6^{3}	[10]
4	(India) L Paes (Czech Republic) R Štěpánek	3	7^{7}	[8]
(Poland) M Fyrstenberg (Poland) M Matkowski	4	2
2	(Spain) M Granollers (Spain) M López	6	6

Semifinals
8	(India) R Bopanna (France) É Roger-Vasselin	5	2
2	(Spain) M Granollers (Spain) M López	7	6
