= 2012 BNP Paribas Open – Men's singles =

Tennis tournament

Men's singles
- 2012 BNP Paribas Open

Final
- Champion: (Switzerland) Roger Federer
- Runner-up: (United States) John Isner
- Score: 7–6^{(9–7)}, 6–3

Details
- Draw: 96
- Seeds: 32

Events
Singles	men	women
Doubles	men	women
- Indian Wells Masters

Roger Federer defeated John Isner in the final, 7–6^{(9–7)}, 6–3 to win the men's singles tennis title at the 2012 Indian Wells Masters. It was his record fourth Indian Wells title.

Novak Djokovic was the defending champion, but lost to Isner in the semifinals.

== Seeds ==
All seeds received a bye into the second round.

1. (Serbia) Novak Djokovic (semifinals)
2. (Spain) Rafael Nadal (semifinals)
3. (Switzerland) Roger Federer (champion)
4. (United Kingdom) Andy Murray (second round)
5. (Spain) David Ferrer (third round)
6. (France) Jo-Wilfried Tsonga (fourth round)
7. (Czech Republic) Tomáš Berdych (fourth round)
8. (United States) Mardy Fish (third round)
9. (Argentina) Juan Martín del Potro (quarterfinals)
10. (Serbia) Janko Tipsarević (third round)
11. (United States) John Isner (final)
12. (Spain) Nicolás Almagro (quarterfinals)
13. (France) Gilles Simon (quarterfinals)
14. (France) ~~Gaël Monfils~~ (withdrew because of gastroenteritis)
15. (Spain) Feliciano López (second round)
16. (France) Richard Gasquet (second round)
17. (Japan) Kei Nishikori (second round)
18. (Germany) Florian Mayer (second round)
19. (Spain) Fernando Verdasco (third round)
20. (Austria) Jürgen Melzer (second round)
21. (Ukraine) Alexandr Dolgopolov (fourth round)
22. (Argentina) Juan Mónaco (third round)
23. (Switzerland) Stanislas Wawrinka (third round)
24. (Croatia) Marin Čilić (second round)
25. (Serbia) Viktor Troicki (second round)
26. (Spain) Marcel Granollers (third round)
27. (Canada) Milos Raonic (third round)
28. (Czech Republic) Radek Štěpánek (third round)
29. (South Africa) Kevin Anderson (third round)
30. (United States) Andy Roddick (third round)
31. (Argentina) Juan Ignacio Chela (second round)
32. (France) Julien Benneteau (second round)

== Draw ==
Key

- Q = Qualifier
- WC = Wild card
- LL = Lucky loser
- Alt = Alternate
- ITF = ITF entry
- PR = Protected ranking
- SR = Special ranking
- SE = Special exempt
- JE = Junior exempt
- JR = Junior Accelerator Programme entrant
- CO = College Accelerator Programme entrant
- NG = Next Gen Accelerator Program entrant
- w/o = Walkover
- r = Retired
- d = Defaulted

=== Finals ===
Quarterfinals
1	(Serbia) Novak Djokovic	6	6
12	(Spain) Nicolás Almagro	3	4
13	(France) Gilles Simon	3	6	5
11	(United States) John Isner	6	1	7
9	(Argentina) Juan Martín del Potro	3	2
3	(Switzerland) Roger Federer	6	6
(Argentina) David Nalbandian	6	5	4
2	(Spain) Rafael Nadal	4	7	6

Semifinals
1	(Serbia) Novak Djokovic	6^{7}	6	6^{5}
11	(United States) John Isner	7^{9}	3	7^{7}
3	(Switzerland) Roger Federer	6	6
2	(Spain) Rafael Nadal	3	4

Final
11	(United States) John Isner	6^{7}	3
3	(Switzerland) Roger Federer	7^{9}	6

=== Top half ===
==== Section 1 ====
First round
Q	(Kazakhstan) A Golubev	6	6
Q	(South Africa) R de Voest	1	4
(Germany) M Bachinger	4	2
(Germany) P Kohlschreiber	6	6
(Netherlands) R Haase	2	6	6^{2}
(Spain) P Andújar	6	3	7^{7}
(Spain) A Ramos	6^{10}	7^{7}	6
WC	(United States) J Levine	7^{12}	6^{4}	2

Second round
1	(Serbia) N Djokovic	6	6
Q	(Kazakhstan) A Golubev	3	2
(Germany) P Kohlschreiber
29	(South Africa) K Anderson	w/o
18	(Germany) F Mayer	2	4
(Spain) P Andújar	6	6
(Spain) A Ramos	3	7	6
16	(France) R Gasquet	6	5	1

Third round
1	(Serbia) N Djokovic	6	6
29	(South Africa) K Anderson	2	3
(Spain) P Andújar	7^{7}	6
(Spain) A Ramos	6^{5}	4

Fourth round
1	(Serbia) N Djokovic	6	6^{5}	6
(Spain) P Andújar	0	7^{7}	2

==== Section 2 ====
First round
Q	(United States) T Smyczek	6^{1}	4
WC	(United States) S Querrey	7^{7}	6
(Colombia) S Giraldo	5	6	6
WC	(United States) J Sock	7	0	1
(Croatia) I Karlović	4	2
(Poland) Ł Kubot	6	6
(Russia) A Bogomolov Jr.	6^{7}	6	6^{3}
(Ukraine) S Stakhovsky	7^{9}	4	7^{7}

Second round
12	(Spain) N Almagro	5	6	6
WC	(United States) S Querrey	7	4	4
(Colombia) S Giraldo	7	6
17	(Japan) K Nishikori	5	2
30	(United States) A Roddick	4	7^{7}	6
(Poland) Ł Kubot	6	6^{5}	3
(Ukraine) S Stakhovsky	7^{7}	3	4
7	(Czech Republic) T Berdych	6^{2}	6	6

Third round
12	(Spain) N Almagro	4	6	7^{7}
(Colombia) S Giraldo	6	2	6^{2}
30	(United States) A Roddick	3	6	2
7	(Czech Republic) T Berdych	6	4	6

Fourth round
12	(Spain) N Almagro	6	6
7	(Czech Republic) T Berdych	4	0

==== Section 3 ====
First round
(Spain) G García López	7^{8}	4	6
(Portugal) R Machado	6^{6}	6	2
(Italy) F Cipolla	1	2
(United States) R Harrison	6	6
Q	(Italy) P Lorenzi	6	3	4
WC	(United States) R Ginepri	1	6	6
Q	(Bosnia and Herzegovina) A Delić	6	0	2
(Israel) D Sela	2	6	6

Second round
4	(United Kingdom) A Murray	4	2
(Spain) G García López	6	6
(United States) R Harrison	7^{7}	6
25	(Serbia) V Troicki	6^{5}	3
23	(Switzerland) S Wawrinka	4	6	6
WC	(United States) R Ginepri	6	4	4
(Israel) D Sela	5	7^{8}	4
13	(France) G Simon	7	6^{6}	6

Third round
(Spain) G García López	4	5
(United States) R Harrison	6	7
23	(Switzerland) S Wawrinka	4	4
13	(France) G Simon	6	6

Fourth round
(United States) R Harrison	6^{0}	7	1
13	(France) G Simon	7^{7}	5	6

==== Section 4 ====
First round
LL	(Portugal) F Gil	6	6^{6}	6
Q	(United States) R Williams	3	7^{8}	4
Q	(Canada) V Pospisil	3	2
(France) N Mahut	6	6
Q	(Australia) M Ebden	6	4	6
(Russia) I Kunitsyn	1	6	4
(Italy) A Seppi	4	6	6
(Belgium) O Rochus	6	3	4

Second round
11	(United States) J Isner	7	6
LL	(Portugal) F Gil	5	3
(France) N Mahut	4	7	3
22	(Argentina) J Mónaco	6	5	6
32	(France) J Benneteau	6	3	2
Q	(Australia) M Ebden	2	6	6
(Italy) A Seppi	3	2^{r}
8	(United States) M Fish	6	3

Third round
11	(United States) J Isner	7	7
22	(Argentina) J Mónaco	5	5
Q	(Australia) M Ebden	6	6
8	(United States) M Fish	3	4

Fourth round
11	(United States) J Isner	6	7
Q	(Australia) M Ebden	4	5

=== Bottom half ===
==== Section 5 ====
First round
(Croatia) I Dodig	1	4
(Bulgaria) G Dimitrov	6	6
(Chinese Taipei) Y-h Lu	6^{6}	3
(Uzbekistan) D Istomin	7^{8}	6
(Germany) C-M Stebe	2	2
(United States) R Sweeting	6	6
Q	(Australia) M Matosevic	6	6
Q	(Belgium) R Bemelmans	2	3

Second round
5	(Spain) D Ferrer	6	6
(Bulgaria) G Dimitrov	2	2
(Uzbekistan) D Istomin	7^{7}	6^{7}	7
31	(Argentina) JI Chela	6^{5}	7^{9}	5
19	(Spain) F Verdasco	6	6
(United States) R Sweeting	2	2
Q	(Australia) M Matosevic	5	2
9	(Argentina) JM del Potro	7	6

Third round
5	(Spain) D Ferrer	4	3
(Uzbekistan) D Istomin	6	6
19	(Spain) F Verdasco	2	6^{6}
9	(Argentina) JM del Potro	6	7^{8}

Fourth round
(Uzbekistan) D Istomin	6^{2}	7^{8}	2
9	(Argentina) JM del Potro	7^{7}	6^{6}	6

==== Section 6 ====
First round
(Russia) N Davydenko	7	6
Q	(Ukraine) S Bubka	5	3
(Czech Republic) L Rosol	2	6^{4}
(Brazil) T Bellucci	6	7^{7}
(Argentina) C Berlocq	6	6
(France) B Paire	4	2
LL	(Germany) T Kamke	6	6^{3}	4
WC	(United States) D Kudla	2	7^{7}	6

Second round
LL	(Germany) B Phau	5	2
(Russia) N Davydenko	7	6
(Brazil) T Bellucci	6	6
20	(Austria) J Melzer	3	3
27	(Canada) M Raonic	6	6
(Argentina) C Berlocq	4	2
WC	(United States) D Kudla	4	1
3	(Switzerland) R Federer	6	6

Third round
(Russia) N Davydenko
(Brazil) T Bellucci	w/o
27	(Canada) M Raonic	7^{7}	2	4
3	(Switzerland) R Federer	6^{4}	6	6

Fourth round
(Brazil) T Bellucci	6	3	4
3	(Switzerland) R Federer	3	6	6

==== Section 7 ====
First round
(France) M Llodra	6	5	7^{7}
(Latvia) E Gulbis	3	7	6^{3}
(Belgium) X Malisse	6	6
Q	(United States) B Reynolds	2	4
(Italy) P Starace	6^{4}	0
(Argentina) D Nalbandian	7^{7}	6
(Australia) B Tomic	6	6^{4}	0
(Luxembourg) G Müller	4	7^{7}	6

Second round
6	(France) J-W Tsonga	4
(France) M Llodra	1^{r}
(Belgium) X Malisse	2	1
28	(Czech Republic) R Štěpánek	6	6
24	(Croatia) M Čilić	6^{3}	6^{4}
(Argentina) D Nalbandian	7^{7}	7^{7}
(Luxembourg) G Müller	4	2
10	(Serbia) J Tipsarević	6	6

Third round
6	(France) J-W Tsonga	6^{2}	6	6
28	(Czech Republic) R Štěpánek	7^{7}	3	2
(Argentina) D Nalbandian	6	3	6
10	(Serbia) J Tipsarević	3	6	3

Fourth round
6	(France) J-W Tsonga	6	5	3
(Argentina) D Nalbandian	3	7	6

==== Section 8 ====
First round
(France) J Chardy	3	4
(Cyprus) M Baghdatis	6	6
(United States) D Young	2	6	6^{5}
(Belgium) S Darcis	6	3	7^{7}
(Finland) J Nieminen	6^{9}	4
(Germany) T Haas	7^{11}	6
(Colombia) A Falla	6	6^{7}	4
(Argentina) L Mayer	2	7^{9}	6

Second round
15	(Spain) F López	3	4
(Cyprus) M Baghdatis	6	6
(Belgium) S Darcis	7^{15}	3	5
21	(Ukraine) A Dolgopolov	6^{13}	6	7
26	(Spain) M Granollers	6	2	6
(Germany) T Haas	3	6	3
(Argentina) L Mayer	1	3
2	(Spain) R Nadal	6	6

Third round
(Cyprus) M Baghdatis	4	7	4
21	(Ukraine) A Dolgopolov	6	5	6
26	(Spain) M Granollers	1	4
2	(Spain) R Nadal	6	6

Fourth round
21	(Ukraine) A Dolgopolov	3	2
2	(Spain) R Nadal	6	6

== Qualifying ==
=== Seeds ===
1. (Portugal) Frederico Gil (qualifying competition, lucky loser)
2. (Germany) Tobias Kamke (qualifying competition, lucky loser)
3. (Australia) Matthew Ebden (qualified)
4. (Italy) Paolo Lorenzi (qualified)
5. (Brazil) João Souza (first round)
6. (Russia) Igor Andreev (first round)
7. (Turkey) Marsel İlhan (first round)
8. (Germany) Björn Phau (qualifying competition, lucky loser)
9. (Canada) Vasek Pospisil (qualified)
10. (United States) Bobby Reynolds (qualified)
11. (South Africa) Rik de Voest (qualified)
12. (Brazil) Ricardo Mello (first round)
13. (Estonia) Jürgen Zopp (qualifying competition)
14. (Netherlands) Thomas Schoorel (qualifying competition)
15. (United States) Michael Russell (qualifying competition)
16. (Australia) Marinko Matosevic (qualified)
17. (South Africa) Izak van der Merwe (qualifying competition)
18. (Kazakhstan) Andrey Golubev (qualified)
19. (Brazil) Júlio Silva (first round)
20. (Spain) Arnau Brugués Davi (first round)
21. (United States) Rajeev Ram (qualifying competition)
22. (Switzerland) Marco Chiudinelli (first round)
23. (United Kingdom) James Ward (first round)
24. (Belgium) Ruben Bemelmans (qualified)

=== Qualifiers ===
1. (Belgium) Ruben Bemelmans
2. (Bosnia and Herzegovina) Amer Delić
3. (Australia) Matthew Ebden
4. (Italy) Paolo Lorenzi
5. (Ukraine) Sergei Bubka
6. (United States) Tim Smyczek
7. (United States) Rhyne Williams
8. (Kazakhstan) Andrey Golubev
9. (Canada) Vasek Pospisil
10. (United States) Bobby Reynolds
11. (South Africa) Rik de Voest
12. (Australia) Marinko Matosevic

=== Lucky losers ===
1. (Portugal) Frederico Gil
2. (Germany) Tobias Kamke
3. (Germany) Björn Phau

=== Draw ===
Key

- Q = Qualifier
- WC = Wild card
- LL = Lucky loser
- Alt = Alternate
- ITF = ITF entry
- PR = Protected ranking
- SR = Special ranking
- SE = Special exempt
- JE = Junior exempt
- JR = Junior Accelerator Programme entrant
- CO = College Accelerator Programme entrant
- NG = Next Gen Accelerator Program entrant
- w/o = Walkover
- r = Retired
- d = Defaulted

==== First qualifier ====
First round
1	(Portugal) Frederico Gil	6	6
(United States) Alex Kuznetsov	1	1
(Canada) Pierre-Ludovic Duclos	6^{5}	7	3
24	(Belgium) Ruben Bemelmans	7^{7}	5	6

Qualifying competition
1	(Portugal) Frederico Gil	4	6	4
24	(Belgium) Ruben Bemelmans	6	3	6

==== Second qualifier ====
First round
2	(Germany) Tobias Kamke	4	6	6
(Australia) Greg Jones	6	2	4
(Bosnia and Herzegovina) Amer Delić	6	7^{7}
19	(Brazil) Júlio Silva	2	6^{2}

Qualifying competition
2	(Germany) Tobias Kamke	3	6	4
(Bosnia and Herzegovina) Amer Delić	6	2	6

==== Third qualifier ====
First round
3	(Australia) Matthew Ebden	6	6
(Dominican Republic) Víctor Estrella	3	2
(Spain) Iván Navarro	4	2
21	(United States) Rajeev Ram	6	6

Qualifying competition
3	(Australia) Matthew Ebden	6	6
21	(United States) Rajeev Ram	4	3

==== Fourth qualifier ====
First round
4	(Italy) Paolo Lorenzi	6	6
(Germany) Dominik Meffert	2	4
WC	(United States) Daniel Kosakowski	7^{7}	6
22	(Switzerland) Marco Chiudinelli	6^{5}	3

Qualifying competition
4	(Italy) Paolo Lorenzi	6	7^{7}
WC	(United States) Daniel Kosakowski	2	6^{4}

==== Fifth qualifier ====
First round
5	(Brazil) João Souza	2	7	6^{5}
(Ukraine) Sergei Bubka	6	5	7^{7}
WC	(United States) Dennis Novikov	1	6^{7}
14	(Netherlands) Thomas Schoorel	6	7^{9}

Qualifying competition
(Ukraine) Sergei Bubka	6	3	6
14	(Netherlands) Thomas Schoorel	3	6	4

==== Sixth qualifier ====
First round
6	(Russia) Igor Andreev	1	6	3
WC	(United States) Tim Smyczek	6	1	6
WC	(Tunisia) Haithem Abid	2	2
15	(United States) Michael Russell	6	6

Qualifying competition
WC	(United States) Tim Smyczek	6	6
15	(United States) Michael Russell	2	0

==== Seventh qualifier ====
First round
7	(Turkey) Marsel İlhan	4	4
WC	(United States) Rhyne Williams	6	6
(Germany) Mischa Zverev	2	6	1
13	(Estonia) Jürgen Zopp	6	1	6

Qualifying competition
WC	(United States) Rhyne Williams	7^{7}	1	6
13	(Estonia) Jürgen Zopp	6^{1}	6	1

==== Eighth qualifier ====
First round
8	(Germany) Björn Phau	6	6
(Germany) Denis Gremelmayr	0	4
(Spain) Roberto Bautista Agut	6^{3}	4
18	(Kazakhstan) Andrey Golubev	7^{7}	6

Qualifying competition
8	(Germany) Björn Phau	4	4
18	(Kazakhstan) Andrey Golubev	6	6

==== Ninth qualifier ====
First round
9	(Canada) Vasek Pospisil	7	3	7
(France) Mathieu Rodrigues	5	6	5
(Belgium) Maxime Authom	6	6
23	(United Kingdom) James Ward	1	2

Qualifying competition
9	(Canada) Vasek Pospisil	4	6	6
(Belgium) Maxime Authom	6	4	3

==== Tenth qualifier ====
First round
10	(United States) Bobby Reynolds	6	6
(Germany) Peter Gojowczyk	4	1
(Canada) Frank Dancevic	6	6
20	(Spain) Arnau Brugués Davi	3	0

Qualifying competition
10	(United States) Bobby Reynolds	4	7^{7}	6
(Canada) Frank Dancevic	6	6^{2}	4

==== Eleventh qualifier ====
First round
11	(South Africa) Rik de Voest	6	5
(Italy) Stefano Galvani	3	1^{r}
(Switzerland) Stéphane Bohli	6^{2}	1
17	(South Africa) Izak van der Merwe	7^{7}	6

Qualifying competition
11	(South Africa) Rik de Voest	7	6
17	(South Africa) Izak van der Merwe	5	3

==== Twelfth qualifier ====
First round
12	(Brazil) Ricardo Mello	3	7^{7}	0
(United States) Michael Yani	6	6^{5}	6
(Portugal) Gastão Elias	2	5
16	(Australia) Marinko Matosevic	6	7

Qualifying competition
(United States) Michael Yani	2	2
16	(Australia) Marinko Matosevic	6	6
