= 2012 Rogers Cup – Men's doubles =

Men's doubles
- 2012 Rogers Cup

Final
- Champions: (United States) Bob Bryan (United States) Mike Bryan
- Runners-up: (Spain) Marcel Granollers (Spain) Marc López
- Score: 6–1, 4–6, [12–10]

Details
- Draw: 28
- Seeds: 8

Events
Singles	men	women
Doubles	men	women
- Rogers Cup

Michaël Llodra and Nenad Zimonjić were the defending champions, but Llodra chose not to compete this year.
Zimonjić played alongside Paul Hanley, but they lost to Bob and Mike Bryan in the quarterfinals, who won the tournament in the end against Marcel Granollers and Marc López 6–1, 4–6, [12–10].

== Seeds ==
All seeds receive a bye into the second round.

1. (Belarus) Max Mirnyi / (Canada) Daniel Nestor (quarterfinals)
2. (United States) Bob Bryan / (United States) Mike Bryan (champions)
3. (Poland) Mariusz Fyrstenberg / (Poland) Marcin Matkowski (quarterfinals)
4. (Sweden) Robert Lindstedt / (Romania) Horia Tecău (semifinals)
5. (Austria) Jürgen Melzer / (India) Leander Paes (semifinals)
6. (India) Mahesh Bhupathi / (India) Rohan Bopanna (second round)
7. (Pakistan) Aisam-ul-Haq Qureshi / (Netherlands) Jean-Julien Rojer (quarterfinals)
8. (Spain) Marcel Granollers / (Spain) Marc López (final)

== Draw ==
Key

- Q = Qualifier
- WC = Wild card
- LL = Lucky loser
- Alt = Alternate
- ITF = ITF entry
- PR = Protected ranking
- SR = Special ranking
- SE = Special exempt
- JE = Junior exempt
- JR = Junior Accelerator Programme entrant
- CO = College Accelerator Programme entrant
- NG = Next Gen Accelerator Program entrant
- w/o = Walkover
- r = Retired
- d = Defaulted

=== Finals ===
Semifinals
8	(Spain) Marcel Granollers (Spain) Marc López	7^{12}	7
4	(Sweden) Robert Lindstedt (Romania) Horia Tecău	6^{10}	5
5	(Austria) Jürgen Melzer (India) Leander Paes	3	4
2	(United States) Bob Bryan (United States) Mike Bryan	6	6

Final
8	(Spain) Marcel Granollers (Spain) Marc López	1	6	[10]
2	(United States) Bob Bryan (United States) Mike Bryan	6	4	[12]

=== Top half ===
First round
(Italy) F Fognini (Argentina) J Mónaco	7^{7}	6
(United Kingdom) J Marray (United Kingdom) R Hutchins	6^{5}	3
(France) J Benneteau (France) R Gasquet	6^{2}	6	[7]
(Czech Republic) T Berdych (Germany) F Mayer	7^{7}	4	[10]
(Italy) D Bracciali (Italy) A Seppi	6	6
(South Africa) K Anderson (United States) E Butorac	3	4
WC	(Canada) P Bester (Canada) A Shamasdin	4	6	[11]
(France) J Chardy (France) G Simon	6	4	[13]

Second round
1	(Belarus) M Mirnyi (Canada) D Nestor	6	6
(Italy) F Fognini (Argentina) J Mónaco	4	3
(Czech Republic) T Berdych (Germany) F Mayer	2	2
8	(Spain) M Granollers (Spain) M López	6	6
4	(Sweden) R Lindstedt (Romania) H Tecău	6	6
(Italy) D Bracciali (Italy) A Seppi	1	4
(France) J Chardy (France) G Simon	7^{7}	4	[5]
7	(Pakistan) A-u-H Qureshi (Netherlands) J-J Rojer	6^{5}	6	[10]

Quarterfinals
1	(Belarus) M Mirnyi (Canada) D Nestor	4	4
8	(Spain) M Granollers (Spain) M López	6	6
4	(Sweden) R Lindstedt (Romania) H Tecău	6	3	[10]
7	(Pakistan) A-u-H Qureshi (Netherlands) J-J Rojer	4	6	[7]

Semifinals
8	(Spain) M Granollers (Spain) M López	7^{12}	7
4	(Sweden) R Lindstedt (Romania) H Tecău	6^{10}	5

=== Bottom half ===
First round
(Canada) M Raonic (Serbia) V Troicki	7	2	[10]
Alt	(United States) M Fish (The Bahamas) M Knowles	5	6	[8]
(Mexico) S González (United States) S Lipsky	6	6
(Germany) P Kohlschreiber (Russia) M Youzhny	0	0
(Argentina) C Berlocq (Japan) K Nishikori	3	5
(Australia) P Hanley (Serbia) N Zimonjić	6	7
WC	(Canada) F Dancevic (Canada) V Pospisil	2	6^{2}
(Croatia) I Dodig (Brazil) M Melo	6	7^{7}

Second round
5	(Austria) J Melzer (India) L Paes	w/o
(Canada) M Raonic (Serbia) V Troicki
(Mexico) S González (United States) S Lipsky	5	5
3	(Poland) M Fyrstenberg (Poland) M Matkowski	7	7
6	(India) M Bhupathi (India) R Bopanna	4	6^{6}
(Australia) P Hanley (Serbia) N Zimonjić	6	7^{8}
(Croatia) I Dodig (Brazil) M Melo	5	2
2	(United States) B Bryan (United States) M Bryan	7	6

Quarterfinals
5	(Austria) J Melzer (India) L Paes	7^{7}	4	[10]
3	(Poland) M Fyrstenberg (Poland) M Matkowski	6^{5}	6	[6]
(Australia) P Hanley (Serbia) N Zimonjić	5	1
2	(United States) B Bryan (United States) M Bryan	7	6

Semifinals
5	(Austria) J Melzer (India) L Paes	3	4
2	(United States) B Bryan (United States) M Bryan	6	6
