= 2012 Western & Southern Open – Men's doubles =

Men's doubles
- 2012 Western & Southern Open

Final
- Champions: (Sweden) Robert Lindstedt (Romania) Horia Tecău
- Runners-up: (India) Mahesh Bhupathi (India) Rohan Bopanna
- Score: 6–4, 6–4

Events
Singles	men	women
Doubles	men	women
← 2011 ·	Western & Southern Open	· 2013 →

Mahesh Bhupathi and Leander Paes were the defending champions. However, they chose not to play together. Bhupathi played with Rohan Bopanna and Paes played with Radek Štěpánek

== Seeds ==
All seeds received a bye into the second round.

1. (Belarus) Max Mirnyi / (Canada) Daniel Nestor (second round)
2. (United States) Bob Bryan / (United States) Mike Bryan (semifinals)
3. (Poland) Mariusz Fyrstenberg / (Poland) Marcin Matkowski (quarterfinals)
4. (Sweden) Robert Lindstedt / (Romania) Horia Tecău (champions)
5. (India) Leander Paes / (Czech Republic) Radek Štěpánek (second round)
6. (India) Mahesh Bhupathi / (India) Rohan Bopanna (final)
7. (Spain) Marcel Granollers / (Spain) Marc López (quarterfinals)
8. (Pakistan) Aisam-ul-Haq Qureshi / (Netherlands) Jean-Julien Rojer (quarterfinals)

== Draw ==
=== Key ===
- Q = Qualifier
- WC = Wild card
- LL = Lucky loser
- Alt = Alternate
- SE = Special exempt
- PR = Protected ranking
- ITF = ITF entry
- JE = Junior exempt
- w/o = Walkover
- r = Retired
- d = Defaulted
- SR = Special ranking

=== Finals ===
Semifinals
(Croatia) Ivan Dodig (Brazil) Marcelo Melo	4	3
6	(India) Mahesh Bhupathi (India) Rohan Bopanna	6	6
4	(Sweden) Robert Lindstedt (Romania) Horia Tecău	7	6^{5}	[10]
2	(United States) Bob Bryan (United States) Mike Bryan	5	7^{7}	[2]

Final
6	(India) Mahesh Bhupathi (India) Rohan Bopanna	4	4
4	(Sweden) Robert Lindstedt (Romania) Horia Tecău	6	6

=== Top half ===
First round
(Australia) P Hanley (Serbia) N Zimonjić	6^{5}	6	[7]
(Italy) A Seppi (Serbia) V Troicki	7^{7}	2	[10]
(Czech Republic) T Berdych (Germany) F Mayer	4	3
(Croatia) I Dodig (Brazil) M Melo	6	6
(United Kingdom) J Marray (Denmark) F Nielsen	4	6^{1}
(Poland) Ł Kubot (Serbia) J Tipsarević	6	7^{7}
(Netherlands) R Haase (Argentina) J Mónaco	6	3	[10]
(South Africa) K Anderson (United States) E Butorac	4	6	[6]

Second round
1	(Belarus) M Mirnyi (Canada) D Nestor	6	4	[8]
(Italy) A Seppi (Serbia) V Troicki	4	6	[10]
(Croatia) I Dodig (Brazil) M Melo	6	4	[10]
5	(India) L Paes (Czech Republic) R Štěpánek	3	6	[5]
3	(Poland) M Fyrstenberg (Poland) M Matkowski	w/o
(Poland) Ł Kubot (Serbia) J Tipsarević
(Netherlands) R Haase (Argentina) J Mónaco
6	(India) M Bhupathi (India) R Bopanna	w/o

Quarterfinals
(Italy) A Seppi (Serbia) V Troicki	0	1
(Croatia) I Dodig (Brazil) M Melo	6	6
3	(Poland) M Fyrstenberg (Poland) M Matkowski	4	6	[8]
6	(India) M Bhupathi (India) R Bopanna	6	3	[10]

Semifinals
(Croatia) I Dodig (Brazil) M Melo	4	3
6	(India) M Bhupathi (India) R Bopanna	6	6

=== Bottom half ===
First round
(United Kingdom) C Fleming (United Kingdom) R Hutchins	4	4
(Colombia) JS Cabal (Brazil) B Soares	6	6
WC	(United States) B Baker (United States) R Ram	6	6^{4}	[10]
(France) J Benneteau (France) R Gasquet	4	7^{7}	[2]
(Austria) J Melzer (Germany) P Petzschner	2	6^{5}
WC	(United States) J Blake (United States) S Querrey	6	7^{7}
(Finland) J Nieminen (Switzerland) S Wawrinka	7^{8}	2	[10]
(Germany) P Kohlschreiber (Russia) M Youzhny	6^{6}	6	[8]

Second round
7	(Spain) M Granollers (Spain) M López	2	7^{7}	[10]
(Colombia) JS Cabal (Brazil) B Soares	6	6^{3}	[7]
WC	(United States) B Baker (United States) R Ram	4	6	[6]
4	(Sweden) R Lindstedt (Romania) H Tecău	6	3	[10]
8	(Pakistan) A-u-H Qureshi (Netherlands) J-J Rojer	6	7^{7}
WC	(United States) J Blake (United States) S Querrey	2	6^{4}
(Finland) J Nieminen (Switzerland) S Wawrinka	0	1
2	(United States) B Bryan (United States) M Bryan	6	6

Quarterfinals
7	(Spain) M Granollers (Spain) M López	6^{3}	6^{2}
4	(Sweden) R Lindstedt (Romania) H Tecău	7^{7}	7^{7}
8	(Pakistan) A-u-H Qureshi (Netherlands) J-J Rojer	6	4	[4]
2	(United States) B Bryan (United States) M Bryan	4	6	[10]

Semifinals
4	(Sweden) R Lindstedt (Romania) H Tecău	7	6^{5}	[10]
2	(United States) B Bryan (United States) M Bryan	5	7^{7}	[2]
