= 2013 Western & Southern Open – Men's singles =

Men's singles
- 2013 Western & Southern Open

Final
- Champion: (Spain) Rafael Nadal
- Runner-up: (United States) John Isner
- Score: 7–6^{(10–8)}, 7–6^{(7–3)}

Events
Singles	men	women
Doubles	men	women
- Western & Southern Open

Rafael Nadal defeated John Isner in the final, 7–6^{(10–8)}, 7–6^{(7–3)} to win the men's singles tennis title at the 2013 Cincinnati Open. It was his record-extending 26th Masters title. Nadal was the second man (after Novak Djokovic) to win four consecutive Masters 1000 events.

Roger Federer was the defending champion, but lost in the quarterfinals to Nadal.

== Seeds ==
The top eight seeds receive a bye into the second round.

1. (Serbia) Novak Djokovic (quarterfinals)
2. (United Kingdom) Andy Murray (quarterfinals)
3. (Spain) David Ferrer (third round)
4. (Spain) Rafael Nadal (champion)
5. (Switzerland) Roger Federer (quarterfinals)
6. (Czech Republic) Tomáš Berdych (semifinals)
7. (Argentina) Juan Martín del Potro (semifinals)
8. (France) Richard Gasquet (second round)

9. (Switzerland) Stanislas Wawrinka (second round)
10. (Japan) Kei Nishikori (first round)
11. (Germany) Tommy Haas (third round)
12. (Canada) Milos Raonic (third round)
13. (Spain) Nicolás Almagro (first round)
14. (Italy) Fabio Fognini (first round)
15. (France) Gilles Simon (first round, retired)
16. (Poland) Jerzy Janowicz (first round)

Click on the seed number of a player to go to their draw section.

== Draw ==
Key

- Q = Qualifier
- WC = Wild card
- LL = Lucky loser
- Alt = Alternate
- ITF = ITF entry
- PR = Protected ranking
- SR = Special ranking
- SE = Special exempt
- JE = Junior exempt
- JR = Junior Accelerator Programme entrant
- CO = College Accelerator Programme entrant
- NG = Next Gen Accelerator Program entrant
- w/o = Walkover
- r = Retired
- d = Defaulted

=== Finals ===
Quarterfinals
1	(Serbia) Novak Djokovic	6^{5}	6	5
(United States) John Isner	7^{7}	3	7
Q	(Russia) Dmitry Tursunov	4	6	1
7	(Argentina) Juan Martín del Potro	6	3	6
5	(Switzerland) Roger Federer	7	4	3
4	(Spain) Rafael Nadal	5	6	6
6	(Czech Republic) Tomáš Berdych	6	6
2	(United Kingdom) Andy Murray	3	4

Semifinals
(United States) John Isner	6^{5}	7^{11}	6
7	(Argentina) Juan Martín del Potro	7^{7}	6^{9}	3
4	(Spain) Rafael Nadal	7	7^{7}
6	(Czech Republic) Tomáš Berdych	5	6^{4}

Final
(United States) John Isner	6^{8}	6^{3}
4	(Spain) Rafael Nadal	7^{10}	7^{7}

=== Top half ===
==== Section 1 ====
First round
(Argentina) J Mónaco	6	6
(Austria) J Melzer	3	2
Q	(Belgium) D Goffin	6	6
Q	(United States) M McDonald	1	1
SE	(Canada) V Pospisil	6	1
15	(France) G Simon	3	1^{r}
12	(Canada) M Raonic	3	6	6
WC	(United States) J Sock	6	4	3
(Serbia) J Tipsarević	6^{5}	6	6
(United States) S Querrey	7^{7}	3	4
(Germany) F Mayer	3	4
(United States) J Isner	6	6

Second round
1	(Serbia) N Djokovic	7	6
(Argentina) J Mónaco	5	2
Q	(Belgium) D Goffin	7	1	7^{8}
SE	(Canada) V Pospisil	5	6	6^{6}
12	(Canada) M Raonic	6	7^{7}
(Serbia) J Tipsarević	4	6^{4}
(United States) J Isner	7^{8}	6
8	(France) R Gasquet	6^{6}	2

Third round
1	(Serbia) N Djokovic	6	6
Q	(Belgium) D Goffin	2	0
12	(Canada) M Raonic	6^{5}	4
(United States) J Isner	7^{7}	6

Quarterfinals
1	(Serbia) N Djokovic	6^{5}	6	5
(United States) J Isner	7^{7}	3	7

==== Section 2 ====
First round
WC	(United States) R Harrison	7^{7}	6
(Ukraine) A Dolgopolov	6^{3}	4
Q	(Russia) D Tursunov	4	7^{8}	6
(Slovakia) M Kližan	6	6^{6}	4
WC	(United States) J Blake	6	7
16	(Poland) J Janowicz	1	5
10	(Japan) K Nishikori	4	6^{4}
(Spain) F López	6	7^{7}
(France) J Chardy	6	6
Q	(France) A Mannarino	4	3
(France) B Paire	6^{8}	3
(Russia) N Davydenko	7^{10}	6

Second round
3	(Spain) D Ferrer	7^{7}	3	6
WC	(United States) R Harrison	6^{5}	6	4
Q	(Russia) D Tursunov	6	6
WC	(United States) J Blake	4	4
(Spain) F López	6	2
(France) J Chardy	4	2^{r}
(Russia) N Davydenko	5	5
7	(Argentina) JM del Potro	7	7

Third round
3	(Spain) D Ferrer	2	4
Q	(Russia) D Tursunov	6	6
(Spain) F López	4	6	4
7	(Argentina) JM del Potro	6	1	6

Quarterfinals
Q	(Russia) D Tursunov	4	6	1
7	(Argentina) JM del Potro	6	3	6

=== Bottom half ===
==== Section 3 ====
First round
(Germany) P Kohlschreiber	7	6
PR	(United States) M Fish	5	2
(Spain) M Granollers	5	6	6
(Czech Republic) L Rosol	7	4	0
(South Africa) K Anderson	4	4
11	(Germany) T Haas	6	6
13	(Spain) N Almagro	6^{3}	4
(Bulgaria) G Dimitrov	7^{7}	6
WC	(United States) B Baker	7	6
(Uzbekistan) D Istomin	5	3
Q	(Spain) P Andújar	1	4
Q	(Germany) B Becker	6	6

Second round
5	(Switzerland) R Federer	6	7^{9}
(Germany) P Kohlschreiber	3	6^{7}
(Spain) M Granollers	4	1
11	(Germany) T Haas	6	6
(Bulgaria) G Dimitrov	6	6
WC	(United States) B Baker	3	2
Q	(Germany) B Becker	2	2
4	(Spain) R Nadal	6	6

Third round
5	(Switzerland) R Federer	1	7	6
11	(Germany) T Haas	6	5	3
(Bulgaria) G Dimitrov	2	7	2
4	(Spain) R Nadal	6	5	6

Quarterfinals
5	(Switzerland) R Federer	7	4	3
4	(Spain) R Nadal	5	6	6

==== Section 4 ====
First round
Q	(France) E Roger-Vasselin	3	4
(Finland) J Nieminen	6	6
(Spain) T Robredo	6^{6}	7^{9}	6
(Brazil) T Bellucci	7^{8}	6^{7}	2
(Italy) A Seppi	3	4
9	(Switzerland) S Wawrinka	6	6
14	(Italy) F Fognini	2	4
(Czech Republic) R Štěpánek	6	6
(France) J Benneteau	6	6
(Cyprus) M Baghdatis	3	2
(Latvia) E Gulbis	5	3
(Russia) M Youzhny	7	6

Second round
6	(Czech Republic) T Berdych	6	6
(Finland) J Nieminen	3	2
(Spain) T Robredo	7	3	6
9	(Switzerland) S Wawrinka	5	6	3
(Czech Republic) R Štěpánek	2	7	6^{4}
(France) J Benneteau	6	5	7^{7}
(Russia) M Youzhny	2	3
2	(United Kingdom) A Murray	6	6

Third round
6	(Czech Republic) T Berdych	6	6
(Spain) T Robredo	3	0
(France) J Benneteau	2	2
2	(United Kingdom) A Murray	6	6

Quarterfinals
6	(Czech Republic) T Berdych	6	6
2	(United Kingdom) A Murray	3	4

== Qualifying ==
=== Seeds ===
1. (Croatia) Ivan Dodig (first round, retired because of fatigue)
2. (Australia) Bernard Tomic (first round)
3. (Russia) Dmitry Tursunov (qualified)
4. (Spain) Pablo Andújar (qualified)
5. (Chinese Taipei) Lu Yen-hsun (first round)
6. (Slovenia) Grega Žemlja (qualifying competition)
7. (France) Adrian Mannarino (qualified)
8. (Poland) Łukasz Kubot (first round)
9. (France) Édouard Roger-Vasselin (qualified)
10. (Spain) Albert Ramos (first round)
11. (France) Nicolas Mahut (first round)
12. (Russia) Alex Bogomolov Jr. (first round)
13. (Belgium) David Goffin (qualified)
14. (Croatia) Ivo Karlović (qualifying competition)

=== Qualifiers ===
1. (Germany) Benjamin Becker
2. (Belgium) David Goffin
3. (Russia) Dmitry Tursunov
4. (Spain) Pablo Andújar
5. (United States) Mackenzie McDonald
6. (France) Édouard Roger-Vasselin
7. (France) Adrian Mannarino

=== Qualifying draw ===
==== First qualifier ====
First round
1	(Croatia) Ivan Dodig	3	1^{r}
(United States) Michael Russell	6	3
(Germany) Benjamin Becker	6	6
8	(Poland) Łukasz Kubot	2	3

Qualifying competition
(United States) Michael Russell	7^{7}	6^{4}	4
(Germany) Benjamin Becker	6^{5}	7^{7}	6

==== Second qualifier ====
First round
2/Alt	(Australia) Bernard Tomic	4	2
WC	(United States) Robby Ginepri	6	6
Alt	(Russia) Teymuraz Gabashvili	3	6^{4}
13	(Belgium) David Goffin	6	7^{7}

Qualifying competition
WC	(United States) Robby Ginepri	4	2
13	(Belgium) David Goffin	6	6

==== Third qualifier ====
First round
3	(Russia) Dmitry Tursunov	6^{3}	6	6
(Slovenia) Aljaž Bedene	7^{7}	3	3
(Portugal) João Sousa	6	6
12	(Russia) Alex Bogomolov Jr.	4	3

Qualifying competition
3	(Russia) Dmitry Tursunov	6	6
(Portugal) João Sousa	1	4

==== Fourth qualifier ====
First round
4	(Spain) Pablo Andújar	6	2	7
WC	(United States) Eric Quigley	3	6	5
WC	(United States) Tim Smyczek	1	7^{8}	6
10	(Spain) Albert Ramos	6	6^{6}	4

Qualifying competition
4	(Spain) Pablo Andújar	6	6
WC	(United States) Tim Smyczek	1	3

==== Fifth qualifier ====
First round
5	(Chinese Taipei) Lu Yen-hsun	6^{4}	4
(United States) Steve Johnson	7^{7}	6
WC	(United States) Mackenzie McDonald	3	7^{7}	6
11	(France) Nicolas Mahut	6	6^{5}	4

Qualifying competition
(United States) Steve Johnson	6	4	4
WC	(United States) Mackenzie McDonald	3	6	6

==== Sixth qualifier ====
First round
6	(Slovenia) Grega Žemlja	3	6	6
(United States) Denis Kudla	6	2	4
(Lithuania) Ričardas Berankis	1	0
9	(France) Édouard Roger-Vasselin	6	6

Qualifying competition
6	(Slovenia) Grega Žemlja	3	6^{7}
9	(France) Édouard Roger-Vasselin	6	7^{9}

==== Seventh qualifier ====
First round
7	(France) Adrian Mannarino	5	7^{8}	6
(United States) Rajeev Ram	7	6^{6}	3
(Germany) Tobias Kamke	6^{8}	4
14	(Croatia) Ivo Karlović	7^{10}	6

Qualifying competition
7	(France) Adrian Mannarino	6	6
14	(Croatia) Ivo Karlović	4	4
