= 2012 Rogers Cup – Women's singles =

Women's singles
- 2012 Rogers Cup

Final
- Champion: (Czech Republic) Petra Kvitová
- Runner-up: (China) Li Na
- Score: 7–5, 2–6, 6–3

Details
- Draw: 48
- Seeds: 16

Events
Singles	men	women
Doubles	men	women
- Rogers Cup

Petra Kvitová defeated Li Na in the final, 7–5, 2–6, 6–3 to win the women's singles tennis title at the 2012 Canadian Open.

Serena Williams was the reigning champion, but chose not to compete this year.

== Seeds ==
All seeds receive a bye into the second round.

1. (Belarus) Victoria Azarenka (second round, retired because of a left knee injury)
2. (Poland) Agnieszka Radwańska (quarterfinals)
3. (Russia) Maria Sharapova (withdrew because of a stomach virus)
4. (Australia) Samantha Stosur (third round)
5. (Czech Republic) Petra Kvitová (champion)
6. (Germany) Angelique Kerber (third round)
7. (Denmark) Caroline Wozniacki (semifinals)
8. (Italy) Sara Errani (third round)
9. (France) Marion Bartoli (third round)
10. (China) Li Na (final)
11. (Serbia) Ana Ivanovic (second round)
12. (Slovakia) Dominika Cibulková (second round)
13. (Serbia) Jelena Janković (second round)
14. (Italy) Flavia Pennetta (second round, retired because of a right wrist injury)
15. (Germany) Sabine Lisicki (second round)
16. (Czech Republic) Lucie Šafářová (semifinals)

== Draw ==
Key

- Q = Qualifier
- WC = Wild card
- LL = Lucky loser
- Alt = Alternate
- ITF = ITF entry
- PR = Protected ranking
- SR = Special ranking
- SE = Special exempt
- JE = Junior exempt
- JR = Junior Accelerator Programme entrant
- CO = College Accelerator Programme entrant
- NG = Next Gen Accelerator Program entrant
- w/o = Walkover
- r = Retired
- d = Defaulted

=== Finals ===
Quarterfinals
(Austria) Tamira Paszek	3	2
5	(Czech Republic) Petra Kvitová	6	6
WC	(Canada) Aleksandra Wozniak	4	4
7	(Denmark) Caroline Wozniacki	6	6
(Italy) Roberta Vinci	2	2
16	(Czech Republic) Lucie Šafářová	6	6
10	(China) Li Na	6	6
2	(Poland) Agnieszka Radwańska	2	1

Semifinals
5	(Czech Republic) Petra Kvitová	3	6	6
7	(Denmark) Caroline Wozniacki	6	2	3
16	(Czech Republic) Lucie Šafářová	6	3	5
10	(China) Li Na	3	6	7

Final
5	(Czech Republic) Petra Kvitová	7	2	6
10	(China) Li Na	5	6	3

=== Top half ===
==== Section 1 ====
First round
(Austria) T Paszek	6	6
(Germany) J Görges	2	1
(Spain) C Suárez Navarro	1	6	6
(Spain) MJ Martínez Sánchez	6	4	3
(China) S Peng	7^{7}	6
Q	(France) A Rezaï	6^{5}	3
Q	(Georgia (country)) A Tatishvili	6^{6}	6^{4}
(Kazakhstan) K Pervak	7^{8}	7^{7}

Second round
1	(Belarus) V Azarenka	3^{r}
(Austria) T Paszek	3
(Spain) C Suárez Navarro	3	6	6
15	(Germany) S Lisicki	6	3	4
9	(France) M Bartoli	6	6
(China) S Peng	1	3
(Kazakhstan) K Pervak	6	6^{0}	0
5	(Czech Republic) P Kvitová	4	7^{7}	6

Third round
(Austria) T Paszek	6	6
(Spain) C Suárez Navarro	3	0
9	(France) M Bartoli	1	1
5	(Czech Republic) P Kvitová	6	6

Quarterfinals
(Austria) T Paszek	3	2
5	(Czech Republic) P Kvitová	6	6

==== Section 2 ====
First round
Q	(Netherlands) A Rus	6	1	3
(United States) C McHale	3	6	6
WC	(Canada) A Wozniak	7	7^{7}
(Slovakia) D Hantuchová	5	6^{5}
(Russia) A Pavlyuchenkova	2	3
(United States) V Lepchenko	6	6
(Russia) N Petrova	6	6^{4}	4
Q	(Netherlands) K Bertens	3	7^{7}	6

Second round
LL	(Kazakhstan) G Voskoboeva	5	6	2
(United States) C McHale	7	3	6
WC	(Canada) A Wozniak	6	6
13	(Serbia) J Janković	2	3
12	(Slovakia) D Cibulková	4	4
(United States) V Lepchenko	6	6
Q	(Netherlands) K Bertens	5	1
7	(Denmark) C Wozniacki	7	6

Third round
(United States) C McHale	6^{5}	3
WC	(Canada) A Wozniak	7^{7}	6
(United States) V Lepchenko	6	3	4
7	(Denmark) C Wozniacki	4	6	6

Quarterfinals
WC	(Canada) A Wozniak	4	4
7	(Denmark) C Wozniacki	6	6

=== Bottom half ===
==== Section 3 ====
First round
(Russia) E Makarova	6	6
LL	(Poland) U Radwańska	4	2
(Italy) R Vinci	6	3	7
(Belgium) Y Wickmayer	2	6	5
(Romania) S Cîrstea	0	0
Q	(Kazakhstan) S Karatantcheva	6	6
(Romania) S Halep	6	6
Q	(Portugal) M Larcher de Brito	4	3

Second round
6	(Germany) A Kerber	6	6
(Russia) E Makarova	3	3
(Italy) R Vinci	6	6
11	(Serbia) A Ivanovic	0	0
16	(Czech Republic) L Safářová	6	6
Q	(Kazakhstan) S Karatantcheva	4	4
(Romania) S Halep	5	4^{r}
4	(Australia) S Stosur	7	4

Third round
6	(Germany) A Kerber	2	6^{7}
(Italy) R Vinci	6	7^{9}
16	(Czech Republic) L Safářová	7^{11}	7^{7}
4	(Australia) S Stosur	6^{9}	6^{5}

Quarterfinals
(Italy) R Vinci	2	2
16	(Czech Republic) L Safářová	6	6

==== Section 4 ====
First round
(Sweden) S Arvidsson	3	3
Q	(Slovakia) J Čepelová	6	6
WC	(Canada) E Bouchard	3	6	7
(Israel) S Pe'er	6	2	5
(South Africa) C Scheepers	1	6	6
WC	(Canada) S Dubois	6	3	0
(Germany) M Barthel	6	5	7^{7}
Q	(Hungary) T Babos	4	7	6^{5}

Second round
8	(Italy) S Errani	6	6
Q	(Slovakia) J Čepelová	3	2
WC	(Canada) E Bouchard	4	4
10	(China) N Li	6	6
14	(Italy) F Pennetta	4^{r}
(South Africa) C Scheepers	1
(Germany) M Barthel	6	3	6^{5}
2	(Poland) A Radwańska	4	6	7^{7}

Third round
8	(Italy) S Errani	4	2
10	(China) N Li	6	6
(South Africa) C Scheepers	2	4
2	(Poland) A Radwańska	6	6

Quarterfinals
10	(China) N Li	6	6
2	(Poland) A Radwańska	2	1

== Qualifying ==
=== Seeds ===
1. (Poland) Urszula Radwańska (qualifying competition, lucky loser)
2. (United States) Vania King (withdrew because of a change of schedule)
3. (Kazakhstan) Galina Voskoboeva (qualifying competition, lucky loser)
4. (Czech Republic) Barbora Záhlavová-Strýcová (second round)
5. (Czech Republic) Iveta Benešová (qualifying competition)
6. (Netherlands) Arantxa Rus (qualified)
7. (Hungary) Tímea Babos (qualified)
8. (Serbia) Bojana Jovanovski (first round)
9. (Luxembourg) Mandy Minella (first round)
10. (Netherlands) Kiki Bertens (qualified)
11. (Georgia (country)) Anna Tatishvili (qualified)
12. (Sweden) Johanna Larsson (qualifying competition)
13. (United States) Julia Cohen (first round)
14. (Russia) Vera Dushevina (qualifying competition)
15. (Croatia) Mirjana Lučić (qualifying competition)
16. (Slovakia) Magdaléna Rybáriková (withdrew because of her qualification for the Citi Open final)
17. (United States) Irina Falconi (second round)
18. (Kazakhstan) Sesil Karatantcheva (qualified)

=== Qualifiers ===
1. (Georgia (country)) Anna Tatishvili
2. (Kazakhstan) Sesil Karatantcheva
3. (France) Aravane Rezaï
4. (Portugal) Michelle Larcher de Brito
5. (Slovakia) Jana Čepelová
6. (Netherlands) Arantxa Rus
7. (Hungary) Tímea Babos
8. (Netherlands) Kiki Bertens

=== Lucky losers ===
1. (Poland) Urszula Radwańska
2. (Kazakhstan) Galina Voskoboeva

=== Draw ===
==== First qualifier ====
First round
(Canada) Gabriela Dabrowski	3	0
(United States) Melanie Oudin	6	6
(United States) Ashley Weinhold	6	6
(Thailand) Tamarine Tanasugarn	3	4
(Canada) Sharon Fichman	5	1
11	(Georgia (country)) Anna Tatishvili	7	6

Second round
1	(Poland) Urszula Radwańska	6	2	6
(United States) Melanie Oudin	1	6	1
(United States) Ashley Weinhold	0	2
11	(Georgia (country)) Anna Tatishvili	6	6

Qualifying competition
1	(Poland) Urszula Radwańska	4	0
11	(Georgia (country)) Anna Tatishvili	6	6

==== Second qualifier ====
First round
(Poland) Alicja Rosolska	1	2
WC	(Canada) Françoise Abanda	6	6
WC	(Hungary) Katalin Marosi	6	4	6
WC	(Canada) Marianne Jodoin	2	6	2
(United States) Lena Litvak	3	2
18	(Kazakhstan) Sesil Karatantcheva	6	6

Second round
17	(United States) Irina Falconi	4	0
WC	(Canada) Françoise Abanda	6	6
WC	(Hungary) Katalin Marosi	3	3
18	(Kazakhstan) Sesil Karatantcheva	6	6

Qualifying competition
WC	(Canada) Françoise Abanda	0	3
18	(Kazakhstan) Sesil Karatantcheva	6	6

==== Third qualifier ====
First round
WC	(United States) Danielle Mills	1	0
(Ukraine) Olga Savchuk	6	6
(Canada) Marie-Ève Pelletier	6	6^{8}	6^{7}
(France) Aravane Rezaï	2	7^{10}	7^{9}
WC	(United States) Tori Kinard	7	6
13	(United States) Julia Cohen	5	3

Second round
3	(Kazakhstan) Galina Voskoboeva	6	5	6
(Ukraine) Olga Savchuk	1	7	4
(France) Aravane Rezaï	6	6
WC	(United States) Tori Kinard	3	4

Qualifying competition
3	(Kazakhstan) Galina Voskoboeva	4	6	1
(France) Aravane Rezaï	6	3	6

==== Fourth qualifier ====
First round
(Portugal) Michelle Larcher de Brito	7	6
(France) Kristina Mladenovic	5	2
(Chinese Taipei) Chang Kai-chen	6	6
(United States) Jill Craybas	2	3
WC	(Canada) Sonja Molnar	3	3
15	(Croatia) Mirjana Lučić	6	6

Second round
4	(Czech Republic) Barbora Záhlavová-Strýcová	1	2
(Portugal) Michelle Larcher de Brito	6	6
(Chinese Taipei) Chang Kai-chen	2	1
15	(Croatia) Mirjana Lučić	6	6

Qualifying competition
(Portugal) Michelle Larcher de Brito	2	6	6
15	(Croatia) Mirjana Lučić	6	1	3

==== Fifth qualifier ====
First round
WC	(United States) Megan Moulton-Levy	3	4
WC	(Canada) Erin Routliffe	6	6
(Slovakia) Jana Čepelová	6	6
9	(Luxembourg) Mandy Minella	3	2

Second round
5	(Czech Republic) Iveta Benešová	6	6
WC	(Canada) Erin Routliffe	2	2
(United States) Madison Brengle	6	4	2
(Slovakia) Jana Čepelová	3	6	6

Qualifying competition
5	(Czech Republic) Iveta Benešová	3	5
(Slovakia) Jana Čepelová	6	7

==== Sixth qualifier ====
First round
(Spain) Estrella Cabeza Candela	3	6	6
WC	(Canada) Carol Zhao	6	2	2
(Australia) Anastasia Rodionova	6	6
(United States) Bethanie Mattek-Sands	2	2
WC	(United States) Jennifer Elie	3	4
14	(Russia) Vera Dushevina	6	6

Second round
6	(Netherlands) Arantxa Rus	w/o
(Spain) Estrella Cabeza Candela
(Australia) Anastasia Rodionova	4	1
14	(Russia) Vera Dushevina	6	6

Qualifying competition
6	(Netherlands) Arantxa Rus	6	4	7^{7}
14	(Russia) Vera Dushevina	3	6	6^{1}

==== Seventh qualifier ====
First round
7	(Hungary) Tímea Babos	7	7^{7}
(South Africa) Natalie Grandin	5	6^{3}
(United States) Maria Sanchez	6	4	1
(United States) Lauren Davis	4	6	6
(Russia) Alla Kudryavtseva	6	6
WC	(Croatia) Darija Jurak	4	2
(United States) Julia Boserup	3	1
12	(Sweden) Johanna Larsson	6	6

Second round
7	(Hungary) Tímea Babos	3	6	6
(United States) Lauren Davis	6	4	3
(Russia) Alla Kudryavtseva	6	3	5
12	(Sweden) Johanna Larsson	4	6	7

Qualifying competition
7	(Hungary) Tímea Babos	4	6	6
12	(Sweden) Johanna Larsson	6	4	4

==== Eighth qualifier ====
First round
8	(Serbia) Bojana Jovanovski	6^{5}	6	4
(United States) Alexa Glatch	7^{7}	4	6
(Japan) Misaki Doi	4	7	6
(Greece) Eleni Daniilidou	6	5	1
(Czech Republic) Vladimíra Uhlířová	4	3
10	(Netherlands) Kiki Bertens	6	6

Second round
(United States) Alexa Glatch	6	6
(Japan) Misaki Doi	1	3
(China) Zhang Shuai	7	5	3
10	(Netherlands) Kiki Bertens	5	7	6

Qualifying competition
(United States) Alexa Glatch	4	2
10	(Netherlands) Kiki Bertens	6	6
