= 2012 BNP Paribas Open =

- Date: March 5–18
- Edition: 39th (ATP) / 24th (WTA)
- Category: World Tour Masters 1000 (ATP); Premier Mandatory (WTA)
- Prize money: $4,694,696
- Surface: Hard / outdoor
- Location: Indian Wells, California, US
- Venue: Indian Wells Tennis Garden

Champions

Men's singles
- (Switzerland) Roger Federer

Women's singles
- (Belarus) Victoria Azarenka

Men's doubles
- (Spain) Marc López / (Spain) Rafael Nadal

Women's doubles
- (United States) Liezel Huber / (United States) Lisa Raymond
← 2011 ·	Indian Wells Open	· 2013 →

The 2012 BNP Paribas Open (also known as the 2012 Indian Wells Open) was a professional tennis tournament played at Indian Wells, California in March 2012. It was the 39th edition of the men's event (24th for the women), known as the BNP Paribas Open, and was classified as an ATP World Tour Masters 1000 event on the 2012 ATP World Tour and a Premier Mandatory event on the 2012 WTA Tour. Both the men's and the women's events took place at the Indian Wells Tennis Garden in Indian Wells, California, United States from March 5 through March 18, 2012 and were played on outdoor hard courts. Roger Federer and Victoria Azarenka won the singles titles.

== Finals ==
=== Men's singles ===
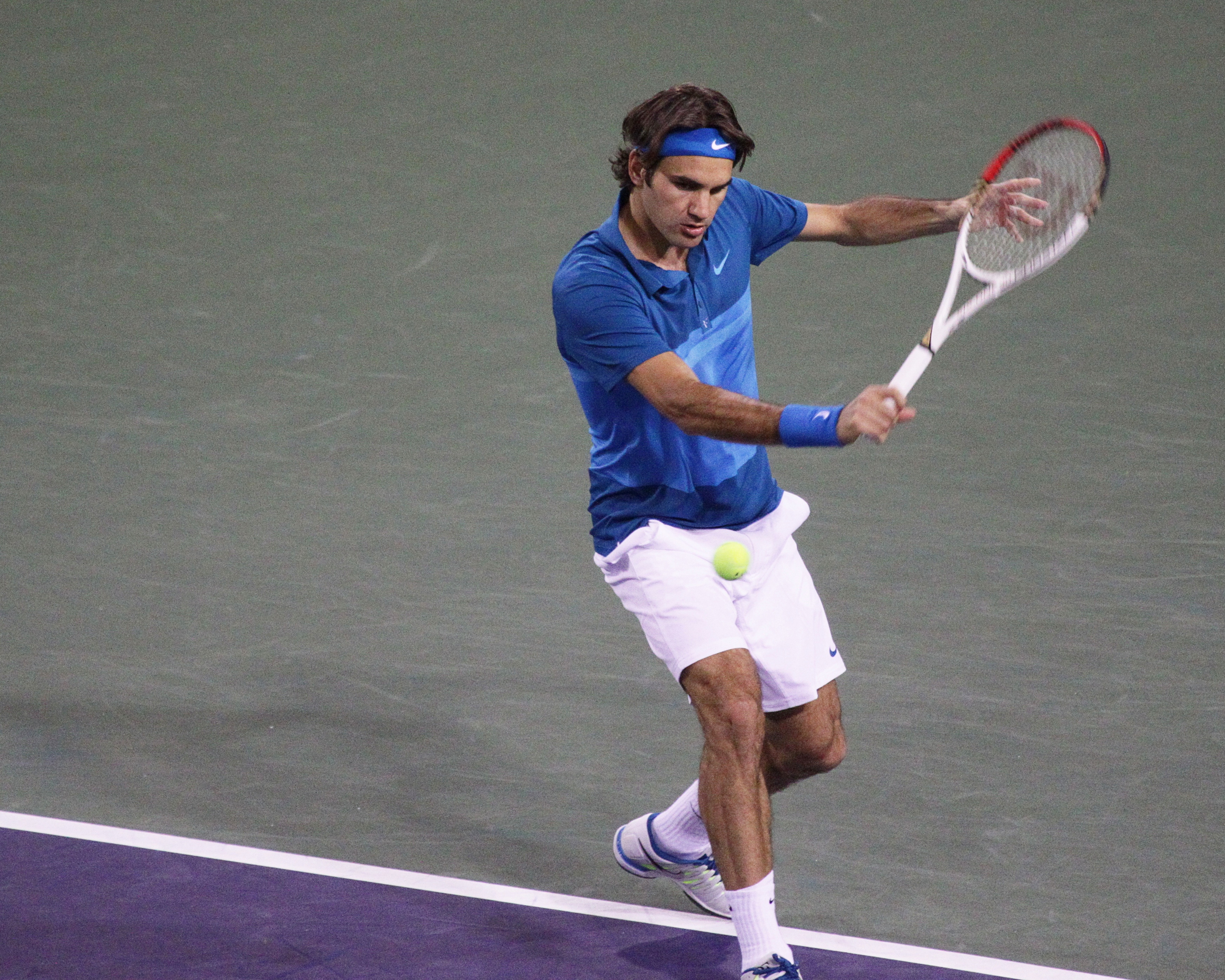
Singles champion Roger Federer wins a record 4th title in Indian Wells.

- (Switzerland) Roger Federer defeated (United States) John Isner, 7–6^{(9–7)}, 6–3
- It was Federer's 3rd title of the year and 73rd of his career. It was his 4th win at Indian Wells, also winning in 2004, 2005, and 2006. It was his 19th career Masters win, tying the record held by Rafael Nadal.

=== Women's singles ===
- (Belarus) Victoria Azarenka defeated (Russia) Maria Sharapova, 6–2, 6–3.
- It was Azarenka's 4th title of the year and 12th of her career. Azarenka is now 23–0 for the year. It was her 3rd career Premier Mandatory event and 7th Premier overall.

=== Men's doubles ===
- (Spain) Marc López / (Spain) Rafael Nadal defeated (United States) John Isner / (United States) Sam Querrey, 6–2, 7–6^{(7–3)}

=== Women's doubles ===
- (United States) Liezel Huber / (United States) Lisa Raymond defeated (India) Sania Mirza / (Russia) Elena Vesnina, 6–2, 6–3.

== Points and prize money ==
=== Point distribution ===
Stage	Men's singles	Men's doubles	Women's singles	Women's doubles
Champion	1000			
Runner up	600		700	
Semifinals	360		450	
Quarterfinals	180		250	
Round of 16	90		140	
Round of 32	45	10	80	5
Round of 64	25 (10)	–	50 (5)	–
Round of 128	10	–	5	–
Qualifier	16	–	30	–
Qualifying Finalist	8	–	20	–
Qualifying 1st round		–	1	–

=== Prize money ===
All money is in US dollars

Stage	Men's singles	Men's doubles	Women's singles	Women's doubles
Champion	$1,000,000	$241,000	$1,000,000	$241,000
Runner up	$500,000	$121,000	$500,000	$121,000
Semifinals	$200,000	$55,000	$200,000	$55,000
Quarterfinals	$100,000	$27,041	$100,000	$27,041
Round of 16	$43,520	$14,259	$43,520	$14,259
Round of 32	$23,291	$7,632	$23,291	$7,632
Round of 64	$12,725	–	$12,725	–
Round of 96	$7,709	–	$7,709	–
Final round qualifying	$2,296	–	$2,296	–
First round qualifying	$1,175	–	$1,175	–

== Players ==
=== Men's singles ===
==== Seeds ====
Country	Player	Rank^{1}	Seed
SRB	Novak Djokovic	1	1
ESP	Rafael Nadal	2	2
SUI	Roger Federer	3	3
GRB	Andy Murray	4	4
ESP	David Ferrer	5	5
FRA	Jo-Wilfried Tsonga	6	6
CZE	Tomáš Berdych	7	7
USA	Mardy Fish	8	8
ARG	Juan Martín del Potro	9	9
SRB	Janko Tipsarević	10	10
USA	John Isner	11	11
ESP	Nicolás Almagro	12	12
FRA	Gilles Simon	13	13
FRA	Gaël Monfils	14	14
ESP	Feliciano López	15	15
FRA	Richard Gasquet	16	16
JPN	Kei Nishikori	17	17
GER	Florian Mayer	18	18
ESP	Fernando Verdasco	19	19
AUT	Jürgen Melzer	20	20
UKR	Alexandr Dolgopolov	21	21
ARG	Juan Mónaco	22	22
SUI	Stanislas Wawrinka	23	23
CRO	Marin Čilić	24	24
SRB	Viktor Troicki	25	25
ESP	Marcel Granollers	26	26
CAN	Milos Raonic	27	27
CZE	Radek Štěpánek	28	28
RSA	Kevin Anderson	30	29
USA	Andy Roddick	31	30
ARG	Juan Ignacio Chela	32	31
FRA	Julien Benneteau	33	32

- ^{1} Rankings are as of March 5, 2012

==== Other entrants ====
The following players got wildcards into the singles main draw:

- (United States) Robby Ginepri
- (United States) Denis Kudla
- (United States) Jesse Levine
- (United States) Sam Querrey
- (United States) Jack Sock

The following player received entry using a protected ranking into the singles main draw:

- (Germany) Tommy Haas

The following players received entry from the qualifying draw:

- (Belgium) Ruben Bemelmans
- (Ukraine) Sergei Bubka
- (Bosnia and Herzegovina) Amer Delić
- (South Africa) Rik de Voest
- (Australia) Matthew Ebden
- (Kazakhstan) Andrey Golubev
- (Italy) Paolo Lorenzi
- (Australia) Marinko Matosevic
- (Canada) Vasek Pospisil
- (United States) Bobby Reynolds
- (United States) Tim Smyczek
- (United States) Rhyne Williams

The following players received entry as lucky losers:

- (Portugal) Frederico Gil
- (Germany) Tobias Kamke
- (Germany) Björn Phau

==== Withdrawals ====
- (United States) James Blake → replaced by (Germany) Matthias Bachinger
- (Spain) Juan Carlos Ferrero → replaced by (Portugal) Frederico Gil
- (Italy) Fabio Fognini → replaced by (Chinese Taipei) Lu Yen-hsun
- (Croatia) Ivan Ljubičić → replaced by (Argentina) Leonardo Mayer
- (France) Gaël Monfils (gastroenteritis) → replaced by (Germany) Björn Phau
- (Spain) Albert Montañés → replaced by (France) Benoît Paire
- (Germany) Philipp Petzschner → replaced by (Argentina) David Nalbandian
- (Spain) Tommy Robredo → replaced by (France) Nicolas Mahut
- (Sweden) Robin Söderling (mononucleosis) → replaced by (France) Jérémy Chardy
- (Russia) Dmitry Tursunov → replaced by (Germany) Tobias Kamke
- (Italy) Filippo Volandri → replaced by (Germany) Cedrik-Marcel Stebe
- (Russia) Mikhail Youzhny → replaced by (Belgium) Steve Darcis

==== Retirements ====
- (Russia) Nikolay Davydenko (illness)
- (Germany) Philipp Kohlschreiber (illness)
- (France) Michaël Llodra (knee injury)
- (Italy) Andreas Seppi (illness)

=== Men's doubles ===
==== Seeds ====
Country	Player	Country	Player	Rank^{1}	Seed
USA	Bob Bryan	USA	Mike Bryan	2	1
BLR	Max Mirnyi	CAN	Daniel Nestor	6	2
FRA	Michaël Llodra	SRB	Nenad Zimonjić	11	3
SWE	Robert Lindstedt	ROU	Horia Tecău	19	4
IND	Mahesh Bhupathi	IND	Rohan Bopanna	20	5
POL	Mariusz Fyrstenberg	POL	Marcin Matkowski	26	6
IND	Leander Paes	CZE	Radek Štěpánek	29	7
AUT	Oliver Marach	AUT	Alexander Peya	42	8

- Rankings are as of March 5, 2012

==== Other entrants ====
The following pairs received wildcards into the doubles main draw:

- (Spain) Nicolás Almagro / (The Bahamas) Mark Knowles
- (Australia) Matthew Ebden / (United States) Ryan Harrison

The following pair received entry as alternates:

- (Argentina) Carlos Berlocq / (Argentina) Juan Ignacio Chela

==== Retirements ====
- (Austria) Jürgen Melzer (illness)

=== Women's singles ===
==== Seeds ====
Country	Player	Rank^{1}	Seed
BLR	Victoria Azarenka	1	1
RUS	Maria Sharapova	2	2
CZE	Petra Kvitová	3	3
DEN	Caroline Wozniacki	4	4
POL	Agnieszka Radwańska	5	5
AUS	Samantha Stosur	6	6
FRA	Marion Bartoli	7	7
CHN	Li Na	8	8
RUS	Vera Zvonareva	9	9
ITA	Francesca Schiavone	12	10
GER	Sabine Lisicki	13	11
SRB	Jelena Janković	14	12
RUS	Anastasia Pavlyuchenkova	15	13
GER	Julia Görges	16	14
SRB	Ana Ivanovic	17	15
SVK	Dominika Cibulková	18	16
CHN	Peng Shuai	19	17
GER	Angelique Kerber	20	18
SVK	Daniela Hantuchová	21	19
RUS	Maria Kirilenko	22	20
ITA	Roberta Vinci	23	21
BEL	Yanina Wickmayer	24	22
CZE	Lucie Šafářová	25	23
ESP	Anabel Medina Garrigues	26	24
RUS	Svetlana Kuznetsova	27	25
ROU	Monica Niculescu	28	26
ITA	Flavia Pennetta	29	27
CZE	Petra Cetkovská	30	28
EST	Kaia Kanepi	31	29
RUS	Nadia Petrova	32	30
CHN	Zheng Jie	33	31
USA	Christina McHale	34	32

- ^{1} Rankings are as of February 27, 2012

==== Other entrants ====
The following players received wildcards into the main draw:

- (United States) Jill Craybas
- (United States) Lauren Davis
- (United States) Irina Falconi
- (United States) Jamie Hampton
- (India) Sania Mirza
- (Poland) Urszula Radwańska
- (United States) Sloane Stephens
- (United States) Coco Vandeweghe

The following player received entry using a protected ranking:

- (Switzerland) Timea Bacsinszky

The following players received entry from the qualifying draw:

- (Hungary) Gréta Arn
- (Germany) Kristina Barrois
- (Greece) Eleni Daniilidou
- (Australia) Casey Dellacqua
- (Belarus) Olga Govortsova
- (Netherlands) Michaëlla Krajicek
- (United States) Varvara Lepchenko
- (Russia) Alexandra Panova
- (United States) Jessica Pegula
- (Ukraine) Lesia Tsurenko
- (Canada) Aleksandra Wozniak
- (China) Zhang Shuai

==== Withdrawals ====
- (United States) Serena Williams (continued boycott of the event since 2001) → replaced by (Sweden) Sofia Arvidsson
- (Russia) Anna Chakvetadze → replaced by (Netherlands) Arantxa Rus
- (Belgium) Kim Clijsters (left ankle injury) → replaced by (Spain) Lourdes Domínguez Lino
- (Canada) Rebecca Marino → replaced by (Japan) Kimiko Date-Krumm
- (Germany) Andrea Petkovic (lower back injury) → replaced by (Spain) Sílvia Soler Espinosa

==== Retirements ====
- (Hungary) Gréta Arn (neck injury)
- (Australia) Jelena Dokić (wrist injury)
- (Romania) Alexandra Dulgheru (knee injury)
- (United States) Jamie Hampton
- (Serbia) Ana Ivanovic (hip injury)
- (United States) Vania King (illness)
- (Austria) Tamira Paszek
- (Slovakia) Magdaléna Rybáriková
- (Italy) Francesca Schiavone (illness)
- (Russia) Vera Zvonareva (intestinal illness)

=== Women's doubles ===
==== Seeds ====
Country	Player	Country	Player	Rank^{1}	Seed
USA	Liezel Huber	USA	Lisa Raymond	3	1
IND	Sania Mirza	RUS	Elena Vesnina	15	2
CZE	Andrea Hlaváčková	CZE	Lucie Hradecká	20	3
RUS	Maria Kirilenko	RUS	Nadia Petrova	26	4
ITA	Sara Errani	ITA	Roberta Vinci	29	5
ESP	Anabel Medina Garrigues	ITA	Flavia Pennetta	46	6
ESP	Nuria Llagostera Vives	ESP	Arantxa Parra Santonja	49	7
GER	Anna-Lena Grönefeld	USA	Vania King	52	8

- Rankings are as of February 27, 2012

==== Other entrants ====
The following pairs received wildcards into the doubles main draw:

- (Belarus) Victoria Azarenka / (Czech Republic) Petra Kvitová
- (Greece) Eleni Daniilidou / (Serbia) Jelena Janković
- (Argentina) Gisela Dulko / (Argentina) Paola Suárez
- (United States) Jamie Hampton / (United States) Christina McHale
