= 2009 BNP Paribas Open – Men's doubles =

Men's doubles
- 2009 BNP Paribas Open

Final
- Champions: (United States) Mardy Fish (United States) Andy Roddick
- Runners-up: (Belarus) Max Mirnyi (Israel) Andy Ram
- Score: 3–6, 6–1, [14–12]

Events
Singles	men	women
Doubles	men	women
← 2008 ·	BNP Paribas Open	· 2010 →

Jonathan Erlich and Andy Ram were the defending champions, but Erlich chose not to participate due to injury, and only Ram competed that year.
Ram partnered with Max Mirnyi, they lost in the final to Mardy Fish and Andy Roddick 6–3, 1–6, [12–14]

== Seeds ==
1. (United States) Bob Bryan / (United States) Mike Bryan (semifinals)
2. (Canada) Daniel Nestor / (Serbia) Nenad Zimonjić (first round)
3. (India) Mahesh Bhupathi / (The Bahamas) Mark Knowles (second round)
4. (Czech Republic) Lukáš Dlouhý / (India) Leander Paes (second round)
5. (Poland) Mariusz Fyrstenberg / (Poland) Marcin Matkowski (quarterfinals)
6. (Brazil) Bruno Soares / (Zimbabwe) Kevin Ullyett (first round)
7. (South Africa) Jeff Coetzee / (South Africa) Wesley Moodie (first round)
8. (Brazil) Marcelo Melo / (Brazil) André Sá (second round)

== Draw ==
=== Key ===
- Q = Qualifier
- WC = Wild card
- LL = Lucky loser
- Alt = Alternate
- SE = Special exempt
- PR = Protected ranking
- ITF = ITF entry
- JE = Junior exempt
- w/o = Walkover
- r = Retired
- d = Defaulted
- SR = Special ranking

=== Finals ===
Semifinals
1	(United States) Bob Bryan (United States) Mike Bryan	2	4
(Belarus) Max Mirnyi (Israel) Andy Ram	6	6
(United States) Mardy Fish (United States) Andy Roddick	6	7^{7}
(France) Richard Gasquet (Switzerland) Stanislas Wawrinka	4	6^{4}

Final
(Belarus) Max Mirnyi (Israel) Andy Ram	6	1	[12]
(United States) Mardy Fish (United States) Andy Roddick	3	6	[14]

=== Top half ===
First round
1	(United States) B Bryan (United States) M Bryan	6	6
WC	(Switzerland) Y Allegro (Switzerland) R Federer	2	0
WC	(Spain) M López (Spain) R Nadal	7^{7}	4	[10]
(Czech Republic) F Čermák (Slovakia) M Mertiňák	6^{2}	6	[7]
(Croatia) I Karlović (Serbia) D Vemić	4	4
(Spain) D Ferrer (Spain) A Montañés	6	6
(Spain) F López (Spain) F Verdasco	7^{9}	1	[2]
5	(Poland) M Fyrstenberg (Poland) M Matkowski	6^{7}	6	[10]
3	(India) M Bhupathi (The Bahamas) M Knowles	7	6
(Russia) I Kunitsyn (Russia) D Tursunov	5	3
(Belarus) M Mirnyi (Israel) A Ram	6	6^{5}	[12]
(Czech Republic) M Damm (Sweden) R Lindstedt	3	7^{7}	[10]
(Czech Republic) T Berdych (Germany) N Kiefer	4	6	[7]
(United Kingdom) R Hutchins (United Kingdom) A Murray	6	0	[10]
ALT	(France) P-H Mathieu (Russia) M Safin	7^{7}	2	[8]
8	(Brazil) M Melo (Brazil) A Sá	6^{4}	6	[10]

Second round
1	(United States) B Bryan (United States) M Bryan	6	6
WC	(Spain) M López (Spain) R Nadal	4	3
(Spain) D Ferrer (Spain) A Montañés	6	6^{6}	[4]
5	(Poland) M Fyrstenberg (Poland) M Matkowski	4	7^{8}	[10]
3	(India) M Bhupathi (The Bahamas) M Knowles	6^{2}	4
(Belarus) M Mirnyi (Israel) A Ram	7^{7}	6
(United Kingdom) R Hutchins (United Kingdom) A Murray	6	6
8	(Brazil) M Melo (Brazil) A Sá	1	3

Quarterfinals
1	(United States) B Bryan (United States) M Bryan	6	7^{7}
5	(Poland) M Fyrstenberg (Poland) M Matkowski	2	6^{1}
(Belarus) M Mirnyi (Israel) A Ram	6	7^{7}
(United Kingdom) R Hutchins (United Kingdom) A Murray	4	6^{4}

Semifinals
1	(United States) B Bryan (United States) M Bryan	2	4
(Belarus) M Mirnyi (Israel) A Ram	6	6

=== Bottom half ===
First round
7	(South Africa) J Coetzee (South Africa) W Moodie	3	3
(France) M Llodra (Czech Republic) R Štěpánek	6	6
(United States) M Fish (United States) A Roddick	6	6
(France) J Chardy (France) G Simon	3	4
(Sweden) S Aspelin (United Kingdom) J Murray	5	4
(Argentina) JM del Potro (Argentina) D Nalbandian	7	6
(Austria) J Knowle (Austria) J Melzer	4	6	[8]
4	(Czech Republic) L Dlouhý (India) L Paes	6	3	[10]
6	(Brazil) B Soares (Zimbabwe) K Ullyett	4	6^{5}
(United States) T Parrott (Slovakia) F Polášek	6	7^{7}
(Chile) F González (Spain) T Robredo	6	6
(Germany) R Schüttler (Sweden) R Söderling	3	1
(Poland) Ł Kubot (Austria) O Marach	7^{7}	6
(France) G Monfils (Germany) M Zverev	6^{2}	0
(France) R Gasquet (Switzerland) S Wawrinka	7^{9}	6
2	(Canada) D Nestor (Serbia) N Zimonjić	6^{7}	4

Second round
(France) M Llodra (Czech Republic) R Štěpánek	4	6^{6}
(United States) M Fish (United States) A Roddick	6	7^{8}
(Argentina) JM del Potro (Argentina) D Nalbandian	7^{8}	7^{7}
4	(Czech Republic) L Dlouhý (India) L Paes	6^{6}	6^{5}
(United States) T Parrott (Slovakia) F Polášek	6^{4}	6^{6}
(Chile) F González (Spain) T Robredo	7^{7}	7^{8}
(Poland) Ł Kubot (Austria) O Marach	5	6	[6]
(France) R Gasquet (Switzerland) S Wawrinka	7	3	[10]

Quarterfinals
(United States) M Fish (United States) A Roddick	6	6
(Argentina) JM del Potro (Argentina) D Nalbandian	1	1
(Chile) F González (Spain) T Robredo
(France) R Gasquet (Switzerland) S Wawrinka	w/o

Semifinals
(United States) M Fish (United States) A Roddick	6	7^{7}
(France) R Gasquet (Switzerland) S Wawrinka	4	6^{4}
