= 2012 Rogers Cup – Men's singles =

Men's singles
- 2012 Rogers Cup

Final
- Champion: (Serbia) Novak Djokovic
- Runner-up: (France) Richard Gasquet
- Score: 6–3, 6–2

Events
Singles	men	women
Doubles	men	women
← 2011 ·	Rogers Cup	· 2013 →

Defending champion Novak Djokovic defeated Richard Gasquet in the final, 6–3, 6–2 to win the men's singles tennis title at the 2012 Canadian Open.

== Seeds ==
All seeds receive a bye into the second round.

1. (Serbia) Novak Djokovic (champion)
2. (United Kingdom) Andy Murray (third round, withdrew because of a knee injury)
3. (France) Jo-Wilfried Tsonga (second round)
4. (Czech Republic) Tomáš Berdych (third round)
5. (Serbia) Janko Tipsarević (semifinals)
6. (Argentina) Juan Martín del Potro (second round)
7. (Argentina) Juan Mónaco (third round)
8. (United States) John Isner (semifinals)
9. (France) Gilles Simon (second round)
10. (Croatia) Marin Čilić (third round)
11. (United States) Mardy Fish (quarterfinals)
12. (Germany) Philipp Kohlschreiber (third round)
13. (Japan) Kei Nishikori (second round)
14. (France) Richard Gasquet (final)
15. (Germany) Florian Mayer (second round)
16. (Canada) Milos Raonic (quarterfinals)

== Draw ==
=== Key ===
- Q = Qualifier
- WC = Wild card
- LL = Lucky loser
- Alt = Alternate
- ITF = ITF entry
- PR = Protected ranking
- SR = Special ranking
- SE = Special exempt
- JE = Junior exempt
- JR = Junior Accelerator Programme entrant
- CO = College Accelerator Programme entrant
- NG = Next Gen Accelerator Program entrant
- w/o = Walkover
- r = Retired
- d = Defaulted

=== Finals ===
Quarterfinals
1	(Serbia) Novak Djokovic	6	3	6
(Germany) Tommy Haas	3	6	3
(Spain) Marcel Granollers	4	4
5	(Serbia) Janko Tipsarević	6	6
11	(United States) Mardy Fish	7	1	2
14	(France) Richard Gasquet	5	6	6
8	(United States) John Isner	7^{11}	6
16	(Canada) Milos Raonic	6^{9}	4

Semifinals
1	(Serbia) Novak Djokovic	6	6
5	(Serbia) Janko Tipsarević	4	1
14	(France) Richard Gasquet	7^{7}	6
8	(United States) John Isner	6^{3}	3

Final
1	(Serbia) Novak Djokovic	6	6
14	(France) Richard Gasquet	3	2

=== Top half ===
==== Section 1 ====
First round
Q	(Germany) M Berrer	3	6	3
(Australia) B Tomic	6	3	6
SE	(United States) S Querrey	6	6
(Austria) J Melzer	3	2
(Germany) T Haas	6	6^{11}	6
(Argentina) D Nalbandian	2	7^{13}	3
(Czech Republic) R Štěpánek	6	6
(Ukraine) A Dolgopolov	3	1

Second round
1	(Serbia) N Djokovic	6	6
(Australia) B Tomic	2	3
SE	(United States) S Querrey	6	6
13	(Japan) K Nishikori	2	3
9	(France) G Simon	2	3
(Germany) T Haas	6	6
(Czech Republic) R Štěpánek	6	7^{7}
6	(Argentina) JM del Potro	4	6^{5}

Third round
1	(Serbia) N Djokovic	6	6
SE	(United States) S Querrey	4	4
(Germany) T Haas	2	6	6
(Czech Republic) R Štěpánek	6	4	1

Quarterfinals
1	(Serbia) N Djokovic	6	3	6
(Germany) T Haas	3	6	3

==== Section 2 ====
First round
(France) J Chardy	3	7^{7}	6
(United States) D Young	6	6^{2}	0
Q	(Ukraine) S Stakhovsky	6	4	3
(Spain) M Granollers	4	6	6
(Argentina) C Berlocq	4	3
(Cyprus) M Baghdatis	6	6
(South Africa) K Anderson	1	6^{3}
(Russia) M Youzhny	6	7^{7}

Second round
3	(France) J-W Tsonga	4	6^{4}
(France) J Chardy	6	7^{7}
(Spain) M Granollers	6	6
15	(Germany) F Mayer	3	4
10	(Croatia) M Čilić	7	6
(Cyprus) M Baghdatis	5	3
(Russia) M Youzhny	6^{2}	4
5	(Serbia) J Tipsarević	7^{7}	6

Third round
(France) J Chardy	1	4
(Spain) M Granollers	6	6
10	(Croatia) M Čilić	2	4
5	(Serbia) J Tipsarević	6	6

Quarterfinals
(Spain) M Granollers	4	4
5	(Serbia) J Tipsarević	6	6

=== Bottom half ===
==== Section 3 ====
First round
WC	(Canada) V Pospisil	4	6	7^{8}
(Italy) A Seppi	6	4	6^{6}
WC	(Canada) P Polansky	6	4	3
LL	(Australia) M Ebden	0	6	6
(Kazakhstan) M Kukushkin	6	7
WC	(Canada) F Dancevic	3	5
Q	(United States) W Odesnik	4	4
(France) J Benneteau	6	6

Second round
7	(Argentina) J Mónaco	7	6
WC	(Canada) V Pospisil	5	4
LL	(Australia) M Ebden	2	0
11	(United States) M Fish	6	6
14	(France) R Gasquet	6	7
(Kazakhstan) M Kukushkin	3	5
(France) J Benneteau	7^{12}	4	4
4	(Czech Republic) T Berdych	6^{10}	6	6

Third round
7	(Argentina) J Mónaco	6	1	4
11	(United States) M Fish	2	6	6
14	(France) R Gasquet	6	6
4	(Czech Republic) T Berdych	4	2

Quarterfinals
11	(United States) M Fish	7	1	2
14	(France) R Gasquet	5	6	6

==== Section 4 ====
First round
(Spain) P Andújar	6	4	6
(Slovakia) L Lacko	2	6	2
(Chinese Taipei) Y-h Lu	6^{7}	7	6^{5}
Q	(Italy) F Fognini	7^{9}	5	7^{7}
(Russia) A Bogomolov Jr.	4	6^{5}
(Serbia) V Troicki	6	7^{7}
Q	(Italy) F Cipolla	6	6
Q	(Estonia) J Zopp	1	2

Second round
8	(United States) J Isner	7^{7}	7
(Spain) P Andújar	6^{5}	5
Q	(Italy) F Fognini	2	2
12	(Germany) P Kohlschreiber	6	6
16	(Canada) M Raonic	6	6
(Serbia) V Troicki	3	4
Q	(Italy) F Cipolla	1	3
2	(United Kingdom) A Murray	6	6

Third round
8	(United States) J Isner	6^{3}	6	6
12	(Germany) P Kohlschreiber	7^{7}	4	4
16	(Canada) M Raonic	w/o
2	(United Kingdom) A Murray

Quarterfinals
8	(United States) J Isner	7^{11}	6
16	(Canada) M Raonic	6^{9}	4

== Qualifying ==
=== Seeds ===
1. (Bulgaria) Grigor Dimitrov (first round)
2. (Argentina) Leonardo Mayer (first round, retired because of fatigue)
3. (Australia) Marinko Matosevic (first round)
4. (Italy) Fabio Fognini (qualified)
5. (Australia) Matthew Ebden (qualifying competition, lucky loser)
6. (United States) Michael Russell (first round)
7. (Estonia) Jürgen Zopp (qualified)
8. (United States) Jesse Levine (first round)
9. (Italy) Flavio Cipolla (qualified)
10. (Ukraine) Sergiy Stakhovsky (qualified)
11. (Croatia) Ivan Dodig (qualifying competition)
12. (Germany) Benjamin Becker (first round)

=== Qualifiers ===
1. (Estonia) Jürgen Zopp
2. (Germany) Michael Berrer
3. (United States) Wayne Odesnik
4. (Italy) Fabio Fognini
5. (Ukraine) Sergiy Stakhovsky
6. (Italy) Flavio Cipolla

=== Lucky loser ===
1. (Australia) Matthew Ebden

=== Draw ===
==== First qualifier ====
First round
1	(Bulgaria) Grigor Dimitrov	2	7	4
(Switzerland) Marco Chiudinelli	6	5	6
WC	(Canada) Milan Pokrajac	2	1
7	(Estonia) Jürgen Zopp	6	6

Qualifying competition
(Switzerland) Marco Chiudinelli	4	6	2
7	(Estonia) Jürgen Zopp	6	4	6

==== Second qualifier ====
First round
2	(Argentina) Leonardo Mayer	3	0^{r}
(Germany) Michael Berrer	6	1
WC	(Canada) Filip Peliwo	3	4
11	(Croatia) Ivan Dodig	6	6

Qualifying competition
(Germany) Michael Berrer	6	6
11	(Croatia) Ivan Dodig	3	4

==== Third qualifier ====
First round
3	(Australia) Marinko Matosevic	3	3
(United States) Wayne Odesnik	6	6
(Russia) Teymuraz Gabashvili	7^{7}	1	6
8	(United States) Jesse Levine	6^{2}	6	4

Qualifying competition
(United States) Wayne Odesnik	6	4	7^{7}
(Russia) Teymuraz Gabashvili	3	6	6^{3}

==== Fourth qualifier ====
First round
4	(Italy) Fabio Fognini	6	6
WC	(Canada) Pavel Krainik	2	3
(United States) Bobby Reynolds	6	6
12	(Germany) Benjamin Becker	4	2

Qualifying competition
4	(Italy) Fabio Fognini	6^{4}	6	6
(United States) Bobby Reynolds	7^{7}	3	4

==== Fifth qualifier ====
First round
5	(Australia) Matthew Ebden	6	3	6
Alt	(Canada) Érik Chvojka	3	6	3
(Chile) Paul Capdeville	1	6	6^{3}
10	(Ukraine) Sergiy Stakhovsky	6	3	7^{7}

Qualifying competition
5	(Australia) Matthew Ebden	3	6	6^{5}
10	(Ukraine) Sergiy Stakhovsky	6	3	7^{7}

==== Sixth qualifier ====
First round
6	(United States) Michael Russell	3	2
(France) Paul-Henri Mathieu	6	6
(Canada) Pierre-Ludovic Duclos	6	2	1
9	(Italy) Flavio Cipolla	4	6	6

Qualifying competition
(France) Paul-Henri Mathieu	7	3	3
9	(Italy) Flavio Cipolla	5	6	6
