= Marc López =

Spanish tennis player (born 1982)

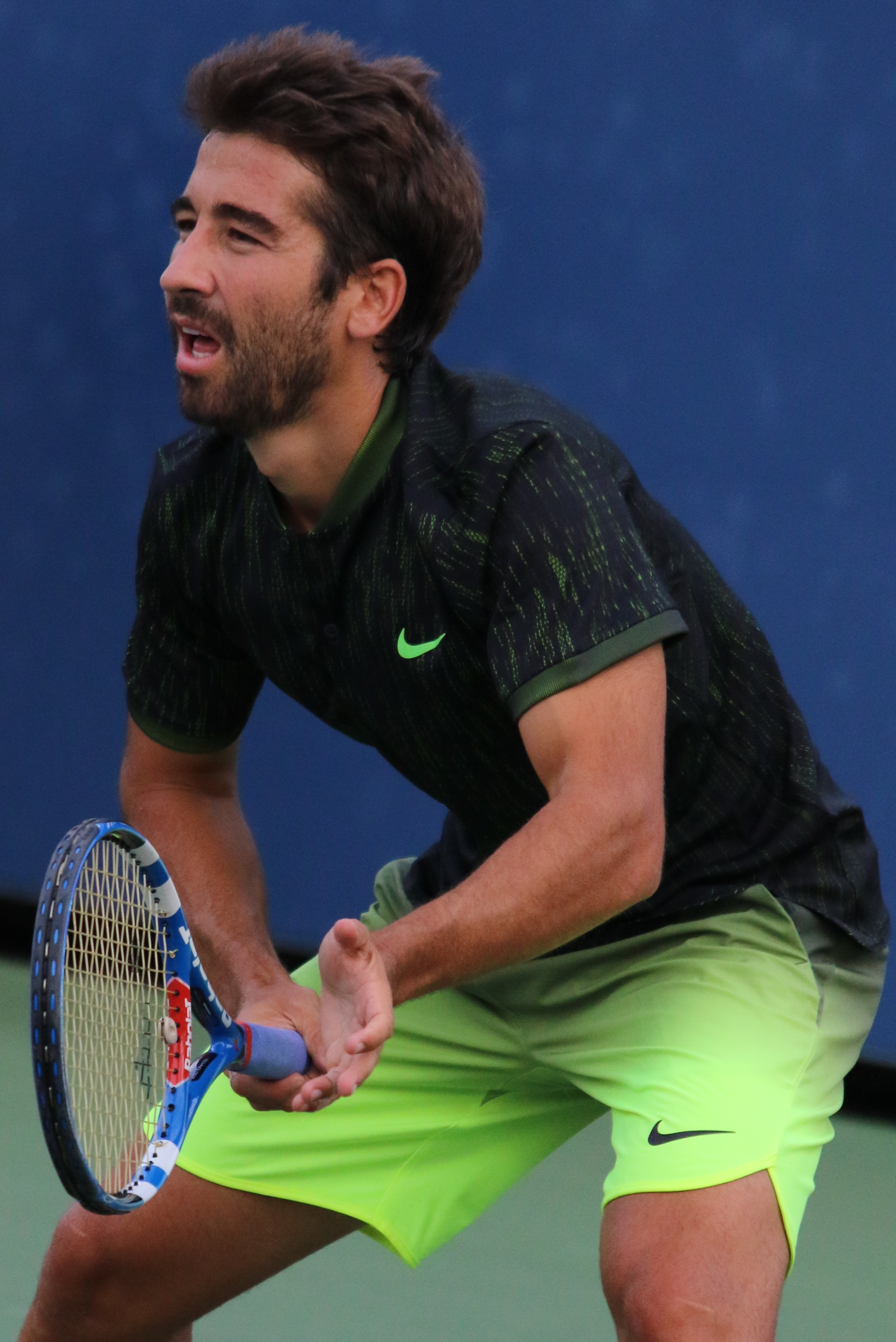
- López at the 2016 US Open
- Country (sports): Spain
- Residence: Barcelona, Spain
- Born: 31 July 1982 (age 44) Barcelona, Spain
- Height: 1.75 m (5 ft 9 in)
- Turned pro: 1999
- Retired: 2022 (last doubles match 2023)
- Plays: Right-handed (two-handed backhand)
- Coach: Carlos Gómez Ferré
- Prize money: US$4,443,757

Singles
- Career record: 23–31
- Career titles: 0
- Highest ranking: No. 106 (10 May 2004)

Grand Slam singles results
- Australian Open: Q3 (2009)
- French Open: 2R (2003)
- Wimbledon: 1R (2004)

Doubles
- Career record: 310–244
- Career titles: 14
- Highest ranking: No. 3 (28 January 2013)

Grand Slam doubles results
- Australian Open: SF (2013)
- French Open: W (2016)
- Wimbledon: 3R (2014)
- US Open: F (2014, 2017)

Other doubles tournaments
- Tour Finals: W (2012)
- Olympic Games: W (2016)

Grand Slam mixed doubles results
- Australian Open: 1R (2011, 2016, 2018)
- French Open: 2R (2011)
- Wimbledon: 1R (2011, 2012, 2021)
- US Open: 1R (2010, 2016, 2017, 2018)

Team competitions
- Davis Cup: F (2012)

Coaching career
- Rafael Nadal (2021–2024); Jasmine Paolini (2025); Marie Bouzková (2025-)
Medal record
Representing Spain
Men's Tennis
Gold medal – first place	2016 Rio de Janeiro	Doubles

Marc López Tarrés (Catalan: [ˈmaɾɡ ˈlɔpəθ təˈres], Spanish: [ˈmaɾɣ ˈlopeθ taˈres]; born 31 July 1982) is a Spanish tennis coach and a former professional player. His career-high ATP ranking was world No. 3 in doubles, achieved in January 2013 and No. 106 in singles, achieved in May 2004.

Partnering with Feliciano López, Marc López won a major title at the 2016 French Open as well as the 2012 ATP Finals with Marcel Granollers. Additionally, at the 2016 Rio Olympics, López won the gold medal in men's doubles for Spain partnering with Rafael Nadal.

Previously, he was Rafael Nadal's and Jasmine Paolini's coach.

== Professional career ==
=== 2001 ===
In his ATP debut at Stuttgart as a qualifier ranked 236, López defeated Richard Fromberg, eventual French Open finalist Guillermo Coria, two-time French Open winner Sergi Bruguera, and Alberto Martín en route to the semifinals, where he lost to Guillermo Cañas.

=== 2004 ===
Although in his beginnings López did not achieve very good results playing doubles, in the last years he has won several doubles titles in Challengers and his best performance in an ATP tournament was in this modality. That was in 2004, when he reached the final of the Open de Tenis Comunidad Valenciana partnering with his friend and countryman Feliciano López.

=== 2008 ===
In April 2008 in Barcelona, López beat No. 141 Yuri Schukin to qualify into the ATP main draw, where he beat No. 68 Ivo Minář before losing to No. 37 Juan Ignacio Chela. In May, he made the main draw of the 2008 French Open as a lucky loser after beating No. 124 Andreas Beck.

=== 2010–2013 ===
In 2010, López won three doubles titles, including the Masters 1000 at Indian Wells partnering with Rafael Nadal. They defeated Daniel Nestor and Serbian Nenad Zimonjić in the final. López made the year-end finals with his frequent partner Marcel Granollers. They won the tournament, defeating the Indian duo of Mahesh Bhupathi and Rohan Bopanna in the final.

In 2012, López and Rafael Nadal, again won the doubles final at Indian Wells, defeating Americans John Isner and Sam Querrey. He and Granollers also won the Masters 1000 in Rome, beating Łukasz Kubot and Janko Tipsarević in the final. In Toronto, they were defeated in the final by the Bryan brothers.

In 2013, they only made one final, in Cincinnati, where they again fell to the Bryan brothers.

=== 2014–2017: French Open title, Olympic Gold medal in doubles ===
In 2014, López and Granollers made two Grand Slam finals. At the French Open they were defeated by French duo Édouard Roger-Vasselin and Julien Benneteau. At the US Open, they lost the final to the Bryan brothers.

In 2015, they again made the Masters 1000 final in Rome, but were defeated by Pablo Cuevas and fellow Spaniard David Marrero.

In 2016, López teamed with countryman Feliciano López to win the tournament in Doha, Qatar, and they also made a runner-up showing in Dubai. López won his first major at the 2016 French Open with Feliciano López.

In 2016 Rio Olympics he teamed up with Rafael Nadal to win the gold medal in the men's doubles event.

On 6 September 2016 at the 2016 US Open, López was part of the last match ever played at the old Louis Armstrong Stadium. Alongside his partner Feliciano López, they defeated the Bryan brothers (Bob and Mike) in the quarterfinals of the men's doubles tournament, the score 7–6^{(7–2)}, 4–6, 6–3. The pair then lost in the semifinals against fellow countrymen Pablo Carreño Busta and Guillermo García López in straight sets.

In 2017, they made another Masters 1000 final in Monte Carlo, but were defeated by Pablo Cuevas and Rohan Bopanna.

At the 2017 US Open, Marc and Feliciano went one step further than the previous year by again defeating the Bryan brothers en route to the final where they lost to Jean-Julien Rojer and Horia Tecău.

=== 2022–2023: Retirement ===
Lopez announced he would retire after the 2022 Barcelona Open. There, he partnered Feliciano López where they defeated the top ranked pair of world No. 1 Joe Salisbury and world No. 2 Rajeev Ram in the first round.

However, he then received a wildcard for the 2022 Madrid Masters to partner Carlos Alcaraz in doubles. The pair lost in the round of 16 to the eventual champions Wesley Koolhof and Neal Skupski.

He played his final match on 31 December 2023, in Brisbane, when he came out of his retirement to play with Rafael Nadal for the very last time.

== Coaching ==
In December 2021, López joined Nadal's coaching team.

López became coach of Olympic gold medalist Jasmine Paolini in April 2025, but they split in July, following her WTA 1000 title at home in Rome.

In December 2025, López started coaching Marie Bouzková.

In October 2026, it was announced that López would become Spain's Davis Cup team captain on 1 January 2027 with a contract running through 2029.

== Significant finals ==
=== Grand Slam finals ===
==== Doubles: 4 (1 title, 3 runners-up) ====
Result	Year	Championship	Surface	Partner	Opponents	Score
Loss	2014	French Open	Clay	(Spain) Marcel Granollers	(France) Julien Benneteau (France) Édouard Roger-Vasselin	3–6, 6–7^{(1–7)}
Loss	2014	US Open	Hard	(Spain) Marcel Granollers	(United States) Bob Bryan (United States) Mike Bryan	3–6, 4–6
Win	2016	French Open	Clay	(Spain) Feliciano López	(United States) Bob Bryan (United States) Mike Bryan	6–4, 6–7^{(6–8)}, 6–3
Loss	2017	US Open	Hard	(Spain) Feliciano López	(Netherlands) Jean-Julien Rojer (Romania) Horia Tecău	3–6, 4–6

=== Year-end championships ===
==== Doubles: 1 (1 title) ====
Result	Year	Championship	Surface	Partner	Opponents	Score
Win	2012	ATP World Tour Finals, London	Hard (i)	(Spain) Marcel Granollers	(India) Mahesh Bhupathi (India) Rohan Bopanna	7–5, 3–6, [10–3]

=== Masters 1000 finals ===
==== Doubles: 7 (3 titles, 4 runners-up) ====
Result	Year	Tournament	Surface	Partner	Opponents	Score
Win	2010	Indian Wells Masters	Hard	(Spain) Rafael Nadal	(Canada) Daniel Nestor (Serbia) Nenad Zimonjić	7–6^{(10–8)}, 6–3
Win	2012	Indian Wells Masters	Hard	(Spain) Rafael Nadal	(United States) John Isner (United States) Sam Querrey	6–2, 7–6^{(7–3)}
Win	2012	Italian Open	Clay	(Spain) Marcel Granollers	(Poland) Łukasz Kubot (Serbia) Janko Tipsarević	6–3, 6–2
Loss	2012	Canadian Open	Hard	(Spain) Marcel Granollers	(United States) Bob Bryan (United States) Mike Bryan	1–6, 6–4, [10–12]
Loss	2013	Cincinnati Masters	Hard	(Spain) Marcel Granollers	(United States) Bob Bryan (United States) Mike Bryan	4–6, 6–4, [4–10]
Loss	2015	Italian Open	Clay	(Spain) Marcel Granollers	(Uruguay) Pablo Cuevas (Spain) David Marrero	4–6, 5–7
Loss	2017	Monte-Carlo Masters	Clay	(Spain) Feliciano López	(India) Rohan Bopanna (Uruguay) Pablo Cuevas	3–6, 6–3, [4–10]

=== Olympic medal matches ===
==== Doubles: 1 (1 gold medal) ====
Result	Year	Championship	Surface	Partner	Opponents	Score
Gold	2016	Summer Olympics, Rio de Janeiro	Hard	(Spain) Rafael Nadal	(Romania) Florin Mergea (Romania) Horia Tecău	6–2, 3–6, 6–4

== ATP career finals ==
=== Doubles: 34 (14 titles, 19 runner-ups) ===
Legend Grand Slam tournaments (1–3) ATP World Tour Finals (1–0) ATP World Tour Masters 1000 (3–4) Olympic Games (1–0) ATP World Tour 500 Series (2–4) ATP World Tour 250 Series (6–8)	Titles by surface Hard (7–7) Clay (7–12) Grass (0–0)	Titles by setting Outdoor (13–17) Indoor (1–2)

Result	W–L	Date	Tournament	Tier	Surface	Partner	Opponents	Score
Loss	0–1	Apr 2004	Valencia Open, Spain	International	Clay	(Spain) Feliciano López	(Argentina) Gastón Etlis (Argentina) Martín Rodríguez	5–7, 6–7^{(5–7)}
Win	1–1	Jan 2009	Qatar Open, Qatar	250 Series	Hard	(Spain) Rafael Nadal	(Canada) Daniel Nestor (Serbia) Nenad Zimonjić	4–6, 6–4, [10–8]
Win	2–1	Mar 2010	Indian Wells Masters, United States	Masters 1000	Hard	(Spain) Rafael Nadal	(Canada) Daniel Nestor (Serbia) Nenad Zimonjić	7–6^{(10–8)}, 6–3
Win	3–1	May 2010	Estoril Open, Portugal	250 Series	Clay	(Spain) David Marrero	(Uruguay) Pablo Cuevas (Spain) Marcel Granollers	6–7^{(1–7)}, 6–4, [10–4]
Win	4–1	Jul 2010	German Open, Germany	500 Series	Clay	(Spain) David Marrero	(France) Jérémy Chardy (France) Paul-Henri Mathieu	6–3, 2–6, [10–8]
Loss	4–2	Oct 2010	Open Sud de France, France	250 Series	Hard (i)	(Argentina) Eduardo Schwank	(Australia) Stephen Huss (United Kingdom) Ross Hutchins	2–6, 6–4, [7–10]
Win	5–2	Jan 2011	Qatar Open (2), Qatar	250 Series	Hard	(Spain) Rafael Nadal	(Italy) Daniele Bracciali (Italy) Andreas Seppi	6–3, 7–6^{(7–4)}
Loss	5–3	Feb 2011	Zagreb Indoors, Croatia	250 Series	Hard (i)	(Spain) Marcel Granollers	(Belgium) Dick Norman (Romania) Horia Tecău	3–6, 4–6
Loss	5–4	May 2011	Estoril Open, Portugal	250 Series	Clay	(Spain) David Marrero	(United States) Eric Butorac (Curaçao) Jean-Julien Rojer	3–6, 4–6
Loss	5–5	Jul 2011	Stuttgart Open, Germany	250 Series	Clay	(Spain) Marcel Granollers	(Austria) Jürgen Melzer (Germany) Philipp Petzschner	3–6, 4–6
Loss	5–6	Mar 2012	Mexican Open, Mexico	500 Series	Clay	(Spain) Marcel Granollers	(Spain) David Marrero (Spain) Fernando Verdasco	3–6, 4–6
Win	6–6	Mar 2012	Indian Wells Masters (2), United States	Masters 1000	Hard	(Spain) Rafael Nadal	(United States) John Isner (United States) Sam Querrey	6–2, 7–6^{(7–3)}
Loss	6–7	Apr 2012	Barcelona Open, Spain	500 Series	Clay	(Spain) Marcel Granollers	(Poland) Mariusz Fyrstenberg (Poland) Marcin Matkowski	6–2, 6–7^{(7–9)}, [8–10]
Win	7–7	May 2012	Italian Open, Italy	Masters 1000	Clay	(Spain) Marcel Granollers	(Poland) Łukasz Kubot (Serbia) Janko Tipsarević	6–3, 6–2
Loss	7–8	Jul 2012	Croatia Open, Croatia	250 Series	Clay	(Spain) Marcel Granollers	(Spain) David Marrero (Spain) Fernando Verdasco	3–6, 6–7^{(4–7)}
Win	8–8	Jul 2012	Swiss Open, Switzerland	250 Series	Clay	(Spain) Marcel Granollers	(Colombia) Robert Farah (Colombia) Santiago Giraldo	6–4, 7–6^{(11–9)}
Loss	8–9	Aug 2012	Canadian Open, Canada	Masters 1000	Hard	(Spain) Marcel Granollers	(United States) Bob Bryan (United States) Mike Bryan	1–6, 6–4, [10–12]
Win	9–9	Nov 2012	ATP World Tour Finals, United Kingdom	Tour Finals	Hard (i)	(Spain) Marcel Granollers	(India) Mahesh Bhupathi (India) Rohan Bopanna	7–5, 3–6, [10–3]
Loss	9–10	Aug 2013	Cincinnati Masters, United States	Masters 1000	Hard	(Spain) Marcel Granollers	(United States) Bob Bryan (United States) Mike Bryan	4–6, 6–4, [4–10]
Win	10–10	Feb 2014	Argentina Open, Argentina	250 Series	Clay	(Spain) Marcel Granollers	(Uruguay) Pablo Cuevas (Argentina) Horacio Zeballos	7–5, 6–4
Loss	10–11	Jun 2014	French Open, France	Grand Slam	Clay	(Spain) Marcel Granollers	(France) Julien Benneteau (France) Édouard Roger-Vasselin	3–6, 6–7^{(1–7)}
Loss	10–12	Sep 2014	US Open, United States	Grand Slam	Hard	(Spain) Marcel Granollers	(United States) Bob Bryan (United States) Mike Bryan	3–6, 4–6
Loss	10–13	May 2015	Estoril Open, Portugal	250 Series	Clay	(Spain) David Marrero	(Philippines) Treat Huey (United States) Scott Lipsky	1–6, 4–6
Loss	10–14	May 2015	Italian Open, Italy	Masters 1000	Clay	(Spain) Marcel Granollers	(Uruguay) Pablo Cuevas (Spain) David Marrero	4–6, 5–7
Win	11–14	Jan 2016	Qatar Open (3), Qatar	250 Series	Hard	(Spain) Feliciano López	(Germany) Philipp Petzschner (Austria) Alexander Peya	6–4, 6–3
Loss	11–15	Feb 2016	Dubai Tennis Championships, United Arab Emirates	500 Series	Hard	(Spain) Feliciano López	(Italy) Simone Bolelli (Italy) Andreas Seppi	2–6, 6–3, [12–14]
Win	12–15	Jun 2016	French Open, France	Grand Slam	Clay	(Spain) Feliciano López	(United States) Bob Bryan (United States) Mike Bryan	6–4, 6–7^{(6–8)}, 6–3
Win	13–15	Aug 2016	Olympic Games, Brazil	Olympics	Hard	(Spain) Rafael Nadal	(Romania) Florin Mergea (Romania) Horia Tecău	6–2, 3–6, 6–4
Loss	13–16	Apr 2017	Grand Prix Hassan II, Morocco	250 Series	Clay	(Spain) Marcel Granollers	(United Kingdom) Dominic Inglot (Croatia) Mate Pavić	4–6, 6–2, [9–11]
Loss	13–17	Apr 2017	Monte-Carlo Masters, Monaco	Masters 1000	Clay	(Spain) Feliciano López	(India) Rohan Bopanna (Uruguay) Pablo Cuevas	3–6, 6–3, [4–10]
Loss	13–18	Jul 2017	German Open, Germany	500 Series	Clay	(Uruguay) Pablo Cuevas	(Croatia) Ivan Dodig (Croatia) Mate Pavić	3–6, 4–6
Loss	13–19	Sep 2017	US Open, United States	Grand Slam	Hard	(Spain) Feliciano López	(Netherlands) Jean-Julien Rojer (Romania) Horia Tecău	3–6, 4–6
Win	14–19	Apr 2018	Barcelona Open, Spain	500 Series	Clay	(Spain) Feliciano López	(Pakistan) Aisam-ul-Haq Qureshi (Netherlands) Jean-Julien Rojer	7–6^{(7–5)}, 6–4

== Performance timelines ==
Key
W	F	SF	QF	#R	RR	Q#	P#	DNQ	A	Z#	PO	G	S	B	NMS	NTI	P	NH

(W) winner; (F) finalist; (SF) semifinalist; (QF) quarterfinalist; (#R) rounds 4, 3, 2, 1; (RR) round-robin stage; (Q#) qualification round; (P#) preliminary round; (DNQ) did not qualify; (A) absent; (Z#) Davis/Fed Cup Zonal Group (with number indication) or (PO) play-off; (G) gold, (S) silver or (B) bronze Olympic/Paralympic medal; (NMS) not a Masters tournament; (NTI) not a Tier I tournament; (P) postponed; (NH) not held; (SR) strike rate (events won / competed); (W–L) win–loss record.
To avoid confusion and double counting, these charts are updated at the conclusion of a tournament or when the player's participation has ended.

=== Singles ===
Tournament	2003	2004	2005	2006	2007	2008	2009	2010	SR	W–L
Grand Slam tournaments
Australian Open	A	A	Q2	A	Q2	A	Q3	Q1	0 / 0	0–0
French Open	2R	1R	Q3	A	Q3	1R	Q1	A	0 / 3	1–3
Wimbledon	A	1R	A	A	Q3	Q1	Q1	A	0 / 1	0–1
US Open	Absent								0 / 0	0–0
Win–loss	1–1	0–2	0–0	0–0	0–0	0–1	0–0	0–0	0 / 4	1–4

=== Doubles ===
Current through the 2022 Mutua Madrid Open.

Tournament	2009	2010	2011	2012	2013	2014	2015	2016	2017	2018	2019	2020	2021	2022	SR	W–L	Win%
Grand Slam tournaments
Australian Open	A	1R	1R	2R	SF	2R	1R	2R	3R	2R	1R	1R	1R	A	0 / 12	10–12	45%
French Open	QF	QF	2R	A	QF	F	1R	W	1R	SF	1R	A	1R	A	1 / 11	25–10	71%
Wimbledon	1R	2R	2R	1R	1R	3R	2R	1R	1R	1R	A	NH	1R	A	0 / 11	5–11	33%
US Open	A	1R	3R	SF	3R	F	3R	SF	F	2R	A	A	A	A	0 / 9	25–8	76%
Win–loss	3–2	4–4	4–3	5–3	9–4	13–4	3–4	11–3	7–4	6–4	0–2	0–1	0–3	0–0	1 / 43	65–41	61%
ATP World Tour Finals
ATP Finals	Did not qualify			W	RR	RR	DNQ	RR	Did not qualify						1 / 4	7–6	54%
ATP World Tour Masters 1000
Indian Wells	2R	W	SF	W	2R	A	2R	SF	1R	QF	A	NH	A	A	2 / 9	21–7	75%
Miami	2R	2R	2R	2R	SF	1R	1R	2R	1R	1R	1R	NH	A	A	0 / 11	8–11	42%
Monte Carlo	A	QF	1R	SF	2R	1R	QF	1R	F	1R	1R	NH	A	A	0 / 10	9–10	47%
Madrid	2R	QF	2R	QF	2R	2R	SF	1R	SF	1R	1R	NH	1R	2R	0 / 13	12–13	48%
Rome	A	A	1R	W	QF	A	F	1R	2R	QF	2R	A	A	A	1 / 8	10–7	59%
Canada	A	A	1R	F	QF	QF	A	A	1R	2R	A	NH	A	A	0 / 6	6–6	50%
Cincinnati	A	A	2R	QF	F	2R	A	1R	2R	QF	A	A	A	A	0 / 7	8–7	53%
Shanghai	A	2R	1R	A	QF	SF	A	QF	2R	A	A	NH		A	0 / 6	5–6	45%
Paris	A	A	A	A	QF	SF	A	QF	QF	1R	A	A	A	A	0 / 5	6–5	55%
Win–loss	3–3	11–4	6–8	20–5	11–9	6–7	7–5	6–8	5–5	5–8	1–4	0–0	0–1	1–1	3 / 75	85–72	54%
Career Statistics
	2009	2010	2011	2012	2013	2014	2015	2016	2017	2018	2019	2020	2021	2022	Career		
Titles–Finals	1–1	3–4	1–4	4–8	0–1	1–3	0–2	3–4	0–4	1–1	0–0	0–0	0–0	0–0	14–33		
Win–loss	13–10	37–20	33–27	48–20	32–23	19–12	20–18	36–22	24–27	20–26	4–11	0–3	1–12	2–1	311–245		
Year-end ranking	62	15	37	6	11	9	32	10	20	31	191	327	532		55.94%		

== Personal life ==
He married his girlfriend María S. in November 2015, after a four-year relationship. The couple separated in 2017.

In August 2021, López welcomed his first child with María García-Planas Albert, a former college tennis player at the Loyola Marymount University.
