= Rohan Bopanna career statistics =

Career finals
Discipline	Type	Won	Lost	Total	WR
Doubles
Doubles	Grand Slam	1	2	3	0.33
Doubles	ATP Finals	–	2	2	0.00
Doubles	ATP 1000	6	8	14	0.43
Doubles	ATP 500	5	5	10	0.50
Doubles	ATP 250	14	21	35	0.40
Doubles	Olympics	–	–	0	–
Doubles	Total	26	38	64	0.41
Mixed Doubles
Mixed Doubles	Grand Slam	1	2	3	0.33
Mixed Doubles	Total	1	2	3	0.33

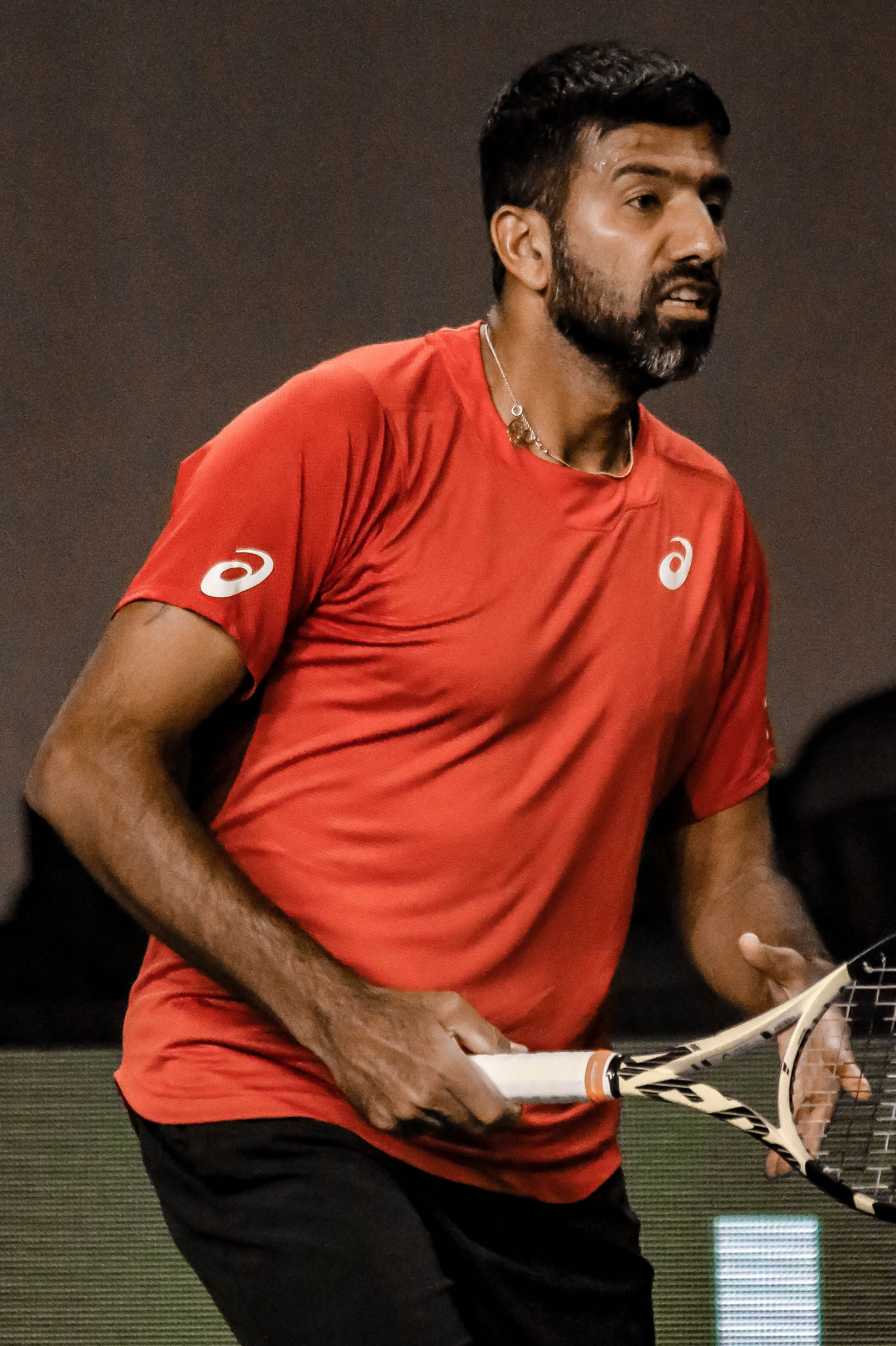
Rohan Bopanna

Rohan Bopanna is an Indian tennis player who played professionally from 2003 to 2025. His main career statistics are given below.

== Performance timeline ==
Key
W	F	SF	QF	#R	RR	Q#	P#	DNQ	A	Z#	PO	G	S	B	NMS	NTI	P	NH

(W) winner; (F) finalist; (SF) semifinalist; (QF) quarterfinalist; (#R) rounds 4, 3, 2, 1; (RR) round-robin stage; (Q#) qualification round; (P#) preliminary round; (DNQ) did not qualify; (A) absent; (Z#) Davis/Fed Cup Zonal Group (with number indication) or (PO) play-off; (G) gold, (S) silver or (B) bronze Olympic/Paralympic medal; (NMS) not a Masters tournament; (NTI) not a Tier I tournament; (P) postponed; (NH) not held; (SR) strike rate (events won / competed); (W–L) win–loss record.
To avoid confusion and double counting, these charts are updated at the conclusion of a tournament or when the player's participation has ended.

=== Men's doubles ===
Tournament	2006	2007	2008	2009	2010	2011	2012	2013	2014	2015	2016	2017	2018	2019	2020	2021	2022	2023	2024	2025	SR	W–L	Win %
Grand Slam
Australian Open	A	A	3R	2R	1R	3R	3R	2R	3R	2R	3R	2R	3R	1R	1R	1R	1R	1R	W	1R	1 / 18	22–17	56%
French Open	A	A	1R	1R	2R	QF	1R	1R	2R	3R	QF	3R	QF	3R	1R	QF	SF	1R	SF	3R	0 / 18	28–18	61%
Wimbledon	Q1	Q1	2R	A	QF	1R	2R	SF	2R	SF	3R	2R	2R	1R	NH	1R	A	SF	2R	1R	0 / 15	23–15	61%
US Open	A	A	1R	A	F	SF	1R	3R	1R	QF	2R	2R	QF	3R	QF	3R	1R	F	3R	1R	0 / 17	31–17	65%
Win–loss	0–0	0–0	3–4	1–2	9–4	9–4	3–4	7–4	4–4	10–4	8–4	5–4	9–4	3–4	2–3	4–4	4–3	9–4	12–3	2–4	1 / 68	104–67	61%
Year-end championship
ATP Finals	Did not qualify					RR	F	DNQ		F	Did not qualify							SF	RR	DNQ	0 / 5	9–10	47%
National Representation
Olympics	Not Held		A	Not Held			2R	Not Held			1R	Not Held				A	Not Held		1R	NH	0 / 3	1–3	25%
Davis Cup	Z1	Z1	PO	PO	1R	1R	Z1	A	PO	PO	PO	PO	PO	QR	QR		WG1	WG1	A	A	0 / 2	13–10	57%
ATP Masters 1000
Indian Wells	A	A	A	A	A	SF	1R	1R	1R	2R	1R	1R	1R	2R	NH	QF	2R	W	1R	1R	1 / 14	12–13	48%
Miami	A	A	A	A	A	QF	SF	2R	2R	1R	1R	1R	2R	QF	NH	1R	QF	1R	W	1R	1 / 14	17–13	57%
Monte Carlo	A	A	A	A	A	SF	2R	2R	QF	1R	QF	W	SF	1R	NH	A	SF	2R	2R	QF	1 / 13	19–12	61%
Madrid (Clay)	as Hamburg			A	A	QF	SF	QF	QF	W	F	1R	2R	1R	NH	QF	1R	F	1R	2R	1 / 14	19–13	59%
Rome	A	A	A	A	A	A	SF	F	2R	2R	SF	QF	2R	1R	QF	1R	2R	2R	2R	2R	0 / 14	16–14	53%
Canada	A	A	A	A	1R	QF	2R	1R	2R	2R	2R	F	A	SF	NH	QF	2R	QF	2R	A	0 / 13	11–13	46%
Cincinnati	A	A	1R	A	2R	QF	F	SF	1R	QF	1R	QF	A	2R	1R	1R	1R	2R	2R	1R	0 / 16	9–16	36%
Shanghai	Not Held			A	QF	2R	F	2R	SF	SF	2R	1R	1R	2R	NH			F	2R	1R	0 / 13	16–13	55%
Paris	A	A	A	A	2R	W	W	QF	QF	QF	SF	1R	2R	QF	QF	A	QF	F	QF	1R	2 / 15	22–13	63%
Hamburg	A	A	A	Held as Madrid (Clay)																	0 / 0	0–0	–
Madrid (Hard)	A	A	A	Held as Shanghai																	0 / 0	0–0	–
Win–loss	0–0	0–0	0–1	0–0	3–4	14–7	16–8	7–9	9–9	11–8	8–9	11–8	5–7	9–9	4–3	6–6	9–8	17–8	8–8	4–8	6 / 126	141–120	54%
Career statistics	2006	2007	2008	2009	2010	2011	2012	2013	2014	2015	2016	2017	2018	2019	2020	2021	2022	2023	2024	2025	SR	W–L	Win %
Tournaments^{1} ^{+}	2	5	18	13	25	27	24	25	25	26	24	25	22	28	14	23	28	22	21	24	413		
Titles	0	0	1	0	1	3	2	2	1	4	0	3	0	1	1	0	3	2	2	0	26		
Finals	2	1	3	1	7	3	5	3	3	7	2	6	0	2	2	0	6	7	3	1	64		
Overall Win–Loss^{++}	5–2	5–5	16–17	10–12	42–24	39–27	35–25	31–23	31–24	44–25	28–25	37–23	26–23	28–26	18–12	16–24	45–25	40–22	26–22	16–24	539–410		
Win (%)	71%	50%	48%	45%	64%	59%	58%	57%	56%	64%	53%	62%	53%	52%	60%	40%	64%	65%	59%	40%	56.8%		
Year-end ranking	120	66	78	83	16	11	12	13	30	9	28	18	37	38	39	43	19	3	15	63	$7,455,122		

^{1} Including appearances in Grand Slam, ATP Tour main draw matches, and Summer Olympics.
^{+} Including 1 tournament entry 2002
^{++} Including Win-loss 2002 (0–1) and 2003 (0–1)

=== Mixed doubles ===
Tournament	2008	2009	2010	2011	2012	2013	2014	2015	2016	2017	2018	2019	2020	2021	2022	2023	2024	2025	SR	W–L	Win %
Australian Open	A	A	A	1R	QF	QF	QF	1R	QF	QF	F	1R	QF	1R	1R	F	A	QF	0 / 14	20–14	59%
French Open	A	A	A	1R	1R	1R	QF	1R	2R	W	1R	1R	NH	A	2R	A	1R	A	1 / 11	8–10	44%
Wimbledon	2R	A	1R	QF	QF	QF	3R	2R	3R	QF	A	2R	NH	3R	A	1R	A	A	0 / 12	13–12	52%
US Open	A	A	1R	1R	1R	1R	QF	SF	QF	QF	1R	2R	NH	A	1R	2R	SF	A	0 / 13	14–13	52%
Win–loss	1–1	0–0	0–2	2–4	3–4	4–4	7–4	4–4	5–4	11–4	4–3	1–4	2–1	2–2	1–3	4–3	3–2	1–1	1 / 50	55–49	53%

Note: Bopanna received walkovers in the 2nd round of the 2012 Wimbledon, the 1st round of the 2016 French Open, the Quarterfinal of 2023 Australian Open and the 2nd round of the 2025 Australian Open which do not officially count as wins.

== Grand Slam tournament finals ==
=== Doubles: 3 (1 title, 2 runner-ups) ===
Result	Year	Championship	Surface	Partner	Opponents	Score
Loss	2010	US Open	Hard	(Pakistan) Aisam-ul-Haq Qureshi	(United States) Bob Bryan (United States) Mike Bryan	6–7^{(5–7)}, 6–7^{(4–7)}
Loss	2023	US Open	Hard	(Australia) Matthew Ebden	(United States) Rajeev Ram (United Kingdom) Joe Salisbury	6–2, 3–6, 4–6
Win	2024	Australian Open	Hard	(Australia) Matthew Ebden	(Italy) Simone Bolelli (Italy) Andrea Vavassori	7–6^{(7–0)}, 7–5

=== Mixed: 3 (1 title, 2 runner-ups) ===
Result	Year	Championship	Surface	Partner	Opponents	Score
Win	2017	French Open	Clay	(Canada) Gabriela Dabrowski	(Germany) Anna-Lena Grönefeld (Colombia) Robert Farah	2–6, 6–2, [12–10]
Loss	2018	Australian Open	Hard	(Hungary) Tímea Babos	(Canada) Gabriela Dabrowski (Croatia) Mate Pavić	6–2, 4–6, [9–11]
Loss	2023	Australian Open	Hard	(India) Sania Mirza	(Brazil) Luisa Stefani (Brazil) Rafael Matos	6–7^{(2–7)}, 2–6

== Other significant finals ==
=== Year-end championships finals ===
==== Doubles: 2 (2 runner-ups) ====
Result	Year	Championship	Surface	Partner	Opponents	Score
Loss	2012	London	Hard (i)	(India) Mahesh Bhupathi	(Spain) Marcel Granollers (Spain) Marc López	5–7, 6–3, [3–10]
Loss	2015	London	Hard (i)	(Romania) Florin Mergea	(Netherlands) Jean-Julien Rojer (Romania) Horia Tecău	4–6, 3–6

=== Masters 1000 finals ===
==== Doubles: 14 (6 titles, 8 runner-ups) ====
Result	Year	Championship	Surface	Partner	Opponents	Score
Win	2011	Paris	Hard (i)	(Pakistan) Aisam-ul-Haq Qureshi	(France) Julien Benneteau (France) Nicolas Mahut	6–2, 6–4
Loss	2012	Cincinnati	Hard	(India) Mahesh Bhupathi	(Sweden) Robert Lindstedt (Romania) Horia Tecău	5–7, 3–6
Loss	2012	Shanghai	Hard	(India) Mahesh Bhupathi	(India) Leander Paes (Czech Republic) Radek Štěpánek	7–6^{(9–7)}, 3–6, [5–10]
Win	2012	Paris	Hard (i)	(India) Mahesh Bhupathi	(Pakistan) Aisam-ul-Haq Qureshi (Netherlands) Jean-Julien Rojer	7–6^{(8–6)}, 6–3
Loss	2013	Rome	Clay	(India) Mahesh Bhupathi	(United States) Bob Bryan (United States) Mike Bryan	2–6, 3–6
Win	2015	Madrid	Clay	(Romania) Florin Mergea	(Poland) Marcin Matkowski (Serbia) Nenad Zimonjić	6–2, 6–7^{(5–7)}, [11–9]
Loss	2016	Madrid	Clay	(Romania) Florin Mergea	(Netherlands) Jean-Julien Rojer (Romania) Horia Tecău	4–6, 6–7^{(5–7)}
Win	2017	Monte Carlo	Clay	(Uruguay) Pablo Cuevas	(Spain) Feliciano López (Spain) Marc López	6–3, 3–6, [10–4]
Loss	2017	Montreal	Hard	(Croatia) Ivan Dodig	(France) Pierre-Hugues Herbert (France) Nicolas Mahut	4-6, 6–3, [6-10]
Win	2023	Indian Wells	Hard	(Australia) Matthew Ebden	(Netherlands) Wesley Koolhof (United Kingdom) Neal Skupski	6–3, 2–6, [10–8]
Loss	2023	Madrid	Clay	(Australia) Matthew Ebden	Karen Khachanov; Andrey Rublev	3–6, 6–3, [3–10]
Loss	2023	Shanghai	Hard	(Australia) Matthew Ebden	(Spain) Marcel Granollers (Argentina) Horacio Zeballos	7–5, 2–6, [7–10]
Loss	2023	Paris	Hard (i)	(Australia) Matthew Ebden	(Mexico) Santiago González (France) Édouard Roger-Vasselin	2–6, 7–5, [7–10]
Win	2024	Miami	Hard	(Australia) Matthew Ebden	(Croatia) Ivan Dodig (United States) Austin Krajicek	6–7^{(3–7)}, 6–3, [10–6]

=== Olympic finals ===
==== Mixed doubles: 1 runner-up ====
Result	Year	Championship	Surface	Partner	Opponents	Score
4th place	2016	Rio de Janeiro	Hard	(India) Sania Mirza	(Czech Republic) Lucie Hradecká (Czech Republic) Radek Štěpánek	1–6, 5–7

== ATP career finals ==
=== Doubles: 64 (26 titles, 38 runner-ups) ===
Legend Grand Slam tournaments (1–2) ATP World Tour Finals (0–2) ATP World Tour Masters 1000 (6–8) ATP World Tour 500 Series (5–3) ATP World Tour 250 Series (14–21)	Finals by surface Hard (22–25) Clay (2–8) Grass (2–4)	Finals by setting Outdoor (20–28) Indoor (6–9)

Result	W–L	Date	Tournament	Tier	Surface	Partner	Opponents	Score
Loss	0–1	Jan 2006	Chennai Open, India	International	Hard	(India) Prakash Amritraj	(Slovakia) Michal Mertiňák (Czech Republic) Petr Pála	2–6, 5–7
Loss	0–2	Oct 2006	Mumbai Open, India	International	Hard	(India) Mustafa Ghouse	(Croatia) Mario Ančić (India) Mahesh Bhupathi	4–6, 7–6^{(8–6)}, [8–10]
Loss	0–3	Sep 2007	Mumbai Open, India	International	Hard	(Pakistan) Aisam-ul-Haq Qureshi	(Sweden) Robert Lindstedt (Finland) Jarkko Nieminen	6–7^{(3–7)}, 6–7^{(5–7)}
Loss	0–4	Jul 2008	Hall of Fame Tennis Championships, United States	International	Grass	(Pakistan) Aisam-ul-Haq Qureshi	(United States) Mardy Fish (United States) John Isner	4–6, 6–7^{(1–7)}
Win	1–4	Aug 2008	Los Angeles Open, United States	International	Hard	(United States) Eric Butorac	(United States) Travis Parrott (Serbia) Dušan Vemić	7–6^{(7–5)}, 7–6^{(7–5)}
Loss	1–5	Oct 2008	St. Petersburg Open, Russia	International	Hard (i)	(Belarus) Max Mirnyi	(United States) Travis Parrott (Slovakia) Filip Polášek	6–3, 6–7^{(4–7)}, [8–10]
Loss	1–6	Feb 2009	Pacific Coast Championships, United States	250 Series	Hard (i)	(Finland) Jarkko Nieminen	(Germany) Tommy Haas (Czech Republic) Radek Štěpánek	2–6, 3–6
Win	2–6	Feb 2010	SA Tennis Open, South Africa	250 Series	Hard	(Pakistan) Aisam-ul-Haq Qureshi	(Slovakia) Karol Beck (Israel) Harel Levy	2–6, 6–3, [10–5]
Loss	2–7	Apr 2010	Grand Prix Hassan II, Morocco	250 Series	Clay	(Pakistan) Aisam-ul-Haq Qureshi	(Sweden) Robert Lindstedt (Romania) Horia Tecău	2–6, 6–3, [7–10]
Loss	2–8	May 2010	Open de Nice Côte d'Azur, France	250 Series	Clay	(Pakistan) Aisam-ul-Haq Qureshi	(Brazil) Marcelo Melo (Brazil) Bruno Soares	6–1, 3–6, [5–10]
Loss	2–9	Jul 2010	Atlanta Open, United States	250 Series	Hard	(Belgium) Kristof Vliegen	(United States) Scott Lipsky (United States) Rajeev Ram	3–6, 7–6^{(7–4)}, [10–12]
Loss	2–10	Aug 2010	New Haven Open, United States	250 Series	Hard	(Pakistan) Aisam-ul-Haq Qureshi	(Sweden) Robert Lindstedt (Romania) Horia Tecău	4–6, 5–7
Loss	2–11	Sep 2010	US Open, New York	Grand Slam	Hard	(Pakistan) Aisam-ul-Haq Qureshi	(United States) Mike Bryan (United States) Bob Bryan	6–7^{(5–7)}, 6–7^{(4–7)}
Loss	2–12	Sep 2010	St. Petersburg Open, Russia	250 Series	Hard (i)	(Pakistan) Aisam-ul-Haq Qureshi	(Italy) Daniele Bracciali (Italy) Potito Starace	6–7^{(6–8)}, 6–7^{(5–7)}
Win	3–12	Jun 2011	Halle Open, Germany	250 Series	Grass	(Pakistan) Aisam-ul-Haq Qureshi	(Netherlands) Robin Haase (Canada) Milos Raonic	7–6^{(10–8)}, 3–6, [11–9]
Win	4–12	Oct 2011	Stockholm Open, Sweden	250 Series	Hard (i)	(Pakistan) Aisam-ul-Haq Qureshi	(Brazil) Marcelo Melo (Brazil) Bruno Soares	6–1, 6–3
Win	5–12	Nov 2011	Paris Masters, France	Masters 1000	Hard (i)	(Pakistan) Aisam-ul-Haq Qureshi	(France) Julien Benneteau (France) Nicolas Mahut	6–2, 6–4
Win	6–12	Mar 2012	Dubai Tennis Championships, UAE	500 Series	Hard	(India) Mahesh Bhupathi	(Poland) Mariusz Fyrstenberg (Poland) Marcin Matkowski	6–4, 3–6, [10–5]
Loss	6–13	Aug 2012	Cincinnati Masters, United States	Masters 1000	Hard	(India) Mahesh Bhupathi	(Sweden) Robert Lindstedt (Romania) Horia Tecău	4–6, 4–6
Loss	6–14	Oct 2012	Shanghai Masters, China	Masters 1000	Hard	(India) Mahesh Bhupathi	(India) Leander Paes (Czech Republic) Radek Štěpánek	7–6^{(9–7)}, 3–6, [5–10]
Win	7–14	Nov 2012	Paris Masters, France (2)	Masters 1000	Hard (i)	(India) Mahesh Bhupathi	(Pakistan) Aisam-ul-Haq Qureshi (Netherlands) Jean-Julien Rojer	7–6^{(8–6)}, 6–3
Loss	7–15	Nov 2012	World Tour Finals, London	Tour Finals	Hard (i)	(India) Mahesh Bhupathi	(Spain) Marcel Granollers (Spain) Marc López	5–7, 6–3, [3–10]
Win	8–15	Feb 2013	Open 13, France	250 Series	Hard (i)	(United Kingdom) Colin Fleming	(Pakistan) Aisam-ul-Haq Qureshi (Netherlands) Jean-Julien Rojer	6–4, 7–6^{(7–3)}
Loss	8–16	May 2013	Rome Masters, Italy	Masters 1000	Clay	(India) Mahesh Bhupathi	(United States) Bob Bryan (United States) Mike Bryan	2–6, 3–6
Win	9–16	Oct 2013	Rakuten Open Championships, Japan	500 Series	Hard	(France) Édouard Roger-Vasselin	(United Kingdom) Jamie Murray (Australia) John Peers	7–6^{(7–5)}, 6–4
Loss	9–17	Jan 2014	Sydney International, Australia	250 Series	Hard	(Pakistan) Aisam-ul-Haq Qureshi	(Canada) Daniel Nestor (Serbia) Nenad Zimonjić	6–7^{(3–7)}, 6–7^{(3–7)}
Win	10–17	Mar 2014	Dubai Tennis Championships, UAE (2)	500 Series	Hard	(Pakistan) Aisam-ul-Haq Qureshi	(Canada) Daniel Nestor (Serbia) Nenad Zimonjić	6–4, 6–3
Loss	10–18	May 2014	Open de Nice Côte d'Azur, France	250 Series	Clay	(Pakistan) Aisam-ul-Haq Qureshi	(Slovakia) Martin Kližan (Austria) Philipp Oswald	2–6, 0–6
Win	11–18	Jan 2015	Sydney International, Australia	250 Series	Hard	(Canada) Daniel Nestor	(Netherlands) Jean-Julien Rojer (Romania) Horia Tecău	6–4, 7–6^{(7–5)}
Win	12–18	Feb 2015	Dubai Tennis Championships, UAE (3)	500 Series	Hard	(Canada) Daniel Nestor	(Pakistan) Aisam-ul-Haq Qureshi (Serbia) Nenad Zimonjić	6–4, 6–1
Loss	12–19	Apr 2015	Grand Prix Hassan II, Morocco	250 Series	Clay	(Romania) Florin Mergea	(Australia) Rameez Junaid (Canada) Adil Shamasdin	6–3, 2–6, [7–10]
Win	13–19	May 2015	Madrid Open, Spain	Masters 1000	Clay	(Romania) Florin Mergea	(Poland) Marcin Matkowski (Serbia) Nenad Zimonjić	6–2, 6–7^{(5–7)}, [11–9]
Win	14–19	Jun 2015	Stuttgart Open, Germany	250 Series	Grass	(Romania) Florin Mergea	(Austria) Alexander Peya (Brazil) Bruno Soares	5–7, 6–2, [10–7]
Loss	14–20	Jun 2015	Halle Open, Germany	500 Series	Grass	(Romania) Florin Mergea	(South Africa) Raven Klaasen (United States) Rajeev Ram	6–7^{(5–7)}, 2–6
Loss	14–21	Nov 2015	World Tour Finals, London	Tour Finals	Hard (i)	(Romania) Florin Mergea	(Netherlands) Jean-Julien Rojer (Romania) Horia Tecău	4–6, 3–6
Loss	14–22	Jan 2016	Sydney International, Australia	250 Series	Hard	(Romania) Florin Mergea	(United Kingdom) Jamie Murray (Brazil) Bruno Soares	3–6, 6–7^{(6–8)}
Loss	14–23	May 2016	Madrid Open, Spain	Masters 1000	Clay	(Romania) Florin Mergea	(Netherlands) Jean-Julien Rojer (Romania) Horia Tecău	4–6, 6–7^{(5–7)}
Win	15–23	Jan 2017	Chennai Open, India	250 Series	Hard	(India) Jeevan Nedunchezhiyan	(India) Purav Raja (India) Divij Sharan	6–3, 6–4
Loss	15–24	Mar 2017	Dubai Tennis Championships, UAE	500 Series	Hard	(Poland) Marcin Matkowski	(Netherlands) Jean-Julien Rojer (Romania) Horia Tecău	6–4, 3–6, [3–10]
Win	16–24	Apr 2017	Monte-Carlo Masters, Monaco	Masters 1000	Clay	(Uruguay) Pablo Cuevas	(Spain) Feliciano López (Spain) Marc López	6–3, 3–6, [10–4]
Loss	16–25	Jun 2017	Eastbourne International, United Kingdom	250 Series	Grass	(Brazil) André Sá	(United States) Bob Bryan (United States) Mike Bryan	7–6^{(7–4)}, 4–6, [3–10]
Loss	16–26	Aug 2017	Rogers Cup, Canada	Masters 1000	Hard	(Croatia) Ivan Dodig	(France) Pierre-Hugues Herbert (France) Nicolas Mahut	4–6, 6–3, [6–10]
Win	17–26	Oct 2017	Vienna Open, Austria	500 Series	Hard (i)	(Uruguay) Pablo Cuevas	(Brazil) Marcelo Demoliner (United States) Sam Querrey	7–6^{(9–7)}, 6–7^{(4–7)}, [11–9]
Win	18–26	Jan 2019	Maharashtra Open, India	250 Series	Hard	(India) Divij Sharan	(United Kingdom) Luke Bambridge (United Kingdom) Jonny O'Mara	6–3, 6–4
Loss	18–27	Jun 2019	Stuttgart Open, Germany	250 Series	Grass	(Canada) Denis Shapovalov	(Australia) John Peers (Brazil) Bruno Soares	5–7, 3–6
Win	19–27	Jan 2020	Qatar Open, Qatar	250 Series	Hard	(Netherlands) Wesley Koolhof	(United Kingdom) Luke Bambridge (Mexico) Santiago González	3–6, 6–2, [10–6]
Loss	19–28	Oct 2020	European Open, Belgium	250 Series	Hard (i)	(Netherlands) Matwé Middelkoop	(Australia) John Peers (New Zealand) Michael Venus	3–6, 4–6
Win	20–28	Jan 2022	Adelaide International, Australia	250 Series	Hard	(India) Ramkumar Ramanathan	(Croatia) Ivan Dodig (Brazil) Marcelo Melo	7–6^{(8–6)}, 6–1
Win	21–28	Jan 2022	Maharashtra Open, India	250 Series	Hard	(India) Ramkumar Ramanathan	(Australia) Luke Saville (Australia) John-Patrick Smith	6–7^{(10–12)}, 6–3, [10–6]
Loss	21–29	Feb 2022	Qatar Open, Qatar	250 Series	Hard	(Canada) Denis Shapovalov	(Netherlands) Wesley Koolhof (United Kingdom) Neal Skupski	6–7^{(4–7)}, 1–6
Loss	21–30	Jul 2022	Hamburg European Open, Germany	500 Series	Clay	(Netherlands) Matwé Middelkoop	(United Kingdom) Lloyd Glasspool (Finland) Harri Heliövaara	2–6, 4–6
Win	22–30	Oct 2022	Tel Aviv Open, Israel	250 Series	Hard (i)	(Netherlands) Matwé Middelkoop	(Mexico) Santiago González (Argentina) Andrés Molteni	6–2, 6–4
Loss	22–31	Oct 2022	European Open, Belgium	250 Series	Hard (i)	(Netherlands) Matwé Middelkoop	(Netherlands) Tallon Griekspoor (Netherlands) Botic van de Zandschulp	6–3, 3–6, [5–10]
Loss	22–32	Feb 2023	Rotterdam Open, Netherlands	500 Series	Hard (i)	(Australia) Matthew Ebden	(Croatia) Ivan Dodig (United States) Austin Krajicek	6–7^{(5–7)}, 6–2, [10–12]
Win	23–32	Feb 2023	Qatar Open, Qatar (2)	250 Series	Hard	(Australia) Matthew Ebden	(France) Constant Lestienne (Netherlands) Botic van de Zandschulp	6–7^{(5–7)}, 6–4, [10–6]
Win	24–32	Mar 2023	Indian Wells Masters, United States	Masters 1000	Hard	(Australia) Matthew Ebden	(Netherlands) Wesley Koolhof (United Kingdom) Neal Skupski	6–3, 2–6, [10–8]
Loss	24–33	May 2023	Madrid Open, Spain	Masters 1000	Clay	(Australia) Matthew Ebden	Karen Khachanov; Andrey Rublev	3–6, 6–3, [3–10]
Loss	24–34	Sep 2023	US Open, New York	Grand Slam	Hard	(Australia) Matthew Ebden	(United States) Rajeev Ram (United Kingdom) Joe Salisbury	6–2, 3–6, 4–6
Loss	24–35	Oct 2023	Shanghai Masters, China	Masters 1000	Hard	(Australia) Matthew Ebden	(Spain) Marcel Granollers (Argentina) Horacio Zeballos	7–5, 2–6, [7–10]
Loss	24–36	Oct 2023	Paris Masters, France	Masters 1000	Hard (i)	(Australia) Matthew Ebden	(Mexico) Santiago González (France) Édouard Roger-Vasselin	2–6, 7–5, [7–10]
Loss	24–37	Jan 2024	Adelaide International, Australia	250 Series	Hard	(Australia) Matthew Ebden	(United States) Rajeev Ram (United Kingdom) Joe Salisbury	5–7, 7–5, [9–11]
Win	25–37	Jan 2024	Australian Open, Melbourne	Grand Slam	Hard	(Australia) Matthew Ebden	(Italy) Simone Bolelli (Italy) Andrea Vavassori	7–6^{(7–0)}, 7–5
Win	26–37	Mar 2024	Miami Open, United States	Masters 1000	Hard	(Australia) Matthew Ebden	(Croatia) Ivan Dodig (United States) Austin Krajicek	6–7^{(3–7)}, 6–3, [10–6]
Loss	26–38	Sep 2025	Japan Open, Japan	500 Series	Hard	(Japan) Takeru Yuzuki	(Monaco) Hugo Nys (France) Édouard Roger-Vasselin	5–7, 5–7

== Other Finals ==
=== Asian Games ===
==== Men's doubles 1 (1 title) ====
Result	Date	Tournament	Surface	Partner	Opponent	Score
Gold	2018	Palembang, Indonesia	Hard	Divij Sharan (IND)	Alexander Bublik (KAZ); Denis Yevseyev (KAZ)	6–3, 6–4

==== Mixed doubles 1 (1 title) ====
Result	Date	Tournament	Surface	Partner	Opponent	Score
Gold	2022	Hangzhou, China	Hard	Rutuja Bhosale (IND)	Liang En-shuo (TPE); Huang Tsung-hao (TPE)	2–6, 6–3, [10–4]

== Challengers and Futures finals ==
=== Singles: 16 (6 titles, 10 runner ups) ===
Legend (singles) ATP Challenger Tour (1–1) ITF Futures Tour (5–9)	Titles by surface Hard (5–7) Clay (0–2) Grass (0–0) Carpet (1–1)

Result	W–L	Date	Tournament	Tier	Surface	Opponents	Score
Loss	0–1	Oct 2001	India F4, Bombay	Futures	Hard	(India) Srinath Prahlad	3–6, 4–6
Loss	0–2	Oct 2001	India F5, Indore	Futures	Clay	(India) Srinath Prahlad	6–7^{(4–7)}, 6–7^{(2–7)}
Win	1–2	Mar 2002	India F2, New Delhi	Futures	Hard	(Ukraine) Dimitri Mazur	7–6^{(7–5)}, 5–7, 6–4
Win	2–2	Sep 2002	India F5, Chennai	Futures	Hard	(India) Harsh Mankad	7–6^{(7–5)}, 4–6, 6–4
Loss	2–3	Jan 2003	India F2, New Delhi	Futures	Carpet	(Russia) Dmitri Vlasov	4–6, 1–6
Loss	2–4	Mar 2003	India F4, Mumbai	Futures	Hard	(Austria) Zbynek Mlynarik	6–7^{(4–7)}, 6–7^{(5–7)}
Win	3–4	Aug 2003	Indonesia F4, Jakarta	Futures	Hard	(Indonesia) Febi Widhiyanto	7–5, 2–6, 6–2
Loss	3–5	Apr 2005	Sri Lanka F1, Colombo	Futures	Clay	(Germany) Peter Mayer Tischer	6–7^{(4–7)}, 2–6
Win	4–5	May 2005	Kuwait F2, Mishref	Futures	Hard	(Slovakia) Viktor Bruthans	7–6^{(7–4)}, 6–4
Win	5–5	Jun 2005	India F1 (1), Gurgaon	Futures	Hard	(Indonesia) Prima Simpatiaji	6–3, 6–2
Loss	5–6	Jun 2005	India F1 (2), Gurgaon	Futures	Hard	(Republic of Ireland) Peter Clarke	4–6, 6–3, 4–6
Loss	5–7	Jun 2005	India F1 (3), Gurgaon	Futures	Hard	(Republic of Ireland) Peter Clarke	4–6, 5–7
Loss	5–8	Aug 2006	Bukhara, Uzbekistan	Challenger	Hard	(Serbia and Montenegro) Janko Tipsarević	2–6, 4–6
Loss	5–9	Dec 2006	India F3, Delhi	Futures	Hard	(Pakistan) Aisam-ul-Haq Qureshi	6–2, 3–6, 3–6
Win	6–9	Jul 2007	Dublin, Ireland	Challenger	Carpet	(Denmark) Martin Killemose	6–4, 6–3
Loss	6–10	Apr 2008	India F5, Chandigarh	Futures	Hard	(India) Harsh Mankad	Walkover

=== Doubles: 38 (18 titles, 20 runners ups) ===
Legend (singles) ATP Challenger Tour (11–9) ITF Futures Tour (7–11)	Titles by surface Hard (14–15) Clay (0–3) Grass (2–1) Carpet (2–1)

Result	W–L	Date	Tournament	Tier	Surface	Partner	Opponents	Score
Loss	0–1	Oct 2001	India F4, Lucknow	Futures	Hard	(India) Vijay Kannan	(India) Srinath Prahlad (India) Ajay Ramaswami	4–6, 4–6
Win	1–1	Feb 2002	United Arab Emirates F2, Dubai	Futures	Hard	(Chinese Taipei) Yen-Hsun Lu	(Slovakia) Tomas Janci (Slovakia) Roman Kukal	7–5, 7–5
Win	2–1	Mar 2002	Sri Lanka F1, Colombo	Futures	Hard	(India) Vijay Kannan	(China) Ran Xu (China) Shao-Xuan Zeng	4–6, 7–6^{(8–6)}, 6–3
Loss	2–2	Mar 2002	India F1, Jorhat	Futures	Hard	(India) Vijay Kannan	(United Kingdom) Jonathan Marray (United Kingdom) David Sherwood	6–3, 6–7^{(6–8)}, 6–7^{(8–10)}
Win	3–2	Mar 2002	India F2, New Delhi	Futures	Hard	(India) Vijay Kannan	(Thailand) Sanchai Ratiwatana (Thailand) Sonchat Ratiwatana	6–3, 6–4
Loss	3–3	Aug 2002	USA F23, Godfrey	Futures	Hard	(South Africa) Willem-Petrus Meyer	(United States) Brandon Kramer (Australia) Morgan Wilson	7–6^{(9–7)}, 5–7, 4–6
Win	4–3	Aug 2002	India F5, Chennai	Futures	Hard	(India) Vijay Kannan	(India) Nitten Kirrtane (India) Saurav Panja	6–2, 6–3
Loss	4–4	Oct 2002	India F6, Chandigarh	Futures	Hard	(India) Vijay Kannan	(India) Ajay Ramaswami (India) Sunil-Kumar Sipaeya	6–7^{(5–7)}, 2–6
Loss	4–5	Mar 2003	Ho Chi Minh City, Vietnam	Challenger	Hard	(Netherlands) Fred Hemmes Jr.	(South Africa) Rik De Voest (South Africa) Wesley Moodie	3–6, 6–3, 3–6
Win	5–5	Aug 2003	Denver, United States	Challenger	Hard	(Pakistan) Aisam-ul-Haq Qureshi	(Brazil) Josh Goffi (United States) Jason Marshall	4–6, 6–3, 6–4
Loss	5–6	Aug 2003	Indonesia F1, Jakarta	Futures	Hard	(India) Vijay Kannan	(Australia) Sadik Kadir (Austria) Martin Slanar	3–6, 6–7^{(2–7)}
Loss	5–7	Apr 2004	Qatar F2, Doha	Futures	Hard	(France) Jean-Michel Pequery	(India) Mustafa Ghouse (India) Harsh Mankad	1–6, ret.
Win	6–7	May 2004	Kuwait F1, Mishref	Futures	Hard	(India) Mustafa Ghouse	(Germany) Sebastian Fitz (Germany) Frank Moser	4–6, 6–4, 6–3
Win	7–7	Mar 2005	India F4, Chennai	Futures	Hard	(India) Vijay Kannan	(Croatia) Ivan Cerovic (Austria) Konstantin Gruber	6–4, 3–6, 7–6^{(7–5)}
Loss	7–8	Apr 2005	Sri Lanka F1, Colombo	Futures	Clay	(India) Vijay Kannan	(India) Ashutosh Singh (India) Vishal Uppal	3–6, 4–6
Loss	7–9	May 2005	India F1 (1), Gurgaon	Futures	Hard	(India) Vijay Kannan	(India) Jaco Mathew (India) Ashutosh Singh	6–4, 6–7^{(2–7)}, 4–6
Win	8–9	Jun 2005	India F1 (2), Gurgaon	Futures	Hard	(India) Vijay Kannan	(Japan) Hayato Furukawa (Japan) Tetsuhiro Yamamoto	4–6, 6–1, 6–2
Loss	8–10	Jun 2005	India F1 (3), Gurgaon	Futures	Hard	(India) Vijay Kannan	(India) Jaco Mathew (India) Ashutosh Singh	6–3, 3–6, 5–7
Loss	8–11	Aug 2005	Bukhara, Uzbekistan	Challenger	Hard	(South Korea) Kyu-Tae Im	(Kazakhstan) Alexey Kedryuk (Ukraine) Orest Tereshchuk	7–5, 4–6, 1–6
Loss	8–12	Nov 2005	Australia F10, Berri	Futures	Grass	(Romania) Horia Tecău	(Australia) Carsten Ball (Australia) Andrew Coelho	7–5, 3–6, [5–10]
Loss	8–13	Mar 2006	Kyoto, Japan	Challenger	Carpet	(India) Prakash Amritraj	(Australia) Alun Jones (United Kingdom) Jonathan Marray	4–6, 6–3, [12–14]
Win	9–13	Jul 2006	Aptos, United States	Challenger	Hard	(India) Prakash Amritraj	(United States) Rajeev Ram (United States) Todd Widom	3–6, 6–2, [10–6]
Loss	9–14	Aug 2006	Bukhara, Uzbekistan	Challenger	Hard	(Pakistan) Aisam-ul-Haq Qureshi	(France) Nicolas Renavand (France) Nicolas Tourte	6–2, 3–6, [8–10]
Loss	9–15	Dec 2006	India F3, Delhi	Futures	Hard	(India) Mustafa Ghouse	(Kazakhstan) Alexey Kedryuk (India) Sunil-Kumar Sipaeya	3–6, 4–6
Win	10–15	Jul 2007	Dublin, Ireland	Challenger	Carpet	(Australia) Adam Feeney	(Germany) Lars Burgsmuller (Germany) Mischa Zverev	6–2,6–2
Loss	10–16	Jul 2007	Scheveningen, Netherlands	Challenger	Clay	(Uruguay) Pablo Cuevas	(Netherlands) Raemon Sluiter (Netherlands) Peter Wessels	6–7^{(6–8)}, 5–7
Win	11–16	Jul 2007	Manchester, Great Britain	Challenger	Grass	(Pakistan) Aisam-ul-Haq Qureshi	(Netherlands) Jesse Huta Galung (Sweden) Michael Ryderstedt	4–6, 6–3, [10–5]
Win	12–16	Jul 2007	Nottingham, Great Britain	Challenger	Grass	(Pakistan) Aisam-ul-Haq Qureshi	(India) Mustafa Ghouse (United Kingdom) Josh Goodall	6–3, 7–6^{(7–5)}
Win	13–16	Aug 2007	Segovia, Spain	Challenger	Hard	(Pakistan) Aisam-ul-Haq Qureshi	(Switzerland) Michel Kratochvil (Luxembourg) Gilles Müller	7–6^{(12–10)}, 6–3
Win	14–16	Aug 2007	Bronx, USA	Challenger	Hard	(Pakistan) Aisam-ul-Haq Qureshi	(United States) Alberto Francis (United States) Phillip King	6–3, 2–6, [10–5]
Loss	14–17	Nov 2007	Dnipropetrovsk, Ukraine	Challenger	Hard	(South Africa) Chris Haggard	(Germany) Christopher Kas (Croatia) Lovro Zovko	6–7^{(5–7)}, 2–6
Loss	14–18	Nov 2007	Kuala Lumpur, Malaysia	Challenger	Hard	(Pakistan) Aisam-ul-Haq Qureshi	(Australia) Stephen Huss (South Africa) Wesley Moodie	6–7^{(10–12)}, 3–6
Loss	14–19	Dec 2007	New Delhi, India	Challenger	Hard	(Pakistan) Aisam-ul-Haq Qureshi	(South Africa) Rik de Voest (South Africa) Wesley Moodie	4–6, 6–7^{(4–7)}
Win	15–19	Mar 2009	Khorat, Thailand	Challenger	Hard	(Pakistan) Aisam-ul-Haq Qureshi	(Thailand) Sanchai Ratiwatana (Thailand) Sonchat Ratiwatana	6–3, 6–7^{(5–7)}, [10–5]
Win	16–19	Nov 2009	Aachen, Germany	Challenger	Carpet (i)	(Pakistan) Aisam-ul-Haq Qureshi	(Germany) Philipp Marx (Slovakia) Igor Zelenay	6–4, 7–6^{(8–6)}
Win	17–19	Nov 2009	Helsinki, Finland	Challenger	Hard (i)	(Pakistan) Aisam-ul-Haq Qureshi	(Finland) Henri Kontinen (Finland) Jarkko Nieminen	6–2, 7–6^{(9–7)}
Win	18–19	Mar 2010	Jersey, Channel Islands	Challenger	Hard (i)	(United Kingdom) Ken Skupski	(United Kingdom) Jonathan Marray (United Kingdom) Jamie Murray	6–2, 2–6, [10–6]
Loss	18–20	Apr 2010	Napoli, Italy	Challenger	Clay	(Pakistan) Aisam-ul-Haq Qureshi	(Jamaica) Dustin Brown (United States) Jesse Witten	6–7^{(4–7)}, 5–7

== National participation ==
=== Davis Cup (23–27) ===
Group membership World Group/Finals (1–2) WG Play-off / Qualifying round (6–12) Group I (0–0) Group II (0–0) Group III (0–0) Group IV (0–0)	Matches by surface Hard (12–18) Clay (1–2) Grass (9–5) Carpet (1–2)	Matches by type Singles (10–17) Doubles (13–10)

- ▲ ▼ indicates the Result of the Davis Cup match followed by the score, date, place of event, the zonal classification and its phase, and the court surface.

=== Hopman Cup (6–6) ===
Matches by type Singles (0–6) Mixed Doubles (6–0)

Rubber Result	Rubber	Stage	Match type (partner if any)	Opponent nation	Opponent player(s)	Score
2007 Hopman Cup; Perth Arena, Perth, Australia
Defeat	II	Group	Singles	Czech Republic	Tomáš Berdych	2–6, 2–6
Victory	III	Group	Doubles (with Sania Mirza)	Czech Republic	Lucie Šafářová / Tomáš Berdych	6–3, 5–7, 7–6^{(7–5)}
Defeat	II	Group	Singles	Croatia	Mario Ančić	6–7^{(2–7)}, 6–7^{(4–7)}
Victory	III	Group	Doubles (with Sania Mirza)	Croatia	Sanja Ančić / Mario Ančić	6–3, 3–6, 7–6^{(11–9)}
Defeat	II	Group	Singles	Spain	Tommy Robredo	2–6, 3–6
Victory	III	Group	Doubles (with Sania Mirza)	Spain	Anabel Medina Garrigues / Tommy Robredo	6–7^{(5–7)}, 6–2, 7–6^{(11–9)}
2008 Hopman Cup; Perth Arena, Perth, Australia
Defeat	II	Group	Singles	United States	Mardy Fish	2–6, 4–6
Victory	III	Group	Doubles (with Sania Mirza)	United States	Meghann Shaughnessy / Mardy Fish	6–4, 6–4
Defeat	II	Group	Singles	Australia	Peter Luczak	6–7^{(2–7)}, 3–6
Victory	III	Group	Doubles (with Sania Mirza)	Australia	Alicia Molik / Peter Luczak	6–2, 4–6, 7–6^{(14–12)}
Defeat	II	Group	Singles	Czech Republic	Tomáš Berdych	4–6, 0–6
Victory	III	Group	Doubles (with Sania Mirza)	Czech Republic	Lucie Šafářová / Tomáš Berdych	6–3, 6–2

== ATP ranking ==
=== Doubles ===
Year	1999	2000	2001	2002	2003	2004	2005	2006	2007	2008	2009	2010	2011	2012	2013	2014	2015	2016	2017	2018	2019	2020	2021	2022	2023	2024	2025
High	722T	662	515	309	203	210	277	107	66	43	61	13	9	8	3	13	9	8	14	18	32	36	37	17	3	1	15
Low	1066T	865	864	546	376	676	734	277	173	81	100	88	19	15	13	35	30	28	28	39	50	42	49	44	20	15	53
Year End	722T	740	517	317	212	664	307	114	73	67	83	16	11	12	13	30	9	28	18	37	38	39	43	19	3	15	63

=== Weeks statistics ===
Weeks at	Total weeks	Consecutive
No. 1	8	4
No. 2	6	2
No. 3	13	9
Top 5	54	42
Top 10	139	60
Top 20	439	203
Top 30	575	212
Top 40	699	459
Top 50	774	757
Top 100	914	914

* Source:
* Statistics correct as of 9 July 2025.

== Grand Slam seedings ==
The tournaments won by Bopanna are in boldface, and advances into finals by Bopanna are in italics.

=== Men's doubles ===
Legend seeded No. 1 (0 / 0) seeded No. 2 (**1** / 4) seeded No. 3 (0 / 0) seeded No. 4–10 (0 / 29) seeded No. 11–16 (0 / 11) unseeded (0 / 20)	Longest / total: 0 / 64; 4 / 64; 1 / 64; 8 / 64; 4 / 64; 9 / 64

Year	Australian Open	French Open	Wimbledon	US Open
2006	did not play	did not play	did not qualify	did not play
2007	did not play	did not play	did not qualify	did not play
2008	not seeded	not seeded	not seeded	not seeded
2009	not seeded	not seeded	did not play	did not play
2010	not seeded	not seeded	not seeded	16th (1)
2011	10th	5th	4th	5th
2012	4th	6th	7th	8th
2013	12th	4th	14th	6th
2014	7th	6th	8th	13th
2015	7th	9th	9th	6th
2016	4th	6th	6th	not seeded
2017	15th	9th	8th	10th
2018	10th	13th	12th	15th
2019	15th	not seeded	not seeded	not seeded
2020	not seeded	not seeded	tournament cancelled	not seeded
2021	not seeded	not seeded	not seeded	13th
2022	not seeded	16th	did not play	9th
2023	10th	6th	6th	6th (2)
2024	**2nd (1)**	2nd	2nd	2nd

=== Mixed doubles ===
Legend seeded No. 1 (0 / 0) seeded No. 2 (0 / 3) seeded No. 3 (0 / 2) seeded No. 4–10 (**1** / 18) seeded No. 11–16 (0 / 2) unseeded (0 / 24)	Longest / total: 0 / 49; 2 / 49; 1 / 49; 6 / 49; 1 / 49; 4 / 49

Year	Australian Open	French Open	Wimbledon	US Open
2008	did not play	did not play	not seeded	did not play
2009	did not play	did not play	did not play	did not play
2010	did not play	did not play	not seeded	not seeded
2011	not seeded	not seeded	6th	5th
2012	4th	4th	10th	6th
2013	not seeded	not seeded	7th	3rd
2014	2nd	2nd	7th	6th
2015	not seeded	not seeded	not seeded	2nd
2016	3rd	not seeded	13th	not seeded
2017	not seeded	**7th (1)**	10th	7th
2018	5th (1)	7th	did not play	protected ranking
2019	not seeded	not seeded	13th	not seeded
2020	not seeded	tournament cancelled		
2021	not seeded	did not play	protected ranking	did not play
2022	not seeded	5th	did not play	6th
2023	not seeded (2)	did not play	6th	not seeded
2024	did not play	not seeded	did not play	8th

== Top 10 Record ==
Season	2007	2008	2009	2010	2011	2012	2013	2014	2015	2016	2017	2018	2019	2020	2021	2022	2023	2024	2025	Total
Wins	0	1	1	3	4	9	4	2	9	2	4	3	5	1	1	5	5	3	2	64
Losses	1	4	0	3	9	7	9	9	7	6	8	6	7	2	5	6	6	3	1	100

=== Matches ===
Result	W–L	Opponents	Rank	Tournament	Surface	Partner	Round	Score	RBR
2007
Lost	0–1	(The Bahamas) Mark Knowles (Canada) Daniel Nestor	No. 5 No. 5	Dubai Tennis Championships, UAE	Hard	(Morocco) Younes El Aynaoui	First Round	2–6, 7–6^{(10–8)}, [2–10]	No. 143
2008
Won	1–1	(Australia) Paul Hanley (India) Leander Paes	No. 10; No. 13	Australian Open, Australia	Hard	(United States) Rajeev Ram	Second Round	6–3, 3–6, 7–6^{(8–6)}	No. 68
Lost	1–2	(Canada) Daniel Nestor (Serbia) Nenad Zimonjić	No. 4 No. 11	Dubai Tennis Championships, UAE	Hard	(Pakistan) Aisam-ul-Haq Qureshi	Quarterfinals	6–2, 6–7^{(7–9)}, [6–10]	No. 58
Lost	1–3	(United States) Bob Bryan (United States) Mike Bryan	No. 1 No. 1	French Open, France	Clay	(Pakistan) Aisam-ul-Haq Qureshi	First Round	1–6, 4–6	No. 51
Lost	1–4	(Canada) Daniel Nestor (Serbia) Nenad Zimonjić	No. 3 No. 4	Queen's Club Championships, United Kingdom	Grass	(India) Mahesh Bhupathi	Quarterfinals	4–6, 4–6	No. 52
Lost	1–5	(Czech Republic) Lukáš Dlouhý (India) Leander Paes	No. 12; No. 8	Thailand Open, Thailand	Hard	(Pakistan) Aisam-ul-Haq Qureshi	First Round	6–7^{(3–7)}, 6–4, [7–10]	No. 51
2009
Won	2–5	(United States) Bob Bryan (United States) Mike Bryan	No. 1 No. 1	SAP Open, United States	Hard	(Finland) Jarkko Nieminen	Quarterfinals	6–4, 4–6, [10–5]	No. 85
2010
Lost	2–6	(United States) Bob Bryan (United States) Mike Bryan	No. 1 No. 1	Los Angeles Open, United States	Hard	(Pakistan) Aisam-ul-Haq Qureshi	Semifinals	2–6, 4–6	No. 35
Won	3–6	(United States) Bob Bryan (United States) Mike Bryan	No. 1 No. 1	Washington Open, United States	Hard	(Pakistan) Aisam-ul-Haq Qureshi	Quarterfinals	7–6^{(8–6)}, 7–5	No. 34
Won	4–6	(India) Mahesh Bhupathi (Belarus) Max Mirnyi	No. 7 No. 9	Connecticut Open, United States	Hard	(Pakistan) Aisam-ul-Haq Qureshi	Semifinals	6–4, 6–4	No. 33
Won	5–6	(Canada) Daniel Nestor (Serbia) Nenad Zimonjić	No. 3 No. 3	US Open, United States	Hard	(Pakistan) Aisam-ul-Haq Qureshi	Quarterfinals	6–3, 6–4	No. 33
Lost	5–7	(United States) Bob Bryan (United States) Mike Bryan	No. 1 No. 1	US Open, United States	Hard	(Pakistan) Aisam-ul-Haq Qureshi	Final	6–7^{(5–7)}, 6–7^{(4–7)}	No. 33
Lost	5–8	(Austria) Jürgen Melzer (India) Leander Paes	No. 12; No. 8	Shanghai Masters, China	Hard	(Pakistan) Aisam-ul-Haq Qureshi	Quarterfinals	7–6^{(8–6)}, 6–7^{(6–8)}, [4–10]	No. 18
2011
Lost	5–9	(Czech Republic) Lukáš Dlouhý (Australia) Paul Hanley	No. 8 No. 22	Sydney International, Australia	Hard	(Pakistan) Aisam-ul-Haq Qureshi	Semifinals	5–7, 6–4, [8–10]	No. 16
Lost	5–10	(France) Michaël Llodra (Serbia) Nenad Zimonjić	No. 29; No. 3	Australian Open, Australia	Hard	(Pakistan) Aisam-ul-Haq Qureshi	Third Round	6–3, 6–7^{(6–8)}, 6–7^{(2–7)}	No. 16
Lost	5–11	(France) Michaël Llodra (Serbia) Nenad Zimonjić	No. 25; No. 4	Rotterdam Open, Netherlands	Hard (i)	(Pakistan) Aisam-ul-Haq Qureshi	First Round	4–6, 6–7^{(4–7)}	No. 17
Lost	5–12	(Serbia) Ilija Bozoljac (Serbia) Nenad Zimonjić	No. 152; No. 4	2011 Davis Cup World Group, Serbia	Hard	(India) Somdev Devvarman	First Round	6–4, 3–6, 4–6, 6–7^{(10–12)}	No. 19
Won	6–12	(India) Mahesh Bhupathi (India) Leander Paes	No. 5 No. 7	Indian Wells Masters, United States	Hard	(Pakistan) Aisam-ul-Haq Qureshi	Second Round	6–3, 6–4	No. 19
Won	7–12	(Belarus) Max Mirnyi (Canada) Daniel Nestor	No. 6 No. 3	Monte-Carlo Master, Monaco	Clay	(Pakistan) Aisam-ul-Haq Qureshi	Quarterfinals	6–1, 7–5	No. 16
Lost	7–13	(United States) Bob Bryan (United States) Mike Bryan	No. 1 No. 1	French Open, France	Clay	(Pakistan) Aisam-ul-Haq Qureshi	Quarterfinals	7–6^{(7–2)}, 3–6, 6–7^{(3–7)}	No. 11
Lost	7–14	(United States) Bob Bryan (United States) Mike Bryan	No. 1 No. 1	Canadian Open, Canada	Hard	(Pakistan) Aisam-ul-Haq Qureshi	Quarterfinals	3–3 Ret.	No. 11
Lost	7–15	(France) Michaël Llodra (Serbia) Nenad Zimonjić	No. 7 No. 4	Cincinnati Open, United States	Hard	(Pakistan) Aisam-ul-Haq Qureshi	Quarterfinals	3–6, 2–6	No. 9
Won	8–15	(France) Michaël Llodra (Serbia) Nenad Zimonjić	No. 6 No. 3	Paris Masters, France	Hard (i)	(Pakistan) Aisam-ul-Haq Qureshi	Quarterfinals	3–6, 6–4, [10–6]	No. 16
Won	9–15	(Belarus) Max Mirnyi (Canada) Daniel Nestor	No. 4 No. 5	Paris Masters, France	Hard (i)	(Pakistan) Aisam-ul-Haq Qureshi	Semifinals	6–3, 7–6^{(9–7)}	No. 16
Lost	9–16	(Belarus) Max Mirnyi (Canada) Daniel Nestor	No. 5 No. 5	ATP Finals, United Kingdom	Hard (i)	(Pakistan) Aisam-ul-Haq Qureshi	Round Robin	6–7^{(2–7)}, 6–4, [9–11]	No. 10
Lost	9–17	(France) Michaël Llodra (Serbia) Nenad Zimonjić	No. 3 No. 4	ATP Finals, United Kingdom	Hard (i)	(Pakistan) Aisam-ul-Haq Qureshi	Round Robin	6–7^{(6–8)}, 3–6	No. 10
2012
Won	10–17	(France) Michaël Llodra (Serbia) Nenad Zimonjić	No. 5 No. 6	Miami Open, United States	Hard	(India) Mahesh Bhupathi	Quarterfinals	2–6, 6–3, [10–8]	No. 12
Lost	10–18	(Belarus) Max Mirnyi (Canada) Daniel Nestor	No. 3 No. 3	Miami Open, United States	Hard	(India) Mahesh Bhupathi	Semifinals	2–6, 4–6	No. 12
Lost	10–19	(Sweden) Robert Lindstedt (Romania) Horia Tecău	No. 8 No. 9	Madrid Open, Spain	Clay	(India) Mahesh Bhupathi	Semifinals	4–6, 6–1, [7–10]	No. 12
Won	11–19	(Belarus) Max Mirnyi (Canada) Daniel Nestor	No. 1 No. 1	Italian Open, Italy	Clay	(India) Mahesh Bhupathi	Quarterfinals	6–4, 7–5	No. 12
Lost	11–20	(Belarus) Max Mirnyi (Canada) Daniel Nestor	No. 1 No. 1	Queen's Club Championships, United Kingdom	Grass	(India) Mahesh Bhupathi	Quarterfinals	6–7(7–9), 4–6	No. 12
Won	12–20	(Belarus) Aliaksandr Bury (Belarus) Max Mirnyi	No. 208; No. 1	Summer Olympics, United Kingdom	Grass	(India) Mahesh Bhupathi	First Round	7–6^{(7–4)}, 6–7^{(4–7)}, 8–6	No. 13
Lost	12–21	(Australia) Paul Hanley (Serbia) Nenad Zimonjić	No. 25; No. 4	Canadian Open, Canada	Hard	(India) Mahesh Bhupathi	Second Round	4–6, 6–7^{(6–8)}	No. 13
Won	13–21	(Poland) Mariusz Fyrstenberg (Poland) Marcin Matkowski	No. 6 No. 7	Cincinnati Open, United States	Hard	(India) Mahesh Bhupathi	Quarterfinals	6–4, 3–6, [10–8]	No. 14
Lost	13–22	(Sweden) Robert Lindstedt (Romania) Horia Tecău	No. 8 No. 9	Cincinnati Open, United States	Hard	(India) Mahesh Bhupathi	Final	4–6, 4–6	No. 14
Won	14–22	(Belarus) Max Mirnyi (Canada) Daniel Nestor	No. 1 No. 1	Shanghai Masters, China	Hard	(India) Mahesh Bhupathi	Quarterfinals	7–6^{(9–7)}, 6–4	No. 14
Lost	14–23	(India) Leander Paes (Czech Republic) Radek Štěpánek	No. 5 No. 8	Shanghai Masters, China	Hard	(India) Mahesh Bhupathi	Final	7–6^{(9–7)}, 3–6, [5–10]	No. 14
Won	15–23	(Poland) Mariusz Fyrstenberg (Poland) Marcin Matkowski	No. 10; No. 13	Paris Masters, France	Hard (i)	(India) Mahesh Bhupathi	Quarterfinals	6–7^{(5–7)}, 6–3, [10–4]	No. 12
Won	16–23	(Sweden) Robert Lindstedt (Romania) Horia Tecău	No. 7 No. 8	ATP Finals, United Kingdom	Hard (i)	(India) Mahesh Bhupathi	Round Robin	6–3, 7–5, [10–5]	No. 12
Won	17–23	(Belarus) Max Mirnyi (Canada) Daniel Nestor	No. 5 No. 3	ATP Finals, United Kingdom	Hard (i)	(India) Mahesh Bhupathi	Round Robin	7–6^{(7–5)}, 6–7^{(5–7)}, [10–5]	No. 12
Won	18–23	(India) Leander Paes (Czech Republic) Radek Štěpánek	No. 4 No. 6	ATP Finals, United Kingdom	Hard (i)	(India) Mahesh Bhupathi	Semifinals	4–6, 6–1, [12–10]	No. 12
Lost	18–24	(Spain) Marcel Granollers (Spain) Marc López	No. 10; No. 9	ATP Finals, United Kingdom	Hard (i)	(India) Mahesh Bhupathi	Final	5–7, 6–3, [10–3]	No. 12
2013
Lost	18–25	(Spain) Marcel Granollers (Spain) Marc López	No. 10; No. 6	Apia International Sydney, Australia	Hard	(Brazil) Marcelo Melo	First Round	4–6, 2–6	No. 12
Lost	18–26	(Spain) Marcel Granollers (Spain) Marc López	No. 5 No. 3	Rotterdam Open, Netherlands	Hard	(United States) Rajeev Ram	First Round	6–7^{(2–7)}, 3–6	No. 12
Lost	18–27	(Spain) Marcel Granollers (Spain) Marc López	No. 4 No. 3	Miami Open, United States	Hard	(United States) Rajeev Ram	Second Round	4–6, 6–7^{(5–7)}	No. 12
Lost	18–28	(Pakistan) Aisam-ul-Haq Qureshi (Netherlands) Jean-Julien Rojer	No. 8 No. 7	Portugal Open, Portugal	Clay	(Israel) Andy Ram	Second Round	6–4, 3–6, [4–10]	No. 11
Lost	18–29	(United States) Bob Bryan (United States) Mike Bryan	No. 1 No. 1	Italian Open, Italy	Clay	(India) Mahesh Bhupathi	Final	2–6, 3–6	No. 12
Lost	18–30	(United States) Bob Bryan (United States) Mike Bryan	No. 1 No. 1	Queen's Club Championships, United Kingdom	Grass	(India) Mahesh Bhupathi	Semifinals	4–6, 2–6	No. 10
Won	19–30	(Austria) Alexander Peya (Brazil) Bruno Soares	No. 8 No. 6	Wimbledon, United Kingdom	Grass	(France) Édouard Roger-Vasselin	Third Round	6–4, 4–6, 7–6^{(7–5)}, 6–2	No. 10
Won	20–30	(Sweden) Robert Lindstedt (Canada) Daniel Nestor	No. 5 No. 22	Wimbledon, United Kingdom	Grass	(France) Édouard Roger-Vasselin	Quarterfinals	7–5, 7–6^{(7–3)}, 6–7^{(4–7)}, 6–7^{(3–7)}, 6–2	No. 10
Lost	20–31	(United States) Bob Bryan (United States) Mike Bryan	No. 1 No. 1	Wimbledon, United Kingdom	Grass	(France) Édouard Roger-Vasselin	Semifinals	7–6^{(7–4)}, 4–6, 3–6, 7–5, 3–6	No. 10
Won	21–31	(Austria) Alexander Peya (Brazil) Bruno Soares	No. 6 No. 8	Washington Open, United States	Hard	(Germany) Andre Begemann	First Round	6–2, 6–7^{(4–7)}, [10–5]	No. 3
Won	22–31	(India) Leander Paes (Czech Republic) Radek Štěpánek	No. 10; No. 9	Cincinnati Open, United States	Hard	(France) Édouard Roger-Vasselin	Quarterfinals	6–3, 6–7^{(3–7)}, [10–8]	No. 3
Lost	22–32	(Spain) Marcel Granollers (Spain) Marc López	No. 8 No. 7	Cincinnati Open, United States	Hard	(France) Édouard Roger-Vasselin	Semifinals	5–7, 2–6	No. 3
Lost	22–33	(Croatia) Ivan Dodig (Brazil) Marcelo Melo	No. 11; No. 8	Paris Masters, France	Hard (i)	(France) Édouard Roger-Vasselin	Quarterfinals	6–7^{(5–7)}, 6–3, [4–10]	No. 5
2019
Won	–	(Croatia) Mate Pavić (Serbia) Nenad Zimonjić	No. 7 No. 458	Sofia Open, Bulgaria	Hard	(India) Divij Sharan	First Round	7–6^{(7–2)}, 6–2	No. 37
Won	–	(United Kingdom) Jamie Murray (Brazil) Bruno Soares	No. 5 No. 6	Indian Wells Masters, United States	Hard	(Canada) Denis Shapovalov	First Round	6–4, 6–4	No. 38
Won	–	(Spain) Marcel Granollers (Croatia) Nikola Mektić	No. 25; No. 6	Miami Open, United States	Hard	(Canada) Denis Shapovalov	Second Round	6–1, 6–2	No. 36
Lost	–	(United States) Bob Bryan (United States) Mike Bryan	No. 18; No. 1	Miami Open, United States	Hard	(Canada) Denis Shapovalov	Quarterfinals	3–6, 4–6	No. 36
Lost	–	(United Kingdom) Jamie Murray (Brazil) Bruno Soares	No. 8 No. 9	Monte-Carlo Master, Monaco	Clay	(United Kingdom) Dominic Inglot	First Round	6–4, 3–6, [11–13]	No. 35
Lost	–	(Colombia) Juan Sebastián Cabal (Colombia) Robert Farah	No. 10; No. 10	Italian Open, Italy	Clay	(United Kingdom) Dominic Inglot	First Round	6–7^{(5–7)}, 3–6	No. 41
Won	–	(United States) Bob Bryan (United States) Mike Bryan	No. 36; No. 1	Stuttgart Open, Germany	Grass	(Canada) Denis Shapovalov	First Round	6–4, 3–6, [10–6]	No. 49
Lost	–	(Australia) John Peers (Brazil) Bruno Soares	No. 20; No. 7	Stuttgart Open, Germany	Grass	(Canada) Denis Shapovalov	Final	5–7, 3–6	No. 49
Won	–	(France) Nicolas Mahut (France) Édouard Roger-Vasselin	No. 6 No. 22	Canadian Open, Canada	Hard	(Canada) Denis Shapovalov	First Round	4–6, 6–1, [10–6]	No. 46
Lost	–	(Colombia) Juan Sebastián Cabal (Colombia) Robert Farah	No. 1 No. 1	Cincinnati Open, United States	Hard	(Canada) Denis Shapovalov	Second Round	6–7^{(3–7)}, 7–6^{(7–5)}, [8–10]	No. 39
Won	–	(France) Pierre-Hugues Herbert (France) Nicolas Mahut	No. 18; No. 6	US Open, United States	Hard	(Canada) Denis Shapovalov	First Round	6–3, 6–1	No. 39
Lost	–	(Poland) Łukasz Kubot (Brazil) Marcelo Melo	No. 5 No. 6	Shanghai Masters, China	Hard	(Canada) Denis Shapovalov	Second Round	4–6, 6–3, [7–10]	No. 44
Lost	–	(Poland) Łukasz Kubot (Brazil) Marcelo Melo	No. 6 No. 7	Vienna Open, Austria	Hard	(Canada) Denis Shapovalov	Second Round	0–6, 4–6	No. 40
2020
Lost	–	(Spain) Marcel Granollers (Argentina) Horacio Zeballos	No. 16; No. 4	Cincinnati Open, United States	Hard	(Canada) Denis Shapovalov	First Round	4–6, 6–7^{(1–7)}	No. 38
Won	–	(Colombia) Juan Sebastián Cabal (Colombia) Robert Farah	No. 2 No. 1	Italian Open, Italy	Clay	(Canada) Denis Shapovalov	Second Round	6–3, 3–6, [10–5]	No. 37
Lost	–	(Australia) John Peers (New Zealand) Michael Venus	No. 28; No. 10	European Open, Belgium	Hard	(Netherlands) Matwé Middelkoop	Final	3–6, 4–6	No. 37
2021
Lost	–	(United Kingdom) Jamie Murray (Brazil) Bruno Soares	No. 19; No. 4	Mexican Open, Mexico	Hard	(Pakistan) Aisam-ul-Haq Qureshi	First Round	7–6^{(7–4)}, 2–6, [1–10]	No. 42
Lost	–	(France) Pierre-Hugues Herbert (France) Nicolas Mahut	No. 22; No. 6	Miami Open, United States	Hard	(France) Benoît Paire	First Round	3–6, 2–6	No. 42
Won	–	(Colombia) Juan Sebastián Cabal (Colombia) Robert Farah	No. 3 No. 2	Madrid Open, Spain	Clay	(Canada) Denis Shapovalov	Second Round	6–3, 6–4	No. 42
Lost	–	(Croatia) Nikola Mektić (Croatia) Mate Pavić	No. 3 No. 1	Eastbourne International, United Kingdom	Grass	(India) Divij Sharan	Second Round	3–6, 6–7^{(3–7)}	No. 37
Lost	–	(United States) Rajeev Ram (United Kingdom) Joe Salisbury	No. 10; No. 9	Canadian Open, Canada	Hard	(Croatia) Ivan Dodig	Quarterfinals	6–4, 3–6, [4–10]	No. 44
Lost	–	(United States) Rajeev Ram (United Kingdom) Joe Salisbury	No. 7 No. 6	US Open, United States	Hard	(Croatia) Ivan Dodig	Third Round	7–6^{(7–4)}, 4–6, 6–7^{(3–7)}	No. 48
2022
Lost	–	(Croatia) Nikola Mektić (Croatia) Mate Pavić	No. 2 No. 1	Dubai Tennis Championships, UAE	Hard	(Russia) Aslan Karatsev	First Round	2–6, 6–3, [5–10]	No. 36
Won	–	(Croatia) Nikola Mektić (Croatia) Mate Pavić	No. 3 No. 1	Miami Open, United States	Hard	(Canada) Denis Shapovalov	Second Round	6–3, 7–6^{(7–3)}	No. 30
Won	–	(Spain) Marcel Granollers (Argentina) Horacio Zeballos	No. 6 No. 5	Monte-Carlo Master, Monaco	Clay	(United Kingdom) Jamie Murray	Quarterfinals	7–6^{(7–8)}, 7–6^{(7–8)}	No. 31
Lost	–	(United States) Rajeev Ram (United Kingdom) Joe Salisbury	No. 2 No. 1	Monte-Carlo Master, Monaco	Clay	(United Kingdom) Jamie Murray	Semifinals	6–3, 6–7^{(4–7)}, [9–11]	No. 31
Won	–	(France) Nicolas Mahut (France) Fabrice Martin	No. 3 No. 42	Italian Open, Italy	Clay	(Netherlands) Matwé Middelkoop	First Round	6–3, 6–4	No. 28
Lost	–	(Netherlands) Wesley Koolhof (United Kingdom) Neal Skupski	No. 10; No. 14	Italian Open, Italy	Clay	(Netherlands) Matwé Middelkoop	Second Round	6–7^{(3–7)}, 3–6	No. 28
Won	–	(Croatia) Nikola Mektić (Croatia) Mate Pavić	No. 4 No. 3	French Open, France	Clay	(Netherlands) Matwé Middelkoop	Third Round	6–7^{(5–7)}, 7–6^{(7–3)}, 7–6^{(12–10)}	No. 27
Lost	–	(Poland) Hubert Hurkacz (Croatia) Mate Pavić	No. 37; No. 3	Stuttgart Open, Germany	Grass	(Canada) Denis Shapovalov	Semifinals	6–7^{(1–7)}, 6–7^{(5–7)}	No. 25
Won	–	(Spain) Marcel Granollers (Argentina) Horacio Zeballos	No. 4 No. 3	Hamburg Open, Germany	Clay	(Netherlands) Matwé Middelkoop	Semifinals	3–6, 6–3, [10–3]	No. 21
Lost	–	(Croatia) Nikola Mektić (Croatia) Mate Pavić	No. 10; No. 9	Astana Open, Kazakhstan	Hard	(Netherlands) Matwé Middelkoop	First Round	6–7^{(5–7)}, 2–6	No. 19
Lost	–	(Netherlands) Wesley Koolhof (United Kingdom) Neal Skupski	No. 4 No. 3	Paris Masters, France	Hard (i)	(Netherlands) Matwé Middelkoop	Quarterfinals	3–6, 4–6	No. 19
2023
Lost	–	(Croatia) Ivan Dodig (United States) Austin Krajicek	No. 10; No. 9	Rotterdam Open, Netherlands	Hard (i)	(Australia) Matthew Ebden	Final	6–7^{(5–7)}, 6–2, [10–12]	No. 18
Lost	–	(Croatia) Nikola Mektić (Croatia) Mate Pavić	No. 8 No. 7	Dubai Tennis Championships, UAE	Hard	(Australia) Matthew Ebden	First Round	5–7, 6–4, [7–10]	No. 15
Won	–	(Netherlands) Wesley Koolhof (United Kingdom) Neal Skupski	No. 1 No. 1	Indian Wells Masters, United States	Hard	(Australia) Matthew Ebden	Final	6–3, 2–6, [10–8]	No. 15
Won	–	(Croatia) Nikola Mektić (Croatia) Mate Pavić	No. 10; No. 7	Barcelona Open, Spain	Clay	(Australia) Matthew Ebden	First Round	7–6^{(7–4)}, 3–6, [10–8]	No. 13
Lost	–	(Netherlands) Wesley Koolhof (United Kingdom) Neal Skupski	No. 1 No. 1	Barcelona Open, Spain	Clay	(Australia) Matthew Ebden	Semifinals	4–6, 5–7	No. 13
Won	–	(Netherlands) Wesley Koolhof (United Kingdom) Neal Skupski	No. 1 No. 1	Madrid Open, Spain	Clay	(Australia) Matthew Ebden	Quarterfinals	6–3, 6–2	No. 13
Lost	–	(Netherlands) Wesley Koolhof (United Kingdom) Neal Skupski	No. 1 No. 1	Queen's Club Championships, United Kingdom	Grass	(Australia) Matthew Ebden	Quarterfinals	3–6, 6–7^{(5–7)}	No. 13
Lost	–	(Netherlands) Wesley Koolhof (United Kingdom) Neal Skupski	No. 1 No. 1	Wimbledon, United Kingdom	Grass	(Australia) Matthew Ebden	Semifinals	5–7, 4–6	No. 12
Lost	–	(United States) Rajeev Ram (United Kingdom) Joe Salisbury	No. 5 No. 6	US Open, United States	Hard	(Australia) Matthew Ebden	Final	6–2, 3–6, 4–6	No. 14
Won	–	(Spain) Marcel Granollers (Argentina) Horacio Zeballos	No. 10; No. 9	Paris Masters, France	Hard (i)	(Australia) Matthew Ebden	Quarterfinals	6–3, 6–2	No. 8
Won	–	(Netherlands) Wesley Koolhof (United Kingdom) Neal Skupski	No. 5 No. 3	ATP Finals, Italy	Hard	(Australia) Matthew Ebden	Round Robin	6–4, 7–6^{(7–5)}	No. 6
2024
Lost	–	(United States) Rajeev Ram (United Kingdom) Joe Salisbury	No. 6 No. 7	Adelaide International, Australia	Hard	(Australia) Matthew Ebden	Final	7–5, 5–7, [9–11]	No. 3
Won	–	(Netherlands) Wesley Koolhof (Croatia) Nikola Mektić	No. 8 No. 43	Australian Open, Australia	Hard	(Australia) Matthew Ebden	Third Round	7–6^{(10–8)}, 7–6^{(7–4)}	No. 3
Won	–	(Spain) Marcel Granollers (Argentina) Horacio Zeballos	No. 9 No. 8	Miami Open, United States	Hard	(Australia) Matthew Ebden	Semifinals	6–1, 6–4	No. 2
Won	–	(Croatia) Ivan Dodig (United States) Austin Krajicek	No. 5 No. 1	Miami Open, United States	Hard	(Australia) Matthew Ebden	Final	6–7^{(3–7)}, 6–3, [10–6]	No. 2
Lost	–	(Italy) Simone Bolelli (Italy) Andrea Vavassori	No. 9 No. 7	ATP Finals, Italy	Hard	(Australia) Matthew Ebden	Round Robin	2–6, 3–6	No. 12
Lost	–	(El Salvador) Marcelo Arévalo (Croatia) Mate Pavić	No. 1 No. 1	ATP Finals, Italy	Hard	(Australia) Matthew Ebden	Round Robin	5–7, 3–6	No. 12
2025
Won	–	(Italy) Simone Bolelli (Italy) Andrea Vavassori	No. 7 No. 8	ATP Qatar Open	Hard	(Portugal) Nuno Borges	First Round	7–6^{(7–2)}, 7–6^{(7–4)}	No. 21
Won	–	(Italy) Simone Bolelli (Italy) Andrea Vavassori	No. 6 No. 7	Monte-Carlo Master, Monaco	Clay	(United States) Ben Shelton	Second Round	2–6, 7–6^{(7–4)}, [10–7]	No. 43
Lost	–	(Finland) Harri Heliövaara (United Kingdom) Henry Patten	No. 3 No. 4	French Open, France	Clay	(Czech Republic) Adam Pavlásek	Third Round	2–6, 6–7^{(5–7)}	No. 33

== ATP Tour career earnings ==
Year	Earnings ($)	Money list rank
1999	896	—N/a
2000	2,279	—N/a
2001	4,363	—N/a
2002	11,755	470
2003	17,772	413
2004	5,181	741
2005	14,668	448
2006	53,907	261
2007	89,145	208
2008	122,851	185
2009	82,167	229
2010	289,434	99
2011	427,535	74
2012	495,231	62
2013	337,805	104
2014	270,386	126
2015	648,688	64
2016	333,067	121
2017	517,790	90
2018	302,651	146
2019	287,030	164
2020	174,941	167
2021	190,263	200
2022	414,386	143
2023	1,181,789	51
2024	885,251	86
2025	292,284	218
Career	7,455,122	159
