= Ajay Ramaswami =

Indian tennis player

- Country (sports): India
- Born: 7 August 1980 (age 45)
- Prize money: $21,729

Singles
- Career record: 0–0 (at ATP Tour level, Grand Slam level, and in Davis Cup)
- Career titles: 0; 0 Challenger, 0 Futures
- Highest ranking: No. 569 (6 December 2004)

Doubles
- Career record: 1–1 (at ATP Tour level, Grand Slam level, and in Davis Cup)
- Career titles: 0; 0 Challenger, 13 Futures
- Highest ranking: No. 287 (25 April 2005)
- Last updated on: 16 October 2022.

Ajay Ramaswami (born 7 August 1980) is a former Indian tennis player.

== Playing career ==
Ramaswami has a career high ATP singles ranking of 569 achieved on 6 December 2004. He also has a career high ATP doubles ranking of 287 achieved on 25 April 2005.

Ramaswami made his ATP main draw debut at the 2002 Tata Open in the doubles draw partnering Srinath Prahlad after the pair received entry into the main draw as wildcards.

== ATP Challenger and ITF Futures finals ==
=== Singles: 1 (0–1) ===
Legend ATP Challenger (0–0) ITF Futures (0–1)	Finals by surface Hard (0–1) Clay (0–0) Grass (0–0) Carpet (0–0)

Result	W–L	Date	Tournament	Tier	Surface	Opponent	Score
Loss	0–1	Nov 2002	India F7, New Delhi	Futures	Hard	(India) Vinod Sridhar	2–6, 4–6

=== Doubles: 19 (13–6) ===
Legend ATP Challenger (0–0) ITF Futures (13–6)	Finals by surface Hard (10–5) Clay (3–0) Grass (0–0) Carpet (0–1)

Result	W–L	Date	Tournament	Tier	Surface	Partner	Opponents	Score
Win	1–0	Oct 2001	India F4, Bombay	Futures	Hard	(India) Srinath Prahlad	(India) Rohan Bopanna (India) Vijay Kannan	6–4, 6–4
Win	2–0	Oct 2001	India F5, Indore	Futures	Clay	(India) Srinath Prahlad	(India) Nitten Kirrtane (India) Sunil-Kumar Sipaeya	6–3, 6–0
Win	3–0	Nov 2001	India F6, Pune	Futures	Hard	(India) Srinath Prahlad	(Israel) Lior Dahan (Israel) Eyal Erlich	6–7^{(1–7)}, 6–4, 6–4
Win	4–0	Aug 2002	India F3, Delhi	Futures	Hard	(India) Harsh Mankad	(India) Rohan Gajjar (India) Jaco Mathew	6–4, 6–4
Win	5–0	Sep 2002	India F4, Gulbarga	Futures	Hard	(India) Harsh Mankad	(Slovakia) Viktor Bruthans (Slovakia) Michal Varsanyi	6–4, 6–4
Win	6–0	Nov 2002	India F6, Chandigarh	Futures	Hard	(India) Sunil-Kumar Sipaeya	(India) Rohan Bopanna (India) Vijay Kannan	7–6^{(7–5)}, 6–2
Loss	6–1	Nov 2002	India F8, Davanagere	Futures	Hard	(India) Sunil-Kumar Sipaeya	(India) Vijay Kannan (India) Vishal Uppal	3–6, 6–3, 5–7
Loss	6–2	Jan 2003	India F2, New Delhi	Futures	Carpet	(India) Harsh Mankad	(India) Vishal Uppal (India) Mustafa Ghouse	3–6, 4–6
Win	7–2	Jan 2003	India F3, Jorhat	Futures	Clay	(India) Mustafa Ghouse	(Finland) Lauri Kiiski (Sweden) Tobias Steinel-Hansson	6–3, 6–2
Loss	7–3	Mar 2003	India F5, Kolkata	Futures	Hard	(India) Vijay Kannan	(India) Vishal Uppal (India) Harsh Mankad	1–6, 4–6
Loss	7–4	Aug 2003	Tunisia F2, Megrine	Futures	Hard	(India) Sunil-Kumar Sipaeya	(Monaco) Thomas Oger (France) Nicolas Tourte	4–6, 2–6
Win	8–4	Aug 2003	Tunisia F3, El Menzah	Futures	Hard	(India) Sunil-Kumar Sipaeya	(Monaco) Thomas Oger (Netherlands) Bart De Gier	6–1, 6–1
Win	9–4	Nov 2003	Thailand F2, Nakhon Ratchasima	Futures	Hard	(India) Sunil-Kumar Sipaeya	(Austria) Martin Slanar (Austria) Herbert Wiltschnig	6–2, 4–6, 6–3
Win	10–4	Nov 2003	India F6, Dehra Dun	Futures	Hard	(India) Sunil-Kumar Sipaeya	(India) Mustafa Ghouse (India) Vishal Uppal	6–2, 6–1
Loss	10–5	Dec 2003	India F8, Mumbai	Futures	Hard	(India) Sunil-Kumar Sipaeya	(India) Mustafa Ghouse (Pakistan) Aisam Qureshi	6–7^{(6–8)}, 6–2, 5–7
Win	11–5	Sep 2004	India F3, Hyderabad	Futures	Hard	(India) Mustafa Ghouse	(United States) Chris Kwon (Chinese Taipei) Liu Tai-Wei	6–3, 7–6^{(7–3)}
Loss	11–6	Jan 2005	India F1, Mumbai	Futures	Hard	(India) Harsh Mankad	(India) Mustafa Ghouse (India) Vishal Uppal	4–6, 6–3, 6–7^{(7–9)}
Win	12–6	Jan 2005	India F2, Delhi	Futures	Hard	(India) Harsh Mankad	(India) Ashutosh Singh (Israel) Dekel Valtzer	6–4, 6–2
Win	13–6	Mar 2005	India F3, Kolkata	Futures	Clay	(India) Vishal Uppal	(Hong Kong) Karan Rastogi (India) Ashutosh Singh	6–2, 6–3
