= 2002 Tata Open – Doubles =

Doubles
- 2002 Tata Open

Final
- Champions: (India) Mahesh Bhupathi (India) Leander Paes
- Runners-up: (Czech Republic) Tomáš Cibulec (Czech Republic) Ota Fukárek
- Score: 5–7, 6–2, 7–5

Events
Singles	Doubles
← 2001 ·	Tata Open	· 2003 →

Byron Black and Wayne Black were the defending champions but only Byron competed that year with Fabrice Santoro.

Black and Santoro lost in the semifinals to Tomáš Cibulec and Ota Fukárek.

Mahesh Bhupathi and Leander Paes won in the final 5–7, 6–2, 7–5 against Cibulec and Fukárek.

== Seeds ==
1. (India) Mahesh Bhupathi / (India) Leander Paes (champions)
2. (Zimbabwe) Byron Black / (France) Fabrice Santoro (semifinals)
3. (Czech Republic) František Čermák / (Czech Republic) Petr Luxa (semifinals)
4. (Czech Republic) Tomáš Cibulec / (Czech Republic) Ota Fukárek (final)

== Draw ==
=== Key ===
- Q = Qualifier
- WC = Wild card
- LL = Lucky loser
- Alt = Alternate
- SE = Special exempt
- PR = Protected ranking
- ITF = ITF entry
- JE = Junior exempt
- w/o = Walkover
- r = Retired
- d = Defaulted
- SR = Special ranking

First round
1	(India) M Bhupathi (India) L Paes	6	4	6
(Sweden) T Johansson (Romania) A Pavel	3	6	3
(United States) D Bowen (Australia) A Fisher	6	1	3
(Spain) J Balcells (Switzerland) G Bastl	2	6	6
3	(Czech Republic) F Čermák (Czech Republic) P Luxa	6	6^{7}	6
(South Africa) J Coetzee (Netherlands) S Groen	4	7^{9}	1
WC	(India) P Amritraj (India) M Ghouse	6^{2}	2
WC	(India) S Prahlad (India) A Ramaswami	7^{7}	6
(Czech Republic) M Tabara (Czech Republic) J Vaněk	6	5	3
(Argentina) L Arnold (Argentina) G Cañas	4	7	6
(Australia) T Crichton (Australia) J Kerr	6^{3}	6	2
4	(Czech Republic) T Cibulec (Czech Republic) O Fukárek	7^{7}	4	6
WC	(India) R Bopanna (Spain) C Cuadrado	4	5
(Czech Republic) J Levinský (Czech Republic) D Škoch	6	7
(Israel) J Erlich (Georgia (country)) I Labadze	2	4
2	(Zimbabwe) B Black (France) F Santoro	6	6

Quarterfinals
1	(India) M Bhupathi (India) L Paes	w/o
(Spain) J Balcells (Switzerland) G Bastl
3	(Czech Republic) F Čermák (Czech Republic) P Luxa	6	6
WC	(India) S Prahlad (India) A Ramaswami	2	2
(Argentina) L Arnold (Argentina) G Cañas	6^{7}	6^{6}
4	(Czech Republic) T Cibulec (Czech Republic) O Fukárek	7^{9}	7^{8}
(Czech Republic) J Levinský (Czech Republic) D Škoch	3	1
2	(Zimbabwe) B Black (France) F Santoro	6	6

Semifinals
1	(India) M Bhupathi (India) L Paes	7	6^{5}	7
3	(Czech Republic) F Čermák (Czech Republic) P Luxa	5	7^{7}	5
4	(Czech Republic) T Cibulec (Czech Republic) O Fukárek	6	3	7^{7}
2	(Zimbabwe) B Black (France) F Santoro	4	6	6^{1}

Final
1	(India) M Bhupathi (India) L Paes	5	6	7
4	(Czech Republic) T Cibulec (Czech Republic) O Fukárek	7	2	5
