= 2006 Kingfisher Airlines Tennis Open – Doubles =

Doubles
- 2006 Kingfisher Airlines Tennis Open

Final
- Champions: (Croatia) Mario Ančić (India) Mahesh Bhupathi
- Runners-up: (India) Rohan Bopanna (India) Mustafa Ghouse
- Score: 6–4, 6–7^{(6–8)}, [10–8]

Details
- Draw: 16 (2WC)
- Seeds: 4

Events
Singles	Doubles
← 2005 ·	Kingfisher Airlines Tennis Open	· 2007 →

This is the first edition of the tournament that was played in Mumbai. Last year champions (in Ho Chi Minh City) were Lars Burgsmüller and Philipp Kohlschreiber. None competed this year.

Mario Ančić and Mahesh Bhupathi won the title by defeating Rohan Bopanna and Mustafa Ghouse 6–4, 6–7^{(6–8)}, [10–8] in the final.

== Seeds ==
1. (Austria) Alexander Peya / (Germany) Björn Phau (first round)
2. (Poland) Łukasz Kubot / (Czech Republic) Robin Vik (quarterfinals)
3. (Croatia) Mario Ančić / (India) Mahesh Bhupathi (champions)
4. (United Kingdom) James Auckland / (United Kingdom) Jamie Delgado (semifinals)

== Draw ==
=== Key ===
- Q = Qualifier
- WC = Wild card
- LL = Lucky loser
- Alt = Alternate
- SE = Special exempt
- PR = Protected ranking
- ITF = ITF entry
- JE = Junior exempt
- w/o = Walkover
- r = Retired
- d = Defaulted
- SR = Special ranking

=== Draw ===
First round
1	(Austria) A Peya (Germany) B Phau	3	4
(India) R Bopanna (India) M Ghouse	6	6
WC	(India) K Rastogi (India) S Singh	3	3
(South Africa) R de Voest (Russia) I Kunitsyn	6	6
4	(United Kingdom) J Auckland (United Kingdom) J Delgado	6	5	[10]
(Italy) S Galvani (Italy) D Sanguinetti	3	7	[8]
(Argentina) JM del Potro (Argentina) J Mónaco	6	6
(Austria) S Koubek (Germany) F Moser	3	4
(India) L Paes (Pakistan) A Qureshi	6	6
(Paraguay) R Delgado (Greece) K Economidis	4	4
WC	(India) Christopher Marquis (India) Akash Wagh	0	1
3	(Croatia) M Ančić (India) M Bhupathi	6	6
(Germany) D Gremelmayr (Germany) S Greul	6	1	[10]
(Chinese Taipei) Y-h Lu (Denmark) K Pless	4	6	[8]
(Netherlands) J Smit (Netherlands) M van Haasteren	7^{9}	6^{4}	[7]
2	(Poland) Ł Kubot (Czech Republic) R Vik	6^{7}	7^{7}	[10]

Quarterfinals
(India) R Bopanna (India) M Ghouse	7^{9}	6
(South Africa) R de Voest (Russia) I Kunitsyn	6^{7}	1
4	(United Kingdom) J Auckland (United Kingdom) J Delgado	w/o
(Argentina) JM del Potro (Argentina) J Mónaco
(India) L Paes (Pakistan) A Qureshi	1	7	[3]
3	(Croatia) M Ančić (India) M Bhupathi	6	5	[10]
(Germany) D Gremelmayr (Germany) S Greul	1	6	[10]
2	(Poland) Ł Kubot (Czech Republic) R Vik	6	4	[5]

Semifinals
(India) R Bopanna (India) M Ghouse	4	6	[10]
4	(United Kingdom) J Auckland (United Kingdom) J Delgado	6	3	[7]
3	(Croatia) M Ančić (India) M Bhupathi	w/o
(Germany) D Gremelmayr (Germany) S Greul

Final
(India) R Bopanna (India) M Ghouse	4	7^{8}	[8]
3	(Croatia) M Ančić (India) M Bhupathi	6	6^{6}	[10]
