= 2007 Kingfisher Airlines Tennis Open – Singles =

Singles
- 2007 Kingfisher Airlines Tennis Open

Final
- Champion: (France) Richard Gasquet
- Runner-up: (Belgium) Olivier Rochus
- Score: 6–3, 6–4

Events
Singles	Doubles
← 2006 ·	Kingfisher Airlines Tennis Open	· 2008 →

Dmitry Tursunov was the defending champion, but chose not to participate that year.

Richard Gasquet won in the final 6–3, 6–4, against Olivier Rochus.

== Seeds ==
1. (France) Richard Gasquet (champion)
2. (Australia) Lleyton Hewitt (quarterfinals)
3. (France) Paul-Henri Mathieu (first round)
4. (Finland) Jarkko Nieminen (quarterfinals)
5. (France) Fabrice Santoro (semifinals)
6. (Austria) Stefan Koubek (quarterfinals)
7. (France) Julien Benneteau (first round)
8. (Belgium) Olivier Rochus (final)

== Draw ==
=== Key ===
- Q = Qualifier
- WC = Wild card
- LL = Lucky loser
- Alt = Alternate
- SE = Special exempt
- PR = Protected ranking
- ITF = ITF entry
- JE = Junior exempt
- w/o = Walkover
- r = Retired
- d = Defaulted
- SR = Special ranking

=== Finals ===
Semifinals
1	(France) Richard Gasquet	6	6
5	(France) Fabrice Santoro	0	3
8	(Belgium) Olivier Rochus	6	6
(Germany) Rainer Schüttler	4	4

Final
1	(France) Richard Gasquet	6	6
8	(Belgium) Olivier Rochus	3	4

=== Top half ===
First round
1	(France) R Gasquet	6	6
(Belgium) K Vliegen	1	2
(Italy) F Fognini	6	7
WC	(India) S Devvarman	3	6^{8}
(Germany) B Phau	6	2	6
(South Africa) W Moodie	3	6	4
(Chile) P Capdeville	3	2
6	(Austria) S Koubek	6	6
4	(Finland) J Nieminen	6^{5}	6	2
Q	(Italy) D Sanguinetti	7	1	0 r
Q	(Japan) T Matsui	6	7
Q	(India) N Singh	4	6^{7}
(France) N Devilder	3	6	7
WC	(India) R Bopanna	6	3	6^{9}
(France) É Roger-Vasselin	1	2
5	(France) F Santoro	6	6

Second round
1	(France) R Gasquet	6	6
(Italy) F Fognini	0	1
(Germany) B Phau	6	3	5
6	(Austria) S Koubek	4	6	7
4	(Finland) J Nieminen	6	6
Q	(Japan) T Matsui	0	4
(France) N Devilder	6	3	2
5	(France) F Santoro	2	6	6

Quarterfinals
1	(France) R Gasquet	6	6
6	(Austria) S Koubek	2	4
4	(Finland) J Nieminen	3	4
5	(France) F Santoro	6	6

Semifinals
1	(France) R Gasquet	6	6
5	(France) F Santoro	0	3

=== Bottom half ===
First round
8	(Belgium) O Rochus	6	6
(Netherlands) R Haase	2	2
(Spain) I Navarro	6	6
LL	(India) P Raja	4	1
(Czech Republic) J Vaněk	6	5	4
(Chinese Taipei) Y-h Lu	4	7	6
WC	(Germany) N Kiefer	6	6
3	(France) P-H Mathieu	4	3
7	(France) J Benneteau	5	3
(Germany) R Schüttler	7	6
(Serbia) V Troicki	6	7
(Pakistan) A-u-H Qureshi	2	6^{4}
(Serbia) B Pašanski	1	6	6
(Argentina) S Roitman	6	3	3
Q	(Chinese Taipei) T Chen	3	3
2	(Australia) L Hewitt	6	6

Second round
8	(Belgium) O Rochus	3	6	6
(Spain) I Navarro	6	3	4
(Chinese Taipei) Y-h Lu	3	3
WC	(Germany) N Kiefer	6	6
(Germany) R Schüttler	6	6^{4}	7
(Serbia) V Troicki	2	7	6^{1}
(Serbia) B Pašanski	6^{2}	2
2	(Australia) L Hewitt	7	6

Quarterfinals
8	(Belgium) O Rochus	4
WC	(Germany) N Kiefer	1	r
(Germany) R Schüttler	6	7
2	(Australia) L Hewitt	3	5

Semifinals
8	(Belgium) O Rochus	6	6
(Germany) R Schüttler	4	4
