= 2007 Kingfisher Airlines Tennis Open – Doubles =

Doubles
- 2007 Kingfisher Airlines Tennis Open

Final
- Champions: (Sweden) Robert Lindstedt (Finland) Jarkko Nieminen
- Runners-up: (India) Rohan Bopanna (Pakistan) Aisam-ul-Haq Qureshi
- Score: 7–6^{(7–3)}, 7–6^{(7–5)}

Events
Singles	Doubles
← 2006 ·	Kingfisher Airlines Tennis Open	· 2008 →

Mario Ančić and Mahesh Bhupathi were the defending champions, but Ančić chose not to participate, and only Bhupathi competed that year.
Bhupathi partnered with Fabrice Santoro, but withdrew.

Robert Lindstedt and Jarkko Nieminen won in the final 7–6^{(7–3)}, 7–6^{(7–5)}, against Rohan Bopanna and Aisam-ul-Haq Qureshi.

== Seeds ==
1. (India) Mahesh Bhupathi / (France) Fabrice Santoro (withdrew)
2. (Czech Republic) František Čermák / (Czech Republic) Leoš Friedl (first round)
3. (Sweden) Robert Lindstedt / (Finland) Jarkko Nieminen (champions)
4. (Switzerland) Yves Allegro / (Belgium) Kristof Vliegen (quarterfinals)

== Draw ==
=== Key ===
- Q = Qualifier
- WC = Wild card
- LL = Lucky loser
- Alt = Alternate
- SE = Special exempt
- PR = Protected ranking
- ITF = ITF entry
- JE = Junior exempt
- w/o = Walkover
- r = Retired
- d = Defaulted
- SR = Special ranking

=== Draw ===
First round
ALT	(India) P Raja (India) V Shokeen	3	2
(Serbia) B Pašanski (Serbia) V Troicki	6	6
(United States) P Briaud (South Africa) W Moodie	7	6
(Chinese Taipei) Y-h Lu (Czech Republic) J Vaněk	6^{2}	4
3	(Sweden) R Lindstedt (Finland) J Nieminen	w/o
(Germany) N Kiefer (Germany) R Schüttler
WC	(India) M Ghouse (India) K Rastogi	2	6	[3]
(United Kingdom) J Auckland (United Kingdom) R Hutchins	6	3	[10]
(Germany) L Burgsmüller (Belgium) O Rochus	6	6
ALT	(United States) A Davidson (India) R Gajjar	1	3
(France) N Devilder (France) É Roger-Vasselin	5	3
4	(Switzerland) Y Allegro (Belgium) K Vliegen	7	6
(India) R Bopanna (Pakistan) A-u-H Qureshi	6	6
WC	(India) S Amritraj (India) S Devvarman	3	2
(Spain) I Navarro (Argentina) S Roitman	7	6
2	(Czech Republic) F Čermák (Czech Republic) L Friedl	6^{3}	4

Quarterfinals
(Serbia) B Pašanski (Serbia) V Troicki	6	7
(United States) P Briaud (South Africa) W Moodie	4	6^{3}
3	(Sweden) R Lindstedt (Finland) J Nieminen	7	6^{7}	0
(United Kingdom) J Auckland (United Kingdom) R Hutchins	5	7	0 r
(Germany) L Burgsmüller (Belgium) O Rochus	7	7
4	(Switzerland) Y Allegro (Belgium) K Vliegen	5	6^{5}
(India) R Bopanna (Pakistan) A-u-H Qureshi	w/o
(Spain) I Navarro (Argentina) S Roitman

Semifinals
(Serbia) B Pašanski (Serbia) V Troicki	1	5
3	(Sweden) R Lindstedt (Finland) J Nieminen	6	7
(Germany) L Burgsmüller (Belgium) O Rochus	2	3
(India) R Bopanna (Pakistan) A-u-H Qureshi	6	6

Final
3	(Sweden) R Lindstedt (Finland) J Nieminen	7	7
(India) R Bopanna (Pakistan) A-u-H Qureshi	6^{3}	6^{5}
