= New Delhi Challenger =

Defunct tennis tournament
- Founded: 1999
- Abolished: 2008
- Editions: 8
- Location: New Delhi, India
- Category: ATP Challenger Series
- Surface: Hard
- Draw: 32S/32Q/16D
- Prize money: $50,000

The New Delhi Challenger was a professional tennis tournament played on outdoor hard courts. It was part of the Association of Tennis Professionals (ATP) Challenger Series. It was held eight times in New Delhi, in 1999, 2003, 2007 and 2008. It was also held i 2014, 2015 and 2016, but halted from 2017 due to lack of funds. Now Delhi hosts Delhi Open Challenger as of 2025.

== Past finals ==
=== Singles ===
Year	Champion	Runner-up	Score
1999	(India) Leander Paes	(India) Mahesh Bhupathi	7–5, 6–4
2000–02	Not held		
2003	(Switzerland) Ivo Heuberger	(Thailand) Danai Udomchoke	6–2, 6–3
2004–06	Not held		
2007 (1)	(Pakistan) Aisam-ul-Haq Qureshi	(Chinese Taipei) An Jae-sung	7–5, 6–4
2007 (2)	(Russia) Mikhail Elgin	(Czech Republic) Tomáš Cakl	7–6^{(7–4)}, 6–7^{(6–8)}, 6–3
2008 (1)	(Chinese Taipei) Lu Yen-hsun	(United States) Brendan Evans	5–7, 7–6^{(7–5)}, 6–3
2008 (2)	(Japan) Go Soeda	(Chinese Taipei) Lu Yen-hsun	6–3, 3–6, 6–4
2008 (3)	(Republic of Ireland) Conor Niland	(Czech Republic) Tomáš Cakl	6–4, 6–4
2008 (4)	(Germany) Dieter Kindlmann	(United Kingdom) Josh Goodall	7–6^{(7–3)}, 6–3

=== Doubles ===
Year	Champions	Runner-ups	Score
1999	(Israel) Noam Behr (Israel) Eyal Ran	(United Kingdom) Barry Cowan (South Africa) Wesley Whitehouse	6–3, 4–6, 6–4
2000–02	Not held		
2003	(Bulgaria) Radoslav Lukaev (Russia) Dmitry Vlasov	(Israel) Jonathan Erlich (Israel) Andy Ram	7–6^{(8–6)}, 4–6, 6–2
2004–06	Not held		
2007 (1)	(South Africa) Rik de Voest (South Africa) Wesley Moodie	(India) Rohan Bopanna (Pakistan) Aisam-ul-Haq Qureshi	6–4, 7–6^{(7–4)}
2007 (2)	(China) Yu Xinyuan (China) Zeng Shaoxuan	(Russia) Pavel Chekhov (Russia) Mikhail Elgin	6–3, 6–3
2008 (1)	(Australia) Colin Ebelthite (Australia) Sam Groth	(Kuwait) Mohammad Ghareeb (Ukraine) Illya Marchenko	2–6, 7–6^{(7–5)}, [10–8]
2008 (2)	(India) Harsh Mankad (India) Ashutosh Singh	(United States) Brendan Evans (India) Mustafa Ghouse	7–5, 6–3
2008 (3)	(United Kingdom) Josh Goodall (United Kingdom) James Ward	(Japan) Tasuku Iwami (Japan) Hiroki Kondo	6–4, 6–1
2008 (4)	(India) Harsh Mankad (India) Ashutosh Singh	(India) Rohan Gajjar (India) Purav Raja	4–6, 6–4, [11–9]
