= 2002 Tata Open – Singles =

Singles
- 2002 Tata Open

Final
- Champion: (Argentina) Guillermo Cañas
- Runner-up: (Thailand) Paradorn Srichaphan
- Score: 6–4, 7–6^{(7–2)}

Details
- Draw: 32
- Seeds: 8

Events
Singles	Doubles
← 2001 ·	Tata Open	· 2003 →

Michal Tabara was the defending champion but lost in the first round to Dennis van Scheppingen.

Guillermo Cañas won in the final 6–4, 7–6^{(7–2)} against Paradorn Srichaphan.

== Seeds ==
1. (Argentina) Guillermo Cañas (champion)
2. (Sweden) Thomas Johansson (quarterfinals)
3. (France) Fabrice Santoro (quarterfinals)
4. (Romania) Andrei Pavel (semifinals)
5. (Belarus) Max Mirnyi (first round)
6. (Slovakia) Dominik Hrbatý (second round)
7. (Czech Republic) Michal Tabara (first round)
8. (Denmark) Kristian Pless (first round)

== Draw ==
=== Key ===
- Q = Qualifier
- WC = Wild card
- LL = Lucky loser
- Alt = Alternate
- ITF = ITF entry
- PR = Protected ranking
- SR = Special ranking
- SE = Special exempt
- JE = Junior exempt
- JR = Junior Accelerator Programme entrant
- CO = College Accelerator Programme entrant
- NG = Next Gen Accelerator Program entrant
- w/o = Walkover
- r = Retired
- d = Defaulted

=== Finals ===
Semifinals
1	(Argentina) G Cañas	4	6	6
(Slovakia) Karol Kučera	6	3	3
4	(Romania) Andrei Pavel	3	4
(Thailand) Paradorn Srichaphan	6	6

Final
1	(Argentina) Guillermo Cañas	6	7^{7}
(Thailand) Paradorn Srichaphan	4	6^{2}

=== Top half ===
First round
1	(Argentina) G Cañas	6	6
(Switzerland) G Bastl	4	2
Q	(Croatia) I Karlović	7^{7}	6
Q	(Zimbabwe) B Black	6^{2}	3
WC	(India) M Bhupathi	2	2
(Czech Republic) J Vaněk	6	6
(Israel) N Okun	6	6
8	(Denmark) K Pless	2	4
3	(France) F Santoro	7^{8}	6
(Netherlands) P Wessels	6^{6}	3
(Georgia (country)) I Labadze	6	7^{7}
Q	(France) T Dupré	4	6^{0}
(Spain) J Balcells	4	6	5
(Slovakia) K Kučera	6	3	7
(Netherlands) D van Scheppingen	4	6	6
7	(Czech Republic) M Tabara	6	3	4

Second round
1	(Argentina) G Cañas	7	6
Q	(Croatia) I Karlović	5	2
(Czech Republic) J Vaněk	3	7^{7}	6
(Israel) N Okun	6	6^{5}	4
3	(France) F Santoro	6	6
(Georgia (country)) I Labadze	2	3
(Slovakia) K Kučera	7	7^{7}
(Netherlands) D van Scheppingen	5	6^{2}

Quarterfinals
1	(Argentina) G Cañas	7	1
(Czech Republic) J Vaněk	5	1^{r}
3	(France) F Santoro	2	7^{11}	6^{5}
(Slovakia) K Kučera	6	6^{9}	7^{7}

Semifinals
1	(Argentina) G Cañas	4	6	6
(Slovakia) K Kučera	6	3	3

=== Bottom half ===
First round
6	(Slovakia) D Hrbatý	6	6
(Germany) A Pretzsch	1	4
(Czech Republic) O Fukárek	7^{7}	2	4
(Spain) Á Calatrava	6^{4}	6	6
Q	(Italy) S Galvani	6	6
(Italy) F Luzzi	1	3
LL	(Costa Rica) J A Marín	3	2
4	(Romania) A Pavel	6	6
5	(Belarus) M Mirnyi	3	3
(Thailand) P Srichaphan	6	6
WC	(India) L Paes	3	1
(Russia) A Stoliarov	6	6
(Belgium) O Rochus	6	6
(United Kingdom) M Lee	4	3
(Switzerland) I Heuberger	4	4
2	(Sweden) T Johansson	6	6

Second round
6	(Slovakia) D Hrbatý	6	5	2
(Spain) Á Calatrava	2	7	6
Q	(Italy) S Galvani	3	3
4	(Romania) A Pavel	6	6
(Thailand) P Srichaphan	6	6
(Russia) A Stoliarov	2	1
(Belgium) O Rochus	6	3	4
2	(Sweden) T Johansson	4	6	6

Quarterfinals
(Spain) Á Calatrava	6^{6}	1
4	(Romania) A Pavel	7^{8}	6
(Thailand) P Srichaphan	4	6	6
2	(Sweden) T Johansson	6	3	2

Semifinals
4	(Romania) A Pavel	3	4
(Thailand) P Srichaphan	6	6
