= Ashutosh Singh (tennis) =

Indian tennis player

- Full name: Ashutosh Singh
- Country (sports): India
- Born: 25 September 1982 (age 44)
- Plays: Right-handed
- Prize money: $42,760

Singles
- Highest ranking: No. 525 (7 July 2008)

Doubles
- Career record: 0–1
- Highest ranking: No. 150 (23 February 2009)

Ashutosh Singh (born 25 September 1982) is a former professional tennis player from India.

== Biography ==
A right-handed player from Delhi, Singh comes from a family deeply involved in tennis. He is the son of Balram Singh, a national tennis coach. His brother Lalit is a chair umpire who has officiated at grand slam level.

=== Tennis career ===
Singh competed mostly on the Futures and Challenger circuits. Most successful as a doubles player, he won 17 Futures titles and two Challenger titles in doubles.

His only main draw appearance on the ATP Tour came in the doubles at the 2007 Chennai Open. He and Vishal Uppal were entered as wildcards and lost in the first round to Tomas Behrend and Robin Vik.

Both of his two Challenger titles came in 2008, partnering Harsh Mankad in separate tournaments in New Delhi. This made them the first Indian pair in two years to win a tournament at Challenger level.

In 2009 he reached his highest ranking in doubles of 150 in the world.

=== Personal life ===
He is married to Renuka Singh.

== Challenger titles ==
=== Doubles: (2) ===
No.	Year	Tournament	Surface	Partner	Opponents	Score
1.	2008	New Delhi, India	Hard	(India) Harsh Mankad	(United States) Brendan Evans (India) Mustafa Ghouse	7–5, 6–3
2.	2008	New Delhi, India	Hard	(India) Harsh Mankad	(India) Rohan Gajjar (India) Purav Raja	4–6, 6–4, 11–9
