= Adam Davidson (tennis) =

American tennis player

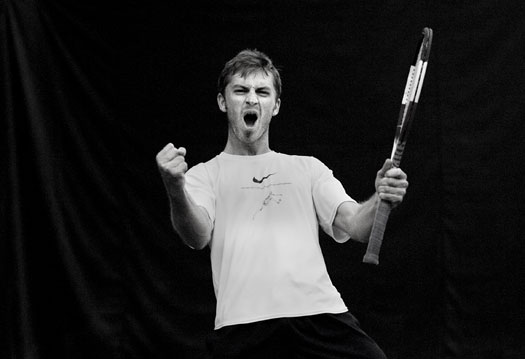
- Country (sports): United States
- Born: February 22, 1983 (age 42) Los Angeles, California, U.S.
- Height: 6 ft 0 in (183 cm)
- Plays: Right-handed

Doubles
- Career record: 0–1
- Highest ranking: No. 527 (October 22, 2007)

Adam Davidson (born February 22, 1983) is a former American professional tennis player. Primarily a doubles specialist, he represented the United States on the ATP World Tour, ATP Challenger Tour and the Intercollegiate Tennis Association All-Star Team.

== College career ==
Davidson was, three times, a first team All-American selection at Azusa Pacific University. He and his doubles partner, Sam Fletcher, were ranked #1 in the country for three seasons (2003, 2004, 2005). Davidson's highest national collegiate singles ranking was #14, in 2003. As team captain of the APU team in 2005, he led the Cougars to their first ever NAIA National Championship.

== Professional career ==
=== 2005 ===
Davidson and partner Sam Fletcher (AUS) defeated former Jr. US Open, Wimbledon and Australian Open champions Brendan Evans and Scott Oudsema in ITF Pro Circuit Futures event in Auburn, CA.

=== 2006 ===
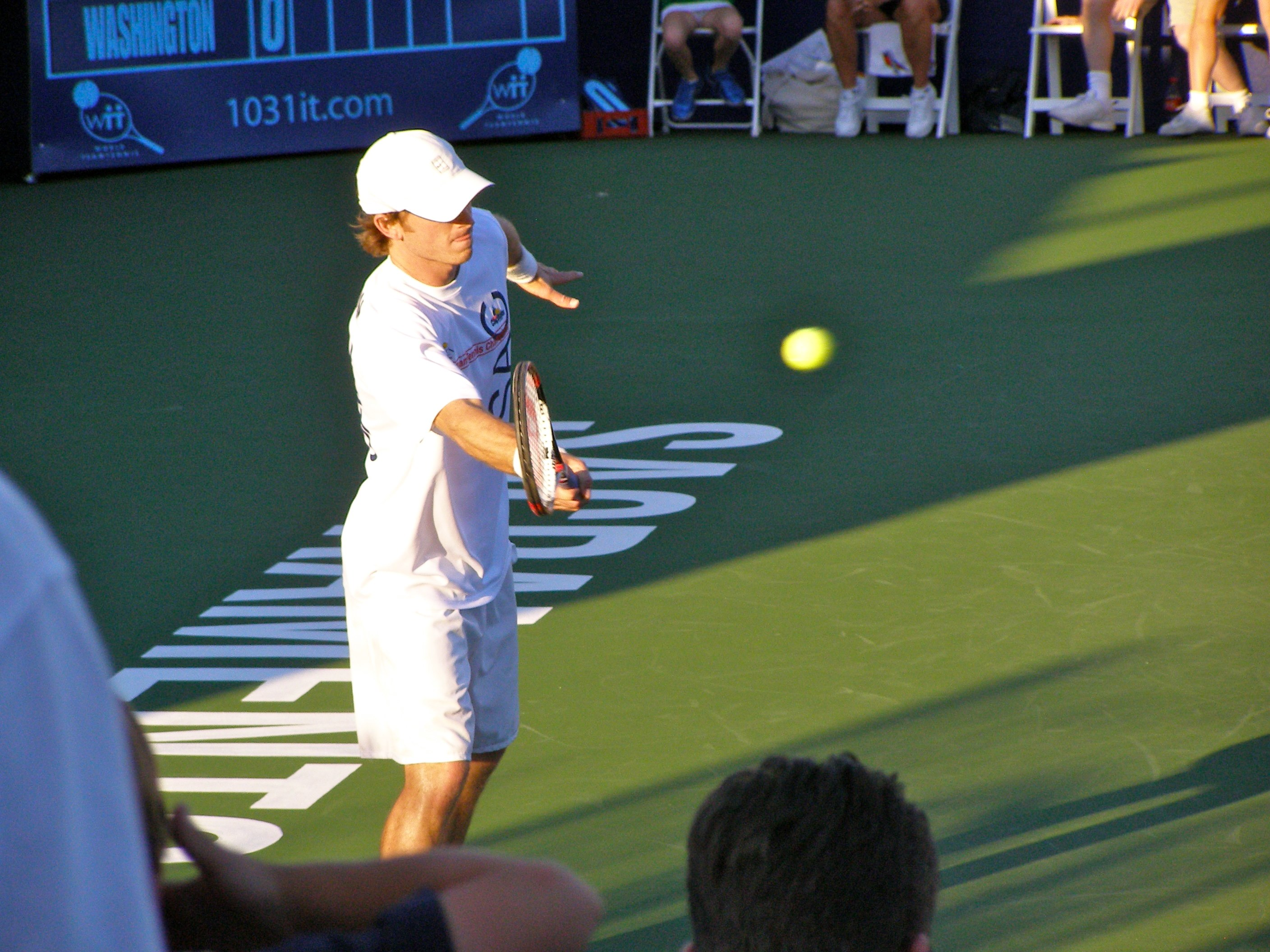
Adam Davidson playing for the Sacramento Capitals in July 2006

Partnering a future ATP top 125 doubles player, Patrick Briaud (USA), Davidson won his first ATP World Tour title at the ITF Pro Circuit Futures F13 $10,000 in Tunisia in December. The duo defeated future ATP #51 doubles player Artem Sitak of New Zealand and his partner Ludwig Pellerin of France in the final by a score of 6–3, 6–7^{(5)}, 6–4. In July, Davidson played as the male reserve for the Sacramento Capitals of the World Team Tennis league. He played alongside Anna Kournikova, Mark Knowles, and competed against Pete Sampras of the Newport Beach Breakers. He was coached by Wayne Bryan, father of Bob and Mike Bryan.

=== 2007 ===
Davidson's most successful year on tour, he reached a career high of #527 in the world. Partnering Steven Amritraj (IND) at the ATP World Tour's $50,000 Calabasas Pro Tennis Championships, Davidson defeated two future top 50 ATP doubles players in Rajeev Ram and Bobby Reynolds marking the best win of his career at that time. They next defeated another ATP top 100 player Tim Smyczek and his partner Alberto Francis before falling to Robert Kendrick (top ATP ranking #69) and Cecil Mamiit (top ATP ranking #72) in the semi-finals Davidson also gained entry to his first ATP World Tour 250 event, in Mumbai, India, the 2007 Kingfisher Airlines Tennis Open. Partnering Rohan Gajjar (IND), the duo fell in the round of 16 to tour veterans Olivier Rochus and Lars Burgsmuller. Rochus won the French Open in doubles and was ranked #24 in the world in singles. Davidson reached a career high ranking of #527 in the world on October 22, 2007.
