= 2007 Kingfisher Airlines Tennis Open =

- Date: September 24–30
- Edition: 11th
- Category: ATP International Series
- Draw: 32S / 16D
- Prize money: $391,000
- Surface: Hard / Outdoor
- Location: Mumbai, India
- Venue: Cricket Club of India

Champions

Singles
- (France) Richard Gasquet

Doubles
- (Sweden) Robert Lindstedt / (Finland) Jarkko Nieminen
← 2006 ·	Kingfisher Airlines Tennis Open	· 2008 →

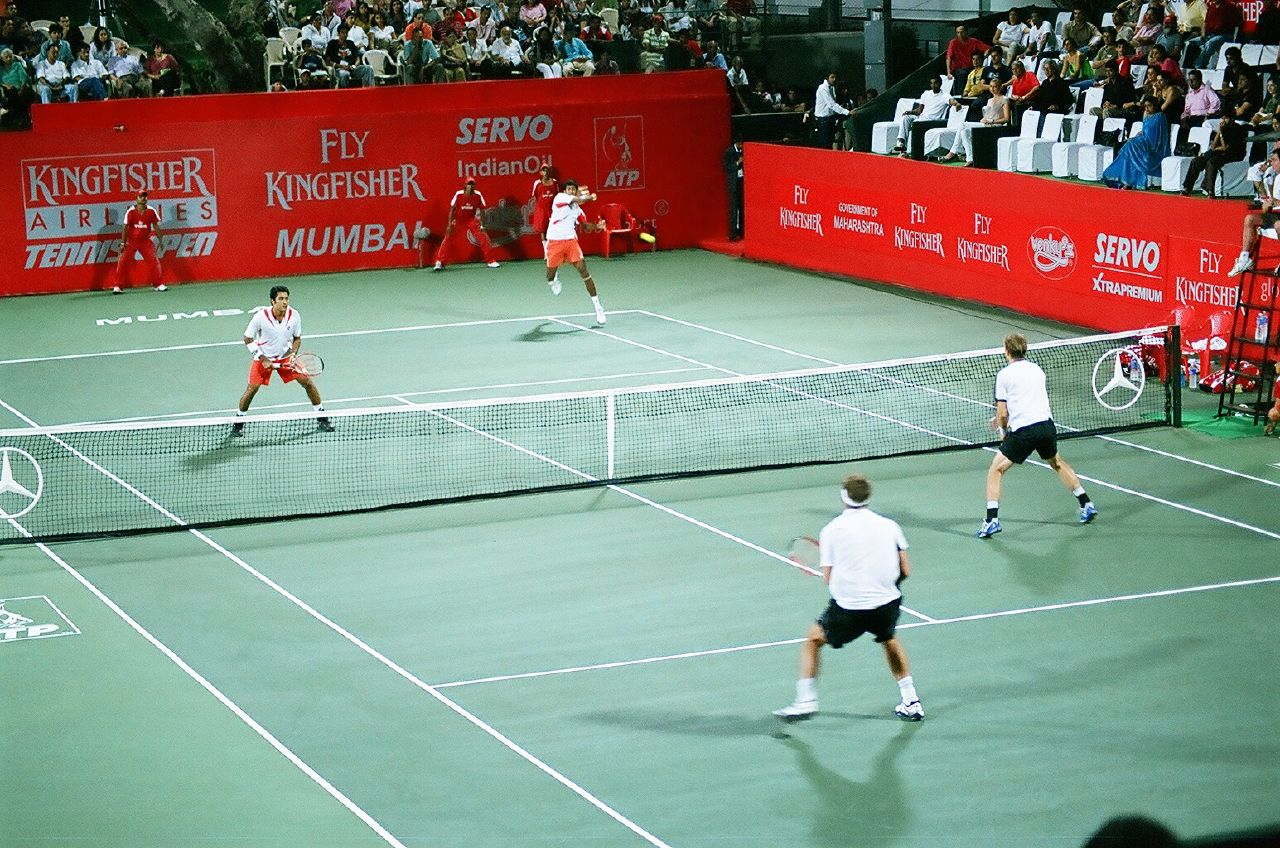
The 2007 Men's doubles finals

The 2007 Kingfisher Airlines Tennis Open was a tennis tournament played on outdoor hard courts. It was the 11th edition of the Kingfisher Airlines Tennis Open, and was part of the International Series of the 2007 ATP Tour. It took place at the Cricket Club of India in Mumbai, India, from September 24 through September 30, 2007.

The singles field was led by ATP No. 14, Wimbledon semifinalist, Estoril runner-up Richard Gasquet, former World No. 1, Hamburg and Cincinnati Masters semifinalist, Las Vegas winner Lleyton Hewitt, and Casablanca and Gstaad champion Paul-Henri Mathieu. Also present were Marseille and Halle semifinalist Jarkko Nieminen, Newport titlist Fabrice Santoro, Stefan Koubek, Julien Benneteau and Olivier Rochus.

== Finals ==
=== Singles ===
(France) Richard Gasquet defeated (Belgium) Olivier Rochus 6–3, 6–4

- It was Richard Gasquet's 1st title of the year, and his 5th overall.

=== Doubles ===
(Sweden) Robert Lindstedt / (Finland) Jarkko Nieminen defeated (India) Rohan Bopanna / (Pakistan) Aisam-ul-Haq Qureshi 7–6^{(7–3)}, 7–6^{(7–5)}
