= 2002 Tata Open =

Indian men's tennis tournament

- Date: 31 December 2001 – 6 January
- Edition: 7th
- Category: International Series
- Draw: 32S / 16D
- Prize money: $375,000
- Surface: Hard / outdoor
- Location: Chennai, India
- Venue: SDAT Tennis Stadium

Champions

Singles
- (Argentina) Guillermo Cañas

Doubles
- (India) Mahesh Bhupathi / (India) Leander Paes
- Maharashtra Open

The 2002 Tata Open was a men's tennis tournament played on outdoor hard courts at the SDAT Tennis Stadium in Chennai, India and was part of the International Series of the 2002 ATP Tour. The tournament ran from 31 December 2001 until 6 January 2002, with the first-seeded Guillermo Cañas winning the singles title.

== Finals ==
=== Singles ===
(Argentina) Guillermo Cañas defeated (Thailand) Paradorn Srichaphan 6–4, 7–6^{(7–2)}

- It was Cañas's 1st title of the year and the 4th of his career.

=== Doubles ===
(India) Mahesh Bhupathi / (India) Leander Paes defeated (Czech Republic) Tomáš Cibulec / (Czech Republic) Ota Fukárek 5–7, 6–2, 7–5

- It was Bhupathi's 1st title of the year and the 22nd of his career. It was Paes's 1st title of the year and the 25th of his career.
