= 2006 Kingfisher Airlines Tennis Open – Singles =

Singles
- 2006 Kingfisher Airlines Tennis Open

Final
- Champion: (Russia) Dmitry Tursunov
- Runner-up: (Czech Republic) Tomáš Berdych
- Score: 6–3, 4–6, 7–6^{(7–5)}

Details
- Draw: 32 (3WC/4Q)
- Seeds: 8

Events
Singles	Doubles
- Kingfisher Airlines Tennis Open

Dmitry Tursunov defeated Tomáš Berdych 6–3, 4–6, 7–6^{(7–5)} to win the 2006 Kingfisher Airlines Tennis Open singles event.

== Seeds ==
A champion seed is indicated in bold text while text in italics indicates the round in which that seed was eliminated.

1. (Spain) Tommy Robredo (semifinals)
2. (Croatia) Mario Ančić (quarterfinals)
3. (Czech Republic) Tomáš Berdych (final)
4. (Russia) Dmitry Tursunov **(champion)**
5. (Spain) Carlos Moyá (first round)
6. (Germany) Björn Phau (quarterfinals)
7. (Argentina) Juan Mónaco (first round)
8. (South Africa) Wesley Moodie (second round)

== Draws ==
Key

- Q = Qualifier
- WC = Wild card
- LL = Lucky loser
- Alt = Alternate
- ITF = ITF entry
- PR = Protected ranking
- SR = Special ranking
- SE = Special exempt
- JE = Junior exempt
- JR = Junior Accelerator Programme entrant
- CO = College Accelerator Programme entrant
- NG = Next Gen Accelerator Program entrant
- w/o = Walkover
- r = Retired
- d = Defaulted

=== Finals ===
Semifinals					Finals
1	(Spain) Tommy Robredo	6^{2}	**6**	1
4	(Russia) **Dmitry Tursunov**	**7^{7}**	3	**6**	4	(Russia) **Dmitry Tursunov**	**6**	4	**7^{7}**
3	(Czech Republic) **Tomáš Berdych**	**7^{7}**	**6**		3	(Czech Republic) Tomáš Berdych	3	**6**	6^{5}
	(Austria) Stefan Koubek	6^{2}	2

=== Section 1 ===
First round
1	(Spain) **T Robredo**	**6**	**6**
(Austria) A Peya	4	2
(Greece) K Economidis	2	6^{3}
(Germany) **M Berrer**	**6**	**7^{7}**
(Paraguay) **R Delgado**	**6**	**2**
(Italy) D Sanguinetti	3	1	R
(Argentina) **J Del Potro**	**6**	**6**
5	(Spain) C Moyà	3	2
4	(Russia) **D Tursunov**	**6**	**7**
WC	(India) A Wagh	2	5
(Germany) D Gremelmayr	5	5
(Denmark) **K Pless**	**7**	**7**
Q	(United Kingdom) **J Auckland**	**6**	**6**
Q	(Germany) F Moser	1	4
WC	(India) R Bopanna	**6**	6^{5}	4
8	(South Africa) **W Moodie**	3	**7^{7}**	**6**

Second round
1	(Spain) **T Robredo**	5	**6**	**6**
(Germany) M Berrer	**7**	2	4
(Paraguay) **R Delgado**	**6**	**4**
(Argentina) J Del Potro	3	1	R
4	(Russia) **D Tursunov**	6^{5}	**6**	**6**
(Denmark) K Pless	**7^{7}**	3	4
Q	(United Kingdom) **J Auckland**	**7^{7}**	**7^{7}**
8	(South Africa) W Moodie	6^{3}	6^{5}

Quarterfinals
1	(Spain) **T Robredo**	**6**	**7^{7}**
(Paraguay) R Delgado	2	6^{1}
4	(Russia) **D Tursunov**	3	**6**	**6**
Q	(United Kingdom) J Auckland	**6**	3	4

Semifinals
1	(Spain) T Robredo	6^{2}	**6**	1
4	(Russia) **D Tursunov**	**7^{7}**	3	**6**

=== Section 2 ===
First round
6	(Germany) **B Phau**	**6**	**6**
WC	(India) K Rastogi	0	3
Q	(Netherlands) J Smit	**6**	0	6^{5}
Q	(Japan) **G Motomura**	3	**6**	**7^{7}**
(Germany) **S Greul**	**7^{7}**	**6**
(Taiwan) L Yen-Hsun	6^{4}	3
(Poland) L Kubot	2	2
3	(Czech Republic) **T Berdych**	**6**	**6**
7	(Argentina) J Mónaco	6^{5}	4
(Austria) **S Koubek**	**7^{7}**	**6**
(France) **N Devilder**	**6**	4	**6**
(South Africa) R de Voest	4	**6**	3
(Italy) **S Galvani**	5	**6**	**6**
(Czech Republic) R Vik	**7**	4	4
(Russia) I Kunitsyn	3	2
2	(Croatia) **M Ančić**	**6**	**6**

Second round
6	(Germany) **B Phau**	**6**	**6**
Q	(Japan) G Motomura	3	3
(Germany) S Greul	6^{4}	4
3	(Czech Republic) **T Berdych**	**7^{7}**	**6**
(Austria) **S Koubek**	**7**	**6**
(France) N Devilder	5	3
(Italy) S Galvani	1	6
2	(Croatia) **M Ančić**	**6**	**7**

Quarterfinals
6	(Germany) B Phau	3	5
3	(Czech Republic) **T Berdych**	**6**	**7**
(Austria) **S Koubek**	3	**6**	**6**
2	(Croatia) M Ančić	**6**	4	3

Semifinals
3	(Czech Republic) **T Berdych**	**7^{7}**	**6**
(Austria) S Koubek	6^{2}	2
