= 2006 Kingfisher Airlines Tennis Open =

- Date: September 25 - October 2
- Edition: 1st
- Category: ATP International Series
- Draw: 32S / 16D
- Prize money: $355,000
- Surface: Hard / Outdoor
- Location: Mumbai, India
- Venue: Cricket Club of India

Champions

Singles
- (Russia) Dmitry Tursunov

Doubles
- (Croatia) Mario Ančić / (India) Mahesh Bhupathi
Kingfisher Airlines Tennis Open	· 2007 →

The 2006 Kingfisher Airlines Tennis Open was an ATP tournament held at Cricket Club of India in Mumbai, India and played on outdoor hard courts. The tournament was part of the ATP International Series of the 2006 ATP Tour and was held from September 25 to October 2.

Dmitry Tursunov won his only title of the year, and the 1st of his career.

== Finals ==
=== Singles ===
(Russia) Dmitry Tursunov defeated (Czech Republic) Tomáš Berdych 6–3, 4–6, 7–6^{(7–5)}

=== Doubles ===
(Croatia) Mario Ančić / (India) Mahesh Bhupathi defeated (India) Rohan Bopanna / (India) Mustafa Ghouse 6–4, 6–7^{(6–8)}, [10–8]
