= Vishal Uppal =

Indian tennis player

Vishal Uppal (born 10 November 1976) is a tennis player from India. He participated in the Davis Cup in 2000 and 2002.

He actually started playing cricket at school as a young boy, but switched to tennis at the age of 11. He played in Father O'Brien's tennis tournament at school and lost in the semifinals. This loss strengthen his resolve to keep playing and achieve victory. In 2002, he represented India in the Davis Cup and he won the men's doubles bronze with Mustafa Ghouse. He played in the Davis Cup in both 2000 and 2002.

He graduated from the Shri Ram College of Commerce and coaches other students in tennis today including students at the Junior Davis Cup. He is also part of the junior AITA selection committee.
