= Mustafa Ghouse =

Indian tennis player

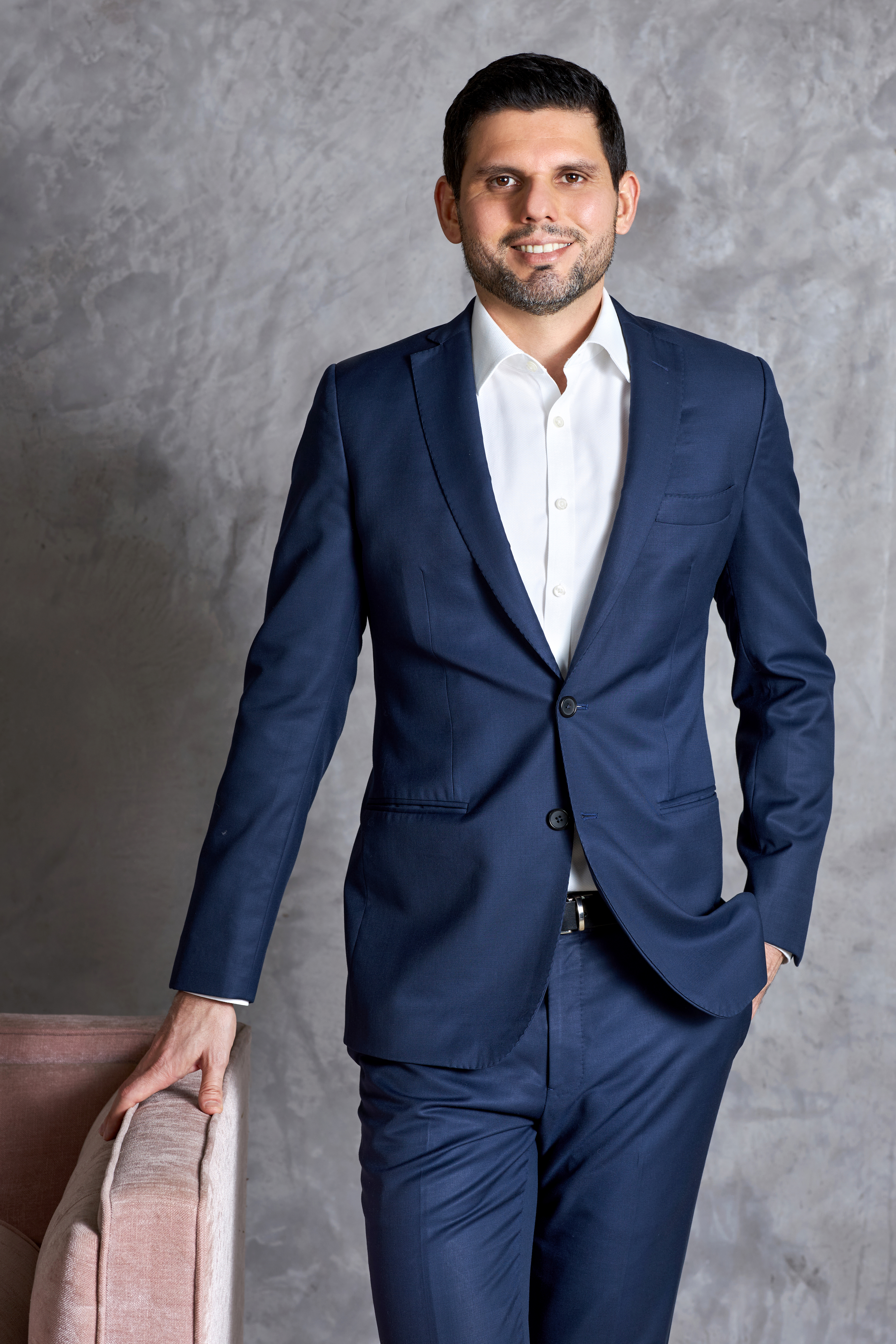
- Ghouse in June 2020
- Country (sports): India
- Born: 19 August 1980 (age 46)
- Height: 6 ft 1 in (185 cm)
- Prize money: $77,802

Singles
- Career record: 0–0
- Highest ranking: No. 500 (28 October 2002)

Doubles
- Career record: 3–10
- Highest ranking: No. 131 (20 August 2007)

Mustafa Ghouse (born 19 August 1980) is General Partner at Centre Court Capital, a venture capital firm focused on investments in sports technology, fitness and wellness, gaming and interactive media. He was the chief executive officer of JSW Sports, the sports vertical of The JSW Group. The JSW Group owns and operates Indian Super League club Bengaluru FC and Pro-Kabaddi League team Haryana Steelers. Ghouse is also the Director at JSW Sports' Indian Premier League franchise Delhi Capitals and recently also became owner of Punjab Franchise of Hockey India League 2024 to start from December last.

Prior to his involvement in Management of Sport, Ghouse was a professional tennis player who represented India at the 2002 Asian Games in Busan, South Korea and the 2006 Asian Games in Doha, Qatar, winning a bronze medal in the Men's Doubles event at the 2002 edition with partner, Vishal Uppal.

== JSW Sports ==
Ghouse was appointed as CEO of JSW Sports in 2012. Since its inception in 2012 as a programme to support Indian Olympic athletes, the Sports division of the JSW Group has added teams in the Indian Premier League, Pro-Kabaddi League and Indian Super League to its portfolio. The JSW Group has also led the establishment of the Inspire Institute of Sport, India's first privately funded high-performance training centre for future Olympians, in Bellary, Karnataka.

In December 2018, JSW Sports announced that it will also manage commercial and marketing interests of its athletes.

JSW Sports was awarded the Rashtriya Khel Protsahan Puruskar Award by the Government of India for its contribution towards sport in India, in the years 2014 and 2018. JSW Sports also won the FICCI India Sports awards in the category of Best Company Promoting Sports (Private Sector) in 2018.

== JSW Sports Excellence Program ==
As CEO of JSW Sports, Ghouse has led the JSW Sports Excellence Programme (SEP) since it commenced in 2012 to support Olympic Disciplines - Boxing, Judo, Wrestling, Swimming and Athletics. Some of the current names in the JSW Sports Sports Excellence Programme stable include Asian, Commonwealth Games and Tokyo Olympic 2020 gold medal-winning javelin thrower Neeraj Chopra, 2016 Rio Olympic bronze medal-winning female wrestler Sakshi Malik, Asian and Commonwealth Games gold medal-winning wrestler Bajrang Punia and 2015 Commonwealth Youth Games gold medal-winning high-jumper Tejaswin Shankar.

== Bengaluru FC ==
As CEO of JSW Sports, Ghouse has been a part of the building of Bengaluru FC from its ideation stage, leading the submission of the tender when invited by the AIFF in 2013. In his role as Chief Operating Officer of Bengaluru FC in its initial year as an I-League Club, he introduced a professional approach to football clubs in India, following the best practices from European teams, imposing a strict sports science regime and made the club a first in India to obtain an AFC license in its initial year.

He has been recognised as playing a key role in the club's success in its initial years, with Bengaluru FC going on to win the I-League title in its debut season before becoming the first Indian club to reach the final of the AFC Cup, in 2016.

== Inspire Institute of Sport ==
Ghouse has been involved in the conceptualisation and execution of the Inspire Institute of Sport (IIS), a training facility for future Olympians, set in the town of Bellary in Karnataka. Along with architect Alok Shetty, Ghouse made multiple trips to foreign institutes in the United States of America, Doha, South Africa, Europe and within Asia, for the purposes of on-ground research.

Launched on the Indian Independence Day of 2018, the IIS is spread over 42 acres and houses over 300 athletes, with focus on boxing, wrestling, judo and athletics. The institute has a staff that comprises over 40 individuals from eight countries, who work at its various facilities.

The advisory board at the Inspire Institute of Sport includes Indian tennis star Mahesh Bhupathi and former Indian cricket team captain Sourav Ganguly. In 2020, the IIS was announced as a member of The Association of Sports Institutes in Asia (ASIA).

== Delhi Capitals ==
Following The JSW Group's investment in Delhi's Indian Premier League franchise, in December 2018, Ghouse was appointed its Director. The Delhi IPL Franchise would later be renamed Delhi Capitals. For a year since the investment in 2017, he led efforts to reboot the team. Beginning with its rebranding as Delhi Capitals the following season, former India national team cricketers Sourav Ganguly and Mohammed Kaif were brought on board to the leadership team. Ghouse had stressed that the important aspect of The JSW Group's business philosophy was reconnecting with Delhi's Cricket culture while also building a winning team on the pitch that the fans would come to adore.

== Personal life ==
Ghouse lives in Mumbai, Maharashtra. He is married to Sarah Sham, Principal Designer at Essajees Atelier.

== Tennis career ==
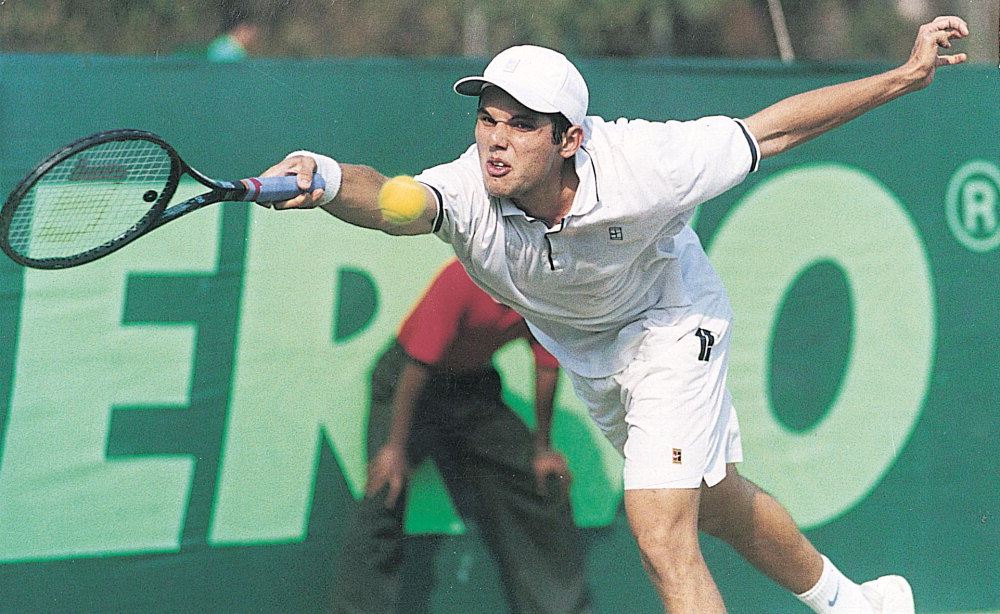
Mustafa Ghouse in action at the National Grasscourt Championship, in Kolkata, in 2001.

A right-handed player, Ghouse debuted in India's Davis Cup team in 2001, aged 21, after claiming the National Tennis Championship crown in both the singles and doubles event, in Kolkata, with Vishal Uppal as his partner.

Representing India, Ghouse won the bronze medal in the Men's Doubles event at the 2002 Asian Games, in Busan, South Korea, alongside Uppal. Having reached the semi-finals, the duo went down to eventual silver medalists Chung Hee-seok and Lee Hyung-taik of South Korea, who were beaten by Leander Paes and Mahesh Bhupathi in the final.

Ghouse teamed up with Rohan Bopanna at the 2006 Kingfisher Airlines Tennis Open, in Mumbai, held as part of the 2006 ATP Tour, where the duo ended as runners up in the Men's Doubles event to the Croat-Indian pairing of Mario Ancic and Mahesh Bhupathi 6–4, 6–7^{(6–8)}, [10–8].

In December 2006, he and Bopanna would team up once again as part of the Indian contingent at the 2006 Asian Games in Doha, Qatar. After convincing wins over teams from Bahrain and Chinese Taipei, Ghouse and Bopanna bowed out to South Korean pairing of Jun Woong-sun and Kim Sun-yong 7–6, 6–1 in the quarterfinals.

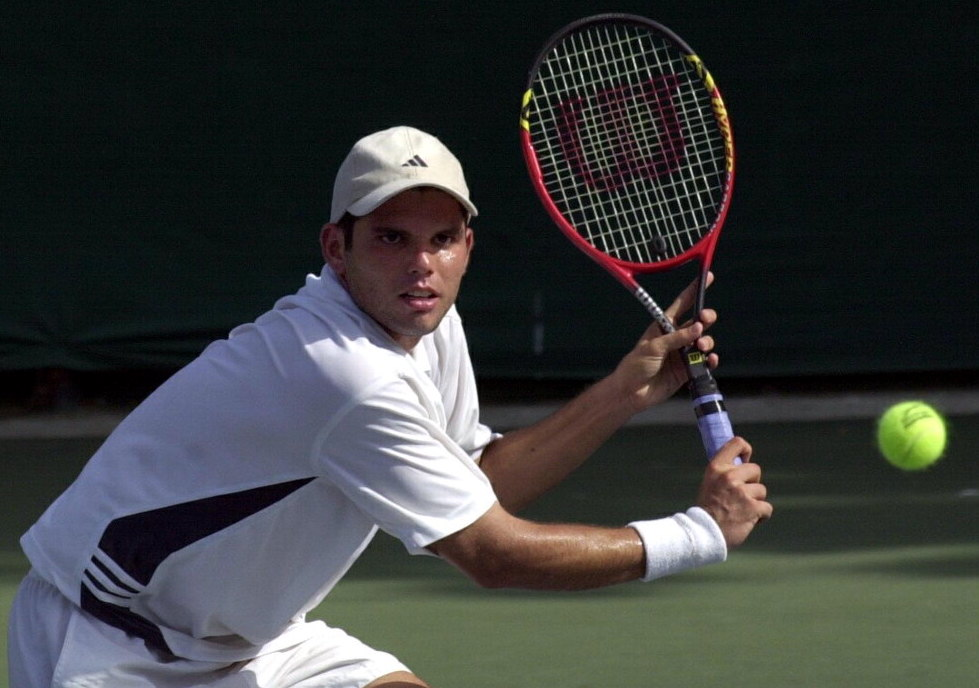
Mustafa Ghouse in action against Hayato Furukawa of Japan, at the ITF Satellite Tournament, in Mumbai, in 2003.

Ghouse attained a career high singles ranking of 500 in October 2002, and was ranked at a career-best 131 in the doubles circuit in August 2007.

Between 2002 and 2007, Ghouse claimed 17 doubles titles with various partners and one singles title, at the Namibia F1 Futures in 2006.

Ghouse announced his retirement from all forms of professional tennis in 2008.
