= 2012 Novak Djokovic tennis season =

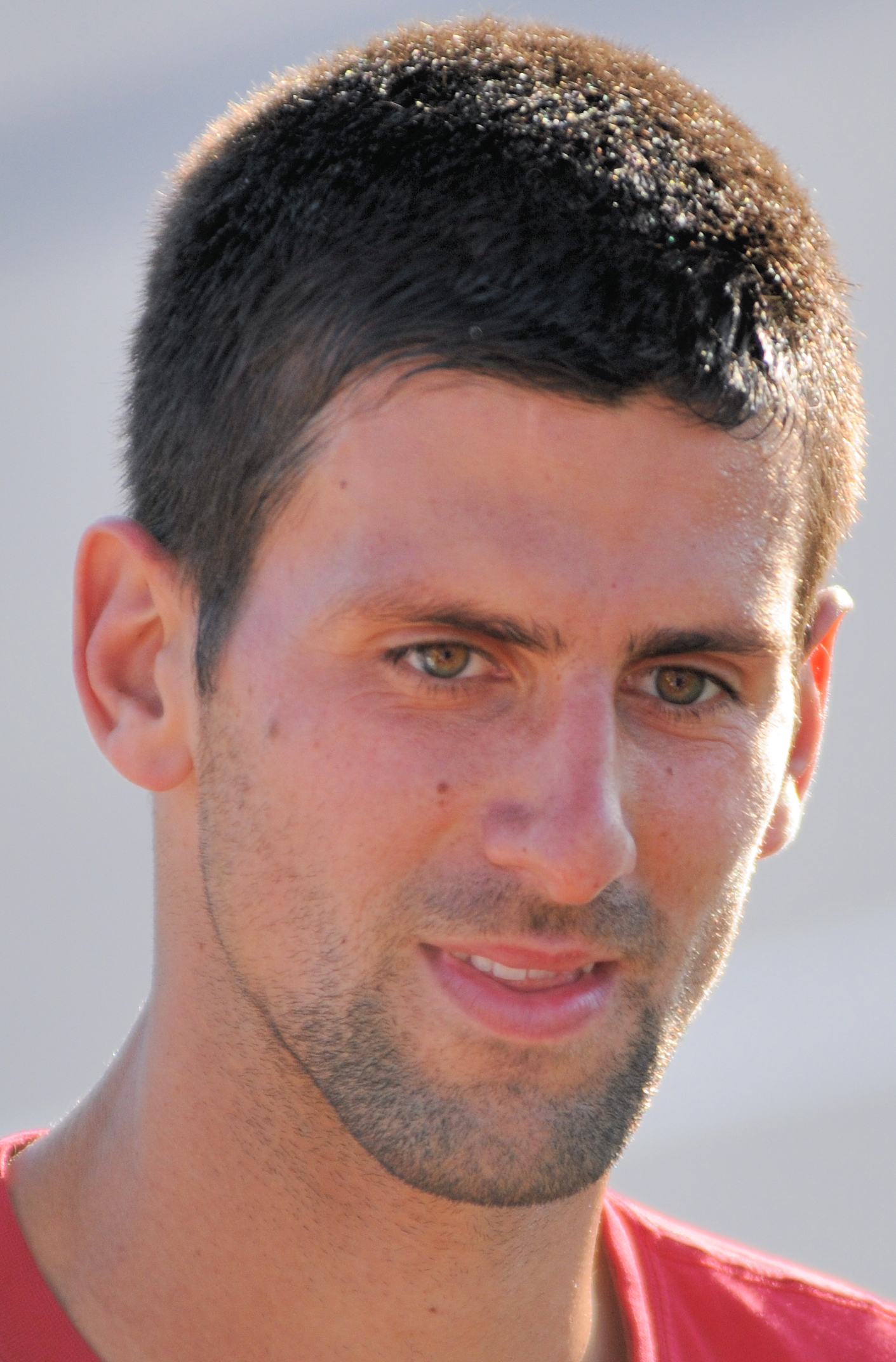
- A detail of Djokovic in Indian Wells
- Full name: Novak Djokovic
- Country: Serbia
- Calendar prize money: $12,803,739 (singles & doubles)

Singles
- Season record: 75–12 (86.21%)
- Calendar titles: 6
- Year-end ranking: No. 1
- Ranking change from previous year: Steady

Grand Slam & significant results
- Australian Open: W
- French Open: F
- Wimbledon: SF
- US Open: F
- Other tournaments
- Tour Finals: W
- Olympic Games: 4th

Doubles
- Season record: 0–2 (0%)
- Calendar titles: 0
- Current ranking: 542
- Ranking change from previous year: ▼302

Grand Slam doubles results
- Olympic Games: R1

The 2012 Novak Djokovic tennis season commenced on January 2 with the start of the 2012 ATP World Tour.

== Yearly summary ==
=== Grand Slam performances ===
==== Australian Open ====
In the semi-final, Djokovic beat Andy Murray in five sets (7–5 in the 5th set) after 4 hours and 50 minutes, coming back from a two sets to one deficit and fending off break points at 5-all in the 5th set. In the final, Djokovic beat Rafael Nadal in five sets, coming from a break down in the final set to win 7–5. At 5 hours and 53 minutes, the match was the longest final in Open Era Grand Slam history, as well as the longest match in Australian Open history, surpassing the 5 hour and 14 minute 2009 semi-final between Nadal and Fernando Verdasco.

==== Roland Garros ====
Djokovic reached his maiden French Open final by defeating Roger Federer, reaching the final of all four majors consecutively. Djokovic had the chance to become the first man since Rod Laver in 1969 to hold all four major titles at once, having won last year's Wimbledon and US Open titles as well as this year's Australian Open, but was beaten by Nadal in the final in four sets.

==== Wimbledon ====
Djokovic failed to defend his Wimbledon title, losing to Roger Federer in four sets in the semi-finals.

==== US Open ====
At the US Open, Djokovic reached his third consecutive final by beating fourth-seeded David Ferrer in a match suspended a day due to rain. He then lost the final to Murray in five sets.

== All matches ==
This table chronicles all the matches of Djokovic in 2012, including walkovers (W/O) which the ATP does not count as wins. They are marked ND for non-decision or no decision.

Key
W	F	SF	QF	#R	RR	Q#	P#	DNQ	A	Z#	PO	G	S	B	NMS	NTI	P	NH

(W) winner; (F) finalist; (SF) semifinalist; (QF) quarterfinalist; (#R) rounds 4, 3, 2, 1; (RR) round-robin stage; (Q#) qualification round; (P#) preliminary round; (DNQ) did not qualify; (A) absent; (Z#) Davis/Fed Cup Zonal Group (with number indication) or (PO) play-off; (G) gold, (S) silver or (B) bronze Olympic/Paralympic medal; (NMS) not a Masters tournament; (NTI) not a Tier I tournament; (P) postponed; (NH) not held; (SR) strike rate (events won / competed); (W–L) win–loss record.
To avoid confusion and double counting, these charts are updated at the conclusion of a tournament or when the player's participation has ended.

=== Singles matches ===
Tournament	#	Round	Opponent	Rank	Result	Score
Australian Open; Melbourne, Australia; Grand Slam tournament Hard, outdoor January 16, 2012
Australian Open; Melbourne, Australia; Grand Slam tournament Hard, outdoor January 16, 2012	1 / 506	1R	(Italy) Paolo Lorenzi	109	Win	6–2, 6–0, 6–0
Australian Open; Melbourne, Australia; Grand Slam tournament Hard, outdoor January 16, 2012	2 / 507	2R	(Colombia) Santiago Giraldo	56	Win	6–3, 6–2, 6–1
Australian Open; Melbourne, Australia; Grand Slam tournament Hard, outdoor January 16, 2012	3 / 508	3R	(France) Nicolas Mahut	81	Win	6–0, 6–1, 6–1
Australian Open; Melbourne, Australia; Grand Slam tournament Hard, outdoor January 16, 2012	4 / 509	4R	(Australia) Lleyton Hewitt	181	Win	6–1, 6–3, 4–6, 6–3
Australian Open; Melbourne, Australia; Grand Slam tournament Hard, outdoor January 16, 2012	5 / 510	QF	(Spain) David Ferrer	5	Win	6–4, 7–6^{(7–4)}, 6–1
Australian Open; Melbourne, Australia; Grand Slam tournament Hard, outdoor January 16, 2012	6 / 511	SF	(United Kingdom) Andy Murray	4	Win	6–3, 3–6, 6–7^{(4–7)}, 6–1, 7–5
Australian Open; Melbourne, Australia; Grand Slam tournament Hard, outdoor January 16, 2012	7 / 512	W	(Spain) Rafael Nadal	2	Win (1)	5–7, 6–4, 6–2, 6–7^{(5–7)}, 7–5
Dubai Tennis Championships; Dubai, UAE; ATP 500; Hard, outdoor February 27, 2012
Dubai Tennis Championships; Dubai, UAE; ATP 500; Hard, outdoor February 27, 2012	8 / 513	1R	(Germany) Cedrik-Marcel Stebe	72	Win	6–4, 6–2
Dubai Tennis Championships; Dubai, UAE; ATP 500; Hard, outdoor February 27, 2012	9 / 514	2R	(Ukraine) Sergiy Stakhovsky	74	Win	7–6^{(7–5)}, 6–3
Dubai Tennis Championships; Dubai, UAE; ATP 500; Hard, outdoor February 27, 2012	10 / 515	QF	(Serbia) Janko Tipsarević	9	Win	6–1, 7–6^{(8–6)}
Dubai Tennis Championships; Dubai, UAE; ATP 500; Hard, outdoor February 27, 2012	11 / 516	SF	(United Kingdom) Andy Murray	4	Loss	2–6, 5–7
BNP Paribas Open; Indian Wells, United States; ATP World Tour Masters 1000; Hard, outdoor March 5, 2012		1R	Bye			
BNP Paribas Open; Indian Wells, United States; ATP World Tour Masters 1000; Hard, outdoor March 5, 2012	12 / 517	2R	(Kazakhstan) Andrey Golubev	145	Win	6–3, 6–2
BNP Paribas Open; Indian Wells, United States; ATP World Tour Masters 1000; Hard, outdoor March 5, 2012	13 / 518	3R	(South Africa) Kevin Anderson	30	Win	6–2, 6–3
BNP Paribas Open; Indian Wells, United States; ATP World Tour Masters 1000; Hard, outdoor March 5, 2012	14 / 519	4R	(Spain) Pablo Andújar	45	Win	6–0, 6–7^{(5–7)}, 6–2
BNP Paribas Open; Indian Wells, United States; ATP World Tour Masters 1000; Hard, outdoor March 5, 2012	15 / 520	QF	(Spain) Nicolás Almagro	12	Win	6–3, 6–4
BNP Paribas Open; Indian Wells, United States; ATP World Tour Masters 1000; Hard, outdoor March 5, 2012	16 / 521	SF	(United States) John Isner	11	Loss	6–7^{(7–9)}, 6–3, 6–7^{(5–7)}
Sony Ericsson Open; Miami, United States; ATP World Tour Masters 1000; Hard, outdoor March 19, 2012		1R	Bye			
Sony Ericsson Open; Miami, United States; ATP World Tour Masters 1000; Hard, outdoor March 19, 2012	17 / 522	2R	(Cyprus) Marcos Baghdatis	42	Win	6–4, 6–4
Sony Ericsson Open; Miami, United States; ATP World Tour Masters 1000; Hard, outdoor March 19, 2012	18 / 523	3R	(Serbia) Viktor Troicki	27	Win	6–3, 6–4
Sony Ericsson Open; Miami, United States; ATP World Tour Masters 1000; Hard, outdoor March 19, 2012	19 / 524	4R	(France) Richard Gasquet	17	Win	7–5, 6–3
Sony Ericsson Open; Miami, United States; ATP World Tour Masters 1000; Hard, outdoor March 19, 2012	20 / 525	QF	(Spain) David Ferrer	5	Win	6–2, 7–6^{(7–1)}
Sony Ericsson Open; Miami, United States; ATP World Tour Masters 1000; Hard, outdoor March 19, 2012	21 / 526	SF	(Argentina) Juan Mónaco	21	Win	6–0, 7–6^{(7–5)}
Sony Ericsson Open; Miami, United States; ATP World Tour Masters 1000; Hard, outdoor March 19, 2012	22 / 527	W	(United Kingdom) Andy Murray	4	Win (2)	6–1, 7–6^{(7–4)}
Monte-Carlo Rolex Masters; Monte Carlo, Monaco; ATP World Tour Masters 1000; Clay, outdoor April 16, 2012		1R	Bye			
Monte-Carlo Rolex Masters; Monte Carlo, Monaco; ATP World Tour Masters 1000; Clay, outdoor April 16, 2012	23 / 528	2R	(Italy) Andreas Seppi	44	Win	6–1, 6–4
Monte-Carlo Rolex Masters; Monte Carlo, Monaco; ATP World Tour Masters 1000; Clay, outdoor April 16, 2012	24 / 529	3R	(Ukraine) Alexandr Dolgopolov	21	Win	2–6, 6–1, 6–4
Monte-Carlo Rolex Masters; Monte Carlo, Monaco; ATP World Tour Masters 1000; Clay, outdoor April 16, 2012	25 / 530	QF	(Netherlands) Robin Haase	55	Win	6–4, 6–2
Monte-Carlo Rolex Masters; Monte Carlo, Monaco; ATP World Tour Masters 1000; Clay, outdoor April 16, 2012	26 / 531	SF	(Czech Republic) Tomáš Berdych	7	Win	4–6, 6–3, 6–2
Monte-Carlo Rolex Masters; Monte Carlo, Monaco; ATP World Tour Masters 1000; Clay, outdoor April 16, 2012	27 / 532	F	(Spain) Rafael Nadal	2	Loss (1)	3–6, 1–6
Mutua Madrid Open; Madrid, Spain; ATP World Tour Masters 1000; Blue Clay, outdoor May 7, 2012		1R	Bye			
Mutua Madrid Open; Madrid, Spain; ATP World Tour Masters 1000; Blue Clay, outdoor May 7, 2012	28 / 533	2R	(Spain) Daniel Gimeno-Traver	137	Win	6–2, 2–6, 6–3
Mutua Madrid Open; Madrid, Spain; ATP World Tour Masters 1000; Blue Clay, outdoor May 7, 2012	29 / 534	3R	(Switzerland) Stanislas Wawrinka	21	Win	7–6^{(7–5)}, 6–4
Mutua Madrid Open; Madrid, Spain; ATP World Tour Masters 1000; Blue Clay, outdoor May 7, 2012	30 / 535	QF	(Serbia) Janko Tipsarević	8	Loss	6–7^{(2–7)}, 3–6
Internazionali BNL d'Italia; Rome, Italy; ATP World Tour Masters 1000; Clay, outdoor May 14, 2012		1R	Bye			
Internazionali BNL d'Italia; Rome, Italy; ATP World Tour Masters 1000; Clay, outdoor May 14, 2012	31 / 536	2R	(Australia) Bernard Tomic	32	Win	6–3, 6–3
Internazionali BNL d'Italia; Rome, Italy; ATP World Tour Masters 1000; Clay, outdoor May 14, 2012	32 / 537	3R	(Argentina) Juan Mónaco	15	Win	4–6, 6–2, 6–3
Internazionali BNL d'Italia; Rome, Italy; ATP World Tour Masters 1000; Clay, outdoor May 14, 2012	33 / 538	QF	(France) Jo-Wilfried Tsonga	5	Win	7–5, 6–1
Internazionali BNL d'Italia; Rome, Italy; ATP World Tour Masters 1000; Clay, outdoor May 14, 2012	34 / 539	SF	(Switzerland) Roger Federer	2	Win	6–2, 7–6^{(7–4)}
Internazionali BNL d'Italia; Rome, Italy; ATP World Tour Masters 1000; Clay, outdoor May 14, 2012	35 / 540	F	(Spain) Rafael Nadal	3	Loss (2)	5–7, 3–6
French Open; Paris, France; Grand Slam tournament Clay, outdoor May 28, 2012
French Open; Paris, France; Grand Slam tournament Clay, outdoor May 28, 2012	36 / 541	1R	(Italy) Potito Starace	97	Win	7–6^{(7–3)}, 6–3, 6–1
French Open; Paris, France; Grand Slam tournament Clay, outdoor May 28, 2012	37 / 542	2R	(Slovenia) Blaž Kavčič	99	Win	6–0, 6–4, 6–4
French Open; Paris, France; Grand Slam tournament Clay, outdoor May 28, 2012	38 / 543	3R	(France) Nicolas Devilder	286	Win	6–1, 6–2, 6–2
French Open; Paris, France; Grand Slam tournament Clay, outdoor May 28, 2012	39 / 544	4R	(Italy) Andreas Seppi	25	Win	4–6, 6–7^{(5–7)}, 6–3, 7–5, 6–3
French Open; Paris, France; Grand Slam tournament Clay, outdoor May 28, 2012	40 / 545	QF	(France) Jo-Wilfried Tsonga	5	Win	6–1, 5–7, 5–7, 7–6^{(8–6)}, 6–1
French Open; Paris, France; Grand Slam tournament Clay, outdoor May 28, 2012	41 / 546	SF	(Switzerland) Roger Federer	3	Win	6–4, 7–5, 6–3
French Open; Paris, France; Grand Slam tournament Clay, outdoor May 28, 2012	42 / 547	F	(Spain) Rafael Nadal	2	Loss (3)	4–6, 3–6, 6–2, 5–7
Wimbledon Championships; London, Great Britain; Grand Slam tournament Grass, outdoor June 25, 2012
Wimbledon Championships; London, Great Britain; Grand Slam tournament Grass, outdoor June 25, 2012	43 / 548	1R	(Spain) Juan Carlos Ferrero	38	Win	6–3, 6–3, 6–1
Wimbledon Championships; London, Great Britain; Grand Slam tournament Grass, outdoor June 25, 2012	44 / 549	2R	(United States) Ryan Harrison	48	Win	6–4, 6–4, 6–4
Wimbledon Championships; London, Great Britain; Grand Slam tournament Grass, outdoor June 25, 2012	45 / 550	3R	(Czech Republic) Radek Štěpánek	27	Win	4–6, 6–2, 6–2, 6–2
Wimbledon Championships; London, Great Britain; Grand Slam tournament Grass, outdoor June 25, 2012	46 / 551	4R	(Serbia) Viktor Troicki	34	Win	6–3, 6–1, 6–3
Wimbledon Championships; London, Great Britain; Grand Slam tournament Grass, outdoor June 25, 2012	47 / 552	QF	(Germany) Florian Mayer	29	Win	6–4, 6–1, 6–4
Wimbledon Championships; London, Great Britain; Grand Slam tournament Grass, outdoor June 25, 2012	48 / 553	SF	(Switzerland) Roger Federer	3	Loss	3–6, 6–3, 4–6, 3–6
2012 Summer Olympics; London, Great Britain; Olympic Games; Grass, outdoor July 28, 2012
2012 Summer Olympics; London, Great Britain; Olympic Games; Grass, outdoor July 28, 2012	49 / 554	1R	(Italy) Fabio Fognini	66	Win	6–7^{(7–9)}, 6–2, 6–2
2012 Summer Olympics; London, Great Britain; Olympic Games; Grass, outdoor July 28, 2012	50 / 555	2R	(United States) Andy Roddick	21	Win	6–2, 6–1
2012 Summer Olympics; London, Great Britain; Olympic Games; Grass, outdoor July 28, 2012	51 / 556	3R	(Australia) Lleyton Hewitt	159	Win	4–6, 7–5, 6–1
2012 Summer Olympics; London, Great Britain; Olympic Games; Grass, outdoor July 28, 2012	52 / 557	QF	(France) Jo-Wilfried Tsonga	6	Win	6–1, 7–5
2012 Summer Olympics; London, Great Britain; Olympic Games; Grass, outdoor July 28, 2012	53 / 558	SF	(United Kingdom) Andy Murray	4	Loss	5–7, 5–7
2012 Summer Olympics; London, Great Britain; Olympic Games; Grass, outdoor July 28, 2012	54 / 559	SF-B	(Argentina) Juan Martín del Potro	9	Loss	5–7, 4–6
Rogers Cup; Toronto, Canada; ATP World Tour Masters 1000; Hard, outdoor August 6, 2012		1R	Bye			
Rogers Cup; Toronto, Canada; ATP World Tour Masters 1000; Hard, outdoor August 6, 2012	55 / 560	2R	(Australia) Bernard Tomic	49	Win	6–2, 6–3
Rogers Cup; Toronto, Canada; ATP World Tour Masters 1000; Hard, outdoor August 6, 2012	56 / 561	3R	(United States) Sam Querrey	35	Win	6–4, 6–4
Rogers Cup; Toronto, Canada; ATP World Tour Masters 1000; Hard, outdoor August 6, 2012	57 / 562	QF	(Germany) Tommy Haas	25	Win	6–3, 3–6, 6–3
Rogers Cup; Toronto, Canada; ATP World Tour Masters 1000; Hard, outdoor August 6, 2012	58 / 563	SF	(Serbia) Janko Tipsarević	9	Win	6–4, 6–1
Rogers Cup; Toronto, Canada; ATP World Tour Masters 1000; Hard, outdoor August 6, 2012	59 / 564	W	(France) Richard Gasquet	21	Win (3)	6–3, 6–2
Western & Southern Open; Cincinnati, USA; ATP World Tour Masters 1000; Hard, outdoor August 12, 2012		1R	Bye			
Western & Southern Open; Cincinnati, USA; ATP World Tour Masters 1000; Hard, outdoor August 12, 2012	60 / 565	2R	(Italy) Andreas Seppi	27	Win	7–6^{(7–4)}, 6–2
Western & Southern Open; Cincinnati, USA; ATP World Tour Masters 1000; Hard, outdoor August 12, 2012	61 / 566	3R	(Russia) Nikolay Davydenko	50	Win	6–0, Ret.
Western & Southern Open; Cincinnati, USA; ATP World Tour Masters 1000; Hard, outdoor August 12, 2012	62 / 567	QF	(Croatia) Marin Čilić	15	Win	6–3, 6–2
Western & Southern Open; Cincinnati, USA; ATP World Tour Masters 1000; Hard, outdoor August 12, 2012	63 / 568	SF	(Argentina) Juan Martín del Potro	9	Win	6–3, 6–2
Western & Southern Open; Cincinnati, USA; ATP World Tour Masters 1000; Hard, outdoor August 12, 2012	64 / 569	F	(Switzerland) Roger Federer	1	Loss (4)	0–6, 6–7^{(7–9)}
US Open; New York City, United States; Grand Slam tournament Hard, outdoor August 27, 2012
US Open; New York City, United States; Grand Slam tournament Hard, outdoor August 27, 2012	65 / 570	1R	(Italy) Paolo Lorenzi	69	Win	6–1, 6–0, 6–1
US Open; New York City, United States; Grand Slam tournament Hard, outdoor August 27, 2012	66 / 571	2R	(Brazil) Rogério Dutra Silva	112	Win	6–2, 6–1, 6–2
US Open; New York City, United States; Grand Slam tournament Hard, outdoor August 27, 2012	67 / 572	3R	(France) Julien Benneteau	35	Win	6–3, 6–2, 6–2
US Open; New York City, United States; Grand Slam tournament Hard, outdoor August 27, 2012	68 / 573	4R	(Switzerland) Stanislas Wawrinka	19	Win	6–4, 6–1, 3–1 Ret.
US Open; New York City, United States; Grand Slam tournament Hard, outdoor August 27, 2012	69 / 574	QF	(Argentina) Juan Martín del Potro	8	Win	6–2, 7–6^{(7–3)}, 6–4
US Open; New York City, United States; Grand Slam tournament Hard, outdoor August 27, 2012	70 / 575	SF	(Spain) David Ferrer	5	Win	2–6, 6–1, 6–4, 6–2
US Open; New York City, United States; Grand Slam tournament Hard, outdoor August 27, 2012	71 / 576	F	(United Kingdom) Andy Murray	4	Loss (5)	6–7^{(10–12)}, 5–7, 6–2, 6–3, 2–6
China Open; Beijing, China; ATP 500; Hard, outdoor October 1, 2012
China Open; Beijing, China; ATP 500; Hard, outdoor October 1, 2012	72 / 577	1R	(Germany) Michael Berrer	123	Win	6–1, 6–7^{(3–7)}, 6–2
China Open; Beijing, China; ATP 500; Hard, outdoor October 1, 2012	73 / 578	2R	(Argentina) Carlos Berlocq	50	Win	6–1, 6–3
China Open; Beijing, China; ATP 500; Hard, outdoor October 1, 2012	74 / 579	QF	(Austria) Jürgen Melzer	37	Win	6–1, 6–2
China Open; Beijing, China; ATP 500; Hard, outdoor October 1, 2012	75 / 580	SF	(Germany) Florian Mayer	29	Win	6–1, 6–4
China Open; Beijing, China; ATP 500; Hard, outdoor October 1, 2012	76 / 581	W	(France) Jo-Wilfried Tsonga	7	Win (4)	7–6^{(7–4)}, 6–2
Shanghai Masters; Shanghai, China; ATP World Tour Masters 1000; Hard, outdoor October 8, 2012		1R	Bye			
Shanghai Masters; Shanghai, China; ATP World Tour Masters 1000; Hard, outdoor October 8, 2012	77 / 582	2R	(Bulgaria) Grigor Dimitrov	56	Win	6–3, 6–2
Shanghai Masters; Shanghai, China; ATP World Tour Masters 1000; Hard, outdoor October 8, 2012	78 / 583	3R	(Spain) Feliciano López	29	Win	6–3, 6–3
Shanghai Masters; Shanghai, China; ATP World Tour Masters 1000; Hard, outdoor October 8, 2012	79 / 584	QF	(Germany) Tommy Haas	21	Win	6–3, 6–3
Shanghai Masters; Shanghai, China; ATP World Tour Masters 1000; Hard, outdoor October 8, 2012	80 / 585	SF	(Czech Republic) Tomáš Berdych	7	Win	6–3, 6–4
Shanghai Masters; Shanghai, China; ATP World Tour Masters 1000; Hard, outdoor October 8, 2012	81 / 586	W	(United Kingdom) Andy Murray	3	Win (5)	5–7, 7–6^{(13–11)}, 6–3
Paribas Masters; Paris, France; ATP World Tour Masters 1000; Hard, indoor October 29, 2012		1R	Bye			
Paribas Masters; Paris, France; ATP World Tour Masters 1000; Hard, indoor October 29, 2012	82 / 587	2R	(United States) Sam Querrey	24	Loss	6–0, 6–7^{(5–7)}, 4–6
ATP World Tour Finals; London, United Kingdom; ATP World Tour Finals (1500); Hard, indoor November 5, 2012	83 / 588	RR	(France) Jo-Wilfried Tsonga	8	Win	7–6^{(7–4)}, 6–3
ATP World Tour Finals; London, United Kingdom; ATP World Tour Finals (1500); Hard, indoor November 5, 2012	84 / 589	RR	(United Kingdom) Andy Murray	3	Win	4–6, 6–3, 7–5
ATP World Tour Finals; London, United Kingdom; ATP World Tour Finals (1500); Hard, indoor November 5, 2012	85 / 590	RR	(Czech Republic) Tomáš Berdych	6	Win	6–2, 7–6^{(8–6)}
ATP World Tour Finals; London, United Kingdom; ATP World Tour Finals (1500); Hard, indoor November 5, 2012	86 / 591	SF	(Argentina) Juan Martín del Potro	7	Win	4–6, 6–3, 6–2
ATP World Tour Finals; London, United Kingdom; ATP World Tour Finals (1500); Hard, indoor November 5, 2012	87 / 592	W	(Switzerland) Roger Federer	2	Win (6)	7–6^{(8–6)}, 7–5

- Source

=== Doubles matches ===
Tournament	Match	Round	Opponents	Rank	Team rank	Result	Score
BNP Paribas Open; Indian Wells, California, USA; ATP World Tour Masters 1000; Hard, outdoor March 8, 2012; Partner: (Serbia) Victor Troicki
BNP Paribas Open; Indian Wells, California, USA; ATP World Tour Masters 1000; Hard, outdoor March 8, 2012; Partner: (Serbia) Victor Troicki	1 / 75	1R	(Spain) Marcel Granollers (Spain) Feliciano López	42; 337	–	Loss	5–7, 5–7
2012 Summer Olympics; London, Great Britain; Olympic Games; Grass, outdoor July 25, 2012; Partner: (Serbia) Victor Troicki
2012 Summer Olympics; London, Great Britain; Olympic Games; Grass, outdoor July 25, 2012; Partner: (Serbia) Victor Troicki	2 / 76	1R	(Sweden) Johan Brunström (Sweden) Robert Lindstedt	72; 10	–	Loss	6–7^{(8–10)}, 3–6

- Source

=== Exhibitions ===
==== Mubadala World Tennis Championship ====
Tournament	Round	Opponent	Result	Score
Mubadala World Tennis Championship; Abu Dhabi, United Arab Emirates; Exhibition; Hard, outdoor 29–31 December 2011
Mubadala World Tennis Championship; Abu Dhabi, United Arab Emirates; Exhibition; Hard, outdoor 29–31 December 2011	QF	(France) Gaël Monfils	Win	6–2, 4–6, 6–2
Mubadala World Tennis Championship; Abu Dhabi, United Arab Emirates; Exhibition; Hard, outdoor 29–31 December 2011	SF	(Switzerland) Roger Federer	Win	6–2, 6–1
Mubadala World Tennis Championship; Abu Dhabi, United Arab Emirates; Exhibition; Hard, outdoor 29–31 December 2011	W	(Spain) David Ferrer	Win	6–2, 6–1

== Tournament schedule ==
=== Singles schedule ===
Date	Tournament	City	Category	Surface	2011 result	2011 points	2012 points	Outcome
14.01.2012–29.01.2012	Australian Open	Melbourne	Grand Slam	Hard	W	2000	2000	Winner (def. Rafael Nadal, 5–7, 6–4, 6–2, 6–7^{(5–7)}, 7–5)
27.02.2012–05.03.2012	Dubai Tennis Championships	Dubai	ATP World Tour 500	Hard	W	500	180	Semifinals (lost to Andy Murray, 2–6, 5–7)
06.03.2012–19.03.2012	BNP Paribas Open	Indian Wells	ATP Masters 1000	Hard	W	1000	360	Semifinals (lost to John Isner, 6–7^{(7–9)}, 6–3, 6–7^{(5–7)})
20.03.2012–01.04.2012	Sony Ericsson Open	Miami	ATP Masters 1000	Hard	W	1000	1000	Winner (def. Andy Murray, 6–1, 7–6^{(7–4)})
16.04.2012–23.04.2012	Monte-Carlo Rolex Masters	France	ATP Masters 1000	Clay	DNS	0	600	Final (lost to Rafael Nadal 3–6, 1–6)
30.04.2012–06.05.2012	Serbia Open	Belgrade	ATP World Tour 250	Clay	W	250	0	Withdrew
07.05.2012–13.05.2012	Mutua Madrid Open	Madrid	ATP Masters 1000	Clay	W	1000	180	Quarterfinals (lost to Janko Tipsarević, 6–7^{(2–7)}, 3–6)
14.05.2012–20.05.2012	Internazionali BNL d'Italia	Rome	ATP Masters 1000	Clay	W	1000	600	Final (lost to Rafael Nadal 5–7, 3–6)
28.05.2012–10.06.2012	French Open	Paris	Grand Slam	Clay	SF	720	1200	Final (lost to Rafael Nadal 4–6, 3–6, 6–2, 5–7)
25.06.2012–08.07.2012	Wimbledon	London	Grand Slam	Grass	W	2000	720	Semifinals (lost to Roger Federer 3–6, 6–3, 4–6, 3–6)
27.07.2012–05.08.2012	Summer Olympics	London	Olympic Games	Grass	N/A	N/A	270	Bronze medal match (lost to JM del Potro 5–7, 4–6)
06.08.2012–12.08.2012	Rogers Cup	Toronto	ATP Masters 1000	Hard	W	1000	1000	Winner (def. Richard Gasquet, 6–3, 6–2)
13.08.2012–19.08.2012	Western & Southern Open	Cincinnati	ATP Masters 1000	Hard	F	600	600	Final (lost to Roger Federer 0–6, 6–7^{(7–9)})
27.08.2012–09.09.2012	US Open	New York	Grand Slam	Hard	W	2000	1200	Final (lost to Andy Murray, 6–7^{(10–12)}, 5–7, 6–2, 6–3, 2–6)
01.10.2012–07.10.2012	China Open	Beijing	ATP World Tour 500	Hard	DNS	0	500	Winner (def. Jo-Wilfried Tsonga, 7–6^{(7–4)}, 6–2)
08.10.2012–14.10.2012	Shanghai Rolex Masters	Shanghai	ATP Masters 1000	Hard	DNS	0	1000	Winner (def. Andy Murray, 5–7, 7–6^{(13–11)}, 6–3)
22.10.2012–28.10.2012	Swiss Indoors	Basel	ATP World Tour 500	Hard (i)	SF	180	0	Withdrew
29.10.2012–04.11.2012	BNP Paribas Masters	Paris	ATP Masters 1000	Hard (i)	QF	180	10	Second round (lost to Sam Querrey, 6–0, 6–7^{(5–7)}, 4–6)
05.11.2012–11.11.2012	ATP World Tour Finals	London	ATP World Tour Finals	Hard (i)	RR	200	1500	Winner (def. Roger Federer, 7–6^{(8–6)}, 7–5)
Total year-end points						13630	12920	▼710 difference

- 2011 source
- 2012 source

=== Doubles schedule ===
Date	Tournament	City	Category	Surface	2011 result	2011 points	2012 points	Outcome
27.02.2012–05.03.2012	Dubai Tennis Championships	Dubai	ATP World Tour 500	Hard	1R	(0)	0	Withdrew
06.03.2012–19.03.2012	BNP Paribas Open	Indian Wells	ATP Masters 1000	Hard	QF	180	(0)	First round (lost to López/Granollers, 5–7, 5–7)
20.03.2012–01.04.2012	Sony Ericsson Open	Miami	ATP Masters 1000	Hard	1R	(0)	0	Withdrew
27.07.2012–05.08.2012	Summer Olympics	London	Olympic Games	Grass	N/A	N/A	(0)	First round (lost to Brunström/Lindstedt, 6–7^{(8–10)}, 3–6)
06.08.2012–12.08.2012	Rogers Cup	Toronto	ATP Masters 1000	Hard	2R	90	0	Withdrew
Total year-end points						270	0	▼270 difference

- 2011 source
- 2012 source

== Yearly records ==
=== Statistics ===
The table below summarizes the worldwide ranking of Novak Djokovic in different sectors of the game according to the RICOH ATP matchfacts as of November 12, 2012.

**Game feature**	**YTD**		**2011**	**Season best in one match**
**Game feature**	% or no.	Ranking	**2011**	% or no.	Opponent	Tournament	source
Service game:
Aces	512	14	343 ▲169	16	Lleyton Hewitt	Olympics
1st serve percentage	64%	16	65% ▼1	79%	Paolo Lorenzi	US Open
1st serve points won	75%	14	74% ▲1	93%	Feliciano López	Shanghai Masters
2nd serve points won	56%	5	56%	80%	Richard Gasquet	Rogers Cup
Service games won	87%	6	86% ▲1	100%	Andy Roddick	Olympics
Break points saved	66%	11	65% ▲1	100%	Nicolas Mahut; Kevin Anderson; Pablo Andújar; Cedrik-Marcel Stebe; Marcos Baghdatis
Return of service:
Points won returning 1st serve	35%	2	36% ▼1	53%	Paolo Lorenzi	US Open
Points won returning 2nd serve	56%	2	58% ▼2	93%	Paolo Lorenzi	Australian Open
Return games won	35%	2	39% ▼4	90%	Paolo Lorenzi	Australian Open
Break points converted	46%	2	48% ▼2	100%	Andy Roddick	Olympics

=== Head-to-head matchups ===
Novak Djokovic has a 24–10 record against the top 10, a 33–2 record against the top 50 and an 18–0 record against other players outside the top 50.

Ordered by number of wins (Bolded number marks a top 10 player at the time of match, Italic means top 50)

- (France) **Jo-Wilfried Tsonga** 5–0
- (United Kingdom) **Andy Murray** 4–3
- (Czech Republic) **Tomáš Berdych** 3–0
- (Spain) **David Ferrer** 3–0
- (Italy) Andreas Seppi 3–0
- (Argentina) **Juan Martín del Potro** 3–1
- (Switzerland) **Roger Federer** 3–2
- (France) Richard Gasquet 2–0
- (Germany) Tommy Haas 2–0
- (Australia) Lleyton Hewitt 2–0
- (Italy) Paolo Lorenzi 2–0
- (Germany) Florian Mayer 2–0
- (Argentina) Juan Mónaco 2–0
- (Australia) Bernard Tomic 2–0
- (Serbia) Viktor Troicki 2–0
- (Switzerland) Stanislas Wawrinka 2–0
- (Serbia) **Janko Tipsarević** 2–1
- (South Africa) Kevin Anderson 1–0
- (Spain) Nicolás Almagro 1–0
- (Spain) Pablo Andújar 1–0
- (Cyprus) Marcos Baghdatis 1–0
- (France) Julien Benneteau 1–0
- (Argentina) Carlos Berlocq 1–0
- (Germany) Michael Berrer 1–0
- (Croatia) Marin Čilić 1–0
- (Russia) Nikolay Davydenko 1–0
- (France) Nicolas Devilder 1–0
- (Bulgaria) Grigor Dimitrov 1–0
- (Ukraine) Alexandr Dolgopolov 1–0
- (Brazil) Rogério Dutra da Silva 1–0
- (Spain) Juan Carlos Ferrero 1–0
- (Italy) Fabio Fognini 1–0
- (Spain) Daniel Gimeno-Traver 1–0
- (Colombia) Santiago Giraldo 1–0
- (Kazakhstan) Andrey Golubev 1–0
- (Netherlands) Robin Haase 1–0
- (United States) Ryan Harrison 1–0
- (Slovenia) Blaž Kavčič 1–0
- (Spain) Feliciano López 1–0
- (France) Nicolas Mahut 1–0
- (Austria) Jürgen Melzer 1–0
- (United States) Andy Roddick 1–0
- (Ukraine) Sergiy Stakhovsky 1–0
- (Italy) Potito Starace 1–0
- (Germany) Cedrik-Marcel Stebe 1–0
- (Czech Republic) Radek Štěpánek 1–0
- (United States) Sam Querrey 1–1
- (Spain) **Rafael Nadal** 1–3
- (United States) John Isner 0–1

=== Finals ===
==== Singles: 11 (6–5) ====
Category
Grand Slam (1–2)
ATP World Tour Finals (1–0)
ATP World Tour Masters 1000 (3–3)
ATP World Tour 500 (1–0)
ATP World Tour 250 (0–0)

Titles by surface
Hard (6–2)
Clay (0–3)
Grass (0–0)

Titles by conditions
Outdoors (5–5)
Indoors (1–0)

Outcome	No.	Date	Tournament	Surface	Opponent in the final	Score in the final
Winner	29.	January 29, 2012	Australian Open, Melbourne (3)	Hard	(Spain) Rafael Nadal	5–7, 6–4, 6–2, 6–7^{(5–7)}, 7–5
Winner	30.	April 1, 2012	Sony Ericsson Open, Miami (3)	Hard	(United Kingdom) Andy Murray	6–1, 7–6^{(7–4)}
Runner-up	15.	April 22, 2012	Monte-Carlo Rolex Masters, Monte Carlo (2)	Clay	(Spain) Rafael Nadal	3–6, 1–6
Runner-up	16.	May 21, 2012	Internazionali BNL d'Italia, Rome (2)	Clay	(Spain) Rafael Nadal	5–7, 3–6
Runner-up	17.	June 11, 2012	French Open, Paris, France	Clay	(Spain) Rafael Nadal	4–6, 3–6, 6–2, 5–7
Winner	31.	August 13, 2012	Rogers Cup, Toronto (3)	Hard	(France) Richard Gasquet	6–3, 6–2
Runner-up	18.	August 19, 2012	Western & Southern Open, Cincinnati (4)	Hard	(Switzerland) Roger Federer	0–6, 6–7^{(7–9)}
Runner-up	19.	September 10, 2012	US Open, New York City (3)	Hard	(United Kingdom) Andy Murray	6–7^{(10–12)}, 5–7, 6–2, 6–3, 2–6
Winner	32.	October 7, 2012	China Open, Beijing (3)	Hard	(France) Jo-Wilfried Tsonga	7–6^{(7–4)}, 6–2
Winner	33.	October 14, 2012	Shanghai Rolex Masters, Shanghai	Hard	(United Kingdom) Andy Murray	5–7, 7–6^{(13–11)}, 6–3
Winner	34.	November 12, 2012	ATP World Tour Finals, London (2)	Hard	(Switzerland) Roger Federer	7–6^{(8–6)}, 7–5

=== Earnings ===
- **Bold** font denotes tournament win

#	Venue	Prize Money	Year-to-date
1	**Australian Open**	**$2,372,910**	$2,372,910
2	Dubai Tennis Championships	$87,380	$2,460,290
3	BNP Paribas Open	$203,816	$2,664,106
4	**Sony Ericsson Open**	**$659,775**	$3,323,881
5	Monte-Carlo Rolex Masters	$295,008	$3,618,889
6	Mutua Madrid Open	$96,093	$3,714,982
7	Internazionali BNL d'Italia	$291,420	$4,006,402
8	French Open	$782,938	$4,789,340
9	Wimbledon Championships	$447,925	$5,237,265
10	**Rogers Cup**	**$522,550**	$5,759,815
11	Western & Southern Open	$262,610	$6,022,425
12	US Open	$950,000	$6,972,425
13	**China Open**	**$530,570**	$7,502,995
14	**Shanghai Rolex Masters**	**$669,450**	$8,172,445
15	BNP Paribas Masters	$21,294	$8,193,739
16	**ATP World Tour Finals**	**$1,760,000**	$9,953,739
US Open Series bonus		$500,000	$10,453,739
ATP Bonus Pool		$2,346,184	$12,799,923
Doubles		$3,816	$12,803,739
as of November 13, 2012

=== Awards and nominations ===
- Laureus World Sports Award for Sportsman of the Year
- ATP Player of the Year
- ITF World Champion
- Best Male Tennis Player ESPY Award
- AIPS Europe Athletes of the Year
- US Open Series Champion
- Arthur Ashe Humanitarian of the Year

== See also ==
- 2012 ATP World Tour
- 2012 Roger Federer tennis season
- 2012 Rafael Nadal tennis season
- 2012 Andy Murray tennis season
