= 2012 Andy Murray tennis season =

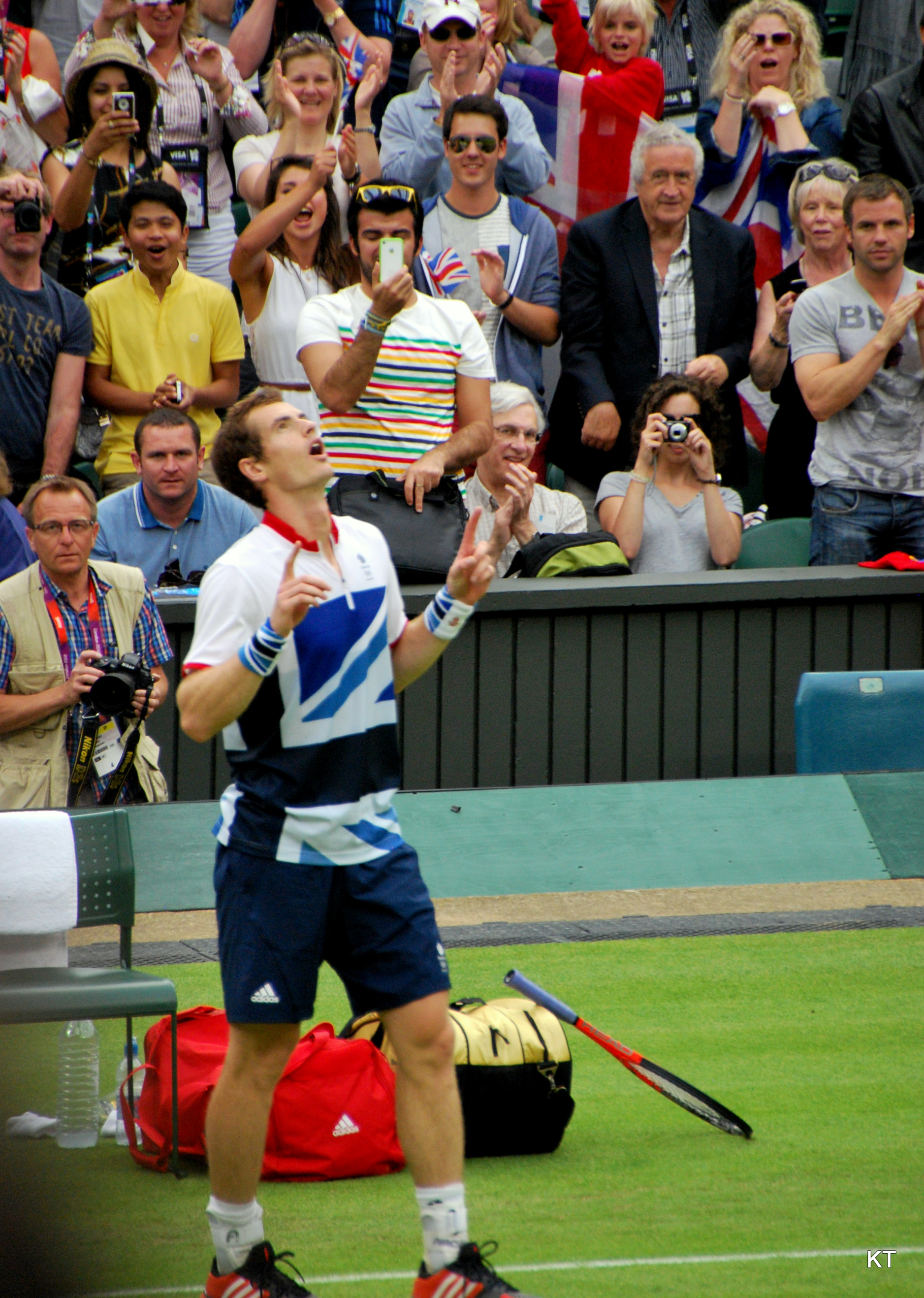
- Andy Murray's 2012 season included an Olympic Gold Medal
- Full name: Andy Murray
- Country: Great Britain
- Calendar prize money: $5,706,153 (singles & doubles)

Singles
- Season record: 56–16 (77.77%)
- Calendar titles: 3
- Year-end ranking: No. 3
- Ranking change from previous year: ▲1

Grand Slam & significant results
- Australian Open: SF
- French Open: QF
- Wimbledon: F
- US Open: W
- Other tournaments
- Tour Finals: SF
- Olympic Games: W

Doubles
- Season record: 5–6 (45.45%)
- Calendar titles: 0
- Year-end ranking: No. 181
- Ranking change from previous year: ▼113

Grand Slam doubles results
- Other Doubles tournaments
- Olympic Games: 1R

Mixed doubles
- Season record: 3–1 (75.00%)
- Calendar titles: 0

Grand Slam mixed doubles results
- Other Mixed Doubles tournaments
- Olympic Games: F
- Last updated on: 3 February 2013.

The 2012 Andy Murray tennis season officially began at the Brisbane International. After overcoming slow starts in his first two matches, Murray made it to the final, defeating Alexandr Dolgopolov in straight sets to claim his 22nd career title. Murray then made it to the final of the Dubai Tennis Championships defeating Novak Djokovic in the semifinals, only to lose to Roger Federer in the final. After a loss in his opening match in Indian Wells, Murray made it to the final of the Miami Masters for the second time, where he was ultimately defeated by Djokovic in the final. Murray's clay court season was hampered by a back injury, meaning he didn't make it beyond the quarterfinals of any event, ultimately losing to David Ferrer in the last eight at Roland Garros. During the summer, Murray made it to his first ever final at Wimbledon, in which he was ultimately defeated by Federer in four sets. Murray however made his most impressive of comebacks from a Grand Slam final defeat, at the London Olympics four weeks later, staged once again at the All-England Club. Murray made it through to the final with ease, including a straight sets defeat of Novak Djokovic, to set up a rematch with Federer, once again on Wimbledon Centre Court. In a complete reversal of fortunes, Murray defeated Federer over five sets for the first time, handing the Swiss his worst defeat ever on grass to take the gold medal in straight sets, for the loss of just 7 games.

It was during the American hardcourt season that Murray recorded his most significant victory. After retiring early in Toronto, and suffering a third round defeat by Milos Raonic in Cincinnati, Murray made his way to New York for the 2012 US Open at Flushing Meadows. The scot made it to his second consecutive Grand Slam final, where once again he faced Novak Djokovic, the fifth time the two had met in 2012. After losing a two sets to love lead, Murray regained his prior momentum to take the deciding set, and clinch his first ever Grand Slam victory. In winning the US Open, Murray became the first British man to win a Grand Slam title in 76 years, the last winner being Fred Perry in 1936. His victory at Flushing Meadows also set several records for Murray, the final featured the longest ever tiebreak in a US Open final (12-10 was the score in the first set tiebreak), and the match itself was the joint longest in history (tied with the 1988 final, in which Murray's coach Ivan Lendl competed). In addition, Murray also became the first man ever to win Olympic Gold and the US Open in the same calendar year.

== All matches ==
This table chronicles all the matches of Murray in 2012, including walkovers (W/O) which the ATP does not count as wins. They are marked ND for non-decision or no decision.

Key
W	F	SF	QF	#R	RR	Q#	P#	DNQ	A	Z#	PO	G	S	B	NMS	NTI	P	NH

(W) winner; (F) finalist; (SF) semifinalist; (QF) quarterfinalist; (#R) rounds 4, 3, 2, 1; (RR) round-robin stage; (Q#) qualification round; (P#) preliminary round; (DNQ) did not qualify; (A) absent; (Z#) Davis/Fed Cup Zonal Group (with number indication) or (PO) play-off; (G) gold, (S) silver or (B) bronze Olympic/Paralympic medal; (NMS) not a Masters tournament; (NTI) not a Tier I tournament; (P) postponed; (NH) not held; (SR) strike rate (events won / competed); (W–L) win–loss record.
To avoid confusion and double counting, these charts are updated at the conclusion of a tournament or when the player's participation has ended.

=== Singles matches ===
Tournament	Match	Round	Opponent (seed or key)	Rank	Result	Score
Brisbane International; Brisbane, Australia; ATP 250; Hard, outdoor 3 – 8 January 2012
Brisbane International; Brisbane, Australia; ATP 250; Hard, outdoor 3 – 8 January 2012	1	1R	(Kazakhstan) Mikhail Kukushkin	91	Win	5–7, 6–3, 6–2
Brisbane International; Brisbane, Australia; ATP 250; Hard, outdoor 3 – 8 January 2012	2	2R	(Luxembourg) Gilles Müller	54	Win	6–4, 6–7^{(4–7)}, 6–0
Brisbane International; Brisbane, Australia; ATP 250; Hard, outdoor 3 – 8 January 2012	3	QF	(Cyprus) Marcos Baghdatis	43	Win	6–2, 6–2
Brisbane International; Brisbane, Australia; ATP 250; Hard, outdoor 3 – 8 January 2012	4	SF	(Australia) Bernard Tomic (8)	42	Win	6–3, 6–2
Brisbane International; Brisbane, Australia; ATP 250; Hard, outdoor 3 – 8 January 2012	5	W	(Ukraine) Alexandr Dolgopolov (3)	19	Win (1)	6–1, 6–3
Australian Open; Melbourne, Australia; Grand Slam tournament Hard, outdoor 16 – 29 January 2012
Australian Open; Melbourne, Australia; Grand Slam tournament Hard, outdoor 16 – 29 January 2012	6	1R	(United States) Ryan Harrison	77	Win	4–6, 6–3, 6–4, 6–2
Australian Open; Melbourne, Australia; Grand Slam tournament Hard, outdoor 16 – 29 January 2012	7	2R	(France) Édouard Roger-Vasselin	101	Win	6–1, 6–4, 6–4
Australian Open; Melbourne, Australia; Grand Slam tournament Hard, outdoor 16 – 29 January 2012	8	3R	(France) Michaël Llodra	46	Win	6–4, 6–2, 6–0
Australian Open; Melbourne, Australia; Grand Slam tournament Hard, outdoor 16 – 29 January 2012	9	4R	(Kazakhstan) Mikhail Kukushkin	92	Win	6–1, 6–1, 1–0 ret.
Australian Open; Melbourne, Australia; Grand Slam tournament Hard, outdoor 16 – 29 January 2012	10	QF	(Japan) Kei Nishikori (24)	26	Win	6–3, 6–3, 6–1
Australian Open; Melbourne, Australia; Grand Slam tournament Hard, outdoor 16 – 29 January 2012	11	SF	(Serbia) Novak Djokovic (1)	1	Loss	3–6, 6–3, 7–6^{(7–4)}, 1–6, 5–7
Dubai Tennis Championships; Dubai, United Arab Emirates; ATP 500; Hard, outdoor 27 February – 3 March 2012
Dubai Tennis Championships; Dubai, United Arab Emirates; ATP 500; Hard, outdoor 27 February – 3 March 2012	12	1R	(Germany) Michael Berrer (Q)	116	Win	6–3, 4–6, 6–4
Dubai Tennis Championships; Dubai, United Arab Emirates; ATP 500; Hard, outdoor 27 February – 3 March 2012	13	2R	(Switzerland) Marco Chiudinelli (Q)	186	Win	6–3, 6–4
Dubai Tennis Championships; Dubai, United Arab Emirates; ATP 500; Hard, outdoor 27 February – 3 March 2012	14	QF	(Czech Republic) Tomáš Berdych (5)	43	Win	6–3, 7–5
Dubai Tennis Championships; Dubai, United Arab Emirates; ATP 500; Hard, outdoor 27 February – 3 March 2012	15	SF	(Serbia) Novak Djokovic (1)	1	Win	6–2, 7–5
Dubai Tennis Championships; Dubai, United Arab Emirates; ATP 500; Hard, outdoor 27 February – 3 March 2012	16	F	(Switzerland) Roger Federer (2)	3	Loss (1)	5–7, 4–6
Indian Wells; Indian Wells, United States; ATP 1000; Hard, outdoor 5 – 18 March 2012
Indian Wells; Indian Wells, United States; ATP 1000; Hard, outdoor 5 – 18 March 2012	–	1R	Bye			
Indian Wells; Indian Wells, United States; ATP 1000; Hard, outdoor 5 – 18 March 2012	17	2R	(Spain) Guillermo García-López	92	Loss	4–6, 2–6
Miami Open; Miami, United States; ATP 1000; Hard, outdoor 19 March – 1 April 2012
Miami Open; Miami, United States; ATP 1000; Hard, outdoor 19 March – 1 April 2012	–	1R	Bye			
Miami Open; Miami, United States; ATP 1000; Hard, outdoor 19 March – 1 April 2012	18	2R	(Colombia) Alejandro Falla	71	Win	6–2, 6–3
Miami Open; Miami, United States; ATP 1000; Hard, outdoor 19 March – 1 April 2012	–	3R	(Canada) Milos Raonic (26)	26	Walkover	N/A
Miami Open; Miami, United States; ATP 1000; Hard, outdoor 19 March – 1 April 2012	19	4R	(France) Gilles Simon (13)	13	Win	6–3, 6–4
Miami Open; Miami, United States; ATP 1000; Hard, outdoor 19 March – 1 April 2012	20	QF	(Serbia) Janko Tipsarević (9)	9	Win	4–6, 6–3, 6–4
Miami Open; Miami, United States; ATP 1000; Hard, outdoor 19 March – 1 April 2012	–	SF	(Spain) Rafael Nadal (2)	2	Walkover	N/A
Miami Open; Miami, United States; ATP 1000; Hard, outdoor 19 March – 1 April 2012	21	F	(Serbia) Novak Djokovic (1)	1	Loss (2)	1–6, 6–7^{(4–7)}
Monte-Carlo Masters; Monte Carlo, Monaco; ATP 1000; Clay, outdoor 16 – 22 April 2012
Monte-Carlo Masters; Monte Carlo, Monaco; ATP 1000; Clay, outdoor 16 – 22 April 2012	–	1R	Bye			
Monte-Carlo Masters; Monte Carlo, Monaco; ATP 1000; Clay, outdoor 16 – 22 April 2012	22	2R	(Serbia) Viktor Troicki	30	Win	6–0, 6–3
Monte-Carlo Masters; Monte Carlo, Monaco; ATP 1000; Clay, outdoor 16 – 22 April 2012	23	3R	(France) Julien Benneteau	31	Win	6–5 ret.
Monte-Carlo Masters; Monte Carlo, Monaco; ATP 1000; Clay, outdoor 16 – 22 April 2012	24	QF	(Czech Republic) Tomáš Berdych (6)	7	Loss	7–6^{(7–4)}, 2–6, 3–6
Barcelona Open; Barcelona, Spain; ATP 500; Clay, outdoor 23 – 30 April 2012
Barcelona Open; Barcelona, Spain; ATP 500; Clay, outdoor 23 – 30 April 2012	–	1R	Bye			
Barcelona Open; Barcelona, Spain; ATP 500; Clay, outdoor 23 – 30 April 2012	25	2R	(Ukraine) Sergiy Stakhovsky	68	Win	6–3, 6–2
Barcelona Open; Barcelona, Spain; ATP 500; Clay, outdoor 23 – 30 April 2012	26	3R	(Colombia) Santiago Giraldo	53	Win	6–1, 6–2
Barcelona Open; Barcelona, Spain; ATP 500; Clay, outdoor 23 – 30 April 2012	27	QF	(Canada) Milos Raonic (11)	24	Loss	4–6, 6–7^{(3–7)}
Italian Open; Rome, Italy; ATP 1000; Clay, outdoor 14 – 21 May 2012
Italian Open; Rome, Italy; ATP 1000; Clay, outdoor 14 – 21 May 2012	–	1R	Bye			
Italian Open; Rome, Italy; ATP 1000; Clay, outdoor 14 – 21 May 2012	28	2R	(Argentina) David Nalbandian	42	Win	6–1, 4–6, 7–5
Italian Open; Rome, Italy; ATP 1000; Clay, outdoor 14 – 21 May 2012	29	3R	(France) Richard Gasquet (16)	22	Loss	7–6^{(7–5)}, 3–6, 2–6
French Open; Paris, France; Grand Slam tournament Clay, outdoor 27 May – 11 June 2012
French Open; Paris, France; Grand Slam tournament Clay, outdoor 27 May – 11 June 2012	30	1R	(Japan) Tatsuma Ito	68	Win	6–1, 7–5, 6–0
French Open; Paris, France; Grand Slam tournament Clay, outdoor 27 May – 11 June 2012	31	2R	(Finland) Jarkko Nieminen	48	Win	1–6, 6–4, 6–1, 6–2
French Open; Paris, France; Grand Slam tournament Clay, outdoor 27 May – 11 June 2012	32	3R	(Colombia) Santiago Giraldo	50	Win	6–3, 6–4, 6–4
French Open; Paris, France; Grand Slam tournament Clay, outdoor 27 May – 11 June 2012	33	4R	(France) Richard Gasquet (17)	20	Win	1–6, 6–4, 6–1, 6–2
French Open; Paris, France; Grand Slam tournament Clay, outdoor 27 May – 11 June 2012	34	QF	(Spain) David Ferrer (6)	6	Loss	4–6, 7–6^{(7–3)}, 3–6, 2–6
Queen's Club Championships; London, United Kingdom; ATP 250; Grass, outdoor 11 – 17 June 2012
Queen's Club Championships; London, United Kingdom; ATP 250; Grass, outdoor 11 – 17 June 2012	–	1R	Bye			
Queen's Club Championships; London, United Kingdom; ATP 250; Grass, outdoor 11 – 17 June 2012	35	2R	(France) Nicolas Mahut	65	Loss	3–6, 7–6^{(7–4)}, 6–7^{(1–7)}
Wimbledon Championships; London, United Kingdom; Grand Slam tournament Grass, outdoor 25 June – 8 July 2012
Wimbledon Championships; London, United Kingdom; Grand Slam tournament Grass, outdoor 25 June – 8 July 2012	36	1R	(Russia) Nikolai Davydenko	47	Win	6–1, 6–1, 6–4
Wimbledon Championships; London, United Kingdom; Grand Slam tournament Grass, outdoor 25 June – 8 July 2012	37	2R	(Croatia) Ivo Karlović	59	Win	7–5, 6–7^{(5–7)}, 6–1, 7–6^{(7–4)}
Wimbledon Championships; London, United Kingdom; Grand Slam tournament Grass, outdoor 25 June – 8 July 2012	38	3R	(Cyprus) Marcos Baghdatis	42	Win	7–5, 3–6, 7–5, 6–1
Wimbledon Championships; London, United Kingdom; Grand Slam tournament Grass, outdoor 25 June – 8 July 2012	39	4R	(Croatia) Marin Čilić (16)	18	Win	7–5, 6–2, 6–3
Wimbledon Championships; London, United Kingdom; Grand Slam tournament Grass, outdoor 25 June – 8 July 2012	40	QF	(Spain) David Ferrer (7)	6	Win	6–7^{(5–7)}, 7–6^{(8–6)}, 6–4, 7–6^{(7–4)}
Wimbledon Championships; London, United Kingdom; Grand Slam tournament Grass, outdoor 25 June – 8 July 2012	41	SF	(France) Jo-Wilfried Tsonga (5)	5	Win	6–3, 6–4, 3–6, 7–5
Wimbledon Championships; London, United Kingdom; Grand Slam tournament Grass, outdoor 25 June – 8 July 2012	42	F	(Switzerland) Roger Federer (3)	3	Loss (3)	6–4, 5–7, 3–6, 4–6
Summer Olympic Games; London, United Kingdom; Olympics; Grass, outdoor 28 July – 5 August 2012
Summer Olympic Games; London, United Kingdom; Olympics; Grass, outdoor 28 July – 5 August 2012	43	1R	(Switzerland) Stan Wawrinka	24	Win	6–3, 6–3
Summer Olympic Games; London, United Kingdom; Olympics; Grass, outdoor 28 July – 5 August 2012	44	2R	(Finland) Jarkko Nieminen	43	Win	6–2, 6–4
Summer Olympic Games; London, United Kingdom; Olympics; Grass, outdoor 28 July – 5 August 2012	45	3R	(Cyprus) Marcos Baghdatis	45	Win	4–6, 6–1, 6–4
Summer Olympic Games; London, United Kingdom; Olympics; Grass, outdoor 28 July – 5 August 2012	46	QF	(Spain) Nicolás Almagro (11)	12	Win	6–2, 6–4
Summer Olympic Games; London, United Kingdom; Olympics; Grass, outdoor 28 July – 5 August 2012	47	SF	(Serbia) Novak Djokovic (2)	2	Win	7–5, 7–5
Summer Olympic Games; London, United Kingdom; Olympics; Grass, outdoor 28 July – 5 August 2012	48	G	(Switzerland) Roger Federer (1)	1	Win (2)	6–2, 6–1, 6–4
Canadian Open; Toronto, Canada; ATP 1000; Hard, outdoor 6 – 12 August 2012
Canadian Open; Toronto, Canada; ATP 1000; Hard, outdoor 6 – 12 August 2012	–	1R	Bye			
Canadian Open; Toronto, Canada; ATP 1000; Hard, outdoor 6 – 12 August 2012	49	2R	(Italy) Flavio Cipolla (Q)	97	Win	6–1, 6–3
Canadian Open; Toronto, Canada; ATP 1000; Hard, outdoor 6 – 12 August 2012	–	3R	(Canada) Milos Raonic (16)	24	Withdrew	N/A
Cincinnati Masters; Cincinnati, United States; ATP 1000; Hard, outdoor 13 – 19 August 2012
Cincinnati Masters; Cincinnati, United States; ATP 1000; Hard, outdoor 13 – 19 August 2012	–	1R	Bye			
Cincinnati Masters; Cincinnati, United States; ATP 1000; Hard, outdoor 13 – 19 August 2012	50	2R	(United States) Sam Querrey (WC)	29	Win	6–2, 6–4
Cincinnati Masters; Cincinnati, United States; ATP 1000; Hard, outdoor 13 – 19 August 2012	51	3R	(France) Jérémy Chardy (LL)	38	Loss	4–6, 4–6
US Open; New York City, United States; Grand Slam tournament Hard, outdoor 27 August – 10 September 2012
US Open; New York City, United States; Grand Slam tournament Hard, outdoor 27 August – 10 September 2012	52	1R	(Russia) Alex Bogomolov, Jr.	73	Win	6–2, 6–4, 6–1
US Open; New York City, United States; Grand Slam tournament Hard, outdoor 27 August – 10 September 2012	53	2R	(Croatia) Ivan Dodig	118	Win	6–2, 6–1, 6–3
US Open; New York City, United States; Grand Slam tournament Hard, outdoor 27 August – 10 September 2012	54	3R	(Spain) Feliciano López (30)	31	Win	7–6^{(7–5)}, 7–6^{(7–5)}, 4–6, 7–6^{(7–4)}
US Open; New York City, United States; Grand Slam tournament Hard, outdoor 27 August – 10 September 2012	55	4R	(Canada) Milos Raonic (16)	15	Win	6–4, 6–4, 6–2
US Open; New York City, United States; Grand Slam tournament Hard, outdoor 27 August – 10 September 2012	56	QF	(Croatia) Marin Čilić (12)	13	Win	3–6, 7–6^{(7–4)}, 6–2, 6–0
US Open; New York City, United States; Grand Slam tournament Hard, outdoor 27 August – 10 September 2012	57	SF	(Czech Republic) Tomáš Berdych (6)	7	Win	5–7, 6–2, 6–1, 7–6^{(9–7)}
US Open; New York City, United States; Grand Slam tournament Hard, outdoor 27 August – 10 September 2012	58	W	(Serbia) Novak Djokovic (2)	2	Win (3)	7–6^{(12–10)}, 7–5, 2–6, 3–6, 6–2
Japan Open; Tokyo, Japan; ATP 500; Hard, outdoor 1 – 7 October 2012
Japan Open; Tokyo, Japan; ATP 500; Hard, outdoor 1 – 7 October 2012	59	1R	(Croatia) Ivo Karlović (LL)	79	Win	7–6^{(11–9)}, 6–4
Japan Open; Tokyo, Japan; ATP 500; Hard, outdoor 1 – 7 October 2012	60	2R	(Slovakia) Lukáš Lacko	65	Win	6–1, 6–2
Japan Open; Tokyo, Japan; ATP 500; Hard, outdoor 1 – 7 October 2012	61	QF	(Switzerland) Stan Wawrinka (7)	16	Win	6–2, 3–6, 6–2
Japan Open; Tokyo, Japan; ATP 500; Hard, outdoor 1 – 7 October 2012	62	SF	(Canada) Milos Raonic (6)	15	Loss	3–6, 7–6^{(7–5)}, 6–7^{(4–7)}
Shanghai Masters; Shanghai, China; ATP 1000; Hard, outdoor 8 – 14 October 2012
Shanghai Masters; Shanghai, China; ATP 1000; Hard, outdoor 8 – 14 October 2012	–	1R	Bye			
Shanghai Masters; Shanghai, China; ATP 1000; Hard, outdoor 8 – 14 October 2012	–	2R	(Germany) Florian Mayer	25	Walkover	N/A
Shanghai Masters; Shanghai, China; ATP 1000; Hard, outdoor 8 – 14 October 2012	63	3R	(Ukraine) Alexandr Dolgopolov	20	Win	6–2, 6–2
Shanghai Masters; Shanghai, China; ATP 1000; Hard, outdoor 8 – 14 October 2012	64	QF	(Czech Republic) Radek Štěpánek	41	Win	4–6, 6–2, 6–3
Shanghai Masters; Shanghai, China; ATP 1000; Hard, outdoor 8 – 14 October 2012	65	SF	(Switzerland) Roger Federer (1)	1	Win	6–4, 6–4
Shanghai Masters; Shanghai, China; ATP 1000; Hard, outdoor 8 – 14 October 2012	66	F	(Serbia) Novak Djokovic (2)	2	Loss (4)	7–5, 6–7^{(11–13)}, 3–6
Paris Masters; Paris, France; ATP 1000; Hard, indoor 29 October – 4 November 2012
Paris Masters; Paris, France; ATP 1000; Hard, indoor 29 October – 4 November 2012	–	1R	Bye			
Paris Masters; Paris, France; ATP 1000; Hard, indoor 29 October – 4 November 2012	67	2R	(France) Paul-Henri Mathieu (WC)	64	Win	7–5, 6–3
Paris Masters; Paris, France; ATP 1000; Hard, indoor 29 October – 4 November 2012	68	3R	(Poland) Jerzy Janowicz (Q)	69	Loss	7–5, 6–7^{(4–7)}, 2–6
ATP World Tour Finals; London, United Kingdom; ATP Finals; Hard, indoor 5 – 11 November 2012
ATP World Tour Finals; London, United Kingdom; ATP Finals; Hard, indoor 5 – 11 November 2012	69	RR	(Czech Republic) Tomáš Berdych (5)	6	Win	3–6, 6–3, 6–4
ATP World Tour Finals; London, United Kingdom; ATP Finals; Hard, indoor 5 – 11 November 2012	70	RR	(Serbia) Novak Djokovic (1)	1	Loss	6–4, 3–6, 5–7
ATP World Tour Finals; London, United Kingdom; ATP Finals; Hard, indoor 5 – 11 November 2012	71	RR	(France) Jo-Wilfried Tsonga (7)	8	Win	6–2, 7–6^{(7–3)}
ATP World Tour Finals; London, United Kingdom; ATP Finals; Hard, indoor 5 – 11 November 2012	72	SF	(Switzerland) Roger Federer (2)	2	Loss	6–7^{(5–7)}, 2–6

=== Doubles matches ===
Tournament	Match	Round	Opponents (seed or key)	Ranks	Result	Score
Brisbane International; Brisbane, Australia; ATP 250; Hard, Outdoor; 2 – 8 January 2012; Partner: (Cyprus) Marcos Baghdatis
Brisbane International; Brisbane, Australia; ATP 250; Hard, Outdoor; 2 – 8 January 2012; Partner: (Cyprus) Marcos Baghdatis	1	1R	(Colombia) Santiago Giraldo / (Japan) Kei Nishikori	#324 / #183	Win	6–2, 6–2
Brisbane International; Brisbane, Australia; ATP 250; Hard, Outdoor; 2 – 8 January 2012; Partner: (Cyprus) Marcos Baghdatis	2	QF	(Austria) Jürgen Melzer / (Germany) Philipp Petzschner (2)	#13 / #10	Loss	6–3, 3–6, [13–15]
BNP Paribas Open; Indian Wells, United States; ATP 1000; Hard, outdoor 5 – 18 March 2012; Partner: (United Kingdom) Jamie Murray
BNP Paribas Open; Indian Wells, United States; ATP 1000; Hard, outdoor 5 – 18 March 2012; Partner: (United Kingdom) Jamie Murray	3	1R	(United Kingdom) Colin Fleming / (United Kingdom) Ross Hutchins	#24 / #27	Win	3–6, 6–2, [13–11]
BNP Paribas Open; Indian Wells, United States; ATP 1000; Hard, outdoor 5 – 18 March 2012; Partner: (United Kingdom) Jamie Murray	4	2R	(Belarus) Max Mirnyi / (Canada) Daniel Nestor (2)	#3 / #3	Loss	7–6^{(7–5)}, 6–7^{(5–7)}, [5–10]
Monte-Carlo Rolex Masters; Monte Carlo, Monaco; ATP 1000; Clay, outdoor 16 – 22 April 2012; Partner: (United Kingdom) Jamie Murray
Monte-Carlo Rolex Masters; Monte Carlo, Monaco; ATP 1000; Clay, outdoor 16 – 22 April 2012; Partner: (United Kingdom) Jamie Murray	5	1R	(Mexico) Santiago González / (Germany) Christopher Kas	#27 / #19	Win	6–4, 6–3
Monte-Carlo Rolex Masters; Monte Carlo, Monaco; ATP 1000; Clay, outdoor 16 – 22 April 2012; Partner: (United Kingdom) Jamie Murray	6	2R	(United States) Bob Bryan / (United States) Mike Bryan (1)	#1 / #1	Loss	5–7, 4–6
Barcelona Open Banc Sabadell; Barcelona, Spain; ATP 500; Clay, outdoor 23 – 29 April 2012; Partner: (United Kingdom) Jamie Murray
Barcelona Open Banc Sabadell; Barcelona, Spain; ATP 500; Clay, outdoor 23 – 29 April 2012; Partner: (United Kingdom) Jamie Murray	7	1R	(South Africa) Kevin Anderson / (Germany) Frank Moser	#110 / #52	Win	6–4, 6–4
Barcelona Open Banc Sabadell; Barcelona, Spain; ATP 500; Clay, outdoor 23 – 29 April 2012; Partner: (United Kingdom) Jamie Murray	8	2R	(Pakistan) Aisam-ul-Haq Qureshi / (Netherlands) Jean-Julien Rojer (7)	#14 / #36	Loss	2–6, 7–5, [8–10]
Summer Olympic Games; London, United Kingdom; Olympics; Grass, outdoor 30 July – 5 August 2012; Partner: (United Kingdom) Jamie Murray
Summer Olympic Games; London, United Kingdom; Olympics; Grass, outdoor 30 July – 5 August 2012; Partner: (United Kingdom) Jamie Murray	9	1R	(Austria) Jürgen Melzer / (Austria) Alexander Peya	#18 / #39	Loss	7–5, 6–7^{(6–8)}, 5–7
Rakuten Japan Open Tennis Championships; Tokyo, Japan; ATP 500; Hard, outdoor 1 – 7 October 2012; Partner: (United Kingdom) Jamie Murray
Rakuten Japan Open Tennis Championships; Tokyo, Japan; ATP 500; Hard, outdoor 1 – 7 October 2012; Partner: (United Kingdom) Jamie Murray	10	1R	(United States) Eric Butorac / (Finland) Jarkko Nieminen	#34 / #181	Win	5–7, 6–3, [10–4]
Rakuten Japan Open Tennis Championships; Tokyo, Japan; ATP 500; Hard, outdoor 1 – 7 October 2012; Partner: (United Kingdom) Jamie Murray	11	QF	(India) Leander Paes / (Czech Republic) Radek Štěpánek (1)	#5 / #9	Loss	4–6, 6–3, [2–10]

=== Mixed Doubles matches ===
Tournament	Match	Round	Opponents (seed or key)	Ranks	Result	Score
Summer Olympic Games; London, United Kingdom; Olympics; Grass, outdoor 1 – 5 August 2012; Partner: (United Kingdom) Laura Robson
Summer Olympic Games; London, United Kingdom; Olympics; Grass, outdoor 1 – 5 August 2012; Partner: (United Kingdom) Laura Robson	1 / 4	1R	(Czech Republic) Lucie Hradecká / (Czech Republic) Radek Štěpánek	#8 / #14	Win	7–5, 6–7^{(7–9)}, [10–7]
Summer Olympic Games; London, United Kingdom; Olympics; Grass, outdoor 1 – 5 August 2012; Partner: (United Kingdom) Laura Robson	2 / 5	QF	(Australia) Samantha Stosur / (Australia) Lleyton Hewitt (IP)	#5 / #158	Win	6–3, 3–6, [10–8]
Summer Olympic Games; London, United Kingdom; Olympics; Grass, outdoor 1 – 5 August 2012; Partner: (United Kingdom) Laura Robson	3 / 6	SF	(Germany) Sabine Lisicki / (Germany) Christopher Kas	#17 / #36	Win	4–6, 7–6^{(7–2)}, [10–7]
Summer Olympic Games; London, United Kingdom; Olympics; Grass, outdoor 1 – 5 August 2012; Partner: (United Kingdom) Laura Robson	4 / 7	F	(Belarus) Victoria Azarenka / (Belarus) Max Mirnyi (1)	#1 / #1	Loss (1)	6–2, 3–6, [8–10]

== Yearly Records ==
=== Head-to-head matchups ===
Ordered by number of wins (Bold denotes a top 10 player at the time of match, Italic means top 50)

- (Cyprus) Marcos Baghdatis 3–0
- (Czech Republic) **Tomáš Berdych** 3–1
- (Serbia) **Novak Djokovic** 3–4
- (Croatia) Marin Čilić 2–0
- (Ukraine) Alexandr Dolgopolov 2–0
- (Colombia) Santiago Giraldo 2–0
- (Croatia) Ivo Karlović 2–0
- (Kazakhstan) Mikhail Kukushkin 2–0
- (Finland) Jarkko Nieminen 2–0
- (France) **Jo-Wilfried Tsonga** 2–0
- (Switzerland) Stanislas Wawrinka 2–0
- (Switzerland) **Roger Federer** 2–3
- (Spain) Nicolás Almagro 1–0
- (France) Julien Benneteau 1–0
- (Germany) Michael Berrer 1–0
- (Russia) Alex Bogomolov, Jr. 1–0
- (Switzerland) Marco Chiudinelli 1–0
- (Italy) Flavio Cipolla 1–0
- (Russia) Nikolai Davydenko 1–0
- (Croatia) Ivan Dodig 1–0
- (Colombia) Alejandro Falla 1–0
- (United States) Ryan Harrison 1–0
- (Japan) Tatsuma Ito 1–0
- (Slovakia) Lukáš Lacko 1–0
- (France) Michaël Llodra 1–0
- (Spain) Feliciano López 1–0
- (France) Paul-Henri Mathieu 1–0
- (Germany) Florian Mayer 1–0
- (Luxembourg) Gilles Müller 1–0
- (Argentina) David Nalbandian 1–0
- (Japan) Kei Nishikori 1–0
- (Ukraine) Sergiy Stakhovsky 1–0
- (Czech Republic) Radek Štěpánek 1–0
- (Serbia) **Janko Tipsarević** 1–0
- (Australia) Bernard Tomic 1–0
- (Serbia) Viktor Troicki 1–0
- (Spain) **David Ferrer** 1–1
- (France) Richard Gasquet 1–1
- (Canada) Milos Raonic 1–2
- (France) Jérémy Chardy 0–1
- (Spain) Guillermo García-López 0–1
- (Poland) Jerzy Janowicz 0–1
- (France) Nicolas Mahut 0–1

=== Finals ===
Legend Grand Slam tournaments (1–1) ATP World Tour Finals (0–0) ATP World Tour Masters 1000 (0–2) Olympics (1–0) ATP World Tour 500 Series (0–1) ATP World Tour 250 Series (1–0)	Titles by Surface Hard (2–3) Clay (0–0) Grass (1–1) Carpet (0–0)	Titles by Surface Outdoors (3–4) Indoors (0–0)

Outcome	No.	Date	Tournament	Surface	Opponent	Score	Ref
Winner	22.	8 January 2012	Brisbane, Australia	Hard	(Ukraine) Alexandr Dolgopolov	6–1, 6–3	
Runner-up	10.	3 March 2012	Dubai, United Arab Emirates	Hard	(Switzerland) Roger Federer	5–7, 4–6	
Runner-up	11.	1 April 2012	Miami, United States	Hard	(Serbia) Novak Djokovic	1–6, 6–7^{(4–7)}	
Runner-up	12.	8 July 2012	London, United Kingdom	Grass	(Switzerland) Roger Federer	6–4, 5–7, 3–6, 4–6	
Winner	23.	5 August 2012	London, United Kingdom	Grass	(Switzerland) Roger Federer	6–2, 6–1, 6–4	
Winner	24.	9 September 2012	New York, United States	Hard	(Serbia) Novak Djokovic	7–6^{(12–10)}, 7–5, 2–6, 3–6, 6–2	
Runner-up	13.	14 October 2012	Shanghai, China	Hard	(Serbia) Novak Djokovic	7–5, 6–7^{(11–13)}, 3–6	

== See also ==
- 2012 Novak Djokovic tennis season
- 2012 Roger Federer tennis season
- 2012 Rafael Nadal tennis season
- 2012 ATP World Tour
