= 2012 Rafael Nadal tennis season =

Statistics for Spanish tennis player

- Full name: Rafael "Rafa" Nadal Parera
- Country: Spain
- Calendar prize money: $4,997,448

Singles
- Season record: 42–6
- Calendar titles: 4
- Year-end ranking: No. 4
- Ranking change from previous year: ▼2

Grand Slam & significant results
- Australian Open: F
- French Open: W
- Wimbledon: 2R
- US Open: DNS

Doubles
- Season record: 7–1 (87.5%)
- Calendar titles: 1
- Current ranking: No. 66
- Ranking change from previous year: ▼7

Grand Slam mixed doubles results
- Injuries: knee injury
- Last updated on: September 10, 2012.

The 2012 Rafael Nadal tennis season officially began on 2 January with the start of the 2012 ATP World Tour.

== Year summary ==
=== Asian/Pacific hard court season and Australian Open ===
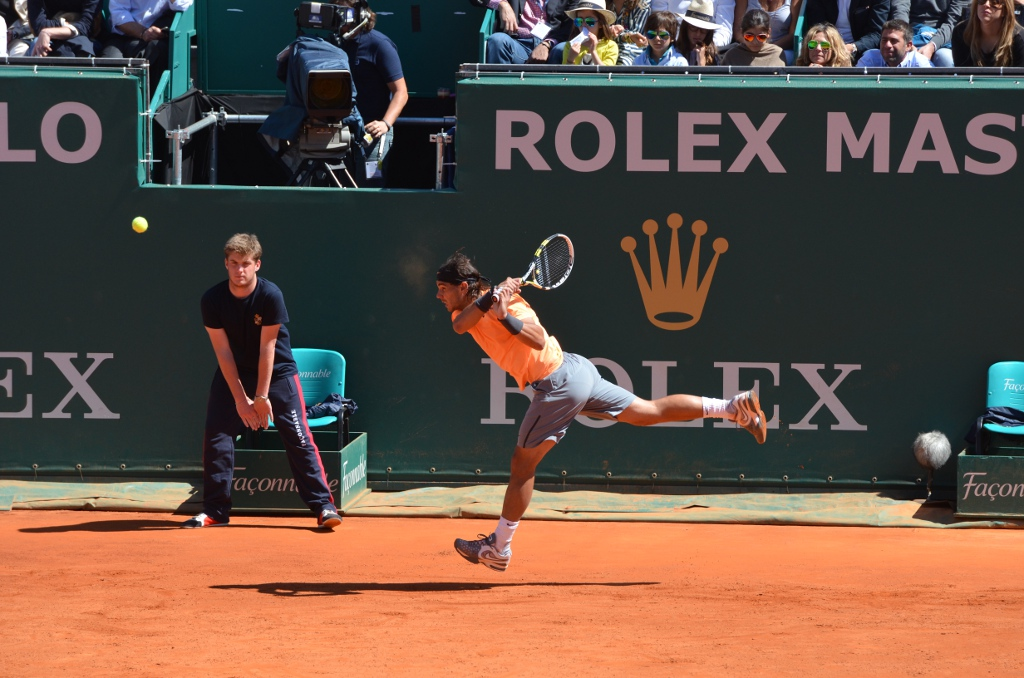
Nadal during the finals of the Monte-Carlo Rolex Masters

Nadal began his World Tour season at the Qatar Open. He beat Philipp Kohlschreiber and qualifier Denis Gremelmayr in rounds one and two and then won against seventh-seeded Mikhail Youzhny. In the semifinal he played poorly and lost to Gaël Monfils in two routine sets.

==== Australian Open ====
In the Australian Open Nadal began the tournament by breezing past qualifier Alex Kuznetsov of United States. The second round against Tommy Haas, who has never won a set against Rafael, was a little tighter but Nadal again advanced in three straight sets. He outwitted compatriot Feliciano López in fourth round and won in the quarterfinals in an epic four-set match against Tomáš Berdych, who was playing at arguably the peak of his career. He then beat Roger Federer, who was riding a 24-match win streak heading into the match, in a four-set match in the semifinals. With his win, he reached the finals of all four Grand Slams consecutively. It was one of two times in which Nadal reached consecutive hardcourt major finals, later doing so between the 2013 US Open and 2014 Australian Open. In the final, on 29 January, he was beaten by Novak Djokovic in five sets, the match being the longest ever match for a Grand Slam title. The epic final lasted 5 hours and 53 minutes. They set a new world record, breaking the latest longest major singles final between Mats Wilander and Ivan Lendl, which lasted 4 hours and 54 minutes, at the US Open in 1988.

=== US hard court season ===
At Indian Wells, Nadal made it to the semifinals, where he was beaten by Roger Federer, who went on to win the tournament. However, he won the Doubles event of the tournament for the second time in succession after beating John Isner and Sam Querrey in the final.

He also made the semifinals in Miami, but withdrew because of problems with his knee, the hard-court season taking its toll on his weak spot once again.

=== European clay court season and the French Open ===
As the clay court season started, Nadal was seeded 2nd at the 2012 Monte-Carlo Rolex Masters in April. He was troubled in his opening round by seed number 47, Nieminen of Finland, but prevailed in two sets. He then went on to clinch his 8th Monte Carlo trophy in 9 tries by beating Qualifier Mikhail Kukushkin, easing through Stanislas Wawrinka, and defeating Gilles Simon in the Semifinal, before topping World No. 1 Novak Djokovic in the final. This ended a streak of 7 straight final losses to Djokovic, which began at the 2011 Indian Wells Masters Final. Novak admitted that Nadal was just a better player, when asked whether the death of his grandfather early at the beginning of the tournament was affecting his whole play.

A day after the Monte-Carlo Rolex Masters Final, Nadal traveled to Barcelona where he received a 'bye' in the first round. His tremendous record on clay continued as he beat compatriot David Ferrer to clinch his seventh title in eight years at the Barcelona Open.

The Mutua Madrileña Madrid Open did not go very well for Nadal since he lost early in the 3R to Fernando Verdasco. Nadal stated that he was very unhappy with the new blue-colored clay and threatened not to attend in the future if the surface was not changed. Several other players such as Novak Djokovic agreed with Nadal in his criticism.

In the last tournament before the French Open Nadal went to Internazionali BNL d'Italia in Rome. He won every single match in two sets finishing with his second victory over Novak Djokovic and his third title in 2012.

==== French Open ====
At the French Open, Nadal managed to win all six matches before facing Novak Djokovic in the final, in which Nadal won in four sets. During the entire tournament, Nadal only lost a single set (against Djokovic in the final). With his seventh championship victory at Roland Garros, Nadal became the most successful tennis player at the French Open. It was his fifth consecutive major final, his personal best streak of reaching a major final.

Throughout the entire Clay court season, Nadal did not drop a single set on the red clay across 3 tournaments and 23 matches, which started in Monte Carlo, Barcelona, BNL d'Italia and was ended by Novak Djokovic in the Final of the French Open. He collected 5 bagels along the way (a bagel is a score of 6–0 in a set of a tennis match).

=== European grass court season, Wimbledon Championships and the Summer Olympics ===
For the first time since his debut in 2005, Nadal revisited the Gerry Weber Open in Halle, Germany. There he enrolled in both the Doubles and Singles events. He partnered up with Marcel Granollers as his Doubles teammate as well as "hitting company." After disappointing Quarter Finals losses at both the Singles and Doubles events of the Gerry Weber, Rafael Nadal took a week off from the tour and took a visit to his hometown, Manacor.

==== Wimbledon Championships ====
Wimbledon Championships did not go well for Nadal and was a disaster for him. He lost early in the second round to Lukáš Rosol in 5 sets in one of the greatest shocks in Grand Slam history. Rosol then succumbed to Philipp Kohlschreiber in the following round. After his loss, Nadal was off into yet another rest, this time in Sardinia.

==== London Olympics ====
Nadal's second appearance at the Summer Olympics, saw him chosen by the Spanish Sports Federation as the flag-bearer of Spain. He gained automatic entry to the Men's Singles Event, was the defending champion, and was the pre-tournament favourite to retain the gold medal, despite his early exit from Wimbledon in June.

But on 19 July, Nadal stated that he will be withdrawing from the Olympics citing a knee injury as his issue.

=== Summer US hard court season ===
After he withdrew from the London Olympics due to knee tendinitis, Nadal missed the rest of the US Open Series, leading up to the US Open, stating that he will not return to court before the recovery.

==== U.S. Open ====
On 15 August, Nadal announced via Twitter that he was withdrawing from the 2012 US Open (tennis). He had already withdrawn from the 2012 Rogers Cup and the 2012 Western & Southern Open.

=== Autumn season ===
On 3 September, Nadal announced on his homepage that he would not play for the next two months in order to rest and allow his knee to recover. He ultimately missed the remainder of the 2012 season, having received qualification for the ATP World Tour Finals in London after his second round exit from Wimbledon, before pulling out due to injury. Despite missing the final four months of the season, Nadal managed to finish ranked No. 4 in the world, his lowest year-end ranking in eight years.

Nadal stated in his announcement: "I have missed the Olympics and the US Open in the last few weeks, two of the most important tournaments of the year and that I really wanted to play. I really want to be back competing and enjoying the tennis tour, but I have many years in front of me and my knee needs some rest. I will be back when I have no pain and able to compete with guarantee[...]."

== All matches ==
Key
W	F	SF	QF	#R	RR	Q#	P#	DNQ	A	Z#	PO	G	S	B	NMS	NTI	P	NH

(W) winner; (F) finalist; (SF) semifinalist; (QF) quarterfinalist; (#R) rounds 4, 3, 2, 1; (RR) round-robin stage; (Q#) qualification round; (P#) preliminary round; (DNQ) did not qualify; (A) absent; (Z#) Davis/Fed Cup Zonal Group (with number indication) or (PO) play-off; (G) gold, (S) silver or (B) bronze Olympic/Paralympic medal; (NMS) not a Masters tournament; (NTI) not a Tier I tournament; (P) postponed; (NH) not held; (SR) strike rate (events won / competed); (W–L) win–loss record.
To avoid confusion and double counting, these charts are updated at the conclusion of a tournament or when the player's participation has ended.

=== Singles matches ===
Tournament	Match	Round	Opponent	Rank	Result	Score
Qatar ExxonMobil Open; Doha, Qatar; ATP World Tour 250; Hard, outdoor 2 – 7 January 2012	1 / 658	1R	(Germany) Philipp Kohlschreiber	43	Win	6–3, 6–7^{(2–7)}, 6–3
Qatar ExxonMobil Open; Doha, Qatar; ATP World Tour 250; Hard, outdoor 2 – 7 January 2012	2 / 659	2R	(Germany) Denis Gremelmayr	189	Win	6–2, 6–2
Qatar ExxonMobil Open; Doha, Qatar; ATP World Tour 250; Hard, outdoor 2 – 7 January 2012	3 / 660	QF	(Russia) Mikhail Youzhny	35	Win	6–4, 6–4
Qatar ExxonMobil Open; Doha, Qatar; ATP World Tour 250; Hard, outdoor 2 – 7 January 2012	4 / 661	SF	(France) Gaël Monfils	15	Loss	3–6, 4–6
Australian Open; Melbourne, Australia; Grand Slam; Hard, outdoor 16 – 29 January 2012	5 / 662	1R	(United States) Alex Kuznetsov	167	Win	6–4, 6–1, 6–1
Australian Open; Melbourne, Australia; Grand Slam; Hard, outdoor 16 – 29 January 2012	6 / 663	2R	(Germany) Tommy Haas	205	Win	6–4, 6–3, 6–4
Australian Open; Melbourne, Australia; Grand Slam; Hard, outdoor 16 – 29 January 2012	7 / 664	3R	(Slovakia) Lukáš Lacko	113	Win	6–2, 6–4, 6–2
Australian Open; Melbourne, Australia; Grand Slam; Hard, outdoor 16 – 29 January 2012	8 / 665	4R	(Spain) Feliciano López	19	Win	6–4, 6–4, 6–2
Australian Open; Melbourne, Australia; Grand Slam; Hard, outdoor 16 – 29 January 2012	9 / 666	QF	(Czech Republic) Tomáš Berdych	7	Win	6–7^{(5–7)}, 7–6^{(8–6)}, 6–4, 6–3
Australian Open; Melbourne, Australia; Grand Slam; Hard, outdoor 16 – 29 January 2012	10 / 667	SF	(Switzerland) Roger Federer	3	Win	6–7^{(5–7)}, 6–2, 7–6^{(7–5)}, 6–4
Australian Open; Melbourne, Australia; Grand Slam; Hard, outdoor 16 – 29 January 2012	11 / 668	F	(Serbia) Novak Djokovic	1	Loss (1)	7–5, 4–6, 2–6, 7–6^{(7–5)}, 5–7
BNP Paribas Open; Indian Wells, United States; ATP World Tour Masters 1000; Hard, outdoor 12 – 18 March 2012	–	1R	Bye			
BNP Paribas Open; Indian Wells, United States; ATP World Tour Masters 1000; Hard, outdoor 12 – 18 March 2012	12 / 669	2R	(Argentina) Leonardo Mayer	78	Win	6–1, 6–3
BNP Paribas Open; Indian Wells, United States; ATP World Tour Masters 1000; Hard, outdoor 12 – 18 March 2012	13 / 670	3R	(Spain) Marcel Granollers	26	Win	6–1, 6–4
BNP Paribas Open; Indian Wells, United States; ATP World Tour Masters 1000; Hard, outdoor 12 – 18 March 2012	14 / 671	4R	(Ukraine) Alexandr Dolgopolov	21	Win	6–3, 6–2
BNP Paribas Open; Indian Wells, United States; ATP World Tour Masters 1000; Hard, outdoor 12 – 18 March 2012	15 / 672	QF	(Argentina) David Nalbandian	74	Win	4–6, 7–5, 6–4
BNP Paribas Open; Indian Wells, United States; ATP World Tour Masters 1000; Hard, outdoor 12 – 18 March 2012	16 / 673	SF	(Switzerland) Roger Federer	3	Loss	3–6, 4–6
Sony Ericsson Open; Miami, United States; ATP World Tour Masters 1000; Hard, outdoor 21 March – 4 April 2012	–	1R	Bye			
Sony Ericsson Open; Miami, United States; ATP World Tour Masters 1000; Hard, outdoor 21 March – 4 April 2012	17 / 674	2R	(Colombia) Santiago Giraldo	57	Win	6–2, 6–0
Sony Ericsson Open; Miami, United States; ATP World Tour Masters 1000; Hard, outdoor 21 March – 4 April 2012	18 / 675	3R	(Czech Republic) Radek Štěpánek	25	Win	6–2, 6–2
Sony Ericsson Open; Miami, United States; ATP World Tour Masters 1000; Hard, outdoor 21 March – 4 April 2012	19 / 676	4R	(Japan) Kei Nishikori	16	Win	6–4, 6–4
Sony Ericsson Open; Miami, United States; ATP World Tour Masters 1000; Hard, outdoor 21 March – 4 April 2012	20 / 677	QF	(France) Jo-Wilfried Tsonga	6	Win	6–2, 5–7, 6–4
Sony Ericsson Open; Miami, United States; ATP World Tour Masters 1000; Hard, outdoor 21 March – 4 April 2012	–	SF	(United Kingdom) Andy Murray	4	Withdrew	N/A
Monte-Carlo Rolex Masters; Monte Carlo, Monaco; ATP World Tour Masters 1000; Clay, outdoor 15 – 22 April 2012	–	1R	Bye			
Monte-Carlo Rolex Masters; Monte Carlo, Monaco; ATP World Tour Masters 1000; Clay, outdoor 15 – 22 April 2012	21 / 678	2R	(Finland) Jarkko Nieminen	48	Win	6–4, 6–3
Monte-Carlo Rolex Masters; Monte Carlo, Monaco; ATP World Tour Masters 1000; Clay, outdoor 15 – 22 April 2012	22 / 679	3R	(Kazakhstan) Mikhail Kukushkin	68	Win	6–1, 6–1
Monte-Carlo Rolex Masters; Monte Carlo, Monaco; ATP World Tour Masters 1000; Clay, outdoor 15 – 22 April 2012	23 / 680	QF	(Switzerland) Stanislas Wawrinka	26	Win	7–5, 6–4
Monte-Carlo Rolex Masters; Monte Carlo, Monaco; ATP World Tour Masters 1000; Clay, outdoor 15 – 22 April 2012	24 / 681	SF	(France) Gilles Simon	15	Win	6–3, 6–4
Monte-Carlo Rolex Masters; Monte Carlo, Monaco; ATP World Tour Masters 1000; Clay, outdoor 15 – 22 April 2012	25 / 682	W	(Serbia) Novak Djokovic	1	Win (1)	6–3, 6–1
Barcelona Open Banco Sabadell; Barcelona, Spain; ATP World Tour 500; Clay, outdoor 23 – 29 April 2012	–	1R	Bye			
Barcelona Open Banco Sabadell; Barcelona, Spain; ATP World Tour 500; Clay, outdoor 23 – 29 April 2012	26 / 683	2R	(Spain) Guillermo García López	78	Win	6–1, 6–2
Barcelona Open Banco Sabadell; Barcelona, Spain; ATP World Tour 500; Clay, outdoor 23 – 29 April 2012	27 / 684	3R	(Colombia) Robert Farah	246	Win	6–2, 6–3
Barcelona Open Banco Sabadell; Barcelona, Spain; ATP World Tour 500; Clay, outdoor 23 – 29 April 2012	28 / 685	QF	(Serbia) Janko Tipsarević	8	Win	6–2, 6–2
Barcelona Open Banco Sabadell; Barcelona, Spain; ATP World Tour 500; Clay, outdoor 23 – 29 April 2012	29 / 686	SF	(Spain) Fernando Verdasco	20	Win	6–0, 6–4
Barcelona Open Banco Sabadell; Barcelona, Spain; ATP World Tour 500; Clay, outdoor 23 – 29 April 2012	30 / 687	W	(Spain) David Ferrer	6	Win (2)	7–6^{(7–1)}, 7–5
Mutua Madrid Open; Madrid, Spain; ATP World Tour Masters 1000; Clay, outdoor 7 – 13 May 2012	–	1R	Bye			
Mutua Madrid Open; Madrid, Spain; ATP World Tour Masters 1000; Clay, outdoor 7 – 13 May 2012	31 / 688	2R	(Russia) Nikolay Davydenko	54	Win	6–2, 6–2
Mutua Madrid Open; Madrid, Spain; ATP World Tour Masters 1000; Clay, outdoor 7 – 13 May 2012	32 / 689	3R	(Spain) Fernando Verdasco	19	Loss	3–6, 6–3, 5–7
Internazionali BNL d'Italia; Rome, Italy; ATP World Tour Masters 1000; Clay, outdoor 13 – 20 May 2012	–	1R	Bye			
Internazionali BNL d'Italia; Rome, Italy; ATP World Tour Masters 1000; Clay, outdoor 13 – 20 May 2012	33 / 690	2R	(Germany) Florian Mayer	28	Win	6–1, 7–5
Internazionali BNL d'Italia; Rome, Italy; ATP World Tour Masters 1000; Clay, outdoor 13 – 20 May 2012	34 / 691	3R	(Spain) Marcel Granollers	26	Win	6–1, 6–1
Internazionali BNL d'Italia; Rome, Italy; ATP World Tour Masters 1000; Clay, outdoor 13 – 20 May 2012	35 / 692	QF	(Czech Republic) Tomáš Berdych	7	Win	6–4, 7–5
Internazionali BNL d'Italia; Rome, Italy; ATP World Tour Masters 1000; Clay, outdoor 13 – 20 May 2012	36 / 693	SF	(Spain) David Ferrer	6	Win	7–6^{(8–6)}, 6–0
Internazionali BNL d'Italia; Rome, Italy; ATP World Tour Masters 1000; Clay, outdoor 13 – 20 May 2012	37 / 694	W	(Serbia) Novak Djokovic	1	Win (3)	7–5, 6–3
French Open; Paris, France; Grand Slam; Clay, outdoor 28 May – 10 June 2012	38 / 695	1R	(Italy) Simone Bolelli	111	Win	6–2, 6–2, 6–1
French Open; Paris, France; Grand Slam; Clay, outdoor 28 May – 10 June 2012	39 / 696	2R	(Uzbekistan) Denis Istomin	43	Win	6–2, 6–2, 6–0
French Open; Paris, France; Grand Slam; Clay, outdoor 28 May – 10 June 2012	40 / 697	3R	(Argentina) Eduardo Schwank	192	Win	6–1, 6–3, 6–4
French Open; Paris, France; Grand Slam; Clay, outdoor 28 May – 10 June 2012	41 / 698	4R	(Argentina) Juan Mónaco	15	Win	6–2, 6–0, 6–0
French Open; Paris, France; Grand Slam; Clay, outdoor 28 May – 10 June 2012	42 / 699	QF	(Spain) Nicolás Almagro	13	Win	7–6^{(7–4)}, 6–2, 6–3
French Open; Paris, France; Grand Slam; Clay, outdoor 28 May – 10 June 2012	43 / 700	SF	(Spain) David Ferrer	6	Win	6–2, 6–2, 6–1
French Open; Paris, France; Grand Slam; Clay, outdoor 28 May – 10 June 2012	44 / 701	W	(Serbia) Novak Djokovic	1	Win (4)	6–4, 6–3, 2–6, 7–5
Gerry Weber Open; Halle, Germany; ATP World Tour 250; Grass, outdoor 11 – 17 June 2012	-	1R	Bye			
Gerry Weber Open; Halle, Germany; ATP World Tour 250; Grass, outdoor 11 – 17 June 2012	45 / 702	2R	(Slovakia) Lukáš Lacko	58	Win	7–5, 6–1
Gerry Weber Open; Halle, Germany; ATP World Tour 250; Grass, outdoor 11 – 17 June 2012	46 / 703	QF	(Germany) Philipp Kohlschreiber	34	Loss	3–6, 4–6
Wimbledon Championships; London, United Kingdom; Grand Slam; Grass, outdoor 25 June – 8 July 2012	47 / 704	1R	(Brazil) Thomaz Bellucci	80	Win	7–6^{(7–0)}, 6–2, 6–3
Wimbledon Championships; London, United Kingdom; Grand Slam; Grass, outdoor 25 June – 8 July 2012	48 / 705	2R	(Czech Republic) Lukáš Rosol	100	Loss	7–6^{(11–9)}, 4–6, 4–6, 6–2, 4–6

=== Doubles matches ===
Tournament	Match	Round	Opponents	Ranking	Result	Score
BNP Paribas Open; Indian Wells, United States; ATP World Tour Masters 1000; Hard, outdoor 12 – 18 March 2012; Partner: (Spain) Marc López	1 / 150	1R	(France) Michaël Llodra (Serbia) Nenad Zimonjić	#5 / #6	Win	6–4, 6–4
BNP Paribas Open; Indian Wells, United States; ATP World Tour Masters 1000; Hard, outdoor 12 – 18 March 2012; Partner: (Spain) Marc López	2 / 151	2R	(Ukraine) Alexandr Dolgopolov (Belgium) Xavier Malisse	#50 / #26	Win	6–4, 6–3
BNP Paribas Open; Indian Wells, United States; ATP World Tour Masters 1000; Hard, outdoor 12 – 18 March 2012; Partner: (Spain) Marc López	3 / 152	QF	(India) Leander Paes (Czech Republic) Radek Štěpánek	#7 / #22	Win	6–4, 7–6^{(7–5)}
BNP Paribas Open; Indian Wells, United States; ATP World Tour Masters 1000; Hard, outdoor 12 – 18 March 2012; Partner: (Spain) Marc López	4 / 153	SF	(Poland) Mariusz Fyrstenberg (Poland) Marcin Matkowski	#13 / #13	Win	6–2, 6–0
BNP Paribas Open; Indian Wells, United States; ATP World Tour Masters 1000; Hard, outdoor 12 – 18 March 2012; Partner: (Spain) Marc López	5 / 154	W	(United States) John Isner (United States) Sam Querrey	#33 / #35	Win	6–2, 7–6^{(7–3)}
Sony Ericsson Open; Miami, United States; ATP World Tour Masters 1000; Hard, outdoor 21 March – 4 April 2012; Partner: (Spain) Marcel Granollers	6 / 155	1R	(Croatia) Marin Čilić (Croatia) Ivo Karlović	#80 / #128	Win	6–1, 6–3
Sony Ericsson Open; Miami, United States; ATP World Tour Masters 1000; Hard, outdoor 21 March – 4 April 2012; Partner: (Spain) Marcel Granollers	7 / 156	2R	(India) Mahesh Bhupathi (India) Rohan Bopanna	#13 / #12	Loss	4–6, 3–6
Gerry Weber Open; Halle, Germany; ATP World Tour 250; Grass, outdoor 11 – 17 June 2012; Partner: (Spain) Marcel Granollers	8 / 157	1R	(Czech Republic) Michal Mertiňák (Serbia) Viktor Troicki	#78 / #76	Win	5–7, 6–2, [10–8]
Gerry Weber Open; Halle, Germany; ATP World Tour 250; Grass, outdoor 11 – 17 June 2012; Partner: (Spain) Marcel Granollers	–	QF	(Germany) Michael Kohlmann (Germany) Florian Mayer	#77 / #62	Withdrew	

== Tournament schedule ==
=== Singles schedule ===
Nadal's 2012 singles tournament schedule is as follows:

Date	Championship	Location	Category	Surface^{1}	Outcome 2011	Points 2011	Points 2012	Outcome 2012
02.01.2012–07.01.2012	Qatar ExxonMobil Open	Qatar	ATP World Tour 250	Hard	SF	90	90	SF
16.01.2012–29.01.2012	Australian Open	Australia	Grand Slam	Hard	QF	360	1200	F
08.03.2012–18.03.2012	BNP Paribas Open	USA	ATP World Tour Masters 1000	Hard	F	600	360	SF
21.03.2012–01.04.2012	Sony Ericsson Open	USA	ATP World Tour Masters 1000	Hard	F	600	360	SF
15.04.2012–22.04.2012	Monte-Carlo Rolex Masters	Monaco	ATP World Tour Masters 1000	Clay	W	1000	1000	W
23.04.2012–29.04.2012	Barcelona Open Banco Sabadell	Spain	ATP World Tour 500	Clay	W	500	500	W
06.05.2012–13.05.2012	Mutua Madrid Open	Spain	ATP World Tour Masters 1000	Clay	F	600	90	R16
13.05.2012–20.05.2012	Internazionali BNL d'Italia	Italy	ATP World Tour Masters 1000	Clay	F	600	1000	W
27.05.2012–10.06.2012	French Open	France	Grand Slam	Clay	W	2000	2000	W
11.06.2012–17.06.2012	Gerry Weber Open	Germany	ATP World Tour 250	Grass	DNS		45	QF
25.06.2012–08.07.2012	Wimbledon Championships	UK	Grand Slam	Grass	F	1200	45	2R
27.08.2012–09.09.2012	US Open	USA	Grand Slam	Hard	F	1200	0	DNS
29.10.2012–04.11.2012	BNP Paribas Masters	France	ATP World Tour Masters 1000	Hard (i)	DNS			
05.11.2012–12.11.2012	Barclays ATP World Tour Finals	UK	ATP World Tour Finals	Hard (i)	RR	200		
Points earned at Davis Cup						280		
Points earned at Non-Countable Tournaments						45		
Total year points						11010	▼4320 ^{2}	
Overall points							6690	

^{1} The symbol (i) = indoors means that the respective tournament will be held indoors.
^{2} Difference between new points and previous points. ATP Points Distribution.

== Yearly records ==
=== Head-to-head matchups ===
Ordered by number of wins

- (Spain) David Ferrer 3–0
- (Serbia) Novak Djokovic 3–1
- (Czech Republic) Tomáš Berdych 2–0
- (Spain) Marcel Granollers 2–0
- (Slovakia) Lukáš Lacko 2–0
- (United States) Alex Kuznetsov 1–0
- (Serbia) Janko Tipsarević 1–0
- (Germany) Denis Gremelmayr 1–0
- (Germany) Tommy Haas 1–0
- (Germany) Florian Mayer 1–0
- (Russia) Mikhail Youzhny 1–0
- (Russia) Nikolay Davydenko 1–0
- (Japan) Kei Nishikori 1–0
- (Czech Republic) Radek Štěpánek 1–0
- (Argentina) Juan Mónaco 1–0
- (Argentina) David Nalbandian 1–0
- (Argentina) Leonardo Mayer 1–0
- (Argentina) Eduardo Schwank 1–0
- (Finland) Jarkko Nieminen 1–0
- (Kazakhstan) Mikhail Kukushkin 1–0
- (Switzerland) Stanislas Wawrinka 1–0
- (Ukraine) Alexandr Dolgopolov 1–0
- (Italy) Simone Bolelli 1–0
- (Uzbekistan) Denis Istomin 1–0
- (Colombia) Robert Farah 1–0
- (Colombia) Santiago Giraldo 1–0
- (France) Jo-Wilfried Tsonga 1–0
- (France) Gilles Simon 1–0
- (Spain) Feliciano López 1–0
- (Spain) Guillermo García López 1–0
- (Spain) Nicolás Almagro 1–0
- (Brazil) Thomaz Bellucci 1–0
- (Germany) Philipp Kohlschreiber 1–1
- (Spain) Fernando Verdasco 1–1
- (Switzerland) Roger Federer 1–1
- (Czech Republic) Lukáš Rosol 0–1
- (France) Gaël Monfils 0–1

== See also ==
- 2012 Roger Federer tennis season
- 2012 Novak Djokovic tennis season
