= 2012 Mutua Madrid Open =

- Date: 7–13 May
- Edition: 11th (men); 4th (women)
- Surface: Clay (blue) / outdoor
- Location: Madrid, Spain
- Venue: Park Manzanares

Champions

Men's singles
- (Switzerland) Roger Federer

Women's singles
- (United States) Serena Williams

Men's doubles
- (Poland) Mariusz Fyrstenberg / (Poland) Marcin Matkowski

Women's doubles
- (Italy) Sara Errani / (Italy) Roberta Vinci
← 2011 ·	Madrid Open	· 2013 →

The 2012 Madrid Masters (also known as the Mutua Madrid Open for sponsorship reasons) was played on outdoor blue clay courts at the Park Manzanares in Madrid, Spain from 7 to 13 May. It was the 11th edition of the event on the ATP and 4th on the WTA. It was classified as an ATP World Tour Masters 1000 event on the 2012 ATP World Tour and a Premier Mandatory event on the 2012 WTA Tour. The clay courts used for the tournament were dyed blue to provide better contrast with the ball, which garnered controversy amongst players who found the dyeing made the surface too slippery and difficult to maneuver, putting defensive players at a disadvantage. Ion Țiriac, the former Romanian ATP player and billionaire businessman who owns the tournament, instituted the use of the color.

== Points and prize money ==
=== Point distribution ===
Stage	Men's singles	Men's doubles	Women's singles	Women's doubles
Champion	1000			
Runner up	600		700	
Semifinals	360		450	
Quarterfinals	180		250	
Round of 16	90		140	
Round of 32	45	10	80	5
Round of 64	10	–	5	–
Qualifier	25	–	30	–
Qualifying Finalist	16	–	20	–
Qualifying 1st round		–	1	–

=== Prize money ===
Stage	Men's singles	Men's doubles	Women's singles	Women's doubles
Champion	€585,800	€181,400	€631,000	€199,000
Runner up	€287,225	€88,800	€313,000	€100,000
Semifinals	€144,560	€44,550	€149,500	€45,000
Quarterfinals	€73,510	€22,860	€70,000	€18,975
Round of 16	€38,170	€11,820	€33,000	€9,500
Round of 32	€20,125	€6,240	€17,500	€5,000
Round of 64	€10,865	–	€8,750	–
Final round qualifying	€2,505	–	€2,375	–
First round qualifying	€1,275	–	€1,140	–

== ATP singles main-draw entrants ==
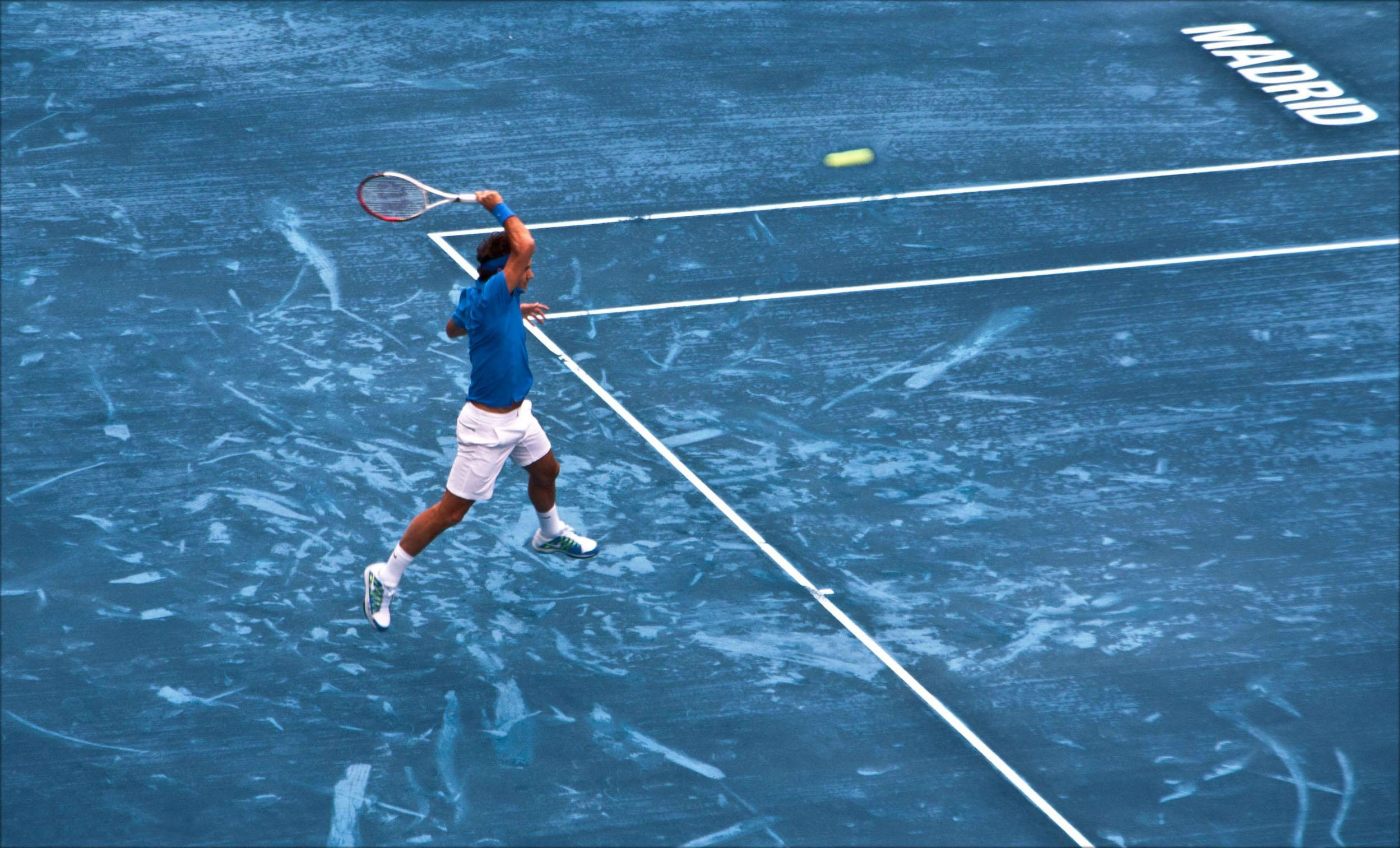
Roger Federer became the first and only man to win a tournament on blue clay.

=== Seeds ===
Country	Player	Rank^{1}	Seed
SRB	Novak Djokovic	1	1
ESP	Rafael Nadal	2	2
SUI	Roger Federer	3	3
FRA	Jo-Wilfried Tsonga	5	4
ESP	David Ferrer	6	5
CZE	Tomáš Berdych	7	6
SRB	Janko Tipsarević	8	7
USA	John Isner	10	8
FRA	Gilles Simon	11	9
ARG	Juan Martín del Potro	12	10
ESP	Nicolás Almagro	13	11
FRA	Gaël Monfils	14	12
ESP	Feliciano López	16	13
FRA	Richard Gasquet	18	14
ESP	Fernando Verdasco	19	15
UKR	Alexandr Dolgopolov	20	16

- Rankings are as of April 30, 2012

=== Other entrants ===
The following players received wildcards into the main draw:

- (Spain) Guillermo García López
- (United States) Ryan Harrison
- (Spain) Javier Martí
- (Spain) Albert Montañés

The following players received entry from the qualifying draw:

- (Russia) Igor Andreev
- (Argentina) Federico Delbonis
- (Colombia) Alejandro Falla
- (Spain) Daniel Gimeno Traver
- (Colombia) Santiago Giraldo
- (Romania) Victor Hănescu
- (Ukraine) Sergiy Stakhovsky

=== Withdrawals ===
- (United States) Mardy Fish
- (Argentina) Juan Mónaco (ankle injury)
- (United Kingdom) Andy Murray (back injury)
- (Japan) Kei Nishikori (stomach injury)
- (United States) Andy Roddick (hamstring injury)
- (Sweden) Robin Söderling (mononucleosis)
- (France) Julien Benneteau (elbow, ankle and wrist injuries)
- (Poland) Łukasz Kubot

== ATP doubles main-draw entrants ==
=== Seeds ===
Country	Player	Country	Player	Rank^{1}	Seed
USA	Bob Bryan	USA	Mike Bryan	2	1
BLR	Max Mirnyi	CAN	Daniel Nestor	6	2
FRA	Michaël Llodra	SRB	Nenad Zimonjić	11	3
POL	Mariusz Fyrstenberg	POL	Marcin Matkowski	16	4
IND	Leander Paes	CZE	Radek Štěpánek	20	5
SWE	Robert Lindstedt	ROU	Horia Tecău	21	6
IND	Mahesh Bhupathi	IND	Rohan Bopanna	27	7
AUT	Jürgen Melzer	GER	Philipp Petzschner	33	8

- Rankings are as of April 30, 2012

=== Other entrants ===
The following pairs received wildcards into the doubles main draw:

- (Ukraine) Sergei Bubka / (Spain) Javier Martí
- (Spain) Daniel Gimeno Traver / (Spain) Iván Navarro

The following pair received entry as alternates:

- (Russia) Alex Bogomolov Jr. / (Italy) Fabio Fognini

=== Withdrawals ===
- (Germany) Philipp Kohlschreiber (adductor injury)

== WTA singles main-draw entrants ==
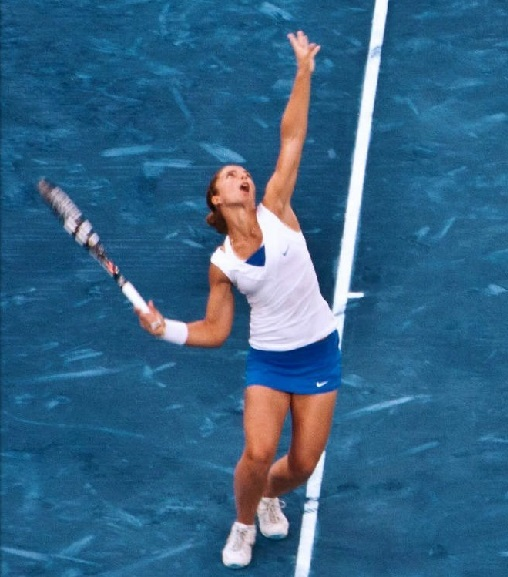
Sara Errani serving.

=== Seeds ===
Country	Player	Rank^{1}	Seed
BLR	Victoria Azarenka	1	1
RUS	Maria Sharapova	2	2
CZE	Petra Kvitová	3	3
POL	Agnieszka Radwańska	4	4
AUS	Samantha Stosur	5	5
DEN	Caroline Wozniacki	6	6
FRA	Marion Bartoli	7	7
CHN	Li Na	8	8
USA	Serena Williams	9	9
RUS	Vera Zvonareva	10	10
ITA	Francesca Schiavone	11	11
GER	Angelique Kerber	14	12
SRB	Ana Ivanovic	15	13
SVK	Dominika Cibulková	16	14
SRB	Jelena Janković	17	15
RUS	Maria Kirilenko	19	16

- Rankings are as of April 30, 2012

=== Other entrants ===
The following players received wildcards into the main draw:

- (Spain) Lara Arruabarrena Vecino
- (Spain) Garbiñe Muguruza Blanco
- (Spain) Sílvia Soler Espinosa
- (Spain) Carla Suárez Navarro
- (United States) Venus Williams

The following players received entry from the qualifying draw:

- (United States) Jill Craybas
- (Spain) Lourdes Domínguez Lino
- (Czech Republic) Andrea Hlaváčková
- (Czech Republic) Lucie Hradecká
- (France) Mathilde Johansson
- (Sweden) Johanna Larsson
- (United States) Varvara Lepchenko
- (Australia) Anastasia Rodionova

=== Withdrawals ===
- (Slovakia) Daniela Hantuchová
- (Germany) Sabine Lisicki (ankle injury)
- (Italy) Flavia Pennetta (wrist injury)
- (Germany) Andrea Petkovic (ankle injury)

== WTA doubles main-draw entrants ==
=== Seeds ===
Country	Player	Country	Player	Rank^{1}	Seed
USA	Liezel Huber	USA	Lisa Raymond	2	1
CZE	Květa Peschke	SLO	Katarina Srebotnik	7	2
CZE	Andrea Hlaváčková	CZE	Lucie Hradecká	19	3
RUS	Maria Kirilenko	RUS	Nadia Petrova	23	4
ITA	Sara Errani	ITA	Roberta Vinci	25	5
IND	Sania Mirza	AUS	Anastasia Rodionova	28	6
KAZ	Yaroslava Shvedova	KAZ	Galina Voskoboeva	38	7
CZE	Iveta Benešová	CZE	Barbora Záhlavová-Strýcová	40	8

- Rankings are as of April 30, 2012

==== Other entrants ====
The following pairs received wildcards into the doubles main draw:

- (Slovakia) Dominika Cibulková / (Slovakia) Janette Husárová
- (Spain) Lourdes Domínguez Lino / (Spain) Laura Pous Tió
- (Russia) Anastasia Pavlyuchenkova / (Czech Republic) Lucie Šafářová
- (Spain) Sílvia Soler Espinosa / (Spain) Carla Suárez Navarro

== Finals ==
=== Men's singles ===
(Switzerland) Roger Federer defeated (Czech Republic) Tomáš Berdych, 3–6, 7–5, 7–5

- It was Federer's fourth singles title of the year (out of four finals), and the 74th of his career. The win, Federer's third in Madrid after 2006 and 2009, was his second ATP World Tour Masters 1000 title of the year, and his 20th overall – at the time tying the record of Masters titles co-held by Rafael Nadal.

=== Women's singles ===
(United States) Serena Williams defeated (Belarus) Victoria Azarenka, 6–1, 6–3

- It was Williams' second singles title of the year, and the 41st of her career – which tied her with Kim Clijsters as second among active players (10th in the Open Era) with the most singles titles. It was Williams' first Premier Mandatory title of the year, and her 12th Premier Mandatory/Premier 5 or Tier I title overall.

=== Men's doubles ===
(Poland) Mariusz Fyrstenberg / (Poland) Marcin Matkowski defeated (Sweden) Robert Lindstedt / (Romania) Horia Tecău, 6–3, 6–4

=== Women's doubles ===
(Italy) Sara Errani / (Italy) Roberta Vinci defeated (Russia) Ekaterina Makarova / (Russia) Elena Vesnina, 6–1, 3–6, [10–4]
