= 2012 Western & Southern Open =

- Date: August 11–19
- Edition: 111th (men) / 84th (women)
- Category: ATP World Tour Masters 1000 (men); WTA Premier 5 (women)
- Surface: Hard / outdoor
- Location: Mason, Ohio, United States
- Venue: Lindner Family Tennis Center

Champions

Men's singles
- (Switzerland) Roger Federer

Women's singles
- (China) Li Na

Men's doubles
- (Sweden) Robert Lindstedt / (Romania) Horia Tecău

Women's doubles
- (Czech Republic) Andrea Hlaváčková / (Czech Republic) Lucie Hradecká
- Cincinnati Masters

The 2012 Western and Southern Open was a tennis tournament played on outdoor hard courts. It was the 111th edition (for the men) and the 84th (for the women) of the Cincinnati Masters, and was part of the ATP World Tour Masters 1000 of the 2012 ATP World Tour, and of the WTA Premier 5 tournaments of the 2012 WTA Tour. The tournament was held at the Lindner Family Tennis Center in Mason, Ohio, United States, from August 11 to August 19, 2012. Roger Federer and Li Na won the singles titles.

== Points and prize money ==
=== Point distribution ===
Stage	Men's singles	Men's doubles	Women's singles	Women's doubles
Champion	1000		900	
Runner up	600		620	
Semifinals	360		395	
Quarterfinals	180		225	
Round of 16	90		125	
Round of 32	45	10	70	1
Round of 64	10	–	1	–
Qualifier	25	–	30	–
Qualifying Finalist	16	–	20	–
Qualifying 1st round	0	–	1	–

=== Prize money ===
Stage	Men's singles	Men's doubles	Women's singles	Women's doubles
Champion	$535,600	$165,860	$385,000	$110,000
Runner up	$262,610	$81,200	$192,000	$55,000
Semifinals	$132,165	$40,730	$96,100	$27,525
Quarterfinals	$67,205	$20,910	$45,750	$13,850
Round of 16	$34,900	$10,800	$22,060	$7,000
Round of 32	$18,400	$5,700	$11,300	$3,500
Round of 64	$9,935	–	$6,100	–
Final round qualifying	$2,290	–	$2,050	–
First round qualifying	$1,165	–	$1,080	–

== ATP singles main-draw entrants ==
=== Seeds ===
The following players were seeded in the main singles draw, following the ATP rankings of August 6, 2012:

Country	Player	Ranking	Seeds
SUI	Roger Federer	1	1
SRB	Novak Djokovic	2	2
GBR	Andy Murray	4	3
ESP	David Ferrer	5	4
CZE	Tomáš Berdych	7	5
ARG	Juan Martín del Potro	8	6
SRB	Janko Tipsarević	9	7
ARG	Juan Mónaco	10	8
~~USA~~	~~John Isner~~	~~11~~	~~9~~
USA	Mardy Fish	13	10
~~FRA~~	~~Gilles Simon~~	~~14~~	~~11~~
CRO	Marin Čilić	15	12
UKR	Alexandr Dolgopolov	16	13
JPN	Kei Nishikori	17	14
GER	Philipp Kohlschreiber	18	15
USA	Andy Roddick	20	16

=== Other entrants ===
The following players received wild cards into the main singles draw:

- (United States) Brian Baker
- (United States) James Blake
- (Australia) Lleyton Hewitt
- (United States) Sam Querrey

The following players received entry from the singles qualifying draw:

- (Croatia) Ivan Dodig
- (Italy) Fabio Fognini
- (United States) Jesse Levine
- (France) Paul-Henri Mathieu
- (Australia) Marinko Matosevic
- (Ukraine) Sergiy Stakhovsky
- (Chinese Taipei) Lu Yen-hsun

The following players received entry as lucky losers:

- (France) Jérémy Chardy
- (Colombia) Alejandro Falla

=== Withdrawals ===
- (Spain) Nicolás Almagro (shoulder injury)
- (Spain) Juan Carlos Ferrero (foot injury)
- (United States) John Isner (back injury)
- (France) Gaël Monfils (knee injury)
- (Spain) Rafael Nadal (knee injury)
- (France) Gilles Simon (shoulder injury)
- (France) Jo-Wilfried Tsonga (knee injury)
- (Spain) Fernando Verdasco (wrist injury)

=== Retirements ===
- (Serbia) Janko Tipsarević (virus)
- (Russia) Nikolay Davydenko

== ATP doubles main-draw entrants ==
=== Seeds ===
Country	Player	Country	Player	Rank^{1}	Seed
BLR	Max Mirnyi	CAN	Daniel Nestor	2	1
USA	Bob Bryan	USA	Mike Bryan	6	2
POL	Mariusz Fyrstenberg	POL	Marcin Matkowski	13	3
SWE	Robert Lindstedt	ROU	Horia Tecău	21	4
IND	Leander Paes	CZE	Radek Štěpánek	21	5
IND	Mahesh Bhupathi	IND	Rohan Bopanna	28	6
ESP	Marcel Granollers	ESP	Marc López	33	7
PAK	Aisam-ul-Haq Qureshi	NED	Jean-Julien Rojer	33	8

- Rankings are as of August 6, 2012

=== Other entrants ===
The following pairs received wildcards into the doubles main draw:

- (United States) Brian Baker / (United States) Rajeev Ram
- (United States) James Blake / (United States) Sam Querrey

=== Retirements ===
- (Argentina) Juan Mónaco (toe injury)
- (Serbia) Janko Tipsarević (virus)

== WTA singles main-draw entrants ==
=== Seeds ===
Country	Player	Ranking	Seeds
POL	Agnieszka Radwańska	3	1
USA	Serena Williams	4	2
AUS	Samantha Stosur	5	3
CZE	Petra Kvitová	6	4
GER	Angelique Kerber	7	5
DEN	Caroline Wozniacki	8	6
ITA	Sara Errani	9	7
FRA	Marion Bartoli	10	8
CHN	Li Na	11	9
~~SRB~~	~~Ana Ivanovic~~	~~12~~	~~10~~
SVK	Dominika Cibulková	13	11
RUS	Maria Kirilenko	14	12
SRB	Jelena Janković	18	13
ITA	Francesca Schiavone	21	14
RUS	Nadia Petrova	22	15
CZE	Lucie Šafářová	23	16
RUS	Anastasia Pavlyuchenkova	24	17

=== Other entrants ===
The following players received wild cards into the main singles draw:

- (Italy) Camila Giorgi
- (United States) Sloane Stephens
- (United States) Venus Williams

The following players received entry from the singles qualifying draw:

- (Uzbekistan) Akgul Amanmuradova
- (Netherlands) Kiki Bertens
- (Greece) Eleni Daniilidou
- (Australia) Casey Dellacqua
- (Czech Republic) Andrea Hlaváčková
- (Kazakhstan) Sesil Karatantcheva
- (United States) Madison Keys
- (United States) Vania King
- (Sweden) Johanna Larsson
- (United States) Bethanie Mattek-Sands
- (Poland) Urszula Radwańska
- (Kazakhstan) Yaroslava Shvedova

The following players received entry as lucky losers:

- (Hungary) Tímea Babos
- (Georgia (country)) Anna Tatishvili

=== Withdrawals ===
- (Serbia) Ana Ivanovic (right foot injury)
- (Estonia) Kaia Kanepi (achilles heel injury)
- (Russia) Svetlana Kuznetsova (knee injury)
- (Germany) Sabine Lisicki (left abdominal sprain)
- (Romania) Monica Niculescu (hand injury)
- (Italy) Flavia Pennetta (wrist injury)
- (Germany) Andrea Petkovic (knee injury)
- (Russia) Maria Sharapova (stomach virus)
- (Russia) Vera Zvonareva (illness)

=== Retirements ===
- (Slovakia) Dominika Cibulková (right elbow injury)
- (United States) Christina McHale (gastrointestinal illness)
- (Austria) Tamira Paszek (migraine)
- (Russia) Nadia Petrova (dizziness)
- (Kazakhstan) Yaroslava Shvedova (heat illness)

== WTA doubles main-draw entrants ==
=== Seeds ===
Country	Player	Country	Player	Rank^{1}	Seed
USA	Liezel Huber	USA	Lisa Raymond	2	1
ITA	Sara Errani	ITA	Roberta Vinci	7	2
USA	Vania King	KAZ	Yaroslava Shvedova	11	3
RUS	Maria Kirilenko	RUS	Nadia Petrova	16	4
CZE	Andrea Hlaváčková	CZE	Lucie Hradecká	18	5
ESP	Nuria Llagostera Vives	ESP	María José Martínez Sánchez	37	6
USA	Raquel Kops-Jones	USA	Abigail Spears	39	7
SLO	Katarina Srebotnik	CHN	Zheng Jie	41	8

- ^{1} Rankings are as of August 6, 2012

=== Other entrants ===
The following pairs received wildcards into the doubles main draw:

- (Greece) Eleni Daniilidou / (China) Peng Shuai
- (Serbia) Jelena Janković / (Israel) Shahar Pe'er

The following pairs received entry as alternates:

- (Sweden) Sofia Arvidsson / (United States) Jill Craybas
- (Croatia) Darija Jurak / (Hungary) Katalin Marosi

=== Withdrawals ===
- (Russia) Nadia Petrova (dizziness)
- (Kazakhstan) Yaroslava Shvedova (heat illness)

=== Retirements ===
- (Slovakia) Dominika Cibulková (right elbow injury)
- (China) Peng Shuai (right shoulder injury)

== Finals ==
=== Men's singles ===
(Switzerland) Roger Federer defeated (Serbia) Novak Djokovic, 6–0, 7–6^{(9–7)}

- It was Roger Federer's 5th title in Cincinnati making him the only player in history ever to win this tournament five times. Federer won the event without dropping serve throughout the tournament.

=== Women's singles ===
(China) Li Na defeated (Germany) Angelique Kerber, 1–6, 6–3, 6–1

- It was Li Na's first title of the year and sixth of her career.

=== Men's doubles ===
(Sweden) Robert Lindstedt / (Romania) Horia Tecău defeated (India) Mahesh Bhupathi / (India) Rohan Bopanna, 6–4, 6–4

=== Women's doubles ===
(Czech Republic) Andrea Hlaváčková / (Czech Republic) Lucie Hradecká defeated (Slovenia) Katarina Srebotnik / (China) Zheng Jie, 6–1, 6–3
