= 2012 Sony Ericsson Open =

Coordinates: 25°42′29″N 80°09′32″W

- Date: March 19 – April 1
- Edition: 28th
- Category: Masters 1000 (ATP); Premier Mandatory (WTA)
- Surface: Hard - outdoor
- Location: Key Biscayne, Miami, United States
- Venue: Tennis Center at Crandon Park

Champions

Men's singles
- (Serbia) Novak Djokovic

Women's singles
- (Poland) Agnieszka Radwańska

Men's doubles
- (India) Leander Paes / (Czech Republic) Radek Štěpánek

Women's doubles
- (Russia) Maria Kirilenko / (Russia) Nadia Petrova
← 2011 ·	Miami Masters	· 2013 →

The 2012 Sony Ericsson Open (also known as 2012 Miami Masters), a men's and women's tennis tournament, was held from March 19 to April 1, 2012. It was the 28th edition of the Miami Masters event and played on outdoor hard courts at the Tennis Center at Crandon Park in Miami, United States. The tournament was a part of 2012 ATP World Tour and 2012 WTA Tour, classified as ATP World Tour Masters 1000 and Premier Mandatory event respectively.

== Finals ==
=== Men's singles ===
(Serbia) Novak Djokovic defeated (United Kingdom) Andy Murray, 6–1, 7–6^{(7–4)}

- It was Djokovic's 2nd title of the year and 30th of his career. It was his 3rd win in Miami, also winning in 2007 and 2011. It was his 1st Masters of the year and 11th of his career.

=== Women's singles ===
(Poland) Agnieszka Radwańska defeated (Russia) Maria Sharapova, 7–5, 6–4

- It was Radwańska's 2nd title of the year and 9th of her career. It was her 2nd Premier Mandatory-level tournament of her career and 5th Premier overall. At this point in the season, Radwańska only lost 4 times, which were all at the hands of No. 1 seed Victoria Azarenka. She was 26-0 versus all other opponents through the Sony Ericsson Open.

=== Men's doubles ===
(India) Leander Paes / (Czech Republic) Radek Štěpánek defeated (Belarus) Max Mirnyi / (Canada) Daniel Nestor 3–6, 6–1, [10–8]

=== Women's doubles ===
(Russia) Maria Kirilenko / (Russia) Nadia Petrova defeated (Italy) Sara Errani / (Italy) Roberta Vinci, 7–6^{(7–0)}, 4–6, [10–4]

== Points and prize money ==
=== Point distribution ===
Stage	Men's singles	Men's doubles	Women's singles	Women's doubles
Champion	1000			
Runner up	600		700	
Semifinals	360		450	
Quarterfinals	180		250	
Round of 16	90		140	
Round of 32	45		80	
Round of 64	25 (10)	0	50	0
Round of 128	10	–	5	–
Qualifier	16	–	30	–
Qualifying Finalist	8	–	20	–
Qualifying 1st round	0	–	1	–

=== Prize money ===
The total commitment prize money for this year's event was $4,828,050 each (WTA Tour and ATP World Tour).

Stage	Men's singles	Men's doubles	Women's singles	Women's doubles
Champion	$659,775	$216,190	$712,000	$241,010
Runner up	$321,990	$105,500	$352,000	$121,000
Semifinals	$161,375	$52,880	$164,000	$55,000
Quarterfinals	$82,270	$26,950	$79,000	$25,965
Round of 16	$43,370	$14,210	$39,000	$12,750
Round of 32	$23,210	$7,610	$21,000	$6,000
Round of 64	$12,530	–	$12,725	–
Round of 96	$7,680	–	$7,700	–

== Players ==
=== Men's singles ===
==== Seeds ====
Country	Player	Rank^{1}	Seed
SRB	Novak Djokovic	1	1
ESP	Rafael Nadal	2	2
SUI	Roger Federer	3	3
GBR	Andy Murray	4	4
ESP	David Ferrer	5	5
FRA	Jo-Wilfried Tsonga	6	6
CZE	Tomáš Berdych	7	7
USA	Mardy Fish	8	8
SRB	Janko Tipsarević	9	9
USA	John Isner	10	10
ARG	Juan Martín del Potro	11	11
ESP	Nicolás Almagro	12	12
FRA	Gilles Simon	13	13
FRA	Gaël Monfils	14	14
ESP	Feliciano López	15	15
JPN	Kei Nishikori	16	16
FRA	Richard Gasquet	17	17
UKR	Alexandr Dolgopolov	18	18
GER	Florian Mayer	19	19
ESP	Fernando Verdasco	20	20
ARG	Juan Mónaco	21	21
AUT	Jürgen Melzer	22	22
CRO	Marin Čilić	23	23
ESP	Marcel Granollers	24	24
CZE	Radek Štěpánek	25	25
CAN	Milos Raonic	26	26
SRB	Viktor Troicki	27	27
RSA	Kevin Anderson	28	28
ARG	Juan Ignacio Chela	32	29
FRA	Julien Benneteau	33	30
USA	Andy Roddick	34	31
GER	Philipp Kohlschreiber	35	32

- Rankings are as of March 19, 2012

==== Other entrants ====
The following players received wildcards into the main draw:

- (Chile) Fernando González
- (United States) Ryan Harrison
- (United States) Denis Kudla
- (United States) Jesse Levine
- (Australia) Marinko Matosevic

The following players received entry using a protected ranking into the main draw:

- (Germany) Benjamin Becker
- (Germany) Tommy Haas

The following players received entry from the qualifying draw:

- (Spain) Roberto Bautista Agut
- (Italy) Simone Bolelli
- (Ukraine) Sergei Bubka
- (France) Arnaud Clément
- (Canada) Frank Dancevic
- (Spain) Guillermo García López
- (Belgium) David Goffin
- (Germany) Björn Phau
- (United States) Rajeev Ram
- (France) Édouard Roger-Vasselin
- (France) Guillaume Rufin
- (Croatia) Antonio Veić

The following player received entry as a lucky loser:

- (Germany) Tobias Kamke

==== Withdrawals ====
- (Spain) Juan Carlos Ferrero → replaced by (Australia) Matthew Ebden
- (Italy) Fabio Fognini → replaced by (Germany) Benjamin Becker
- (Croatia) Ivan Ljubičić → replaced by (Bulgaria) Grigor Dimitrov
- (Portugal) Rui Machado → replaced by (Belgium) Steve Darcis
- (Spain) Albert Montañés → replaced by (Italy) Flavio Cipolla
- (Germany) Philipp Petzschner → replaced by (Germany) Tobias Kamke
- (Sweden) Robin Söderling (mononucleosis) → replaced by (Russia) Igor Kunitsyn
- (Russia) Dmitry Tursunov → replaced by (Argentina) David Nalbandian
- (Italy) Filippo Volandri → replaced by (United States) Sam Querrey
- (Switzerland) Stanislas Wawrinka → replaced by (France) Nicolas Mahut
- (Russia) Mikhail Youzhny → replaced by (Portugal) Frederico Gil

==== Retirements ====
- (Uzbekistan) Denis Istomin (illness)
- (Chinese Taipei) Yen-Hsun Lu (neck injury)
- (Spain) Rafael Nadal (left knee injury)
- (Canada) Milos Raonic (sprained right ankle)

=== Men's doubles ===
==== Seeds ====
Country	Player	Country	Player	Rank^{1}	Seed
USA	Bob Bryan	USA	Mike Bryan	2	1
BLR	Max Mirnyi	CAN	Daniel Nestor	6	2
FRA	Michaël Llodra	SRB	Nenad Zimonjić	11	3
SWE	Robert Lindstedt	ROU	Horia Tecău	17	4
IND	Mahesh Bhupathi	IND	Rohan Bopanna	20	5
POL	Mariusz Fyrstenberg	POL	Marcin Matkowski	25	6
IND	Leander Paes	CZE	Radek Štěpánek	27	7
CZE	František Čermák	SVK	Filip Polášek	40	8

- Rankings are as of March 19, 2012

==== Other entrants ====
The following pairs received wildcards into the doubles main draw:

- (United States) James Blake / (United States) Ryan Harrison
- (Australia) Paul Hanley / (Australia) Bernard Tomic

==== Retirements ====
- (Canada) Milos Raonic (ankle injury)

=== Women's singles ===
==== Seeds ====
Country	Player	Rank^{1}	Seed
BLR	Victoria Azarenka	1	1
RUS	Maria Sharapova	2	2
CZE	Petra Kvitová	3	3
DEN	Caroline Wozniacki	4	4
POL	Agnieszka Radwańska	5	5
AUS	Samantha Stosur	6	6
FRA	Marion Bartoli	7	7
CHN	Li Na	8	8
RUS	Vera Zvonareva	9	9
USA	Serena Williams	11	10
ITA	Francesca Schiavone	12	11
GER	Sabine Lisicki	13	14
SRB	Jelena Janković	14	13
GER	Julia Görges	15	14
SRB	Ana Ivanovic	16	15
SVK	Dominika Cibulková	17	16
CHN	Peng Shuai	18	17
GER	Angelique Kerber	19	18
RUS	Anastasia Pavlyuchenkova	20	19
SVK	Daniela Hantuchová	21	20
ITA	Roberta Vinci	22	21
RUS	Maria Kirilenko	23	22
BEL	Yanina Wickmayer	24	23
ITA	Flavia Pennetta	25	24
ESP	Anabel Medina Garrigues	26	25
RUS	Svetlana Kuznetsova	27	26
CZE	Lucie Šafářová	28	27
ROU	Monica Niculescu	29	28
CZE	Petra Cetkovská	30	29
ITA	Sara Errani	31	30
EST	Kaia Kanepi	32	31
RUS	Nadia Petrova	33	32

- Rankings are as of March 5, 2012

==== Other entrants ====
The following players received wildcards into the main draw:

- (Serbia) Bojana Jovanovski
- (Russia) Alisa Kleybanova
- (Spain) Garbiñe Muguruza Blanco
- (Australia) Olivia Rogowska
- (United Kingdom) Heather Watson
- (United States) Venus Williams
- (Canada) Aleksandra Wozniak
- (China) Zhang Shuai

The following players received entry from the qualifying draw:

- (Czech Republic) Eva Birnerová
- (Ukraine) Kateryna Bondarenko
- (France) Alizé Cornet
- (Hungary) Melinda Czink
- (Japan) Misaki Doi
- (Russia) Vera Dushevina
- (France) Stéphanie Foretz Gacon
- (United States) Jamie Hampton
- (United States) Madison Keys
- (Poland) Urszula Radwańska
- (Russia) Valeria Savinykh
- (United States) Sloane Stephens

==== Withdrawals ====
- (Russia) Anna Chakvetadze → replaced by (Japan) Kimiko Date-Krumm
- (Romania) Alexandra Dulgheru → replaced by (Netherlands) Michaëlla Krajicek
- (Canada) Rebecca Marino → replaced by (Hungary) Gréta Arn
- (Spain) María José Martínez Sánchez → replaced by (Greece) Eleni Daniilidou
- (United States) Bethanie Mattek-Sands → replaced by (Spain) Lourdes Domínguez Lino
- (Switzerland) Romina Oprandi → replaced by (Spain) Sílvia Soler Espinosa
- (Germany) Andrea Petkovic → replaced by (Georgia (country)) Anna Tatishvili

==== Retirements ====
- (Japan) Ayumi Morita (shoulder injury)
- (Austria) Tamira Paszek (back injury)

=== Women's doubles ===
==== Seeds ====
Country	Player	Country	Player	Rank^{1}	Seed
USA	Liezel Huber	USA	Lisa Raymond	3	1
CZE	Květa Peschke	SLO	Katarina Srebotnik	6	2
IND	Sania Mirza	RUS	Elena Vesnina	15	3
CZE	Andrea Hlaváčková	CZE	Lucie Hradecká	21	4
RUS	Maria Kirilenko	RUS	Nadia Petrova	25	5
ITA	Sara Errani	ITA	Roberta Vinci	29	6
KAZ	Yaroslava Shvedova	KAZ	Galina Voskoboeva	37	7
SVK	Daniela Hantuchová	POL	Agnieszka Radwańska	37	8

- Rankings are as of March 5, 2012

==== Other entrants ====
The following pairs received wildcards into the doubles main draw:

- (Slovakia) Dominika Cibulková / (Serbia) Jelena Janković
- (Argentina) Gisela Dulko / (Argentina) Paola Suárez
- (Germany) Anna-Lena Grönefeld / (Czech Republic) Petra Kvitová
- (Russia) Anastasia Pavlyuchenkova / (Czech Republic) Lucie Šafářová
