= 2012 Italian Open (tennis) =

- Date: 14–21 May
- Edition: 69th
- Category: World Tour Masters 1000; Premier 5
- Surface: Clay / outdoor
- Location: Rome, Italy
- Venue: Foro Italico

Champions

Men's singles
- (Spain) Rafael Nadal

Women's singles
- (Russia) Maria Sharapova

Men's doubles
- (Spain) Marcel Granollers / (Spain) Marc López

Women's doubles
- (Italy) Sara Errani / (Italy) Roberta Vinci
- Italian Open

The 2012 Italian Open (also known as the 2012 Rome Masters and sponsored title 2012 Internazionali BNL d'Italia) was a tennis tournament, being played on outdoor clay courts at the Foro Italico in Rome, Italy. It was the 69th edition of the Italian Open and was classified as an ATP World Tour Masters 1000 event on the 2012 ATP World Tour and a Premier 5 event on the 2012 WTA Tour. It took place from 14 to 21 May 2012, because rain delayed the men's final to Monday.

== Points and prize money ==
=== Point distribution ===
Stage	Men's singles	Men's doubles	Women's singles	Women's doubles
Champion	1000		900	
Runner up	600		620	
Semifinals	360		395	
Quarterfinals	180		225	
Round of 16	90		125	
Round of 32	45	10	70	1
Round of 64	10	–	1	–
Qualifier	25	–	30	–
Qualifying Finalist	16	–	20	–
Qualifying 1st round	0	–	1	–

=== Prize money ===
Stage	Men's singles	Men's doubles	Women's singles	Women's doubles
Champion	€460,260	€142,500	$385,000	$110,000
Runner up	€225,680	€69,780	$192,000	$55,000
Semifinals	€113,580	€35,000	$95,100	$27,525
Quarterfinals	€57,755	€17,970	$44,250	$13,850
Round of 16	€30,000	€9,290	$22,000	$7,000
Round of 32	€15,810	€4,900	$11,300	$3,500
Round of 64	€8,535	–	$5,800	–
Final round qualifying	€1,965	–	$3,200	–
First round qualifying	€1,000	–	$1,650	–

== ATP singles main draw entrants ==
=== Seeds ===
Country	Player	Rank^{1}	Seed
SRB	Novak Djokovic	1	1
SUI	Roger Federer	2	3
ESP	Rafael Nadal	3	2
GBR	Andy Murray	4	4
FRA	Jo-Wilfried Tsonga	5	5
ESP	David Ferrer	6	6
CZE	Tomáš Berdych	7	7
SRB	Janko Tipsarević	8	8
USA	John Isner	10	9
ARG	Juan Martín del Potro	11	10
FRA	Gilles Simon	12	11
ESP	Nicolás Almagro	13	12
FRA	Gaël Monfils	14	13
ARG	Juan Mónaco	15	14
ESP	Feliciano López	16	15
FRA	Richard Gasquet	18	16

- Rankings are as of 15 May 2012

=== Other entrants ===
The following players received wildcards into the main draw:

- (Italy) Fabio Fognini
- (Italy) Paolo Lorenzi
- (Italy) Potito Starace
- (Italy) Filippo Volandri

The following players received entry from the qualifying draw:

- (Spain) Guillermo García-López
- (Colombia) Santiago Giraldo
- (Netherlands) Robin Haase
- (Slovenia) Blaž Kavčič
- (United States) Sam Querrey
- (Spain) Albert Ramos
- (Romania) Adrian Ungur

=== Withdrawals ===
- (United States) Mardy Fish
- (Japan) Kei Nishikori (stomach injury)
- (Sweden) Robin Söderling (mononucleosis)

=== Retirements ===
- (Ukraine) Alexandr Dolgopolov

== ATP doubles main draw entrants ==
=== Seeds ===
Country	Player	Country	Player	Rank^{1}	Seed
BLR	Max Mirnyi	CAN	Daniel Nestor	6	1
USA	Bob Bryan	USA	Mike Bryan	6	2
FRA	Michaël Llodra	SRB	Nenad Zimonjić	11	3
SWE	Robert Lindstedt	ROU	Horia Tecău	17	4
IND	Leander Paes	CZE	Marcin Matkowski	20	5
POL	Mariusz Fyrstenberg	POL	Radek Štěpánek	20	6
IND	Mahesh Bhupathi	IND	Rohan Bopanna	27	7
AUT	Alexander Peya	PAK	Aisam-ul-Haq Qureshi	32	8

- Rankings are as of 15 May 2012

=== Other entrants ===
The following pairs received wildcards into the doubles main draw:

- (Italy) Flavio Cipolla / (Italy) Paolo Lorenzi
- (Italy) Gianluca Naso / (Italy) Filippo Volandri

=== Retirements ===
- (Spain) Pablo Andújar

== WTA singles main draw entrants ==
=== Seeds ===
Country	Player	Rank^{1}	Seed
BLR	Victoria Azarenka	1	1
RUS	Maria Sharapova	2	2
POL	Agnieszka Radwańska	3	3
CZE	Petra Kvitová	4	4
AUS	Samantha Stosur	5	5
DEN	Caroline Wozniacki	6	6
FRA	Marion Bartoli	7	7
CHN	Li Na	8	8
USA	Serena Williams	9	9
ITA	Francesca Schiavone	11	10
GER	Sabine Lisicki	13	11
GER	Angelique Kerber	14	12
SRB	Ana Ivanovic	15	13
SVK	Dominika Cibulková	16	14
SRB	Jelena Janković	18	15
RUS	Maria Kirilenko	19	16

- Rankings are as of 7 May 2012

=== Other entrants ===
The following players received wildcards into the main draw:

- (Italy) Alberta Brianti
- (Italy) Karin Knapp
- (United States) Venus Williams

The following players received entry from the qualifying draw:

- (Russia) Anna Chakvetadze
- (Belarus) Olga Govortsova
- (Czech Republic) Andrea Hlaváčková
- (Croatia) Mirjana Lučić
- (Australia) Anastasia Rodionova
- (Spain) Silvia Soler Espinosa
- (United States) Sloane Stephens
- (Canada) Aleksandra Wozniak

=== Withdrawals ===
- (Germany) Mona Barthel
- (Slovakia) Daniela Hantuchová (foot injury)
- (Estonia) Kaia Kanepi (foot injury)
- (Germany) Andrea Petkovic (ankle injury)
- (Russia) Vera Zvonareva

== WTA doubles main draw entrants ==
=== Seeds ===
Country	Player	Country	Player	Rank^{1}	Seed
USA	Liezel Huber	USA	Lisa Raymond	2	1
CZE	Květa Peschke	SLO	Katarina Srebotnik	7	2
ITA	Sara Errani	ITA	Roberta Vinci	25	3
CZE	Andrea Hlaváčková	AUS	Anastasia Rodionova	26	4
RUS	Maria Kirilenko	RUS	Nadia Petrova	27	5
GER	Julia Görges	USA	Vania King	37	6
RSA	Natalie Grandin	CZE	Vladimíra Uhlířová	45	7
USA	Raquel Kops-Jones	USA	Abigail Spears	48	8

- ^{1} Rankings are as of 7 May 2012

=== Other entrants ===
The following pairs received wildcards into the doubles main draw:

- (Italy) Nastassja Burnett / (Italy) Alexa Virgili
- (Italy) Maria Elena Camerin / (Italy) Karin Knapp

The following pair received entry as alternates:

- (United States) Jill Craybas / (United States) Sloane Stephens

=== Withdrawals ===
- (Czech Republic) Andrea Hlaváčková (right thigh injury)

=== Retirements ===
- (Slovakia) Janette Husárová (low back injury)
- (Italy) Flavia Pennetta (right wrist injury)
- (China) Peng Shuai (left hand injury)

== Finals ==
=== Men's singles ===
- (Spain) Rafael Nadal defeated (Serbia) Novak Djokovic, 7–5, 6–3

=== Women's singles ===
- (Russia) Maria Sharapova defeated (China) Li Na, 4–6, 6–4, 7–6^{(7–5)}

=== Men's doubles ===
- (Spain) Marcel Granollers / (Spain) Marc López defeated (Poland) Łukasz Kubot / (Serbia) Janko Tipsarević, 6–3, 6–2

=== Women's doubles ===
- (Italy) Sara Errani / (Italy) Roberta Vinci defeated (Russia) Ekaterina Makarova / (Russia) Elena Vesnina, 6–2, 7–5
