= 2012 Davis Cup World Group =

2012 edition of the Davis Cup World Group

- Date: 10 February – 18 November
- Edition: 32nd

Champions
- Czech Republic
← 2011 ·	Davis Cup	· 2013 →

The World Group was the highest level of Davis Cup competition in 2012. The first round losers went into the Davis Cup World Group play-offs and the winners progress to the quarterfinals. The quarterfinalists were guaranteed a World Group spot for 2013.

The competition was won by the Czech Republic who defeated Spain in the final.

== Participating teams ==
Participating teams
Argentina	Austria	Canada	Croatia
Czech Republic	France	Germany	Italy
Japan	Kazakhstan	Russia	Serbia
Spain	Sweden	Switzerland	United States

== Seeds ==
1. Spain (final)
2. Argentina (semifinals)
3. Serbia (quarterfinals)
4. France (quarterfinals)
5. Czech Republic (champion)
6. United States (semifinals)
7. Croatia (quarterfinals)
8. Russia (first round)

== Draw ==
First round 10–12 February
Oviedo, Spain (indoor clay)
1	Spain	5
Kazakhstan	0
Wiener Neustadt, Austria (indoor hard)
8	Russia	2
Austria	3
Vancouver, Canada (indoor hard)
4	France	4
Canada	1
Fribourg, Switzerland (indoor clay)
6	United States	5
Switzerland	0
Ostrava, Czech Republic (indoor hard)
Italy	1
5	Czech Republic	4
Niš, Serbia (indoor hard)
Sweden	1
3	Serbia	4
Miki, Japan (indoor hard)
Japan	2
7	Croatia	3
Bamberg, Germany (indoor clay)
Germany	1
2	Argentina	4

Quarterfinals; 6–8 April
Oropesa del Mar, Spain (clay)
1	Spain	4
Austria	1
Roquebrune-Cap-Martin, France (clay)
4	France	2
6	United States	3
Prague, Czech Republic (indoor clay)
5	Czech Republic	4
3	Serbia	1
Buenos Aires, Argentina (clay)
7	Croatia	1
2	Argentina	4

Semifinals; 14–16 September
Gijón, Spain (clay)
1	Spain	3
6	United States	1
Buenos Aires, Argentina (clay)
5	Czech Republic	3
2	Argentina	2

Final; 16–18 November
Prague, Czech Republic (indoor hard)
1	Spain	2
5	Czech Republic	3

== First round ==
=== Spain vs. Kazakhstan ===
Spain
5
Palacio Municipal de Deportes, Oviedo, Spain
10–12 February 2012
Clay (i)

Kazakhstan
0

			1	2	3	4	5
1	(Spain) (Kazakhstan)	Juan Carlos Ferrero; Mikhail Kukushkin	6; 1	4; 6	7^{7} 6^{2}	4; 6	6; 4
2	(Spain) (Kazakhstan)	Nicolás Almagro; Andrey Golubev	6; 3	4; 6	6; 1	6; 1
3	(Spain) (Kazakhstan)	Marcel Granollers / Marc López; Evgeny Korolev / Yuri Schukin	6; 2	6; 3	6; 1
4	(Spain) (Kazakhstan)	Nicolás Almagro; Evgeny Korolev	6; 3	6; 4
5	(Spain) (Kazakhstan)	Marcel Granollers; Andrey Golubev	6; 3	6^{2} 7^{7}	6; 3

=== Austria vs. Russia ===
Austria
3
Arena Nova, Wiener Neustadt, Austria
10–12 February 2012
Hard (i)

Russia
2

			1	2	3	4	5
1	(Austria) (Russia)	Jürgen Melzer; Igor Kunitsyn	6; 2	6^{3} 7^{7}	6; 4	3; 6	6; 1
2	(Austria) (Russia)	Andreas Haider-Maurer; Alex Bogomolov, Jr.	6; 1	6; 4	6^{1} 7^{7}	6; 2
3	(Austria) (Russia)	Oliver Marach / Alexander Peya; Nikolay Davydenko / Mikhail Youzhny	6^{1} 7^{7}	7^{9} 6^{7}	5; 7	6; 3	4; 6
4	(Austria) (Russia)	Jürgen Melzer; Alex Bogomolov, Jr.	6; 2	6; 4	6; 1
5	(Austria) (Russia)	Andreas Haider-Maurer; Igor Kunitsyn	4; 6	6; 4	6^{4} 7^{7}

=== Canada vs. France ===
Canada
1
Doug Mitchell Thunderbird Sports Centre, Vancouver, Canada
10–12 February 2012
Hard (i)

France
4

			1	2	3	4	5
1	(Canada) (France)	Vasek Pospisil; Jo-Wilfried Tsonga	1; 6	3; 6	3; 6
2	(Canada) (France)	Milos Raonic; Julien Benneteau	6; 2	6; 4	7; 5
3	(Canada) (France)	Daniel Nestor / Milos Raonic; Julien Benneteau / Michaël Llodra	6^{1} 7^{7}	6^{2} 7^{7}	3; 6
4	(Canada) (France)	Frank Dancevic; Jo-Wilfried Tsonga	4; 6	4; 6	1; 6
5	(Canada) (France)	Vasek Pospisil; Gaël Monfils	4; 6	4; 6

=== Switzerland vs. United States ===
Switzerland
0
Forum Fribourg, Fribourg, Switzerland
10–12 February 2012
Clay (i)

United States
5

			1	2	3	4	5
1	(Switzerland) (United States)	Stanislas Wawrinka; Mardy Fish	2; 6	6; 4	6; 4	1; 6	7; 9
2	(Switzerland) (United States)	Roger Federer; John Isner	6; 4	3; 6	6^{4} 7^{7}	2; 6
3	(Switzerland) (United States)	Roger Federer / Stanislas Wawrinka; Mike Bryan / Mardy Fish	6; 4	3; 6	3; 6	3; 6
4	(Switzerland) (United States)	Michael Lammer; Ryan Harrison	6^{0} 7^{7}	6^{4} 7^{7}
5	(Switzerland) (United States)	Marco Chiudinelli; John Isner	3; 6	4; 6

=== Czech Republic vs. Italy ===
Czech Republic
4
ČEZ Aréna, Ostrava, Czech Republic
10–12 February 2012
Hard (i)

Italy
1

			1	2	3	4	5
1	(Czech Republic) (Italy)	Radek Štěpánek; Andreas Seppi	4; 6	6; 4	6; 3	3; 6	6; 3
2	(Czech Republic) (Italy)	Tomáš Berdych; Simone Bolelli	6; 3	4; 6	7; 5	6; 2
3	(Czech Republic) (Italy)	Tomáš Berdych / Radek Štěpánek; Daniele Bracciali / Potito Starace	6; 3	6; 4	6; 2
4	(Czech Republic) (Italy)	Lukáš Rosol; Andreas Seppi	4; 6	6; 3	6; 4
5	(Czech Republic) (Italy)	František Čermák; Simone Bolelli	4; 6	4; 6

=== Serbia vs. Sweden ===
Serbia
4
Hala Čair, Niš, Serbia
10–12 February 2012
Hard (i)

Sweden
1

			1	2	3	4	5
1	(Serbia) (Sweden)	Janko Tipsarević; Filip Prpic	6; 3	6; 3	6; 4
2	(Serbia) (Sweden)	Viktor Troicki; Michael Ryderstedt	6; 4	6; 3	5; 7	6; 3
3	(Serbia) (Sweden)	Janko Tipsarević / Nenad Zimonjić; Johan Brunström / Robert Lindstedt	6; 3	3; 6	6^{4} 7^{7}	7^{7} 6^{3}	8; 10
4	(Serbia) (Sweden)	Janko Tipsarević; Michael Ryderstedt	6; 2	7^{7} 6^{5}	7; 5
5	(Serbia) (Sweden)	Dušan Lajović; Filip Prpic	6; 4	6; 4

=== Japan vs. Croatia ===
Japan
2
Bourbon Beans Dome, Miki, Japan
10–12 February 2012
Hard (i)

Croatia
3

			1	2	3	4	5
1	(Japan) (Croatia)	Go Soeda; Ivan Dodig	6^{3} 7^{7}	3; 6	6; 4	6; 3	7; 5
2	(Japan) (Croatia)	Kei Nishikori; Ivo Karlović	4; 6	4; 6	3; 6
3	(Japan) (Croatia)	Tatsuma Ito / Yuichi Sugita; Ivan Dodig / Ivo Karlović	4; 6	4; 6	6; 3	3; 6
4	(Japan) (Croatia)	Kei Nishikori; Ivan Dodig	7; 5	7^{7} 6^{4}	6; 3
5	(Japan) (Croatia)	Go Soeda; Ivo Karlović	6^{4} 7^{7}	1; 6	4; 6

=== Germany vs. Argentina ===
Germany
1
Stechert Arena, Bamberg, Germany
10–12 February 2012
Clay (i)

Argentina
4

			1	2	3	4	5
1	(Germany) (Argentina)	Philipp Petzschner; Juan Mónaco	3; 6	3; 6	3; 6
2	(Germany) (Argentina)	Florian Mayer; David Nalbandian	6; 2	0; 6	1; 6	6^{5} 7^{7}
3	(Germany) (Argentina)	Tommy Haas / Philipp Petzschner; David Nalbandian / Eduardo Schwank	6; 3	6; 4	4; 6	3; 6	4; 6
4	(Germany) (Argentina)	Florian Mayer; Juan Ignacio Chela	5; 7	5; 7
5	(Germany) (Argentina)	Cedrik-Marcel Stebe; Eduardo Schwank	7^{7} 6^{1}	7; 5

== Quarterfinals ==
=== Spain vs. Austria ===
Spain
4
Marina d'Or, Oropesa del Mar, Spain
6–8 April 2012
Clay

Austria
1

			1	2	3	4	5
1	(Spain) (Austria)	Nicolás Almagro; Jürgen Melzer	6; 2	6; 2	6; 4
2	(Spain) (Austria)	David Ferrer; Andreas Haider-Maurer	6; 1	6; 3	6; 1
3	(Spain) (Austria)	Marcel Granollers / Marc López; Oliver Marach / Alexander Peya	6; 3	4; 6	4; 6	6^{12} 7^{14}
4	(Spain) (Austria)	David Ferrer; Jürgen Melzer	7; 5	6; 3	6; 3
5	(Spain) (Austria)	Nicolás Almagro; Alexander Peya	7; 5	7; 5

=== France vs. United States ===
France
2
Monte Carlo Country Club, Roquebrune, France
6–8 April 2012
Clay

United States
3

			1	2	3	4	5
1	(France) (United States)	Jo-Wilfried Tsonga; Ryan Harrison	7; 5	6; 2	2; 6	6; 2
2	(France) (United States)	Gilles Simon; John Isner	3; 6	2; 6	5; 7
3	(France) (United States)	Julien Benneteau / Michaël Llodra; Bob Bryan / Mike Bryan	4; 6	4; 6	6^{4} 7^{7}
4	(France) (United States)	Jo-Wilfried Tsonga; John Isner	3; 6	6^{4} 7^{7}	7; 5	3; 6
5	(France) (United States)	Gilles Simon; Ryan Harrison	6; 2	6; 3

=== Czech Republic vs. Serbia ===
Czech Republic
4
O2 Arena, Prague, Czech Republic
6–8 April 2012
Clay (i)

Serbia
1

			1	2	3	4	5
1	(Czech Republic) (Serbia)	Tomáš Berdych; Viktor Troicki	6; 2	6; 1	6; 2
2	(Czech Republic) (Serbia)	Radek Štěpánek; Janko Tipsarević	7; 5	4; 6	4; 6	6; 4	7; 9
3	(Czech Republic) (Serbia)	Tomáš Berdych / Radek Štěpánek; Ilija Bozoljac / Nenad Zimonjić	6; 4	6; 2	7^{7} 6^{4}
4	(Czech Republic) (Serbia)	Tomáš Berdych; Janko Tipsarević	7^{8} 6^{6}	7^{8} 6^{6}	7^{9} 6^{7}
5	(Czech Republic) (Serbia)	Lukáš Rosol; Viktor Troicki	7^{7} 6^{5}	7; 5

=== Argentina vs. Croatia ===
Argentina
4
Parque Roca, Buenos Aires, Argentina
6–8 April 2012
Clay

Croatia
1

			1	2	3	4	5
1	(Argentina) (Croatia)	David Nalbandian; Marin Čilić	7; 5	4; 6	6; 4	6^{2} 7^{7}	3; 6
2	(Argentina) (Croatia)	Juan Martín del Potro; Ivo Karlović	6; 2	7^{9} 6^{7}	6; 1
3	(Argentina) (Croatia)	David Nalbandian / Eduardo Schwank; Marin Čilić / Ivo Karlović	3; 6	7^{8} 6^{6}	6; 3	6^{6} 7^{8}	8; 6
4	(Argentina) (Croatia)	Juan Martín del Potro; Marin Čilić	6; 1	6; 2	6; 1
5	(Argentina) (Croatia)	Juan Mónaco; Antonio Veić	6; 1	6; 1

== Semifinals ==
=== Spain vs. United States ===
Spain
3
Parque Hermanos Castro, Gijón, Spain
14–16 September 2012
Clay

United States
1

			1	2	3	4	5
1	(Spain) (United States)	David Ferrer; Sam Querrey	4; 6	6; 2	6; 2	6; 4
2	(Spain) (United States)	Nicolás Almagro; John Isner	6; 4	4; 6	6; 4	3; 6	7; 5
3	(Spain) (United States)	Marcel Granollers / Marc López; Bob Bryan / Mike Bryan	3; 6	6; 3	5; 7	5; 7
4	(Spain) (United States)	David Ferrer; John Isner	6^{2} 7^{7}	6; 3	6; 4	6; 2
5	(Spain) (United States)	Nicolás Almagro; Sam Querrey						not played

=== Argentina vs. Czech Republic ===
Argentina
2
Parque Roca, Buenos Aires, Argentina
14–16 September 2012
Clay

Czech Republic
3

			1	2	3	4	5
1	(Argentina) (Czech Republic)	Juan Martín del Potro; Radek Štěpánek	6; 4	6; 4	6; 2
2	(Argentina) (Czech Republic)	Juan Mónaco; Tomáš Berdych	1; 6	6; 4	6; 1	4; 6	4; 6
3	(Argentina) (Czech Republic)	Carlos Berlocq / Eduardo Schwank; Tomáš Berdych / Radek Štěpánek	3; 6	4; 6	3; 6
4	(Argentina) (Czech Republic)	Carlos Berlocq; Tomáš Berdych	3; 6	3; 6	4; 6
5	(Argentina) (Czech Republic)	Juan Mónaco; Ivo Minář	6; 3	7^{7} 6^{2}

== Final ==
=== Czech Republic vs. Spain ===
Czech Republic
3
O_{2} Arena, Prague, Czech Republic
16–18 November 2012
Hard (i)

Spain
2

			1	2	3	4	5
1	(Czech Republic) (Spain)	Radek Štěpánek; David Ferrer	3; 6	4; 6	4; 6
2	(Czech Republic) (Spain)	Tomáš Berdych; Nicolás Almagro	6; 3	3; 6	6; 3	6^{5} 7^{7}	6; 3
3	(Czech Republic) (Spain)	Tomáš Berdych / Radek Štěpánek; Marcel Granollers / Marc López	3; 6	7; 5	7; 5	6; 3
4	(Czech Republic) (Spain)	Tomáš Berdych; David Ferrer	2; 6	3; 6	5; 7
5	(Czech Republic) (Spain)	Radek Štěpánek; Nicolás Almagro	6; 4	7^{7} 6^{0}	3; 6	6; 3
