= 2012 ABN AMRO World Tennis Tournament – Singles =

Singles
- 2012 ABN AMRO World Tennis Tournament

Final
- Champion: (Switzerland) Roger Federer
- Runner-up: (Argentina) Juan Martín del Potro
- Score: 6–1, 6–4

Details
- Draw: 32 (4 Q / 3 WC )
- Seeds: 8

Events
Singles	Doubles
- ABN AMRO World Tennis Tournament

Robin Söderling was the defending champion but could not defend his title because of a bout of mononucleosis.
Roger Federer won the title beating Juan Martín del Potro 6–1, 6–4 in the final.

== Seeds ==
1. (Switzerland) Roger Federer (champion)
2. (Czech Republic) Tomáš Berdych (semifinals)
3. (Argentina) Juan Martín del Potro (final)
4. (Spain) Feliciano López (first round)
5. (France) Richard Gasquet (quarterfinals)
6. (Ukraine) Alexandr Dolgopolov (first round)
7. (Serbia) Viktor Troicki (quarterfinals)
8. (Spain) Marcel Granollers (first round)

== Draw ==
Key

- Q = Qualifier
- WC = Wild card
- LL = Lucky loser
- Alt = Alternate
- ITF = ITF entry
- PR = Protected ranking
- SR = Special ranking
- SE = Special exempt
- JE = Junior exempt
- JR = Junior Accelerator Programme entrant
- CO = College Accelerator Programme entrant
- NG = Next Gen Accelerator Program entrant
- w/o = Walkover
- r = Retired
- d = Defaulted

=== Finals ===
Semifinals
1	(Switzerland) Roger Federer	4	6	6
(Russia) Nikolay Davydenko	6	3	4
3	(Argentina) Juan Martín del Potro	6	6
2	(Czech Republic) Tomáš Berdych	3	1

Final
1	(Switzerland) Roger Federer	6	6
3	(Argentina) Juan Martín del Potro	1	4

=== Top half ===
First round
1	(Switzerland) R Federer	6	6
(France) N Mahut	4	4
(Russia) M Youzhny	6	6^{4}	6
(Russia) I Kunitsyn	0	7^{7}	0
WC	(Netherlands) I Sijsling	1	7^{9}	5
(Finland) J Nieminen	6	6^{7}	7
(Poland) Ł Kubot	6^{4}	6	6
6	(Ukraine) A Dolgopolov	7^{7}	4	2
4	(Spain) F López	6	6^{5}	4
Q	(France) P-H Mathieu	4	7^{7}	6
(Netherlands) R Haase	5	2
(Russia) N Davydenko	7	6
(Russia) A Bogomolov Jr.	6	0
(Ukraine) S Stakhovsky	3	1^{r}
(Italy) F Cipolla	3	6	1
5	(France) R Gasquet	6	1	6

Second round
1	(Switzerland) R Federer	w/o
(Russia) M Youzhny
(Finland) J Nieminen	6	5	7^{7}
(Poland) Ł Kubot	3	7	6^{2}
Q	(France) P-H Mathieu	4	7^{9}	1
(Russia) N Davydenko	6	6^{7}	6
(Russia) A Bogomolov Jr.	3	2
5	(France) R Gasquet	6	6

Quarterfinals
1	(Switzerland) R Federer	7	7^{7}
(Finland) J Nieminen	5	6^{2}
(Russia) N Davydenko	7	6
5	(France) R Gasquet	5	3

Semifinals
1	(Switzerland) R Federer	4	6	6
(Russia) N Davydenko	6	3	4

=== Bottom half ===
First round
7	(Serbia) V Troicki	7^{8}	6
WC	(Netherlands) T de Bakker	6^{6}	3
WC	(Netherlands) J Huta Galung	7^{8}	6
(Croatia) I Ljubičić	6^{6}	3
Q	(Slovakia) K Beck	7^{8}	6
(Germany) P Petzschner	6^{6}	3
(France) M Llodra	4	7^{7}	4
3	(Argentina) JM del Potro	6	6^{3}	6
8	(Spain) M Granollers	1	6	4
(Germany) P Kohlschreiber	6	1	6
Q	(South Africa) R de Voest	6	6^{5}	2
(Italy) A Seppi	1	7^{7}	6
Q	(Germany) M Bachinger	6^{2}	2
(Cyprus) M Baghdatis	7^{7}	6
(Czech Republic) L Rosol	4	2
2	(Czech Republic) T Berdych	6	6

Second round
7	(Serbia) V Troicki	7^{7}	6
WC	(Netherlands) J Huta Galung	6^{2}	3
Q	(Slovakia) K Beck	4	5
3	(Argentina) JM del Potro	6	7
(Germany) P Kohlschreiber	4	2
(Italy) A Seppi	6	6
(Cyprus) M Baghdatis	0^{r}
2	(Czech Republic) T Berdych	3

Quarterfinals
7	(Serbia) V Troicki	0	1
3	(Argentina) JM del Potro	6	6
(Italy) A Seppi	3	4
2	(Czech Republic) T Berdych	6	6

Semifinals
3	(Argentina) JM del Potro	6	6
2	(Czech Republic) T Berdych	3	1

== Qualifying ==
=== Seeds ===
1. (Germany) Matthias Bachinger (qualified)
2. (Slovakia) Karol Beck (qualified)
3. (Germany) Michael Berrer (first round)
4. (South Africa) Rik de Voest (qualified)
5. (Germany) Daniel Brands (first round)
6. (Belgium) Ruben Bemelmans (first round)
7. (Netherlands) Thomas Schoorel (qualifying round)
8. (Czech Republic) Jan Hájek (qualifying round)

=== Qualifiers ===
1. (Slovakia) Karol Beck
2. (Germany) Matthias Bachinger
3. (France) Paul-Henri Mathieu
4. (South Africa) Rik de Voest

== Qualifying draw ==
=== First qualifier ===
First round
1	(Germany) Matthias Bachinger	7^{7}	6
(Italy) Matteo Viola	6^{5}	0
(Czech Republic) Dušan Lojda	6	6^{5}	6
5	(Germany) Daniel Brands	0	7^{7}	3

Qualifying Round
1	(Germany) Matthias Bachinger	7^{7}	6
(Czech Republic) Dušan Lojda	6^{1}	3

=== Second qualifier ===
First round
2	(Slovakia) Karol Beck	7	6
(Germany) Dominik Meffert	5	2
(Netherlands) Lennert van der Linden	1	1
8	(Czech Republic) Jan Hájek	6	6

Qualifying Round
2	(Slovakia) Karol Beck	4	6	7
8	(Czech Republic) Jan Hájek	6	3	5

=== Third qualifier ===
First round
3	(Germany) Michael Berrer	1	3
WC	(France) Paul-Henri Mathieu	6	6
(Czech Republic) Ivo Minář	2	4
7/WC	(Netherlands) Thomas Schoorel	6	6

Qualifying Round
WC	(France) Paul-Henri Mathieu	6	6
7/WC	(Netherlands) Thomas Schoorel	1	4

=== Fourth qualifier ===
First round
4	(South Africa) Rik de Voest	6	6
WC	(Netherlands) Alban Meuffels	3	2
(Germany) Simon Greul	6	6
6	(Belgium) Ruben Bemelmans	2	4

Qualifying Round
4	(South Africa) Rik de Voest	7	7^{7}
(Germany) Simon Greul	5	6^{4}
