= 2012 ABN AMRO World Tennis Tournament – Doubles =

Doubles
- 2012 ABN AMRO World Tennis Tournament

Final
- Champions: (France) Michaël Llodra (Serbia) Nenad Zimonjić
- Runners-up: (Sweden) Robert Lindstedt (Romania) Horia Tecău
- Score: 4–6, 7–5, [16–14]

Events
Singles	Doubles
← 2011 ·	ABN AMRO World Tennis Tournament	· 2013 →

Jürgen Melzer and Philipp Petzschner were the defending champions but Melzer decided not to participate.
Petzschner played alongside Juan Martín del Potro but lost in the quarterfinals.
Michaël Llodra and Nenad Zimonjić won the title Robert Lindstedt and Horia Tecău 4–6, 7–5, [16–14] in the final.

== Seeds ==
1. (Belarus) Max Mirnyi / (Canada) Daniel Nestor (first round)
2. (France) Michaël Llodra / (Serbia) Nenad Zimonjić (champions)
3. (Sweden) Robert Lindstedt/ (Romania) Horia Tecău (final)
4. (India) Mahesh Bhupathi / (India) Rohan Bopanna (first round)

== Draw ==
=== Key ===
- Q = Qualifier
- WC = Wild card
- LL = Lucky loser
- Alt = Alternate
- SE = Special exempt
- PR = Protected ranking
- ITF = ITF entry
- JE = Junior exempt
- w/o = Walkover
- r = Retired
- d = Defaulted
- SR = Special ranking

=== Draw ===
First round
1	(Belarus) M Mirnyi (Canada) D Nestor	6^{5}	5
(Spain) M Granollers (Spain) M López	7^{7}	7
(Finland) J Nieminen (Serbia) V Troicki	6	5	[8]
WC	(Netherlands) T Schoorel (Netherlands) I Sijsling	1	7	[10]
3	(Sweden) R Lindstedt (Romania) H Tecău	6	7
(Austria) O Marach (Austria) A Peya	1	5
(Czech Republic) F Čermák (Slovakia) F Polášek	5	3
(Argentina) JM del Potro (Germany) P Petzschner	7	6
WC	(Netherlands) T de Bakker (Netherlands) R Haase	7^{7}	7
(Poland) M Fyrstenberg (Poland) M Matkowski	6^{2}	5
(Russia) A Bogomolov Jr. (Belgium) D Norman	6	3	[10]
4	(India) M Bhupathi (India) R Bopanna	4	6	[6]
(France) R Gasquet (Croatia) I Ljubičić	6^{4}	1
(Pakistan) A-u-H Qureshi (Netherlands) J-J Rojer	7^{7}	6
(Czech Republic) T Berdych (Poland) Ł Kubot	3	6	[7]
2	(France) M Llodra (Serbia) N Zimonjić	6	3	[10]

Quarterfinals
(Spain) M Granollers (Spain) M López	6	6
WC	(Netherlands) T Schoorel (Netherlands) I Sijsling	1	1
3	(Sweden) R Lindstedt (Romania) H Tecău	6	1	[10]
(Argentina) JM del Potro (Germany) P Petzschner	4	6	[8]
WC	(Netherlands) T de Bakker (Netherlands) R Haase	7^{7}	1	[7]
(Russia) A Bogomolov Jr. (Belgium) D Norman	6^{2}	6	[10]
(Pakistan) A-u-H Qureshi (Netherlands) J-J Rojer	6^{2}	4
2	(France) M Llodra (Serbia) N Zimonjić	7^{7}	6

Semifinals
(Spain) M Granollers (Spain) M López	4	3
3	(Sweden) R Lindstedt (Romania) H Tecău	6	6
(Russia) A Bogomolov Jr. (Belgium) D Norman	5	4
2	(France) M Llodra (Serbia) N Zimonjić	7	6

Final
3	(Sweden) R Lindstedt (Romania) H Tecău	6	5	[14]
2	(France) M Llodra (Serbia) N Zimonjić	4	7	[16]
