= 2012 ABN AMRO World Tennis Tournament =

- Date: 13–19 February
- Edition: 40th
- Category: ATP World Tour 500
- Draw: 32S/16D
- Prize money: €1,207,500
- Surface: Hardcourt / Indoor
- Location: Rotterdam, Netherlands
- Venue: Rotterdam Ahoy

Champions

Singles
- (Switzerland) Roger Federer

Doubles
- (France) Michaël Llodra / (Serbia) Nenad Zimonjić

Wheelchair singles
- (Netherlands) Ronald Vink
- ABN AMRO World Tennis Tournament

The 2012 ABN AMRO World Tennis Tournament was a men's tennis tournament played on indoor hard courts. It was the 40th edition of the event known as the ABN AMRO World Tennis Tournament, and was part of the ATP World Tour 500 series of the 2012 ATP World Tour. It took place at the Rotterdam Ahoy indoor sporting arena in Rotterdam, Netherlands, from 13 February through 19 February 2012. First-seeded Roger Federer won the singles title.

The field was led by 16-time Grand Slam champion Roger Federer, 2010 Wimbledon finalist Tomáš Berdych and 2009 US Open champion Juan Martín del Potro.

== Finals ==
=== Singles ===
(Switzerland) Roger Federer defeated (Argentina) Juan Martín del Potro 6–1, 6–4

- It was Federer's 1st title of the year and 71st of his career. It was his 2nd win at Rotterdam, also winning in 2005.

=== Doubles ===
(France) Michaël Llodra / (Serbia) Nenad Zimonjić defeated (Sweden) Robert Lindstedt / (Romania) Horia Tecău 4–6, 7–5, [16–14]

== Singles main draw entrants ==
=== Seeds ===
Country	Player	Rank^{1}	Seed
SUI	Roger Federer	3	1
CZE	Tomáš Berdych	7	2
ARG	Juan Martín del Potro	10	3
ESP	Feliciano López	15	4
FRA	Richard Gasquet	16	5
UKR	Alexandr Dolgopolov	18	6
SRB	Viktor Troicki	22	7
ESP	Marcel Granollers	27	8

- ^{1} Rankings as of February 6, 2012

=== Other entrants ===
The following players received wildcards into the main draw:

- (Netherlands) Thiemo de Bakker
- (Netherlands) Jesse Huta Galung
- (Netherlands) Igor Sijsling

The following players received entry from the qualifying draw:

- (Germany) Matthias Bachinger
- (Slovakia) Karol Beck
- (South Africa) Rik de Voest
- (France) Paul-Henri Mathieu

=== Withdrawals ===
- (Sweden) Robin Söderling (mononucleosis)

=== Retirements ===
- (Cyprus) Marcos Baghdatis (left calf injury)
- (Ukraine) Sergiy Stakhovsky (viral illness)
- (Russia) Mikhail Youzhny (foot injury)

== ATP doubles main draw entrants ==
=== Seeds ===
Country	Player	Country	Player	Rank^{1}	Seed
BLR	Max Mirnyi	CAN	Daniel Nestor	6	1
FRA	Michaël Llodra	SRB	Nenad Zimonjić	11	2
SWE	Robert Lindstedt	ROU	Horia Tecău	18	3
IND	Mahesh Bhupathi	IND	Rohan Bopanna	27	4

- Rankings are as of February 6, 2012

=== Other entrants ===
The following pairs received wildcards into the doubles main draw:

- (Netherlands) Thiemo de Bakker / (Netherlands) Robin Haase
- (Netherlands) Thomas Schoorel / (Netherlands) Igor Sijsling
