= 2012 Davis Cup World Group play-offs =

International men's tennis event

The 2012 Davis Cup World Group play-offs were held from September 14 to 16. They were the main play-offs of the 2012 Davis Cup. Winners of the playoffs advanced to the 2013 World Group, and losers were relegated to their respective Zonal Regions I.

== Teams ==
Bold indicates team has qualified for the 2013 Davis Cup World Group.

From World Group

- **Kazakhstan**
- **Germany**
- Japan
- Sweden
- **Canada**
- Russia
- **Italy**
- **Switzerland**

From Americas Group I

- **Brazil**
- Chile

From Asia/Oceania Group I

- Australia
- Uzbekistan

From Europe/Africa Group I

- **Belgium**
- **Israel**
- Netherlands
- South Africa

== Results ==
**Seeded teams**

1. Kazakhstan
2. Germany
3. Israel
4. Sweden
5. Canada
6. Russia
7. Italy
8. Switzerland

**Unseeded teams**

- Australia
- Belgium
- Brazil
- Chile
- Japan
- Netherlands
- South Africa
- Uzbekistan

| Home team | Score | Visiting team | Location | Venue | Door | Surface |
|---|---|---|---|---|---|---|
| **Kazakhstan** | 3–1 | Uzbekistan | Astana | National Tennis Centre | Indoor | Clay |
| **Germany** | 3–2 | Australia | Hamburg | Rothenbaum Stadium | Outdoor | Clay |
| Japan | 2–3 | **Israel** | Tokyo | Ariake Coliseum | Outdoor | Hard |
| **Belgium** | 5–0 | Sweden | Brussels | Royal Primerose Tennis Club | Outdoor | Clay |
| **Canada** | 4–1 | South Africa | Montreal | Uniprix Stadium | Outdoor | Hard |
| **Brazil** | 5–0 | Russia | São José do Rio Preto | Harmonia Tenis Clube | Outdoor | Clay |
| **Italy** | 4–1 | Chile | Naples | Tennis Club Napoli | Outdoor | Clay |
| Netherlands | 2–3 | **Switzerland** | Amsterdam | Westergasfabriek | Outdoor | Clay |

- Canada, Germany, Italy, Kazakhstan and Switzerland will remain in the World Group in 2013.
- Belgium, Brazil and Israel are promoted to the World Group in 2013.
- Australia, Chile, Netherlands, South Africa, and Uzbekistan will remain in Zonal Group I in 2013.
- Japan, Russia and Sweden are relegated to Zonal Group I in 2013.

== Playoff results ==
=== Kazakhstan vs. Uzbekistan ===
Kazakhstan
3
National Tennis Centre, Astana, Kazakhstan
14–16 September 2012
Clay (i)

Uzbekistan
1

| | | | 1 | 2 | 3 | 4 | 5 |
|---|---|---|---|---|---|---|---|---|
| 1 | (Kazakhstan) (Uzbekistan) | Evgeny Korolev; **Denis Istomin** | 3; **6** | **6**; 4 | 2; **6** | **6**; 0 | 3; **6** |
| 2 | (Kazakhstan) (Uzbekistan) | **Mikhail Kukushkin**; Farrukh Dustov | **6**; 2 | **6**; 4 | 3; **6** | **7^{7}** 6^{5} |
| 3 | (Kazakhstan) (Uzbekistan) | **Andrey Golubev / Yuri Schukin**; Farrukh Dustov / Denis Istomin | **7^{7}** 6^{3} | **6**; 3 | **6**; 4 |
| 4 | (Kazakhstan) (Uzbekistan) | **Mikhail Kukushkin**; Denis Istomin | **6**; 4 | **6**; 2 | 6^{4} **7^{7}** | **6**; 2 |
| 5 | (Kazakhstan) (Uzbekistan) | Evgeny Korolev; Farrukh Dustov | | | | | | **not** **played** |

=== Germany vs. Australia ===
Germany
3
Rothenbaum Stadium, Hamburg, Germany
14–16 September 2012
Clay

Australia
2

| | | | 1 | 2 | 3 | 4 | 5 |
|---|---|---|---|---|---|---|---|
| 1 | (Germany) (Australia) | Cedrik-Marcel Stebe; **Bernard Tomic** | **6**; 2 | 3; **6** | 4; **6** | 6^{4} **7^{7}** |
| 2 | (Germany) (Australia) | **Florian Mayer**; Lleyton Hewitt | **7**; 5 | **6**; 3 | **6**; 2 |
| 3 | (Germany) (Australia) | Benjamin Becker / Philipp Petzschner; **Chris Guccione / Lleyton Hewitt** | 3; **6** | 2; **6** | **6**; 2 | 6^{4} **7^{7}** |
| 4 | (Germany) (Australia) | **Florian Mayer**; Bernard Tomic | **6**; 4 | **6**; 2 | **6**; 3 |
| 5 | (Germany) (Australia) | **Cedrik-Marcel Stebe**; Lleyton Hewitt | **6**; 4 | **6**; 1 | **6**; 4 |

=== Japan vs. Israel ===
Japan
2
Ariake Coliseum, Tokyo, Japan
14–16 September 2012
Hard

Israel
3

| | | | 1 | 2 | 3 | 4 | 5 |
|---|---|---|---|---|---|---|---|
| 1 | (Japan) (Israel) | **Go Soeda**; Dudi Sela | **6**; 2 | **6**; 4 | 3; **6** | **6**; 4 |
| 2 | (Japan) (Israel) | Tatsuma Ito; **Amir Weintraub** | 3; **6** | 2; **6** | 4; **6** |
| 3 | (Japan) (Israel) | Tatsuma Ito / Yuichi Sugita; **Jonathan Erlich / Andy Ram** | **7**; 5 | 3; **6** | 3; **6** | 1; **6** |
| 4 | (Japan) (Israel) | **Kei Nishikori**; Dudi Sela | **6**; 3 | 3; **6** | 4; **6** | **6**; 4 | **7**; 5 |
| 5 | (Japan) (Israel) | Go Soeda; **Amir Weintraub** | 3; **6** | 6^{5} **7^{7}** | **6**; 4 | 3; **6** |

=== Belgium vs. Sweden ===
Belgium
5
Royal Primerose Tennis Club, Brussels, Belgium
14–16 September 2012
Clay

Sweden
0

| | | | 1 | 2 | 3 | 4 | 5 |
|---|---|---|---|---|---|---|---|
| 1 | (Belgium) (Sweden) | **Steve Darcis**; Michael Ryderstedt | **6**; 3 | **7^{7}** 6^{3} | **6**; 0 |
| 2 | (Belgium) (Sweden) | **David Goffin**; Andreas Vinciguerra | **6**; 4 | **6**; 3 | **7**; 5 |
| 3 | (Belgium) (Sweden) | **Ruben Bemelmans / Olivier Rochus**; Johan Brunström / Michael Ryderstedt | **6**; 4 | 4; **6** | **6**; 3 | **6**; 2 |
| 4 | (Belgium) (Sweden) | **David Goffin**; Markus Eriksson | **6**; 3 | **6**; 4 |
| 5 | (Belgium) (Sweden) | **Steve Darcis**; Andreas Vinciguerra | **6**; 4 | **6**; 2 |

=== Canada vs South Africa ===
Canada
4
Uniprix Stadium, Montreal, Canada
14–16 September 2012
Hard

South Africa
1

| | | | 1 | 2 | 3 | 4 | 5 |
|---|---|---|---|---|---|---|---|
| 1 | (Canada) (South Africa) | **Vasek Pospisil**; Izak van der Merwe | **6**; 3 | **6**; 4 | **6**; 4 |
| 2 | (Canada) (South Africa) | **Milos Raonic**; Nikala Scholtz | **7**; 5 | **6**; 4 | **7**; 5 |
| 3 | (Canada) (South Africa) | Daniel Nestor / Vasek Pospisil; **Raven Klaasen / Izak van der Merwe** | 4; **6** | 6^{2} **7^{7}** | 6^{5} **7^{7}** |
| 4 | (Canada) (South Africa) | **Milos Raonic**; Izak van der Merwe | **6**; 2 | **6**; 2 | **6**; 4 |
| 5 | (Canada) (South Africa) | **Frank Dancevic**; Nikala Scholtz | **6**; 2 | **6**; 2 |

=== Brazil vs. Russia ===
Brazil
5
Harmonia Tenis Clube, São José do Rio Preto, Brazil
14–16 September 2012
Clay

Russia
0

| | | | 1 | 2 | 3 | 4 | 5 |
|---|---|---|---|---|---|---|---|---|
| 1 | (Brazil) (Russia) | **Rogério Dutra da Silva**; Igor Andreev | **6**; 2 | **6**; 1 | 0; 0 | | | **retired** |
| 2 | (Brazil) (Russia) | **Thomaz Bellucci**; Teymuraz Gabashvili | **6**; 3 | 4; **6** | **6**; 0 | **7^{7}** 6^{4} |
| 3 | (Brazil) (Russia) | **Marcelo Melo / Bruno Soares**; Alex Bogomolov, Jr. / Teymuraz Gabashvili | **7**; 5 | **6**; 2 | **7^{9}** 6^{7} |
| 4 | (Brazil) (Russia) | **Thomaz Bellucci**; Alex Bogomolov, Jr. | **7^{7}** 6^{4} | **6**; 3 |
| 5 | (Brazil) (Russia) | **Rogério Dutra da Silva**; Stanislav Vovk | **6**; 2 | **6**; 2 |

=== Italy vs. Chile ===
Italy
4
Tennis Club Napoli, Naples, Italy
14–16 September 2012
Clay

Chile
1

| | | | 1 | 2 | 3 | 4 | 5 |
|---|---|---|---|---|---|---|---|
| 1 | (Italy) (Chile) | **Andreas Seppi**; Guillermo Hormazábal | **7**; 5 | **6**; 1 | **6**; 2 |
| 2 | (Italy) (Chile) | **Fabio Fognini**; Paul Capdeville | 2; **6** | **6**; 2 | 6^{6} **7^{8}** | **6**; 1 | **6**; 2 |
| 3 | (Italy) (Chile) | Daniele Bracciali / Andreas Seppi; **Jorge Aguilar / Paul Capdeville** | 4; **6** | **6**; 4 | 4; **6** | 2; **6** |
| 4 | (Italy) (Chile) | **Andreas Seppi**; Paul Capdeville | **6**; 3 | **6**; 1 | **6**; 3 |
| 5 | (Italy) (Chile) | **Simone Bolelli**; Christian Garín | **6**; 4 | **6**; 3 |

=== Netherlands vs. Switzerland ===
Netherlands
2
Westergasfabriek, Amsterdam, Netherlands
14–16 September 2012
Clay

Switzerland
3

| | | | 1 | 2 | 3 | 4 | 5 |
|---|---|---|---|---|---|---|---|
| 1 | (Netherlands) (Switzerland) | Thiemo de Bakker; **Roger Federer** | 3; **6** | 4; **6** | 4; **6** |
| 2 | (Netherlands) (Switzerland) | Robin Haase; **Stanislas Wawrinka** | 3; **6** | **6**; 3 | 3; **6** | 6^{4} **7^{7}** |
| 3 | (Netherlands) (Switzerland) | **Robin Haase / Jean-Julien Rojer**; Roger Federer / Stanislas Wawrinka | **6**; 4 | **6**; 2 | 5; **7** | **6**; 3 |
| 4 | (Netherlands) (Switzerland) | Robin Haase; **Roger Federer** | 1; **6** | 4; **6** | 4; **6** |
| 5 | (Netherlands) (Switzerland) | **Thiemo de Bakker**; Marco Chiudinelli | **6**; 2 | **7^{7}** 6^{4} |
