= 2013 Davis Cup World Group =

2013 edition of the Davis Cup World Group

- Date: 1 February – 17 November
- Edition: 33rd

Champions
- Czech Republic
- Davis Cup

The World Group was the highest level of Davis Cup competition in 2013. The first-round losers go into the Davis Cup World Group play-offs, and the winners progress to the quarterfinals. The quarterfinalists were guaranteed a World Group spot for 2014. Czech Republic defended their Davis Cup title by defeating the Serbian team in Belgrade in the final.

== Participating teams ==
Participating teams
Argentina	Austria	Belgium	Brazil
Canada	Croatia	Czech Republic	France
Germany	Italy	Israel	Kazakhstan
Serbia	Spain	Switzerland	United States

== Seeds ==
1. Spain (first round)
2. Czech Republic (champions)
3. Argentina (semifinals)
4. Serbia (final)
5. France (quarterfinals)
6. United States (quarterfinals)
7. Croatia (first round)
8. Kazakhstan (quarterfinals)

== Draw ==
First round 1–3 February
Vancouver, Canada (indoor hard)
1	Spain	2
Canada	3
Turin, Italy (indoor clay)
7	Croatia	2
Italy	3
Charleroi, Belgium (indoor clay)
4	Serbia	3
Belgium	2
Jacksonville, United States (indoor hard)
6	United States	3
Brazil	2
Rouen, France (indoor hard)
Israel	0
5	France	5
Buenos Aires, Argentina (clay)
Germany	0
3	Argentina	5
Astana, Kazakhstan (indoor clay)
Austria	1
8	Kazakhstan	3
Geneva, Switzerland (indoor hard)
Switzerland	2
2	Czech Republic	3

Quarterfinals; 5–7 April
Vancouver, Canada (indoor hard)
Canada	3
Italy	1
Boise, United States (indoor hard)
4	Serbia	3
6	United States	1
Buenos Aires, Argentina (clay)
5	France	2
3	Argentina	3
Astana, Kazakhstan (indoor clay)
8	Kazakhstan	1
2	Czech Republic	3

Semifinals; 13–15 September
Belgrade, Serbia (indoor clay)
Canada	2
4	Serbia	3
Prague, Czech Republic (indoor hard)
3	Argentina	2
2	Czech Republic	3

Final; 15–17 November
Belgrade, Serbia (indoor hard)
4	Serbia	2
2	Czech Republic	3

== First round ==
=== Canada vs. Spain ===
Canada
3
Thunderbird Sports Centre, Vancouver, Canada
1–3 February 2013
Hard (i)

Spain
2

			1	2	3	4	5
1	(Canada) (Spain)	Milos Raonic; Albert Ramos	6^{5} 7^{7}	6; 4	6; 4	6; 4
2	(Canada) (Spain)	Frank Dancevic; Marcel Granollers	6; 1	6; 2	6; 2
3	(Canada) (Spain)	Daniel Nestor / Vasek Pospisil; Marcel Granollers / Marc López	6; 4	4; 6	7^{7} 6^{4}	3; 6	2; 6
4	(Canada) (Spain)	Milos Raonic; Guillermo García-López	6; 3	6; 4	6; 2
5	(Canada) (Spain)	Frank Dancevic; Albert Ramos	5; 7	4; 6

=== Italy vs. Croatia ===
Italy
3
Palavela, Turin, Italy
1–3 February 2013
Clay (i)

Croatia
2

			1	2	3	4	5
1	(Italy) (Croatia)	Paolo Lorenzi; Marin Čilić	1; 6	7^{8} 6^{6}	6; 4	3; 6	2; 6
2	(Italy) (Croatia)	Andreas Seppi; Ivan Dodig	6; 2	6^{2} 7^{7}	6; 4	6; 4
3	(Italy) (Croatia)	Simone Bolelli / Fabio Fognini; Marin Čilić / Ivan Dodig	3; 6	6; 1	6; 3	7^{13} 6^{11}
4	(Italy) (Croatia)	Andreas Seppi; Marin Čilić	3; 6	3; 6	5; 7
5	(Italy) (Croatia)	Fabio Fognini; Ivan Dodig	4; 6	6; 4	6; 4	6; 4

=== Belgium vs. Serbia ===
Belgium
2
Spiroudome de Charleroi, Charleroi, Belgium
1–3 February 2013
Clay (i)

Serbia
3

			1	2	3	4	5
1	(Belgium) (Serbia)	David Goffin; Viktor Troicki	6; 1	6; 3	6^{5} 7^{7}	4; 6	4; 6
2	(Belgium) (Serbia)	Olivier Rochus; Novak Djokovic	3; 6	2; 6	2; 6
3	(Belgium) (Serbia)	Steve Darcis / Ruben Bemelmans; Viktor Troicki / Nenad Zimonjić	4; 6	4; 6	7; 5	4; 6
4	(Belgium) (Serbia)	David Goffin; Boris Pašanski	6; 4	2; 6	6; 2
5	(Belgium) (Serbia)	Steve Darcis; Nenad Zimonjić	6; 2	6; 4

=== United States vs. Brazil ===
United States
3
Jacksonville Veterans Memorial Arena, Jacksonville, United States
1–3 February 2013
Hard (i)

Brazil
2

			1	2	3	4	5
1	(United States) (Brazil)	Sam Querrey; Thomaz Bellucci	6; 3	6; 4	6; 4
2	(United States) (Brazil)	John Isner; Thiago Alves	6; 3	7^{7} 6^{4}	6; 3
3	(United States) (Brazil)	Bob Bryan / Mike Bryan; Marcelo Melo / Bruno Soares	6^{6} 7^{8}	7^{9} 6^{7}	4; 6	6; 3	3; 6
4	(United States) (Brazil)	John Isner; Thomaz Bellucci	6; 2	4; 6	7^{9} 6^{7}	4; 6	3; 6
5	(United States) (Brazil)	Sam Querrey; Thiago Alves	4; 6	6; 3	6; 4	7^{7} 6^{3}

=== France vs. Israel ===
France
5
Kindarena, Rouen, France
1–3 February 2013
Hard (i)

Israel
0

			1	2	3	4	5
1	(France) (Israel)	Jo-Wilfried Tsonga; Amir Weintraub	6; 3	6; 3	4; 6	7; 5
2	(France) (Israel)	Richard Gasquet; Dudi Sela	6; 3	6; 2	6; 2
3	(France) (Israel)	Julien Benneteau / Michaël Llodra; Jonathan Erlich / Dudi Sela	7^{7} 6^{3}	6; 1	6; 0
4	(France) (Israel)	Michaël Llodra; Noam Okun	6; 3	7^{7} 6^{5}
5	(France) (Israel)	Richard Gasquet; Amir Weintraub	6; 4	6; 3

=== Argentina vs. Germany ===
Argentina
5
Parque Roca, Buenos Aires, Argentina
1–3 February 2013
Clay

Germany
0

			1	2	3	4	5
1	(Argentina) (Germany)	Carlos Berlocq; Philipp Kohlschreiber	3; 6	7; 5	2; 6	6; 4	4; 5	retired
2	(Argentina) (Germany)	Juan Mónaco; Florian Mayer	6^{4} 7^{7}	6; 3	6; 3	6; 4
3	(Argentina) (Germany)	David Nalbandian / Horacio Zeballos; Tobias Kamke / Christopher Kas	6; 1	6; 4	5; 7	6; 2
4	(Argentina) (Germany)	Juan Mónaco; Tobias Kamke	6; 4	7^{7} 6^{2}
5	(Argentina) (Germany)	Carlos Berlocq; Christopher Kas	6; 2	6; 4

=== Kazakhstan vs. Austria ===
Kazakhstan
3
National Tennis Centre, Astana, Kazakhstan
1–3 February 2013
Clay (i)

Austria
1

			1	2	3	4	5
1	(Kazakhstan) (Austria)	Andrey Golubev; Andreas Haider-Maurer	7^{7} 6^{2}	6; 3	7^{7} 6^{5}
2	(Kazakhstan) (Austria)	Evgeny Korolev; Jürgen Melzer	7^{7} 6^{4}	6; 3	6; 2
3	(Kazakhstan) (Austria)	Yuri Schukin / Andrey Golubev; Alexander Peya / Julian Knowle	6^{5} 7^{7}	3; 6	6^{4} 7^{7}
4	(Kazakhstan) (Austria)	Andrey Golubev; Jürgen Melzer	4; 6	6; 3	6; 4	6; 2
5	(Kazakhstan) (Austria)	Evgeny Korolev; Andreas Haider-Maurer						not played

=== Switzerland vs. Czech Republic ===
Switzerland
2
Palexpo, Geneva, Switzerland
1–3 February 2013
Hard (i)

Czech Republic
3

			1	2	3	4	5
1	(Switzerland) (Czech Republic)	Stanislas Wawrinka; Lukáš Rosol	6; 4	6; 3	6; 4
2	(Switzerland) (Czech Republic)	Henri Laaksonen; Tomáš Berdych	3; 6	2; 6	7^{7} 6^{5}	1; 6
3	(Switzerland) (Czech Republic)	Marco Chiudinelli / Stanislas Wawrinka; Tomáš Berdych / Lukáš Rosol	4; 6	7; 5	4; 6	7^{7} 6^{3}	22; 24
4	(Switzerland) (Czech Republic)	Stanislas Wawrinka; Tomáš Berdych	3; 6	4; 6	6; 3	6^{5} 7^{7}
5	(Switzerland) (Czech Republic)	Henri Laaksonen; Jiří Veselý	0; 6	6; 3	6; 1

The doubles match was the second longest match of all time (7 hours and 1 minute).

== Quarterfinals ==
=== Canada vs. Italy ===
Canada
3
Doug Mitchell Thunderbird Sports Centre, Vancouver, Canada
5–7 April 2013
Hard (i)

Italy
1

			1	2	3	4	5
1	(Canada) (Italy)	Vasek Pospisil; Andreas Seppi	7; 5	6; 4	4; 6	3; 6	3; 6
2	(Canada) (Italy)	Milos Raonic; Fabio Fognini	6; 4	7^{7} 6^{4}	7; 5
3	(Canada) (Italy)	Daniel Nestor / Vasek Pospisil; Daniele Bracciali / Fabio Fognini	6; 3	6; 4	3; 6	3; 6	15; 13
4	(Canada) (Italy)	Milos Raonic; Andreas Seppi	6; 4	6; 4	3; 6	7; 5
5	(Canada) (Italy)	Vasek Pospisil; Fabio Fognini						not played

=== United States vs. Serbia ===
United States
1
Taco Bell Arena, Boise, United States
5–7 April 2013
Hard (i)

Serbia
3

			1	2	3	4	5
1	(United States) (Serbia)	John Isner; Novak Djokovic	6^{5} 7^{7}	2; 6	5; 7
2	(United States) (Serbia)	Sam Querrey; Viktor Troicki	7^{7} 6^{1}	3; 6	4; 6	6; 1	6; 4
3	(United States) (Serbia)	Bob Bryan / Mike Bryan; Ilija Bozoljac / Nenad Zimonjić	6^{5} 7^{7}	6^{1} 7^{7}	7; 5	6; 4	13; 15
4	(United States) (Serbia)	Sam Querrey; Novak Djokovic	5; 7	7^{7} 6^{4}	1; 6	0; 6
5	(United States) (Serbia)	John Isner; Viktor Troicki						not played

=== Argentina vs. France ===
Argentina
3
Parque Roca, Buenos Aires, Argentina
5–7 April 2013
Clay

France
2

			1	2	3	4	5
1	(Argentina) (France)	Carlos Berlocq; Jo-Wilfried Tsonga	6; 4	2; 6	3; 6	7; 5	2; 6
2	(Argentina) (France)	Juan Mónaco; Gilles Simon	7^{7} 6^{2}	6; 2	6; 4
3	(Argentina) (France)	David Nalbandian / Horacio Zeballos; Michaël Llodra / Julien Benneteau	3; 6	7^{7} 6^{3}	7; 5	6; 3
4	(Argentina) (France)	Juan Mónaco; Jo-Wilfried Tsonga	3; 6	3; 6	0; 6
5	(Argentina) (France)	Carlos Berlocq; Gilles Simon	6; 4	5; 7	6; 4	6; 4

=== Kazakhstan vs. Czech Republic ===
Kazakhstan
1
National Tennis Centre, Astana, Kazakhstan
5–7 April 2013
Clay (i)

Czech Republic
3

			1	2	3	4	5
1	(Kazakhstan) (Czech Republic)	Mikhail Kukushkin; Jan Hájek	3; 6	2; 6	4; 6
2	(Kazakhstan) (Czech Republic)	Andrey Golubev; Lukáš Rosol	6; 4	4; 6	2; 6	6^{6} 7^{8}
3	(Kazakhstan) (Czech Republic)	Andrey Golubev / Yuri Schukin; Jan Hájek / Radek Štěpánek	7^{7} 6^{2}	6; 4	6; 3
4	(Kazakhstan) (Czech Republic)	Evgeny Korolev; Lukáš Rosol	6^{5} 7^{7}	7^{7} 6^{2}	6^{5} 7^{7}	2; 6
5	(Kazakhstan) (Czech Republic)	Andrey Golubev; Jan Hájek

== Semifinals ==
=== Serbia vs. Canada ===
Serbia
3
Belgrade Arena, Belgrade, Serbia
13–15 September 2013
Clay (i)

Canada
2

			1	2	3	4	5
1	(Serbia) (Canada)	Novak Djokovic; Vasek Pospisil	6; 2	6; 0	6; 4
2	(Serbia) (Canada)	Janko Tipsarević; Milos Raonic	7; 5	3; 6	6; 3	3; 6	8; 10
3	(Serbia) (Canada)	Ilija Bozoljac / Nenad Zimonjić; Daniel Nestor / Vasek Pospisil	7^{8} 6^{6}	4; 6	6; 3	6^{5} 7^{7}	8; 10
4	(Serbia) (Canada)	Novak Djokovic; Milos Raonic	7^{7} 6^{1}	6; 2	6; 2
5	(Serbia) (Canada)	Janko Tipsarević; Vasek Pospisil	7^{7} 6^{3}	6; 2	7^{8} 6^{6}

=== Czech Republic vs. Argentina ===
Czech Republic
3
O2 Arena, Prague, Czech Republic
13–15 September 2013
Hard (i)

Argentina
2

			1	2	3	4	5
1	(Czech Republic) (Argentina)	Radek Štěpánek; Juan Mónaco	7^{7} 6^{3}	6; 3	6; 2
2	(Czech Republic) (Argentina)	Tomáš Berdych; Leonardo Mayer	6; 4	4; 6	6; 3	6; 4
3	(Czech Republic) (Argentina)	Tomáš Berdych / Radek Štěpánek; Carlos Berlocq / Horacio Zeballos	6; 3	6; 4	6; 2
4	(Czech Republic) (Argentina)	Lukáš Rosol; Horacio Zeballos	6; 4	6^{6} 7^{8}	4; 6
5	(Czech Republic) (Argentina)	Jiří Veselý; Leonardo Mayer	4; 6	4; 6

== Final ==
=== Serbia vs. Czech Republic ===
Serbia
2
Belgrade Arena, Belgrade, Serbia
15–17 November 2013
Hard (i)

Czech Republic
3

			1	2	3	4	5
1	(Serbia) (Czech Republic)	Novak Djokovic; Radek Štěpánek	7; 5	6; 1	6; 4
2	(Serbia) (Czech Republic)	Dušan Lajović; Tomáš Berdych	3; 6	4; 6	3; 6
3	(Serbia) (Czech Republic)	Ilija Bozoljac / Nenad Zimonjić; Tomáš Berdych / Radek Štěpánek	2; 6	4; 6	6^{4} 7^{7}
4	(Serbia) (Czech Republic)	Novak Djokovic; Tomáš Berdych	6; 4	7^{7} 6^{5}	6; 2
5	(Serbia) (Czech Republic)	Dušan Lajović; Radek Štěpánek	3; 6	1; 6	1; 6
