= 2012 ATP World Tour =

Men's tennis circuit

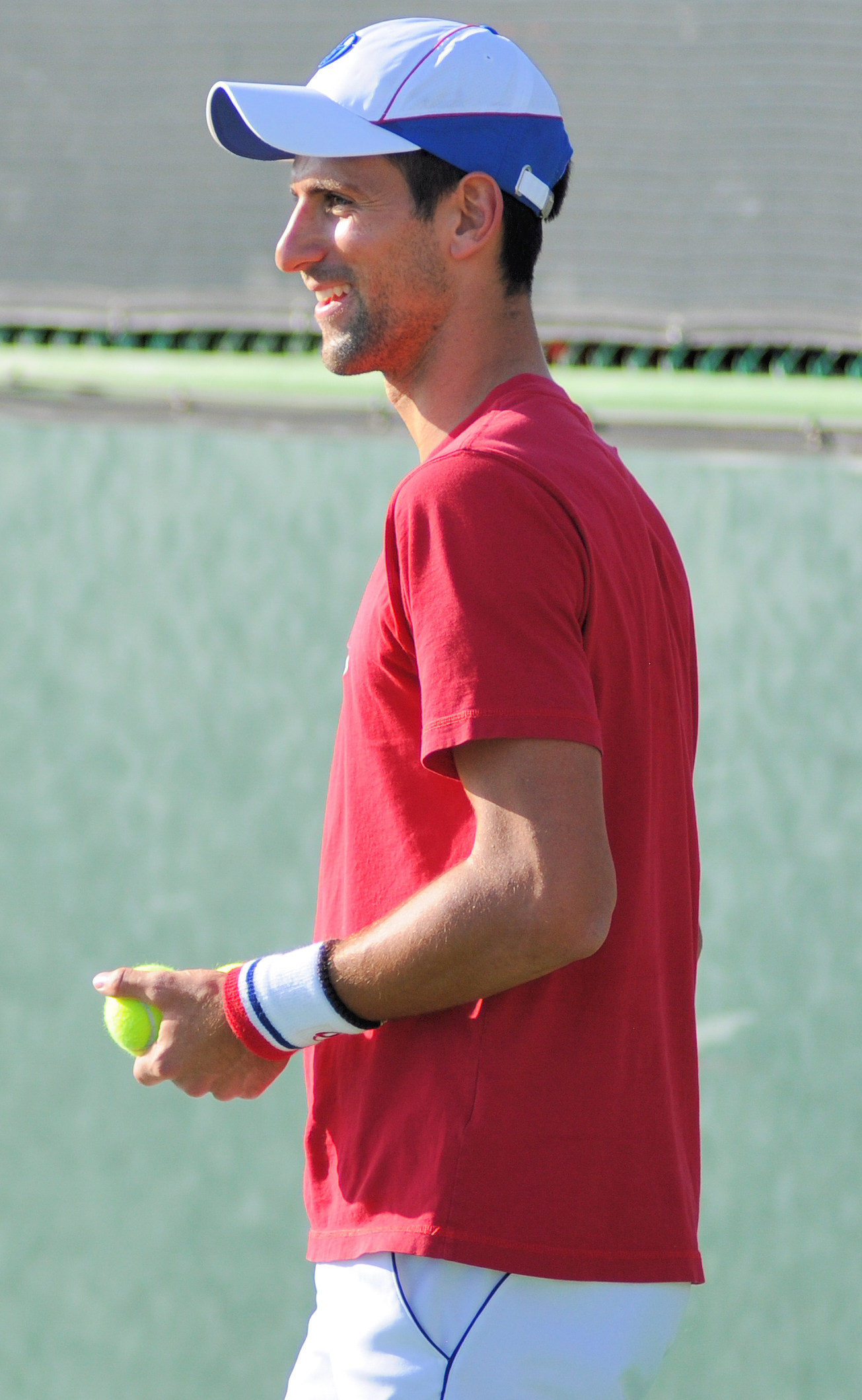
- Novak Djokovic finished the year as world No. 1 for the second time in his career. He won six tournaments during the season, including a major at the Australian Open, as well as the ATP World Tour Finals. He also won three Masters 1000 events and finished runner-up at two other majors, at the French Open and the US Open.

Details
- Duration: 31 December 2011 – 18 November 2012
- Edition: 43rd
- Tournaments: 69

Achievements (singles)
- Most titles: (Spain) David Ferrer (7)
- Most finals: (Serbia) Novak Djokovic (11)
- Prize money leader: (Serbia) Novak Djokovic ($12,803,737)
- Points leader: (Serbia) Novak Djokovic (12,920)

Awards
- Player of the year: (Serbia) Novak Djokovic
- Doubles team of the year: (United States) Bob Bryan (United States) Mike Bryan
- Most improved player of the year: (Australia) Marinko Matosevic
- Newcomer of the year: (Slovakia) Martin Kližan
- Comeback player of the year: (Germany) Tommy Haas

The 2012 ATP World Tour was the global elite professional tennis circuit organized by the Association of Tennis Professionals (ATP) for the 2012 tennis season. The 2012 ATP World Tour calendar comprises the Grand Slam tournaments (supervised by the International Tennis Federation (ITF)), the ATP World Tour Masters 1000, the ATP World Tour 500 series, the ATP World Tour 250 series, the ATP World Team Championship, the Davis Cup (organized by the ITF), the ATP World Tour Finals, and the tennis event at the London Summer Olympic Games. Also included in the 2012 calendar is the Hopman Cup, which is organized by the ITF and does not distribute ranking points.

== Schedule ==
This is the complete schedule of events on the 2012 calendar, with player progression documented from the quarterfinals stage.

Key

Grand Slam
ATP World Tour Finals
Olympic Games
ATP World Tour Masters 1000
ATP World Tour 500
ATP World Tour 250
Team Events

=== January ===
Week	Tournament	Champions	Runners-up	Semifinalists	Quarterfinalists
2 Jan	Hyundai Hopman Cup; Perth, Australia; ITF Mixed Team Championships; Hard (i) – A$1,000,000 – 8 teams (RR)	Czech Republic; 2–0	France	Round Robin (Group A) Bulgaria; Denmark; United States	Round Robin (Group B) Spain; Australia; China
2 Jan	Brisbane International; Brisbane, Australia; ATP World Tour 250; Hard – $434,250 – 32S/16D; Singles – Doubles	(United Kingdom) Andy Murray; 6–1, 6–3	(Ukraine) Alexandr Dolgopolov	(Australia) Bernard Tomic (France) Gilles Simon	(Cyprus) Marcos Baghdatis (Uzbekistan) Denis Istomin (Czech Republic) Radek Štěpánek (Colombia) Santiago Giraldo
2 Jan	Brisbane International; Brisbane, Australia; ATP World Tour 250; Hard – $434,250 – 32S/16D; Singles – Doubles	(Belarus) Max Mirnyi (Canada) Daniel Nestor; 6–1, 6–2	(Austria) Jürgen Melzer (Germany) Philipp Petzschner	(Australia) Bernard Tomic (France) Gilles Simon	(Cyprus) Marcos Baghdatis (Uzbekistan) Denis Istomin (Czech Republic) Radek Štěpánek (Colombia) Santiago Giraldo
2 Jan	Aircel Chennai Open; Chennai, India; ATP World Tour 250; Hard – $398,250 – 28S/16D; Singles – Doubles	(Canada) Milos Raonic; 6–7^{(4–7)}, 7–6^{(7–4)}, 7–6^{(7–4)}	(Serbia) Janko Tipsarević	(Japan) Go Soeda (Spain) Nicolás Almagro	(Belgium) David Goffin (Switzerland) Stanislas Wawrinka (Israel) Dudi Sela (Japan) Yūichi Sugita
2 Jan	Aircel Chennai Open; Chennai, India; ATP World Tour 250; Hard – $398,250 – 28S/16D; Singles – Doubles	(India) Leander Paes (Serbia) Janko Tipsarević; 6–4, 6–4	(Israel) Jonathan Erlich (Israel) Andy Ram	(Japan) Go Soeda (Spain) Nicolás Almagro	(Belgium) David Goffin (Switzerland) Stanislas Wawrinka (Israel) Dudi Sela (Japan) Yūichi Sugita
2 Jan	Qatar ExxonMobil Open; Doha, Qatar; ATP World Tour 250; Hard – $1,024,000 – 32S/16D; Singles – Doubles	(France) Jo-Wilfried Tsonga; 7–5, 6–3	(France) Gaël Monfils	(Spain) Rafael Nadal (Switzerland) Roger Federer	(Russia) Mikhail Youzhny (Serbia) Viktor Troicki (Spain) Albert Ramos (Italy) Andreas Seppi
2 Jan	Qatar ExxonMobil Open; Doha, Qatar; ATP World Tour 250; Hard – $1,024,000 – 32S/16D; Singles – Doubles	(Slovakia) Filip Polášek (Czech Republic) Lukáš Rosol; 6–3, 6–4	(Germany) Christopher Kas (Germany) Philipp Kohlschreiber	(Spain) Rafael Nadal (Switzerland) Roger Federer	(Russia) Mikhail Youzhny (Serbia) Viktor Troicki (Spain) Albert Ramos (Italy) Andreas Seppi
9 Jan	Apia International Sydney; Sydney, Australia; ATP World Tour 250; Hard – $434,250 – 28S/16D; Singles – Doubles	(Finland) Jarkko Nieminen; 6–2, 7–5	(France) Julien Benneteau	(Cyprus) Marcos Baghdatis (Uzbekistan) Denis Istomin	(Argentina) Juan Martín del Potro (Russia) Alex Bogomolov Jr. (France) Richard Gasquet (United States) Bobby Reynolds
9 Jan	Apia International Sydney; Sydney, Australia; ATP World Tour 250; Hard – $434,250 – 28S/16D; Singles – Doubles	(United States) Bob Bryan (United States) Mike Bryan; 6–1, 6–4	(Australia) Matthew Ebden (Finland) Jarkko Nieminen	(Cyprus) Marcos Baghdatis (Uzbekistan) Denis Istomin	(Argentina) Juan Martín del Potro (Russia) Alex Bogomolov Jr. (France) Richard Gasquet (United States) Bobby Reynolds
9 Jan	Heineken Open; Auckland, New Zealand; ATP World Tour 250; Hard – $398,250 – 28S/16D; Singles – Doubles	(Spain) David Ferrer; 6–3, 6–4	(Belgium) Olivier Rochus	(Spain) Fernando Verdasco (Germany) Philipp Kohlschreiber	(Colombia) Alejandro Falla (Spain) Guillermo García López (France) Benoît Paire (Spain) Nicolás Almagro
9 Jan	Heineken Open; Auckland, New Zealand; ATP World Tour 250; Hard – $398,250 – 28S/16D; Singles – Doubles	(Austria) Oliver Marach (Austria) Alexander Peya; 6–3, 6–2	(Czech Republic) František Čermák (Slovakia) Filip Polášek	(Spain) Fernando Verdasco (Germany) Philipp Kohlschreiber	(Colombia) Alejandro Falla (Spain) Guillermo García López (France) Benoît Paire (Spain) Nicolás Almagro
16 Jan; 23 Jan	Australian Open; Melbourne, Australia; Grand Slam; Hard – A$11,806,550; 128S/128Q/64D/32X; Singles – Doubles – Mixed doubles	(Serbia) Novak Djokovic; 5–7, 6–4, 6–2, 6–7^{(5–7)}, 7–5	(Spain) Rafael Nadal	(United Kingdom) Andy Murray (Switzerland) Roger Federer	(Spain) David Ferrer (Japan) Kei Nishikori (Argentina) Juan Martín del Potro (Czech Republic) Tomáš Berdych
16 Jan; 23 Jan	Australian Open; Melbourne, Australia; Grand Slam; Hard – A$11,806,550; 128S/128Q/64D/32X; Singles – Doubles – Mixed doubles	(India) Leander Paes (Czech Republic) Radek Štěpánek; 7–6^{(7–1)}, 6–2	(United States) Bob Bryan (United States) Mike Bryan	(United Kingdom) Andy Murray (Switzerland) Roger Federer	(Spain) David Ferrer (Japan) Kei Nishikori (Argentina) Juan Martín del Potro (Czech Republic) Tomáš Berdych
16 Jan; 23 Jan	Australian Open; Melbourne, Australia; Grand Slam; Hard – A$11,806,550; 128S/128Q/64D/32X; Singles – Doubles – Mixed doubles	(United States) Bethanie Mattek-Sands (Romania) Horia Tecău; 6–3, 5–7, [10–3]	(Russia) Elena Vesnina (India) Leander Paes	(United Kingdom) Andy Murray (Switzerland) Roger Federer	(Spain) David Ferrer (Japan) Kei Nishikori (Argentina) Juan Martín del Potro (Czech Republic) Tomáš Berdych
30 Jan	Open Sud de France; Montpellier, France; ATP World Tour 250; Hard (i) – €398,250 – 28S/16D; Singles – Doubles	(Czech Republic) Tomáš Berdych; 6–2, 4–6, 6–3	(France) Gaël Monfils	(Germany) Philipp Kohlschreiber (France) Gilles Simon	(France) Nicolas Mahut (France) Richard Gasquet (Finland) Jarkko Nieminen (France) Guillaume Rufin
30 Jan	Open Sud de France; Montpellier, France; ATP World Tour 250; Hard (i) – €398,250 – 28S/16D; Singles – Doubles	(France) Nicolas Mahut (France) Édouard Roger-Vasselin; 6–4, 7–6^{(7–4)}	(Australia) Paul Hanley (United Kingdom) Jamie Murray	(Germany) Philipp Kohlschreiber (France) Gilles Simon	(France) Nicolas Mahut (France) Richard Gasquet (Finland) Jarkko Nieminen (France) Guillaume Rufin
30 Jan	PBZ Zagreb Indoors; Zagreb, Croatia; ATP World Tour 250; Hard (i) – €398,250 – 32S/16D; Singles – Doubles	(Russia) Mikhail Youzhny; 6–2, 6–3	(Slovakia) Lukáš Lacko	(Germany) Michael Berrer (Cyprus) Marcos Baghdatis	(Austria) Jürgen Melzer (Croatia) Ivo Karlović (Croatia) Ivan Dodig (Netherlands) Robin Haase
30 Jan	PBZ Zagreb Indoors; Zagreb, Croatia; ATP World Tour 250; Hard (i) – €398,250 – 32S/16D; Singles – Doubles	(Cyprus) Marcos Baghdatis (Russia) Mikhail Youzhny; 6–2, 6–2	(Croatia) Ivan Dodig (Croatia) Mate Pavić	(Germany) Michael Berrer (Cyprus) Marcos Baghdatis	(Austria) Jürgen Melzer (Croatia) Ivo Karlović (Croatia) Ivan Dodig (Netherlands) Robin Haase
30 Jan	VTR Open; Viña del Mar, Chile; ATP World Tour 250; Clay – $398,250 – 28S/16D; Singles – Doubles	(Argentina) Juan Mónaco; 6–3, 6–7^{(1–7)}, 6–1	(Argentina) Carlos Berlocq	(France) Jérémy Chardy (Argentina) Juan Ignacio Chela	(Spain) Albert Montañés (Portugal) Frederico Gil (Argentina) Federico Delbonis (Brazil) João Souza
30 Jan	VTR Open; Viña del Mar, Chile; ATP World Tour 250; Clay – $398,250 – 28S/16D; Singles – Doubles	(Portugal) Frederico Gil (Spain) Daniel Gimeno Traver; 1–6, 7–5, [12–10]	(Spain) Pablo Andújar (Argentina) Carlos Berlocq	(France) Jérémy Chardy (Argentina) Juan Ignacio Chela	(Spain) Albert Montañés (Portugal) Frederico Gil (Argentina) Federico Delbonis (Brazil) João Souza

=== February ===
Week	Tournament	Champions	Runners-up	Semifinalists	Quarterfinalists
6 Feb	Davis Cup by BNP Paribas First Round; Oviedo, Spain – clay (i); Wiener Neustadt, Austria – hard (i); Vancouver, Canada – hard (i); Fribourg, Switzerland – clay (i); Ostrava, Czech Republic – hard (i); Niš, Serbia – hard (i); Kobe, Japan – hard (i); Bamberg, Germany – clay (i)	First round winners Spain 5–0; Austria 3–2; France 4–1; United States 5–0; Czech Republic 4–1; Serbia 4–1; Croatia 3–2; Argentina 4–1	First round losers Kazakhstan; Russia; Canada; Switzerland; Italy; Sweden; Japan; Germany		
13 Feb	ABN AMRO World Tennis Tournament; Rotterdam, Netherlands; ATP World Tour 500; Hard (i) – €1,207,500 – 32S/16D; Singles – Doubles	(Switzerland) Roger Federer; 6–1, 6–4	(Argentina) Juan Martín del Potro	(Russia) Nikolay Davydenko (Czech Republic) Tomáš Berdych	(Finland) Jarkko Nieminen (France) Richard Gasquet (Serbia) Viktor Troicki (Italy) Andreas Seppi
13 Feb	ABN AMRO World Tennis Tournament; Rotterdam, Netherlands; ATP World Tour 500; Hard (i) – €1,207,500 – 32S/16D; Singles – Doubles	(France) Michaël Llodra (Serbia) Nenad Zimonjić; 4–6, 7–5, [16–14]	(Sweden) Robert Lindstedt (Romania) Horia Tecău	(Russia) Nikolay Davydenko (Czech Republic) Tomáš Berdych	(Finland) Jarkko Nieminen (France) Richard Gasquet (Serbia) Viktor Troicki (Italy) Andreas Seppi
13 Feb	SAP Open; San Jose, United States; ATP World Tour 250; Hard (i) – $531,000 – 28S/16D; Singles – Doubles	(Canada) Milos Raonic; 7–6^{(7–3)}, 6–2	(Uzbekistan) Denis Istomin	(United States) Ryan Harrison (France) Julien Benneteau	(Bulgaria) Dimitar Kutrovsky (South Africa) Kevin Anderson (Belgium) Steve Darcis (United States) Andy Roddick
13 Feb	SAP Open; San Jose, United States; ATP World Tour 250; Hard (i) – $531,000 – 28S/16D; Singles – Doubles	(The Bahamas) Mark Knowles (Belgium) Xavier Malisse; 6–4, 1–6, [10–5]	(South Africa) Kevin Anderson (Germany) Frank Moser	(United States) Ryan Harrison (France) Julien Benneteau	(Bulgaria) Dimitar Kutrovsky (South Africa) Kevin Anderson (Belgium) Steve Darcis (United States) Andy Roddick
13 Feb	Brasil Open; São Paulo, Brazil; ATP World Tour 250; Clay (i) – $475,300 – 28S/16D; Singles – Doubles	(Spain) Nicolás Almagro; 6–3, 4–6, 6–4	(Italy) Filippo Volandri	(Spain) Albert Ramos (Brazil) Thomaz Bellucci	(Argentina) Carlos Berlocq (Spain) Fernando Verdasco (Argentina) Leonardo Mayer (Argentina) David Nalbandian
13 Feb	Brasil Open; São Paulo, Brazil; ATP World Tour 250; Clay (i) – $475,300 – 28S/16D; Singles – Doubles	(United States) Eric Butorac (Brazil) Bruno Soares; 3–6, 6–4, [10–8]	(Slovakia) Michal Mertiňák (Brazil) André Sá	(Spain) Albert Ramos (Brazil) Thomaz Bellucci	(Argentina) Carlos Berlocq (Spain) Fernando Verdasco (Argentina) Leonardo Mayer (Argentina) David Nalbandian
20 Feb	Regions Morgan Keegan Championships; Memphis, United States; ATP World Tour 500; Hard (i) – $1,155,000 – 32S/16D; Singles – Doubles	(Austria) Jürgen Melzer; 7–5, 7–6^{(7–4)}	(Canada) Milos Raonic	(Czech Republic) Radek Štěpánek (Germany) Benjamin Becker	(United States) John Isner (United States) Sam Querrey (Belgium) Olivier Rochus (Poland) Łukasz Kubot
20 Feb	Regions Morgan Keegan Championships; Memphis, United States; ATP World Tour 500; Hard (i) – $1,155,000 – 32S/16D; Singles – Doubles	(Belarus) Max Mirnyi (Canada) Daniel Nestor; 4–6, 7–5, [10–7]	(Croatia) Ivan Dodig (Brazil) Marcelo Melo	(Czech Republic) Radek Štěpánek (Germany) Benjamin Becker	(United States) John Isner (United States) Sam Querrey (Belgium) Olivier Rochus (Poland) Łukasz Kubot
20 Feb	Open 13; Marseille, France; ATP World Tour 250; Hard (i) – €512,750 – 28S/16D; Singles – Doubles	(Argentina) Juan Martín del Potro; 6–4, 6–4	(France) Michaël Llodra	(France) Jo-Wilfried Tsonga (Serbia) Janko Tipsarević	(France) Édouard Roger-Vasselin (France) Richard Gasquet (Croatia) Ivan Ljubičić (France) Albano Olivetti
20 Feb	Open 13; Marseille, France; ATP World Tour 250; Hard (i) – €512,750 – 28S/16D; Singles – Doubles	(France) Nicolas Mahut (France) Édouard Roger-Vasselin; 3–6, 6–3, [10–6]	(Germany) Dustin Brown (France) Jo-Wilfried Tsonga	(France) Jo-Wilfried Tsonga (Serbia) Janko Tipsarević	(France) Édouard Roger-Vasselin (France) Richard Gasquet (Croatia) Ivan Ljubičić (France) Albano Olivetti
20 Feb	Copa Claro; Buenos Aires, Argentina; ATP World Tour 250; Clay – $484,100 – 32S/16D; Singles – Doubles	(Spain) David Ferrer; 4–6, 6–3, 6–2	(Spain) Nicolás Almagro	(Argentina) David Nalbandian (Switzerland) Stanislas Wawrinka	(Chile) Fernando González (Argentina) Carlos Berlocq (Japan) Kei Nishikori (Russia) Igor Andreev
20 Feb	Copa Claro; Buenos Aires, Argentina; ATP World Tour 250; Clay – $484,100 – 32S/16D; Singles – Doubles	(Spain) David Marrero (Spain) Fernando Verdasco; 6–4, 6–4	(Slovakia) Michal Mertiňák (Brazil) André Sá	(Argentina) David Nalbandian (Switzerland) Stanislas Wawrinka	(Chile) Fernando González (Argentina) Carlos Berlocq (Japan) Kei Nishikori (Russia) Igor Andreev
27 Feb	Dubai Duty Free Tennis Championships; Dubai, United Arab Emirates; ATP World Tour 500; Hard – $1,700,475 – 32S/16D; Singles – Doubles	(Switzerland) Roger Federer; 7–5, 6–4	(United Kingdom) Andy Murray	(Serbia) Novak Djokovic (Argentina) Juan Martín del Potro	(Serbia) Janko Tipsarević (Czech Republic) Tomáš Berdych (France) Jo-Wilfried Tsonga (Russia) Mikhail Youzhny
27 Feb	Dubai Duty Free Tennis Championships; Dubai, United Arab Emirates; ATP World Tour 500; Hard – $1,700,475 – 32S/16D; Singles – Doubles	(India) Mahesh Bhupathi (India) Rohan Bopanna; 6–4, 3–6, [10–5]	(Poland) Mariusz Fyrstenberg (Poland) Marcin Matkowski	(Serbia) Novak Djokovic (Argentina) Juan Martín del Potro	(Serbia) Janko Tipsarević (Czech Republic) Tomáš Berdych (France) Jo-Wilfried Tsonga (Russia) Mikhail Youzhny
27 Feb	Abierto Mexicano Telcel; Acapulco, Mexico; ATP World Tour 500; Clay – $1,155,000 – 32S/16D; Singles – Doubles	(Spain) David Ferrer; 6–1, 6–2	(Spain) Fernando Verdasco	(Colombia) Santiago Giraldo (Switzerland) Stanislas Wawrinka	(Spain) Pablo Andújar (Argentina) Carlos Berlocq (France) Jérémy Chardy (Spain) Nicolás Almagro
27 Feb	Abierto Mexicano Telcel; Acapulco, Mexico; ATP World Tour 500; Clay – $1,155,000 – 32S/16D; Singles – Doubles	(Spain) David Marrero (Spain) Fernando Verdasco; 6–3, 6–4	(Spain) Marcel Granollers (Spain) Marc López	(Colombia) Santiago Giraldo (Switzerland) Stanislas Wawrinka	(Spain) Pablo Andújar (Argentina) Carlos Berlocq (France) Jérémy Chardy (Spain) Nicolás Almagro
27 Feb	Delray Beach International Tennis Championships; Delray Beach, United States; ATP World Tour 250; Hard – $442,500 – 32S/16D; Singles – Doubles	(South Africa) Kevin Anderson; 6–4, 7–6^{(7–2)}	(Australia) Marinko Matosevic	(United States) John Isner (Israel) Dudi Sela	(Australia) Bernard Tomic (United States) Andy Roddick (Latvia) Ernests Gulbis (Germany) Philipp Kohlschreiber
27 Feb	Delray Beach International Tennis Championships; Delray Beach, United States; ATP World Tour 250; Hard – $442,500 – 32S/16D; Singles – Doubles	(United Kingdom) Colin Fleming (United Kingdom) Ross Hutchins; 2–6, 7–6^{(7–5)}, [15–13]	(Slovakia) Michal Mertiňák (Brazil) André Sá	(United States) John Isner (Israel) Dudi Sela	(Australia) Bernard Tomic (United States) Andy Roddick (Latvia) Ernests Gulbis (Germany) Philipp Kohlschreiber

=== March ===
Week	Tournament	Champions	Runners-up	Semifinalists	Quarterfinalists
5 Mar; 12 Mar	BNP Paribas Open; Indian Wells, United States; ATP World Tour Masters 1000; Hard – $4,694,969 – 96S//32D; Singles – Doubles	(Switzerland) Roger Federer; 7–6^{(9–7)}, 6–3	(United States) John Isner	(Serbia) Novak Djokovic (Spain) Rafael Nadal	(Spain) Nicolás Almagro (France) Gilles Simon (Argentina) Juan Martín del Potro (Argentina) David Nalbandian
5 Mar; 12 Mar	BNP Paribas Open; Indian Wells, United States; ATP World Tour Masters 1000; Hard – $4,694,969 – 96S//32D; Singles – Doubles	(Spain) Marc López (Spain) Rafael Nadal; 6–2, 7–6^{(7–3)}	(United States) John Isner (United States) Sam Querrey	(Serbia) Novak Djokovic (Spain) Rafael Nadal	(Spain) Nicolás Almagro (France) Gilles Simon (Argentina) Juan Martín del Potro (Argentina) David Nalbandian
19 Mar; 26 Mar	Sony Ericsson Open; Key Biscayne, United States; ATP World Tour Masters 1000; Hard – $3,973,050 – 96S//32D; Singles – Doubles	(Serbia) Novak Djokovic; 6–1, 7–6^{(7–4)}	(United Kingdom) Andy Murray	(Argentina) Juan Mónaco (Spain) Rafael Nadal	(Spain) David Ferrer (United States) Mardy Fish (Serbia) Janko Tipsarević (France) Jo-Wilfried Tsonga
19 Mar; 26 Mar	Sony Ericsson Open; Key Biscayne, United States; ATP World Tour Masters 1000; Hard – $3,973,050 – 96S//32D; Singles – Doubles	(India) Leander Paes (Czech Republic) Radek Štěpánek; 3–6, 6–1, [10–8]	(Belarus) Max Mirnyi (Canada) Daniel Nestor	(Argentina) Juan Mónaco (Spain) Rafael Nadal	(Spain) David Ferrer (United States) Mardy Fish (Serbia) Janko Tipsarević (France) Jo-Wilfried Tsonga

=== April ===
Week	Tournament	Champions	Runners-up	Semifinalists	Quarterfinalists
2 Apr	Davis Cup by BNP Paribas Quarterfinals; Oropesa del Mar, Spain – clay Roquebrune-Cap-Martin, France – clay Prague, Czech Republic – clay (i); Buenos Aires, Argentina – clay	Quarterfinals winners Spain 4–1; United States 3–2; Czech Republic 4–1; Argentina 4–1	Quarterfinals losers Austria; France; Serbia; Croatia		
9 Apr	U.S. Men's Clay Court Championships; Houston, United States; ATP World Tour 250; Clay (maroon) – $442,500 – 28S/16D; Singles – Doubles	(Argentina) Juan Mónaco; 6–2, 3–6, 6–3	(United States) John Isner	(United States) Michael Russell (Spain) Feliciano López	(United States) Ryan Harrison (South Africa) Kevin Anderson (Argentina) Carlos Berlocq (United States) Ryan Sweeting
9 Apr	U.S. Men's Clay Court Championships; Houston, United States; ATP World Tour 250; Clay (maroon) – $442,500 – 28S/16D; Singles – Doubles	(United States) James Blake (United States) Sam Querrey; 7–6^{(16–14)}, 6–4	(Philippines) Treat Conrad Huey (United Kingdom) Dominic Inglot	(United States) Michael Russell (Spain) Feliciano López	(United States) Ryan Harrison (South Africa) Kevin Anderson (Argentina) Carlos Berlocq (United States) Ryan Sweeting
9 Apr	Grand Prix Hassan II; Casablanca, Morocco; ATP World Tour 250; Clay – €398,250 – 28S/16D; Singles – Doubles	(Spain) Pablo Andújar; 6–1, 7–6^{(7–5)}	(Spain) Albert Ramos	(Russia) Igor Andreev (Italy) Flavio Cipolla	(France) Jérémy Chardy (Spain) Guillermo García López (Spain) Sergio Gutiérrez Ferrol (France) Benoît Paire
9 Apr	Grand Prix Hassan II; Casablanca, Morocco; ATP World Tour 250; Clay – €398,250 – 28S/16D; Singles – Doubles	(Germany) Dustin Brown (Australia) Paul Hanley; 7–5, 6–3	(Italy) Daniele Bracciali (Italy) Fabio Fognini	(Russia) Igor Andreev (Italy) Flavio Cipolla	(France) Jérémy Chardy (Spain) Guillermo García López (Spain) Sergio Gutiérrez Ferrol (France) Benoît Paire
16 Apr	Monte-Carlo Rolex Masters; Roquebrune-Cap-Martin, France; ATP World Tour Masters 1000; Clay – €2,427,975 – 56S/28Q/24D; Singles – Doubles	(Spain) Rafael Nadal; 6–3, 6–1	(Serbia) Novak Djokovic	(Czech Republic) Tomáš Berdych (France) Gilles Simon	(Netherlands) Robin Haase (United Kingdom) Andy Murray (France) Jo-Wilfried Tsonga (Switzerland) Stanislas Wawrinka
16 Apr	Monte-Carlo Rolex Masters; Roquebrune-Cap-Martin, France; ATP World Tour Masters 1000; Clay – €2,427,975 – 56S/28Q/24D; Singles – Doubles	(United States) Bob Bryan (United States) Mike Bryan; 6–2, 6–3	(Belarus) Max Mirnyi (Canada) Daniel Nestor	(Czech Republic) Tomáš Berdych (France) Gilles Simon	(Netherlands) Robin Haase (United Kingdom) Andy Murray (France) Jo-Wilfried Tsonga (Switzerland) Stanislas Wawrinka
23 Apr	Barcelona Open BancSabadell; Barcelona, Spain; ATP World Tour 500; Clay – €1,627,500 – 56S/28Q/24D; Singles – Doubles	(Spain) Rafael Nadal; 7–6^{(7–1)}, 7–5	(Spain) David Ferrer	(Spain) Fernando Verdasco (Canada) Milos Raonic	(Serbia) Janko Tipsarević (Japan) Kei Nishikori (Spain) Feliciano López (United Kingdom) Andy Murray
23 Apr	Barcelona Open BancSabadell; Barcelona, Spain; ATP World Tour 500; Clay – €1,627,500 – 56S/28Q/24D; Singles – Doubles	(Poland) Mariusz Fyrstenberg (Poland) Marcin Matkowski; 2–6, 7–6^{(9–7)}, [10–8]	(Spain) Marcel Granollers (Spain) Marc López	(Spain) Fernando Verdasco (Canada) Milos Raonic	(Serbia) Janko Tipsarević (Japan) Kei Nishikori (Spain) Feliciano López (United Kingdom) Andy Murray
23 Apr	BRD Năstase Țiriac Trophy; Bucharest, Romania; ATP World Tour 250; Clay – €398,250 – 28S/16D; Singles – Doubles	(France) Gilles Simon; 6–4, 6–3	(Italy) Fabio Fognini	(Germany) Matthias Bachinger (Hungary) Attila Balázs	(Poland) Łukasz Kubot (Germany) Daniel Brands (Italy) Andreas Seppi (Belgium) Xavier Malisse
23 Apr	BRD Năstase Țiriac Trophy; Bucharest, Romania; ATP World Tour 250; Clay – €398,250 – 28S/16D; Singles – Doubles	(Sweden) Robert Lindstedt (Romania) Horia Tecău; 7–6^{(7–2)}, 6–3	(France) Jérémy Chardy (Poland) Łukasz Kubot	(Germany) Matthias Bachinger (Hungary) Attila Balázs	(Poland) Łukasz Kubot (Germany) Daniel Brands (Italy) Andreas Seppi (Belgium) Xavier Malisse
30 Apr	BMW Open; Munich, Germany; ATP World Tour 250; Clay – €398,250 – 28S/16D; Singles – Doubles	(Germany) Philipp Kohlschreiber; 7–6^{(10–8)}, 6–3	(Croatia) Marin Čilić	(Germany) Tommy Haas (Spain) Feliciano López	(Cyprus) Marcos Baghdatis (Russia) Mikhail Youzhny (Australia) Marinko Matosevic (Australia) Bernard Tomic
30 Apr	BMW Open; Munich, Germany; ATP World Tour 250; Clay – €398,250 – 28S/16D; Singles – Doubles	(Czech Republic) František Čermák (Slovakia) Filip Polášek; 6–4, 7–5	(Belgium) Xavier Malisse (Belgium) Dick Norman	(Germany) Tommy Haas (Spain) Feliciano López	(Cyprus) Marcos Baghdatis (Russia) Mikhail Youzhny (Australia) Marinko Matosevic (Australia) Bernard Tomic
30 Apr	Serbia Open; Belgrade, Serbia; ATP World Tour 250; Clay – €366,950 – 28S/16D; Singles – Doubles	(Italy) Andreas Seppi; 6–3, 6–2	(France) Benoît Paire	(Spain) Pablo Andújar (Argentina) David Nalbandian	(Czech Republic) Lukáš Rosol (Finland) Jarkko Nieminen (Brazil) João Souza (Luxembourg) Gilles Müller
30 Apr	Serbia Open; Belgrade, Serbia; ATP World Tour 250; Clay – €366,950 – 28S/16D; Singles – Doubles	(Israel) Jonathan Erlich (Israel) Andy Ram; 4–6, 6–2, [10–6]	(Germany) Martin Emmrich (Sweden) Andreas Siljeström	(Spain) Pablo Andújar (Argentina) David Nalbandian	(Czech Republic) Lukáš Rosol (Finland) Jarkko Nieminen (Brazil) João Souza (Luxembourg) Gilles Müller
30 Apr	Estoril Open; Oeiras, Portugal; ATP World Tour 250; Clay – €398,250 – 28S/16D; Singles – Doubles	(Argentina) Juan Martín del Potro; 6–4, 6–2	(France) Richard Gasquet	(Switzerland) Stanislas Wawrinka (Spain) Albert Ramos	(Spain) Albert Montañés (Netherlands) Robin Haase (Portugal) João Sousa (Spain) Daniel Muñoz de la Nava
30 Apr	Estoril Open; Oeiras, Portugal; ATP World Tour 250; Clay – €398,250 – 28S/16D; Singles – Doubles	(Pakistan) Aisam-ul-Haq Qureshi (Netherlands) Jean-Julien Rojer; 7–5, 7–5	(Austria) Julian Knowle (Spain) David Marrero	(Switzerland) Stanislas Wawrinka (Spain) Albert Ramos	(Spain) Albert Montañés (Netherlands) Robin Haase (Portugal) João Sousa (Spain) Daniel Muñoz de la Nava

=== May ===
Week	Tournament	Champions	Runners-up	Semifinalists	Quarterfinalists
7 May	Mutua Madrid Open; Madrid, Spain; ATP World Tour Masters 1000; Clay (blue) – €3,090,150 – 56S/28Q/24D; Singles – Doubles	(Switzerland) Roger Federer; 3–6, 7–5, 7–5	(Czech Republic) Tomáš Berdych	(Serbia) Janko Tipsarević (Argentina) Juan Martín del Potro	(Serbia) Novak Djokovic (Spain) David Ferrer (Ukraine) Alexandr Dolgopolov (Spain) Fernando Verdasco
7 May	Mutua Madrid Open; Madrid, Spain; ATP World Tour Masters 1000; Clay (blue) – €3,090,150 – 56S/28Q/24D; Singles – Doubles	(Poland) Mariusz Fyrstenberg (Poland) Marcin Matkowski; 6–3, 6–4	(Sweden) Robert Lindstedt (Romania) Horia Tecău	(Serbia) Janko Tipsarević (Argentina) Juan Martín del Potro	(Serbia) Novak Djokovic (Spain) David Ferrer (Ukraine) Alexandr Dolgopolov (Spain) Fernando Verdasco
14 May	Internazionali BNL d'Italia; Rome, Italy; ATP World Tour Masters 1000; Clay – €2,427,975 – 56S/28Q/24D; Singles – Doubles	(Spain) Rafael Nadal; 7–5, 6–3	(Serbia) Novak Djokovic	(Switzerland) Roger Federer (Spain) David Ferrer	(France) Jo-Wilfried Tsonga (Italy) Andreas Seppi (France) Richard Gasquet (Czech Republic) Tomáš Berdych
14 May	Internazionali BNL d'Italia; Rome, Italy; ATP World Tour Masters 1000; Clay – €2,427,975 – 56S/28Q/24D; Singles – Doubles	(Spain) Marcel Granollers (Spain) Marc López; 6–3, 6–2	(Poland) Łukasz Kubot (Serbia) Janko Tipsarević	(Switzerland) Roger Federer (Spain) David Ferrer	(France) Jo-Wilfried Tsonga (Italy) Andreas Seppi (France) Richard Gasquet (Czech Republic) Tomáš Berdych
21 May	Power Horse World Team Cup; Düsseldorf, Germany; ATP World Team Championship; Clay – €800,000 – 8 teams (RR)	Serbia; 3–0	Czech Republic	Round Robin (Red Group) Argentina; United States; Japan	Round Robin (Blue Group) Germany; Russia; Croatia
21 May	Open de Nice Côte d'Azur; Nice, France; ATP World Tour 250; Clay – €398,250 – 28S/16D; Singles – Doubles	(Spain) Nicolás Almagro; 6–3, 6–2	(United States) Brian Baker	(Russia) Nikolay Davydenko (France) Gilles Simon	(United States) John Isner (Kazakhstan) Mikhail Kukushkin (Belgium) Steve Darcis (Brazil) Thomaz Bellucci
21 May	Open de Nice Côte d'Azur; Nice, France; ATP World Tour 250; Clay – €398,250 – 28S/16D; Singles – Doubles	(United States) Bob Bryan (United States) Mike Bryan; 7–6^{(7–5)}, 6–3	(Austria) Oliver Marach (Slovakia) Filip Polášek	(Russia) Nikolay Davydenko (France) Gilles Simon	(United States) John Isner (Kazakhstan) Mikhail Kukushkin (Belgium) Steve Darcis (Brazil) Thomaz Bellucci
28 May; 4 Jun	French Open; Paris, France; Grand Slam; Clay – €6,555,000; 128S/128Q/64D/32X; Singles – Doubles – Mixed doubles	(Spain) Rafael Nadal; 6–4, 6–3, 2–6, 7–5	(Serbia) Novak Djokovic	(Switzerland) Roger Federer (Spain) David Ferrer	(France) Jo-Wilfried Tsonga (Argentina) Juan Martín del Potro (United Kingdom) Andy Murray (Spain) Nicolás Almagro
28 May; 4 Jun	French Open; Paris, France; Grand Slam; Clay – €6,555,000; 128S/128Q/64D/32X; Singles – Doubles – Mixed doubles	(Belarus) Max Mirnyi (Canada) Daniel Nestor; 6–4, 6–4	(United States) Bob Bryan (United States) Mike Bryan	(Switzerland) Roger Federer (Spain) David Ferrer	(France) Jo-Wilfried Tsonga (Argentina) Juan Martín del Potro (United Kingdom) Andy Murray (Spain) Nicolás Almagro
28 May; 4 Jun	French Open; Paris, France; Grand Slam; Clay – €6,555,000; 128S/128Q/64D/32X; Singles – Doubles – Mixed doubles	(India) Sania Mirza (India) Mahesh Bhupathi; 7–6^{(7–3)}, 6–1	(Poland) Klaudia Jans-Ignacik (Mexico) Santiago González	(Switzerland) Roger Federer (Spain) David Ferrer	(France) Jo-Wilfried Tsonga (Argentina) Juan Martín del Potro (United Kingdom) Andy Murray (Spain) Nicolás Almagro

=== June ===
Week	Tournament	Champions	Runners-up	Semifinalists	Quarterfinalists
11 Jun	Gerry Weber Open; Halle, Germany; ATP World Tour 250; Grass – €663,750 – 28S/16D; Singles – Doubles	(Germany) Tommy Haas; 7–6^{(7–5)}, 6–4	(Switzerland) Roger Federer	(Germany) Philipp Kohlschreiber (Russia) Mikhail Youzhny	(Spain) Rafael Nadal (Czech Republic) Tomáš Berdych (Czech Republic) Radek Štěpánek (Canada) Milos Raonic
11 Jun	Gerry Weber Open; Halle, Germany; ATP World Tour 250; Grass – €663,750 – 28S/16D; Singles – Doubles	(Pakistan) Aisam-ul-Haq Qureshi (Netherlands) Jean-Julien Rojer; 6–3, 6–4	(Philippines) Treat Conrad Huey (United States) Scott Lipsky	(Germany) Philipp Kohlschreiber (Russia) Mikhail Youzhny	(Spain) Rafael Nadal (Czech Republic) Tomáš Berdych (Czech Republic) Radek Štěpánek (Canada) Milos Raonic
11 Jun	Aegon Championships; London, United Kingdom; ATP World Tour 250; Grass – €625,300 – 56S/24D; Singles – Doubles	(Croatia) Marin Čilić; 6–7^{(3–7)}, 4–3 defaulted	(Argentina) David Nalbandian	(Bulgaria) Grigor Dimitrov (United States) Sam Querrey	(South Africa) Kevin Anderson (Belgium) Xavier Malisse (Chinese Taipei) Lu Yen-hsun (Croatia) Ivan Dodig
11 Jun	Aegon Championships; London, United Kingdom; ATP World Tour 250; Grass – €625,300 – 56S/24D; Singles – Doubles	(Belarus) Max Mirnyi (Canada) Daniel Nestor; 6–3, 6–4	(United States) Bob Bryan (United States) Mike Bryan	(Bulgaria) Grigor Dimitrov (United States) Sam Querrey	(South Africa) Kevin Anderson (Belgium) Xavier Malisse (Chinese Taipei) Lu Yen-hsun (Croatia) Ivan Dodig
18 Jun	UNICEF Open 's-Hertogenbosch, Netherlands; ATP World Tour 250; Grass – €398,250 – 32S/16D; Singles – Doubles	(Spain) David Ferrer; 6–3, 6–4	(Germany) Philipp Petzschner	(France) Benoît Paire (Belgium) Xavier Malisse	(Netherlands) Igor Sijsling (Japan) Tatsuma Ito (France) Édouard Roger-Vasselin (Luxembourg) Gilles Müller
18 Jun	UNICEF Open 's-Hertogenbosch, Netherlands; ATP World Tour 250; Grass – €398,250 – 32S/16D; Singles – Doubles	(Sweden) Robert Lindstedt (Romania) Horia Tecău; 6–3, 7–6^{(7–1)}	(Colombia) Juan Sebastián Cabal (Russia) Dmitry Tursunov	(France) Benoît Paire (Belgium) Xavier Malisse	(Netherlands) Igor Sijsling (Japan) Tatsuma Ito (France) Édouard Roger-Vasselin (Luxembourg) Gilles Müller
18 Jun	Aegon International; Eastbourne, United Kingdom; ATP World Tour 250; Grass – €403,950 – 28S/16D; Singles – Doubles	(United States) Andy Roddick; 6–3, 6–2	(Italy) Andreas Seppi	(Belgium) Steve Darcis (United States) Ryan Harrison	(Australia) Marinko Matosevic (Italy) Fabio Fognini (Germany) Philipp Kohlschreiber (Uzbekistan) Denis Istomin
18 Jun	Aegon International; Eastbourne, United Kingdom; ATP World Tour 250; Grass – €403,950 – 28S/16D; Singles – Doubles	(United Kingdom) Colin Fleming (United Kingdom) Ross Hutchins; 6–4, 6–3	(United Kingdom) Jamie Delgado (United Kingdom) Ken Skupski	(Belgium) Steve Darcis (United States) Ryan Harrison	(Australia) Marinko Matosevic (Italy) Fabio Fognini (Germany) Philipp Kohlschreiber (Uzbekistan) Denis Istomin
25 Jun; 2 Jul	The Championships, Wimbledon; London, United Kingdom; Grand Slam; Grass – £6,631,000 (financial commitment); 128S/128Q/64D/48X; Singles – Doubles – Mixed doubles	(Switzerland) Roger Federer; 4–6, 7–5, 6–3, 6–4	(United Kingdom) Andy Murray	(Serbia) Novak Djokovic (France) Jo-Wilfried Tsonga	(Germany) Florian Mayer (Russia) Mikhail Youzhny (Spain) David Ferrer (Germany) Philipp Kohlschreiber
25 Jun; 2 Jul	The Championships, Wimbledon; London, United Kingdom; Grand Slam; Grass – £6,631,000 (financial commitment); 128S/128Q/64D/48X; Singles – Doubles – Mixed doubles	(United Kingdom) Jonathan Marray (Denmark) Frederik Nielsen; 4–6, 6–4, 7–6^{(7–5)}, 6–7^{(5–7)}, 6–3	(Sweden) Robert Lindstedt (Romania) Horia Tecău	(Serbia) Novak Djokovic (France) Jo-Wilfried Tsonga	(Germany) Florian Mayer (Russia) Mikhail Youzhny (Spain) David Ferrer (Germany) Philipp Kohlschreiber
25 Jun; 2 Jul	The Championships, Wimbledon; London, United Kingdom; Grand Slam; Grass – £6,631,000 (financial commitment); 128S/128Q/64D/48X; Singles – Doubles – Mixed doubles	(United States) Lisa Raymond (United States) Mike Bryan; 6–3, 5–7, 6–4	(Russia) Elena Vesnina (India) Leander Paes	(Serbia) Novak Djokovic (France) Jo-Wilfried Tsonga	(Germany) Florian Mayer (Russia) Mikhail Youzhny (Spain) David Ferrer (Germany) Philipp Kohlschreiber

=== July ===
Week	Tournament	Champions	Runners-up	Semifinalists	Quarterfinalists
9 Jul	Campbell's Hall of Fame Tennis Championships; Newport, United States; ATP World Tour 250; Grass – $398,250 – 32S/16D; Singles – Doubles	(United States) John Isner; 7–6^{(7–1)}, 6–4	(Australia) Lleyton Hewitt	(United States) Ryan Harrison (United States) Rajeev Ram	(South Africa) Izak van der Merwe (Germany) Benjamin Becker (Israel) Dudi Sela (Japan) Kei Nishikori
9 Jul	Campbell's Hall of Fame Tennis Championships; Newport, United States; ATP World Tour 250; Grass – $398,250 – 32S/16D; Singles – Doubles	(Mexico) Santiago González (United States) Scott Lipsky; 7–6^{(7–5)}, 6–3	(United Kingdom) Colin Fleming (United Kingdom) Ross Hutchins	(United States) Ryan Harrison (United States) Rajeev Ram	(South Africa) Izak van der Merwe (Germany) Benjamin Becker (Israel) Dudi Sela (Japan) Kei Nishikori
9 Jul	MercedesCup; Stuttgart, Germany; ATP World Tour 250; Clay – €358,425 – 28S/16D; Singles – Doubles	(Serbia) Janko Tipsarević; 6–4, 5–7, 6–3	(Argentina) Juan Mónaco	(Brazil) Thomaz Bellucci (Spain) Guillermo García López	(Germany) Björn Phau (Germany) Cedrik-Marcel Stebe (Germany) Dustin Brown (Slovakia) Pavol Červenák
9 Jul	MercedesCup; Stuttgart, Germany; ATP World Tour 250; Clay – €358,425 – 28S/16D; Singles – Doubles	(France) Jérémy Chardy (Poland) Łukasz Kubot; 6–1, 6–3	(Slovakia) Michal Mertiňák (Brazil) André Sá	(Brazil) Thomaz Bellucci (Spain) Guillermo García López	(Germany) Björn Phau (Germany) Cedrik-Marcel Stebe (Germany) Dustin Brown (Slovakia) Pavol Červenák
9 Jul	SkiStar Swedish Open; Båstad, Sweden; ATP World Tour 250; Clay – €358,425 – 28S/16D; Singles – Doubles	(Spain) David Ferrer; 6–2, 6–2	(Spain) Nicolás Almagro	(Bulgaria) Grigor Dimitrov (Czech Republic) Jan Hájek	(Spain) Tommy Robredo (Spain) Albert Ramos (Estonia) Jürgen Zopp (Spain) Daniel Gimeno Traver
9 Jul	SkiStar Swedish Open; Båstad, Sweden; ATP World Tour 250; Clay – €358,425 – 28S/16D; Singles – Doubles	(Sweden) Robert Lindstedt (Romania) Horia Tecău; 6–3, 7–6^{(7–5)}	(Austria) Alexander Peya (Brazil) Bruno Soares	(Bulgaria) Grigor Dimitrov (Czech Republic) Jan Hájek	(Spain) Tommy Robredo (Spain) Albert Ramos (Estonia) Jürgen Zopp (Spain) Daniel Gimeno Traver
9 Jul	ATP Vegeta Croatia Open Umag; Umag, Croatia; ATP World Tour 250; Clay – €358,425 – 28S/16D; Singles – Doubles	(Croatia) Marin Čilić; 6–4, 6–2	(Spain) Marcel Granollers	(Spain) Fernando Verdasco (Ukraine) Alexandr Dolgopolov	(Russia) Andrey Kuznetsov (Germany) Matthias Bachinger (Argentina) Carlos Berlocq (United States) Wayne Odesnik
9 Jul	ATP Vegeta Croatia Open Umag; Umag, Croatia; ATP World Tour 250; Clay – €358,425 – 28S/16D; Singles – Doubles	(Spain) David Marrero (Spain) Fernando Verdasco; 6–3, 7–6^{(7–4)}	(Spain) Marcel Granollers (Spain) Marc López	(Spain) Fernando Verdasco (Ukraine) Alexandr Dolgopolov	(Russia) Andrey Kuznetsov (Germany) Matthias Bachinger (Argentina) Carlos Berlocq (United States) Wayne Odesnik
16 Jul	bet-at-home Open; Hamburg, Germany; ATP World Tour 500; Clay – €900,000 – 32S/16D; Singles – Doubles	(Argentina) Juan Mónaco; 7–5, 6–4	(Germany) Tommy Haas	(Spain) Nicolás Almagro (Croatia) Marin Čilić	(Germany) Philipp Kohlschreiber (France) Jérémy Chardy (Spain) Albert Ramos (Germany) Florian Mayer
16 Jul	bet-at-home Open; Hamburg, Germany; ATP World Tour 500; Clay – €900,000 – 32S/16D; Singles – Doubles	(Spain) David Marrero (Spain) Fernando Verdasco; 6–4, 6–3	(Brazil) Rogério Dutra da Silva (Spain) Daniel Muñoz de la Nava	(Spain) Nicolás Almagro (Croatia) Marin Čilić	(Germany) Philipp Kohlschreiber (France) Jérémy Chardy (Spain) Albert Ramos (Germany) Florian Mayer
16 Jul	BB&T Atlanta Open; Atlanta, United States; ATP World Tour 250; Hard – $477,900 – 28S/16D; Singles – Doubles	(United States) Andy Roddick; 1–6, 7–6^{(7–2)}, 6–2	(Luxembourg) Gilles Müller	(United States) John Isner (Japan) Go Soeda	(United States) Jack Sock (United States) Michael Russell (Japan) Kei Nishikori (Australia) Matthew Ebden
16 Jul	BB&T Atlanta Open; Atlanta, United States; ATP World Tour 250; Hard – $477,900 – 28S/16D; Singles – Doubles	(Australia) Matthew Ebden (United States) Ryan Harrison; 6–3, 3–6, [10–6]	(Belgium) Xavier Malisse (United States) Michael Russell	(United States) John Isner (Japan) Go Soeda	(United States) Jack Sock (United States) Michael Russell (Japan) Kei Nishikori (Australia) Matthew Ebden
16 Jul	Crédit Agricole Suisse Open Gstaad; Gstaad, Switzerland; ATP World Tour 250; Clay – €358,425 – 28S/16D; Singles – Doubles	(Brazil) Thomaz Bellucci; 6–7^{(6–8)}, 6–4, 6–2	(Serbia) Janko Tipsarević	(France) Paul-Henri Mathieu (Bulgaria) Grigor Dimitrov	(Czech Republic) Jan Hernych (Latvia) Ernests Gulbis (Spain) Feliciano López (Poland) Łukasz Kubot
16 Jul	Crédit Agricole Suisse Open Gstaad; Gstaad, Switzerland; ATP World Tour 250; Clay – €358,425 – 28S/16D; Singles – Doubles	(Spain) Marcel Granollers (Spain) Marc López; 6–4, 7–6^{(11–9)}	(Colombia) Robert Farah (Colombia) Santiago Giraldo	(France) Paul-Henri Mathieu (Bulgaria) Grigor Dimitrov	(Czech Republic) Jan Hernych (Latvia) Ernests Gulbis (Spain) Feliciano López (Poland) Łukasz Kubot
23 Jul	Farmers Classic; Los Angeles, United States; ATP World Tour 250; Hard – $557,550 – 28S/16D; Singles – Doubles	(United States) Sam Querrey; 6–0, 6–2	(Lithuania) Ričardas Berankis	(Australia) Marinko Matosevic (United States) Rajeev Ram	(United States) Michael Russell (France) Nicolas Mahut (Argentina) Leonardo Mayer (Belgium) Xavier Malisse
23 Jul	Farmers Classic; Los Angeles, United States; ATP World Tour 250; Hard – $557,550 – 28S/16D; Singles – Doubles	(Belgium) Ruben Bemelmans (Belgium) Xavier Malisse; 7–6^{(7–5)}, 4–6, [10–4]	(United Kingdom) Jamie Delgado (United Kingdom) Ken Skupski	(Australia) Marinko Matosevic (United States) Rajeev Ram	(United States) Michael Russell (France) Nicolas Mahut (Argentina) Leonardo Mayer (Belgium) Xavier Malisse
23 Jul	bet-at-home Cup; Kitzbühel, Austria; ATP World Tour 250; Clay – €358,425 – 28S/26Q/16D; Singles – Doubles	(Netherlands) Robin Haase; 6–7^{(2–7)}, 6–3, 6–2	(Germany) Philipp Kohlschreiber	(Italy) Filippo Volandri (Slovakia) Martin Kližan	(Czech Republic) Lukáš Rosol (Brazil) Rogério Dutra da Silva (United States) Wayne Odesnik (Italy) Simone Bolelli
23 Jul	bet-at-home Cup; Kitzbühel, Austria; ATP World Tour 250; Clay – €358,425 – 28S/26Q/16D; Singles – Doubles	(Czech Republic) František Čermák (Austria) Julian Knowle; 7–6^{(7–4)}, 3–6, [12–10]	(Germany) Dustin Brown (Australia) Paul Hanley	(Italy) Filippo Volandri (Slovakia) Martin Kližan	(Czech Republic) Lukáš Rosol (Brazil) Rogério Dutra da Silva (United States) Wayne Odesnik (Italy) Simone Bolelli
30 Jul	Summer Olympic Games; London, United Kingdom; Olympic Games; Grass – 64S/32D/16X; Singles – Doubles – Mixed doubles	Gold	Silver	Bronze	Quarterfinalists
30 Jul	Summer Olympic Games; London, United Kingdom; Olympic Games; Grass – 64S/32D/16X; Singles – Doubles – Mixed doubles	(United Kingdom) Andy Murray; 6–2, 6–1, 6–4	(Switzerland) Roger Federer	(Argentina) Juan Martín del Potro; 7–5, 6–4 Fourth place (Serbia) Novak Djokovic	(United States) John Isner (Japan) Kei Nishikori (Spain) Nicolás Almagro (France) Jo-Wilfried Tsonga
30 Jul	Summer Olympic Games; London, United Kingdom; Olympic Games; Grass – 64S/32D/16X; Singles – Doubles – Mixed doubles	(United States) Bob Bryan (United States) Mike Bryan; 6–4, 7–6^{(7–4)}	(France) Michaël Llodra (France) Jo-Wilfried Tsonga	(Argentina) Juan Martín del Potro; 7–5, 6–4 Fourth place (Serbia) Novak Djokovic	(United States) John Isner (Japan) Kei Nishikori (Spain) Nicolás Almagro (France) Jo-Wilfried Tsonga
30 Jul	Summer Olympic Games; London, United Kingdom; Olympic Games; Grass – 64S/32D/16X; Singles – Doubles – Mixed doubles	(Belarus) Victoria Azarenka (Belarus) Max Mirnyi; 2–6, 6–3, [10–8]	(United Kingdom) Laura Robson (United Kingdom) Andy Murray	(Argentina) Juan Martín del Potro; 7–5, 6–4 Fourth place (Serbia) Novak Djokovic	(United States) John Isner (Japan) Kei Nishikori (Spain) Nicolás Almagro (France) Jo-Wilfried Tsonga
30 Jul	Citi Open; Washington, D.C., United States; ATP World Tour 500; Hard – $1,049,760 – 32S/16D; Singles – Doubles	(Ukraine) Alexandr Dolgopolov; 6–7^{(7–9)}, 6–4, 6–1	(Germany) Tommy Haas	(United States) Mardy Fish (United States) Sam Querrey	(Belgium) Xavier Malisse (Germany) Tobias Kamke (South Africa) Kevin Anderson (United States) James Blake
30 Jul	Citi Open; Washington, D.C., United States; ATP World Tour 500; Hard – $1,049,760 – 32S/16D; Singles – Doubles	(Philippines) Treat Conrad Huey (United Kingdom) Dominic Inglot; 7–6^{(9–7)}, 6–7^{(9–11)}, [10–5]	(South Africa) Kevin Anderson (United States) Sam Querrey	(United States) Mardy Fish (United States) Sam Querrey	(Belgium) Xavier Malisse (Germany) Tobias Kamke (South Africa) Kevin Anderson (United States) James Blake

=== August ===
Week	Tournament	Champions	Runners-up	Semifinalists	Quarterfinalists
6 Aug	Rogers Cup; Toronto, Canada; ATP World Tour Masters 1000; Hard – $2,648,700 – 48S/24D; Singles – Doubles	(Serbia) Novak Djokovic; 6–3, 6–2	(France) Richard Gasquet	(Serbia) Janko Tipsarević (United States) John Isner	(Germany) Tommy Haas (Spain) Marcel Granollers (United States) Mardy Fish (Canada) Milos Raonic
6 Aug	Rogers Cup; Toronto, Canada; ATP World Tour Masters 1000; Hard – $2,648,700 – 48S/24D; Singles – Doubles	(United States) Bob Bryan (United States) Mike Bryan; 6–1, 4–6, [12–10]	(Spain) Marcel Granollers (Spain) Marc López	(Serbia) Janko Tipsarević (United States) John Isner	(Germany) Tommy Haas (Spain) Marcel Granollers (United States) Mardy Fish (Canada) Milos Raonic
13 Aug	Western & Southern Open; Mason, United States; ATP World Tour Masters 1000; Hard – $2,825,280 – 56S/28Q/24D; Singles – Doubles	(Switzerland) Roger Federer; 6–0, 7–6^{(9–7)}	(Serbia) Novak Djokovic	(Switzerland) Stanislas Wawrinka (Argentina) Juan Martín del Potro	(United States) Mardy Fish (Canada) Milos Raonic (France) Jérémy Chardy (Croatia) Marin Čilić
13 Aug	Western & Southern Open; Mason, United States; ATP World Tour Masters 1000; Hard – $2,825,280 – 56S/28Q/24D; Singles – Doubles	(Sweden) Robert Lindstedt (Romania) Horia Tecău; 6–4, 6–4	(India) Mahesh Bhupathi (India) Rohan Bopanna	(Switzerland) Stanislas Wawrinka (Argentina) Juan Martín del Potro	(United States) Mardy Fish (Canada) Milos Raonic (France) Jérémy Chardy (Croatia) Marin Čilić
20 Aug	Winston-Salem Open; Winston-Salem, United States; ATP World Tour 250; Hard – $553,125 – 48S/16D; Singles – Doubles	(United States) John Isner; 3–6, 6–4, 7–6^{(11–9)}	(Czech Republic) Tomáš Berdych	(France) Jo-Wilfried Tsonga (United States) Sam Querrey	(Spain) Marcel Granollers (Belgium) David Goffin (Ukraine) Alexandr Dolgopolov (Belgium) Steve Darcis
20 Aug	Winston-Salem Open; Winston-Salem, United States; ATP World Tour 250; Hard – $553,125 – 48S/16D; Singles – Doubles	(Mexico) Santiago González (United States) Scott Lipsky; 6–3, 4–6, [10–2]	(Spain) Pablo Andújar (Argentina) Leonardo Mayer	(France) Jo-Wilfried Tsonga (United States) Sam Querrey	(Spain) Marcel Granollers (Belgium) David Goffin (Ukraine) Alexandr Dolgopolov (Belgium) Steve Darcis
27 Aug; 3 Sep	US Open; New York City, United States; Grand Slam; Hard – $11,777,000; 128S/128Q/64D/32X; Singles – Doubles – Mixed doubles	(United Kingdom) Andy Murray; 7–6^{(12–10)}, 7–5, 2–6, 3–6, 6–2	(Serbia) Novak Djokovic	(Czech Republic) Tomáš Berdych (Spain) David Ferrer	(Switzerland) Roger Federer (Croatia) Marin Čilić (Serbia) Janko Tipsarević (Argentina) Juan Martín del Potro
27 Aug; 3 Sep	US Open; New York City, United States; Grand Slam; Hard – $11,777,000; 128S/128Q/64D/32X; Singles – Doubles – Mixed doubles	(United States) Bob Bryan (United States) Mike Bryan; 6–3, 6–4	(India) Leander Paes (Czech Republic) Radek Štěpánek	(Czech Republic) Tomáš Berdych (Spain) David Ferrer	(Switzerland) Roger Federer (Croatia) Marin Čilić (Serbia) Janko Tipsarević (Argentina) Juan Martín del Potro
27 Aug; 3 Sep	US Open; New York City, United States; Grand Slam; Hard – $11,777,000; 128S/128Q/64D/32X; Singles – Doubles – Mixed doubles	(Russia) Ekaterina Makarova (Brazil) Bruno Soares; 6–7^{(8–10)}, 6–1, [12–10]	(Czech Republic) Květa Peschke (Poland) Marcin Matkowski	(Czech Republic) Tomáš Berdych (Spain) David Ferrer	(Switzerland) Roger Federer (Croatia) Marin Čilić (Serbia) Janko Tipsarević (Argentina) Juan Martín del Potro

=== September ===
Week	Tournament	Champions	Runners-up	Semifinalists	Quarterfinalists
10 Sep	Davis Cup by BNP Paribas Semifinals; Gijón, Spain – clay Buenos Aires, Argentina – clay	Semifinals winners Spain 3–1; Czech Republic 3–2	Semifinals losers United States; Argentina		
17 Sep	Moselle Open; Metz, France; ATP World Tour 250; Hard (i) – €398,250 – 28S/16D; Singles – Doubles	(France) Jo-Wilfried Tsonga; 6–1, 6–2	(Italy) Andreas Seppi	(Russia) Nikolay Davydenko (France) Gaël Monfils	(United States) Jesse Levine (Croatia) Ivo Karlović (Germany) Florian Mayer (Germany) Philipp Kohlschreiber
17 Sep	Moselle Open; Metz, France; ATP World Tour 250; Hard (i) – €398,250 – 28S/16D; Singles – Doubles	(France) Nicolas Mahut (France) Édouard Roger-Vasselin; 7–6^{(7–3)}, 6–4	(Sweden) Johan Brunström (Denmark) Frederik Nielsen	(Russia) Nikolay Davydenko (France) Gaël Monfils	(United States) Jesse Levine (Croatia) Ivo Karlović (Germany) Florian Mayer (Germany) Philipp Kohlschreiber
17 Sep	St. Petersburg Open; Saint Petersburg, Russia; ATP World Tour 250; Hard (i) – $410,850 – 32S/16D; Singles – Doubles	(Slovakia) Martin Kližan; 6–2, 6–3	(Italy) Fabio Fognini	(Russia) Mikhail Youzhny (Spain) Daniel Gimeno Traver	(Spain) Guillermo García López (Lithuania) Ričardas Berankis (Spain) Roberto Bautista Agut (Italy) Flavio Cipolla
17 Sep	St. Petersburg Open; Saint Petersburg, Russia; ATP World Tour 250; Hard (i) – $410,850 – 32S/16D; Singles – Doubles	(United States) Rajeev Ram (Serbia) Nenad Zimonjić; 6–2, 4–6, [10–6]	(Slovakia) Lukáš Lacko (Slovakia) Igor Zelenay	(Russia) Mikhail Youzhny (Spain) Daniel Gimeno Traver	(Spain) Guillermo García López (Lithuania) Ričardas Berankis (Spain) Roberto Bautista Agut (Italy) Flavio Cipolla
24 Sep	PTT Thailand Open; Bangkok, Thailand; ATP World Tour 250; Hard (i) – $551,000 – 28S/16D; Singles – Doubles	(France) Richard Gasquet; 6–2, 6–1	(France) Gilles Simon	(Serbia) Janko Tipsarević (Finland) Jarkko Nieminen	(Spain) Fernando Verdasco (France) Gaël Monfils (Canada) Milos Raonic (Australia) Bernard Tomic
24 Sep	PTT Thailand Open; Bangkok, Thailand; ATP World Tour 250; Hard (i) – $551,000 – 28S/16D; Singles – Doubles	(Chinese Taipei) Lu Yen-hsun (Thailand) Danai Udomchoke; 6–3, 6–4	(United States) Eric Butorac (Australia) Paul Hanley	(Serbia) Janko Tipsarević (Finland) Jarkko Nieminen	(Spain) Fernando Verdasco (France) Gaël Monfils (Canada) Milos Raonic (Australia) Bernard Tomic
24 Sep	Malaysian Open; Kuala Lumpur, Malaysia; ATP World Tour 250; Hard (i) – $850,000 – 28S/16D; Singles – Doubles	(Argentina) Juan Mónaco; 7–5, 4–6, 6–3	(France) Julien Benneteau	(Spain) David Ferrer (Japan) Kei Nishikori	(Netherlands) Igor Sijsling (Colombia) Alejandro Falla (Russia) Nikolay Davydenko (Canada) Vasek Pospisil
24 Sep	Malaysian Open; Kuala Lumpur, Malaysia; ATP World Tour 250; Hard (i) – $850,000 – 28S/16D; Singles – Doubles	(Austria) Alexander Peya (Brazil) Bruno Soares; 5–7, 7–5, [10–7]	(United Kingdom) Colin Fleming (United Kingdom) Ross Hutchins	(Spain) David Ferrer (Japan) Kei Nishikori	(Netherlands) Igor Sijsling (Colombia) Alejandro Falla (Russia) Nikolay Davydenko (Canada) Vasek Pospisil

=== October ===
Week	Tournament	Champions	Runners-up	Semifinalists	Quarterfinalists
1 Oct	China Open; Beijing, China; ATP World Tour 500; Hard – $2,205,000 – 32S/16D; Singles – Doubles	(Serbia) Novak Djokovic; 7–6^{(7–4)}, 6–2	(France) Jo-Wilfried Tsonga	(Germany) Florian Mayer (Spain) Feliciano López	(Austria) Jürgen Melzer (China) Zhang Ze (Russia) Mikhail Youzhny (United States) Sam Querrey
1 Oct	China Open; Beijing, China; ATP World Tour 500; Hard – $2,205,000 – 32S/16D; Singles – Doubles	(United States) Bob Bryan (United States) Mike Bryan; 6–3, 6–2	(Argentina) Carlos Berlocq (Uzbekistan) Denis Istomin	(Germany) Florian Mayer (Spain) Feliciano López	(Austria) Jürgen Melzer (China) Zhang Ze (Russia) Mikhail Youzhny (United States) Sam Querrey
1 Oct	Rakuten Japan Open Tennis Championships; Tokyo, Japan; ATP World Tour 500; Hard – $1,280,565 – 32S/16D; Singles – Doubles	(Japan) Kei Nishikori; 7–6^{(7–5)}, 3–6, 6–0	(Canada) Milos Raonic	(United Kingdom) Andy Murray (Cyprus) Marcos Baghdatis	(Switzerland) Stanislas Wawrinka (Serbia) Janko Tipsarević (Russia) Dmitry Tursunov (Czech Republic) Tomáš Berdych
1 Oct	Rakuten Japan Open Tennis Championships; Tokyo, Japan; ATP World Tour 500; Hard – $1,280,565 – 32S/16D; Singles – Doubles	(Austria) Alexander Peya (Brazil) Bruno Soares; 6–3, 7–6^{(7–5)}	(India) Leander Paes (Czech Republic) Radek Štěpánek	(United Kingdom) Andy Murray (Cyprus) Marcos Baghdatis	(Switzerland) Stanislas Wawrinka (Serbia) Janko Tipsarević (Russia) Dmitry Tursunov (Czech Republic) Tomáš Berdych
8 Oct	Shanghai Rolex Masters; Shanghai, China; ATP World Tour Masters 1000; Hard – $3,531,600 – 56S/28Q/24D; Singles – Doubles	(Serbia) Novak Djokovic; 5–7, 7–6^{(13–11)}, 6–3	(United Kingdom) Andy Murray	(Switzerland) Roger Federer (Czech Republic) Tomáš Berdych	(Croatia) Marin Čilić (Czech Republic) Radek Štěpánek (France) Jo-Wilfried Tsonga (Germany) Tommy Haas
8 Oct	Shanghai Rolex Masters; Shanghai, China; ATP World Tour Masters 1000; Hard – $3,531,600 – 56S/28Q/24D; Singles – Doubles	(India) Leander Paes (Czech Republic) Radek Štěpánek; 6–7^{(7–9)}, 6–3, [10–5]	(India) Mahesh Bhupathi (India) Rohan Bopanna	(Switzerland) Roger Federer (Czech Republic) Tomáš Berdych	(Croatia) Marin Čilić (Czech Republic) Radek Štěpánek (France) Jo-Wilfried Tsonga (Germany) Tommy Haas
15 Oct	Kremlin Cup; Moscow, Russia; ATP World Tour 250; Hard (i) – $673,150 – 28S/16D; Singles – Doubles	(Italy) Andreas Seppi; 3–6, 7–6^{(7–3)}, 6–3	(Brazil) Thomaz Bellucci	(Croatia) Ivo Karlović (Tunisia) Malek Jaziri	(France) Édouard Roger-Vasselin (Poland) Jerzy Janowicz (Czech Republic) Lukáš Rosol (Japan) Tatsuma Ito
15 Oct	Kremlin Cup; Moscow, Russia; ATP World Tour 250; Hard (i) – $673,150 – 28S/16D; Singles – Doubles	(Czech Republic) František Čermák (Slovakia) Michal Mertiňák; 7–5, 6–3	(Italy) Simone Bolelli (Italy) Daniele Bracciali	(Croatia) Ivo Karlović (Tunisia) Malek Jaziri	(France) Édouard Roger-Vasselin (Poland) Jerzy Janowicz (Czech Republic) Lukáš Rosol (Japan) Tatsuma Ito
15 Oct	If Stockholm Open; Stockholm, Sweden; ATP World Tour 250; Hard (i) – €486,750 – 28S/16D; Singles – Doubles	(Czech Republic) Tomáš Berdych; 4–6, 6–4, 6–4	(France) Jo-Wilfried Tsonga	(Cyprus) Marcos Baghdatis (Spain) Nicolás Almagro	(Ukraine) Sergiy Stakhovsky (Lithuania) Ričardas Berankis (Australia) Lleyton Hewitt (Russia) Mikhail Youzhny
15 Oct	If Stockholm Open; Stockholm, Sweden; ATP World Tour 250; Hard (i) – €486,750 – 28S/16D; Singles – Doubles	(Brazil) Marcelo Melo (Brazil) Bruno Soares; 6–7^{(7–4)}, 6–4, [10–6]	(Sweden) Robert Lindstedt (Serbia) Nenad Zimonjić	(Cyprus) Marcos Baghdatis (Spain) Nicolás Almagro	(Ukraine) Sergiy Stakhovsky (Lithuania) Ričardas Berankis (Australia) Lleyton Hewitt (Russia) Mikhail Youzhny
15 Oct	Erste Bank Open; Vienna, Austria; ATP World Tour 250; Hard (i) – €486,750 – 28S/16D; Singles – Doubles	(Argentina) Juan Martín del Potro; 7–5, 6–3	(Slovenia) Grega Žemlja	(Luxembourg) Gilles Müller (Serbia) Janko Tipsarević	(Australia) Marinko Matosevic (Italy) Paolo Lorenzi (Germany) Tommy Haas (Slovenia) Aljaž Bedene
15 Oct	Erste Bank Open; Vienna, Austria; ATP World Tour 250; Hard (i) – €486,750 – 28S/16D; Singles – Doubles	(Germany) Andre Begemann (Germany) Martin Emmrich; 6–4, 3–6, [10–4]	(Austria) Julian Knowle (Slovakia) Filip Polášek	(Luxembourg) Gilles Müller (Serbia) Janko Tipsarević	(Australia) Marinko Matosevic (Italy) Paolo Lorenzi (Germany) Tommy Haas (Slovenia) Aljaž Bedene
22 Oct	Valencia Open 500; Valencia, Spain; ATP World Tour 500; Hard (i) – €1,424,850 – 32S/16D; Singles – Doubles	(Spain) David Ferrer; 6–1, 3–6, 6–4	(Ukraine) Alexandr Dolgopolov	(Croatia) Ivan Dodig (Austria) Jürgen Melzer	(Spain) Nicolás Almagro (Croatia) Marin Čilić (Spain) Marcel Granollers (Belgium) David Goffin
22 Oct	Valencia Open 500; Valencia, Spain; ATP World Tour 500; Hard (i) – €1,424,850 – 32S/16D; Singles – Doubles	(Austria) Alexander Peya (Brazil) Bruno Soares; 6–3, 6–2	(Spain) David Marrero (Spain) Fernando Verdasco	(Croatia) Ivan Dodig (Austria) Jürgen Melzer	(Spain) Nicolás Almagro (Croatia) Marin Čilić (Spain) Marcel Granollers (Belgium) David Goffin
22 Oct	Swiss Indoors Basel; Basel, Switzerland; ATP World Tour 500; Hard (i) – €1,404,300 – 32S/16D; Singles – Doubles	(Argentina) Juan Martín del Potro; 6–4, 6–7^{(5–7)}, 7–6^{(7–3)}	(Switzerland) Roger Federer	(France) Paul-Henri Mathieu (France) Richard Gasquet	(France) Benoît Paire (Bulgaria) Grigor Dimitrov (Russia) Mikhail Youzhny (South Africa) Kevin Anderson
22 Oct	Swiss Indoors Basel; Basel, Switzerland; ATP World Tour 500; Hard (i) – €1,404,300 – 32S/16D; Singles – Doubles	(Canada) Daniel Nestor (Serbia) Nenad Zimonjić; 7–5, 6–7^{(4–7)}, [10–5]	(Philippines) Treat Conrad Huey (United Kingdom) Dominic Inglot	(France) Paul-Henri Mathieu (France) Richard Gasquet	(France) Benoît Paire (Bulgaria) Grigor Dimitrov (Russia) Mikhail Youzhny (South Africa) Kevin Anderson
29 Oct	BNP Paribas Masters; Paris, France; ATP World Tour Masters 1000; Hard (i) – €2,427,975 – 48S/24D; Singles – Doubles	(Spain) David Ferrer; 6–4, 6–3	(Poland) Jerzy Janowicz	(France) Gilles Simon (France) Michaël Llodra	(Czech Republic) Tomáš Berdych (Serbia) Janko Tipsarević (France) Jo-Wilfried Tsonga (United States) Sam Querrey
29 Oct	BNP Paribas Masters; Paris, France; ATP World Tour Masters 1000; Hard (i) – €2,427,975 – 48S/24D; Singles – Doubles	(India) Mahesh Bhupathi (India) Rohan Bopanna; 7–6^{(8–6)}, 6–3	(Pakistan) Aisam-ul-Haq Qureshi (Netherlands) Jean-Julien Rojer	(France) Gilles Simon (France) Michaël Llodra	(Czech Republic) Tomáš Berdych (Serbia) Janko Tipsarević (France) Jo-Wilfried Tsonga (United States) Sam Querrey

=== November ===
Week	Tournament	Champions	Runners-up	Semifinalists	Quarterfinalists
5 Nov	Barclays ATP World Tour Finals; London, United Kingdom; ATP World Tour Finals; Hard (i) – £5,500,000 – 8S/8D (RR); Singles – Doubles	(Serbia) Novak Djokovic; 7–6^{(8–6)}, 7–5	(Switzerland) Roger Federer	(Argentina) Juan Martín del Potro (United Kingdom) Andy Murray	Round Robin losers (Czech Republic) Tomáš Berdych (France) Jo-Wilfried Tsonga (Spain) David Ferrer (Serbia) Janko Tipsarević
5 Nov	Barclays ATP World Tour Finals; London, United Kingdom; ATP World Tour Finals; Hard (i) – £5,500,000 – 8S/8D (RR); Singles – Doubles	(Spain) Marcel Granollers (Spain) Marc López; 7–5, 3–6, [10–3]	(India) Mahesh Bhupathi (India) Rohan Bopanna	(Argentina) Juan Martín del Potro (United Kingdom) Andy Murray	Round Robin losers (Czech Republic) Tomáš Berdych (France) Jo-Wilfried Tsonga (Spain) David Ferrer (Serbia) Janko Tipsarević
12 Nov	Davis Cup by BNP Paribas Final; Prague, Czech Republic – hard (i)	Czech Republic; 3–2	Spain		

== Statistical information ==
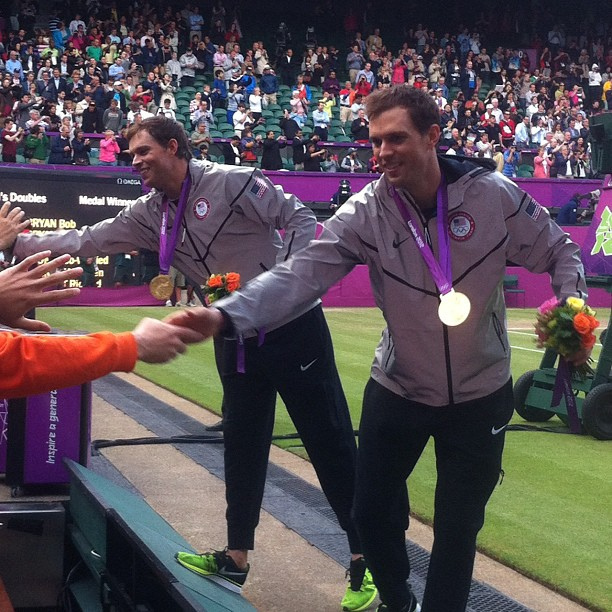
Bob and Mike Bryan won seven titles together in 2012, including the Olympic gold (def. Llodra/Tsonga), and their fourth US Open (def. Paes/Štěpánek), tying John Newcombe and Tony Roche's all-time record of 12 Grand Slam wins.

These tables present the number of singles (S), doubles (D), and mixed doubles (X) titles won by each player and each nation during the season, within all the tournament categories of the 2012 ATP World Tour: the Grand Slam tournaments, the tennis event at the London Summer Olympic Games, the ATP World Tour Finals, the ATP World Tour Masters 1000, the ATP World Tour 500 series, and the ATP World Tour 250 series. The players/nations are sorted by: 1) total number of titles (a doubles title won by two players representing the same nation counts as only one win for the nation); 2) cumulated importance of those titles (one Grand Slam win equalling two Masters 1000 wins, one ATP World Tour Finals win equalling one-and-a-half Masters 1000 win, one Masters 1000 win equalling two 500 events wins, one Olympic win equalling one-and-a-half 500 event win, one 500 event win equalling two 250 events wins); 3) a singles > doubles > mixed doubles hierarchy; 4) alphabetical order (by family names for players).

Key

Grand Slam
ATP World Tour Finals
Summer Olympic Games
ATP World Tour Masters 1000
ATP World Tour 500
ATP World Tour 250

=== Titles won by player ===
Total	Player	Grand Slam			Olympic Games			ATP Finals		Masters 1000		Tour 500		Tour 250		Total		
Total	Player	S	D	X	S	D	X	S	D	S	D	S	D	S	D	S	D	X
8	Mike Bryan (USA)		●	●		●					● ●		●		● ●	0	7	1
7	Bob Bryan (USA)		●			●					● ●		●		● ●	0	7	0
7	David Ferrer (ESP)									●		● ●		● ● ● ●		7	0	0
6	Novak Djokovic (SRB)	●						●		● ● ●		●				6	0	0
6	Roger Federer (SUI)	●								● ● ●		● ●				6	0	0
6	Bruno Soares (BRA)			●									● ●		● ● ●	0	5	1
5	Rafael Nadal (ESP)	●								● ●	●	●				4	1	0
5	Max Mirnyi (BLR)		●				●						●		● ●	0	4	1
5	Daniel Nestor (CAN)		●										● ●		● ●	0	5	0
5	Horia Tecău (ROU)			●							●				● ● ●	0	4	1
4	Leander Paes (IND)		●								● ●				●	0	4	0
4	Marc López (ESP)								●		● ●				●	0	4	0
4	Robert Lindstedt (SWE)										●				● ● ●	0	4	0
4	David Marrero (ESP)												● ●		● ●	0	4	0
4	Alexander Peya (AUT)												● ●		● ●	0	4	0
4	Fernando Verdasco (ESP)												● ●		● ●	0	4	0
4	Juan Martín del Potro (ARG)											●		● ● ●		4	0	0
4	Juan Mónaco (ARG)											●		● ● ●		4	0	0
3	Andy Murray (GBR)	●			●									●		3	0	0
3	Radek Štěpánek (CZE)		●								● ●					0	3	0
3	Mahesh Bhupathi (IND)			●							●		●			0	2	1
3	Marcel Granollers (ESP)								●		●				●	0	3	0
3	Nenad Zimonjić (SRB)												● ●		●	0	3	0
3	František Čermák (CZE)														● ● ●	0	3	0
3	Nicolas Mahut (FRA)														● ● ●	0	3	0
3	Édouard Roger-Vasselin (FRA)														● ● ●	0	3	0
2	Rohan Bopanna (IND)										●		●			0	2	0
2	Mariusz Fyrstenberg (POL)										●		●			0	2	0
2	Marcin Matkowski (POL)										●		●			0	2	0
2	Nicolás Almagro (ESP)													● ●		2	0	0
2	Tomáš Berdych (CZE)													● ●		2	0	0
2	Marin Čilić (CRO)													● ●		2	0	0
2	John Isner (USA)													● ●		2	0	0
2	Milos Raonic (CAN)													● ●		2	0	0
2	Andy Roddick (USA)													● ●		2	0	0
2	Andreas Seppi (ITA)													● ●		2	0	0
2	Jo-Wilfried Tsonga (FRA)													● ●		2	0	0
2	Sam Querrey (USA)													●	●	1	1	0
2	Janko Tipsarević (SRB)													●	●	1	1	0
2	Mikhail Youzhny (RUS)													●	●	1	1	0
2	Colin Fleming (GBR)														● ●	0	2	0
2	Santiago González (MEX)														● ●	0	2	0
2	Ross Hutchins (GBR)														● ●	0	2	0
2	Scott Lipsky (USA)														● ●	0	2	0
2	Xavier Malisse (BEL)														● ●	0	2	0
2	Filip Polášek (SVK)														● ●	0	2	0
2	Aisam-ul-Haq Qureshi (PAK)														● ●	0	2	0
2	Jean-Julien Rojer (NED)														● ●	0	2	0
1	Jonathan Marray (GBR)		●													0	1	0
1	Frederik Nielsen (DEN)		●													0	1	0
1	Alexandr Dolgopolov (UKR)											●				1	0	0
1	Jürgen Melzer (AUT)											●				1	0	0
1	Kei Nishikori (JPN)											●				1	0	0
1	Treat Conrad Huey (PHI)												●			0	1	0
1	Dominic Inglot (GBR)												●			0	1	0
1	Michaël Llodra (FRA)												●			0	1	0
1	Kevin Anderson (RSA)													●		1	0	0
1	Pablo Andújar (ESP)													●		1	0	0
1	Thomaz Bellucci (BRA)													●		1	0	0
1	Richard Gasquet (FRA)													●		1	0	0
1	Tommy Haas (GER)													●		1	0	0
1	Robin Haase (NED)													●		1	0	0
1	Martin Kližan (SVK)													●		1	0	0
1	Philipp Kohlschreiber (GER)													●		1	0	0
1	Jarkko Nieminen (FIN)													●		1	0	0
1	Gilles Simon (FRA)													●		1	0	0
1	Marcos Baghdatis (CYP)														●	0	1	0
1	Andre Begemann (GER)														●	0	1	0
1	Ruben Bemelmans (BEL)														●	0	1	0
1	James Blake (USA)														●	0	1	0
1	Dustin Brown (GER)														●	0	1	0
1	Eric Butorac (USA)														●	0	1	0
1	Jérémy Chardy (FRA)														●	0	1	0
1	Matthew Ebden (AUS)														●	0	1	0
1	Martin Emmrich (GER)														●	0	1	0
1	Jonathan Erlich (ISR)														●	0	1	0
1	Frederico Gil (POR)														●	0	1	0
1	Daniel Gimeno Traver (ESP)														●	0	1	0
1	Paul Hanley (AUS)														●	0	1	0
1	Ryan Harrison (USA)														●	0	1	0
1	Julian Knowle (AUT)														●	0	1	0
1	Mark Knowles (BAH)														●	0	1	0
1	Łukasz Kubot (POL)														●	0	1	0
1	Oliver Marach (AUT)														●	0	1	0
1	Marcelo Melo (BRA)														●	0	1	0
1	Michal Mertiňák (SVK)														●	0	1	0
1	Andy Ram (ISR)														●	0	1	0
1	Rajeev Ram (USA)														●	0	1	0
1	Lukáš Rosol (CZE)														●	0	1	0
1	Danai Udomchoke (THA)														●	0	1	0
1	Lu Yen-hsun (TPE)														●	0	1	0

=== Titles won by nation ===
Total	Nation	Grand Slam			Olympic Games			ATP Finals		Masters 1000		Tour 500		Tour 250		Total		
Total	Nation	S	D	X	S	D	X	S	D	S	D	S	D	S	D	S	D	X
23	Spain (ESP)	1							1	3	2	3	2	7	4	14	9	0
19	United States (USA)		1	1		1					2		1	5	8	5	13	1
11	Serbia (SRB)	1						1		3		1	2	1	2	7	4	0
9	France (FRA)												1	4	4	4	5	0
8	Czech Republic (CZE)		1								2			1	4	1	7	0
8	Argentina (ARG)											2		6		8	0	0
7	Great Britain (GBR)	1	1		1								1	1	2	3	4	0
7	India (IND)		1	1							3		1		1	0	6	1
7	Canada (CAN)		1										2	2	2	2	5	0
7	Brazil (BRA)			1									2	1	3	1	5	1
6	Switzerland (SUI)	1								3		2				6	0	0
6	Austria (AUT)											1	2		3	1	5	0
5	Belarus (BLR)		1				1						1		2	0	4	1
5	Romania (ROU)			1							1				3	0	4	1
4	Sweden (SWE)										1				3	0	4	0
4	Germany (GER)													2	2	2	2	0
4	Slovakia (SVK)													1	3	1	3	0
3	Poland (POL)										1		1		1	0	3	0
3	Netherlands (NED)													1	2	1	2	0
2	Croatia (CRO)													2		2	0	0
2	Italy (ITA)													2		2	0	0
2	Russia (RUS)													1	1	1	1	0
2	Australia (AUS)														2	0	2	0
2	Belgium (BEL)														2	0	2	0
2	Mexico (MEX)														2	0	2	0
2	Pakistan (PAK)														2	0	2	0
1	Denmark (DEN)		1													0	1	0
1	Japan (JPN)											1				1	0	0
1	Ukraine (UKR)											1				1	0	0
1	Philippines (PHI)												1			0	1	0
1	Finland (FIN)													1		1	0	0
1	South Africa (RSA)													1		1	0	0
1	Bahamas (BAH)														1	0	1	0
1	Cyprus (CYP)														1	0	1	0
1	Israel (ISR)														1	0	1	0
1	Portugal (POR)														1	0	1	0
1	Thailand (THA)														1	0	1	0
1	Chinese Taipei (TPE)														1	0	1	0

=== Titles information ===
The following players won their first main circuit title in singles, doubles, or mixed doubles:

Singles

- (Slovakia) Martin Kližan – St. Petersburg (singles)

Doubles

- (Czech Republic) Lukáš Rosol – Doha (doubles)
- (Serbia) Janko Tipsarević – Chennai (doubles)
- (France) Édouard Roger-Vasselin – Montpellier (doubles)
- (Cyprus) Marcos Baghdatis – Zagreb (doubles)
- (Portugal) Frederico Gil – Viña del Mar (doubles)
- (Spain) Daniel Gimeno Traver – Viña del Mar (doubles)
- (Denmark) Frederik Nielsen – Wimbledon Championships (doubles)
- (United Kingdom) Jonathan Marray – Wimbledon Championships (doubles)
- (Belgium) Ruben Bemelmans – Los Angeles (doubles)
- (Philippines) Treat Conrad Huey – Washington, D.C. (doubles)
- (United Kingdom) Dominic Inglot – Washington, D.C. (doubles)
- (Thailand) Danai Udomchoke – Bangkok (doubles)
- (Germany) Andre Begemann – Vienna (doubles)
- (Germany) Martin Emmrich – Vienna (doubles)

Mixed doubles

- (Romania) Horia Tecău – Australian Open (mixed doubles)
- (Brazil) Bruno Soares – US Open (mixed doubles)

The following players defended a main circuit title in singles, doubles, or mixed doubles:

- (Spain) David Ferrer – Auckland (singles), Acapulco (singles)
- (India) Leander Paes – Chennai (doubles), Miami (doubles)
- (Serbia) Novak Djokovic – Australian Open (singles), Miami (singles), Toronto (singles)
- (Brazil) Bruno Soares – São Paulo (doubles)
- (Spain) Nicolás Almagro – São Paulo (singles), Nice (singles)
- (Canada) Milos Raonic – San Jose (singles)
- (Belarus) Max Mirnyi – Memphis (doubles), French Open (doubles)
- (Canada) Daniel Nestor – Memphis (doubles), French Open (doubles)
- (Spain) Pablo Andújar – Casablanca (singles)
- (Spain) Rafael Nadal – Monte Carlo (singles), Barcelona (singles), French Open (singles)
- (United States) Bob Bryan – Monte Carlo (doubles)
- (United States) Mike Bryan – Monte Carlo (doubles)
- (Argentina) Juan Martín del Potro – Estoril (singles)
- (Netherlands) Jean-Julien Rojer – Estoril (doubles)
- (Pakistan) Aisam-ul-Haq Qureshi – Halle (doubles)
- (Sweden) Robert Lindstedt – Båstad (doubles)
- (Romania) Horia Tecău – Båstad (doubles)
- (United States) John Isner – Newport (singles), Winston–Salem (singles)
- (Australia) Matthew Ebden – Atlanta (doubles)
- (Netherlands) Robin Haase – Kitzbühel (singles)
- (Belgium) Xavier Malisse – Los Angeles (doubles)
- (France) Jo-Wilfried Tsonga – Metz (singles)
- (Czech Republic) František Čermák – Moscow (doubles)
- (Serbia) Nenad Zimonjić – Basel (doubles)
- (India) Rohan Bopanna – Paris (doubles)

== ATP rankings ==
These are the ATP rankings of the top twenty singles players, doubles players, and the top ten doubles teams on the ATP Tour, at the end of the 2011 ATP World Tour, and at the current date of the 2012 season. Players in gold background have qualified for the Year-End Championships. Rafael Nadal withdrew due to a knee injury.

=== Singles ===
Race to the Finals Singles Rankings
#	Player	Points	Tours
1	Novak Djokovic (SRB)	11,420	17
2	Roger Federer (SUI)	9,465	20
3	Andy Murray (GBR)	7,600	19
4	Rafael Nadal (ESP)	6,795	19
5	David Ferrer (ESP)	6,030	24
6	Tomáš Berdych (CZE)	4,405	23
7	Juan Martín del Potro (ARG)	4,080	22
8	Jo-Wilfried Tsonga (FRA)	3,490	25
9	Janko Tipsarević (SRB)	2,990	27
10	Richard Gasquet (FRA)	2,515	23
11	Nicolás Almagro (ESP)	2,515	27
12	Juan Mónaco (ARG)	2,430	24
13	Milos Raonic (CAN)	2,380	24
14	John Isner (USA)	2,215	26
15	Marin Čilić (CRO)	2,210	23
16	Gilles Simon (FRA)	2,165	27
17	Stan Wawrinka (SUI)	1,900	22
18	Alexandr Dolgopolov (UKR)	1,855	26
19	Kei Nishikori (JPN)	1,830	23
20	Philipp Kohlschreiber (GER)	1,770	27

Year-end rankings 2012 (31 December 2012)
#	Player	Points	#Trn	'11 Rk	High	Low	'11→'12
1	Novak Djokovic (SRB)	12,920	18	1	1	2	Steady
2	Roger Federer (SUI)	10,265	21	3	1	3	▲1
3	Andy Murray (GBR)	8,000	20	4	3	4	▲1
4	Rafael Nadal (ESP)	6,690	18	2	2	4	▼2
5	David Ferrer (ESP)	6,505	25	5	5	6	Steady
6	Tomáš Berdych (CZE)	4,680	24	7	6	7	▲1
7	Juan Martín del Potro (ARG)	4,480	23	11	7	12	▲4
8	Jo-Wilfried Tsonga (FRA)	3,490	26	6	5	8	▼2
9	Janko Tipsarević (SRB)	2,990	28	9	8	10	Steady
10	Richard Gasquet (FRA)	2,515	23	19	10	22	▲9
11	Nicolás Almagro (ESP)	2,515	27	10	10	14	▼1
12	Juan Mónaco (ARG)	2,430	24	26	10	29	▲14
13	Milos Raonic (CAN)	2,380	24	31	13	35	▲18
14	John Isner (USA)	2,215	26	18	9	18	▲4
15	Marin Čilić (CRO)	2,210	23	21	13	25	▲6
16	Gilles Simon (FRA)	2,165	27	12	11	20	▼4
17	Stan Wawrinka (SUI)	1,900	22	17	16	29	Steady
18	Alexandr Dolgopolov (UKR)	1,855	26	15	13	25	▼3
19	Kei Nishikori (JPN)	1,830	23	25	15	26	▲6
20	Philipp Kohlschreiber (GER)	1,770	27	43	16	43	▲23

==== Number 1 ranking ====
Holder	Date gained	Date forfeited
Novak Djokovic (SRB)	Year-End 2011	8 July 2012
Roger Federer (SUI)	9 July 2012	4 November 2012
Novak Djokovic (SRB)	5 November 2012	Year-End 2012

=== Doubles ===
Year-end rankings 2012 (31 December 2012)
#	Team	Points	#Trn	Rank	Change
1	Bob Bryan (USA); Mike Bryan (USA)	9,685	24	1	Steady
2	Max Mirnyi (BLR); Daniel Nestor (CAN)	6,875	22	2	Steady
3	Leander Paes (IND); Radek Štěpánek (CZE)	6,865	14	–	▲NR
4	Robert Lindstedt (SWE); Horia Tecău (ROU)	6,165	25	6	▲2
5	Marcel Granollers (ESP); Marc López (ESP)	5,660	20	29	▲24
6	Mahesh Bhupathi (IND); Rohan Bopanna (IND)	5,255	24	–	▲NR
7	Jean-Julien Rojer (NED); Aisam-ul-Haq Qureshi (PAK)	4,115	26	–	▲NR
8	Mariusz Fyrstenberg (POL); Marcin Matkowski (POL)	3,690	23	8	Steady
9	Jonathan Marray (GBR); Frederik Nielsen (DEN)	2,580	8	–	▲NR
10	Colin Fleming (GBR); Ross Hutchins (GBR)	2,420	25	15	▲5

Year-end rankings 2012 (31 December 2012)
#	Player	Points	#Trn	Rank	High	Low	Change
1	Mike Bryan (USA)	9,620	22	1T	1T	3T	Steady
2	Bob Bryan (USA)	9,550	22	1T	1T	3T	▼1
3	Leander Paes (IND)	7,655	22	8	3	8	▲5
4	Radek Štěpánek (CZE)	7,340	17	109	4	109	▲105
5	Daniel Nestor (CAN)	7,150	24	3T	1T	5	▼2
6	Marc López (ESP)	6,840	22	37	6	42	▲31
7	Max Mirnyi (BLR)	6,830	22	3T	1T	7	▼4
8	Robert Lindstedt (SWE)	6,000	27	16	5	16	▲8
9	Horia Tecău (ROU)	5,940	26	12	5T	13	▲3
10	Marcel Granollers (ESP)	5,790	23	32	10	43	▲22
11	Mahesh Bhupathi (IND)	5,210	24	7	7	18	▼4
12	Rohan Bopanna (IND)	5,210	25	11	8	15	▼1
13	Jean-Julien Rojer (NED)	4,160	32	20	13	38	▲7
14	Aisam-ul-Haq Qureshi (PAK)	4,070	27	9	9	16	▲2
15	Mariusz Fyrstenberg (POL)	3,825	26	14T	6	15	▼1
16	Marcin Matkowski (POL)	3,690	23	14T	7	16	▼2
17	Jonathan Marray (GBR)	3,513	31	86	17	94	▲69
18	Marcelo Melo (BRA)	3,385	29	27	17	36	▲9
19	Bruno Soares (BRA)	3,340	29	19	17	32	Steady
20	Nenad Zimonjić (SRB)	3,200	26	6	6	20	▼14

== Prize money leaders ==
#	Player	Singles	Doubles	Year-to-date
1	Novak Djokovic (SRB)	$9,949,921	$3,816	$9,953,737
2	Roger Federer (SUI)	$7,424,842	$0	$7,424,842
3	Andy Murray (GBR)	$5,100,272	$23,958	$5,124,230
4	Rafael Nadal (ESP)	$4,867,663	$129,785	$4,997,448
5	David Ferrer (ESP)	$4,015,856	$25,484	$4,041,340
6	Juan Martín del Potro (ARG)	$2,769,169	$5,824	$2,775,003
7	Tomáš Berdych (CZE)	$2,555,801	$38,166	$2,593,967
8	Jo-Wilfried Tsonga (FRA)	$2,130,514	$38,126	$2,168,640
9	Janko Tipsarević (SRB)	$1,736,150	$97,587	$1,833,737
10	Richard Gasquet (FRA)	$1,320,368	$37,309	$1,357,677
as of November 12, 2012

== Statistics leaders ==
as of 12 November 2012

Aces
Pos	Player	Aces	Matches
1	(United States) John Isner	1,005	66
2	(Canada) Milos Raonic	1,002	65
3	(United States) Sam Querrey	705	62
4	(Switzerland) Roger Federer	665	83
5	(Spain) Nicolás Almagro	654	80
6	(France) Jo-Wilfried Tsonga	653	80
7	(South Africa) Kevin Anderson	638	56
8	(Czech Republic) Tomáš Berdych	649	82
9	(Serbia) Janko Tipsarević	632	85
10	(Argentina) Juan Martín del Potro	594	82

Service games won
Pos	Player	%	Matches
1	(Canada) Milos Raonic	93	65
2	(United States) John Isner	92	66
3	(Switzerland) Roger Federer	91	78
4	(Spain) Rafael Nadal	88	48
5	(Argentina) Juan Martín del Potro	88	78
6	(Serbia) Novak Djokovic	87	82
7	(Czech Republic) Tomáš Berdych	87	79
8	(France) Jo-Wilfried Tsonga	86	77
9	(Spain) Feliciano López	86	53
10	(Luxembourg) Gilles Müller	86	43

Break points saved
Pos	Player	%	Matches
1	(Canada) Milos Raonic	74	65
2	(United States) John Isner	74	66
3	(Spain) Rafael Nadal	71	48
4	(Czech Republic) Tomáš Berdych	70	79
5	(France) Jo-Wilfried Tsonga	70	77
6	(Spain) Feliciano López	70	53
7	(Switzerland) Roger Federer	69	78
8	(Argentina) Juan Martín del Potro	69	78
9	(France) Jérémy Chardy	69	44
10	(United Kingdom) Andy Murray	67	68

First serve percentage
Pos	Player	%	Matches
1	(Russia) Alex Bogomolov Jr.	71	44
2	(Italy) Flavio Cipolla	70	40
3	(Russia) Nikolay Davydenko	70	47
4	(Spain) Fernando Verdasco	69	54
5	(United States) John Isner	69	66
6	(Argentina) Juan Mónaco	68	58
7	(Finland) Jarkko Nieminen	68	53
8	(Spain) Rafael Nadal	67	48
9	(Australia) Bernard Tomic	66	53
10	(Colombia) Santiago Giraldo	66	42

First service points won
Pos	Player	%	Matches
1	(Canada) Milos Raonic	82	65
2	(Luxembourg) Gilles Müller	81	43
3	(United States) Sam Querrey	80	62
4	(Switzerland) Roger Federer	78	78
5	(United States) John Isner	78	66
6	(Spain) Feliciano López	77	53
7	(Czech Republic) Tomáš Berdych	77	79
8	(Spain) Nicolás Almagro	77	80
9	(France) Jo-Wilfried Tsonga	76	77
10	(Serbia) Janko Tipsarević	76	82

Second serve points won
Pos	Player	%	Matches
1	(Switzerland) Roger Federer	60	78
2	(Spain) Rafael Nadal	57	48
3	(Spain) David Ferrer	57	86
4	(Serbia) Novak Djokovic	57	82
5	(United States) John Isner	57	66
6	(Germany) Philipp Kohlschreiber	56	66
7	(France) Richard Gasquet	56	64
8	(Canada) Milos Raonic	56	65
9	(Spain) Nicolás Almagro	55	80
10	(Serbia) Janko Tipsarević	55	82

Points won returning 1st serve
Pos	Player	%	Matches
1	(Spain) Rafael Nadal	38	48
2	(Serbia) Novak Djokovic	36	82
3	(France) Gilles Simon	34	68
4	(Argentina) Juan Mónaco	34	58
5	(Spain) David Ferrer	34	86
6	(Italy) Flavio Cipolla	34	40
7	(Argentina) Carlos Berlocq	34	56
8	(Japan) Kei Nishikori	33	55
9	(United Kingdom) Andy Murray	33	68
10	(France) Benoît Paire	33	52

Break points converted
Pos	Player	%	Matches
1	(Spain) Rafael Nadal	49	48
2	(Serbia) Novak Djokovic	47	82
3	(Austria) Jürgen Melzer	45	45
4	(Italy) Fabio Fognini	45	46
5	(Italy) Flavio Cipolla	45	40
6	(Spain) David Ferrer	45	86
7	(Russia) Nikolay Davydenko	45	47
8	(Italy) Andreas Seppi	44	65
9	(Germany) Philipp Kohlschreiber	44	66
10	(Switzerland) Stanislas Wawrinka	43	55

Return games won
Pos	Player	%	Matches
1	(Spain) Rafael Nadal	38	48
2	(Serbia) Novak Djokovic	35	82
3	(United Kingdom) Andy Murray	32	68
4	(Spain) David Ferrer	31	86
5	(Argentina) Juan Mónaco	31	58
6	(Japan) Kei Nishikori	31	55
7	(Italy) Flavio Cipolla	30	40
8	(Argentina) Carlos Berlocq	29	56
9	(France) Gilles Simon	29	68
10	(France) Richard Gasquet	27	64

== Best matches by ATPWorldTour.com ==
=== Best 5 Grand Slam / Olympic Matches ===
	Event	Round	Surface	Winner	Opponent	Result
1.	Australian Open	F	Hard	(Serbia) Novak Djokovic	(Spain) Rafael Nadal	5–7, 6-4, 6–2, 6–7^{(5–7)}, 7–5
2.	Australian Open	SF	Hard	(Serbia) Novak Djokovic	(United Kingdom) Andy Murray	6–3, 3–6, 6-7^{(4–7)}, 6-1, 7-5
3.	US Open	F	Hard	(United Kingdom) Andy Murray	(Serbia) Novak Djokovic	7–6^{(12–10)}, 7–5, 2–6, 3-6, 6-2
4.	Summer Olympics	SF	Grass	(Switzerland) Roger Federer	(Argentina) Juan Martin Del Potro	3–6, 7-6^{(7–5)}, 19-17
5.	US Open	QF	Hard	(Spain) David Ferrer	(Serbia) Janko Tipsarevic	6–3, 6–7^{(5–7)}, 2-6, 6–3, 7–6^{(7–4)}

=== Best 5 ATP World Tour matches ===
	Event	Round	Surface	Winner	Opponent	Result
1.	Shanghai Masters	F	Hard	(Serbia) Novak Djokovic	(United Kingdom) Andy Murray	5–7, 7–6^{(13–11)}, 6-3
2.	Aircel Chennai Open	F	Hard	(Canada) Milos Raonic	(Serbia) Janko Tipsarevic	6–7^{(7–4)}, 7–6^{(7–4)}, 7–6^{(7–4)}
3.	ATP Finals	F	Hard (i)	(Serbia) Novak Djokovic	(Switzerland) Roger Federer	7–6^{(8–6)}, 7–5
4.	Swiss Indoors	F	Hard (i)	(Argentina) Juan Martin Del Potro	(Switzerland) Roger Federer	6-4, 6–7^{(5–7)}, 7–6^{(7–3)}
5.	Indian Wells Masters	SF	Hard	(United States) John Isner	(Serbia) Novak Djokovic	7–6^{(9–7)}, 3–6, 7–6^{(7–5)}

== Points distribution ==
Category	W	F	SF	QF	R16	R32	R64	R128	Q	Q3	Q2	Q1
Grand Slam (128S)	2000	1200	720	360	180	90	45	10	25	16	8	0
Grand Slam (64D)	2000	1200	720	360	180	90	0	–	25	–	0	0
ATP World Tour Finals (8S/8D)	1500 (max) 1100 (min)	1000 (max) 600 (min)	600 (max) 200 (min)	200 for each round robin match win, +400 for a semifinal win, +500 for the final win.								
ATP World Tour Masters 1000 (96S)	1000	600	360	180	90	45	25	10	16	–	8	0
ATP World Tour Masters 1000 (56S/48S)	1000	600	360	180	90	45	10	–	25	–	16	0
ATP World Tour Masters 1000 (32D/24D)	1000	600	360	180	90	0	–	–	–	–	–	–
Summer Olympic Games (64S)	750	450	340 (bronze) 270 (4th)	135	70	35	5	–	–	–	–	–
ATP World Tour 500 (56S)	500	300	180	90	45	20	0	–	10	–	4	0
ATP World Tour 500 (32S)	500	300	180	90	45	0	–	–	20	–	10	0
ATP World Tour 500 (24D)	500	300	180	90	45	0	–	–	–	–	–	–
ATP World Tour 500 (16D)	500	300	180	90	0	–	–	–	–	–	–	–
ATP World Tour 250 (56S/48S)	250	150	90	45	20	10	0	–	5	3	0	0
ATP World Tour 250 (32S/28S)	250	150	90	45	20	0	–	–	12	6	0	0
ATP World Tour 250 (24D)	250	150	90	45	20	0	–	–	–	–	–	–
ATP World Tour 250 (16D)	250	150	90	45	0	–	–	–	–	–	–	–

Davis Cup
Rubber category		Match win	Match loss	Team bonus	Performance bonus	Total achievable
Singles	Play-offs	5 / 10^{1}				15
Singles	First round	40	10^{2}			80
Singles	Quarterfinals	65				130
Singles	Semifinals	70				140
Singles	Final	75		75^{3}	125^{4}	150 / 225^{3} / 275^{4}
Singles	Cumulative total	500		500 to 535^{3}	625^{4}	625^{4}
Doubles	Play-offs	10				10
Doubles	First round	50	10^{2}			50
Doubles	Quarterfinals	80				80
Doubles	Semifinals	90				90
Doubles	Final	95		35^{5}		95 / 130^{5}
Doubles	Cumulative total	315		350^{5}		350^{5}

The Davis Cup World Group and World Group Play-Off matches awarded ATP Ranking points from 2009 to 2015.

Glossary

Only live matches earn points; dead rubbers earn no points. If a player does not compete in the singles of one or more rounds he will receive points from the previous round when playing singles at the next tie. This last rule also applies for playing in doubles matches.

^{1} A player who wins a singles rubber in the first day of the tie is awarded 5 points, whereas a singles rubber win in tie's last day grants 10 points for a total of 15 available points.

^{2} For the first round only, any player who competes in a live rubber, without a win, receives 10 ranking points for participation.

^{3} Team bonus awarded to a singles player who wins 7 live matches in a calendar year and his team wins the competition.

^{4} Performance bonus awarded to a singles player who wins 8 live matches in a calendar year. In this case, no Team bonus is awarded.

^{5} Team bonus awarded to an unchanged doubles team who wins 4 matches in a calendar year and his team wins the competition.

World Team Cup
Match type	1st round	2nd round	3rd round	Finals	Points	Bonus	Total
Singles 1	35	35	35	95	200	50	250
Singles 2	25	25	25	50	125	50	175
Deciding match (doubles)	35	35	35	95	200	50	250
Dead rubber (doubles)	10	10	10	20	50		50

- Players who only play the finals will be awarded points from the previous round.
- Players must win all 4 matches and be part of the winning team in order to earn the Bonus Points.

== Retirements ==
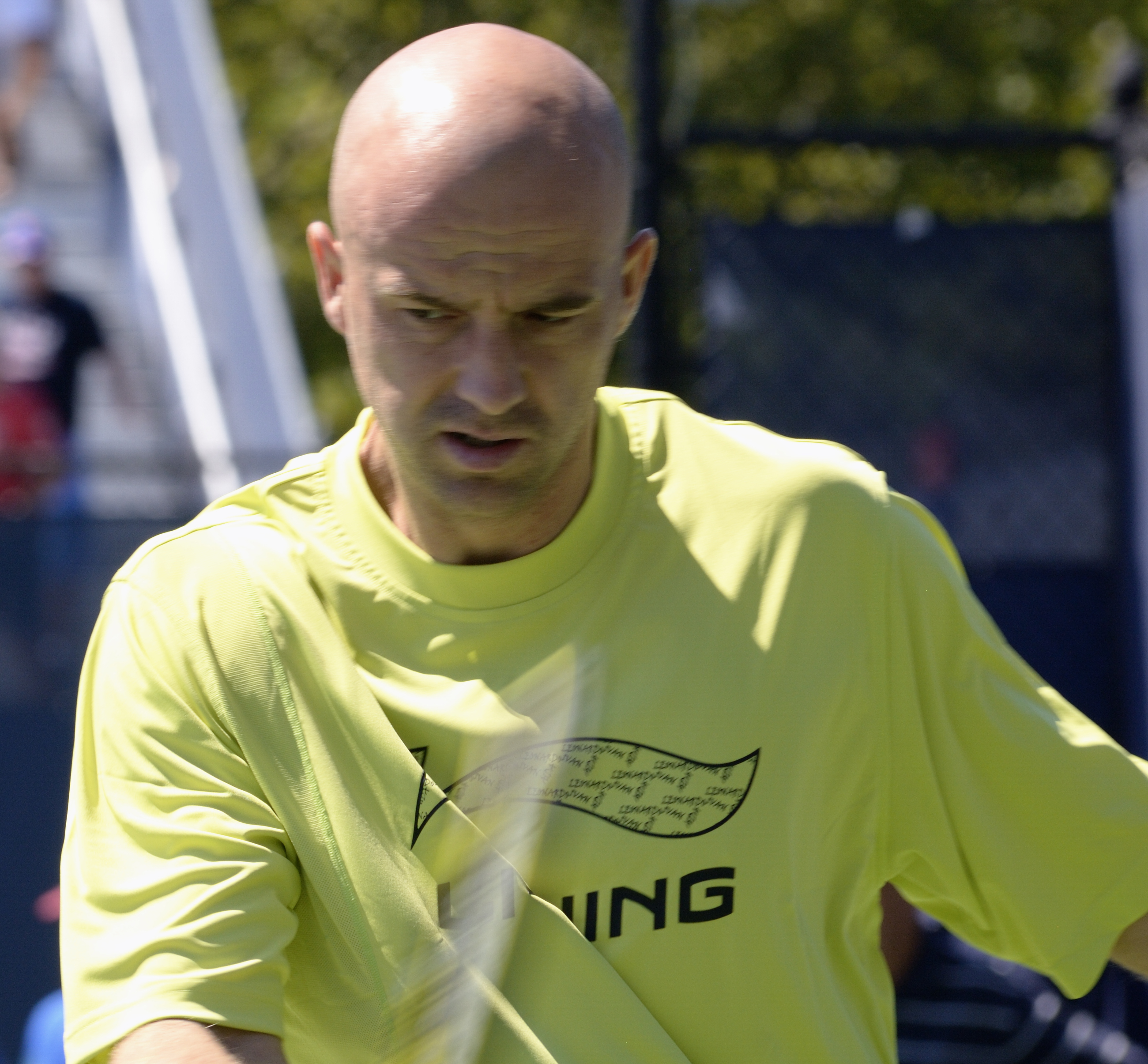
Former world no. 3 Ivan Ljubičić played for the last time at the Monte Carlo Masters.

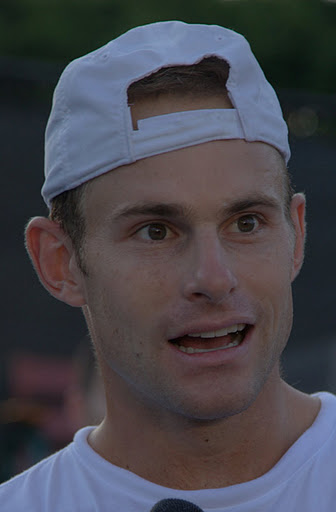
Andy Roddick was the year-end world no. 1 at the end of the 2003 season.

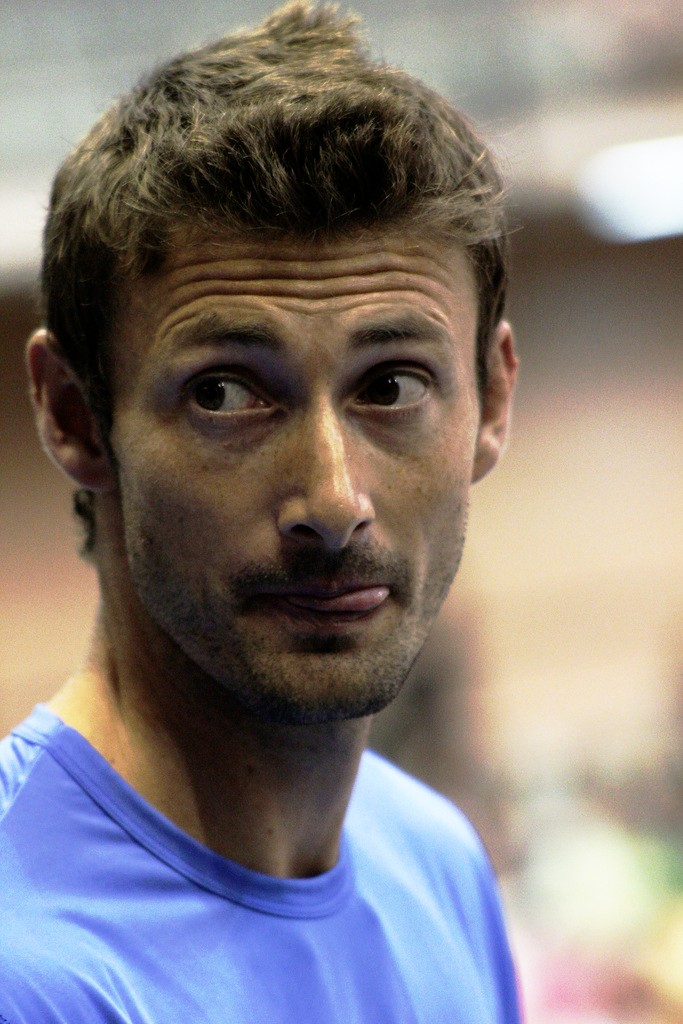
2003 French Open champion Juan Carlos Ferrero is one of two Grand Slam champions to retire in 2012.

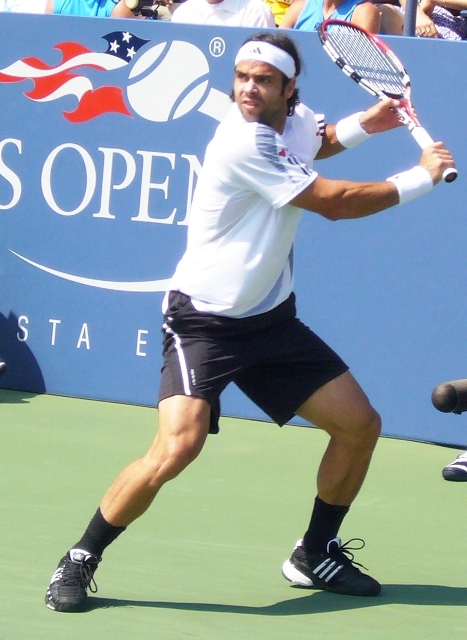
Fernando González former world no. 5 and 2007 Australian Open finalist.

Following is a list of notable players (winners of a main tour title, and/or part of the ATP rankings top 100 (singles) or top 50 (doubles) for at least one week) who announced their retirement from professional tennis, became inactive (after not playing for more than 52 weeks), or were permanently banned from playing, during the 2012 season:

- José Acasuso (born 20 October 1982 in Posadas, Argentina) turned professional in 1999, reaching career-high rankings of singles no. 20 and doubles no. 27, both in 2006. Mainly a clay-court specialist, the Argentine took three singles and five doubles career titles, all on the surface. Playing for Argentina, Acasuso competed in two Davis Cup finals (2006, 2008), and won one World Team Cup title in 2007. Acasuso announced his retirement in February. He played his last match during the French Open qualifying in May 2011.
- Juan Pablo Brzezicki (born 12 April 1982 in Buenos Aires, Argentina) joined the tour in 2001, reaching a career-high ranking of singles no. 94 in 2008. Winner of one doubles titles on the main circuit, Brzezicki competed for the last time in Buenos Aires in February.
- Juan Ignacio Chela (born 30 August 1979 in Ciudad Evita, Argentina) turned professional in 1998, reaching career-high rankings of singles no. 15 in 2004, and doubles no. 34 in 2004. Chela won six singles and three doubles titles during his career on the main circuit, his best Grand Slam results coming with two quarterfinals at the French Open (2004 and 2011) and one quarterfinal at the US Open (2007). At Wimbledon in 2010), he reached the semifinals of the doubles with countryman Eduardo Schwank, losing to Robert Lindstedt and Horia Tecău. Chela last played at the Wimbledon Championships in July, before announcing his retirement in December.
- Arnaud Clément (born 17 December 1977 in Aix-en-Provence, France) became a tennis professional in 1996, peaking as singles no. 10 in 2001, and doubles no. 8 in 2008. In singles, Clément won four titles, made the quarterfinals at all majors but one (the French Open), and reached one Grand Slam final at the Australian Open (2001, losing to Agassi). In doubles, he collected 12 titles and made two major finals with Michaël Llodra, winning one at Wimbledon (2007), and losing the other in Australia (2008). The Frenchman played his last event on the tour in the Wimbledon doubles in July.
- Brian Dabul (born February 24, 1984, in Buenos Aires, Argentina) turned professional in 2001 and reached a career-high ranking of no. 86. His highest doubles ranking was no. 88. He won only one ATP titles in doubles in Viña de Mar in 2009, partnering Pablo Cuevas. He played his last singles match in Guayaquil on 21 November 2011.
- Juan Carlos Ferrero (born 12 February 1980 in Ontinyent, Spain) joined the main circuit in 1998, and reached the world no. 1 ranking in singles on September 8, 2003, holding the spot for a single spell of eight weeks, and finishing three straight seasons in the top 10 (2001–03). Ferrero won 16 singles titles during his 14-year career, including four Masters events, and one Grand Slam trophy at the French Open (2003, def Verkerk). A one-time semifinalist at the Australian Open (2004) and two-time quarterfinalist at Wimbledon (2007, 2009), the Spaniard also made two additional major finals at the French (2002, lost to Costa) and the US Open (2003, lost to Roddick), and reached one year-end championships final (2002, lost to Hewitt). As part of his country's team, Ferrero took part in three victorious Davis Cup campaigns (2000, 2004, 2009). The Spaniard retired after playing in Valencia in October.
- (Chile) Fernando González (born 29 July 1980 in Santiago, Chile) joined the main tour in 1999 and reached his best singles ranking, no. 5, in early 2007, finishing two seasons in the top 10 (2006–07). A junior world no. 1, winner of the boys' doubles at the US Open in 1997 and the boys' singles and doubles at the French Open in 1998, González won 11 singles and 3 doubles titles on the pro circuit, and gathered three medals at the Olympics: the bronze in singles and the gold in doubles (w/ Nicolás Massú, def. Kiefer/Schüttler) in 2004, and the silver in singles (lost the final to Nadal) in 2008. The Chilean reached the last eight at every major, making three quarterfinals at Wimbledon (2005) and the US Open (2002, 2009), one semifinal at the French (2009), and one final at the Australian Open (2007, lost to Federer). Struggling with injuries for more than a year before deciding to retire, González played his last event in Miami in March.
- Mark Knowles (born 4 September 1971 in Nassau, The Bahamas) joined the pro tour in 1992, reached the singles no. 96 spot in 1996, and the doubles world no. 1 ranking in June 2002, keeping the spot for a total of 65 weeks between 2002 and 2005, and finishing two seasons (2002, 2004) as no. 1. Partnering Daniel Nestor for most of his career, and later Mahesh Bhupathi, Knowles won 55 doubles titles, including one year-end championship (2007), and three Grand Slam trophies (all w/ Nestor) out of 13 finals (one Australian Open (2002), one French Open (2007), and one US Open (2004)). Knowles also claimed one mixed doubles win at Wimbledon (2009, w/ Grönefeld). He retired after competing in the US Open doubles in August.
- (Croatia) Ivan Ljubičić (born 19 March 1979 in Banja Luka, SFR Yugoslavia, now Bosnia and Herzegovina) turned professional in 1998, peaking at no. 3 in singles in 2006, ending two seasons in the top 10 (2005–06). During his career Ljubičić won 10 singles titles, including one Masters at Indian Wells (2010), and went past the fourth round twice in Grand Slam tournaments, reaching one quarterfinal at the Australian Open (2006) and one semifinal at the French Open (2006). Playing for his country, the Croat partnered Mario Ančić to a bronze medal in doubles at the 2004 Athens Olympics and took part in one successful Davis Cup campaign (2005). Ljubičić played his last tournament in Monte Carlo in April.
- Peter Luczak (born 31 August 1979 in Warsaw, Poland, moved to Australia in 1980) joined the main circuit in 2000, peaking at no. 64 in singles in 2009. Competing mainly on the ITF Men's Circuit and the ATP Challenger Tour during his career, Luczak's best result came with a gold medal in doubles (w/ Hanley) at the 2010 New Delhi Commonwealth Games. The Australian retired from the sport after losing in the second round of the Australian Open doubles in January.
- (Philippines) Cecil Mamiit (born June 27, 1976, in Los Angeles, California) turned professional in 1996 and reached a career-high ranking of no. 72 in singles. He played his last match in March in USA F7 Futures tournament.
- Andy Roddick (born 30 August 1982 in Omaha, United States) turned professional in 2000 and became the sixth American player to be ranked world no. 1 in singles when he reached the top spot on November 3, 2003, holding it for a single spell of 13 straight weeks. Roddick finished nine seasons in the ATP rankings singles top 10 (2002–10), including one year as no. 1 (2003), and also reached the no. 50 ranking in doubles in 2010. As a junior, the American took two singles Grand Slam titles at the Australian Open and the US Open in 2000, finishing the season as junior world no. 1. Over his 12-year pro career, Roddick collected 32 singles titles, on every surface, among which five Masters and one Grand Slam title, at the US Open (2003, def. Ferrero). Roddick's other best results in majors came with four semifinals at the Australian Open (2003, 2005, 2007, 2009), three finals at Wimbledon (2004, 2005, 2009, all lost to Federer), and another final at the US Open (2006, lost to Federer). In doubles, Roddick won four titles including one Masters trophy. Part of the United States Davis Cup roster for 25 ties over 10 years, Roddick helped the team to a final in 2004, and a title (the country's 32nd) in 2007. The American retired in September, after losing in the fourth round of the US Open.
- Rainer Schüttler (born 25 April 1976 in Korbach, West Germany, now Germany) turned professional in 1995, reaching career-high rankings of singles no. 5 in 2004, and doubles no. 40 in 2005. Schüttler won four singles and four doubles titles during his stint on the main circuit, his best Grand Slam results coming with a final at the Australian Open (2003, lost to Agassi), and a semifinal run at Wimbledon (2008). Alongside countryman Nicolas Kiefer, the German also took the silver medal in doubles at the 2004 Athens Olympics, losing the final in five sets (to González/Massú). Schüttler last played at the Australian Open in January.
- Alexander Waske (born March 31, 1975, in Frankfurt, West Germany) turned professional in 2000 and reached a career-high ranking of no. 89 in singles and no. 16 in doubles. He won four ATP doubles titles and played his last doubles match on 15 October 2012 in Vienna, partnering Janko Tipsarević.

== See also ==
- 2012 WTA Tour
- 2012 ATP Challenger Tour
- 2012 ITF Women's Circuit
- 2012 ITF Men's Circuit
- Association of Tennis Professionals
- International Tennis Federation
