= 2012 International German Open =

- Date: 16–22 July
- Edition: 106th
- Category: ATP World Tour 500
- Draw: 32S / 16D
- Prize money: €900,000
- Surface: Clay / outdoor
- Location: Hamburg, Germany

Champions

Singles
- (Argentina) Juan Mónaco

Doubles
- (Spain) David Marrero / (Spain) Fernando Verdasco
- International German Open

The 2012 International German Open (also known as the bet–at–home Open – German Tennis Championships 2012 for sponsorship reasons) was a men's tennis tournament played on outdoor red clay courts. It was the 106th edition of the event known that year as the International German Open and was part of the ATP World Tour 500 series of the 2012 ATP World Tour. It took place at the Am Rothenbaum in Hamburg, Germany, from 16 July through 22 July 2012. Third-seeded Juan Mónaco won the singles title.

== Finals ==
=== Singles ===
(Argentina) Juan Mónaco defeated (Germany) Tommy Haas, 7–5, 6–4

=== Doubles ===
(Spain) David Marrero / (Spain) Fernando Verdasco defeated (Brazil) Rogerio Dutra da Silva / (Spain) Daniel Muñoz de la Nava, 6–4, 6–3

== Singles main draw entrants ==
=== Seeds ===
Country	Player	Rank^{1}	Seed
ESP	Nicolás Almagro	10	1
FRA	Gilles Simon	12	2
ARG	Juan Mónaco	14	3
CRO	Marin Čilić	15	4
ESP	Fernando Verdasco	16	5
GER	Philipp Kohlschreiber	21	6
GER	Florian Mayer	22	7
SRB	Viktor Troicki	31	8

- ^{1} Rankings are as of July 9, 2012

=== Other entrants ===
The following players received wildcards into the singles main draw:

- (Germany) Matthias Bachinger
- (Germany) Tommy Haas
- (Germany) Julian Reister

The following players received entry from the qualifying draw:

- (Argentina) Federico Delbonis
- (Turkey) Marsel İlhan
- (Spain) Daniel Muñoz de la Nava
- (Argentina) Horacio Zeballos

== Doubles main draw entrants ==
=== Seeds ===
Country	Player	Country	Player	Rank^{1}	Seed
IND	Mahesh Bhupathi	IND	Rohan Bopanna	29	1
AUT	Alexander Peya	SRB	Nenad Zimonjić	41	2
~~ITA~~	~~Daniele Bracciali~~	~~AUT~~	~~Oliver Marach~~	~~48~~	~~3~~
ISR	Jonathan Erlich	ISR	Andy Ram	87	4

- Rankings are as of July 9, 2012

=== Other entrants ===
The following pairs received wildcards into the doubles main draw:

- (Germany) Robin Kern / (Germany) Kevin Krawietz
- (Germany) Tobias Kamke / (Germany) Julian Reister

The following pair received entry as alternates:

- (Brazil) Rogério Dutra da Silva / (Spain) Daniel Muñoz de la Nava

=== Withdrawals ===
- (Austria) Oliver Marach (ankle injury)
