= 2012 Barcelona Open Banco Sabadell – Doubles =

Doubles
- 2012 Barcelona Open Banco Sabadell

Final
- Champions: (Poland) Mariusz Fyrstenberg (Poland) Marcin Matkowski
- Runners-up: (Spain) Marcel Granollers (Spain) Marc López
- Score: 2–6, 7–6^{(9–7)}, [10–8]

Events
Singles	Doubles
← 2011 ·	Barcelona Open Banco Sabadell	· 2013 →

Santiago González and Scott Lipsky were the defending champions but decided not to participate together.
González partnered up with Christopher Kas but lost in the Quarterfinals, while Lipsky played alongside Rajeev Ram but lost in the first round.
Mariusz Fyrstenberg and Marcin Matkowski won the tournament defeating Marcel Granollers and Marc López in the final.

== Seeds ==
1. (United States) Bob Bryan / (United States) Mike Bryan (quarterfinals, withdrew due to Bob Bryan's virus)
2. (Belarus) Max Mirnyi / (Canada) Daniel Nestor (semifinals)
3. (India) Mahesh Bhupati / (Serbia) Nenad Zimonjić (quarterfinals)
4. (Poland) Mariusz Fyrstenberg / (Poland) Marcin Matkowski (champion)
5. (Czech Republic) František Čermák / (Slovakia) Filip Polášek (second round)
6. (Mexico) Santiago González / (Germany) Christopher Kas (quarterfinals)
7. (Pakistan) Aisam-ul-Haq Qureshi / (Netherlands) Jean-Julien Rojer (quarterfinals)
8. (Austria) Oliver Marach / (Austria) Alexander Peya (semifinals)

== Draw ==
=== Key ===
- Q = Qualifier
- WC = Wild card
- LL = Lucky loser
- Alt = Alternate
- SE = Special exempt
- PR = Protected ranking
- ITF = ITF entry
- JE = Junior exempt
- w/o = Walkover
- r = Retired
- d = Defaulted
- SR = Special ranking

=== Finals ===
Semifinals
8	(Austria) Oliver Marach (Austria) Alexander Peya	6^{4}	1
(Spain) Marcel Granollers (Spain) Marc López	7^{7}	6
4	(Poland) Mariusz Fyrstenberg (Poland) Marcin Matkowski	6	0	[10]
2	(Belarus) Max Mirnyi (Canada) Daniel Nestor	3	6	[6]

Final
(Spain) Marcel Granollers (Spain) Marc López	6	6^{7}	[8]
4	(Poland) Mariusz Fyrstenberg (Poland) Marcin Matkowski	2	7^{9}	[10]

=== Top half ===
First round
(Spain) P Andújar (Spain) G García-López	6^{1}	1
(Spain) D Marrero (Spain) F Verdasco	7^{7}	6
(Russia) M Elgin (Uzbekistan) D Istomin	6^{5}	6	[10]
WC	(Spain) I Cervantes Huegun (Spain) G Granollers	7^{7}	3	[8]
(Spain) R Ramírez Hidalgo (Argentina) E Schwank	6^{5}	6^{4}
(Israel) J Erlich (Israel) A Ram	7^{7}	7^{7}
(Colombia) A Falla (Colombia) S Giraldo	6^{2}	4
(Spain) M Granollers (Spain) M López	7^{7}	6

Second round
1	(United States) B Bryan (United States) M Bryan	5	6	[10]
(Spain) D Marrero (Spain) F Verdasco	7	2	[7]
(Russia) M Elgin (Uzbekistan) D Istomin	1	6	[7]
8	(Austria) O Marach (Austria) A Peya	6	4	[10]
3	(India) M Bhupathi (Serbia) N Zimonjić	7^{7}	4	[10]
(Israel) J Erlich (Israel) A Ram	6^{4}	6	[6]
(Spain) M Granollers (Spain) M López	7^{7}	6
5	(Czech Republic) F Čermák (Slovakia) F Polášek	6^{4}	3

Quarterfinals
1	(United States) B Bryan (United States) M Bryan
8	(Austria) O Marach (Austria) A Peya	w/o
3	(India) M Bhupathi (Serbia) N Zimonjić	5	6	[5]
(Spain) M Granollers (Spain) M López	7	3	[10]

Semifinals
8	(Austria) O Marach (Austria) A Peya	6^{4}	1
(Spain) M Granollers (Spain) M López	7^{7}	6

=== Bottom half ===
First round
(United Kingdom) A Murray (United Kingdom) J Murray	6	6
(South Africa) K Anderson (Germany) F Moser	4	4
(United States) E Butorac (Brazil) B Soares	6	6
(United States) S Lipsky (United States) R Ram	3	3
(Colombia) JS Cabal (Colombia) R Farah	6	4	[6]
(Spain) N Almagro (Spain) A Ramos	2	6	[10]
(Netherlands) R Haase (Finland) J Nieminen	5	6	[10]
WC	(Spain) D Gimeno-Traver (Spain) A Montañés	7	3	[4]

Second round
7	(Pakistan) A-u-H Qureshi (Netherlands) J-J Rojer	6	5	[10]
(United Kingdom) A Murray (United Kingdom) J Murray	2	7	[8]
(United States) E Butorac (Brazil) B Soares	6	6^{3}	[10]
4	(Poland) M Fyrstenberg (Poland) M Matkowski	3	7^{7}	[12]
6	(Mexico) S González (Germany) C Kas	3	7^{7}	[10]
(Spain) N Almagro (Spain) A Ramos	6	6^{3}	[8]
(Netherlands) R Haase (Finland) J Nieminen	6	4	[12]
2	(Belarus) M Mirnyi (Canada) D Nestor	4	6	[14]

Quarterfinals
7	(Pakistan) A-u-H Qureshi (Netherlands) J-J Rojer	3	7^{10}	[7]
4	(Poland) M Fyrstenberg (Poland) M Matkowski	6	6^{8}	[10]
6	(Mexico) S González (Germany) C Kas	5	4
2	(Belarus) M Mirnyi (Canada) D Nestor	7	6

Semifinals
4	(Poland) M Fyrstenberg (Poland) M Matkowski	6	0	[10]
2	(Belarus) M Mirnyi (Canada) D Nestor	3	6	[6]
