= 2012 International German Open – Singles =

Singles
- 2012 International German Open

Final
- Champion: (Argentina) Juan Mónaco
- Runner-up: (Germany) Tommy Haas
- Score: 7–5, 6–4

Details
- Draw: 32
- Seeds: 8

Events
Singles	Doubles
- International German Open

Gilles Simon was the defending singles champion, but lost in the second round to Tommy Haas.
Haas went to the final, but lost to third-seeded Juan Mónaco 5–7, 4–6.

== Seeds ==
1. (Spain) Nicolás Almagro (semifinals)
2. (France) Gilles Simon (second round)
3. (Argentina) Juan Mónaco (champion)
4. (Croatia) Marin Čilić (semifinals)
5. (Spain) Fernando Verdasco (first round)
6. (Germany) Philipp Kohlschreiber (quarterfinals)
7. (Germany) Florian Mayer (quarterfinals)
8. (Serbia) Viktor Troicki (first round)

== Draw ==
Key

- Q = Qualifier
- WC = Wild card
- LL = Lucky loser
- Alt = Alternate
- ITF = ITF entry
- PR = Protected ranking
- SR = Special ranking
- SE = Special exempt
- JE = Junior exempt
- JR = Junior Accelerator Programme entrant
- CO = College Accelerator Programme entrant
- NG = Next Gen Accelerator Program entrant
- w/o = Walkover
- r = Retired
- d = Defaulted

=== Finals ===
Semifinals
1	(Spain) Nicolás Almagro	6	3	4
3	(Argentina) Juan Mónaco	3	6	6
4	(Croatia) Marin Čilić	6^{7}	0
WC	(Germany) Tommy Haas	7^{9}	6

Final
3	(Argentina) Juan Mónaco	7	6
WC	(Germany) Tommy Haas	5	4

=== Top half ===
First round
1	(Spain) N Almagro	6	6
(Germany) T Kamke	4	1
(Finland) J Nieminen	7	4	0
(Russia) N Davydenko	5	6	6
Q	(Turkey) M İlhan	5	2
(Italy) F Fognini	7	6
(Germany) B Phau	6	2	3
6	(Germany) P Kohlschreiber	4	6	6
3	(Argentina) J Mónaco	6	3	7
(Germany) C-M Stebe	4	6	5
(Spain) R Ramírez Hidalgo	6	4	3
Q	(Spain) D Muñoz de la Nava	1	6	6
(France) J Chardy	6	6
(Spain) A Montañés	4	2
WC	(Germany) J Reister	6	6
5	(Spain) F Verdasco	2	3

Second round
1	(Spain) N Almagro	6	6
(Russia) N Davydenko	4	3
(Italy) F Fognini	5	2
6	(Germany) P Kohlschreiber	7	6
3	(Argentina) J Mónaco	7^{7}	6
Q	(Spain) D Muñoz de la Nava	6^{4}	3
(France) J Chardy	7	6
WC	(Germany) J Reister	5	4

Quarterfinals
1	(Spain) N Almagro	7	7
6	(Germany) P Kohlschreiber	5	5
3	(Argentina) J Mónaco	6	7
(France) J Chardy	3	5

Semifinals
1	(Spain) N Almagro	6	3	4
3	(Argentina) J Mónaco	3	6	6

=== Bottom half ===
First round
8	(Serbia) V Troicki	7	3	4
(Czech Republic) L Rosol	5	6	6
(Spain) P Andújar	1	4
(Spain) A Ramos	6	6
Q	(Argentina) F Delbonis	5	6	6
(Spain) T Robredo	7	0	1
(Italy) F Cipolla	3	4
4	(Croatia) M Čilić	6	6
7	(Germany) F Mayer	7^{9}	7
Q	(Argentina) H Zeballos	6^{7}	5
WC	(Germany) M Bachinger	4	2
(Netherlands) R Haase	6	6
WC	(Germany) T Haas	6	6
(Slovakia) M Kližan	2	1
(Argentina) C Berlocq	6	6^{5}	1
2	(France) G Simon	4	7^{7}	6

Second round
(Czech Republic) L Rosol	6^{8}	6	3
(Spain) A Ramos	7^{10}	4	6
Q	(Argentina) F Delbonis	3	2
4	(Croatia) M Čilić	6	6
7	(Germany) F Mayer	6	6
(Netherlands) R Haase	2	1
WC	(Germany) T Haas	4	6	6
2	(France) G Simon	6	3	4

Quarterfinals
(Spain) A Ramos	4	6^{5}
4	(Croatia) M Čilić	6	7^{7}
7	(Germany) F Mayer	1	4
WC	(Germany) T Haas	6	6

Semifinals
4	(Croatia) M Čilić	6^{7}	0
WC	(Germany) T Haas	7^{9}	6

== Qualifying ==
=== Seeds ===
1. (Brazil) Rogério Dutra da Silva (qualifying competition)
2. (Argentina) Horacio Zeballos (qualified)
3. (Argentina) Federico Delbonis (qualified)
4. (Portugal) Frederico Gil (first round)
5. (Spain) Daniel Muñoz de la Nava (qualified)
6. (Argentina) Eduardo Schwank (first round)
7. (Italy) Alessandro Giannessi (first round)
8. (Russia) Teymuraz Gabashvili (first round)

=== Qualifiers ===
1. (Spain) Daniel Muñoz de la Nava
2. (Argentina) Horacio Zeballos
3. (Argentina) Federico Delbonis
4. (Turkey) Marsel İlhan

=== Draw ===
==== First qualifier ====
First round
1	(Brazil) Rogério Dutra da Silva	6	6
(Germany) Peter Gojowczyk	4	2
(Italy) Simone Vagnozzi	4	3
5	(Spain) Daniel Muñoz de la Nava	6	6

Qualifying competition
1	(Brazil) Rogério Dutra da Silva	4	3
5	(Spain) Daniel Muñoz de la Nava	6	6

==== Second qualifier ====
First round
2	(Argentina) Horacio Zeballos	6	3	6
WC	(Germany) Jan-Lennard Struff	4	6	2
(Germany) Dominik Meffert	7^{7}	6
8	(Russia) Teymuraz Gabashvili	6^{2}	4

Qualifying competition
2	(Argentina) Horacio Zeballos	6	6^{8}	7^{7}
(Germany) Dominik Meffert	2	7^{10}	6^{3}

==== Third qualifier ====
First round
3	(Argentina) Federico Delbonis	6	6
(Finland) Harri Heliövaara	4	2
WC	(Germany) Bastian Knittel	7^{7}	6
6	(Argentina) Eduardo Schwank	6^{2}	1

Qualifying competition
3	(Argentina) Federico Delbonis	6	6
WC	(Germany) Bastian Knittel	4	3

==== Fourth qualifier ====
First round
4	(Portugal) Frederico Gil	3	2
(Turkey) Marsel İlhan	6	6
WC	(Germany) Kevin Krawietz	6	7^{7}
7	(Italy) Alessandro Giannessi	3	6^{2}

Qualifying competition
(Turkey) Marsel İlhan	7	6
WC	(Germany) Kevin Krawietz	5	4
