= 2012 Open de Nice Côte d'Azur – Doubles =

Doubles
- 2012 Open de Nice Côte d'Azur

Final
- Champions: (United States) Bob Bryan (United States) Mike Bryan
- Runners-up: (Austria) Oliver Marach (Slovakia) Filip Polášek
- Score: 7–6^{(7–5)}, 6–3

Events
Singles	Doubles
← 2011 ·	Open de Nice Côte d'Azur	· 2013 →

Eric Butorac and Jean-Julien Rojer were the defending champions but decided not to participate together.
Butorac played alongside Bruno Soares, while Rojer partnered up with Aisam-ul-Haq Qureshi.
Butorac lost in the first round to Paul Hanley and Julian Knowle and Rojer lost in the semifinals to American Bob and Mike Bryan, who won the tournament defeating Oliver Marach and Filip Polášek 7–6^{(7–5)}, 6–3 in the final.

== Seeds ==
1. (United States) Bob Bryan / (United States) Mike Bryan (champions)
2. (India) Rohan Bopanna / (Spain) David Marrero (first round)
3. (Pakistan) Aisam-ul-Haq Qureshi / (Netherlands) Jean-Julien Rojer (semifinals)
4. (Colombia) Juan Sebastián Cabal / (Mexico) Santiago González (quarterfinals)

== Draw ==
=== Key ===
- Q = Qualifier
- WC = Wild card
- LL = Lucky loser
- Alt = Alternate
- SE = Special exempt
- PR = Protected ranking
- ITF = ITF entry
- JE = Junior exempt
- w/o = Walkover
- r = Retired
- d = Defaulted
- SR = Special ranking

=== Draw ===
First round
1	(United States) B Bryan (United States) M Bryan	6	6
(Australia) M Ebden (Australia) B Tomic	2	2
(Israel) J Erlich (Israel) A Ram	5	6	[10]
(Italy) D Bracciali (United Kingdom) J Murray	7	2	[12]
3	(Pakistan) A-u-H Qureshi (Netherlands) J-J Rojer	7	6
(United States) J Cerretani (Brazil) A Sá	5	2
(United States) S Lipsky (United States) R Ram	6	6
(Russia) M Elgin (Uzbekistan) D Istomin	3	4
(United States) E Butorac (Brazil) B Soares	6	3	[9]
(Australia) P Hanley (Austria) J Knowle	3	6	[11]
(Philippines) TC Huey (Germany) F Moser	4	6	[6]
4	(Colombia) JS Cabal (Mexico) S González	6	3	[10]
(Austria) O Marach (Slovakia) F Polášek	7	6
WC	(France) N Mahut (France) É Roger-Vasselin	5	3
WC	(United States) J Isner (United States) S Querrey	6	6
2	(India) R Bopanna (Spain) D Marrero	3	3

Quarterfinals
1	(United States) B Bryan (United States) M Bryan	4	6	[10]
(Italy) D Bracciali (United Kingdom) J Murray	6	2	[7]
3	(Pakistan) A-u-H Qureshi (Netherlands) J-J Rojer	6	6
(United States) S Lipsky (United States) R Ram	3	2
(Australia) P Hanley (Austria) J Knowle	6	6
4	(Colombia) JS Cabal (Mexico) S González	3	2
(Austria) O Marach (Slovakia) F Polášek	6	6
WC	(United States) J Isner (United States) S Querrey	3	0

Semifinals
1	(United States) B Bryan (United States) M Bryan	6	6
3	(Pakistan) A-u-H Qureshi (Netherlands) J-J Rojer	4	4
(Australia) P Hanley (Austria) J Knowle	4	7	[7]
(Austria) O Marach (Slovakia) F Polášek	6	5	[10]

Final
1	(United States) B Bryan (United States) M Bryan	7^{7}	6
(Austria) O Marach (Slovakia) F Polášek	6^{5}	3
