= 2012 International German Open – Doubles =

Doubles
- 2012 International German Open

Final
- Champions: (Spain) David Marrero (Spain) Fernando Verdasco
- Runners-up: (Brazil) Rogério Dutra da Silva (Spain) Daniel Muñoz de la Nava
- Score: 6–4, 6–3

Details
- Draw: 16
- Seeds: 4

Events
Singles	Doubles
- International German Open

Oliver Marach and Alexander Peya were the defending champions but decided not to participate together.
Marach was to partner Daniele Bracciali but withdrew before the tournament, while Peya played alongside Nenad Zimonjić, but lost in the quarterfinals.
David Marrero and Fernando Verdasco won the title by beating Rogério Dutra da Silva and Daniel Muñoz de la Nava 6–4, 6–3 in the final.

== Seeds ==
1. (India) Mahesh Bhupathi / (India) Rohan Bopanna (quarterfinals)
2. (Austria) Alexander Peya / (Serbia) Nenad Zimonjić (quarterfinals)
3. (Italy) Daniele Bracciali / (Austria) Oliver Marach (withdrew)
4. (Israel) Jonathan Erlich / (Israel) Andy Ram (semifinals)

== Draw ==
Key

- Q = Qualifier
- WC = Wild card
- LL = Lucky loser
- Alt = Alternate
- ITF = ITF entry
- PR = Protected ranking
- SR = Special ranking
- SE = Special exempt
- JE = Junior exempt
- JR = Junior Accelerator Programme entrant
- CO = College Accelerator Programme entrant
- NG = Next Gen Accelerator Program entrant
- w/o = Walkover
- r = Retired
- d = Defaulted

=== Draw ===
First round
1	(India) M Bhupathi (India) R Bopanna	6	7^{7}
(Brazil) B Soares (Germany) A Waske	3	6^{4}
(France) J Chardy (France) G Simon	6	5	[10]
(Germany) C Kas (Serbia) V Troicki	1	7	[4]
Alt	(Brazil) R Dutra da Silva (Spain) D Muñoz de la Nava	7^{7}	6
(Poland) M Fyrstenberg (Germany) P Kohlschreiber	6^{2}	4
(Netherlands) R Haase (Netherlands) J-J Rojer	6	6
(Argentina) J Mónaco (Argentina) E Schwank	3	4
(Spain) P Andújar (Italy) F Fognini	6	6
WC	(Germany) R Kern (Germany) K Krawietz	1	4
(Argentina) C Berlocq (Czech Republic) F Čermák	6^{6}	7^{7}	[3]
4	(Israel) J Erlich (Israel) A Ram	7^{8}	6^{3}	[10]
(United Kingdom) J Murray (Brazil) A Sá	4	7	[7]
(Spain) D Marrero (Spain) F Verdasco	6	5	[10]
WC	(Germany) T Kamke (Germany) J Reister	4	1
2	(Austria) A Peya (Serbia) N Zimonjić	6	6

Quarterfinals
1	(India) M Bhupathi (India) R Bopanna	7	3	[7]
(France) J Chardy (France) G Simon	5	6	[10]
Alt	(Brazil) R Dutra da Silva (Spain) D Muñoz de la Nava	6	3	[13]
(Netherlands) R Haase (Netherlands) J-J Rojer	3	6	[11]
(Spain) P Andújar (Italy) F Fognini	3	1
4	(Israel) J Erlich (Israel) A Ram	6	6
(Spain) D Marrero (Spain) F Verdasco	7	4	[10]
2	(Austria) A Peya (Serbia) N Zimonjić	5	6	[8]

Semifinals
(France) J Chardy (France) G Simon	0	2
Alt	(Brazil) R Dutra da Silva (Spain) D Muñoz de la Nava	6	6
4	(Israel) J Erlich (Israel) A Ram	7^{7}	4	[12]
(Spain) D Marrero (Spain) F Verdasco	6^{0}	6	[14]

Final
Alt	(Brazil) R Dutra da Silva (Spain) D Muñoz de la Nava	4	3
(Spain) D Marrero (Spain) F Verdasco	6	6
