= 2012 ATP World Tour Finals =

- Date: 5–12 November
- Edition: 43rd (singles) / 38th (doubles)
- Category: World Tour Finals
- Draw: 8S / 8D
- Prize money: $5,500,000
- Surface: Hard / indoor
- Location: London, United Kingdom
- Venue: O_{2} Arena

Champions

Singles
- (Serbia) Novak Djokovic

Doubles
- (Spain) Marcel Granollers / (Spain) Marc López
- ATP World Tour Finals

The 2012 ATP World Tour Finals (also known as the 2012 Barclays ATP World Tour Finals for sponsorship reasons) was a tennis year-end tournament that was played at the O_{2} Arena in London, United Kingdom, between 5 and 12 November 2012.

== Champions ==
=== Singles ===
(Serbia) Novak Djokovic defeated (Switzerland) Roger Federer, 7–6^{(8–6)}, 7–5

- It was Djokovic's 6th title of the year and 34th of his career. It was his 2nd win at the event, winning in 2008.

=== Doubles ===
(Spain) Marcel Granollers / (Spain) Marc López defeated (India) Mahesh Bhupathi / (India) Rohan Bopanna, 7–5, 3–6, [10–3]

== Tournament ==
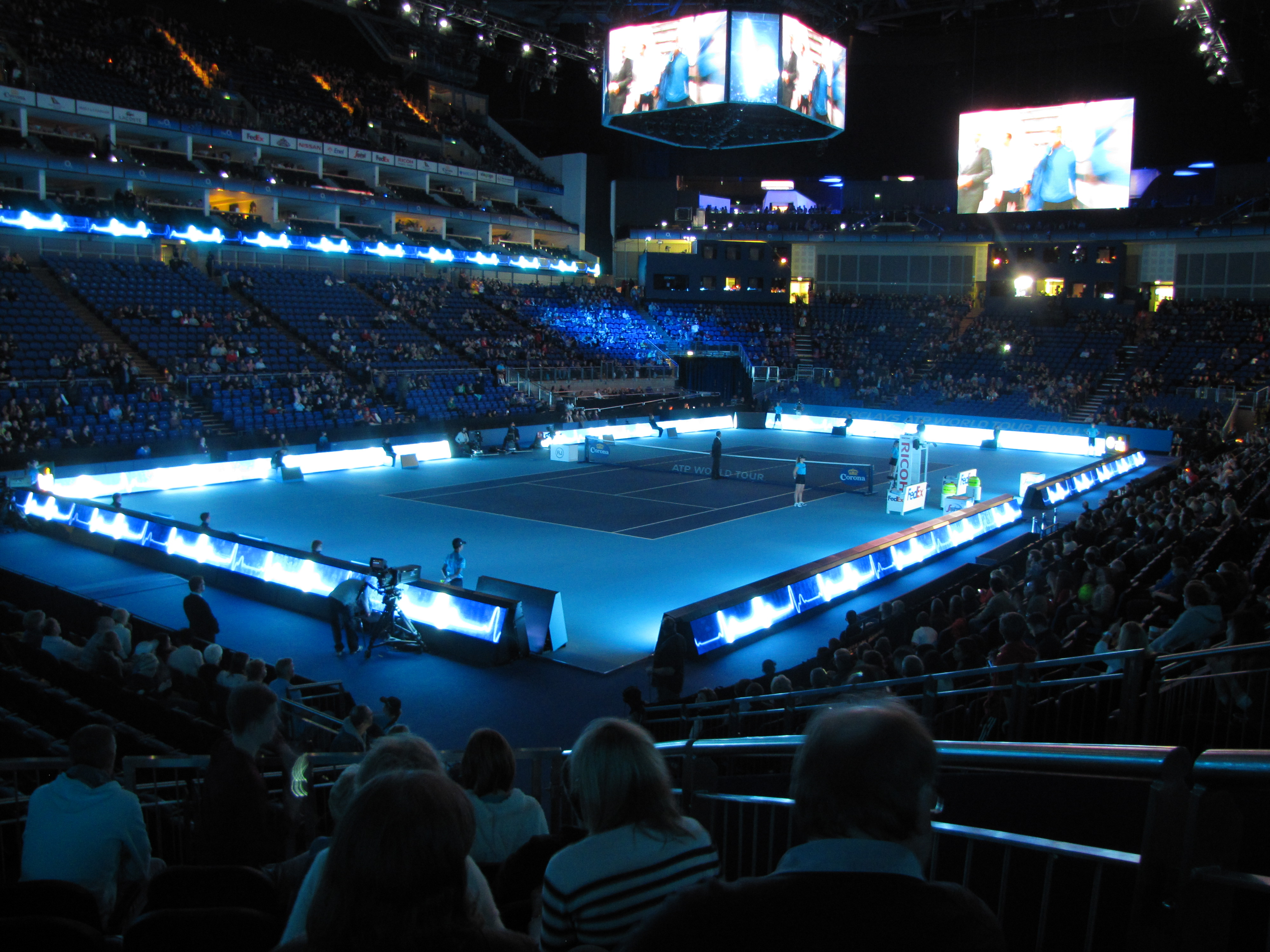
Singles play on the O_{2} Arena during the 2012 event

The 2012 ATP World Tour Finals took place from 5 to 12 November at the O_{2} Arena in London, United Kingdom. It was the 43rd edition of the tournament (38th in doubles). The tournament was run by the Association of Tennis Professionals (ATP) and was part of the 2012 ATP World Tour. The event took place on indoor hard courts. It served as the season-ending championships for players on the ATP Tour. The eight players who qualified for the event were split into two groups of four. During this stage, players competed in a round-robin format (meaning players played against all the other players in their group). The two players with the best results in each group progressed to the semifinals, where the winners of a group faced the runners-up of the other group. This stage, however, was a knock-out stage. The doubles competition used the same format.

=== Format ===
The Barclays ATP World Tour Finals had a round-robin format, with eight players/teams divided into two groups of four. The eight seeds were determined by the ATP rankings and ATP Doubles Team Rankings on the Monday after the last ATP World Tour tournament of the calendar year. All singles matches were the best of three tie-break sets, including the final. All doubles matches were two sets (no ad) and a Match Tie-break.

=== Draw ===
The top seeded players/teams were placed in Group A and the second seeded player/team were placed in Group B. Players/teams seeded 3 and 4, 5 and 6, 7 and 8, were then drawn in pairs with the first drawn placed in Group A. Each player/team played the three other players/teams in his group. The winner of each group (best overall record) was placed in separate semi-final brackets, with the top player/team in Group A playing the runner-up in Group B, and vice versa. If two or more players/teams were tied after the round robin matches, the ties were broken by the Tie-Break Procedure.

== Points and prize money ==
Stage	Singles	Doubles^{1}	Points
Champion	RR + $1,240,000	RR +$190,000	RR + 900
Runner-up	RR + $410,000	RR +$65,000	RR + 400
Round robin win per match	$130,000	$25,000	200
Participation fee	$130,000^{2}	$65,000^{3}	–
Alternates	$75,000	$25,000	–

- RR is points or prize money won in the round robin stage.
- ^{1} Prize money for doubles is per team.
- ^{2} Pro-rated on a per-match basis: $75,000 = 1 match, $100,000 = 2 matches, $130,000 = 3 matches
- ^{3} 3 Pro-rated on a per-match basis: $30,000 = 1 match, $50,000 = 2 matches, $65,000 = 3 matches

== Qualification ==
The top eight players (or teams) with the most countable points accumulated in Grand Slam, ATP World Tour, and Davis Cup tournaments during the year qualify for the 2012 ATP World Tour Finals. Countable points include points earned in 2012, plus points earned at the 2011 Davis Cup final and the late-season 2011 Challengers played after the 2011 ATP World Tour Finals. To qualify, a player who finished in the 2011 year-end top 30 must compete in four Grand Slam tournaments and eight ATP World Tour Masters 1000 tournaments during 2012. They can count their best six results from ATP World Tour 500, ATP World Tour 250 and other events (Challengers, Futures, Davis Cup, Olympics) toward their ranking. To count their best six, players must have fulfilled their commitment to 500 events – 4 total per year (at least 1 after the US Open). Additionally, commitment players will no longer need to enter the 500 events 12 weeks in advance but instead go back the normal 6-week entry deadline. If eligible to play in one of the Grand Slam or ATP World Tour Masters 1000 tournaments, a player must count the points from these tournaments, even if it is 'a zero pointer' because he missed the event. Just as in Formula One and numerous other sports, if a competitor misses a race or an event, he loses his chance to earn points. Players with direct acceptance who do not play an ATP World Tour Masters 1000 tournament will be suspended from a subsequent ATP World Tour Masters 1000 event, which will be the next highest points earned ATP World Tour Masters 1000 event within the next 12 months. If an injured player is on site within the first three days of a tournament to conduct promotional activities over a two-day period, a suspension will not be enforced but a 0-pointer will be counted on a player's ranking. If a player does not play enough ATP 500 events and does not have an ATP 250 or Challenger appearance with a better result, the Davis Cup is counted in the 500s table (if the player entered or achieved better results). If a player does not play enough ATP 250 or Challenger events, the World Team Championship is counted in the 250s table (if the player entered or achieved better results). If a player could not be present in all required tournament classes (i.e. because of an injury), all uncounted ATP 250 or Challenger results are eligible to be included in his 18 valid tournaments. In teams rankings, Challenger points are excluded.

A player who is out of competition for 30 or more days, due to a verified injury, is not penalized. The 2012 ATP World Tour Finals counts as an additional 19th tournament in the ranking of its eight qualifiers at season's end, while the Davis Cup Final points count towards the next year's race.

== Contenders points breakdown ==
=== Singles ===
- Players in gold were the qualifiers.
- Player in bold won the title at the finals.
- Players in whose seed is – withdrew before the tournament.

Seed	Rank	Athlete	Grand Slam				ATP World Tour Masters 1000								Best Other						Total points	Tours
Seed	Rank	Athlete	**AO**	**FO**	**W**	**USO**	**IW**	**MI**	**MA**	**RO**	**CA**	**CI**	**SH**	**PA**	1	2	3	4	5	6	Total points	Tours
1	1	(Serbia) Novak Djokovic*	**W** **2,000**	F 1,200	SF; 720	F 1,200	SF; 360	**W** **1,000**	QF; 180	F 600	**W** **1,000**	F 600	**W** **1,000**	R32; 10	F 600	**W** **500**	SF; 270	SF; 180	- 0		11,420	17
2	2	(Switzerland) Roger Federer*	SF; 720	SF; 720	**W** **2,000**	QF; 360	**W** **1,000**	R32; 45	**W** **1,000**	SF; 360	A 0	**W** **1,000**	SF; 360	A 0	**W** **500**	**W** **500**	S 450	F 300	F 150	- 0	9,465	20
3	3	(United Kingdom) Andy Murray*	SF; 720	QF; 360	F 1,200	**W** **2,000**	R64; 10	F 600	A 0	R16; 90	R16; 90	R16; 90	F 600	R16; 90	**G** **750**	F 300	**W** **250**	QF; 180	SF; 180	QF; 90	7,600	19
–	4	(Spain) Rafael Nadal*	F 1,200	**W** **2,000**	R64; 45	A 0	SF; 360	SF; 360	R16; 90	**W** **1,000**	A 0	A 0	A 0	A 0	**W** **1,000**	**W** **500**	DC; 150	SF; 90	- 0	- 0	6,795	11
4	5	(Spain) David Ferrer*	QF; 360	SF; 720	QF; 360	SF; 720	R32; 45	QF; 180	QF; 180	SF; 360	A 0	R32; 10	A 0	**W** **1000**	**W** **500**	**W** **500**	F 300	DC; **295**	**W** **250**	**W** **250**	6,030	23
5	6	(Czech Republic) Tomáš Berdych*	QF; 360	R16; 180	R128; 10	SF; 720	R16; 90	R32; 45	F 600	QF; 180	R16; 90	R16; 90	SF; 360	QF; 180	SF; 360	DC; 310	**W** **250**	**W** **250**	SF; 180	F 150	4,405	23
6	7	(Argentina) Juan Martín del Potro*	QF; 360	QF; 360	R16; 180	QF; 360	QF; 180	R16; 90	SF; 360	R16; 90	R32; 10	SF; 360	A 0	R16; 90	**W** **500**	B 340	F 300	**W** **250**	**W** **250**	- 0	4,080	22
7	8	(France) Jo-Wilfried Tsonga*	R16; 180	QF; 360	SF; 720	R64; 45	R16; 90	QF; 180	R16; 90	QF; 180	R32; 10	A 0	QF; 180	QF; 180	F 300	**W** **250**	**W** **250**	QF; 180	DC; 145	F 150	3,490	25
8	9	(Serbia) Janko Tipsarević*	R32; 90	R16; 180	R32; 90	QF; 360	R32; 45	QF; 180	SF; 360	R32; 10	SF; 360	R32; 10	R16; 90	QF; 180	**W** **250**	WTC; 250	F 150	F 150	DC; 145	QF; 90	2,990	27

=== Doubles ===
Rank	Team	Points																		Total Points	Tours
Rank	Team	1	2	3	4	5	6	7	8	9	10	11	12	13	14	15	16	17	18	Total Points	Tours
1	(United States) Bob Bryan (United States) Mike Bryan	**W** **2,000**	F 1,200	F 1,200	**W** **1,000**	**W** **1,000**	SF; 720	**W** **500**	SF; 360	SF; 360	**W** **250**	**W** **250**	QF; 180	QF; 180	F 150	QF; 90	QF; 45	R16; 0	R16; 0	9,485	22
2	(Belarus) Max Mirnyi (Canada) Daniel Nestor	**W** **2,000**	SF; 720	F 600	F 600	**W** **500**	SF; 360	SF; 360	**W** **250**	**W** **250**	SF; 180	QF; 180	QF; 180	QF; 180	QF; 180	R16; 90	QF; 45	R16; 0	R64; 0	6,675	20
3	(India) Leander Paes (Czech Republic) Radek Štěpánek	**W** **2,000**	F 1,200	**W** **1,000**	**W** **1,000**	F 300	QF; 180	QF; 180	QF; 180	R16; 180	QF; 45	R16; 0	R16; 0							6,265	12
4	(Sweden) Robert Lindstedt (Romania) Horia Tecău	F 1,200	**W** **1,000**	SF; 720	F 600	SF; 360	SF; 360	F 300	**W** **250**	**W** **250**	**W** **250**	R16; 180	R32; 90	SF; 90	QF; 90	QF; 90	R16; 90	QF; 45	R16; 0	5,965	23
5	(India) Mahesh Bhupathi (India) Rohan Bopanna	**W** **1,000**	**W** **500**	F 600	F 600	SF; 360	SF; 360	SF; 360	R16; 180	SF; 90	R32; 90	QF; 90	SF; 90	QF; 90	QF; 45	R16; 0	R32; 0	R16; 0	R64; 0	4,455	22
6	(Spain) Marcel Granollers (Spain) Marc López	**W** **1,000**	SF; 720	F 600	SF; 360	F 300	F 300	**W** **250**	SF; 180	QF; 180	QF; 180	F 150	QF; 90	DC; 50	R64; 0	R16; 0				4,270	18
7	(Pakistan) Aisam-ul-Haq Qureshi (Netherlands) Jean-Julien Rojer	SF; 720	SF; 720	F 600	**W** **250**	**W** **250**	QF; 180	QF; 180	QF; 180	R16; 180	QF; 180	R16; 180	QF; 90	R16; 90	QF; 90	SF; 90	SF; 90	QF; 45	R32; 0	4,115	23
11	(United Kingdom) Jonathan Marray (Denmark) Frederik Nielsen	**W** **2,000**	QF; 90	R32; 90	R32; 0															2,180	5

== Qualified players ==
=== Singles ===
#	Players	Points	Tours	Date Qualified
1	Novak Djokovic (SRB)	11,420	17	9 July
2	Roger Federer (SUI)	9,465	20	9 July
3	Andy Murray (GBR)	7,600	19	5 September
inj.	Rafael Nadal (ESP)	6,795	19	9 July
4	David Ferrer (ESP)	6,030	24	15 October
5	Tomáš Berdych (CZE)	4,405	23	22 October
6	Juan Martín del Potro (ARG)	4,080	22	25 October
7	Jo-Wilfried Tsonga (FRA)	3,490	25	1 November
8	Janko Tipsarević (SRB)	2,990	27	1 November

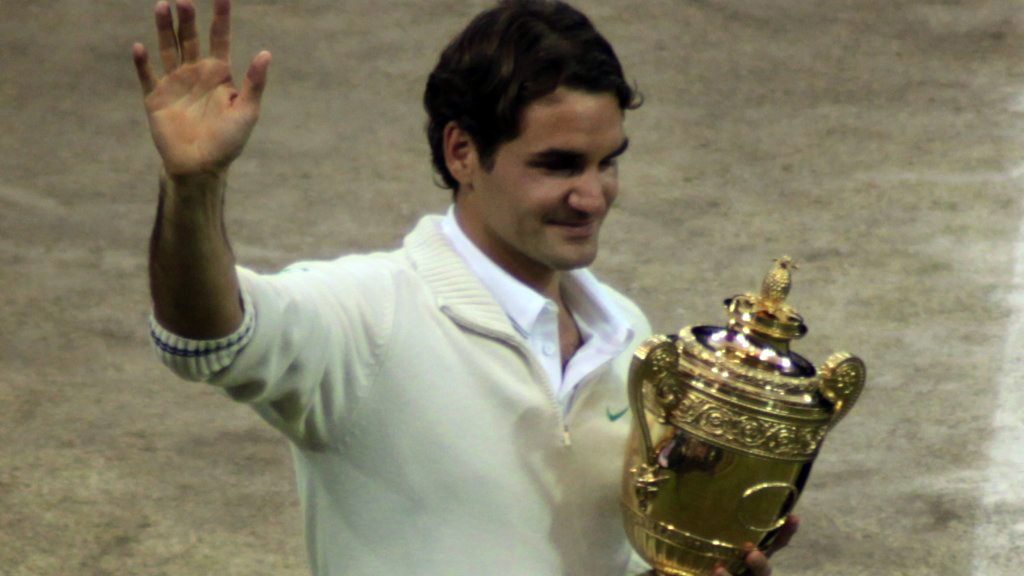
Roger Federer wins his record 17th Grand Slam at Wimbledon

On 7 July, the first three qualifiers were announced during the Wimbledon tournament, they were Roger Federer, Novak Djokovic, and Rafael Nadal.

Roger Federer began his season at the Qatar Open as the defending champion but withdrew before his semifinal match. At the Australian Open he lost to Rafael Nadal in the semifinals. He then went on to win 16 matches in a row, beginning with the ABN AMRO World Tennis Tournament defeating Juan Martín del Potro in the final, and then back-to-back titles in Dubai Tennis Championships over Andy Murray and BNP Paribas Open over John Isner. His streak ended in the third round of the Sony Ericsson Open losing to Andy Roddick. He bounced back at the Mutua Madrid Open, winning the title over Tomáš Berdych. He then lost in the semifinals of the Internazionali BNL d'Italia and French Open to Novak Djokovic. In the grass season, he reached three finals, first at the Gerry Weber Open losing to Tommy Haas . He then won his 17th Slam at the Wimbledon defeating Murray in the final. In the Olympics, he scored his first singles medal, winning the silver, losing in the final to Murray. He then won his 6th title of the year at Western & Southern Open over Djokovic, not dropping a set or his serve during the entire tournament. In the final Slam of the year, at the US Open he fell in the quarter-finals for the first time in the tournament to Berdych. He then played the Swiss Indoors Basel as the defending champion but lost to Juan Martín del Potro in the final. Federer has qualified for his 11th Year-End Championship and is the defending champion.

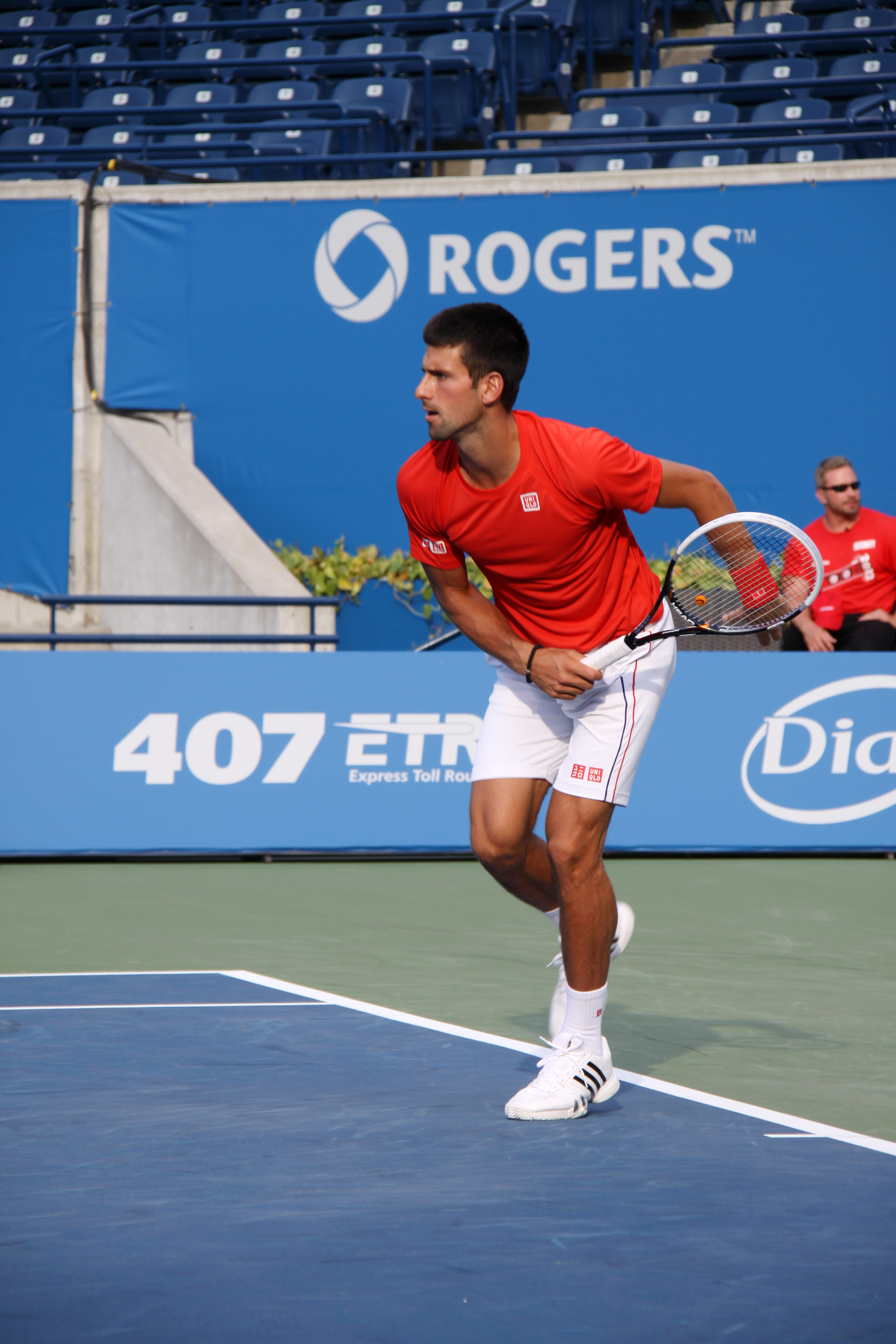
Novak Djokovic won his third Australian Open

Novak Djokovic began the year by defending his Australian Open title after back-to-back five set wins over Andy Murray in the semifinal and Rafael Nadal in the final in 5 hours and 53 minutes, the longest Grand Slam singles final in the history of professional tennis. Djokovic then won his second title of the year at the Sony Ericsson Open without dropping and set and defeating Andy Murray in the final. In the European Clay season, he was able to reach 3 finals, losing each time to Nadal. He lost in the Monte-Carlo Rolex Masters, in the Internazionali BNL d'Italia, and in his first French Open final. At Wimbledon as the defending champion, he fell in the semifinals to Roger Federer . At the Olympics, the Serbian failed the medal after losing in the Bronze medal match to Juan Martín del Potro. In the US Open Series, he reached three consecutive finals. He first won in the Rogers Cup defeating Richard Gasquet in the final. He then lost to Federer in the final of the Western & Southern Open. In the US Open as the defending champion, he lost to Murray in the final after coming back from two sets down. He is the only one to reach at least the semifinals of each Slam of the year. At the Asian swing he made a sweep winning the China Open over Jo-Wilfried Tsonga and the Shanghai Rolex Masters over Andy Murray, saving 5 match points in the second set. He has qualified for his sixth Year-End Championship.

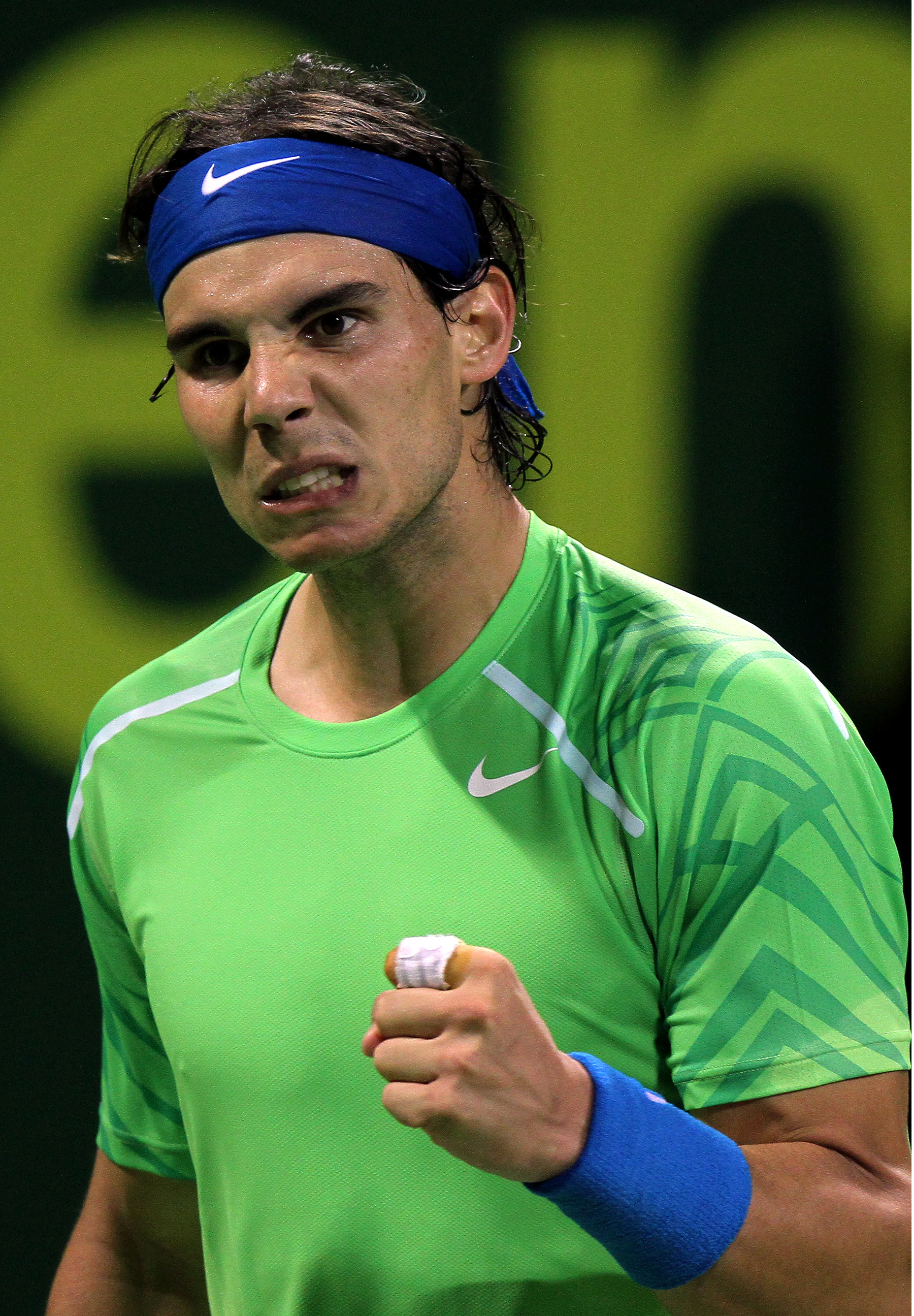
Rafael Nadal won a record 7th French Open

Rafael Nadal began his season at the Qatar Open losing to Gaël Monfils in the semifinals. He then reached the final of the Australian Open losing to Novak Djokovic. In the European clay season, Nadal started with back-to-back wins without dropping a set, winning the Monte-Carlo Rolex Masters over Djokovic and the Barcelona Open Banco Sabadell over compatriot David Ferrer. At the Madrid Open, he lost to Fernando Verdasco for the first time, thus ending his 22 match winning streak in clay. He then won again back-to-back titles in the Internazionali BNL d'Italia winning and French Open winning in a rain delayed final he defeated Djokovic on both occasions. His French Open win meant he has won the most French Open titles in the Open Era. At Wimbledon, Nadal suffered a shock loss in the second round, the first time he has lost before the second round in a Slam since 2005 Wimbledon; he lost to 100th ranked Lukáš Rosol. Nadal then withdrew from the Olympics as the defending champion from 2008 Olympics, and the US Open Series due to a knee injury. This is Nadal's 8th time to qualify for the event, however he was forced to withdraw from the tournament due to a left knee injury.

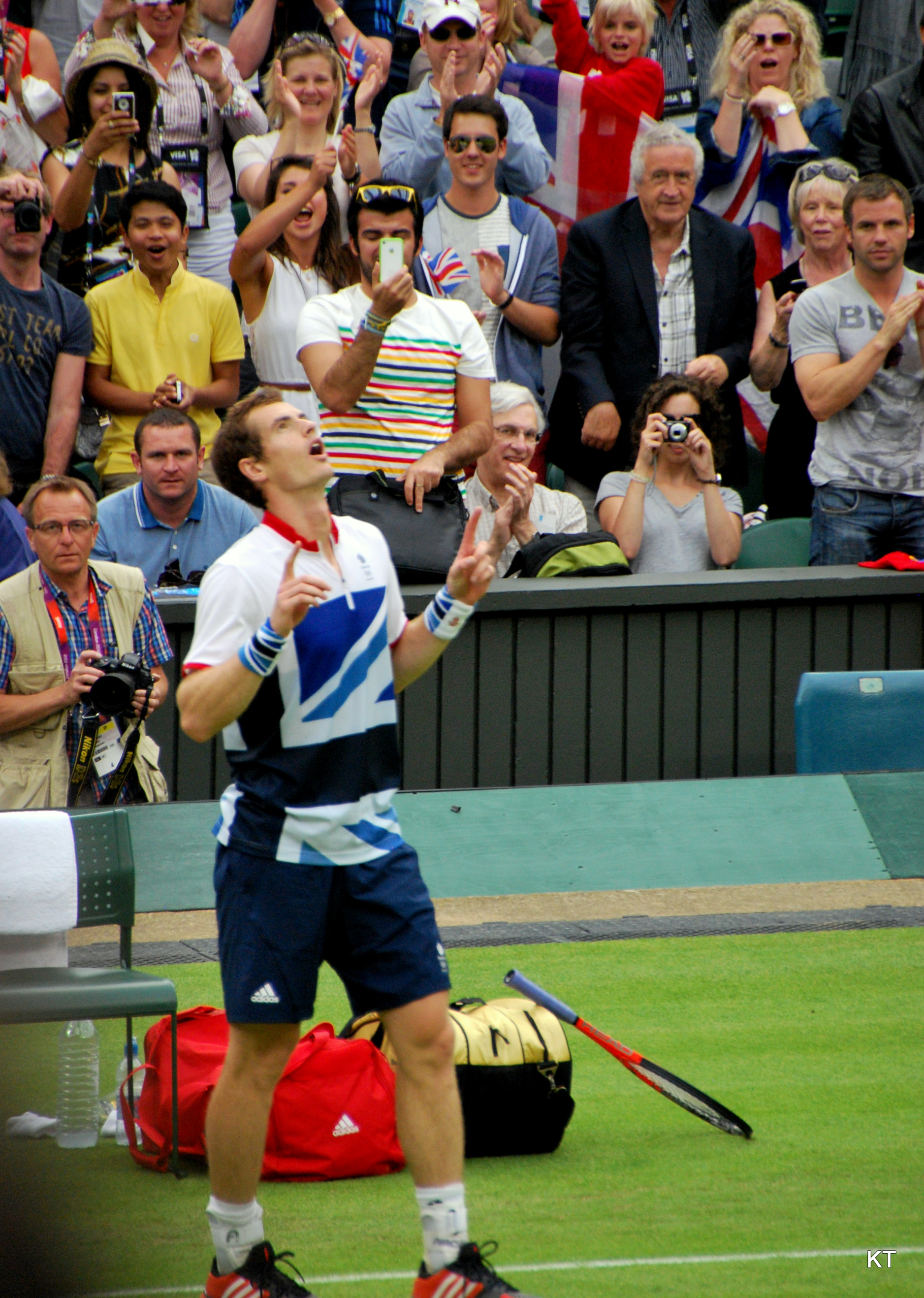
Andy Murray won the Olympic gold medal and his first slam at the US Open

On 5 September, following his 2012 US Open triumph, Andy Murray was the fourth to qualify.

Andy Murray started the year with the appointment of new coach Ivan Lendl, and opened winning the title at the Brisbane International, defeating Alexandr Dolgopolov of Ukraine in the final. Murray then competed in the Australian Open, where he reached the semifinals before being beaten by Novak Djokovic in a tightly fought match that lasted almost 5 hours. Next, at the Dubai Tennis Championships lost to Roger Federer in the final. He then reached the final of the Miami Masters, which he ultimately lost to Djokovic. At French Open, he was beaten by David Ferrer in the quarter-finals . Murray then reached the final of Wimbledon, where he lost to Roger Federer. He then reached the final of the Olympics, where he defeated Federer to win the gold medal for Britain, for the first time since 1908. In the mixed doubles final, Murray and Robson faced Victoria Azarenka and Max Mirnyi of Belarus, but lost in three sets, settling for the silver medal. At the US Open Murray went on to claim his first ever major title, winning the final against Djokovic and becoming the first British man to win a grand slam title since Fred Perry in 1936. As the defending champion he reached the final of Shanghai Rolex Masters losing to Djokovic. He served for the match at 5–4 in the second and had 5 match points, but lost his first match at the event. This is the 5th time Murray has qualified for the ATP Finals.

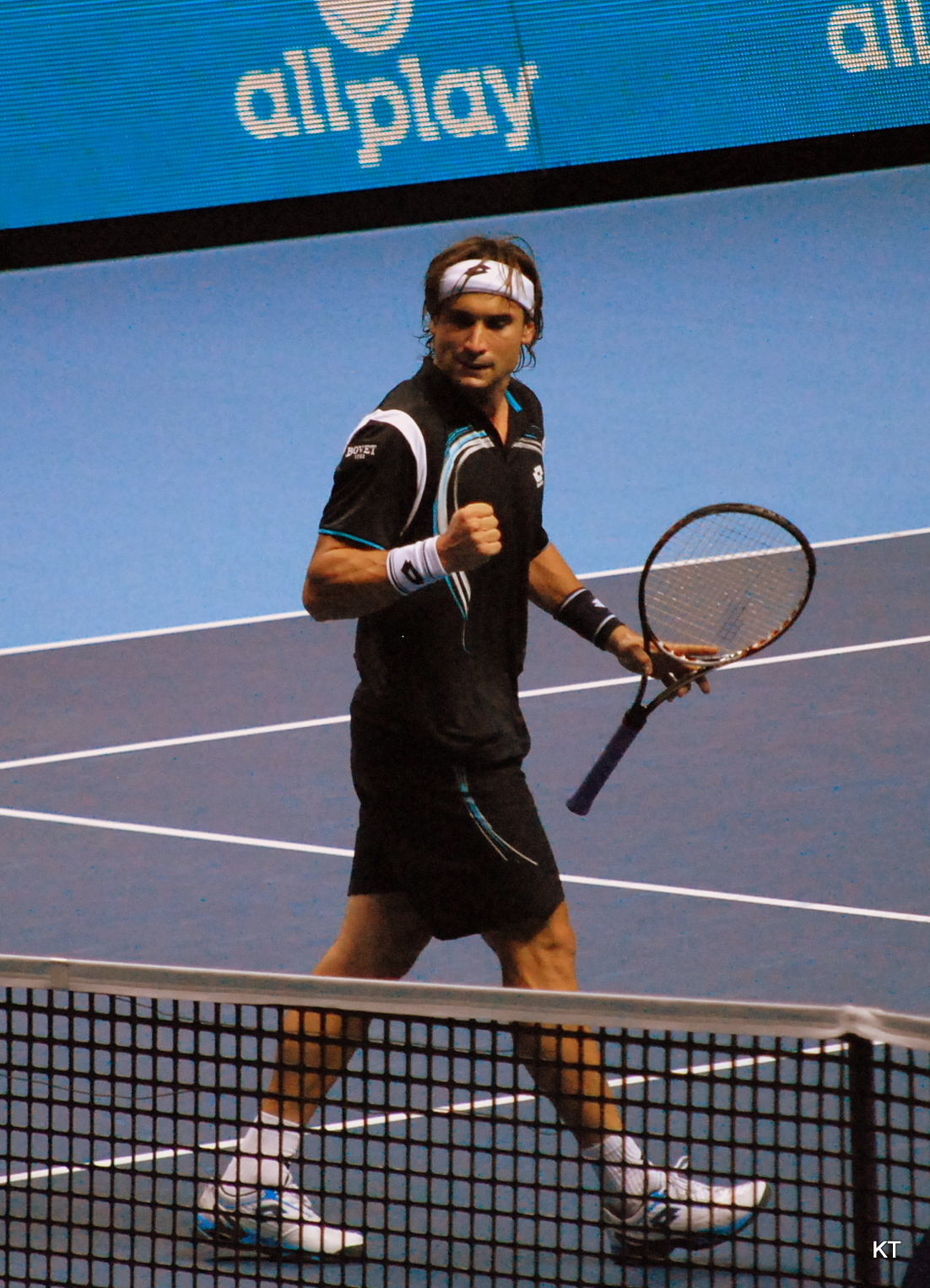
David Ferrer reached the quarter-finals of all slams.

On 15 October following the Shanghai Rolex Masters David Ferrer was announced as the fifth qualifier.

David Ferrer opened his season with a successful defence of his Heineken Open title, with a win over Belgian player Olivier Rochus for his third title at the Auckland tournament. He next entered the Australian Open and managed to reach the quarter-finals before losing to eventual champion Novak Djokovic He then went on to win back-to-back titles at the Copa Claro over Nicolás Almagro, and Abierto Mexicano Telcel over Fernando Verdasco. At the Barcelona Open Banc Sabadell he reached his 4th final of the year, losing to Rafael Nadal. At the French Open, he reached the semifinals for the first time losing to eventual champion Rafael Nadal. He then won his 4th title of the year at the UNICEF Open defeating Philipp Petzschner in the final. Ferrer reached the quarterfinals at Wimbledon, where he was beaten by eventual runner-up Murray. Ferrer then won the Swedish Open defeating compatriot Almagro in the final. At the US Open, he reached the semifinals, thus reaching at least the quarter-finals of each slam in the year, only one of four to achieve it in the year, he lost to Novak Djokovic, where the match was suspended after the first set. Ferrer then won his home tournament the Valencia Open 500 defeating Ukrainian Alexandr Dolgopolov in the final. Ferrer won his 7th title of the year, the most of any player at the BNP Paribas Masters defeating qualifier Jerzy Janowicz in the final. This is Ferrer's first Master 1000 title after finishing runner-up 3 times prior. This is the 4th time Ferrer has qualified for the finals in London.

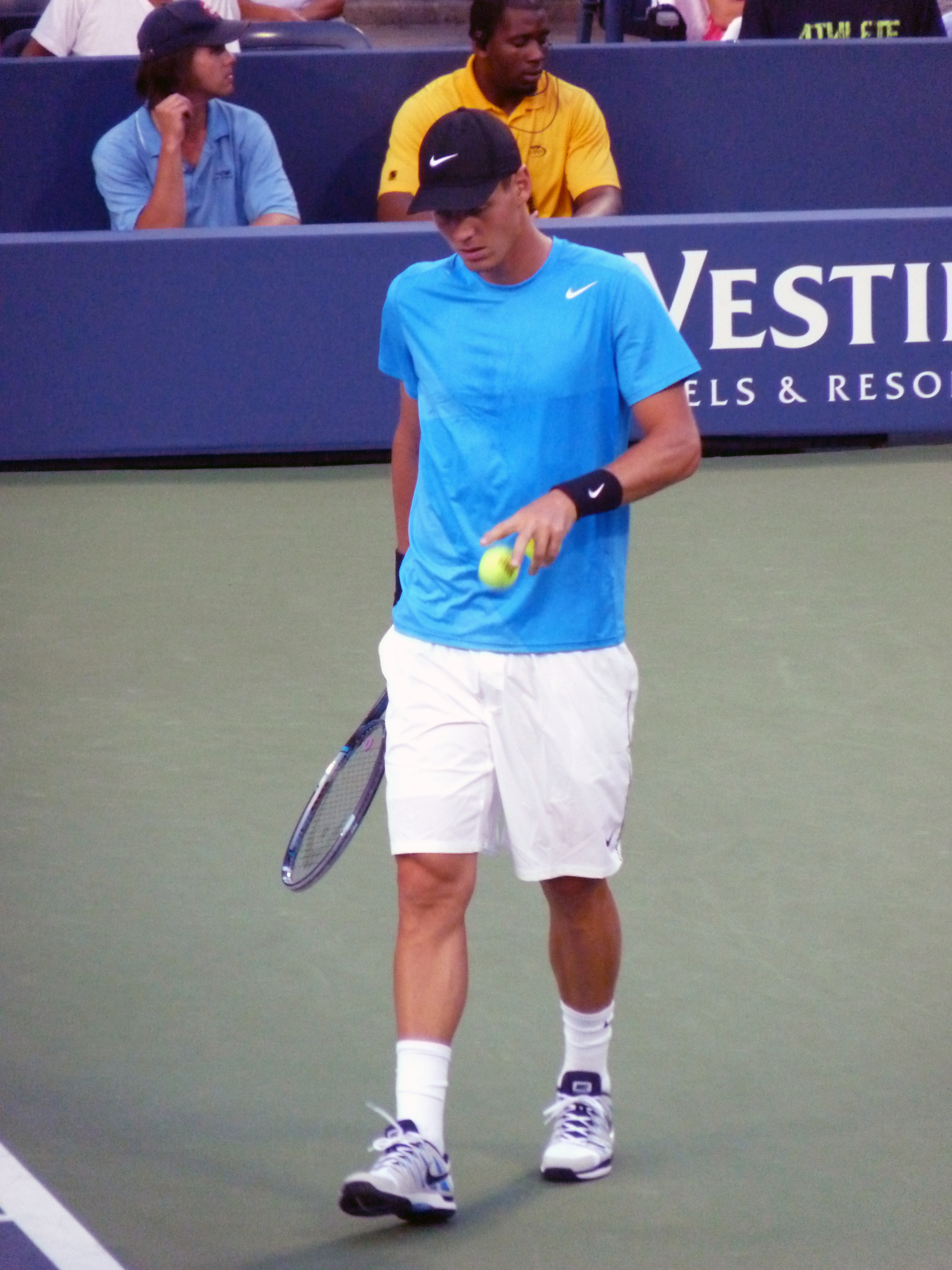
Tomáš Berdych has qualified for the third straight year

On 22 October, after winning the If Stockholm Open, Tomáš Berdych was announced as the sixth qualifier.

Tomáš Berdych began the year by winning the Hopman Cup with Petra Kvitová over France's Marion Bartoli and Richard Gasquet. At the Australian Open, he reached the quarter-finals losing to Rafael Nadal. The following week, he won his first title of the year at the Open Sud de France defeating Gaël Monfils. He reached his first Masters 1000 final in 2 years at the Mutua Madrid Open but lost to Roger Federer. At the French Open he reached the fourth round losing to Juan Martín del Potro. He was then upset by Ernests Gulbis in three tie-break sets at the first round of the Wimbledon. He then reached his second final of the year at the Winston-Salem Open but lost to John Isner. At the US Open he upset world no. 1 Federer in the quarter-finals, but lost to Andy Murray in the semifinals with very windy conditions. He won his second title of the year at the If Stockholm Open defeating Frenchman Jo-Wilfried Tsonga. This is the third consecutive time that Berdych has qualified.

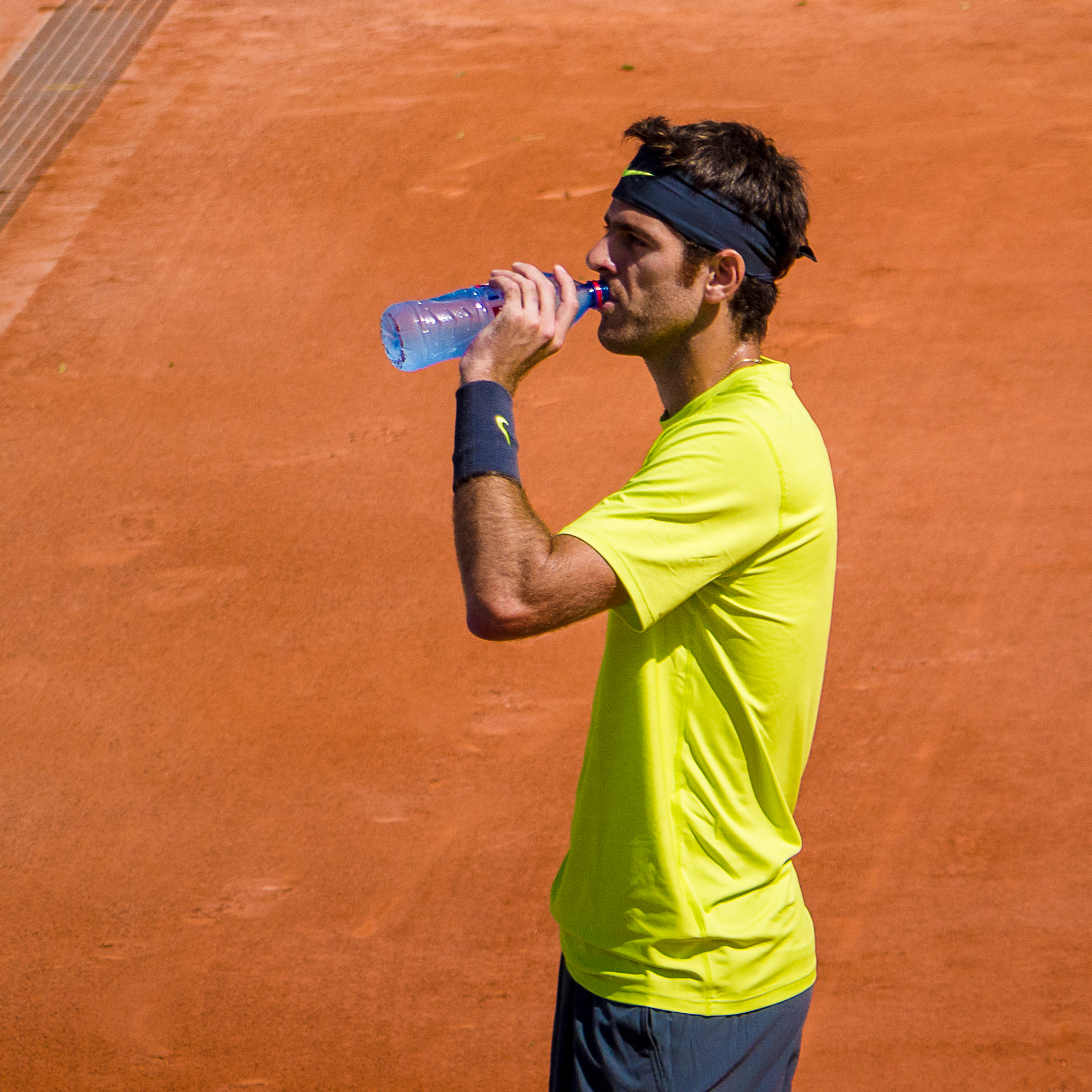
Juan Martín del Potro won four titles in the year.

On 25 October, following the withdrawal of Rafael Nadal, Juan Martín del Potro booked a spot into the event.

Juan Martín del Potro reached the quarter-finals of the first slam of the year in the Australian Open losing to Roger Federer. He then reached his first final of the year at the ABN AMRO World Tennis Tournament losing to Federer once again. However, he bounced back by winning his first title of the year at the Open 13 defeating Michaël Llodra in the final. At the Estoril Open, successfully defended his title by defeating Richard Gasquet . At the French Open he reached the quarter-finals but fell to Federer for the fifth time in the year despite leading two sets to love he lost. At Wimbledon he was handily defeated by David Ferrer in the fourth round. He bounced back at the Olympics winning the Bronze Medal match over Novak Djokovic after losing to Federer in the semifinals. At the US Open he reached his third slam quarter-finals of the year but lost once again this time to Djokovic. He won his third title of the year at the Erste Bank Open defeating qualifier Grega Žemlja in the final. At the Swiss Indoors Basel, Del Potro got his fourth championship of the year after beating Roger Federer. This is the third time del Potro has qualified for the event.

On 1 November, after reaching the quarter-final of the Paris Masters, Jo-Wilfried Tsonga and Janko Tipsarević booked the final two spots of the event.

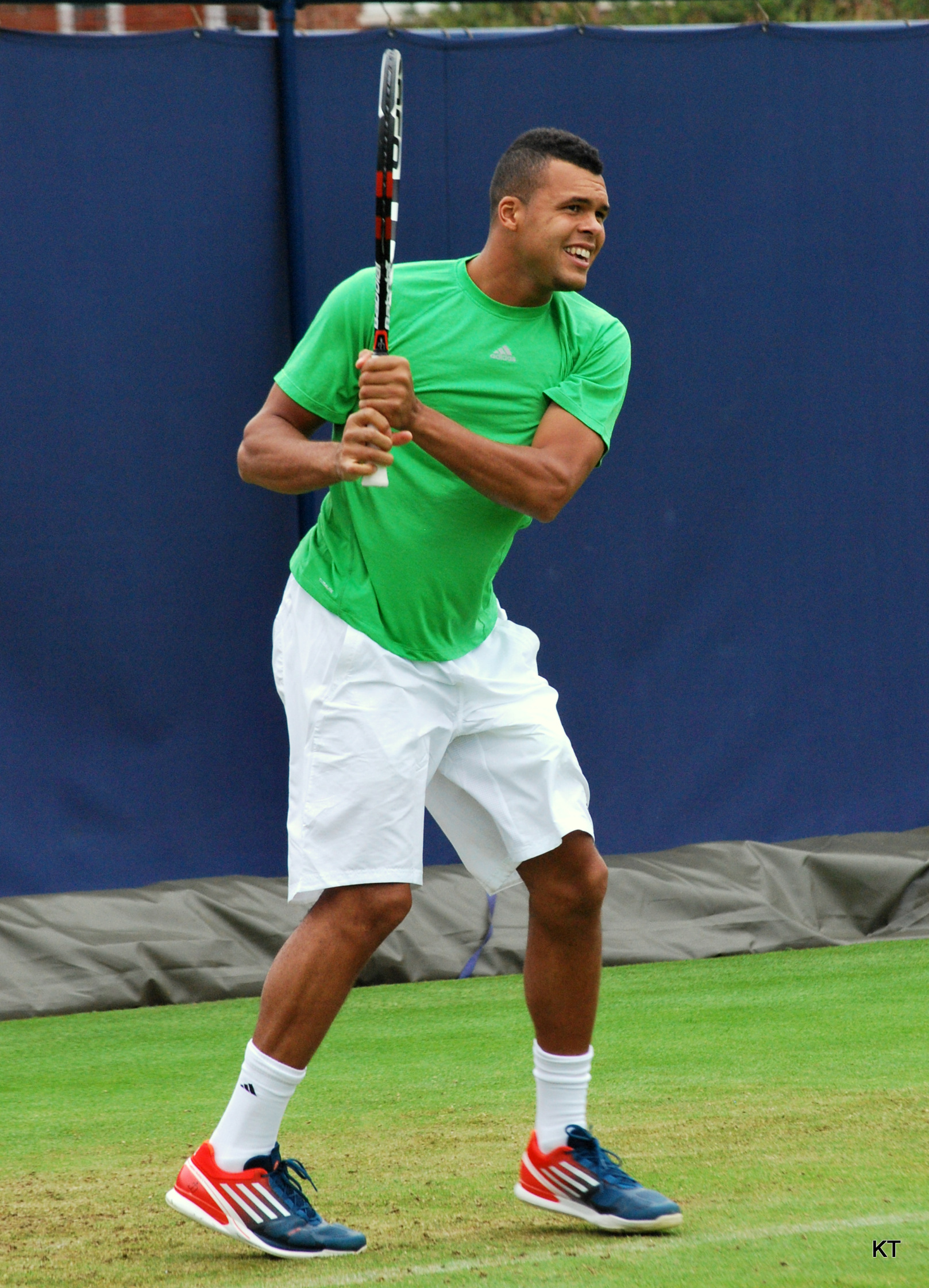
Jo-Wilfried Tsonga won the doubles silver medal at the Olympics

Jo-Wilfried Tsonga began the year well by winning the Qatar Open in an all-French final over Gaël Monfils. At the Australian Open he was upset in the fourth round by Kei Nishikori. At the French Open he lost in the quarter-finals to Novak Djokovic, despite having four match points, two at 5–4 and two at 6–5 in the fourth set. At Wimbledon he reached the semifinals losing to Andy Murray. At the US Open, Tsonga failed to reach the third round of a slam for the first time since 2007, losing to Martin Kližan in the second round. He then bounced back by winning his second title of the year at the Moselle Open over Andreas Seppi. He then reached the final of the China Open losing to Novak Djokovic. He reached his fourth final of the year at the If Stockholm Open losing to Tomáš Berdych. This is the third time that Tsonga has qualified for the event.

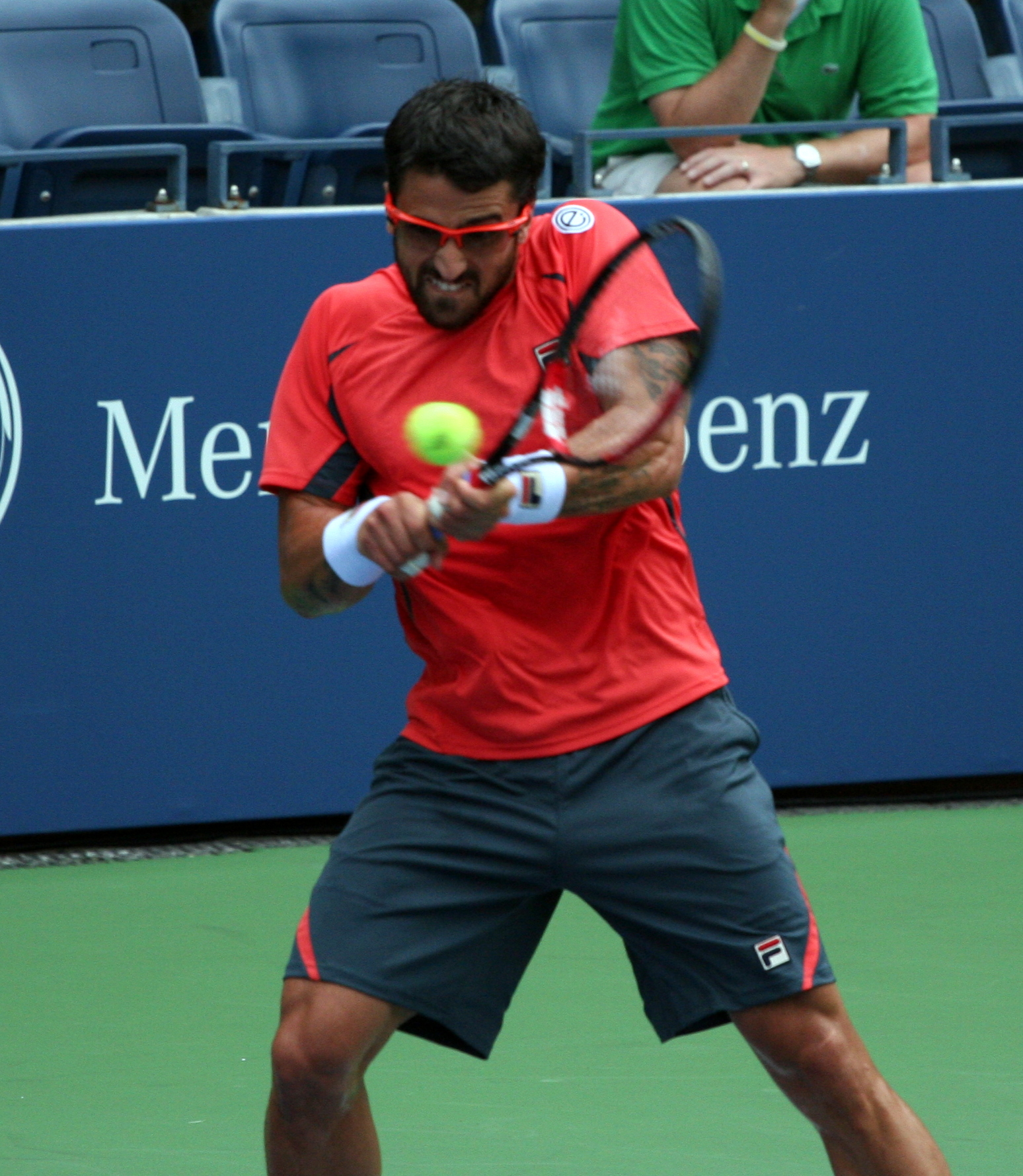
Janko Tipsarević qualifies directly for the first time.

Janko Tipsarević began the year by reaching the final of the Aircel Chennai Open but ended up losing to Milos Raonic in three tie-break sets . At the Australian Open he reached the third round but lost to Richard Gasquet. At the French Open he reached the fourth round and faced Nicolás Almagro but lost in straight sets. At the Wimbledon he was upset in the third round by Mikhail Youzhny losing. The Serb then bounced back by reaching back-to-back finals at the MercedesCup defeating Juan Mónaco in the final to claim his first title of the year and at the Crédit Agricole Suisse Open Gstaad losing to Thomaz Bellucci. At the US Open he reached his second straight quarter-finals at the event but once again lost this time to David Ferrer, despite leading the final set 4–1. This is the first time Tipsarević has qualified for the event after serving as an alternate the previous year.

=== Doubles ===
#	Players	Points	Tours	Date Qualified
1	Bob Bryan (USA); Mike Bryan (USA)	9,485	22	12 August
2	Max Mirnyi (BLR); Daniel Nestor (CAN)	6,675	20	9 August
3	Leander Paes (IND); Radek Štěpánek (CZE)	6,265	12	6 October
4	Robert Lindstedt (SWE); Horia Tecău (ROU)	5,965	23	19 August
5	Mahesh Bhupathi (IND); Rohan Bopanna (IND)	4,455	22	2 November
6	Marcel Granollers (ESP); Marc López (ESP)	4,360	18	22 October
7	Aisam-ul-Haq Qureshi (PAK); Jean-Julien Rojer (NED)	4,115	24	1 November
11	Jonathan Marray (GBR); Frederik Nielsen (DEN)	2,180	6	15 October
Marray and Nielsen qualified due to winning Wimbledon and a top 20 finish according to the rules (P39)

The first team that qualified was the team of Max Mirnyi and Daniel Nestor on 9 August.

Max Mirnyi & Daniel Nestor began the year by winning the Brisbane International over the team of Melzer/Petzschner. They then successfully defended their title at the Regions Morgan Keegan Championships facing the team of Dodig/Melo in the final. At the Sony Ericsson Open they reached their third final of the year only to come up short and lose to the team of Paes/Štěpánek. They then reached their second Masters 1000 final at the Monte-Carlo Rolex Masters losing to the team of Bryan/Bryan. They then successfully defended their title at the French Open, their second slam as a team over the team of Bryan/Bryan. They then claimed their second consecutive title at the Aegon Championships, once again over the American team of Bryan/Bryan. Mirnyi also claimed the mixed doubles gold medal at the Olympics pairing with Victoria Azarenka defeating the British team of Murray/Robson. Nestor on the other hand claimed the title at the Swiss Indoors Basel pairing with Nenad Zimonjić defeating Huey/Inglot.

After winning the Rogers Cup the team of Bob Bryan and Mike Bryan qualified for the event on 12 August.

Bob Bryan & Mike Bryan started the year by winning the Apia International Sydney defeating Ebden/Nieminen in the final. At the Australian Open, as the 3-time defending champion they reached their fourth consecutive final but lost to the team Paes/Štěpánek . They won their 20th Masters title at the Monte-Carlo Rolex Masters by defeating Mirnyi/Nestor. They then reached 3 consecutive finals, the first is in a winning effort at the Open de Nice Côte d'Azur over Marach/Polášek. The second final came in the French Open, where they face Mirnyi/Nestor but ended up in the losing side. They then lost again to Mirnyi/Nestor at the final of the Aegon Championships. At the Summer Olympics, the brothers claimed their first gold medal defeating the French team of Llodra/Tsonga. They then backed it up by winning the Rogers Cup over the Spanish duo of Granollers/López. They then won their 12th slam as a team at the US Open defeating the team of Paes/Štěpánek. This is the most slams won by any team. They then won their 7th title of the year at the China Open over Berlocq/Istomin. Mike Bryan also competed with Lisa Raymond to take the mixed doubles title at Wimbledon over Vesnina/Paes and the bronze medal at the Summer Olympics over the German pairing of Lisicki/Kas.

On 19 August, the team of Robert Lindstedt and Horia Tecău qualified for the event after winning the Western & Southern Open.

Robert Lindstedt & Horia Tecău reached their first final of the year at the ABN AMRO World Tennis Tournament losing to the team of Llodra/Zimonjić in the final. They won their first title of the year at the BRD Năstase Țiriac Trophy over the team of Chardy/Kubot. They reached their first Masters 1000 final of the year at the Mutua Madrid Open but lost to Fyrstenberg/Matkowski. They then won their second title at the UNICEF Open over the team of Cabal/Tursunov. For the third straight year, they were able to reach the final of the Wimbledon but for the third straight year finished as runner-up, this time losing to the wild carded team of Marray/Nielsen. They bounced back by winning Lindstedt's home tournament at the SkiStar Swedish Open for the third straight time defeating the pairing Peya/Soares. They won their biggest title of the year at the Western & Southern Open a Masters 1000 event defeating the Indian pairing of Bhupathi/Bopanna in the final. Lindstedt also teamed up with Nenad Zimonjić at the If Stockholm Open and reached the final just to lose to Melo/Soares. Tecau also paired up with Bethanie Mattek-Sands to win the mixed doubles at the Australian Open over the team of Vesnina/Paes.

On 6 October, after reaching the final of the Rakuten Japan Open Tennis Championships, the team of India's Leander Paes and Radek Štěpánek were announced as the fourth qualifiers.

Leander Paes & Radek Štěpánek began the year by winning the first slam of the year at the Australian Open defeating the team of Bryan/Bryan, the defending champion. They then claimed their second title at the Sony Ericsson Open defeating the pairing of Mirnyi/Nestor in the final. They then reached their second slam final of the year at the US Open, once again against the team of Bryan/Bryan in the final but this time they lost. The Indian-Czech reached back-to-back finals at the China Open losing to the team of Peya/Soares and the final of the Shanghai Rolex Masters defeating the Indian pairing of Bhupathi/Bopanna. Paes also won another title pairing with Janko Tipsarević defeating the Israel duo of Erlich/Ram at the Aircel Chennai Open. Paes also reached the final of two mixed doubles slam with Elena Vesnina but end up losing in both, at the Australian Open to Mattek-Sands/Tecău and at Wimbledon to Raymond/Bryan.

On 15 October, after securing their position in the top 20, Wimbledon champions Britain's Jonathan Marray and Denmark's Frederik Nielsen qualified for the event.

Jonathan Marray & Frederik Nielsen made a breakthrough winning their only title at Wimbledon defeating three-time Wimbledon finalists Lindstedt/Tecău. This win marked the first time that a British player had won a doubles slam in 76 years and Nielsen was the first Dane to win a Wimbledon Championship title. It was also the first time since 1998 that a doubles final went to 5 sets. Nielsen also reached the final of Moselle Open teaming up with Johan Brunström losing Mahut/Roger-Vasselin.

On 22 October, the Spanish team of Marcel Granollers and Marc López became the sixth qualifiers.

Marcel Granollers & Marc López reached their first final at the Abierto Mexicano Telcel in an all-Spanish final against Marrero/Verdasco but lost. They again finished runners-up at the Barcelona Open BancSabadell losing to the Polish team of Fyrstenberg/Matkowski. They won their first title at the Internazionali BNL d'Italia defeating the team of Kubot/Tipsarević. They then reached back-to-back finals at the ATP Vegeta Croatia Open Umag losing to the Spanish pairing of Marrero/Verdasco and the final of the Crédit Agricole Suisse Open Gstaad defeating the Colombian team of Farah/Giraldo. They then reached their first hard court final at the Rogers Cup facing Bryan/Bryan, but lost. Lopez also paired with Rafael Nadal to claim the BNP Paribas Open over the American pairing of Isner/Querrey.

On 1 November, after reaching the quarterfinals of the BNP Paribas Masters, Aisam-ul-Haq Qureshi and Jean-Julien Rojer claimed one of the two remaining spots.

Aisam-ul-Haq Qureshi & Jean-Julien Rojer claimed their first title at the Estoril Open defeating the Austrian-Spanish team of Knowle/Marrero. They won their second title in the grass courts of Gerry Weber Open defeating Huey/Lipsky in the final. They reached their biggest final of the year at the BNP Paribas Masters losing to the Indian duo of Bhupathi/Bopanna.

On 2 November, after defeating the team of Mariusz Fyrstenberg and Marcin Matkowski, the Indian team of Mahesh Bhupathi and Rohan Bopanna booked the final spot.

Mahesh Bhupathi & Rohan Bopanna claimed their first title of the year at the Dubai Duty Free Tennis Championships defeating the Polish team of Fyrstenberg/Matkowski. They reached their second final of the year at the Western & Southern Open but lost to Lindstedt/Tecău. At the Shanghai Rolex Masters they faced the team of Paes/Štěpánek in the final but lost. They then won their biggest title of the year at the BNP Paribas Masters defeating the pairing of Qureshi/Rojer. Bhupathi also teamed up with Sania Mirza to win the French Open Mixed doubles title over the team Jans-Ignacik/González.

== Groupings ==
=== Singles ===
Group A:

- (Serbia) Novak Djokovic
- (United Kingdom) Andy Murray
- (Czech Republic) Tomáš Berdych
- (France) Jo-Wilfried Tsonga

Group B:

- (Switzerland) Roger Federer
- (Spain) David Ferrer
- (Argentina) Juan Martín del Potro
- (Serbia) Janko Tipsarević

=== Doubles ===
Group A:

- (United States) Bob Bryan & (United States) Mike Bryan
- (India) Leander Paes & (Czech Republic) Radek Štěpánek
- (Spain) Marcel Granollers & (Spain) Marc López
- (Pakistan) Aisam-ul-Haq Qureshi & (Netherlands) Jean-Julien Rojer

Group B:

- (Belarus) Max Mirnyi & (Canada) Daniel Nestor
- (Sweden) Robert Lindstedt & (Romania) Horia Tecău
- (India) Mahesh Bhupathi & (India) Rohan Bopanna
- (United Kingdom) Jonathan Marray & (Denmark) Frederik Nielsen

== Head-to-head ==
=== Singles ===
		Djokovic	Federer	Murray	Ferrer	Berdych	del Potro	Tsonga	Tipsarević	Overall	YTD W–L
1	(Serbia) Novak Djokovic		12–16	9–7	9–5	10–1	6–2	8–5	5–2	59–38	70–12
2	(Switzerland) Roger Federer	16–12		8–10	13–0	11–5	13–3	8–3	5–0	74–33	68–10
3	(United Kingdom) Andy Murray	7–9	10–8		6–5	3–4	5–1	6–1	5–3	42–31	54–14
4	(Spain) David Ferrer	5–9	0–13	5–6		5–3	5–2	2–1	3–1	25–35	72–14
5	(Czech Republic) Tomáš Berdych	1–10	5–11	4–3	3–5		2–4	3–1	3–5	21–39	59–20
6	(Argentina) Juan Martín del Potro	2–6	3–13	1–5	2–5	4–2		5–2	3–0	20–33	63–15
7	(France) Jo-Wilfried Tsonga	5–8	3–8	1–6	1–2	1–3	2–5		0–0	13–32	55–22
8	(Serbia) Janko Tipsarević	2–5	0–5	3–5	1–3	5–3	0–3	0–0		11–24	57–25

=== Doubles ===
		Bryan; Bryan	Mirnyi; Nestor	Paes; Štěpánek	Lindstedt; Tecău	Granollers; López	Qureshi; Rojer	Bhupathi; Bopanna	Marray; Nielsen	Overall	YTD W–L
1	(United States) Bob Bryan / (United States) Mike Bryan		2–3	4–2	3–1	3–0	5–1	0–0	0–1	17–8	60–13
2	(Belarus) Max Mirnyi / (Canada) Daniel Nestor	3–2		1–2	5–1	0–2	0–1	2–2	0–0	11–10	42–16
3	(India) Leander Paes / (Czech Republic) Radek Štěpánek	2–4	2–1		0–0	1–0	0–0	1–0	0–0	6–5	30–9
4	(Sweden) Robert Lindstedt / (Romania) Horia Tecău	1–3	1–5	0–0		3–2	1–0	2–0	0–1	8–11	44–19
5	(Spain) Marcel Granollers / (Spain) Marc López	0–3	2–0	0–1	2–3		1–0	1–0	0–1	6–8	36–15
6	(Pakistan) Aisam-ul-Haq Qureshi / (Netherlands) Jean-Julien Rojer	1–5	1–0	0–0	0–1	0–1		0–1	0–1	2–9	36–21
7	(India) Mahesh Bhupathi / (India) Rohan Bopanna	0–0	2–2	0–1	0–2	0–1	1–0		0–0	3–6	30–20
8	(United Kingdom) Jonathan Marray / (Denmark) Frederik Nielsen	1–0	0–0	0–0	1–0	1–0	1–0	0–0		4–0	8–4

== Day-by-day summary ==
=== Day 1 (5 November) ===
Matches on O_{2} arena
Group	Winner	Loser	Score
Doubles – Group B	(Belarus) Max Mirnyi (Canada) Daniel Nestor [2]	(Sweden) Robert Lindstedt (Romania) Horia Tecău [4]	4–6, 7–6^{(7–1)}, [12–10]
Singles – Group A	(United Kingdom) Andy Murray [3]	(Czech Republic) Tomáš Berdych [5]	3–6, 6–3, 6–4
Doubles – Group A	(Spain) Marcel Granollers (Spain) Marc López [6]	(United States) Bob Bryan (United States) Mike Bryan [1]	7–5, 5–7, [11–9]
Singles – Group A	(Serbia) Novak Djokovic [1]	(France) Jo-Wilfried Tsonga [7]	7–6^{(7–4)}, 6–3

=== Day 2 (6 November) ===
Matches on O_{2} arena
Group	Winner	Loser	Score
Doubles – Group B	(United Kingdom) Jonathan Marray (Denmark) Frederik Nielsen [8]	(India) Mahesh Bhupathi (India) Rohan Bopanna [5]	6–4, 6–7^{(1–7)}, [12–10]
Singles – Group B	(Switzerland) Roger Federer [2]	(Serbia) Janko Tipsarević [8]	6–3, 6–1
Doubles – Group A	(India) Leander Paes (Czech Republic) Radek Štěpánek [3]	(Pakistan) Aisam-ul-Haq Qureshi (Netherlands) Jean-Julien Rojer [7]	6–4, 7–5
Singles – Group B	(Spain) David Ferrer [4]	(Argentina) Juan Martín del Potro [6]	6–3, 3–6, 6–4

=== Day 3 (7 November) ===
Matches on O_{2} arena
Group	Winner	Loser	Score
Doubles – Group B	(India) Mahesh Bhupathi (India) Rohan Bopanna [5]	(Sweden) Robert Lindstedt (Romania) Horia Tecău [4]	6–3, 5–7, [10–5]
Singles – Group A	(Serbia) Novak Djokovic [1]	(United Kingdom) Andy Murray [3]	4–6, 6–3, 7–5
Doubles – Group B	(United Kingdom) Jonathan Marray (Denmark) Frederik Nielsen [8]	(Belarus) Max Mirnyi (Canada) Daniel Nestor [2]	7–6^{(7–3)}, 4–6, [12–10]
Singles – Group A	(Czech Republic) Tomáš Berdych [5]	(France) Jo-Wilfried Tsonga [7]	7–5, 3–6, 6–1

=== Day 4 (8 November) ===
Matches on O_{2} arena
Group	Winner	Loser	Score
Doubles – Group A	(India) Leander Paes (Czech Republic) Radek Štěpánek [3]	(Spain) Marcel Granollers (Spain) Marc López [6]	7–5, 6–4
Singles – Group B	(Switzerland) Roger Federer [2]	(Spain) David Ferrer [4]	6–4, 7–6^{(7–5)}
Doubles – Group A	(United States) Bob Bryan (United States) Mike Bryan [1]	(Pakistan) Aisam-ul-Haq Qureshi (Netherlands) Jean-Julien Rojer [7]	7–5, 6–4
Singles – Group B	(Argentina) Juan Martín del Potro [6]	(Serbia) Janko Tipsarević [8]	6–0, 6–4

=== Day 5 (9 November) ===
Matches on O_{2} arena
Group	Winner	Loser	Score
Doubles – Group B	(India) Mahesh Bhupathi (India) Rohan Bopanna [5]	(Belarus) Max Mirnyi (Canada) Daniel Nestor [2]	7–6^{(7–5)}, 6–7^{(5–7)}, [10–5]
Singles – Group A	(Serbia) Novak Djokovic [1]	(Czech Republic) Tomáš Berdych [5]	6–2, 7–6^{(8–6)}
Doubles – Group B	(Sweden) Robert Lindstedt (Romania) Horia Tecău [4]	(United Kingdom) Jonathan Marray (Denmark) Frederik Nielsen [8]	6–3, 7–5
Singles – Group A	(United Kingdom) Andy Murray [3]	(France) Jo-Wilfried Tsonga [7]	6–2, 7–6^{(7–3)}

=== Day 6 (10 November) ===
Matches on O_{2} arena
Group	Winner	Loser	Score
Doubles – Group A	(India) Leander Paes (Czech Republic) Radek Štěpánek [3]	(United States) Bob Bryan (United States) Mike Bryan [1]	6–4, 6–7^{(6–8)}, [10–7]
Singles – Group B	(Argentina) Juan Martín del Potro [6]	(Switzerland) Roger Federer [2]	7–6^{(7–3)}, 4–6, 6–3
Doubles – Group A	(Spain) Marcel Granollers (Spain) Marc López [6]	(Pakistan) Aisam-ul-Haq Qureshi (Netherlands) Jean-Julien Rojer [7]	6–4, 6–2
Singles – Group B	(Spain) David Ferrer [4]	(Serbia) Janko Tipsarević [8]	4–6, 6–3, 6–1

=== Day 7 (11 November) ===
Matches on O_{2} arena
Group	Winner	Loser	Score
Doubles – Semifinals	(India) Mahesh Bhupathi (India) Rohan Bopanna [5]	(India) Leander Paes (Czech Republic) Radek Štěpánek [3]	4–6, 6–1, [12–10]
Singles – Semifinals	(Serbia) Novak Djokovic [1]	(Argentina) Juan Martín del Potro [6]	4–6, 6–3, 6–2
Doubles – Semifinals	(Spain) Marcel Granollers (Spain) Marc López [6]	(United Kingdom) Jonathan Marray (Denmark) Frederik Nielsen [8]	6–4, 6–3
Singles – Semifinals	(Switzerland) Roger Federer [2]	(United Kingdom) Andy Murray [3]	7–6^{(7–5)}, 6–2

=== Day 8 (12 November) ===
Matches on O_{2} arena
Group	Winner	Loser	Score
Doubles – Final	(Spain) Marcel Granollers (Spain) Marc López [6]	(India) Mahesh Bhupathi (India) Rohan Bopanna [5]	7–5, 3–6, [10–3]
Singles – Final	(Serbia) Novak Djokovic [1]	(Switzerland) Roger Federer [2]	7–6^{(8–6)}, 7–5

== See also ==
- ATP points system
- 2012 WTA Tour Championships
- 2012 ATP Challenger Tour Finals
