= Fernando Vicente =

Spanish tennis coach and player (born 1957)

- Country (sports): Spain
- Residence: Andorra
- Born: 8 March 1977 (age 48); Benicarló, Spain
- Height: 1.80 m (5 ft 11 in)
- Turned pro: 1996
- Retired: 2011
- Plays: Right-handed (one-handed backhand)
- Prize money: $2,917,616

Singles
- Career record: 157–213
- Career titles: 3
- Highest ranking: No. 29 (12 June 2000)

Grand Slam singles results
- Australian Open: 3R (2000, 2003)
- French Open: 4R (2000)
- Wimbledon: 2R (1999)
- US Open: 3R (2002)

Other tournaments
- Olympic Games: 2R (2000)

Doubles
- Career record: 44–59
- Career titles: 2
- Highest ranking: No. 61 (27 November 2006)

Grand Slam doubles results
- Australian Open: 2R (2006)
- French Open: 1R (2003, 2006)
- Wimbledon: 1R (2003, 2006)
- US Open: 2R (2006)

Coaching career (2010–)
- Marcel Granollers & Marc López (2010—2014); Andrey Rublev (2017–)

Coaching achievements
- Coachee singles titles total: 19
- Coachee(s) doubles titles total: 12
- List of notable tournaments (with champion) Singles: 1x ATP 500 Title (Valencia), 2x ATP 250 Titles (Gstaad and Kitzbühel) [ — Granollers]; 2x ATP Masters 1000 Titles (Monte Carlo and Madrid), 5x ATP 500 Titles (Hamburg, St. Petersburg, Vienna, Rotterdam and Dubai), 9x ATP 250 Titles (Umag, Moscow, Doha, Adelaide, Marseille, Belgrade, Gijón, Båstad and Hong Kong) [ — Rublev] Doubles: 2010 — Chennai (Granollers, with Ventura), Costa do Sauípe (Granollers, with Cuevas), 2011 — Auckland (Granollers, with Robredo), Doha, 2012 — Indian Wells (Masters 1000: López, with Nadal), Rome, Gstaad, ATP Finals, 2014 — Buenos Aires (Granollers & López); 2021 — Doha (Rublev, with Karatsev), 2022 — Marseille (Rublev, with Molchanov), 2023 — Madrid (Masters 1000: Rublev, with Khachanov) Mixed doubles: 2021 — Olympics (Rublev, with Pavlyuchenkova) Team: 2011 — Davis Cup (Granollers, Spain Davis Cup team); 2021 — ATP Cup (Rublev, Russia), Laver Cup (Rublev, Europe), Davis Cup (Rublev, Russia Davis Cup team)

Coaching awards and records
- Awards 2020 ATP Coach of the Year
- Last updated on: 10 May 2024.

Fernando Vicente Fibla (Spanish pronunciation: [feɾˈnando βiˈθente ˈfiβla]; (Note: In isolation, Vicente is pronounced [biˈθente].) born 8 March 1977) is a professional tennis coach and a former player from Spain, who turned professional in 1996. He reached his career-high ATP ranking of world No. 29 in June 2000, winning three singles titles and reaching the quarterfinals of the 1998 Rome Masters and the 2000 Cincinnati Masters.

He is the coach of Andrey Rublev since 2017, having previously coached Marcel Granollers and Marc López from 2010 to 2014.

== Career finals ==
=== Singles: 6 (3–3) ===
Legend Grand Slam (0–0) Tennis Masters Cup (0–0) ATP Masters Series (0–0) ATP Championship Series (0–1) ATP Tour (3–2)	Finals by surface Hard (0–0) Clay (3–3) Grass (0–0) Carpet (0–0)

Result	W/L	Date	Tournament	Surface	Opponent	Score
Loss	0–1	Mar 1999	Casablanca, Morocco	Clay	(Spain) Alberto Martín	3–6, 4–6
Win	1–1	Jun 1999	Merano, Italy	Clay	(Morocco) Hicham Arazi	6–2, 3–6, 7–6^{(7–1)}
Loss	1–2	Jul 1999	Kitzbühel, Austria	Clay	(Spain) Albert Costa	5–7, 2–6, 7–6^{(7–5)}, 6–7^{(4–7)}
Win	2–2	Apr 2000	Casablanca, Morocco	Clay	(France) Sébastien Grosjean	6–4, 4–6, 7–6^{(7–3)}
Win	3–2	Jan 2001	Bogotá, Colombia	Clay	(Argentina) Juan Ignacio Chela	6–4, 7–6^{(8–6)}
Loss	3–3	May 2002	St. Pölten, Austria	Clay	(Ecuador) Nicolás Lapentti	5–7, 4–6

=== Doubles: 6 (2–4) ===
Legend Grand Slam (0–0) Tennis Masters Cup (0–0) ATP Masters Series (0–0) ATP Championship Series (0–2) ATP Tour (2–2)	Finals by surface Hard (0–0) Clay (2–4) Grass (0–0) Carpet (0–0)

Result	W/L	Date	Tournament	Surface	Partner	Opponents	Score
Loss	0–1	May 2000	Mallorca, Spain	Clay	(Spain) Alberto Martín	(France) Michaël Llodra (Italy) Diego Nargiso	6–7^{(2–7)}, 6–7^{(3–7)}
Loss	0–2	Apr 2001	Barcelona, Spain	Clay	(Spain) Tommy Robredo	(United States) Donald Johnson (United States) Jared Palmer	6–7^{(2–7)}, 4–6
Loss	0–3	Jul 2002	Umag, Croatia	Clay	(Spain) Albert Portas	(Czech Republic) František Čermák (Austria) Julian Knowle	4–6, 4–6
Loss	0–4	Feb 2003	Acapulco, Mexico	Clay	(Spain) David Ferrer	(The Bahamas) Mark Knowles (Canada) Daniel Nestor	3–6, 3–6
Win	1–4	May 2004	Casablanca, Morocco	Clay	(Italy) Enzo Artoni	(Switzerland) Yves Allegro (Germany) Michael Kohlmann	3–6, 6–0, 6–4
Win	2–4	Jul 2006	Amersfoort, Netherlands	Clay	(Spain) Alberto Martín	(Argentina) Lucas Arnold Ker (Germany) Christopher Kas	6–4, 6–3

== Notes ==
Awards and achievements
Preceded by (France) Gilles Cervara	ATP Coach of the Year; 2020	Succeeded by (Argentina) Facundo Lugones
