= 2012 Monte-Carlo Rolex Masters – Doubles =

Doubles
- 2012 Monte-Carlo Rolex Masters

Final
- Champions: (United States) Bob Bryan (United States) Mike Bryan
- Runners-up: (Belarus) Max Mirnyi (Canada) Daniel Nestor
- Score: 6–2, 6–3

Events
Singles	Doubles
← 2011 ·	Monte-Carlo Rolex Masters	· 2013 →

Bob and Mike Bryan successfully defended their title beating Max Mirnyi and Daniel Nestor 6–2, 6–3 in the final.

== Seeds ==
All seeds received a bye into the second round.

1. (United States) Bob Bryan / (United States) Mike Bryan (champions)
2. (Belarus) Max Mirnyi / (Canada) Daniel Nestor (final)
3. (France) Michaël Llodra / (Serbia) Nenad Zimonjić (semifinals)
4. (Poland) Mariusz Fyrstenberg / (Poland) Marcin Matkowski (second round)
5. (India) Leander Paes / (Czech Republic) Radek Štěpánek (quarterfinals)
6. (India) Mahesh Bhupathi / (India) Rohan Bopanna (second round)
7. (Sweden) Robert Lindstedt / (Romania) Horia Tecău (second round)
8. (Czech Republic) František Čermák / (Slovakia) Filip Polášek (second round)

== Draw ==
=== Key ===
- Q = Qualifier
- WC = Wild card
- LL = Lucky loser
- Alt = Alternate
- SE = Special exempt
- PR = Protected ranking
- ITF = ITF entry
- JE = Junior exempt
- w/o = Walkover
- r = Retired
- d = Defaulted
- SR = Special ranking

=== Finals ===
Semifinals
1	(United States) Bob Bryan (United States) Mike Bryan	6	7^{7}
(Spain) Marcel Granollers (Spain) Marc López	4	6^{5}
3	(France) Michaël Llodra (Serbia) Nenad Zimonjić	6	4	[5]
2	(Belarus) Max Mirnyi (Canada) Daniel Nestor	4	6	[10]

Final
1	(United States) Bob Bryan (United States) Mike Bryan	6	6
2	(Belarus) Max Mirnyi (Canada) Daniel Nestor	2	3

=== Top half ===
First round
(Mexico) S González (Germany) C Kas	4	3
(United Kingdom) A Murray (United Kingdom) J Murray	6	6
(Colombia) JS Cabal (Argentina) E Schwank	6^{3}	7^{7}	[10]
(France) J Benneteau (France) J-W Tsonga	7^{7}	6^{3}	[4]
(Germany) F Mayer (Austria) J Melzer	7	6
WC	(France) A Clément (Monaco) J-R Lisnard	5	4
(Spain) M Granollers (Spain) M López	6	6
(Pakistan) A-u-H Qureshi (Netherlands) J-J Rojer	4	4

Second round
1	(United States) B Bryan (United States) M Bryan	7	6
(United Kingdom) A Murray (United Kingdom) J Murray	5	4
(Colombia) JS Cabal (Argentina) E Schwank	3	3
5	(India) L Paes (Czech Republic) R Štěpánek	6	6
4	(Poland) M Fyrstenberg (Poland) M Matkowski	4	4
(Germany) F Mayer (Austria) J Melzer	6	6
(Spain) M Granollers (Spain) M López	7	6
7	(Sweden) R Lindstedt (Romania) H Tecău	5	3

Quarterfinals
1	(United States) B Bryan (United States) M Bryan	6	6
5	(India) L Paes (Czech Republic) R Štěpánek	2	0
(Germany) F Mayer (Austria) J Melzer	0	1
(Spain) M Granollers (Spain) M López	6	6

Semifinals
1	(United States) B Bryan (United States) M Bryan	7^{7}	6
(Spain) M Granollers (Spain) M López	6^{5}	4

=== Bottom half ===
First round
(Austria) O Marach (Austria) A Peya	6	3	[12]
(United States) E Butorac (Brazil) B Soares	2	6	[10]
(Czech Republic) T Berdych (Ukraine) A Dolgopolov	5	2
(Spain) D Marrero (Spain) F Verdasco	7	6
WC	(Italy) S Bolelli (Italy) F Fognini	6^{4}	4
(Serbia) V Troicki (Switzerland) S Wawrinka	7^{7}	6
Alt	(Croatia) M Čilić (Brazil) M Melo	7^{7}	6
Alt	(France) É Roger-Vasselin (France) G Simon	6^{5}	4

Second round
8	(Czech Republic) F Čermák (Slovakia) F Polášek	6^{4}	3
(Austria) O Marach (Austria) A Peya	7^{7}	6
(Spain) D Marrero (Spain) F Verdasco	6^{2}	6	[9]
3	(France) M Llodra (Serbia) N Zimonjić	7^{7}	3	[11]
6	(India) M Bhupathi (India) R Bopanna	4	4
(Serbia) V Troicki (Switzerland) S Wawrinka	6	6
Alt	(Croatia) M Čilić (Brazil) M Melo	6^{6}	6	[5]
2	(Belarus) M Mirnyi (Canada) D Nestor	7^{8}	3	[10]

Quarterfinals
(Austria) O Marach (Austria) A Peya	2	1
3	(France) M Llodra (Serbia) N Zimonjić	6	6
(Serbia) V Troicki (Switzerland) S Wawrinka	4	5
2	(Belarus) M Mirnyi (Canada) D Nestor	6	7

Semifinals
3	(France) M Llodra (Serbia) N Zimonjić	6	4	[5]
2	(Belarus) M Mirnyi (Canada) D Nestor	4	6	[10]
