= 2012 Monte-Carlo Rolex Masters – Singles =

Singles
- 2012 Monte-Carlo Rolex Masters

Final
- Champion: (Spain) Rafael Nadal
- Runner-up: (Serbia) Novak Djokovic
- Score: 6–3, 6–1

Details
- Draw: 56 (7Q / 4WC)
- Seeds: 16

Events
| Singles | Doubles |
- Monte-Carlo Rolex Masters

Seven-time defending champion Rafael Nadal defeated Novak Djokovic in the final, 6–3, 6–1 to win the singles tennis title at the 2012 Monte-Carlo Masters. Nadal became the first man in the Open Era to win a tournament eight consecutive times. He did not lose a set during the tournament, and his win over Djokovic in the final was his record-extending 42nd consecutive match win at the Monte-Carlo Masters.

This tournament marked the final professional appearance of former world No. 3 and 2010 Indian Wells champion Ivan Ljubičić; he lost in the first round to Ivan Dodig.

== Seeds ==
Top 8 seeds received a bye into the second round.

1. (Serbia) Novak Djokovic (final)
2. (Spain) Rafael Nadal (champion)
3. (United Kingdom) Andy Murray (quarterfinals)
4. (France) Jo-Wilfried Tsonga (quarterfinals)
5. (Spain) David Ferrer (second round)
6. (Czech Republic) Tomáš Berdych (semifinals)
7. (Serbia) Janko Tipsarević (third round)
8. (Spain) Nicolás Almagro (third round)
9. (France) Gilles Simon (semifinals)
10. (Spain) Feliciano López (first round)
11. (Argentina) Juan Mónaco (first round, retired because of a right ankle injury)
12. (Japan) Kei Nishikori (third round)
13. (Spain) Fernando Verdasco (third round)
14. (Germany) Florian Mayer (first round)
15. (Austria) Jürgen Melzer (second round)
16. (Ukraine) Alexandr Dolgopolov (third round)

== Draw ==
Key

- Q = Qualifier
- WC = Wild card
- LL = Lucky loser
- Alt = Alternate
- ITF = ITF entry
- PR = Protected ranking
- SR = Special ranking
- SE = Special exempt
- JE = Junior exempt
- JR = Junior Accelerator Programme entrant
- CO = College Accelerator Programme entrant
- NG = Next Gen Accelerator Program entrant
- w/o = Walkover
- r = Retired
- d = Defaulted

=== Finals ===
Quarterfinals
1 | (Serbia) Novak Djokovic | 6 | 6
(Netherlands) Robin Haase | 4 | 2
3 | (United Kingdom) Andy Murray | 7^{7} | 2 | 3
6 | (Czech Republic) Tomáš Berdych | 6^{4} | 6 | 6
9 | (France) Gilles Simon | 7 | 6
4 | (France) Jo-Wilfried Tsonga | 5 | 4
(Switzerland) Stan Wawrinka | 5 | 4
2 | (Spain) Rafael Nadal | 7 | 6

Semifinals
1 | (Serbia) Novak Djokovic | 4 | 6 | 6
6 | (Czech Republic) Tomáš Berdych | 6 | 3 | 2
9 | (France) Gilles Simon | 3 | 4
2 | (Spain) Rafael Nadal | 6 | 6

Final
1 | (Serbia) Novak Djokovic | 3 | 1
2 | (Spain) Rafael Nadal | 6 | 6

=== Top half ===
==== Section 1 ====
First round
Q | (Romania) V Hănescu | 3 | 1
(Italy) A Seppi | 6 | 6
(Australia) B Tomic | 6 | 6
(Uzbekistan) D Istomin | 4 | 3
(Argentina) JI Chela | 2 | 2
16 | (Ukraine) A Dolgopolov | 6 | 6
11 | (Argentina) J Mónaco | 5 | 6 | 3^{r}
(Netherlands) R Haase | 7 | 0 | 2
(France) M Llodra | 5 | 3
(Italy) F Fognini | 7 | 6
(Brazil) T Bellucci | 6 | 6
(South Africa) K Anderson | 4 | 4

Second round
1 | (Serbia) N Djokovic | 6 | 6
(Italy) A Seppi | 1 | 4
(Australia) B Tomic | 2 | 7 | 1
16 | (Ukraine) A Dolgopolov | 6 | 5 | 6
(Netherlands) R Haase | 6 | 6
(Italy) F Fognini | 4 | 4
(Brazil) T Bellucci | 6 | 6
5 | (Spain) D Ferrer | 3 | 2

Third round
1 | (Serbia) N Djokovic | 2 | 6 | 6
16 | (Ukraine) A Dolgopolov | 6 | 1 | 4
(Netherlands) R Haase | 6 | 6
(Brazil) T Bellucci | 2 | 3

Quarterfinals
1 | (Serbia) N Djokovic | 6 | 6
(Netherlands) R Haase | 4 | 2

==== Section 2 ====
First round
(Serbia) V Troicki | 6 | 6
WC | (Monaco) J-R Lisnard | 3 | 1
(France) J Benneteau | 6 | 3 | 6
(Spain) M Granollers | 3 | 6 | 2
(Poland) Ł Kubot | 2 | 5
15 | (Austria) J Melzer | 6 | 7
12 | (Japan) K Nishikori | 6 | 7
(Spain) A Ramos | 2 | 5
(United States) D Young | 0 | 1
WC | (France) P-H Mathieu | 6 | 6
Q | (Italy) S Bolelli | 3 | 4
(Croatia) M Čilić | 6 | 6

Second round
3 | (United Kingdom) A Murray | 6 | 6
(Serbia) V Troicki | 0 | 3
(France) J Benneteau | 6 | 6
15 | (Austria) J Melzer | 4 | 3
12 | (Japan) K Nishikori | 6 | 6
WC | (France) P-H Mathieu | 4 | 2
(Croatia) M Čilić | 6^{3} | 1
6 | (Czech Republic) T Berdych | 7^{7} | 6

Third round
3 | (United Kingdom) A Murray | 6
(France) J Benneteau | 5^{r}
12 | (Japan) K Nishikori | 6 | 2 | 4
6 | (Czech Republic) T Berdych | 2 | 6 | 6

Quarterfinals
3 | (United Kingdom) A Murray | 7^{7} | 2 | 3
6 | (Czech Republic) T Berdych | 6^{4} | 6 | 6

=== Bottom half ===
==== Section 3 ====
First round
(Canada) M Raonic | 2 | 6 | 3
(Spain) A Montañés | 6 | 3 | 6
(Russia) M Youzhny | 1 | 3
Q | (Portugal) F Gil | 6 | 6
WC | (Monaco) B Balleret | 3 | 2
9 | (France) G Simon | 6 | 6
13 | (Spain) F Verdasco | 4 | 6 | 7
(Belgium) O Rochus | 6 | 2 | 5
(Croatia) I Ljubičić | 0 | 3
(Croatia) I Dodig | 6 | 6
(Germany) P Kohlschreiber | 6 | 6
Q | (France) G Rufin | 4 | 4

Second round
7 | (Serbia) J Tipsarević | 6 | 6
(Spain) A Montañés | 2 | 3
Q | (Portugal) F Gil | 3 | 0
9 | (France) G Simon | 6 | 6
13 | (Spain) F Verdasco | 3 | 6 | 6
(Croatia) I Dodig | 6 | 3 | 1
(Germany) P Kohlschreiber | 2 | 4
4 | (France) J-W Tsonga | 6 | 6

Third round
7 | (Serbia) J Tipsarević | 0 | 6 | 1
9 | (France) G Simon | 6 | 4 | 6
13 | (Spain) F Verdasco | 6^{7} | 2
4 | (France) J-W Tsonga | 7^{9} | 6

Quarterfinals
9 | (France) G Simon | 7 | 6
4 | (France) J-W Tsonga | 5 | 4

==== Section 4 ====
First round
(Argentina) C Berlocq | 2^{r}
WC | (Italy) P Starace | 4
Q | (Argentina) F Delbonis | 6 | 4 | 2
(Spain) P Andújar | 3 | 6 | 6
(Switzerland) S Wawrinka | 6 | 6
10 | (Spain) F López | 1 | 4
14 | (Germany) F Mayer | 6 | 1 | 3
Q | (Kazakhstan) M Kukushkin | 3 | 6 | 6
Q | (Italy) A Giannessi | 5 | 3
(Italy) F Volandri | 7 | 6
(Czech Republic) R Štěpánek | 3 | 6^{3}
(Finland) J Nieminen | 6 | 7^{7}

Second round
8 | (Spain) N Almagro | 7^{7} | 6
WC | (Italy) P Starace | 6^{3} | 1
(Spain) P Andújar | 5 | 3
(Switzerland) S Wawrinka | 7 | 6
Q | (Kazakhstan) M Kukushkin | 7^{10} | 2 | 6
(Italy) F Volandri | 6^{8} | 6 | 2
(Finland) J Nieminen | 4 | 3
2 | (Spain) R Nadal | 6 | 6

Third round
8 | (Spain) N Almagro | 3 | 3
(Switzerland) S Wawrinka | 6 | 6
Q | (Kazakhstan) M Kukushkin | 1 | 1
2 | (Spain) R Nadal | 6 | 6

Quarterfinals
(Switzerland) S Wawrinka | 5 | 4
2 | (Spain) R Nadal | 7 | 6

== Qualifying ==
=== Seeds ===
1. (Belgium) Steve Darcis (qualifying competition)
2. (Kazakhstan) Mikhail Kukushkin (qualified)
3. (Ukraine) Sergiy Stakhovsky (first round)
4. (Argentina) Leonardo Mayer (first round)
5. (France) Édouard Roger-Vasselin (qualifying competition)
6. (Czech Republic) Lukáš Rosol (first round)
7. (Germany) Tobias Kamke (first round)
8. (Portugal) Frederico Gil (qualified)
9. (Bulgaria) Grigor Dimitrov (qualifying competition)
10. (Romania) Adrian Ungur (qualifying competition)
11. (Spain) Daniel Gimeno Traver (qualifying competition)
12. (Germany) Matthias Bachinger (qualifying competition)
13. (Romania) Victor Hănescu (qualified)
14. (Italy) Simone Bolelli (qualified)

=== Qualifiers ===
1. (Portugal) Frederico Gil
2. (Kazakhstan) Mikhail Kukushkin
3. (Italy) Alessandro Giannessi
4. (Argentina) Federico Delbonis
5. (Italy) Simone Bolelli
6. (France) Guillaume Rufin
7. (Romania) Victor Hănescu

=== Draw ===
==== First qualifier ====
First round
1 | (Belgium) Steve Darcis | 6 | 1
WC | (France) Sebastien Couberes | 2 | 0^{r}
(Spain) Arnau Brugués Davi | 6 | 6^{5} | 5
8 | (Portugal) Frederico Gil | 1 | 7^{7} | 7

Qualifying competition
1 | (Belgium) Steve Darcis | 3 | 6 | 6^{5}
8 | (Portugal) Frederico Gil | 6 | 3 | 7^{7}

==== Second qualifier ====
First round
2 | (Kazakhstan) Mikhail Kukushkin | 6 | 6
(France) Arnaud Clément | 2 | 2
WC | (Monaco) Thomas Drouet | 1 | 3
9 | (Bulgaria) Grigor Dimitrov | 6 | 6

Qualifying competition
2 | (Kazakhstan) Mikhail Kukushkin | 6 | 7
9 | (Bulgaria) Grigor Dimitrov | 4 | 5

==== Third qualifier ====
First round
3 | (Ukraine) Sergiy Stakhovsky | 2 | 7^{7} | 0
(Italy) Alessandro Giannessi | 6 | 6^{4} | 6
(Spain) Iñigo Cervantes | 4 | 7^{7} | 2
11 | (Spain) Daniel Gimeno Traver | 6 | 6^{5} | 6

Qualifying competition
(Italy) Alessandro Giannessi | 6 | 7^{7}
11 | (Spain) Daniel Gimeno Traver | 1 | 6^{2}

==== Fourth qualifier ====
First round
4 | (Argentina) Leonardo Mayer | 6^{5} | 4
(Argentina) Federico Delbonis | 7^{7} | 6
WC | (Monaco) Guillaume Couillard | 4 | 2
10 | (Romania) Adrian Ungur | 6 | 6

Qualifying competition
(Argentina) Federico Delbonis | 6 | 6
10 | (Romania) Adrian Ungur | 4 | 1

==== Fifth qualifier ====
First round
5 | (France) Édouard Roger-Vasselin | 6 | 7
(Spain) Daniel Muñoz de la Nava | 2 | 5
(Ukraine) Sergei Bubka | 2 | 4
14 | (Italy) Simone Bolelli | 6 | 6

Qualifying competition
5 | (France) Édouard Roger-Vasselin | 7^{7} | 2 | 5
14 | (Italy) Simone Bolelli | 6^{4} | 6 | 7

==== Sixth qualifier ====
First round
6 | (Czech Republic) Lukáš Rosol | 6^{3} | 7^{7} | 3
(France) Guillaume Rufin | 7^{7} | 6^{3} | 6
(France) Stéphane Robert | 1 | 3
12 | (Germany) Matthias Bachinger | 6 | 6

Qualifying competition
(France) Guillaume Rufin | 1 | 6 | 6
12 | (Germany) Matthias Bachinger | 6 | 3 | 3

==== Seventh qualifier ====
First round
7 | (Germany) Tobias Kamke | 6 | 5 | 4
(Germany) Michael Berrer | 3 | 7 | 6
WC | (Monaco) Thomas Oger | 3 | 4
13 | (Romania) Victor Hănescu | 6 | 6

Qualifying competition
(Germany) Michael Berrer | 1 | 4
13 | (Romania) Victor Hănescu | 6 | 6
