= 2012 Crédit Agricole Suisse Open Gstaad – Singles =

Singles
- 2012 Crédit Agricole Suisse Open Gstaad

Final
- Champion: (Brazil) Thomaz Bellucci
- Runner-up: (Serbia) Janko Tipsarević
- Score: 6–7^{(6–8)}, 6–4, 6–2

Details
- Draw: 28
- Seeds: 8

Events
Singles	Doubles
- Swiss Open

Marcel Granollers was the defending champion, but lost to Łukasz Kubot in the second round.
Thomaz Bellucci won the tournament by defeating Janko Tipsarević 6–7^{(6–8)}, 6–4, 6–2 in the final.

== Seeds ==
The top four seeds receive a bye into the second round.

1. (Serbia) Janko Tipsarević (final)
2. (Spain) Marcel Granollers (second round)
3. (Switzerland) Stanislas Wawrinka (second round)
4. (Russia) Mikhail Youzhny (second round)
5. (Spain) Feliciano López (quarterfinals)
6. (France) Julien Benneteau (first round)
7. (Colombia) Santiago Giraldo (second round)
8. (Australia) Bernard Tomic (first round)

== Draw ==
Key

- Q = Qualifier
- WC = Wild card
- LL = Lucky loser
- Alt = Alternate
- ITF = ITF entry
- PR = Protected ranking
- SR = Special ranking
- SE = Special exempt
- JE = Junior exempt
- JR = Junior Accelerator Programme entrant
- CO = College Accelerator Programme entrant
- NG = Next Gen Accelerator Program entrant
- w/o = Walkover
- r = Retired
- d = Defaulted

=== Finals ===
Semifinals
1	(Serbia) Janko Tipsarević	7^{12}	6
(France) Paul-Henri Mathieu	6^{10}	3
(Brazil) Thomaz Bellucci	7^{7}	7^{7}
(Bulgaria) Grigor Dimitrov	6^{3}	6^{5}

Final
1	(Serbia) Janko Tipsarević	7^{8}	4	2
(Brazil) Thomaz Bellucci	6^{6}	6	6

=== Top half ===
First round
WC	(Switzerland) S Ehrat	2	4
Q	(Austria) M Fischer	6	6
Q	(Italy) M Viola	3	6	3
Q	(Czech Republic) J Hernych	6	2	6
WC	(Switzerland) H Laaksonen	2	2
7	(Colombia) S Giraldo	6	6
(Russia) I Andreev	3	6^{4}
(France) P-H Mathieu	6	7^{7}
(Italy) F Volandri	6^{2}	6	3
(Latvia) E Gulbis	7^{7}	4	6
(France) B Paire	6	6
8/WC	(Australia) B Tomic	0	4

Second round
1	(Serbia) J Tipsarević	4	7^{7}	6
Q	(Austria) M Fischer	6	6^{1}	3
Q	(Czech Republic) J Hernych	6	2	6
7	(Colombia) S Giraldo	3	6	4
3	(Switzerland) S Wawrinka	6^{3}	6^{8}
(France) P-H Mathieu	7^{7}	7^{10}
(Latvia) E Gulbis	5	7^{7}	6
(France) B Paire	7	6^{3}	4

Quarterfinals
1	(Serbia) J Tipsarević	6	6
Q	(Czech Republic) J Hernych	2	1
(France) P-H Mathieu	4	6	6
(Latvia) E Gulbis	6	1	4

Semifinals
1	(Serbia) J Tipsarević	7^{12}	6
(France) P-H Mathieu	6^{10}	3

=== Bottom half ===
First round
5	(Spain) F López	2	6	7^{9}
(Romania) A Ungur	6	4	6^{7}
SE	(Czech Republic) J Hájek	4
(France) É Roger-Vasselin	1^{r}
(Brazil) T Bellucci	6	6
(Slovenia) B Kavčič	1	1
6	(France) J Benneteau	6	4	1
(Bulgaria) G Dimitrov	3	6	6
Q	(Germany) D Brown	3	6	7^{10}
(Ukraine) S Stakhovsky	6	4	6^{8}
(Poland) Ł Kubot	3	6	6
(Croatia) I Dodig	6	3	4

Second round
5	(Spain) F López	6^{3}	6	6
SE	(Czech Republic) J Hájek	7^{7}	1	4
(Brazil) T Bellucci	4	6	6
4	(Russia) M Youzhny	6	2	4
(Bulgaria) G Dimitrov	7^{7}	3	6
Q	(Germany) D Brown	6^{3}	6	2
(Poland) Ł Kubot	6	6
2	(Spain) M Granollers	4	2

Quarterfinals
5	(Spain) F López	3	3
(Brazil) T Bellucci	6	6
(Bulgaria) G Dimitrov	6	6
(Poland) Ł Kubot	3	2

Semifinals
(Brazil) T Bellucci	7^{7}	7^{7}
(Bulgaria) G Dimitrov	6^{3}	6^{5}

== Qualifying ==
=== Seeds ===
1. (Spain) Roberto Bautista Agut (second round, retired)
2. (Brazil) João Souza (second round)
3. (Brazil) Thiago Alves (qualifying competition)
4. (Portugal) João Sousa (qualifying competition)
5. (Germany) Dustin Brown (qualified)
6. (Italy) Matteo Viola (qualified)
7. (Czech Republic) Jan Hernych (qualified)
8. (Uzbekistan) Farrukh Dustov (qualifying competition)

=== Qualifiers ===
1. (Austria) Martin Fischer
2. (Czech Republic) Jan Hernych
3. (Italy) Matteo Viola
4. (Germany) Dustin Brown

=== Draw ===
==== First qualifier ====
First round
1	(Spain) Roberto Bautista Agut	6	6
(Switzerland) Alexander Sadecky	3	2
(Switzerland) Dimitri Bretting	2	0
(Austria) Martin Fischer	6	6
(Germany) Frank Moser	6	6
(France) Romain Jouan	3	4
(United Kingdom) Morgan Phillips	6	6^{6}	3
8	(Uzbekistan) Farrukh Dustov	3	7^{8}	6

Second round
1	(Spain) Roberto Bautista Agut	1	0^{r}
(Austria) Martin Fischer	6	1
(Germany) Frank Moser	7^{7}	6^{8}	4
8	(Uzbekistan) Farrukh Dustov	6^{4}	7^{10}	6

Qualifying competition
(Austria) Martin Fischer	6	6
8	(Uzbekistan) Farrukh Dustov	4	0

==== Second qualifier ====
First round
2	(Brazil) João Souza	6	1	6
(Italy) Francesco Vilardo	4	6	1
WC	(Switzerland) Raphael Mori	0	0
(Germany) Denis Gremelmayr	6	6
(Germany) Nils Langer	6	2	1
(Russia) Mikhail Elgin	3	6	6
(Greece) Alexandros Jakupovic	6	6^{6}	4
7	(Czech Republic) Jan Hernych	3	7^{8}	6

Second round
2	(Brazil) João Souza	6^{3}	2
(Germany) Denis Gremelmayr	7^{7}	6
(Russia) Mikhail Elgin	3	2
7	(Czech Republic) Jan Hernych	6	6

Qualifying competition
(Germany) Denis Gremelmayr	6	1	4
7	(Czech Republic) Jan Hernych	3	6	6

==== Third qualifier ====
First round
3	(Brazil) Thiago Alves	6	6
WC	(Switzerland) George Bastl	2	1
(Hungary) Márton Fucsovics	4	6	6
WC	(Switzerland) Federico Valsangiacomo	6	3	1
(Italy) Damiano di Ienno	3	5
(Sweden) Christian Lindell	6	7
(Uruguay) Marcel Felder	3	4
6	(Italy) Matteo Viola	6	6

Second round
3	(Brazil) Thiago Alves	6	6
(Hungary) Márton Fucsovics	2	4
(Sweden) Christian Lindell	6^{7}	6	4
6	(Italy) Matteo Viola	7^{9}	1	6

Qualifying competition
3	(Brazil) Thiago Alves	5	0
6	(Italy) Matteo Viola	7	6

==== Fourth qualifier ====
First round
4	(Portugal) João Sousa	6	1	6
(Slovakia) Ivo Klec	4	6	1
(Switzerland) Alexander Ritschard	6	1	6
WC	(Switzerland) Patrick Eichenberger	3	6	2
(Spain) Iván Navarro	6	6
(Switzerland) Claude Benz	2	2
(Switzerland) Yann Marti	4	6^{0}
5	(Germany) Dustin Brown	6	7^{7}

Second round
4	(Portugal) João Sousa	6	7^{9}
(Switzerland) Alexander Ritschard	1	6^{7}
(Spain) Iván Navarro	6	3	2
5	(Germany) Dustin Brown	3	6	6

Qualifying competition
4	(Portugal) João Sousa	6	4	6^{6}
5	(Germany) Dustin Brown	2	6	7^{8}
