= 2012 ATP World Tour Finals – Singles =

Singles
- 2012 ATP World Tour Finals

Final
- Champion: (Serbia) Novak Djokovic
- Runner-up: (Switzerland) Roger Federer
- Score: 7–6^{(8–6)}, 7–5

Events
Singles	Doubles
- ATP World Tour Finals

Novak Djokovic defeated the two-time defending champion Roger Federer in the final, 7–6^{(8–6)}, 7–5 to win the singles tennis title at the 2012 ATP World Tour Finals. It was his second Tour Finals title.

Janko Tipsarević made his debut as a direct qualifier, after playing two matches as an alternate in 2011.

== Seeds ==
1. (Serbia) Novak Djokovic (champion)
2. (Switzerland) Roger Federer (final)
3. (United Kingdom) Andy Murray (semifinals)
4. (Spain) David Ferrer (round robin)
5. (Czech Republic) Tomáš Berdych (round robin)
6. (Argentina) Juan Martín del Potro (semifinals)
7. (France) Jo-Wilfried Tsonga (round robin)
8. (Serbia) Janko Tipsarević (round robin)

== Alternates ==
1. (France) Richard Gasquet (Did not play)
2. (Spain) Nicolás Almagro (Did not play)

== Draw ==
Key

- Q = Qualifier
- WC = Wild card
- LL = Lucky loser
- Alt = Alternate
- ITF = ITF entry
- PR = Protected ranking
- SR = Special ranking
- SE = Special exempt
- JE = Junior exempt
- JR = Junior Accelerator Programme entrant
- CO = College Accelerator Programme entrant
- NG = Next Gen Accelerator Program entrant
- w/o = Walkover
- r = Retired
- d = Defaulted

=== Finals ===
Semifinals
1	(Serbia) Novak Djokovic	4	6	6
6	(Argentina) Juan Martín del Potro	6	3	2
2	(Switzerland) Roger Federer	7^{7}	6
3	(United Kingdom) Andy Murray	6^{5}	2

Final
1	(Serbia) Novak Djokovic	7^{8}	7
2	(Switzerland) Roger Federer	6^{6}	5

=== Group A ===
		(Serbia) Djokovic	(United Kingdom) Murray	(Czech Republic) Berdych	(France) Tsonga	RR W–L	Set W–L	Game W–L	Standings
1	(Serbia) Novak Djokovic		4–6, 6–3, 7–5	6–2, 7–6^{(8–6)}	7–6^{(7–4)}, 6–3	3–0	6–1 (85.7%)	43–31 (58.1%)	1
3	(United Kingdom) Andy Murray	6–4, 3–6, 5–7		3–6, 6–3, 6–4	6–2, 7–6^{(7–3)}	2–1	5–3 (62.5%)	42–38 (52.5%)	2
5	(Czech Republic) Tomáš Berdych	2–6, 6–7^{(6–8)}	6–3, 3–6, 4–6		7–5, 3–6, 6–1	1–2	3–5 (37.5%)	37–40 (48.1%)	3
7	(France) Jo-Wilfried Tsonga	6–7^{(4–7)}, 3–6	2–6, 6–7^{(3–7)}	5–7, 6–3, 1–6		0–3	1–6 (14.3%)	29–42 (40.8%)	4

Standings are determined by: 1. number of wins; 2. number of matches; 3. in two-players-ties, head-to-head records; 4. in three-players-ties, percentage of sets won, or of games won initially to sort out a superior/inferior player, then head-to-head records; 5. ATP rankings.

=== Group B ===
		(Switzerland) Federer	(Spain) Ferrer	(Argentina) Del Potro	(Serbia) Tipsarević	RR W–L	Set W–L	Game W–L	Standings
2	(Switzerland) Roger Federer		6–4, 7–6^{(7–5)}	6–7^{(3–7)}, 6–4, 3–6	6–3, 6–1	2–1	5–2 (71.4%)	40–31 (56.3%)	1
4	(Spain) David Ferrer	4–6, 6–7^{(5–7)}		6–3, 3–6, 6–4	4–6, 6–3, 6–1	2–1	4–4 (50.0%)	41–36 (53.2%)	3
6	(Argentina) Juan Martín del Potro	7–6^{(7–3)}, 4–6, 6–3	3–6, 6–3, 4–6		6–0, 6–4	2–1	5–3 (62.5%)	42–34 (55.3%)	2
8	(Serbia) Janko Tipsarević	3–6, 1–6	6–4, 3–6, 1–6	0–6, 4–6		0–3	1–6 (14.3%)	18–40 (31.0%)	4

Standings are determined by: 1. number of wins; 2. number of matches; 3. in two-players-ties, head-to-head records; 4. in three-players-ties, percentage of sets won, or of games won initially to sort out a superior/inferior player, then head-to-head records; 5. ATP rankings.
