= 2012 Crédit Agricole Suisse Open Gstaad =

- Date: 16 – 22 July
- Edition: 45th
- Category: ATP World Tour 250 Series
- Draw: 28S / 16D
- Prize money: €358,425
- Surface: Clay / outdoor
- Location: Gstaad, Switzerland
- Venue: Roy Emerson Arena

Champions

Singles
- (Brazil) Thomaz Bellucci

Doubles
- (Spain) Marcel Granollers / (Spain) Marc López
- Swiss Open

The 2012 Crédit Agricole Suisse Open Gstaad was a men's tennis tournament played on outdoor clay courts. It was the 45th edition of the Crédit Agricole Suisse Open Gstaad, and was part of the ATP World Tour 250 Series of the 2012 ATP World Tour. It took place at the Roy Emerson Arena in Gstaad, Switzerland, from 16 July through 22 July 2012. Unseeded Thomaz Bellucci won the singles title.

== Finals ==
=== Singles ===
- (Brazil) Thomaz Bellucci defeated (Serbia) Janko Tipsarević, 6–7^{(6–8)}, 6–4, 6–2

=== Doubles ===
- (Spain) Marcel Granollers / (Spain) Marc López defeated (Colombia) Robert Farah / (Colombia) Santiago Giraldo, 6–4, 7–6^{(11–9)}

== Singles main draw entrants ==
=== Seeds ===
Country	Player	Rank^{1}	Seed
SRB	Janko Tipsarević	8	1
ESP	Marcel Granollers	24	2
SUI	Stanislas Wawrinka	25	3
RUS	Mikhail Youzhny	28	4
ESP	Feliciano López	29	5
FRA	Julien Benneteau	32	6
COL	Santiago Giraldo	43	7
AUS	Bernard Tomic	45	8

- ^{1} Rankings are as of July 9, 2012

=== Other entrants ===
The following players received wildcards into the singles main draw:

- (Switzerland) Sandro Ehrat
- (Switzerland) Henri Laaksonen
- (Australia) Bernard Tomic

The following players received entry as a special exempt into the singles main draw:

- (Czech Republic) Jan Hájek

The following players received entry from the qualifying draw:

- (Germany) Dustin Brown
- (Austria) Martin Fischer
- (Czech Republic) Jan Hernych
- (Italy) Matteo Viola

=== Withdrawals ===
- (Spain) David Ferrer (fatigue)

=== Retirements ===
- (France) Édouard Roger-Vasselin

== Doubles main draw entrants ==
=== Seeds ===
Country	Player	Country	Player	Rank^{1}	Seed
ESP	Marcel Granollers	ESP	Marc López	35	1
CRO	Ivan Dodig	BRA	Marcelo Melo	61	2
AUS	Paul Hanley	AUT	Julian Knowle	92	3
GER	Dustin Brown	RUS	Mikhail Elgin	104	4

- Rankings are as of July 9, 2012

=== Other entrants ===
The following pairs received wildcards into the doubles main draw:

- (Switzerland) Sandro Ehrat / (France) Paul-Henri Mathieu
- (Switzerland) Henri Laaksonen / (Switzerland) Alexander Sadecky

=== Retirements ===
- (Italy) Filippo Volandri (gastrointestinal illness)
