= 2012 ATP World Tour Finals – Doubles =

Doubles
- 2012 ATP World Tour Finals

Final
- Champion: (Spain) Marcel Granollers (Spain) Marc López
- Runner-up: (India) Mahesh Bhupathi (India) Rohan Bopanna
- Score: 7–5, 3–6, [10–3]

Events
Singles	Doubles
- ATP World Tour Finals

Marcel Granollers and Marc López defeated Mahesh Bhupathi and Rohan Bopanna in the final, 7–5, 3–6, [10–3] to win the doubles tennis title at the 2012 ATP World Tour Finals.

Max Mirnyi and Daniel Nestor were the defending champions, but were eliminated in the round-robin stage.

== Seeds ==
1. (United States) Bob Bryan / (United States) Mike Bryan (round robin)
2. (Belarus) Max Mirnyi / (Canada) Daniel Nestor (round robin)
3. (India) Leander Paes / (Czech Republic) Radek Štěpánek (semifinals)
4. (Sweden) Robert Lindstedt / (Romania) Horia Tecău (round robin)
5. (India) Mahesh Bhupathi / (India) Rohan Bopanna (finals)
6. (Spain) Marcel Granollers / (Spain) Marc López (champions)
7. (Pakistan) Aisam-ul-Haq Qureshi / (Netherlands) Jean-Julien Rojer (round robin)
8. (United Kingdom) Jonathan Marray / (Denmark) Frederik Nielsen (semifinals)

== Draw ==
Key

- Q = Qualifier
- WC = Wild card
- LL = Lucky loser
- Alt = Alternate
- ITF = ITF entry
- PR = Protected ranking
- SR = Special ranking
- SE = Special exempt
- JE = Junior exempt
- JR = Junior Accelerator Programme entrant
- CO = College Accelerator Programme entrant
- NG = Next Gen Accelerator Program entrant
- w/o = Walkover
- r = Retired
- d = Defaulted

=== Finals ===
Semifinals
3	(India) Leander Paes (Czech Republic) Radek Štěpánek	6	1	[10]
5	(India) Mahesh Bhupathi (India) Rohan Bopanna	4	6	[12]
8	(United Kingdom) Jonathan Marray (Denmark) Frederik Nielsen	4	3
6	(Spain) Marcel Granollers (Spain) Marc López	6	6

Final
5	(India) Mahesh Bhupathi (India) Rohan Bopanna	5	6	[3]
6	(Spain) Marcel Granollers (Spain) Marc López	7	3	[10]

=== Group A ===
		(United States) Bryan (United States) Bryan	(India) Paes (Czech Republic) Štěpánek	(Spain) Granollers (Spain) López	(Pakistan) Qureshi (Netherlands) Rojer	RR W–L	Set W–L	Game W–L	Standings
1	(United States) Bob Bryan (United States) Mike Bryan		4–6, 7–6^{(8–6)}, [7–10]	5–7, 7–5, [9–11]	7–5, 6–4	1–2	4–4 (50.0%)	36–35 (50.7%)	3
3	(India) Leander Paes (Czech Republic) Radek Štěpánek	6–4, 6–7^{(6–8)}, [10–7]		7–5, 6–4	6–4, 7–5	3–0	6–1 (85.7%)	39–29 (57.3%)	1
6	(Spain) Marcel Granollers (Spain) Marc López	7–5, 5–7, [11–9]	5–7, 4–6		6–4, 6–2	2–1	4–3 (57.1%)	34–31 (52.3%)	2
7	(Pakistan) Aisam-ul-Haq Qureshi (Netherlands) Jean-Julien Rojer	5–7, 4–6	4–6, 5–7	4–6, 2–6		0–3	0–6 (0.0%)	24–38 (38.7%)	4

Standings are determined by: 1. number of wins; 2. number of matches; 3. in two-players-ties, head-to-head records; 4. in three-players-ties, percentage of sets won, or of games won; 5. steering-committee decision.

=== Group B ===
		(Belarus) Mirnyi (Canada) Nestor	(Sweden) Lindstedt (Romania) Tecău	(India) Bhupathi (India) Bopanna	(United Kingdom) Marray (Denmark) Nielsen	RR W–L	Set W–L	Game W–L	Standings
2	(Belarus) Max Mirnyi (Canada) Daniel Nestor		4–6, 7–6^{(7–1)}, [12–10]	6–7^{(5–7)}, 7–6^{(7–5)}, [5–10]	6–7^{(3–7)}, 6–4, [10–12]	1–2	4–5 (44.4%)	37–38 (49.3%)	3
4	(Sweden) Robert Lindstedt (Romania) Horia Tecău	6–4, 6–7^{(1–7)}, [10–12]		3–6, 7–5, [5–10]	6–3, 7–5	1–2	4–4 (50.0%)	35–32 (52.2%)	4
5	(India) Mahesh Bhupathi (India) Rohan Bopanna	7–6^{(7–5)}, 6–7^{(5–7)}, [10–5]	6–3, 5–7, [10–5]		4–6, 7–6^{(7–1)}, [10–12]	2–1	5–4 (55.6%)	37–36 (50.7%)	2
8	(United Kingdom) Jonathan Marray (Denmark) Frederik Nielsen	7–6^{(7–3)}, 4–6, [12–10]	3–6, 5–7	6–4, 6–7^{(1–7)}, [12–10]		2–1	4–4 (50.0%)	33–36 (47.8%)	1

Standings are determined by: 1. number of wins; 2. number of matches; 3. in two-players-ties, head-to-head records; 4. in three-players-ties, percentage of sets won, or of games won; 5. steering-committee decision.
