= 2012 Crédit Agricole Suisse Open Gstaad – Doubles =

Doubles
- 2012 Crédit Agricole Suisse Open Gstaad

Final
- Champions: (Spain) Marcel Granollers (Spain) Marc López
- Runners-up: (Colombia) Robert Farah (Colombia) Santiago Giraldo
- Score: 6–4, 7–6^{(11–9)}

Details
- Draw: 16
- Seeds: 4

Events
Singles	Doubles
- Swiss Open

František Čermák and Filip Polášek were the defending champions but decided not to participate.
Marcel Granollers and Marc López won the title by beating Robert Farah and Santiago Giraldo 6–4, 7–6 in the final.

== Seeds ==
1. (Spain) Marcel Granollers / (Spain) Marc López (champions)
2. (Croatia) Ivan Dodig / (Brazil) Marcelo Melo (semifinals)
3. (Australia) Paul Hanley / (Austria) Julian Knowle (quarterfinals)
4. (Germany) Dustin Brown / (Russia) Mikhail Elgin (first round)

== Draw ==
Key

- Q = Qualifier
- WC = Wild card
- LL = Lucky loser
- Alt = Alternate
- ITF = ITF entry
- PR = Protected ranking
- SR = Special ranking
- SE = Special exempt
- JE = Junior exempt
- JR = Junior Accelerator Programme entrant
- CO = College Accelerator Programme entrant
- NG = Next Gen Accelerator Program entrant
- w/o = Walkover
- r = Retired
- d = Defaulted

=== Draw ===
First round
1	(Spain) M Granollers (Spain) M López	6	6
(Slovenia) B Kavčič (Slovakia) I Zelenay	3	3
(Slovakia) M Mertiňák (Germany) F Moser	6	6
WC	(Switzerland) H Laaksonen (Switzerland) A Sadecky	4	3
3	(Australia) P Hanley (Austria) J Knowle	6	6
(Uruguay) M Felder (Germany) P Marx	3	4
(United States) J Cerretani (France) É Roger-Vasselin	3	7	[7]
(Brazil) T Bellucci (Germany) M Kohlmann	6	5	[10]
(Sweden) J Brunström (Belgium) D Norman	6	4	[8]
(Colombia) R Farah (Colombia) S Giraldo	4	6	[10]
(Romania) A Ungur (Italy) F Volandri	5	7^{7}	[10]
4	(Germany) D Brown (Russia) M Elgin	7	6^{4}	[3]
(Ukraine) S Stakhovsky (Russia) M Youzhny	6^{4}	7	[10]
(Poland) Ł Kubot (Serbia) J Tipsarević	7^{7}	5	[8]
WC	(Switzerland) S Ehrat (France) P-H Mathieu	5	1
2	(Croatia) I Dodig (Brazil) M Melo	7	6

Quarterfinals
1	(Spain) M Granollers (Spain) M López	7	6
(Slovakia) M Mertiňák (Germany) F Moser	5	2
3	(Australia) P Hanley (Austria) J Knowle	6	3	[5]
(Brazil) T Bellucci (Germany) M Kohlmann	1	6	[10]
(Colombia) R Farah (Colombia) S Giraldo	w/o
(Romania) A Ungur (Italy) F Volandri
(Ukraine) S Stakhovsky (Russia) M Youzhny	3	3
2	(Croatia) I Dodig (Brazil) M Melo	6	6

Semifinals
1	(Spain) M Granollers (Spain) M López	6	7^{9}
(Brazil) T Bellucci (Germany) M Kohlmann	4	6^{7}
(Colombia) R Farah (Colombia) S Giraldo	3	7^{7}	[10]
2	(Croatia) I Dodig (Brazil) M Melo	6	6^{5}	[8]

Final
1	(Spain) M Granollers (Spain) M López	6	7^{11}
(Colombia) R Farah (Colombia) S Giraldo	4	6^{9}
