= 2012 Monte-Carlo Rolex Masters =

- Date: 16–22 April
- Edition: 106th
- Surface: Clay / outdoor
- Location: Roquebrune-Cap-Martin, France
- Venue: Monte Carlo Country Club

Champions

Singles
- (Spain) Rafael Nadal

Doubles
- (United States) Bob Bryan / (United States) Mike Bryan
- Monte-Carlo Masters

The 2012 Monte-Carlo Rolex Masters was a men's tennis tournament for male professional players, played from 16 April through 22 April 2012, on outdoor clay courts. It was the 106th edition of the annual Monte Carlo Masters tournament, which was sponsored by Rolex for the fourth time. It took place at the Monte Carlo Country Club in Roquebrune-Cap-Martin, France, near Monte Carlo, Monaco. Second-seeded Rafael Nadal won the singles title.

== Points and prize money ==
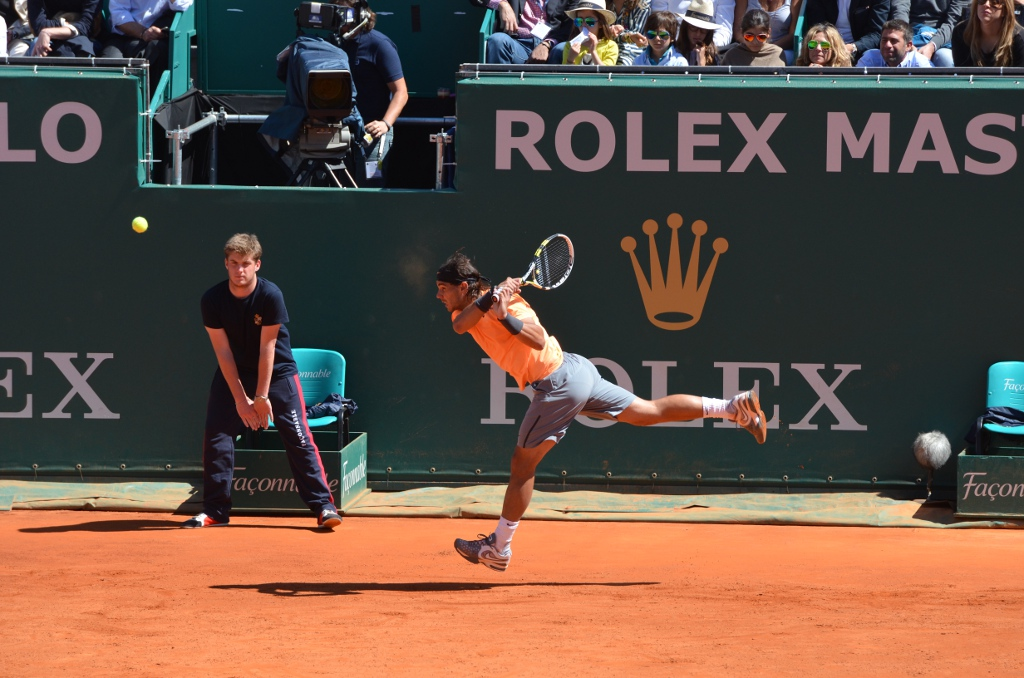
Nadal during the finals

=== Points ===
Because the Monte Carlo Masters is the non-mandatory Masters 1000 event, special rules regarding points distribution are in place. The Monte Carlo Masters counts as one of a player's 500 level tournaments, while distributing Masters 1000 points.

Event	W	F	SF	QF	Round of 16	Round of 32	Round of 64	Q	Q2	Q1
Singles	1000	600	360	180	90	45	10	25	16	0
Doubles	1000	600	360	180	90	0	—N/a	—N/a	—N/a	—N/a

=== Prize money ===
Stage	Men's singles	Men's doubles
Champion	€460,260	€142,500
Runner up	€225,680	€69,780
Semifinals	€113,580	€35,000
Quarterfinals	€57,775	€17,970
Round of 16	€30,000	€9,290
Round of 32	€15,810	€4,900
Round of 64	€8,535	–
Qualifying final round	€1,965	–
Qualifying first round	€1,000	–

== Singles main draw entrants ==
=== Seeds ===
Country	Player	Rank^{1}	Seed
SRB	Novak Djokovic	1	1
ESP	Rafael Nadal	2	2
GBR	Andy Murray	4	3
FRA	Jo-Wilfried Tsonga	5	4
ESP	David Ferrer	6	5
CZE	Tomáš Berdych	7	6
SRB	Janko Tipsarević	8	7
ESP	Nicolás Almagro	12	8
FRA	Gilles Simon	13	9
ESP	Feliciano López	15	10
ARG	Juan Mónaco	16	11
JPN	Kei Nishikori	18	12
ESP	Fernando Verdasco	19	13
GER	Florian Mayer	20	14
AUT	Jürgen Melzer	21	15
UKR	Alexandr Dolgopolov	22	16

- Rankings and seedings are as of April 9, 2012

=== Other entrants ===
The following players received wildcards into the main draw:

- (Monaco) Benjamin Balleret
- (Monaco) Jean-René Lisnard
- (France) Paul-Henri Mathieu
- (Italy) Potito Starace

The following players received entry via qualifying:

- (Italy) Simone Bolelli
- (Argentina) Federico Delbonis
- (Italy) Alessandro Giannessi
- (Portugal) Frederico Gil
- (Romania) Victor Hănescu
- (Kazakhstan) Mikhail Kukushkin
- (France) Guillaume Rufin

=== Withdrawals ===
- (France) Richard Gasquet (shoulder injury)
- (United States) John Isner
- (France) Gaël Monfils (side strain)

=== Retirements ===
- (France) Julien Benneteau (right ankle injury)
- (Argentina) Carlos Berlocq (left calf injury)
- (Argentina) Juan Mónaco (right ankle injury)

== Doubles main draw entrants ==
=== Seeds ===
Country	Player	Country	Player	Rank^{1}	Seed
USA	Bob Bryan	USA	Mike Bryan	2	1
BLR	Max Mirnyi	CAN	Daniel Nestor	6	2
FRA	Michaël Llodra	SRB	Nenad Zimonjić	11	3
POL	Mariusz Fyrstenberg	POL	Marcin Matkowski	18	4
IND	Leander Paes	CZE	Radek Štěpánek	21	5
IND	Mahesh Bhupathi	IND	Rohan Bopanna	23	6
SWE	Robert Lindstedt	ROU	Horia Tecău	23	7
CZE	František Čermák	SVK	Filip Polášek	42	8

- Rankings are as of April 9, 2012

=== Other entrants ===
The following pairs received wildcards into the doubles main draw:

- (Italy) Simone Bolelli / (Italy) Fabio Fognini
- (France) Arnaud Clément / (Monaco) Jean-René Lisnard

The following pairs received entry as alternates:

- (Croatia) Marin Čilić / (Brazil) Marcelo Melo
- (France) Édouard Roger-Vasselin / (France) Gilles Simon

=== Withdrawals ===
- (United Kingdom) Colin Fleming
- (Argentina) Juan Mónaco (right ankle injury)

== Finals ==
=== Singles ===
- (Spain) Rafael Nadal defeated (Serbia) Novak Djokovic, 6–3, 6–1
- It was Nadal's first title of the year and the 47th of his career.

=== Doubles ===
(United States) Bob Bryan / (United States) Mike Bryan defeated (Belarus) Max Mirnyi / (Canada) Daniel Nestor, 6–2, 6–3
