= 2012 Barcelona Open Banc Sabadell =

2012 Barcelona Open Banco Sabadell
- Date: 23–30 April
- Edition: 60th
- Category: ATP World Tour 500
- Draw: 48S / 24D
- Surface: Clay / outdoor
- Location: Barcelona, Spain
- Venue: Real Club de Tenis Barcelona

Champions

Singles
- (Spain) Rafael Nadal

Doubles
- (Poland) Mariusz Fyrstenberg / (Poland) Marcin Matkowski
← 2011 ·	Barcelona Open Banco Sabadell	· 2013 →

The 2012 Barcelona Open Banco Sabadell (also known as the Torneo Godó) was a men's tennis tournament played on outdoor clay courts. It was the 60th edition of the event and it was part of the ATP World Tour 500 series of the 2012 ATP World Tour. It took place at the Real Club de Tenis Barcelona in Barcelona, Catalonia, Spain, from 23 April through 29 April 2010. First-seeded Rafael Nadal won the singles title.

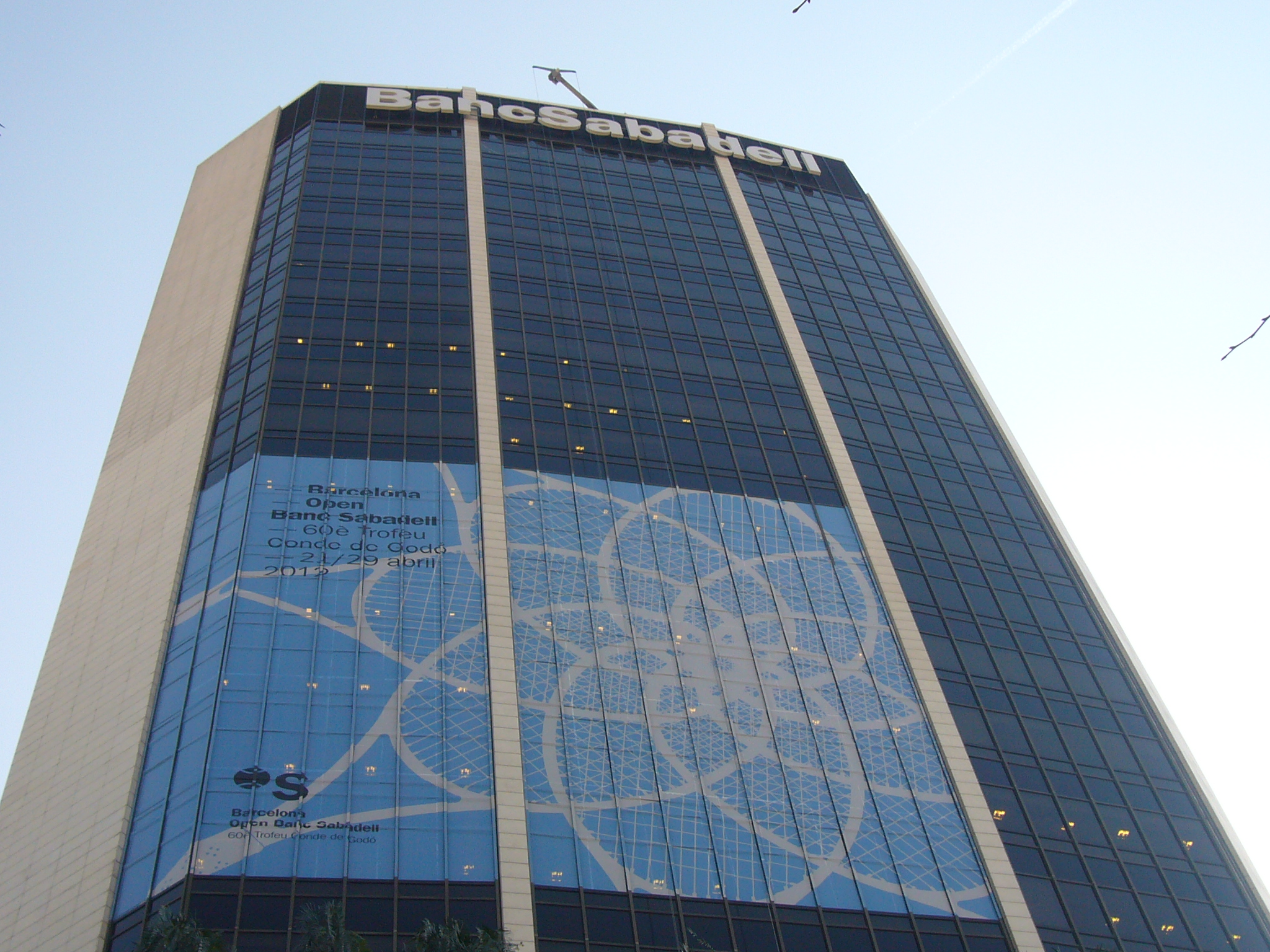
Real Club de Tenis Barcelona, venue for the 2012 Barcelona Open Banco Sabadell

== Points ==
Stage	Men's singles	Men's doubles
Champion	500	
Runner up	300	
Semifinals	180	
Quarterfinals	90	
Round of 16	45	
Round of 32	20	0
Round of 64	0	–
Qualifier	10	–
Qualifying final round	4	–

== Singles main draw entrants ==
=== Seeds ===
Country	Player	Rank^{1}	Seed
ESP	Rafael Nadal	2	1
GBR	Andy Murray	4	2
ESP	David Ferrer	6	3
~~CZE~~	~~Tomáš Berdych~~	~~7~~	~~4~~
SRB	Janko Tipsarević	8	5
ESP	Nicolás Almagro	12	6
ESP	Feliciano López	16	7
JPN	Kei Nishikori	17	8
ESP	Fernando Verdasco	19	9
~~CZE~~	~~Radek Štěpánek~~	~~23~~	~~10~~
CAN	Milos Raonic	24	11
ESP	Marcel Granollers	25	12
RSA	Kevin Anderson	32	13
~~ARG~~	~~Juan Ignacio Chela~~	~~33~~	~~14~~
AUS	Bernard Tomic	36	15
ESP	Pablo Andújar	39	16
ESP	Albert Ramos	42	17
UZB	Denis Istomin	43	18

- ^{1} Rankings as of April 16, 2012

=== Other entrants ===
The following players received wildcards into the main draw:

- (Spain) Iñigo Cervantes Huegun
- (Spain) Gerard Granollers
- (Serbia) Filip Krajinović
- (Spain) Javier Martí
- (Spain) Rubén Ramírez Hidalgo

The following players received entry from the qualifying draw:

- (Slovenia) Aljaž Bedene
- (Ukraine) Sergei Bubka
- (Argentina) Federico Delbonis
- (Colombia) Robert Farah
- (Belgium) David Goffin
- (Kazakhstan) Andrey Golubev
- (Portugal) João Sousa

The following players received entry as lucky loser:

- (Spain) Arnau Brugués-Davi
- (Russia) Evgeny Donskoy
- (France) Stéphane Robert
- (Argentina) Eduardo Schwank

=== Withdrawals ===
- (Brazil) Thomaz Bellucci (abdominal strain injury)
- (Czech Republic) Tomáš Berdych (right shoulder injury)
- (Argentina) Juan Ignacio Chela (achilles tendon injury)
- (Argentina) Juan Mónaco (ankle injury)
- (Czech Republic) Radek Štěpánek (stomach virus)

=== Retirements ===
- (Germany) Andreas Beck
- (Ukraine) Sergei Bubka
- (Japan) Kei Nishikori (abdominal injury)

== Doubles main draw entrants ==
=== Seeds ===
Country	Player	Country	Player	Rank^{1}	Seed
USA	Bob Bryan	USA	Mike Bryan	2	1
BLR	Max Mirnyi	CAN	Daniel Nestor	6	2
IND	Mahesh Bhupati	SRB	Nenad Zimonjić	21	3
POL	Mariusz Fyrstenberg	POL	Marcin Matkowski	22	4
CZE	František Čermák	SVK	Filip Polášek	41	5
MEX	Santiago González	GER	Christopher Kas	46	6
PAK	Aisam-ul-Haq Qureshi	NED	Jean-Julien Rojer	51	7
AUT	Oliver Marach	AUT	Alexander Peya	52	8

- Rankings are as of April 16, 2012

=== Other entrants ===
The following pairs received wildcards into the doubles main draw:

- (Spain) Iñigo Cervantes Huegun / (Spain) Gerard Granollers
- (Spain) Daniel Gimeno-Traver / (Spain) Albert Montañés

=== Retirements ===
- (United States) Bob Bryan (viral illness)

== Finals ==
=== Singles ===
- (Spain) Rafael Nadal defeated (Spain) David Ferrer 7–6^{(7–1)}, 7–5
- It was Nadal's 48th title of his career and the 2nd of the season.

=== Doubles ===
- (Poland) Mariusz Fyrstenberg / (Poland) Marcin Matkowski defeated (Spain) Marcel Granollers / (Spain) Marc López, 2–6, 7–6^{(9–7)}, [10–8]
