= 2012 Shanghai Rolex Masters =

- Date: October 8–14
- Edition: 4th
- Category: ATP World Tour Masters 1000
- Surface: Hard / outdoor
- Location: Shanghai, China
- Venue: Qizhong Forest Sports City Arena

Champions

Singles
- (Serbia) Novak Djokovic

Doubles
- (India) Leander Paes / (Czech Republic) Radek Štěpánek
← 2011 ·	Shanghai Masters	· 2013 →

The 2012 Shanghai Rolex Masters was a men's tennis tournament that was played on outdoor hard courts. It was the fourth edition of the Shanghai ATP Masters 1000, classified as an ATP World Tour Masters 1000 event on the 2012 ATP World Tour. It took place at Qizhong Forest Sports City Arena in Shanghai, China from October 8 to October 14, 2012. Second-seeded Novak Djokovic won the singles title.

== Finals ==
=== Singles ===
- (Serbia) Novak Djokovic defeated (United Kingdom) Andy Murray, 5–7, 7–6^{(13–11)}, 6–3

=== Doubles ===
- (India) Leander Paes' / (Czech Republic) Radek Štěpánek defeated (India) Mahesh Bhupathi / (India) Rohan Bopanna, 6–7^{(7–9)}, 6–3, [10–5]

== Points and prize money ==
=== Points ===
Stage	Singles	Doubles
Champion	1000	
Runner up	600	
Semifinals	360	
Quarterfinals	180	
Round of 16	90	
Round of 32	45	0
Round of 64	10	-
Qualifier	25	-
Qualifying final round	14	-

== Singles main-draw entrants ==
=== Seeds ===
Country	Player	Rank^{1}	Seed
SUI	Roger Federer	1	1
SRB	Novak Djokovic	2	2
GBR	Andy Murray	3	3
CZE	Tomáš Berdych	6	4
FRA	Jo-Wilfried Tsonga	7	5
SRB	Janko Tipsarević	9	6
ARG	Juan Mónaco	10	7
USA	John Isner	11	8
ESP	Nicolás Almagro	12	9
CRO	Marin Čilić	13	10
FRA	Richard Gasquet	14	11
CAN	Milos Raonic	15	12
SUI	Stanislas Wawrinka	16	13
JPN	Kei Nishikori	17	14
FRA	Gilles Simon	18	15
GER	Philipp Kohlschreiber	19	16

- Rankings are as of October 1, 2012

=== Other entrants ===
The following players received wildcards into the singles main draw:

- (Australia) Lleyton Hewitt
- (China) Li Zhe
- (China) Wu Di
- (China) Zhang Ze

The following players received entry from the qualifying draw:

- (United States) Brian Baker
- (Germany) Michael Berrer
- (Russia) Alex Bogomolov Jr.
- (Poland) Łukasz Kubot
- (Chinese Taipei) Lu Yen-hsun
- (Australia) Marinko Matosevic
- (Germany) Philipp Petzschner

=== Withdrawals ===
- (France) Julien Benneteau → replaced by (Bulgaria) Grigor Dimitrov
- (Argentina) Juan Martín del Potro (left wrist injury) → replaced by (Japan) Go Soeda
- (Spain) David Ferrer (stomach virus) → replaced by (Spain) Tommy Robredo
- (United States) Mardy Fish (health issues) → replaced by (Colombia) Alejandro Falla
- (Spain) Marcel Granollers → replaced by (United States) Ryan Harrison
- (France) Gaël Monfils → replaced by (Spain) Albert Ramos Viñolas
- (Spain) Rafael Nadal (left knee injury) → replaced by (Slovakia) Martin Kližan
- (United States) Andy Roddick (retired from tennis) → replaced by (France) Benoît Paire

=== Retirements ===
- (Germany) Florian Mayer (rib injury)

== Doubles main-draw entrants ==
=== Seeds ===
Country	Player	Country	Player	Rank^{1}	Seed
USA	Bob Bryan	USA	Mike Bryan	2	1
BLR	Max Mirnyi	CAN	Daniel Nestor	6	2
SWE	Robert Lindstedt	ROU	Horia Tecău	13	3
IND	Leander Paes	CZE	Radek Štěpánek	14	4
POL	Mariusz Fyrstenberg	POL	Marcin Matkowski	21	5
PAK	Aisam-ul-Haq Qureshi	NED	Jean-Julien Rojer	30	6
IND	Mahesh Bhupathi	IND	Rohan Bopanna	33	7
AUT	Alexander Peya	BRA	Bruno Soares	50	8

- Rankings are as of October 1, 2012

=== Other entrants ===
The following pairs received wildcards into the doubles main draw:

- (China) Yu Chang / (China) Zhe Li
- (China) Maoxin Gong / (China) Zhang Ze

The following pairs received entry as alternates:

- (Italy) Fabio Fognini / (Slovakia) Martin Kližan

=== Withdrawals ===
- (United States) Ryan Harrison
