= 1978 Nice International Open =

Men's tennis tournament

- Date: 17–23 April
- Edition: 7th
- Category: Grand Prix
- Draw: 32S / 16D
- Prize money: $50,000
- Surface: Clay / outdoor
- Location: Nice, France
- Venue: Nice Lawn Tennis Club

Champions

Singles
- (Spain) José Higueras

Doubles
- (France) François Jauffret / (France) Patrice Dominguez
← 1977 ·	Open de Nice Côte d'Azur	· 1979 →

The 1978 Nice International Open, also known by its sponsored name Montano-Snauwaert International Championships, was a men's tennis tournament played on outdoor clay courts at the Nice Lawn Tennis Club in Nice, France, and was part of the 1978 Colgate-Palmolive Grand Prix. It was the seventh edition of the tournament and was held from 17 April until 23 April 1978. First-seeded José Higueras won the title.

== Finals ==
=== Singles ===
(Spain) José Higueras defeated (France) Yannick Noah 6–3, 6–4, 6–4

- It was Higueras' 2nd singles title of the year and the 4th of his career.

=== Doubles ===
(France) François Jauffret / (France) Patrice Dominguez defeated (Czechoslovakia) Jan Kodeš / (Czechoslovakia) Tomáš Šmíd 6–4, 6–0
