= 2012 Open de Nice Côte d'Azur =

- Date: 21–17 May
- Edition: 28th
- Category: World Tour 250
- Draw: 28S / 16D
- Prize money: €398,250
- Surface: Clay
- Location: Nice, France
- Venue: Nice Lawn Tennis Club

Champions

Singles
- (Spain) Nicolás Almagro

Doubles
- (United States) Bob Bryan / (United States) Mike Bryan
← 2011 ·	Open de Nice Côte d'Azur	· 2013 →

The 2012 Open de Nice Côte d'Azur was a men's tennis tournament played on outdoor clay courts. It was the 28th edition of the Open de Nice Côte d'Azur and was part of the ATP World Tour 250 series of the 2012 ATP World Tour. It took place at the Nice Lawn Tennis Club in Nice, France, from 21 May through 27 May 2012. Third-seeded Nicolás Almagro won the singles title.

== Singles main draw entrants ==
=== Seeds ===
Country	Player	Rank^{1}	Seed
USA	John Isner	10	1
FRA	Gilles Simon	12	2
ESP	Nicolás Almagro	13	3
FRA	Gaël Monfils	14	4
AUS	Bernard Tomic	32	5
NED	Robin Haase	40	6
UZB	Denis Istomin	43	7
ITA	Fabio Fognini	45	8

- Rankings as of May 14, 2012

=== Other entrants ===
The following players received wildcards into the main draw:

- (Spain) Juan Carlos Ferrero
- (France) Gaël Monfils
- (France) Benoît Paire

The following players received entry from the qualifying draw:

- (United States) Brian Baker
- (Brazil) Thomaz Bellucci
- (Bulgaria) Grigor Dimitrov
- (United States) Sam Querrey

== Doubles main draw entrants ==
=== Seeds ===
Country	Player	Country	Player	Rank^{1}	Seed
USA	Bob Bryan	USA	Mike Bryan	6	1
IND	Rohan Bopanna	ESP	David Marrero	36	2
PAK	Aisam-ul-Haq Qureshi	NED	Jean-Julien Rojer	47	3
COL	Juan Sebastián Cabal	MEX	Santiago González	55	4

- Rankings are as of May 14, 2012

=== Other entrants ===
The following pairs received wildcards into the doubles main draw:

- (United States) John Isner / (United States) Sam Querrey
- (France) Nicolas Mahut / (France) Édouard Roger-Vasselin

== Finals ==
=== Singles ===
- (Spain) Nicolás Almagro defeated (United States) Brian Baker, 6–3, 6–2

=== Doubles ===
- (United States) Bob Bryan / (United States) Mike Bryan defeated (Austria) Oliver Marach / (Slovakia) Filip Polášek, 7–6^{(7–5)}, 6–3
