= 1971 Nice International Championships =

Men's tennis tournament

- Date: 29 March – 4 April
- Edition: 1st
- Category: Grand Prix (Group D)
- Draw: 48S / 8D
- Prize money: $12,500
- Surface: Clay / outdoor
- Location: Nice, France
- Venue: Nice Lawn Tennis Club

Champions

Singles
- (Romania) Ilie Năstase

Doubles
- (Romania) Ilie Năstase / (Romania) Ion Țiriac
Open de Nice Côte d'Azur	· 1972 →

The 1971 Nice International Championships, was a men's tennis tournament played on outdoor clay courts at the Nice Lawn Tennis Club in Nice, France that was part of Group D of the 1971 Grand Prix circuit. It was the inaugural edition of the tournament and was held from 29 March until 4 April 1971. Ilie Năstase won the title.

== Finals ==
=== Singles ===
(Romania) Ilie Năstase defeated (Czechoslovakia) Jan Kodeš 10–8, 11–9, 6–1

- It was Năstase's 3rd singles title of the year and the 5th of his career.

=== Doubles ===
(Romania) Ilie Năstase / (Romania) Ion Țiriac defeated (France) Pierre Barthès / (France) François Jauffret 6–3, 6–3
