= 1977 Nice International Championships – Singles =

Singles
- 1977 Nice International Championships

Final
- Champion: (Sweden) Björn Borg
- Runner-up: (Argentina) Guillermo Vilas
- Score: 6–4, 1–6, 6–2, 6–0

Details
- Draw: 32
- Seeds: 8

Events
Singles	Doubles
- Open de Nice Côte d'Azur

The 1977 Nice International Championships – Singles was an event of the 1977 Nice International Championships tennis tournament and was played on outdoor clay courts at the Nice Lawn Tennis Club in Nice, France, between 28 March, and 3 April 1977. The draw comprised 32 players and eight of them were seeded. Corrado Barazzutti was the defending Nice International Championships singles champion but did not participate in this edition. First-seeded Björn Borg won the singles title after he defeated second-seeded Guillermo Vilas in the final, 6–4, 1–6, 6–2, 6–0.

== Seeds ==
1. (Sweden) Björn Borg (champion)
2. (Argentina) Guillermo Vilas (final)
3. (Hungary) Balázs Taróczy (semifinals)
4. (France) François Jauffret (quarterfinals)
5. (Paraguay) Víctor Pecci (semifinals)
6. (Italy) Tonino Zugarelli (first round)
7. (Australia) Dick Crealy (first round)
8. (Italy) Paolo Bertolucci (first round)

== Draw ==
Key

- Q = Qualifier
- WC = Wild card
- LL = Lucky loser
- Alt = Alternate
- ITF = ITF entry
- PR = Protected ranking
- SR = Special ranking
- SE = Special exempt
- JE = Junior exempt
- JR = Junior Accelerator Programme entrant
- CO = College Accelerator Programme entrant
- NG = Next Gen Accelerator Program entrant
- w/o = Walkover
- r = Retired
- d = Defaulted

=== Finals ===
Semifinals
1	(Sweden) Björn Borg	6	6
5	(Paraguay) Víctor Pecci	3	3
3	(Hungary) Balázs Taróczy	6	6	4
2	(Argentina) Guillermo Vilas	4	7	6

Final
1	(Sweden) Björn Borg	6	1	6	6
2	(Argentina) Guillermo Vilas	4	6	2	0

=== Top half ===
First Round
1	(Sweden) Björn Borg	6	7
(Czechoslovakia) Jiří Hřebec	2	5
(Czechoslovakia) Pavel Huťka	7	6	9
(France) Patrice Dominguez	6	7	11
7	(Australia) Dick Crealy	3	6
(Chile) Belus Prajoux	6	7
(Austria) Hans Kary	7	6
(Colombia) Iván Molina	6	2
4	(France) François Jauffret	1	6	8
(Colombia) Jairo Velasco Sr.	6	3	6
(Argentina) Ricardo Cano	6	7
(Socialist Federal Republic of Yugoslavia) Nikola Pilić	4	5
5	(Paraguay) Víctor Pecci	7	6
(West Germany) Ulrich Pinner	6	3
(West Germany) Werner Zirngibl	3	7	2
(France) Jean-François Caujolle	6	6	6

Second Round
1	(Sweden) Björn Borg	6	6
(France) Patrice Dominguez	2	1
(Chile) Belus Prajoux	6	7
(Austria) Hans Kary	0	5
4	(France) François Jauffret	6	6	6
(Argentina) Ricardo Cano	7	2	4
5	(Paraguay) Víctor Pecci	6	6
(France) Jean-François Caujolle	2	0

Quarterfinals
1	(Sweden) Björn Borg	6	6
(Chile) Belus Prajoux	4	2
4	(France) François Jauffret	6	4
5	(Paraguay) Víctor Pecci	7	6

Semifinals
1	(Sweden) Björn Borg	6	6
5	(Paraguay) Víctor Pecci	3	3

=== Bottom half ===
First Round
(France) Christophe Casa	6	6
(Australia) Peter McNamara	4	4
(France) Jean-Louis Haillet	6	6
6	(Italy) Tonino Zugarelli	4	4
(United Kingdom) Richard Lewis	2	4
(Sweden) Kjell Johansson	6	6
(Japan) Jun Kuki	3	2
3	(Hungary) Balázs Taróczy	6	6
(Chile) Hans Gildemeister	6	6
(France) Hervé Gauvain	1	4
(France) Éric Deblicker	6	2	6
8	(Italy) Paolo Bertolucci	2	6	3
(United Kingdom) Buster Mottram	6	6
(New Zealand) Chris Lewis	3	1
(France) Patrick Proisy	3	4
2	(Argentina) Guillermo Vilas	6	6

Second Round
(France) Christophe Casa	6	6	7
(France) Jean-Louis Haillet	4	7	5
(Sweden) Kjell Johansson	4	0
3	(Hungary) Balázs Taróczy	6	6
(Chile) Hans Gildemeister	6	6
(France) Éric Deblicker	4	3
(United Kingdom) Buster Mottram	5	6
2	(Argentina) Guillermo Vilas	7	7

Quarterfinals
(France) Christophe Casa	4	1
3	(Hungary) Balázs Taróczy	6	6
(Chile) Hans Gildemeister	0	6
2	(Argentina) Guillermo Vilas	6	7

Semifinals
3	(Hungary) Balázs Taróczy	6	6	4
2	(Argentina) Guillermo Vilas	4	7	6
