= 1981 Donnay Open =

Men's tennis tournament

- Date: 6–12 April
- Edition: 10th
- Category: Grand Prix
- Draw: 32S / 16D
- Prize money: $50,000
- Surface: Clay / outdoor
- Location: Nice, France
- Venue: Nice Lawn Tennis Club

Champions

Singles
- (France) Yannick Noah

Doubles
- (France) Pascal Portes / (France) Yannick Noah
← 1980 ·	Open de Nice Côte d'Azur	· 1982 →

The 1981 Donnay Open was a men's tennis tournament played on outdoor clay courts at the Nice Lawn Tennis Club in Nice, France, and was part of the 1981 Volvo Grand Prix. It was the 10th edition of the tournament and was held from 6 April until 4 April 1981. First-seeded Yannick Noah won the singles title.

== Finals ==
=== Singles ===
(France) Yannick Noah defeated (Bolivia) Mario Martínez 6–4, 6–2

- It was Noah's 2nd singles title of the year and the 7th of his career.

=== Doubles ===
(France) Pascal Portes / (France) Yannick Noah defeated (New Zealand) Chris Lewis / (Czechoslovakia) Pavel Složil 4–6, 6–3, 6–4
