= 2012 Open de Nice Côte d'Azur – Singles =

Singles
- 2012 Open de Nice Côte d'Azur

Final
- Champion: (Spain) Nicolás Almagro
- Runner-up: (United States) Brian Baker
- Score: 6–3, 6–2

Details
- Draw: 29
- Seeds: 8

Events
Singles	Doubles
- Open de Nice Côte d'Azur

Defending champion Nicolás Almagro successfully retained his title, defeating Brian Baker 6–3, 6–2 in the final.

== Seeds ==
The top four seeds received a bye into the second round.

1. (United States) John Isner (quarterfinals)
2. (France) Gilles Simon (semifinals)
3. (Spain) Nicolás Almagro (champion)
4. (France) Gaël Monfils (second round)
5. (Australia) Bernard Tomic (second round)
6. (Netherlands) Robin Haase (first round)
7. (Uzbekistan) Denis Istomin (second round)
8. (Italy) Fabio Fognini (first round)

== Draw ==
Key

- Q = Qualifier
- WC = Wild card
- LL = Lucky loser
- Alt = Alternate
- ITF = ITF entry
- PR = Protected ranking
- SR = Special ranking
- SE = Special exempt
- JE = Junior exempt
- JR = Junior Accelerator Programme entrant
- CO = College Accelerator Programme entrant
- NG = Next Gen Accelerator Program entrant
- w/o = Walkover
- r = Retired
- d = Defaulted

=== Finals ===
Semifinals
(Russia) Nikolay Davydenko	7^{7}	4	2
Q	(United States) Brian Baker	6^{5}	6	6
3	(Spain) Nicolás Almagro	6	6
2	(France) Gilles Simon	1	3

Final
Q	(United States) Brian Baker	3	2
3	(Spain) Nicolás Almagro	6	6

=== Top half ===
First round
(Belgium) X Malisse	7	6
(Chinese Taipei) Y-H Lu	5	4
(Russia) N Davydenko	6	6
(Australia) M Ebden	3	3
(Colombia) A Falla	6^{3}	6	1
7	(Uzbekistan) D Istomin	7^{7}	1	6
Q	(United States) B Baker	6^{2}	6	7
(Ukraine) S Stakhovsky	7^{7}	4	5
(Kazakhstan) M Kukushkin	6	7
Q	(United States) S Querrey	2	5
(Slovakia) L Lacko	2	3
5	(Australia) B Tomic	6	6

Second round
1	(United States) J Isner	7^{7}	7^{7}
(Belgium) X Malisse	6^{3}	6^{5}
(Russia) N Davydenko	6	1	6
7	(Uzbekistan) D Istomin	4	6	3
4/WC	(France) G Monfils	3	6^{9}
Q	(United States) B Baker	6	7^{11}
(Kazakhstan) M Kukushkin	3	6	7
5	(Australia) B Tomic	6	2	5

Quarterfinals
1	(United States) J Isner	4	6^{4}
(Russia) N Davydenko	6	7^{7}
Q	(United States) B Baker	4	6	7^{7}
(Kazakhstan) M Kukushkin	6	3	6^{4}

Semifinals
(Russia) N Davydenko	7^{7}	4	2
Q	(United States) B Baker	6^{5}	6	6

=== Bottom half ===
First round
8	(Italy) F Fognini	6^{3}	5
(Belgium) S Darcis	7^{7}	7
(Italy) F Volandri	4	7^{7}	6
(Belgium) O Rochus	6	6^{2}	2
(France) É Roger-Vasselin	6	7^{7}
WC	(France) B Paire	4	6^{2}
6	(Netherlands) R Haase	6	6^{6}	6^{6}
WC	(Spain) JC Ferrero	4	7^{8}	7^{8}
Q	(Brazil) T Bellucci	6^{5}	6	6
(United States) D Young	7^{7}	0	3
(Israel) D Sela	5	1
Q	(Bulgaria) G Dimitrov	7	6

Second round
(Belgium) S Darcis	3	6	6
(Italy) F Volandri	6	2	4
(France) É Roger-Vasselin	6^{5}	4
3	(Spain) N Almagro	7^{7}	6
WC	(Spain) JC Ferrero	4	3
Q	(Brazil) T Bellucci	6	6
Q	(Bulgaria) G Dimitrov	3	3
2	(France) G Simon	6	6

Quarterfinals
(Belgium) S Darcis	4	4
3	(Spain) N Almagro	6	6
Q	(Brazil) T Bellucci	5	0
2	(France) G Simon	7	6

Semifinals
3	(Spain) N Almagro	6	6
2	(France) G Simon	1	3

== Qualifying ==
=== Seeds ===
1. (Brazil) Thomaz Bellucci (qualified)
2. (Italy) Flavio Cipolla (first round)
3. (Tunisia) Malek Jaziri (first round)
4. (United States) Sam Querrey (qualified)
5. (Germany) Cedrik-Marcel Stebe (qualifying competition)
6. (Bulgaria) Grigor Dimitrov (qualified)
7. (Canada) Vasek Pospisil (first round)
8. (Romania) Victor Hănescu (first round)

=== Qualifiers ===
1. (Brazil) Thomaz Bellucci
2. (Bulgaria) Grigor Dimitrov
3. (United States) Brian Baker
4. (United States) Sam Querrey

=== Qualifying draw ===
==== First qualifier ====
First round
1	(Brazil) Thomaz Bellucci	7^{7}	6
(Germany) Mischa Zverev	6^{3}	4
(Slovakia) Kamil Čapkovič	4	2
(Russia) Andrey Kuznetsov	6	6
(United States) Rajeev Ram	3	3
(Spain) Gerard Granollers	6	6
WC	(France) Jonathan Eysseric	6^{9}	6	6
7	(Canada) Vasek Pospisil	7^{11}	2	3

Second round
1	(Brazil) Thomaz Bellucci	7	7
(Russia) Andrey Kuznetsov	5	5
(Spain) Gerard Granollers	4	6	6
WC	(France) Jonathan Eysseric	6	4	2

Qualifying competition
1	(Brazil) Thomaz Bellucci	6	6
(Spain) Gerard Granollers	2	1

==== Second qualifier ====
First round
2	(Italy) Flavio Cipolla	6^{7}	6	4
(France) Kenny de Schepper	7^{9}	2	6
WC	(Monaco) Benjamin Balleret	1	1
(France) Éric Prodon	6	6
(Kazakhstan) Evgeny Korolev	4	1
(Brazil) João Souza	6	6
WC	(France) Alexandre Sidorenko	5	5
6	(Bulgaria) Grigor Dimitrov	7	7

Second round
(France) Kenny de Schepper	3	3
(France) Éric Prodon	6	6
(Brazil) João Souza	3	6^{3}
6	(Bulgaria) Grigor Dimitrov	6	7

Qualifying competition
(France) Éric Prodon	6	1	4
6	(Bulgaria) Grigor Dimitrov	4	6	6

==== Third qualifier ====
First round
3	(Tunisia) Malek Jaziri	6^{8}	5
(France) David Guez	7^{10}	7
(United States) Brian Baker	6	6
(Serbia) Ilija Bozoljac	1	1
(France) Adrian Mannarino	6	3	5
(Colombia) Alejandro González	2	6	7
(Slovakia) Pavol Červenák	6	7^{7}
8	(Romania) Victor Hănescu	2	6^{4}

Second round
(France) David Guez	3	2
(United States) Brian Baker	6	6
(Colombia) Alejandro González	3	6	6
(Slovakia) Pavol Červenák	6	4	3

Qualifying competition
(United States) Brian Baker	6	6
(Colombia) Alejandro González	3	3

==== Fourth qualifier ====
First round
4	(United States) Sam Querrey	6	6
(Australia) Carsten Ball	2	4
WC	(France) Alexandre Pierson	4	6^{0}
(Netherlands) Igor Sijsling	6	7^{7}
(Colombia) Juan Sebastián Cabal	3	0
(Spain) Daniel Gimeno Traver	6	6
(Germany) Benjamin Becker	3	5
5	(Germany) Cedrik-Marcel Stebe	6	7

Second round
4	(United States) Sam Querrey	6	6
(Netherlands) Igor Sijsling	4	3
(Spain) Daniel Gimeno Traver	6	3	4
5	(Germany) Cedrik-Marcel Stebe	4	6	6

Qualifying competition
4	(United States) Sam Querrey	6	6
5	(Germany) Cedrik-Marcel Stebe	4	2
