= 1976 Nice International Championships =

Men's tennis tournament

- Date: 4–11 April
- Edition: 5th
- Category: Non-tour
- Draw: 51S / 28D
- Prize money: $30,000
- Surface: Clay / outdoor
- Location: Nice, France
- Venue: Nice Lawn Tennis Club

Champions

Singles
- (Italy) Corrado Barazzutti

Doubles
- (France) Patrice Dominguez / (France) François Jauffret
← 1975 ·	Open de Nice Côte d'Azur	· 1977 →

The 1976 Nice International Championships, was a men's tennis tournament played on outdoor clay courts at the Nice Lawn Tennis Club in Nice, France. It was a non-tour event, i.e. not part of the Grand Prix or World Championships Tennis circuits. It was the fifth edition of the tournament and was held from 4 April until 11 April 1976. Third-seeded Corrado Barazzutti won the title.

== Finals ==
=== Singles ===
(Italy) Corrado Barazzutti defeated (Czechoslovakia) Jan Kodeš 6–2, 2–6, 5–7, 7–6, 8–6

- It was Barazzutti's first singles title of his career.

=== Doubles ===
(France) Patrice Dominguez / (France) François Jauffret defeated (Poland) Wojciech Fibak / (West Germany) Karl Meiler 6–4, 3–6, 6–3
