= 1973 Craven International Championships =

Men's tennis tournament

- Date: 9–15 April
- Edition: 3rd
- Category: Spring Mediterranean Circuit
- Draw: 32S / 16D
- Prize money: $20,000
- Surface: Clay / outdoor
- Location: Nice, France
- Venue: Nice Lawn Tennis Club

Champions

Singles
- (Spain) Manuel Orantes

Doubles
- (Spain) Manuel Orantes / (Spain) Juan Gisbert Sr.
← 1972 ·	Open de Nice Côte d'Azur	· 1975 →

The 1973 Craven International Championships, was a men's tennis tournament played on outdoor clay courts at the Nice Lawn Tennis Club in Nice, France that was part of the Rothmans Spring Mediterranean Circuit. It was the third edition of the tournament and was held from 9 April until 15 April 1973. Manuel Orantes won the title and earned $4,000 first-prize money.

== Finals ==
=== Singles ===
(Spain) Manuel Orantes defeated (Italy) Adriano Panatta 7–6, 5–7, 4–6, 7–6, 12–10

- It was Orantes' 2nd singles title of the year and the 12th of his career.

=== Doubles ===
(Spain) Manuel Orantes / (Spain) Juan Gisbert Sr. defeated (France) Patrice Beust / (France) Daniel Contet 7–5, 6–1
