= 1980 Nice International Open =

Men's tennis tournament

- Date: 24–30 March
- Edition: 9th
- Category: Grand Prix
- Draw: 32S / 16D
- Prize money: $50,000
- Surface: Clay / outdoor
- Location: Nice, France
- Venue: Nice Lawn Tennis Club

Champions

Singles
- (Sweden) Björn Borg

Doubles
- (Australia) Kim Warwick / (United States) Chris Delaney
← 1979 ·	Open de Nice Côte d'Azur	· 1981 →

The 1980 Nice International Open was a men's tennis tournament played on outdoor clay courts at the Nice Lawn Tennis Club in Nice, France, and was part of the 1980 Volvo Grand Prix. It was the ninth edition of the tournament and was held from 24 March until 30 March 1980. First-seeded Björn Borg won his second singles title at the event after 1977.

== Finals ==
=== Singles ===
(Sweden) Björn Borg defeated (Spain) Manuel Orantes 6–2, 6–0, 6–1

- It was Borg's 3rd singles title of the year and the 55th of his career.

=== Doubles ===
(Australia) Kim Warwick / (United States) Chris Delaney defeated (Czechoslovakia) Stanislav Birner / (Czechoslovakia) Jiří Hřebec 6–4, 6–0
