= 1975 Nice International Championships =

Men's tennis tournament

- Date: 5–11 May
- Edition: 4th
- Category: European Winter Circuit
- Draw: 48S / 16D
- Prize money: $25,000
- Surface: Clay / outdoor
- Location: Nice, France
- Venue: Nice Lawn Tennis Club

Champions

Singles
- (Australia) Dick Crealy

Doubles
- (Mexico) Marcello Lara / (Mexico) Joaquín Loyo Mayo
| ← 1973 · | Open de Nice Côte d'Azur | · 1976 → |

The 1975 Nice International Championships, was a men's tennis tournament played on outdoor clay courts at the Nice Lawn Tennis Club in Nice, France that was part of the ATP European Winter Circuit. It was the fourth edition of the tournament and was held from 5 May until 11 May 1975. Second-seeded Dick Crealy won the title.

== Finals ==
=== Singles ===
(Australia) Dick Crealy defeated (Colombia) Iván Molina 7–6, 6–4, 6–3

- It was Crealy's first singles title of the year and the second of his career.

=== Doubles ===
(Mexico) Marcello Lara / (Mexico) Joaquín Loyo-Mayo defeated (Colombia) Iván Molina / (Colombia) Jairo Velasco Sr. 7–6, 6–7, 8–6
