= 1984 Nice International Open =

- Date: 9–15 April
- Edition: 13th
- Category: Grand Prix
- Draw: 32S / 16D
- Prize money: $75,000
- Surface: Clay / outdoor
- Location: Nice, France
- Venue: Nice Lawn Tennis Club

Champions

Singles
- (Ecuador) Andrés Gómez

Doubles
- (Sweden) Jan Gunnarsson (Denmark) Michael Mortensen
- Open de Nice Côte d'Azur

The 1984 Nice International Open was a men's tennis tournament played on outdoor clay courts at the Nice Lawn Tennis Club in Nice, France, and was part of the 1984 Volvo Grand Prix. It was the 13th edition of the tournament and was held from 9 April through 15 April 1984. Fifth-seeded Andrés Gómez won the singles title.

== Finals ==
=== Singles ===
(Ecuador) Andrés Gómez defeated (Sweden) Henrik Sundström 6–1, 6–4

- It was Gómez' first singles title of the year and the fifth of his career.

=== Doubles ===
(Sweden) Jan Gunnarsson / (Denmark) Michael Mortensen defeated (Chile) Hans Gildemeister / (Ecuador) Andrés Gómez 6–1, 7–5
