= 2014 Open de Nice Côte d'Azur – Singles =

Singles
- 2014 Open de Nice Côte d'Azur

Final
- Champion: (Latvia) Ernests Gulbis
- Runner-up: (Argentina) Federico Delbonis
- Score: 6–1, 7–6^{(7–5)}

Details
- Draw: 28
- Seeds: 8

Events
Singles	Doubles
- Open de Nice Côte d'Azur

Albert Montañés was the defending champion, but lost to Ernests Gulbis in the semifinals. Gulbis went on to win the title, defeating Federico Delbonis in the final, 6–1, 7–6^{(7–5)}.

== Seeds ==
The top four seeds receive a bye into the second round.

1. (United States) John Isner (quarterfinals)
2. (Latvia) Ernests Gulbis (champion)
3. (France) Gaël Monfils (withdrew)
4. (France) Gilles Simon (semifinals)
5. (Russia) Dmitry Tursunov (quarterfinals)
6. (France) Nicolas Mahut (second round)
7. (Argentina) Federico Delbonis (final)
8. (France) Édouard Roger-Vasselin (second round)

== Draw ==
Key

- Q = Qualifier
- WC = Wild card
- LL = Lucky loser
- Alt = Alternate
- ITF = ITF entry
- PR = Protected ranking
- SR = Special ranking
- SE = Special exempt
- JE = Junior exempt
- JR = Junior Accelerator Programme entrant
- CO = College Accelerator Programme entrant
- NG = Next Gen Accelerator Program entrant
- w/o = Walkover
- r = Retired
- d = Defaulted

=== Finals ===
Semifinals
7	(Argentina) Federico Delbonis	6	6
4	(France) Gilles Simon	2	4
(Spain) Albert Montañés	0	3
2	(Latvia) Ernests Gulbis	6	6

Final
7	(Argentina) Federico Delbonis	1	6^{5}
2	(Latvia) Ernests Gulbis	6	7^{7}

=== Top half ===
First round
(France) K de Schepper	4	2
Q	(United States) J Sock	6	6
Q	(France) L Pouille	6	4	0
WC	(France) P-H Mathieu	2	6	6
(Kazakhstan) M Kukushkin	5	3
7	(Argentina) F Delbonis	7	6
(United States) S Johnson	6	6^{5}	5
(Austria) D Thiem	3	7^{7}	7
(France) J Benneteau	1	6	3
(Argentina) C Berlocq	6	4	6
Q	(France) M Vaïsse	7^{7}	3	2
6	(France) N Mahut	6^{4}	6	6

Second round
1	(United States) J Isner	6	6
Q	(United States) J Sock	4	3
WC	(France) P-H Mathieu	2	4
7	(Argentina) F Delbonis	6	6
4	(France) G Simon	6	4	6
(Austria) D Thiem	3	6	2
(Argentina) C Berlocq	6	6
6	(France) N Mahut	2	3

Quarterfinals
1	(United States) J Isner	4	7	6^{6}
7	(Argentina) F Delbonis	6	5	7^{8}
4	(France) G Simon	6	6
(Argentina) C Berlocq	4	1

Semifinals
7	(Argentina) F Delbonis	6	6
4	(France) G Simon	2	4

=== Bottom half ===
First round
8	(France) É Roger-Vasselin	6	6
(Colombia) A González	3	1
Q	(Argentina) L Mayer	4	6	6
WC	(Croatia) B Ćorić	6	3	4
(Spain) A Montañés	6	6
(Australia) M Ebden	1	3
5	(Russia) D Tursunov	6	6
(Kazakhstan) O Nedovyesov	1	4
(Italy) F Volandri	3	2
(Netherlands) R Haase	6	6
(Australia) B Tomic	6	3	4
(Slovakia) M Kližan	4	6	6

Second round
8	(France) É Roger-Vasselin	4	6	5
Q	(Argentina) L Mayer	6	3	7
(Spain) A Montañés	4	6	6
LL	(United States) S Querrey	6	3	2
5	(Russia) D Tursunov	6	6
(Netherlands) R Haase	3	4
(Slovakia) M Kližan	7^{7}	4	1
2	(Latvia) E Gulbis	6^{4}	6	6

Quarterfinals
Q	(Argentina) L Mayer	7^{8}	4	4
(Spain) A Montañés	6^{6}	6	6
5	(Russia) D Tursunov	3	6	6^{5}
2	(Latvia) E Gulbis	6	3	7^{7}

Semifinals
(Spain) A Montañés	0	3
2	(Latvia) E Gulbis	6	6

== Qualifying ==
=== Seeds ===
1. (United States) Sam Querrey (qualifying competition, Lucky loser)
2. (Argentina) Leonardo Mayer (qualified)
3. (United States) Jack Sock (qualified)
4. (United States) Donald Young (qualifying competition)
5. (India) Somdev Devvarman (first round)
6. (Spain) Albert Ramos (second round)
7. (France) Pierre-Hugues Herbert (second round)
8. (France) Albano Olivetti (first round)

=== Qualifiers ===
1. (France) Martin Vaïsse
2. (Argentina) Leonardo Mayer
3. (United States) Jack Sock
4. (France) Lucas Pouille

=== Lucky losers ===
1. (United States) Sam Querrey

=== Qualifying draw ===
==== First qualifier ====
First round
1	(United States) Sam Querrey	6	7^{7}
(France) Gianni Mina	3	6^{4}
WC	(France) Alexandre Massa	1	2
(Monaco) Romain Arneodo	6	6
(France) Martin Vaïsse	2	7^{9}	6
(Croatia) Ante Pavić	6	6^{7}	1
WC	(Ukraine) Sergei Bubka	1	1
6	(Spain) Albert Ramos	6	6

Second round
1	(United States) Sam Querrey	6	7
(Monaco) Romain Arneodo	3	5
(France) Martin Vaïsse	6	6
6	(Spain) Albert Ramos	3	2

Qualifying competition
1	(United States) Sam Querrey	6^{4}	4
(France) Martin Vaïsse	7^{7}	6

==== Second qualifier ====
First round
2	(Argentina) Leonardo Mayer	7^{7}	6
(France) Florent Serra	6^{3}	3
(Romania) Victor Crivoi	5	3
(Chile) Gonzalo Lama	7	6
(Switzerland) Yann Marti	6	1	6
(Austria) Dennis Novak	0	6	4
WC	(France) Jonathan Gomont	1	1
7	(France) Pierre-Hugues Herbert	6	6

Second round
2	(Argentina) Leonardo Mayer	3	6	6
(Chile) Gonzalo Lama	6	4	1
(Switzerland) Yann Marti	6	7^{12}
7	(France) Pierre-Hugues Herbert	3	6^{10}

Qualifying competition
2	(Argentina) Leonardo Mayer	6	6
(Switzerland) Yann Marti	2	3

==== Third qualifier ====
First round
3	(United States) Jack Sock	6	6
(Italy) Salvatore Caruso	2	0
WC	(Germany) Christian Mohs	0^{r}
(Italy) Simone Vagnozzi	4
(France) Axel Michon	6	1	0
(Croatia) Antonio Veić	3	6	6
(Sweden) Elias Ymer	2	6	7
8	(France) Albano Olivetti	6	3	5

Second round
3	(United States) Jack Sock	6	6
(Italy) Simone Vagnozzi	0	4
(Croatia) Antonio Veić	6	6
(Sweden) Elias Ymer	1	1

Qualifying competition
3	(United States) Jack Sock	7^{8}	6
(Croatia) Antonio Veić	6^{6}	3

==== Fourth qualifier ====
First round
4	(United States) Donald Young	6	6
(Italy) Walter Trusendi	1	3
(Monaco) Benjamin Balleret	6	6
(Republic of Ireland) James McGee	3	3
(United States) Robby Ginepri	5	2
(Croatia) Mate Pavić	7	6
(France) Lucas Pouille	6	6^{5}	6
5	(India) Somdev Devvarman	2	7^{7}	3

Second round
4	(United States) Donald Young	6	6
(Monaco) Benjamin Balleret	3	3
(Croatia) Mate Pavić	3	4
(France) Lucas Pouille	6	6

Qualifying competition
4	(United States) Donald Young	1	2
(France) Lucas Pouille	6	6
