= 2015 Open de Nice Côte d'Azur =

- Date: 17–23 May
- Edition: 31st
- Category: ATP World Tour 250
- Draw: 28S / 16D
- Prize money: €439,405
- Surface: Clay
- Location: Nice, France
- Venue: Nice Lawn Tennis Club

Champions

Singles
- (Austria) Dominic Thiem

Doubles
- (Croatia) Mate Pavić / (New Zealand) Michael Venus
← 2014 ·	Open de Nice Côte d'Azur	· 2016 →

The 2015 Open de Nice Côte d'Azur was a men's tennis tournament played on outdoor clay courts. It was the 31st edition of the Open de Nice Côte d'Azur and part of the ATP World Tour 250 series of the 2015 ATP World Tour. It took place at the Nice Lawn Tennis Club in Nice, France, from 17 May through 23 May 2015.

== Singles main-draw entrants ==
=== Seeds ===
Country	Player	Rank^{1}	Seed
~~FRA~~	~~Gilles Simon~~	~~12~~	~~1~~
USA	John Isner	17	2
LAT	Ernests Gulbis	22	3
ARG	Leonardo Mayer	25	4
AUS	Bernard Tomic	27	5
AUS	Nick Kyrgios	30	6
USA	Jack Sock	33	7
ARG	Juan Mónaco	36	8

- Rankings are as of May 11, 2015.

=== Other entrants ===
The following players received wildcards into the singles main draw:

- (France) Maxime Hamou
- (Australia) Thanasi Kokkinakis
- (France) Lucas Pouille

The following players received entry from the qualifying draw:

- (Belgium) Ruben Bemelmans
- (Australia) Sam Groth
- (France) Gianni Mina
- (New Zealand) Michael Venus

The following players received entry as lucky losers:

- (France) Quentin Halys
- (United States) Frances Tiafoe

=== Withdrawals ===
Before the tournament

- (Italy) Simone Bolelli →replaced by Dušan Lajović
- (Spain) Guillermo García López →replaced by James Duckworth
- (Slovakia) Martin Kližan →replaced by Benoît Paire
- (Australia) Thanasi Kokkinakis →replaced by Frances Tiafoe
- (Argentina) Diego Schwartzman →replaced by Alexandr Dolgopolov
- (France) Gilles Simon →replaced by Quentin Halys

=== Retirements ===
- (Australia) Nick Kyrgios
- (Australia) Bernard Tomic

== Doubles main-draw entrants ==
=== Seeds ===
Country	Player	Country	Player	Rank^{1}	Seed
NED	Jean-Julien Rojer	ROU	Horia Tecău	25	1
CAN	Daniel Nestor	AUT	Alexander Peya	34	2
USA	Eric Butorac	AUS	Sam Groth	74	3
ESP	David Marrero	PAK	Aisam-ul-Haq Qureshi	82	4

- Rankings are as of May 11, 2015.

=== Other entrants ===
The following pairs received wildcards into the doubles main draw:

- (Chinese Taipei) Hsieh Cheng-peng / (Chinese Taipei) Wang Chieh-fu
- (France) Benoît Paire / (France) Lucas Pouille

=== Withdrawals ===
Before the tournament

- (Australia) Bernard Tomic

== Finals ==
=== Singles ===
- (Austria) Dominic Thiem defeated (Argentina) Leonardo Mayer, 6–7^{(8–10)}, 7–5, 7–6^{(7–2)}

=== Doubles ===
- (Croatia) Mate Pavić / (New Zealand) Michael Venus defeated (Netherlands) Jean-Julien Rojer / (Romania) Horia Tecău, 7–6^{(7–4)}, 2–6, [10–8]
