= 2013 Open de Nice Côte d'Azur – Doubles =

Doubles
- 2013 Open de Nice Côte d'Azur

Final
- Champions: (Sweden) Johan Brunström (South Africa) Raven Klaasen
- Runners-up: (Colombia) Juan Sebastián Cabal (Colombia) Robert Farah
- Score: 6–3, 6–2

Events
Singles	Doubles
← 2012 ·	Open de Nice Côte d'Azur	· 2014 →

Bob Bryan and Mike Bryan were the defending champions but decided not to participate.
Johan Brunström and Raven Klaasen won the title, defeating Juan Sebastián Cabal and Robert Farah in the final, 6–3, 6–2.

== Seeds ==
1. (Pakistan) Aisam-ul-Haq Qureshi / (Netherlands) Jean-Julien Rojer (quarterfinals)
2. (Poland) Mariusz Fyrstenberg / (Poland) Marcin Matkowski (first round)
3. (United States) Eric Butorac / (Czech Republic) Lukáš Dlouhý (quarterfinals)
4. (Italy) Daniele Bracciali / (Italy) Potito Starace (first round)

== Draw ==
=== Key ===
- Q = Qualifier
- WC = Wild card
- LL = Lucky loser
- Alt = Alternate
- SE = Special exempt
- PR = Protected ranking
- ITF = ITF entry
- JE = Junior exempt
- w/o = Walkover
- r = Retired
- d = Defaulted
- SR = Special ranking

=== Draw ===
First round
1	(Pakistan) A-u-H Qureshi (Netherlands) J-J Rojer	6	6
(United States) J Cerretani (Romania) V Hănescu	3	1
(France) N Mahut (France) É Roger-Vasselin	4	6	[12]
(Australia) L Hewitt (Australia) M Matosevic	6	1	[10]
3	(United States) E Butorac (Czech Republic) L Dlouhý	6	6
WC	(France) A Massa (France) A Pierson	2	2
Alt	(Czech Republic) J Levinský (Chinese Taipei) Y-h Lu	2	4
(Colombia) JS Cabal (Colombia) R Farah	6	6
(Argentina) C Berlocq (Argentina) L Mayer	2	6	[3]
(Czech Republic) F Čermák (Slovakia) M Mertiňák	6	4	[10]
(Sweden) J Brunström (South Africa) R Klaasen	4	7	[11]
4	(Italy) D Bracciali (Italy) P Starace	6	5	[9]
(Italy) A Seppi (United Kingdom) K Skupski	6^{6}	4
(Russia) M Elgin (Uzbekistan) D Istomin	7^{8}	6
WC	(Spain) P Andújar (Spain) A Ramos	6	6
2	(Poland) M Fyrstenberg (Poland) M Matkowski	3	3

Quarterfinals
1	(Pakistan) A-u-H Qureshi (Netherlands) J-J Rojer	6	5	[3]
(France) N Mahut (France) É Roger-Vasselin	3	7	[10]
3	(United States) E Butorac (Czech Republic) L Dlouhý	2	6	[6]
(Colombia) JS Cabal (Colombia) R Farah	6	3	[10]
(Czech Republic) F Čermák (Slovakia) M Mertiňák	3	2
(Sweden) J Brunström (South Africa) R Klaasen	6	6
(Russia) M Elgin (Uzbekistan) D Istomin	6	6
WC	(Spain) P Andújar (Spain) A Ramos	4	4

Semifinals
(France) N Mahut (France) É Roger-Vasselin	3	6	[6]
(Colombia) JS Cabal (Colombia) R Farah	6	1	[10]
(Sweden) J Brunström (South Africa) R Klaasen	6	3	[10]
(Russia) M Elgin (Uzbekistan) D Istomin	2	6	[8]

Final
(Colombia) JS Cabal (Colombia) R Farah	3	2
(Sweden) J Brunström (South Africa) R Klaasen	6	6
