= 2013 Open de Nice Côte d'Azur =

- Date: 19–25 May
- Edition: 29th
- Category: ATP World Tour 250
- Draw: 28S / 16D
- Prize money: €467,800
- Surface: Clay
- Location: Nice, France
- Venue: Nice Lawn Tennis Club

Champions

Singles
- (Spain) Albert Montañés

Doubles
- (Sweden) Johan Brunström / (South Africa) Raven Klaasen
← 2012 ·	Open de Nice Côte d'Azur	· 2014 →

The 2013 Open de Nice Côte d'Azur was a men's tennis tournament played on outdoor clay courts. It was the 29th edition of the Open de Nice Côte d'Azur and was part of the ATP World Tour 250 series of the 2013 ATP World Tour. It took place at the Nice Lawn Tennis Club in Nice, France, from May 19 through May 25, 2013.

== Singles main-draw entrants ==
=== Seeds ===
Country	Player	Rank^{1}	Seed
~~CZE~~	~~Tomáš Berdych~~	~~6~~	~~1~~
FRA	Gilles Simon	17	2
USA	Sam Querrey	19	3
USA	John Isner	20	4
ITA	Andreas Seppi	21	5
ITA	Fabio Fognini	25	6
~~ESP~~	~~Marcel Granollers~~	~~37~~	~~7~~
UZB	Denis Istomin	45	8

- Rankings are as of May 13, 2013.

=== Other entrants ===
The following players received wildcards into the singles main draw:

- (Australia) Lleyton Hewitt
- (France) Gaël Monfils
- (France) Édouard Roger-Vasselin

The following players received entry from the qualifying draw:

- (Italy) Marco Cecchinato
- (Brazil) Rogério Dutra da Silva
- (France) Guillaume Rufin
- (Ukraine) Sergiy Stakhovsky

The following player received entry as a lucky loser:

- (United States) Ryan Harrison

The following player received entry as an alternate:

- (Spain) Albert Montañés

=== Withdrawals ===
Before the tournament

- (United States) Brian Baker
- (Czech Republic) Tomáš Berdych (fatigue)
- (Australia) Bernard Tomic (personal reasons)
- (Spain) Marcel Granollers (shoulder injury)
- (Belgium) Xavier Malisse
- (France) Benoît Paire

=== Retirements ===
- (Colombia) Alejandro Falla (right calf injury)

== Doubles main-draw entrants ==
=== Seeds ===
Country	Player	Country	Player	Rank^{1}	Seed
PAK	Aisam-ul-Haq Qureshi	NED	Jean-Julien Rojer	15	1
POL	Mariusz Fyrstenberg	POL	Marcin Matkowski	61	2
USA	Eric Butorac	CZE	Lukáš Dlouhý	83	3
ITA	Daniele Bracciali	ITA	Potito Starace	86	4

- Rankings are as of May 13, 2013.

=== Other entrants ===
The following pairs received wildcards into the doubles main draw:

- (Spain) Pablo Andújar / (Spain) Albert Ramos
- (France) Alexandre Massa / (France) Alexandre Pierson

The following pair received entry as alternates:

- (Czech Republic) Jaroslav Levinský / (Chinese Taipei) Lu Yen-hsun

=== Withdrawals ===
Before the tournament

- (Colombia) Alejandro Falla (right calf injury)

== Finals ==
=== Singles ===
- (Spain) Albert Montañés defeated (France) Gaël Monfils, 6–0, 7–6^{(7–3)}

=== Doubles ===
- (Sweden) Johan Brunström / (South Africa) Raven Klaasen defeated (Colombia) Juan Sebastián Cabal / (Colombia) Robert Farah, 6–3, 6–2
