= 2015 Open de Nice Côte d'Azur – Singles =

Singles
- 2015 Open de Nice Côte d'Azur

Final
- Champion: (Austria) Dominic Thiem
- Runner-up: (Argentina) Leonardo Mayer
- Score: 6–7^{(8–10)}, 7–5, 7–6^{(7–2)}

Details
- Draw: 28
- Seeds: 8

Events
Singles	Doubles
- Open de Nice Côte d'Azur

Ernests Gulbis was the defending champion, but lost to Dominic Thiem in the quarterfinals.
Thiem went on to win his first ATP title, defeating Leonardo Mayer in the final, 6–7^{(8–10)}, 7–5, 7–6^{(7–2)}.

== Seeds ==
The top four seeds receive a bye into the second round.

1. (France) Gilles Simon (withdrew)
2. (United States) John Isner (semifinals)
3. (Latvia) Ernests Gulbis (quarterfinals)
4. (Argentina) Leonardo Mayer (final)
5. (Australia) Bernard Tomic (first round, retired due to a virus)
6. (Australia) Nick Kyrgios (second round, retired due to an elbow injury)
7. (United States) Jack Sock (first round)
8. (Argentina) Juan Mónaco (quarterfinals)

== Draw ==
Key

- Q = Qualifier
- WC = Wild card
- LL = Lucky loser
- Alt = Alternate
- ITF = ITF entry
- PR = Protected ranking
- SR = Special ranking
- SE = Special exempt
- JE = Junior exempt
- JR = Junior Accelerator Programme entrant
- CO = College Accelerator Programme entrant
- NG = Next Gen Accelerator Program entrant
- w/o = Walkover
- r = Retired
- d = Defaulted

=== Finals ===
Semifinals
(Croatia) Borna Ćorić	4	3
4	(Argentina) Leonardo Mayer	6	6
(Austria) Dominic Thiem	7^{7}	6
2	(United States) John Isner	6^{5}	3

Final
4	(Argentina) Leonardo Mayer	7^{10}	5	6^{2}
(Austria) Dominic Thiem	6^{8}	7	7^{7}

=== Top half ===
First round
LL	(United States) F Tiafoe	7^{7}	5	2
(Australia) J Duckworth	6^{5}	7	6
(Croatia) B Ćorić	7	6
Q	(Australia) S Groth	5	3
Q	(France) G Mina	6	0
5	(Australia) B Tomic	2	0^{r}
WC	(France) L Pouille	6	6
(United States) T Smyczek	3	0
(United States) S Querrey	6	6
Q	(Belgium) R Bemelmans	2	3
(France) B Paire	4	2
8	(Argentina) J Mónaco	6	6

Second round
LL	(France) Q Halys	6^{0}	6^{5}
(Australia) J Duckworth	7^{7}	7^{7}
(Croatia) B Ćorić	7^{7}	6
Q	(France) G Mina	6^{4}	3
4	(Argentina) L Mayer	6	6
WC	(France) L Pouille	4	0
(United States) S Querrey	3	1
8	(Argentina) J Mónaco	6	6

Quarterfinals
(Australia) J Duckworth	3	6^{3}
(Croatia) B Ćorić	6	7^{7}
4	(Argentina) L Mayer	6	6
8	(Argentina) J Mónaco	3	4

Semifinals
(Croatia) B Ćorić	4	3
4	(Argentina) L Mayer	6	6

=== Bottom half ===
First round
6	(Australia) N Kyrgios	7^{7}	6
(Kazakhstan) M Kukushkin	6^{5}	2
(Dominican Republic) V Estrella Burgos	6^{5}	2
(Austria) D Thiem	7^{7}	6
(Ukraine) A Dolgopolov	3	7	6
(Ukraine) S Stakhovsky	6	5	2
7	(United States) J Sock	7	5	1
(Serbia) D Lajović	5	7	6
(Spain) P Carreño Busta	6	6
WC	(France) M Hamou	2	2
(United States) S Johnson	7	6
Q	(New Zealand) M Venus	5	3

Second round
6	(Australia) N Kyrgios	3^{r}
(Austria) D Thiem	4
(Ukraine) A Dolgopolov	5	6	1
3	(Latvia) E Gulbis	7	4	6
(Serbia) D Lajović	6	4	7
(Spain) P Carreño Busta	3	6	5
(United States) S Johnson	6^{3}	6	3
2	(United States) J Isner	7^{7}	4	6

Quarterfinals
(Austria) D Thiem	6	6
3	(Latvia) E Gulbis	2	4
(Serbia) D Lajović	6^{3}	4
2	(United States) J Isner	7^{7}	6

Semifinals
(Austria) D Thiem	7^{7}	6
2	(United States) J Isner	6^{5}	3

== Qualifying ==
=== Seeds ===
1. (Australia) Sam Groth (qualified)
2. (Belgium) Ruben Bemelmans (qualified)
3. (France) Gianni Mina (qualified)
4. (Croatia) Ante Pavić (qualifying competition)
5. (United States) Frances Tiafoe (qualifying competition, lucky loser)
6. (France) Quentin Halys (qualifying competition, withdrew, lucky loser)
7. (France) Fabrice Martin (second round)
8. (Austria) Bastian Trinker (second round)

=== Qualifiers ===
1. (Australia) Sam Groth
2. (Belgium) Ruben Bemelmans
3. (France) Gianni Mina
4. (New Zealand) Michael Venus

=== Lucky losers ===
1. (United States) Frances Tiafoe
2. (France) Quentin Halys

=== Qualifying draw ===
==== First qualifier ====
First round				Second round				Qualifying competition
				1	(Australia) Sam Groth	7^{7}	6
	(France) Maxime Teixeira	6	6		(France) Maxime Teixeira	6^{3}	2
WC	(France) Alexandre Massa	3	3					1	(Australia) Sam Groth	w/o
	(Argentina) Guillermo Durán	w/o						6	(France) Quentin Halys
WC	(Russia) Alexander Bublik				(Argentina) Guillermo Durán	4	6^{3}
				6	(France) Quentin Halys	6	7^{7}

==== Second qualifier ====
First round				Second round					Qualifying competition
				2	(Belgium) Ruben Bemelmans	7^{9}	6^{0}	7
	(New Zealand) Marcus Daniell	0	2		(Belgium) Yannik Reuter	6^{7}	7^{7}	5
	(Belgium) Yannik Reuter	6	6						2	(Belgium) Ruben Bemelmans	6	6
WC	(France) Gabriel Petit	2	4						5	(United States) Frances Tiafoe	3	3
	(Russia) Daniil Medvedev	6	6		(Russia) Daniil Medvedev	3	2
				5	(United States) Frances Tiafoe	6	6

==== Third qualifier ====
First round				Second round					Qualifying competition
				3	(France) Gianni Mina	2	6	6
(Brazil) André Sá	0	1			(Croatia) Mate Pavić	6	3	3
(Croatia) Mate Pavić	6	6							3	(France) Gianni Mina	4	6	6
(Chinese Taipei) Wang Chieh-fu	1	7^{7}	2							(Russia) Philipp Davydenko	6	4	3
(Russia) Philipp Davydenko	6	6^{5}	6		(Russia) Philipp Davydenko	7^{9}	7^{7}
				8	(Austria) Bastian Trinker	6^{7}	6^{5}

==== Fourth qualifier ====
First round					Second round				Qualifying competition
					4	(Croatia) Ante Pavić	6	6
WC	(France) Louis Tessa	3	4			(United States) Eric Butorac	2	2
	(United States) Eric Butorac	6	6						4	(Croatia) Ante Pavić	6	6^{5}	4
	(New Zealand) Michael Venus	6	3	6						(New Zealand) Michael Venus	3	7^{7}	6
	(Italy) Gianluca Mager	4	6	3		(New Zealand) Michael Venus	6	7
					7	(France) Fabrice Martin	3	5
