= 2014 Open de Nice Côte d'Azur =

- Date: 18–24 May
- Edition: 30th
- Category: ATP World Tour 250
- Draw: 28S / 16D
- Prize money: €426,605
- Surface: Clay
- Location: Nice, France
- Venue: Nice Lawn Tennis Club

Champions

Singles
- (Latvia) Ernests Gulbis

Doubles
- (Slovakia) Martin Kližan / (Austria) Philipp Oswald
| ← 2013 · | Open de Nice Côte d'Azur | · 2015 → |

The 2014 Open de Nice Côte d'Azur was a men's tennis tournament played on outdoor clay courts. It was the 30th edition of the Open de Nice Côte d'Azur and was part of the ATP World Tour 250 series of the 2014 ATP World Tour. It took place at the Nice Lawn Tennis Club in Nice, France, from 18 May until 24 May 2014. Second-seeded Ernests Gulbis won the singles title.

== Points and prize money ==
=== Point distribution ===
| Event | W | F | SF | QF | Round of 16 | Round of 32 | Q | Q3 | Q2 | Q1 |
| Singles | 250 | 150 | 90 | 45 | 20 | 0 | 12 | 6 | 0 | 0 |
| Doubles | 250 | 150 | 90 | 45 | 0 | — | — | — | — | — |

=== Prize money ===
| Event | W | F | SF | QF | Round of 16 | Round of 32 | Q3 | Q2 | Q1 |
| Singles | €77,315 | €40,720 | €22,060 | €12,565 | €7,405 | €4,385 | €710 | €340 | — |
| Doubles * | €23,500 | €12,350 | €6,690 | €3,830 | €2,240 | — | — | — | — |

_{* per team}

== Singles main-draw entrants ==
=== Seeds ===
| Country | Player | Rank^{1} | Seed |
|---|---|---|---|
| USA | John Isner | 11 | 1 |
| LAT | Ernests Gulbis | 17 | 2 |
| ~~FRA~~ | ~~Gaël Monfils~~ | ~~24~~ | ~~3~~ |
| FRA | Gilles Simon | 30 | 4 |
| RUS | Dmitry Tursunov | 33 | 5 |
| FRA | Nicolas Mahut | 39 | 6 |
| ARG | Federico Delbonis | 44 | 7 |
| FRA | Édouard Roger-Vasselin | 45 | 8 |

- Rankings are as of May 12, 2014.

=== Other entrants ===
The following players received wildcards into the singles main draw:

- (Croatia) Borna Ćorić
- (France) Gaël Monfils
- (Austria) Dominic Thiem

The following players received entry from the qualifying draw:

- (Argentina) Leonardo Mayer
- (France) Lucas Pouille
- (United States) Jack Sock
- (France) Martin Vaïsse

The following player received entry as a lucky loser:

- (United States) Sam Querrey

=== Withdrawals ===
Before the tournament

- (Spain) Guillermo García López
- (Kazakhstan) Andrey Golubev
- (France) Gaël Monfils
- (France) Benoît Paire
- (Canada) Vasek Pospisil
- (Canada) Milos Raonic

== Doubles main-draw entrants ==
=== Seeds ===
| Country | Player | Country | Player | Rank^{1} | Seed |
|---|---|---|---|---|---|
| IND | Rohan Bopanna | PAK | Aisam-ul-Haq Qureshi | 37 | 1 |
| NED | Jean-Julien Rojer | ROU | Horia Tecău | 50 | 2 |
| FRA | Julien Benneteau | FRA | Édouard Roger-Vasselin | 51 | 3 |
| USA | Eric Butorac | RSA | Raven Klaasen | 61 | 4 |

- Rankings are as of May 12, 2014.

=== Other entrants ===
The following pairs received wildcards into the doubles main draw:

- (India) Somdev Devvarman / (India) Purav Raja
- (Chinese Taipei) Lee Hsin-han / (Chinese Taipei) Wang Chieh-fu

== Finals ==
=== Singles ===
- (Latvia) Ernests Gulbis defeated (Argentina) Federico Delbonis, 6–1, 7–6^{(7–5)}

=== Doubles ===
- (Slovakia) Martin Kližan / (Austria) Philipp Oswald defeated (India) Rohan Bopanna / (Pakistan) Aisam-ul-Haq Qureshi, 6–2, 6–0
