= 2015 Open de Nice Côte d'Azur – Doubles =

Doubles
- 2015 Open de Nice Côte d'Azur

Final
- Champions: (Croatia) Mate Pavić (New Zealand) Michael Venus
- Runners-up: (Netherlands) Jean-Julien Rojer (Romania) Horia Tecău
- Score: 7–6^{(7–4)}, 2–6, [10–8]

Events
Singles	Doubles
← 2014 ·	Open de Nice Côte d'Azur	· 2016 →

Martin Kližan and Philipp Oswald were the defending champions, but they chose not to participate this year.
Mate Pavić and Michael Venus won the title, defeating Jean-Julien Rojer and Horia Tecău in the final, 7–6^{(7–4)}, 2–6, [10–8].

== Seeds ==
1. (Netherlands) Jean-Julien Rojer / (Romania) Horia Tecău (final)
2. (Canada) Daniel Nestor / (Austria) Alexander Peya (quarterfinals)
3. (United States) Eric Butorac / (Australia) Sam Groth (first round)
4. (Spain) David Marrero / (Pakistan) Aisam-ul-Haq Qureshi (quarterfinals)

== Draw ==
=== Key ===
- Q = Qualifier
- WC = Wild card
- LL = Lucky loser
- Alt = Alternate
- SE = Special exempt
- PR = Protected ranking
- ITF = ITF entry
- JE = Junior exempt
- w/o = Walkover
- r = Retired
- d = Defaulted
- SR = Special ranking

=== Draw ===
First round
1	(Netherlands) J-J Rojer (Romania) H Tecău	6	6
(United States) S Johnson (United States) S Querrey	4	2
WC	(Chinese Taipei) C-p Hsieh (Chinese Taipei) C-f Wang	0	2
(Venezuela) R Maytín (Argentina) A Molteni	6	6
3	(United States) E Butorac (Australia) S Groth	3	6	[7]
(Argentina) G Durán (Argentina) M González	6	2	[10]
WC	(France) B Paire (France) L Pouille	3	2
(Australia) C Guccione (Brazil) A Sá	6	6
(Croatia) M Pavić (New Zealand) M Venus	6	7
(New Zealand) M Daniell (Kazakhstan) M Kukushkin	2	5
(Australia) B Tomic (Serbia) V Troicki
4	(Spain) D Marrero (Pakistan) A-u-H Qureshi	w/o
(Germany) M Emmrich (Sweden) A Siljeström	7^{7}	6^{7}	[10]
(France) F Martin (India) P Raja	6^{4}	7^{9}	[6]
(United Kingdom) C Fleming (United Kingdom) J Marray	5	6	[4]
2	(Canada) D Nestor (Austria) A Peya	7	1	[10]

Quarterfinals
1	(Netherlands) J-J Rojer (Romania) H Tecău	6	7^{8}
(Venezuela) R Maytín (Argentina) A Molteni	3	6^{6}
(Argentina) G Durán (Argentina) M González	5	6	[10]
(Australia) C Guccione (Brazil) A Sá	7	4	[4]
(Croatia) M Pavić (New Zealand) M Venus	6	6
4	(Spain) D Marrero (Pakistan) A-u-H Qureshi	3	3
(Germany) M Emmrich (Sweden) A Siljeström	6^{3}	6	[10]
2	(Canada) D Nestor (Austria) A Peya	7^{7}	3	[8]

Semifinals
1	(Netherlands) J-J Rojer (Romania) H Tecău	6	7
(Argentina) G Durán (Argentina) M González	3	5
(Croatia) M Pavić (New Zealand) M Venus	6	7^{9}
(Germany) M Emmrich (Sweden) A Siljeström	2	6^{7}

Final
1	(Netherlands) J-J Rojer (Romania) H Tecău	6^{4}	6	[8]
(Croatia) M Pavić (New Zealand) M Venus	7^{7}	2	[10]
