= 2016 Open de Nice Côte d'Azur =

- Date: 15–21 May
- Edition: 32nd
- Category: ATP World Tour 250
- Draw: 28S / 16D
- Prize money: €463,520
- Surface: Clay
- Location: Nice, France
- Venue: Nice Lawn Tennis Club

Champions

Singles
- (Austria) Dominic Thiem

Doubles
- (Colombia) Juan Sebastián Cabal / (Colombia) Robert Farah
← 2015 ·	Open de Nice Côte d'Azur

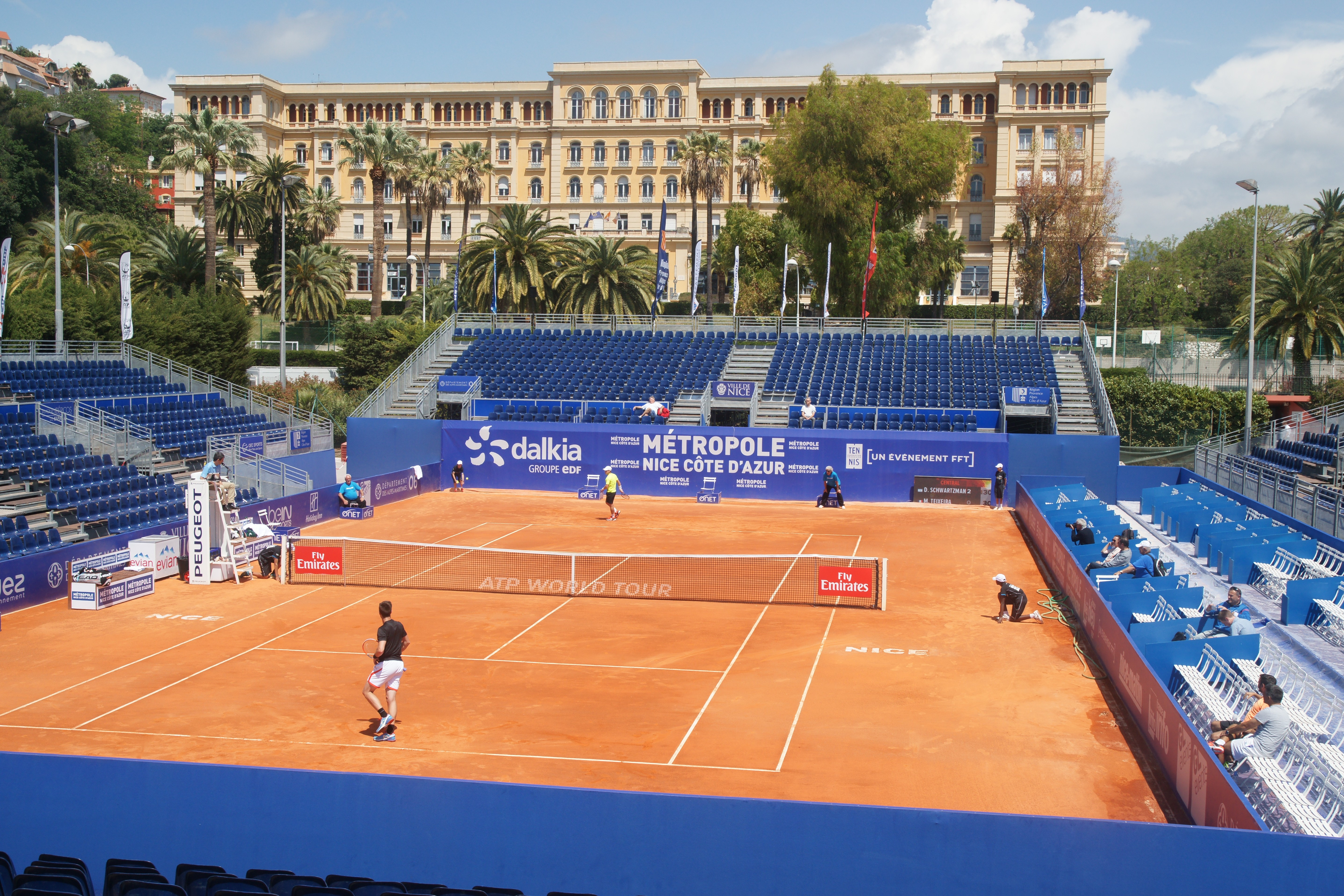
central court

The 2016 Open de Nice Côte d'Azur was a men's tennis tournament played on outdoor clay courts. It was the 32nd and final edition of the Open de Nice Côte d'Azur and part of the ATP World Tour 250 series of the 2016 ATP World Tour. It took place at the Nice Lawn Tennis Club in Nice, France, from 15 May until 21 May 2016. The tournament was replaced on the ATP World Tour by the Lyon Open. First-seeded Dominic Thiem won the singles title.

== Singles main draw entrants ==
=== Seeds ===
Country	Player	Rank^{1}	Seed
AUT	Dominic Thiem	15	1
FRA	Gilles Simon	18	2
RSA	Kevin Anderson	19	3
FRA	Benoît Paire	21	4
POR	João Sousa	30	5
ITA	Fabio Fognini	31	6
ITA	Andreas Seppi	42	7
GER	Alexander Zverev	44	8

- Rankings are as of May 9, 2016.

=== Other entrants ===
The following players received wildcards into the singles main draw:

- (South Africa) Kevin Anderson
- (Italy) Fabio Fognini
- (France) Quentin Halys

The following player received entry using a protected ranking:

- (United States) Brian Baker

The following players received entry from the qualifying draw:

- (United Kingdom) Kyle Edmund
- (Russia) Daniil Medvedev
- (Argentina) Diego Schwartzman
- (United States) Donald Young

=== Withdrawals ===
Before the tournament

- (Slovakia) Martin Kližan →replaced by (South Korea) Chung Hyeon
- (Argentina) Juan Mónaco →replaced by (France) Adrian Mannarino
- (Spain) Tommy Robredo →replaced by (Spain) Daniel Muñoz de la Nava

=== Retirements ===
- (United Kingdom) Kyle Edmund (left ankle injury)

== Doubles main draw entrants ==
=== Seeds ===
Country	Player	Country	Player	Rank^{1}	Seed
COL	Juan Sebastián Cabal	COL	Robert Farah	44	1
CRO	Mate Pavić	NZL	Michael Venus	80	2
USA	Eric Butorac	USA	Scott Lipsky	87	3
AUS	Chris Guccione	BRA	André Sá	111	4

- Rankings are as of May 9, 2016.

=== Other entrants ===
The following pairs received wildcards into the doubles main draw:

- (France) Mathias Bourgue / (France) Quentin Halys
- (Chinese Taipei) Hsieh Cheng-peng / (Chinese Taipei) Yang Tsung-hua

The following pair received entry as alternates:

- (Dominican Republic) Víctor Estrella Burgos / (Spain) Daniel Muñoz de la Nava

=== Withdrawals ===
Before the tournament

- (Argentina) Diego Schwartzman (left foot injury)

During the tournament

- (United States) Denis Kudla (lower back injury)

== Finals ==
=== Singles ===
- (Austria) Dominic Thiem defeated (Germany) Alexander Zverev, 6–4, 3–6, 6–0

=== Doubles ===
- (Colombia) Juan Sebastián Cabal / (Colombia) Robert Farah defeated (Croatia) Mate Pavić / (New Zealand) Michael Venus, 4–6, 6–4, [10–8]
