= 2013 Open de Nice Côte d'Azur – Singles =

Singles
- 2013 Open de Nice Côte d'Azur

Final
- Champion: (Spain) Albert Montañés
- Runner-up: (France) Gaël Monfils
- Score: 6–0, 7–6^{(7–3)}

Details
- Draw: 28
- Seeds: 8

Events
Singles	Doubles
- Open de Nice Côte d'Azur

Nicolás Almagro was the two-time defending champion but decided not to participate.
Albert Montañés won the title, defeating Gaël Monfils in the final, 6–0, 7–6.^{(7–3)}

== Seeds ==
The top four seeds received a bye into the second round.

1. (Czech Republic) Tomáš Berdych (withdrew because of fatigue)
2. (France) Gilles Simon (quarterfinals)
3. (United States) Sam Querrey (quarterfinals)
4. (United States) John Isner (second round)
5. (Italy) Andreas Seppi (first round)
6. (Italy) Fabio Fognini (second round)
7. (Spain) Marcel Granollers (withdrew because of a shoulder injury)
8. (Uzbekistan) Denis Istomin (first round)

== Draw ==
Key

- Q = Qualifier
- WC = Wild card
- LL = Lucky loser
- Alt = Alternate
- ITF = ITF entry
- PR = Protected ranking
- SR = Special ranking
- SE = Special exempt
- JE = Junior exempt
- JR = Junior Accelerator Programme entrant
- CO = College Accelerator Programme entrant
- NG = Next Gen Accelerator Program entrant
- w/o = Walkover
- r = Retired
- d = Defaulted

=== Finals ===
Semifinals
Alt	(Spain) Albert Montañés	6	4	6
WC	(France) Édouard Roger-Vasselin	4	6	0
WC	(France) Gaël Monfils	7	6
(Spain) Pablo Andújar	5	4

Final
Alt	(Spain) Albert Montañés	6	7^{7}
WC	(France) Gaël Monfils	0	6^{3}

=== Top half ===
First round
(Romania) V Hănescu	6	5	6
(Spain) A Ramos	3	7	4
(Argentina) C Berlocq	6	6
(Argentina) L Mayer	2	1
(France) P-H Mathieu	6	6
LL	(United States) R Harrison	4	4
Q	(Brazil) R Dutra da Silva	2	3
Q	(Ukraine) S Stakhovsky	6	6
WC	(France) É Roger-Vasselin	7	0
(Colombia) A Falla	5	0^{r}
(Lithuania) R Berankis	6	6
8	(Uzbekistan) D Istomin	2	2

Second round
Alt	(Spain) A Montañés	7	7^{7}
(Romania) V Hănescu	5	6^{2}
(Argentina) C Berlocq	5	6	3
(France) P-H Mathieu	7	3	6
3	(United States) S Querrey	7	6
Q	(Ukraine) S Stakhovsky	5	3
WC	(France) É Roger-Vasselin	2	6	6
(Lithuania) R Berankis	6	4	2

Quarterfinals
Alt	(Spain) A Montañés	6	6
(France) P-H Mathieu	4	1
3	(United States) S Querrey	6	6^{2}	1
WC	(France) É Roger-Vasselin	3	7^{7}	6

Semifinals
Alt	(Spain) A Montañés	6	4	6
WC	(France) É Roger-Vasselin	4	6	0

=== Bottom half ===
First round
6	(Italy) F Fognini	1	6	6
Q	(Italy) M Cecchinato	6	1	2
(Colombia) S Giraldo	6	3	3
WC	(France) G Monfils	4	6	6
(Australia) M Matosevic	1	4
(Netherlands) R Haase	6	6
5	(Italy) A Seppi	5	6	4
(Chinese Taipei) Y-h Lu	7	1	6
WC	(Australia) L Hewitt	3	6	3
(Spain) P Andújar	6	4	6
Q	(France) G Rufin	6	6
(Italy) P Lorenzi	3	1

Second round
6	(Italy) F Fognini	2	6^{5}
WC	(France) G Monfils	6	7^{7}
(Netherlands) R Haase	6	1	7
4	(United States) J Isner	4	6	5
(Chinese Taipei) Y-h Lu	2	0
(Spain) P Andújar	6	6
Q	(France) G Rufin	4	3
2	(France) G Simon	6	6

Quarterfinals
WC	(France) G Monfils	6	6
(Netherlands) R Haase	2	3
(Spain) P Andújar	6	7
2	(France) G Simon	4	5

Semifinals
WC	(France) G Monfils	7	6
(Spain) P Andújar	5	4

== Qualifying ==
=== Seeds ===
The top four seeds received a bye into the second round.

1. (United States) Ryan Harrison (qualifying competition, lucky loser)
2. (Brazil) Rogério Dutra da Silva (qualified)
3. (Netherlands) Thiemo de Bakker (qualifying competition)
4. (Ukraine) Sergiy Stakhovsky (qualified)
5. (France) Guillaume Rufin (qualified)
6. (France) Adrian Mannarino (first round)
7. (France) Florent Serra (second round)
8. (Estonia) Jürgen Zopp (first round)

=== Qualifiers ===
1. (France) Guillaume Rufin
2. (Brazil) Rogério Dutra da Silva
3. (Italy) Marco Cecchinato
4. (Ukraine) Sergiy Stakhovsky

=== Lucky losers ===
1. (United States) Ryan Harrison

=== Qualifying draw ===
==== First qualifier ====
First round
(France) Jonathan Eysseric	6^{1}	3
(Canada) Peter Polansky	7^{7}	6
(France) Albano Olivetti	3	5
(France) Alexandre Massa	6	7
(France) Grégoire Burquier	3	1
5	(France) Guillaume Rufin	6	6

Second round
1	(United States) Ryan Harrison	7^{7}	7
(Canada) Peter Polansky	6^{4}	5
(France) Alexandre Massa	0	1
5	(France) Guillaume Rufin	6	6

Qualifying competition
1	(United States) Ryan Harrison	3	4
5	(France) Guillaume Rufin	6	6

==== Second qualifier ====
First round
(Spain) Jordi Samper Montaña	6	3	3
(Italy) Alessandro Giannessi	3	6	6
(France) Romain Jouan	7	1	6
(France) Nicolas Mahut	5	6	3
(United States) Alex Kuznetsov	6	3	7^{7}
8	(Estonia) Jürgen Zopp	3	6	6^{1}

Second round
2	(Brazil) Rogério Dutra da Silva	7^{7}	7
(Italy) Alessandro Giannessi	6^{3}	5
(France) Romain Jouan	6	6
(United States) Alex Kuznetsov	4	3

Qualifying competition
2	(Brazil) Rogério Dutra da Silva	6	7^{8}
(France) Romain Jouan	2	6^{6}

==== Third qualifier ====
First round
(Spain) Guillermo Olaso	6	7^{7}
WC	(France) Alexandre Pierson	2	6^{3}
(Netherlands) Stephan Fransen	3	4
(Italy) Marco Cecchinato	6	6
(France) David Guez	3	1
7	(France) Florent Serra	6	6

Second round
3	(Netherlands) Thiemo de Bakker	6	6
(Spain) Guillermo Olaso	4	3
(Italy) Marco Cecchinato	6^{5}	7	6
7	(France) Florent Serra	7^{7}	5	2

Qualifying competition
3	(Netherlands) Thiemo de Bakker	3	6^{4}
(Italy) Marco Cecchinato	6	7^{7}

==== Fourth qualifier ====
First round
(Italy) Potito Starace	7^{7}	6
(Slovakia) Michal Mertiňák	6^{0}	3
(Chile) Christian Garín	6	6
(France) Cédrick Commin	3	2
(Switzerland) Henri Laaksonen	6	6
6	(France) Adrian Mannarino	3	2

Second round
4	(Ukraine) Sergiy Stakhovsky	6	6^{2}	7^{7}
(Italy) Potito Starace	3	7^{7}	6^{5}
(Chile) Christian Garín	6	1	1
(Switzerland) Henri Laaksonen	4	6	6

Qualifying competition
4	(Ukraine) Sergiy Stakhovsky	6^{6}	6	6
(Switzerland) Henri Laaksonen	7^{8}	2	4
