= 2014 Open de Nice Côte d'Azur – Doubles =

Doubles
- 2014 Open de Nice Côte d'Azur

Final
- Champions: (Slovakia) Martin Kližan (Austria) Philipp Oswald
- Runners-up: (India) Rohan Bopanna (Pakistan) Aisam-ul-Haq Qureshi
- Score: 6–2, 6–0

Events
Singles	Doubles
← 2013 ·	Open de Nice Côte d'Azur	· 2015 →

Johan Brunström and Raven Klaasen were the defending champions, but Brunström chose not to participate this year. Klaasen played alongside Eric Butorac, but lost in the first round to Andre Begemann and Robin Haase.

Martin Kližan and Philipp Oswald won the title, defeating Rohan Bopanna and Aisam-ul-Haq Qureshi in the final, 6–2, 6–0.

== Seeds ==
1. (India) Rohan Bopanna / (Pakistan) Aisam-ul-Haq Qureshi (final)
2. (Netherlands) Jean-Julien Rojer / (Romania) Horia Tecău (first round)
3. (France) Julien Benneteau / (France) Édouard Roger-Vasselin (semifinals)
4. (United States) Eric Butorac / (South Africa) Raven Klaasen (first round)

== Draw ==
=== Key ===
- Q = Qualifier
- WC = Wild card
- LL = Lucky loser
- Alt = Alternate
- SE = Special exempt
- PR = Protected ranking
- ITF = ITF entry
- JE = Junior exempt
- w/o = Walkover
- r = Retired
- d = Defaulted
- SR = Special ranking

=== Draw ===
First round
1	(India) R Bopanna (Pakistan) A-u-H Qureshi	6	6
(Australia) M Ebden (Russia) D Tursunov	4	4
(Italy) D Bracciali (Austria) O Marach	6	6^{3}	[10]
(France) G Monfils (France) B Paire	4	7^{7}	[2]
3	(France) J Benneteau (France) É Roger-Vasselin	7^{7}	6
(Australia) R Junaid (New Zealand) M Venus	6^{5}	2
(Croatia) M Pavić (Brazil) A Sá	1	6	[10]
(Germany) P Marx (Romania) F Mergea	6	3	[2]
(Slovakia) M Kližan (Austria) P Oswald	6	6
WC	(Chinese Taipei) H-h Lee (Chinese Taipei) C-f Wang	3	4
(Germany) A Begemann (Netherlands) R Haase	7^{8}	6
4	(United States) E Butorac (South Africa) R Klaasen	6^{6}	4
(Argentina) C Berlocq (Argentina) L Mayer	6	6
WC	(India) S Devvarman (India) P Raja	2	4
(United Kingdom) K Skupski (United Kingdom) N Skupski	7	5	[10]
2	(Netherlands) J-J Rojer (Romania) H Tecău	5	7	[6]

Quarterfinals
1	(India) R Bopanna (Pakistan) A-u-H Qureshi	5	7^{7}	[10]
(Italy) D Bracciali (Austria) O Marach	7	6^{5}	[5]
3	(France) J Benneteau (France) É Roger-Vasselin	6	5	[10]
(Croatia) M Pavić (Brazil) A Sá	4	7	[5]
(Slovakia) M Kližan (Austria) P Oswald	6	6
(Germany) A Begemann (Netherlands) R Haase	3	3
(Argentina) C Berlocq (Argentina) L Mayer	1	6^{2}
(United Kingdom) K Skupski (United Kingdom) N Skupski	6	7^{7}

Semifinals
1	(India) R Bopanna (Pakistan) A-u-H Qureshi	4	7^{7}	[10]
3	(France) J Benneteau (France) É Roger-Vasselin	6	6^{2}	[8]
(Slovakia) M Kližan (Austria) P Oswald	3	6	[10]
(United Kingdom) K Skupski (United Kingdom) N Skupski	6	3	[2]

Final
1	(India) R Bopanna (Pakistan) A-u-H Qureshi	2	0
(Slovakia) M Kližan (Austria) P Oswald	6	6
