= 1982 Nice International Open =

- Date: 29 March – 4 April
- Edition: 11th
- Category: Grand Prix
- Draw: 32S / 16D
- Prize money: $75,000
- Surface: Clay / outdoor
- Location: Nice, France
- Venue: Nice Lawn Tennis Club

Champions

Singles
- (Hungary) Balázs Taróczy

Doubles
- (France) Yannick Noah / (France) Henri Leconte
- Open de Nice Côte d'Azur

The 1982 Nice International Open was a men's tennis tournament played on outdoor clay courts at the Nice Lawn Tennis Club in Nice, France, and was part of the 1982 Volvo Grand Prix. It was the 11th edition of the tournament and was held from 29 March until 4 April 1982. Second-seeded Balázs Taróczy won the singles title.

== Finals ==
=== Singles ===
(Hungary) Balázs Taróczy defeated (France) Yannick Noah 6–2, 3–6, 13–11

- It was Taróczy's first singles title of the year and the fifth of his career.

=== Doubles ===
(France) Yannick Noah / (France) Henri Leconte defeated (Australia) Paul McNamee / (Hungary) Balázs Taróczy 5–7, 6–4, 6–3
