= Nice International Winter Championships =

Defunct tennis tournament
- Tour: ILTF World Circuit (1922–72); ILTF Independent Circuit (1973–74)
- Founded: 1922; 104 years ago
- Abolished: 1974; 52 years ago
- Location: Nice, France
- Venue: Nice Lawn Tennis Club
- Surface: Clay (outdoors)

The Nice International Winter Championships or Championnats Internationaux d'Hiver de Nice was a men's and women's tennis tournament founded in 1922 as the Nice Lawn Tennis Club Winter Cup also known as the Parc Imperial Winter Tournament or Nice Winter Tournament. It was organised by the Nice Lawn Tennis Club, Nice, France and played on clay courts until 1974 as part of the ILTF Independent Circuit.

== History ==
The tournament was founded in 1922 as the Nice Lawn Tennis Club Winter Cup. The tournament was usually played in February, though occasionally staged the first week of March. Following World War II the tournament was branded as the Nice International Winter Championships and informally called the Parc Imperial Winter Tournament. The tournament was part of French Riviera circuit until 1942 a sub tennis circuit of the ILTF European Circuit itself part of the ILTF World Circuit when it became part of the ILTF Independent Circuit (tournaments not part of the ILTF Grand Prix Circuit or WTA Tour) from 1973 through to 1974 when it was discontinued.

== Finals ==
=== Men's singles ===
(incomplete roll)

Nice LTC Winter Cup
| Year | Champion | Runner-up | Score |
↓ ILTF World Circuit ↓
| 1922 | (Russia) Mikhail Sumarokov-Elston | (France) Alain Gerbault | 6–1, 6–3, 6–4. |
| 1926 | (France) Jacques Brugnon | (Republic of Ireland) George Lyttleton Rogers | 6–2, 6–0, 6–2. |
| 1932 | (Switzerland) Charles Aeschlimann | (Monaco) Vladimir Landau | 1–6, 7–5, 6–3, 2–6, 6–3. |
| 1933 | (Republic of Ireland) George Lyttleton Rogers | (France) Jean Rouillot | 6–3, 6–3, 4–6, 6–3. |
Nice International Winter Championships
| 1947 | (United States) Budge Patty | (Monaco) Alexandre-Athenase Noghès | 6–2, 6–2. |
| 1950 | (France) Pierre Paccard | (United States) George Scherbatoff | 6–3, 7–5. |
| 1951 | (Monaco) Georges Pasquier | (Austria) Franz Weisz | 10–8, 0–6, 6–1. |
| 1953 | (United Kingdom) John Horn | (United Kingdom) Anthony (Tony) Starte | 6–4, 0–6, 6–4. |
| 1954 | (Australia) Pat Molloy | (United Kingdom) Philip Wooldridge | 6–2, 7–9, 6–4. |
| 1957 | (Czechoslovakia) Jan Foldina | (United Kingdom) Gordon Mudge | 6–3, 7–5. |
| 1959 | (Colombia) Hernando Salas | (Soviet Union) Yuri Shcherbakov | 6–2, 6–1. |
| 1961 | (United Kingdom) Charles Applewhaite | (United Kingdom) Trevor Adamson | 6–0, 3–6, 6–1. |
| 1962 | (Italy) Oscar Ebner | (France) Jean Paul Frances | 6–2, 3–6, 6–4. |
| 1963 | (Italy) Oscar Ebner (2) | (United States) Robert Sherman | 2–6, 6–1, 8–6. |
| 1965 | (United Kingdom) Gerald Battrick | (United Kingdom) David Lloyd | 9–7, 6–1. |
| 1966 | (United Kingdom) Geoff Bluett | (United Kingdom) John Crump | 6–3, 6–2. |
| 1967 | (West Germany) Bernd Kube | (France) Daniel Moreau | 6–3, 6–2. |
| 1968 | (Netherlands) Roy Den Hoed | (France) Jacques Jaujou | 6–4, 6–3. |
↓ Open era ↓
| 1970 | (France) Jean-François Caujolle | (France) Bernard Tapin | 6–4, 6–3. |
↓ ILTF Independent Circuit ↓
| 1974 | (France) Patrice Beust | (France) Christophe Casa | 6–2, 6–2. |

=== Women's singles ===
(incomplete roll)

Parc Imperial/Nice Winter Tournament
| Year | Champion | Runner-up | Score |
↓ ILTF World Circuit ↓
| 1922 | (United Kingdom) Molly Smailes | (United Kingdom) Jessie Tripp | 6–3, 3–6, 6–2 |
| 1923 | (France) Suzanne Lenglen | (United States) Elizabeth Ryan | default |
| 1924 | (France) Suzanne Lenglen (2) | (United Kingdom) Dorothy Shepherd Barron | 6–0, 6–1 |
| 1925 | (France) Suzanne Lenglen (3) | (United Kingdom) Margaret Tripp | 6–0, 6–1 |
| 1926 | (France) Suzanne Lenglen (4) | (France) Jeanne Franke | 6–1, 6–3 |
| 1927 | (United Kingdom) Eileen Bennett | (United Kingdom) Betty Nuthall | 6–3, 6–2 |
| 1928 | (United States) Elizabeth Ryan | (United Kingdom) Eileen Bennett | 6–4, 6–2 |
| 1932 | (France) Simonne Mathieu | (France) Colette Rosambert | 6–3, 6–3 |
| 1933 | (United Kingdom) Sheila Hewitt | (United Kingdom) Muriel Thomas | 6–4, 6–3 |
Nice International Winter Championships
| 1946 | (Luxembourg) Alice Weiwers | (Belgium) Yvonne Vincart | 6–4, 6–2 |
| 1955 | (United Kingdom) Shirley Bloomer | (United States) Pat Ward | 6–1, 6–0 |
| 1961 | (United Kingdom) Elizabeth Starkie | (France) Nicole Broccardo | 6–1, 6–1 |
| 1965 | (France) Jacqueline Rees-Lewis | (United Kingdom) Winnie Shaw | 6–0, 6–0 |
| 1966 | (France) Jacqueline Rees-Lewis (2) | (France) Denise Magnan | 6–1, 6–1 |
| 1967 | (France) Jacqueline Rees-Lewis Vives (3) | (France) C. Leca | 6–1, 6–3 |
↓ Open era ↓
| 1970 | (United States) Pam Austin | (United Kingdom) Marilyn Greenwood | 6–4, 6–3 |
| 1971 | (West Germany) Katja Ebbinghaus | (France) Odile de Roubin | 8–6, 6–4 |
