= 1972 Nice International Championships =

Men's tennis tournament

- Date: 17–23 April
- Edition: 2nd
- Category: Grand Prix (Group D)
- Draw: 48S / 8D
- Prize money: $30,000
- Surface: Clay / outdoor
- Location: Nice, France
- Venue: Nice Lawn Tennis Club

Champions

Singles
- (Romania) Ilie Năstase

Doubles
- (Czechoslovakia) Jan Kodeš / (United States) Stan Smith
- Open de Nice Côte d'Azur

The 1972 Nice International Championships, was a men's tennis tournament played on outdoor clay courts at the Nice Lawn Tennis Club in Nice, France that was part of Group D of the 1972 Grand Prix circuit. It was the second edition of the tournament and was held from 17 April until 23 April 1972. Ilie Năstase won the title.

== Finals ==
=== Singles ===
(Romania) Ilie Năstase defeated (Czechoslovakia) Jan Kodeš 6–0, 6–4, 6–3

- It was Năstase's 5th singles title of the year and the 14th of his career.

=== Doubles ===
(Czechoslovakia) Jan Kodeš / (United States) Stan Smith defeated (South Africa) Frew McMillan / (Romania) Ilie Năstase 6–3, 6–3, 7–5
