= 1979 Nice International Open =

Men's tennis tournament

- Date: 2–8 April
- Edition: 8th
- Category: Grand Prix
- Draw: 32S / 16D
- Prize money: $50,000
- Surface: Clay / outdoor
- Location: Nice, France
- Venue: Nice Lawn Tennis Club

Champions

Singles
- (Paraguay) Víctor Pecci

Doubles
- (Australia) Peter McNamara / (Australia) Paul McNamee
- Open de Nice Côte d'Azur

The 1979 Nice International Open was a men's tennis tournament played on outdoor clay courts at the Nice Lawn Tennis Club in Nice, France, and was part of the 1979 Colgate-Palmolive Grand Prix. It was the eighth edition of the tournament and was held from 2 April until 8 April 1979. Fifth-seeded Víctor Pecci won the title.

== Finals ==
=== Singles ===
(Paraguay) Víctor Pecci defeated (Australia) John Alexander 6–3, 6–2, 7–5

- It was Pecci's 1st singles title of the year and the 4th of his career.

=== Doubles ===
(Australia) Peter McNamara / (Australia) Paul McNamee defeated (Czechoslovakia) Pavel Složil / (Czechoslovakia) Tomáš Šmíd 6–1, 3–6, 6–2
