= 1977 Nice International Championships =

Men's tennis tournament

- Date: 28 March – 3 April
- Edition: 6th
- Category: Grand Prix
- Draw: 32S / 16D
- Prize money: $50,000
- Surface: Clay / outdoor
- Location: Nice, France
- Venue: Nice Lawn Tennis Club

Champions

Singles
- (Sweden) Björn Borg

Doubles
- (Romania) Ion Țiriac / (Argentina) Guillermo Vilas
- Open de Nice Côte d'Azur

The 1977 Nice International Championships, was a men's tennis tournament played on outdoor clay courts at the Nice Lawn Tennis Club in Nice, France, and was part of the 1977 Colgate-Palmolive Grand Prix. It was the sixth edition of the tournament and was held from 28 March until 3 April 1977. First-seeded Björn Borg won the title.

== Finals ==
=== Singles ===
(Sweden) Björn Borg defeated (Argentina) Guillermo Vilas 6–4, 1–6, 6–2, 6–0

- It was Borg' 2nd singles title of the year and the 21st of his career.

=== Doubles ===
(Romania) Ion Țiriac / (Argentina) Guillermo Vilas defeated (Australia) Chris Kachel / (New Zealand) Chris Lewis 6–4, 6–1
