= Juan Sebastián Cabal =

Colombian tennis player

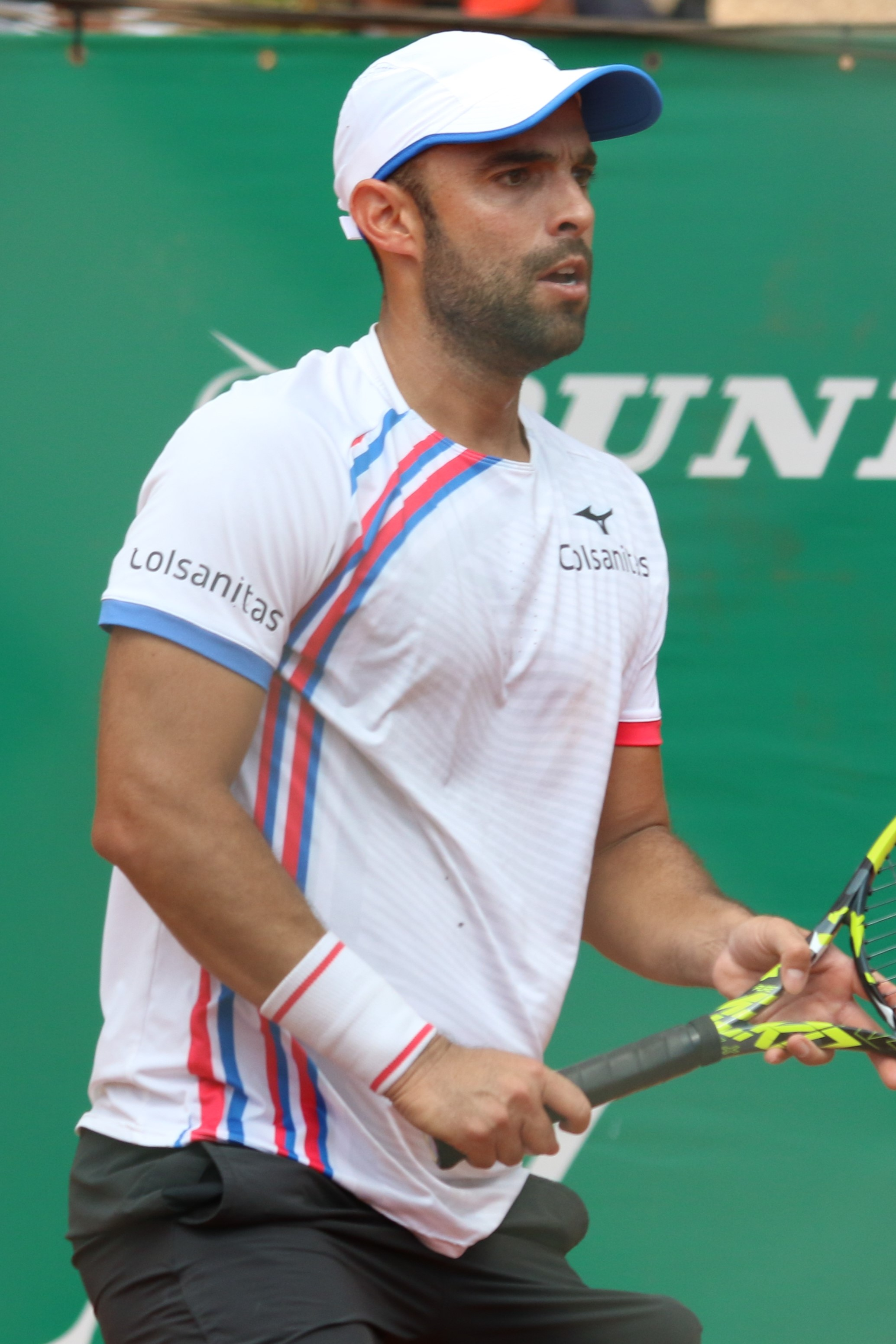
- Cabal at the 2023 Monte-Carlo Masters
- Full name: Juan Sebastián Cabal Valdés
- Country (sports): Colombia
- Residence: Panama City, Panama
- Born: 25 April 1986 (age 40) Cali, Colombia
- Height: 1.85 m (6 ft 1 in)
- Turned pro: 2005
- Retired: 2023
- Plays: Right-handed (two-handed backhand)
- Coach: Jeff Coetzee
- Prize money: US$5,264,879

Singles
- Career record: 7–4 (ATP Tour and Grand Slam level, and in Davis Cup)
- Career titles: 0
- Highest ranking: No. 184 (28 February 2011)

Grand Slam singles results
- Australian Open: Q1 (2011, 2012)
- French Open: Q2 (2011)
- Wimbledon: Q1 (2011)
- US Open: Q1 (2010, 2011)

Doubles
- Career record: 394–255 (ATP Tour and Grand Slam level, and in Davis Cup)
- Career titles: 20
- Highest ranking: No. 1 (15 July 2019)

Grand Slam doubles results
- Australian Open: F (2018)
- French Open: F (2011)
- Wimbledon: W (2019)
- US Open: W (2019)

Other doubles tournaments
- Tour Finals: SF (2018, 2019)
- Olympic Games: QF (2021)

Grand Slam mixed doubles results
- Australian Open: W (2017)
- French Open: SF (2021)
- Wimbledon: QF (2016)
- US Open: QF (2015, 2017)
Medal record
Representing Colombia
Men's tennis
Pan American Games
Gold medal – first place	2011 Guadalajara	Doubles

Juan Sebastián Cabal Valdés (Spanish pronunciation: [xwan seβasˈtjaŋ kaˈβal]; (Note: In isolation, Sebastián is pronounced [seβasˈtjan].) born 25 April 1986) is a Colombian former professional tennis player. A world No. 1 in doubles, he also reached a career-high singles ranking of No. 184 in February 2011.

Cabal is a three-time Grand Slam champion, having won both the 2019 Wimbledon Championships alongside compatriot Robert Farah (the first Hispanic duo to accomplish the feat) and the 2019 US Open, as well as the 2017 Australian Open in mixed doubles with Abigail Spears. He also finished runner-up in men's doubles at the 2011 French Open, partnering Eduardo Schwank, and the 2018 Australian Open with Farah.

Cabal won 20 doubles titles on the ATP Tour, including two at Masters 1000 level, and became world No. 1 in doubles for the first time on 15 July 2019. He spent a total of 29 weeks at the top of the doubles rankings, and he and Farah were the 2019 ATP Doubles Team of the year. Cabal represented Colombia in the Davis Cup from 2008 to his retirement, as well as at the 2012, 2016 and 2020 Olympic Games.

== Professional ==
=== 2011: ATP, Grand Slam debut & final, partnership with Farah, top 25 ===
2011 is considered as Cabal ATP and Grand Slam debut, and also considered the best year for his doubles performance at the 2011 French Open with Argentine Eduardo Schwank making history for Colombian tennis, as they defeated the top ranked pair in the semifinals, brothers Mike and Bob Bryan, and then lost the final to Daniel Nestor and Max Mirnyi.

In his second Gram Slam tournament, the 2011 Wimbledon Championships, he debuted in the first round with countryman Robert Farah. They defeated the fourth-seeded pair at the tournament, consisting of Pakistani Aisam Qureshi (world No. 8) and India's Rohan Bopanna (world No. 9), 2–6, 6–2 and 21–19. In the second round, they lost in three sets to the couple formed by American Michael Russell and Mikhail Kukushkin Kazakhstan.

He finished the year ranked No. 25 in the world, largely thanks to his French Open run.

=== 2013: First ATP final with Farah ===
In the 2013 Australian Open, he partnered again with Farah and reached the quarterfinals. In 2013, they also reached the final at the ATP 250 2013 Open de Nice Côte d'Azur. He finished the year ranked No. 43 in the world.

=== 2014: First two ATP titles, seventh final ===
In 2014, Cabal and Farah reached six ATP finals, winning titles at the ATP 500 2014 Rio Open and the ATP 250 2014 Winston-Salem Open. They also reached the final of the ATP 1000 event in Miami where they lost to Bob and Mike Bryan. He also reached a seventh final in his home country's ATP 250 event, the 2014 Claro Open Colombia in Bogotá with compatriot Nicolás Barrientos. He finished the year ranked No. 22 in the world.

=== 2015: Two more ATP 250 titles, top 20 debut ===
In 2015, Cabal and Farah added a further two titles winning the 2015 Brasil Open and the 2015 Geneva Open and reaching another three finals. In February, he reached a career-high ranking of No. 18 in the world. In major events, the pair struggled reaching the second round in Australia, Wimbledon and the US, and losing in the first round at the French Open. He finished the year ranked No. 25 in the world.

=== 2016: Four ATP titles ===
2016 was the pair's most successful year in terms of the number of titles, winning four. At the 2016 Australian Open, they had their best Grand Slam result of the year, reaching the third round. In February they won two events in South America, the 2016 Argentina Open in Buenos Aires and the 2016 Rio Open. In May they reached the final in 2016 BMW Open in Munich, and then won the ATP250 event in Nice for a second time in their career. They finished the season by winning the 2016 Kremlin Cup in Moscow. Cabal finished the season as the world No. 30.

=== 2017: Two more ATP 250 titles ===
In 2017, Cabal and Farah started the year by once again reaching the third round at the 2017 Australian Open. They returned to South America, defending their title at the 2017 Argentina Open and reaching the final again in Rio. They then won the ATP250 event in Munich. He then reached his first Grand Slam semifinal since 2011 at the 2017 French Open with Farah, where they lost to Michael Venus and Ryan Harrison.

=== 2018: Australian Open final, first Masters 1000 title, top 10 debut ===
In May 2018, at the 2018 Italian Open, Cabal and Farah won their first Masters 1000 title against Pablo Carreño Busta and João Sousa. With the win, Cabal reached the top 10 for the first time in his career.

=== 2019: Two Grand Slam and second Masters titles, world No. 1 ===
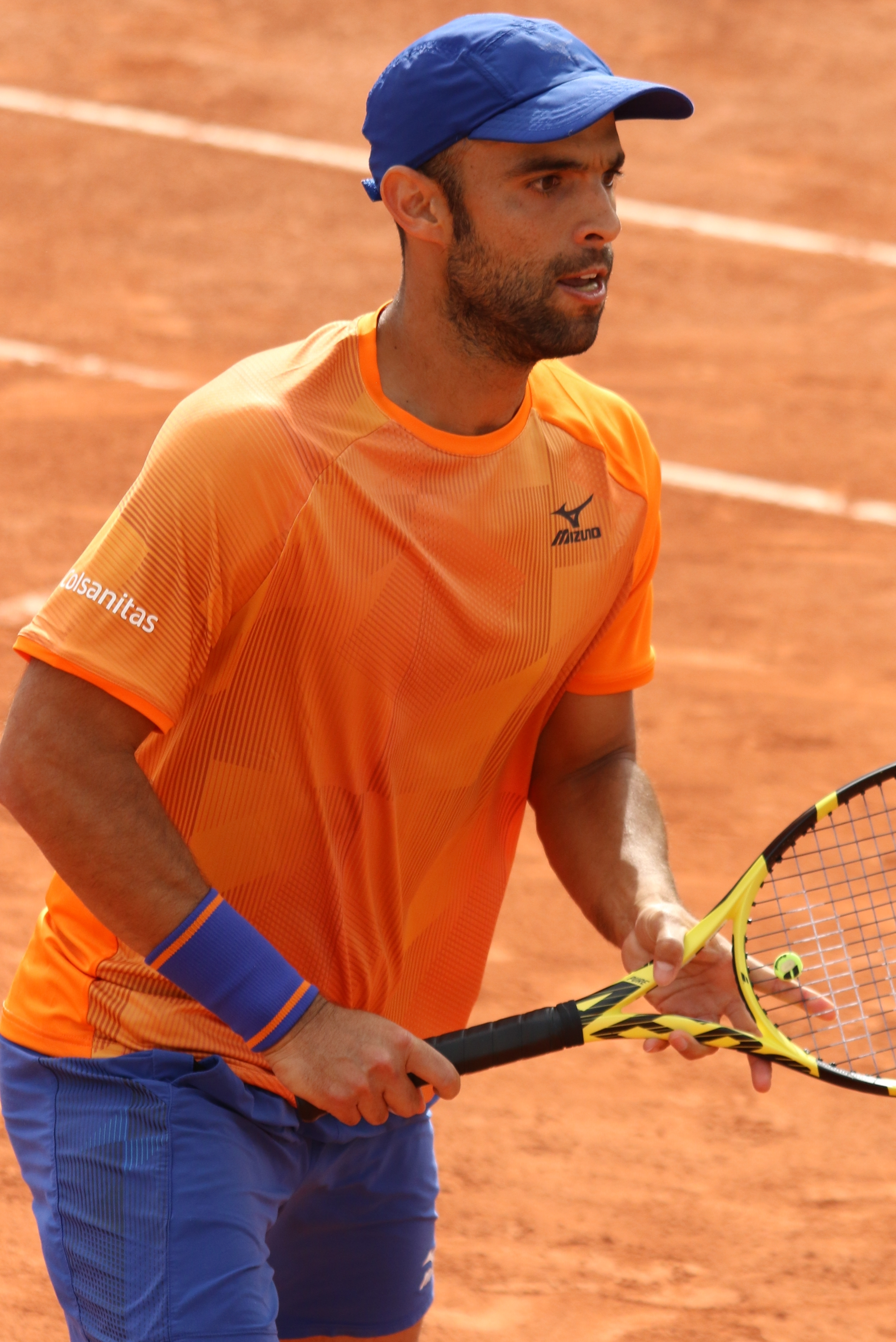
Cabal at the 2019 French Open

In 2019, the most successful year for Cabal and Farah, they won their first ever Grand Slam men's doubles title at Wimbledon in 2019, defeating Frenchmen Nicolas Mahut and Édouard Roger-Vasselin in a thrilling five-set match that required four tie-break sets; this victory helped Farah and Cabal to both ascend to world No. 1 in the week following the conclusion of the Championships.

=== 2020: French Open semifinal, year-end world No. 2 ===
Before the COVID-19 pandemic led to the suspension of the season, Cabal competed with Jaume Munar in the Australian Open, where they lost in the second round.

Playing with Farah once more, the pair reached the second round of the US Open. Then, they reached the semifinal of the delayed French Open, losing to Mate Pavić and Bruno Soares. Cabal ended the year as the world No. 2.

=== 2021: Three titles, French Open semifinal, Olympics quarterfinals, Finals qualification ===
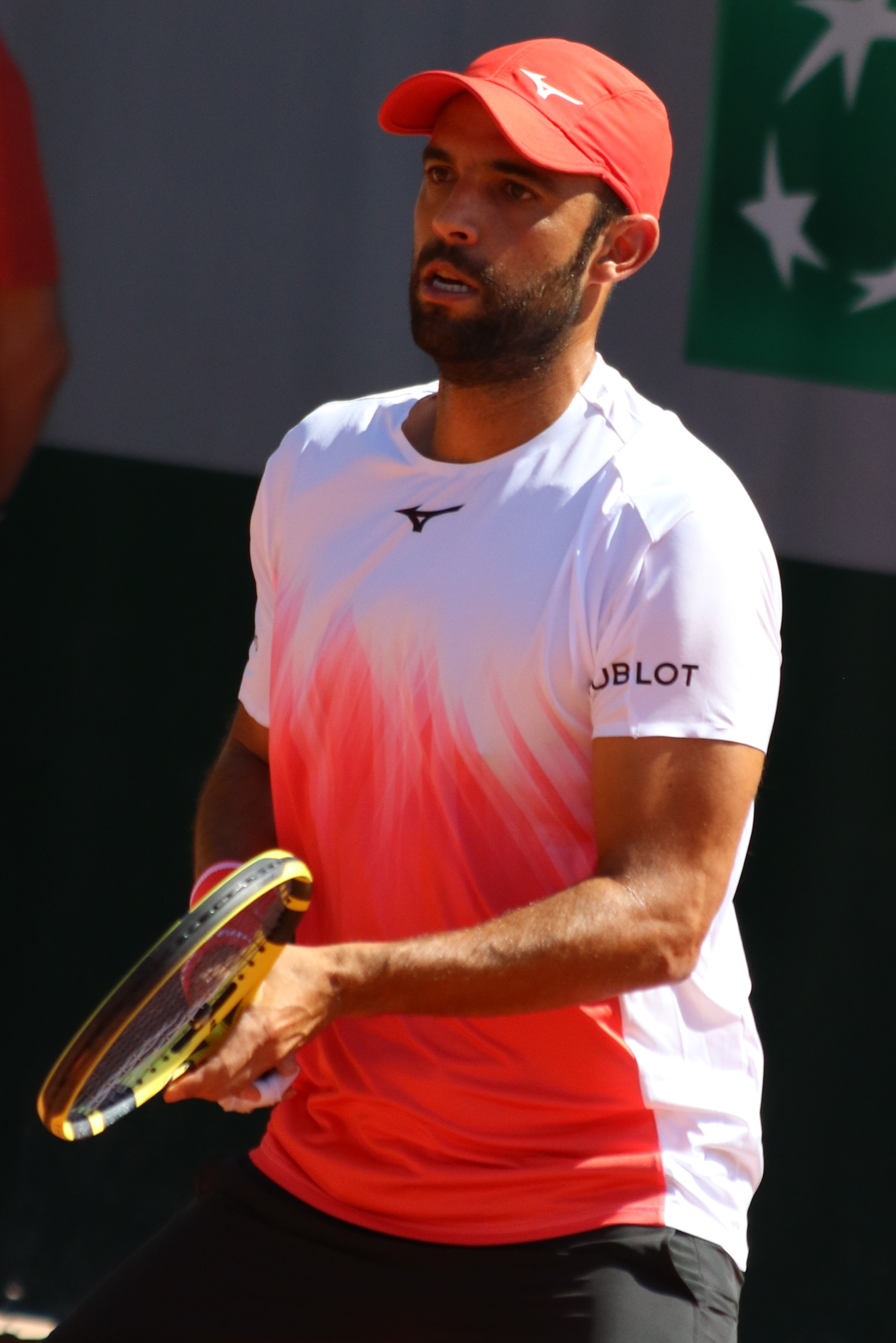
Cabal at the 2021 French Open

Cabal and Farah started their year by reaching the final at the 2021 Great Ocean Road Open where they reached the final, losing to Jamie Murray and Bruno Soares. Despite being top-seeded, they lost in the second round of the Australian Open to Alexander Bublik and Andrey Golubev.

They won their first title of the year in Dubai, defeating Nikola Mektić and Mate Pavić in the final. After losing in Miami and Monte Carlo, they claimed their second title of the year in Barcelona. This was followed by successive first round exits in two Masters 1000 events, Madrid and Rome.

At the 2021 French Open, Cabal and Farah were seeded second and reached the semifinals, losing to eventual champions Pierre-Hugues Herbert and Nicolas Mahut.

In the grass season, they suffered a second round loss at Queen's Club, before a semifinal appearance at Eastbourne, where they lost to Joe Salisbury and Rajeev Ram, who also defeated them in the quarterfinals at Wimbledon.

Cabal and Farah represented Colombia at the Tokyo Olympics where they reached the quarterfinals, before losing to the New Zealand pairing of Marcus Daniell and Michael Venus.

They suffered a disappointing American hardcourt season, losing in the first round of the US Open and Indian Wells. However, they captured their third title of the year in Vienna, avenging their earlier defeats to Salisbury and Ram by beating them in the final in straight sets. During their run, they qualified for the 2021 ATP Finals.

=== 2022-23: Two Masters finals, Retirement ===
Cabal made his last ATP Tour-level professional appearance at the 2023 US Open with Farah where they lost in the second round.

== Performance timelines ==
Key
W	F	SF	QF	#R	RR	Q#	P#	DNQ	A	Z#	PO	G	S	B	NMS	NTI	P	NH

(W) winner; (F) finalist; (SF) semifinalist; (QF) quarterfinalist; (#R) rounds 4, 3, 2, 1; (RR) round-robin stage; (Q#) qualification round; (P#) preliminary round; (DNQ) did not qualify; (A) absent; (Z#) Davis/Fed Cup Zonal Group (with number indication) or (PO) play-off; (G) gold, (S) silver or (B) bronze Olympic/Paralympic medal; (NMS) not a Masters tournament; (NTI) not a Tier I tournament; (P) postponed; (NH) not held; (SR) strike rate (events won / competed); (W–L) win–loss record.
To avoid confusion and double counting, these charts are updated at the conclusion of a tournament or when the player's participation has ended.

=== Doubles ===
Current through the 2023 US Open.

Tournament	2008	2009	2010	2011	2012	2013	2014	2015	2016	2017	2018	2019	2020	2021	2022	2023	SR	W-L
Grand Slam tournaments
Australian Open	A	A	A	A	2R	QF	1R	2R	3R	3R	F	1R	2R	2R	2R	3R	0 / 12	19–12
French Open	A	A	A	F	3R	3R	1R	1R	1R	SF	QF	SF	SF	SF	1R	2R	0 / 13	29–13
Wimbledon	A	A	A	3R	1R	3R	3R	2R	2R	2R	3R	W	NH	QF	SF	1R	1 / 12	24–11
US Open	A	A	A	2R	1R	1R	2R	2R	1R	3R	SF	W	2R	1R	SF	2R	1 / 13	21–12
Win–loss	0–0	0–0	0–0	8–3	3–4	7–4	3–4	3–4	3–4	9–4	14–4	16–2	6–3	8–4	9–4	4–4	2 / 50	93–48
Year-end championships
ATP Finals	did not qualify										SF	SF	DNQ	RR	DNQ		0 / 3	4–7
National representation
Summer Olympics	A	not held			1R	not held			2R	not held				QF	NH		0 / 3	3–3
Davis Cup	Z1	Z1	Z1	Z1	Z1	PO	PO	PO	Z1	PO	PO	RR	RR		PO	QR	0 / 2	16–11
ATP Tour Masters 1000
Indian Wells Masters	A	A	A	A	1R	2R	A	2R	1R	A	1R	QF	NH	1R	2R	1R	0 / 9	5–9
Miami Open	A	A	A	A	QF	1R	F	2R	A	1R	1R	2R	NH	2R	1R	2R	0 / 10	11–10
Monte-Carlo Masters	A	A	A	A	2R	A	2R	1R	SF	A	QF	2R	NH	SF	F	2R	0 / 9	15–9
Madrid Open	A	A	A	A	2R	A	SF	QF	1R	2R	SF	1R	NH	2R	F	1R	0 / 10	13–10
Italian Open	A	A	A	A	2R	A	1R	QF	1R	A	W	W	2R	1R	2R	1R	2 / 10	14–8
Canadian Open	A	A	A	A	A	A	1R	A	A	2R	2R	1R	NH	QF	1R	A	0 / 6	2–6
Cincinnati Masters	A	A	A	SF	2R	A	2R	2R	A	2R	F	F	1R	SF	1R	A	0 / 10	15–10
Shanghai Masters	NH	A	A	A	A	A	QF	QF	2R	2R	SF	QF	not held				0 / 6	10–6
Paris Masters	A	A	A	A	A	A	2R	2R	1R	2R	2R	2R	A	QF	A	A	0 / 7	5–7
Win–loss	0–0	0–0	0–0	3–1	6–6	1–2	12–8	10–8	4–6	5–6	13–8	16–8	1–2	6–8	10–8	2–5	2 / 77	89–75
Career statistics
Titles	0	0	0	0	0	0	2	2	4	3	1	5	0	3	0	0	20	
Finals	0	0	0	1	1	1	7	5	5	6	4	7	2	4	2	1	46	
Overall win–loss	0–0	1–1	0–1	12–5	24–22	21–21	42–26	39–25	32–21	43–20	39–23	51–20	13–9	39–20	24–21	13–20	393–255	
Year-end ranking	194	221	142	25	46	43	22	25	30	23	5	1	2	10	29	75	61%	

=== Mixed doubles ===
Tournament	2011	2012	2013	2014	2015	2016	2017	2018	2019	2020	2021	2022	2023	SR	W–L
Grand Slam tournaments
Australian Open	A	1R	1R	A	QF	1R	W	QF	QF	1R	1R	1R	2R	1 / 11	12–11
French Open	A	1R	QF	2R	1R	1R	2R	QF	1R	NH	SF	A	A	0 / 9	8–9
Wimbledon	1R	1R	1R	2R	3R	QF	3R	QF	A	NH	A	A	A	0 / 8	8–8
US Open	A	A	A	1R	QF	1R	QF	2R	A	NH	A	A	A	0 / 5	5–5
Win–loss	0–1	0–3	2–3	1–3	5–4	3–4	9–3	8–4	2–2	0–1	2–1	0–1	1–1	1 / 31	33–31

== Grand Slam tournament finals ==
=== Doubles: 4 (2 titles, 2 runner-ups) ===
Result	Date	Championship	Surface	Partner	Opponents	Score
Loss	2011	French Open	Clay	(Argentina) Eduardo Schwank	(Belarus) Max Mirnyi (Canada) Daniel Nestor	6–7^{(3–7)}, 6–3, 4–6
Loss	2018	Australian Open	Hard	(Colombia) Robert Farah	(Austria) Oliver Marach (Croatia) Mate Pavić	4–6, 4–6
Win	2019	Wimbledon	Grass	(Colombia) Robert Farah	(France) Nicolas Mahut (France) Édouard Roger-Vasselin	6–7^{(5–7)}, 7–6^{(7–5)}, 7–6^{(8–6)}, 6–7^{(5–7)}, 6–3
Win	2019	US Open	Hard	(Colombia) Robert Farah	(Spain) Marcel Granollers (Argentina) Horacio Zeballos	6–4, 7–5

=== Mixed doubles: 1 (title) ===
Result	Date	Championship	Surface	Partner	Opponents	Score
Win	2017	Australian Open	Hard	(United States) Abigail Spears	(Croatia) Ivan Dodig (India) Sania Mirza	6–2, 6–4

== Other significant finals ==
=== Masters 1000 ===
==== Doubles: 7 (2 titles, 5 runner-ups) ====
Result	Date	Tournament	Surface	Partner	Opponents	Score
Loss	2014	Miami Open	Hard	(Colombia) Robert Farah	(United States) Bob Bryan (United States) Mike Bryan	6–7^{(8–10)}, 4–6
Win	2018	Italian Open	Clay	(Colombia) Robert Farah	(Spain) Pablo Carreño Busta (Portugal) João Sousa	3–6, 6–4, [10–4]
Loss	2018	Cincinnati Masters	Hard	(Colombia) Robert Farah	(United Kingdom) Jamie Murray (Brazil) Bruno Soares	6–4, 3–6, [6–10]
Win	2019	Italian Open (2)	Clay	(Colombia) Robert Farah	(South Africa) Raven Klaasen (New Zealand) Michael Venus	6–1, 6–3
Loss	2019	Cincinnati Masters	Hard	(Colombia) Robert Farah	(Croatia) Ivan Dodig (Slovakia) Filip Polášek	6–4, 4–6, [6–10]
Loss	2022	Monte-Carlo Masters	Clay	(Colombia) Robert Farah	(United States) Rajeev Ram (United Kingdom) Joe Salisbury	4–6, 6–3, [7–10]
Loss	2022	Madrid Open	Clay	(Colombia) Robert Farah	(Netherlands) Wesley Koolhof (United Kingdom) Neal Skupski	7–6^{(7–4)}, 4–6, [5–10]

== ATP Tour finals ==
=== Doubles: 46 (20 titles, 26 runner-ups) ===
Legend Grand Slam tournaments (2–2) ATP World Tour Masters 1000 (2–5) ATP World Tour 500 Series (6–5) ATP World Tour 250 Series (10–14)	Finals by surface Hard (6–10) Clay (12–15) Grass (2–1)	Finals by setting Outdoor (17–25) Indoor (3–1)

Result	W–L	Date	Tournament	Tier	Surface	Partner	Opponents	Score
Loss	0–1	Jun 2011	French Open, France	Grand Slam	Clay	(Argentina) Eduardo Schwank	(Belarus) Max Mirnyi (Canada) Daniel Nestor	6–7^{(3–7)}, 6–3, 4–6
Loss	0–2	Jun 2012	Rosmalen Championships, Netherlands	250 Series	Grass	(Russia) Dmitry Tursunov	(Sweden) Robert Lindstedt (Romania) Horia Tecău	3–6, 6–7^{(1–7)}
Loss	0–3	May 2013	Open de Nice Côte d'Azur, France	250 Series	Clay	(Colombia) Robert Farah	(Sweden) Johan Brunström (South Africa) Raven Klaasen	3–6, 2–6
Loss	0–4	Jan 2014	Brisbane International, Australia	250 Series	Hard	(Colombia) Robert Farah	(Poland) Mariusz Fyrstenberg (Canada) Daniel Nestor	7–6^{(7–4)}, 4–6, [7–10]
Loss	0–5	Feb 2014	Chile Open, Chile	250 Series	Clay	(Colombia) Robert Farah	(Austria) Oliver Marach (Romania) Florin Mergea	3–6, 4–6
Win	1–5	Feb 2014	Rio Open, Brazil	500 Series	Clay	(Colombia) Robert Farah	(Spain) David Marrero (Brazil) Marcelo Melo	6–4, 6–2
Loss	1–6	Mar 2014	Brasil Open, Brazil	250 Series	Clay (i)	(Colombia) Robert Farah	(Spain) Guillermo García-López (Austria) Philipp Oswald	7–5, 4–6, [13–15]
Loss	1–7	Mar 2014	Miami Open, United States	Masters 1000	Hard	(Colombia) Robert Farah	(United States) Bob Bryan (United States) Mike Bryan	6–7^{(8–10)}, 4–6
Loss	1–8	Jul 2014	Colombia Open, Colombia	250 Series	Hard	(Colombia) Nicolás Barrientos	(Australia) Sam Groth (Australia) Chris Guccione	6–7^{(5–7)}, 7–6^{(7–3)}, [9–11]
Win	2–8	Aug 2014	Winston-Salem Open, United States	250 Series	Hard	(Colombia) Robert Farah	(United Kingdom) Jamie Murray (Australia) John Peers	6–3, 6–4
Win	3–8	Feb 2015	Brasil Open, Brazil	250 Series	Clay (i)	(Colombia) Robert Farah	(Italy) Paolo Lorenzi (Argentina) Diego Schwartzman	6–4, 6–2
Win	4–8	May 2015	Geneva Open, Switzerland	250 Series	Clay	(Colombia) Robert Farah	(South Africa) Raven Klaasen (Chinese Taipei) Lu Yen-hsun	7–5, 4–6, [10–7]
Loss	4–9	Jul 2015	Swedish Open, Sweden	250 Series	Clay	(Colombia) Robert Farah	(France) Jérémy Chardy (Poland) Łukasz Kubot	7–6^{(8–6)}, 3–6, [8–10]
Loss	4–10	Aug 2015	German Open, Germany	500 Series	Clay	(Colombia) Robert Farah	(United Kingdom) Jamie Murray (Australia) John Peers	6–2, 3–6, [8–10]
Loss	4–11	Oct 2015	Japan Open, Japan	500 Series	Hard	(Colombia) Robert Farah	(South Africa) Raven Klaasen (Brazil) Marcelo Melo	6–7^{(5–7)}, 6–3, [7–10]
Win	5–11	Feb 2016	Argentina Open, Argentina	250 Series	Clay	(Colombia) Robert Farah	(Spain) Íñigo Cervantes (Italy) Paolo Lorenzi	6–3, 6–0
Win	6–11	Feb 2016	Rio Open, Brazil (2)	500 Series	Clay	(Colombia) Robert Farah	(Spain) Pablo Carreño Busta (Spain) David Marrero	7–6^{(7–5)}, 6–1
Loss	6–12	May 2016	Bavarian International, Germany	250 Series	Clay	(Colombia) Robert Farah	(Finland) Henri Kontinen (Australia) John Peers	3–6, 6–3, [7–10]
Win	7–12	May 2016	Open de Nice Côte d'Azur, France	250 Series	Clay	(Colombia) Robert Farah	(Croatia) Mate Pavić (New Zealand) Michael Venus	4–6, 6–4, [10–8]
Win	8–12	Oct 2016	Kremlin Cup, Russia	250 Series	Hard (i)	(Colombia) Robert Farah	(Austria) Julian Knowle (Austria) Jürgen Melzer	7–5, 4–6, [10–5]
Win	9–12	Feb 2017	Argentina Open, Argentina (2)	250 Series	Clay	(Colombia) Robert Farah	(Mexico) Santiago González (Spain) David Marrero	6–1, 6–4
Loss	9–13	Feb 2017	Rio Open, Brazil	500 Series	Clay	(Colombia) Robert Farah	(Spain) Pablo Carreño Busta (Uruguay) Pablo Cuevas	4–6, 7–5, [8–10]
Loss	9–14	Apr 2017	Hungarian Open, Hungary	250 Series	Clay	(Colombia) Robert Farah	(United States) Brian Baker (Croatia) Nikola Mektić	6–7^{(2–7)}, 4–6
Win	10–14	May 2017	Bavarian International, Germany	250 Series	Clay	(Colombia) Robert Farah	(France) Jérémy Chardy (France) Fabrice Martin	6–3, 6–3
Loss	10–15	May 2017	Geneva Open, Switzerland	250 Series	Clay	(Colombia) Robert Farah	(Netherlands) Jean-Julien Rojer (Romania) Horia Tecău	6–2, 6–7^{(9–11)}, [6–10]
Win	11–15	Aug 2017	Los Cabos Open, Mexico	250 Series	Hard	(Philippines) Treat Huey	(Peru) Sergio Galdós (Venezuela) Roberto Maytín	6–2, 6–3
Loss	11–16	Jan 2018	Australian Open, Australia	Grand Slam	Hard	(Colombia) Robert Farah	(Austria) Oliver Marach (Croatia) Mate Pavić	4–6, 4–6
Loss	11–17	Feb 2018	Argentina Open, Argentina	250 Series	Clay	(Colombia) Robert Farah	(Argentina) Andrés Molteni (Argentina) Horacio Zeballos	3–6, 7–5, [3–10]
Win	12–17	May 2018	Italian Open, Italy	Masters 1000	Clay	(Colombia) Robert Farah	(Spain) Pablo Carreño Busta (Portugal) João Sousa	3–6, 6–4, [10–4]
Loss	12–18	Aug 2018	Cincinnati Masters, United States	Masters 1000	Hard	(Colombia) Robert Farah	(United Kingdom) Jamie Murray (Brazil) Bruno Soares	6–4, 3–6, [6–10]
Loss	12–19	Jan 2019	Sydney International, Australia	250 Series	Hard	(Colombia) Robert Farah	(United Kingdom) Jamie Murray (Brazil) Bruno Soares	4–6, 3–6
Win	13–19	Apr 2019	Barcelona Open, Spain	500 Series	Clay	(Colombia) Robert Farah	(United Kingdom) Jamie Murray (Brazil) Bruno Soares	6–4, 7–6^{(7–4)}
Win	14–19	May 2019	Italian Open, Italy (2)	Masters 1000	Clay	(Colombia) Robert Farah	(South Africa) Raven Klaasen (New Zealand) Michael Venus	6–1, 6–3
Win	15–19	Jun 2019	Eastbourne International, United Kingdom	250 Series	Grass	(Colombia) Robert Farah	(Argentina) Maximo González (Argentina) Horacio Zeballos	3–6, 7–6^{(7–4)}, [10–6]
Win	16–19	Jul 2019	Wimbledon Championships, United Kingdom	Grand Slam	Grass	(Colombia) Robert Farah	(France) Nicolas Mahut (France) Édouard Roger-Vasselin	6–7^{(5–7)}, 7–6^{(7–5)}, 7–6^{(8–6)}, 6–7^{(5–7)}, 6–3
Loss	16–20	Aug 2019	Cincinnati Masters, United States	Masters 1000	Hard	(Colombia) Robert Farah	(Croatia) Ivan Dodig (Slovakia) Filip Polášek	6–4, 4–6, [6–10]
Win	17–20	Sep 2019	US Open, United States	Grand Slam	Hard	(Colombia) Robert Farah	(Spain) Marcel Granollers (Argentina) Horacio Zeballos	6–4, 7–5
Loss	17–21	Feb 2020	Mexican Open, Mexico	500 Series	Hard	(Colombia) Robert Farah	(Poland) Łukasz Kubot (Brazil) Marcelo Melo	6–7^{(6–8)}, 7–6^{(7–4)}, [9–11]
Loss	17–22	Oct 2020	Sardegna Open, Italy	250 Series	Clay	(Colombia) Robert Farah	(New Zealand) Marcus Daniell (Austria) Philipp Oswald	3–6, 4–6
Loss	17–23	Feb 2021	Great Ocean Road Open, Australia	250 Series	Hard	(Colombia) Robert Farah	(United Kingdom) Jamie Murray (Brazil) Bruno Soares	3–6, 6–7^{(7–9)}
Win	18–23	Mar 2021	Dubai Tennis Championships, United Arab Emirates	500 Series	Hard	(Colombia) Robert Farah	(Croatia) Nikola Mektić (Croatia) Mate Pavić	7–6^{(7–0)}, 7–6^{(7–4)}
Win	19–23	Apr 2021	Barcelona Open, Spain	500 Series	Clay	(Colombia) Robert Farah	(Germany) Kevin Krawietz (Romania) Horia Tecău	6–4, 6–2
Win	20–23	Oct 2021	Vienna Open, Austria	500 Series	Hard (i)	(Colombia) Robert Farah	(United States) Rajeev Ram (United Kingdom) Joe Salisbury	6–4, 6–2
Loss	20–24	Apr 2022	Monte-Carlo Masters, Monaco	Masters 1000	Clay	(Colombia) Robert Farah	(United States) Rajeev Ram (United Kingdom) Joe Salisbury	4–6, 6–3, [7–10]
Loss	20–25	May 2022	Madrid Open, Spain	Masters 1000	Clay	(Colombia) Robert Farah	(Netherlands) Wesley Koolhof (United Kingdom) Neal Skupski	7–6^{(7–4)}, 4–6, [5–10]
Loss	20–26	Feb 2023	Rio Open, Brazil	500 Series	Clay	(Brazil) Marcelo Melo	(Argentina) Máximo González (Argentina) Andrés Molteni	1–6, 6–7^{(3–7)}
