= Open de Nice Côte d'Azur =

French tennis tournament

Coordinates: 43.704°N 7.252°E

Defunct tennis tournament
- Event name: Nice French Riviera Open
- Tour: Grand Prix; ATP World Series; ATP World Tour 250 series
- Founded: 1925; 101 years ago
- Abolished: 2016; 10 years ago
- Location: Nice, France
- Venue: Nice Lawn Tennis Club
- Surface: Clay / outdoor

The Nice French Riviera Open (or Open de Nice Côte d'Azur in French) was an ATP World Tour 250 series and, formerly, Grand Prix tennis circuit affiliated men's tennis tournament. This tournament was originally founded in 1925 as a combined event called the City of Nice Championships and remained as a combined event until 1971 and 1976 to 1978. Also known as the Nice International Championships. It was held in Nice, France at the Nice Lawn Tennis Club and played on outdoor clay courts. The last singles champion is Dominic Thiem from Austria.

== History ==
The Nice Lawn Tennis Club was founded in 1890 in Nice, France and as hosted many international tournaments. In 1925 it established the City of Nice Championships or Championnats de la Ville de Nice. Following World War II it was rebranded as the Nice International City Championships or Championnats Internationaux de la Ville de Nice. By the early 1960s it was branded as the Nice International Championships. After the Second World War, the three tournaments played at the Nice Lawn Tennis Club including the (South of France Championships (f.1897), Nice LTC Championships (1895-1955) and the City of Nice Championships (f.1925) were gradually grouped into one event. The Nice LTC event was only staged four times between 1949 and 1955 and was replaced by the Championnats de la Ville de Nice.

The tournament remained a combined event until 1971. It was combined again from 1977 to 1978. Initially tournament was usually played in February, then moved to March, then was moved again to April in the tour calendar. The women's event first ended in 1978. In 1988 it was revived but was moved to July at the same venue and was branded as the Nice Ladies Open. In 2001 a new Nice Women’s International Tennis Championships or Internationaux de Tennis Feminin Nice and played in February was revived for one edition only.

The men's event part of the Grand Prix tennis circuit between 1970 and 1989. The event was played under various (sponsored) names from 1971 through 1995. In 2010 Nice became the location of a World Tour 250 series clay court tournament, replacing the Interwetten Austrian Open in Kitzbühel, Austria on the ATP calendar. It was scheduled a week before the French Open. In November 2016 it was announced that the tournament would be replaced on the 2017 calendar by a new event, the Lyon Open, because the venue in Nice at the Nice Lawn Tennis Club could not be expanded.

Ilie Năstase, Björn Borg, Henri Leconte, Nicolás Almagro, and Dominic Thiem have each won the singles title twice.

== Past finals ==
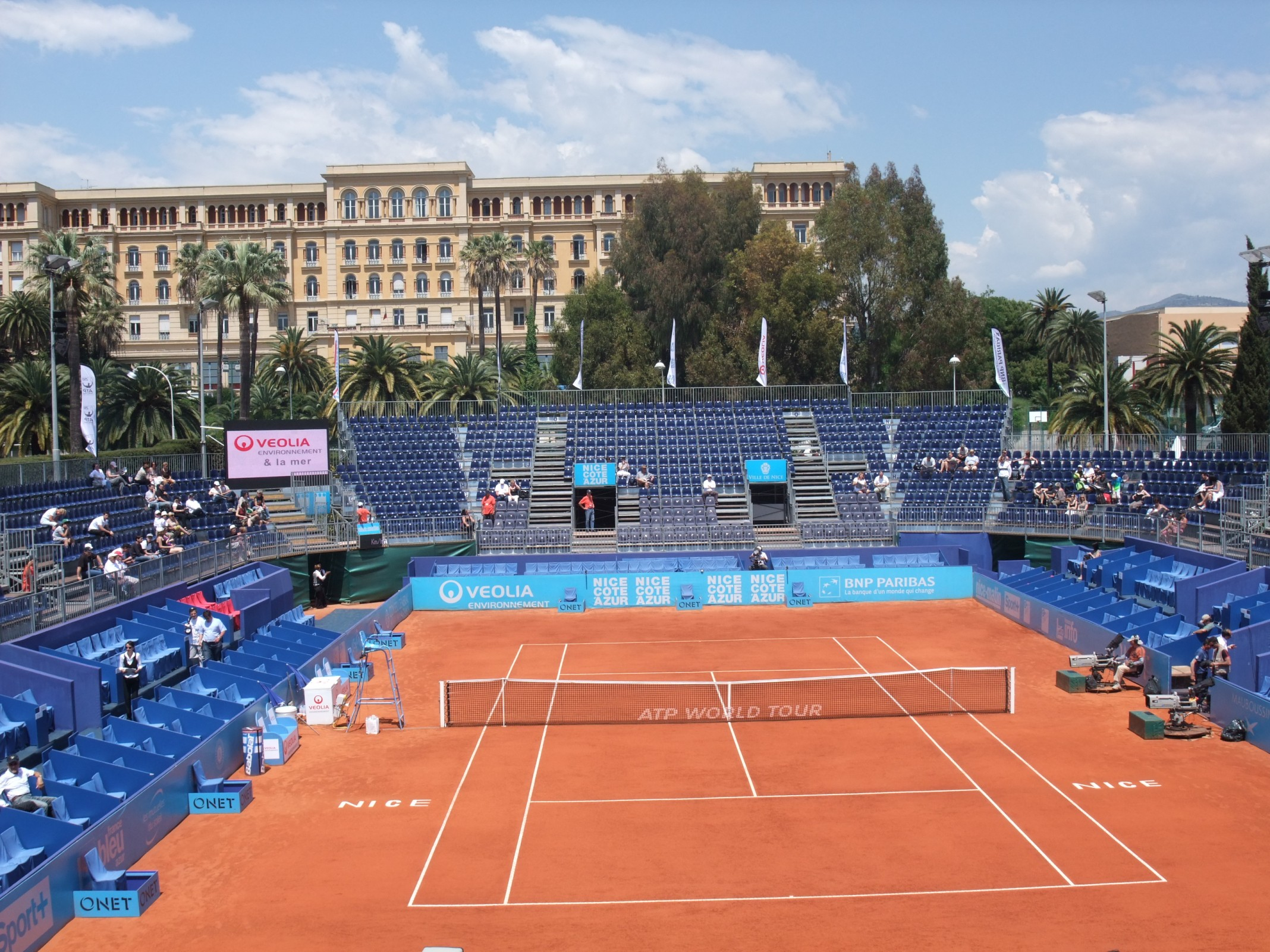
Central Court Nice Lawn Tennis Club

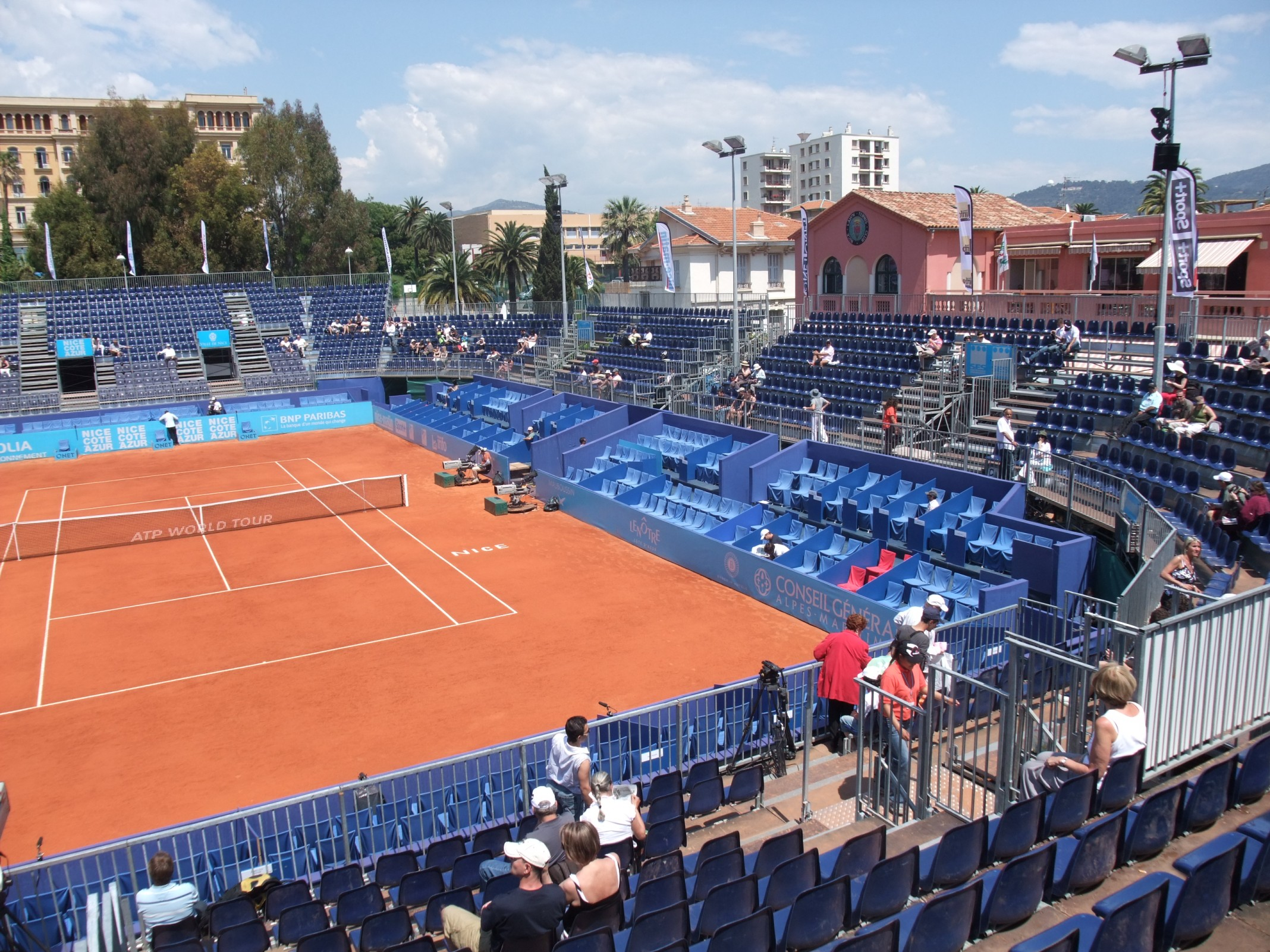
Central Court

=== Singles ===
Year	Champions	Runners-up	Score	Name
1971	(Romania) Ilie Năstase	(Czechoslovakia) Jan Kodeš	10–8, 11–9, 6–1	Nice International Championships
1972	(Romania) Ilie Năstase	(Czechoslovakia) Jan Kodeš	6–0, 6–4, 6–3	Nice International Championships
1973	(Spain) Manuel Orantes	(Italy) Adriano Panatta	7–6, 5–7, 4–6, 7–6, 12–10	Craven International Championships
1974	Not held			
1975	(Australia) Dick Crealy	(Colombia) Iván Molina	7–6, 6–4, 6–3	Nice International Championships
1976	(Italy) Corrado Barazzutti	(Czechoslovakia) Jan Kodeš	6–2, 2–6, 5–7, 7–6, 8–6	Nice International Championships
1977	(Sweden) Björn Borg	(Argentina) Guillermo Vilas	6–4, 1–6, 6–2, 6–0	Nice International Championships
1978	(Spain) José Higueras	(France) Yannick Noah	6–3, 6–4, 6–4	Montano-Snauwaert International Championships
1979	(Paraguay) Víctor Pecci	(Australia) John Alexander	6–3, 6–2, 7–5	Nice International Open
1980	(Sweden) Björn Borg	(Spain) Manuel Orantes	6–2, 6–0, 6–1	Nice International Open
1981	(France) Yannick Noah	(Bolivia) Mario Martínez	6–4, 6–2	Donnay International Open
1982	(Hungary) Balázs Taróczy	(France) Yannick Noah	6–2, 3–6, 13–11	Nice International Open
1983	(Sweden) Henrik Sundström	(Spain) Manuel Orantes	7–5, 4–6, 6–3	Donnay International Open
1984	(Ecuador) Andrés Gómez	(Sweden) Henrik Sundström	6–1, 6–4	Nice International Open
1985	(France) Henri Leconte	(Paraguay) Víctor Pecci	6–4, 6–4	Nice International Open
1986	(Spain) Emilio Sánchez	(Australia) Paul McNamee	6–1, 6–3	Nice International Open
1987	(Sweden) Kent Carlsson	(Spain) Emilio Sánchez	7–6, 6–3	Nice International Open
1988	(France) Henri Leconte	(France) Jérôme Potier	6–2, 6–2	Swatch Open
1989	(Soviet Union) Andrei Chesnokov	(France) Jérôme Potier	6–4, 6–4	Swatch Open
1990	(Spain) Juan Aguilera	(France) Guy Forget	2–6, 6–3, 6–4	Philips Open
1991	(Argentina) Martín Jaite	(Socialist Federal Republic of Yugoslavia) Goran Prpić	3–6, 7–6, 6–3	Philips Open
1992	(Argentina) Gabriel Markus	(Spain) Javier Sánchez	6–4, 6–4	Philips Open
1993	(Germany) Marc-Kevin Goellner	(United States) Ivan Lendl	1–6, 6–4, 6–2	Philips Open
1994	(Spain) Alberto Berasategui	(United States) Jim Courier	6–4, 6–2	Philips Open
1995	(Switzerland) Marc Rosset	(Russia) Yevgeny Kafelnikov	6–4, 6–0	Philips Open
1996–2009	Not held			
2010	(France) Richard Gasquet	(Spain) Fernando Verdasco	6–3, 5–7, 7–6^{(7–5)}	Open de Nice Côte d'Azur/Nice French Riviera Open
2011	(Spain) Nicolás Almagro	(Romania) Victor Hănescu	6–7^{(5–7)}, 6–3, 6–3	Open de Nice Côte d'Azur/Nice French Riviera Open
2012	(Spain) Nicolás Almagro	(United States) Brian Baker	6–3, 6–2	Open de Nice Côte d'Azur/Nice French Riviera Open
2013	(Spain) Albert Montañés	(France) Gaël Monfils	6–0, 7–6^{(7–3)}	Open de Nice Côte d'Azur/Nice French Riviera Open
2014	(Latvia) Ernests Gulbis	(Argentina) Federico Delbonis	6–1, 7–6^{(7–5)}	Open de Nice Côte d'Azur/Nice French Riviera Open
2015	(Austria) Dominic Thiem	(Argentina) Leonardo Mayer	6–7^{(8–10)}, 7–5, 7–6^{(7–2)}	Open de Nice Côte d'Azur/Nice French Riviera Open
2016	(Austria) Dominic Thiem	(Germany) Alexander Zverev	6–4, 3–6, 6–0	Open de Nice Côte d'Azur/Nice French Riviera Open
2017	replaced by Lyon Open			

=== Doubles ===
Year	Champions	Runners-up	Score
1971	(Romania) Ion Țiriac (Romania) Ilie Năstase	(France) Pierre Barthès (France) François Jauffret	6–3, 6–3
1972	(Czechoslovakia) Jan Kodeš (United States) Stan Smith	(South Africa) Frew McMillan (Romania) Ilie Năstase	6–3, 6–3, 7–5
1973	(Spain) Manuel Orantes (Spain) Juan Gisbert Sr.	(France) Patrice Beust (France) Daniel Contet	7–5, 6–1
1974	Not held		
1975	(Mexico) Marcello Lara (Mexico) Joaquín Loyo Mayo	(Colombia) Iván Molina (Colombia) Jairo Velasco Sr.	7–6, 6–7, 8–6
1976	(France) Patrice Dominguez (France) François Jauffret	(Poland) Wojciech Fibak (West Germany) Karl Meiler	6–4, 3–6, 6–3
1977	(Romania) Ion Țiriac (Argentina) Guillermo Vilas	(Australia) Chris Kachel (New Zealand) Chris Lewis	6–4, 6–1
1978	(France) Patrice Dominguez (France) François Jauffret	(Czechoslovakia) Jan Kodeš (Czechoslovakia) Tomáš Šmíd	6–4, 6–0
1979	(Australia) Peter McNamara (Australia) Paul McNamee	(Czechoslovakia) Pavel Složil (Czechoslovakia) Tomáš Šmíd	6–1, 3–6, 6–2
1980	(Australia) Kim Warwick (United States) Chris Delaney	(Czechoslovakia) Stanislav Birner (Czechoslovakia) Jiří Hřebec	6–4, 6–0
1981	(France) Yannick Noah (France) Pascal Portes	(Australia) Chris Lewis (Czechoslovakia) Pavel Složil	4–6, 6–3, 6–4
1982	(France) Yannick Noah (France) Henri Leconte	(Australia) Paul McNamee (Hungary) Balázs Taróczy	5–7, 6–4, 6–3
1983	(Czechoslovakia) Libor Pimek (Belgium) Bernard Boileau	(France) Bernard Fritz (France) Jean-Louis Haillet	6–3, 6–4
1984	(Sweden) Jan Gunnarsson (Denmark) Michael Mortensen	(Chile) Hans Gildemeister (Ecuador) Andrés Gómez	6–1, 7–5
1985	(Italy) Claudio Panatta (Czechoslovakia) Pavel Složil	(France) Loïc Courteau (France) Guy Forget	3–6, 6–3, 8–6
1986	(Switzerland) Jakob Hlasek (Czechoslovakia) Pavel Složil	(United States) Gary Donnelly (United Kingdom) Colin Dowdeswell	6–3, 3–6, 11–9
1987	(Spain) Sergio Casal (Spain) Emilio Sánchez	(Switzerland) Claudio Mezzadri (Italy) Gianni Ocleppo	6–3, 6–3
1988	(France) Guy Forget (France) Henri Leconte	(Switzerland) Heinz Günthardt (Italy) Diego Nargiso	4–6, 6–3, 6–4
1989	(West Germany) Ricki Osterthun (West Germany) Udo Riglewski	(Switzerland) Heinz Günthardt (Hungary) Balázs Taróczy	7–6, 6–7, 6–1
1990	(Argentina) Alberto Mancini (France) Yannick Noah	(Uruguay) Marcelo Filippini (Austria) Horst Skoff	walkover
1991	(Sweden) Rikard Bergh (Sweden) Jan Gunnarsson	(Czechoslovakia) Vojtěch Flégl (Sweden) Nicklas Utgren	6–4, 4–6, 6–3
1992	(United States) Patrick Galbraith (United States) Scott Melville	(South Africa) Pieter Aldrich (South Africa) Danie Visser	6–1, 3–6, 6–4
1993	(Australia) David Macpherson (Australia) Laurie Warder	(United States) Shelby Cannon (United States) Scott Melville	3–4 ret
1994	(Spain) Javier Sánchez (Australia) Mark Woodforde	(Netherlands) Hendrik Jan Davids (South Africa) Piet Norval	7–5, 6–3
1995	(Czechoslovakia) Cyril Suk (Czechoslovakia) Daniel Vacek	(United States) Luke Jensen (United States) David Wheaton	3–6, 7–6, 7–6
1996–2009	Not held		
2010	(Brazil) Marcelo Melo (Brazil) Bruno Soares	(India) Rohan Bopanna (Pakistan) Aisam-ul-Haq Qureshi	1–6, 6–3, [10–5]
2011	(United States) Eric Butorac (Curaçao) Jean-Julien Rojer	(Mexico) Santiago González (Spain) David Marrero	6–3, 6–4
2012	(United States) Bob Bryan (United States) Mike Bryan	(Austria) Oliver Marach (Slovakia) Filip Polášek	7–6^{(7–5)}, 6–3
2013	(Sweden) Johan Brunström (South Africa) Raven Klaasen	(Colombia) Juan Sebastián Cabal (Colombia) Robert Farah	6–3, 6–2
2014	(Slovakia) Martin Kližan (Austria) Philipp Oswald	(India) Rohan Bopanna (Pakistan) Aisam-ul-Haq Qureshi	6–2, 6–0
2015	(Croatia) Mate Pavić (New Zealand) Michael Venus	(Netherlands) Jean-Julien Rojer (Romania) Horia Tecău	7–6^{(7–4)}, 2–6, [10–8]
2016	(Colombia) Juan Sebastián Cabal (Colombia) Robert Farah	(Croatia) Mate Pavić (New Zealand) Michael Venus	4–6, 6–4, [10–8]

== See also ==
- List of tennis tournaments
- Nice Lawn Tennis Club
- Interwetten Austrian Open Kitzbühel
