= Nice Lawn Tennis Club =

Tennis club in Nice, France

Coordinates: 43°42′16″N 7°15′07″E

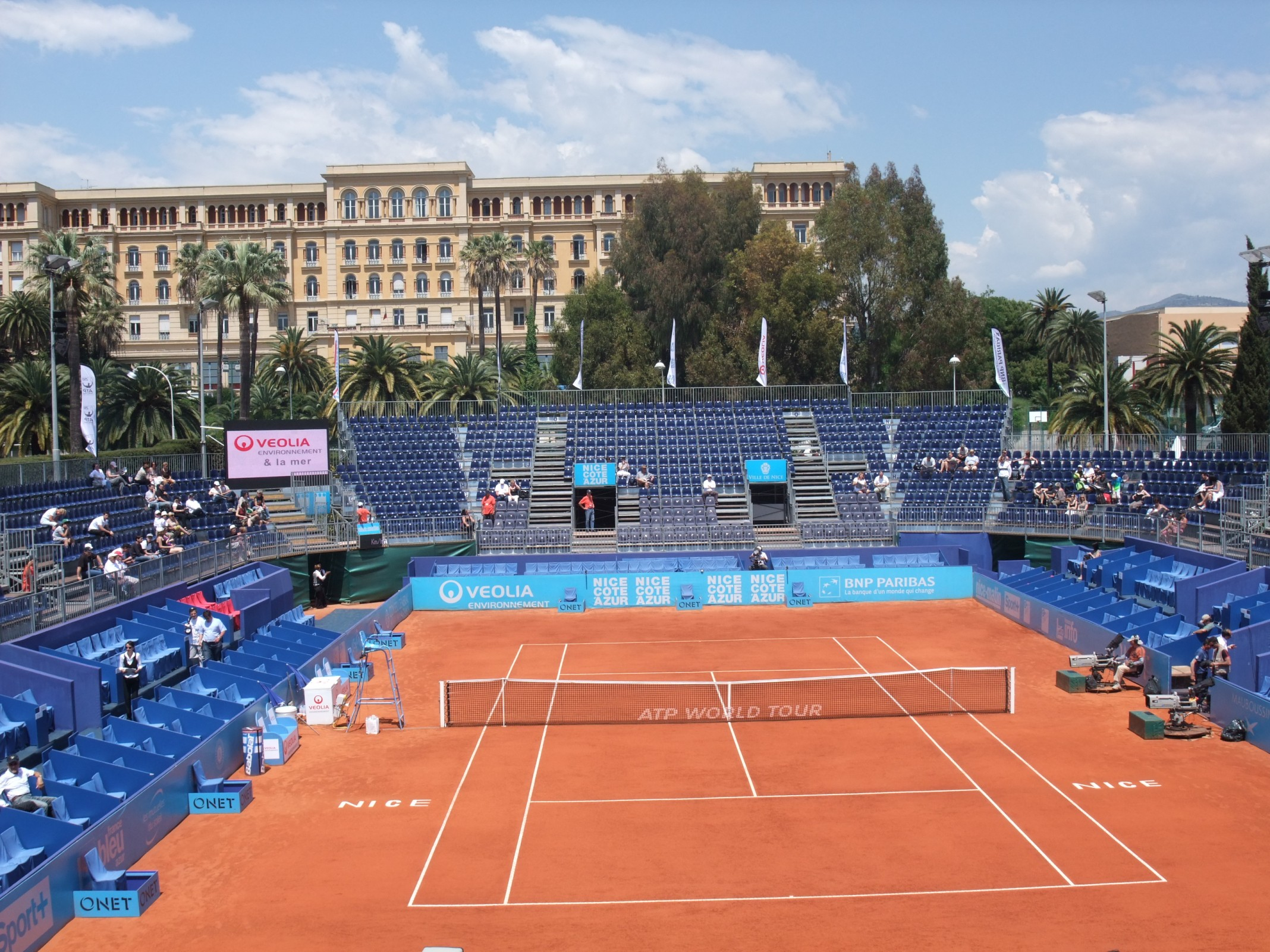
- Interactive map of Nice Lawn Tennis Club
- Address: 5 Avenue Suzanne Lenglen
- Location: Nice, France
- Surface: Clay

Construction
- Opened: 1919

The Nice Lawn Tennis Club is a tennis club located on the Parc Imperial complex in Nice, France. It is the home venue of the ATP World Tour's Nice Open as of 2010, and the Hopman Cup as of 2023.

== History ==
The complex opened in 1902. It is located at 5 Avenue Suzanne Lenglen. It is home to 18 clay courts, including a center court stadium.

From 1902 to 1920, the complex was run by the Hotel Imperial, the current club took over the complex in 1920 and until 1970 the club hosted the South of France Championships for men and ended in 1971 for women.

The grass courts were turned into clay courts during that time.

In 1997, the tennis club hosted a Fed Cup semifinals tie between France and Belgium.

== Notable tournaments ==
1. Nice International Winter Championships
2. Nice Lawn Tennis Club Championships
3. Open de Nice Côte d'Azur
4. South of France Championships
