= 1988 Swatch Open – Doubles =

Doubles
- 1988 Swatch Open

Final
- Champions: (France) Guy Forget (France) Henri Leconte
- Runners-up: (Switzerland) Heinz Günthardt (Italy) Diego Nargiso
- Score: 4–6, 6–3, 6–4

Events
Singles	Doubles
← 1987 ·	Open de Nice Côte d'Azur	· 1989 →

Sergio Casal and Emilio Sánchez were the defending champions, but none competed this year.

Guy Forget and Henri Leconte won the title by defeating Heinz Günthardt and Diego Nargiso 4–6, 6–3, 6–4 in the final.

== Seeds ==
1. (United States) Rick Leach / (United States) Jim Pugh (semifinals)
2. (Sweden) Joakim Nyström / (Sweden) Magnus Tideman (first round)
3. (Iran) Mansour Bahrami / (Czechoslovakia) Jaroslav Navrátil (first round)
4. (France) Guy Forget / (France) Henri Leconte (champion)

== Draw ==
=== Key ===
- Q = Qualifier
- WC = Wild card
- LL = Lucky loser
- Alt = Alternate
- ITF = ITF entry
- PR = Protected ranking
- SR = Special ranking
- SE = Special exempt
- JE = Junior exempt
- JR = Junior Accelerator Programme entrant
- CO = College Accelerator Programme entrant
- NG = Next Gen Accelerator Program entrant
- w/o = Walkover
- r = Retired
- d = Defaulted

=== Draw ===
First round
1	(United States) R Leach (United States) J Pugh	6	6
(United States) B Dickinson (France) JP Fleurian	2	3
(France) J Potier (France) É Winogradsky	3	4
(Italy) C Panatta (Netherlands) M Schapers	6	6
3	(Iran) M Bahrami (Czechoslovakia) J Navrátil	3	6	6
(Switzerland) N Günthardt (Italy) D Nargiso	6	4	7
(Austria) A Antonitsch (West Germany) U Riglewski	6	6
(Italy) M Fioroni (Czechoslovakia) L Pimek	3	1
(France) T Benhabiles (Soviet Union) A Chesnokov	6	4	6
(Czechoslovakia) J Čihák (Czechoslovakia) C Suk	4	6	4
(West Germany) T Meinecke (West Germany) R Osterthun	5	2
4	(France) G Forget (France) H Leconte	7	6
(Sweden) J Gunnarsson (Sweden) N Kroon	6	6	6
(France) L Courteau (United States) L Jensen	7	3	4
(United States) J Arias (Romania) F Segărceanu	7	7
2	(Sweden) J Nyström (Sweden) M Tideman	6	6

Quarterfinals
1	(United States) R Leach (United States) J Pugh	6	7
(Italy) C Panatta (Netherlands) M Schapers	2	5
(Switzerland) N Günthardt (Italy) D Nargiso	6	7
(Austria) A Antonitsch (West Germany) U Riglewski	2	5
(France) T Benhabiles (Soviet Union) A Chesnokov	4	2
4	(France) G Forget (France) H Leconte	6	6
(Sweden) J Gunnarsson (Sweden) N Kroon	5	4
(United States) J Arias (Romania) F Segărceanu	7	6

Semifinals
1	(United States) R Leach (United States) J Pugh	6	6	4
(Switzerland) N Günthardt (Italy) D Nargiso	3	7	6
4	(France) G Forget (France) H Leconte	7	6
(United States) J Arias (Romania) F Segărceanu	6	2

Final
(Switzerland) N Günthardt (Italy) D Nargiso	6	3	4
4	(France) G Forget (France) H Leconte	4	6	6
