= 1988 Swatch Open =

Men's tennis tournament

- Date: 11–17 April
- Edition: 17th
- Category: Grand Prix
- Draw: 32S / 16D
- Prize money: $115,000
- Surface: Clay / outdoor
- Location: Nice, France
- Venue: Nice Lawn Tennis Club

Champions

Singles
- (France) Henri Leconte

Doubles
- (France) Guy Forget / (France) Henri Leconte
← 1987 ·	Open de Nice Côte d'Azur	· 1989 →

The 1988 Swatch Open was a men's tennis tournament played on outdoor clay courts at the Nice Lawn Tennis Club in Nice, France, and was part of the 1988 Nabisco Grand Prix. It was the 17th edition of the tournament and took place from 11 April through 17 April 1988. Third-seeded Henri Leconte, who entered the event on a wildcard, won the singles title. It was his second singles title at the event after 1985.

== Finals ==
=== Singles ===
(France) Henri Leconte defeated (France) Jérôme Potier 6–2, 6–2

- It was Leconte's 1st singles title of the year and the 7th of his career.

=== Doubles ===
(France) Guy Forget / (France) Henri Leconte defeated (Switzerland) Heinz Günthardt / (Italy) Diego Nargiso 4–6, 6–3, 6–4
