= 1986 Nice International Open – Doubles =

Doubles
- 1986 Nice International Open

Final
- Champions: (Switzerland) Jakob Hlasek (Czechoslovakia) Pavel Složil
- Runners-up: (United States) Gary Donnelly (United Kingdom) Colin Dowdeswell
- Score: 6–3, 3–6, 11–9

Events
Singles	Doubles
← 1985 ·	Open de Nice Côte d'Azur	· 1987 →

Claudio Panatta and Pavel Složil were the defending champions, but competed this year with different partners.

Panatta teamed up with Andreas Maurer and lost in the first round to Nelson Aerts and Mark Woodforde.

Složil teamed up with Jakob Hlasek and successfully defended his title, by defeating Gary Donnelly and Colin Dowdeswell 6–3, 3–6, 11–9 in the final.

== Seeds ==
1. (France) Guy Forget / (France) Yannick Noah (semifinals)
2. (Spain) Sergio Casal / (Spain) Emilio Sánchez (first round)
3. (United States) Gary Donnelly / (United Kingdom) Colin Dowdeswell (final)
4. (Denmark) Michael Mortensen / (Sweden) Hans Simonsson (first round)

== Draw ==
=== Key ===
- Q = Qualifier
- WC = Wild card
- LL = Lucky loser
- Alt = Alternate
- SE = Special exempt
- PR = Protected ranking
- ITF = ITF entry
- JE = Junior exempt
- w/o = Walkover
- r = Retired
- d = Defaulted
- SR = Special ranking

=== Draw ===
First round
1	(France) G Forget (France) Y Noah	6	6
(United Kingdom) J Bates (New Zealand) B Derlin	3	4
(Spain) J Arrese (Spain) J Bardou	6	3	4
(Netherlands) T Nijssen (Netherlands) M Schapers	2	6	6
4	(Denmark) M Mortensen (Sweden) H Simonsson	2	1
(Switzerland) J Hlasek (Czechoslovakia) P Složil	6	6
(Brazil) N Aerts (Australia) M Woodforde	6	6
(West Germany) A Maurer (Italy) C Panatta	3	3
(Czechoslovakia) J Navrátil (Sweden) P Svensson	6	6
WC	(France) J Potier (France) T Tulasne	1	0
(Sweden) S Eriksson (Sweden) M Tideman	3	6	3
3	(United States) G Donnelly (United Kingdom) C Dowdeswell	6	1	6
(Sweden) J Gunnarsson (Sweden) P Lundgren	3	6	1
(Australia) B Dyke (Australia) L Warder	6	4	6
(Australia) D Cahill (Australia) M Kratzmann	6	7
2	(Spain) S Casal (Spain) E Sánchez	3	5

Quarterfinals
1	(France) G Forget (France) Y Noah	6	6
(Netherlands) T Nijssen (Netherlands) M Schapers	3	4
(Switzerland) J Hlasek (Czechoslovakia) P Složil	6	6
(Brazil) N Aerts (Australia) M Woodforde	3	4
(Czechoslovakia) J Navrátil (Sweden) P Svensson	3	6	3
3	(United States) G Donnelly (United Kingdom) C Dowdeswell	6	3	6
(Australia) B Dyke (Australia) L Warder	5	6	6
(Australia) D Cahill (Australia) M Kratzmann	7	3	4

Semifinals
1	(France) G Forget (France) Y Noah	6	6	3
(Switzerland) J Hlasek (Czechoslovakia) P Složil	3	7	6
3	(United States) G Donnelly (United Kingdom) C Dowdeswell	6	4	6
(Australia) B Dyke (Australia) L Warder	0	6	3

Final
(Switzerland) J Hlasek (Czechoslovakia) P Složil	6	4	11
3	(United States) G Donnelly (United Kingdom) C Dowdeswell	3	6	9
