= 1986 Nice International Open – Singles =

Singles
- 1986 Nice International Open

Final
- Champion: (Spain) Emilio Sánchez
- Runner-up: (Australia) Paul McNamee
- Score: 6–1, 6–3

Details
- Draw: 32 (3WC/3Q/2SE)
- Seeds: 8

Events
Singles	Doubles
← 1985 ·	Open de Nice Côte d'Azur	· 1987 →

Henri Leconte was the defending champion, but did not compete this year.

Emilio Sánchez won the title by defeating Paul McNamee 6–1, 6–3 in the final.

== Seeds ==
1. (France) Thierry Tulasne (quarterfinals)
2. (Argentina) Martín Jaite (first round)
3. (Sweden) Mikael Pernfors (first round)
4. (France) Guy Forget (second round)
5. (West Germany) Andreas Maurer (second round)
6. (Sweden) Peter Lundgren (first round)
7. (Spain) Sergio Casal (semifinals)
8. (Peru) Jaime Yzaga (first round)

== Draw ==
=== Key ===
- Q = Qualifier
- WC = Wild card
- LL = Lucky loser
- Alt = Alternate
- SE = Special exempt
- PR = Protected ranking
- ITF = ITF entry
- JE = Junior exempt
- w/o = Walkover
- r = Retired
- d = Defaulted
- SR = Special ranking

=== Finals ===
Semifinals
(Australia) Paul McNamee	4	7	6
Q	(Spain) Jordi Arrese	6	6	4
(Spain) Emilio Sánchez	7	6
7	(Spain) Sergio Casal	5	2

Final
(Australia) Paul McNamee	1	3
(Spain) Emilio Sánchez	6	6

=== Top half ===
First round
1	(France) T Tulasne	6	6
(West Germany) H Schwaier	3	0
(Uruguay) D Pérez	5	6	6
(Peru) P Arraya	7	3	4
Q	(Italy) C Pistolesi	6	6
WC	(Paraguay) V Pecci	3	2
(Australia) P McNamee	6	6
8	(Peru) J Yzaga	3	3
4	(France) G Forget	5	6	6
(United States) L Duncan	7	4	2
Q	(Romania) F Segărceanu	6	7
(Haiti) R Agénor	2	6
Q	(Spain) J Arrese	7	6
(Argentina) M Ingaramo	6	0
WC	(France) T Champion	4	0
5	(West Germany) A Maurer	6	6

Second round
1	(France) T Tulasne	3	6	6
(Uruguay) D Pérez	6	1	1
Q	(Italy) C Pistolesi	4	3
(Australia) P McNamee	6	6
4	(France) G Forget	6	0	1
Q	(Romania) F Segărceanu	4	6	6
Q	(Spain) J Arrese	6	7
5	(West Germany) A Maurer	2	6

Quarterfinals
1	(France) T Tulasne	5	4
(Australia) P McNamee	7	6
Q	(Romania) F Segărceanu	3	1
Q	(Spain) J Arrese	6	6

Semifinals
(Australia) P McNamee	4	7	6
Q	(Spain) J Arrese	6	6	4

=== Bottom half ===
First round
6	(Sweden) P Lundgren	2	3
WC	(France) T Benhabiles	6	6
Q	(Spain) F Luna	1	6	3
(Italy) F Cancellotti	6	3	6
(Australia) M Woodforde	6	7
SE	(Spain) J López-Maeso	4	6
(Spain) E Sánchez	6	4	6
3	(Sweden) M Pernfors	3	6	4
7	(Spain) S Casal	6	6
(Netherlands) M Schapers	4	4
(Argentina) R Argüello	6	6
(United States) J Brown	1	4
(Czechoslovakia) M Vajda	7	6
(Spain) J Aguilera	5	2
SE	(Argentina) H de la Peña	7	6
2	(Argentina) M Jaite	5	3

Second round
WC	(France) T Benhabiles	1	6	6
(Italy) F Cancellotti	6	2	4
(Australia) M Woodforde	2	3
(Spain) E Sánchez	6	6
7	(Spain) S Casal	6	6
(Argentina) R Argüello	1	2
(Czechoslovakia) M Vajda	7	3	7
SE	(Argentina) H de la Peña	5	6	5

Quarterfinals
WC	(France) T Benhabiles	2	0
(Spain) E Sánchez	6	6
7	(Spain) S Casal	6	2	6
(Czechoslovakia) M Vajda	4	6	2

Semifinals
(Spain) E Sánchez	7	6
7	(Spain) S Casal	5	2
