= 1988 Swatch Open – Singles =

Singles
- 1988 Swatch Open

Final
- Champion: (France) Henri Leconte
- Runner-up: (France) Jérôme Potier
- Score: 6–2, 6–2

Details
- Draw: 32 (3WC/4Q)
- Seeds: 8

Events
| Singles | Doubles |
| ← 1987 · | Open de Nice Côte d'Azur | · 1989 → |

Henri Leconte won the singles title of the 1988 Swatch Open tennis tournament by defeating Jérôme Potier 6–2, 6–2 in the final. It was the 7th title for Leconte on his career and the first one since 1986, when he won his last two titles at Geneva and Hamburg.

== Seeds ==
1. (Soviet Union) Andrei Chesnokov (semifinals)
2. (Sweden) Joakim Nyström (first round)
3. (France) Henri Leconte (champion)
4. (United States) Jimmy Arias (first round)
5. (Haiti) Ronald Agénor (quarterfinals)
6. (Australia) Mark Woodforde (first round)
7. (United States) Jim Pugh (first round)
8. (France) Guy Forget (semifinals)

== Draw ==
=== Key ===
- Q = Qualifier
- WC = Wild card
- LL = Lucky loser
- Alt = Alternate
- ITF = ITF entry
- PR = Protected ranking
- SR = Special ranking
- SE = Special exempt
- JE = Junior exempt
- JR = Junior Accelerator Programme entrant
- CO = College Accelerator Programme entrant
- NG = Next Gen Accelerator Program entrant
- w/o = Walkover
- r = Retired
- d = Defaulted

=== Finals ===
Semifinals
1 | (Soviet Union) Andrei Chesnokov | 6 | 5 | 3
3/WC | (France) Henri Leconte | 4 | 7 | 6
(France) Jérôme Potier | 6 | 7
8 | (France) Guy Forget | 3 | 6

Final
3/WC | (France) Henri Leconte | 6 | 6
(France) Jérôme Potier | 2 | 2

=== Top half ===
First round
1 | (Soviet Union) A Chesnokov | 7 | 6
Q | (Italy) M Fioroni | 5 | 2
(West Germany) R Osterthun | 6 | 3
(Austria) H Skoff | 7 | 6
Q | (Argentina) G Garetto | 3 | 6
(France) JP Fleurian | 6 | 7
(Czechoslovakia) K Nováček | 6 | 7
7 | (United States) J Pugh | 3 | 6
3/WC | (France) H Leconte | 7 | 6
Q | (Italy) D Nargiso | 5 | 1
(Czechoslovakia) J Čihák | 2 | 6
(West Germany) T Meinecke | 6 | 7
Q | (West Germany) A Lesch | 6 | 7
(Australia) D Cahill | 3 | 5
(Czechoslovakia) J Navratil | 3 | 2
5 | (Haiti) R Agénor | 6 | 6

Second round
1 | (Soviet Union) A Chesnokov | 6 | 1 | 6
(Austria) H Skoff | 4 | 6 | 4
(France) JP Fleurian | 7 | 4 | 1
(Czechoslovakia) K Nováček | 6 | 6 | 6
3/WC | (France) H Leconte | 6 | 6 | 6
(West Germany) T Meinecke | 4 | 7 | 4
Q | (West Germany) A Lesch | 3 | 7 | 3
5 | (Haiti) R Agénor | 6 | 5 | 6

Quarterfinals
1 | (Soviet Union) A Chesnokov | 7 | 6
(Czechoslovakia) K Nováček | 5 | 1
3/WC | (France) H Leconte | 5 | 7 | 6
5 | (Haiti) R Agénor | 7 | 5 | 1

Semifinals
1 | (Soviet Union) A Chesnokov | 6 | 5 | 3
3/WC | (France) H Leconte | 4 | 7 | 6

=== Bottom half ===
First round
6 | (Australia) M Woodforde | 5 | 2
(Spain) J Arrese | 7 | 6
(Senegal) Y Doumbia | 4 | 0
(Czechoslovakia) L Pimek | 6 | 6
(France) T Benhabiles | 5 | 6
(France) T Tulasne | 7 | 7
(France) J Potier | 3 | 6 | 6
4/WC | (United States) J Arias | 6 | 2 | 4
8 | (France) G Forget | 6 | 6
(France) T Champion | 3 | 3
(Sweden) N Kroon | 6 | 6
(Romania) F Segărceanu | 0 | 4
WC | (Argentina) G Vilas | 6 | 6
(West Germany) A Maurer | 3 | 1
(Sweden) J Gunnarsson | 7 | 6
2 | (Sweden) J Nyström | 5 | 3

Second round
(Spain) J Arrese | 6 | 6
(Czechoslovakia) L Pimek | 3 | 4
(France) T Tulasne | 3 | 6
(France) J Potier | 6 | 7
8 | (France) G Forget | 6 | 6
(Sweden) N Kroon | 2 | 2
WC | (Argentina) G Vilas | 6 | 6 | 6
(Sweden) J Gunnarsson | 7 | 3 | 4

Quarterfinals
(Spain) J Arrese | 6 | 2
(France) J Potier | 7 | 6
8 | (France) G Forget | 6 | 6
WC | (Argentina) G Vilas | 3 | 3

Semifinals
(France) J Potier | 6 | 7
8 | (France) G Forget | 3 | 6
