= 1990 Philips Open – Singles =

Singles
- 1990 Philips Open

Final
- Champion: (Spain) Juan Aguilera
- Runner-up: (France) Guy Forget
- Score: 2–6, 6–3, 6–4

Details
- Draw: 32 (3WC/4Q)
- Seeds: 8

Events
Singles	Doubles
← 1989 ·	Open de Nice Côte d'Azur	· 1991 →

Andrei Chesnokov was the defending champion, but lost in the second round to Fabrice Santoro.

Juan Aguilera won the title by defeating Guy Forget 2–6, 6–3, 6–4 in the final.

== Seeds ==
1. (United States) Jay Berger (quarterfinals)
2. (Argentina) Alberto Mancini (first round)
3. (Austria) Horst Skoff (first round)
4. (Soviet Union) Andrei Chesnokov (second round)
5. (France) Yannick Noah (first round)
6. (Argentina) Guillermo Pérez Roldán (second round, retired)
7. (Czechoslovakia) Petr Korda (first round)
8. (Spain) Jordi Arrese (first round)

== Draw ==
=== Key ===
- Q = Qualifier
- WC = Wild card
- LL = Lucky loser
- Alt = Alternate
- ITF = ITF entry
- PR = Protected ranking
- SR = Special ranking
- SE = Special exempt
- JE = Junior exempt
- JR = Junior Accelerator Programme entrant
- CO = College Accelerator Programme entrant
- NG = Next Gen Accelerator Program entrant
- w/o = Walkover
- r = Retired
- d = Defaulted

=== Finals ===
Semifinals
(Soviet Union) Andrei Cherkasov	6	6	4
WC	(France) Guy Forget	4	7	6
(Switzerland) Marc Rosset	3	0
(Spain) Juan Aguilera	6	6

Final
WC	(France) Guy Forget	6	3	4
(Spain) Juan Aguilera	2	6	6

=== Top half ===
First round
1/WC	(United States) J Berger	7	6
Q	(France) O Soules	6	3
(Uruguay) M Filippini	6	3
Q	(France) H Leconte	7	6
(West Germany) M Stich	6	3	6
(United States) J Arias	3	6	3
(Soviet Union) A Cherkasov	0	7	7
7	(Czechoslovakia) P Korda	6	5	5
3	(Austria) H Skoff	6	4	1
(Sweden) N Kroon	2	6	6
(Finland) V Paloheimo	2	5
WC	(France) G Forget	6	7
(Sweden) J Gunnarsson	6	5
(Socialist Federal Republic of Yugoslavia) G Prpić	7	7
(Haiti) R Agénor	6	3	4
6	(Argentina) G Pérez Roldán	1	6	6

Second round
1/WC	(United States) J Berger	6	1	7
Q	(France) H Leconte	3	6	6
(West Germany) M Stich	4	4
(Soviet Union) A Cherkasov	6	6
(Sweden) N Kroon	6	1
WC	(France) G Forget	7	6
(Socialist Federal Republic of Yugoslavia) G Prpić	7	6	2
6	(Argentina) G Pérez Roldán	5	7	0^{r}

Quarterfinals
1/WC	(United States) J Berger	6	2	3
(Soviet Union) A Cherkasov	2	6	6
WC	(France) G Forget	7	6
(Socialist Federal Republic of Yugoslavia) G Prpić	6	2

Semifinals
(Soviet Union) A Cherkasov	6	6	4
WC	(France) G Forget	4	7	6

=== Bottom half ===
First round
5	(France) Y Noah	7	3	3
(Switzerland) M Rosset	5	6	6
(Spain) T Carbonell	6	6
(Czechoslovakia) M Střelba	3	1
(France) JP Fleurian	6	2
WC	(France) F Santoro	7	6
(Czechoslovakia) K Nováček	6	1
4	(Soviet Union) A Chesnokov	7	6
8	(Spain) J Arrese	6	3	4
(Finland) A Rahunen	3	6	6
(Spain) J Sánchez	4	6	1
(Spain) J Aguilera	6	2	6
(Switzerland) J Hlasek	3	6	6
Q	(France) T Tulasne	6	4	4
Q	(Italy) C Pistolesi	6	6
2	(Argentina) A Mancini	4	3

Second round
(Switzerland) M Rosset	7	4	6
(Spain) T Carbonell	6	6	4
WC	(France) F Santoro	6	6
4	(Soviet Union) A Chesnokov	3	4
(Finland) A Rahunen	2	6	4
(Spain) J Aguilera	6	2	6
(Switzerland) J Hlasek	6	6
Q	(Italy) C Pistolesi	4	4

Quarterfinals
(Switzerland) M Rosset	6	5	6
WC	(France) F Santoro	0	7	2
(Spain) J Aguilera	6	6
(Switzerland) J Hlasek	4	4

Semifinals
(Switzerland) M Rosset	3	0
(Spain) J Aguilera	6	6
