= 1989 Swatch Open – Singles =

Singles
- 1989 Swatch Open

Final
- Champion: (Soviet Union) Andrei Chesnokov
- Runner-up: (France) Jérôme Potier
- Score: 6–4, 6–4

Details
- Draw: 32
- Seeds: 8

Events
Singles	Doubles
← 1988 ·	Swatch Open	· 1990 →

Henri Leconte was the defending champion but lost in the second round to Goran Ivanišević.

Andrei Chesnokov won in the final 6–4, 6–4 against Jérôme Potier.

== Seeds ==
A champion seed is indicated in bold text while text in italics indicates the round in which that seed was eliminated.

1. (Sweden) Kent Carlsson (first round)
2. (France) Henri Leconte (second round)
3. (Argentina) Guillermo Pérez Roldán (quarterfinals)
4. (Haiti) Ronald Agénor (second round)
5. (Argentina) Alberto Mancini (quarterfinals)
6. (Soviet Union) **Andrei Chesnokov (champion)**
7. (Austria) Horst Skoff (second round)
8. (Spain) Jordi Arrese (second round)

== Draw ==
=== Key ===
- Q = Qualifier
- WC = Wild card
- LL = Lucky loser
- Alt = Alternate
- SE = Special exempt
- PR = Protected ranking
- ITF = ITF entry
- JE = Junior exempt
- w/o = Walkover
- r = Retired
- d = Defaulted
- SR = Special ranking

First round
1	(Sweden) K Carlsson	0	**6**	2
(Italy) **C Pistolesi**	**6**	3	**6**
Q	(Uruguay) **D Pérez**	**6**	**6**
(Italy) D Nargiso	3	2
(West Germany) U Riglewski	**6**	4	2
(Italy) **F Cancellotti**	3	**6**	**6**
Q	(Netherlands) M Koevermans	4	4
7	(Austria) **H Skoff**	**6**	**6**
4	(Haiti) **R Agénor**	**7**	**6**
(West Germany) T Meinecke	5	3
(Netherlands) T Nijssen	3	**6**	5
WC	(France) **J Potier**	**6**	3	**7**
(Czechoslovakia) **K Nováček**	**6**	**6**
(Czechoslovakia) T Šmíd	1	4
(Sweden) J Gunnarsson	4	3
5	(Argentina) **A Mancini**	**6**	**6**
6	(Soviet Union) **A Chesnokov**	**6**	**6**
(Australia) J Frawley	0	2
(United States) **L Duncan**	**6**	**6**
(France) T Tulasne	2	1
WC	(France) A Boetsch	2	4
Q	(Iran) **M Bahrami**	**6**	**6**
(Belgium) E Masso	0	0
3	(Argentina) **G Pérez Roldán**	**6**	**6**
8	(Spain) **J Arrese**	**6**	**6**
WC	(Argentina) G Vilas	0	2
(Spain) **F Luna**	**6**	**7**
(Argentina) F Davín	2	6
(Czechoslovakia) M Střelba	1	1
(Socialist Federal Republic of Yugoslavia) **G Ivanišević**	**6**	**6**
Q	(France) C Pioline	5	**6**	3
2	(France) **H Leconte**	**7**	4	**6**

Second round
(Italy) **C Pistolesi**	**6**	**6**
Q	(Uruguay) D Pérez	3	2
(Italy) **F Cancellotti**	5	**6**	**6**
7	(Austria) H Skoff	**7**	4	4
4	(Haiti) R Agénor	**6**	3	6
WC	(France) **J Potier**	4	**6**	**7**
(Czechoslovakia) K Nováček	6	**7**	4
5	(Argentina) **A Mancini**	**7**	6	**6**
6	(Soviet Union) **A Chesnokov**	**6**	**6**
(United States) L Duncan	1	1
Q	(Iran) M Bahrami	5	1
3	(Argentina) **G Pérez Roldán**	**7**	**6**
8	(Spain) J Arrese	6	**6**	5
(Spain) **F Luna**	**7**	1	**7**
(Socialist Federal Republic of Yugoslavia) **G Ivanišević**	**6**	4	**6**
2	(France) H Leconte	4	**6**	3

Quarterfinals
(Italy) C Pistolesi	**6**	3	2
(Italy) **F Cancellotti**	4	**6**	**6**
WC	(France) **J Potier**	2	**6**	**6**
5	(Argentina) A Mancini	**6**	4	2
6	(Soviet Union) **A Chesnokov**	**7**	**6**
3	(Argentina) G Pérez Roldán	6	4
(Spain) F Luna	6	3
(Socialist Federal Republic of Yugoslavia) **G Ivanišević**	**7**	**6**

Semifinals
(Italy) F Cancellotti	5	4
WC	(France) **J Potier**	**7**	**6**
6	(Soviet Union) **A Chesnokov**	**6**	6	**7**
(Socialist Federal Republic of Yugoslavia) G Ivanišević	4	**7**	6

Final
WC	(France) Jérôme Potier	4	4
6	(Soviet Union) **Andrei Chesnokov**	**6**	**6**
