= 1990 Philips Open Nice =

1990 Philips Open
- Date: 16–22 April
- Edition: 19th
- Category: World Series
- Draw: 32S / 16D
- Prize money: $225,000
- Surface: Clay / outdoor
- Location: Nice, France
- Venue: Nice Lawn Tennis Club

Champions

Singles
- (Spain) Juan Aguilera

Doubles
- (Argentina) Alberto Mancini / (France) Yannick Noah
| ← 1989 · | Open de Nice Côte d'Azur | · 1991 → |

The 1990 Philips Open was a men's tennis tournament played on outdoor clay courts at the Nice Lawn Tennis Club in Nice, France, and was part of the World Series of the 1990 ATP Tour. It was the 19th edition of the tournament and took place from 16 April through 22 April 1990. Unseeded Juan Aguilera won the singles title.

== Finals ==
=== Singles ===
(Spain) Juan Aguilera defeated (France) Guy Forget 2–6, 6–3, 6–4

- It was Aguilera's 1st singles title of the year and the 4th of his career.

=== Doubles ===
(Argentina) Alberto Mancini / (France) Yannick Noah defeated (Uruguay) Marcelo Filippini / (Austria) Horst Skoff 6–4, 7–6
