= 1982 U.S. Clay Court Championships – Men's doubles =

Men's doubles
- 1982 U.S. Clay Court Championships

Final
- Champions: (United States) Sherwood Stewart (United States) Ferdi Taygan
- Runners-up: (South Africa) Robbie Venter (United States) Blaine Willenborg
- Score: 6–4, 7–5

Details
- Draw: 32
- Seeds: 8

Events
Singles	men	women
Doubles	men	women
- U.S. Clay Court Championships

Top-seeded pair Sherwood Stewart and Ferdi Taygan won the title after beating Robbie Venter and Blaine Willenborg in the final.

== Seeds ==
A champion seed is indicated in bold text while text in italics indicates the round in which that seed was eliminated.

1. (United States) **Sherwood Stewart / (United States) Ferdi Taygan (champions)**
2. (Chile) Hans Gildemeister / (Ecuador) Andrés Gómez (semifinals)
3. (Australia) Mark Edmondson / (Australia) Kim Warwick (first round)
4. (Sweden) Anders Järryd / (Sweden) Hans Simonsson (first round)
5. N/A
6. (Australia) Darren Cahill / (United States) Terry Moor (second round)
7. (United States) Steve Meister / (United States) Craig Wittus (semifinals)
8. (United States) Tracy Delatte / (United States) Mel Purcell (second round)

== Draw ==
Key

- Q = Qualifier
- WC = Wild card
- LL = Lucky loser
- Alt = Alternate
- ITF = ITF entry
- PR = Protected ranking
- SR = Special ranking
- SE = Special exempt
- JE = Junior exempt
- JR = Junior Accelerator Programme entrant
- CO = College Accelerator Programme entrant
- NG = Next Gen Accelerator Program entrant
- w/o = Walkover
- r = Retired
- d = Defaulted

=== Finals ===
Semifinals
1	**(United States) Sherwood Stewart** **(United States) Ferdi Taygan**	**6**	**6**
7	(United States) Steve Meister (United States) Craig Wittus	4	3
**(South Africa) Robbie Venter** **(United States) Blaine Willenborg**	**6**	3	**6**
2	(Chile) Hans Gildemeister (Ecuador) Andrés Gómez	3	**6**	3

Final
1	**(United States) Sherwood Stewart** **(United States) Ferdi Taygan**	**6**	**7**
(South Africa) Robbie Venter (United States) Blaine Willenborg	4	5

=== Top half ===
First round
1	**(United States) S Stewart** **(United States) F Taygan**	**6**	3	**6**
(Chile) R Acuña (Czechoslovakia) J Granát	1	**6**	4
**(Australia) C Letcher** **(United Kingdom) J Smith**	**7**	**6**
(Colombia) A Cortes (United States) C Edwards	6	4
**(Australia) B Guan** **(Australia) W Maher**	**7**	**7**
(India) A Amritraj (United States) T Wilkison	5	6
**(France) J Potier** **(France) J Vanier**	4	**6**	**6**
(Sweden) J Nyström (Sweden) M Wilander	**6**	3	4
3	(Australia) M Edmondson (Australia) K Warwick	5	6
**(United States) R Fagel** **(Spain) G Urpí**	**7**	**7**
**(Chile) JC Ayala** **(Spain) J López-Maeso**	**7**	6	**8**
(United States) S Carnahan (United States) W Redondo	5	**7**	6
**(Australia) G MacDonald** **(United States) Armand Molino**	**6**	**6**
(Spain) J Avendaño (Spain) S Casal	3	2
(Australia) J Alexander (Australia) R Case	3	1
7	**(United States) S Meister** **(United States) C Wittus**	**6**	**6**

Second round
1	**(United States) S Stewart** **(United States) F Taygan**	**7**	**6**
(Australia) C Letcher (United Kingdom) J Smith	6	3
**(Australia) B Guan** **(Australia) W Maher**	**6**	**6**
(France) J Potier (France) J Vanier	4	0
**(United States) R Fagel** **(Spain) G Urpí**	**6**	**6**
(Chile) JC Ayala (Spain) J López-Maeso	4	2
(Australia) G MacDonald (United States) A Molino	**6**	1	4
7	**(United States) S Meister** **(United States) C Wittus**	2	**6**	**6**

Quarterfinals
1	**(United States) S Stewart** **(United States) F Taygan**	0	**6**	**6**
(Australia) B Guan (Australia) W Maher	**6**	2	1
(United States) R Fagel (Spain) G Urpí	6	5
7	**(United States) S Meister** **(United States) C Wittus**	**7**	**7**

Semifinals
1	**(United States) S Stewart** **(United States) F Taygan**	**6**	**6**
7	(United States) S Meister (United States) C Wittus	4	3

=== Bottom half ===
First round
6	**(Australia) D Cahill** **(United States) T Moor**	**6**	5	**6**
(Ecuador) G Núñez (Ecuador) H Núñez	3	**7**	2
**(Czechoslovakia) S Birner** **(Sweden) S Simonsson**	**6**	**6**
(United States) J Gurfein (United States) J Hayes	4	1
**(United States) E Fromm** **(United States) S Krulevitz**	**7**	5	**6**
(Argentina) A Ganzábal (Argentina) A Gattiker	5	**7**	1
**(South Africa) R Venter** **(United States) B Willenborg**	**7**	**6**
4	(Sweden) A Järryd (Sweden) H Simonsson	5	1
8	**(United States) T Delatte** **(United States) M Purcell**	**6**	**6**
(Uruguay) JL Damiani (France) G Moretton	3	2
**(Switzerland) C Dowdeswell** **(South Africa) F Sauer**	4	**6**	**9**
(Spain) Á Giménez (Italy) C Panatta	**6**	3	7
**(Peru) P Arraya** **(West Germany) R Gehring**	**6**	5	**6**
(Australia) B Drewett (Australia) CA Miller	4	**7**	2
(United States) R Baxter (South Africa) B Levine	**6**	4	4
2	**(Chile) H Gildemeister** **(Ecuador) A Gómez**	4	**6**	**6**

Second round
6	(Australia) D Cahill (United States) T Moor	3	4
**(Czechoslovakia) S Birner** **(Sweden) S Simonsson**	**6**	**6**
(United States) E Fromm (United States) S Krulevitz	**6**	1	4
**(South Africa) R Venter** **(United States) B Willenborg**	2	**6**	**6**
8	(United States) T Delatte (United States) M Purcell	3	3
**(Switzerland) C Dowdeswell** **(South Africa) F Sauer**	**6**	**6**
(Peru) P Arraya (West Germany) R Gehring	3	4
2	**(Chile) H Gildemeister** **(Ecuador) A Gómez**	**6**	**6**

Quarterfinals
(Czechoslovakia) S Birner (Sweden) S Simonsson	6	2
**(South Africa) R Venter** **(United States) B Willenborg**	**7**	**6**
(Switzerland) C Dowdeswell (South Africa) F Sauer	1	2
2	**(Chile) H Gildemeister** **(Ecuador) A Gómez**	**6**	**6**

Semifinals
**(South Africa) R Venter** **(United States) B Willenborg**	**6**	3	**6**
2	(Chile) H Gildemeister (Ecuador) A Gómez	3	**6**	3
