= 1989 Swatch Open – Doubles =

Doubles
- 1989 Swatch Open
- 1988 Champions: (France) Guy Forget (France) Henri Leconte

Final
- Champions: (West Germany) Ricki Osterthun (West Germany) Udo Riglewski
- Runners-up: (Switzerland) Heinz Günthardt (Hungary) Balázs Taróczy
- Score: 7–6, 6–7, 6–1

Details
- Draw: 16
- Seeds: 4

Events
| Singles | Doubles |
- Swatch Open

Guy Forget and Henri Leconte were the defending champions but only Leconte competed that year with Eric Winogradsky.

Leconte and Winogradsky lost in the quarterfinals to Heinz Günthardt and Balázs Taróczy.

Ricki Osterthun and Udo Riglewski won in the final 7–6, 6–7, 6–1 against Günthardt and Taróczy.

== Seeds ==
Champion seeds are indicated in bold text while text in italics indicates the round in which those seeds were eliminated.

1. (Italy) Claudio Panatta / (Czechoslovakia) Tomáš Šmíd (first round)
2. (Switzerland) Heinz Günthardt / (Hungary) Balázs Taróczy (final)
3. (Sweden) Jan Gunnarsson / (Denmark) Michael Mortensen (quarterfinals)
4. (Netherlands) Mark Koevermans / (Netherlands) Tom Nijssen (first round)

== Draw ==
Key

- Q = Qualifier
- WC = Wild card
- LL = Lucky loser
- Alt = Alternate
- ITF = ITF entry
- PR = Protected ranking
- SR = Special ranking
- SE = Special exempt
- JE = Junior exempt
- JR = Junior Accelerator Programme entrant
- CO = College Accelerator Programme entrant
- NG = Next Gen Accelerator Program entrant
- w/o = Walkover
- r = Retired
- d = Defaulted

First round
1 | (Italy) C Panatta (Czechoslovakia) T Šmíd | 4 | 3
(Belgium) **E Masso** (Italy) **D Nargiso** | **6** | **6**
(West Germany) **T Meinecke** (West Germany) **M Stich** | **6** | **6**
(Sweden) R Båthman (Sweden) R Bergh | 2 | 3
3 | (Sweden) **J Gunnarsson** (Denmark) **M Mortensen** | 4 | **7** | **7**
(Iran) M Bahrami (Uruguay) D Pérez | **6** | 6 | 6
(West Germany) **R Osterthun** (West Germany) **U Riglewski** | **7** | **6**
(Peru) P Arraya (Sweden) L-A Wahlgren | 6 | 4
(Socialist Federal Republic of Yugoslavia) G Ivanišević (Austria) H Skoff | 4 | 4
(Argentina) **G Luza** (Argentina) **G Pérez Roldán** | **6** | **6**
(Sweden) **N Kroon** (Czechoslovakia) **K Nováček** | 6 | **6** | **7**
4 | (Netherlands) M Koevermans (Netherlands) T Nijssen | **7** | 3 | 6
(France) **H Leconte** (France) **E Winogradsky** | **6** | **6**
(France) J Potier (France) T Tulasne | 2 | 4
(France) A Boetsch (France) T Champion | 2 | 2
2 | (Switzerland) **H Günthardt** (Hungary) **B Taróczy** | **6** | **6**

Quarterfinals
(Belgium) **E Masso** (Italy) **D Nargiso** | 6 | **6** | **7**
(West Germany) T Meinecke (West Germany) M Stich | **7** | 1 | 6
3 | (Sweden) J Gunnarsson (Denmark) M Mortensen | **6** | 3 | 3
(West Germany) **R Osterthun** (West Germany) **U Riglewski** | 4 | **6** | **6**
(Argentina) G Luza (Argentina) G Pérez Roldán | 4 | **6** | 4
(Sweden) **N Kroon** (Czechoslovakia) **K Nováček** | **6** | 4 | **6**
(France) H Leconte (France) E Winogradsky | 5 | 5
2 | (Switzerland) **H Günthardt** (Hungary) **B Taróczy** | **7** | **7**

Semifinals
(Belgium) E Masso (Italy) D Nargiso | 6 | **6** | 6
(West Germany) **R Osterthun** (West Germany) **U Riglewski** | **7** | 3 | **7**
(Sweden) N Kroon (Czechoslovakia) K Nováček | 3 | 6
2 | (Switzerland) **H Günthardt** (Hungary) **B Taróczy** | **6** | **7**

Final
(West Germany) **Ricki Osterthun** (West Germany) **Udo Riglewski** | **7** | 6 | **6**
2 | (Switzerland) Heinz Günthardt (Hungary) Balázs Taróczy | 6 | **7** | 1
