= 1982 U.S. Clay Court Championships – Women's singles =

Women's singles
- 1982 U.S. Clay Court Championships

Final
- Champion: (Romania) Virginia Ruzici
- Runner-up: (Czechoslovakia) Helena Suková
- Score: 6–2, 6–0

Events
| Singles | men | women |
| Doubles | men | women |
| ← 1981 · | U.S. Clay Court Championships | · 1983 → |

Top-seed Virginia Ruzici won the final and $24,000 first prize money by defeating seventh-seeded Helena Suková in the final.

== Seeds ==
The top eight seeds received a bye into the second round. A champion seed is indicated in bold text while text in italics indicates the round in which that seed was eliminated.

1. (Romania) Virginia Ruzici **(champion)**
2. (United States) Kathy Rinaldi (semifinals)
3. (United States) Zina Garrison (third round)
4. (United States) Bonnie Gadusek (semifinals)
5. (United States) Pam Casale (second round)
6. (United States) JoAnne Russell (second round)
7. (Czechoslovakia) Helena Suková (final)
8. (South Korea) Lee Duk-hee (quarterfinals)
9. (France) Catherine Tanvier (third round)
10. (Argentina) Ivanna Madruga-Osses (third round)
11. (Australia) Dianne Fromholtz (quarterfinals)
12. (United States) Lisa Bonder-Kreiss (third round)
13. (United States) Susan Mascarin (quarterfinals)
14. (United States) Leigh-Anne Thompson (second round)

== Draw ==
=== Key ===
- Q = Qualifier
- WC = Wild card
- LL = Lucky loser
- Alt = Alternate
- SE = Special exempt
- PR = Protected ranking
- ITF = ITF entry
- JE = Junior exempt
- w/o = Walkover
- r = Retired
- d = Defaulted
- SR = Special ranking

=== Finals ===
Quarterfinals
1 | **(Romania) Virginia Ruzici** | **7** | **6**
(United States) Michelle Torres | 5 | 2
4 | **(United States) Bonnie Gadusek** | **6** | **6**
8 | (South Korea) Lee Duk-hee | 2 | 0
7 | **(Czechoslovakia) Helena Suková** | **6** | **6**
11 | (Australia) Dianne Fromholtz | 1 | 3
13 | (United States) Susan Mascarin | 4 | **6** | 4
2 | **(United States) Kathy Rinaldi** | **6** | 1 | **6**

Semifinals
1 | **(Romania) Virginia Ruzici** | **6** | **6**
4 | (United States) Bonnie Gadusek | 2 | 0
7 | **(Czechoslovakia) Helena Suková** | **7** | 4 | **6**
2 | (United States) Kathy Rinaldi | 5 | **6** | 4

Final
1 | **(Romania) Virginia Ruzici** | **6** | **6**
7 | (Czechoslovakia) Helena Suková | 2 | 0

=== Top half ===
==== Section 1 ====
First round
**(South Africa) S Rollinson** | **6** | **6**
(United States) F Raschiatore | 1 | 1
**(South Africa) J Mundel** | **6** | **6**
(United States) A-M Fernandez | 3 | 3
(United States) L Doherty | 2 | 4
10 | **(Argentina) I Madruga-Osses** | **6** | **6**
(United States) S Acker | **6** | 2 | 4
Q | **(United States) M Bladel** | 3 | **6** | **6**
**(United States) M Torres** | **6** | **6**
Q | (Argentina) A Villagrán | 3 | 1
**(Peru) P Vásquez** | **6** | **6**
(United States) L Forood | 4 | 2

Second round
1 | **(Romania) V Ruzici** | 3 | **6** | **6**
(South Africa) S Rollinson | **6** | 4 | 1
(South Africa) J Mundel | 1 | 0
10 | **(Argentina) I Madruga-Osses** | **6** | **6**
Q | (United States) M Bladel | 1 | 2
**(United States) M Torres** | **6** | **6**
**(Peru) P Vásquez** | 0 | **6** | **6**
5 | (United States) P Casale | **6** | 1 | 0

Third round
1 | **(Romania) V Ruzici** | **6** | **6**
10 | (Argentina) I Madruga-Osses | 4 | 2
**(United States) M Torres** | **6** | **6**
(Peru) P Vásquez | 2 | 3

Quarterfinals
1 | **(Romania) V Ruzici** | **7** | **6**
(United States) M Torres | 5 | 2

==== Section 2 ====
First round
**(United States) K Henry** | **6** | 1 | **6**
Q | (Argentina) L Giussani | 3 | **6** | 4
**(United States) V Nelson** | **6** | **6**
Q | (Chile) G Ohaco | 3 | 1
(Hungary) M Pinterová | 0 | **6** | 1
14 | **(United States) L-A Thompson** | **6** | 1 | **6**
12 | **(United States) L Bonder-Kreiss** | **7** | **6**
(United States) P Smith | 6 | 2
(Czechoslovakia) I Budařová | 3 | 4
**(United States) A Henricksson** | **6** | **6**
(Sweden) C Lindqvist | **6** | 3 | 1
Q | **(Italy) P Murgo** | 3 | **6** | **6**

Second round
4 | **(United States) B Gadusek** | **6** | **6**
(United States) K Henry | 1 | 2
**(United States) V Nelson** | **6** | 1 | **6**
14 | (United States) L-A Thompson | 2 | **6** | 4
12 | **(United States) L Bonder-Kreiss** | **6** | **6**
(United States) A Henricksson | 2 | 2
Q | (Italy) P Murgo | 0 | 0
8 | **(South Korea) Lee D-h** | **6** | **6**

Third round
4 | **(United States) B Gadusek** | **6** | **6**
(United States) V Nelson | 4 | 2
12 | (United States) L Bonder-Kreiss | 4 | 1
8 | **(South Korea) Lee D-h** | **6** | **6**

Quarterfinals
4 | **(United States) B Gadusek** | **6** | **6**
8 | (South Korea) Lee D-h | 2 | 0

=== Bottom half ===
==== Section 3 ====
First round
**(United States) K Cummings** | **6** | **6**
(Italy) B Rossi | 3 | 1
Q | (United States) Shelby Torrance | 2 | 2
**(United States) J Klitch** | **6** | **6**
Q | (France) F Thibault | 1 | **6** | 2
**(United States) H Crowe** | **6** | 2 | **6**
11 | **(Australia) D Fromholtz** | 3 | **6** | **6**
(Czechoslovakia) M Pazderová | **6** | 1 | 0
**(Czechoslovakia) R Tomanová** | 3 | **6** | **6**
(United States) B Herr | **6** | 4 | 3
**(United States) D Gilbert** | **6** | **6**
(United States) K Steinmetz | 2 | 2

Second round
7 | **(Czechoslovakia) H Suková** | **6** | **6**
(United States) K Cummings | 3 | 1
**(United States) J Klitch** | **6** | **6**
(United States) H Crowe | 3 | 3
11 | **(Australia) D Fromholtz** | **7** | **4**
(Czechoslovakia) R Tomanová | 5 | 1^{r}
**(United States) D Gilbert** | 4 | **7** | **6**
3 | (United States) Z Garrison | **6** | 6 | 1

Third round
7 | **(Czechoslovakia) H Suková** | **6** | **6**
(United States) J Klitch | 1 | 3
11 | **(Australia) D Fromholtz** | 1 | **6** | **6**
(United States) D Gilbert | **6** | 3 | 4

Quarterfinals
7 | **(Czechoslovakia) H Suková** | **6** | **6**
11 | (Australia) D Fromholtz | 1 | 3

==== Section 4 ====
First round
**(France) C Vanier** | **6** | 4 | **6**
(United States) N Neviaser | 3 | **6** | 4
Q | **(United States) B Bramblett** | **6** | **6**
(United States) L Allen | 3 | 3
(United States) B Norton | 1 | **6** | 3
13 | **(United States) S Mascarin** | **6** | 3 | **6**
9 | **(France) C Tanvier** | **6** | 5 | **6**
(Czechoslovakia) M Skuherská | 0 | **7** | 1
(United States) L duPont | 2 | **6** | 1
**(Peru) L Arraya** | **6** | 4 | **6**
(Switzerland) H Strachoňová | 0 | 0^{r}
**(United States) E Burgin** | **6** | **3**

Second round
6 | (United States) J Russell | 2 | **6** | 2
**(France) C Vanier** | **6** | 2 | **6**
Q | (United States) B Bramblett | 4 | 4
13 | **(United States) S Mascarin** | **6** | **6**
9 | **(France) C Tanvier** | **6** | **6**
(Peru) L Arraya | 1 | 1
(United States) E Burgin | 1 | 4
2 | **(United States) K Rinaldi** | **6** | **6**

Third round
(France) C Vanier | 0 | 6
13 | **(United States) S Mascarin** | **6** | **7**
9 | (France) C Tanvier | 4 | 0
2 | **(United States) K Rinaldi** | **6** | **6**

Quarterfinals
13 | (United States) S Mascarin | 4 | **6** | 4
2 | **(United States) K Rinaldi** | **6** | 1 | **6**
