= 1982 U.S. Clay Court Championships – Men's singles =

Men's singles
- 1982 U.S. Clay Court Championships

Final
- Champion: (Spain) José Higueras
- Runner-up: (United States) Jimmy Arias
- Score: 7–5, 5–7, 6–3

Details
- Draw: 56
- Seeds: 16

Events
Singles	men	women
Doubles	men	women
- U.S. Clay Court Championships

José Luis Clerc was the defending champion, but lost to José Higueras in the semifinals. Fifth seed Higueras defeated Jimmy Arias in the final to claim the title and first prize money of $32,000.

== Seeds ==
A champion seed is indicated in bold text while text in italics indicates the round in which that seed was eliminated.

1. (Argentina) Guillermo Vilas (second round)
2. (Argentina) José Luis Clerc (semifinals)
3. (Sweden) Mats Wilander (third round)
4. (Australia) Peter McNamara (second round)
5. (Spain) **José Higueras (champion)**
6. (Ecuador) Andrés Gómez (quarterfinals)
7. (United States) Mel Purcell (quarterfinals)
8. (Hungary) Balázs Taróczy (second round)
9. (Australia) John Alexander (first round)
10. (United States) Jimmy Arias (final)
11. (United States) Van Winitsky (first round)
12. (Peru) Pablo Arraya (quarterfinals)
13. (Australia) Kim Warwick (first round)
14. (Chile) Hans Gildemeister (quarterfinals)
15. (India) Ramesh Krishnan (second round)
16. (Spain) Fernando Luna (first round)

== Draw ==
Key

- Q = Qualifier
- WC = Wild card
- LL = Lucky loser
- Alt = Alternate
- ITF = ITF entry
- PR = Protected ranking
- SR = Special ranking
- SE = Special exempt
- JE = Junior exempt
- JR = Junior Accelerator Programme entrant
- CO = College Accelerator Programme entrant
- NG = Next Gen Accelerator Program entrant
- w/o = Walkover
- r = Retired
- d = Defaulted

=== Finals ===
Quarterfinals
**(Sweden) Hans Simonsson**	**7**	**6**
6	(Ecuador) Andrés Gómez	5	4
10	**(United States) Jimmy Arias**	**6**	**6**
14	(Chile) Hans Gildemeister	4	3
5	**(Spain) José Higueras**	**6**	**6**
12	(Peru) Pablo Arraya	4	0
7	(United States) Mel Purcell	**6**	4	4
2	**(Argentina) José Luis Clerc**	4	**6**	**6**

Semifinals
(Sweden) Hans Simonsson	6	**6**	0
10	**(United States) Jimmy Arias**	**7**	2	**6**
5	**(Spain) José Higueras**	**6**	**6**
2	(Argentina) José Luis Clerc	3	3

Final
10	(United States) Jimmy Arias	5	**7**	3
5	**(Spain) José Higueras**	**7**	5	**6**

=== Top half ===
==== Section 1 ====
First round
1	**(Argentina) G Vilas**	**6**	**6**
(United States) J Levine	3	2
**(Sweden) H Simonsson**	**6**	6	**6**
Q	(United States) B Csipkay	0	**7**	1
**(Australia) CA Miller**	**7**	2
(Uruguay) D Pérez	5	4^{r}
**(United States) M Cahill**	**6**	2	**8**
16	(Spain) F Luna	1	**6**	6
11	(United States) V Winitsky	3	0
**(South Africa) F Sauer**	**6**	**6**
Q	**(Spain) J Aguilera**	3	**7**	**6**
Q	(Colombia) A Cortes	**6**	5	1
(United States) R Fagel	1	0
**(France) T Tulasne**	**6**	**6**
(United States) T Wilkison	5	2
6	**(Ecuador) A Gómez**	**7**	**6**

Second round
1	(Argentina) G Vilas	4	1
**(Sweden) H Simonsson**	**6**	**6**
(Australia) CA Miller	2	4
**(United States) M Cahill**	**6**	**6**
(South Africa) F Sauer	**6**	2	1
Q	**(Spain) J Aguilera**	3	**6**	**6**
(France) T Tulasne	4	4
6	**(Ecuador) A Gómez**	**6**	**6**

Third round
**(Sweden) H Simonsson**	2	**6**	**6**
(United States) M Cahill	**6**	2	4
Q	(Spain) J Aguilera	3	5
6	**(Ecuador) A Gómez**	**6**	**7**

Quarterfinals
**(Sweden) H Simonsson**	**7**	**6**
6	(Ecuador) A Gómez	5	4

==== Section 2 ====
First round
4	**(Australia) P McNamara**	**6**	4	**6**
(France) G Goven	3	**6**	1
**(Spain) Á Giménez**	**7**	**6**
(Brazil) C Kirmayr	6	2
**(Australia) B Drewett**	**6**	**6**
(Argentina) A Gattiker	3	2
(Spain) S Casal	6	3
10	**(United States) J Arias**	**7**	**6**
14	**(Chile) H Gildemeister**	**7**	**6**
Q	(United Kingdom) C Dowdeswell	6	2
Q	(United States) C Wittus	2	4
**(Paraguay) V Pecci**	**6**	**6**
**(Sweden) J Nyström**	**6**	**6**
(Czechoslovakia) J Granát	4	1
(United States) T Moor	**6**	4	1
8	**(Hungary) B Taróczy**	1	**6**	**6**

Second round
4	(Australia) P McNamara	5	3
**(Spain) Á Giménez**	**7**	**6**
(Australia) B Drewett	4	4
10	**(United States) J Arias**	**6**	**6**
14	**(Chile) H Gildemeister**	**6**	6	**6**
(Paraguay) V Pecci	3	**7**	2
**(Sweden) J Nyström**	6	**6**	**6**
8	(Hungary) B Taróczy	**7**	3	0

Third round
(Spain) Á Giménez	4	4
10	**(United States) J Arias**	**6**	**6**
14	**(Chile) H Gildemeister**	**6**	**6**
(Sweden) J Nyström	4	1

Quarterfinals
10	**(United States) J Arias**	**6**	**6**
14	(Chile) H Gildemeister	4	3

=== Bottom half ===
==== Section 3 ====
First round
5	**(Spain) J Higueras**	**7**	3	**6**
(Italy) C Panatta	5	**6**	1
**(West Germany) R Gehring**	**6**	**6**
Q	(United States) C Edwards	3	3
(Chile) R Acuña	2	2
**(France) G Moretton**	**6**	**6**
**(Bolivia) M Martinez**	**6**	**6**
13	(Australia) K Warwick	3	2
12	**(Peru) P Arraya**	**6**	**6**
(United States) S Krulevitz	3	3
(Argentina) A Ganzábal	**6**	4	3
**(United States) J Gurfein**	4	**6**	**6**
Q	(Sweden) T Högstedt	2	**7**	3
**(Uruguay) JL Damiani**	**6**	6	**6**
(Sweden) S Simonsson	3	3
3	**(Sweden) M Wilander**	**6**	**6**

Second round
5	**(Spain) J Higueras**	**6**	**6**
(West Germany) R Gehring	2	2
**(France) G Moretton**	3	**7**	**7**
(Bolivia) M Martinez	**6**	6	5
12	**(Peru) P Arraya**	3	**6**	**6**
(United States) J Gurfein	**6**	1	1
(Uruguay) JL Damiani	1	4
3	**(Sweden) M Wilander**	**6**	**6**

Third round
5	**(Spain) J Higueras**	**6**	**6**
(France) G Moretton	3	3
12	**(Peru) P Arraya**	**7**	**7**
3	(Sweden) M Wilander	6	6

Quarterfinals
5	**(Spain) J Higueras**	**6**	**6**
12	(Peru) P Arraya	4	0

==== Section 4 ====
First round
7	**(United States) M Purcell**	**7**	**6**
(Czechoslovakia) S Birner	5	4
(United States) P Murphy	2	1
**(United States) E Fromm**	**6**	**6**
(Socialist Federal Republic of Yugoslavia) M Ostoja	3	**7**	2
**(United States) J Brown**	**6**	6	**6**
(Spain) J López-Maeso	**6**	3	2
15	**(India) R Krishnan**	4	**6**	**6**
9	(Australia) J Alexander	4	4
**(France) G Forget**	**6**	**6**
Q	**(United States) J Hayes**	**6**	**6**
(United States) T Witsken	3	1
(Spain) J Avendaño	1	4
**(Sweden) A Järryd**	**6**	**6**
(France) J Potier	4	1
2	**(Argentina) JL Clerc**	**6**	**6**

Second round
7	**(United States) M Purcell**	**7**	**7**
(United States) E Fromm	5	5
**(United States) J Brown**	**6**	**6**
15	(India) R Krishnan	2	1
**(France) G Forget**	**6**	**6**
Q	(United States) J Hayes	3	1
(Sweden) A Järryd	2	2
2	**(Argentina) JL Clerc**	**6**	**6**

Third round
7	**(United States) M Purcell**	**6**	**6**
(United States) J Brown	3	4
(France) G Forget	**7**	3	3
2	**(Argentina) JL Clerc**	6	**6**	**6**

Quarterfinals
7	(United States) M Purcell	**6**	4	4
2	**(Argentina) JL Clerc**	4	**6**	**6**
