= 1989 Swatch Open =

- Date: 17–23 April
- Edition: 18th
- Category: Grand Prix
- Draw: 32S / 16D
- Prize money: $140,000
- Surface: Clay / outdoor
- Location: Nice, France
- Venue: Nice Lawn Tennis Club

Champions

Singles
- (Soviet Union) Andrei Chesnokov

Doubles
- (West Germany) Ricki Osterthun / (West Germany) Udo Riglewski
- Open de Nice Côte d'Azur

The 1989 Swatch Open, also known as the Nice Open, was a men's tennis tournament played on outdoor clay courts at the Nice Lawn Tennis Club in Nice, France, and was part of the 1989 Nabisco Grand Prix. It was the 18th edition of the tournament and took place from 17 April through 23 April 1989. Sixth-seeded Andrei Chesnokov won the singles title.

== Finals ==
=== Singles ===
(Soviet Union) Andrei Chesnokov defeated (France) Jérôme Potier 6–4, 6–4

- It was Chesnokov's 1st title of the year and the 3rd of his career.

=== Doubles ===
(West Germany) Ricki Osterthun / (West Germany) Udo Riglewski defeated (Switzerland) Heinz Günthardt / (Hungary) Balázs Taróczy 7–6, 6–7, 6–1

- It was Osterthun's only title of the year and the 4th of his career. It was Riglewski's 2nd title of the year and the 4th of his career.
