= 1983 U.S. Clay Court Championships =

- Date: July 31 – August 7
- Edition: 15th
- Draw: 56S/28D (men); 56S/32D (women)
- Prize money: $300,000 (men) $289,000 (women)
- Surface: Clay / outdoor
- Location: Indianapolis, Indiana, US

Champions

Men's singles
- (United States) Jimmy Arias

Women's singles
- (Hungary) Andrea Temesvári

Men's doubles
- (Australia) Mark Edmondson / (United States) Sherwood Stewart

Women's doubles
- (United States) Kathleen Horvath / (Romania) Virginia Ruzici
← 1982 ·	U.S. Clay Court Championships	· 1984 →

The 1983 U.S. Clay Court Championships (also known as the 1983 U.S. Open Clay Courts) was a men's Grand Prix and women's Championship Series tennis tournament played on outdoor clay courts in Indianapolis in the United States. It was the 15th edition of the tournament and was held from July 31 through August 7, 1983. Jimmy Arias and Andrea Temesvári won the singles titles.

== Finals ==
=== Men's singles ===
(United States) Jimmy Arias defeated (Ecuador) Andrés Gómez 6–4, 2–6, 6–4

- It was Arias' 3rd title of the year and the 4th of his career.

=== Women's singles ===
(Hungary) Andrea Temesvári defeated (United States) Zina Garrison 6–2, 6–2

- It was Temesvári's 3rd title of the year and her career.

=== Men's doubles ===
(Australia) Mark Edmondson / (United States) Sherwood Stewart defeated (Brazil) Carlos Kirmayr / (Brazil) Cássio Motta 6–3, 6–2

- It was Edmondson's 2nd title of the year and the 24th of his career. It was Stewart's 3rd title of the year and the 45th of his career.

=== Women's doubles ===
(United States) Kathleen Horvath / (Romania) Virginia Ruzici defeated (United States) Gigi Fernández / (United States) Beth Herr 7–5, 6–4

- It was Horvath's 2nd title of the year and the 3rd of her career. It was Ruzici's 2nd title of the year and the 23rd of her career.
