= 1983 U.S. Clay Court Championships – Women's doubles =

Women's doubles
- 1983 U.S. Clay Court Championships

Final
- Champions: (United States) Kathy Horvath (Romania) Virginia Ruzici
- Runners-up: (United States) Gigi Fernández (United States) Beth Herr
- Score: 4–6, 7–6, 6–2

Events
Singles	men	women
Doubles	men	women
← 1982 ·	U.S. Clay Court Championships	· 1984 →

Top-seeded pair Kathy Horvath and Virginia Ruzici claimed the title by defeating Gigi Fernández and Beth Herr in the final.

== Seeds ==
A champion seed is indicated in bold text while text in italics indicates the round in which that seed was eliminated.

1. (United States) **Kathy Horvath / (Romania) Virginia Ruzici (champions)**
2. (Australia) Dianne Fromholtz / (Argentina) Ivanna Madruga (quarterfinals)
3. (United States) Elise Burgin / (United States) JoAnne Russell (semifinals)
4. (United States) Bonnie Gadusek / (Czechoslovakia) Helena Suková (quarterfinals)
5. (Czechoslovakia) Iva Budařová / (Czechoslovakia) Marcela Skuherská (quarterfinals)
6. (United States) Sandy Collins / (United States) Zina Garrison (quarterfinals)
7. (United States) Camille Benjamin / (Socialist Federal Republic of Yugoslavia) Mima Jaušovec (semifinals)
8. (Brazil) Patricia Medrado / (Czechoslovakia) Kateřina Skronská (first round)

== Draw ==
=== Key ===
- Q = Qualifier
- WC = Wild card
- LL = Lucky loser
- Alt = Alternate
- SE = Special exempt
- PR = Protected ranking
- ITF = ITF entry
- JE = Junior exempt
- w/o = Walkover
- r = Retired
- d = Defaulted
- SR = Special ranking

=== Finals ===
Semifinals
1	**(United States) Kathy Horvath** **(Romania) Virginia Ruzici**	**6**	3	**6**
7	(United States) Camille Benjamin (Socialist Federal Republic of Yugoslavia) Mima Jaušovec	1	**6**	2
3	(United States) Elise Burgin (United States) JoAnne Russell	3	2
**(United States) Gigi Fernández** **(United States) Beth Herr**	**6**	**6**

Final
1	**(United States) Kathy Horvath** **(Romania) Virginia Ruzici**	4	**7**	**6**
(United States) Gigi Fernández (United States) Beth Herr	**6**	6	2

=== Top half ===
First round
1	**(United States) K Horvath** **(Romania) V Ruzici**	**6**	**6**
(United States) A Henricksson (Jamaica) J Van Ryck de Groot	1	2
**(United States) B Bruning** **(United States) B Buckley**	**6**	2	**7**
(United States) G Purdy (United States) M Torres	2	**6**	5
**(Socialist Federal Republic of Yugoslavia) S Goleš** **(Socialist Federal Republic of Yugoslavia) R Šašak**	**6**	2	**6**
(United Kingdom) A Croft (United States) J Klitch	4	**6**	3
(Peru) L Arraya (Argentina) E Raponi-Longo	**7**	5	1
6	**(United States) S Collins** **(United States) Z Garrison**	5	**7**	**6**
4	**(United States) B Gadusek** **(Czechoslovakia) H Suková**	**6**	**6**
(South Korea) Lee D-h (Romania) L Romanov	2	2
**(Australia) N Gregory** **(United States) K Sands**	**6**	**7**
(Czechoslovakia) Y Brzáková (Australia) A Minter	4	6
(France) S Amiach (Chile) G Ohaco	1	3
**(United States) H Crowe** **(United States) K Steinmetz**	**6**	**6**
(Spain) C Perea (Peru) P Vásquez	6	4
7	**(United States) C Benjamin** **(Socialist Federal Republic of Yugoslavia) M Jaušovec**	**7**	**6**

Second round
1	**(United States) K Horvath** **(Romania) V Ruzici**	**6**	**6**
(United States) B Bruning (United States) B Buckley	1	2
(Socialist Federal Republic of Yugoslavia) S Goleš (Socialist Federal Republic of Yugoslavia) R Šašak	**6**	3	1
6	**(United States) S Collins** **(United States) Z Garrison**	4	**6**	**6**
4	**(United States) B Gadusek** **(Czechoslovakia) H Suková**	**6**	**6**
(Australia) N Gregory (United States) K Sands	2	1
(United States) H Crowe (United States) K Steinmetz	4	4
7	**(United States) C Benjamin** **(Socialist Federal Republic of Yugoslavia) M Jaušovec**	**6**	**6**

Quarterfinals
1	**(United States) K Horvath** **(Romania) V Ruzici**	**7**	0	**6**
6	(United States) S Collins (United States) Z Garrison	6	**6**	3
4	(United States) B Gadusek (Czechoslovakia) H Suková	4	0
7	**(United States) C Benjamin** **(Socialist Federal Republic of Yugoslavia) M Jaušovec**	**6**	**6**

Semifinals
1	**(United States) K Horvath** **(Romania) V Ruzici**	**6**	3	**6**
7	(United States) C Benjamin (Socialist Federal Republic of Yugoslavia) M Jaušovec	1	**6**	2

=== Bottom half ===
First round
5	**(Czechoslovakia) I Budařová** **(Czechoslovakia) M Skuherská**	**6**	**6**
(United States) B Bramblett (United Kingdom) R Einy	1	1
(United States) T Mochizuki (United States) F Raschiatore	**6**	1	4
**(United States) A Holton** **(United States) K Holton**	2	**6**	**6**
(New Zealand) C Newton (Australia) P Whytcross	5	3
**(United States) L Allen** **(United States) G Rush**	**7**	**6**
(United States) D Gilbert (Hong Kong) P Hy	2	3
3	**(United States) E Burgin** **(United States) J Russell**	**6**	**6**
8	(Brazil) P Medrado (Czechoslovakia) K Skronská
**(Bulgaria) M Maleeva** **(Italy) S Simmonds**
(United States) P Casale (Italy) R Reggi	1	2
**(United States) G Fernández** **(United States) B Herr**	**6**	**6**
**(United States) S Foltz** **(United States) T Phelps**	2	**6**	**6**
(United States) J Golder (United States) S Solomon	**6**	3	3
(Japan) E Inoue (United States) V Nelson	3	2
2	**(Australia) D Fromholtz** **(Argentina) I Madruga**	**6**	**6**

Second round
5	**(Czechoslovakia) I Budařová** **(Czechoslovakia) M Skuherská**	4	**6**	**6**
(United States) A Holton (United States) K Holton	**6**	4	2
(United States) L Allen (United States) G Rush	**7**	5	4
3	**(United States) E Burgin** **(United States) J Russell**	6	**7**	**6**
(Bulgaria) M Maleeva (Italy) S Simmonds	6	3
**(United States) G Fernández** **(United States) B Herr**	**7**	**6**
(United States) S Foltz (United States) T Phelps	1	4
2	**(Australia) D Fromholtz** **(Argentina) I Madruga**	**6**	**6**

Quarterfinals
5	(Czechoslovakia) I Budařová (Czechoslovakia) M Skuherská	2	2
3	**(United States) E Burgin** **(United States) J Russell**	**6**	**6**
**(United States) G Fernández** **(United States) B Herr**	**6**	**6**
2	(Australia) D Fromholtz (Argentina) I Madruga	4	3

Semifinals
3	(United States) E Burgin (United States) J Russell	3	2
**(United States) G Fernández** **(United States) B Herr**	**6**	**6**
