= 1990 Philips Open – Doubles =

Doubles
- 1990 Philips Open

Final
- Champions: (Argentina) Alberto Mancini (France) Yannick Noah
- Runners-up: (Uruguay) Marcelo Filippini (Austria) Horst Skoff
- Score: 6–4, 7–6

Details
- Draw: 15
- Seeds: 4

Events
Singles	Doubles
- Open de Nice Côte d'Azur

Ricki Osterthun and Udo Riglewski were the defending champions, but Osterthun did not compete this year. Riglewski teamed up with Michael Stich and lost in the first round to Fabrice Santoro and Thierry Tulasne.

Alberto Mancini and Yannick Noah won the title by defeating Marcelo Filippini and Horst Skoff 6–4, 7–6 in the final.

== Seeds ==
1. (France) Guy Forget / (Switzerland) Jakob Hlasek (first round)
2. (Czechoslovakia) Petr Korda / (Czechoslovakia) Tomáš Šmíd (first round)
3. (Denmark) Michael Mortensen / (Spain) Javier Sánchez (quarterfinals)
4. (Iran) Mansour Bahrami / (France) Éric Winogradsky (quarterfinals)

== Draw ==
Key

- Q = Qualifier
- WC = Wild card
- LL = Lucky loser
- Alt = Alternate
- ITF = ITF entry
- PR = Protected ranking
- SR = Special ranking
- SE = Special exempt
- JE = Junior exempt
- JR = Junior Accelerator Programme entrant
- CO = College Accelerator Programme entrant
- NG = Next Gen Accelerator Program entrant
- w/o = Walkover
- r = Retired
- d = Defaulted

=== Draw ===
First round
1	(France) G Forget (Switzerland) J Hlasek	5	1
(Spain) F Clavet (Sweden) N Utgren	7	6
(United States) C Beckman (United States) L Jensen	2	6
(Uruguay) M Filippini (Austria) H Skoff	6	7
3	(Denmark) M Mortensen (Spain) J Sánchez	2	7	6
(Peru) C di Laura (Argentina) G Luza	6	5	3
(West Germany) B Becker (Sweden) J Gunnarsson	6	3	6
(Spain) J Arrese (Spain) T Carbonell	2	6	4
(United States) P Galbraith (Australia) D Macpherson	4	4
4	(Iran) M Bahrami (France) É Winogradsky	6	6
(France) F Santoro (France) T Tulasne	7	6
(West Germany) U Riglewski (West Germany) M Stich	6	4
(Argentina) A Mancini (France) Y Noah	3	6	6
2	(Czechoslovakia) P Korda (Czechoslovakia) T Šmíd	6	3	2

Quarterfinals
(Spain) F Clavet (Sweden) N Utgren	6	2
(Uruguay) M Filippini (Austria) H Skoff	7	6
3	(Denmark) M Mortensen (Spain) J Sánchez	7	3	3
(West Germany) B Becker (Sweden) J Gunnarsson	6	6	6
(Switzerland) M Rosset (Romania) F Segărceanu	6	7
4	(Iran) M Bahrami (France) É Winogradsky	1	5
(France) F Santoro (France) T Tulasne	1	6
(Argentina) A Mancini (France) Y Noah	6	7

Semifinals
(Uruguay) M Filippini (Austria) H Skoff	6	7
(West Germany) B Becker (Sweden) J Gunnarsson	4	5
(Switzerland) M Rosset (Romania) F Segărceanu
(Argentina) A Mancini (France) Y Noah	w/o

Final
(Uruguay) M Filippini (Austria) H Skoff	4	6
(Argentina) A Mancini (France) Y Noah	6	7
