= 1983 U.S. Clay Court Championships – Men's doubles =

Men's doubles
- 1983 U.S. Clay Court Championships

Final
- Champions: (Australia) Mark Edmondson (United States) Sherwood Stewart
- Runners-up: (Brazil) Carlos Kirmayr (Brazil) Cássio Motta
- Score: 6–3, 6–2

Details
- Draw: 28
- Seeds: 8

Events
Singles	men	women
Doubles	men	women
- U.S. Clay Court Championships

Second-seeded pair Mark Edmondson and Sherwood Stewart won the title, sharing $18,000 prize money after beating Carlos Kirmayr and Cássio Motta in the final.

== Seeds ==
The top four seeds received a bye into the second round. A champion seed is indicated in bold text while text in italics indicates the round in which that seed was eliminated.

1. (United States) Tim Gullikson / (United States) Tom Gullikson (semifinals)
2. (Australia) **Mark Edmondson / (United States) Sherwood Stewart (champions)**
3. (Australia) Paul McNamee / (United States) Ferdi Taygan (semifinals)
4. (Brazil) Carlos Kirmayr / (Brazil) Cássio Motta (final)
5. (United States) Mark Dickson / (Sweden) Jan Gunnarsson (first round)
6. (New Zealand) Chris Lewis / (Sweden) Hans Simonsson (first round)
7. (Israel) Shlomo Glickstein / (United States) Van Winitsky (quarterfinals)
8. (Australia) Broderick Dyke / (Chile) Belus Prajoux (first round)

== Draw ==
Key

- Q = Qualifier
- WC = Wild card
- LL = Lucky loser
- Alt = Alternate
- ITF = ITF entry
- PR = Protected ranking
- SR = Special ranking
- SE = Special exempt
- JE = Junior exempt
- JR = Junior Accelerator Programme entrant
- CO = College Accelerator Programme entrant
- NG = Next Gen Accelerator Program entrant
- w/o = Walkover
- r = Retired
- d = Defaulted

=== Finals ===
Semifinals
1	(United States) Tim Gullikson (United States) Tom Gullikson	3	**6**	2
4	**(Brazil) Carlos Kirmayr** **(Brazil) Cássio Motta**	**6**	1	**6**
3	(Australia) Paul McNamee (United States) Ferdi Taygan	**7**	2	0
2	**(Australia) Mark Edmondson** **(United States) Sherwood Stewart**	6	**6**	**6**

Final
4	(Brazil) Carlos Kirmayr (Brazil) Cássio Motta	3	2
2	**(Australia) Mark Edmondson** **(United States) Sherwood Stewart**	**6**	**6**

=== Top half ===
First round
**(Peru) P Arraya** **(Czechoslovakia) L Pimek**	**7**	2	**6**
(Australia) D Graham (Australia) L Warder	6	**6**	3
**(United States) S Krulevitz** **(South Africa) D Tarr**	**6**	**7**
(Australia) J Alexander (Australia) B Drewett	4	5
**(United States) R Seguso** **(United States) C Strode**	**7**	4	**6**
6	(New Zealand) C Lewis (Sweden) H Simonsson	6	**6**	2
**(Uruguay) JL Damiani** **(Uruguay) D Pérez**	**6**	**6**
(United Kingdom) C Dowdeswell (Hungary) Z Kuhárszky	4	3
**(United States) M Brunnberg** **(Italy) C Panatta**	6	**6**	**6**
(South Africa) M Myburg (Finland) L Palin	**7**	3	4
**(Czechoslovakia) S Birner** **(Australia) CA Miller**	3	**6**	**10**
8	(Australia) B Dyke (Chile) B Prajoux	**6**	2	8

Second round
1	**(United States) Ti Gullikson** **(United States) To Gullikson**	**6**	3	**6**
(Peru) P Arraya (Czechoslovakia) L Pimek	4	**6**	1
(United States) S Krulevitz (South Africa) D Tarr	2	6
**(United States) R Seguso** **(United States) C Strode**	**6**	**7**
4	**(Brazil) C Kirmayr** **(Brazil) C Motta**	**7**	**6**
(Uruguay) JL Damiani (Uruguay) D Pérez	6	4
(United States) M Brunnberg (Italy) C Panatta	**6**	6	7
**(Czechoslovakia) S Birner** **(Australia) CA Miller**	2	**7**	**9**

Quarterfinals
1	**(United States) Ti Gullikson** **(United States) To Gullikson**	**6**	**6**
(United States) R Seguso (United States) C Strode	2	3
4	**(Brazil) C Kirmayr** **(Brazil) C Motta**	4	**6**	**6**
(Czechoslovakia) S Birner (Australia) CA Miller	**6**	3	4

Semifinals
1	(United States) Ti Gullikson (United States) To Gullikson	3	**6**	2
4	**(Brazil) C Kirmayr** **(Brazil) C Motta**	**6**	1	**6**

=== Bottom half ===
First round
5	(United States) M Dickson (Sweden) J Gunnarsson	2	5
**(South Africa) R Venter** **(United States) B Willenborg**	**6**	**7**
**(United States) G Donnelly** **(United States) R Hightower**	**6**	6	**11**
(United States) G Holmes (United States) J Letts	2	**7**	9
**(Australia) D Cahill** **(United States) T Moor**	**6**	**6**
(Australia) C Johnstone (Australia) J McCurdy	3	4
7	**(Israel) S Glickstein** **(United States) V Winitsky**	**6**	5	**6**
(United States) J Canter (Switzerland) J Hlasek	3	**7**	4
**(United States) K Flach** **(United States) J Van Nostrand**	6	**6**	**14**
(Ecuador) A Gómez (Ecuador) R Ycaza	**7**	3	12
**(United States) T Warneke** **(United States) T Witsken**	3	**6**	**6**
(Spain) L Fargas (Spain) G Urpí	**6**	3	2

Second round
(South Africa) R Venter (United States) B Willenborg	**6**	2	3
**(United States) G Donnelly** **(United States) R Hightower**	2	**6**	**6**
(Australia) D Cahill (United States) T Moor	6	3
3	**(Australia) P McNamee** **(United States) F Taygan**	**7**	**6**
7	**(Israel) S Glickstein** **(United States) V Winitsky**	**6**	**6**
(United States) K Flach (United States) J Van Nostrand	1	4
(United States) T Warneke (United States) T Witsken	3	3
2	**(Australia) M Edmondson** **(United States) S Stewart**	**6**	**6**

Quarterfinals
(United States) G Donnelly (United States) R Hightower	6	3
3	**(Australia) P McNamee** **(United States) F Taygan**	**7**	**6**
7	(Israel) S Glickstein (United States) V Winitsky	3	6
2	**(Australia) M Edmondson** **(United States) S Stewart**	**6**	**7**

Semifinals
3	(Australia) P McNamee (United States) F Taygan	**7**	2	0
2	**(Australia) M Edmondson** **(United States) S Stewart**	6	**6**	**6**
