= 1983 U.S. Clay Court Championships – Women's singles =

Women's singles
- 1983 U.S. Clay Court Championships

Final
- Champion: (Hungary) Andrea Temesvári
- Runner-up: (United States) Zina Garrison
- Score: 6–2, 6–2

Events
Singles	men	women
Doubles	men	women
← 1982 ·	U.S. Clay Court Championships	· 1984 →

Fourth-seeded Virginia Ruzici was the defending champion but went out in the semifinals to Andrea Temesvári. Top-seed Temesvári won the final and $34,000 first prize money by defeating Zina Garrison in the final.

== Seeds ==
The top eight seeds received a bye into the second round. A champion seed is indicated in bold text while text in italics indicates the round in which that seed was eliminated.

1. (Hungary) **Andrea Temesvári (champion)**
2. (United States) Kathy Rinaldi (semifinals)
3. (United States) Zina Garrison (final)
4. (Romania) Virginia Ruzici (semifinals)
5. (United States) Bonnie Gadusek (quarterfinals)
6. (Czechoslovakia) Helena Suková (second round)
7. (Canada) Carling Bassett (third round)
8. (United States) Kathy Horvath (quarterfinals)
9. (United States) Michelle Torres (first round)
10. (Czechoslovakia) Iva Budařová (third round)
11. (Socialist Federal Republic of Yugoslavia) Mima Jaušovec (third round)
12. (Argentina) Ivanna Madruga-Osses (quarterfinals)
13. (United States) Beth Herr (third round)
14. (Bulgaria) Manuela Maleeva (quarterfinals)

== Draw ==
=== Key ===
- Q = Qualifier
- WC = Wild card
- LL = Lucky loser
- Alt = Alternate
- SE = Special exempt
- PR = Protected ranking
- ITF = ITF entry
- JE = Junior exempt
- w/o = Walkover
- r = Retired
- d = Defaulted
- SR = Special ranking

=== Finals ===
Quarterfinals
1	**(Hungary) Andrea Temesvári**	**6**	**6**
8	(United States) Kathy Horvath	3	1
4	**(Romania) Virginia Ruzici**	**7**	**6**
5	(United States) Bonnie Gadusek	5	4
12	(Argentina) Ivanna Madruga-Osses	6	3
3	**(United States) Zina Garrison**	**7**	**6**
14	(Bulgaria) Manuela Maleeva	**7**	0	2
2	**(United States) Kathy Rinaldi**	6	**6**	**6**

Semifinals
1	**(Hungary) Andrea Temesvári**	**6**	**6**
4	(Romania) Virginia Ruzici	2	2
3	**(United States) Zina Garrison**	**6**	**6**
2	(United States) Kathy Rinaldi	1	4

Final
1	**(Hungary) Andrea Temesvári**	**6**	**6**
3	(United States) Zina Garrison	2	2

=== Top half ===
==== Section 1 ====
First round
Q	**(Peru) P Vásquez**	**6**	**7**
(United States) D Gilbert	3	5
**(United States) P Casale**	**6**	**6**
(United States) G Fernández	2	3
(United States) L Allen	2	1
11	**(Socialist Federal Republic of Yugoslavia) M Jaušovec**	**6**	**6**
9	(United States) M Torres	6	**7**	2
**(United States) B Bowes**	**7**	6	**6**
(United States) A Holton	4	1
**(United States) S Solomon**	**6**	**6**
**(United States) K Sands**	**6**	**6**
Q	(United Kingdom) R Einy	4	2

Second round
1	**(Hungary) A Temesvári**	**6**	**6**
Q	(Peru) P Vásquez	3	3
(United States) P Casale	3	3
11	**(Socialist Federal Republic of Yugoslavia) M Jaušovec**	**6**	**6**
(United States) B Bowes	2	**7**	4
**(United States) S Solomon**	**6**	6	**6**
(United States) K Sands	2	5
8	**(United States) K Horvath**	**6**	**7**

Third round
1	**(Hungary) A Temesvári**	**6**	**6**
11	(Socialist Federal Republic of Yugoslavia) M Jaušovec	0	1
(United States) S Solomon	5	0
8	**(United States) K Horvath**	**7**	**6**

Quarterfinals
1	**(Hungary) A Temesvári**	**6**	**6**
8	(United States) K Horvath	3	1

==== Section 2 ====
First round
(Brazil) P Medrado	2	4
**(Italy) R Reggi**	**6**	**6**
**(United States) G Purdy**	6	**6**	**6**
Q	(Socialist Federal Republic of Yugoslavia) R Šašak	**7**	2	4
(Socialist Federal Republic of Yugoslavia) S Goleš	6	2
13	**(United States) B Herr**	**7**	**6**
(United States) T Mochizuki	6	**6**	5
Q	**(United States) K Gompert**	**7**	3	**7**
(Italy) S Simmonds	**6**	4	1
Q	**(United States) B Gerken**	4	**6**	**6**
(United States) K Steinmetz	**6**	2	5
**(Czechoslovakia) K Skronská**	1	**6**	**7**

Second round
4	**(Romania) V Ruzici**	**6**	**6**
(Italy) R Reggi	2	4
(United States) G Purdy	1	1
13	**(United States) B Herr**	**6**	**6**
Q	**(United States) K Gompert**	**6**	**6**
Q	(United States) B Gerken	2	3
(Czechoslovakia) K Skronská	0	1
5	**(United States) B Gadusek**	**6**	**6**

Third round
4	**(Romania) V Ruzici**	6	**6**	**6**
13	(United States) B Herr	**7**	2	2
Q	(United States) K Gompert	6	2
5	**(United States) B Gadusek**	**7**	**6**

Quarterfinals
4	**(Romania) V Ruzici**	**7**	**6**
5	(United States) B Gadusek	5	4

=== Bottom half ===
==== Section 3 ====
First round
**(Argentina) E Longo**	**6**	**7**
(United States) A Henricksson	4	6
**(United States) G Rush**	**6**	2	**6**
Q	(Australia) B Randall	2	**6**	4
(South Korea) Lee D-h	3	3
12	**(Argentina) I Madruga-Osses**	**6**	**6**
(Hong Kong) P Hy	1	4
**(Australia) D Fromholtz**	**6**	**6**
(Romania) L Romanov	5	3
**(United States) S Foltz**	**7**	**6**
**(United States) B Bramblett**	**6**	6	**6**
(Peru) L Arraya	1	**7**	3

Second round
7	**(Canada) C Bassett**	**6**	**6**
(Argentina) E Longo	4	3
(United States) G Rush	0	0
12	**(Argentina) I Madruga-Osses**	**6**	**6**
**(Australia) D Fromholtz**	**6**	**6**
(United States) S Foltz	2	2
(United States) B Bramblett	4	4
3	**(United States) Z Garrison**	**6**	**6**

Third round
7	(Canada) C Bassett	4	1
12	**(Argentina) I Madruga-Osses**	**6**	**6**
(Australia) D Fromholtz	4	1
3	**(United States) Z Garrison**	**6**	**6**

Quarterfinals
12	(Argentina) I Madruga-Osses	6	3
3	**(United States) Z Garrison**	**7**	**6**

==== Section 4 ====
First round
**(United States) C Benjamin**	6	**6**	**6**
(Australia) A Minter	**7**	2	1
**(United States) E Burgin**	**6**	1	**6**
Q	(United States) F Raschiatore	2	**6**	3
(United States) V Nelson	0	4
14	**(Bulgaria) M Maleeva**	**6**	**6**
10	**(Czechoslovakia) I Budařová**	**7**	**6**
(United States) T Phelps	5	4
**(United States) J Russell**	6	**6**	**6**
(Japan) E Inoue	**7**	2	0
(United States) J Klitch	3	3
Q	**(United Kingdom) A Croft**	**6**	**6**

Second round
6	(Czechoslovakia) H Suková	6	**6**	1
**(United States) C Benjamin**	**7**	4	**6**
(United States) E Burgin	3	3
14	**(Bulgaria) M Maleeva**	**6**	**6**
10	**(Czechoslovakia) I Budařová**	**7**	**6**
(United States) J Russell	5	3
Q	(United Kingdom) A Croft	**7**	3	3
2	**(United States) K Rinaldi**	5	**6**	**6**

Third round
(United States) C Benjamin	1	**6**	3
14	**(Bulgaria) M Maleeva**	**6**	2	**6**
10	(Czechoslovakia) I Budařová	3	1
2	**(United States) K Rinaldi**	**6**	**6**

Quarterfinals
14	(Bulgaria) M Maleeva	**7**	0	2
2	**(United States) K Rinaldi**	6	**6**	**6**
