= 1982 U.S. Clay Court Championships – Women's doubles =

Women's doubles
- 1982 U.S. Clay Court Championships

Final
- Champions: (Argentina) Ivanna Madruga-Osses (France) Catherine Tanvier
- Runners-up: (United States) JoAnne Russell (Romania) Virginia Ruzici
- Score: 7–5, 7–6^{(7–4)}

Events
Singles	men	women
Doubles	men	women
← 1981 ·	U.S. Clay Court Championships	· 1983 →

Top-seeded JoAnne Russell and Virginia Ruzici were the defending champions but they lost in the final to Ivanna Madruga-Osses and Catherine Tanvier.

== Seeds ==
A champion seed is indicated in bold text while text in italics indicates the round in which that seed was eliminated.

1. (United States) JoAnne Russell / (Romania) Virginia Ruzici (final)
2. (United States) Candy Reynolds / (United States) Paula Smith (quarterfinals)
3. (Czechoslovakia) Helena Suková / (Czechoslovakia) Renáta Tomanová (semifinals)
4. (Australia) Dianne Fromholtz / (United States) Bonnie Gadusek (quarterfinals)
5. (Argentina) Ivanna Madruga-Osses / (France) Catherine Tanvier **(champions)**
6. (United States) Pam Casale / (United States) Zina Garrison (quarterfinals)
7. (Czechoslovakia) Iva Budařová / (Czechoslovakia) Marcela Skuherská (quarterfinals)
8. (United States) Nancy Neviaser / (United States) Kim Steinmetz (first round)

== Draw ==
=== Key ===
- Q = Qualifier
- WC = Wild card
- LL = Lucky loser
- Alt = Alternate
- SE = Special exempt
- PR = Protected ranking
- ITF = ITF entry
- JE = Junior exempt
- w/o = Walkover
- r = Retired
- d = Defaulted
- SR = Special ranking

=== Finals ===
Semifinals
1	**(United States) JoAnne Russell** **(Romania) Virginia Ruzici**	3	**6**	**6**
3	(Czechoslovakia) Helena Suková (Czechoslovakia) Renáta Tomanová	**6**	4	4
5	**(Argentina) Ivann Madruga-Osses** **(France) Catherine Tanvier**	2	**6**	**6**
7	(Czechoslovakia) Iva Budařová (Czechoslovakia) Marcela Skuherská	**6**	3	2

Final
1	(United States) JoAnne Russell (Romania) Virginia Ruzici	5	6
5	**(Argentina) Ivanna Madruga-Osses** **(France) Catherine Tanvier**	**7**	**7**

=== Top half ===
First round
1	**(United States) J Russell** **(Romania) V Ruzici**	**6**	**6**
(United States) L Allen (United States) F Raschiatore	4	2
(South Africa) J Mundel (South Africa) S Rollinson	4	3
**(United States) B Bruning** **(United States) H Ludloff**	**6**	**6**
**(United States) B Norton** **(Australia) E Sayers**	**6**	**6**
(United States) B Bramblett (Italy) B Rossi	4	4
**(France) S Amiach** **(France) C Vanier**	**6**	**6**
8	(United States) N Neviaser (United States) K Steinmetz	3	2
3	**(Czechoslovakia) H Suková** **(Czechoslovakia) R Tomanová**	**6**	**6**
(Hungary) M Pinterová (Japan) N Sato	1	2
**(United States) A-M Fernandez** **(United States) C Fernandez**	**6**	**6**
(United States) S Gordon (Peru) P Vásquez	2	2
(Australia) M Harris (United States) K McDaniel	3	3
**(Peru) L Arraya** **(Switzerland) H Strachoňová**	**6**	**6**
(United States) S Acker (United States) L Forood	4	**6**	1
6	**(United States) P Casale** **(United States) Z Garrison**	**6**	4	**6**

Second round
1	**(United States) J Russell** **(Romania) V Ruzici**	3	**7**	**7**
(United States) B Bruning (United States) H Ludloff	**6**	6	5
**(United States) B Norton** **(Australia) E Sayers**	**6**	**6**
(France) S Amiach (France) C Vanier	2	1
3	**(Czechoslovakia) H Suková** **(Czechoslovakia) R Tomanová**	**7**	**6**
(United States) A-M Fernandez (United States) C Fernandez	5	2
(Peru) L Arraya (Switzerland) H Strachoňová	4	3
6	**(United States) P Casale** **(United States) Z Garrison**	**6**	**6**

Quarterfinals
1	**(United States) J Russell** **(Romania) V Ruzici**	**7**	**6**
(United States) B Norton (Australia) E Sayers	6	3
3	**(Czechoslovakia) H Suková** **(Czechoslovakia) R Tomanová**	**6**	**7**
6	(United States) P Casale (United States) Z Garrison	2	5

Semifinals
1	**(United States) J Russell** **(Romania) V Ruzici**	3	**6**	**6**
3	(Czechoslovakia) H Suková (Czechoslovakia) R Tomanová	**6**	4	4

=== Bottom half ===
First round
5	**(Argentina) I Madruga-Osses** **(France) C Tanvier**	4	**7**	**6**
(United States) D Gilbert (Chile) G Ohaco	**6**	6	0
**(United States) L Bonder-Kreiss** **(South Korea) Lee D-h**	**6**	**7**
(United States) J Hepner	3	6
(United States) J Goodling (United States) V Nelson	4	1
**(United States) B Herr** **(United States) J Klitch**	**6**	**6**
(United States) K Cummings (United States) L duPont	3	3
4	**(Australia) D Fromholtz** **(United States) B Gadusek**	**6**	**6**
7	**(Czechoslovakia) I Budařová** **(Czechoslovakia) M Skuherská**	**6**	**7**
(United States) Courtney Lord (United States) Jill Patterson	1	6
**(United States) H Crowe** **(United States) Lisa Sassano**	**6**	**6**
(Jamaica) J Van Ryck de Groot (Argentina) A Villagrán	1	4
(Australia) N Gregory (United States) A Henricksson	4	4
**(New Zealand) C Newton** **(Australia) P Whytcross**	**6**	**6**
(Spain) V Baldovinos (Argentina) L Giussani	3	2
2	**(United States) C Reynolds** **(United States) P Smith**	**6**	**6**

Second round
5	**(Argentina) I Madruga-Osses** **(France) C Tanvier**	6	**6**	**6**
(United States) L Bonder-Kreiss (South Korea) Lee D-h	**7**	3	4
(United States) B Herr (United States) J Klitch	5	3
4	**(Australia) D Fromholtz** **(United States) B Gadusek**	**7**	**6**
7	**(Czechoslovakia) I Budařová** **(Czechoslovakia) M Skuherská**	**6**	**6**
(United States) H Crowe (United States) L Sassano	4	2
(New Zealand) C Newton (Australia) P Whytcross	1	0
2	**(United States) C Reynolds** **(United States) P Smith**	**6**	**6**

Quarterfinals
5	**(Argentina) I Madruga-Osses** **(France) C Tanvier**	**6**	4	**6**
4	(Australia) D Fromholtz (United States) B Gadusek	1	**6**	4
7	**(Czechoslovakia) I Budařová** **(Czechoslovakia) M Skuherská**	**6**	3	**12**
2	(United States) C Reynolds (United States) P Smith	1	**6**	10

Semifinals
5	**(Argentina) I Madruga-Osses** **(France) C Tanvier**	2	**6**	**6**
7	(Czechoslovakia) I Budařová (Czechoslovakia) M Skuherská	**6**	3	2
