= Marsha Wolak =

American poker and tennis player (born 1958)

- Full name: Marsha Bladel Wolak
- Country (sports): United States
- Born: September 6, 1958 (age 66)

Singles

Grand Slam singles results
- French Open: Q1 (1983)
- Wimbledon: Q1 (1983)
- US Open: Q1 (1982)

Marsha Bladel Wolak (born September 6, 1958) is an American professional poker player and a former international tennis player.

A native of Rock Island, Illinois, Wolak competed on the tennis tour in the 1980s. She beat Sherry Acker to make the second round of the 1982 U.S. Clay Court Championships and in 1983 featured in the qualifying draws for the French Open and Wimbledon.

Wolak was the World Series of Poker ladies champion in 2011, earning $192,344.
