= 1983 U.S. Clay Court Championships – Men's singles =

Men's singles
- 1983 U.S. Clay Court Championships

Final
- Champion: (United States) Jimmy Arias
- Runner-up: (Ecuador) Andrés Gómez
- Score: 6–4, 2–6, 6–4

Details
- Draw: 56
- Seeds: 16

Events
Singles	men	women
Doubles	men	women
- U.S. Clay Court Championships

José Higueras was the defending champion, but lost to Jimmy Brown in the second round. Third seed Jimmy Arias defeated Andrés Gómez in the final to claim the title and first prize money of $51,000 .

== Seeds ==
The top eight seeds received a bye into the second round. A champion seed is indicated in bold text while text in italics indicates the round in which that seed was eliminated.

1. (Spain) José Higueras (second round)
2. (Argentina) José Luis Clerc (third round)
3. (United States) **Jimmy Arias (champion)**
4. (Sweden) Henrik Sundström (quarterfinals)
5. (New Zealand) Chris Lewis (quarterfinals)
6. (Ecuador) Andrés Gómez (final)
7. (Israel) Shlomo Glickstein (semifinals)
8. (United States) Mel Purcell (semifinals)
9. (Australia) John Alexander (first round)
10. (Bolivia) Mario Martinez (third round)
11. (Peru) Pablo Arraya (third round)
12. (Italy) Corrado Barazzutti (third round)
13. (Uruguay) Diego Pérez (third round)
14. (Brazil) Marcos Hocevar (first round)
15. (Czechoslovakia) Libor Pimek (third round)
16. (Spain) Fernando Luna (third round)

== Draw ==
Key

- Q = Qualifier
- WC = Wild card
- LL = Lucky loser
- Alt = Alternate
- ITF = ITF entry
- PR = Protected ranking
- SR = Special ranking
- SE = Special exempt
- JE = Junior exempt
- JR = Junior Accelerator Programme entrant
- CO = College Accelerator Programme entrant
- NG = Next Gen Accelerator Program entrant
- w/o = Walkover
- r = Retired
- d = Defaulted

=== Finals ===
Quarterfinals
(United States) Jimmy Brown	5	5
6	**(Ecuador) Andrés Gómez**	**7**	**7**
4	(Sweden) Henrik Sundström	6	0
8	**(United States) Mel Purcell**	**7**	**6**
5	(New Zealand) Chris Lewis	4	5
3	**(United States) Jimmy Arias**	**6**	**7**
7	**(Israel) Shlomo Glickstein**	**7**	**6**
Q	(Argentina) Roberto Argüello	6	2

Semifinals
6	**(Ecuador) Andrés Gómez**	**7**	**6**
8	(United States) Mel Purcell	6	1
3	**(United States) Jimmy Arias**	**6**	**6**
7	(Israel) Shlomo Glickstein	1	3

Final
6	(Ecuador) Andrés Gómez	4	**6**	4
3	**(United States) Jimmy Arias**	**6**	2	**6**

=== Top half ===
==== Section 1 ====
First round
**(United States) J Brown**	**6**	**6**
Q	(United States) J Canter	4	1
**(Australia) D Carter**	**6**	**6**
(Brazil) C Kirmayr	3	2
(United States) G Holmes	5	4
11	**(Peru) P Arraya**	**7**	**6**
10	**(Bolivia) M Martinez**	**6**	**6**
(Australia) B Drewett	4	2
(United States) T Witsken	4	1
**(France) T Tulasne**	**6**	**6**
Q	(Brazil) G Mattos	3	3
**(Argentina) A Ganzábal**	**6**	**6**

Second round
1	(Spain) J Higueras	2	2
**(United States) J Brown**	**6**	**6**
(Australia) D Carter	3	**6**	3
11	**(Peru) P Arraya**	**6**	4	**6**
10	**(Bolivia) M Martinez**	1	**6**	**6**
(France) T Tulasne	**6**	3	0
(Argentina) A Ganzábal	4	4
6	**(Ecuador) A Gómez**	**6**	**6**

Third round
**(United States) J Brown**	**6**	**6**
11	(Peru) P Arraya	4	4
10	(Bolivia) M Martinez	3	6
6	**(Ecuador) A Gómez**	**6**	**7**

Quarterfinals
(United States) J Brown	5	5
6	**(Ecuador) A Gómez**	**7**	**7**

==== Section 2 ====
First round
(United States) M Cahill	5	2
**(Colombia) J Velasco**	**7**	**6**
**(Hungary) Z Kuhárszky**	**6**	4	**6**
(France) L Courteau	3	**6**	4
(Australia) CA Miller	3	1
15	**(Czechoslovakia) L Pimek**	**6**	**6**
13	**(Uruguay) D Pérez**	**6**	3	**6**
(United States) V Winitsky	0	**6**	1
(United States) Ti Gullikson	**6**	3	4
**(Italy) C Panatta**	1	**6**	**6**
(South Africa) R Venter	4	3
**(Brazil) C Motta**	**6**	**6**

Second round
4	**(Sweden) H Sundström**	**6**	**6**
(Colombia) J Velasco	3	4
(Hungary) Z Kuhárszky	2	**6**	1
15	**(Czechoslovakia) L Pimek**	**6**	4	**6**
13	**(Uruguay) D Pérez**	**6**	**6**
(Italy) C Panatta	1	4
(Brazil) C Motta	**6**	2	4
8	**(United States) M Purcell**	3	**6**	**6**

Third round
4	**(Sweden) H Sundström**	**6**	**6**
15	(Czechoslovakia) L Pimek	2	3
13	(Uruguay) D Pérez	2	2
8	**(United States) M Purcell**	**6**	**6**

Quarterfinals
4	(Sweden) H Sundström	6	0
8	**(United States) M Purcell**	**7**	**6**

=== Bottom half ===
==== Section 3 ====
First round
**(Spain) M Orantes**	**6**	**6**
(Spain) J Avendaño	3	1
**(United States) S Lipton**	**6**	**6**
(France) D Bedel	0	3
(India) R Krishnan	4	4
12	**(Italy) C Barazzutti**	**6**	**6**
16	**(Spain) F Luna**	2	**6**	**6**
(United States) A Krickstein	**6**	3	4
**(South Africa) D Tarr**	**6**	**6**
(United States) T Moor	4	4
Q	(United States) J Levine	2	3
Q	**(Chile) P Rebolledo**	**6**	**6**

Second round
5	**(New Zealand) C Lewis**	**7**	**7**
(Spain) M Orantes	6	5
(United States) S Lipton	3	2
12	**(Italy) C Barazzutti**	**6**	**6**
16	**(Spain) F Luna**	**7**	**6**
(South Africa) D Tarr	5	0
Q	(Chile) P Rebolledo	2	3
3	**(United States) J Arias**	**6**	**6**

Third round
5	**(New Zealand) C Lewis**	**7**	1	**6**
12	(Italy) C Barazzutti	5	**6**	3
16	(Spain) F Luna
3	**(United States) J Arias**	w/o

Quarterfinals
5	(New Zealand) C Lewis	4	5
3	**(United States) J Arias**	**6**	**7**

==== Section 4 ====
First round
(France) G Forget	4	4
**(United States) M Dickson**	**6**	**6**
Q	**(United Kingdom) C Dowdeswell**	**6**	**7**
Q	(France) J Vanier	4	5
**(Czechoslovakia) S Birner**	**6**	**7**
14	(Brazil) M Hocevar	4	5
9	(Australia) J Alexander	4	5
**(Italy) F Cancellotti**	**6**	**7**
(Sweden) J Gunnarsson	1	1
Q	**(Argentina) R Argüello**	**6**	**6**
(Australia) C Johnstone	4	5
**(Sweden) H Simonsson**	**6**	**7**

Second round
7	**(Israel) S Glickstein**	**6**	**6**
(United States) M Dickson	4	3
Q	**(United Kingdom) C Dowdeswell**	**6**	4	**6**
(Czechoslovakia) S Birner	4	**6**	1
(Italy) F Cancellotti	6	1
Q	**(Argentina) R Argüello**	**7**	**6**
(Sweden) H Simonsson	1	3
2	**(Argentina) JL Clerc**	**6**	**6**

Third round
7	**(Israel) S Glickstein**	**6**	**6**
Q	(United Kingdom) C Dowdeswell	4	4
Q	**(Argentina) R Argüello**	**6**
2	(Argentina) JL Clerc	1	r

Quarterfinals
7	**(Israel) S Glickstein**	**7**	**6**
Q	(Argentina) R Argüello	6	2
