= 1985 Nice International Open =

- Date: 9–14 April
- Edition: 14th
- Category: Grand Prix
- Draw: 32S / 16D
- Prize money: $80,000
- Surface: Clay / outdoor
- Location: Nice, France
- Venue: Nice Lawn Tennis Club

Champions

Singles
- (France) Henri Leconte

Doubles
- (Italy) Claudio Panatta / (Czechoslovakia) Pavel Složil
← 1984 ·	Open de Nice Côte d'Azur	· 1986 →

The 1985 Nice International Open was a men's tennis tournament played on outdoor clay courts at the Nice Lawn Tennis Club in Nice, France, and was part of the 1985 Nabisco Grand Prix. It was the 14th edition of the tournament and was held from 9 April through 14 April 1985. Fifth-seeded Henri Leconte won the singles title.

== Finals ==
=== Singles ===
(France) Henri Leconte defeated (Paraguay) Víctor Pecci 6–4, 6–4

- It was Leconte's first singles title of the year and the third of his career.

=== Doubles ===
(Italy) Claudio Panatta / (Czechoslovakia) Pavel Složil defeated (France) Loïc Courteau / (France) Guy Forget 3–6, 6–3, 8–6
