= 1991 Philips Open =

- Date: 15–21 April
- Edition: 20th
- Category: ATP World Series
- Draw: 32S / 16D
- Prize money: $225,000
- Surface: Clay / outdoor
- Location: Nice, France
- Venue: Nice Lawn Tennis Club

Champions

Singles
- (Spain) Martín Jaite

Doubles
- (Sweden) Rikard Bergh / (Sweden) Jan Gunnarsson
← 1990 ·	Open de Nice Côte d'Azur	· 1992 →

The 1991 Philips Open was a men's tennis tournament played on outdoor clay courts at the Nice Lawn Tennis Club in Nice, France, and was part of the ATP World Series of the 1991 ATP Tour. It was the 20th edition of the tournament and took place from 16 April through 22 April 1991. Unseeded Martín Jaite won the singles title.

== Finals ==
=== Singles ===
(Argentina) Martín Jaite defeated (Socialist Federal Republic of Yugoslavia) Goran Prpić 3–6, 7–6^{(7–1)}, 6–3

- It was Jaite's 1st singles title of the year and the 12th and last of his career.

=== Doubles ===
(Sweden) Rikard Bergh / (Sweden) Jan Gunnarsson defeated (Czechoslovakia) Vojtěch Flégl / (Sweden) Nicklas Utgren 6–4, 4–6, 6–3
