= 1982 U.S. Clay Court Championships =

Tennis tournament

- Date: August 2–8
- Edition: 14th
- Draw: 64S / 32D (M); 56S / 32D (W)
- Prize money: $200,000 (M) $190,000 (W)
- Surface: Clay / outdoor
- Location: Indianapolis, Indiana, US

Champions

Men's singles
- (Spain) José Higueras

Women's singles
- (Romania) Virginia Ruzici

Men's doubles
- (United States) Sherwood Stewart / (United States) Ferdi Taygan

Women's doubles
- (Argentina) Ivanna Madruga-Osses / (France) Catherine Tanvier
← 1981 ·	U.S. Clay Court Championships	· 1983 →

The 1982 U.S. Clay Court Championships was a men's Grand Prix and women's Toyota Series tennis tournament held in Indianapolis in the United States and played on outdoor clay courts. It was the 14th edition of the tournament and was held from August 2 through August 8, 1982. Fifth-seeded José Higueras and top-seeded Virginia Ruzici won the singles titles.

== Finals ==
=== Men's singles ===
(Spain) José Higueras defeated (United States) Jimmy Arias 7–5, 5–7, 6–3

- It was Higueras' 2nd title of the year and the 11th of his career.

=== Women's singles ===
(Romania) Virginia Ruzici defeated (Czechoslovakia) Helena Suková 6–2, 6–0

- It was Ruzici's 3rd title of the year and the 10th of her career.

=== Men's doubles ===
(United States) Sherwood Stewart / (United States) Ferdi Taygan defeated (South Africa) Robbie Venter / (United States) Blaine Willenborg 6–4, 7–5

=== Women's doubles ===
(Argentina) Ivanna Madruga-Osses / (France) Catherine Tanvier defeated (United States) JoAnne Russell / (Romania) Virginia Ruzici 7–5, 7–6^{(7–4)}
