= 1986 Nice International Open =

- Date: 14–20 April
- Edition: 15th
- Category: Grand Prix
- Draw: 32S / 16D
- Prize money: $85,000
- Surface: Clay / outdoor
- Location: Nice, France
- Venue: Nice Lawn Tennis Club

Champions

Singles
- (Spain) Emilio Sánchez

Doubles
- (Switzerland) Jakob Hlasek / (Czechoslovakia) Pavel Složil
- Open de Nice Côte d'Azur

The 1986 Nice International Open was a men's tennis tournament played on outdoor clay courts at the Nice Lawn Tennis Club in Nice, France, and was part of the 1986 Nabisco Grand Prix. It was the 15th edition of the tournament and was held from 14 April through 20 April 1986. Unseeded Emilio Sánchez won the singles title.

== Finals ==
=== Singles ===
(Spain) Emilio Sánchez defeated (Australia) Paul McNamee 6–1, 6–3

- It was Sánchez' first singles title of his career.

=== Doubles ===
(Switzerland) Jakob Hlasek / (Czechoslovakia) Pavel Složil defeated (United States) Gary Donnelly / (United Kingdom) Colin Dowdeswell 6–3, 3–6, 11–9
