= Heinz Günthardt =

Swiss tennis player (born 1959)

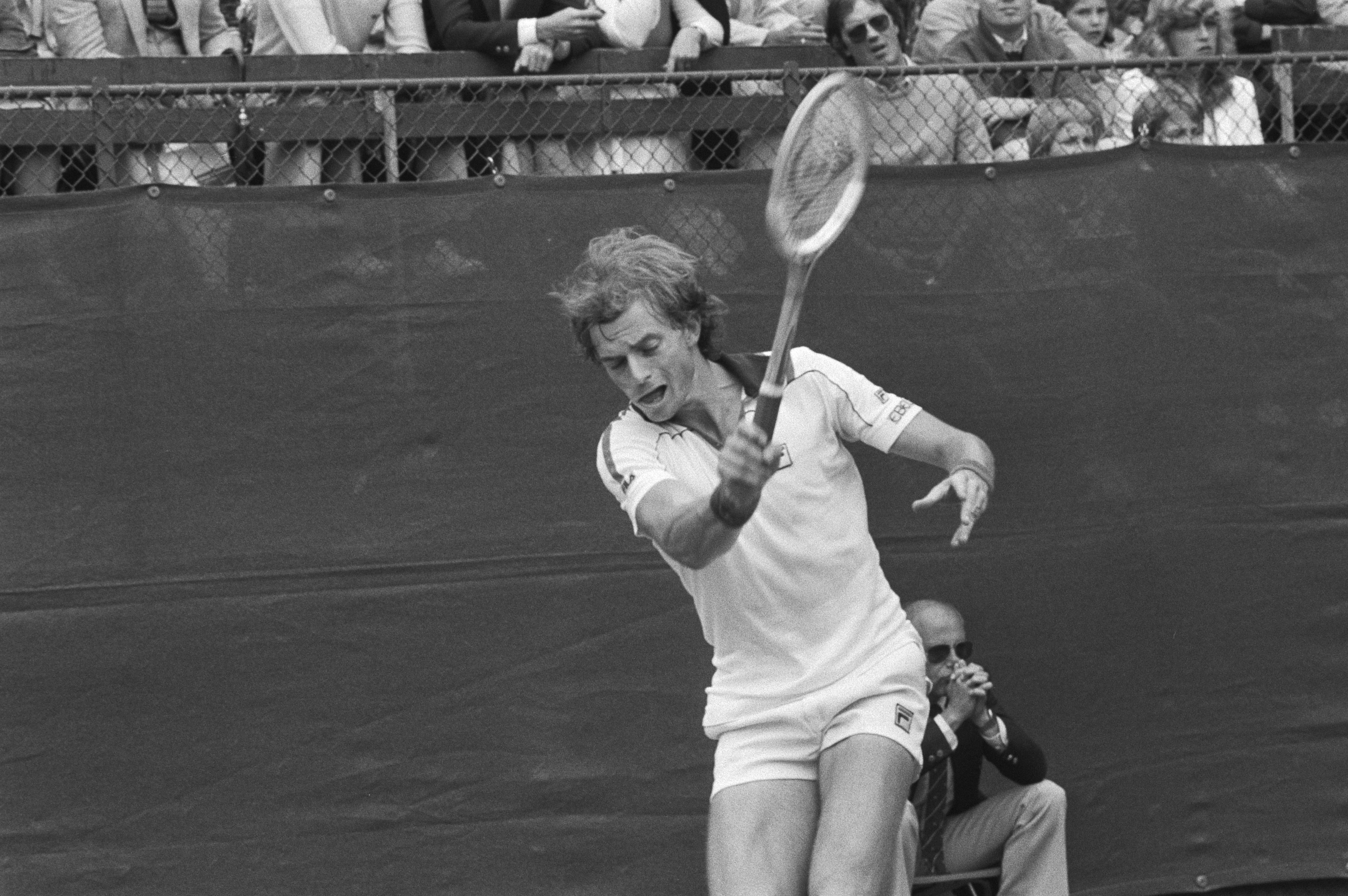
- Günthardt in Hilversum 1981
- Full name: Heinz Peter Günthardt
- Country (sports): Switzerland
- Born: 8 February 1959 (age 67) Zürich, Switzerland
- Height: 1.80 m (5 ft 11 in)
- Turned pro: 1976
- Retired: 1990
- Plays: Right-handed (one-handed backhand)
- Prize money: $1,550,007

Singles
- Career record: 228–193
- Career titles: 5
- Highest ranking: No. 22 (7 April 1986)

Grand Slam singles results
- French Open: 4R (1985)
- Wimbledon: QF (1985)
- US Open: QF (1985)

Other tournaments
- WCT Finals: QF (1980)

Doubles
- Career record: 409–227
- Career titles: 30
- Highest ranking: No. 3 (8 July 1985)

Grand Slam doubles results
- Australian Open: 2R (1990)
- French Open: W (1981)
- Wimbledon: W (1985)
- US Open: F (1981)

Other doubles tournaments
- Olympic Games: 2R (1988)

Mixed doubles
- Career titles: 2

Grand Slam mixed doubles results
- French Open: W (1985)
- Wimbledon: F (1986)
- US Open: W (1985)

Heinz Peter Günthardt (Swiss Standard German pronunciation: [haɪnts ˈɡʏnthart]; born 8 February 1959) is a retired tennis player from Switzerland.

== Tennis player career ==
Günthardt won five singles titles during his professional career, including the Rotterdam WCT in 1980. The right-hander reached his career-high ATP singles ranking of world No. 22 in April 1986.

In doubles, he captured a total number of 30 titles. Günthardt won the men's doubles at the 1981 Roland Garros and the 1985 Wimbledon Championships with Balázs Taróczy, and the mixed doubles at the 1985 US Open with Martina Navratilova. He was also a member of the Swiss team at the 1988 Olympic Games.

== Coaching career ==
Günthardt was the coach of Steffi Graf from the start of 1992 until the end of Graf's tennis playing career in July 1999, and he also worked briefly with Jelena Dokić and Jennifer Capriati.

From February to November 2010, he coached former world No. 1 Ana Ivanovic. He had not coached full-time since Graf's retirement in 1999. When Günthardt started coaching her, Ivanovic had dropped out of the WTA's top 20, and she dropped to a career low of world No. 65 in July 2010. During their partnership, Ivanovic recovered to world No. 17 before Günthardt ended his coaching relationship with her due to family responsibilities.

Günthardt has been captain of the Swiss Fed Cup team since March 2012. He reached the final with the team in 2021, and won the Cup in 2022.

== Career finals ==
=== Singles: 9 (5–4) ===
Result	W-L	Date	Tournament	Surface	Opponent	Score
Win	1–0	Feb 1978	Springfield, US	Carpet (i)	(United States) Harold Solomon	6–3, 3–6, 6–2
Win	2–0	Mar 1980	Rotterdam, Netherlands	Carpet (i)	(United States) Gene Mayer	6–2, 6–4
Win	3–0	Apr 1980	Johannesburg, South Africa	Hard	(United States) Victor Amaya	6–4, 6–4
Win	4–0	Jul 1980	Gstaad, Switzerland	Clay	(Australia) Kim Warwick	4–6, 6–4, 7–6^{(7–1)}
Loss	4–1	Jul 1981	Hilversum, Netherlands	Clay	(Hungary) Balázs Taróczy	3–6, 7–6, 4–6
Loss	4–2	Jul 1982	Zell Am See WCT, Austria	Clay	(Argentina) José Luis Clerc	0–6, 6–3, 2–6, 1–6
Loss	4–3	Jul 1983	Stuttgart Outdoor, Germany	Clay	(Spain) José Higueras	1–6, 1–6, 6–7
Win	5–3	Nov 1983	Toulouse, France	Hard (i)	(Peru) Pablo Arraya	6–0, 6–2
Loss	5–4	Nov 1984	Toulouse, France	Hard (i)	(United States) Mark Dickson	6–7^{(2–7)}, 4–6

=== Doubles: 59 (30–29) ===
Result	W-L	Date	Tournament	Surface	Partner	Opponents	Score
Loss	0–1	Aug 1978	Toronto, Canada	Clay	(Switzerland) Colin Dowdeswell	(Poland) Wojciech Fibak (Netherlands) Tom Okker	3–6, 6–7
Loss	0–2	Apr 1979	Rotterdam, Netherlands	Carpet (i)	(South Africa) Bernard Mitton	(United States) Peter Fleming (United States) John McEnroe	4–6, 4–6
Win	1–2	Apr 1979	Johannesburg, South Africa	Hard	(Switzerland) Colin Dowdeswell	(South Africa) Raymond Moore (Romania) Ilie Năstase	6–3, 7–6
Win	2–2	Jul 1979	Båstad, Sweden	Clay	(South Africa) Bob Hewitt	(Australia) Mark Edmondson (Australia) John Marks	6–2, 6–2
Win	3–2	Jul 1979	Kitzbühel, Austria	Clay	(Socialist Federal Republic of Yugoslavia) Željko Franulović	(Australia) Dick Crealy (Italy) Antonio Zugarelli	6–2, 6–4
Loss	3–3	Aug 1979	Toronto, Canada	Hard	(South Africa) Bob Hewitt	(United States) Peter Fleming (United States) John McEnroe	7–6, 6–7, 1–6
Loss	3–4	Nov 1979	Cologne, Germany	Hard (i)	(Czechoslovakia) Pavel Složil	(United States) Gene Mayer (United States) Stan Smith	3–6, 4–6
Loss	3–5	Feb 1980	Denver, US	Carpet	(Poland) Wojciech Fibak	(South Africa) Kevin Curren (United States) Steve Denton	5–7, 2–6
Loss	3–6	Apr 1980	Johannesburg, South Africa	Hard	(Switzerland) Colin Dowdeswell	(South Africa) Bob Hewitt (South Africa) Frew McMillan	4–6, 3–6
Win	4–6	May 1980	Munich, Germany	Clay	(South Africa) Bob Hewitt	(Australia) David Carter (New Zealand) Chris Lewis	7–6, 6–1
Win	5–6	Jul 1980	Båstad, Sweden	Clay	(Switzerland) Markus Günthardt	(United Kingdom) John Feaver (Australia) Peter McNamara	6–4, 6–4
Loss	5–7	Aug 1980	Toronto, Canada	Hard	(United States) Sandy Mayer	(United States) Bruce Manson (United States) Brian Teacher	3–6, 6–3, 4–6
Loss	5–8	Sep 1980	Geneva, Switzerland	Clay	(Switzerland) Markus Günthardt	(Socialist Federal Republic of Yugoslavia) Željko Franulović (Hungary) Balázs Taróczy	4–6, 6–4, 4–6
Loss	5–9	Oct 1980	Vienna, Austria	Hard (i)	(Czechoslovakia) Pavel Složil	(United States) Robert Lutz (United States) Stan Smith	1–6, 2–6
Win	6–9	Nov 1980	Stockholm, Sweden	Carpet (i)	(Australia) Paul McNamee	(United States) Robert Lutz (United States) Stan Smith	6–7, 6–3, 6–2
Loss	6–10	Dec 1980	Johannesburg, South Africa	Hard	(Australia) Paul McNamee	(United States) Robert Lutz (United States) Stan Smith	7–6, 3–6, 4–6
Win	7–10	Apr 1981	Monte-Carlo, Monaco	Clay	(Hungary) Balázs Taróczy	(Czechoslovakia) Pavel Složil (Czechoslovakia) Tomáš Šmíd	6–3, 6–3
Win	8–10	Jun 1981	French Open, Paris	Clay	(Hungary) Balázs Taróczy	(United States) Terry Moor (United States) Eliot Teltscher	6–2, 7–6, 6–3
Win	9–10	Jul 1981	Gstaad, Switzerland	Clay	(Switzerland) Markus Günthardt	(Australia) David Carter (Australia) Paul Kronk	6–4, 6–1
Win	10–10	Jul 1981	Hilversum, Netherlands	Clay	(Hungary) Balázs Taróczy	(South Africa) Raymond Moore (South Africa) Andrew Pattison	6–0, 6–2
Win	11–10	Aug 1981	North Conway, US	Clay	(Australia) Peter McNamara	(Czechoslovakia) Pavel Složil (United States) Ferdi Taygan	6–7, 7–5, 6–4
Loss	11–11	Sep 1981	US Open, New York	Hard	(Australia) Peter McNamara	(United States) Peter Fleming (United States) John McEnroe	def.
Win	12–11	Sep 1981	Sawgrass Doubles, US	Clay	(Australia) Peter McNamara	(United States) Robert Lutz (United States) Stan Smith	7–6, 3–6, 7–6, 5–7, 6–4
Win	13–11	Sep 1981	Geneva, Switzerland	Clay	(Hungary) Balázs Taróczy	(Czechoslovakia) Pavel Složil (Czechoslovakia) Tomáš Šmíd	6–4, 3–6, 6–2
Loss	13–12	Oct 1981	Madrid, Spain	Clay	(Czechoslovakia) Tomáš Šmíd	(Chile) Hans Gildemeister (Ecuador) Andrés Gómez	4–6, 6–3, 3–6
Win	14–12	Oct 1981	Tokyo Outdoor, Japan	Clay	(Hungary) Balázs Taróczy	(United States) Larry Stefanki (United States) Robert Van't Hof	3–6, 6–2, 6–1
Loss	14–13	Oct 1981	Tokyo Indoor, Japan	Carpet (i)	(Hungary) Balázs Taróczy	(United States) Victor Amaya (United States) Hank Pfister	4–6, 2–6
Win	15–13	Jan 1982	Masters Doubles WCT, London	Carpet (i)	(Hungary) Balázs Taróczy	(South Africa) Kevin Curren (United States) Steve Denton	6–7, 6–3, 7–5, 6–4
Loss	15–14	Feb 1982	Cairo, Egypt	Clay	(Switzerland) Markus Günthardt	(United States) Drew Gitlin (United States) Jim Gurfein	4–6, 5–7
Win	16–14	Mar 1982	Milan, Italy	Carpet (i)	(Australia) Peter McNamara	(Australia) Mark Edmondson (United States) Sherwood Stewart	7–6, 7–6
Loss	16–15	May 1982	Madrid, Spain	Clay	(Hungary) Balázs Taróczy	(Czechoslovakia) Pavel Složil (Czechoslovakia) Tomáš Šmíd	1–6, 6–3, 7–9
Win	17–15	May 1982	Rome, Italy	Clay	(Hungary) Balázs Taróczy	(Poland) Wojciech Fibak (Australia) John Fitzgerald	6–4, 4–6, 6–3
Loss	17–16	Jul 1982	Gstaad, Switzerland	Clay	(Switzerland) Markus Günthardt	(United States) Sandy Mayer (United States) Ferdi Taygan	2–6, 3–6
Loss	17–17	Jul 1982	Hilversum, Netherlands	Clay	(Hungary) Balázs Taróczy	(Czechoslovakia) Jan Kodeš (Czechoslovakia) Tomáš Šmíd	6–7, 4–6
Loss	17–18	Nov 1982	Wembley, UK	Carpet (i)	(Czechoslovakia) Tomáš Šmíd	(United States) Peter Fleming (United States) John McEnroe	6–7, 4–6
Win	18–18	Jan 1983	Masters Doubles WCT, London	Carpet (i)	(Hungary) Balázs Taróczy	(United States) Brian Gottfried (Mexico) Raúl Ramírez	6–3, 7–5, 7–6
Win	19–18	Mar 1983	Brussels, Belgium	Carpet (i)	(Hungary) Balázs Taróczy	(Sweden) Hans Simonsson (Sweden) Mats Wilander	6–2, 6–4
Loss	19–19	Mar 1983	Munich WCT, Germany	Carpet (i)	(Hungary) Balázs Taróczy	(South Africa) Kevin Curren (United States) Steve Denton	5–7, 6–2, 1–6
Win	20–19	Apr 1983	Monte-Carlo, Monaco	Clay	(Hungary) Balázs Taróczy	(France) Henri Leconte (France) Yannick Noah	6–2, 6–4
Loss	20–20	Apr 1983	Bournemouth, UK	Clay	(Hungary) Balázs Taróczy	(Czechoslovakia) Tomáš Šmíd (United States) Sherwood Stewart	6–7, 5–7
Win	21–20	May 1983	Madrid, Spain	Clay	(Czechoslovakia) Pavel Složil	(Switzerland) Markus Günthardt (Hungary) Zoltán Kuhárszky	6–3, 6–3
Win	22–20	May 1983	Hamburg, Germany	Clay	(Hungary) Balázs Taróczy	(Australia) Mark Edmondson (United States) Brian Gottfried	7–6, 4–6, 6–4
Win	23–20	Jul 1983	Hilversum, Netherlands	Clay	(Hungary) Balázs Taróczy	(Czechoslovakia) Jan Kodeš (Czechoslovakia) Tomáš Šmíd	3–6, 6–2, 6–3
Win	24–20	Nov 1983	Toulouse, France	Hard (i)	(Czechoslovakia) Pavel Složil	(South Africa) Bernard Mitton (United States) Butch Walts	5–7, 7–5, 6–4
Loss	24–21	Feb 1984	Memphis, US	Carpet (i)	(Czechoslovakia) Tomáš Šmíd	(United States) Fritz Buehning (United States) Peter Fleming	5–7, 6–7
Loss	24–22	May 1984	Hamburg, Germany	Clay	(Hungary) Balázs Taróczy	(Sweden) Stefan Edberg (Sweden) Anders Järryd	3–6, 1–6
Win	25–22	Jul 1984	Gstaad, Switzerland	Clay	(Switzerland) Markus Günthardt	(Brazil) Givaldo Barbosa (Brazil) João Soares	6–4, 3–6, 7–6
Loss	25–23	Aug 1984	Indianapolis, US	Clay	(Hungary) Balázs Taróczy	(United States) Ken Flach (United States) Robert Seguso	6–7, 5–7
Loss	25–24	Oct 1984	Vienna, Austria	Hard (i)	(Hungary) Balázs Taróczy	(Poland) Wojciech Fibak (United States) Sandy Mayer	4–6, 4–6
Loss	25–25	Jan 1985	Masters Doubles WCT, London	Carpet (i)	(Hungary) Balázs Taróczy	(United States) Ken Flach (United States) Robert Seguso	3–6, 6–3, 3–6, 0–6
Win	26–25	Feb 1985	La Quinta, US	Hard	(Hungary) Balázs Taróczy	(United States) Ken Flach (United States) Robert Seguso	3–6, 7–6, 6–3
Win	27–25	Mar 1985	Milan, Italy	Carpet (i)	(Sweden) Anders Järryd	(Australia) Broderick Dyke (Australia) Wally Masur	6–2, 6–1
Loss	27–26	Apr 1985	Hamburg, Germany	Clay	(Hungary) Balázs Taróczy	(Chile) Hans Gildemeister (Ecuador) Andrés Gómez	6–1, 6–7, 4–6
Win	28–26	Jul 1985	Wimbledon, London	Grass	(Hungary) Balázs Taróczy	(Australia) Pat Cash (Australia) John Fitzgerald	6–4, 6–3, 4–6, 6–3
Win	29–26	Jan 1986	Masters Doubles WCT, London	Carpet (i)	(Hungary) Balázs Taróczy	(United States) Paul Annacone (South Africa) Christo van Rensburg	6–4, 1–6, 7–6, 6–7, 6–4
Win	30–26	Aug 1986	Kitzbühel, Austria	Clay	(Czechoslovakia) Tomáš Šmíd	(Chile) Hans Gildemeister (Ecuador) Andrés Gómez	4–6, 6–3, 7–6
Loss	30–27	Apr 1988	Nice, France	Clay	(Italy) Diego Nargiso	(France) Guy Forget (France) Henri Leconte	6–4, 3–6, 4–6
Loss	30–28	Feb 1989	Milan, Italy	Carpet (i)	(Hungary) Balázs Taróczy	(Switzerland) Jakob Hlasek (United States) John McEnroe	3–6, 4–6
Loss	30–29	Apr 1989	Nice, France	Clay	(Hungary) Balázs Taróczy	(West Germany) Ricki Osterthun (West Germany) Udo Riglewski	6–7, 7–6, 1–6
