= 1987 Nice International Open =

- Date: 13–19 April
- Edition: 16th
- Category: Grand Prix
- Draw: 32S / 16D
- Prize money: $89,400
- Surface: Clay / outdoor
- Location: Nice, France
- Venue: Nice Lawn Tennis Club

Champions

Singles
- (Sweden) Kent Carlsson

Doubles
- (Spain) Sergio Casal / (Spain) Emilio Sánchez
← 1986 ·	Open de Nice Côte d'Azur	· 1988 →

The 1987 Nice International Open was a men's tennis tournament played on outdoor clay courts at the Nice Lawn Tennis Club in Nice, France, and was part of the 1987 Nabisco Grand Prix. It was the 16th edition of the tournament and was held from 13 April through 19 April 1987. First-seeded Kent Carlsson won the singles title.

== Finals ==
=== Singles ===
(Sweden) Kent Carlsson defeated (Spain) Emilio Sánchez 7–6, 6–3

- It was Carlsson's 1st singles title of the year and the 3rd of his career.

=== Doubles ===
(Spain) Sergio Casal / (Spain) Emilio Sánchez defeated (Switzerland) Claudio Mezzadri / (Italy) Gianni Ocleppo 6–3, 6–3
