= Henri Leconte =

French tennis player (born 1963)

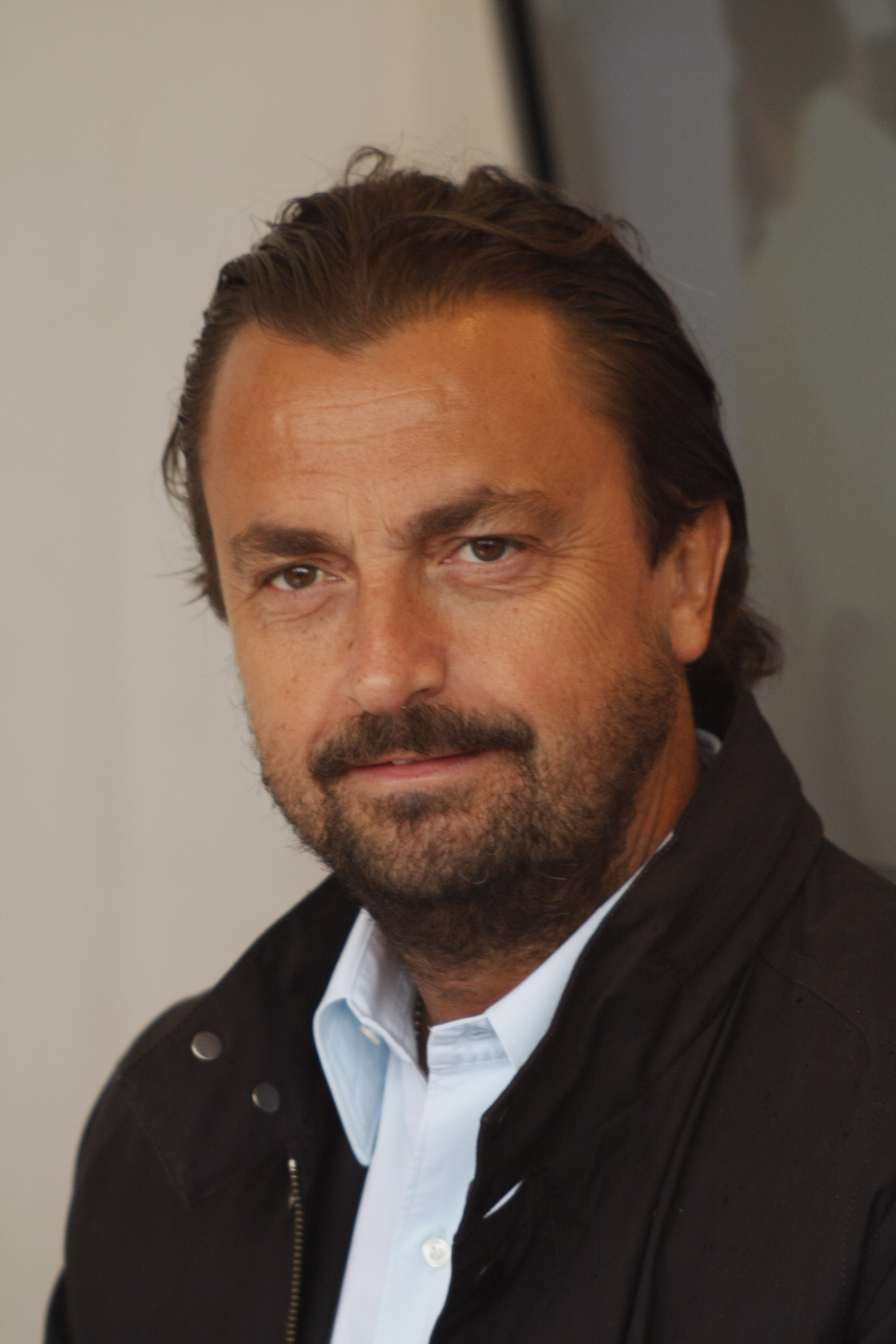
- Henri Leconte in 2011
- Country (sports): France
- Residence: Geneva, Switzerland
- Born: 4 July 1963 (age 63) Lillers, France
- Height: 1.85 m (6 ft 1 in)
- Turned pro: 1980
- Retired: 1996
- Plays: Left-handed (one-handed backhand)
- Prize money: $3,440,660

Singles
- Career record: 377–269 (58.4%)
- Career titles: 9
- Highest ranking: No. 5 (22 September 1986)

Grand Slam singles results
- Australian Open: 4R (1985)
- French Open: F (1988)
- Wimbledon: SF (1986)
- US Open: QF (1986)

Other tournaments
- Tour Finals: RR (1985, 1986, 1988)
- Grand Slam Cup: QF (1990, 1992)

Doubles
- Career record: 200–141 (58.7%)
- Career titles: 10
- Highest ranking: No. 6 (18 March 1985)

Grand Slam doubles results
- Australian Open: QF (1990)
- French Open: W (1984)
- Wimbledon: 2R (1985, 1987)
- US Open: F (1985)

Team competitions
- Davis Cup: W (1991)

Henri Leconte (French: [ɑ̃ʁi ləkɔ̃t]; born 4 July 1963) is a French former professional tennis player. He reached the men's singles final at the French Open in 1988, won the French Open men's doubles title in 1984, and helped France win the Davis Cup in 1991. During his career, he won singles titles on all four major court surfaces: hard, clay, grass and carpet. Leconte's career-high singles ranking was world No. 5.

== Biography and career ==
Leconte first came to the tennis world's attention as an outstanding junior player who won the French Open junior title in 1981. He turned professional that year and won his first career doubles title at Bologna, and his first top-level singles title the following year, 1982, in Stockholm. Leconte played in the Davis Cup final for the first time in 1982, when France was defeated 4–1 by the United States.

Leconte teamed up with Yannick Noah to win the men's doubles title at the French Open in 1984. In 1985, Leconte and Noah reached a second Grand Slam doubles final at the US Open, where they finished runners-up. Leconte reached his career-high doubles ranking of world No. 6 in 1985. In singles in 1985, Leconte reached the quarterfinals of the French Open and Wimbledon, the latter run of which included a dazzling win over world no. 2, Ivan Lendl, in the fourth round.

1986 saw Leconte reach two Grand Slam singles semi-finals at the French Open and Wimbledon, and attain his career-high singles ranking of world No. 5. Leconte also played on the French team that won the World Team Cup that year.

In 1988, Leconte reached the men's singles final at the French Open beating Simon Youl, Bruno Orešar, Horacio de la Peña, Boris Becker, Andrei Chesnokov and Jonas Svensson. In the final, Leconte could not overcome two-time former champion Mats Wilander who defeated him in straight sets.

In 1991, Leconte was involved in the Davis Cup final for a second time. France again faced the US, and this time Leconte defeated Pete Sampras in straight sets in a critical singles rubber, and also teamed with Guy Forget to win the doubles rubber, as France upset the heavily favoured U.S. team 3–1.

In total, Leconte played for France's Davis Cup team for a total of 13 consecutive years, compiling a 41–25 record. He compiled a doubles record of 17–5 and was undefeated with Guy Forget (11 wins), winning his last 14 doubles matches (from March 1985 to July 1993).

In 1992, Leconte reached the semi finals at the French Open, losing to eventual runner-up Petr Korda.

Leconte won his final top-level singles title in 1993 in Halle. He also won his final doubles title that year at Indian Wells.

Leconte retired from the professional tour in 1996, having won a total of nine career singles titles and ten doubles titles. Playing on the ATP Champions Tour for over-35's, he formed a doubles partnership with the Iranian player Mansour Bahrami.

He is now the manager of an event company (HL Event) based in Belgium and opened a tennis academy in Fès, Morocco, in 2006.

Since 2010, Leconte has appeared on Australian television as a commentator on the Seven Network's coverage of the Australian Open. There, he obtained a cult following as a result of a zany exhibition doubles performance, and his passionate and often parochial commentary, especially for compatriot Jo-Wilfried Tsonga, whose winning shots he routinely described as "unbelievable!"

In 2014, Leconte appeared as a commentator for the 2014 Australian Open. One match he commentated was the third-round match between Frenchmen Gilles Simon and Jo-Wilfried Tsonga. He has since appeared regularly as a commentator for matches involving French players in the men's draw.

== Grand Slam singles performance timeline ==
Key
W	F	SF	QF	#R	RR	Q#	DNQ	A	NH

(W) winner; (F) finalist; (SF) semifinalist; (QF) quarterfinalist; (#R) rounds 4, 3, 2, 1; (RR) round-robin stage; (Q#) qualification round; (DNQ) did not qualify; (A) absent; (NH) not held; (SR) strike rate (events won / competed); (W–L) win–loss record.

Tournament	1980	1981	1982	1983	1984	1985	1986	1987	1988	1989	1990	1991	1992	1993	1994	1995	1996	SR	W–L
Australian Open	A	LQ	A	A	A	4R	NH	3R	3R	1R	3R	A	1R	A	2R	A	A	0 / 7	8–7
French Open	1R	1R	1R	2R	2R	QF	SF	1R	F	A	QF	2R	SF	1R	1R	A	1R	0 / 15	27–15
Wimbledon	Q	2R	1R	2R	A	QF	SF	QF	4R	A	2R	3R	3R	4R	1R	1R	A	0 / 13	26–13
US Open	A	A	1R	A	3R	4R	QF	4R	3R	A	2R	A	3R	1R	A	A	A	0 / 9	17–9
Win–loss	0–1	1–2	0–3	2–2	3–2	13–4	14–3	8–4	13–4	0–1	8–4	3–2	9–4	3–3	1–3	0–1	0–1	0 / 44	78–44

== Trivia ==
He participated in 2005 in the second season of La Ferme Célébrités, a TV reality game show. In 2007, his son Maxime also participated in the TV reality game show Secret Story, the French version of Big Brother. He also appeared as a contestant on BBC Celebrity Masterchef 2017, reaching the semifinals.

== Major finals ==
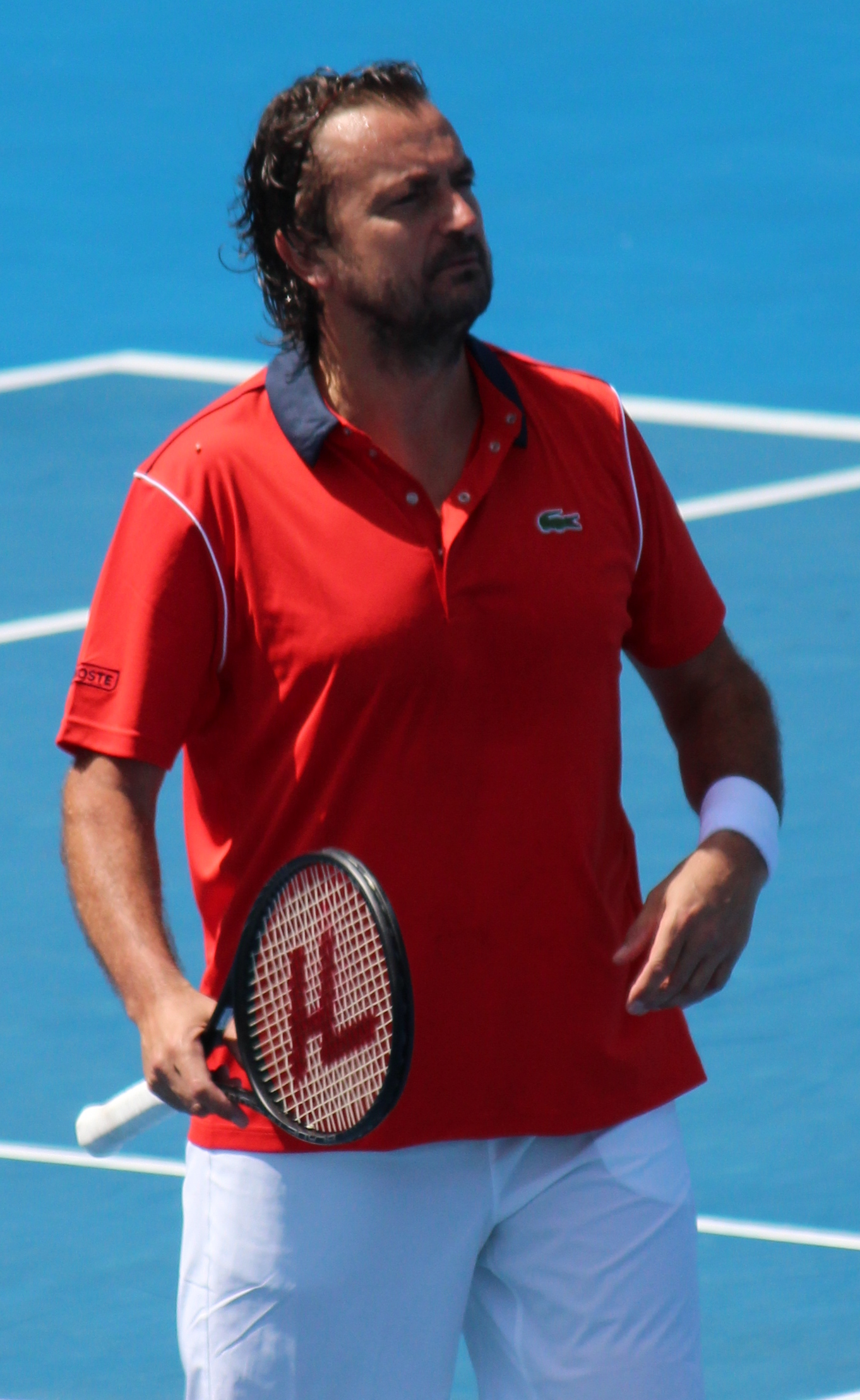
Leconte at the 2015 Australian Open

=== Grand Slam finals ===
==== Singles: 1 (0–1) ====
Result	Year	Championship	Surface	Opponent	Score
Loss	1988	French Open	Clay	(Sweden) Mats Wilander	5–7, 2–6, 1–6

==== Doubles: 2 (1–1) ====
Result	Year	Championship	Surface	Partner	Opponents	Score
Win	1984	French Open	Clay	(France) Yannick Noah	(Czechoslovakia) Pavel Složil (Czechoslovakia) Tomáš Šmíd	6–4, 2–6, 3–6, 6–3, 6–2
Loss	1985	US Open	Hard	(France) Yannick Noah	(United States) Ken Flach (United States) Robert Seguso	7–6^{(7–5)}, 6–7^{(1–7)}, 6–7^{(6–8)}, 0–6

=== Masters Series finals ===
==== Doubles: 2 (1–1) ====
Result	Year	Tournament	Surface	Partner	Opponents	Score
Loss	1991	Indian Wells, US	Hard	(France) Guy Forget	(United States) Jim Courier (Spain) Javier Sánchez	6–7^{(1–7)}, 6–3, 3–6
Win	1993	Indian Wells, US	Hard	(France) Guy Forget	(United States) Luke Jensen (United States) Scott Melville	6–4, 7–5

== Career finals ==
=== Singles: 16 (9 titles, 7 runners-up) ===
Result	W/L	Date	Tournament	Surface	Opponent	Score
Win	1–0	Nov 1982	Stockholm, Sweden	Hard (i)	(Sweden) Mats Wilander	7–6^{(7–4)}, 6–3
Loss	1–1	Jul 1983	Kitzbühel, Austria	Clay	(Argentina) Guillermo Vilas	6–7^{(4–7)}, 6–4, 4–6
Loss	1–2	Oct 1983	Sydney Indoor, Australia	Hard (i)	(United States) John McEnroe	1–6, 4–6, 5–7
Loss	1–3	Feb 1984	Memphis, United States	Carpet (i)	(United States) Jimmy Connors	3–6, 6–4, 5–7
Win	2–3	Jul 1984	Stuttgart Outdoor, West Germany	Clay	(United States) Gene Mayer	7–6^{(11–9)}, 6–0, 1–6, 6–1
Win	3–3	Apr 1985	Nice, France	Clay	(Paraguay) Víctor Pecci	6–4, 6–4
Loss	3–4	Oct 1985	Sydney Indoor, Australia	Hard (i)	(Czechoslovakia) Ivan Lendl	4–6, 4–6, 6–7^{(6–8)}
Win	4–4	Dec 1985	Sydney Outdoor, Australia	Grass	(New Zealand) Kelly Evernden	6–7^{(6–8)}, 6–2, 6–3
Loss	4–5	Jun 1986	Bristol, United Kingdom	Grass	(India) Vijay Amritraj	6–7^{(6–8)}, 6–1, 6–8
Win	5–5	Sep 1986	Geneva, Switzerland	Clay	(France) Thierry Tulasne	7–5, 6–3
Win	6–5	Sep 1986	Hamburg, West Germany	Clay	(Czechoslovakia) Miloslav Mečíř	6–2, 5–7, 6–4, 6–2
Win	7–5	Apr 1988	Nice, France	Clay	(France) Jérôme Potier	6–2, 6–2
Loss	7–6	May 1988	Hamburg, West Germany	Clay	(Sweden) Kent Carlsson	2–6, 1–6, 4–6
Loss	7–7	Jun 1988	French Open, Paris	Clay	(Sweden) Mats Wilander	5–7, 2–6, 1–6
Win	8–7	Nov 1988	Brussels, Belgium	Carpet (i)	(Switzerland) Jakob Hlasek	7–6^{(7–3)}, 7–6^{(8–6)}, 6–4
Win	9–7	Jun 1993	Halle, Germany	Grass	(Ukraine) Andriy Medvedev	6–2, 6–3

=== Doubles: 19 (10–9) ===
Result	W/L	Date	Tournament	Surface	Partner	Opponents	Score
Win	1–0	1981	Bologna, Italy	Carpet (i)	(United States) Sammy Giammalva Jr.	(Czechoslovakia) Tomáš Šmíd (Hungary) Balázs Taróczy	7–6, 6–4
Win	2–0	1982	Nice, France	Clay	(France) Yannick Noah	(Australia) Paul McNamee (Hungary) Balázs Taróczy	5–7, 6–4, 6–3
Loss	2–1	1982	Bournemouth, England	Clay	(Romania) Ilie Năstase	(Australia) Paul McNamee (United Kingdom) Buster Mottram	6–3, 6–7, 3–6
Win	3–1	1982	Basel, Switzerland	Hard (i)	(France) Yannick Noah	(United States) Fritz Buehning (Czechoslovakia) Pavel Složil	6–2, 6–2
Win	4–1	1982	Vienna, Austria	Carpet (i)	(Czechoslovakia) Pavel Složil	(United States) Mark Dickson (United States) Terry Moor	6–1, 7–6
Loss	4–2	1983	Monte-Carlo Masters, Monaco	Clay	(France) Yannick Noah	(Switzerland) Heinz Günthardt (Hungary) Balázs Taróczy	2–6, 4–6
Win	5–2	1983	Aix-en-Provence, France	Clay	(France) Gilles Moretton	(Chile) Iván Camus (Spain) Sergio Casal	2–6, 6–1, 6–2
Loss	5–3	1984	Philadelphia, United States	Carpet (i)	(France) Yannick Noah	(United States) Peter Fleming (United States) John McEnroe	2–6, 3–6
Win	6–3	1984	French Open, Paris	Clay	(France) Yannick Noah	(Czechoslovakia) Pavel Složil (Czechoslovakia) Tomáš Šmíd	6–4, 2–6, 3–6, 6–3, 6–2
Win	7–3	1984	Kitzbühel, Austria	Clay	(France) Pascal Portes	(United Kingdom) Colin Dowdeswell (Poland) Wojtek Fibak	2–6, 7–6, 7–6
Win	8–3	1984	Stockholm, Sweden	Hard (i)	(Czechoslovakia) Tomáš Šmíd	(India) Vijay Amritraj (Romania) Ilie Năstase	3–6, 7–6, 6–4
Loss	8–4	1985	US Open, New York	Hard	(France) Yannick Noah	(United States) Ken Flach (United States) Robert Seguso	7–6, 6–7, 6–7, 0–6
Win	9–4	1988	Nice, France	Clay	(France) Guy Forget	(Switzerland) Heinz Günthardt (Italy) Diego Nargiso	4–6, 6–3, 6–4
Loss	9–5	1988	Monte-Carlo Masters, Monaco	Clay	(Czechoslovakia) Ivan Lendl	(Spain) Sergio Casal (Spain) Emilio Sánchez	0–6, 3–6
Loss	9–6	1990	Queen's Club, England	Grass	(Czechoslovakia) Ivan Lendl	(United Kingdom) Jeremy Bates (United States) Kevin Curren	2–6, 6–7
Loss	9–7	1991	Indian Wells, United States	Hard	(France) Guy Forget	(United States) Jim Courier (Spain) Javier Sánchez	6–7, 6–3, 3–6
Loss	9–8	1992	Toulouse, France	Hard (i)	(France) Guy Forget	(United States) Brad Pearce (South Africa) Byron Talbot	1–6, 6–3, 3–6
Win	10–8	1993	Indian Wells, United States	Hard	(France) Guy Forget	(United States) Luke Jensen (United States) Scott Melville	6–4, 7–5
Loss	10–9	1994	Halle, Germany	Grass	(South Africa) Gary Muller	(France) Olivier Delaître (France) Guy Forget	4–6, 7–6, 4–6

Awards and achievements
Preceded by Florence Arthaud; Max Morinière; Daniel Sangouma; Jean-Charles Trouabal; Bruno Marie-Rose	French Sportsperson of the Year; 1991 (with Guy Forget)	Succeeded by Marie-José Pérec
Preceded by (United States) Jimmy Connors	ATP Comeback Player of the Year; 1992	Succeeded by (Sweden) Mikael Pernfors
