= Jérôme Potier =

French tennis player

- Country (sports): France
- Residence: Paris, France
- Born: 18 July 1962 (age 63) Rennes, France
- Height: 1.80 m (5 ft 11 in)
- Turned pro: 1978
- Retired: 1990 (continued to play sporadically)
- Plays: Left-handed (one-handed backhand)
- Prize money: $315,454

Singles
- Career record: 53–91
- Career titles: 0
- Highest ranking: No. 68 (27 November 1989)

Grand Slam singles results
- Australian Open: 3R (1988)
- French Open: 3R (1985, 1989)
- Wimbledon: 1R (1982, 1988)
- US Open: 2R (1982)

Doubles
- Career record: 28–47
- Career titles: 0
- Highest ranking: No. 140 (15 February 1988)

Jérôme Potier (French: [ʒeʁom pɔtje]; born 18 July 1962) is a French tennis coach and former professional player.

He was the coach of Josselin Ouanna, Marc Gicquel and Thierry Ascione.

== Career finals ==
=== Singles (2 runner-ups) ===
Result	W/L	Date	Tournament	Surface	Opponent	Score
Loss	0–1	Apr 1988	Nice, France	Clay	(France) Henri Leconte	2–6, 2–6
Loss	0–2	Apr 1989	Nice, France	Clay	(Soviet Union) Andrei Chesnokov	4–6, 4–6

=== Doubles (1 runner-up) ===
Result	W/L	Date	Tournament	Surface	Partner	Opponents	Score
Loss	0–1	May 1990	Bologna, Italy	Clay	(United States) Jim Pugh	(Argentina) Gustavo Luza (West Germany) Udo Riglewski	7–6, 4–6, 6–1
