= 2020 Hamburg European Open – Singles =

Singles
- 2020 Hamburg European Open

Final
- Champion: (Russia) Andrey Rublev
- Runner-up: (Greece) Stefanos Tsitsipas
- Score: 6–4, 3–6, 7–5

Details
- Draw: 32
- Seeds: 8

Events
Singles	Doubles
← 2019 ·	German Open Tennis Championships	· 2021 →

Nikoloz Basilashvili was the two-time defending champion, but lost in the first round to Roberto Bautista Agut.

Andrey Rublev won the title, his third of the 2020 season, defeating Stefanos Tsitsipas in the final, 6–4, 3–6, 7–5. Tsitsipas served for the championship at 5–4 in the third set.

== Seeds ==
1. (Russia) Daniil Medvedev (first round)
2. (Greece) Stefanos Tsitsipas (final)
3. (France) Gaël Monfils (first round)
4. (Spain) Roberto Bautista Agut (quarterfinals)
5. (Russia) Andrey Rublev (champion)
6. (Italy) Fabio Fognini (second round)
7. (Argentina) Diego Schwartzman (withdrew, still competing in Rome)
8. (Russia) Karen Khachanov (second round)

== Draw ==
=== Key ===
- Q = Qualifier
- WC = Wild card
- LL = Lucky loser
- Alt = Alternate
- SE = Special exempt
- PR = Protected ranking
- ITF = ITF entry
- JE = Junior exempt
- w/o = Walkover
- r = Retired
- d = Defaulted
- SR = Special ranking

=== Finals ===
Semifinals
(Norway) Casper Ruud	4	2
5	(Russia) Andrey Rublev	6	6
(Chile) Cristian Garín	5	6	4
2	(Greece) Stefanos Tsitsipas	7	3	6

Final
5	(Russia) Andrey Rublev	6	3	7
2	(Greece) Stefanos Tsitsipas	4	6	5

=== Top half ===
First round
1	(Russia) D Medvedev	4	3
(France) U Humbert	6	6
Q	(Czech Republic) J Veselý	7	6
LL	(France) G Simon	5	2
(Norway) C Ruud	6	2
(France) B Paire	4	0^{r}
WC	(Germany) P Kohlschreiber	6	1	5
6	(Italy) F Fognini	4	6	7
4	(Spain) R Bautista Agut	6	6
(Georgia (country)) N Basilashvili	4	3
(Japan) Y Nishioka	6^{0}	6	1
SE	(Germany) D Koepfer	7^{7}	4	6
Q	(United States) T Paul	6	0	6
PR	(South Africa) K Anderson	4	6	4
Q	(United States) T Sandgren	3	3
5	(Russia) A Rublev	6	6

Second round
(France) U Humbert	6	6
Q	(Czech Republic) J Veselý	4	3
(Norway) C Ruud	6	6
6	(Italy) F Fognini	3	3
4	(Spain) R Bautista Agut	6	3	6
SE	(Germany) D Koepfer	3	6	3
Q	(United States) T Paul	1	6	2
5	(Russia) A Rublev	6	3	6

Quarterfinals
(France) U Humbert	5	6	1
(Norway) C Ruud	7	3	6
4	(Spain) R Bautista Agut	2	5
5	(Russia) A Rublev	6	7

Semifinals
(Norway) C Ruud	4	2
5	(Russia) A Rublev	6	6

=== Bottom half ===
First round
LL	(Kazakhstan) A Bublik	6	7^{7}
(Spain) A Ramos Viñolas	2	6^{5}
(Italy) L Sonego	2	6^{2}
(Canada) F Auger-Aliassime	6	7^{7}
(Chile) C Garín	6	6
(Japan) K Nishikori	0	3
WC	(Germany) Y Hanfmann	6	6
3	(France) G Monfils	4	3
8/WC	(Russia) K Khachanov	7^{7}	4	7
(Germany) J-L Struff	6^{5}	6	5
(Serbia) D Lajović	6	6
(France) A Mannarino	4	1
(United States) T Fritz	4	2
Q	(Uruguay) P Cuevas	6	6
(United Kingdom) D Evans	3	1
2	(Greece) S Tsitsipas	6	6

Second round
LL	(Kazakhstan) A Bublik	6	6
(Canada) F Auger-Aliassime	4	2
(Chile) C Garín	6	7^{7}
WC	(Germany) Y Hanfmann	2	6^{3}
8/WC	(Russia) K Khachanov	1	2
(Serbia) D Lajović	6	6
Q	(Uruguay) P Cuevas	5	4
2	(Greece) S Tsitsipas	7	6

Quarterfinals
LL	(Kazakhstan) A Bublik	6	4	4
(Chile) C Garín	3	6	6
(Serbia) D Lajović	6^{5}	2
2	(Greece) S Tsitsipas	7^{7}	6

Semifinals
(Chile) C Garín	5	6	4
2	(Greece) S Tsitsipas	7	3	6

== Qualifying ==
=== Seeds ===
1. (United States) Tennys Sandgren (qualified)
2. (Japan) ~~Yoshihito Nishioka~~ (moved to main draw)
3. (France) Gilles Simon (qualifying competition, lucky loser)
4. (Kazakhstan) Alexander Bublik (qualifying competition, lucky loser)
5. (United States) Tommy Paul (qualified)
6. (Uruguay) Pablo Cuevas (qualified)
7. (Argentina) Juan Ignacio Londero (first round)
8. (Czech Republic) Jiří Veselý (qualified)

=== Qualifiers ===
1. (United States) Tennys Sandgren
2. (Czech Republic) Jiří Veselý
3. (Uruguay) Pablo Cuevas
4. (United States) Tommy Paul

=== Lucky losers ===
1. (France) Gilles Simon
2. (Kazakhstan) Alexander Bublik

=== Qualifying draw ===
==== First qualifier ====
First round
1	(United States) Tennys Sandgren	6	7^{7}
(Sweden) Mikael Ymer	3	6^{2}
(Moldova) Radu Albot	7^{7}	6
7	(Argentina) Juan Ignacio Londero	6^{5}	4

Qualifying competition
1	(United States) Tennys Sandgren	6	7^{7}
(Moldova) Radu Albot	1	6^{4}

==== Second qualifier ====
First round
Alt	(Austria) Lenny Hampel	6	7^{9}
WC	(Germany) Marvin Möller	2	6^{7}
WC	(Germany) Milan Welte	4	4
8	(Czech Republic) Jiří Veselý	6	6

Qualifying competition
Alt	(Austria) Lenny Hampel	4	0
8	(Czech Republic) Jiří Veselý	6	6

==== Third qualifier ====
First round
3	(France) Gilles Simon	6	6
WC	(Germany) Mats Rosenkranz	1	1
Alt	(Germany) Kevin Krawietz	6^{6}	6^{3}
6	(Uruguay) Pablo Cuevas	7^{8}	7^{7}

Qualifying competition
3	(France) Gilles Simon	4	6^{2}
6	(Uruguay) Pablo Cuevas	6	7^{7}

==== Fourth qualifier ====
First round
4	(Kazakhstan) Alexander Bublik	6	7
Alt	(Germany) Mats Moraing	2	5
(Portugal) João Sousa	1	3
5	(United States) Tommy Paul	6	6

Qualifying competition
4	(Kazakhstan) Alexander Bublik	4	4
5	(United States) Tommy Paul	6	6
