= 2020 Hamburg European Open =

- Date: 20–27 September
- Edition: 114th
- Category: ATP Tour 500
- Draw: 32S / 16D
- Surface: Clay / outdoor
- Location: Hamburg, Germany
- Venue: Am Rothenbaum

Champions

Singles
- (Russia) Andrey Rublev

Doubles
- (Australia) John Peers / (New Zealand) Michael Venus
- German Open Tennis Championships

The 2020 Hamburg European Open was a men's tennis tournament played on outdoor red clay courts. It was the 114th edition of the German Open Tennis Championships and part of the ATP Tour 500 series of the 2020 ATP Tour (called the Hamburg Open). Originally scheduled for 13 to 19 July 2020, but due to the ongoing COVID-19 pandemic, it was rescheduled from 20 to 27 September 2020 and took place at the Am Rothenbaum in Hamburg, Germany. Fifth-seeded Andrey Rublev won the singles title.

== Finals ==
=== Singles ===
- (Russia) Andrey Rublev defeated (Greece) Stefanos Tsitsipas, 6–4, 3–6, 7–5

=== Doubles ===
- (Australia) John Peers / (New Zealand) Michael Venus defeated (Croatia) Ivan Dodig / (Croatia) Mate Pavić, 6–3, 6–4

== Points and prize money ==
=== Points distribution ===
Event	W	F	SF	QF	Round of 16	Round of 32	Q	Q2	Q1
Singles	500	300	180	90	45	0	20	10	0
Doubles	500	300	180	90	0	—N/a	45	25	0

=== Prize money ===
Event	W	F	SF	QF	Round of 16	Round of 32	Q2	Q1
Singles	€354,845	€178,220	€89,925	€47,260	€23,620	€13,065	€5,025	€2,515
Doubles	€111,490	€54,570	€27,370	€14,040	€7,260	—N/a	—N/a	—N/a

== Singles main-draw entrants ==
=== Seeds ===
Country	Player	Rank^{1}	Seed
RUS	Daniil Medvedev	5	1
GRE	Stefanos Tsitsipas	6	2
FRA	Gaël Monfils	9	3
ESP	Roberto Bautista Agut	10	4
RUS	Andrey Rublev	12	5
ITA	Fabio Fognini	13	6
~~ARG~~	~~Diego Schwartzman~~	~~15~~	~~7~~
RUS	Karen Khachanov	16	8

- ^{1} Rankings as of September 14, 2020.

=== Other entrants ===
The following players received wildcards into the main draw:

- (Germany) Yannick Hanfmann
- (Russia) Karen Khachanov
- (Germany) Philipp Kohlschreiber

The following player received entry as a special exempt into the main draw:

- (Germany) Dominik Koepfer

The following player used a protected ranking into the main draw:

- (South Africa) Kevin Anderson

The following players received entry from the qualifying draw:

- (Uruguay) Pablo Cuevas
- (United States) Tommy Paul
- (United States) Tennys Sandgren
- (Czech Republic) Jiří Veselý

The following players received entry as a lucky loser:

- (Kazakhstan) Alexander Bublik
- (France) Gilles Simon

=== Withdrawals ===
- (Italy) Matteo Berrettini → replaced by (France) Ugo Humbert
- (Spain) Pablo Carreño Busta → replaced by (Norway) Casper Ruud
- (Australia) Alex de Minaur → replaced by (Germany) Jan-Lennard Struff
- (Belgium) David Goffin → replaced by (Spain) Albert Ramos Viñolas
- (Poland) Hubert Hurkacz → replaced by (Italy) Lorenzo Sonego
- (United States) John Isner → replaced by (France) Adrian Mannarino
- (Argentina) Diego Schwartzman → replaced by (Kazakhstan) Alexander Bublik
- (Canada) Denis Shapovalov → replaced by (France) Gilles Simon

=== Retirements ===
- (France) Benoît Paire (COVID-19)

== Doubles main-draw entrants ==
=== Seeds ===
Country	Player	Country	Player	Rank^{1}	Seed
COL	Juan Sebastián Cabal	COL	Robert Farah	3	1
USA	Rajeev Ram	GBR	Joe Salisbury	11	2
POL	Łukasz Kubot	BRA	Marcelo Melo	14	3
~~ESP~~	~~Marcel Granollers~~	~~ARG~~	~~Horacio Zeballos~~	~~21~~	~~4~~

- ^{1} Rankings as of September 14, 2020.

=== Other entrants ===
The following pairs received wildcards into the doubles main draw:

- (Germany) Yannick Hanfmann / (Germany) Mats Moraing
- (Denmark) Frederik Nielsen / (Germany) Tim Pütz

The following pair received entry from the qualifying draw:

- (Moldova) Radu Albot / (Pakistan) Aisam-ul-Haq Qureshi

The following pair received entry as lucky losers:

- (Germany) Marvin Möller / (Germany) Milan Welte

=== Withdrawals ===
- (Spain) Marcel Granollers / (Argentina) Horacio Zeballos → replaced by (Germany) Marvin Möller / (Germany) Milan Welte

=== Retirements ===
- (Colombia) Robert Farah / (Colombia) Juan Sebastián Cabal (COVID-19 reasons)
