= 2020 Hamburg European Open – Doubles =

Doubles
- 2020 Hamburg European Open

Final
- Champions: (Australia) John Peers (New Zealand) Michael Venus
- Runners-up: (Croatia) Ivan Dodig (Croatia) Mate Pavić
- Score: 6–3, 6–4

Details
- Draw: 16
- Seeds: 4

Events
Singles	Doubles
- German Open Tennis Championships

Oliver Marach and Jürgen Melzer were the defending champions, but Melzer chose not to participate this year. Marach played alongside Raven Klaasen, but lost in the first round to Kevin Krawietz and Andreas Mies.

John Peers and Michael Venus won the title, defeating Ivan Dodig and Mate Pavić in the final, 6–3, 6–4.

== Seeds ==
1. (Colombia) Juan Sebastián Cabal / (Colombia) Robert Farah (first round, retired)
2. (United States) Rajeev Ram / (United Kingdom) Joe Salisbury (first round)
3. (Poland) Łukasz Kubot / (Brazil) Marcelo Melo (quarterfinals)
4. (Spain) Marcel Granollers / (Argentina) Horacio Zeballos (withdrew)

== Draw ==
Key

- Q = Qualifier
- WC = Wild card
- LL = Lucky loser
- Alt = Alternate
- ITF = ITF entry
- PR = Protected ranking
- SR = Special ranking
- SE = Special exempt
- JE = Junior exempt
- JR = Junior Accelerator Programme entrant
- CO = College Accelerator Programme entrant
- NG = Next Gen Accelerator Program entrant
- w/o = Walkover
- r = Retired
- d = Defaulted

=== Draw ===
First round
1	(Colombia) JS Cabal (Colombia) R Farah	6^{r}
(Netherlands) J-J Rojer (Romania) H Tecău	6
WC	(Denmark) F Nielsen (Germany) T Pütz	5	5
(France) N Mahut (France) F Martin	7	7
3	(Poland) Ł Kubot (Brazil) M Melo	7^{8}	1	[10]
WC	(Germany) Y Hanfmann (Germany) M Moraing	6^{6}	6	[5]
(Italy) F Fognini (Finland) H Kontinen	1	4
(Australia) J Peers (New Zealand) M Venus	6	6
(United Kingdom) J Murray (United Kingdom) N Skupski	6	5	[8]
Q	(Moldova) R Albot (Pakistan) A-u-H Qureshi	0	7	[10]
(Croatia) I Dodig (Croatia) M Pavić	6	3	[10]
LL	(Germany) M Möller (Germany) M Welte	3	6	[6]
(Germany) K Krawietz (Germany) A Mies	7^{7}	6
(South Africa) R Klaasen (Austria) O Marach	6^{5}	3
(Netherlands) W Koolhof (Croatia) N Mektić	6	6^{0}	[12]
2	(United States) R Ram (United Kingdom) J Salisbury	4	7^{7}	[10]

Quarterfinals
(Netherlands) J-J Rojer (Romania) H Tecău	6	7
(France) N Mahut (France) F Martin	3	5
3	(Poland) Ł Kubot (Brazil) M Melo	1	2
(Australia) J Peers (New Zealand) M Venus	6	6
Q	(Moldova) R Albot (Pakistan) A-u-H Qureshi	4	2
(Croatia) I Dodig (Croatia) M Pavić	6	6
(Germany) K Krawietz (Germany) A Mies	3	5
(Netherlands) W Koolhof (Croatia) N Mektić	6	7

Semifinals
(Netherlands) J-J Rojer (Romania) H Tecău	6	5	[6]
(Australia) J Peers (New Zealand) M Venus	3	7	[10]
(Croatia) I Dodig (Croatia) M Pavić	6	6
(Netherlands) W Koolhof (Croatia) N Mektić	4	4

Final
(Australia) J Peers (New Zealand) M Venus	6	6
(Croatia) I Dodig (Croatia) M Pavić	3	4

== Qualifying ==
=== Seeds ===
1. (Brazil) Marcelo Demoliner / (Netherlands) Matwé Middelkoop (qualifying competition, withdrew)
2. (Moldova) Radu Albot / (Pakistan) Aisam-ul-Haq Qureshi (qualified)

=== Qualifiers ===
1. (Moldova) Radu Albot / (Pakistan) Aisam-ul-Haq Qureshi

=== Lucky losers ===
1. (Germany) Marvin Möller / (Germany) Milan Welte

=== Qualifying draw ===
First round
1	(Brazil) Marcelo Demoliner (Netherlands) Matwé Middelkoop	6	2	[10]
WC	(Germany) Marvin Möller (Germany) Milan Welte	1	6	[7]
(United States) Taylor Fritz (United States) Tommy Paul	4	7^{7}	[5]
2	(Moldova) Radu Albot (Pakistan) Aisam-ul-Haq Qureshi	6	6^{5}	[10]

Qualifying competition
1	(Brazil) Marcelo Demoliner (Netherlands) Matwé Middelkoop
2	(Moldova) Radu Albot (Pakistan) Aisam-ul-Haq Qureshi	w/o
