= 2019 Italian Open (tennis) =

- Date: 13–19 May
- Edition: 76th
- Draw: 56S / 32D (men); 56S / 28D (women)
- Prize money: €5,207,405 (men) €3,452,538 (women)
- Surface: Clay / outdoor
- Location: Rome, Italy
- Venue: Foro Italico

Champions

Men's singles
- (Spain) Rafael Nadal

Women's singles
- (Czech Republic) Karolína Plíšková

Men's doubles
- (Colombia) Juan Sebastián Cabal / (Colombia) Robert Farah

Women's doubles
- (Belarus) Victoria Azarenka / (Australia) Ashleigh Barty
← 2018 ·	Italian Open	· 2020 →

The 2019 Italian Open (also known as the Rome Masters or the Internazionali BNL d'Italia for sponsorship reasons) was a professional tennis tournament played on outdoor clay courts at the Foro Italico in Rome, Italy from 15 to 21 May 2019. It was the 76th edition of the Italian Open and was classified as an ATP Tour Masters 1000 event on the 2019 ATP Tour and a Premier 5 event on the 2019 WTA Tour.

== Finals ==
=== Men's singles ===
- (Spain) Rafael Nadal defeated (Serbia) Novak Djokovic, 6–0, 4–6, 6–1

=== Women's singles ===
- (Czech Republic) Karolína Plíšková defeated (United Kingdom) Johanna Konta, 6–3, 6–4

=== Men's doubles ===
- (Colombia) Juan Sebastián Cabal / (Colombia) Robert Farah defeated (South Africa) Raven Klaasen / (New Zealand) Michael Venus, 6–1, 6–3

=== Women's doubles ===
- (Belarus) Victoria Azarenka / (Australia) Ashleigh Barty defeated (Germany) Anna-Lena Grönefeld / (Netherlands) Demi Schuurs, 4–6, 6–0, [10–3]

== Points and prize money ==
=== Point distribution ===
Event	W	F	SF	QF	Round of 16	Round of 32	Round of 64	Q	Q2	Q1
Men's singles	1000	600	360	180	90	45	10	25	16	0
Men's doubles	1000	600	360	180	90	0	—	—	—	—
Women's singles	900	585	350	190	105	60	1	30	20	1
Women's doubles	900	585	350	190	105	1	—	—	—	—

=== Prize money ===
Event	W	F	SF	QF	Round of 16	Round of 32	Round of 64	Q2	Q1
Men's singles	€958,055	€484,950	€248,745	€128,200	€64,225	€33,635	€18,955	€7,255	€3,630
Women's singles	€523,858	€261,802	€130,774	€60,240	€29,866	€15,330	€7,879	€4,385	€2,256
Men's doubles	€284,860	€139,020	€69,680	€35,510	€18,730	€10,020	—	—	—
Women's doubles	€149,965	€75,744	€37,491	€18,872	€9,532	€4,474	—	—	—

== ATP singles main-draw entrants ==
=== Seeds ===
The following are the seeded players. Seedings are based on ATP rankings as of 6 May 2019. Rankings and points before are as of 13 May 2019.

Seed	Rank	Player	Points before	Points defending	Points won	Points after	Status
1	1	(Serbia) Novak Djokovic	12,115	360	600	12,355	Runner-up, lost to (Spain) Rafael Nadal [2]
2	2	(Spain) Rafael Nadal	7,945	1,000	1,000	7,945	Champion, defeated (Serbia) Novak Djokovic [1]
3	3	(Switzerland) Roger Federer	5,770	0	180	5,950	Quarterfinals withdrew due to right leg injury
4	5	(Germany) Alexander Zverev	4,745	600	10	4,155	Second round lost to (Italy) Matteo Berrettini [WC]
5	4	(Austria) Dominic Thiem	4,845	10	10	4,845	Second round lost to (Spain) Fernando Verdasco
6	6	(Japan) Kei Nishikori	3,860	180	180	3,860	Quarterfinals lost to (Argentina) Diego Schwartzman
7	9	(Argentina) Juan Martín del Potro	3,145	90	180	3,235	Quarterfinals lost to (Serbia) Novak Djokovic [1]
8	7	(Greece) Stefanos Tsitsipas	3,790	70	360	4,080	Semifinals lost to (Spain) Rafael Nadal [2]
9	10	(Croatia) Marin Čilić	3,025	360	45	2,710	Second round lost to (Germany) Jan-Lennard Struff
10	12	(Italy) Fabio Fognini	2,920	180	90	2,830	Third round lost to (Greece) Stefanos Tsitsipas [8]
11	13	(Russia) Karen Khachanov	2,720	10	90	2,800	Third round lost to (Spain) Fernando Verdasco
12	14	(Russia) Daniil Medvedev	2,625	10	10	2,625	First round lost to (Australia) Nick Kyrgios
13	15	(Croatia) Borna Ćorić	2,445	10	90	2,525	Third round lost to (Switzerland) Roger Federer [3]
14	18	(Georgia (country)) Nikoloz Basilashvili	1,905	70	90	1,925	Third round lost to (Spain) Rafael Nadal [2]
15	16	(France) Gaël Monfils	1,965	10	10	1,965	First round lost to (Spain) Albert Ramos Viñolas [Q]
16	19	(Italy) Marco Cecchinato	1,875	45	45	1,875	Second round lost to (Germany) Philipp Kohlschreiber

The following players would have been seeded, but they withdrew from the event.

Rank	Player	Points before	Points defending	Points after	Reason
8	(South Africa) Kevin Anderson	3,755	10	3,745	Right elbow injury
11	(United States) John Isner	2,950	10	2,940	Left foot injury
17	(Canada) Milos Raonic	1,960	0	1,960	Right knee injury

=== Other entrants ===
The following players received wildcards into the main draw:

- (Italy) Andrea Basso
- (Italy) Matteo Berrettini
- (Italy) Jannik Sinner
- (Italy) Lorenzo Sonego

The following player received entry using a protected ranking into the main draw:

- (France) Jo-Wilfried Tsonga

The following players received entry from the qualifying draw:

- (United Kingdom) Dan Evans
- (United States) Taylor Fritz
- (Japan) Yoshihito Nishioka
- (United Kingdom) Cameron Norrie
- (France) Benoît Paire
- (Spain) Albert Ramos Viñolas
- (Norway) Casper Ruud

=== Withdrawals ===
Before the tournament

- (South Africa) Kevin Anderson → replaced by (Kazakhstan) Mikhail Kukushkin
- (United States) John Isner → replaced by (Moldova) Radu Albot
- (Canada) Milos Raonic → replaced by (Germany) Jan-Lennard Struff

During the tournament

- (Switzerland) Roger Federer

== ATP doubles main-draw entrants ==
=== Seeds ===
Country	Player	Country	Player	Rank^{1}	Seed
POL	Łukasz Kubot	BRA	Marcelo Melo	11	1
GBR	Jamie Murray	BRA	Bruno Soares	17	2
COL	Juan Sebastián Cabal	COL	Robert Farah	20	3
CRO	Nikola Mektić	CRO	Franko Škugor	23	4
AUT	Oliver Marach	CRO	Mate Pavić	25	5
RSA	Raven Klaasen	NZL	Michael Venus	29	6
USA	Bob Bryan	USA	Mike Bryan	31	7
FIN	Henri Kontinen	AUS	John Peers	35	8

- Rankings are as of May 6, 2019.

=== Other entrants ===
The following pairs received wildcards into the doubles main draw:

- (Italy) Filippo Baldi / (Italy) Andrea Pellegrino
- (Italy) Simone Bolelli / (Italy) Andreas Seppi
- (Italy) Marco Cecchinato / (Italy) Lorenzo Sonego

The following pair received entry as alternates:

- (United States) Austin Krajicek / (New Zealand) Artem Sitak

=== Withdrawals ===
Before the tournament

- (Italy) Fabio Fognini
- (France) Lucas Pouille

During the tournament

- (Argentina) Diego Schwartzman

== WTA singles main-draw entrants ==
=== Seeds ===
Country	Player	Rank^{1}	Seed
JPN	Naomi Osaka	1	1
CZE	Petra Kvitová	2	2
ROU	Simona Halep	3	3
CZE	Karolína Plíšková	5	4
UKR	Elina Svitolina	6	5
NED	Kiki Bertens	7	6
USA	Sloane Stephens	8	7
AUS	Ashleigh Barty	9	8
BLR	Aryna Sabalenka	10	9
USA	Serena Williams	11	10
DEN	Caroline Wozniacki	12	11
LAT	Anastasija Sevastova	13	12
USA	Madison Keys	14	13
EST	Anett Kontaveit	15	14
CHN	Wang Qiang	16	15
GER	Julia Görges	17	16

- Rankings are as of May 6, 2019.

=== Other entrants ===
The following players received wildcards into the main draw:

- (Belarus) Victoria Azarenka
- (Italy) Elisabetta Cocciaretto
- (Italy) Sara Errani
- (Italy) Jasmine Paolini
- (United States) Venus Williams

The following players received entry from the qualifying draw:

- (Germany) Mona Barthel
- (Romania) Irina-Camelia Begu
- (France) Alizé Cornet
- (Slovenia) Polona Hercog
- (France) Kristina Mladenovic
- (Sweden) Rebecca Peterson
- (Greece) Maria Sakkari
- (Slovenia) Tamara Zidanšek

The following player received entry as a lucky loser:

- (United States) Amanda Anisimova

=== Withdrawals ===
Before the tournament

- (Canada) Bianca Andreescu → replaced by (United Kingdom) Johanna Konta
- (Italy) Camila Giorgi → replaced by (Czech Republic) Barbora Strýcová
- (Germany) Angelique Kerber → replaced by (United States) Alison Riske
- (Russia) Maria Sharapova → replaced by (Slovakia) Viktória Kužmová
- (Croatia) Donna Vekić → replaced by (United States) Amanda Anisimova

During the tournament

- (Japan) Naomi Osaka (right hand injury)
- (United States) Serena Williams (left knee injury)

=== Retirements ===
- (France) Alizé Cornet (right thigh injury)
- (Germany) Julia Görges (right thigh injury)
- (Czech Republic) Petra Kvitová (left calf injury)
- (Spain) Garbiñe Muguruza (left thigh injury)
- (Latvia) Jeļena Ostapenko (viral illness)
- (Denmark) Caroline Wozniacki (left lower leg injury)

== WTA doubles main-draw entrants ==
=== Seeds ===
Country	Player	Country	Player	Rank^{1}	Seed
CZE	Barbora Krejčíková	CZE	Kateřina Siniaková	3	1
USA	Nicole Melichar	CZE	Květa Peschke	25	2
AUS	Samantha Stosur	CHN	Zhang Shuai	28	3
BEL	Elise Mertens	BLR	Aryna Sabalenka	29	4
TPE	Hsieh Su-wei	CZE	Barbora Strýcová	30	5
CAN	Gabriela Dabrowski	CHN	Xu Yifan	30	6
TPE	Chan Hao-ching	TPE	Latisha Chan	32	7
GER	Anna-Lena Grönefeld	NED	Demi Schuurs	35	8

- Rankings are as of May 6, 2019.

=== Other entrants ===
The following pairs received wildcards into the doubles main draw:

- (Italy) Deborah Chiesa / (Italy) Jasmine Paolini
- (Italy) Sara Errani / (Italy) Martina Trevisan
- (Italy) Anastasia Grymalska / (Italy) Giorgia Marchetti

=== Withdrawals ===
During the tournament

- (Russia) Anastasia Pavlyuchenkova (unspecified reasons)
