= Srpska Open =

Defunct tennis tournament
- Tour: ATP World Tour
- Founded: 2023
- Abolished: 2023
- Editions: 1
- Location: Banja Luka; Bosnia and Herzegovina
- Venue: Tenis Klub Mladost, National tennis complex
- Category: ATP 250
- Surface: Clay / Outdoors
- Draw: 28S / 16Q / 16D
- Prize money: €562,815
- Website: srpskaopen.org

Current champions (2023)
- Singles: (Serbia) Dušan Lajović
- Doubles: (United Kingdom) Jamie Murray / (New Zealand) Michael Venus

The Srpska Open (Note: Српска опен / Srpska open) was a men's ATP Tour 250 series tournament played on outdoor clay. It was held once in 2023, as part of the ATP Tour, in Banja Luka, Bosnia and Herzegovina.

== Finals ==
=== Singles ===
Year	Champions	Runners-up	Score
2023	(Serbia) Dušan Lajović	(Note: Competed under no nationality due to the Russian invasion of Ukraine.) Andrey Rublev	6–3, 4–6, 6–4

=== Doubles ===
Year	Champions	Runners-up	Score
2023	(United Kingdom) Jamie Murray (New Zealand) Michael Venus	(Portugal) Francisco Cabral (Kazakhstan) Aleksandr Nedovyesov	7–5, 6–2
