= 2019 Italian Open – Women's doubles =

Women's doubles
- 2019 Italian Open

Final
- Champions: (Belarus) Victoria Azarenka (Australia) Ashleigh Barty
- Runners-up: (Germany) Anna-Lena Grönefeld (Netherlands) Demi Schuurs
- Score: 4–6, 6–0, [10–3]

Details
- Draw: 28
- Seeds: 8

Events
| Singles | men | women |
| Doubles | men | women |
| ← 2018 · | Italian Open | · 2020 → |

Ashleigh Barty and Demi Schuurs were the defending champions, but chose not to participate together. Barty played alongside Victoria Azarenka and successfully defended the title, defeating Schuurs and Anna-Lena Grönefeld in the final, 4–6, 6–0, [10–3].

== Seeds ==
The top four seeds received a bye into the second round.

1. (Czech Republic) Barbora Krejčíková / (Czech Republic) Kateřina Siniaková (semifinals)
2. (United States) Nicole Melichar / (Czech Republic) Květa Peschke (second round)
3. (Australia) Samantha Stosur / (China) Zhang Shuai (quarterfinals)
4. (Belgium) Elise Mertens / (Belarus) Aryna Sabalenka (second round)
5. (Chinese Taipei) Hsieh Su-wei / (Czech Republic) Barbora Strýcová (second round)
6. (Canada) Gabriela Dabrowski / (China) Xu Yifan (second round)
7. (Chinese Taipei) Chan Hao-ching / (Chinese Taipei) Latisha Chan (semifinals)
8. (Germany) Anna-Lena Grönefeld / (Netherlands) Demi Schuurs (final)

== Draw ==
=== Key ===
- Q = Qualifier
- WC = Wild card
- LL = Lucky loser
- Alt = Alternate
- ITF = ITF entry
- PR = Protected ranking
- SR = Special ranking
- SE = Special exempt
- JE = Junior exempt
- JR = Junior Accelerator Programme entrant
- CO = College Accelerator Programme entrant
- NG = Next Gen Accelerator Program entrant
- w/o = Walkover
- r = Retired
- d = Defaulted

=== Finals ===
Semifinals
1 | (Czech Republic) Barbora Krejčíková (Czech Republic) Kateřina Siniaková | 4 | 4
(Belarus) Victoria Azarenka (Australia) Ashleigh Barty | 6 | 6
7 | (Chinese Taipei) Chan Hao-ching (Chinese Taipei) Latisha Chan | 5 | 7^{8} | [3]
8 | (Germany) Anna-Lena Grönefeld (Netherlands) Demi Schuurs | 7 | 6^{6} | [10]

Final
(Belarus) Victoria Azarenka (Australia) Ashleigh Barty | 4 | 6 | [10]
8 | (Germany) Anna-Lena Grönefeld (Netherlands) Demi Schuurs | 6 | 0 | [3]

=== Top half ===
First round
(Spain) MJ Martínez Sánchez (Spain) S Sorribes Tormo | 5 | 6^{5}
(Russia) V Kudermetova (Russia) V Zvonareva | 7 | 7^{7}
(Japan) S Aoyama (Belarus) L Marozava | 6 | 6
(United States) K Christian (Russia) A Panova | 3 | 4
WC | (Italy) D Chiesa (Italy) J Paolini | 6^{3} | 2
6 | (Canada) G Dabrowski (China) Y Xu | 7^{7} | 6
(Belarus) A Sasnovich (Ukraine) L Tsurenko | 7^{7} | 7
WC | (Italy) A Grymalska (Italy) G Marchetti | 6^{4} | 5
(Belarus) V Azarenka (Australia) A Barty | 7 | 6
(Japan) M Kato (Australia) J Moore | 5 | 2
(United States) D Krawczyk (Japan) M Ninomiya | 4 | 1
5 | (Chinese Taipei) S-w Hsieh (Czech Republic) B Strýcová | 6 | 6

Second round
1 | (Czech Republic) B Krejčíková (Czech Republic) K Siniaková | 1 | 6 | [10]
(Russia) V Kudermetova (Russia) V Zvonareva | 6 | 3 | [7]
(Japan) S Aoyama (Belarus) L Marozava | 6 | 6^{5} | [10]
6 | (Canada) G Dabrowski (China) Y Xu | 2 | 7^{7} | [8]
4 | (Belgium) E Mertens (Belarus) A Sabalenka | 3 | 2
(Belarus) A Sasnovich (Ukraine) L Tsurenko | 6 | 6
(Belarus) V Azarenka (Australia) A Barty | 6 | 6
5 | (Chinese Taipei) S-w Hsieh (Czech Republic) B Strýcová | 4 | 3

Quarterfinals
1 | (Czech Republic) B Krejčíková (Czech Republic) K Siniaková | 6 | 7
(Japan) S Aoyama (Belarus) L Marozava | 4 | 5
(Belarus) A Sasnovich (Ukraine) L Tsurenko | 2 | 4
(Belarus) V Azarenka (Australia) A Barty | 6 | 6

Semifinals
1 | (Czech Republic) B Krejčíková (Czech Republic) K Siniaková | 4 | 4
(Belarus) V Azarenka (Australia) A Barty | 6 | 6

=== Bottom half ===
First round
7 | (Chinese Taipei) H-c Chan (Chinese Taipei) L Chan | 3 | 6 | [10]
(Croatia) D Jurak (Romania) R Olaru | 6 | 0 | [5]
(Romania) I-C Begu (Romania) M Buzărnescu | 2 | 4
(Russia) A Pavlyuchenkova (Latvia) A Sevastova | 6 | 6
(United States) R Atawo (Slovenia) K Srebotnik | 3 | 3
(Poland) A Rosolska (China) Z Yang | 6 | 6
8 | (Germany) A-L Grönefeld (Netherlands) D Schuurs | 4 | 6 | [10]
(Ukraine) L Kichenok (Latvia) J Ostapenko | 6 | 4 | [7]
(Germany) J Görges (Czech Republic) Ka Plíšková | 6^{5} | 6^{4}
(Ukraine) N Kichenok (United States) A Spears | 7^{7} | 7^{7}
(Slovenia) A Klepač (Serbia) A Krunić | 6 | 6
WC | (Italy) S Errani (Italy) M Trevisan | 3 | 1

Second round
7 | (Chinese Taipei) H-c Chan (Chinese Taipei) L Chan | w/o
(Russia) A Pavlyuchenkova (Latvia) A Sevastova
(Poland) A Rosolska (China) Z Yang | 6 | 2 | [6]
3 | (Australia) S Stosur (China) S Zhang | 2 | 6 | [10]
8 | (Germany) A-L Grönefeld (Netherlands) D Schuurs | 6 | 6
(Ukraine) N Kichenok (United States) A Spears | 1 | 2
(Slovenia) A Klepač (Serbia) A Krunić | 3 | 7 | [14]
2 | (United States) N Melichar (Czech Republic) K Peschke | 6 | 5 | [12]

Quarterfinals
7 | (Chinese Taipei) H-c Chan (Chinese Taipei) L Chan | 5 | 7^{7} | [10]
3 | (Australia) S Stosur (China) S Zhang | 7 | 6^{4} | [7]
8 | (Germany) A-L Grönefeld (Netherlands) D Schuurs | 6 | 6
(Slovenia) A Klepač (Serbia) A Krunić | 3 | 0

Semifinals
7 | (Chinese Taipei) H-c Chan (Chinese Taipei) L Chan | 5 | 7^{8} | [3]
8 | (Germany) A-L Grönefeld (Netherlands) D Schuurs | 7 | 6^{6} | [10]
