= 2023 Srpska Open =

ATP tennis tournament

- Date: 17–23 April
- Edition: 1st
- Category: ATP Tour 250
- Draw: 28S / 16D
- Prize money: €562,815
- Surface: Clay / Outdoors
- Location: Banja Luka, Bosnia and Herzegovina
- Venue: Tenis Klub Mladost, National tennis complex

Champions

Singles
- (Serbia) Dušan Lajović

Doubles
- (United Kingdom) Jamie Murray / (New Zealand) Michael Venus
- Srpska Open

The 2023 Srpska Open was a men's tennis tournament played on outdoor clay courts. It was the first edition of the event and part of the ATP Tour 250 series on the ATP Tour. It took place from 17 to 23 April 2023 at the National tennis complex in Banja Luka, Bosnia and Herzegovina.

It replaced the Serbia Open for one year as the Djokovic family prepared the Serbian venue in order to apply for an ATP 500 status.

== Finals ==
=== Singles ===
- (Serbia) Dušan Lajović def Andrey Rublev 6–3, 4–6, 6–4

=== Doubles ===
- (United Kingdom) Jamie Murray / (New Zealand) Michael Venus def. (Portugal) Francisco Cabral / (Kazakhstan) Aleksandr Nedovyesov, 7–5, 6–2

== Points and prize money ==
=== Point distribution ===
Event	W	F	SF	QF	Round of 16	Round of 32	Q	Q2	Q1
Singles	250	150	90	45	20	0	12	6	0
Doubles	250	150	90	45	0	—N/a	—N/a	—N/a	—N/a

=== Prize money ===
Event	W	F	SF	QF	Round of 16	Round of 32	Q2	Q1
Singles	€85,605	€49,940	€29,355	€17,010	€9,880	€6,035	€3,020	€1,645
Doubles*	€29,740	€15,910	€9,330	€5,220	€3,070	—N/a	—N/a	—N/a

_{*per team}

== Singles main draw entrants ==
=== Seeds ===
Country	Player	Rank	Seed
SRB	Novak Djokovic	1	1
RUS	Andrey Rublev	6	2
CRO	Borna Ćorić	20	3
SRB	Miomir Kecmanović	34	4
NED	Tallon Griekspoor	35	5
CZE	Jiří Lehečka	42	6
FRA	Richard Gasquet	43	7
FRA	Grégoire Barrère	57	8

- Rankings are as of 10 April 2023.

=== Other entrants ===
The following players received wildcards into the main draw:

- (Bosnia and Herzegovina) Damir Džumhur
- (Serbia) Hamad Međedović
- (France) Gaël Monfils

The following players received entry from the qualifying draw:

- (Moldova) Radu Albot
- (Croatia) Dino Prižmić
- (Jordan) Abdullah Shelbayh
- (Sweden) Elias Ymer

The following player received entry as a lucky loser:

- (United Kingdom) Liam Broady

=== Withdrawals ===
- (France) Benjamin Bonzi → replaced by (France) Hugo Gaston
- (Italy) Marco Cecchinato → replaced by (United Kingdom) Liam Broady
- (Italy) Fabio Fognini → replaced by (Japan) Taro Daniel

== Doubles main draw entrants ==
=== Seeds ===
Country	Player	Country	Player	Rank	Seed
GBR	Jamie Murray	NZL	Michael Venus	44	1
BEL	Sander Gillé	BEL	Joran Vliegen	89	2
FRA	Sadio Doumbia	FRA	Fabien Reboul	101	3
COL	Nicolás Barrientos	URU	Ariel Behar	113	4

- Rankings are as of 10 April 2023.

=== Other entrants ===
The following pairs received wildcards into the doubles main draw:

- ~~(Italy) Marco Cecchinato~~ / ~~(Serbia) Nenad Zimonjić~~
- (Serbia) Ivan Sabanov / (Serbia) Matej Sabanov

The following pairs received entry as alternates:

- (Kazakhstan) Andrey Golubev / (Ukraine) Denys Molchanov
- (Bosnia and Herzegovina) Aldin Šetkić / (Australia) Jason Taylor

=== Withdrawals ===
- (Bosnia and Herzegovina) Tomislav Brkić / (Ecuador) Gonzalo Escobar → replaced by (Ecuador) Gonzalo Escobar / (Ecuador) Diego Hidalgo
- (Italy) Marco Cecchinato / (Serbia) Nenad Zimonjić → replaced by (Kazakhstan) Andrey Golubev / (Ukraine) Denys Molchanov
- (Argentina) Federico Coria / (Bolivia) Hugo Dellien → replaced by (Pakistan) Aisam-ul-Haq Qureshi / (United States) Hunter Reese
- Andrey Rublev / Roman Safiullin → replaced by (Bosnia and Herzegovina) Aldin Šetkić / (Australia) Jason Taylor
