= 2019 Italian Open – Men's singles =

Men's singles
- 2019 Italian Open

Final
- Champion: (Spain) Rafael Nadal
- Runner-up: (Serbia) Novak Djokovic
- Score: 6–0, 4–6, 6–1

Details
- Draw: 56 (7 Q / 4 WC )
- Seeds: 16

Events
Singles	men	women
Doubles	men	women
- Italian Open

Defending champion Rafael Nadal defeated Novak Djokovic in the final, 6–0, 4–6, 6–1 to win the men's singles tennis title at the 2019 Italian Open. It was his record-extending ninth Italian Open title and record 34th Masters 1000 title. It was the pair's fifth meeting in the Italian Open final (following 2009, 2011, 2012, and 2014).

Nick Kyrgios was defaulted from his second-round match after multiple penalties for unsportsmanlike conduct. As a result, he forfeited all points and prize money earned from the event.

== Seeds ==
The top eight seeds receive a bye into the second round.

1. (Serbia) Novak Djokovic (final)
2. (Spain) Rafael Nadal (champion)
3. (Switzerland) Roger Federer (quarterfinals, withdrew)
4. (Germany) Alexander Zverev (second round)
5. (Austria) Dominic Thiem (second round)
6. (Japan) Kei Nishikori (quarterfinals)
7. (Argentina) Juan Martín del Potro (quarterfinals)
8. (Greece) Stefanos Tsitsipas (semifinals)

9. (Croatia) Marin Čilić (second round)
10. (Italy) Fabio Fognini (third round)
11. (Russia) Karen Khachanov (third round)
12. (Russia) Daniil Medvedev (first round)
13. (Croatia) Borna Ćorić (third round)
14. (Georgia (country)) Nikoloz Basilashvili (third round)
15. (France) Gaël Monfils (first round)
16. (Italy) Marco Cecchinato (second round)

Click on the seed number of a player to go to their draw section.

== Draw ==
Key

- Q = Qualifier
- WC = Wild card
- LL = Lucky loser
- Alt = Alternate
- ITF = ITF entry
- PR = Protected ranking
- SR = Special ranking
- SE = Special exempt
- JE = Junior exempt
- JR = Junior Accelerator Programme entrant
- CO = College Accelerator Programme entrant
- NG = Next Gen Accelerator Program entrant
- w/o = Walkover
- r = Retired
- d = Defaulted

=== Finals ===
Quarterfinals
1	(Serbia) Novak Djokovic	4	7^{8}	6
7	(Argentina) Juan Martín del Potro	6	6^{6}	4
(Argentina) Diego Schwartzman	6	6
6	(Japan) Kei Nishikori	4	2
8	(Greece) Stefanos Tsitsipas	w/o
3	(Switzerland) Roger Federer
(Spain) Fernando Verdasco	4	0
2	(Spain) Rafael Nadal	6	6

Semifinals
1	(Serbia) Novak Djokovic	6	6^{2}	6
(Argentina) Diego Schwartzman	3	7^{7}	3
8	(Greece) Stefanos Tsitsipas	3	4
2	(Spain) Rafael Nadal	6	6

Final
1	(Serbia) Novak Djokovic	0	6	1
2	(Spain) Rafael Nadal	6	4	6

=== Top half ===
==== Section 1 ====
First round
(Spain) P Carreño Busta	3	6^{5}
(Canada) D Shapovalov	6	7^{7}
(Germany) P Kohlschreiber	6	3	6
(France) G Simon	2	6	3
(Australia) A de Minaur	6	3	1
16	(Italy) M Cecchinato	4	6	6
12	(Russia) D Medvedev	3	6	3
(Australia) N Kyrgios	6	3	6
Q	(Norway) C Ruud	7	0	6
Q	(United Kingdom) D Evans	5	6	3
(Belgium) D Goffin	4	6	6
(Switzerland) S Wawrinka	6	0	2

Second round
1	(Serbia) N Djokovic	6	6
(Canada) D Shapovalov	1	3
(Germany) P Kohlschreiber	6	6
16	(Italy) M Cecchinato	3	3
(Australia) N Kyrgios	3	7^{7}	1^{d}
Q	(Norway) C Ruud	6	6^{5}	2
(Belgium) D Goffin	4	2
7	(Argentina) JM del Potro	6	6

Third round
1	(Serbia) N Djokovic	6	6
(Germany) P Kohlschreiber	3	0
Q	(Norway) C Ruud	4	4
7	(Argentina) JM del Potro	6	6

Quarterfinals
1	(Serbia) N Djokovic	4	7^{8}	6
7	(Argentina) JM del Potro	6	6^{6}	4

==== Section 2 ====
First round
WC	(Italy) M Berrettini	6	6
(France) L Pouille	2	4
(Argentina) D Schwartzman	6	6
Q	(Japan) Y Nishioka	1	4
Q	(Spain) A Ramos Viñolas	6	6
15	(France) G Monfils	3	1
9	(Croatia) M Čilić	6	7
WC	(Italy) A Basso	1	5
(Bulgaria) G Dimitrov	4	7^{7}	3
(Germany) J-L Struff	6	6^{5}	6
Q	(United States) T Fritz	6	6
(Argentina) G Pella	3	4

Second round
4	(Germany) A Zverev	5	5
WC	(Italy) M Berrettini	7	7
(Argentina) D Schwartzman	7^{7}	6
Q	(Spain) A Ramos Viñolas	6^{5}	1
9	(Croatia) M Čilić	2	3
(Germany) J-L Struff	6	6
Q	(United States) T Fritz	2	4
6	(Japan) K Nishikori	6	6

Third round
WC	(Italy) M Berrettini	3	4
(Argentina) D Schwartzman	6	6
(Germany) J-L Struff	6	6^{2}	3
6	(Japan) K Nishikori	3	7^{7}	6

Quarterfinals
(Argentina) D Schwartzman	6	6
6	(Japan) K Nishikori	4	2

=== Bottom half ===
==== Section 3 ====
First round
(United States) S Johnson	6	1	5
WC	(Italy) J Sinner	1	6	7
(Moldova) R Albot	6	6
Q	(France) B Paire	3	2
PR	(France) J-W Tsonga	3	4
10	(Italy) F Fognini	6	6
13	(Croatia) B Ćorić	6^{4}	6	6
(Canada) F Auger-Aliassime	7^{7}	3	4
(Australia) J Millman	6	3	4
Q	(United Kingdom) C Norrie	3	6	6
(United States) F Tiafoe	3	7^{7}	6^{4}
(Portugal) J Sousa	6	6^{3}	7^{7}

Second round
8	(Greece) S Tsitsipas	6	6
WC	(Italy) J Sinner	3	2
(Moldova) R Albot	6^{6}	3
10	(Italy) F Fognini	7^{8}	6
13	(Croatia) B Ćorić	6	6
Q	(United Kingdom) C Norrie	2	2
(Portugal) J Sousa	4	3
3	(Switzerland) R Federer	6	6

Third round
8	(Greece) S Tsitsipas	6	6
10	(Italy) F Fognini	4	3
13	(Croatia) B Ćorić	6	4	6^{7}
3	(Switzerland) R Federer	2	6	7^{9}

Quarterfinals
8	(Greece) S Tsitsipas	w/o
3	(Switzerland) R Federer

==== Section 4 ====
First round
(Spain) F Verdasco	4	6	6
(United Kingdom) K Edmund	6	4	2
(Spain) R Bautista Agut	6	3	6
(Italy) A Seppi	1	6	1
WC	(Italy) L Sonego	3	7^{7}	3
11	(Russia) K Khachanov	6	6^{1}	6
14	(Georgia (country)) N Basilashvili	6	7^{7}
(Hungary) M Fucsovics	1	6^{2}
(Kazakhstan) M Kukushkin	3	4
(Serbia) L Đere	6	6
(France) R Gasquet	1	6	3
(France) J Chardy	6	4	6

Second round
5	(Austria) D Thiem	6	4	5
(Spain) F Verdasco	4	6	7
(Spain) R Bautista Agut	7	4	2
11	(Russia) K Khachanov	5	6	6
14	(Georgia (country)) N Basilashvili	7	6
(Serbia) L Đere	5	4
(France) J Chardy	0	1
2	(Spain) R Nadal	6	6

Third round
(Spain) F Verdasco	7	3	6
11	(Russia) K Khachanov	5	6	3
14	(Georgia (country)) N Basilashvili	1	0
2	(Spain) R Nadal	6	6

Quarterfinals
(Spain) F Verdasco	4	0
2	(Spain) R Nadal	6	6

== Qualifying ==
=== Seeds ===
1. (Serbia) Dušan Lajović (qualifying competition)
2. (France) Benoît Paire (qualified)
3. (United Kingdom) Cameron Norrie (qualified)
4. (Poland) Hubert Hurkacz (first round)
5. (Bosnia and Herzegovina) Damir Džumhur (qualifying competition)
6. (Spain) Jaume Munar (first round)
7. (United States) Taylor Fritz (qualified)
8. (United States) Reilly Opelka (qualifying competition)
9. (Slovakia) Martin Kližan (first round)
10. (Netherlands) Robin Haase (first round)
11. (Japan) Yoshihito Nishioka (qualified)
12. (Norway) Casper Ruud (qualified)
13. (Chile) Nicolás Jarry (qualifying competition)
14. (Australia) Bernard Tomic (qualifying competition)

=== Qualifiers ===
1. (United Kingdom) Dan Evans
2. (France) Benoît Paire
3. (United Kingdom) Cameron Norrie
4. (Norway) Casper Ruud
5. (Japan) Yoshihito Nishioka
6. (Spain) Albert Ramos Viñolas
7. (United States) Taylor Fritz

=== Qualifying draw ===
==== First qualifier ====
First round
1	(Serbia) Dušan Lajović	7^{7}	6^{3}	6
(Slovenia) Aljaž Bedene	6^{5}	7^{7}	1
(United Kingdom) Dan Evans	6	6
10	(Netherlands) Robin Haase	2	4

Qualifying competition
1	(Serbia) Dušan Lajović	5	3
(United Kingdom) Dan Evans	7	6

==== Second qualifier ====
First round
2	(France) Benoît Paire	6	6
Alt	(United States) Bradley Klahn	4	2
(Latvia) Ernests Gulbis	6^{6}	3
8	(United States) Reilly Opelka	7^{8}	6

Qualifying competition
2	(France) Benoît Paire	5	6	7^{7}
8	(United States) Reilly Opelka	7	2	6^{5}

==== Third qualifier ====
First round
3	(United Kingdom) Cameron Norrie	6^{5}	7	6
(Germany) Peter Gojowczyk	7^{7}	5	3
(Romania) Marius Copil	6^{4}	2
13	(Chile) Nicolás Jarry	7^{7}	6

Qualifying competition
3	(United Kingdom) Cameron Norrie	6	4	7^{8}
13	(Chile) Nicolás Jarry	3	6	6^{6}

==== Fourth qualifier ====
First round
4	(Poland) Hubert Hurkacz	3	6	4
(Serbia) Miomir Kecmanović	6	1	6
WC	(Italy) Lorenzo Musetti	1	4
12	(Norway) Casper Ruud	6	6

Qualifying competition
(Serbia) Miomir Kecmanović	2	1
12	(Norway) Casper Ruud	6	6

==== Fifth qualifier ====
First round
5	(Bosnia and Herzegovina) Damir Džumhur	6	6
(Japan) Taro Daniel	0	3
(United States) Denis Kudla	6^{3}	6	3
11	(Japan) Yoshihito Nishioka	7^{7}	4	6

Qualifying competition
5	(Bosnia and Herzegovina) Damir Džumhur	4	6	3
11	(Japan) Yoshihito Nishioka	6	4	6

==== Sixth qualifier ====
First round
6	(Spain) Jaume Munar	7^{7}	3	6^{4}
(Spain) Albert Ramos Viñolas	6^{2}	6	7^{7}
WC	(Italy) Riccardo Balzerani	1	4
14	(Australia) Bernard Tomic	6	6

Qualifying competition
(Spain) Albert Ramos Viñolas	7^{7}	7
14	(Australia) Bernard Tomic	6^{4}	5

==== Seventh qualifier ====
First round
7	(United States) Taylor Fritz	6	6
WC	(Italy) Jacopo Berrettini	4	3
WC	(Italy) Filippo Baldi	6	6
9	(Slovakia) Martin Kližan	3	1

Qualifying competition
7	(United States) Taylor Fritz	6	6
WC	(Italy) Filippo Baldi	4	3
