= 2023 Srpska Open – Singles =

Singles
- 2023 Srpska Open

Final
- Champion: (Serbia) Dušan Lajović
- Runner-up: Andrey Rublev
- Score: 6–3, 4–6, 6–4

Details
- Draw: 28 (4 Q / 3 WC )
- Seeds: 8

Events
Singles	Doubles
Srpska Open	· 2024 →

Dušan Lajović defeated Andrey Rublev in the final, 6–3, 4–6, 6–4 to win the inaugural singles tennis title at the 2023 Srpska Open.

== Seeds ==
The top four seeds received a bye into the second round.

1. (Serbia) Novak Djokovic (quarterfinals)
2. Andrey Rublev (final)
3. (Croatia) Borna Ćorić (second round)
4. (Serbia) Miomir Kecmanović (semifinals)
5. (Netherlands) Tallon Griekspoor (first round)
6. (Czech Republic) Jiří Lehečka (quarterfinals)
7. (France) Richard Gasquet (second round)
8. (France) Grégoire Barrère (second round)

== Draw ==
=== Key ===
- Q = Qualifier
- WC = Wild card
- LL = Lucky loser
- Alt = Alternate
- SE = Special exempt
- PR = Protected ranking
- ITF = ITF entry
- JE = Junior exempt
- w/o = Walkover
- r = Retired
- d = Defaulted
- SR = Special ranking

=== Finals ===
Semifinals
(Serbia) Dušan Lajović	4	7^{7}	6
4	(Serbia) Miomir Kecmanović	6	6^{5}	4
(Slovakia) Alex Molčan	2	4
2	Andrey Rublev	6	6

Final
(Serbia) Dušan Lajović	6	4	6
2	Andrey Rublev	3	6	4

=== Top half ===
First round
(France) L Van Assche	1	7^{7}	6
(Switzerland) S Wawrinka	6	6^{4}	4
(Serbia) D Lajović	6	4	6
(Serbia) F Krajinović	2	6	4
WC	(Serbia) H Međedović	6^{6}	5
8	(France) G Barrère	7^{8}	7
Q	(Sweden) E Ymer	1	5
Q	(Jordan) A Shelbayh	6	7
Q	(Moldova) R Albot	6	0
(Argentina) F Coria	4	0^{r}
WC	(France) G Monfils	4	3
6	(Czech Republic) J Lehečka	6	6

Second round
1	(Serbia) N Djokovic	6^{4}	6	6
(France) L Van Assche	7^{7}	3	2
(Serbia) D Lajović	6	6
8	(France) G Barrère	3	0
4	(Serbia) M Kecmanović	6	7^{7}
Q	(Jordan) A Shelbayh	4	6^{4}
Q	(Moldova) R Albot	0	2
6	(Czech Republic) J Lehečka	6	6

Quarterfinals
1	(Serbia) N Djokovic	4	6^{6}
(Serbia) D Lajović	6	7^{8}
4	(Serbia) M Kecmanović	7	6
6	(Czech Republic) J Lehečka	5	0

Semifinals
(Serbia) D Lajović	4	7^{7}	6
4	(Serbia) M Kecmanović	6	6^{5}	4

=== Bottom half ===
First round
5	(Netherlands) T Griekspoor	6^{4}	6^{4}
(Australia) A Popyrin	7^{7}	7^{7}
(Slovakia) A Molčan	3	7	6
(Japan) T Daniel	6	5	1
R Safiullin	4	2
(Serbia) L Đere	6	6
7	(France) R Gasquet	6	6
Q	(Croatia) D Prižmić	3	1
WC	(Bosnia and Herzegovina) D Džumhur	6	6
LL	(United Kingdom) L Broady	3	0
(Peru) JP Varillas	7	6
(France) H Gaston	5	3

Second round
(Australia) A Popyrin	6^{4}	6	5
(Slovakia) A Molčan	7^{7}	4	7
(Serbia) L Đere	6	6^{1}	6
3	(Croatia) B Ćorić	4	7^{7}	4
7	(France) R Gasquet	4	6	6^{3}
WC	(Bosnia and Herzegovina) D Džumhur	6	1	7^{7}
(Peru) JP Varillas	2	2
2	A Rublev	6	6

Quarterfinals
(Slovakia) A Molčan	6	4	7
(Serbia) L Đere	2	6	5
WC	(Bosnia and Herzegovina) D Džumhur	5	3
2	A Rublev	7	6

Semifinals
(Slovakia) A Molčan	2	4
2	A Rublev	6	6

== Qualifying ==
=== Seeds ===
1. (Moldova) Radu Albot (qualified)
2. (France) Arthur Fils (first round)
3. (United Kingdom) Liam Broady (qualifying competition, lucky loser)
4. (Hungary) Fábián Marozsán (first round)
5. (Slovakia) Lukáš Klein (qualifying competition)
6. (Sweden) Elias Ymer (qualified)
7. (Italy) Mattia Bellucci (first round)
8. (Italy) Luca Nardi (first round)

=== Qualifiers ===
1. (Moldova) Radu Albot
2. (Sweden) Elias Ymer
3. (Croatia) Dino Prižmić
4. (Jordan) Abdullah Shelbayh

=== Lucky loser ===
1. (United Kingdom) Liam Broady

=== Qualifying draw ===
==== First qualifier ====
First round
1	(Moldova) Radu Albot	6	6
WC	(Bosnia and Herzegovina) Aldin Šetkić	2	3
(Bulgaria) Dimitar Kuzmanov	6	6
8	(Italy) Luca Nardi	4	4

Qualifying competition
1	(Moldova) Radu Albot	6	6
(Bulgaria) Dimitar Kuzmanov	3	3

==== Second qualifier ====
First round
2	(France) Arthur Fils	7^{7}	3	4
(Italy) Francesco Maestrelli	6^{3}	6	6
(Bosnia and Herzegovina) Nerman Fatić	6	4	2
6	(Sweden) Elias Ymer	2	6	6

Qualifying competition
(Italy) Francesco Maestrelli	5	4
6	(Sweden) Elias Ymer	7	6

==== Third qualifier ====
First round
3	(United Kingdom) Liam Broady	6	6
(Monaco) Valentin Vacherot	3	1
WC	(Croatia) Dino Prižmić	6	6
7	(Italy) Mattia Bellucci	3	0

Qualifying competition
3	(United Kingdom) Liam Broady	5	3
WC	(Croatia) Dino Prižmić	7	6

==== Fourth qualifier ====
First round
4	(Hungary) Fábián Marozsán	5	6	3
Alt	(Jordan) Abdullah Shelbayh	7	1	6
(France) Arthur Cazaux	4	4
5	(Slovakia) Lukáš Klein	6	6

Qualifying competition
Alt	(Jordan) Abdullah Shelbayh	6	6
5	(Slovakia) Lukáš Klein	4	2
