= 2023 Srpska Open – Doubles =

Doubles
- 2023 Srpska Open

Final
- Champions: (United Kingdom) Jamie Murray (New Zealand) Michael Venus
- Runners-up: (Portugal) Francisco Cabral (Kazakhstan) Aleksandr Nedovyesov
- Score: 7–5, 6–2

Details
- Draw: 16 (2 WC )
- Seeds: 4

Events
Singles	Doubles
- Srpska Open

Jamie Murray and Michael Venus defeated Francisco Cabral and Aleksandr Nedovyesov in the final, 7–5, 6–2 to win the inaugural doubles tennis title at the 2023 Srpska Open.

This was the first edition of the tournament.

== Seeds ==
1. (United Kingdom) Jamie Murray / (New Zealand) Michael Venus (champions)
2. (Belgium) Sander Gillé / (Belgium) Joran Vliegen (semifinals)
3. (France) Sadio Doumbia / (France) Fabien Reboul (quarterfinals)
4. (Colombia) Nicolás Barrientos / (Uruguay) Ariel Behar (first round)

== Draw ==
Key

- Q = Qualifier
- WC = Wild card
- LL = Lucky loser
- Alt = Alternate
- ITF = ITF entry
- PR = Protected ranking
- SR = Special ranking
- SE = Special exempt
- JE = Junior exempt
- JR = Junior Accelerator Programme entrant
- CO = College Accelerator Programme entrant
- NG = Next Gen Accelerator Program entrant
- w/o = Walkover
- r = Retired
- d = Defaulted

=== Draw ===
First round
1	(United Kingdom) J Murray (New Zealand) M Venus	6	7
(Netherlands) T Griekspoor (Netherlands) B Stevens	3	5
(Ecuador) G Escobar (Ecuador) D Hidalgo	6	1	[10]
(France) G Barrère (France) J Eysseric	4	6	[8]
4	(Colombia) N Barrientos (Uruguay) A Behar	6^{7}	2
(Sweden) A Göransson (Japan) B McLachlan	7^{9}	6
Alt	(Kazakhstan) A Golubev (Ukraine) D Molchanov	7^{7}	4	[11]
(United States) R Galloway (Mexico) MÁ Reyes-Varela	6^{4}	6	[9]
WC	(Serbia) I Sabanov (Serbia) M Sabanov	4	4
(Portugal) F Cabral (Kazakhstan) A Nedovyesov	6	6
(Czech Republic) R Jebavý (Slovakia) A Molčan	2	1
3	(France) S Doumbia (France) F Reboul	6	6
(Serbia) N Ćaćić (Serbia) M Kecmanović	7^{7}	7
(Pakistan) A-u-H Qureshi (United States) H Reese	6^{5}	5
Alt	(Bosnia and Herzegovina) A Šetkić (Australia) J Taylor	4	2
2	(Belgium) S Gillé (Belgium) J Vliegen	6	6

Quarterfinals
1	(United Kingdom) J Murray (New Zealand) M Venus	6	4	[13]
(Ecuador) G Escobar (Ecuador) D Hidalgo	4	6	[11]
(Sweden) A Göransson (Japan) B McLachlan	3	1
Alt	(Kazakhstan) A Golubev (Ukraine) D Molchanov	6	6
(Portugal) F Cabral (Kazakhstan) A Nedovyesov	7^{7}	6
3	(France) S Doumbia (France) F Reboul	6^{5}	1
(Serbia) N Ćaćić (Serbia) M Kecmanović	6^{9}	4
2	(Belgium) S Gillé (Belgium) J Vliegen	7^{11}	6

Semifinals
1	(United Kingdom) J Murray (New Zealand) M Venus	6	7^{7}
Alt	(Kazakhstan) A Golubev (Ukraine) D Molchanov	3	6^{1}
(Portugal) F Cabral (Kazakhstan) A Nedovyesov	6^{2}	7^{7}	[10]
2	(Belgium) S Gillé (Belgium) J Vliegen	7^{7}	6^{2}	[8]

Final
1	(United Kingdom) J Murray (New Zealand) M Venus	7	6
(Portugal) F Cabral (Kazakhstan) A Nedovyesov	5	2
