= 2019 Italian Open – Men's doubles =

Men's doubles
- 2019 Italian Open

Final
- Champions: (Colombia) Juan Sebastián Cabal (Colombia) Robert Farah
- Runners-up: (South Africa) Raven Klaasen (Australia) Michael Venus
- Score: 6–1, 6–3

Events
Singles	men	women
Doubles	men	women
← 2018 ·	Italian Open	· 2020 →

Juan Sebastián Cabal and Robert Farah were the defending champions and successfully defended their title, defeating Raven Klaasen and Michael Venus in the final, 6–1, 6–3.

== Seeds ==
1. (Poland) Łukasz Kubot / (Brazil) Marcelo Melo (semifinals)
2. (United Kingdom) Jamie Murray / (Brazil) Bruno Soares (first round)
3. (Colombia) Juan Sebastián Cabal / (Colombia) Robert Farah (champions)
4. (Croatia) Nikola Mektić / (Croatia) Franko Škugor (second round)
5. (Austria) Oliver Marach / (Croatia) Mate Pavić (semifinals)
6. (South Africa) Raven Klaasen / (Australia) Michael Venus (final)
7. (United States) Bob Bryan / (United States) Mike Bryan (quarterfinals)
8. (Finland) Henri Kontinen / (Australia) John Peers (quarterfinals)

== Draw ==
=== Key ===
- Q = Qualifier
- WC = Wild card
- LL = Lucky loser
- Alt = Alternate
- SE = Special exempt
- PR = Protected ranking
- ITF = ITF entry
- JE = Junior exempt
- w/o = Walkover
- r = Retired
- d = Defaulted
- SR = Special ranking

=== Finals ===
Semifinals
1	(Poland) Łukasz Kubot (Brazil) Marcelo Melo	6	6^{4}	[8]
3	(Colombia) Juan Sebastián Cabal (Colombia) Robert Farah	2	7^{7}	[10]
5	(Austria) Oliver Marach (Croatia) Mate Pavić	6^{4}	6	[7]
6	(South Africa) Raven Klaasen (New Zealand) Michael Venus	7^{7}	4	[10]

Final
3	(Colombia) Juan Sebastián Cabal (Colombia) Robert Farah	6	6
6	(South Africa) Raven Klaasen (New Zealand) Michael Venus	1	3

=== Top half ===
First round
1	(Poland) Ł Kubot (Brazil) M Melo	6	6
WC	(Italy) S Bolelli (Italy) A Seppi	3	4
WC	(Italy) F Baldi (Italy) A Pellegrino	3	6	[7]
(Austria) J Melzer (Austria) D Thiem	6	3	[10]
(Argentina) G Pella (Argentina) D Schwartzman	1	7	[11]
(United States) R Ram (United Kingdom) J Salisbury	6	5	[9]
(Moldova) R Albot (Georgia (country)) N Basilashvili	5	3
8	(Finland) H Kontinen (Australia) J Peers	7	6
3	(Colombia) JS Cabal (Colombia) R Farah	7^{7}	6
(India) R Bopanna (United Kingdom) D Inglot	6^{5}	3
Alt	(United States) A Krajicek (New Zealand) A Sitak	7	6
(Croatia) B Ćorić (Bulgaria) G Dimitrov	5	2
(Uruguay) P Cuevas (Argentina) JM del Potro	6	6^{3}	[11]
(Russia) K Khachanov (Spain) M López	3	7^{7}	[13]
(Netherlands) J-J Rojer (Romania) H Tecău	4	6^{4}
7	(United States) B Bryan (United States) M Bryan	6	7^{7}

Second round
1	(Poland) Ł Kubot (Brazil) M Melo	7	6
(Austria) J Melzer (Austria) D Thiem	5	3
(Argentina) G Pella (Argentina) D Schwartzman
8	(Finland) H Kontinen (Australia) J Peers	w/o
3	(Colombia) JS Cabal (Colombia) R Farah	6	6
Alt	(United States) A Krajicek (New Zealand) A Sitak	3	2
(Russia) K Khachanov (Spain) M López	3	6	[3]
7	(United States) B Bryan (United States) M Bryan	6	3	[10]

Quarterfinals
1	(Poland) Ł Kubot (Brazil) M Melo	6	6^{1}	[10]
8	(Finland) H Kontinen (Australia) J Peers	2	7^{7}	[6]
3	(Colombia) JS Cabal (Colombia) R Farah	7^{7}	4	[16]
7	(United States) B Bryan (United States) M Bryan	6^{2}	6	[14]

Semifinals
1	(Poland) Ł Kubot (Brazil) M Melo	6	6^{4}	[8]
3	(Colombia) JS Cabal (Colombia) R Farah	2	7^{7}	[10]

=== Bottom half ===
First round
5	(Austria) O Marach (Croatia) M Pavić	6	6
(Japan) B McLachlan (Germany) J-L Struff	3	3
(Netherlands) W Koolhof (Greece) S Tsitsipas	3	2
(Canada) D Shapovalov (Spain) F Verdasco	6	6
(Italy) M Berrettini (Italy) F Fognini
(United Kingdom) K Edmund (United Kingdom) N Skupski	w/o
(Croatia) I Dodig (France) É Roger-Vasselin	4	6	[3]
4	(Croatia) N Mektić (Croatia) F Škugor	6	3	[10]
6	(South Africa) R Klaasen (New Zealand) M Venus	7^{7}	6
(Germany) A Zverev (Germany) M Zverev	6^{2}	4
(Netherlands) M Middelkoop (France) G Simon	7^{7}	5	[10]
(Spain) P Carreño Busta (Portugal) J Sousa	6^{5}	7	[5]
(Argentina) M González (Argentina) H Zeballos	6	6
WC	(Italy) M Cecchinato (Italy) L Sonego	2	4
(France) J Chardy (Belgium) D Goffin	6	6
2	(United Kingdom) J Murray (Brazil) B Soares	4	4

Second round
5	(Austria) O Marach (Croatia) M Pavić	6	7^{7}
(Canada) D Shapovalov (Spain) F Verdasco	3	6^{4}
(United Kingdom) K Edmund (United Kingdom) N Skupski	7^{7}	1	[10]
4	(Croatia) N Mektić (Croatia) F Škugor	6^{3}	6	[7]
6	(South Africa) R Klaasen (New Zealand) M Venus	6	6
(Netherlands) M Middelkoop (France) G Simon	4	2
(Argentina) M González (Argentina) H Zeballos	6	6
(France) J Chardy (Belgium) D Goffin	3	3

Quarterfinals
5	(Austria) O Marach (Croatia) M Pavić	7^{7}	6
(United Kingdom) K Edmund (United Kingdom) N Skupski	6^{4}	0
6	(South Africa) R Klaasen (New Zealand) M Venus	7^{7}	5	[10]
(Argentina) M González (Argentina) H Zeballos	6^{4}	7	[7]

Semifinals
5	(Austria) O Marach (Croatia) M Pavić	6^{4}	6	[7]
6	(South Africa) R Klaasen (New Zealand) M Venus	7^{7}	4	[10]
