= 2016 Davis Cup Asia/Oceania Zone Group I =

International tennis competition

The Asia/Oceania Zone was one of the three zones of the regional Davis Cup men's tennis competition in 2016.

In the Asia/Oceania Zone there were four different tiers, called groups, in which teams competed against each other to advance to the upper tier. Winners in Group I advanced to the World Group play-offs, along with losing teams from the World Group first round. Teams who lost their respective ties competed in the relegation play-offs, with winning teams remaining in Group I, whereas teams who lost their play-offs were relegated to the Asia/Oceania Zone Group II in 2017.

== Participating nations ==
Seeds: All seeds received a bye into the second round.

1. India
2. Uzbekistan

Remaining nations:

- China
- New Zealand
- Pakistan
- South Korea

=== Draw ===
Second-round play-offs
Christchurch, New Zealand (indoor hard)
New Zealand	5
Pakistan	0

First-round play-offs
bye
New Zealand
Pakistan
bye

First Round
1	India
bye
Seoul, South Korea (hard)
New Zealand	1
South Korea	3
Colombo, Sri Lanka (clay)
Pakistan	0
China	5
bye
2	Uzbekistan

Second Round
Chandigarh, India (grass)
1	India	4
South Korea	1
Tashkent, Uzbekistan (clay)
China	2
2	Uzbekistan	3

- Pakistan relegated to Group II in 2017.
- India and Uzbekistan advance to World Group play-off.

== First round ==
=== South Korea vs. New Zealand ===
South Korea
3
Seoul Olympic Park Tennis Center, Seoul, South Korea
4–6 March 2016
Hard

New Zealand
1

			1	2	3	4	5
1	(South Korea) (New Zealand)	Hong Seong-chan; Jose Rubin Statham	6; 4	6; 3	4; 6	7^{8} 6^{6}
2	(South Korea) (New Zealand)	Chung Hyeon; Michael Venus	6; 4	7; 5	6; 1
3	(South Korea) (New Zealand)	Lim Yong-Kyu / Lee Duckhee; Artem Sitak / Michael Venus	6^{3} 7^{7}	4; 6	6; 4	4; 6
4	(South Korea) (New Zealand)	Chung Hyeon; Jose Rubin Statham	6; 2	6; 4	6; 2
5	(South Korea) (New Zealand)	Hong Seong-chan; Michael Venus						not played

=== Pakistan vs. China ===
Pakistan
0
Sri Lanka Tennis Association, Colombo, Sri Lanka
4–6 March 2016
Clay

China
5

			1	2	3	4	5
1	(Pakistan) (China)	Aqeel Khan; Zhang Ze	4; 6	2; 6	2; 6
2	(Pakistan) (China)	Yasir Khan; Wu Di	6; 3	1; 6	4; 6	2; 6
3	(Pakistan) (China)	Aqeel Khan / Aisam-ul-Haq Qureshi; Bai Yan / Gong Maoxin	4; 6	6; 3	3; 6	6^{4} 7^{7}
4	(Pakistan) (China)	Muhammad Abid; Wu Di	1; 6	0; 6
5	(Pakistan) (China)	Yasir Khan; Zhang Ze	3; 6	0; 6

== Second round ==
=== India vs. South Korea ===
India
4
Chandigarh Club Limited, Chandigarh, India
15–17 July 2016
Grass

South Korea
1

			1	2	3	4	5
1	(India) (South Korea)	Ramkumar Ramanathan; Hong Seong-chan	6; 3	2; 6	6; 3	6; 5		retired
2	(India) (South Korea)	Saketh Myneni; Lim Yong-kyu	6; 1	3; 6	6; 4	3; 6	5; 2	retired
3	(India) (South Korea)	Rohan Bopanna / Leander Paes; Chung Hong / Chung Yun-seong	6; 3	6; 4	6; 4
4	(India) (South Korea)	Rohan Bopanna; Chung Hong	3; 6	6; 4	6; 4
5	(India) (South Korea)	Ramkumar Ramanathan; Lim Yong-kyu	3; 6	7; 5	6^{2} 7^{7}

=== Uzbekistan vs. China ===
Uzbekistan
3
Olympic Tennis School, Tashkent, Uzbekistan
15–17 July 2016
Clay

China
2

			1	2	3	4	5
1	(Uzbekistan) (China)	Farrukh Dustov; Zhang Ze	6; 1	4; 6	4; 6	2; 6
2	(Uzbekistan) (China)	Denis Istomin; Wu Di	6; 4	6; 4	6; 2
3	(Uzbekistan) (China)	Farrukh Dustov / Denis Istomin; Gong Maoxin / Li Zhe	6; 4	3; 6	6; 3	6; 4
4	(Uzbekistan) (China)	Denis Istomin; Zhang Ze	6; 3	5; 7	6; 2	1; 6	4; 6
5	(Uzbekistan) (China)	Farrukh Dustov; Wu Di	7^{7} 6^{1}	6; 3	7^{7} 6^{5}

== 2nd Round relegation play-off ==
=== New Zealand vs. Pakistan ===
New Zealand
5
Wilding Park, Christchurch, New Zealand
16–18 September
Hard (i)

Pakistan
0

			1	2	3	4	5
1	(New Zealand) (Pakistan)	Jose Statham; Mohammad Abid	6; 0	6; 1	6; 4
2	(New Zealand) (Pakistan)	Finn Tearney; Samir Iftikhar	6; 2	6; 0	6; 0
3	(New Zealand) (Pakistan)	Marcus Daniell / Michael Venus; Mohammad Abid / Aqeel Khan	6; 0	6; 1	6; 2
4	(New Zealand) (Pakistan)	Finn Tearney; Mohammad Abid	6; 1	6; 3
5	(New Zealand) (Pakistan)	Jose Statham; Samir Iftikhar	6; 4	6; 1
