= 2019 Italian Open – Women's singles =

Women's singles
- 2019 Italian Open

Final
- Champion: (Czech Republic) Karolína Plíšková
- Runner-up: (United Kingdom) Johanna Konta
- Score: 6–3, 6–4

Details
- Draw: 56 (8 Q / 5 WC )
- Seeds: 16

Events
Singles	men	women
Doubles	men	women
- Italian Open

Karolína Plíšková defeated Johanna Konta in the final, 6–3, 6–4 to win the women's singles tennis title at the 2019 Italian Open.

Elina Svitolina was the two-time defending champion, but lost in the second round to Victoria Azarenka.

Naomi Osaka and Simona Halep were in contention for the WTA no. 1 singles ranking at the beginning of the tournament. Osaka retained the top ranking following Halep's loss in the second round.

This was the first Italian Open in eight years which was not won by either of Maria Sharapova, Serena Williams or Svitolina.

== Seeds ==
The top eight seeds received a bye into the second round.

1. (Japan) Naomi Osaka (quarterfinals, withdrew)
2. (Czech Republic) Petra Kvitová (third round, retired)
3. (Romania) Simona Halep (second round)
4. (Czech Republic) Karolína Plíšková (champion)
5. (Ukraine) Elina Svitolina (second round)
6. (Netherlands) Kiki Bertens (semifinals)
7. (United States) Sloane Stephens (second round)
8. (Australia) Ashleigh Barty (third round)

9. (Belarus) Aryna Sabalenka (first round)
10. (United States) Serena Williams (second round, withdrew)
11. (Denmark) Caroline Wozniacki (first round, retired)
12. (Latvia) Anastasija Sevastova (first round)
13. (United States) Madison Keys (second round)
14. (Estonia) Anett Kontaveit (second round)
15. (China) Wang Qiang (first round)
16. (Germany) Julia Görges (second round, retired)

Click on the seed number of a player to go to their draw section.

== Draw ==
Key

- Q = Qualifier
- WC = Wild card
- LL = Lucky loser
- Alt = Alternate
- ITF = ITF entry
- PR = Protected ranking
- SR = Special ranking
- SE = Special exempt
- JE = Junior exempt
- JR = Junior Accelerator Programme entrant
- CO = College Accelerator Programme entrant
- NG = Next Gen Accelerator Program entrant
- w/o = Walkover
- r = Retired
- d = Defaulted

=== Finals ===
Quarterfinals
1	(Japan) Naomi Osaka
6	(Netherlands) Kiki Bertens	w/o
(Czech Republic) Markéta Vondroušová	3	6	1
(United Kingdom) Johanna Konta	6	3	6
WC	(Belarus) Victoria Azarenka	7^{7}	2	2
4	(Czech Republic) Karolína Plíšková	6^{5}	6	6
Q	(France) Kristina Mladenovic	7	3	0
Q	(Greece) Maria Sakkari	5	6	6

Semifinals
6	(Netherlands) Kiki Bertens	7	5	2
(United Kingdom) Johanna Konta	5	7	6
4	(Czech Republic) Karolína Plíšková	6	6
Q	(Greece) Maria Sakkari	4	4

Final
(United Kingdom) Johanna Konta	3	4
4	(Czech Republic) Karolína Plíšková	6	6

=== Top half ===
==== Section 1 ====
First round
(Belarus) A Sasnovich	2	3
(Slovakia) D Cibulková	6	6
(Romania) M Buzărnescu	6	5
(Latvia) J Ostapenko	2	4^{r}
(Chinese Taipei) S-w Hsieh	3	4
16	(Germany) J Görges	6	6
9	(Belarus) A Sabalenka	1	4
Q	(France) A Cornet	6	6
(Ukraine) D Yastremska	4	6	3
(Spain) C Suárez Navarro	6	1	6
LL	(United States) A Anisimova	6	6
WC	(Italy) E Cocciaretto	3	3

Second round
1	(Japan) N Osaka	6	6
(Slovakia) D Cibulková	3	3
(Romania) M Buzărnescu	6	3	4
16	(Germany) J Görges	4	6	4^{r}
Q	(France) A Cornet	3	0^{r}
(Spain) C Suárez Navarro	6	3
LL	(United States) A Anisimova	2	6	5
6	(Netherlands) K Bertens	6	4	7

Third round
1	(Japan) N Osaka	6	6
(Romania) M Buzărnescu	3	3
(Spain) C Suárez Navarro	4	6	3
6	(Netherlands) K Bertens	6	1	6

Quarterfinals
1	(Japan) N Osaka
6	(Netherlands) K Bertens	w/o

==== Section 2 ====
First round
(Czech Republic) M Vondroušová	1	6	7^{7}
(Czech Republic) B Strýcová	6	4	6^{4}
Q	(Romania) I-C Begu	2	6^{5}
(Russia) D Kasatkina	6	7^{7}
(Czech Republic) K Siniaková	1	7	6
15	(China) Q Wang	6	5	4
10	(United States) S Williams	6	6
Q	(Sweden) R Peterson	4	2
WC	(United States) V Williams	7	3	7^{7}
(Belgium) E Mertens	5	6	6^{4}
(United Kingdom) J Konta	6	6
(United States) A Riske	4	1

Second round
3	(Romania) S Halep	6	5	3
(Czech Republic) M Vondroušová	2	7	6
(Russia) D Kasatkina	2	6	6
(Czech Republic) K Siniaková	6	4	1
10	(United States) S Williams
WC	(United States) V Williams	w/o
(United Kingdom) J Konta	6^{3}	6	6
7	(United States) S Stephens	7^{7}	4	1

Third round
(Czech Republic) M Vondroušová	7	2	6
(Russia) D Kasatkina	5	6	2
WC	(United States) V Williams	2	4
(United Kingdom) J Konta	6	6

Quarterfinals
(Czech Republic) M Vondroušová	3	6	1
(United Kingdom) J Konta	6	3	6

=== Bottom half ===
==== Section 3 ====
First round
WC	(Belarus) V Azarenka	6	6
(China) S Zhang	2	1
(China) S Zheng	3	4
(Spain) G Muguruza	6	6
(United States) D Collins	7^{7}	0
11	(Denmark) C Wozniacki	6^{5}	0^{r}
13	(United States) M Keys	6	7^{7}
Q	(Slovenia) P Hercog	4	6^{3}
(United States) S Kenin	6	6
WC	(Italy) J Paolini	1	2
Q	(Slovenia) T Zidanšek	6^{1}	4
(Australia) A Tomljanović	7^{7}	6

Second round
5	(Ukraine) E Svitolina	6	1	5
WC	(Belarus) V Azarenka	4	6	7
(Spain) G Muguruza	6	4	6
(United States) D Collins	4	6	2
13	(United States) M Keys	7^{7}	3	4
(United States) S Kenin	6^{2}	6	6
(Australia) A Tomljanović	3	3
4	(Czech Republic) Ka Plíšková	6	6

Third round
WC	(Belarus) V Azarenka	6	3
(Spain) G Muguruza	4	1^{r}
(United States) S Kenin	6	4	3
4	(Czech Republic) Ka Plíšková	4	6	6

Quarterfinals
WC	(Belarus) V Azarenka	7^{7}	2	2
4	(Czech Republic) Ka Plíšková	6^{5}	6	6

==== Section 4 ====
First round
(Slovakia) V Kužmová	6	6
WC	(Italy) S Errani	1	0
(France) C Garcia	1	2
Q	(France) K Mladenovic	6	6
(Switzerland) B Bencic	2	6	6
12	(Latvia) A Sevastova	6	3	2
14	(Estonia) A Kontaveit	4	6	6
Q	(Germany) M Barthel	6	4	4
Q	(Greece) M Sakkari	6	7
(Russia) A Pavlyuchenkova	1	5
(Ukraine) L Tsurenko	4	2
(Kazakhstan) Y Putintseva	6	6

Second round
8	(Australia) A Barty	4	6	6
(Slovakia) V Kužmová	6	3	4
Q	(France) K Mladenovic	6	2	6
(Switzerland) B Bencic	2	6	1
14	(Estonia) A Kontaveit	3	2
Q	(Greece) M Sakkari	6	6
(Kazakhstan) Y Putintseva	0	1
2	(Czech Republic) P Kvitová	6	6

Third round
8	(Australia) A Barty	2	3
Q	(France) K Mladenovic	6	6
Q	(Greece) M Sakkari	7	5	4
2	(Czech Republic) P Kvitová	5	7	0^{r}

Quarterfinals
Q	(France) K Mladenovic	7	3	0
Q	(Greece) M Sakkari	5	6	6

== Qualifying ==
=== Seeds ===
1. (Greece) Maria Sakkari (qualified)
2. (United States) Amanda Anisimova (qualifying competition, lucky loser)
3. (France) Alizé Cornet (qualified)
4. (Tunisia) Ons Jabeur (qualifying competition)
5. (China) Wang Yafan (first round)
6. (Australia) Daria Gavrilova (first round)
7. (Sweden) Rebecca Peterson (qualified)
8. (Russia) Ekaterina Alexandrova (first round)
9. (Germany) Tatjana Maria (first round)
10. (Puerto Rico) Monica Puig (qualifying competition)
11. (France) Kristina Mladenovic (qualified)
12. (Russia) Margarita Gasparyan (first round, retired)
13. (Germany) Andrea Petkovic (qualifying competition)
14. (Serbia) Aleksandra Krunić (first round)
15. (Slovenia) Tamara Zidanšek (qualified)
16. (France) Pauline Parmentier (first round)

=== Qualifiers ===
1. (Greece) Maria Sakkari
2. (France) Kristina Mladenovic
3. (France) Alizé Cornet
4. (Slovenia) Tamara Zidanšek
5. (Slovenia) Polona Hercog
6. (Romania) Irina-Camelia Begu
7. (Sweden) Rebecca Peterson
8. (Germany) Mona Barthel

=== Lucky loser ===
1. (United States) Amanda Anisimova

=== Qualifying draw ===
==== First qualifier ====
First round
1	(Greece) Maria Sakkari	6	6
(Russia) Vera Zvonareva	4	2
WC	(Italy) Georgia Brescia	4	3
13	(Germany) Andrea Petkovic	6	6

Qualifying competition
1	(Greece) Maria Sakkari	6	7
13	(Germany) Andrea Petkovic	2	5

==== Second qualifier ====
First round
2	(United States) Amanda Anisimova	6	7
(Russia) Anastasia Potapova	2	5
Alt	(France) Fiona Ferro	6^{4}	2
11	(France) Kristina Mladenovic	7^{7}	6

Qualifying competition
2	(United States) Amanda Anisimova	1	4
11	(France) Kristina Mladenovic	6	6

==== Third qualifier ====
First round
3	(France) Alizé Cornet	6	2	6
(Poland) Magda Linette	4	6	3
(Czech Republic) Kristýna Plíšková	6	6
14	(Serbia) Aleksandra Krunić	3	2

Qualifying competition
3	(France) Alizé Cornet	6	7^{7}
(Czech Republic) Kristýna Plíšková	4	6^{4}

==== Fourth qualifier ====
First round
4	(Tunisia) Ons Jabeur	6	6
(Spain) Sara Sorribes Tormo	0	2
WC	(Italy) Lucrezia Stefanini	5	3
15	(Slovenia) Tamara Zidanšek	7	6

Qualifying competition
4	(Tunisia) Ons Jabeur	3	6^{4}
15	(Slovenia) Tamara Zidanšek	6	7^{7}

==== Fifth qualifier ====
First round
5	(China) Wang Yafan	2	4
(Slovenia) Polona Hercog	6	6
(Switzerland) Viktorija Golubic	4	6	6
9	(Germany) Tatjana Maria	6	3	0

Qualifying competition
(Slovenia) Polona Hercog	7	4	6
(Switzerland) Viktorija Golubic	5	6	4

==== Sixth qualifier ====
First round
6	(Australia) Daria Gavrilova	6^{1}	6	2
(Romania) Irina-Camelia Begu	7^{7}	2	6
WC	(Italy) Anastasia Grymalska	4	2
10	(Puerto Rico) Monica Puig	6	6

Qualifying competition
(Romania) Irina-Camelia Begu	6	6
10	(Puerto Rico) Monica Puig	2	4

==== Seventh qualifier ====
First round
7	(Sweden) Rebecca Peterson	6	6
(Russia) Veronika Kudermetova	4	2
(Australia) Samantha Stosur	3
12	(Russia) Margarita Gasparyan	1^{r}

Qualifying competition
7	(Sweden) Rebecca Peterson	7	7
(Australia) Samantha Stosur	5	5

==== Eighth qualifier ====
First round
8	(Russia) Ekaterina Alexandrova	3	6	4
Alt	(Germany) Mona Barthel	6	3	6
WC	(Italy) Cristiana Ferrando	6	0	6
16	(France) Pauline Parmentier	4	6	3

Qualifying competition
Alt	(Germany) Mona Barthel	6	6
WC	(Italy) Cristiana Ferrando	3	4
