= Michael Venus =

New Zealand tennis player (born 1987)

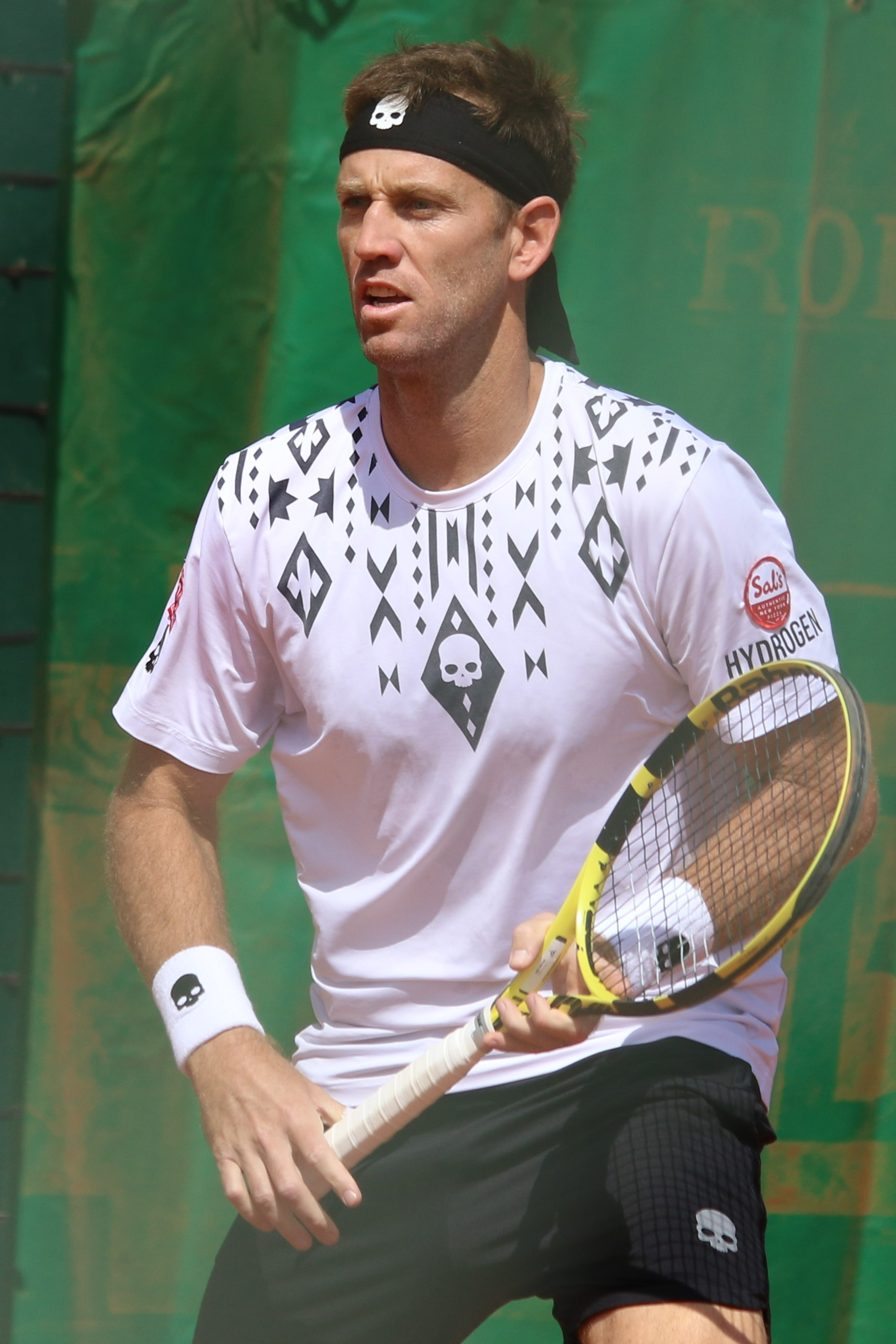
- Venus at the 2022 Monte-Carlo Masters
- Country (sports): United States (2002–2010); New Zealand (since 2010)
- Residence: London, England
- Born: 16 October 1987 (age 39) Auckland, New Zealand
- Height: 6 ft 3 in (1.91 m)
- Turned pro: 2009
- Plays: Right-handed (two-handed backhand)
- College: Louisiana State University
- Coach: Pat Harrison, Davide Sanguinetti, William Ward
- Prize money: $ 4,961,350

Singles
- Career record: 11–20
- Career titles: 0
- Highest ranking: No. 274 (25 July 2011)

Grand Slam singles results
- US Open: Q2 (2009)

Doubles
- Career record: 366–250
- Career titles: 25
- Highest ranking: No. 6 (29 August 2022)
- Current ranking: No. 18 (9 June 2025)

Grand Slam doubles results
- Australian Open: QF (2019, 2022)
- French Open: W (2017)
- Wimbledon: F (2018)
- US Open: SF (2025)

Other doubles tournaments
- Tour Finals: F (2019)
- Olympic Games: Bronze (2021)

Mixed doubles
- Career titles: 0

Grand Slam mixed doubles results
- Australian Open: SF (2025)
- French Open: F (2023)
- Wimbledon: SF (2018, 2024)
- US Open: F (2017, 2019)
Medal record
Olympic Games
Bronze medal – third place	2020 Tokyo	Men's doubles
- Last updated on: 16 June 2025.

Michael Venus (born 16 October 1987) is a New Zealand professional tennis player. He has a career-high doubles ranking of world No. 6, achieved on 29 August 2022. Venus won the 2017 French Open men's doubles partnering Ryan Harrison, and followed with a runner-up finish in the 2017 US Open mixed doubles partnering Chan Hao-ching. Venus and Harrison qualified for the year-end championships ATP Finals, where they reached the semifinals.

In 2018, Venus made the men's doubles final at Wimbledon with Raven Klaasen, losing to Mike Bryan and Jack Sock, and was a semifinalist in the mixed doubles there as well with Katarina Srebotnik. He and Klaasen qualified for the ATP Finals, but won only one round-robin match. They also qualified in 2019, finishing runners-up. In the meantime, Venus and Chan Hao-ching again finished runners-up in the US Open mixed doubles. Venus and John Peers qualified for the 2020 ATP Finals, but lost close contests in all three of their round-robin matches.

Venus won a bronze medal in the men's doubles at the 2020 Tokyo Olympics alongside Marcus Daniell.

== Early years ==
Venus's family moved to the United States, where he won the Boys' 18 National Clay Courts in 2006. His idols were Andre Agassi and Pete Sampras. He vacillated between attending college and turning professional, and considering the senior tour, but ultimately decided to pursue the College Conference. Having represented the U.S. through college, he switched nationalities in June 2010 to the country of his birth, and began playing for the New Zealand Davis Cup team.

== Career ==
=== 2006–2009: College years and first ITF tournaments ===
Venus transferred to Louisiana State University from the University of Texas after his freshman year and sat out the 2006–2007 season, following NCAA guidelines. In his first year at LSU, Venus became the first LSU player to win the ITA Men's All-American Championship at the national tournament in Tulsa, Oklahoma in January 2008. He is one of only two Louisianan college players to finish in the top ten of the Campbell's ITA College Tennis Rankings in both singles and doubles in the same year (No. 7 in singles and No. 4 in doubles, respectively), which he accomplished in his final season in 2008–2009. He was a representative of the United States team in the BNP Paribas International University Challenge of Tennis in Poitiers, France in December 2009.

College Accolades
Year	Title
2009	ITA Singles All-American
2009	ITA Doubles All-American
2009	SEC Player of the Year
2009	First-Team All-SEC
2009	SEC Honor Roll
2009	Louisiana Player of the Year
2009	First-Team All-Louisiana
2008	D'Novo All-American Champion
2008	First-Team All-SEC
2008	Louisiana Player of the Year
2008	D'Novo All-American Champion
2008	First-Team All-Louisiana
2008	Louisiana Newcomer of the Year

Venus finished the 2007 season winning the USA F26 Futures in doubles, partnering with Danny Bryan, losing only in the final of Thailand F3 Futures thus peaking at 866 in singles on the ATP world tour.

In 2008, despite playing the final of Baton Rouge Challenger with partner Ryan Harrison, due to his singles performance Venus closed the year at the 1752nd position on the South African Airways ATP rankings.

In July 2009, Venus clinched the title of USA F17 Futures beating Vasek Pospisil in the final. He reached the doubles final of the USA F19 Futures in August teaming with Colt Gaston losing in two straight sets. At the end of the month, Venus earned a wildcard to the qualifying draw of the 2009 US Open in which he advanced to the second round overcoming Uruguay's Marcel Felder in two sets but failing to qualify by losing to Giovanni Lapentti of Ecuador. In October, the Venus-Harrison pair won the USA F24 Futures against fellow Kudla-Sarmiento and in November playing with Gaston they lost in the championship match in the USA F27 Futures against the Armenian-Russian duo Martirosyan-Sitak. He reached his career year-end high of 587.

=== 2010: Top 350 in singles ===
Venus won another futures the USA F13 Futures tournament but lost in his first ever challenger series final in Qarshi against Blaž Kavčič in two tie-breaker sets. In the same year he won his first Davis Cup match representing New Zealand. He advanced to 328 at year-end.

=== 2017: French Open champion, US Open mixed-doubles finalist, ATP Finals semifinalist ===
The standout year in Venus's career began when he teamed up with Ryan Harrison to play doubles together for the first time in several years. Not only did they win titles at the French Open and in Estoril but they also qualified for the end of season 2017 ATP Finals, where they lost in the semifinals. At the end of the year Venus was ranked number 15 in the world, with Harrison one place below.

Venus's mixed doubles campaigns at Grand Slam events also improved through the year, losing in the first round in Melbourne, in the second in Paris, and in the third at Wimbledon, before going all the way to the final in New York.

=== 2018: Wimbledon doubles finalist and mixed-doubles semifinalist ===
Venus began the new year in Brisbane, where he teamed up with Marcelo Demoliner to win the first round but lose the second. Back to his home event in Auckland, Venus was given a wildcard into the singles, but was unfortunate enough to draw world No. 20 (and eventual winner) Roberto Bautista Agut in the first round, being beaten 6–2, 6–1. In the doubles, he and new partner Raven Klaasen won their first two matches before being beaten 7–6^{(7)}, 7–6^{(6)} in their semi-final by Max Mirnyi and Philipp Oswald.

Seeded 8th in the Australian Open, Venus and Klaasen lost in the first round a titanic first set tie-break 14–16, and a more straightforward one in the second set, to go down 7–6^{(14)}, 7–6^{(4)} to Scott Lipsky and David Marrero. Venus and Chan won their first mixed doubles match comfortably, but were well-beaten in the second round by eventual semifinalists, Marcelo Demoliner and María José Martínez Sánchez.

The first round of the Asia/Pacific Group I Davis Cup took place in Tianjin, China, at the start of February. Venus played the second singles rubber for New Zealand after Rubin Statham had won the first, but he lost to Zhang Ze after winning the first set. New Zealand lost the doubles, and then the first reverse singles, so the dead fifth rubber was not played. His next ATP tournament was in Rotterdam, where he and Klaasen lost in the first round.

They then went to Marseille, where they won the Open 13 Provence. It was special for Venus on two counts – he was winning the tournament for the second time, having been successful with Mate Pavić in 2016, and it was also the first time that two New Zealanders had contested an ATP World Tour doubles final on opposite sides of the net, the runners-up being Marcus Daniell (New Zealand) and Dominic Inglot. This had previously happened only in one Challenger (Daniell and Rubin Statham in Adelaide in 2014) and several ITF Futures events. A week later they were in Dubai, where they lost in the second round.

Next stop on tour was the first Masters 1000 tournament for the year, in Indian Wells. Venus and Klaasen beat Colombians Juan Sebastián Cabal and Robert Farah in the first round, but were then well-beaten by eighth seeds Ivan Dodig and Rajeev Ram. Ram and Klaasen had combined to win the tournament the previous year, but Dodig and Ram went out in the next round to the eventual champions, John Isner and Jack Sock. Venus and Klaasen had immediate revenge over Dodig and Ram, beating them in the first round at Miami, before beating Isner and Donald Young in the second round. They lost a titanic quarter-final battle to the Bryan brothers, going down 8–10 in the match tie-break.

Venus and Klaasen started the European clay-court season at the Monte-Carlo Masters. After an easy win in the first round, and a walkover in the second, they lost 7–6^{(8)}, 6–3 to Simone Bolelli and Fabio Fognini in the quarterfinals. Looking to defend the title he had won at Estoril the previous year, Venus and Klaasen were beaten in the first round. In Madrid they made it through to the quarterfinals, losing to Nikola Mektić and Alexander Peya, while in Rome they lost in the second round to Jamie Murray and Bruno Soares.

Moving on to Roland-Garros to defend his title in the French Open, Venus and Klaasen were seeded tenth, and disposed of French teams in the first two rounds, before meeting eighth seeds Mektic and Peya in the third round. The higher-ranked pair were again their nemesis, but the win was not without a struggle, as the final score of 7–6^{(2)}, 7–6^{(4)} would indicate. Venus and Chan Hao-ching teamed up again for the mixed doubles, but were well-beaten in the first round by Matwé Middelkoop and Demi Schuurs.

Venus and Klaasen started their grass-court season at 's-Hertogenbosch, where Venus had won the title two years earlier with Mate Pavić. Ironically, it had been Klaasen who was on the losing end that day, and his then partner, Dominic Inglot, faced the pair in the final, this time alongside Croatian Franko Škugor. In a tight match, it was the European pair who prevailed 7–6^{(3)}, 7–5. They then moved on to Halle where, as seeds, it was a surprise that they were beaten in the first round by Tim Pütz and Jan-Lennard Struff. Their last tournament before Wimbledon was at Eastbourne where, again slightly surprisingly, they lost in the second round to Ken and Neal Skupski.

Wimbledon would be another milestone in Venus's career, as he came so close to winning his second major title, and was only one step further back in pursuit of a mixed doubles crown as well. In the men's doubles, Venus and Klaasen had straightforward wins in the first two rounds, followed by marathon five set encounters in the next two over Leonardo Mayer and João Sousa and then Jamie Murray and Bruno Soares, the latter a nice revenge for the loss in Rome. The semifinal win over Frederik Nielsen and Joe Salisbury took four sets, but the final against Mike Bryan and Jack Sock was a classic encounter: another five-set match in which all four players demonstrated moments of absolute magic, but it was the American pair who eventually prevailed, the final score being 6–3, 6–7^{(7)}, 6–3, 5–7, 7–5.

Venus had a new partner in Katarina Srebotnik for the mixed doubles. Seeded ninth, they had a bye in the first round, then took three sets to beat Andrei Vasilevski and Anastasia Rodionova, and three more to beat the fifth seeds Nikola Mektić and Venus's former doubles partner Chan Hao-ching in a gripping encounter. In the quarterfinals they had an easy finish over Ivan Dodig and Chan's sister Latisha after splitting the first two sets, but Srebotnik losing her serve in both sets spelt the end of their run when they reached the semifinal, going down 6–4, 6–4, to Nicole Melichar and Alexander Peya.

After a short break, Venus and Klaasen headed to Washington, D.C., where they went down in the semifinals of the Washington Open to Murray and Soares in straight sets, 7–5, 7–6^{(2)}. From there they went to the Rogers Cup in Toronto, where they beat Artem Sitak and Stefanos Tsitsipas in the first round, before defeating the seeded pairs of Łukasz Kubot and Marcelo Melo, their Wimbledon conquerors Mike Bryan and Jack Sock, and finally the top seeds Oliver Marach and Mate Pavić to reach the final against second seeds Henri Kontinen and John Peers. They lost the first set when Klaasen lost both his service games, but saved three match points in the second set tie-break before eventually succumbing 10–6 in the match tie-break. They followed that up with the next Masters 1000 event, in Cincinnati, where they lost in the second round to Kubot and Melo.

In the US Open, Venus played both men's and mixed doubles, losing in the second round in both. In the men's event he and Klaasen were seeded eighth, but lost to Máximo González and Nicolás Jarry in straight sets after beating singles specialists Lukáš Lacko and John Millman. In the mixed doubles, he again played with Srebotnik, and they were the seventh seeds. They defeated former Grand Slam champions Laura Siegemund and Rohan Bopanna in the first round, before falling to Raluca Olaru and Franko Škugor in the second, beaten 16–14 in a monumental match tie-break which lasted 22 minutes.

From there Venus travelled to Korea, where he joined the New Zealand team in their Davis Cup Asia/Oceania Group I relegation playoff tie against the hosts. Playing only singles, Venus lost to Lee Duck-hee and Hong Seong-chan. Losing the tie 2–3, New Zealand returned to the Asia/Oceania Group II for the first time in five years.

Next stop on the tournament circuit was the Japan Open in Tokyo, where Venus and Klaasen went all the way to the final, where they were beaten by Ben McLachlan and Jan-Lennard Struff. They got their revenge on that pair just days later, when beating them in the second round of the Shanghai Masters, before losing yet another close match with Łukasz Kubot and Marcelo Melo. Venus then raced back to London to be with his fiancée, Sally Trafford, for the birth of their first child on October 14.

A couple of weeks later it was time for the Paris Masters, where they lost in the quarterfinals to Jean-Julien Rojer and Horia Tecău. Having qualified for the Nitto ATP Finals, they disappointingly opened their round-robin with a loss in a match tie-break against Murray and Soares, before beating Mektic and a still-recovering Peya in two tie-break sets, but lost the final round-robin match to Cabal and Farah in straight sets.

=== 2019: Australian Open quarterfinal, top 10, Wimbledon semifinal, ATP Finals runner-up ===
Venus and Klaasen started the year in Auckland at the ASB Classic, where they had revenge for their loss in Miami to the Bryan brothers by beating them comfortably in the semifinal, before once again finding Ben McLachlan and Jan-Lennard Struff too strong in a final, being beaten 6–3, 6–4.

Seeded sixth, Venus and Klaasen lost the first set in their first round match at the Australian Open, but took the next two to beat Bradley Klahn and Mikhail Kukushkin. They then had straight sets wins over Marcus Daniell and Wesley Koolhof in the second round, and Marcelo Demoliner and Frederik Nielsen in the third, before surprisingly being beaten in the quarterfinals by Leonardo Mayer and João Sousa, 6–4, 7–6^{(6)}. Venus had another new partner in the mixed doubles, rising American star Danielle Collins, but they were beaten in the first round by Chan Hao-ching and Jean-Julien Rojer.

After consecutive first-round losses in Rotterdam, Marseille and Dubai, Venus and Klaasen turned the corner at the first ATP Masters 1000 event of the year, in Indian Wells. Seeded seventh, they gained revenge over McLachlan and Struff when beating them in the second round, before losing in a match tie-break in the quarter-finals to third seeds Oliver Marach and Mate Pavić. They had saved two match points in the second set at 4–5, 30–40, but were eventually beaten 6–4, 6–7^{(5)}, 10–5.

Another first round loss followed when they went to Miami, this time to Matwé Middelkoop and Diego Schwartzman, before disaster struck when Venus took in an extra tournament for clay court practice before the next Masters 1000 tournament in Monte Carlo. He teamed up with Tim Pütz in Marrakech, but they had to retire from their first round match when Venus rolled his left ankle. What was initially thought to be a sprain at worst turned out to involve enough damage to the ankle ligaments to put his whole European clay court campaign in jeopardy, but he recovered so well that he was fit enough to return for the Italian Open a month later. He and Klaasen went all the way to the final, where they were beaten by Juan Sebastián Cabal and Robert Farah.

The French Open was a disappointing tournament for Venus, beaten in the first round of both the men's doubles and mixed doubles, the latter with a new partner in Galina Voskoboeva. From there it was on to grass for the first time this year, in 's-Hertogenbosch, where Venus and Klaasen lost to Marcus Daniell and Wesley Koolhof in the second round. They followed that up with their first title of the year, in Halle, beating Łukasz Kubot and Marcelo Melo in the final for a perfect lead-up to Wimbledon. As a result, he reached the top 10 on 24 June 2019. The home of grass court tennis proved almost as good to them as it had a year earlier, this time getting as far as the semifinals. Seeded third, they had three straight sets victories to start, before a marathon five set win over Henri Kontinen and John Peers in their quarterfinal. The semifinal saw them come up against Cabal and Farah yet again, the Colombians prevailing in four sets. They would go on to win the title and become joint world number one in the doubles rankings. Venus teamed up again with Katarina Srebotnik for the mixed doubles, where they were seeded 10th and received a bye to the second round, where they lost a really tight match to the French Open semi-finalists Nadiia Kichenok and Aisam-ul-Haq Qureshi.

The first stop in preparing for the US Open was in Washington, where Venus and Klaasen took out their second ATP 500 title for the year, beating Jean-Julien Rojer and Horia Tecău in the final. Venus said afterwards that the decider to win the title was possibly the best match tie-break they had ever played.

At the 2019 US Open (tennis), Venus again teamed with Klaasen as No. 3 seed in the men's doubles, and with Chan Hao-ching as No. 1 seed in the mixed doubles, the first time ever that a New Zealand player had been top seed in a Grand Slam event. In the men's doubles, Venus and Klaasen had an easy first round win against Adrian Mannarino and Gilles Simon, the latter being badly hampered by an injury which he had picked up in his previous singles match. In the second round, though, they were beaten in a major upset by Miomir Kecmanović and Casper Ruud, in a match where their percentage of first serves in play was way below their opponents' level.

In contrast to the men's doubles, Venus and Chan progressed majestically through their first four matches without dropping a set, beating Latisha Chan and Ivan Dodig, 7–6, 7–5, in the semifinal. In the final they came up against Bethanie Mattek-Sands and Jamie Murray who, incredibly, were not seeded, despite winning the previous year. The major difference between the pairs was that Chan could hold serve only once in the match, and the defending champions eventually won comfortably, 6–2, 6–3, in 59 minutes. It was Murray's third title in a row, having partnered Martina Hingis to beat Chan and Venus in 2017.

A week later Venus was in Jakarta for the Davis Cup tie against Indonesia, where he and Marcus Daniell had an easy win in the doubles rubber. Venus then headed to China, where he and Klaasen lost in the first round in Beijing to the eventual champions, Ivan Dodig and Filip Polášek. They lost in the quarterfinals of the Shanghai Masters to Jamie Murray and Neal Skupski, and then found Dodig and Polášek too strong once again, this time in Basel.

The last Masters tournament of the year is in Paris, where Venus and Klaasen were upset in the first round by Marcus Daniell and Philipp Oswald. They moved on to the ATP World Tour Finals in London, where they were seeded fifth. They won their first two round-robin matches before falling to Dodig and Polášek for a third successive time. They had already guaranteed themselves a semifinal position, though, where they beat the top seeds Cabal and Farah to gain revenge for their Wimbledon defeat. They had to save a match point at 8–9 in the second set tie-break, but won the first five points in the match tie-break on the way to a 6–7, 7–6, 10–6 victory. That put them up against the seventh seeds Pierre-Hugues Herbert and Nicolas Mahut in the final. Just one service break was required in each set, with both teams saving two deciding points before the French pair won 6–3, 6–4.

The bombshell announcement from Venus that the pair were to split, and that his new partner would be Australian John Peers, came the same day.

=== 2020: New partnership with Peers and three titles ===
Top seeds in their first appearance together, Venus and Peers were surprisingly beaten in two tie-break sets by Artem Sitak and Divij Sharan in the first round of the ASB Classic. They were seventh seeds in the Australian Open, losing in the third round to Marcelo Arévalo and Jonny O'Mara. Seeded fourth in the mixed doubles, Venus and Chan Hao-ching went out in the second round to Łukasz Kubot and Iga Świątek.

Venus and Peers then lost in the first round in Rotterdam before taking their first title as a pair, winning in Dubai over Klaasen and Oliver Marach. They did not drop a set in the entire tournament. This was Venus's last match before international tennis was suspended due to the COVID-19 coronavirus.

Venus and Peers started in the first ATP tournament after the tours resumed, the Western & Southern Open, this year held at Flushing Meadows as a lead-up to the US Open. They lost in the first round to Dan Evans and David Goffin. Unseeded in the US Open because of the draw size being cut to half the normal numbers, they lost in the second round to Sander Gillé and Joran Vliegen. They reached the semi-finals of the Italian Open, losing to Marcel Granollers and Horacio Zeballos, before winning the Hamburg European Open, defeating Ivan Dodig and Mate Pavić in the final.

Seeded 11th in the French Open, Venus and Peers were upset in the second round by Freddie Nielsen and Tim Pütz. They then went to the new ATP250 tournament in Santa Margherita di Pula, Sardinia, where they lost to eventual champions Marcus Daniell and Philipp Oswald in the semi-final. They collected their third title of the year just a week later, beating Rohan Bopanna and Matwé Middelkoop in the final of the European Open in Antwerp.

They lost in the first round in Vienna to French Open champions Kevin Krawietz and Andreas Mies, and in the quarter-finals of the Paris Masters to Félix Auger-Aliassime and Hubert Hurkacz, who would go on to win the title. Their final event for the season was the Nitto ATP Finals in London, where they lost all three of their round-robin matches in close contests.

=== 2021: New partnership with Putz, 15th & Masters titles, Olympics bronze ===
As was the case with so many other players, COVID-19 disrupted travel arrangements for Venus at the start of 2021. With his wife due to give birth to their second child in April, Venus elected to return home after the Australian Open, his only lead-up tournament being the Great Ocean Road Open due to the cancellation of the 2021 Auckland Open. With Peers unavailable before the Grand Slam event, Venus teamed up with Marcus Daniell, the pair losing in the quarterfinals. Seeded tenth, Venus and Peers lost in the third round of the Australian Open to the fifth-seeded defending champions, and eventual runners-up, Rajeev Ram and Joe Salisbury.

In July, with new partner Tim Pütz, he won his 15th title at the ATP 500 Hamburg European Open.

At the 2020 Summer Olympics he won the bronze medal in doubles with fellow New Zealander Marcus Daniell defeating Austin Krajicek and Tennys Sandgren.

He and Pütz got to the semifinals of the Indian Wells Masters, defeating second seeds Joe Salisbury/Rajeev Ram and fifth seeds Kevin Krawietz/Horia Tecău before losing to Russian Duo Andrey Rublev/Aslan Karatsev. He won his first ATP Masters 1000 title at the Paris Masters, again with Pütz. As a result, he reached No. 15 in doubles on 8 November 2021.

=== 2022: Second Australian Open quarterfinal & Masters final, world No. 6 ===
Seeded sixth, he reached the quarterfinals of the Australian Open partnering with Pütz where they were defeated by eventual champions Kokkinakis/Kyrgios. Seeded fourth at the 2022 Dubai Tennis Championships they won the ATP 500 title defeating top-ranked Nikola Mektić /Mate Pavić.

At the 2022 Halle Open he reached his third final of the season and fifth overall as a team with Putz.

After a final showing at the 2022 Western & Southern Open partnering again with Putz, he reached world No. 6 in the doubles rankings on 29 August 2022.

=== 2023–2024: New partnership with Murray and three ATP titles ===
Seeded as top pair with new partner Jamie Murray they won their first title at the Dallas Open. The team reached a Masters quarterfinal at the 2023 BNP Paribas Open.

After this run they then won their second title of the season at the Banja Luka Open. Their next two tournaments saw them reach back to back quarterfinals at the Masters events at the Madrid Open and Italian Open. In preparation for the French Open the team headed to the Geneva Open. They went on to win the tournament and their third title of the season with a straight sets victory over the third seeds and clay court specialist pairing of Marcel Granollers and Horacio Zeballos.

At the 2024 Queen's Club Championships, he combined with Neal Skupski to win the doubles title, defeating Taylor Fritz and Karen Khachanov in the final.

=== 2025: 25th doubles title in Auckland ===
Partnering with Nikola Mektić, Venus won his 25th doubles title at the Auckland Classic, receiving a walkover in the final when scheduled opponents Christian Harrison and Rajeev Ram withdrew due to Ram suffering an arm injury.

At the 2025 Miami Open the pair reached the semifinals but lost to top seeds and world No. 1 players Marcelo Arevalo and Mate Pavic.

== Significant finals ==
=== Grand Slam tournaments ===
==== Doubles: 2 (1 title, 1 runner-up) ====
Result	Year	Championship	Surface	Partner	Opponents	Score
Win	2017	French Open	Clay	(United States) Ryan Harrison	(Mexico) Santiago González (United States) Donald Young	7–6^{(7–5)}, 6–7^{(4–7)}, 6–3
Loss	2018	Wimbledon	Grass	(South Africa) Raven Klaasen	(United States) Mike Bryan (United States) Jack Sock	3–6, 7–6^{(9–7)}, 3–6, 7–5, 5–7

==== Mixed doubles: 3 (3 runners-up) ====
Result	Year	Championship	Surface	Partner	Opponents	Score
Loss	2017	US Open	Hard	(Chinese Taipei) Chan Hao-ching	(Switzerland) Martina Hingis (United Kingdom) Jamie Murray	1–6, 6–4, [8–10]
Loss	2019	US Open	Hard	(Chinese Taipei) Chan Hao-ching	(United States) Bethanie Mattek-Sands (United Kingdom) Jamie Murray	2–6, 3–6
Loss	2023	French Open	Clay	(Canada) Bianca Andreescu	(Japan) Miyu Kato (Germany) Tim Pütz	6–4, 4–6, [6–10]

=== Olympic medal finals ===
==== Doubles: 1 (bronze medal) ====
Result	Year	Tournament	Surface	Partner	Opponents	Score
Bronze	2021	Tokyo Summer Olympics	Hard	(New Zealand) Marcus Daniell	(United States) Austin Krajicek (United States) Tennys Sandgren	7–6^{(7–3)}, 6–2

=== Year-end championships ===
==== Doubles: 1 (runner-up) ====
Result	Year	Championship	Surface	Partner	Opponents	Score
Loss	2019	ATP World Tour Finals, London	Hard (i)	(South Africa) Raven Klaasen	(France) Pierre-Hugues Herbert (France) Nicolas Mahut	3–6, 4–6

=== Masters 1000 finals ===
==== Doubles: 5 (1 title, 4 runners-up) ====
Result	Year	Tournaments	Surface	Partner	Opponents	Score
Loss	2018	Toronto	Hard	(South Africa) Raven Klaasen	(Finland) Henri Kontinen (Australia) John Peers	2–6, 7–6^{(9–7)}, [6–10]
Loss	2019	Rome	Clay	(South Africa) Raven Klaasen	(Colombia) Juan Sebastián Cabal (Colombia) Robert Farah	1–6, 3–6
Win	2021	Paris	Hard (i)	(Germany) Tim Pütz	(France) Pierre-Hugues Herbert (France) Nicolas Mahut	6–3, 6–7^{(4–7)}, [11–9]
Loss	2022	Cincinnati	Hard	(Germany) Tim Pütz	(United States) Rajeev Ram (United Kingdom) Joe Salisbury	6–7^{(4–7)}, 6–7^{(5–7)}
Loss	2023	Cincinnati	Hard	(United Kingdom) Jamie Murray	(Argentina) Máximo González (Argentina) Andrés Molteni	6–3, 1–6, [9–11]

== ATP Tour career finals ==
=== Doubles: 50 (25 titles, 25 runner-ups) ===
Legend Grand Slam tournaments (1–1) ATP Finals (0–1) ATP Masters 1000 (1–4) ATP 500 (7–7) ATP 250 (16–12)	Finals by surface Hard (13–15) Clay (8–5) Grass (4–5)	Finals by setting Outdoor (17–18) Indoor (8–6)

Result	W–L	Date	Tournament	Tier	Surface	Partner	Opponents	Score
Win	1–0	May 2015	Open de Nice Côte d'Azur, France	250 Series	Clay	(Croatia) Mate Pavić	(Netherlands) Jean-Julien Rojer (Romania) Horia Tecău	7–6^{(7–4)}, 2–6, [10–7]
Loss	1–1	Jul 2015	Colombia Open, Colombia	250 Series	Hard	(Croatia) Mate Pavić	(France) Édouard Roger-Vasselin (Czech Republic) Radek Štěpánek	5–7, 3–6
Loss	1–2	Oct 2015	Stockholm Open, Sweden	250 Series	Hard (i)	(Croatia) Mate Pavić	(United States) Nicholas Monroe (United States) Jack Sock	5–7, 2–6
Win	2–2	Jan 2016	Auckland Open, New Zealand	250 Series	Hard	(Croatia) Mate Pavić	(United States) Eric Butorac (United States) Scott Lipsky	7–5, 6–4
Win	3–2	Feb 2016	Open Sud de France	250 Series	Hard (i)	(Croatia) Mate Pavić	(Germany) Alexander Zverev (Germany) Mischa Zverev	7–5, 7–6^{(7–4)}
Win	4–2	Feb 2016	Open 13, France	250 Series	Hard (i)	(Croatia) Mate Pavić	(Israel) Jonathan Erlich (United Kingdom) Colin Fleming	6–2, 6–3
Loss	4–3	May 2016	Open de Nice Côte d'Azur, France	250 Series	Clay	(Croatia) Mate Pavić	(Colombia) Juan Sebastián Cabal (Colombia) Robert Farah	6–4, 4–6, [8–10]
Win	5–3	Jun 2016	Rosmalen Championships, Netherlands	250 Series	Grass	(Croatia) Mate Pavić	(United Kingdom) Dominic Inglot (South Africa) Raven Klaasen	3–6, 6–3, [11–9]
Loss	5–4	Jul 2016	Swiss Open, Switzerland	250 Series	Clay	(Croatia) Mate Pavić	(Chile) Julio Peralta (Argentina) Horacio Zeballos	6–7^{(2–7)}, 2–6
Loss	5–5	Sep 2016	Moselle Open, France	250 Series	Hard	(Croatia) Mate Pavić	(Chile) Julio Peralta (Argentina) Horacio Zeballos	3–6, 6–7^{(4–7)}
Loss	5–6	Oct 2016	Stockholm Open, Sweden	250 Series	Hard (i)	(Croatia) Mate Pavić	(Sweden) Elias Ymer (Sweden) Mikael Ymer	1–6, 1–6
Loss	5–7	Oct 2016	Swiss Indoors, Switzerland	500 Series	Hard (i)	(Sweden) Robert Lindstedt	(Spain) Marcel Granollers (United States) Jack Sock	3–6, 4–6
Win	6–7	May 2017	Estoril Open, Portugal	250 Series	Clay	(United States) Ryan Harrison	(Spain) David Marrero (Spain) Tommy Robredo	7–5, 6–2
Win	7–7	Jun 2017	French Open	Grand Slam	Clay	(United States) Ryan Harrison	(Mexico) Santiago González (United States) Donald Young	7–6^{(7–5)}, 6–7^{(4–7)}, 6–3
Win	8–7	Feb 2018	Open 13, France (2)	250 Series	Hard (i)	(South Africa) Raven Klaasen	(New Zealand) Marcus Daniell (United Kingdom) Dominic Inglot	6–7^{(2–7)}, 6–3, [10–4]
Loss	8–8	Jun 2018	Rosmalen Championships, Netherlands	250 Series	Grass	(South Africa) Raven Klaasen	(United Kingdom) Dominic Inglot (Croatia) Franko Škugor	6–7^{(3–7)}, 5–7
Loss	8–9	Jul 2018	Wimbledon, United Kingdom	Grand Slam	Grass	(South Africa) Raven Klaasen	(United States) Mike Bryan (United States) Jack Sock	3–6, 7–6^{(9–7)}, 3–6, 7–5, 5–7
Loss	8–10	Aug 2018	Canadian Open	Masters 1000	Hard	(South Africa) Raven Klaasen	(Finland) Henri Kontinen (Australia) John Peers	2–6, 7–6^{(9–7)}, [6–10]
Loss	8–11	Oct 2018	Japan Open	500 Series	Hard (i)	(South Africa) Raven Klaasen	(Japan) Ben McLachlan (Germany) Jan-Lennard Struff	4–6, 5–7
Loss	8–12	Jan 2019	Auckland Open, New Zealand	250 Series	Hard	(South Africa) Raven Klaasen	(Japan) Ben McLachlan (Germany) Jan-Lennard Struff	3–6, 4–6
Loss	8–13	May 2019	Italian Open	Masters 1000	Clay	(South Africa) Raven Klaasen	(Colombia) Juan Sebastián Cabal (Colombia) Robert Farah	1–6, 3–6
Win	9–13	Jun 2019	Halle Open, Germany	500 Series	Grass	(South Africa) Raven Klaasen	(Poland) Łukasz Kubot (Brazil) Marcelo Melo	4–6, 6–3, [10–4]
Win	10–13	Aug 2019	Washington Open, United States	500 Series	Hard	(South Africa) Raven Klaasen	(Netherlands) Jean-Julien Rojer (Romania) Horia Tecău	3–6, 6–3, [10–2]
Loss	10–14	Nov 2019	ATP Finals, United Kingdom	ATP Finals	Hard (i)	(South Africa) Raven Klaasen	(France) Pierre-Hugues Herbert (France) Nicolas Mahut	3–6, 4–6
Win	11–14	Feb 2020	Dubai Championships, United Arab Emirates	500 Series	Hard	(Australia) John Peers	(South Africa) Raven Klaasen (Austria) Oliver Marach	6–3, 6–2
Win	12–14	Sep 2020	Hamburg European Open, Germany	500 Series	Clay	(Australia) John Peers	(Croatia) Ivan Dodig (Croatia) Mate Pavić	6–3, 6–4
Win	13–14	Oct 2020	European Open, Belgium	250 Series	Hard (i)	(Australia) John Peers	(India) Rohan Bopanna (Netherlands) Matwé Middelkoop	6–3, 6–4
Win	14–14	May 2021	Geneva Open, Switzerland	250 Series	Clay	(Australia) John Peers	(Italy) Simone Bolelli (Argentina) Máximo González	6–2, 7–5
Win	15–14	Jul 2021	Hamburg European Open, Germany (2)	500 Series	Clay	(Germany) Tim Pütz	(Germany) Kevin Krawietz (Romania) Horia Tecău	6–3, 6–7^{(3–7)}, [10–8]
Loss	15–15	Jul 2021	Washington Open, United States	500 Series	Hard	(United Kingdom) Neal Skupski	(South Africa) Raven Klaasen (Japan) Ben McLachlan	6–7^{(4–7)}, 4–6
Win	16–15	Nov 2021	Paris Masters, France	Masters 1000	Hard (i)	(Germany) Tim Pütz	(France) Pierre-Hugues Herbert (France) Nicolas Mahut	6–3, 6–7^{(4–7)}, [11–9]
Win	17–15	Feb 2022	Dubai Championships, United Arab Emirates (2)	500 Series	Hard	(Germany) Tim Pütz	(Croatia) Nikola Mektić (Croatia) Mate Pavić	6–3, 6–7^{(5–7)}, [16–14]
Loss	17–16	Jun 2022	Stuttgart Open, Germany	250 Series	Grass	(Germany) Tim Pütz	(Poland) Hubert Hurkacz (Croatia) Mate Pavić	6–7^{(3–7)}, 6–7^{(5–7)}
Loss	17–17	Jun 2022	Halle Open, Germany	500 Series	Grass	(Germany) Tim Pütz	(Spain) Marcel Granollers (Argentina) Horacio Zeballos	4–6^{(3–7)}, 7–6^{(7–5)}, [12–14]
Loss	17–18	Jul 2022	Kitzbühel Open, Austria	250 Series	Clay	(Germany) Tim Pütz	(Spain) Pedro Martínez (Italy) Lorenzo Sonego	7–5, 4–6, [8–10]
Loss	17–19	Aug 2022	Cincinnati Masters, United States	Masters 1000	Hard	(Germany) Tim Pütz	(United States) Rajeev Ram (United Kingdom) Joe Salisbury	6–7^{(4–7)}, 6–7^{(5–7)}
Loss	17–20	Jan 2023	Adelaide International 1, Australia	250 Series	Hard	(United Kingdom) Jamie Murray	(United Kingdom) Lloyd Glasspool (Finland) Harri Heliövaara	3–6, 6–7^{(3–7)}
Win	18–20	Feb 2023	Dallas Open, United States	250 Series	Hard (i)	(United Kingdom) Jamie Murray	(United States) Nathaniel Lammons (United States) Jackson Withrow	1–6, 7–6^{(7–4)}, [10–7]
Win	19–20	Apr 2023	Banja Luka Open, Bosnia and Herzegovina	250 Series	Clay	(United Kingdom) Jamie Murray	(Portugal) Francisco Cabral (Kazakhstan) Aleksandr Nedovyesov	7–5, 6–2
Win	20–20	May 2023	Geneva Open, Switzerland (2)	250 Series	Clay	(United Kingdom) Jamie Murray	(Spain) Marcel Granollers (Argentina) Horacio Zeballos	7–6^{(8–6)}, 7–6^{(7–3)}
Loss	20–21	Aug 2023	Cincinnati Masters, United States	Masters 1000	Hard	(United Kingdom) Jamie Murray	(Argentina) Máximo González (Argentina) Andrés Molteni	6–3, 1–6, [9–11]
Win	21–21	Sep 2023	Zhuhai Championships, China	250 Series	Hard (Note: Although Zhuhai is listed as an outdoor tournament, the secondary courts have roofs, even though the west side is open, and the Center Court is a fully covered stadium.)	(United Kingdom) Jamie Murray	(United States) Nathaniel Lammons (United States) Jackson Withrow	6–4, 6–4
Loss	21–22	Oct 2023	Japan Open	500 Series	Hard	(United Kingdom) Jamie Murray	(Australia) Rinky Hijikata (Australia) Max Purcell	4–6, 1–6
Win	22–22	Feb 2024	Qatar Open, Qatar	250 Series	Hard	(United Kingdom) Jamie Murray	(Italy) Lorenzo Musetti (Italy) Lorenzo Sonego	7–6^{(7–0)}, 2–6, [10–8]
Win	23–22	Jun 2024	Queen's Club Championships, United Kingdom	500 Series	Grass	(United Kingdom) Neal Skupski	(United States) Taylor Fritz; Karen Khachanov	4–6, 7–6^{(7–5)}, [10–8]
Win	24–22	Jun 2024	Eastbourne International, United Kingdom	250 Series	Grass	(United Kingdom) Neal Skupski	(Australia) Matthew Ebden (Australia) John Peers	4–6, 7–6^{(7–2)}, [11–9]
Loss	24–23	Oct 2024	Vienna Open, Austria	500 Series	Hard (i)	(United Kingdom) Neal Skupski	(Austria) Alexander Erler (Austria) Lucas Miedler	6–4, 3–6, [1–10]
Win	25–23	Jan 2025	Auckland Open, New Zealand (2)	250 Series	Hard	(Croatia) Nikola Mektić	(United States) Christian Harrison (United States) Rajeev Ram	Walkover
Loss	25–24	Jun 2025	Queen's Club Championships, United Kingdom	500 Series	Grass	(Croatia) Nikola Mektić	(United Kingdom) Julian Cash (United Kingdom) Lloyd Glasspool	3–6, 7–6^{(7–5)}, [6–10]
Loss	25–25	May 2026	Geneva Open, Switzerland	ATP 250	Clay	(India) Yuki Bhambri	(Monaco) Romain Arneodo (Australia) Marc Polmans	6–3, 6–7^{(2–7)}, [7–10]

== ATP Challenger and ITF Futures finals ==
=== Singles: 7 (3 titles, 4 runner-ups) ===
Legend
ATP Challenger Tour (0–1)
ITF Futures (3–3)

Result	W–L	Date	Tournament	Surface	Opponent	Score
Loss	0–1	18 June 2007	Bangkok, Thailand	Hard	(United States) Nathan Thompson	6–7^{(0–7)}, 3–6
Win	1–1	19 July 2009	Peoria, USA	Clay	(Canada) Vasek Pospisil	6–7^{(4–7)}, 6–4, 6–4
Win	2–1	13 June 2010	Loomis, USA	Hard	(Bulgaria) Dimitar Kutrovsky	7–6^{(7–4)}, 1–6, 6–3
Loss	2–2	21 August 2010	Qarshi, Uzbekistan	Hard	(Slovenia) Blaž Kavčič	6–7^{(6–8)}, 6–7^{(5–7)}
Loss	2–3	23 May 2011	Andijan, Uzbekistan	Hard	(Finland) Harri Heliövaara	4–6, 4–6
Loss	2–4	14 November 2011	Traralgon, Australia	Hard	(Australia) Benjamin Mitchell	6–7^{(3–7)}, 7–6^{(7–2)}, 0–6
Win	3–4	14 October 2012	Margaret River, Australia	Hard	(Australia) Adam Feeney	6–3, 3–6, 6–3

=== Doubles: 21 (12 titles, 9 runner-ups) ===
Legend
ATP Challenger Tour (8–8)
ITF Futures (4–1)

Result	No.	Date	Tournament	Surface	Partnering	Opponents	Score
Loss	1.	27 April 2008	Baton Rouge	Hard	(United States) Ryan Harrison	(United States) Phillip Simmonds (United States) Tim Smyczek	6–2, 1–6, [4–10]
Loss	2.	9 September 2012	Alice Springs F6	Hard	(Australia) Samuel Groth	(Australia) Adam Feeney (Australia) Nick Lindahl	6–4, 2–6, [8–10]
Win	1.	28 October 2012	Traralgon F11	Clay	(New Zealand) Rubin Statham	(Australia) Matthew Barton (Australia) Michael Look	3–6, 6–3, [11–9]
Win	2.	2 December 2012	Jakarta F3	Hard	(Germany) Tim Pütz	(Australia) Brydan Klein (Australia) Dane Propoggia	7–5, 6–3
Win	3.	24 March 2013	Costa Mesa F8	Hard	(United States) Michael McClune	(South Korea) Cho Min Hyeok (South Korea) Nam Ji Sung	6–1, 6–3
Win	4.	2 June 2013	Bacău F3	Clay	(United States) Bradley Klahn	(Poland) Piotr Gadomski (France) Tristan Lamasine	7–6^{(7–4)}, 6–7^{(4–7)}, [14–12]
Loss	3.	9 June 2013	Fürth	Clay	(United States) Christian Harrison	(Australia) Colin Ebelthite (Australia) Rameez Junaid	4–6, 5–7
Win	5.	7 July 2013	Winnetka	Hard	(India) Yuki Bhambri	(India) Somdev Devvarman (United States) Jack Sock	2–6, 6–2, [10–8]
Win	6.	21 July 2013	Binghamton	Hard	(United States) Bradley Klahn	(Australia) Adam Feeney (Australia) John-Patrick Smith	6–3, 6–4
Loss	4.	28 July 2013	Lexington	Hard	(United States) Bradley Klahn	(Canada) Frank Dancevic (Canada) Peter Polansky	3–6, 5–7
Win	7.	17 November 2013	Yokohama	Hard	(United States) Bradley Klahn	(Thailand) Sanchai Ratiwatana (Thailand) Sonchat Ratiwatana	7–5, 6–1
Win	8.	8 February 2014	Chennai	Hard	(India) Yuki Bhambri	(India) N. Sriram Balaji (Slovenia) Blaž Rola	7–6^{(7–5)}, 6–4
Loss	5.	9 March 2014	Kyoto	Hard (i)	(Thailand) Sanchai Ratiwatana	(India) Purav Raja (India) Divij Sharan	7–5, 6–7^{(3–7)}, [4–10]
Loss	6.	16 March 2014	Irving	Hard	(Australia) John-Patrick Smith	(Mexico) Santiago González (United States) Scott Lipsky	6–4, 6–7^{(7–9)}, [7–10]
Loss	7.	6 April 2014	Guadeloupe	Hard	(Germany) Gero Kretschmer	(Poland) Tomasz Bednarek (Canada) Adil Shamasdin	5–7, 7–6^{(7–5)}, [8–10]
Win	9.	27 April 2014	Savannah	Clay (green)	(Serbia) Ilija Bozoljac	(Argentina) Facundo Bagnis (Russia) Alex Bogomolov Jr.	7–5, 6–2
Win	10.	15 June 2014	Nottingham	Grass	(Australia) Rameez Junaid	(Belgium) Ruben Bemelmans (Japan) Go Soeda	4–6, 7–6^{(7–1)}, [10–6]
Win	11.	4 April 2015	Ra'anana	Hard	(Croatia) Mate Pavić	(Australia) Rameez Junaid (Canada) Adil Shamasdin	6–1, 6–4
Loss	8.	12 April 2015	Batman	Hard	(Croatia) Mate Pavić	(Russia) Aslan Karatsev (Belarus) Yaraslav Shyla	6–7^{(4–7)}, 6–4, [5–10]
Win	12.	19 April 2015	Mersin	Clay	(Croatia) Mate Pavić	(Italy) Riccardo Ghedin (India) Ramkumar Ramanathan	5–7, 6–3, [10–4]
Loss	9.	23 August 2015	Vancouver	Hard	(India) Yuki Bhambri	(Philippines) Treat Huey (Denmark) Frederik Nielsen	6–7^{(4–7)}, 7–6^{(7–3)}, [5–10]

== Davis Cup (32) ==
Group membership World Group (0) Group I (12–12) Group II (4–4) Group III (0) Group IV (0)	Results by surface Hard (12–15) Grass (1–0) Clay (3–1) Carpet (0–0)	Results by setting Outdoors (10–6) Indoors (6–10)

- ▲ ▼ indicates the outcome of the Davis Cup match followed by the score, date, place of event, the zonal classification and its phase, and the court surface.

Rubber outcome	No.	Rubber	Match type (partner if any)	Opponent nation	Opponent player(s)	Score
▲3–2; 9–11 July 2010; TSB Hub, Hāwera, New Zealand; Group II Asia/Oceania Second round; Hard (i) surface
Defeat	1.	II	Singles	Pakistan	Aisam-ul-Haq Qureshi	6–7^{(2–7)}, 6–4, 2–6, 6–2, 13–15
Defeat	2.	III	Doubles (with Marcus Daniell)	Pakistan	Aqeel Khan / Aisam-ul-Haq Qureshi	6–7^{(6–8)}, 3–6, 2–6
▲3–2; 17–19 September 2010; National Tennis Development Centre, Nonthaburi, Thailand; Group II Asia/Oceania Third round; Hard surface
Victory	1.	I	Singles	Thailand	Weerapat Doakmaiklee	6–3, 6–2, 7–6^{(7–1)}
Defeat	3.	III	Doubles (with Daniel King-Turner)	Thailand	Sanchai Ratiwatana / Sonchat Ratiwatana	6–0, 7–6^{(8–6)}, 0–6, 3–6, 4–6
Defeat	4.	IV	Singles	Thailand	Kittipong Wachiramanowong	5–7, 6–7^{(6–8)}, 2–6
▼2–3; 4–6 March 2011; Sport Complex Pahlavon, Namangan, Uzbekistan; Group I Asia/Oceania First round; Clay (i) surface
Defeat	5.	III	Doubles (with Marcus Daniell)	Uzbekistan	Farrukh Dustov / Denis Istomin	6–7^{(5–7)}, 3–6, 4–6
Victory	2.	V	Singles (dead rubber)	Uzbekistan	Vaja Uzakov	6–3, 6–0
▲5–0; 8–10 July 2011; TSB Hub, Hāwera, New Zealand; Group I Asia/Oceania First round play-off; Hard (i) surface
Victory	3.	II	Singles	Philippines	Cecil Mamiit	6–7^{(6–8)}, 7–6^{(7–4)}, 6–3, 4–6, 6–3
▼2–3; 10–12 February 2012; TECT Arena, Tauranga, New Zealand; Group I Asia/Oceania First round; Hard (i) surface
Defeat	6.	II	Singles	Uzbekistan	Farrukh Dustov	6–3, 1–6, 2–6, 2–6
Defeat	7.	III	Doubles (with Daniel King-Turner)	Uzbekistan	Farrukh Dustov / Denis Istomin	4–6, 6–7^{(4–7)}, 1–6
▼0–5; 14–16 September 2012; CLTA Tennis Stadium, Chandigarh, India; Group I Asia/Oceania First round play-off; Hard surface
Defeat	8.	III	Doubles (with Daniel King-Turner)	India	Vishnu Vardhan / Divij Sharan	6–7^{(3–7)}, 6–4, 3–6, 7–6^{(7–4)}, 3–6
▼2–3; 19–21 October 2012; Kaohsiung Yangming Tennis Courts, Kaohsiung, Taiwan; Group I Asia/Oceania Second round play-off; Hard surface
Defeat	9.	II	Singles	Chinese Taipei	Huang Liang-chi	4–6, 6–7^{(0–7)}, 3–6
▲3–2; 13–15 September 2013; Plantation Bay Resort & Spa, Lapu-Lapu, Philippines; Group II Asia/Oceania Third round; Hard surface
Victory	4.	I	Singles	Philippines	Ruben Gonzales	4–6, 6–3, 4–6, 7–6^{(7–4)}, 6–0
Victory	5.	V	Singles	Philippines	Treat Huey	5–7, 4–6, 6–3, 6–1, 6–3
▼1–3; 27–29 January 2014; Tianjin Tennis Center, Tianjin, China; Group I Asia/Oceania First round; Hard (i) surface
Defeat	10.	I	Singles	China	Wu Di	6–3, 6–7^{(4–7)}, 2–6, 6–1, 3–6
Victory	6.	III	Doubles (with Marcus Daniell)	China	Gong Maoxin / Li Zhe	6–3, 7–6^{(7–3)}, 7–5
▲4–1; 24–26 October 2014; Z Energy Wilding Park Tennis Centre, Christchurch, New Zealand; Group I Asia/Oceania Second round play-off; Hard (i) surface
Victory	7.	II	Singles	Chinese Taipei	Wang Chieh-fu	7–6^{(7–5)}, 7–6^{(7–3)}, 6–2
▲4–1; 6–8 March 2015; ASB Tennis Centre, Auckland, New Zealand; Group I Asia/Oceania First round; Hard surface
Victory	8.	I	Singles	China	Zhang Ze	6–1, 6–4, 3–6, 6–7^{(3–7)}, 9–7
Victory	9.	V	Singles (dead rubber)	China	Wang Chuhan	3–6, 7–6^{(7–2)}, 6–4
▼2–3; 17–19 July 2015; Wilding Park Tennis Centre, Christchurch, New Zealand; Group I Asia/Oceania Second round; Hard (i) surface
Victory	10.	I	Singles	India	Somdev Devvarman	4–6, 4–6, 6–3, 6–3, 6–1
Defeat	11.	V	Singles	India	Yuki Bhambri	2–6, 2–6, 3–6
▼1–3; 4–6 March 2016; Seoul Olympic Park Tennis Center, Seoul, South Korea; Group I Asia/Oceania Second round; Hard surface
Defeat	12.	II	Singles	South Korea	Chung Hyeon	4–6, 5–7, 1–6
Victory	11.	III	Doubles (with Artem Sitak)	South Korea	Lim Yong-kyu / Lee Duck-hee	7–6^{(7–3)}, 6–4, 4–6, 6–4
▲5–0; 16–18 September 2016; Wilding Park Tennis Centre, Christchurch, New Zealand; Group I Asia/Oceania Second round play-off; Hard (i) surface
Victory	12.	III	Doubles (with Marcus Daniell)	Pakistan	Mohammad Abid / Aqeel Khan	6–0, 6–1, 6–2
▼1–4; 3–5 February 2017; Balewadi Sports Complex, Pune, India; Group I Asia/Oceania First round; Hard surface
Victory	13.	III	Doubles (with Artem Sitak)	India	Leander Paes / Vishnu Vardhan	3–6, 6–3, 7–6^{(8–6)}, 6–3
▲3–2; 7–9 April 2017; ASB Tennis Centre, Auckland, New Zealand; Group I Asia/Oceania First round play-off; Hard surface
Defeat	13.	II	Singles	South Korea	Kwon Soon-woo	2–6, 2–6, 6–7^{(1–7)}
Victory	14.	V	Singles	South Korea	Hong Seong-chan	6–3, 3–6, 4–6, 6–2, 6–3
▼1–3; 1–3 February 2018; Tianjin Tennis Center, Tianjin, China; Group I Asia/Oceania First round; Hard (i) surface
Defeat	14.	II	Singles	China	Zhang Ze	7–5, 1–6, 2–6
▼2–3; 14–15 September 2018; Gimcheon Sports Town Tennis Courts, Gimcheon, South Korea; Group I Asia/Oceania Relegation playoff, 2nd round playoff; Hard (i) surface
Defeat	15.	II	Singles	South Korea	Lee Duck-hee	5–7, 7–6^{(9–7)}, 2–6
Defeat	16.	V	Singles	South Korea	Hong Seong-chan	6–7^{(5–7)}, 4–6
▲3–1; 14–15 September 2019; Gelora Bung Karno Sports Complex, Jakarta, Indonesia; Group II Asia/Oceania First round; Hard surface
Victory	15.	III	Doubles (with Marcus Daniell)	Indonesia	Anthony Susanto / David Agung Susanto	6–0, 6–2
▼1–3; 18–19 September 2021; International Tennis Hall of Fame, Newport, Rhode Island, USA; World Group I; Grass surface
Victory	16.	III	Doubles (with Marcus Daniell)	South Korea	Nam Ji-sung / Song Min-kyu	4–6, 6–2, 6–4

== Performance timelines ==
Key
W	F	SF	QF	#R	RR	Q#	P#	DNQ	A	Z#	PO	G	S	B	NMS	NTI	P	NH

(W) winner; (F) finalist; (SF) semifinalist; (QF) quarterfinalist; (#R) rounds 4, 3, 2, 1; (RR) round-robin stage; (Q#) qualification round; (P#) preliminary round; (DNQ) did not qualify; (A) absent; (Z#) Davis/Fed Cup Zonal Group (with number indication) or (PO) play-off; (G) gold, (S) silver or (B) bronze Olympic/Paralympic medal; (NMS) not a Masters tournament; (NTI) not a Tier I tournament; (P) postponed; (NH) not held; (SR) strike rate (events won / competed); (W–L) win–loss record.
To avoid confusion and double counting, these charts are updated at the conclusion of a tournament or when the player's participation has ended.

=== Doubles ===
Current through the 2025 US Open.

Tournament	2014	2015	2016	2017	2018	2019	2020	2021	2022	2023	2024	2025	SR	W–L
Grand Slam tournaments
Australian Open	3R	3R	1R	2R	1R	QF	3R	3R	QF	2R	1R	1R	0 / 12	15–12
French Open	1R	1R	1R	W	3R	1R	2R	2R	3R	3R	2R	2R	1 / 12	16–11
Wimbledon	1R	3R	3R	QF	F	SF	NH	1R	1R	QF	SF	1R	0 / 11	24–11
US Open	3R	2R	2R	1R	2R	2R	2R	1R	3R	2R	QF	SF	0 / 12	17–12
Win–loss	4–4	5–4	3–4	10–3	8–4	8–4	4–3	3–4	6–4	7–4	8–4	6–4	1 / 47	72–46
Year-end championships
ATP Finals	Did not qualify			SF	RR	F	RR	Alt	Alt	Did not qualify			0 / 4	7–8
ATP World Tour Masters 1000
Indian Wells Masters	A	A	A	1R	2R	QF	NH	SF	2R	QF	2R	1R	0 / 8	10–7
Miami Open	A	A	A	1R	QF	1R	NH	A	1R	2R	1R	SF	0 / 7	6–7
Monte-Carlo Masters	A	A	A	A	QF	A	NH	A	QF	1R	1R	1R	0 / 5	3–5
Madrid Open	A	A	A	A	QF	A	NH	1R	SF	QF	SF	QF	0 / 6	12–6
Italian Open	A	A	A	1R	2R	F	SF	SF	1R	QF	2R	1R	0 / 9	13–9
Canadian Open	A	A	A	1R	F	2R	NH	1R	1R	2R	2R	1R	0 / 8	7–8
Cincinnati Masters	A	A	A	SF	2R	QF	1R	QF	F	F	QF	1R	0 / 9	17–9
Shanghai Masters	A	A	A	2R	QF	QF	NH			2R	1R	A	0 / 5	4–5
Paris Masters	A	A	A	2R	QF	1R	QF	W	QF	2R	SF	A	1 / 8	13–7
Win–loss	0–0	0–0	0–0	4–7	15–9	10–7	4–3	13–5	10–8	13–9	11–8	5–7	1 / 65	85–63
National representation
Summer Olympics	Not Held		1R	Not Held				SF-B	Not Held		A	NH	0 / 2	3–2
Davis Cup	Z1	Z1	Z1	Z1	Z1	Z2	A	WG1	WG1	A	A	A	0 / 0	17–17
Win–loss	2–1	3–1	2–2	2–1	0–3	1–0	0–0	0–0	1–1	0–0	0–0	0–0	0 / 2	20–19
Career statistics
Titles / Finals	0 / 0	1 / 3	4 / 9	2 / 2	1 / 5	2 / 5	3 / 3	3 / 4	1 / 5	4 / 7	3 / 4	1 / 2	25 / 49	
Overall win–loss	9–14	22–19	41–18	29–30	40–26	37–21	22–13	34–16	34–24	46–24	36–24	25–21	377–257	
Year-end ranking	62	44	32	15	16	10	13	15	16	16	17	25	59%	

=== Mixed doubles ===
Although the US and French Opens took place in 2020, mixed doubles were not included in either event due to the COVID-19 coronavirus.

Tournament	2014	2015	2016	2017	2018	2019	2020	2021	2022	2023	2024	2025	W–L
Grand Slam tournaments
Australian Open	A	A	A	1R	2R	1R	2R	1R	QF	1R	2R	SF	8–9
French Open	A	A	A	2R	1R	1R	NH	A	A	F	QF	2R	8–6
Wimbledon	1R	3R	1R	3R	SF	2R	NH	A	1R	A	SF	1R	9–9
US Open	A	A	A	F	2R	F	NH	1R	2R	A	1R	A	10–6
Win–loss	0–1	2–1	0–1	6–4	5–4	4–4	1–1	0–2	3–3	4–2	6–4	4–3	35–30
