= Milan Welte =

German tennis player

- Country (sports): Germany
- Born: 30 June 2001 (age 24)
- Prize money: $30,255

Singles
- Career record: 0–0 (at ATP Tour level, Grand Slam level, and in Davis Cup)
- Career titles: 0
- Highest ranking: No. 863 (19 July 2021)
- Current ranking: No. 1082 (9 June 2025)

Doubles
- Career record: 0–1 (at ATP Tour level, Grand Slam level, and in Davis Cup)
- Career titles: 0
- Highest ranking: No. 875 (18 November 2024)
- Current ranking: No. 911 (9 June 2025)
- Last updated on: 9 June 2025.

Milan Welte (born 30 June 2001) is a German tennis player.

Welte has a career high ATP singles ranking of world No. 863, achieved on 19 July 2021.

Welte made his ATP main draw debut at the 2020 Hamburg European Open in the doubles draw partnering Marvin Möller after the pair received entry into the main draw as lucky losers.

== ITF World Tennis Tour finals ==
=== Singles: 1 (0–1) ===
Finals by surface
Hard (0–0)
Clay (0–1)

Result	W–L	Date	Tournament	Surface	Opponent	Score
Loss	0–1	Aug 2024	M15 Trier, Germany	Clay	(Germany) Justin Engel	1–6, 4–6

=== Doubles: 4 (1–3) ===
Finals by surface
Hard (0–0)
Clay (1–3)

Result	W–L	Date	Tournament	Surface	Partner	Opponents	Score
Loss	0–1	Sep 2021	M15 Allershausen, Germany	Clay	(Germany) Benito Sanchez Martinez	(Germany) Niklas Schell (Germany) Constantin Schmitz	6–7^{(5–7)}, 3–6
Loss	0–2	Aug 2023	M25 Wetzlar, Germany	Clay	(Germany) Lars Johann	(Germany) Tim Büttner (Germany) Niklas Schell	5–7, 4–6
Loss	0–3	Jun 2024	M15 Saarlouis, Germany	Clay	(Germany) Lars Johann	(Netherlands) Sidane Pontjodikromo (Netherlands) Niels Visker	6–4, 0–6, [7–10]
Win	1–3	Aug 2024	M15 Trier, Germany	Clay	(Germany) Lars Johann	(Germany) Tim Rühl (Germany) Patrick Zahraj	6–4, 2–6, [10–7]
