= Jamie Murray career statistics =

Career finals
Discipline	Type	Won	Lost	Total	WR
Doubles	Grand Slam tournaments	2	3	5	0.40
Doubles	Year-end championships	–	–	0	–
Doubles	ATP Masters 1000*	1	6	7	0.14
Doubles	Olympic Games	–	–	0	–
Doubles	ATP Tour 500	9	11	20	0.45
Doubles	ATP Tour 250	22	11	33	0.66
Doubles	Total	34	31	65	0.52
Mixed Doubles	Grand Slam tournaments	5	3	8	0.63
Mixed Doubles	Total	5	3	8	0.63
Mixed Doubles	Total	39	34	73	0.53
Mixed Doubles	1) WR=winning rate 2) * formerly known as "ATP Masters Series" (2004–2008).				

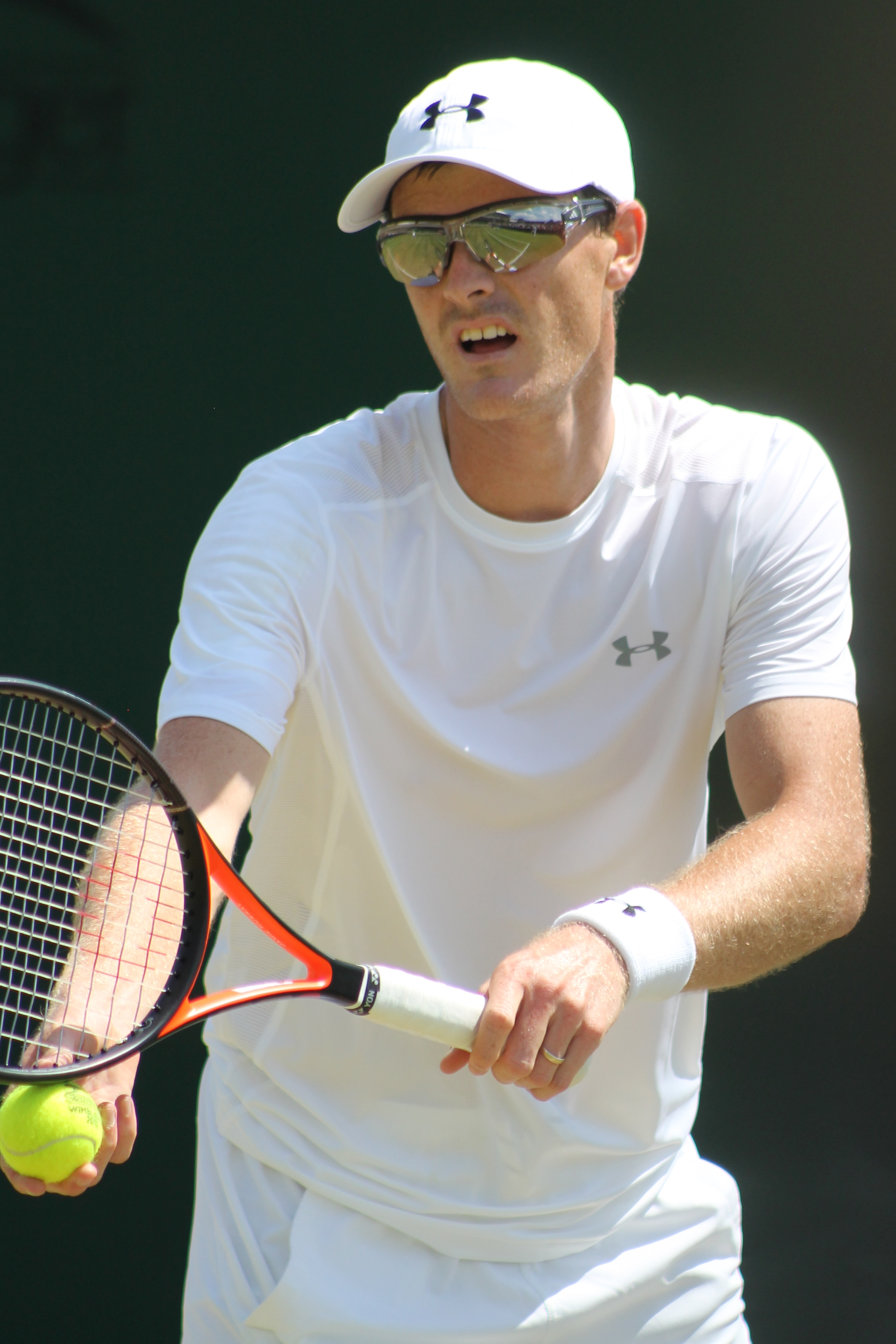
Murray has reached thirteen Grand Slam finals, winning the men's doubles at the 2016 Australian Open and the 2016 US Open, and the mixed doubles at the 2007 and 2017 Wimbledon Championships, and at the 2017, 2018, and 2019 US Open

Jamie Murray is a professional tennis player who is the current British number three doubles player. He reached thirteen grand slam finals in total: (5 Doubles, 8 Mixed), he won the mixed doubles at the 2007 and 2017 Wimbledon Championships, at the 2017, 2018, and 2019 US Open and the men's doubles at the 2016 Australian Open and 2016 US Open, and finished as runner-up in the men's doubles tournament at the 2015 Wimbledon Championships, 2015 US Open and 2021 US Open and in mixed doubles at the 2008 US Open and 2020 Australian Open. Murray was ranked as high as World No. 1 in the ATP doubles rankings, and was the first Britain to be ranked as world number one since the introduction of computerised world rankings in the 1970s.

Murray made his professional tennis debut on the main tour in Nottingham Open in 2006. In his career, Murray won a total of 39 titles (34 doubles and 5 mixed doubles titles).

Below is a list of career achievements and titles won by Jamie Murray.

== Performance timelines ==
Key
W	F	SF	QF	#R	RR	Q#	P#	DNQ	A	Z#	PO	G	S	B	NMS	NTI	P	NH

(W) winner; (F) finalist; (SF) semifinalist; (QF) quarterfinalist; (#R) rounds 4, 3, 2, 1; (RR) round-robin stage; (Q#) qualification round; (P#) preliminary round; (DNQ) did not qualify; (A) absent; (Z#) Davis/Fed Cup Zonal Group (with number indication) or (PO) play-off; (G) gold, (S) silver or (B) bronze Olympic/Paralympic medal; (NMS) not a Masters tournament; (NTI) not a Tier I tournament; (P) postponed; (NH) not held; (SR) strike rate (events won / competed); (W–L) win–loss record.
To avoid confusion and double counting, these charts are updated at the conclusion of a tournament or when the player's participation has ended.

=== Doubles ===
Current through the 2025 US Open.

Tournament	2006	2007	2008	2009	2010	2011	2012	2013	2014	2015	2016	2017	2018	2019	2020	2021	2022	2023	2024	2025	SR	W–L	Win %
Grand Slam tournaments
Australian Open	A	1R	1R	1R	A	2R	1R	1R	2R	3R	W	1R	2R	QF	2R	SF	3R	2R	1R	2R	1 / 18	23–17	58%
French Open	A	1R	1R	1R	1R	2R	1R	2R	3R	3R	3R	QF	2R	1R	QF	3R	2R	3R	2R	2R	0 / 19	22–19	54%
Wimbledon	1R	3R	3R	1R	1R	2R	2R	1R	3R	F	QF	2R	QF	1R	NH	2R	3R	QF	1R	1R	0 / 19	26–19	58%
US Open	A	2R	1R	A	A	1R	1R	QF	1R	F	W	QF	QF	SF	QF	F	2R	2R	1R	1R	1 / 17	34–16	68%
Win–loss	0–1	3–4	2–4	0–3	0–2	3–4	1–4	4–4	5–4	14–4	17–2	7–4	8–4	7–4	6–3	12–4	5–4	7–4	1–4	2–4	2 / 73	105–71	60%
Year-end championships
ATP Finals	did not qualify									RR	SF	SF	SF	DNQ		RR	did not qualify				0 / 5	9–9	50%
ATP World Tour Masters 1000
Indian Wells	A	2R	SF	1R	A	QF	2R	2R	1R	A	QF	SF	2R	1R	NH	1R	1R	QF	2R	2R	0 / 16	18–15	55%
Miami	A	1R	1R	1R	A	2R	1R	A	1R	2R	1R	QF	2R	2R	NH	2R	1R	2R	A	2R	0 / 15	9–15	38%
Monte Carlo	A	1R	1R	A	A	A	2R	A	A	1R	F	QF	2R	SF	NH	1R	SF	1R	1R	1R	0 / 13	11–13	46%
Madrid ^{1}	A	A	1R	A	A	1R	A	A	1R	QF	2R	QF	QF	QF	NH	1R	SF	QF	SF	2R	0 / 13	15–13	54%
Rome	A	A	2R	A	A	1R	A	A	A	QF	QF	2R	SF	1R	1R	1R	1R	QF	2R	1R	0 / 13	8–13	38%
Canada	A	1R	2R	A	A	QF	A	A	2R	QF	F	2R	2R	1R	NH	1R	1R	2R	1R	A	0 / 13	8–13	38%
Cincinnati	A	2R	QF	A	A	A	A	A	1R	2R	QF	F	W	SF	F	A	2R	F	SF	A	1 / 12	26–11	70%
Shanghai ^{2}	A	2R	1R	A	A	A	A	SF	1R	A	QF	SF	F	SF	not held			2R	QF	A	0 / 10	14–10	58%
Paris	A	1R	2R	A	A	2R	A	1R	A	2R	2R	SF	2R	QF	2R	SF	QF	2R	1R	A	0 / 14	13–14	48%
Win–loss	0–0	2–7	8–9	0–2	0–0	6–6	2–3	4–3	1–6	6–7	10–9	14–9	12–8	14–9	5–3	4–7	9–8	13–9	10–7	3–5	1 / 123	133–121	52%
National representation
Summer Olympics	not held		2R	not held			1R	not held			1R	not held				2R	not held		A	NH	0 / 4	2–4	33%
Davis Cup	A	PO	1R	absent		Z2	absent			W	SF	QF	1R	SF	NH	absent					1 / 6	14–6	70%
Win–loss	0–0	2–0	1–3	0–0	0–0	2–0	0–1	0–0	0–0	3–1	3–1	1–1	1–1	2–1	0–0	1–1	0–0	0–0	0–0	0–0	1 / 10	16–10	61%
Career statistics
	2006	2007	2008	2009	2010	2011	2012	2013	2014	2015	2016	2017	2018	2019	2020	2021	2022	2023	2024	2025	SR	W–L	Win %
Tournaments ^{3}	6	27	30	16	10	29	27	24	27	26	23	24	22	25	16	22	27	28	26	20	454		
Titles	0	3	1	0	1	2	0	3	1	2	3	3	3	1	1	2	1	4	3	0	34		
Finals reached	2	3	3	0	1	2	1	4	4	8	5	6	6	2	3	3	2	7	3	0	65		
Hard win–loss	7–3	18–15	15–17	3–9	4–1	28–17	11–15	21–13	16–15	24–16	33–13	32–15	29–11	28–16	20–14	23–12	14–15	29–17	24–13	7–10	25 / 276	386–257	60%
Grass win–loss	0–3	9–2	7–4	1–3	2–4	1–3	2–4	4–3	6–3	8–4	4–2	8–1	6–2	2–3	0–0	2–3	4–3	3–3	0–1	1–2	3 / 56	70–53	57%
Clay win–loss	0–0	2–6	7–9	1–4	2–4	1–6	6–8	11–5	15–7	14–6	8–5	7–7	6–7	8–6	3–3	3–6	12–8	13–4	8–8	1–2	6 / 114	129–111	54%
Carpet win–loss	0–0	1–1	1–1	Discontinued																	0 / 2	2–2	50%
Outdoor Win–loss	4–5	18–19	27–24	4–13	4–8	19–21	12–21	26–14	30–21	34–18	38–16	41–18	36–16	33–21	14–10	21–17	27–25	34–21	24–20	10–18	23 / 365	460–347	57%
Indoor win–loss	3–1	12–5	3–7	1–3	4–1	11–5	7–6	10–7	7–4	12–8	7–4	6–5	5–4	5–4	9–7	7–4	3–5	11–3	8–2	2–2	11 / 92	129–87	60%
Overall win–loss ^{4}	7–6	30–24	30–31	5–16	8–9	30–26	19–27	36–21	37–25	46–26	45–20	47–23	41–20	38–25	23–17	28–21	30–27	45–24	32–22	10–18	34 / 445	587–428	58%
Win (%)	54%	56%	49%	24%	47%	54%	41%	63%	60%	64%	69%	67%	67%	60%	54%	61%	53%	65%	59%	38%	57.83%		
Year-end ranking	77	32	28	105	57	35	75	30	42	7	4	9	7	23	24	19	36	16	27	85	$7,108,049		

^{1} Held as Hamburg Masters (outdoor clay) until 2008, Madrid Masters (outdoor clay) 2009 – present.
^{2} Held as Madrid Masters (indoor hard) until 2008, and Shanghai Masters (outdoor hard) 2009 – present.
^{3} Including appearances in Grand Slam and ATP World Tour main draw matches, and in Summer Olympics.
^{4} Including matches in Grand Slam, in ATP World Tour, in Summer Olympics and in Davis Cup.

=== Mixed doubles ===
Tournament	2007	2008	2009	2010	2011	2012	2013	2014	2015	2016	2017	2018	2019	2020	2021	2022	2023	2024	2025	SR	W–L	Win %
Grand Slam tournaments
Australian Open	A	2R	2R	A	1R	1R	A	1R	2R	QF	A	2R	QF	F	2R	A	QF	2R	1R	0 / 14	16–14	53%
French Open	A	QF	A	A	SF	A	A	1R	2R	QF	A	1R	A	NH	1R	A	2R	A	A	0 / 8	8–7	50%
Wimbledon	W	SF	SF	1R	2R	A	1R	QF	A	A	W	F	2R	NH	A	2R	2R	QF	1R	2 / 14	30–12	71%
US Open	SF	F	A	A	1R	A	A	2R	2R	A	W	W	W	NH	1R	1R	2R	A	A	3 / 11	25–8	75%
Win–loss	9–1	9–4	4–2	0–1	4–4	0–1	0–1	3–4	3–3	4–2	10–0	11–3	8–2	4–1	1–3	1–2	5–3	3–2	0–2	5 / 47	79–41	66%
National representation
Summer Olympics	not held					A	not held			1R	not held				A	NH		A	NH	0 / 1	0–1	0%
Overall win–loss	9–1	9–4	4–2	0–1	4–4	0–1	0–1	3–4	3–3	4–3	10–0	11–3	8–2	4–1	1–3	1–2	5–3	3–2	0–2	5 / 48	79–42	65%

== Grand Slam finals ==
=== Doubles: 5 (2 titles, 3 runner-ups) ===
Result	Year	Championship	Surface	Partner	Opponents	Score
Loss	2015	Wimbledon	Grass	(Australia) John Peers	(Netherlands) Jean-Julien Rojer (Romania) Horia Tecău	6–7^{(5–7)}, 4–6, 4–6
Loss	2015	US Open	Hard	(Australia) John Peers	(France) Pierre-Hugues Herbert (France) Nicolas Mahut	4–6, 4–6
Win	2016	Australian Open	Hard	(Brazil) Bruno Soares	(Canada) Daniel Nestor (Czech Republic) Radek Štěpánek	2–6, 6–4, 7–5
Win	2016	US Open	Hard	(Brazil) Bruno Soares	(Spain) Pablo Carreño Busta (Spain) Guillermo García López	6–2, 6–3
Loss	2021	US Open	Hard	(Brazil) Bruno Soares	(United States) Rajeev Ram (United Kingdom) Joe Salisbury	6–3, 2–6, 2–6

=== Mixed doubles: 8 (5 titles, 3 runner-ups) ===
Result	Year	Championship	Surface	Partner	Opponents	Score
Win	2007	Wimbledon	Grass	(Serbia) Jelena Janković	(Australia) Alicia Molik (Sweden) Jonas Björkman	6–4, 3–6, 6–1
Loss	2008	US Open	Hard	(United States) Liezel Huber	(Zimbabwe) Cara Black (India) Leander Paes	6–7^{(6–8)}, 4–6
Win	2017	Wimbledon (2)	Grass	(Switzerland) Martina Hingis	(United Kingdom) Heather Watson (Finland) Henri Kontinen	6–4, 6–4
Win	2017	US Open	Hard	(Switzerland) Martina Hingis	(Chinese Taipei) Chan Hao-ching (New Zealand) Michael Venus	6–1, 4–6, [10–8]
Loss	2018	Wimbledon	Grass	(Belarus) Victoria Azarenka	(United States) Nicole Melichar (Austria) Alexander Peya	6–7^{(1–7)}, 3–6
Win	2018	US Open (2)	Hard	(United States) Bethanie Mattek-Sands	(Poland) Alicja Rosolska (Croatia) Nikola Mektić	2–6, 6–3, [11–9]
Win	2019	US Open (3)	Hard	(United States) Bethanie Mattek-Sands	(Chinese Taipei) Chan Hao-ching (New Zealand) Michael Venus	6–2, 6–3
Loss	2020	Australian Open	Hard	(United States) Bethanie Mattek-Sands	(Czech Republic) Barbora Krejčíková (Croatia) Nikola Mektić	7–5, 4–6, [1–10]

== Other significant finals ==
=== Masters 1000 finals ===
==== Doubles: 7 (1 title, 6 runner-ups) ====
Result	Year	Championship	Surface	Partner	Opponents	Score
Loss	2016	Monte-Carlo Masters	Clay	(Brazil) Bruno Soares	(France) Pierre-Hugues Herbert (France) Nicolas Mahut	6–4, 0–6, [6–10]
Loss	2016	Canadian Open	Hard	(Brazil) Bruno Soares	(Croatia) Ivan Dodig (Brazil) Marcelo Melo	4–6, 4–6
Loss	2017	Cincinnati Masters	Hard	(Brazil) Bruno Soares	(France) Pierre-Hugues Herbert (France) Nicolas Mahut	6–7^{(6–8)}, 4–6
Win	2018	Cincinnati Masters	Hard	(Brazil) Bruno Soares	(Colombia) Juan Sebastián Cabal (Colombia) Robert Farah	4–6, 6–3, [10–6]
Loss	2018	Shanghai Masters	Hard	(Brazil) Bruno Soares	(Poland) Łukasz Kubot (Brazil) Marcelo Melo	4–6, 2–6
Loss	2020	Cincinnati Masters	Hard	(United Kingdom) Neal Skupski	(Spain) Pablo Carreño Busta (Australia) Alex de Minaur	2–6, 5–7
Loss	2023	Cincinnati Masters	Hard	(New Zealand) Michael Venus	(Argentina) Máximo González (Argentina) Andrés Molteni	6–3, 1–6, [9–11]

=== Team competitions finals ===
==== Davis Cup: 1 (1 title) ====
Result	Date	Tournament	Surface	Partner(s)	Opponents	Score
Win	Nov 2015	Davis Cup, Ghent, Belgium	Clay (i)	(United Kingdom) Andy Murray (United Kingdom) Kyle Edmund (United Kingdom) James Ward	(Belgium) David Goffin (Belgium) Steve Darcis (Belgium) Ruben Bemelmans (Belgium) Kimmer Coppejans	3–1

== ATP career finals ==
=== Doubles: 65 (34 titles, 31 runners-up) ===
Legend (pre/post 2009) Grand Slam tournaments (2–3) Tennis Masters Cup / ATP World Tour Finals (0–0) ATP Masters Series / ATP World Tour Masters 1000 (1–6) ATP International Series Gold / ATP World Tour 500 Series (9–11) ATP International Series / ATP World Tour 250 Series (22–11)	Finals by surface Hard (25–22) Clay (6–5) Grass (3–4) Carpet (0–0)	Finals by setting Outdoors (23–24) Indoors (11–7)

Result	W–L	Date	Tournament	Tier	Surface	Partner	Opponents	Score
Loss	0–1	Jul 2006	Los Angeles Open, United States	International	Hard	(United States) Eric Butorac	(United States) Bob Bryan (United States) Mike Bryan	2–6, 4–6
Loss	0–2	Oct 2006	Thailand Open, Thailand	International	Hard (i)	(United Kingdom) Andy Murray	(Israel) Jonathan Erlich (Israel) Andy Ram	2–6, 6–2, [4–10]
Win	1–2	Feb 2007	Pacific Coast Championships, United States	International	Hard (i)	(United States) Eric Butorac	(South Africa) Chris Haggard (Germany) Rainer Schüttler	7–5, 7–6^{(8–6)}
Win	2–2	Feb 2007	U.S. National Indoor Tennis Championships, United States	Intl. Gold	Hard (i)	(United States) Eric Butorac	(Austria) Jürgen Melzer (Austria) Julian Knowle	7–5, 6–3
Win	3–2	Jun 2007	Nottingham Open, United Kingdom	International	Grass	(United States) Eric Butorac	(United Kingdom) Joshua Goodall (United Kingdom) Ross Hutchins	4–6, 6–3, [10–5]
Win	4–2	Feb 2008	Delray Beach Open, United States	International	Hard	(Belarus) Max Mirnyi	(United States) Bob Bryan (United States) Mike Bryan	6–4, 3–6, [10–6]
Loss	4–3	Apr 2008	Estoril Open, Portugal	International	Clay	(Zimbabwe) Kevin Ullyett	(South Africa) Jeff Coetzee (South Africa) Wesley Moodie	2–6, 6–4, [8–10]
Loss	4–4	Jun 2008	Nottingham Open, United Kingdom	International	Grass (Note: The final itself was played on indoor hard due to rain.)	(South Africa) Jeff Coetzee	(Brazil) Bruno Soares (Zimbabwe) Kevin Ullyett	2–6, 6–7^{(5–7)}
Win	5–4	Nov 2010	Valencia Open, Spain	500 Series	Hard (i)	(United Kingdom) Andy Murray	(India) Mahesh Bhupathi (Belarus) Max Mirnyi	7–6^{(10–8)}, 5–7, [10–7]
Win	6–4	Sep 2011	Open de Moselle, France	250 Series	Hard (i)	(Brazil) André Sá	(Czech Republic) Lukáš Dlouhý (Brazil) Marcelo Melo	6–4, 7–6^{(9–7)}
Win	7–4	Oct 2011	Japan Open, Japan	500 Series	Hard	(United Kingdom) Andy Murray	(Czech Republic) František Čermák (Slovakia) Filip Polášek	6–1, 6–4
Loss	7–5	Feb 2012	Open Sud de France, France	250 Series	Hard (i)	(Australia) Paul Hanley	(France) Nicolas Mahut (France) Édouard Roger-Vasselin	4–6, 6–7^{(4–7)}
Win	8–5	Apr 2013	U.S. Men's Clay Court Championships, United States	250 Series	Clay	(Australia) John Peers	(United States) Bob Bryan (United States) Mike Bryan	1–6, 7–6^{(7–3)}, [12–10]
Win	9–5	Jul 2013	Swiss Open, Switzerland	250 Series	Clay	(Australia) John Peers	(Spain) Pablo Andújar (Spain) Guillermo García-López	6–3, 6–4
Win	10–5	Sep 2013	Thailand Open, Thailand	250 Series	Hard (i)	(Australia) John Peers	(Poland) Tomasz Bednarek (Sweden) Johan Brunström	6–3, 3–6, [10–6]
Loss	10–6	Oct 2013	Japan Open, Japan	500 Series	Hard	(Australia) John Peers	(India) Rohan Bopanna (France) Édouard Roger-Vasselin	6–7^{(5–7)}, 4–6
Win	11–6	May 2014	Bavarian International Tennis Championships, Germany	250 Series	Clay	(Australia) John Peers	(United Kingdom) Colin Fleming (United Kingdom) Ross Hutchins	6–4, 6–2
Loss	11–7	Jun 2014	Queen's Club Championships, United Kingdom	250 Series	Grass	(Australia) John Peers	(Austria) Alexander Peya (Brazil) Bruno Soares	6–4, 6–7^{(4–7)}, [4–10]
Loss	11–8	Aug 2014	Winston-Salem Open, United States	250 Series	Hard	(Australia) John Peers	(Colombia) Juan Sebastián Cabal (Colombia) Robert Farah	3–6, 4–6
Loss	11–9	Sep 2014	Malaysian Open, Malaysia	250 Series	Hard (i)	(Australia) John Peers	(Poland) Marcin Matkowski (India) Leander Paes	6–3, 6–7^{(5–7)}, [5–10]
Win	12–9	Jan 2015	Brisbane International, Australia	250 Series	Hard	(Australia) John Peers	(Ukraine) Alexandr Dolgopolov (Japan) Kei Nishikori	6–3, 7–6^{(7–4)}
Loss	12–10	Feb 2015	Rotterdam Open, Netherlands	500 Series	Hard (i)	(Australia) John Peers	(Netherlands) Jean-Julien Rojer (Romania) Horia Tecău	6–3, 3–6, [8–10]
Loss	12–11	Apr 2015	Barcelona Open, Spain	500 Series	Clay	(Australia) John Peers	(Croatia) Marin Draganja (Finland) Henri Kontinen	3–6, 7–6^{(8–6)}, [9–11]
Loss	12–12	Jul 2015	Wimbledon, United Kingdom	Grand Slam	Grass	(Australia) John Peers	(Netherlands) Jean-Julien Rojer (Romania) Horia Tecău	6–7^{(5–7)}, 4–6, 4–6
Win	13–12	Aug 2015	German Open, Germany	500 Series	Clay	(Australia) John Peers	(Colombia) Juan Sebastián Cabal (Colombia) Robert Farah	2–6, 6–3, [10–8]
Loss	13–13	Sep 2015	US Open, United States	Grand Slam	Hard	(Australia) John Peers	(France) Pierre-Hugues Herbert (France) Nicolas Mahut	4–6, 4–6
Loss	13–14	Oct 2015	Vienna Open, Austria	500 Series	Hard (i)	(Australia) John Peers	(Poland) Łukasz Kubot (Brazil) Marcelo Melo	6–4, 6–7^{(3–7)}, [6–10]
Loss	13–15	Nov 2015	Swiss Indoors, Switzerland	500 Series	Hard (i)	(Australia) John Peers	(Austria) Alexander Peya (Brazil) Bruno Soares	5–7, 5–7
Win	14–15	Jan 2016	Sydney International, Australia	250 Series	Hard	(Brazil) Bruno Soares	(India) Rohan Bopanna (Romania) Florin Mergea	6–3, 7–6^{(8–6)}
Win	15–15	Jan 2016	Australian Open, Australia	Grand Slam	Hard	(Brazil) Bruno Soares	(Canada) Daniel Nestor (Czech Republic) Radek Štěpánek	2–6, 6–4, 7–5
Loss	15–16	Apr 2016	Monte-Carlo Masters, Monaco	Masters 1000	Clay	(Brazil) Bruno Soares	(France) Pierre-Hugues Herbert (France) Nicolas Mahut	6–4, 0–6, [6–10]
Loss	15–17	Jul 2016	Canadian Open, Canada	Masters 1000	Hard	(Brazil) Bruno Soares	(Croatia) Ivan Dodig (Brazil) Marcelo Melo	4–6, 4–6
Win	16–17	Sep 2016	US Open, United States	Grand Slam	Hard	(Brazil) Bruno Soares	(Spain) Pablo Carreño Busta (Spain) Guillermo García-López	6–2, 6–3
Loss	16–18	Jan 2017	Sydney International, Australia	250 Series	Hard	(Brazil) Bruno Soares	(Netherlands) Wesley Koolhof (Netherlands) Matwé Middelkoop	3–6, 5–7
Win	17–18	Mar 2017	Mexican Open, Mexico	500 Series	Hard	(Brazil) Bruno Soares	(United States) John Isner (Spain) Feliciano López	6–3, 6–3
Win	18–18	Jun 2017	Stuttgart Open, Germany	250 Series	Grass	(Brazil) Bruno Soares	(Austria) Oliver Marach (Croatia) Mate Pavić	6–7^{(4–7)}, 7–5, [10–5]
Win	19–18	Jun 2017	Queen's Club Championships, United Kingdom	500 Series	Grass	(Brazil) Bruno Soares	(France) Julien Benneteau (France) Édouard Roger-Vasselin	6–2, 6–3
Loss	19–19	Aug 2017	Cincinnati Masters, United States	Masters 1000	Hard	(Brazil) Bruno Soares	(France) Pierre-Hugues Herbert (France) Nicolas Mahut	6–7^{(6–8)}, 4–6
Loss	19–20	Oct 2017	Japan Open, Japan	500 Series	Hard	(Brazil) Bruno Soares	(Japan) Ben McLachlan (Japan) Yasutaka Uchiyama	4–6, 6–7^{(1–7)}
Loss	19–21	Jan 2018	Qatar Open, Qatar	250 Series	Hard	(Brazil) Bruno Soares	(Austria) Oliver Marach (Croatia) Mate Pavić	2–6, 6–7^{(6–8)}
Win	20–21	Mar 2018	Mexican Open, Mexico (2)	500 Series	Hard	(Brazil) Bruno Soares	(United States) Bob Bryan (United States) Mike Bryan	7–6^{(7–4)}, 7–5
Loss	20–22	Jun 2018	Queen's Club Championships, United Kingdom	500 Series	Grass	(Brazil) Bruno Soares	(Finland) Henri Kontinen (Australia) John Peers	4–6, 3–6
Win	21–22	Aug 2018	Washington Open, United States	500 Series	Hard	(Brazil) Bruno Soares	(United States) Mike Bryan (France) Édouard Roger-Vasselin	3–6, 6–3, [10–4]
Win	22–22	Aug 2018	Cincinnati Masters, United States	Masters 1000	Hard	(Brazil) Bruno Soares	(Colombia) Juan Sebastián Cabal (Colombia) Robert Farah	4–6, 6–3, [10–6]
Loss	22–23	Oct 2018	Shanghai Masters, China	Masters 1000	Hard	(Brazil) Bruno Soares	(Poland) Łukasz Kubot (Brazil) Marcelo Melo	4–6, 2–6
Win	23–23	Jan 2019	Sydney International, Australia (2)	250 Series	Hard	(Brazil) Bruno Soares	(Colombia) Juan Sebastián Cabal (Colombia) Robert Farah	6–4, 6–3
Loss	23–24	Apr 2019	Barcelona Open, Spain	500 Series	Clay	(Brazil) Bruno Soares	(Colombia) Juan Sebastián Cabal (Colombia) Robert Farah	4–6, 6–7^{(4–7)}
Loss	23–25	Aug 2020	Cincinnati Masters, United States	Masters 1000	Hard	(United Kingdom) Neal Skupski	(Spain) Pablo Carreño Busta (Australia) Alex de Minaur	2–6, 5–7
Loss	23–26	Nov 2020	Vienna Open, Austria	500 Series	Hard (i)	(United Kingdom) Neal Skupski	(Poland) Łukasz Kubot (Brazil) Marcelo Melo	6–7^{(5–7)}, 5–7
Win	24–26	Nov 2020	Sofia Open, Bulgaria	250 Series	Hard (i)	(United Kingdom) Neal Skupski	(Austria) Jürgen Melzer (France) Édouard Roger-Vasselin	Walkover
Win	25–26	Feb 2021	Great Ocean Road Open, Australia	250 Series	Hard	(Brazil) Bruno Soares	(Colombia) Juan Sebastián Cabal (Colombia) Robert Farah	6–3, 7–6^{(9–7)}
Loss	25–27	Sep 2021	US Open, United States	Grand Slam	Hard	(Brazil) Bruno Soares	(United States) Rajeev Ram (United Kingdom) Joe Salisbury	6–3, 2–6, 2–6
Win	26–27	Oct 2021	St. Petersburg Open, Russia	250 Series	Hard (i)	(Brazil) Bruno Soares	(Kazakhstan) Andrey Golubev (Monaco) Hugo Nys	6–3, 6–4
Loss	26–28	Feb 2022	Rio Open, Brazil	500 Series	Clay	(Brazil) Bruno Soares	(Italy) Simone Bolelli (Italy) Fabio Fognini	5–7, 7–6^{(7–2)}, [6–10]
Win	27–28	Aug 2022	Winston-Salem Open, United States	250 Series	Hard	(Australia) Matthew Ebden	(Monaco) Hugo Nys (Poland) Jan Zieliński	6–4, 6–2
Loss	27–29	Jan 2023	Adelaide International 1, Australia	250 Series	Hard	(New Zealand) Michael Venus	(United Kingdom) Lloyd Glasspool (Finland) Harri Heliövaara	3–6, 6–7^{(3–7)}
Win	28–29	Feb 2023	Dallas Open, United States	250 Series	Hard (i)	(New Zealand) Michael Venus	(United States) Nathaniel Lammons (United States) Jackson Withrow	1–6, 7–6^{(7–4)}, [10–7]
Win	29–29	Apr 2023	Banja Luka Open, Bosnia and Herzegovina	250 Series	Clay	(New Zealand) Michael Venus	(Portugal) Francisco Cabral (Kazakhstan) Aleksandr Nedovyesov	7–5, 6–2
Win	30–29	May 2023	Geneva Open, Switzerland	250 Series	Clay	(New Zealand) Michael Venus	(Spain) Marcel Granollers (Argentina) Horacio Zeballos	7–6^{(8–6)}, 7–6^{(7–3)}
Loss	30–30	Aug 2023	Cincinnati Masters, United States	Masters 1000	Hard	(New Zealand) Michael Venus	(Argentina) Máximo González (Argentina) Andrés Molteni	6–3, 1–6, [9–11]
Win	31–30	Sep 2023	Zhuhai Championships, China	250 Series	Hard (i)	(New Zealand) Michael Venus	(United States) Nathaniel Lammons (United States) Jackson Withrow	6–4, 6–4
Loss	31–31	Oct 2023	Japan Open, Japan	500 Series	Hard	(New Zealand) Michael Venus	(Australia) Rinky Hijikata (Australia) Max Purcell	4–6, 1–6
Win	32–31	Feb 2024	Qatar Open, Qatar	250 Series	Hard	(New Zealand) Michael Venus	(Italy) Lorenzo Musetti (Italy) Lorenzo Sonego	7–6^{(7–0)}, 2–6, [10–8]
Win	33–31	Oct 2024	Swiss Indoors, Switzerland	500 Series	Hard (i)	(Australia) John Peers	(Netherlands) Wesley Koolhof (Croatia) Nikola Mektić	6–3, 7–5
Win	34–31	Nov 2024	Belgrade Open, Serbia	250 Series	Hard (i)	(Australia) John Peers	(Croatia) Ivan Dodig (Tunisia) Skander Mansouri	3–6, 7–6^{(7–5)}, [11–9]

== ATP Challengers & ITF Futures finals ==
=== Doubles: 31 (18 titles, 13 runners-up) ===
Legend
ATP Challenger Tour (12–10)
ITF Futures (6–3)

Result	W–L	Date	Tournament	Tier	Surface	Partner	Opponents	Score
Loss	0–1	Oct 2004	Great Britain F5, Edinburgh	Futures	Hard (i)	(United Kingdom) Tom Burn	(United Kingdom) Richard Bloomfield (United Kingdom) Chris Lewis	4–6, 1–6
Loss	0–2	Jul 2005	Great Britain F9, Frinton-on-Sea	Futures	Grass	(United Kingdom) Colin Fleming	(United Kingdom) Neil Bamford (United Kingdom) Edward Corrie	5–7, 4–6
Win	1–2	Sep 2005	Great Britain F10, Nottingham	Futures	Hard	(United Kingdom) Colin Fleming	(France) Olivier Charroin (Norway) Frederick Sundsten	7–6^{(7–4)}, 6–3
Win	2–2	Sep 2005	Great Britain F12, Glasgow	Futures	Hard (i)	(United Kingdom) Colin Fleming	(United Kingdom) David Corrie (United Kingdom) Jim May	6–4, 6–4
Win	3–2	Oct 2005	Great Britiain F13, Edinburgh	Futures	Hard (i)	(United Kingdom) Colin Fleming	(United Kingdom) Matthew Lott (United Kingdom) Gary Thomson	6–3, 6–3
Win	4–2	Oct 2005	Great Britain F14, Bolton	Futures	Hard (i)	(United Kingdom) Ross Hutchins	(Germany) Roman Herold (Germany) Benedikt Stronk	4–6, 7–6^{(7–2)}, 6–4
Win	5–2	Nov 2005	Canada F2, Rimouski	Futures	Hard (i)	(United Kingdom) Ross Hutchins	(United Kingdom) Lee Childs (Norway) Frederick Sundsten	7–6^{(7–5)}, 7–6^{(8–6)}
Win	6–2	Jan 2006	Great Britain F1, Exmouth	Futures	Carpet (i)	(United Kingdom) Colin Fleming	(United Kingdom) Josh Goodall (United Kingdom) Ross Hutchins	6–3, 3–6, 6–3
Loss	6–3	Jan 2006	Great Britain F2, Barnstaple	Futures	Hard (i)	(United Kingdom) Colin Fleming	(United Kingdom) Josh Goodall (United Kingdom) Ross Hutchins	6–7^{(3–7)}, 7–6^{(8–6)}, 6–7^{(4–7)}
Loss	6–4	Jan 2006	Wrexham Challenger, United Kingdom	Challenger	Hard (i)	(United Kingdom) Colin Fleming	(France) Jean-François Bachelot (France) Stéphane Robert	4–6, 5–7
Loss	6–5	Jul 2006	Dublin Challenger, Ireland	Challenger	Carpet (i)	(United Kingdom) Colin Fleming	(Netherlands) Jasper Smit (Netherlands) Martijn van Haasteren	3–6, 6–2, [8–10]
Loss	6–6	Aug 2006	Binghamton Challenger, United States	Challenger	Hard	(United Kingdom) Colin Fleming	(United States) Scott Lipsky (United States) David Martin	5–7, 7–5, [3–10]
Win	7–6	Sep 2006	Como Challenger, Italy	Challenger	Clay	(United Kingdom) Jamie Delgado	(Romania) Victor Crivoi (Romania) Gabriel Moraru	6–2, 4–6, [10–7]
Loss	7–7	Sep 2006	Genoa Challenger, Italy	Challenger	Clay	(United Kingdom) Jamie Delgado	(Italy) Adriano Biasella (Argentina) Marcelo Charpentier	4–6, 6–4, [11–13]
Loss	7–8	Oct 2006	Nottingham Challenger 2, United Kingdom	Challenger	Hard (i)	(United Kingdom) Jamie Delgado	(Sweden) Filip Prpic (France) Nicolas Tourte	4–6, 6–4, [7–10]
Loss	7–9	Nov 2006	Bratislava Challenger, Slovakia	Challenger	Hard (i)	(Australia) Jordan Kerr	(United States) Eric Butorac (United States) Travis Parrott	5–7, 3–6
Win	8–9	Feb 2007	Dallas Challenger, United States	Challenger	Hard (i)	(United States) Eric Butorac	(United States) Rajeev Ram (United States) Bobby Reynolds	6–4, 6–7^{(4–7)}, [10–7]
Win	9–9	Aug 2009	Trani Challenger, Italy	Challenger	Clay	(United Kingdom) Jamie Delgado	(Germany) Simon Greul (Italy) Alessandro Motti	3–6, 6–4, [12–10]
Win	10–9	Sep 2009	Alphen Challenger, Netherlands	Challenger	Clay	(United Kingdom) Jonathan Marray	(Ukraine) Sergei Bubka (Ukraine) Sergiy Stakhovsky	6–1, 6–4
Win	11–9	Sep 2009	Ljubljana Challenger, Slovenia	Challenger	Clay	(United Kingdom) Jamie Delgado	(France) Stéphane Robert (Italy) Simone Vagnozzi	6–3, 6–3
Win	12–9	Nov 2009	Astana Challenger, Kazakhstan	Challenger	Hard (i)	(United Kingdom) Jonathan Marray	(United States) David Martin (Netherlands) Rogier Wassen	4–6, 6–3, [10–5]
Win	13–9	Jan 2010	Salinas Challenger, Ecuador	Challenger	Hard	(United Kingdom) Jonathan Marray	(Thailand) Sanchai Ratiwatana (Thailand) Sonchat Ratiwatana	6–3, 6–4
Win	14–9	Feb 2010	Bergamo Challenger, Italy	Challenger	Hard (i)	(United Kingdom) Jonathan Marray	(Slovakia) Karol Beck (Czech Republic) Jiří Krkoška	6–1, 6–7^{(2–7)}, [10–8]
Loss	14–10	Mar 2010	Jersey Challenger, Channel Islands	Challenger	Hard (i)	(United Kingdom) Jonathan Marray	(India) Rohan Bopanna (United Kingdom) Ken Skupski	6–2, 2–6, [10–6]
Loss	14–11	May 2010	Rhodes Challenger, Greece	Challenger	Hard	(United Kingdom) Jonathan Marray	(Jamaica) Dustin Brown (Germany) Simon Stadler	6–7^{(4–7)}, 7–6^{(7–4)}, [7–10]
Win	15–11	Oct 2010	Tashkent Challenger, Uzbekistan	Challenger	Hard	(United Kingdom) Ross Hutchins	(Slovakia) Karol Beck (Slovakia) Filip Polášek	2–6, 6–4, [10–8]
Win	16–11	Nov 2010	Bratislava Challenger, Slovakia	Challenger	Hard (i)	(United Kingdom) Colin Fleming	(United States) Travis Parrott (Slovakia) Filip Polášek	6–2, 3–6, [10–6]
Loss	16–12	Sep 2012	Pétange Challenger, Luxembourg	Challenger	Hard (i)	(Brazil) André Sá	(Germany) Christopher Kas (Belgium) Dick Norman	6–2, 2–6, [8–10]
Win	17–12	Jun 2013	Nottingham Challenger, United Kingdom	Challenger	Grass	(Australia) John Peers	(United Kingdom) Ken Skupski (United Kingdom) Neal Skupski	6–2, 6–7^{(3–7)}, [10–6]
Win	18–12	Mar 2019	Phoenix Challenger, United States	Challenger	Hard	(United Kingdom) Neal Skupski	(United States) Austin Krajicek (New Zealand) Artem Sitak	6–7^{(2–7)}, 7–5, [10–6]
Loss	18–13	Sep 2019	Glasgow Challenger, United Kingdom	Challenger	Hard (i)	(Australia) John-Patrick Smith	(Belgium) Ruben Bemelmans (Germany) Daniel Masur	6–4, 3–6, [8–10]

== Record against other players ==
=== Top 10 wins ===
Type	2006	2007	2008	2009	2010	2011	2012	2013	2014	2015	2016	2017	2018	2019	2020	2021	2022	2023	2024	2025	Total
Wins	0	0	6	0	0	1	1	3	2	6	8	4	7	7	5	3	3	6	3	2	67

#	Opponents	Rank	Event	Surface	Rd	Score	Partner	JM Rank
2008
1.	(Czech Republic) František Čermák (Czech Republic) Lukáš Dlouhý	31; 9	Doha, Qatar	Hard	1R	7–5, 7–5	(Belarus) Max Mirnyi	32
2.	(United States) Bob Bryan (United States) Mike Bryan	1; 1	Delray Beach, United States	Hard	F	6–4, 3–6, [10–6]	(Belarus) Max Mirnyi	35
3.	(United States) Bob Bryan (United States) Mike Bryan	1; 1	Indian Wells, United States	Hard	QF	5–7, 6–4, [10–6]	(Belarus) Max Mirnyi	40
4.	(Austria) Julian Knowle (Austria) Jürgen Melzer	8; 65	Estoril, Portugal	Clay	1R	6–2, 6–7^{(5–7)}, [10–6]	(Zimbabwe) Kevin Ullyett	34
5.	(Czech Republic) Martin Damm (Czech Republic) Pavel Vízner	22; 9	Cincinnati, United States	Hard	1R	6–3, 7–6^{(7–5)}	(Sweden) Simon Aspelin	32
6.	(Canada) Daniel Nestor (Canada) Frédéric Niemeyer	1; 533	Olympics, Beijing, China	Hard	1R	4–6, 6–3, 6–4	(United Kingdom) Andy Murray	29
2011
7.	(India) Mahesh Bhupathi (Spain) Marcel Granollers	5; 20	Rotterdam, Netherlands	Hard (i)	QF	6–2, 6–3	(United Kingdom) Andy Murray	53
2012
8.	(Pakistan) Aisam-ul-Haq Qureshi (Netherlands) Jean-Julien Rojer	10; 36	Dubai, United Arab Emirates	Hard	1R	4–6, 7–6^{(14–12)}, [10–6]	(Australia) Paul Hanley	38
2013
9.	(Sweden) Robert Lindstedt (Serbia) Nenad Zimonjić	7; 20	Indian Wells, United States	Hard	1R	6–4, 4–6, [10–4]	(United Kingdom) Andy Murray	90
10.	(United States) Bob Bryan (United States) Mike Bryan	1; 1	Houston, United States	Clay	F	1–6, 7–6^{(7–3)}, [12–10]	(Australia) John Peers	84
11.	(Italy) Daniele Bracciali (India) Leander Paes	45; 6	Bangkok, Thailand	Hard (i)	SF	6–3, 6–4	(Australia) John Peers	37
2014
12.	(United States) Bob Bryan (United States) Mike Bryan	1; 1	London, United Kingdom	Grass	2R	7–6^{(8–6)}, 7–6^{(7–3)}	(Australia) John Peers	32
13.	(France) Julien Benneteau (France) Édouard Roger-Vasselin	12; 9	London, United Kingdom	Grass	SF	6–4, 7–6^{(7–4)}	(Australia) John Peers	32
2015
14.	(Croatia) Ivan Dodig (Brazil) Marcelo Melo	6; 3	Madrid, Spain	Clay	2R	7–6^{(7–2)}, 6–2	(Australia) John Peers	26
15.	(Poland) Marcin Matkowski (Serbia) Nenad Zimonjić	20; 5	Rome, Italy	Clay	2R	7–6^{(7–4)}, 7–5	(Australia) John Peers	25
16.	(Canada) Vasek Pospisil (United States) Jack Sock	5; 6	Wimbledon, London, United Kingdom	Grass	3R	6–3, 7–6^{(8–6)}, 6–7^{(5–7)}, 3–6, 8–6	(Australia) John Peers	28
17.	(Poland) Marcin Matkowski (Serbia) Nenad Zimonjić	7; 9	US Open, New York, United States	Hard	QF	3–6, 6–3, 7–6^{(7–4)}	(Australia) John Peers	15
18.	(United States) Mike Bryan (United States) Steve Johnson	1; 52	Vienna, Austria	Hard (i)	1R	7–6^{(10–8)}, 6–3	(Australia) John Peers	8
19.	(Italy) Simone Bolelli (Italy) Fabio Fognini	9; 11	ATP World Tour Finals, London, United Kingdom	Hard (i)	RR	7–6^{(7–5)}, 3–6, [11–9]	(Australia) John Peers	7
2016
20.	(India) Rohan Bopanna (Romania) Florin Mergea	9; 11	Sydney, Australia	Hard	F	6–3, 7–6^{(8–6)}	(Brazil) Bruno Soares	7
21.	(Finland) Henri Kontinen (Australia) John Peers	34; 9	Dubai, United Arab Emirates	Hard	1R	2–6, 6–4, [10–8]	(Spain) Tommy Robredo	2
22.	(Croatia) Ivan Dodig (Brazil) Marcelo Melo	9; 2	Monte Carlo, Monaco	Clay	SF	6–2, 6–4	(Brazil) Bruno Soares	1
23.	(South Africa) Raven Klaasen (United States) Rajeev Ram	10; 25	Toronto, Canada	Hard	QF	3–6, 7–5, [10–4]	(Brazil) Bruno Soares	5
24.	(Canada) Daniel Nestor (Canada) Vasek Pospisil	8; 22	Toronto, Canada	Hard	SF	6–4, 6–7^{(5–7)}, [10–7]	(Brazil) Bruno Soares	5
25.	(France) Pierre-Hugues Herbert (France) Nicolas Mahut	2; 1	US Open, New York, United States	Hard	SF	7–5, 4–6, 6–3	(Brazil) Bruno Soares	4
26.	(United States) Bob Bryan (United States) Mike Bryan	5; 5	ATP World Tour Finals, London, United Kingdom	Hard (i)	RR	6–3, 6–4	(Brazil) Bruno Soares	4
27.	(Croatia) Ivan Dodig (Brazil) Marcelo Melo	11; 7	ATP World Tour Finals, London, United Kingdom	Hard (i)	RR	6–3, 3–6, [10–6]	(Brazil) Bruno Soares	4
2017
28.	(Poland) Łukasz Kubot (Brazil) Marcelo Melo	4; 1	Cincinnati, United States	Hard	SF	6–4, 7–5	(Brazil) Bruno Soares	6
29.	(France) Pierre-Hugues Herbert (France) Nicolas Mahut	7; 5	Paris, France	Hard (i)	QF	6–4, 3–6, [12–10]	(Brazil) Bruno Soares	9
30.	(Croatia) Ivan Dodig (Spain) Marcel Granollers	5; 14	ATP Finals, London, United Kingdom	Hard (i)	RR	6–1, 6–1	(Brazil) Bruno Soares	9
31.	(Poland) Łukasz Kubot (Brazil) Marcelo Melo	2; 1	ATP Finals, London, United Kingdom	Hard (i)	RR	6–2, 6–4	(Brazil) Bruno Soares	9
2018
32.	(Netherlands) Robin Haase (Netherlands) Jean-Julien Rojer	59; 9	Madrid, Spain	Clay	2R	6–4, 3–6, [10–6]	(Brazil) Bruno Soares	13
33.	(Finland) Henri Kontinen (Australia) John Peers	8; 7	Rome, Italy	Clay	QF	6–4, 2–6, [10–5]	(Brazil) Bruno Soares	12
34.	(Austria) Oliver Marach (Croatia) Mate Pavić	2; 1	London, United Kingdom	Grass	SF	6–3, 6–7^{(6–8)}, [10–7]	(Brazil) Bruno Soares	13
35.	(United States) Mike Bryan (France) Édouard Roger-Vasselin	1; 29	Washington, United States	Hard	F	3–6, 6–3, [10–4]	(Brazil) Bruno Soares	13
36.	(Netherlands) Jean-Julien Rojer (Romania) Horia Tecău	9; 16	Cincinnati, United States	Hard	SF	6–7^{(7–9)}, 6–2, [10–6]	(Brazil) Bruno Soares	7
38.	(Colombia) Juan Sebastián Cabal (Colombia) Robert Farah	8; 7	Shanghai, China	Hard	SF	6–3, 6–4	(Brazil) Bruno Soares	9
39.	(Colombia) Juan Sebastián Cabal (Colombia) Robert Farah	5; 5	ATP Finals, London, United Kingdom	Hard (i)	RR	6–4, 6–3	(Brazil) Bruno Soares	9
2019
40.	(Colombia) Juan Sebastián Cabal (Colombia) Robert Farah	5; 5	Sydney, Australia	Hard	F	6–4, 6–3	(Brazil) Bruno Soares	7
40.	(France) Nicolas Mahut (France) Édouard Roger-Vasselin	6; 21	Washington, United States	Hard	1R	6–4, 6–7^{(7–9)}, [10–5]	(United Kingdom) Andy Murray	8
41.	(France) Pierre-Hugues Herbert (France) Nicolas Mahut	19; 6	Cincinnati, United States	Hard	2R	6–3, 6–3	(United Kingdom) Neal Skupski	12
42.	(United States) Jack Sock (United States) Jackson Withrow	10; 106	US Open, New York, United States	Hard	QF	4–6, 6–1, 7–6^{(7–4)}	(United Kingdom) Neal Skupski	21
43.	(Colombia) Juan Sebastián Cabal (Colombia) Robert Farah	1; 1	Beijing, China	Hard	QF	6–4, 6–2	(United Kingdom) Neal Skupski	13
44.	(South Africa) Raven Klaasen (New Zealand) Michael Venus	9; 13	Shanghai, China	Hard	QF	6–3, 7–6^{(7–5)}	(United Kingdom) Neal Skupski	10
45.	(Spain) Marcel Granollers (Argentina) Horacio Zeballos	7; 4	Paris, France	Hard (i)	2R	6–3, 3–6, [11–9]	(United Kingdom) Neal Skupski	20
2020
46.	(Colombia) Juan Sebastián Cabal (Colombia) Robert Farah	2; 1	Cincinnati, United States	Hard	1R	7–6^{(7–5)}, 7–6^{(7–3)}	(United Kingdom) Neal Skupski	26
47.	(United States) Rajeev Ram (United Kingdom) Joe Salisbury	9; 7	Cincinnati, United States	Hard	SF	7–5, 6–3	(United Kingdom) Neal Skupski	26
48.	(Croatia) Ivan Dodig (Slovakia) Filip Polášek	10; 9	US Open, New York, United States	Hard	1R	6–3, 7–5	(United Kingdom) Neal Skupski	24
49.	(Spain) Marcel Granollers (Argentina) Horacio Zeballos	7; 3	French Open, Paris, France	Clay	3R	6–3, 4–6, 6–4	(United Kingdom) Neal Skupski	27
50.	(Colombia) Robert Farah (France) Fabrice Martin	1; 24	Vienna, Austria	Hard (i)	SF	6–4, 6–4	(United Kingdom) Neal Skupski	25
2021
51.	(Colombia) Juan Sebastián Cabal (Colombia) Robert Farah	2; 1	Melbourne 1, Australia	Hard	F	6–3, 7–6^{(9–7)}	(Brazil) Bruno Soares	23
52.	(Argentina) Andrés Molteni (Argentina) Horacio Zeballos	65; 4	Olympics, Tokyo, Japan	Hard	1R	6–7^{(3–7)}, 6–4, [13–11]	(United Kingdom) Neal Skupski	22
53.	(Spain) Marcel Granollers (Argentina) Horacio Zeballos	5; 4	US Open, New York, United States	Hard	QF	6–7^{(5–7)}, 6–4, 6–4	(Brazil) Bruno Soares	22
2022
54.	(Spain) Marcel Granollers (Argentina) Horacio Zeballos	7; 6	Rio de Janeiro, Brazil	Clay	SF	6–3, 6–2	(Brazil) Bruno Soares	21
55.	(Spain) Marcel Granollers (Argentina) Horacio Zeballos	6; 5	Monte Carlo, Monaco	Clay	QF	7–6^{(10–8)}, 7–6^{(10–8)}	(India) Rohan Bopanna	21
56.	(El Salvador) Marcelo Arévalo (Netherlands) Jean-Julien Rojer	6; 5	Paris, France	Hard (i)	2R	3–6, 6–3, [10–5]	(Australia) Matthew Ebden	34
2023
57.	(El Salvador) Marcelo Arévalo (Netherlands) Jean-Julien Rojer	7; 7	Miami, United States	Hard	1R	7–6^{(12–10)}, 6–4	(New Zealand) Michael Venus	32
58.	(United States) Rajeev Ram (United Kingdom) Joe Salisbury	4; 5	Madrid, Spain	Clay	1R	6–2, 3–6, [10–4]	(New Zealand) Michael Venus	34
59.	(El Salvador) Marcelo Arévalo (Netherlands) Jean-Julien Rojer	7; 7	Rome, Italy	Clay	1R	7–6^{(9–7)}, 4–6, [10–2]	(New Zealand) Michael Venus	40
60.	(Monaco) Hugo Nys (Poland) Jan Zieliński	13; 7	Wimbledon, London, United Kingdom	Grass	3R	6–4, 6–3	(New Zealand) Michael Venus	33
61.	(Netherlands) Wesley Koolhof (United Kingdom) Neal Skupski	1; 1	Cincinnati, United States	Hard	2R	7–6^{(7–3)}, 6–7^{(3–7)}, [10–1]	(New Zealand) Michael Venus	29
62.	(Mexico) Santiago González (France) Édouard Roger-Vasselin	14; 10	Cincinnati, United States	Hard	SF	6–3, 6–4	(New Zealand) Michael Venus	29
2024
63.	(Netherlands) Wesley Koolhof (Croatia) Nikola Mektić	6; 32	Doha, Qatar	Hard	QF	6–4, 7–6^{(7–2)}	(New Zealand) Michael Venus	18
64.	(Italy) Simone Bolelli (Italy) Andrea Vavassori	10; 9	Cincinnati, United States	Hard	2R	7–5, 7–6^{(7–4)}	(Croatia) Ivan Dodig	33
65.	(Spain) Marcel Granollers (Argentina) Horacio Zeballos	1; 1	Shanghai, China	Hard	2R	6–7^{(6–8)}, 6–4, [10–6]	(Australia) John Peers	37
2025
66.	(Germany) Kevin Krawietz (Germany) Tim Pütz	5; 6	Dubai, United Arab Emirates	Hard	QF	6–3, 7–6^{(7–4)}	(Australia) John Peers	29
67.	(Spain) Marcel Granollers (Argentina) Horacio Zeballos	10; 11	Miami, United States	Hard	1R	7–6^{(7–5)}, 3–6, [10–7]	(Czech Republic) Adam Pavlásek	24

== Career Grand Slam tournament seedings ==
The tournaments won by Murray are in boldface.

Year	Australian Open	French Open	Wimbledon	US Open
2006	did not play	did not play	wildcard	did not play
2007	not seeded	not seeded	not seeded	16th
2008	12th	12th	14th	14th
2009	16th	not seeded	not seeded	did not play
2010	did not play	alternate	wild card	did not play
2011	not seeded	not seeded	not seeded	not seeded
2012	16th	not seeded	14th	not seeded
2013	not seeded	not seeded	not seeded	not seeded
2014	15th	15th	14th	15th
2015	16th	11th	13th (1)	8th (2)
2016	**7th (1)**	4th	3rd	**4th (2)**
2017	2nd	5th	3rd	4th
2018	5th	4th	5th	4th
2019	3rd	2nd	10th	15th
2020	14th	13th	not held	not seeded
2021	6th	7th	7th	7th (3)
2022	8th	10th	9th	10th
2023	11th	13th	13th	12th
2024	9th	13th	wildcard	not seeded
2025	12th	13th	not seeded	not seeded

== National participation ==
=== Davis Cup ===
==== Participations: (14–7) ====
Group membership World Group / Finals (9–5) WG Play-off (2–1) Group I (1–1) Group II (2–0) Group III (0) Group IV (0)	Matches by Surface Hard (10–4) Clay (2–3) Grass (2–0)	Matches by Type Singles (0–1) Doubles (14–6)

- ▲ ▼ indicates the outcome of the Davis Cup match followed by the score, date, place of event, the zonal classification and its phase, and the court surface.

Rubber outcome	No.	Rubber	Match type (partner if any)	Opponent nation	Opponent player(s)	Score
▲4–1; 6–8 April 2007; National Exhibition Centre, Birmingham, Great Britain; Group I Europe/Africa Quarter-final; Hard(i) surface
Victory	1	III	Doubles (with Greg Rusedski)	Netherlands	Robin Haase / Rogier Wassen	6–1, 3–6, 6–3, 7–6^{(7–5)}
Defeat	2	IV	Singles (dead rubber)	Netherlands	Robin Haase	6–4, 6–7^{(0–7)}, 2–6
▲4–1; 21–23 September 2007; All England Lawn Tennis and Croquet Club, London, Great Britain; World Group Play-off; Grass surface
Victory	3	III	Doubles (with Tim Henman)	Croatia	Lovro Zovko / Marin Čilić	4–6, 6–4, 7–6^{(7–3)}, 7–5
▼4–1; 8–10 February 2008; Estadio Parque Roca, Buenos Aires, Argentina; World Group First round; Clay surface
Defeat	4	III	Doubles (with Ross Hutchins)	Argentina	José Acasuso / David Nalbandian	2–6, 6–7^{(11–13)}, 0–6
▼2–3; 19–21 September 2008; All England Lawn Tennis and Croquet Club, London, Great Britain; World Group Play-off; Grass surface
Defeat	5	III	Doubles (with Ross Hutchins)	Austria	Julian Knowle / Jürgen Melzer	4–6, 3–6, 1–6
▲4–1; 4–6 March 2011; Bolton Arena, Bolton, Great Britain; Group II Europe/Africa First round; Hard (i) surface
Victory	6	III	Doubles (with Colin Fleming)	Tunisia	Slim Hamza / Malek Jaziri	6–1, 3–6, 6–3, 6–4
▲4–1; 8–10 July 2011; Braehead Arena, Glasgow, Great Britain; Group II Europe/Africa Second round; Hard (i) surface
Victory	7	III	Doubles (with Andy Murray)	Luxembourg	Laurent Bram / Mike Vermeer	7–5, 6–2, 6–0
▲3–2; 6–8 March 2015; Emirates Arena, Glasgow, Great Britain; World Group First round; Hard (i) surface
Defeat	8	III	Doubles (with Dominic Inglot)	United States	Bob Bryan / Mike Bryan	3–6, 2–6, 6–3, 7–6^{(10–8)}, 7–9
▲3–1; 17–19 July 2015; Queen's Club, London, Great Britain; World Group Quarter-final; Grass surface
Victory	9	III	Doubles (with Andy Murray)	France	Nicolas Mahut / Jo-Wilfried Tsonga	4–6, 6–3, 7–6^{(7–5)}, 6–1
▲3–2; 18–20 September 2015; Emirates Arena, Glasgow, Great Britain; World Group Semi-final; Hard (i) surface
Victory	10	III	Doubles (with Andy Murray)	Australia	Sam Groth / Lleyton Hewitt	4–6, 6–3, 6–4, 6–7^{(6–8)}, 6–4
▲3–1; 27–29 November 2015; Flanders Expo, Ghent, Belgium; World Group Final; Clay (i) surface
Victory	11	III	Doubles (with Andy Murray)	Belgium	Steve Darcis / David Goffin	6–4, 4–6, 6–3, 6–2
▲3–1; 4–6 March 2016; Barclaycard Arena, Birmingham, United Kingdom; World Group First-round; Hard (i) surface
Victory	12	III	Doubles (with Andy Murray)	Japan	Yoshihito Nishioka / Yasutaka Uchiyama	6–3, 6–2, 6–4
▲3–2; 15–17 July 2016; Tašmajdan Stadium, Belgrade, Serbia; World Group Quarter-final; Clay surface
Victory	13	III	Doubles (with Dominic Inglot)	Serbia	Filip Krajinović / Nenad Zimonjić	6–1, 6–7^{(2–7)}, 6–3, 6–4
▼2–3; 16–18 September 2016; Emirates Arena, Glasgow, Great Britain; World Group Semi-final; Hard (i) surface
Victory	14	III	Doubles (with Andy Murray)	Argentina	Juan Martín del Potro / Leonardo Mayer	6–1, 3–6, 6–4, 6–4
▲3–2; 3–5 February 2017; TD Place Arena, Ottawa, Canada; World Group First round; Hard (i) surface
Victory	15	III	Doubles (with Dominic Inglot)	Canada	Daniel Nestor / Vasek Pospisil	7–6^{(7–1)}, 6–7^{(3–7)}, 7–6^{(7–3)}, 6–3
▼1–4; 7–9 April 2017; Kindarena, Rouen, France; World Group Quarter-final; Clay (i) surface
Defeat	16	III	Doubles (with Dominic Inglot)	France	Julien Benneteau / Nicolas Mahut	6–7^{(7–9)}, 7–5, 5–7, 5–7
▼1–3; 2–4 February 2018; Club de Tenis Puente Romano, Marbella, Spain; World Group First round; Clay surface
Defeat	17	III	Doubles (with Dominic Inglot)	Spain	Pablo Carreño Busta / Feliciano López	4–6, 4–6, 6–7^{(4–7)}
▲3–1; 14–16 September 2018; Emirates Arena, Glasgow, Great Britain; World Group Play-off; Hard (i) surface
Victory	18	III	Doubles (with Dominic Inglot)	Uzbekistan	Sanjar Fayziev / Denis Istomin	4–6, 7–6^{(10–8)}, 6–2, 6–3
▲2–1; 20 November 2019; Caja Mágica, Madrid, Spain; Finals Group E; Hard (i) surface
Victory	19	III	Doubles (with Neal Skupski)	Netherlands	Wesley Koolhof / Jean-Julien Rojer	6–4, 7–6^{(8–6)}
▲2–1; 21 November 2019; Caja Mágica, Madrid, Spain; Finals Group E; Hard (i) surface
Victory	20	III	Doubles (with Neal Skupski)	Kazakhstan	Alexander Bublik / Mikhail Kukushkin	6–1, 6–4
▼1–2; 23 November 2019; Caja Mágica, Madrid, Spain; Finals Semi-final; Hard (i) surface
Defeat	21	III	Doubles (with Neal Skupski)	Spain	Feliciano López / Rafael Nadal	6–7^{(3–7)}, 6–7^{(8–10)}

===== Wins: 1 =====
Edition	(United Kingdom) British Team	Rounds/Opponents
2015 Davis Cup	Jamie Murray; Andy Murray; Kyle Edmund; James Ward; Daniel Evans; Dominic Inglot	1R: GBR 3–2 USA; QF: GBR 3–1 FRA; SF: GBR 3–2 AUS; F: GBR 3–1 BEL

=== Summer Olympics ===
==== Doubles: (2–4) ====
Result	No.	Year	Partner	Country	Opponent	Surface	Rd	Score
Win	1.	2008	Andy Murray	(Canada) CAN	Daniel Nestor; Frédéric Niemeyer	Hard	1R	4–6, 6–3, 6–4
Loss	1.	2008	Andy Murray	(France) FRA	Arnaud Clément; Michaël Llodra	Hard	2R	1–6, 3–6
Loss	2.	2012	Andy Murray	(Austria) AUT	Jürgen Melzer; Alexander Peya	Grass	1R	7–5, 6–7^{(6–8)}, 5–7
Loss	3.	2016	Andy Murray	(Brazil) BRA	Thomaz Bellucci; André Sá	Hard	1R	6–7^{(6–8)}, 6–7^{(14–16)}
Win	2.	2020	Neal Skupski	(Argentina) ARG	Andrés Molteni; Horacio Zeballos	Hard	1R	6–7^{(3–7)}, 6–4, [13–11]
Loss	4.	2020	Neal Skupski	(Japan) JPN	Ben McLachlan; Kei Nishikori	Hard	2R	3–6, 4–6

==== Mixed Doubles: (0–1) ====
Result	No.	Year	Partner	Country	Opponent	Surface	Rd	Score
Loss	1.	2016	Johanna Konta	(United States) USA	Bethanie Mattek-Sands; Jack Sock	Hard	1R	4–6, 3–6

=== Commonwealth Games ===
==== Singles (1–1) ====
Result	No.	Year	Country	Opponent	Surface	Rd	Score
Win	1.	2010	(The Bahamas) BAH	Rodney Carey	Hard	1R	6–2, 7–5
Loss	1.	2010	(England) ENG	James Ward	Hard	2R	5–7, 0–6

==== Doubles: (0–1) ====
Result	No.	Year	Partner	Country	Opponent	Surface	Rd	Score
Loss	1.	2010	Colin Fleming	(India) IND	Rohan Bopanna; Somdev Devvarman	Hard	1R	3–6, 1–6

==== Mixed Doubles: (1–1) ====
Result	No.	Year	Partner	Country	Opponent	Surface	Rd	Score
Win	1.	2010	Mhairi Brown	(Uganda) UGA	Jalia Nanfuka; Duncan Mugabe	Hard	1R	6–4, 6–2
Loss	1.	2010	Mhairi Brown	(Australia) AUS	Anastasia Rodionova; Paul Hanley	Hard	2R	3–6, 4–6
