= Artem Sitak =

New Zealand tennis player (born 1986)

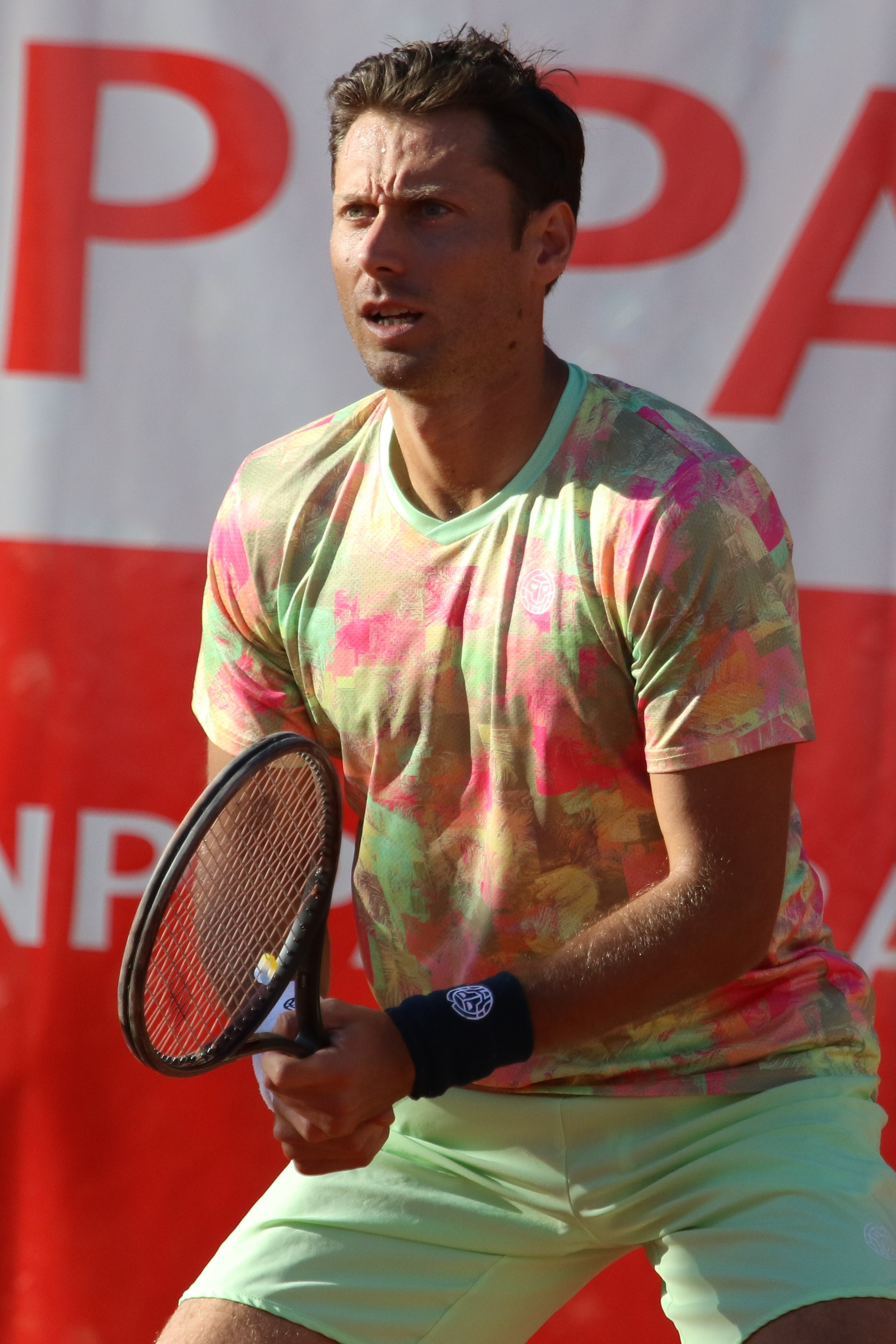
- Sitak at the 2022 BNP Paribas Primrose Bordeaux
- Country (sports): Russia (2002–2010); New Zealand (2011–)
- Residence: Auckland, New Zealand
- Born: 8 February 1986 (age 40) Orenburg, Russia (then part of Soviet Union)
- Height: 1.85 m (6 ft 1 in)
- Turned pro: 2001
- Retired: January 2024
- Plays: Right-handed (two-handed backhand)
- Prize money: US $1,194,577

Singles
- Career record: 5–6
- Career titles: 0
- Highest ranking: No. 299 (11 August 2008)

Grand Slam singles results
- Australian Open Junior: 1R (2003)
- Wimbledon Junior: 1R (2002)

Doubles
- Career record: 155–174
- Career titles: 5
- Highest ranking: No. 32 (10 September 2018)

Grand Slam doubles results
- Australian Open: 3R (2015)
- French Open: 3R (2018)
- Wimbledon: QF (2018)
- US Open: 2R (2014, 2016, 2018)

Grand Slam mixed doubles results
- Australian Open: 1R (2016, 2018, 2019)
- French Open: 2R (2017)
- Wimbledon: QF (2019)
- US Open: 2R (2017)

Artem Sitak
Medal record

Tennis

Representing Russia

Summer Universiade
Gold medal – first place	2005 Izmir	Singles
Gold medal – first place	2005 Izmir	Doubles

Artem Yurievich Sitak (/ˈɑːrtəm ˈsɪtæk/ ART-əm SIT-ak; Russian: Артём Юрьевич Ситак, romanized: Artyom Sitak; born 8 February 1986) is a Russian-born New Zealand former professional tennis player. On 11 August 2008, he reached his highest ATP singles ranking of World No. 299, whilst his highest doubles ranking of World No. 32 was reached on 10 September 2018, after the US Open. He is the younger brother of Dmitri Sitak, who was also a professional tennis player.

== Junior years ==
Coached during the 1990s by Santini, as a 13-year-old in 1999, Sitak received a wildcard into the main draw of an ITF junior tournament in Russia as a 13-year-old in 1999. He was defeated by Evgeni Smirnov 6–4, 6–1. The following year he entered the qualifying draw of the same tournament, and defeated future ATP top 50 player Denis Istomin 6–0, 6–1 to win his first ITF junior match. Sitak was taken out in the third and final round of qualifying by a future ATP top 100 player Teymuraz Gabashvili 6–4, 7–5.

At the age of 14, Sitak won the prestigious Orange Bowl.

Sitak made his first junior Grand Slam appearance at the age of 15 at the 2002 Australian Open where he was beaten in straight sets by Australian Christopher Roman. Sitak's last junior tournament came a year later at the 2003 Australian Open where he was eliminated by Korean Suk Hyun-joon in the first round.

== Professional career ==
=== 2002: Pro debut ===
Sitak began his senior career in 2002 at a challenger event in Togliatti, Russia, where he received a wildcard into the main draw but fell in the first round to Thomas Blake, older brother of former top 10 player James Blake.

=== 2005: First Futures title ===
Sitak's first title came in 2005 in a Russian Futures tournament, where he defeated Pavel Chekhov 4–6, 6–4, 6–4 in the final.

=== 2011 ===
Sitak began 2011 under the New Zealand flag and received a wildcard into the 2011 Heineken Open qualifying, where he was defeated by Frenchman Ludovic Walter 6–3, 6–4 in the first round.

=== 2012 ===
He won the men's singles in the Ojai Tennis Tournament in 2012.

=== 2014: First ATP doubles title ===
Sitak partnered Polish tennis player Mateusz Kowalczyk to win the 2014 MercedesCup doubles title, defeating Philipp Oswald and Guillermo García López 2–6, 6–1, 10–7 in the final.

=== 2017: New partnership with Koolhof ===
Sitak's long-running doubles partnership with Nicholas Monroe came to an end after Wimbledon in 2017, and he subsequently teamed up with Dutch player Wesley Koolhof. They reached the final in Atlanta, losing to the Bryan brothers, and lost in the first round at the US Open before winning a Challenger event in Szczecin, Poland, and losing another ATP final, this time in Metz, to Julien Benneteau and Édouard Roger-Vasselin.

=== 2018 ===
Starting the new year in Brisbane, Sitak and Koolhof lost in the semi-finals to Leonardo Mayer and Horacio Zeballos. They lost in the first round in Auckland to Michael Venus and Raven Klaasen, and then 7–6^{(5)}, 4–6, 4–6 in the second round of the Australian Open to the eventual winners, Oliver Marach and Mate Pavić. Although they were not in the original draw for the Mixed Doubles, Sitak and Olga Savchuk teamed up as alternates after an injury to Anastasia Rodionova in her women's doubles match meant that she and Marach could not participate. They were beaten in a first-round match tie-break by Nadiia Kichenok and Marcel Granollers.

Sitak and Koolhof then went to Newport Beach in California where, as top seeds, they lost in the first round, 2–6, 1–6, to Treat Huey and Denis Kudla. After that came the Davis Cup where, in Tianjin, Sitak and Marcus Daniell lost their doubles tie to the lowly-ranked Chinese pair of Gong Mao-Xin and Zhang Ze. Sitak and Koolhof then lost in the quarter-finals at Montpellier before going all the way to the final in the New York Open, being beaten by Max Mirnyi and Philipp Oswald in a match tie-break. They followed that up with a first round loss at Delray Beach to Scott Lipsky and Divij Sharan.

Their up and down season continued in Brazil, where they reached the final in São Paulo, but were beaten in straight sets by Federico Delbonis and Máximo González. Their next stop was Irving, Texas, where they lost in the semi-finals of the ATP Challenger to Alexander Peya and Philipp Petzschner. Moving to Europe, and playing in the Alicante Challenger in Spain as preparation for the European clay court season, they won their second title together when they beat Guido Andreozzi and Ariel Behar 6–3, 6–2, in the final, but they lost in the first round of their next tournament in Marrakech. In the Hungarian Open they beat the top seeds Nikola Mektić and Alexander Peya in the first round, but lost in the second to Marcin Matkowski and Sitak's former partner Nicholas Monroe.

Their next tournament was at Estoril where they went all the way to the final before losing to the British pair of Kyle Edmund and Cameron Norrie, 2–6, 4–6. They then lost in the first round of the Bordeaux Challenger tournament after Sitak had been hit in the right ear by a smash from Radu Albot, and also in the first round in Geneva, the last tournament before the French Open.

At Roland Garros, Sitak and Koolhof beat Andre Begemann and Antonio Šančić in the first round, then the ninth seeds Ivan Dodig and Rajeev Ram, before going down to fifth seeds Juan Sebastián Cabal and Robert Farah. All three matches went to a deciding set. After the tournament finished it was announced that the pair would split, with Koolhof joining Sitak's fellow New Zealander, and former partner, Marcus Daniell, and Sitak linking up with Indian Divij Sharan.

Sitak and Sharan's first tournament together was at 's-Hertogenbosch, where they were beaten in the semi-finals by Michael Venus and Raven Klaasen. They then lost in a big upset in the first round of qualifying at Halle, before finding top seeds Cabal and Farah their nemesis in the first round at Eastbourne.

They reached the quarter-finals at Wimbledon, the best-ever result in a Grand Slam tournament for either of them. They had to come from two sets down in both their second and third round matches, against Julio Peralta and Horacio Zeballos and Marcin Matkowski and Jonathan Erlich respectively, before lining up against Mike Bryan and Jack Sock in the quarter-finals. There were three tie-break sets to start, and just one loss of serve in the fourth set was enough to seal their defeat at the hands of the eventual champions. In mixed doubles, Sitak teamed up with Ukrainian Lyudmyla Kichenok to beat Argentina's Leonardo Mayer and María Irigoyen, but he withdrew from the second round due to fatigue from the length of the men's doubles matches.

Sitak teamed up with Erlich for the Hall of Fame Championships in Newport, marching imperiously to the final, where they very quickly swept aside clay-court specialists Marcelo Arévalo and Miguel Ángel Reyes-Varela. Sitak maintained that it was their experience which counted – it was the 39th ATP final for Erlich, and the 11th for Sitak, but just the first for both their opponents.

Moving on to Washington, D.C. for the Citi Open, Sitak and Sharan beat Jamie Cerretani and Leander Paes in the first round before losing to Jamie Murray and Bruno Soares in the quarter-finals. Sitak then entered the Toronto Masters with Stefanos Tsitsipas, and received a first-round call up as an alternate for a withdrawn pair. They ended up playing Michael Venus and Raven Klaasen, and lost 6–4, 6–4. Moving on to Cincinnati for the next Masters event, the pair qualified for direct acceptance. In the first round they were drawn against Ivan Dodig and Robin Haase, and lost in a match tie-break.

In his last tournament before the US Open, Sitak teamed up with Aisam-ul-Haq Qureshi at Winston-Salem. They beat Max Mirnyi and Philipp Oswald, then Marcelo Demoliner and Santiago González, before falling to Jamie Cerretani and Leander Paes in the semi-final. In the US Open, Sitak and Sharan lost to eventual runners-up Łukasz Kubot and Marcelo Melo in the second round, while Sitak and Lyudmyla Kichenok were beaten in a tight first round battle in the mixed doubles, losing 10–8 in the match tie-break to fourth seeds Latisha Chan and Ivan Dodig.

The US Open was followed by New Zealand's Davis Cup tie against Korea in Gimcheon, where Sitak and debutant Ajeet Rai were successful in their doubles rubber. However, New Zealand lost the tie 3–2, and were relegated to Group II of the Asia/Oceania zone for the first time in five years. Dashing back to France for what turned out to be just one match, Sitak, again with Qureshi, lost in the first round at Metz to Oliver Marach and Jürgen Melzer. Reunited with Sharan a week later in China, they were upset in the first round of the Chengdu Open by Austin Krajicek and Jeevan Nedunchezhiyan.

In the Japan Open they drew Jamie Murray and Bruno Soares in the first round, and lost in straight sets, and then were able to get into the Shanghai Masters as an alternate entry, where they lost in the second round to Kubot and Melo, who went on to win the title. Their next event was the European Open in Antwerp where, as fourth seeds, they lost to second seeds Nicolas Mahut and Édouard Roger-Vasselin in an entertaining semi-final.

From there they travelled to Basel for the Swiss Indoors Open, where they lost in an upset result in the semi-finals to Mischa and Alexander Zverev. They finished their season at the Paris Masters where, with only an hour's notice, they again took the court as an alternate. They beat Feliciano and Marc López in the first round, but lost in straight sets in the second round to the best team in the world for 2018, Mike Bryan and Jack Sock.

=== 2019 ===
With a new partner in the left-handed American Austin Krajicek, Sitak began 2019 in Brisbane, where they lost in the quarter-finals to Rajeev Ram and Joe Salisbury. They also lost in the quarter-finals in Auckland, this time to Bob and Mike Bryan, the former playing his first tournament since being injured in Monte Carlo and subsequently having surgery to replace his hip.

The Australian Open also saw them record a win and a loss, beating Leander Paes and Miguel Ángel Reyes-Varela in the first round, but losing a tight match to eventual semi-finalists Ryan Harrison and Sam Querrey in the second, 6–4, 7–6^{(5)}. Sitak had another new partner in the mixed doubles, teaming up with former World doubles number one Ekaterina Makarova. Seeded eighth, they lost in the first round to Andreja Klepač and Édouard Roger-Vasselin.

Sitak and Krajicek then lost in the first round at Montpellier before going to Rotterdam, where they got into the main draw as Lucky Losers, but again lost in the first round. The same fate awaited them in Rio de Janeiro, but they had far better luck in Acapulco, where they finished runners-up to Mischa and Alexander Zverev after easily taking the first set of the final. It was the first ATP500 series final for both Sitak and Krajicek.

Because of their relative rankings, Sitak found a new partner for Indian Wells in singles specialist Nikoloz Basilashvili, but they went out in the first round to eighth seeds Henri Kontinen and John Peers. That meant that he and Krajicek were able to go straight to Phoenix, where they had walk-overs in the first two rounds of the Phoenix Challenger, beat Jamie Cerretani and Nicholas Monroe in the semi-finals, and lost to Jamie Murray and Neal Skupski in the final.

From there they went to Miami, where they lost in the first round, and on to Houston for the US Clay Court Championships, where they lost to the Skupski brothers in the semi-finals. That was followed by a loss in qualifying in Barcelona and a quarter-final loss in Munich before a first round loss in Madrid, where they had got in as an alternate pair.

They also got into the Italian Open as an alternate pair, and this time made it to the second round, losing to eventual champions Juan Sebastián Cabal and Robert Farah. Another first round loss, this time as second seeds in Geneva, preceded their attempt at the French Open, where Krajicek dropped a bombshell just a couple of days before their first round match by announcing that he would be ending their partnership after this tournament. Seeded 16th, the pair didn't have a single practice together before losing in the first round to Hsieh Cheng-peng and Christopher Rungkat. He and Makoto Ninomiya played mixed doubles together, but lost in a first round match tie-break to eventual semi-finalists Nadiia Kichenok and Aisam-ul-Haq Qureshi.

Sitak had different partners for each of his first three grass tournaments before winning the Antalya Open with Jonathan Erlich in a week where the on-court temperatures seldom dropped below 40 degrees Celsius. They defeated Ivan Dodig and Filip Polášek in straight sets in the final, having beaten French Open champions Kevin Krawietz and Andreas Mies in the first round. At Wimbledon Sitak and Erlich lost in the first round to Máximo González and Horacio Zeballos, but Sitak went much further in the mixed doubles.

Although he and Laura Siegemund made it to the quarter-finals before losing to fifth seeds Květa Peschke and Wesley Koolhof, it's their first round match against Darija Jurak and Ken Skupski. The match was eventually moved to another court to be finished. Their top quality third round match against third seeds Gabriela Dabrowski and Mate Pavić took three hours and 17 minutes, becoming the first mixed doubles match to require Wimbledon's innovation of a tie-break at 12–12 in the final set.

Sitak and Erlich were unable to defend their title in Newport, losing in the first round, before Sitak teamed up with Radu Albot to reach the semi-finals in Atlanta, but they lost in the first round in Los Cabos. Next up was the US Open, where Sitak and Denys Molchanov lost in the first round to second seeds Łukasz Kubot and Marcelo Melo. The same fate befell him in the mixed doubles, where he and Lucie Hradecká also lost in the first round.

Two more first round losses followed before Sitak reunited with Divij Sharan. Although losing their first match together, they reached the quarter-finals of the Japan Open. They made the Paris Masters as alternates, beating Pavić and Bruno Soares in the first round before losing to Jérémy Chardy and Fabrice Martin in the second. Two first round losses in Challenger events ended the 2019 season for Sitak.

=== 2020 ===
Sitak had a six-week break before he and Sharan started the new year with a first round loss in Doha. They were more successful in Auckland, upsetting top seeds John Peers and Michael Venus in the first round before losing a tight match in the second against Sander Gillé and Joran Vliegen. They lost in the second round of the Australian Open to Mate Pavić and Bruno Soares and in the first round in Pune when seeded second. Then followed three tournaments with a win and a loss – New York, Delray Beach (where they lost to eventual champions Bob and Mike Bryan) and the Chilean capital, Santiago.

The following week saw the pair split up to play for their respective countries in the Davis Cup, with Sitak joining Marcus Daniell for the first time in two years as New Zealand played Venezuela for the first time ever, in Auckland. It was a successful return, as the pair won their rubber in straight sets to help New Zealand to a 3–1 win and a place in the next round, against South Korea. Just a day later came the news that the partnership with Sharan was over, the Indian deciding that their results weren't good enough to justify continuing as a pair. That was followed by the suspension of all international tennis due to the COVID-19 coronavirus.

Sitak returned to action in August with a new partner, Slovak Igor Zelenay. They lost in the first round in two Challenger events in Prague, but took their first title at the third attempt, in Ostrava. They were the only alternate team to get into the French Open, but lost in the first round, as they did in a Challenger in Parma. They fared better at a new ATP250 tournament in Santa Margherita di Pula, Sardinia, losing in the quarter-finals to eventual winners Marcus Daniell and Philipp Oswald, but this was their last tournament together.

With partners for just one tournament at a time, Sitak lost in the quarter-finals in Istanbul and Nur-Sultan, and in the first round of the Paris Masters. He got to the quarter-finals of the Sofia Open in Bulgaria before flying to South America for a final Challenger event, reaching the semi-finals in Lima.

=== 2021 ===
The early part of 2021 saw Sitak continue to criss-cross the globe. Starting in Australia, Sitak and Federico Delbonis lost in the second round of the Great Ocean Road Open to fellow New Zealanders Marcus Daniell and Michael Venus, before Sitak and Jonny O'Mara were eliminated in the first round of the Australian Open by eventual runners-up Rajeev Ram and Joe Salisbury.

Sitak then paired up with Nicholas Monroe for the first time in several years, losing in the first round in three tournaments in South America before he moved north to Acapulco. Although he and Dominik Koepfer lost in the final qualifying round, they took their place in the main draw as Lucky Losers, but were beaten in a match tie-break by Marcelo Demoliner and Santiago González.

Sitak then headed to Europe, where he and Sergio Martos Gornés lost in the semi-finals of a Challenger event in Lugano, having won a marathon match-tie break (17–15) in their previous match. That was followed by first round losses in both a Challenger and an ATP tournament in Marbella.

At the 2021 Astana Open he reached the semifinal in doubles partnering Ričardas Berankis, where they lost to top seeds and eventual champions Santiago González and Andrés Molteni.

=== 2024: Retirement ===
In January 2024, Sitak announced that he would retire from professional tennis. He played his final professional match at the 2024 ASB Classic.

== ATP career finals ==
=== Doubles: 13 (5 titles, 8 runners-up) ===
Legend Grand Slam tournaments (0–0) ATP World Tour Finals (0–0) ATP World Tour Masters 1000 (0–0) ATP World Tour 500 Series (0–1) ATP World Tour 250 Series (5–7)	Finals by surface Hard (1–5) Clay (1–3) Grass (3–0)	Finals by setting Outdoor (4–4) Indoor (1–4)

Result	W–L	Date	Tournament	Tier	Surface	Partner	Opponents	Score
Win	1–0	Jul 2014	Stuttgart Open, Germany	250 Series	Clay	(Poland) Mateusz Kowalczyk	(Spain) Guillermo García López (Austria) Philipp Oswald	2–6, 6–1, [10–7]
Win	2–0	Feb 2015	Open Sud de France, France	250 Series	Hard (i)	(New Zealand) Marcus Daniell	(United Kingdom) Dominic Inglot (Romania) Florin Mergea	3–6, 6–4, [16–14]
Loss	2–1	Feb 2015	Memphis Open, United States	250 Series	Hard (i)	(United States) Donald Young	(Poland) Mariusz Fyrstenberg (Mexico) Santiago González	7–5, 6–7^{(1–7)}, [8–10]
Loss	2–2	Apr 2015	Romanian Open, Romania	250 Series	Clay	(United States) Nicholas Monroe	(Romania) Marius Copil (Romania) Adrian Ungur	6–3, 5–7, [15–17]
Win	3–2	Jun 2016	Stuttgart Open, Germany (2)	250 Series	Grass	(New Zealand) Marcus Daniell	(Austria) Oliver Marach (France) Fabrice Martin	6–7^{(4–7)}, 6–4, [10–8]
Loss	3–3	Jul 2017	Atlanta Open, United States	250 Series	Hard	(Netherlands) Wesley Koolhof	(United States) Bob Bryan (United States) Mike Bryan	3–6, 4–6
Loss	3–4	Sep 2017	Moselle Open, France	250 Series	Hard (i)	(Netherlands) Wesley Koolhof	(France) Julien Benneteau (France) Édouard Roger-Vasselin	5–7, 3–6
Loss	3–5	Feb 2018	New York Open, United States	250 Series	Hard (i)	(Netherlands) Wesley Koolhof	(Belarus) Max Mirnyi (Austria) Philipp Oswald	4–6, 6–4, [6–10]
Loss	3–6	Mar 2018	Brasil Open, Brazil	250 Series	Clay (i)	(Netherlands) Wesley Koolhof	(Argentina) Federico Delbonis (Argentina) Máximo González	4–6, 2–6
Loss	3–7	May 2018	Estoril Open, Portugal	250 Series	Clay	(Netherlands) Wesley Koolhof	(United Kingdom) Kyle Edmund (United Kingdom) Cameron Norrie	4–6, 2–6
Win	4–7	Jul 2018	Hall of Fame Open, United States	250 Series	Grass	(Israel) Jonathan Erlich	(El Salvador) Marcelo Arévalo (Mexico) Miguel Ángel Reyes-Varela	6–1, 6–2
Loss	4–8	Mar 2019	Mexican Open, Mexico	500 Series	Hard	(United States) Austin Krajicek	(Germany) Alexander Zverev (Germany) Mischa Zverev	6–2, 6–7^{(4–7)}, [5–10]
Win	5–8	Jun 2019	Antalya Open, Turkey	250 Series	Grass	(Israel) Jonathan Erlich	(Croatia) Ivan Dodig (Slovakia) Filip Polášek	6–3, 6–4

== ATP Challenger and ITF Futures finals ==
=== Singles: 17 (5 titles, 12 runners-up) ===
Legend ATP Challenger (0–0) ITF Futures (5–12)	Finals by surface Hard (4–8) Clay (1–4) Grass (0–0)

Result	W–L	Date	Tournament	Tier	Surface	Opponent	Score
Loss	0–1	Dec 2004	Qatar F5, Doha	Futures	Hard	(Netherlands) Melvyn op der Heijde	4–6, 3–6
Loss	0–2	Jun 2005	Spain F13, Lanzarote	Futures	Hard	(Chinese Taipei) Jimmy Wang	3–6, 3–6
Win	1–2	Aug 2005	Russia F3, Korolyov	Futures	Clay	(Russia) Pavel Chekhov	4–6, 6–4, 6–4
Loss	1–3	Aug 2007	Russia F4, Moscow	Futures	Clay	(Belarus) Vladimir Voltchkov	6–7^{(4–7)}, 1–6
Loss	1–4	Feb 2008	Portugal F3, Albufeira	Futures	Hard	(Romania) Victor Ioniță	3–6, 4–6
Win	2–4	Mar 2008	USA F6, McAllen	Futures	Hard	(United States) Tim Smyczek	6–4, 6–2
Win	3–4	Apr 2008	USA F8, Little Rock	Futures	Hard	(United States) Matthew Roberts	6–4, 6–3
Loss	3–5	Oct 2008	USA F26, Hammond	Futures	Hard	(United States) Jean-Yves Aubone	4–6, 0–6
Loss	3–6	Jun 2009	USA F12, Loomis	Futures	Hard	(United States) Jesse Witten	6–4, 6–7^{(5–7)}, 2–6
Loss	3–7	Sep 2009	Russia F7, Sergiyev Posad	Futures	Clay	(Russia) Evgeny Kirillov	0–6, 3–6
Loss	3–8	Nov 2009	USA F29, Amelia Island	Futures	Clay	(United States) Jack Sock	6–7^{(5–7)}, 6–1, 3–6
Win	4–8	Mar 2010	USA F7, McAllen	Futures	Hard	(Croatia) Mario Ančić	6–1, 6–4
Loss	4–9	Jun 2010	USA F14, Davis	Futures	Hard	(South Africa) Fritz Wolmarans	3–6, 4–6
Loss	4–10	Aug 2010	Russia F4, Moscow	Futures	Clay	(Russia) Mikhail Vasiliev	6–7^{(3–7)}, 4–6
Loss	4–11	Jun 2011	Mexico F7, Morelia	Futures	Hard	(Uruguay) Marcel Felder	6–2, 4–6, 4–6
Loss	4–12	Sep 2011	USA F24, Costa Mesa	Futures	Hard	(United States) Steve Johnson	3–6, 3–6
Win	5–12	Dec 2012	Cambodia F2, Phnom Penh	Futures	Hard	(United Kingdom) Alexander Ward	6–4, 6–7^{(3–7)}, 7–6^{(7–4)}

=== Doubles: 63 (30 titles, 33 runners-up) ===
Legend ATP Challenger (15–19) ITF Futures (15–14)	Finals by surface Hard (20–20) Clay (10–12) Grass (0–0) Carpet (0–1)

Result	W–L	Date	Tournament	Tier	Surface	Partner	Opponents	Score
Win	1–0	Aug 2003	Russia F1, Sergiyev Posad	Futures	Clay	(Russia) Dmitri Sitak	(Russia) Alexei Ageev (Russia) Alexander Markin	6–3, 6–2
Loss	1–1	Aug 2003	Russia F3, Zhukovsky	Futures	Clay	(Russia) Dmitri Sitak	(Belarus) Vitali Chvets (Russia) Alexey Sergeev	6–7^{(4–7)}, 1–5 ret.
Win	2–1	Dec 2004	Qatar F3, Doha	Futures	Hard	(Russia) Dmitri Sitak	(India) Jaco Mathew (India) Ravishankar Pathanjali	6–3, 6–3
Win	3–1	Dec 2004	Qatar F4, Doha	Futures	Hard	(Russia) Dmitri Sitak	(Bulgaria) Yordan Kanev (Bulgaria) Ilia Kushev	7–6^{(7–5)}, 6–0
Win	4–1	Dec 2004	Qatar F5, Doha	Futures	Hard	(Russia) Dmitri Sitak	(Bulgaria) Yordan Kanev (Bulgaria) Ilia Kushev	Walkover
Loss	4–2	Feb 2005	Spain F2, Murcia	Futures	Clay	(France) Gérald Brémond	(Spain) Antonio Baldellou-Esteva (Spain) Germán Puentes	3–6, 5–7
Loss	4–3	Apr 2005	Uzbekistan F2, Guliston	Futures	Hard	(Russia) Dmitri Sitak	(Kazakhstan) Alexey Kedryuk (India) Sunil-Kumar Sipaeya	3–6, 6–1, 3–6
Win	5–3	Jun 2005	Spain F12, La Palma	Futures	Hard	(Russia) Dmitri Sitak	(Spain) Javier Genaro-Martinez (Venezuela) Daniel Vallverdu	7–6^{(8–6)}, 7–6^{(7–4)}
Win	6–3	Aug 2005	Russia F3, Korolyov	Futures	Clay	(Russia) Dmitri Sitak	(Russia) Victor Kozin (Russia) Alexei Miller	6–4, 7–6^{(7–4)}
Win	7–3	Jan 2006	Germany F2, Stuttgart	Futures	Hard (i)	(Switzerland) Stéphane Bohli	(Germany) Philipp Marx (Germany) Torsten Popp	6–3, 7–5
Win	8–3	Mar 2006	France F5, Lille	Futures	Hard (i)	(Switzerland) Stéphane Bohli	(Portugal) Fred Gil (Poland) Filip Urban	6–1, 6–2
Loss	8–4	Jul 2006	Penza, Russia	Challenger	Hard	(Russia) Denis Matsukevich	(Uzbekistan) Murad Inoyatov (Uzbekistan) Denis Istomin	1–6, 3–6
Loss	8–5	Dec 2006	Tunisia F7, Mégrine	Futures	Hard	(France) Ludwig Pellerin	(United States) Patrick Briaud (United States) Adam Davidson	3–6, 7–6^{(7–5)}, 4–6
Win	9–5	Feb 2007	Italy F2, Trento	Futures	Hard (i)	(Russia) Dmitri Sitak	(Australia) Raphael Durek (Australia) Joseph Sirianni	7–6^{(7–4)}, 6–3
Loss	9–6	Apr 2007	Russia F2, Tyumen	Futures	Hard (i)	(Russia) Dmitri Sitak	(Russia) Evgeny Kirillov (Russia) Konstantin Kravchuk	6–7^{(5–7)}, 4–6
Loss	9–7	May 2007	Belarus F1, Minsk	Futures	Hard	(Croatia) Ivan Cerović	(Belarus) Sergey Betov (Belarus) Vladimir Voltchkov	4–6, 7–5, 3–6
Loss	9–8	Aug 2007	Russia F4, Moscow	Futures	Clay	(Russia) Dmitri Sitak	(Russia) Alexandre Krasnoroutskiy (Ukraine) Denys Molchanov	4–6, 2–6
Win	10–8	Sep 2008	Lubbock, US	Challenger	Hard	(Moldova) Roman Borvanov	(United States) Alex Bogomolov (Serbia) Dušan Vemić	6–2, 6–3
Loss	10–9	Aug 2009	Russia F3, Moscow	Futures	Clay	(Serbia) David Savić	(Russia) Ilya Belyaev (Russia) Evgeny Donskoy	6–1, 6–7^{(5–7)}, [10–12]
Win	11–9	Nov 2009	USA F27, Birmingham	Futures	Clay	(Armenia) Tigran Martirosyan	(United States) Colt Gaston (United States) Michael Venus	6–3, 6–4
Win	12–9	Nov 2009	USA F28, Niceville	Futures	Clay	(Armenia) Tigran Martirosyan	(United States) Sekou Bangoura (United States) Denis Kudla	6–4, 7–5
Win	13–9	Feb 2010	USA F6, Harlingen	Futures	Hard	(Romania) Cătălin-Ionuț Gârd	(Slovakia) Matej Bocko (Serbia) Vladimir Obradović	6–4, 7–6^{(7–3)}
Loss	13–10	May 2010	Carson, US	Challenger	Hard	(Portugal) Leonardo Tavares	(United States) Brian Battistone (United States) Nicholas Monroe	7–5, 3–6, [4–10]
Win	14–10	Jun 2010	Ojai, US	Challenger	Hard	(Portugal) Leonardo Tavares	(India) Harsh Mankad (South Africa) Izak van der Merwe	4–6, 6–4, [10–8]
Win	15–10	Aug 2010	Beijing, China	Challenger	Hard	(Canada) Pierre-Ludovic Duclos	(Australia) Sadik Kadir (India) Purav Raja	7–6^{(7–4)}, 7–6^{(7–5)}
Loss	15–11	Aug 2010	Russia F4, Moscow	Futures	Clay	(Russia) Anton Manegin	(Russia) Ilya Belyaev (Serbia) David Savić	3–6, 3–6
Win	16–11	Apr 2011	USA F9, Little Rock	Futures	Hard	(Australia) Nima Roshan	(United States) Taylor Fogleman (United States) Benjamin Rogers	6–3, 7–5
Win	17–11	Jun 2011	Mexico F7, Morelia	Futures	Hard	(New Zealand) Marcus Daniell	(Philippines) Ruben Gonzales (United States) Chris Kwon	6–0, 6–3
Loss	17–12	Aug 2011	Colombia F4, Medellín	Futures	Clay	(United States) Peter Aarts	(Brazil) Raony Carvalho (Brazil) Fabiano de Paula	3–6, 3–6
Loss	17–13	Mar 2012	USA F7, Calabasas	Futures	Hard	(Australia) Nima Roshan	(Australia) Carsten Ball (Germany) Andre Begemann	6–7^{(7–9)}, 4–6
Loss	17–14	Apr 2012	Tallahassee, US	Challenger	Hard	(United States) Blake Strode	(Germany) Martin Emmrich (Sweden) Andreas Siljeström	2–6, 6–7^{(4–7)}
Loss	17–15	Oct 2012	Turkey F38, Antalya	Futures	Hard	(Italy) Edoardo Eremin	(Moldova) Maxim Dubarenco (Australia) Brydan Klein	4–6, 6–3, [9–11]
Loss	17–16	Nov 2012	USA F31, Niceville	Futures	Clay	(Belarus) Andrei Vasilevski	(United States) Jason Jung (United States) Ryan Thacher	5–7, 2–6
Loss	17–17	Jan 2013	Nouméa, New Caledonia	Challenger	Hard	(New Zealand) Rubin Statham	(Australia) Sam Groth (Japan) Toshihide Matsui	6–7^{(6–8)}, 6–1, [4–10]
Win	18–17	Mar 2013	Australia F4, Ipswich	Futures	Hard	(New Zealand) Rubin Statham	(Australia) Jacob Grills (Australia) Dane Propoggia	6–3, 6–1
Loss	18–18	Apr 2013	USA F9, Oklahoma City	Futures	Hard	(India) Saketh Myneni	(United States) Jean-Yves Aubone (United States) Dennis Nevolo	1–6, 5–7
Loss	18–19	Jul 2013	Oberstaufen, Germany	Challenger	Clay	(Netherlands) Stephan Fransen	(Germany) Dominik Meffert (Austria) Philipp Oswald	1–6, 6–3, [12–14]
Win	19–19	Oct 2013	São Paulo, Brazil	Challenger	Clay	(Moldova) Roman Borvanov	(Peru) Sergio Galdós (Argentina) Guido Pella	6–4, 7–6^{(7–3)}
Loss	19–20	Nov 2013	Toyota, Japan	Challenger	Carpet (i)	(New Zealand) Marcus Daniell	(United States) Chase Buchanan (Slovenia) Blaž Rola	6–4, 3–6, [4–10]
Loss	19–21	Apr 2014	León, Mexico	Challenger	Hard	(New Zealand) Marcus Daniell	(Australia) Sam Groth (Australia) Chris Guccione	3–6, 4–6
Win	20–21	May 2014	Rome, Italy	Challenger	Clay	(Moldova) Radu Albot	(Italy) Andrea Arnaboldi (Italy) Flavio Cipolla	4–6, 6–2, [11–9]
Loss	20–22	Jun 2014	Arad, Romania	Challenger	Clay	(Moldova) Radu Albot	(Croatia) Franko Škugor (Croatia) Antonio Veić	4–6, 6–7^{(3–7)}
Win	21–22	Jul 2014	Granby, Canada	Challenger	Hard	(New Zealand) Marcus Daniell	(Australia) Jordan Kerr (France) Fabrice Martin	7–6^{(7–5)}, 5–7, [10–5]
Loss	21–23	Aug 2014	Vancouver, Canada	Challenger	Hard	(New Zealand) Marcus Daniell	(United States) Austin Krajicek (Australia) John-Patrick Smith	3–6, 6–4, [8–10]
Loss	21–24	Nov 2014	Traralgon, Australia	Challenger	Hard	(New Zealand) Marcus Daniell	(United Kingdom) Brydan Klein (Australia) Dane Propoggia	6–7^{(6–8)}, 6–3, [6–10]
Loss	21–25	Nov 2014	Yokohama, Japan	Challenger	Hard	(New Zealand) Marcus Daniell	(United States) Bradley Klahn (Australia) Matt Reid	6–4, 4–6, [7–10]
Loss	21–26	May 2015	Aix-en-Provence, France	Challenger	Clay	(United States) Nicholas Monroe	(Netherlands) Robin Haase (Pakistan) Aisam-ul-Haq Qureshi	1–6, 2–6
Win	22–26	Aug 2015	Aptos, US	Challenger	Hard	(Australia) Chris Guccione	(India) Yuki Bhambri (Australia) Matthew Ebden	6–4, 7–6^{(7–2)}
Loss	22–27	Oct 2015	Tashkent, Uzbekistan	Challenger	Hard	(Germany) Andre Begemann	(Belarus) Sergey Betov (Russia) Mikhail Elgin	4–6, 4–6
Win	23–27	Mar 2016	Puebla, Mexico	Challenger	Hard	(New Zealand) Marcus Daniell	(Mexico) Santiago González (Croatia) Mate Pavić	3–6, 6–2, [12–10]
Win	24–27	Mar 2016	San Luis Potosí, Mexico	Challenger	Clay	(New Zealand) Marcus Daniell	(Mexico) Santiago González (Croatia) Mate Pavić	6–3, 7–6^{(7–4)}
Win	25–27	Mar 2017	Guadalajara, Mexico	Challenger	Hard	(Mexico) Santiago González	(Australia) Luke Saville (Australia) John-Patrick Smith	6–3, 1–6, [10–5]
Loss	25–28	May 2017	Bordeaux, France	Challenger	Clay	(Mexico) Santiago González	(India) Purav Raja (India) Divij Sharan	4–6, 4–6
Win	26–28	Sep 2017	Szczecin, Poland	Challenger	Clay	(Netherlands) Wesley Koolhof	(Belarus) Aliaksandr Bury (Sweden) Andreas Siljeström	6–1, 7–5
Win	27–28	Apr 2018	Alicante, Spain	Challenger	Clay	(Netherlands) Wesley Koolhof	(Argentina) Guido Andreozzi (Uruguay) Ariel Behar	6–3, 6–2
Loss	27–29	Mar 2019	Phoenix, US	Challenger	Clay	(United States) Austin Krajicek	(United Kingdom) Jamie Murray (United Kingdom) Neal Skupski	7–6^{(7–2)}, 5–7, [6–10]
Win	28–29	Aug 2020	Ostrava, Czech Republic	Challenger	Clay	(Slovakia) Igor Zelenay	(Poland) Karol Drzewiecki (Poland) Szymon Walków	7–5, 6–4
Win	29–29	Sep 2021	Saint-Tropez, France	Challenger	Hard	(Croatia) Antonio Šančić	(France) Manuel Guinard (Monaco) Romain Arneodo	7–6^{(7–5)}, 6–4
Loss	29–30	Sep 2021	Istanbul, Turkey	Challenger	Hard	(Croatia) Antonio Šančić	(Moldova) Radu Albot (Moldova) Alexander Cozbinov	6–4, 5–7, [9–11]
Loss	29–31	Apr 2022	Mexico City, Mexico	Challenger	Clay	(France) Jonathan Eysseric	(Chile) Nicolás Jarry (Brazil) Matheus Pucinelli de Almeida	2–6, 3–6
Loss	29–32	Aug 2022	Granby, Canada	Challenger	Hard	(France) Jonathan Eysseric	(United Kingdom) Julian Cash (United Kingdom) Henry Patten	3–6, 2–6
Loss	29–33	Oct 2022	Charlottesville, USA	Challenger	Hard (i)	(United States) Alex Lawson	(United Kingdom) Julian Cash (United Kingdom) Henry Patten	2–6, 4–6
Win	30–33	June 2023	Little Rock, USA	Challenger	Hard	(South Korea) Nam Ji-sung	(Canada) Alexis Galarneau (United States) Nicolas Moreno de Alboran	6–4, 6–4

== Davis Cup (21) ==
Group membership World Group (0) Group I (12–5) Group II (2–2) Group III (0) Group IV (0)	Results by surface Hard (14–3) Grass (0–1) Clay (1–2) Carpet (0–0)	Results by setting Outdoors (6–3) Indoors (9–3)

Note: walkover victory when Pakistan abandoned the tie in 2013 is not counted as a match played

- ▲ ▼ indicates the outcome of the Davis Cup match followed by the score, date, place of event, the zonal classification and its phase, and the court surface.

Rubber outcome	No.	Rubber	Match type (partner if any)	Opponent nation	Opponent player(s)	Score
▼2–3; 4–6 March 2011; Sport Complex Pahlavon, Namangan, Uzbekistan; Group I Asia/Oceania First round; Clay (i) surface
Defeat	1.	I	Singles	Uzbekistan	Farrukh Dustov	0–6, 3–6, 1–6
Victory	1.	IV	Singles (dead rubber)	Uzbekistan	Murad Inoyatov	6–1, 6–7^{(5–7)}, 6–3
▲5–0; 8–10 July 2011; TSB Hub, Hāwera, New Zealand; Group I Asia/Oceania First round play-off; Hard (i) surface
Victory	2.	III	Doubles (with Marcus Daniell)	Philippines	Ruben Gonzales / Cecil Mamiit	7–6^{(7–0)}, 6–3, 6–2
Victory	3.	V	Singles (dead rubber)	Philippines	Cecil Mamiit	6–4, 7–5
▼2–3; 10–12 February 2012; TECT Arena, Tauranga, New Zealand; Group I Asia/Oceania First round; Hard (i) surface
Victory	4.	IV	Singles (dead rubber)	Uzbekistan	Murad Inoyatov	6–2, 3–6, 6–3
▼0–5; 14–16 September 2012; CLTA Tennis Stadium, Chandigarh, India; Group I Asia/Oceania First round play-off; Hard surface
Defeat	2.	V	Singles (dead rubber)	India	Sanam Singh	4–6, 1–6
▼2–3; 19–21 October 2012; Kaohsiung Yangming Tennis Courts, Kaohsiung, Taiwan; Group I Asia/Oceania Relegation playoff, 2nd round play-off; Hard surface
Victory	5.	V	Singles (dead rubber)	Chinese Taipei	Yang Tsung-hua	6–1, 7–6^{(7–3)}
▲5–0; 1–3 February 2013; Albany Tennis Park, Auckland, New Zealand; Group II Asia/Oceania First round; Hard (i) surface
Victory	6.	II	Singles	Lebanon	Karim Alayli	6–2, 6–1, 6–0
Victory	7.	V	Singles (dead rubber)	Lebanon	Michael Massih	6–0, 6–0
▲4–1; 5–7 April 2013; Pun Hiang Golf & Country Club, Yangon, Myanmar; Group II Asia/Oceania Second round; Grass surface
Defeat	3.	I	Singles	Pakistan	Aqeel Khan	5–7, 6–3, 2–6, 5–7
Victory	(not counted as match played)	V	Singles (dead rubber)	Pakistan	Aisam-ul-Haq Qureshi	Walkover
▲3–2; 13–15 September 2013; Plantation Bay Resort & Spa, Lapu-Lapu, Philippines; Group II Asia/Oceania Third round; Clay surface
Defeat	4.	III	Doubles (with Marcus Daniell)	Philippines	Francis Casey Alcantara / Treat Huey	4–6, 3–6, 4–6
▲4–1; 24–26 October 2014; Z Energy Wilding Park Tennis Centre, Christchurch, New Zealand; Group I Asia/Oceania Relegation play-off 2nd round play-off; Hard (i) surface
Victory	8.	III	Doubles (with Marcus Daniell)	Chinese Taipei	Peng Hsien-yin / Wang Chieh-fu	6–0, 6–4, 6–2
Defeat	5.	IV	Singles	Chinese Taipei	Yang Tsung-hua	3–6, 7–5, 2–6
▲4–1; 6–8 March 2015; ASB Tennis Centre, Auckland, New Zealand; Group I Asia/Oceania First round; Hard surface
Victory	9.	III	Doubles (with Marcus Daniell)	China	Li Zhe / Zhang Ze	6–7^{(3–7)}, 6–7^{(4–7)}, 7–6^{(7–1)}, 6–3, 6–2
▼2–3; 17–19 July 2015; Wilding Park Tennis Centre, Christchurch, New Zealand; Group I Asia/Oceania Second round; Hard (i) surface
Victory	10.	III	Doubles (with Marcus Daniell)	India	Rohan Bopanna / Saketh Myneni	6–3, 7–6^{(7–1)}, 6–3
▼1–3; 4–6 March 2016; Seoul Olympic Park Tennis Center, Seoul, South Korea; Group I Asia/Oceania Second round; Hard surface
Victory	11.	III	Doubles (with Michael Venus)	South Korea	Lee Duck-hee / Lim Yong-kyu	7–6^{(7–3)}, 6–4, 4–6, 6–4
▼1–4; 3–5 February 2017; Balewadi Sports Complex, Pune, India; Group I Asia/Oceania First round; Hard surface
Victory	12.	III	Doubles (with Michael Venus)	India	Leander Paes / Vishnu Vardhan	3–6, 6–3, 7–6^{(8–6)}, 6–3
▲3–2; 7–9 April 2017; ASB Tennis Centre, Auckland, New Zealand; Group I Asia/Oceania Relegation play-off 1st round play-off; Hard surface
Victory	13.	III	Doubles (with Marcus Daniell)	South Korea	Chung Hong / Lee Jea-moon	6–2, 4–6, 6–4, 7–6^{(7–4)}
▼1–3; 1–3 February 2018; Tianjin Tennis Center, Tianjin, China; Group I Asia/Oceania First round; Hard (i) surface
Defeat	6.	III	Doubles (with Marcus Daniell)	China	Gong Maoxin / Zhang Ze	4–6, 4–6
▼2–3; 14–15 September 2018; Gimcheon Sports Town Tennis Courts, Gimcheon, South Korea; Group I Asia/Oceania Relegation playoff, 2nd round playoff; Hard (i) surface
Victory	14.	III	Doubles (with Ajeet Rai)	South Korea	Hong Seong-chan / Lee Jea-moon	7–5, 6–3
▲3–1; 6–7 March 2020; ASB Tennis Centre, Auckland, New Zealand; World Group I Play-off, Play-off round; Hard surface
Victory	15.	III	Doubles (with Marcus Daniell)	Venezuela	Luis David Martínez / Jordi Muñoz Abreu	6–3, 7–6^{(7–3)}

== Performance timelines ==
Key
W	F	SF	QF	#R	RR	Q#	P#	DNQ	A	Z#	PO	G	S	B	NMS	NTI	P	NH

(W) winner; (F) finalist; (SF) semifinalist; (QF) quarterfinalist; (#R) rounds 4, 3, 2, 1; (RR) round-robin stage; (Q#) qualification round; (P#) preliminary round; (DNQ) did not qualify; (A) absent; (Z#) Davis/Fed Cup Zonal Group (with number indication) or (PO) play-off; (G) gold, (S) silver or (B) bronze Olympic/Paralympic medal; (NMS) not a Masters tournament; (NTI) not a Tier I tournament; (P) postponed; (NH) not held; (SR) strike rate (events won / competed); (W–L) win–loss record.
To avoid confusion and double counting, these charts are updated at the conclusion of a tournament or when the player's participation has ended.

=== Doubles ===
	Russia						New Zealand													
Tournament	2005	2006	2007	2008	2009	2010	2011	2012	2013	2014	2015	2016	2017	2018	2019	2020	2021	2022	SR	W–L
Grand Slam tournaments
Australian Open	A	A	A	A	A	A	A	A	A	A	3R	1R	2R	2R	2R	2R	1R	1R	0 / 8	6–8
French Open	A	A	A	A	A	A	A	A	A	A	2R	2R	1R	3R	1R	1R	A	A	0 / 6	4–6
Wimbledon	A	A	A	A	A	A	A	A	A	Q1	2R	1R	3R	QF	1R	NH	1R	A	0 / 6	6–6
US Open	A	A	A	A	A	A	A	A	A	2R	1R	2R	1R	2R	1R	A	A	A	0 / 6	3–6
Win–loss	0–0	0–0	0–0	0–0	0–0	0–0	0–0	0–0	0–0	1–1	4–4	2–4	3–4	7–4	1–4	1–2	0–2	0–1	0 / 26	19–26
ATP World Tour Masters 1000
Indian Wells Masters	A	A	A	A	A	A	A	A	A	A	A	A	A	A	1R	NH	A	A	0 / 1	0–1
Miami Open	A	A	A	A	A	A	A	A	A	A	A	A	A	A	1R	NH	A	A	0 / 1	0–1
Monte-Carlo Masters	A	A	A	A	A	A	A	A	A	A	A	A	A	A	A	NH	A	A	0 / 0	0–0
Madrid Open	A	A	A	A	A	A	A	A	A	A	A	A	A	A	1R	NH	A	A	0 / 1	0–1
Italian Open	A	A	A	A	A	A	A	A	A	A	A	A	A	A	2R	A	A	A	0 / 1	1–1
Canadian Open	A	A	A	A	A	A	A	A	A	A	A	A	A	1R	A	NH	A	A	0 / 1	0–1
Cincinnati Masters	A	A	A	A	A	A	A	A	A	A	A	A	A	1R	A	A	A	A	0 / 1	0–1
Shanghai Masters	Not Held				A	A	A	A	A	A	A	A	A	2R	A	NH		A	0 / 1	1–1
Paris Masters	A	A	A	A	A	A	A	A	A	A	A	A	A	2R	2R	1R	A	A	0 / 3	2–3
Win–loss	0–0	0–0	0–0	0–0	0–0	0–0	0–0	0–0	0–0	0–0	0–0	0–0	0–0	2–4	2–5	0–1	0–0	0–0	0 / 10	4–10
National representation
Davis Cup	A	A	A	A	A	A	Z1	Z1	Z2	Z1	Z1	Z1	Z1	Z1	A	PO	A		0 / 0	10–2
Career statistics
Tournaments	1	0	0	0	0	0	1	1	1	4	24	24	23	30	30	12	17	4	172	
Titles	0	0	0	0	0	0	0	0	0	1	1	1	0	1	1	0	0	0	5	
Finals	0	0	0	0	0	0	0	0	0	1	3	1	2	4	2	0	0	0	14	
Overall win–loss	0–1	0–0	0–0	0–0	0–0	0–0	1–1	0–1	0–2	6–3	27–23	21–23	26–23	36–29	19–27	8–12	5–17	3–4	152–166	
Year-end ranking	423	419	467	518	354	182	357	351	144	68	43	62	55	34	62	78	110		47.8%	

=== Mixed doubles ===
Although the US and French Opens took place in 2020, mixed doubles were not included in either event due to the COVID-19 coronavirus.

Tournament	2015	2016	2017	2018	2019	2020	2021	2022	SR	W–L
Grand Slam tournaments
Australian Open	A	1R	A	1R	1R	A	A		0 / 3	0–3
French Open	A	A	2R	A	1R	NH	A		0 / 2	1–2
Wimbledon	3R	2R	2R	2R	QF	NH	A		0 / 5	8–5
US Open	A	A	2R	1R	1R	NH	A		0 / 3	1–3
Win–loss	2–1	1–2	3–3	1–3	3–4	0–0	0–0	0–0	0 / 13	10–13
