= 2019 Arizona Tennis Classic – Singles =

Singles
- 2019 Arizona Tennis Classic

Final
- Champion: (Italy) Matteo Berrettini
- Runner-up: (Kazakhstan) Mikhail Kukushkin
- Score: 3–6, 7–6^{(8–6)}, 7–6^{(7–2)}

Events
| Singles | Doubles |
- Arizona Tennis Classic

This was the first edition of the tournament.

Matteo Berrettini won the title after defeating Mikhail Kukushkin 3–6, 7–6^{(8–6)}, 7–6^{(7–2)} in the final.

== Seeds ==
All seeds receive a bye into the second round.

1. (Belgium) David Goffin (quarterfinals)
2. (France) Jérémy Chardy (second round)
3. (Australia) John Millman (quarterfinals)
4. (Kazakhstan) Mikhail Kukushkin (final)
5. (Australia) Matthew Ebden (second round)
6. (Italy) Matteo Berrettini (champion)
7. (Tunisia) Malek Jaziri (withdrew)
8. (Japan) Taro Daniel (third round)
9. (Latvia) Ernests Gulbis (second round)
10. (Germany) Peter Gojowczyk (third round)
11. (Chile) Nicolás Jarry (quarterfinals)
12. (Argentina) Guido Andreozzi (semifinals)
13. (United States) Bradley Klahn (withdrew)
14. (South Africa) Lloyd Harris (second round)
15. (Norway) Casper Ruud (third round)
16. (Belarus) Ilya Ivashka (third round)

== Draw ==
Key

- Q = Qualifier
- WC = Wild card
- LL = Lucky loser
- Alt = Alternate
- ITF = ITF entry
- PR = Protected ranking
- SR = Special ranking
- SE = Special exempt
- JE = Junior exempt
- JR = Junior Accelerator Programme entrant
- CO = College Accelerator Programme entrant
- NG = Next Gen Accelerator Program entrant
- w/o = Walkover
- r = Retired
- d = Defaulted

=== Finals ===
Quarterfinals
1/WC | (Belgium) David Goffin | 6 | 3 | 2
Alt | (Italy) Salvatore Caruso | 2 | 6 | 6
4 | (Kazakhstan) Mikhail Kukushkin | 6 | 7
11 | (Chile) Nicolás Jarry | 4 | 5
12 | (Argentina) Guido Andreozzi | 6 | 4 | 6
3/WC | (Australia) John Millman | 3 | 6 | 3
6 | (Italy) Matteo Berrettini | 6 | 6
(Italy) Lorenzo Sonego | 4 | 4

Semifinals
Alt | (Italy) Salvatore Caruso | 1 | 5
4 | (Kazakhstan) Mikhail Kukushkin | 6 | 7
12 | (Argentina) Guido Andreozzi | 6^{3} | 1
6 | (Italy) Matteo Berrettini | 7^{7} | 6

Final
4 | (Kazakhstan) Mikhail Kukushkin | 6 | 6^{6} | 6^{2}
6 | (Italy) Matteo Berrettini | 3 | 7^{8} | 7^{7}

=== Top half ===
==== Section 1 ====
First round
(Italy) L Vanni | 3 | 6^{6}
(Spain) R Carballés Baena | 6 | 7^{8}
(Sweden) E Ymer | 6 | 6
(Czech Republic) L Rosol | 3 | 4
(Russia) E Donskoy | 6 | 6
(Belgium) R Bemelmans | 3 | 3
Alt | (Italy) S Caruso | 6 | 6
(United States) M Krueger | 1 | 2

Second round
1/WC | (Belgium) D Goffin | 6 | 6
(Spain) R Carballés Baena | 1 | 4
(Sweden) E Ymer | 6 | 3 | 3
15 | (Norway) C Ruud | 1 | 6 | 6
9/WC | (Latvia) E Gulbis | 3 | 6^{6}
(Russia) E Donskoy | 6 | 7^{8}
Alt | (Italy) S Caruso | 4 | 7^{7} | 6
LL | (Czech Republic) D Kellovský | 6 | 6^{2} | 2

Third round
1/WC | (Belgium) D Goffin | 7^{7} | 7^{7}
15 | (Norway) C Ruud | 6^{4} | 6^{4}
(Russia) E Donskoy | 3 | 4
Alt | (Italy) S Caruso | 6 | 6

Quarterfinals
1/WC | (Belgium) D Goffin | 6 | 3 | 2
Alt | (Italy) S Caruso | 2 | 6 | 6

==== Section 2 ====
First round
(Chinese Taipei) J Jung | 6 | 3 | 2
WC | (Chinese Taipei) C-h Tseng | 3 | 6 | 6
(Australia) A Popyrin | 1 | 0^{r}
Alt | (Belarus) E Gerasimov | 6 | 3
Q | (Denmark) F Nielsen | 6^{7} | 3
(Canada) P Polansky | 7^{9} | 6
Alt | (United States) E Escobedo | 4 | 1
(United Kingdom) D Evans | 6 | 6

Second round
4 | (Kazakhstan) M Kukushkin | 7 | 6
WC | (Chinese Taipei) C-h Tseng | 5 | 3
Alt | (Belarus) E Gerasimov | 4 | 6 | 2
16 | (Belarus) I Ivashka | 6 | 4 | 6
11 | (Chile) N Jarry | 6 | 5 | 6
(Canada) P Polansky | 1 | 7 | 4
(United Kingdom) D Evans | 4 | 2
8 | (Japan) T Daniel | 6 | 6

Third round
4 | (Kazakhstan) M Kukushkin | 6 | 7^{7}
16 | (Belarus) I Ivashka | 2 | 6^{5}
11 | (Chile) N Jarry | 4 | 6 | 6
8 | (Japan) T Daniel | 6 | 1 | 4

Quarterfinals
4 | (Kazakhstan) M Kukushkin | 6 | 7
11 | (Chile) N Jarry | 4 | 5

=== Bottom half ===
==== Section 3 ====
First round
Q | (United States) Nathan Ponwith | 4 | 4
(Japan) T Ito | 6 | 6
Alt | (Italy) A Arnaboldi | 6 | 6
(Switzerland) H Laaksonen | 1 | 3
Alt | (Sweden) M Ymer | 6^{3} | 3
(Poland) K Majchrzak | 7^{7} | 6
Alt | (Japan) Y Uchiyama | 7 | 4 | 2
(Slovakia) L Lacko | 5 | 6 | 6

Second round
5 | (Australia) M Ebden | 6 | 4 | 6^{7}
(Japan) T Ito | 3 | 6 | 7^{9}
Alt | (Italy) A Arnaboldi | 7^{8} | 3 | 1
12 | (Argentina) G Andreozzi | 6^{6} | 6 | 6
LL | (France) F Martin | 5 | 5
(Poland) K Majchrzak | 7 | 7
(Slovakia) L Lacko | 7^{9} | 4 | 6^{4}
3/WC | (Australia) J Millman | 6^{7} | 6 | 7^{7}

Third round
(Japan) T Ito | 2 | 6 | 4
12 | (Argentina) G Andreozzi | 6 | 3 | 6
(Poland) K Majchrzak | 1 | 2
3/WC | (Australia) J Millman | 6 | 6

Quarterfinals
12 | (Argentina) G Andreozzi | 6 | 4 | 6
3/WC | (Australia) J Millman | 3 | 6 | 3

==== Section 4 ====
First round
(Uzbekistan) D Istomin | 3 | 1^{r}
(Slovakia) J Kovalík | 6 | 2
(India) R Ramanathan | 2 | 4
Alt | (Serbia) P Krstin | 6 | 6
(Italy) G Quinzi | 3 | 2^{r}
(United States) R Harrison | 6 | 2
(Italy) L Sonego | 6 | 6
Alt | (Spain) N Kuhn | 3 | 2

Second round
6 | (Italy) M Berrettini | 6 | 6
(Slovakia) J Kovalík | 1 | 1
Alt | (Serbia) P Krstin | 4 | 4
10 | (Germany) P Gojowczyk | 6 | 6
14 | (South Africa) L Harris | 6 | 4 | 4
(United States) R Harrison | 3 | 6 | 6
(Italy) L Sonego | 3 | 6 | 7
2/WC | (France) J Chardy | 6 | 3 | 5

Third round
6 | (Italy) M Berrettini | 6 | 7
10 | (Germany) P Gojowczyk | 3 | 5
(United States) R Harrison | 4 | 2
(Italy) L Sonego | 6 | 6

Quarterfinals
6 | (Italy) M Berrettini | 6 | 6
(Italy) L Sonego | 4 | 4
