= 2013 Davis Cup Asia/Oceania Zone Group II =

International tennis competition

The Asia/Oceania Zone is one of the three zones of regional Davis Cup competition in 2013.

In the Asia/Oceania Zone there are four different groups in which teams compete against each other to advance to the next group.

== Participating nations ==
Seeds:

1. New Zealand
2. Philippines
3. Thailand
4. Pakistan

Remaining Nations:

- Kuwait
- Lebanon
- Sri Lanka
- Syria

=== Draw ===
Play-offs
Jounieh, Lebanon (clay)
Lebanon | 2
Sri Lanka | 3
Mishref, Kuwait (hard)
Kuwait | 3
Syria | 2

First Round
Auckland, New Zealand (indoor hard)
1 | New Zealand | 5
Lebanon | 0
Colombo, Sri Lanka (clay)
4 | Pakistan | 3
Sri Lanka | 2
Meshref, Kuwait (hard)
Kuwait | 1
3 | Thailand | 4
Lapu-Lapu City, Philippines (clay)
Syria | 2
2 | Philippines | 3

Second Round
Yangon, Myanmar (grass)
1 | New Zealand | 4
4 | Pakistan | 1
Lapu-Lapu City, Philippines (clay)
3 | Thailand | 1
2 | Philippines | 4

Third Round
Lapu-Lapu City, Philippines
1 | New Zealand | 3
2 | Philippines | 2

- Lebanon and Syria relegated to Group III in 2014.
- New Zealand promoted to Group I in 2014.

== First round ==
=== New Zealand vs. Lebanon ===
New Zealand
5
Albany Tennis Park, Auckland, New Zealand
1–3 February 2013
hard (indoor)

Lebanon
0

| | | | 1 | 2 | 3 | 4 | 5 |
|---|---|---|---|---|---|---|---|
| 1 | (New Zealand) (Lebanon) | Daniel King-Turner; Michael Massih | 6; 1 | 6; 1 | 6; 0 |
| 2 | (New Zealand) (Lebanon) | Artem Sitak; Karim Alayli | 6; 2 | 6; 1 | 6; 0 |
| 3 | (New Zealand) (Lebanon) | Marcus Daniell / Daniel King-Turner; Ibrahim Abou Chahine / Karim Alayli | 6; 1 | 6; 1 | 6; 1 |
| 4 | (New Zealand) (Lebanon) | Daniel King-Turner; Ibrahim Abou Chahine | 6; 0 | 6; 1 |
| 5 | (New Zealand) (Lebanon) | Artem Sitak; Michael Massih | 6; 0 | 6; 0 |

=== Sri Lanka vs. Pakistan ===
Sri Lanka
2
Sri Lanka Tennis Association, Colombo, Sri Lanka
1–3 February 2013
clay (outdoor)

Pakistan
3

| | | | 1 | 2 | 3 | 4 | 5 |
|---|---|---|---|---|---|---|---|---|
| 1 | (Sri Lanka) (Pakistan) | Dineshkanthan Thangarajah; Aqeel Khan | 6; 4 | 1; 6 | 2; 4 | | | retired |
| 2 | (Sri Lanka) (Pakistan) | Harshana Godamanna; Aisam-ul-Haq Qureshi | 7^{7} 6^{3} | 7; 5 | 7^{7} 6^{3} |
| 3 | (Sri Lanka) (Pakistan) | Harshana Godamanna / Rajeev Rajapakse; Aqeel Khan / Aisam-ul-Haq Qureshi | 2; 6 | 7^{7} 6^{0} | 6; 2 | 3; 6 | 2; 6 |
| 4 | (Sri Lanka) (Pakistan) | Harshana Godamanna; Aqeel Khan | 6; 4 | 6; 3 | 6; 4 |
| 5 | (Sri Lanka) (Pakistan) | Dineshkanthan Thangarajah; Aisam-ul-Haq Qureshi | 2; 6 | 6; 3 | 3; 6 | 3; 6 |

=== Kuwait vs. Thailand ===
Kuwait
1
Kuwait Tennis Federation Centre, Meshref, Kuwait
1–3 February 2013
hard (outdoor)

Thailand
4

| | | | 1 | 2 | 3 | 4 | 5 |
|---|---|---|---|---|---|---|---|---|
| 1 | (Kuwait) (Thailand) | Mohammed Ghareeb; Danai Udomchoke | 1; 6 | 1; 6 | 6; 4 | 6; 4 | 4; 6 |
| 2 | (Kuwait) (Thailand) | Abdullah Maqdas; Kittiphong Wachiramanowong | 6; 4 | 7^{9} 6^{7} | 3; 6 | 3; 6 | 6; 1 |
| 3 | (Kuwait) (Thailand) | Mohammed Ghareeb / Abdullah Maqdas; Pruchya Isarow / Nuttanon Kaschapanan | 6; 3 | 3; 6 | 6^{6} 7^{8} | 6^{4} 7^{7} |
| 4 | (Kuwait) (Thailand) | Abdullah Maqdas; Danai Udomchoke | 6; 2 | 0; 3 | | | | retired |
| 5 | (Kuwait) (Thailand) | Naser Al Obaidly; Pruchya Isarow | 2; 6 | 1; 6 |

=== Philippines vs. Syria ===
Philippines
3
Plantation Bay Resort & Spa, Lapu-Lapu City, Philippines
1–3 February 2013
clay (outdoor)

Syria
2

| | | | 1 | 2 | 3 | 4 | 5 |
|---|---|---|---|---|---|---|---|
| 1 | (Philippines) (Syria) | Johnny Arcilla; Issam Haitham Taweel | 6; 4 | 5; 7 | 6; 1 | 6; 2 |
| 2 | (Philippines) (Syria) | Ruben Gonzalez; Marc Abdulnour | 6; 4 | 7^{7} 6^{1} | 6; 2 |
| 3 | (Philippines) (Syria) | Vicente Elberto Anasta / Treat Conrad Huey; Marc Abdulnour / Majdi Salim | 6; 0 | 6; 3 | 2; 6 | 6; 2 |
| 4 | (Philippines) (Syria) | Vicente Elberto Anasta; Issam Haitham Taweel | 7^{10} 6^{8} | 1; 6 | 4; 6 |
| 5 | (Philippines) (Syria) | Treat Conrad Huey; Marc Abdulnour | 6^{2} 7^{7} | 2; 6 |

== Second round ==
=== Pakistan vs. New Zealand ===
Pakistan
1
Pun Hlaing Golf Club, Yangon, Myanmar
5–7 April 2013
grass (outdoor)

New Zealand
4

| | | | 1 | 2 | 3 | 4 | 5 |
|---|---|---|---|---|---|---|---|
| 1 | (Pakistan) (New Zealand) | Aqeel Khan; Artem Sitak | 7; 5 | 3; 6 | 6; 2 | 7; 5 |
| 2 | (Pakistan) (New Zealand) | Aisam Qureshi; Daniel King-Turner | 6; 2 | 3; 6 | 3; 0 | default |
| 3 | (Pakistan) (New Zealand) | Aqeel Khan / Aisam Qureshi; Marcus Daniell / Daniel King-Turner | default |
| 4 | (Pakistan) (New Zealand) | Aisam Qureshi; Daniel King-Turner | default |
| 5 | (Pakistan) (New Zealand) | Aqeel Khan; Artem Sitak | default |

=== Philippines vs. Thailand ===
Philippines
4
Plantation Bay Resort & Spa, Lapu-Lapu City, Philippines
5–7 April 2013
clay (outdoor)

Thailand
1

| | | | 1 | 2 | 3 | 4 | 5 |
|---|---|---|---|---|---|---|---|---|
| 1 | (Philippines) (Thailand) | Ruben Gonzales; Wishaya Trongcharoenchaikul | 6^{6} 7^{8} | 6; 4 | 3; 0 | | | retired |
| 2 | (Philippines) (Thailand) | Johnny Arcilla; Danai Udomchoke | 3; 6 | 2; 6 | 6; 1 | 2; 6 |
| 3 | (Philippines) (Thailand) | Francis Casey Alcantara / Treat Conrad Huey; Pruchya Isarow / Nuttanon Kadchapanan | 6; 3 | 6; 3 | 7^{7} 6^{4} |
| 4 | (Philippines) (Thailand) | Ruben Gonzales; Danai Udomchoke | 6; 4 | 6; 3 | 6; 2 |
| 5 | (Philippines) (Thailand) | Francis Casey Alcantara; Wishaya Trongcharoenchaikul | 6; 4 | 4; 6 | 6; 0 |

== Play-off ==
=== Lebanon vs. Sri Lanka ===
Lebanon
2
Automobile et Touring Club du Liban (ATCL), Jounieh, Lebanon
5–7 April 2013
clay (outdoor)

Sri Lanka
3

| | | | 1 | 2 | 3 | 4 | 5 |
|---|---|---|---|---|---|---|---|
| 1 | (Lebanon) (Sri Lanka) | Bassam Beidas; Dineshkanthan Thangarajah | 6; 1 | 6; 2 | 6; 1 |
| 2 | (Lebanon) (Sri Lanka) | Karim Alayli; Harshana Godamanna | 3; 6 | 3; 6 | 2; 6 |
| 3 | (Lebanon) (Sri Lanka) | Bassam Beidas / Patrick Chucri; Harshana Godamanna / Rajeev Rajapakse | 7^{8} 6^{6} | 6^{3} 7^{7} | 3; 6 | 4; 6 |
| 4 | (Lebanon) (Sri Lanka) | Bassam Beidas; Harshana Godamanna | 6; 4 | 6^{5} 7^{7} | 6; 3 | 6; 3 |
| 5 | (Lebanon) (Sri Lanka) | Karim Alayli; Dineshkanthan Thangarajah | 2; 6 | 4; 6 | 1; 6 |

=== Kuwait vs. Syria ===
Kuwait
3
Kuwait Tennis Federation Center, Mishref, Kuwait
5–7 April 2013
hard (outdoor)

Syria
2

| | | | 1 | 2 | 3 | 4 | 5 |
|---|---|---|---|---|---|---|---|
| 1 | (Kuwait) (Syria) | Naser Al Obaidly; Issam Haitham Taweel | 1; 6 | 5; 7 | 0; 6 |
| 2 | (Kuwait) (Syria) | Mohammed Ghareeb; Marc Abdelnour | 6; 4 | 6; 3 | 6; 4 |
| 3 | (Kuwait) (Syria) | Hassan Al Mousa / Mohammed Ghareeb; Marc Abdelnour / Majdi Salim | 6; 1 | 6; 3 | 6; 2 |
| 4 | (Kuwait) (Syria) | Mohammed Ghareeb; Issam Haitham Taweel | 6^{4} 7^{7} | 6; 3 | 6; 2 | 6; 3 |
| 5 | (Kuwait) (Syria) | Naser Al Obaidly; Marc Abdelnour | 3; 6 | 4; 6 |

== Third round ==
=== New Zealand vs. Philippines ===
New Zealand
3
Plantation Bay Resort & Spa, Lapu-Lapu City, Philippines
13–15 September 2013
clay (outdoor)

Philippines
2

| | | | 1 | 2 | 3 | 4 | 5 |
|---|---|---|---|---|---|---|---|
| 1 | (New Zealand) (Philippines) | Michael Venus; Ruben Gonzales | 4; 6 | 6; 3 | 4; 6 | 7^{7} 6^{4} | 6; 0 |
| 2 | (New Zealand) (Philippines) | Jose Statham; Johnny Arcilla | 6; 4 | 6; 2 | 6; 4 |
| 3 | (New Zealand) (Philippines) | Marcus Daniell / Artem Sitak; Francis Casey Alcantara / Treat Huey | 4; 6 | 3; 6 | 4; 6 |
| 4 | (New Zealand) (Philippines) | Jose Statham; Ruben Gonzales | 6^{2} 7^{7} | 6; 4 | 6; 1 | 5; 7 | 6; 8 |
| 5 | (New Zealand) (Philippines) | Michael Venus; Treat Huey | 5; 7 | 4; 6 | 6; 3 | 6; 1 | 6; 3 |
