= 2019 Arizona Tennis Classic – Doubles =

Doubles
- 2019 Arizona Tennis Classic

Final
- Champions: (United Kingdom) Jamie Murray (United Kingdom) Neal Skupski
- Runners-up: (United States) Austin Krajicek (New Zealand) Artem Sitak
- Score: 6–7^{(2–7)}, 7–5, [10–6]

Events
Singles	Doubles
- Arizona Tennis Classic

This was the first edition of the tournament.

Jamie Murray and Neal Skupski won the title after defeating Austin Krajicek and Artem Sitak 6–7^{(2–7)}, 7–5, [10–6] in the final.

== Seeds ==
1. (United Kingdom) Jamie Murray / (United Kingdom) Neal Skupski (champions)
2. (United States) Austin Krajicek / (New Zealand) Artem Sitak (final)
3. (India) Rohan Bopanna / (India) Divij Sharan (quarterfinals)
4. (Brazil) Marcelo Demoliner / (Denmark) Frederik Nielsen (quarterfinals)

== Draw ==
Key

- Q = Qualifier
- WC = Wild card
- LL = Lucky loser
- Alt = Alternate
- ITF = ITF entry
- PR = Protected ranking
- SR = Special ranking
- SE = Special exempt
- JE = Junior exempt
- JR = Junior Accelerator Programme entrant
- CO = College Accelerator Programme entrant
- NG = Next Gen Accelerator Program entrant
- w/o = Walkover
- r = Retired
- d = Defaulted

First round
1	(United Kingdom) J Murray (United Kingdom) N Skupski	6	7^{7}
WC	(Chinese Taipei) J Jung (United States) M Krueger	3	6^{4}
(New Zealand) M Daniell (Netherlands) W Koolhof	6	6
(Mexico) S González (Pakistan) A-u-H Qureshi	4	2
4	(Brazil) M Demoliner (Denmark) F Nielsen	6	6
(Israel) J Erlich (France) F Martin	2	4
(Australia) M Ebden (United States) R Harrison
WC	(Italy) A Arnaboldi (Italy) S Caruso	w/o
(United States) J Cerretani (United States) N Monroe	6	7
WC	(Serbia) P Krstin (Serbia) N Zimonjić	1	5
(Belgium) R Bemelmans (Canada) P Polansky	3	4
3	(India) R Bopanna (India) D Sharan	6	6
(United States) R Galloway (United States) N Lammons	3	2
(Argentina) G Andreozzi (Chile) N Jarry	6	6

Quarterfinals
1	(United Kingdom) J Murray (United Kingdom) N Skupski	6^{8}	6	[12]
(New Zealand) M Daniell (Netherlands) W Koolhof	7^{10}	4	[10]
4	(Brazil) M Demoliner (Denmark) F Nielsen	6	4	[8]
WC	(Italy) A Arnaboldi (Italy) S Caruso	3	6	[10]
(United States) J Cerretani (United States) N Monroe	6^{3}	7^{9}	[12]
3	(India) R Bopanna (India) D Sharan	7^{7}	6^{7}	[10]
(Argentina) G Andreozzi (Chile) N Jarry
2	(United States) A Krajicek (New Zealand) A Sitak	w/o

Semifinals
1	(United Kingdom) J Murray (United Kingdom) N Skupski	6^{5}	6	[11]
WC	(Italy) A Arnaboldi (Italy) S Caruso	7^{7}	0	[9]
(United States) J Cerretani (United States) N Monroe	6	4	[7]
2	(United States) A Krajicek (New Zealand) A Sitak	4	6	[10]

Final
1	(United Kingdom) J Murray (United Kingdom) N Skupski	6^{2}	7	[10]
2	(United States) A Krajicek (New Zealand) A Sitak	7^{7}	5	[6]
