= 2017 US Open – Mixed doubles =

Mixed doubles
- 2017 US Open

Final
- Champions: (Switzerland) Martina Hingis (United Kingdom) Jamie Murray
- Runners-up: (Chinese Taipei) Chan Hao-ching (New Zealand) Michael Venus
- Score: 6–1, 4–6, [10–8]

Details
- Draw: 32
- Seeds: 8

Events
Singles	men	women		boys	girls
Doubles	men	women	mixed	boys	girls
WC Singles	men	women	quad
WC Doubles	men	women	quad
Legends	men	women	mixed
- US Open

Laura Siegemund and Mate Pavić were the defending champions, but Siegemund was unable to compete due to injury. Pavić played alongside Andreja Klepač, but lost to Alicja Rosolska and Santiago González in the first round.

Martina Hingis and Jamie Murray won their second consecutive Grand Slam mixed doubles title, defeating Chan Hao-ching and Michael Venus in the final, 6–1, 4–6, [10–8].

== Seeds ==
1. (Switzerland) Martina Hingis / (United Kingdom) Jamie Murray (champions)
2. (India) Sania Mirza / (Croatia) Ivan Dodig (first round)
3. (Chinese Taipei) Chan Hao-ching / (New Zealand) Michael Venus (final)
4. (Hungary) Tímea Babos / (Brazil) Bruno Soares (quarterfinals)
5. (Australia) Casey Dellacqua / (United States) Rajeev Ram (first round)
6. (Czech Republic) Andrea Hlaváčková / (France) Édouard Roger-Vasselin (first round)
7. (Canada) Gabriela Dabrowski / (India) Rohan Bopanna (quarterfinals)
8. (Czech Republic) Lucie Hradecká / (Poland) Marcin Matkowski (quarterfinals)

== Draw ==
Key

- Q = Qualifier
- WC = Wild card
- LL = Lucky loser
- Alt = Alternate
- ITF = ITF entry
- PR = Protected ranking
- SR = Special ranking
- SE = Special exempt
- JE = Junior exempt
- JR = Junior Accelerator Programme entrant
- CO = College Accelerator Programme entrant
- NG = Next Gen Accelerator Program entrant
- w/o = Walkover
- r = Retired
- d = Defaulted

=== Finals ===
Semifinals
1	(Switzerland) Martina Hingis (United Kingdom) Jamie Murray	6	7^{10}
(United States) CoCo Vandeweghe (Romania) Horia Tecău	4	6^{8}
3	(Chinese Taipei) Chan Hao-ching (New Zealand) Michael Venus	6	7^{8}
(Australia) Anastasia Rodionova (Austria) Oliver Marach	1	6^{6}

Final
1	(Switzerland) Martina Hingis (United Kingdom) Jamie Murray	6	4	[10]
3	(Chinese Taipei) Chan Hao-ching (New Zealand) Michael Venus	1	6	[8]

=== Top half ===
First round
1	(Switzerland) M Hingis (United Kingdom) J Murray	6	6
(Germany) A-L Grönefeld (Sweden) R Lindstedt	1	4
(Czech Republic) R Voráčová (Argentina) A Molteni	3	3
(Czech Republic) K Peschke (Brazil) M Demoliner	6	6
(United States) A Spears (Colombia) JS Cabal	6	7^{8}
WC	(United States) J Loeb (United States) M Krueger	3	6^{6}
(Ukraine) O Savchuk (New Zealand) A Sitak	3	6	[10]
5	(Australia) C Dellacqua (United States) R Ram	6	4	[6]
4	(Hungary) T Babos (Brazil) B Soares	6	6
WC	(United States) S Kenin (United States) M Mmoh	2	2
(Romania) R Olaru (Croatia) N Mektić	6	6
WC	(United States) J Brady (United States) B Fratangelo	4	4
(Chinese Taipei) Y-j Chan (Serbia) N Zimonjić	6	7^{7}
(Spain) A Parra Santonja (Spain) M López	2	6^{2}
(United States) C Vandeweghe (Romania) H Tecău	6	6
6	(Czech Republic) A Hlaváčková (France) É Roger-Vasselin	1	2

Second round
1	(Switzerland) M Hingis (United Kingdom) J Murray	6	4	[11]
(Czech Republic) K Peschke (Brazil) M Demoliner	0	6	[9]
(United States) A Spears (Colombia) JS Cabal	6	6
(Ukraine) O Savchuk (New Zealand) A Sitak	2	2
4	(Hungary) T Babos (Brazil) B Soares	7	6
(Romania) R Olaru (Croatia) N Mektić	5	3
(Chinese Taipei) Y-j Chan (Serbia) N Zimonjić	4	3
(United States) C Vandeweghe (Romania) H Tecău	6	6

Quarterfinals
1	(Switzerland) M Hingis (United Kingdom) J Murray	6	2	[10]
(United States) A Spears (Colombia) JS Cabal	3	6	[8]
4	(Hungary) T Babos (Brazil) B Soares	6	1	[8]
(United States) C Vandeweghe (Romania) H Tecău	4	6	[10]

Semifinals
1	(Switzerland) M Hingis (United Kingdom) J Murray	6	7^{10}
(United States) C Vandeweghe (Romania) H Tecău	4	6^{8}

=== Bottom half ===
First round
7	(Canada) G Dabrowski (India) R Bopanna	6	4	[13]
(United Kingdom) H Watson (Finland) H Kontinen	4	6	[11]
(Spain) MJ Martínez Sánchez (United States) N Monroe	6	6
WC	(United States) K Ahn (United States) T Sandgren	4	2
(Slovenia) A Klepač (Croatia) M Pavić	3	7	[9]
(Poland) A Rosolska (Mexico) S González	6	5	[11]
WC	(United States) A Anisimova (United States) C Harrison	4	3
3	(Chinese Taipei) H-c Chan (New Zealand) M Venus	6	6
8	(Czech Republic) L Hradecká (Poland) M Matkowski	6	6
WC	(United States) L Huber (United States) D Thomas	4	4
WC	(United States) L Chirico (United States) B Klahn	4	4
(United States) R Atawo (Pakistan) A-u-H Qureshi	6	6
(Australia) An Rodionova (Austria) O Marach	6	6
WC	(United States) N Melichar (United States) J Withrow	2	4
(Latvia) J Ostapenko (France) F Martin	5	6	[10]
2	(India) S Mirza (Croatia) I Dodig	7	3	[6]

Second round
7	(Canada) G Dabrowski (India) R Bopanna	6	6
(Spain) MJ Martínez Sánchez (United States) N Monroe	3	4
(Poland) A Rosolska (Mexico) S González	3	7^{10}	[6]
3	(Chinese Taipei) H-c Chan (New Zealand) M Venus	6	6^{8}	[10]
8	(Czech Republic) L Hradecká (Poland) M Matkowski	3	6	[10]
(United States) R Atawo (Pakistan) A-u-H Qureshi	6	3	[4]
(Australia) An Rodionova (Austria) O Marach	6	6
(Latvia) J Ostapenko (France) F Martin	4	2

Quarterfinals
7	(Canada) G Dabrowski (India) R Bopanna	6	3	[8]
3	(Chinese Taipei) H-c Chan (New Zealand) M Venus	4	6	[10]
8	(Czech Republic) L Hradecká (Poland) M Matkowski	7	4	[8]
(Australia) An Rodionova (Austria) O Marach	5	6	[10]

Semifinals
3	(Chinese Taipei) H-c Chan (New Zealand) M Venus	6	7^{8}
(Australia) An Rodionova (Austria) O Marach	1	6^{6}
