= 2013 Roger Federer tennis season =

Statistics for Swiss tennis player

- Full name: Roger Federer
- Country: Switzerland
- Calendar prize money: $3,203,637

Singles
- Season record: 45–17 (72.58%)
- Calendar titles: 1
- Year-end ranking: No. 6
- Ranking change from previous year: ▼4

Grand Slam & significant results
- Australian Open: SF
- French Open: QF
- Wimbledon: 2R
- US Open: 4R
- Other tournaments
- Tour Finals: SF

Doubles
- Season record: 1–2 (33.33%)
- Calendar titles: 0
- Year-end ranking: 560
- Ranking change from previous year: ▲706
- Last updated on: 13 January 2014.

Roger Federer's 2013 tennis season officially began on 14 January at the start of the 2013 Australian Open. This season saw Federer suffer a considerable decline in form, dropping five places to number 7 in the world, his lowest ranking in 11 years, and seeing his run of 36 consecutive grand slam quarterfinals ended by a second round defeat at Wimbledon. This year also marked the first time since 2002 where Federer did not reach a major final. His only title win of the season was a victory at the Gerry Weber Open in Halle, an ATP 250 event.

The decline in form can be largely attributed to the severe back injuries Federer suffered for much of the season, hampering his play from March through October. He first injured his back in the early rounds of Indian Wells and then re-injured it in the quarterfinals of Hamburg.

== Year summary ==
=== Australian Open and early hard court season ===
==== Australian Open ====
Federer kicked off his 2013 season with an appearance at the Australian Open, where he finished in the semifinals last year. Federer began his campaign against Frenchman Benoît Paire in the first round, and swept him in straight sets. He defeated long-time rival Nikolay Davydenko in the second round in straight sets, and faced Australian Bernard Tomic in the third round. After Federer converted on a break point in the first game and held to win the set, Tomic attempted to level the game, saving six break points and bringing the second set to a tiebreak, in which he had an early lead, but Federer overcame the deficit and won the tiebreak. Federer then broke Tomic twice and gave up only one game in the third set, winning the match in under two hours. Federer defeated big serving Canadian Milos Raonic in the fourth round in straight sets, having not dropped neither a set nor a service game through the fourth round. With the win, he also extended his record of consecutive Grand Slam quarterfinal appearances to 35, a run which extends back to the 2004 Wimbledon Championships. Federer faced Jo-Wilfried Tsonga in the quarterfinals, where he and Tsonga traded breaks in the first set and brought the set to a tiebreak, which he won. Tsonga took advantage of Federer's unforced errors in the second set, breaking his serve and holding to level out the match at one set all. The third set saw Federer and Tsonga again trading breaks and playing a tiebreak, which Federer won. Tsonga recovered from a triple break point in the fourth set, and broke Federer's serve and held the lead to bring the match to a fifth set, where Federer broke Tsonga and won the match after four match points and three and a half hours. With his win, Federer advanced to his tenth straight semifinal at the Australian Open. Federer played Andy Murray in the semifinals, and found himself down one set after Murray took advantage of Federer's poor first serves to break Federer's serve and hold for the lead. The second set went to a tiebreak, which Federer won after capitalizing on some mistakes from Murray. Murray then came back in the third set, and, with the help of two line calls that went in his favor, broke Federer and held to regain a one-set lead. Federer held an early lead in the fourth set after breaking Murray, but Murray broke back on an unforced error from Federer. Momentum then shifted in favor of Murray, who came close to winning the match, but Federer forced the set to go to a tiebreak, which he won. In the fifth set, Federer was unable to respond to aces and winners from Murray, giving up two break points and losing the match in four hours.

==== Rotterdam Open ====
Federer next played at the ABN AMRO World Tennis Tournament in Rotterdam, entering as defending champion. He played Grega Žemlja of Slovenia in the first round, and blew past him, winning in straight sets in less than an hour. He next played wildcard Thiemo de Bakker of the Netherlands, and defeated him in straight sets in just over an hour. He played Frenchman Julien Benneteau in the quarterfinals, and found himself down one set after unforced errors led to his serve being broken. Federer then fought to secure the second set, but ultimately failed after missing a break point opportunity.

==== Dubai Tennis Championships ====
Following the loss of his Rotterdam title, Federer next attempted to defend his title at the Dubai Tennis Championships in Dubai. He faced Tunisian wildcard Malek Jaziri in the first round, and dropped the first set after Jaziri secured his first and only break point in the match. Federer then took charge of the match, winning twelve of the next fourteen games to secure a win. In the second round, Federer played Marcel Granollers of Spain, and broke Granollers' serve once in each set en route to a straight-sets victory. Federer then played perennial rival Nikolay Davydenko in the third round, and flew past him in less than an hour to a second straight-sets victory. He lost to Tomáš Berdych in the semifinals in a close match, while blowing three match points in the second set tiebreak.

==== Indian Wells Masters ====
At the first Masters 1000 series event of the year, Federer once again entered as defending champion at Indian Wells. After receiving a bye in the first round, he faced Denis Istomin of Uzbekistan in the second round and defeated him in straight sets, completing the match in just under an hour. He played Croatian Ivan Dodig in the third round and advanced again in straight sets, dropping only four games en route to a victory in just over an hour. Federer next faced Swiss compatriot Stanislas Wawrinka. He won the match in three tight sets, nearly losing the match after Wawrinka broke in the third set. However, Federer held on to win the last set, and found perennial foe Rafael Nadal in the quarterfinals. Federer, however, entered the match having suffered a back injury in the previous round and was defeated in straight sets. He then continued with his pre-planned decision to take a two-month break from the sport, skipping the mandatory Masters 1000 tournament in Miami under an exception from the ATP, which allows older players to relax their schedules, and the non-mandatory Masters 1000 tournament in Monte Carlo.

=== Spring clay court season and French Open ===
==== Madrid Open ====
Federer next competed on clay at the Mutua Madrid Open, where he was the defending champion. Federer played Radek Štěpánek of the Czech Republic in the second round after a bye in the first round, and defeated him in straight sets. Federer then met Kei Nishikori of Japan in the third round. In the first set, Federer allowed Nishikori to convert on a break point opportunity, and Nishikori held the advantage to take the set. Federer came back in the second set, relying on strong shot-making to win five straight games and level the match at one set all. Federer's serve faltered in the third, and uncharacteristic errors from Federer, as well as strong play from Nishikori, meant that the Japanese number 1 defeated Federer for the first time in his career. This was Federer's earliest exit at the event since 2003, when the event was held as the Stuttgart Masters.

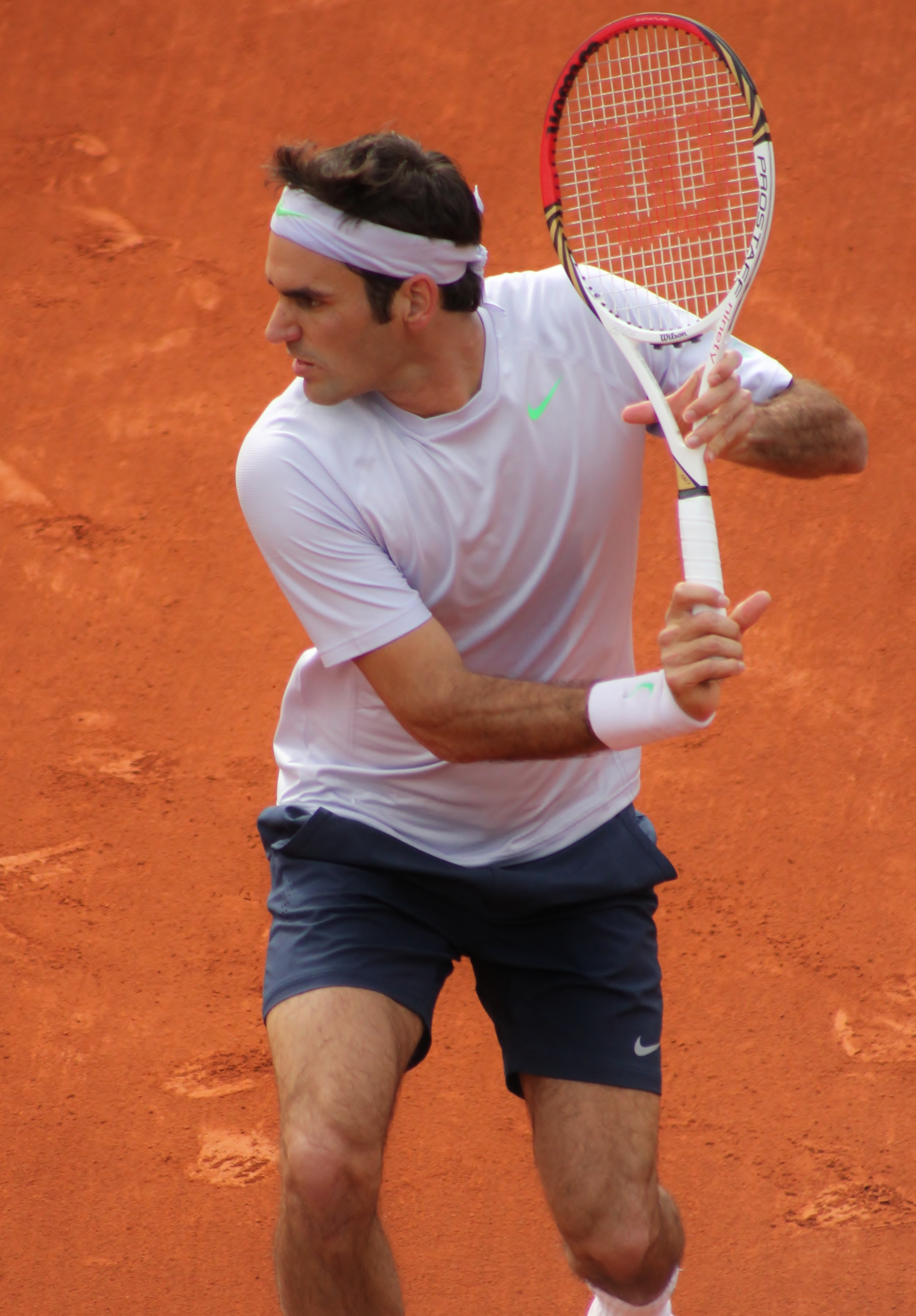
Federer at the 2013 French Open.

==== Italian Open ====
Federer played at the Italian Open in Rome, where he finished in the semifinals the previous year. After a bye in the first round, Federer played Potito Starace in the second round, dropping only seven points on serve and breaking Starace four times en route to a victory in straight sets in 51 minutes. He faced Gilles Simon of France in the third round, and raced past Simon in similar style, winning in just over an hour after again dropping only three games. Federer played Jerzy Janowicz of Poland in the quarterfinals. In the first set, Federer and Janowicz traded games until Federer found a late break point, which he converted to take the set. Janowicz broke Federer in the first game of the second set and held to serve for the set, but Federer broke back and won the tiebreak to clinch the match. He played Benoît Paire of France in the semifinals. Paire held an early lead in the first before Federer broke back and won a tight tiebreak. Federer then broke early in the second set and held to win in straight sets. He played Rafael Nadal in his first final of the year, but fell short against a hot-handed Nadal, committing multiple unforced errors and having his serve broken five times en route to a loss in straight sets in just over an hour.

==== French Open ====
Federer next competed at the French Open, where he finished in the semifinals the previous year. He played qualifier Pablo Carreño-Busta of Spain in the opening round, and won in straight sets, converting all seven of his break points to move into the second round, where he swept past qualifier Somdev Devvarman of India, dropping only five games en route to a victory in straight sets. He faced Frenchman Julien Benneteau, who had beaten him earlier in the year, in the third round. After a break of serve by Benneteau to start off the match, Federer rebounded and took the first set. Benneteau tried to make inroads on Federer's serve, but Federer continued to dominate, winning the next two sets to move to the fourth round, where he faced Frenchman Gilles Simon. Federer won the first set comfortably, but Simon began to fight back. Federer lost his rhythm after he fell on the baseline in the second set, and Simon capitalized to take the set and level the match at one set all. Simon took advantage of more unforced errors from Federer and won the third set, but Federer found his rhythm again and broke Simon's serve in the fourth, holding to level the match. Federer then secured an early break in the fifth and held to win the match, becoming the fourth person to have 900 wins on the ATP World Tour. He played Jo-Wilfried Tsonga in the quarterfinals, where, after a decent start, Federer lost an early break advantage to Tsonga, and Tsonga broke again to take the first set. The next two sets saw Tsonga take a foothold on the match as numerous errors plagued Federer. Tsonga eventually won the match in straight sets.

=== Grass court season and Wimbledon ===
==== Halle Open ====
Federer played at the Gerry Weber Open in Halle, where he was the finalist last year. He played German wildcard Cedrik-Marcel Stebe in the second round. Though Federer struggled with his serve and made quite a few errors, including one in the first set which allowed Stebe to break his serve, Federer dominated most of the match and won in straight sets, marking his fortieth win at the Gerry Weber Open. He played German wildcard Mischa Zverev in the quarterfinals and swept past Zverev, not allowing him any games and breaking him a total of six times en route to a victory in forty minutes. Federer achieved his second double bagel of his career, his first since he double-bageled Gastón Gaudio at the 2005 Tennis Masters Cup. He then faced defending champion Tommy Haas in the semifinal. In a tight first set, Federer gave up a break point in the sixth game of the set, and Haas held the lead to win the set. The second set saw Federer win an early break point and level the match at one set all. Federer then broke Haas to love and held the lead to win the match. In the final, Federer played Russian Mikhail Youzhny. After wasted break point opportunities and unforced errors led to Youzhny edging Federer in the first set tiebreak, Federer improved his game and won the match to claim his first title of the season, tying John McEnroe for the third-most number of ATP titles won by a male player in the Open Era.

==== Wimbledon ====
Federer played at the Wimbledon Championships, where he was defending champion and vying to match Rafael Nadal's record of 8 titles at a single Grand Slam tournament, which Nadal had just achieved at the French Open two weeks earlier. Federer played Victor Hănescu of Romania in the first round, and dropped only five games en route to a straight-sets win in just over an hour. He played 116th-ranked Sergiy Stakhovsky of Ukraine in the second round, and had a one-set lead before dropping the next three sets and losing the match, unable to hold leads and convert on crucial points. The loss ended Federer's record streak of 36 consecutive Grand Slam quarterfinal appearances. This also marked his earliest loss at a Grand Slam tournament since the 2003 French Open, his first loss to a player ranked outside of the top 100 since losing to Richard Gasquet in 2005 (ranked 101st at the time). With Rafael Nadal's loss in the first round, this also was the first time ever that, when both of them were entered in a Grand Slam, that neither have made it to the second week. All of this, coupled with a slew of other player withdrawals, retirements, and upsets have led that day to be referred to as Black Wednesday.

=== Summer clay court season ===
Federer added two outdoor clay events to his schedule before the US Open hard court season begins.

==== German Open ====
Federer played at the German Open Tennis Championships in Hamburg as a wildcard. Federer won the title in Hamburg four times when it was an ATP Masters Series event, but did not play there since 2008, when he was a finalist. Federer announced before his first round match in Hamburg that he was changing his racquet for the second time in his career (the first change occurred in 2002 just prior to the tournament in Hamburg of that year), upgrading from a 90-inch frame to a 98-inch frame. His first match was against German Daniel Brands, and he earned his first victory with his new racquet, rallying against strong play by Brands after dropping the first set. He next played Jan Hájek of the Czech Republic, and defeated him in straight sets after wasting many break and match points. He played Florian Mayer in the quarterfinals, and dropped his first set against Mayer in a tough three-set victory. In the semifinals, he played qualifier Federico Delbonis of Argentina for the first time, but lost in straight set, failing to convert break and set points as Delbonis took advantage to win both set tiebreaks.

==== Swiss Open ====
Federer next played at the Swiss Open. It was the first time Federer had participated in the Swiss Open since 2004. The tournament honored Federer's return by presenting him with a Swiss cow named Desiree. Despite the excitement over his return to the event, he was defeated in his opening match by Daniel Brands, his first opening-match loss since Rome in 2010. After the loss, Federer revealed that he had suffered a serious back injury several days before in Hamburg, and that he had taken anti-inflammatories and had been unable to practice.

=== US Open Series and US Open ===
==== Cincinnati Masters ====
After withdrawing from the Rogers Cup, Federer played at the Western & Southern Open in Cincinnati, where he was the champion last year. Following a first-round bye, Federer played German Philipp Kohlschreiber in the second round. After speeding through the opening set, Federer found some trouble against Kohlschreiber in the second set, but managed to convert his second match point during the set tiebreak, keeping his winning streak against Kohlschreiber alive with a straight sets win. He played Tommy Haas in the third round, and came close to losing after Haas held a one-set, one-break advantage. Federer rallied to force a third set and won the match in under two hours. Federer next played Rafael Nadal in the quarterfinals. He broke Nadal late in the first set, playing fast and aggressive tennis with sharply angled, clean and powerful groundstrokes off both wings and frequent attacks at the net. He had opportunities to threaten Nadal on Nadal's serve in the second set, but this went awry, as Nadal continued to fight and as Federer began to rack up unforced errors. Federer's serve folded at the end of the second set and the start of the third, but he saved four match points on Nadal's serve before a wide forehand from Nadal on match point went unchallenged by Federer. Federer fell down the rankings again to No. 7, his lowest in over a decade.

==== US Open ====
At the US Open in New York Federer played Slovenian Grega Žemlja in the first round, and won in straight sets after a lapse of concentration resulted in a drop of his serve in the third set. He next played Carlos Berlocq of Argentina in the second round, and swept him in straight sets, dropping only six games en route to a win in just over one and a half hours. He next played Adrian Mannarino in the third round, and won in similar fashion, holding his serve and dropping only five games in the match. In a surprise, Federer then lost to Tommy Robredo, a player he had beaten ten straight times, in straight sets in another error strewn display.

=== Asian Swing ===
==== Shanghai Masters ====
Federer's first post-US Open tournament was at the Shanghai Masters. He defeated Andreas Seppi in the second round in straight sets, but dropped his next match in the third round against Gaël Monfils in three sets. The loss marked only his second defeat against the Frenchman.

=== European Indoor Season ===
==== Swiss Indoors ====
Federer next played in the Swiss Indoors. He defeated Adrian Mannarino in the first round in straight sets, and then came back from a one-set deficit against Denis Istomin in under two hours. In the quarterfinal, Roger Federer faced Grigor Dimitrov, nicknamed "Baby Federer", for the first time. Dimitrov was defeated in straight sets, but Federer had to recover from a service break down and force a tie-break decision in the second set. In the semifinal round, Federer defeated Vasek Pospisil in a very tight three-setter. After winning the first set comfortably by breaking Pospisil's serve twice, Federer served for the match in the second set but squandered the opportunity. Then, Federer's serve was broken early in the deciding set, but he managed to return the service break and was able to serve for the match successfully at his second chance. Federer faced Juan Martín del Potro for the title, in a repeat of the previous year's final that saw del Potro emerge again victorious. He fell short again in another three-set battle against the Argentine. Despite the loss, the match saw Federer display significant improvement in form after a sluggish run to the final.

==== Paris Masters ====
Federer next played in Paris at the BNP Paribas Masters, knowing that he would qualify for the ATP World Tour Finals if he won his opening match against Kevin Anderson. With his win over Anderson, he became the sixth player to qualify (seventh if including the injured Andy Murray) for the Finals. He made it to the semifinals by subsequently beating Philipp Kohlschreiber and Juan Martín del Potro, the latter whom he faced less than a week earlier in the final in Basel. His win over del Potro was only his second of the season over a top-10 player, first since January, and only top-5 win thus far. Federer met Novak Djokovic in the semifinals for their 30th career meeting, where he ultimately lost in three sets.

==== ATP World Tour Finals ====
Federer entered the ATP World Tour Finals as the No. 6 seed and was drawn in group B with Novak Djokovic, Juan Martín del Potro, and Richard Gasquet. Before the tournament began, Federer received three ATP World Tour Awards: the Fans' Favourite Award for a record eleventh consecutive time, the Stefan Edberg Sportsmanship award for a record ninth time, and the Arthur Ashe Humanitarian Award for a record-tying second time. Federer played his first round-robin match against Djokovic, only 3 days after their last match in Paris, and he again lost in three sets. Federer had not lost an opening match in the World Tour Finals since 2008. Federer then defeated Gasquet in straight sets. With Novak Djokovic having won the group just after two round-robin matches, Federer played his last round-robin match against del Potro. It was the third match between them in the last three weeks of the season. Federer won, but not without saving a breakpoint, and booked a place in the semifinals against Group A winner Rafael Nadal, who had won all his three round-robin matches and successfully clinched the No. 1 ranking for the 2013 season. Federer lost the semifinal match in straight sets, only managing to break Nadal's serve once in the first set. It was Federer's fourth consecutive defeat against Nadal in the 2013 season. At the end of the tournament, Federer overtook Tomas Berdych in the singles rankings and finished the season as world No. 6, his lowest since 2002.

== All matches ==
=== Singles matches ===
Tournament	Match	Round	Opponent	Rank	Result	Score
Australian Open; Melbourne, Australia; Grand Slam; Hard, outdoor 14–27 January 2013	1077	1R	(France) Benoît Paire	46	Win	6–2, 6–4, 6–1
Australian Open; Melbourne, Australia; Grand Slam; Hard, outdoor 14–27 January 2013	1078	2R	(Russia) Nikolay Davydenko	40	Win	6–3, 6–4, 6–4
Australian Open; Melbourne, Australia; Grand Slam; Hard, outdoor 14–27 January 2013	1079	3R	(Australia) Bernard Tomic	42	Win	6–4, 7–6^{(7–5)}, 6–1
Australian Open; Melbourne, Australia; Grand Slam; Hard, outdoor 14–27 January 2013	1080	4R	(Canada) Milos Raonic	15	Win	6–4, 7–6^{(7–4)}, 6–2
Australian Open; Melbourne, Australia; Grand Slam; Hard, outdoor 14–27 January 2013	1081	QF	(France) Jo-Wilfried Tsonga	8	Win	7–6^{(7–4)}, 4–6, 7–6^{(7–4)}, 3–6, 6–3
Australian Open; Melbourne, Australia; Grand Slam; Hard, outdoor 14–27 January 2013	1082	SF	(United Kingdom) Andy Murray	3	Loss	4–6, 7–6^{(7–5)}, 3–6, 7–6^{(7–2)}, 2–6
ABN AMRO World Tennis Tournament; Rotterdam, the Netherlands; ATP World Tour 500; Hard, indoor 11–17 February 2013	1083	1R	(Slovenia) Grega Žemlja	4	Win	6–3, 6–1
ABN AMRO World Tennis Tournament; Rotterdam, the Netherlands; ATP World Tour 500; Hard, indoor 11–17 February 2013	1084	2R	(Netherlands) Thiemo de Bakker	123	Win	6–3, 6–4
ABN AMRO World Tennis Tournament; Rotterdam, the Netherlands; ATP World Tour 500; Hard, indoor 11–17 February 2013	1085	QF	(France) Julien Benneteau	39	Loss	3–6, 5–7
Dubai Duty Free Tennis Championships; Dubai, United Arab Emirates; ATP World Tour 500; Hard, outdoor 25 February – 2 March 2013	1086	1R	(Tunisia) Malek Jaziri	128	Win	5–7, 6–0, 6–2
Dubai Duty Free Tennis Championships; Dubai, United Arab Emirates; ATP World Tour 500; Hard, outdoor 25 February – 2 March 2013	1087	2R	(Spain) Marcel Granollers	34	Win	6–3, 6–4
Dubai Duty Free Tennis Championships; Dubai, United Arab Emirates; ATP World Tour 500; Hard, outdoor 25 February – 2 March 2013	1088	QF	(Russia) Nikolay Davydenko	46	Win	6–2, 6–2
Dubai Duty Free Tennis Championships; Dubai, United Arab Emirates; ATP World Tour 500; Hard, outdoor 25 February – 2 March 2013	1089	SF	(Czech Republic) Tomáš Berdych	6	Loss	6–3, 6–7^{(8–10)}, 4–6
BNP Paribas Open; Indian Wells, United States; ATP World Tour Masters 1000; Hard, outdoor 4–17 March 2013	–	1R	Bye			
BNP Paribas Open; Indian Wells, United States; ATP World Tour Masters 1000; Hard, outdoor 4–17 March 2013	1090	2R	(Uzbekistan) Denis Istomin	43	Win	6–2, 6–3
BNP Paribas Open; Indian Wells, United States; ATP World Tour Masters 1000; Hard, outdoor 4–17 March 2013	1091	3R	(Croatia) Ivan Dodig	60	Win	6–3, 6–1
BNP Paribas Open; Indian Wells, United States; ATP World Tour Masters 1000; Hard, outdoor 4–17 March 2013	1092	4R	(Switzerland) Stanislas Wawrinka	18	Win	6–3, 6–7^{(4–7)}, 7–5
BNP Paribas Open; Indian Wells, United States; ATP World Tour Masters 1000; Hard, outdoor 4–17 March 2013	1093	QF	(Spain) Rafael Nadal	5	Loss	4–6, 2–6
Mutua Madrid Open; Madrid, Spain; ATP World Tour Masters 1000; Clay, outdoor 7–13 May 2013	–	1R	Bye			
Mutua Madrid Open; Madrid, Spain; ATP World Tour Masters 1000; Clay, outdoor 7–13 May 2013	1094	2R	(Czech Republic) Radek Štěpánek	48	Win	6–3, 6–3
Mutua Madrid Open; Madrid, Spain; ATP World Tour Masters 1000; Clay, outdoor 7–13 May 2013	1095	3R	(Japan) Kei Nishikori	16	Loss	4–6, 6–1, 2–6
Internazionali BNL d'Italia; Rome, Italy; ATP World Tour Masters 1000; Clay, outdoor 13–19 May 2013	–	1R	Bye			
Internazionali BNL d'Italia; Rome, Italy; ATP World Tour Masters 1000; Clay, outdoor 13–19 May 2013	1096	2R	(Italy) Potito Starace	293	Win	6–1, 6–2
Internazionali BNL d'Italia; Rome, Italy; ATP World Tour Masters 1000; Clay, outdoor 13–19 May 2013	1097	3R	(France) Gilles Simon	17	Win	6–1, 6–2
Internazionali BNL d'Italia; Rome, Italy; ATP World Tour Masters 1000; Clay, outdoor 13–19 May 2013	1098	QF	(Poland) Jerzy Janowicz	24	Win	6–4, 7–6^{(7–2)}
Internazionali BNL d'Italia; Rome, Italy; ATP World Tour Masters 1000; Clay, outdoor 13–19 May 2013	1099	SF	(France) Benoît Paire	36	Win	7–6^{(7–5)}, 6–4
Internazionali BNL d'Italia; Rome, Italy; ATP World Tour Masters 1000; Clay, outdoor 13–19 May 2013	1100	F	(Spain) Rafael Nadal	5	Loss	1–6, 3–6
French Open; Paris, France; Grand Slam; Clay, outdoor 27 May – 9 June 2013	1101	1R	(Spain) Pablo Carreño-Busta	164	Win	6–2, 6–2, 6–3
French Open; Paris, France; Grand Slam; Clay, outdoor 27 May – 9 June 2013	1102	2R	(India) Somdev Devvarman	188	Win	6–2, 6–1, 6–1
French Open; Paris, France; Grand Slam; Clay, outdoor 27 May – 9 June 2013	1103	3R	(France) Julien Benneteau	32	Win	6–3, 6–4, 7–5
French Open; Paris, France; Grand Slam; Clay, outdoor 27 May – 9 June 2013	1104	4R	(France) Gilles Simon	18	Win	6–1, 4–6, 2–6, 6–2, 6–3
French Open; Paris, France; Grand Slam; Clay, outdoor 27 May – 9 June 2013	1105	QF	(France) Jo-Wilfried Tsonga	8	Loss	5–7, 3–6, 3–6
Gerry Weber Open; Halle, Germany; ATP World Tour 250; Grass, outdoor 10–16 June 2013	–	1R	Bye			
Gerry Weber Open; Halle, Germany; ATP World Tour 250; Grass, outdoor 10–16 June 2013	1106	2R	(Germany) Cedrik-Marcel Stebe	166	Win	6–3, 6–3
Gerry Weber Open; Halle, Germany; ATP World Tour 250; Grass, outdoor 10–16 June 2013	1107	QF	(Germany) Mischa Zverev	156	Win	6–0, 6–0
Gerry Weber Open; Halle, Germany; ATP World Tour 250; Grass, outdoor 10–16 June 2013	1108	SF	(Germany) Tommy Haas	11	Win	3–6, 6–3, 6–4
Gerry Weber Open; Halle, Germany; ATP World Tour 250; Grass, outdoor 10–16 June 2013	1109	F	(Russia) Mikhail Youzhny	29	Win (1)	6–7^{(5–7)}, 6–3, 6–4
Wimbledon Championships; London, United Kingdom; Grand Slam; Grass, outdoor 24 June – 7 July 2013	1110	1R	(Romania) Victor Hănescu	47	Win	6–3, 6–2, 6–0
Wimbledon Championships; London, United Kingdom; Grand Slam; Grass, outdoor 24 June – 7 July 2013	1111	2R	(Ukraine) Sergiy Stakhovsky	116	Loss	7–6^{(7–5)}, 6–7^{(5–7)}, 5–7, 6–7^{(5–7)}
German Tennis Championships; Hamburg, Germany; ATP World Tour 500; Clay, outdoor 15–21 July 2013	–	1R	Bye			
German Tennis Championships; Hamburg, Germany; ATP World Tour 500; Clay, outdoor 15–21 July 2013	1112	2R	(Germany) Daniel Brands	58	Win	3–6, 6–3, 6–2
German Tennis Championships; Hamburg, Germany; ATP World Tour 500; Clay, outdoor 15–21 July 2013	1113	3R	(Czech Republic) Jan Hájek	140	Win	6–4, 6–3
German Tennis Championships; Hamburg, Germany; ATP World Tour 500; Clay, outdoor 15–21 July 2013	1114	QF	(Germany) Florian Mayer	45	Win	7–6^{(7–4)}, 3–6, 7–5
German Tennis Championships; Hamburg, Germany; ATP World Tour 500; Clay, outdoor 15–21 July 2013	1115	SF	(Argentina) Federico Delbonis	114	Loss	6–7^{(7–9)}, 6–7^{(4–7)}
Crédit Agricole Suisse Open Gstaad; Gstaad, Switzerland; ATP World Tour 250; Clay, outdoor 22–28 July 2013	–	1R	Bye			
Crédit Agricole Suisse Open Gstaad; Gstaad, Switzerland; ATP World Tour 250; Clay, outdoor 22–28 July 2013	1116	2R	(Germany) Daniel Brands	55	Loss	3–6, 4–6
Western & Southern Open; Cincinnati, United States; ATP World Tour Masters 1000; Hard, outdoor 12–16 August 2013	–	1R	Bye			
Western & Southern Open; Cincinnati, United States; ATP World Tour Masters 1000; Hard, outdoor 12–16 August 2013	1117	2R	(Germany) Philipp Kohlschreiber	26	Win	6–3, 7–6^{(9–7)}
Western & Southern Open; Cincinnati, United States; ATP World Tour Masters 1000; Hard, outdoor 12–16 August 2013	1118	3R	(Germany) Tommy Haas	13	Win	1–6, 7–5, 6–3
Western & Southern Open; Cincinnati, United States; ATP World Tour Masters 1000; Hard, outdoor 12–16 August 2013	1119	QF	(Spain) Rafael Nadal	3	Loss	7–5, 4–6, 3–6
US Open; New York, United States; Grand Slam; Hard, outdoor 26 August – 8 September 2013	1120	1R	(Slovenia) Grega Žemlja	62	Win	6–3, 6–2, 7–5
US Open; New York, United States; Grand Slam; Hard, outdoor 26 August – 8 September 2013	1121	2R	(Argentina) Carlos Berlocq	48	Win	6–3, 6–2, 6–1
US Open; New York, United States; Grand Slam; Hard, outdoor 26 August – 8 September 2013	1122	3R	(France) Adrian Mannarino	63	Win	6–3, 6–0, 6–2
US Open; New York, United States; Grand Slam; Hard, outdoor 26 August – 8 September 2013	1123	4R	(Spain) Tommy Robredo	22	Loss	6–7^{(3–7)}, 3–6, 4–6
Shanghai Rolex Masters; Shanghai, China; ATP World Tour Masters 1000; Hard, outdoor 7–13 October 2013	–	1R	Bye			
Shanghai Rolex Masters; Shanghai, China; ATP World Tour Masters 1000; Hard, outdoor 7–13 October 2013	1124	2R	(Italy) Andreas Seppi	22	Win	6–4, 6–3
Shanghai Rolex Masters; Shanghai, China; ATP World Tour Masters 1000; Hard, outdoor 7–13 October 2013	1125	3R	(France) Gaël Monfils	42	Loss	4–6, 7–6^{(7–5)}, 3–6
Swiss Indoors Basel; Basel, Switzerland; ATP World Tour 500; Hard, indoor 21–27 October 2013	1126	1R	(France) Adrian Mannarino	62	Win	6–4, 6–2
Swiss Indoors Basel; Basel, Switzerland; ATP World Tour 500; Hard, indoor 21–27 October 2013	1127	2R	(Uzbekistan) Denis Istomin	48	Win	4–6, 6–3, 6–2
Swiss Indoors Basel; Basel, Switzerland; ATP World Tour 500; Hard, indoor 21–27 October 2013	1128	QF	(Bulgaria) Grigor Dimitrov	22	Win	6–3, 7–6^{(7–2)}
Swiss Indoors Basel; Basel, Switzerland; ATP World Tour 500; Hard, indoor 21–27 October 2013	1129	SF	(Canada) Vasek Pospisil	40	Win	6–3, 6–7^{(3–7)}, 7–5
Swiss Indoors Basel; Basel, Switzerland; ATP World Tour 500; Hard, indoor 21–27 October 2013	1130	F	(Argentina) Juan Martín del Potro	5	Loss	6–7^{(3–7)}, 6–2, 4–6
BNP Paribas Masters; Paris, France; ATP World Tour Masters 1000; Hard, indoor 28 October – 3 November 2013	–	1R	Bye			
BNP Paribas Masters; Paris, France; ATP World Tour Masters 1000; Hard, indoor 28 October – 3 November 2013	1131	2R	(South Africa) Kevin Anderson	21	Win	6–4, 6–4
BNP Paribas Masters; Paris, France; ATP World Tour Masters 1000; Hard, indoor 28 October – 3 November 2013	1132	3R	(Germany) Philipp Kohlschreiber	23	Win	6–3, 6–4
BNP Paribas Masters; Paris, France; ATP World Tour Masters 1000; Hard, indoor 28 October – 3 November 2013	1133	QF	(Argentina) Juan Martín del Potro	5	Win	6–3, 4–6, 6–3
BNP Paribas Masters; Paris, France; ATP World Tour Masters 1000; Hard, indoor 28 October – 3 November 2013	1134	SF	(Serbia) Novak Djokovic	2	Loss	6–4, 3–6, 2–6
Barclays ATP World Tour Finals; London, United Kingdom; ATP World Tour Finals; Hard, indoor 4–11 November 2013	1135	RR	(Serbia) Novak Djokovic	2	Loss	4–6, 7–6^{(7–2)}, 2–6
Barclays ATP World Tour Finals; London, United Kingdom; ATP World Tour Finals; Hard, indoor 4–11 November 2013	1136	RR	(France) Richard Gasquet	9	Win	6–4, 6–3
Barclays ATP World Tour Finals; London, United Kingdom; ATP World Tour Finals; Hard, indoor 4–11 November 2013	1137	RR	(Argentina) Juan Martín del Potro	5	Win	4–6, 7–6^{(7–2)}, 7–5
Barclays ATP World Tour Finals; London, United Kingdom; ATP World Tour Finals; Hard, indoor 4–11 November 2013	1138	SF	(Spain) Rafael Nadal	1	Loss	5–7, 3–6

=== Doubles matches ===
Tournament	Match	Round	Partner	Opponent/Rank	Result	Score
Gerry Weber Open; Halle, Germany; ATP World Tour 250; Grass, outdoor 10–16 June 2013	201	1R	(Germany) Tommy Haas	(Austria) Jürgen Melzer / #33 (Germany) Philipp Petzschner / #50	Loss	6–7^{(3–7)}, 4–6
Shanghai Rolex Masters; Shanghai, China; ATP World Tour Masters 1000; Hard, outdoor 7–13 October 2013	202	1R	(China) Ze Zhang	(South Africa) Kevin Anderson / #150 (Russia) Dmitry Tursunov / #156	Win	6–2, 6–1
Shanghai Rolex Masters; Shanghai, China; ATP World Tour Masters 1000; Hard, outdoor 7–13 October 2013	203	2R	(China) Ze Zhang	(Croatia) Ivan Dodig / #19 (Brazil) Marcelo Melo / #11	Loss	1–6, 6–1, [8–10]

== Tournament schedule ==
=== Singles schedule ===
Federer's 2013 singles tournament schedule is as follows:

Date	Championship	Location	Category	Surface	Prev. result	Prev. points	New points	Outcome
14 January 2013– 27 January 2013	Australian Open	Melbourne (AUS)	Grand Slam	Hard	SF	720	720	Semifinals (lost to Andy Murray, (4–6, 7–6^{(7–5)}, 3–6, 7–6^{(7–2)}, 2–6)
11 February 2013– 17 February 2013	ABN AMRO World Tennis Tournament	Rotterdam (NED)	ATP World Tour 500	Hard (i)	W	500	90	Quarterfinals (lost to Julien Benneteau, 3–6, 5–7)
25 February 2013– 2 March 2013	Dubai Duty Free Tennis Championships	Dubai (UAE)	ATP World Tour 500	Hard	W	500	180	Semifinals (lost to Tomas Berdych, 6–3, 6–7^{(8–10)}, 4–6)
4 March 2013– 17 March 2013	BNP Paribas Open	Indian Wells (USA)	ATP World Tour Masters 1000	Hard	W	1000	180	Quarterfinals (lost to Rafael Nadal, 4–6, 2–6)
7 May 2013– 13 May 2013	Mutua Madrid Open	Madrid (ESP)	ATP World Tour Masters 1000	Clay	W	1000	90	Third round (lost to Kei Nishikori, 4–6, 6–1, 2–6)
13 May 2013– 19 May 2013	Internazionali BNL d'Italia	Rome (ITA)	ATP World Tour Masters 1000	Clay	SF	360	600	Final (lost to Rafael Nadal, 1–6, 3–6)
27 May 2013– 9 June 2013	French Open	Paris (FRA)	Grand Slam	Clay	SF	720	360	Quarterfinals (lost to Jo-Wilfried Tsonga, 5–7, 3–6, 3–6)
10 June 2013– 16 June 2013	Gerry Weber Open	Halle (GER)	ATP World Tour 250	Grass	F	150	250	Winner (defeated Mikhail Youzhny, 6–7^{(5–7)}, 6–3, 6–4)
24 June 2013– 7 July 2013	The Championships, Wimbledon	Wimbledon (GBR)	Grand Slam	Grass	W	2000	45	Second round (lost to Sergiy Stakhovsky, 7–6^{(7–5)}, 6–7^{(5–7)}, 5–7, 6–7^{(5–7)})
15 July 2013– 21 July 2013	German Tennis Championships	Hamburg (GER)	ATP World Tour 500	Clay	A	N/A	180	Semifinals (lost to Federico Delbonis, 6–7^{(7–9)}, 6–7^{(4–7)})
22 July 2013– 28 July 2013	Crédit Agricole Suisse Open Gstaad	Gstaad (SUI)	ATP World Tour 250	Clay	A	N/A	0	Second round (lost to Daniel Brands, 3–6, 4–6)
5 August 2013– 11 August 2013	Rogers Cup	Montreal (CAN)	ATP World Tour Masters 1000	Hard	A	0	0	Withdrew
12 August 2013– 18 August 2013	Western & Southern Open	Cincinnati (USA)	ATP World Tour Masters 1000	Hard	W	1000	180	Quarterfinals (lost to Rafael Nadal, 7–5, 4–6, 3–6)
26 August 2013– 8 September 2013	US Open	New York (USA)	Grand Slam	Hard	QF	360	180	Fourth round (lost to Tommy Robredo, 6–7^{(3–7)}, 3–6, 4–6)
7 October 2013– 13 October 2013	Shanghai Rolex Masters	Shanghai (CHN)	ATP World Tour Masters 1000	Hard	SF	360	90	Third round (lost to Gaël Monfils, 4–6, 7–6^{(7–5)}, 3–6 )
21 October 2013– 27 October 2013	Swiss Indoors Basel	Basel (SUI)	ATP World Tour 500	Hard (i)	F	300	300	Final (lost to Juan Martín del Potro, 6–7^{(3–7)}, 6–2, 4–6)
28 October 2013– 3 November 2013	BNP Paribas Masters	Paris (FRA)	ATP World Tour Masters 1000	Hard (i)	A	0	360	Semifinal (lost to Novak Djokovic, 6–4, 3–6, 2–6)
4 November 2013– 11 November 2013	Barclays ATP World Tour Finals	London (GBR)	ATP World Tour Finals	Hard (i)	F	800	400	Semifinal (lost to Rafael Nadal, 5–7, 3–6)
Total year-end points						10265	4205	▼6060 difference

=== Doubles schedule ===
Date	Championship	Location	Category	Surface	Prev. result	Prev. points	New points	Outcome
10 June 2013– 16 June 2013	Gerry Weber Open	Halle (GER)	ATP World Tour 250	Grass	DNP	N/A	0	First round (lost to Melzer/Petzschner, 6–7^{(3–7)}, 4–6)
7 October 2013– 13 October 2013	Shanghai Rolex Masters	Shanghai (CHN)	ATP World Tour Masters 1000	Hard	DNP	N/A	90	Second round (lost to Dodig/Melo, 1–6, 6–1, [8–10])
Total year-end points						10	90	▲80 difference

== Yearly records ==
=== Head-to-head matchups ===
Roger Federer had a 45–17 match win–loss record in the 2013 season. His record against players who were part of the ATP rankings Top Ten at the time of their meetings was 4–10. The following list is ordered by number of wins:

- (Russia) Nikolay Davydenko 2–0
- (Germany) Tommy Haas 2–0
- (Uzbekistan) Denis Istomin 2–0
- (Germany) Philipp Kohlschreiber 2–0
- (France) Adrian Mannarino 2–0
- (France) Benoît Paire 2–0
- (France) Gilles Simon 2–0
- (Slovenia) Grega Žemlja 2–0
- (Argentina) Juan Martín del Potro 2–1
- (South Africa) Kevin Anderson 1–0
- (Netherlands) Thiemo de Bakker 1–0
- (Argentina) Carlos Berlocq 1–0
- (Spain) Pablo Carreño-Busta 1–0
- (India) Somdev Devvarman 1–0
- (Bulgaria) Grigor Dimitrov 1–0
- (Croatia) Ivan Dodig 1–0
- (France) Richard Gasquet 1–0
- (Spain) Marcel Granollers 1–0
- (Czech Republic) Jan Hájek 1–0
- (Romania) Victor Hănescu 1–0
- (Poland) Jerzy Janowicz 1–0
- (Tunisia) Malek Jaziri 1–0
- (Germany) Florian Mayer 1–0
- (Canada) Vasek Pospisil 1–0
- (Canada) Milos Raonic 1–0
- (Italy) Andreas Seppi 1–0
- (Italy) Potito Starace 1–0
- (Germany) Cedrik-Marcel Stebe 1–0
- (Czech Republic) Radek Štěpánek 1–0
- (Australia) Bernard Tomic 1–0
- (Switzerland) Stanislas Wawrinka 1–0
- (Russia) Mikhail Youzhny 1–0
- (Germany) Mischa Zverev 1–0
- (France) Julien Benneteau 1–1
- (Germany) Daniel Brands 1–1
- (France) Jo-Wilfried Tsonga 1–1
- (Czech Republic) Tomas Berdych 0–1
- (Argentina) Federico Delbonis 0–1
- (France) Gaël Monfils 0–1
- (United Kingdom) Andy Murray 0–1
- (Japan) Kei Nishikori 0–1
- (Spain) Tommy Robredo 0–1
- (Ukraine) Sergiy Stakhovsky 0–1
- (Serbia) Novak Djokovic 0–2
- (Spain) Rafael Nadal 0–4

=== Finals ===
==== Singles: 3 (1–2) ====
Category Grand Slam (0–0) ATP World Tour Finals (0–0) ATP World Tour Masters 1000 (0–1) ATP World Tour 500 (0–1) ATP World Tour 250 (1–0)	Titles by surface Hard (0–1) Clay (0–1) Grass (1–0)	Titles by setting Outdoors (1–1) Indoors (0–1)

Result	No.	Date	Category	Tournament	Surface	Opponent	Score
Runner-up	35.	19 May 2013	Masters 1000	Italian Open, Italy (3)	Clay	(Spain) Rafael Nadal	1–6, 3–6
Winner	77.	16 June 2013	250 Series	Halle Open, Germany (6)	Grass	(Russia) Mikhail Youzhny	6–7^{(5–7)}, 6–3, 6–4
Runner-up	36.	27 October 2013	500 Series	Swiss Indoors, Switzerland (5)	Hard (i)	(Argentina) Juan Martín del Potro	6–7^{(3–7)}, 6–2, 4–6

=== Earnings ===
Event	Prize money	Year-to-date
Australian Open	A$500,000	$526,650
ABN AMRO World Tennis Tournament	€31,440	$568,656
Dubai Duty Free Tennis Championships	$91,750	$660,406
BNP Paribas Open	$104,000	$764,406
Mutua Madrid Open	€41,610	$818,970
Internazionali BNL d'Italia	€246,000	$1,138,425
French Open	€190,000	$1,384,057
Gerry Weber Open	€125,190	$1,549,495
Wimbledon Championships	£38,000	$1,608,069
bet–at–home Open – German Tennis Championships	€53,340	$1,677,752
Crédit Agricole Suisse Open Gstaad	€7,100	$1,687,081
Western & Southern Open	$73,255	$1,760,336
US Open	$165,000	$1,925,336
Shanghai Rolex Masters	$54,910	$1,980,246
Swiss Indoors Basel	€156,800	$2,194,811
BNP Paribas Masters	€128,850	$2,372,637
Barclays ATP World Tour Finals	$426,000	$2,798,637
Bonus Pool	$405,000	$3,203,637
		$3,203,637

Figures in United States dollars (USD) unless noted.

=== Awards ===
- Stefan Edberg Sportsmanship Award
  - Record ninth award in career (third consecutive)
- ATPWorldTour.com Fans' Favourite
  - Record eleventh consecutive award in career
- Arthur Ashe Humanitarian Award
  - Record-tying second award in career

== See also ==
- 2013 ATP World Tour
- 2013 Rafael Nadal tennis season
- 2013 Novak Djokovic tennis season
- 2013 Andy Murray tennis season
