= 2013 Novak Djokovic tennis season =

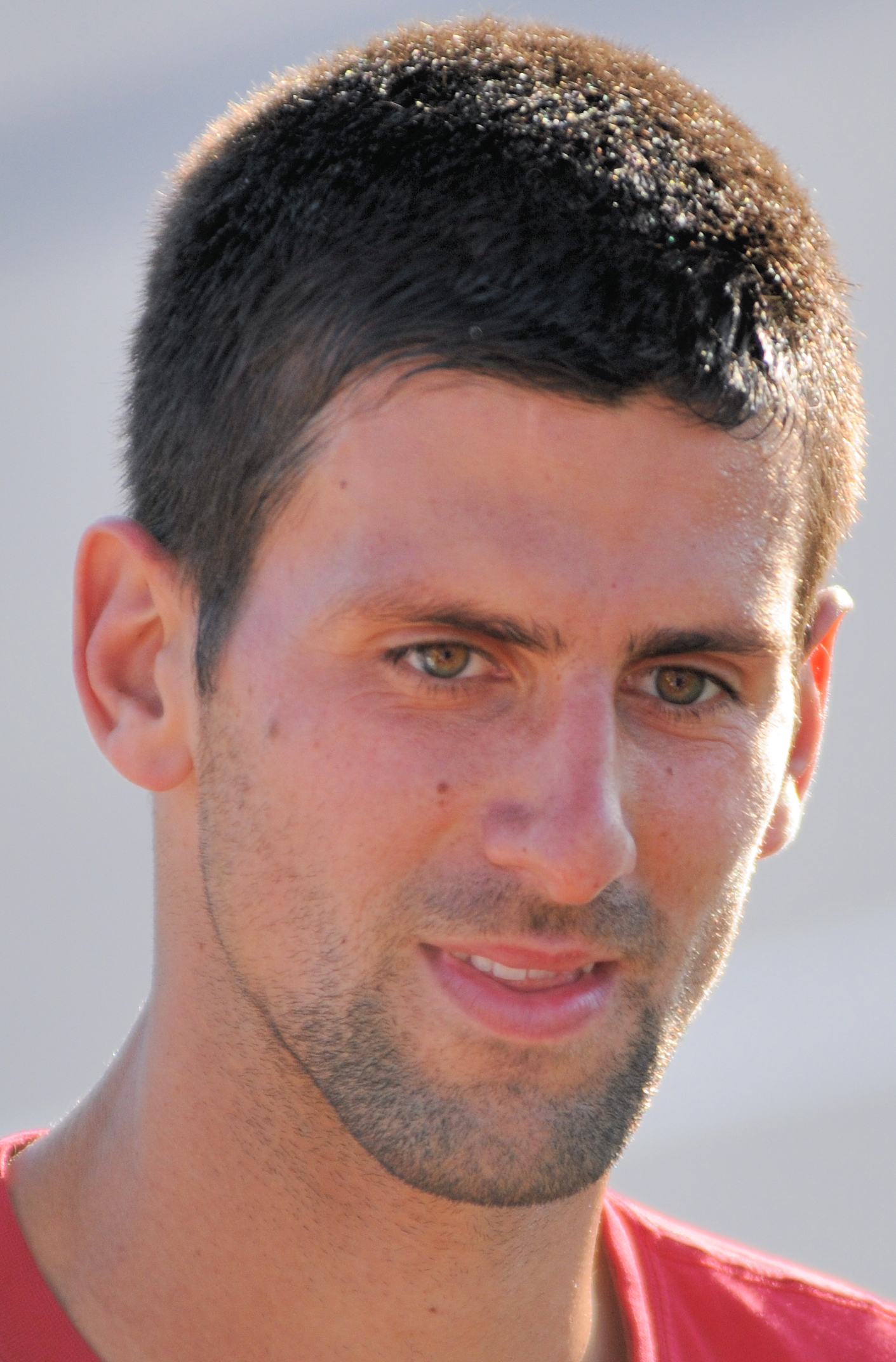
- a close up of Djokovic in Indian Wells.
- Full name: Novak Djokovic
- Country: Serbia
- Calendar prize money: $12,447,947 (singles & doubles)

Singles
- Season record: 74–9 (89.15%)
- Calendar titles: 7
- Year-end ranking: No. 2
- Ranking change from previous year: ▼1

Grand Slam & significant results
- Australian Open: W
- French Open: SF
- Wimbledon: F
- US Open: F
- Other tournaments
- Tour Finals: W

Doubles
- Season record: 2–1
- Current ranking: 572
- Ranking change from previous year: ▼30

The 2013 Novak Djokovic tennis season commenced on 31 December 2012 with the start of the 2013 ATP World Tour.

== Yearly summary ==
Novak Djokovic began the 2013 season in Australia. Alongside Ana Ivanovic, he represented Serbia at the 2013 Hopman Cup, where he played four singles and four mixed doubles matches. The Serbian duo finished runner-up, losing 1–2 to Spanish duo Anabel Medina Garrigues and Fernando Verdasco in the final. Two weeks later Djokovic took part in the first competitive tournament of the year – 2013 Australian Open as the two-time defending champion. On the road to the final Novak defeated Stanislas Wawrinka in an epic five-hour meeting that finished 12–10 in the decisive set. Along the way, he defeated two Top 10 players – Tomáš Berdych and David Ferrer. In the final he met the No. 3 seed Andy Murray, whom he defeated in four sets to take his third straight title at Melbourne Park, the first man in the open era to do so.

The following week, Djokovic represented his country in 2013 Davis Cup and helped Serbia to beat Belgium 3–2, winning his only match against Olivier Rochus in straight sets.

At the end of the month Novak took part in the 2013 Dubai Tennis Championships, which he won without dropping a single set. In the final he defeated Berdych, winning his fourth Dubai title and maintaining a 100 percent start to the season.

After the short break Djokovic headed to the United States, where traditionally the first two Masters tournaments are played. In Indian Wells, Novak was eliminated in the semifinals by Juan Martín del Potro and in Miami, he lost surprisingly in the fourth round to Tommy Haas. Djokovic remained in the US and won two singles matches against John Isner and Sam Querrey in the Davis Cup Quarterfinal, clinching the place for Serbia in autumn semifinal against Canada.

Next Djokovic took part in European Clay Court Season, where he played in four tournaments, aiming to capture the 2013 French Open at the end. For the first time in his career he won the Monaco Masters, defeating eight-time defending champion Rafael Nadal in the final. Djokovic was unsuccessful in the following events, losing in second round in Madrid and in the quarterfinals of Rome to Grigor Dimitrov and Berdych respectively. In Roland Garros he missed the opportunity to complete the Career Grand Slam after losing an epic five-set semifinal to Nadal, who eventually won the title.

After a two-week break Novak entered the Wimbledon Championships, where he played much better than in the previous tournaments on clay. He reached the final without dropping a set in the first five matches and won a tight meeting with del Potro, the meeting lasting almost five hours and being the longest semifinal in Wimbledon history. However, two days later Djokovic was not able to threaten Murray despite leading in the second and third set and having saved three championship points. He lost in straight sets, for the first time since 2010.

Novak then started a four-week break and started the North American Hard Court season at the beginning of August, aiming to stay at the top of ATP ranking. At the Rogers Cup, he came attempting to win his third consecutive Canadian Open at the Montreal edition. Although he defeated Gasquet in a rematch of the 2012 final in what he called almost perfect play, he lost a close 7–6 third set tiebreak to nemesis Rafael Nadal in the semis, ending his hard court winning streak against Nadal.

Djokovic reached the quarterfinals at Cincinnati but lost to Isner 7–5 in a third set. Djokovic then lost in the US Open final in four sets to Nadal. Since then Djokovic won Beijing against Nadal in straight sets, Shanghai against del Potro and Paris against Ferrer. At the ATP World Tour Finals, Djokovic retained the trophy, beating Nadal in straight sets.

== All matches ==
This table chronicles all the matches of Djokovic in 2013, including walkovers (W/O) which the ATP does not count as wins. They are marked ND for non-decision or no decision.

Key
W	F	SF	QF	#R	RR	Q#	P#	DNQ	A	Z#	PO	G	S	B	NMS	NTI	P	NH

(W) winner; (F) finalist; (SF) semifinalist; (QF) quarterfinalist; (#R) rounds 4, 3, 2, 1; (RR) round-robin stage; (Q#) qualification round; (P#) preliminary round; (DNQ) did not qualify; (A) absent; (Z#) Davis/Fed Cup Zonal Group (with number indication) or (PO) play-off; (G) gold, (S) silver or (B) bronze Olympic/Paralympic medal; (NMS) not a Masters tournament; (NTI) not a Tier I tournament; (P) postponed; (NH) not held; (SR) strike rate (events won / competed); (W–L) win–loss record.
To avoid confusion and double counting, these charts are updated at the conclusion of a tournament or when the player's participation has ended.

=== Singles matches ===
Tournament	Match	Round	Opponent	Rank	Result	Score
Australian Open; Melbourne, Australia; Grand Slam tournament Hard, outdoor January 14, 2013	1 / 593	1R	(France) Paul-Henri Mathieu	60	Win	6–2, 6–4, 7–5
Australian Open; Melbourne, Australia; Grand Slam tournament Hard, outdoor January 14, 2013	2 / 594	2R	(United States) Ryan Harrison	62	Win	6–1, 6–2, 6–3
Australian Open; Melbourne, Australia; Grand Slam tournament Hard, outdoor January 14, 2013	3 / 595	3R	(Czech Republic) Radek Štěpánek	34	Win	6–4, 6–3, 7–5
Australian Open; Melbourne, Australia; Grand Slam tournament Hard, outdoor January 14, 2013	4 / 596	4R	(Switzerland) Stanislas Wawrinka	17	Win	1–6, 7–5, 6–4, 6–7^{(5–7)}, 12–10
Australian Open; Melbourne, Australia; Grand Slam tournament Hard, outdoor January 14, 2013	5 / 597	QF	(Czech Republic) Tomáš Berdych	6	Win	6–1, 4–6, 6–1, 6–4
Australian Open; Melbourne, Australia; Grand Slam tournament Hard, outdoor January 14, 2013	6 / 598	SF	(Spain) David Ferrer	5	Win	6–2, 6–2, 6–1
Australian Open; Melbourne, Australia; Grand Slam tournament Hard, outdoor January 14, 2013	7 / 599	W	(United Kingdom) Andy Murray	3	Win (1)	6–7^{(2–7)}, 7–6^{(7–3)}, 6–3, 6–2
Davis Cup World Group; 1st round: Belgium vs Serbia; Charleroi, Belgium; Davis Cup; Clay, indoor February 1, 2013	8 / 600	1R; R2	(Belgium) Olivier Rochus	127	Win	6–3, 6–2, 6–2
Dubai Tennis Championships; Dubai, United Arab Emirates; ATP World Tour 500; Hard, outdoor February 25, 2013	9 / 601	1R	(Serbia) Viktor Troicki	44	Win	6–1, 6–4
Dubai Tennis Championships; Dubai, United Arab Emirates; ATP World Tour 500; Hard, outdoor February 25, 2013	10 / 602	2R	(Spain) Roberto Bautista Agut	55	Win	6–1, 7–6^{(7–4)}
Dubai Tennis Championships; Dubai, United Arab Emirates; ATP World Tour 500; Hard, outdoor February 25, 2013	11 / 603	QF	(Italy) Andreas Seppi	20	Win	6–0, 6–3
Dubai Tennis Championships; Dubai, United Arab Emirates; ATP World Tour 500; Hard, outdoor February 25, 2013	12 / 604	SF	(Argentina) Juan Martín del Potro	7	Win	6–3, 7–6^{(7–4)}
Dubai Tennis Championships; Dubai, United Arab Emirates; ATP World Tour 500; Hard, outdoor February 25, 2013	13 / 605	W	(Czech Republic) Tomáš Berdych	6	Win (2)	7–5, 6–3
BNP Paribas Open; Indian Wells, United States; ATP World Tour Masters 1000; Hard, outdoor March 7, 2013		1R	Bye			
BNP Paribas Open; Indian Wells, United States; ATP World Tour Masters 1000; Hard, outdoor March 7, 2013	14 / 606	2R	(Italy) Fabio Fognini	36	Win	6–0, 5–7, 6–2
BNP Paribas Open; Indian Wells, United States; ATP World Tour Masters 1000; Hard, outdoor March 7, 2013	15 / 607	3R	(Bulgaria) Grigor Dimitrov	31	Win	7–6^{(7–4)}, 6–1
BNP Paribas Open; Indian Wells, United States; ATP World Tour Masters 1000; Hard, outdoor March 7, 2013	16 / 608	4R	(United States) Sam Querrey	23	Win	6–0, 7–6^{(8–6)}
BNP Paribas Open; Indian Wells, United States; ATP World Tour Masters 1000; Hard, outdoor March 7, 2013	17 / 609	QF	(France) Jo-Wilfried Tsonga	8	Win	6–3, 6–1
BNP Paribas Open; Indian Wells, United States; ATP World Tour Masters 1000; Hard, outdoor March 7, 2013	18 / 610	SF	(Argentina) Juan Martín del Potro	7	Loss	6–4, 4–6, 4–6
Sony Open Tennis; Miami, United States; ATP World Tour Masters 1000; Hard, outdoor March 20, 2013		1R	Bye			
Sony Open Tennis; Miami, United States; ATP World Tour Masters 1000; Hard, outdoor March 20, 2013	19 / 611	2R	(Czech Republic) Lukáš Rosol	64	Win	6–1, 6–0
Sony Open Tennis; Miami, United States; ATP World Tour Masters 1000; Hard, outdoor March 20, 2013	20 / 612	3R	(India) Somdev Devvarman	254	Win	6–2, 6–4
Sony Open Tennis; Miami, United States; ATP World Tour Masters 1000; Hard, outdoor March 20, 2013	21 / 613	4R	(Germany) Tommy Haas	18	Loss	2–6, 4–6
Davis Cup World Group; Quarterfinals: USA vs Serbia; Boise, United States; Davis Cup; Hard, indoor April 5, 2013	22 / 614	QF; R1	(United States) John Isner	23	Win	7–6^{(7–5)}, 6–2, 7–5
Davis Cup World Group; Quarterfinals: USA vs Serbia; Boise, United States; Davis Cup; Hard, indoor April 5, 2013	23 / 615	QF; R4	(United States) Sam Querrey	20	Win	7–5, 6–7^{(4–7)}, 6–1, 6–0
Monte-Carlo Rolex Masters; Monte Carlo, Monaco; ATP World Tour Masters 1000; Clay, outdoor April 14, 2013		1R	Bye			
Monte-Carlo Rolex Masters; Monte Carlo, Monaco; ATP World Tour Masters 1000; Clay, outdoor April 14, 2013	24 / 616	2R	(Russia) Mikhail Youzhny	27	Win	4–6, 6–1, 6–4
Monte-Carlo Rolex Masters; Monte Carlo, Monaco; ATP World Tour Masters 1000; Clay, outdoor April 14, 2013	25 / 617	3R	(Argentina) Juan Mónaco	20	Win	4–6, 6–2, 6–2
Monte-Carlo Rolex Masters; Monte Carlo, Monaco; ATP World Tour Masters 1000; Clay, outdoor April 14, 2013	26 / 618	QF	(Finland) Jarkko Nieminen	49	Win	6–4, 6–3
Monte-Carlo Rolex Masters; Monte Carlo, Monaco; ATP World Tour Masters 1000; Clay, outdoor April 14, 2013	27 / 619	SF	(Italy) Fabio Fognini	32	Win	6–2, 6–1
Monte-Carlo Rolex Masters; Monte Carlo, Monaco; ATP World Tour Masters 1000; Clay, outdoor April 14, 2013	28 / 620	W	(Spain) Rafael Nadal	5	Win (3)	6–2, 7–6^{(7–1)}
Mutua Madrid Open; Madrid, Spain; ATP World Tour Masters 1000; Clay, outdoor May 5, 2013		1R	Bye			
Mutua Madrid Open; Madrid, Spain; ATP World Tour Masters 1000; Clay, outdoor May 5, 2013	29 / 621	2R	(Bulgaria) Grigor Dimitrov	28	Loss	6–7^{(6–8)}, 7–6^{(10–8)}, 3–6
Internazionali BNL d'Italia; Rome, Italy; ATP World Tour Masters 1000; Clay, outdoor May 12, 2013		1R	Bye			
Internazionali BNL d'Italia; Rome, Italy; ATP World Tour Masters 1000; Clay, outdoor May 12, 2013	30 / 622	2R	(Spain) Albert Montañés	89	Win	6–2, 6–3
Internazionali BNL d'Italia; Rome, Italy; ATP World Tour Masters 1000; Clay, outdoor May 12, 2013	31 / 623	3R	(Ukraine) Alexandr Dolgopolov	23	Win	6–1, 6–4
Internazionali BNL d'Italia; Rome, Italy; ATP World Tour Masters 1000; Clay, outdoor May 12, 2013	32 / 624	QF	(Czech Republic) Tomáš Berdych	6	Loss	6–2, 5–7, 4–6
French Open; Paris, France; Grand Slam tournament Clay, outdoor May 26, 2013	33 / 625	1R	(Belgium) David Goffin	58	Win	7–6^{(7–5)}, 6–4, 7–5
French Open; Paris, France; Grand Slam tournament Clay, outdoor May 26, 2013	34 / 626	2R	(Argentina) Guido Pella	83	Win	6–2, 6–0, 6–2
French Open; Paris, France; Grand Slam tournament Clay, outdoor May 26, 2013	35 / 627	3R	(Bulgaria) Grigor Dimitrov	28	Win	6–2, 6–2, 6–3
French Open; Paris, France; Grand Slam tournament Clay, outdoor May 26, 2013	36 / 628	4R	(Germany) Philipp Kohlschreiber	19	Win	4–6, 6–3, 6–4, 6–4
French Open; Paris, France; Grand Slam tournament Clay, outdoor May 26, 2013	37 / 629	QF	(Germany) Tommy Haas	14	Win	6–3, 7–6^{(7–5)}, 7–5
French Open; Paris, France; Grand Slam tournament Clay, outdoor May 26, 2013	38 / 630	SF	(Spain) Rafael Nadal	4	Loss	4–6, 6–3, 1–6, 7–6^{(7–3)}, 7–9
Wimbledon Championships; London, Great Britain; Grand Slam tournament Grass, outdoor June 24, 2013	39 / 631	1R	(Germany) Florian Mayer	34	Win	6–3, 7–5, 6–4
Wimbledon Championships; London, Great Britain; Grand Slam tournament Grass, outdoor June 24, 2013	40 / 632	2R	(United States) Bobby Reynolds	156	Win	7–6^{(7–2)}, 6–3, 6–1
Wimbledon Championships; London, Great Britain; Grand Slam tournament Grass, outdoor June 24, 2013	41 / 633	3R	(France) Jérémy Chardy	25	Win	6–3, 6–2, 6–2
Wimbledon Championships; London, Great Britain; Grand Slam tournament Grass, outdoor June 24, 2013	42 / 634	4R	(Germany) Tommy Haas	13	Win	6–1, 6–4, 7–6^{(7–4)}
Wimbledon Championships; London, Great Britain; Grand Slam tournament Grass, outdoor June 24, 2013	43 / 635	QF	(Czech Republic) Tomáš Berdych	6	Win	7–6^{(7–5)}, 6–4, 6–3
Wimbledon Championships; London, Great Britain; Grand Slam tournament Grass, outdoor June 24, 2013	44 / 636	SF	(Argentina) Juan Martín del Potro	8	Win	7–5, 4–6, 7–6^{(7–2)}, 6–7^{(6–8)}, 6–3
Wimbledon Championships; London, Great Britain; Grand Slam tournament Grass, outdoor June 24, 2013	45 / 637	F	(United Kingdom) Andy Murray	2	Loss (1)	4–6, 5–7, 4–6
Rogers Cup; Montreal, Canada; ATP World Tour Masters 1000; Hard, outdoor August 5, 2013		1R	Bye			
Rogers Cup; Montreal, Canada; ATP World Tour Masters 1000; Hard, outdoor August 5, 2013	46 / 638	2R	(Germany) Florian Mayer	50	Win	6–2, 6–1
Rogers Cup; Montreal, Canada; ATP World Tour Masters 1000; Hard, outdoor August 5, 2013	47 / 639	3R	(Uzbekistan) Denis Istomin	66	Win	2–6, 6–4, 6–4
Rogers Cup; Montreal, Canada; ATP World Tour Masters 1000; Hard, outdoor August 5, 2013	48 / 640	QF	(France) Richard Gasquet	9	Win	6–1, 6–2
Rogers Cup; Montreal, Canada; ATP World Tour Masters 1000; Hard, outdoor August 5, 2013	49 / 641	SF	(Spain) Rafael Nadal	4	Loss	4–6, 6–3, 6–7^{(2–7)}
Western & Southern Open; Cincinnati, United States; ATP World Tour Masters 1000; Hard, outdoor August 11, 2013		1R	Bye			
Western & Southern Open; Cincinnati, United States; ATP World Tour Masters 1000; Hard, outdoor August 11, 2013	50 / 642	2R	(Argentina) Juan Mónaco	32	Win	7–5, 6–2
Western & Southern Open; Cincinnati, United States; ATP World Tour Masters 1000; Hard, outdoor August 11, 2013	51 / 643	3R	(Belgium) David Goffin	80	Win	6–2, 6–0
Western & Southern Open; Cincinnati, United States; ATP World Tour Masters 1000; Hard, outdoor August 11, 2013	52 / 644	QF	(United States) John Isner	22	Loss	6–7^{(5–7)}, 6–3, 5–7
US Open; New York, United States; Grand Slam tournament Hard, outdoor August 26, 2013	53 / 645	1R	(Lithuania) Ričardas Berankis	112	Win	6–1, 6–2, 6–2
US Open; New York, United States; Grand Slam tournament Hard, outdoor August 26, 2013	54 / 646	2R	(Germany) Benjamin Becker	87	Win	7–6^{(7–2)}, 6–2, 6–2
US Open; New York, United States; Grand Slam tournament Hard, outdoor August 26, 2013	55 / 647	3R	(Portugal) João Sousa	95	Win	6–0, 6–2, 6–2
US Open; New York, United States; Grand Slam tournament Hard, outdoor August 26, 2013	56 / 648	4R	(Spain) Marcel Granollers	43	Win	6–3, 6–0, 6–0
US Open; New York, United States; Grand Slam tournament Hard, outdoor August 26, 2013	57 / 649	QF	(Russia) Mikhail Youzhny	21	Win	6–2, 6–3, 3–6, 6–0
US Open; New York, United States; Grand Slam tournament Hard, outdoor August 26, 2013	58 / 650	SF	(Switzerland) Stanislas Wawrinka	9	Win	2–6, 7–6^{(7–4)}, 3–6, 6–3, 6–4
US Open; New York, United States; Grand Slam tournament Hard, outdoor August 26, 2013	59 / 651	F	(Spain) Rafael Nadal	2	Loss (2)	2–6, 6–3, 4–6, 1–6
Davis Cup World Group; Semifinals: Serbia vs Canada; Belgrade, Serbia; Davis Cup; Clay, indoor September 13, 2013	60 / 652	SF; R1	(Canada) Vasek Pospisil	41	Win	6–2, 6–0, 6–4
Davis Cup World Group; Semifinals: Serbia vs Canada; Belgrade, Serbia; Davis Cup; Clay, indoor September 13, 2013	61 / 653	SF; R4	(Canada) Milos Raonic	11	Win	7–6^{(7–1)}, 6–2, 6–2
China Open; Beijing, China; ATP World Tour 500; Hard, outdoor September 30, 2013	62 / 654	1R	(Czech Republic) Lukáš Rosol	46	Win	6–0, 6–3
China Open; Beijing, China; ATP World Tour 500; Hard, outdoor September 30, 2013	63 / 655	2R	(Spain) Fernando Verdasco	31	Win	7–5, 2–6, 6–2
China Open; Beijing, China; ATP World Tour 500; Hard, outdoor September 30, 2013	64 / 656	QF	(United States) Sam Querrey	30	Win	6–1, 6–2
China Open; Beijing, China; ATP World Tour 500; Hard, outdoor September 30, 2013	65 / 657	SF	(France) Richard Gasquet	10	Win	6–4, 6–2
China Open; Beijing, China; ATP World Tour 500; Hard, outdoor September 30, 2013	66 / 658	W	(Spain) Rafael Nadal	2	Win (4)	6–3, 6–4
Shanghai Rolex Masters; Shanghai, China; ATP World Tour Masters 1000; Hard, outdoor October 6, 2013		1R	Bye			
Shanghai Rolex Masters; Shanghai, China; ATP World Tour Masters 1000; Hard, outdoor October 6, 2013	67 / 659	2R	(Spain) Marcel Granollers	36	Win	6–2, 6–0
Shanghai Rolex Masters; Shanghai, China; ATP World Tour Masters 1000; Hard, outdoor October 6, 2013	68 / 660	3R	(Italy) Fabio Fognini	17	Win	6–3, 6–3
Shanghai Rolex Masters; Shanghai, China; ATP World Tour Masters 1000; Hard, outdoor October 6, 2013	69 / 661	QF	(France) Gaël Monfils	42	Win	6–7^{(4–7)}, 6–2, 6–4
Shanghai Rolex Masters; Shanghai, China; ATP World Tour Masters 1000; Hard, outdoor October 6, 2013	70 / 662	SF	(France) Jo-Wilfried Tsonga	9	Win	6–2, 7–5
Shanghai Rolex Masters; Shanghai, China; ATP World Tour Masters 1000; Hard, outdoor October 6, 2013	71 / 663	W	(Argentina) Juan Martín del Potro	5	Win (5)	6–1, 3–6, 7–6^{(7–3)}
BNP Paribas Masters; Paris, France; ATP World Tour Masters 1000; Hard, indoor October 28, 2013		1R	Bye			
BNP Paribas Masters; Paris, France; ATP World Tour Masters 1000; Hard, indoor October 28, 2013	72 / 664	2R	(France) Pierre-Hugues Herbert	189	Win	7–6^{(7–3)}, 6–3
BNP Paribas Masters; Paris, France; ATP World Tour Masters 1000; Hard, indoor October 28, 2013	73 / 665	3R	(United States) John Isner	16	Win	6–7^{(5–7)}, 6–1, 6–2
BNP Paribas Masters; Paris, France; ATP World Tour Masters 1000; Hard, indoor October 28, 2013	74 / 666	QF	(Switzerland) Stanislas Wawrinka	8	Win	6–1, 6–4
BNP Paribas Masters; Paris, France; ATP World Tour Masters 1000; Hard, indoor October 28, 2013	75 / 667	SF	(Switzerland) Roger Federer	6	Win	4–6, 6–3, 6–2
BNP Paribas Masters; Paris, France; ATP World Tour Masters 1000; Hard, indoor October 28, 2013	76 / 668	W	(Spain) David Ferrer	3	Win (6)	7–5, 7–5
ATP World Tour Finals; London, United Kingdom; ATP World Tour Finals; Hard, indoor November 4, 2013	77 / 669	RR	(Switzerland) Roger Federer	7	Win	6–4, 6–7^{(2–7)}, 6–2
ATP World Tour Finals; London, United Kingdom; ATP World Tour Finals; Hard, indoor November 4, 2013	78 / 670	RR	(Argentina) Juan Martín del Potro	5	Win	6–3, 3–6, 6–3
ATP World Tour Finals; London, United Kingdom; ATP World Tour Finals; Hard, indoor November 4, 2013	79 / 671	RR	(France) Richard Gasquet	9	Win	7–6^{(7–5)}, 4–6, 6–3
ATP World Tour Finals; London, United Kingdom; ATP World Tour Finals; Hard, indoor November 4, 2013	80 / 672	SF	(Switzerland) Stanislas Wawrinka	8	Win	6–3, 6–3
ATP World Tour Finals; London, United Kingdom; ATP World Tour Finals; Hard, indoor November 4, 2013	81 / 673	W	(Spain) Rafael Nadal	1	Win (7)	6–3, 6–4
Davis Cup World Group Final: Serbia vs. Czech Republic; Belgrade, Serbia; Davis Cup; Hard, indoor November 11, 2013	82 / 674	F R1	(Czech Republic) Radek Štěpánek	44	Win	7–5, 6–1, 6–4
Davis Cup World Group Final: Serbia vs. Czech Republic; Belgrade, Serbia; Davis Cup; Hard, indoor November 11, 2013	83 / 675	F R4	(Czech Republic) Tomáš Berdych	7	Win	6–4, 7–6^{(7–5)}, 6–2

- Source

=== Doubles matches ===
Tournament	Match	Round	Opponents	Rank	Team rank	Result	Score
Dubai Tennis Championships; Dubai, United Arab Emirates; ATP World Tour 500; Hard, outdoor February 25, 2013; Partner: (Serbia) Marko Djokovic	1 / 77	1R	(Russia) Nikolay Davydenko (Belgium) Dick Norman	760; 95	–	Loss	6–4, 3–6, [4–10]
China Open; Beijing, China; ATP World Tour 500; Hard, outdoor September 30, 2013; Partner: (Switzerland) Stanislas Wawrinka	2 / 78	1R	(India) Mahesh Bhupathi (Sweden) Robert Lindstedt	10; 17	–	Win	6–3, 6–3
China Open; Beijing, China; ATP World Tour 500; Hard, outdoor September 30, 2013; Partner: (Switzerland) Stanislas Wawrinka	3 / 79	QF	(Germany) Florian Mayer (Germany) Tommy Haas	344; 123	–	Win	6–2, 6–1
China Open; Beijing, China; ATP World Tour 500; Hard, outdoor September 30, 2013; Partner: (Switzerland) Stanislas Wawrinka	-	SF	(Belarus) Max Mirnyi (Romania) Horia Tecău	25; 30	11	W/O	N/A

- Source

=== Hopman Cup ===
Tournament	Round	Match	Opponents	Result	Score
Hopman Cup; Perth, Western Australia, Australia; Mixed Team Event; Hard, outdoor 29 December 2012 – 6 January 2013; Partner: (Serbia) Ana Ivanovic
Hopman Cup; Perth, Western Australia, Australia; Mixed Team Event; Hard, outdoor 29 December 2012 – 6 January 2013; Partner: (Serbia) Ana Ivanovic	RR	Singles	(Italy) Andreas Seppi	Win	6–4, 6–3
Hopman Cup; Perth, Western Australia, Australia; Mixed Team Event; Hard, outdoor 29 December 2012 – 6 January 2013; Partner: (Serbia) Ana Ivanovic	RR	Doubles	(Italy) Francesca Schiavone (Italy) Andreas Seppi	Loss	6–7^{(4–7)}, 4–6
Hopman Cup; Perth, Western Australia, Australia; Mixed Team Event; Hard, outdoor 29 December 2012 – 6 January 2013; Partner: (Serbia) Ana Ivanovic	RR	Singles	(Australia) Bernard Tomic	Loss	4–6, 4–6
Hopman Cup; Perth, Western Australia, Australia; Mixed Team Event; Hard, outdoor 29 December 2012 – 6 January 2013; Partner: (Serbia) Ana Ivanovic	RR	Doubles	(Australia) Ashleigh Barty (Australia) Bernard Tomic	Win	6–4, 6–7^{(8–10)}, [10–6]
Hopman Cup; Perth, Western Australia, Australia; Mixed Team Event; Hard, outdoor 29 December 2012 – 6 January 2013; Partner: (Serbia) Ana Ivanovic	RR	Singles	(Germany) Tommy Haas	Win	6–2, 6–0
Hopman Cup; Perth, Western Australia, Australia; Mixed Team Event; Hard, outdoor 29 December 2012 – 6 January 2013; Partner: (Serbia) Ana Ivanovic	RR	Doubles	(Germany) Tatjana Malek (Australia) Thanasi Kokkinakis (Alt)	Win	6–2, 7–5
Hopman Cup; Perth, Western Australia, Australia; Mixed Team Event; Hard, outdoor 29 December 2012 – 6 January 2013; Partner: (Serbia) Ana Ivanovic	F	Singles	(Spain) Fernando Verdasco	Win	6–3, 7–5
Hopman Cup; Perth, Western Australia, Australia; Mixed Team Event; Hard, outdoor 29 December 2012 – 6 January 2013; Partner: (Serbia) Ana Ivanovic	F	Doubles	(Spain) Anabel Medina Garrigues (Spain) Fernando Verdasco	Loss	4–6, 5–7

=== Exhibitions ===
==== Mubadala World Tennis Championship ====
Tournament	Round	Opponent	Result	Score
Mubadala World Tennis Championship; Abu Dhabi, United Arab Emirates; Exhibition; Hard, outdoor 27–29 December 2012
Mubadala World Tennis Championship; Abu Dhabi, United Arab Emirates; Exhibition; Hard, outdoor 27–29 December 2012	QF	Bye		
Mubadala World Tennis Championship; Abu Dhabi, United Arab Emirates; Exhibition; Hard, outdoor 27–29 December 2012	SF	(Spain) David Ferrer	Win	6–0, 6–3
Mubadala World Tennis Championship; Abu Dhabi, United Arab Emirates; Exhibition; Hard, outdoor 27–29 December 2012	W	(Spain) Nicolás Almagro	Win	6–7^{(4–7)}, 6–3, 6–4

==== Boodles Challenge ====
Tournament	Match	Opponent	Result	Score
Boodles Challenge; Stoke Poges, England, United Kingdom; Exhibition; Grass, outdoor 18–22 June 2013
Boodles Challenge; Stoke Poges, England, United Kingdom; Exhibition; Grass, outdoor 18–22 June 2013	1	(Bulgaria) Grigor Dimitrov	Win	5–7, 6–3, [10–6]

== Tournament schedule ==
=== Singles schedule ===
Date	Tournament	City	Category	Surface	2012 result	2012 points	2013 points	Outcome
14.01.2013–27.01.2013	Australian Open	Melbourne	Grand Slam	Hard	W	2000	2000	Winner (def. Andy Murray, 6–7^{(2–7)}, 7–6^{(7–3)}, 6–3, 6–2)
01.02.2013–03.02.2013	Davis Cup: Belgium vs Serbia	Charleroi	Davis Cup	Clay (i)	DNS	0	40	First round: Serbia def. Belgium 3–2 (def. Olivier Rochus, 6–3, 6–2, 6–2)
25.02.2013–02.03.2013	Dubai Tennis Championships	Dubai	ATP World Tour 500	Hard	SF	180	500	Winner (def. Tomáš Berdych, 7–5, 6–3)
07.03.2013–17.03.2013	BNP Paribas Open	Indian Wells	ATP Masters 1000	Hard	SF	360	360	Semifinals (lost to Juan Martín del Potro, 6–4, 4–6, 4–6)
20.03.2013–31.03.2013	Sony Open Tennis	Miami	ATP Masters 1000	Hard	W	1000	90	Fourth round (lost to Tommy Haas, 2–6, 4–6)
05.04.2013–07.04.2013	Davis Cup: United States vs Serbia	Boise	Davis Cup	Hard (i)	DNS	0	130	Quarterfinals: Serbia def. United States 3–1 (def. John Isner, 7–6^{(7–5)}, 6–2, 7–5) (def. Sam Querrey, 7–5, 6–7^{(4–7)}, 6–1, 6–0)
14.04.2013–21.04.2013	Monte-Carlo Rolex Masters	France	ATP Masters 1000	Clay	F	600	1000	Winner (def. Rafael Nadal, 6–2, 7–6^{(7–1)})
05.05.2013–12.05.2013	Mutua Madrid Open	Madrid	ATP Masters 1000	Clay	QF	180	10	Second round (lost to G Dimitrov, 6–7^{(6–8)}, 7–6^{(10–8)}, 3–6)
12.05.2013–19.05.2013	Internazionali BNL d'Italia	Rome	ATP Masters 1000	Clay	F	600	180	Quarterfinals (lost to Tomáš Berdych, 6–2, 5–7, 4–6)
26.05.2013–09.06.2013	French Open	Paris	Grand Slam	Clay	F	1200	720	Semifinals (lost to R Nadal, 4–6, 6–3, 1–6, 7–6^{(7–3)}, 7–9)
24.06.2013–07.07.2013	Wimbledon Championships	London	Grand Slam	Grass	SF	720	1200	Final (lost to Andy Murray, 4–6, 5–7, 4–6)
29.07.2013–04.08.2013	No Olympic tournament this year				4th	270	N/A	Next Olympics will be held in 2016 in Rio de Janeiro, Brazil
05.08.2013–11.08.2013	Rogers Cup	Montreal	ATP Masters 1000	Hard	W	1000	360	Semifinals (lost to Rafael Nadal, 4–6, 6–3, 6–7^{(2–7)})
11.08.2013–18.08.2013	Western & Southern Open	Cincinnati	ATP Masters 1000	Hard	F	600	180	Quarterfinals (lost to John Isner, 6–7^{(5–7)}, 6–3, 5–7)
26.08.2013–09.09.2013	US Open	New York City	Grand Slam	Hard	F	1200	1200	Final (lost to Rafael Nadal, 2–6, 6–3, 4–6, 1–6)
13.09.2013–15.09.2013	Davis Cup: Serbia vs Canada	Belgrade	Davis Cup	Clay (i)	DNS	0	140	Semifinals: Serbia def. Canada 3–2 (def. Vasek Pospisil, 6–2, 6–0, 6–4) (def. Milos Raonic, 7–6^{(7–1)}, 6–2, 6–2)
30.09.2013–06.10.2013	China Open	Beijing	ATP World Tour 500	Hard	W	500	500	Winner (def. Rafael Nadal, 6–3, 6–4)
06.10.2013–13.10.2013	Shanghai Rolex Masters	Shanghai	ATP Masters 1000	Hard	W	1000	1000	Winner (def. Juan Martín del Potro, 6–1, 3–6, 7–6^{(7–3)})
28.10.2013–03.11.2013	BNP Paribas Masters	Paris	ATP Masters 1000	Hard (i)	2R	10	1000	Winner (def. David Ferrer, 7–5, 7–5)
04.11.2013–11.11.2013	ATP World Tour Finals	London	ATP World Tour Finals	Hard (i)	W	1500	1500	Winner (def. Rafael Nadal, 6–3, 6–4)
15.11.2013–17.11.2013	Davis Cup: Serbia vs Czech Republic	Belgrade	Davis Cup	Hard (i)	DNS	0	150	Final: Serbia lost to Czech Republic 2–3 (def. Radek Štěpánek, 7–5, 6–1, 6–4) (def. Tomáš Berdych, 6–4, 7–6^{(7–5)}, 6–2)
Total year-end points						12920	12260	▼660 difference

- 2012 source
- 2013 source

=== Doubles schedule ===
Date	Tournament	City	Category	Surface	2012 result	2012 points	2013 points	Outcome
25.02.2013–04.03.2013	Dubai Tennis Championships	Dubai	ATP World Tour 500	Hard	DNS	0	(0)	First round (lost to Davydenko/Norman, 6–4, 3–6, [4–10])
07.03.2013–17.03.2013	BNP Paribas Open	Indian Wells	ATP Masters 1000	Hard	1R	(0)	0	Withdrew
30.09.2013–06.10.2013	China Open	Beijing	ATP World Tour 500	Hard	DNS	0	90	Semifinals (withdrew against Mirnyi/Tecău)
Total year-end points						0	90	▲90 difference

- 2012 source
- 2013 source

== Yearly records ==
=== Head-to-head matchups ===
Novak Djokovic has a 24–6 record against players from the top 10, a 34–3 record against other players from the top 50 and 16–0 record against other players outside the top 50.

Ordered by number of wins (Bolded number marks a top 10 player at the time of match, Italic means top 50)

- (Switzerland) **Stanislas Wawrinka** 4–0
- (Czech Republic) **Tomáš Berdych** 4–1
- (Argentina) **Juan Martín del Potro** 4–1
- (France) **Richard Gasquet** 3–0
- (Italy) Fabio Fognini 3–0
- (United States) Sam Querrey 3–0
- (Spain) **Rafael Nadal** 3–3
- (Switzerland) **Roger Federer** 2–0
- (Spain) **David Ferrer** 2–0
- (Belgium) David Goffin 2–0
- (Germany) Florian Mayer 2–0
- (Argentina) Juan Mónaco 2–0
- (Czech Republic) Lukáš Rosol 2–0
- (Czech Republic) Radek Štěpánek 2–0
- (France) **Jo-Wilfried Tsonga** 2–0
- (Russia) Mikhail Youzhny 2–0
- (Bulgaria) Grigor Dimitrov 2–1
- (Germany) Tommy Haas 2–1
- (United States) John Isner 2–1
- (Spain) Roberto Bautista Agut 1–0
- (Germany) Benjamin Becker 1–0
- (Lithuania) Ričardas Berankis 1–0
- (France) Jérémy Chardy 1–0
- (India) Somdev Devvarman 1–0
- (Ukraine) Alexandr Dolgopolov 1–0
- (Spain) Marcel Granollers 2–0
- (United States) Ryan Harrison 1–0
- (France) Pierre-Hugues Herbert 1–0
- (Uzbekistan) Denis Istomin 1–0
- (Germany) Philipp Kohlschreiber 1–0
- (France) Paul-Henri Mathieu 1–0
- (Spain) Albert Montañés 1–0
- (Finland) Jarkko Nieminen 1–0
- (Argentina) Guido Pella 1–0
- (Canada) Vasek Pospisil 1–0
- (Canada) Milos Raonic 1–0
- (United States) Bobby Reynolds 1–0
- (Belgium) Olivier Rochus 1–0
- (Italy) Andreas Seppi 1–0
- (Portugal) João Sousa 1–0
- (Serbia) Viktor Troicki 1–0
- (Spain) Fernando Verdasco 1–0
- (United Kingdom) **Andy Murray** 1–1

=== Finals ===
==== Singles: 9 (7–2) ====
Category
Grand Slam (1–2)
ATP World Tour Finals (1–0)
ATP World Tour Masters 1000 (3–0)
ATP World Tour 500 (2–0)
ATP World Tour 250 (0–0)

Titles by surface
Hard (6–1)
Clay (1–0)
Grass (0–1)

Titles by conditions
Outdoors (5–2)
Indoors (2–0)

Outcome	No.	Date	Tournament	Surface	Opponent in the final	Score in the final
Winner	35.	January 27, 2013	Australian Open, Melbourne (4)	Hard	(United Kingdom) Andy Murray	6–7^{(2–7)}, 7–6^{(7–3)}, 6–3, 6–2
Winner	36.	March 3, 2013	Dubai Tennis Championships, Dubai (4)	Hard	(Czech Republic) Tomáš Berdych	7–5, 6–3
Winner	37.	April 21, 2013	Monte-Carlo Rolex Masters, France (1)	Clay	(Spain) Rafael Nadal	6–2, 7–6^{(7–1)}
Runner-up	20.	July 7, 2013	Wimbledon Championships, London, UK	Grass	(United Kingdom) Andy Murray	4–6, 5–7, 4–6
Runner-up	21.	September 9, 2013	US Open, New York, USA (4)	Hard	(Spain) Rafael Nadal	2–6, 6–3, 4–6, 1–6
Winner	38.	October 6, 2013	China Open, Beijing, China (4)	Hard	(Spain) Rafael Nadal	6–3, 6–4
Winner	39.	October 13, 2013	Shanghai Rolex Masters, China (2)	Hard	(Argentina) Juan Martín del Potro	6–1, 3–6, 7–6^{(7–3)}
Winner	40.	November 3, 2013	BNP Paribas Masters, France (2)	Hard (i)	(Spain) David Ferrer	7–5, 7–5
Winner	41.	November 11, 2013	ATP World Tour Finals, London, UK (3)	Hard (i)	(Spain) Rafael Nadal	6–3, 6–4

==== Team competitions: 2 (0–2) ====
Outcome	No.	Date	Tournament	Surface	Partners	Opponent in the final	Score in the final
Runner-up	2.	January 5, 2013	Hopman Cup, Perth	Hard	(Serbia) Ana Ivanovic	(Spain) Anabel Medina Garrigues (Spain) Fernando Verdasco	1–2
Runner-up	1.	November 15–17, 2013	Davis Cup, Belgrade	Hard (i)	(Serbia) Dušan Lajović (Serbia) Nenad Zimonjić (Serbia) Ilija Bozoljac	(Czech Republic) Tomáš Berdych (Czech Republic) Radek Štěpánek (Czech Republic) Lukáš Rosol (Czech Republic) Jan Hájek	2–3

=== Earnings ===
Event	Prize money	Year-to-date
**Australian Open**	A$2,430,000	$2,559,519
**Dubai Duty Free Tennis Championships**	$432,950	$2,992,469
BNP Paribas Open	$225,000	$3,217,469
Sony Open Tennis	$47,270	$3,264,739
**Monte-Carlo Rolex Masters**	€501,700	$3,922,367
Mutua Madrid Open	€21,935	$3,951,130
Internazionali BNL d'Italia	€62,950	$4,032,877
French Open	€375,000	$4,517,677
Wimbledon Championships	£800,000	$5,750,797
Rogers Cup	$128,960	$5,879,757
Western & Southern Open	$73,255	$5,953,012
US Open	$1,300,000	$7,253,012
**China Open**	$557,100	$7,810,112
**Shanghai Rolex Masters**	$729,725	$8,539,837
**BNP Paribas Masters**	€522,100	$9,061,937
**Barclays ATP World Tour Finals**	$1,923,000	$11,197,947
ATP Bonus Pool	$1,250,000	$12,447,947
		**$12,447,947**

Figures in United States dollars (USD) unless noted.

== See also ==
- 2013 ATP World Tour
- 2013 Roger Federer tennis season
- 2013 Rafael Nadal tennis season
- 2013 Andy Murray tennis season
