= 2013 Andy Murray tennis season =

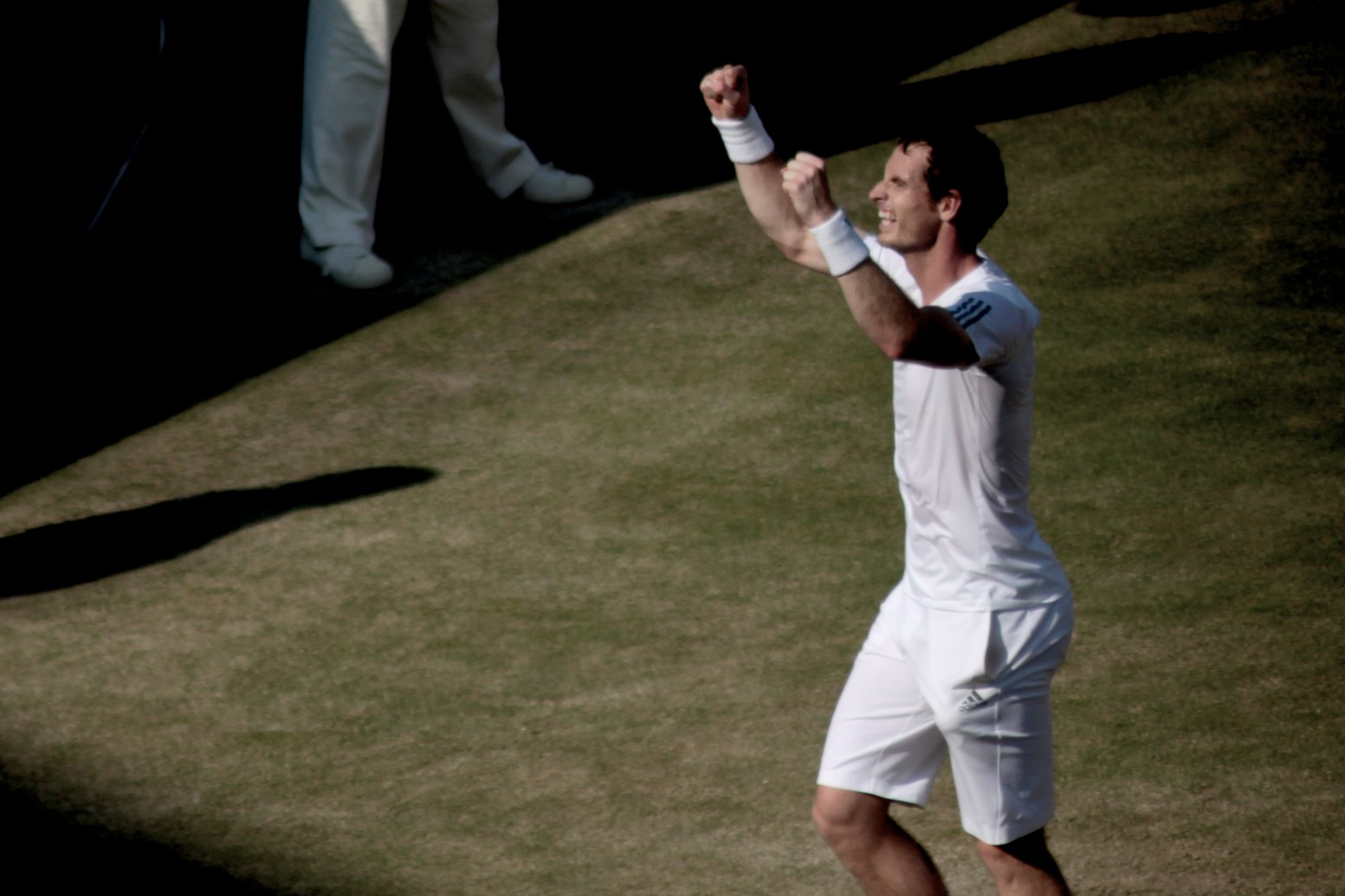
- Andy Murray won his first Wimbledon title in 2013
- Full name: Andy Murray
- Country: (United Kingdom) Great Britain

Singles
- Season record: 43–8 (84.3%)
- Calendar titles: 4
- Year-end ranking: No. 4
- Ranking change from previous year: ▼ -1

Grand Slam & significant results
- Australian Open: F
- French Open: A
- Wimbledon: W
- US Open: QF
- Other tournaments
- Tour Finals: A
- Last updated on: 3 February 2013.

The 2013 Andy Murray tennis season officially began at the Brisbane International where he was the defending champion. He successfully defended that title, defeating Grigor Dimitrov in straight sets in the final. After a quarterfinal showing at Indian Wells, where he lost to Juan Martín del Potro in 3 sets, Murray recovered to win the Miami Masters for the second time, defeating David Ferrer in the final. Winning in Miami meant that Murray overtook Roger Federer as World No. 2, the first time Murray had held the ranking since September 2009, meaning that neither Federer nor Rafael Nadal were ranked in the top 2 for the first time since the end of 2003. During the summer Murray won his first Wimbledon title, defeating Novak Djokovic in the final in straight sets to end Britain's 77-year wait for a home grown men's champion. It was Murray's second major title, and third consecutive title on grass, after winning at the Olympics the previous year, meaning he extended his winning streak on grass to 18 matches. In the summer hard court season, Murray failed to defend his US Open title, losing to Stanislas Wawrinka in the quarterfinals. Following the Davis Cup World Group play-offs, during which Murray won both his singles and the doubles rubber, he ended his season prematurely in order to undergo surgery on a long-standing back problem that had caused him trouble for over a year and a half. He ended the season ranked number 4 in the world, behind Nadal, Djokovic and Ferrer.

== Yearly summary ==
=== Australian Open series ===
==== Brisbane International ====
Murray began his season at the 2013 Brisbane International, where he was the top seed. He defeated Australian John Millman, Denis Istomin of Uzbekistan and Kei Nishikori of Japan (retired) en route to reaching the final for the second consecutive year. Here he faced Bulgarian young gun Grigor Dimitrov, who was competing in his first tour-level final. Despite being broken in the first set, Murray came back to dominate the tiebreak, winning 7 points in a row, then proceeding the second set by 6 games to 4, thus successfully defending his Brisbane title. The victory in Brisbane took Murray's career titles tally to 25, and at the trophy ceremony, Murray dedicated the victory to close friend and Davis Cup teammate Ross Hutchins, who at the time had just been diagnosed with Hodgkin's Lymphoma.

==== Australian Open ====
Murray next competed at the 2013 Australian Open, where he was the No. 3 seed. He made light work of his first two matches, defeating Dutchman Robin Haase and Portugal's João Sousa respectively, each in straight sets, to set up a third round meeting with his practice partner Ričardas Berankis of Lithuania, who had qualified for the tournament the previous week. Despite having his service broken several times, Murray managed to defeat Berankis in straight sets. He next faced French 14th seed Gilles Simon in the fourth round, winning in straight sets and subsequently advancing to the quarter-finals for the ninth straight Grand Slam tournament, and without dropping a set. In the semifinals, Murray met Roger Federer in their first Grand Slam semifinal and fourth Grand Slam meeting overall, their previous three meetings all having come in finals. After exchanging sets over the first four, including Federer taking the second and fourth each in tiebreaks, Murray eventually prevailed in five sets to set up a second consecutive final against Novak Djokovic. In beating Federer, Murray also matched Fred Perry's Grand Slam match win total of 106. In the final against Djokovic, Murray took the first set in a tiebreak, but ultimately lost in four sets, an untimely double fault in the second set proving fatal.

=== Spring American hardcourt season ===
==== Indian Wells ====
Following his final defeat in Melbourne, Murray took a six-week break in order to train for the first two Masters 1000 series tournaments of the year. He entered the 2013 BNP Paribas Open having not won a match since 2010, when he reached the quarterfinals, so had minimum points to defend. After receiving a bye into round two, the Scot faced Russian Evgeny Donskoy, the first meeting between the two. Murray dropped the first set in the 12th game, however then went on to win the next two sets for the loss of just 4 games. He won both of his next two matches in straight sets, against Chinese Taipei's Yen-hsun Lu and Argentine Carlos Berlocq respectively to set up a quarterfinal clash with Juan Martín del Potro. Despite holding a strong advantage in their head-to-head, having won 5 out of 6 meetings, Murray wasn't able to capitalise on winning the opening set in a tiebreaker, losing in three sets to the eventual finalist.

==== Miami Masters ====
Following his defeat in Indian Wells, Murray returned to Miami for the Sony Open Tennis tournament. Murray faced two potentially tricky opponents in young up-and-comers Bernard Tomic of Australia, and Bulgarian Grigor Dimitrov respectively, however overcame both in straight sets. He backed this up with an 84-minute victory over Italian Andreas Seppi, making it to his fourth straight quarterfinal of the year, where he faced Marin Čilić of Croatia. Despite a considerable number of lengthy games and rallies, including nine breaks of serve, one game that lasted over 15 minutes, and seven match points, Murray triumphed in just over an hour and a half in straight sets, to reach the semifinals of the Miami Masters for the fourth time. In the semifinals, Murray faced Frenchman Richard Gasquet, who had beaten fourth seed Tomáš Berdych in the last 8. Murray lost the first set in a tiebreak, despite serving for the set at 5–4, before taking the second and third sets for the loss of just three games. In the final Murray faced Spaniard David Ferrer, the second time the two have met in a final at a Masters 1000 tournament. After losing the first five games of the match, Murray eventually won in three sets, after saving a match point at 6–5 down on serve in the final set, following which he dominated the tiebreak to win his second Miami title, and 9th masters 1000 title overall. Following this victory, Murray moved up to No. 2 in the world rankings for the first time since September 2009, thus marking the first time in almost ten years in which neither Roger Federer or Rafael Nadal was ranked inside the top two.

=== European clay court season ===
Following a two-week break, Murray headed to Monaco for the Monte-Carlo Rolex Masters, where Spaniard Rafael Nadal was 8-time defending champion. After receiving a bye into the second round, Murray won his opening match against qualifier Édouard Roger-Vasselin of France in straight sets, before being defeated by Swiss number 2 Stanislas Wawrinka, who had previously won both of their previous meetings on clay. Due to this, Murray dropped to World No. 3 in the week starting 22 April 2013.

At the Mutua Madrid Open, Murray faced Florian Mayer of Germany in the second round, after a first round bye. Despite facing several set points, the Scot overcame the German number 3 in straight sets to record his 400th career win. He faced Frenchman Gilles Simon in round three, and needed three hours, three sets and 6 match points to record his 11th straight victory over Simon, and reach his first clay court quarterfinal of the year. He will next play against the 2012 runner-up Tomáš Berdych, whom Murray has defeated three times in their past four meetings, however has yet to record a victory over the Czech on clay. Murray will also return to the number 2 ranking after the tournaments conclusion, following a defeat of Roger Federer by Japanese rising star Kei Nishikori in the third round. In the quarter-finals, Murray lost to Tomáš Berdych in straight sets. At the Rome Masters, Murray recovered from a set and a double break down against Marcel Granollers to level the match in a tie-break, only to retire before the start of the third set, citing a back injury. This was the first time Murray had retired mid-match since Hamburg in 2007, when he withdrew from his match against Filippo Volandri during the first set, despite being a double break up.

The back injury he suffered in Rome ultimately forced him to withdraw from the French Open, making this the first Grand Slam tournament since Wimbledon in 2007 that he has missed due to injury. Despite aiming to improve his clay court results, Murray only managed to gain 10 points more than 2012 in the lead up to the French Open, as over-preparation ultimately lead to him aggravating a recurring back injury.

=== Grass court season ===
==== Queen's Club Championships ====
Murray entered the grass court season having won 12 of his previous 13 matches on grass, spanning back to last year's Wimbledon, and having not lost since the final. His first tournament after missing the French Open was at the Queen's Club Championships, where he was the top seed. After receiving a first round bye, Murray's first match in the second round pitted him against Nicolas Mahut, who had knocked him out at the same stage the previous year. Despite not having competed for a month, Murray overcame Mahut in straight sets, which he followed up with straight sets wins over Marinko Matosevic and Benjamin Becker respectively. His first match against a top 10 opponent came in the form of Jo-Wilfried Tsonga, whom Murray had defeated in the final two years previously. He overcame a slow start that saw him lose the first set to win in three, and set up a clash with 5th seed and defending champion Marin Čilić. Once again Murray had to recover from a set down, and went on to defeat Čilić in three sets to win his third Queen's title, becoming the first British man since Arthur Gore to win the tournament three times. The final was followed by a charity doubles match with Tim Henman, fellow top 10 player Tomáš Berdych and former world no. 1 and Murray's coach Ivan Lendl. The match was organised to raise money for the Royal Marsden Cancer Charity, after Murray's Davis Cup teammate and close friend Ross Hutchins was diagnosed with Hodgkins Lymphoma in December 2012.

==== Wimbledon ====
At Wimbledon, Murray made it through his first three matches without losing a set, his first round match, in which he defeated German Benjamin Becker, whom he had defeated at Queen's Club just weeks earlier, took Murray's Grand Slam match wins total to 107, surpassing Fred Perry's total, making Murray the British player with most all time match wins at Grand Slam tournaments. Murray then beat Lu Yen-hsun of Chinese Taipei in round two, and Spanish 32nd seed Tommy Robredo in the third, against whom Murray hadn't played since 2009. In the fourth round match Murray beat Russian Mikhail Youzhny in straight sets despite going 5-2 down in the second set (which, like the previous round, was also the first meeting between the two since 2009). In the quarterfinals, Murray met left-hander Fernando Verdasco of Spain, who had beaten Murray in their previous Grand Slam meeting. Verdasco won the first two sets, before Murray raised his level of play considerably, eventually coming through to win in five sets and reach his fifth consecutive Wimbledon semifinal, tying him with John McEnroe in fourth place for most consecutive semifinals at Wimbledon behind Roger Federer, Jimmy Connors and Björn Borg. Murray faced Jerzy Janowicz of Poland in the semifinals, against whom Murray lost in the 2012 Paris Masters. Despite dropping the opening set in a tiebreak, the Scot eventually prevailed in four to set up a fourth Grand Slam final against Novak Djokovic, the second meeting between the two at SW19, and the first at the Championships. Murray defeated Djokovic in straight sets (6-4, 7–5, 6–4) to become the first British man to win Wimbledon since 1936, the first Scot of either sex to win a Wimbledon singles title since 1896, as well as becoming the 7th man in the open era to complete the Queen's/Wimbledon double. With the win, Murray extended his winning streak on grass to 18 matches, his previous loss coming at the 2012 Wimbledon Final.

=== US Open Series ===
==== Rogers Cup ====
Following a break of around 4 weeks, Murray's next tournament was the Canada Masters held in Montreal. He was aiming to win his third title at the event, second masters 1000 title of the year and 10th masters series title of his career. His first opponent was Spaniard Marcel Granollers, who had won the title in Kitzbühel, whom Murray defeated in straight sets to set up a clash with Ernest Gulbis of Latvia. Despite having lost all 5 of their previous meetings, Gulbis took advantage of Murray's lack of competitive play and defeated the Scot in straight sets, his first loss since he retired at the Rome Masters in May.

In the doubles competition, Murray partnered fellow Scot Colin Fleming, due to the absence of Jonathan Marray from the draw. The pair opened with a victory over Frenchman Julien Benneteau and former world no. 1 Nenad Zimonjić of Serbia. They then went on to defeat three seeded teams, including two former world no. 1's. The pair defeated 2012 Australian Open champions Leander Paes and Radek Štěpánek, fourth seeds Aisam-ul-Haq Qureshi & Jean-Julien Rojer, and 8 time Grand Slam champion Daniel Nestor & three-time Wimbledon finalist Robert Lindstedt to reach their first doubles final at a Masters 1000 tournament. In the final they faced third seeds Alexander Peya & Bruno Soares, however were defeated in straight sets, despite holding two set points in the second set. As a result of his run to the final, Murray will return to the top-100 in doubles for the first time since 2011.

==== Western & Southern Open ====
Murray opened his bid for a third Cincinnati title with two strong wins, defeating Russian Mikhail Youzhny and Julien Benneteau of France each in straight sets, for the loss of just 9 games between them. He then went on to meet Tomáš Berdych in the quarterfinals, however was unable to maintain his level of play against the Czech and went out in straight sets, the second time in a row Murray had lost to Berdych without winning a set.

==== US Open ====
Murray dropped to number 3 in the rankings prior to the US Open, meaning he would potentially have to face both Novak Djokovic and Rafael Nadal in order to defend his title. He was made to wait until the third day of play to begin his title defence, however opened strongly with a straight sets win over Frenchman Michaël Llodra. The next round proved slightly tougher, as Argentine Leonardo Mayer took him to four sets. His next match was against German Florian Mayer, whom he defeated in straight sets, winning the last two comfortably after being taken to a tiebreaker in the first. He faced Denis Istomin of Uzbekistan in the fourth round, who also took Murray to four sets, taking the first in a tiebreak before Murray upped his level and won the next three comfortably to set up a quarterfinal clash with ninth seed Stanislas Wawrinka. In what was anticipated as a tough match, Wawrinka controlled the match throughout, sending a below par Murray out in straight sets. Murray shortly after flew to Croatia to begin preparations for the Davis Cup World Group play-offs on clay.

=== Indoor Season ===
After a disappointing American hardcourt season, Murray took the decision to undergo surgery on his lower back, in the hope of fixing a disc problem that had caused him pain since early 2012. Whilst problems in his lower back seemingly subsided since Wimbledon 2012, Murray revealed that it flared up again during the clay court season, and also caused him discomfort during the US Open Series. As a result, he stated that he would definitely miss the Asian swing of tournaments, pulling out of events in Bangkok, Tokyo and Shanghai, and subsequently from the Paris Masters and the World Tour Finals. It was announced that it was likely he would return to action at the beginning of the 2014 season at the Australian Open.

== All matches ==
This table chronicles all the matches of Murray in 2013, including walkovers (W/O) which the ATP does not count as wins. They are marked ND for non-decision or no decision.

Key
W	F	SF	QF	#R	RR	Q#	P#	DNQ	A	Z#	PO	G	S	B	NMS	NTI	P	NH

(W) winner; (F) finalist; (SF) semifinalist; (QF) quarterfinalist; (#R) rounds 4, 3, 2, 1; (RR) round-robin stage; (Q#) qualification round; (P#) preliminary round; (DNQ) did not qualify; (A) absent; (Z#) Davis/Fed Cup Zonal Group (with number indication) or (PO) play-off; (G) gold, (S) silver or (B) bronze Olympic/Paralympic medal; (NMS) not a Masters tournament; (NTI) not a Tier I tournament; (P) postponed; (NH) not held; (SR) strike rate (events won / competed); (W–L) win–loss record.
To avoid confusion and double counting, these charts are updated at the conclusion of a tournament or when the player's participation has ended.

=== Singles matches ===
Tournament	Match	Round	Opponent (seed or key)	Rank	Result	Score
Brisbane International; Brisbane, Australia; ATP 250; Hard, outdoor 2–7 January 2013
Brisbane International; Brisbane, Australia; ATP 250; Hard, outdoor 2–7 January 2013	–	1R	Bye			
Brisbane International; Brisbane, Australia; ATP 250; Hard, outdoor 2–7 January 2013	1	2R	(Australia) John Millman (Q)	199	Win	6–1, 5–7, 6–3
Brisbane International; Brisbane, Australia; ATP 250; Hard, outdoor 2–7 January 2013	2	QF	(Uzbekistan) Denis Istomin	43	Win	6–4, 7–6^{(7–3)}
Brisbane International; Brisbane, Australia; ATP 250; Hard, outdoor 2–7 January 2013	3	SF	(Japan) Kei Nishikori (5)	19	Win	6–4, 2–0 ret.
Brisbane International; Brisbane, Australia; ATP 250; Hard, outdoor 2–7 January 2013	4	W	(Bulgaria) Grigor Dimitrov	48	Win (1)	7–6^{(7–0)}, 6–4
Australian Open; Melbourne, Australia; Grand Slam tournament Hard, outdoor 14–27 January 2013
Australian Open; Melbourne, Australia; Grand Slam tournament Hard, outdoor 14–27 January 2013	5	1R	(Netherlands) Robin Haase	53	Win	6–3, 6–1, 6–3
Australian Open; Melbourne, Australia; Grand Slam tournament Hard, outdoor 14–27 January 2013	6	2R	(Portugal) João Sousa	100	Win	6–2, 6–2, 6–4
Australian Open; Melbourne, Australia; Grand Slam tournament Hard, outdoor 14–27 January 2013	7	3R	(Lithuania) Ričardas Berankis (Q)	110	Win	6–3, 6–4, 7–5
Australian Open; Melbourne, Australia; Grand Slam tournament Hard, outdoor 14–27 January 2013	8	4R	(France) Gilles Simon (14)	16	Win	6–3, 6–1, 6–3
Australian Open; Melbourne, Australia; Grand Slam tournament Hard, outdoor 14–27 January 2013	9	QF	(France) Jérémy Chardy	36	Win	6–4, 6–1, 6–2
Australian Open; Melbourne, Australia; Grand Slam tournament Hard, outdoor 14–27 January 2013	10	SF	(Switzerland) Roger Federer (2)	2	Win	6–4, 6–7^{(5–7)}, 6–3, 6–7^{(2–7)}, 6–2
Australian Open; Melbourne, Australia; Grand Slam tournament Hard, outdoor 14–27 January 2013	11	F	(Serbia) Novak Djokovic (1)	1	Loss (1)	7–6^{(7–2)}, 6–7^{(3–7)}, 3–6, 2–6
Indian Wells; Indian Wells, United States; ATP 1000; Hard, outdoor 4–17 March 2013
Indian Wells; Indian Wells, United States; ATP 1000; Hard, outdoor 4–17 March 2013	–	1R	Bye			
Indian Wells; Indian Wells, United States; ATP 1000; Hard, outdoor 4–17 March 2013	12	2R	(Russia) Evgeny Donskoy	82	Win	5–7, 6–2, 6–2
Indian Wells; Indian Wells, United States; ATP 1000; Hard, outdoor 4–17 March 2013	13	3R	(Chinese Taipei) Lu Yen-hsun	79	Win	6–3, 6–2
Indian Wells; Indian Wells, United States; ATP 1000; Hard, outdoor 4–17 March 2013	14	4R	(Argentina) Carlos Berlocq	85	Win	7–6^{(7–4)}, 6–4
Indian Wells; Indian Wells, United States; ATP 1000; Hard, outdoor 4–17 March 2013	15	QF	(Argentina) Juan Martín del Potro (7)	7	Loss	7–6^{(7–5)}, 3–6, 1–6
Miami Open; Miami, United States; ATP 1000; Hard, outdoor 18–31 March 2013
Miami Open; Miami, United States; ATP 1000; Hard, outdoor 18–31 March 2013	–	1R	Bye			
Miami Open; Miami, United States; ATP 1000; Hard, outdoor 18–31 March 2013	16	2R	(Australia) Bernard Tomic	43	Win	6–3, 6–1
Miami Open; Miami, United States; ATP 1000; Hard, outdoor 18–31 March 2013	17	3R	(Bulgaria) Grigor Dimitrov (29)	32	Win	7–6^{(7–3)}, 6–3
Miami Open; Miami, United States; ATP 1000; Hard, outdoor 18–31 March 2013	18	4R	(Italy) Andreas Seppi (16)	19	Win	6–2, 6–4
Miami Open; Miami, United States; ATP 1000; Hard, outdoor 18–31 March 2013	19	QF	(Croatia) Marin Čilić (9)	11	Win	6–4, 6–3
Miami Open; Miami, United States; ATP 1000; Hard, outdoor 18–31 March 2013	20	SF	(France) Richard Gasquet (8)	10	Win	6–7^{(3–7)}, 6–1, 6–2
Miami Open; Miami, United States; ATP 1000; Hard, outdoor 18–31 March 2013	21	W	(Spain) David Ferrer (3)	5	Win (2)	2–6, 6–4, 7–6^{(7–1)}
Monte-Carlo Masters; Monte Carlo, Monaco; ATP 1000; Clay, outdoor 15–21 April 2013
Monte-Carlo Masters; Monte Carlo, Monaco; ATP 1000; Clay, outdoor 15–21 April 2013	–	1R	Bye			
Monte-Carlo Masters; Monte Carlo, Monaco; ATP 1000; Clay, outdoor 15–21 April 2013	22	2R	(France) Édouard Roger-Vasselin (Q)	78	Win	6–1, 6–4
Monte-Carlo Masters; Monte Carlo, Monaco; ATP 1000; Clay, outdoor 15–21 April 2013	23	3R	(Switzerland) Stan Wawrinka (13)	17	Loss	1–6, 2–6
Madrid Open; Madrid, Spain; ATP 1000; Clay, outdoor 6–12 May 2013
Madrid Open; Madrid, Spain; ATP 1000; Clay, outdoor 6–12 May 2013	–	1R	Bye			
Madrid Open; Madrid, Spain; ATP 1000; Clay, outdoor 6–12 May 2013	24	2R	(Germany) Florian Mayer	26	Win	7–6^{(13–11)}, 7–6^{(7–3)}
Madrid Open; Madrid, Spain; ATP 1000; Clay, outdoor 6–12 May 2013	25	3R	(France) Gilles Simon (16)	17	Win	2–6, 6–4, 7–6^{(8–6)}
Madrid Open; Madrid, Spain; ATP 1000; Clay, outdoor 6–12 May 2013	26	QF	(Czech Republic) Tomáš Berdych (6)	6	Loss	6–7^{(3–7)}, 4–6
Italian Open; Rome, Italy; ATP 1000; Clay, outdoor 13–19 May 2013
Italian Open; Rome, Italy; ATP 1000; Clay, outdoor 13–19 May 2013	–	1R	Bye			
Italian Open; Rome, Italy; ATP 1000; Clay, outdoor 13–19 May 2013	27	2R	(Spain) Marcel Granollers	37	Loss	2–6, 7–6^{(7–5)}, 0–0 ret.
Queen's Club Championships; London, United Kingdom; ATP 250; Grass, outdoor 10–16 June 2013
Queen's Club Championships; London, United Kingdom; ATP 250; Grass, outdoor 10–16 June 2013	–	1R	Bye			
Queen's Club Championships; London, United Kingdom; ATP 250; Grass, outdoor 10–16 June 2013	28	2R	(France) Nicolas Mahut	224	Win	6–3, 7–6^{(7–4)}
Queen's Club Championships; London, United Kingdom; ATP 250; Grass, outdoor 10–16 June 2013	29	3R	(Australia) Marinko Matosevic	65	Win	6–2, 6–2
Queen's Club Championships; London, United Kingdom; ATP 250; Grass, outdoor 10–16 June 2013	30	QF	(Germany) Benjamin Becker	85	Win	6–4, 7–6^{(7–3)}
Queen's Club Championships; London, United Kingdom; ATP 250; Grass, outdoor 10–16 June 2013	31	SF	(France) Jo-Wilfried Tsonga (4)	7	Win	4–6, 6–3, 6–2
Queen's Club Championships; London, United Kingdom; ATP 250; Grass, outdoor 10–16 June 2013	32	W	(Croatia) Marin Čilić (5)	12	Win (3)	5–7, 7–5, 6–3
Wimbledon Championships; London, United Kingdom; Grand Slam tournament Grass, outdoor 24 June – 7 July 2013
Wimbledon Championships; London, United Kingdom; Grand Slam tournament Grass, outdoor 24 June – 7 July 2013	33	1R	(Germany) Benjamin Becker	95	Win	6–4, 6–3, 6–2
Wimbledon Championships; London, United Kingdom; Grand Slam tournament Grass, outdoor 24 June – 7 July 2013	34	2R	(Chinese Taipei) Lu Yen-hsun	75	Win	6–3, 6–3, 7–5
Wimbledon Championships; London, United Kingdom; Grand Slam tournament Grass, outdoor 24 June – 7 July 2013	35	3R	(Spain) Tommy Robredo (32)	29	Win	6–2, 6–4, 7–5
Wimbledon Championships; London, United Kingdom; Grand Slam tournament Grass, outdoor 24 June – 7 July 2013	36	4R	(Russia) Mikhail Youzhny (20)	26	Win	6–4, 7–6^{(7–5)}, 6–1
Wimbledon Championships; London, United Kingdom; Grand Slam tournament Grass, outdoor 24 June – 7 July 2013	37	QF	(Spain) Fernando Verdasco	54	Win	4–6, 3–6, 6–1, 6–4, 7–5
Wimbledon Championships; London, United Kingdom; Grand Slam tournament Grass, outdoor 24 June – 7 July 2013	38	SF	(Poland) Jerzy Janowicz (24)	22	Win	6–7^{(2–7)}, 6–4, 6–4, 6–3
Wimbledon Championships; London, United Kingdom; Grand Slam tournament Grass, outdoor 24 June – 7 July 2013	39	W	(Serbia) Novak Djokovic (1)	1	Win (4)	6–4, 7–5, 6–4
Canadian Open; Montreal, Canada; ATP 1000; Hard, outdoor 5–11 August 2013
Canadian Open; Montreal, Canada; ATP 1000; Hard, outdoor 5–11 August 2013	–	1R	Bye			
Canadian Open; Montreal, Canada; ATP 1000; Hard, outdoor 5–11 August 2013	40	2R	(Spain) Marcel Granollers	95	Win	6–4, 7–6^{(7–2)}
Canadian Open; Montreal, Canada; ATP 1000; Hard, outdoor 5–11 August 2013	41	3R	(Latvia) Ernests Gulbis	38	Loss	4–6, 3–6
Cincinnati Masters; Cincinnati, United States; ATP 1000; Hard, outdoor 12–19 August 2013
Cincinnati Masters; Cincinnati, United States; ATP 1000; Hard, outdoor 12–19 August 2013	–	1R	Bye			
Cincinnati Masters; Cincinnati, United States; ATP 1000; Hard, outdoor 12–19 August 2013	42	2R	(Russia) Mikhail Youzhny	25	Win	6–2, 6–3
Cincinnati Masters; Cincinnati, United States; ATP 1000; Hard, outdoor 12–19 August 2013	43	3R	(France) Julien Benneteau	36	Win	6–2, 6–2
Cincinnati Masters; Cincinnati, United States; ATP 1000; Hard, outdoor 12–19 August 2013	44	QF	(Czech Republic) Tomáš Berdych (6)	6	Loss	3–6, 4–6
US Open; New York City, United States; Grand Slam tournament Hard, outdoor 26 August – 9 September 2013
US Open; New York City, United States; Grand Slam tournament Hard, outdoor 26 August – 9 September 2013	45	1R	(France) Michaël Llodra	49	Win	6–4, 6–2, 6–3
US Open; New York City, United States; Grand Slam tournament Hard, outdoor 26 August – 9 September 2013	46	2R	(Argentina) Leonardo Mayer	81	Win	7–5, 6–1, 3–6, 6–1
US Open; New York City, United States; Grand Slam tournament Hard, outdoor 26 August – 9 September 2013	47	3R	(Germany) Florian Mayer	47	Win	7–6^{(7–2)}, 6–2, 6–2
US Open; New York City, United States; Grand Slam tournament Hard, outdoor 26 August – 9 September 2013	48	4R	(Uzbekistan) Denis Istomin	65	Win	6–7^{(5–7)}, 6–1, 6–4, 6–4
US Open; New York City, United States; Grand Slam tournament Hard, outdoor 26 August – 9 September 2013	49	QF	(Switzerland) Stan Wawrinka (9)	10	Loss	4–6, 3–6, 2–6
Davis Cup World Group play-offs Umag, Croatia; Davis Cup; Clay, outdoor 13–15 September 2013
Davis Cup World Group play-offs Umag, Croatia; Davis Cup; Clay, outdoor 13–15 September 2013	50	PO; R1	(Croatia) Borna Ćorić	525	Win	6–3, 6–0, 6–3
Davis Cup World Group play-offs Umag, Croatia; Davis Cup; Clay, outdoor 13–15 September 2013	51	PO; R4	(Croatia) Ivan Dodig	35	Win	6–4, 6–2, 6–4

=== Doubles matches ===
Tournament	Match	Round	Opponent (seed or key)	Rank	Result	Score
Indian Wells; Indian Wells, United States; ATP 1000; Hard, outdoor 4–17 March 2013; Partner: (United Kingdom) Jamie Murray
Indian Wells; Indian Wells, United States; ATP 1000; Hard, outdoor 4–17 March 2013; Partner: (United Kingdom) Jamie Murray	1	1R	(Sweden) Lindstedt / (Serbia) Zimonjić (5)	7 / 20	Win	6–4, 4–6, [10–4]
Indian Wells; Indian Wells, United States; ATP 1000; Hard, outdoor 4–17 March 2013; Partner: (United Kingdom) Jamie Murray	2	2R	(Philippines) Huey / (Poland) Janowicz	36 / 136	Loss	3–6, 5–7
Canadian Open; Montreal, Canada; ATP 1000; Hard, outdoor 5–11 August 2013; Partner: (United Kingdom) Colin Fleming
Canadian Open; Montreal, Canada; ATP 1000; Hard, outdoor 5–11 August 2013; Partner: (United Kingdom) Colin Fleming	3	1R	(France) Benneteau / (Serbia) Zimonjić	19 / 12	Win	1–6, 6–4, [10–6]
Canadian Open; Montreal, Canada; ATP 1000; Hard, outdoor 5–11 August 2013; Partner: (United Kingdom) Colin Fleming	4	2R	(India) Paes / (Czech Republic) Štěpánek (4)	10 / 9	Win	6–3, 6–3
Canadian Open; Montreal, Canada; ATP 1000; Hard, outdoor 5–11 August 2013; Partner: (United Kingdom) Colin Fleming	5	QF	(Pakistan) Qureshi / (Netherlands) Rojer (5)	13 / 14	Win	6–3, 7–6^{(7–3)}
Canadian Open; Montreal, Canada; ATP 1000; Hard, outdoor 5–11 August 2013; Partner: (United Kingdom) Colin Fleming	6	SF	(Sweden) Lindstedt / (Canada) Nestor (6)	11 / 18	Win	6–3, 6–0
Canadian Open; Montreal, Canada; ATP 1000; Hard, outdoor 5–11 August 2013; Partner: (United Kingdom) Colin Fleming	7	F	(Austria) Peya / (Brazil) Soares (3)	6 / 8	Loss (1)	4–6, 6–7^{(4–7)}
Davis Cup World Group play-offs Umag, Croatia; Davis Cup; Clay, outdoor 13–15 September 2013; Partner: (United Kingdom) Colin Fleming
Davis Cup World Group play-offs Umag, Croatia; Davis Cup; Clay, outdoor 13–15 September 2013; Partner: (United Kingdom) Colin Fleming	8	PO; R3	(Croatia) Dodig / (Croatia) Pavić	23 / 89	Win	6–4, 6–3, 6–7^{(6–8)}, 6–1

== Tournament schedule ==
=== Singles Schedule ===
Date	Championship	Location	Category	Surface	Prev. result	Prev. points	New points	Outcome
30 December 2012– 6 January 2013	Brisbane International	Brisbane (AUS)	ATP World Tour 250	Hard	W	250	250	Won in the final against Grigor Dimitrov
14 January 2013– 27 January 2013	Australian Open	Melbourne (AUS)	Grand Slam tournament	Hard	SF	720	1,200	Lost in the final against Novak Djokovic
4 March 2013– 17 March 2013	Indian Wells Masters	Indian Wells (USA)	ATP World Tour Masters 1000	Hard	2R	10	180	Lost in the quarterfinals against Juan Martín del Potro
18 March 2013– 31 March 2013	Miami Masters	Miami (USA)	ATP World Tour Masters 1000	Hard	F	600	1,000	Won in the final against David Ferrer
15 April 2013– 22 April 2013	Monte-Carlo Masters	Monte-Carlo (MON)	ATP World Tour Masters 1000	Clay	QF	180	90	Lost in the third round against Stanislas Wawrinka
6 May 2013– 12 May 2013	Mutua Madrid Open	Madrid (ESP)	ATP World Tour Masters 1000	Clay	A	0	180	Lost in the quarterfinals against Tomáš Berdych
13 May 2013– 19 May 2013	Internazionali BNL d'Italia	Rome (ITA)	ATP World Tour Masters 1000	Clay	3R	90	10	Retired in the second round against Marcel Granollers
26 May 2013– 9 June 2013	French Open	Paris (FRA)	Grand Slam tournament	Clay	QF	360	0	Withdrew due to injury
10 June 2013– 16 June 2013	Aegon Championships	London (GBR)	ATP World Tour 250	Grass	2R	0	250	Won in the final against Marin Čilić
23 June 2013– 7 July 2013	Wimbledon	London (GBR)	Grand Slam tournament	Grass	F	1,200	2,000	Won in the final against Novak Djokovic
29 July 2013– 4 August 2013	No Olympic tournament this year				W	750	0	Next Olympics will be held in 2016 in Rio de Janeiro, Brazil
5 August 2013– 11 August 2013	Rogers Cup	Montreal (CAN)	ATP World Tour Masters 1000	Hard	3R	90	90	Lost in the third round against Ernests Gulbis
12 August 2013– 18 August 2013	Western & Southern Open	Cincinnati (USA)	ATP World Tour Masters 1000	Hard	3R	90	180	Lost in the quarterfinals against Tomáš Berdych
26 August 2013– 9 September 2013	US Open	New York (USA)	Grand Slam tournament	Hard	W	2,000	360	Lost in the quarterfinals against Stanislas Wawrinka
13 September– 15 September 2013	Davis Cup: Croatia vs. Great Britain	Umag (CRO)	Davis Cup	Clay	DNS	0	15	WG Play-offs: (United Kingdom) Great Britain def. Croatia (def. Borna Ćorić, 6–3, 6–0, 6–3) (def. Ivan Dodig, 6–4, 6–2, 6–4)
23 September– 29 September 2013	PTT Thailand Open	Bangkok (THA)	ATP World Tour 250	Hard (i)	DNS	0	0	Withdrew due to injury
30 September– 6 October 2013	Rakuten Japan Open Tennis Championships	Tokyo (JPN)	ATP World Tour 500	Hard	SF	180	0	Withdrew due to injury
7 October 2013– 13 October 2013	Shanghai Masters	Shanghai (CHN)	ATP World Tour Masters 1000	Hard	F	600	0	Withdrew due to injury
28 October 2013– 3 November 2013	Paris Masters	Paris (FRA)	ATP World Tour Masters 1000	Hard (i)	3R	90	0	Withdrew due to injury
4 November 2013– 10 November 2013	ATP World Tour Finals	London (GBR)	ATP World Tour Finals	Hard (i)	SF	400	0	Withdrew due to injury
Total year-end points						8000	7075	▼ -925 difference

- 2012 source
- 2013 source

== Yearly Records ==
=== Head-to-head matchups ===
Ordered by number of wins (Bold denotes a top 10 player at the time of match, Italic means top 50)

- (Germany) Benjamin Becker 2–0
- (Croatia) Marin Čilić 2–0
- (Bulgaria) Grigor Dimitrov 2–0
- (Uzbekistan) Denis Istomin 2–0
- (Germany) Florian Mayer 2–0
- (France) Gilles Simon 2–0
- (Chinese Taipei) Lu Yen-hsun 2–0
- (Russia) Mikhail Youzhny 2–0
- (France) Julien Benneteau 1–0
- (Lithuania) Ričardas Berankis 1–0
- (Argentina) Carlos Berlocq 1–0
- (France) Jérémy Chardy 1–0
- (Croatia) Borna Ćorić 1–0
- (Croatia) Ivan Dodig 1–0
- (Russia) Evgeny Donskoy 1–0
- (Switzerland) **Roger Federer** 1–0
- (Spain) **David Ferrer** 1–0
- (France) **Richard Gasquet** 1–0
- (Netherlands) Robin Haase 1–0
- (Poland) Jerzy Janowicz 1–0
- (France) Michaël Llodra 1–0
- (France) Nicolas Mahut 1–0
- (Australia) Marinko Matosevic 1–0
- (Argentina) Leonardo Mayer 1–0
- (Australia) John Millman 1–0
- (Japan) Kei Nishikori 1–0
- (Spain) Tommy Robredo 1–0
- (France) Édouard Roger-Vasselin 1–0
- (Italy) Andreas Seppi 1–0
- (Portugal) João Sousa 1–0
- (Australia) Bernard Tomic 1–0
- (France) **Jo-Wilfried Tsonga** 1–0
- (Spain) Fernando Verdasco 1–0
- (Serbia) **Novak Djokovic** 1–1
- (Spain) Marcel Granollers 1–1
- (Argentina) **Juan Martín del Potro** 0–1
- (Latvia) Ernest Gulbis 0–1
- (Czech Republic) **Tomáš Berdych** 0–2
- (Switzerland) Stanislas Wawrinka 0–2

=== Finals ===
==== Singles: 5 (4–1) ====
Category Grand Slam (1–1) ATP World Tour Finals (0–0) ATP World Tour Masters 1000 (1–0) ATP World Tour 500 (0–0) ATP World Tour 250 (2–0)	Titles by surface Hard (2–1) Clay (0–0) Grass (2–0)	Titles by conditions Outdoors (4–1) Indoors (0–0)

Outcome	No.	Date	Championship	Surface	Opponent in the final	Score in the final
Winner	25.	January 6, 2013	Brisbane International, Brisbane, Australia (2)	Hard	(Bulgaria) Grigor Dimitrov	7–6^{(7–1)}, 6–4
Runner-up	14.	January 27, 2013	Australian Open, Melbourne, Australia (3)	Hard	(Serbia) Novak Djokovic	7–6^{(7–2)}, 6–7^{(3–7)}, 3–6, 2–6
Winner	26.	March 31, 2013	Sony Open Tennis, Miami, USA (2)	Hard	(Spain) David Ferrer	2–6, 6–4, 7–6^{(7–1)}
Winner	27.	June 16, 2013	Aegon Championships, London, United Kingdom (3)	Grass	(Croatia) Marin Čilić	5–7, 7–5, 6–3
Winner	28.	July 7, 2013	The Championships, Wimbledon, London, UK	Grass	(Serbia) Novak Djokovic	6–4, 7–5, 6–4

==== Doubles: 1 (0–1) ====
Category ATP World Tour Masters 1000 (0–1)	Titles by surface Hard (0–1)	Titles by setting Outdoors (0–1)

Outcome	No.	Date	Championship	Surface	Partner	Opponents in the final	Score in the final
Runner-up	2.	August 11, 2013	Rogers Cup, Montreal, Canada	Hard	(United Kingdom) Colin Fleming	(Austria) Alexander Peya (Brazil) Bruno Soares	4–6, 6–7^{(4–7)}

=== Earnings ===
- **Bold** font denotes tournament win

#	Venue	Singles Prize Money	Year-to-date
1.	**Brisbane International**	**$78,800**	**$78,800**
2.	Australian Open	A$1,215,000	$1,343,858
3.	BNP Paribas Open	$104,000	$1,447,858
4.	**Sony Open Tennis**	**$719,160**	**$2,167,018**
5.	Monte-Carlo Rolex Masters	€32,700	$2,209,730
6.	Mutua Madrid Open	€80,102	$2,329,644
7.	Internazionali BNL d'Italia	€17,235	$2,352,697
8.	**Queen's Club Championships**	**€84,766**	**$2,466,090**
9.	**Wimbledon Championships**	**£1,600,000**	**$4,850,090**
10.	Rogers Cup	$35,660	$4,885,750
11.	Western & Southern Open	$73,255	$4,959,005
12.	US Open	$325,000	$5,284,005
As of September 9, 2013

== See also ==
- 2013 Roger Federer tennis season
- 2013 Rafael Nadal tennis season
- 2013 Novak Djokovic tennis season
- 2013 ATP World Tour
