= 2013 Monte-Carlo Rolex Masters – Doubles =

Doubles
- 2013 Monte-Carlo Rolex Masters

Final
- Champions: (France) Julien Benneteau (Serbia) Nenad Zimonjić
- Runners-up: (United States) Bob Bryan (United States) Mike Bryan
- Score: 4–6, 7–6^{(7–4)}, [14–12]

Events
Singles	Doubles
← 2012 ·	Monte-Carlo Rolex Masters	· 2014 →

Bob and Mike Bryan were the two-time defending champions but lost in the final to Julien Benneteau and Nenad Zimonjić 6–4, 6–7^{(4–7)}, [12–14].

== Seeds ==
All seeds received a bye into the second round.

1. (United States) Bob Bryan / (United States) Mike Bryan (final)
2. (Spain) Marcel Granollers / (Spain) Marc López (second round)
3. (Sweden) Robert Lindstedt / (Canada) Daniel Nestor (quarterfinals)
4. (Pakistan) Aisam-ul-Haq Qureshi / (Netherlands) Jean-Julien Rojer (quarterfinals)
5. (Belarus) Max Mirnyi / (Romania) Horia Tecău (quarterfinals)
6. (India) Mahesh Bhupathi / (India) Rohan Bopanna (second round)
7. (Austria) Alexander Peya / (Brazil) Bruno Soares (second round)
8. (Poland) Mariusz Fyrstenberg / (Poland) Marcin Matkowski (second round)

== Draw ==
=== Key ===
- Q = Qualifier
- WC = Wild card
- LL = Lucky loser
- Alt = Alternate
- SE = Special exempt
- PR = Protected ranking
- ITF = ITF entry
- JE = Junior exempt
- w/o = Walkover
- r = Retired
- d = Defaulted
- SR = Special ranking

=== Finals ===
Semifinals
1	(United States) Bob Bryan (United States) Mike Bryan	6	6
(Canada) Milos Raonic (Australia) Bernard Tomic	3	3
(France) Julien Benneteau (Serbia) Nenad Zimonjić	6	6
(Spain) David Marrero (Spain) Fernando Verdasco	4	3

Final
1	(United States) Bob Bryan (United States) Mike Bryan	6	6^{4}	[12]
(France) Julien Benneteau (Serbia) Nenad Zimonjić	4	7^{7}	[14]

=== Top half ===
First round
(Germany) P Kohlschreiber (Germany) F Mayer	6	7
(Philippines) TC Huey (Poland) J Janowicz	1	6^{5}
WC	(Monaco) B Balleret (Monaco) G Couillard	3	5
(Austria) J Melzer (India) L Paes	6	7
(France) G Simon (Russia) M Youzhny	6^{4}	6	[10]
(Poland) Ł Kubot (Serbia) J Tipsarević	7	3	[7]
(Croatia) M Čilić (Brazil) M Melo	4	7	[9]
(Canada) M Raonic (Australia) B Tomic	6	6^{3}	[11]

Second round
1	(United States) B Bryan (United States) M Bryan	6	6
(Germany) P Kohlschreiber (Germany) F Mayer	3	2
(Austria) J Melzer (India) L Paes	6	6
6	(India) M Bhupathi (India) R Bopanna	2	3
3	(Sweden) R Lindstedt (Canada) D Nestor	6	6
(France) G Simon (Russia) M Youzhny	4	0
(Canada) M Raonic (Australia) B Tomic	6	6
8	(Poland) M Fyrstenberg (Poland) M Matkowski	2	4

Quarterfinals
1	(United States) B Bryan (United States) M Bryan	4	6	[10]
(Austria) J Melzer (India) L Paes	6	3	[5]
3	(Sweden) R Lindstedt (Canada) D Nestor	6^{7}	3
(Canada) M Raonic (Australia) B Tomic	7^{9}	6

Semifinals
1	(United States) B Bryan (United States) M Bryan	6	6
(Canada) M Raonic (Australia) B Tomic	3	3

=== Bottom half ===
First round
(France) J Benneteau (Serbia) N Zimonjić	7^{7}	6
(Italy) D Bracciali (Italy) A Seppi	6^{5}	2
(United Kingdom) C Fleming (United Kingdom) J Marray	6	7^{9}
(Austria) J Knowle (Denmark) F Nielsen	4	6^{7}
(Croatia) I Dodig (Czech Republic) R Štěpánek	6	6
(France) B Paire (Switzerland) S Wawrinka	4	3
WC	(Italy) F Fognini (France) N Mahut	6	2	[5]
(Spain) D Marrero (Spain) F Verdasco	2	6	[10]

Second round
7	(Austria) A Peya (Brazil) B Soares	6^{7}	4
(France) J Benneteau (Serbia) N Zimonjić	7^{9}	6
(United Kingdom) C Fleming (United Kingdom) J Marray	4	1
4	(Pakistan) A-u-H Qureshi (Netherlands) J-J Rojer	6	6
5	(Belarus) M Mirnyi (Romania) H Tecău	6	6
(Croatia) I Dodig (Czech Republic) R Štěpánek	2	2
(Spain) D Marrero (Spain) F Verdasco	4	6	[10]
2	(Spain) M Granollers (Spain) M López	6	2	[4]

Quarterfinals
(France) J Benneteau (Serbia) N Zimonjić	6	7
4	(Pakistan) A-u-H Qureshi (Netherlands) J-J Rojer	2	5
5	(Belarus) M Mirnyi (Romania) H Tecău	4	2
(Spain) D Marrero (Spain) F Verdasco	6	6

Semifinals
(France) J Benneteau (Serbia) N Zimonjić	6	6
(Spain) D Marrero (Spain) F Verdasco	4	3
