= 2013 Gerry Weber Open =

- Date: 8–16 June
- Edition: 21st
- Category: ATP World Tour 250
- Draw: 28S / 16D
- Prize money: €683,665
- Surface: Grass
- Location: Halle, Germany
- Venue: Gerry Weber Stadion

Champions

Singles
- (Switzerland) Roger Federer

Doubles
- (Mexico) Santiago González / (United States) Scott Lipsky
← 2012 ·	Gerry Weber Open	· 2014 →

The 2013 Gerry Weber Open was a men's tennis tournament played on outdoor grass courts. It was the 21st edition of the event known that year as the Gerry Weber Open and was part of the ATP World Tour 250 series of the 2013 ATP World Tour. It took place at the Gerry Weber Stadion in Halle, Germany, between 8 June and 16 June 2013. First-seeded Roger Federer won his sixth singles title at the event..

== Singles main-draw entrants ==
=== Seeds ===
Country	Player	Rank^{1}	Seed
SUI	Roger Federer	3	1
FRA	Richard Gasquet	9	2
GER	Tommy Haas	14	3
JPN	Kei Nishikori	15	4
CAN	Milos Raonic	16	5
GER	Philipp Kohlschreiber	19	6
POL	Jerzy Janowicz	23	7
GER	Florian Mayer	30	8

- ^{1} Rankings are as of May 27, 2013.

=== Other entrants ===
The following players received wildcards into the singles main draw:

- (Germany) Cedrik-Marcel Stebe
- (Germany) Jan-Lennard Struff
- (Germany) Mischa Zverev

The following players received entry from the qualifying draw:

- (Austria) Martin Fischer
- (Italy) Riccardo Ghedin
- (Czech Republic) Jan Hernych
- (Chinese Taipei) Jimmy Wang

The following player received entry as a lucky loser:

- (Bosnia and Herzegovina) Mirza Bašić

=== Withdrawals ===
Before the tournament

- (Italy) Paolo Lorenzi
- (Spain) Rafael Nadal (fatigue)
- (Germany) Philipp Petzschner (right shoulder injury)
- (Italy) Andreas Seppi
- (Serbia) Janko Tipsarević

== Doubles main-draw entrants ==
=== Seeds ===
Country	Player	Country	Player	Rank^{1}	Seed
PAK	Aisam-ul-Haq Qureshi	NED	Jean-Julien Rojer	19	1
AUT	Julian Knowle	ROU	Horia Tecău	36	2
MEX	Santiago González	USA	Scott Lipsky	48	3
PHI	Treat Conrad Huey	GBR	Dominic Inglot	62	4

- Rankings are as of May 27, 2013.

=== Other entrants ===
The following pairs received wildcards into the doubles main draw:

- (Germany) Daniel Brands / (Germany) Tobias Kamke
- (Germany) Robin Kern / (Germany) Jan-Lennard Struff

=== Withdrawals ===
During the tournament

- (Germany) Philipp Petzschner (right shoulder injury)

== Finals ==
=== Singles ===
- (Switzerland) Roger Federer defeated (Russia) Mikhail Youzhny, 6–7^{(5–7)}, 6–3, 6–4

=== Doubles ===
- (Mexico) Santiago González / (United States) Scott Lipsky defeated (Italy) Daniele Bracciali / (Israel) Jonathan Erlich, 6–2, 7–6^{(7–3)}
