= 2013 Monte-Carlo Rolex Masters =

- Date: 13 – 21 April
- Edition: 107th
- Draw: 56S / 24D
- Prize money: €2,998,495
- Surface: Clay
- Location: Roquebrune-Cap-Martin, France
- Venue: Monte Carlo Country Club

Champions

Singles
- (Serbia) Novak Djokovic

Doubles
- (France) Julien Benneteau / (Serbia) Nenad Zimonjić
← 2012 ·	Monte-Carlo Masters	· 2014 →

The 2013 Monte-Carlo Rolex Masters was a men's tennis tournament for male professional players, played from 13 April through 22 April 2013, on outdoor clay courts. It was the 107th edition of the annual Monte Carlo Masters tournament, which was sponsored by Rolex for the fifth time. It took place at the Monte Carlo Country Club in Roquebrune-Cap-Martin, France, near Monte Carlo, Monaco.

Rafael Nadal was the eight-time defending champion, but suffered his first defeat at the tournament since his debut in 2003 (he missed the tournament in 2004 due to injury), by losing in the final to Novak Djokovic. The defeat ended a 46-match winning streak dating back to the first of his eight consecutive titles at the tournament, in 2005.

== Points and prize money ==
=== Points distribution ===
Because the Monte Carlo Masters is the non-mandatory Masters 1000 event, special rules regarding points distribution are in place. The Monte Carlo Masters counts as one of a player's 500 level tournaments, while distributing Masters 1000 points.

Event	W	F	SF	QF	Round of 16	Round of 32	Round of 64	Q	Q2	Q1
Men's singles	1000	600	360	180	90	45	10	25	16	0
Men's doubles	1000	600	360	180	90	45	0	—	—	—

=== Prize money ===
Event	W	F	SF	QF	Round of 16	Round of 32	Round of 64	Q2	Q1
Men's singles	€501,700	€264,000	€123,800	€62,950	€32,700	€17,235	€9,305	€2,140	€1,090
Men's doubles	€155,400	€76,060	€38,150	€19,582	€10,120	€5,340	—	—	—

== Singles main draw entrants ==
=== Seeds ===
Country	Player	Rank	Seed
SRB	Novak Djokovic	1	1
GBR	Andy Murray	2	2
ESP	Rafael Nadal	5	3
CZE	Tomáš Berdych	6	4
ARG	Juan Martín del Potro	7	5
FRA	Jo-Wilfried Tsonga	8	6
FRA	Richard Gasquet	9	7
SRB	Janko Tipsarević	10	8
CRO	Marin Čilić	11	9
ESP	Nicolás Almagro	12	10
FRA	Gilles Simon	13	11
CAN	Milos Raonic	15	12
SUI	Stanislas Wawrinka	17	13
ARG	Juan Mónaco	18	14
ITA	Andreas Seppi	19	15
GER	Philipp Kohlschreiber	21	16

- Rankings are as of April 8, 2013

=== Other entrants ===
The following players received wildcards into the main draw:

- (Monaco) Benjamin Balleret
- (Argentina) Juan Martín del Potro
- (United States) John Isner
- (France) Gaël Monfils

The following players received entry via qualifying:

- (Spain) Pablo Andújar
- (Germany) Daniel Brands
- (Romania) Victor Hănescu
- (Netherlands) Jesse Huta Galung
- (Spain) Albert Montañés
- (Spain) Albert Ramos
- (France) Édouard Roger-Vasselin

=== Withdrawals ===
Before the tournament

- (Spain) David Ferrer (thigh injury)
- (Germany) Tommy Haas
- (Spain) Feliciano López

== Doubles main draw entrants ==
=== Seeds ===
Country	Player	Country	Player	Rank	Seed
USA	Bob Bryan	USA	Mike Bryan	2	1
ESP	Marcel Granollers	ESP	Marc López	7	2
SWE	Robert Lindstedt	CAN	Daniel Nestor	11	3
PAK	Aisam-ul-Haq Qureshi	NED	Jean-Julien Rojer	17	4
BLR	Max Mirnyi	ROU	Horia Tecău	18	5
IND	Mahesh Bhupathi	IND	Rohan Bopanna	22	6
AUT	Alexander Peya	BRA	Bruno Soares	36	7
POL	Mariusz Fyrstenberg	POL	Marcin Matkowski	37	8

- Rankings are as of April 8, 2013

=== Other entrants ===
The following pairs received wildcards into the doubles main draw:

- (Monaco) Benjamin Balleret / (Monaco) Guillaume Couillard
- (Italy) Fabio Fognini / (France) Nicolas Mahut

== Finals ==
=== Singles ===
- (Serbia) Novak Djokovic defeated (Spain) Rafael Nadal, 6–2, 7–6^{(7–1)}

=== Doubles ===
- (France) Julien Benneteau / (Serbia) Nenad Zimonjić defeated (United States) Bob Bryan / (United States) Mike Bryan, 4–6, 7–6^{(7–4)}, [14–12]
