= 2013 Shanghai Rolex Masters =

- Date: October 6–13
- Edition: 5th
- Category: ATP World Tour Masters 1000
- Surface: Hard / outdoor
- Location: Shanghai, China
- Venue: Qizhong Forest Sports City Arena

Champions

Singles
- (Serbia) Novak Djokovic

Doubles
- (Croatia) Ivan Dodig / (Brazil) Marcelo Melo
← 2012 ·	Shanghai Masters	· 2014 →

The 2013 Shanghai Rolex Masters was a men's tennis tournament played on outdoor hard courts. It was the fifth edition of the Shanghai ATP Masters 1000, classified as an ATP World Tour Masters 1000 event on the 2013 ATP World Tour. It took place at Qizhong Forest Sports City Arena in Shanghai, China from October 6 to October 13, 2013. First-seeded Novak Djokovic won the singles title.

== Points and prize money ==
=== Point distribution ===
Event	W	F	SF	QF	Round of 16	Round of 32	Round of 64	Q	Q2	Q1
Singles	1000	600	360	180	90	45	10	25	16	0
Doubles	1000	600	360	180	90	0	—	—	—	—

=== Prize money ===
Event	W	F	SF	QF	Round of 16	Round of 32	Round of 64	Q2	Q1
Singles	$729,725	$357,800	$180,075	$91,570	$47,550	$25,070	$13,535	$3,120	$1,590
Doubles	$226,000	$110,600	$55,500	$28,480	$14,720	$7,770	—	—	—

== Singles main-draw entrants ==
=== Seeds ===
Country	Player	Rank^{1}	Seed
SRB	Novak Djokovic	1	1
ESP	Rafael Nadal	2	2
ESP	David Ferrer	4	3
CZE	Tomáš Berdych	5	4
SUI	Roger Federer	6	5
ARG	Juan Martín del Potro	7	6
FRA	Jo-Wilfried Tsonga	8	7
SUI	Stanislas Wawrinka	9	8
FRA	Richard Gasquet	10	9
CAN	Milos Raonic	11	10
GER	Tommy Haas	12	11
JPN	Kei Nishikori	13	12
FRA	Gilles Simon	14	13
USA	John Isner	16	14
ESP	Nicolás Almagro	17	15
ESP	Tommy Robredo	18	16

- ^{1} Rankings are as of September 30, 2013

=== Other entrants ===
The following players received wildcards into the singles main draw:

- (China) Gong Maoxin
- (Australia) Lleyton Hewitt
- (China) Wu Di
- (China) Zhang Ze

The following players received entry from the qualifying draw:

- (Colombia) Alejandro Falla
- (Colombia) Santiago Giraldo
- (Japan) Tatsuma Ito
- (Italy) Paolo Lorenzi
- (Poland) Michał Przysiężny
- (United States) Michael Russell
- (Japan) Go Soeda

=== Withdrawals ===
Before the tournament

- (Croatia) Marin Čilić (suspension)
- (Russia) Nikolay Davydenko
- (Latvia) Ernests Gulbis
- (Poland) Jerzy Janowicz
- (Argentina) Juan Mónaco
- (United Kingdom) Andy Murray (back surgery)

During the tournament

- (Germany) Tommy Haas (back injury)

=== Retirements ===
- (Spain) Tommy Robredo (wrist injury)
- (Russia) Mikhail Youzhny (stomach pain)

== Doubles main-draw entrants ==
=== Seeds ===
Country	Player	Country	Player	Rank^{1}	Seed
USA	Bob Bryan	USA	Mike Bryan	2	1
ESP	Marcel Granollers	ESP	Marc López	17	2
CAN	Daniel Nestor	IND	Leander Paes	19	3
PAK	Aisam-ul-Haq Qureshi	NED	Jean-Julien Rojer	29	4
CRO	Ivan Dodig	BRA	Marcelo Melo	31	5
IND	Rohan Bopanna	FRA	Édouard Roger-Vasselin	33	6
FRA	Julien Benneteau	SRB	Nenad Zimonjić	35	7
ESP	David Marrero	ESP	Fernando Verdasco	38	8

- Rankings are as of September 30, 2013

=== Other entrants ===
The following pairs received wildcards into the doubles main draw:

- (Switzerland) Roger Federer / (China) Zhang Ze
- (China) Gong Maoxin / (China) Li Zhe

The following pairs received entry as alternates:

- (Germany) Andre Begemann / (Germany) Martin Emmrich
- (Czech Republic) Lukáš Rosol / (Australia) Bernard Tomic

=== Withdrawals ===
Before the tournament

- (United States) Sam Querrey (abdominal injury)
- (Spain) Tommy Robredo (wrist injury)

During the tournament

- (Argentina) Juan Martín del Potro (fever)

== Finals ==
=== Singles ===
- (Serbia) Novak Djokovic defeated (Argentina) Juan Martín del Potro 6–1, 3–6, 7–6^{(7–3)}

=== Doubles ===
- (Croatia) Ivan Dodig / (Brazil) Marcelo Melo defeated (Spain) David Marrero / (Spain) Fernando Verdasco 7–6^{(7–2)}, 6–7^{(6–8)}, [10–2]
