= 2013 ATP World Tour =

Men's tennis circuit

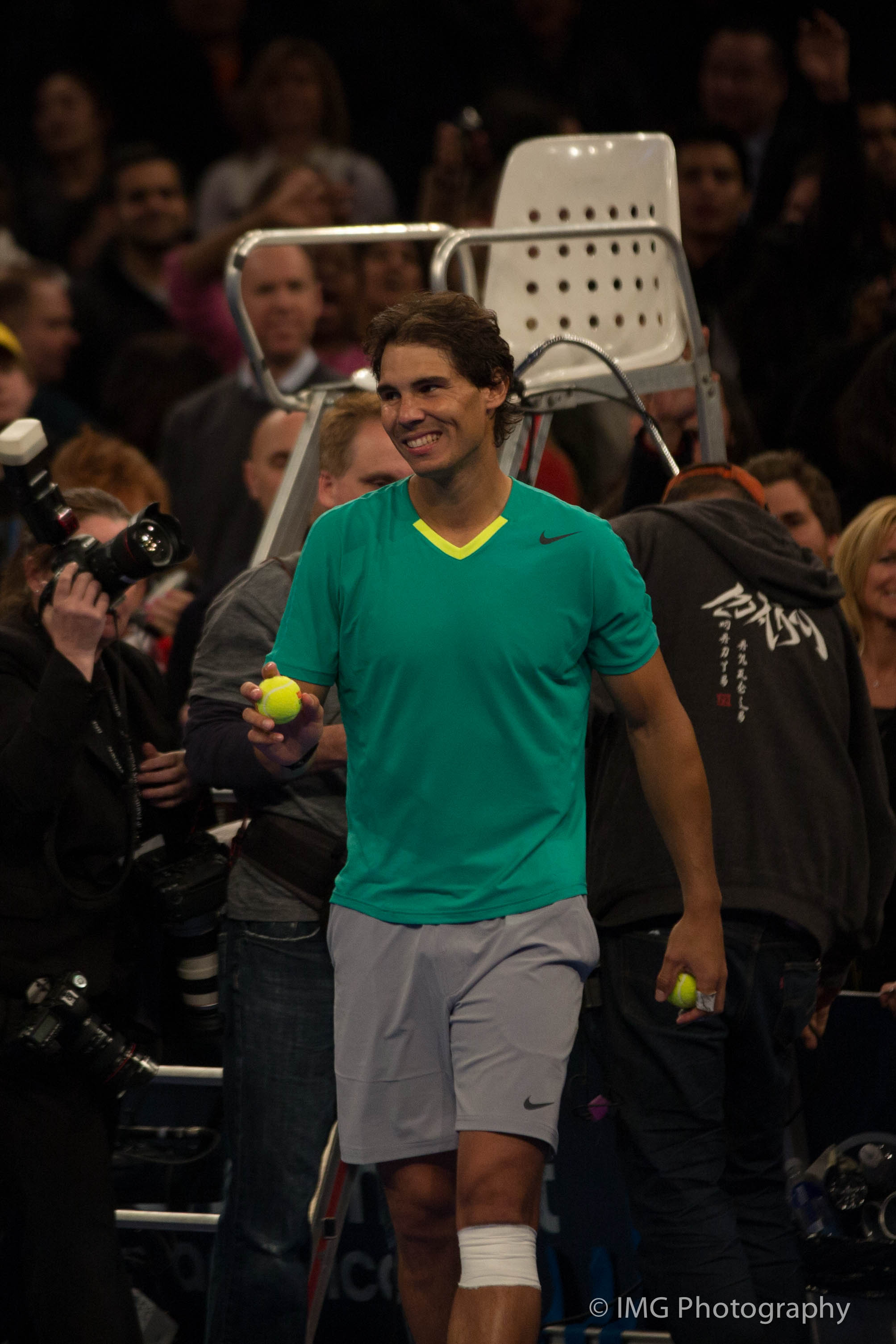
- Rafael Nadal finished the year as world No.1 for the third time in his career. He won ten tournaments during the season, including two majors at the French Open and the US Open. He also won five Masters 1000 events.

Details
- Duration: 29 December 2012 – 17 November 2013
- Edition: 44th
- Tournaments: 65
- Categories: Grand Slam (4); ATP World Tour Finals; ATP World Tour Masters 1000 (9); ATP World Tour 500 (11); ATP World Tour 250 (40)

Achievements (singles)
- Most titles: (Spain) Rafael Nadal (10)
- Most finals: (Spain) Rafael Nadal (14)
- Prize money leader: (Spain) Rafael Nadal ($14,570,935)
- Points leader: (Spain) Rafael Nadal (13,030)

Awards
- Player of the year: (Spain) Rafael Nadal
- Doubles team of the year: (United States) Bob Bryan; (United States) Mike Bryan
- Most improved player of the year: (Spain) Pablo Carreño Busta
- Star of tomorrow: (Czech Republic) Jiří Veselý
- Comeback player of the year: (Spain) Rafael Nadal

The 2013 ATP World Tour was the global elite professional tennis circuit organized by the Association of Tennis Professionals (ATP) for the 2013 tennis season. The 2013 ATP World Tour calendar comprises the Grand Slam tournaments (supervised by the International Tennis Federation (ITF)), the ATP World Tour Masters 1000, the ATP World Tour 500 series, the ATP World Tour 250 series, the Davis Cup (organized by the ITF) and the ATP World Tour Finals. Also included in the 2013 calendar is the Hopman Cup, which was organized by the ITF and does not distribute ranking points.

== Schedule ==
This is the complete schedule of events on the 2013 calendar, with player progression documented from the quarterfinals stage.

Key

Grand Slam
ATP World Tour Finals
ATP World Tour Masters 1000
ATP World Tour 500
ATP World Tour 250
Team Events

=== January ===
| Week | Tournament | Champions | Runners-up | Semifinalists | Quarterfinalists |
|---|---|---|---|---|---|
| 31 Dec | Hopman Cup; Perth, Australia; ITF Mixed Teams Championships; Hard (i) – $1,000,000 – 8 teams (RR) | Spain; 2–1 | Serbia | Round robin (Group A) Australia; Italy; Germany | Round robin (Group B) United States; South Africa; France |
| 31 Dec | Brisbane International; Brisbane, Australia; ATP World Tour 250; Hard – $494,230 – 28S/32Q/16D; Singles – Doubles | (United Kingdom) Andy Murray; 7–6^{(7–0)}, 6–4 | (Bulgaria) Grigor Dimitrov | (Japan) Kei Nishikori (Cyprus) Marcos Baghdatis | (Uzbekistan) Denis Istomin (Ukraine) Alexandr Dolgopolov (France) Gilles Simon (Austria) Jürgen Melzer |
| 31 Dec | Brisbane International; Brisbane, Australia; ATP World Tour 250; Hard – $494,230 – 28S/32Q/16D; Singles – Doubles | (Brazil) Marcelo Melo (Spain) Tommy Robredo; 4–6, 6–1, [10–5] | (United States) Eric Butorac (Australia) Paul Hanley | (Japan) Kei Nishikori (Cyprus) Marcos Baghdatis | (Uzbekistan) Denis Istomin (Ukraine) Alexandr Dolgopolov (France) Gilles Simon (Austria) Jürgen Melzer |
| 31 Dec | Aircel Chennai Open; Chennai, India; ATP World Tour 250; Hard – $442,750 – 28S/32Q/16D; Singles – Doubles | (Serbia) Janko Tipsarević; 3–6, 6–1, 6–3 | (Spain) Roberto Bautista Agut | (France) Benoît Paire (Slovenia) Aljaž Bedene | (Czech Republic) Tomáš Berdych (Croatia) Marin Čilić (Switzerland) Stanislas Wawrinka (Japan) Go Soeda |
| 31 Dec | Aircel Chennai Open; Chennai, India; ATP World Tour 250; Hard – $442,750 – 28S/32Q/16D; Singles – Doubles | (France) Benoît Paire (Switzerland) Stanislas Wawrinka; 6–2, 6–1 | (Germany) Andre Begemann (Germany) Martin Emmrich | (France) Benoît Paire (Slovenia) Aljaž Bedene | (Czech Republic) Tomáš Berdych (Croatia) Marin Čilić (Switzerland) Stanislas Wawrinka (Japan) Go Soeda |
| 31 Dec | Qatar ExxonMobil Open; Doha, Qatar; ATP World Tour 250; Hard – $1,150,720 – 32S/32Q/16D; Singles – Doubles | (France) Richard Gasquet; 3–6, 7–6^{(7–4)}, 6–3 | (Russia) Nikolay Davydenko | (Spain) David Ferrer (Germany) Daniel Brands | (Italy) Paolo Lorenzi (Italy) Simone Bolelli (France) Gaël Monfils (Slovakia) Lukáš Lacko |
| 31 Dec | Qatar ExxonMobil Open; Doha, Qatar; ATP World Tour 250; Hard – $1,150,720 – 32S/32Q/16D; Singles – Doubles | (Germany) Christopher Kas (Germany) Philipp Kohlschreiber; 7–5, 6–4 | (Austria) Julian Knowle (Slovakia) Filip Polášek | (Spain) David Ferrer (Germany) Daniel Brands | (Italy) Paolo Lorenzi (Italy) Simone Bolelli (France) Gaël Monfils (Slovakia) Lukáš Lacko |
| 7 Jan | Apia International Sydney; Sydney, Australia; ATP World Tour 250; Hard – $494,230 – 28S/32Q/16D; Singles – Doubles | (Australia) Bernard Tomic; 6–3, 6–7^{(2–7)}, 6–3 | (South Africa) Kevin Anderson | (France) Julien Benneteau (Italy) Andreas Seppi | (United States) Ryan Harrison (Uzbekistan) Denis Istomin (Spain) Marcel Granollers (Finland) Jarkko Nieminen |
| 7 Jan | Apia International Sydney; Sydney, Australia; ATP World Tour 250; Hard – $494,230 – 28S/32Q/16D; Singles – Doubles | (United States) Bob Bryan (United States) Mike Bryan; 6–4, 6–4 | (Belarus) Max Mirnyi (Romania) Horia Tecău | (France) Julien Benneteau (Italy) Andreas Seppi | (United States) Ryan Harrison (Uzbekistan) Denis Istomin (Spain) Marcel Granollers (Finland) Jarkko Nieminen |
| 7 Jan | Heineken Open; Auckland, New Zealand; ATP World Tour 250; Hard – $491,000 – 28S/32Q/16D; Singles – Doubles | (Spain) David Ferrer; 7–6^{(7–5)}, 6–1 | (Germany) Philipp Kohlschreiber | (France) Gaël Monfils (United States) Sam Querrey | (Slovakia) Lukáš Lacko (Germany) Tommy Haas (Canada) Jesse Levine (Belgium) Xavier Malisse |
| 7 Jan | Heineken Open; Auckland, New Zealand; ATP World Tour 250; Hard – $491,000 – 28S/32Q/16D; Singles – Doubles | (United Kingdom) Colin Fleming (Brazil) Bruno Soares; 7–6^{(7–1)}, 7–6^{(7–2)} | (Sweden) Johan Brunström (Denmark) Frederik Nielsen | (France) Gaël Monfils (United States) Sam Querrey | (Slovakia) Lukáš Lacko (Germany) Tommy Haas (Canada) Jesse Levine (Belgium) Xavier Malisse |
| 14 Jan; 21 Jan | Australian Open; Melbourne, Australia; Grand Slam; Hard – A$16,000,000; 128S/128Q/64D/32X; Singles – Doubles – Mixed doubles | (Serbia) Novak Djokovic; 6–7^{(2–7)}, 7–6^{(7–3)}, 6–3, 6–2 | (United Kingdom) Andy Murray | (Spain) David Ferrer (Switzerland) Roger Federer | (Czech Republic) Tomáš Berdych (Spain) Nicolás Almagro (France) Jérémy Chardy (France) Jo-Wilfried Tsonga |
| 14 Jan; 21 Jan | Australian Open; Melbourne, Australia; Grand Slam; Hard – A$16,000,000; 128S/128Q/64D/32X; Singles – Doubles – Mixed doubles | (United States) Bob Bryan (United States) Mike Bryan; 6–3, 6–4 | (Netherlands) Robin Haase (Netherlands) Igor Sijsling | (Spain) David Ferrer (Switzerland) Roger Federer | (Czech Republic) Tomáš Berdych (Spain) Nicolás Almagro (France) Jérémy Chardy (France) Jo-Wilfried Tsonga |
| 14 Jan; 21 Jan | Australian Open; Melbourne, Australia; Grand Slam; Hard – A$16,000,000; 128S/128Q/64D/32X; Singles – Doubles – Mixed doubles | (Australia) Jarmila Gajdošová (Australia) Matthew Ebden; 6–3, 7–5 | (Czech Republic) Lucie Hradecká (Czech Republic) František Čermák | (Spain) David Ferrer (Switzerland) Roger Federer | (Czech Republic) Tomáš Berdych (Spain) Nicolás Almagro (France) Jérémy Chardy (France) Jo-Wilfried Tsonga |
| 28 Jan | Davis Cup first round Vancouver, Canada – hard (i); Turin, Italy – clay (red) (i); Charleroi, Belgium – clay (red) (i); Jacksonville, United States – hard (i); Rouen, France – hard (i); Buenos Aires, Argentina – clay (red); Astana, Kazakhstan – clay (red) (i); Geneva, Switzerland – hard (i) | First round winners Canada 3–2; Italy 3–2; Serbia 3–2; United States 3–2; France 5–0; Argentina 5–0; Kazakhstan 3–1; Czech Republic 3–2 | First round losers Spain; Croatia; Belgium; Brazil; Israel; Germany; Austria; Switzerland | | |

=== February ===
| Week | Tournament | Champions | Runners-up | Semifinalists | Quarterfinalists |
|---|---|---|---|---|---|
| 4 Feb | Open Sud de France; Montpellier, France; ATP World Tour 250; Hard (i) – €467,800 – 28S/32Q/16D; Singles – Doubles | (France) Richard Gasquet; 6–2, 6–3 | (France) Benoît Paire | (Finland) Jarkko Nieminen (France) Michaël Llodra | (Ukraine) Sergiy Stakhovsky (France) Julien Benneteau (France) Gilles Simon (Czech Republic) Jan Hájek |
| 4 Feb | Open Sud de France; Montpellier, France; ATP World Tour 250; Hard (i) – €467,800 – 28S/32Q/16D; Singles – Doubles | (France) Marc Gicquel (France) Michaël Llodra; 6–3, 3–6, [11–9] | (Sweden) Johan Brunström (South Africa) Raven Klaasen | (Finland) Jarkko Nieminen (France) Michaël Llodra | (Ukraine) Sergiy Stakhovsky (France) Julien Benneteau (France) Gilles Simon (Czech Republic) Jan Hájek |
| 4 Feb | PBZ Zagreb Indoors; Zagreb, Croatia; ATP World Tour 250; Hard (i) – €467,800 – 28S/32Q/16D; Singles – Doubles | (Croatia) Marin Čilić; 6–3, 6–1 | (Austria) Jürgen Melzer | (Russia) Mikhail Youzhny (Netherlands) Robin Haase | (Slovenia) Blaž Kavčič (Croatia) Ivan Dodig (Czech Republic) Lukáš Rosol (Germany) Philipp Petzschner |
| 4 Feb | PBZ Zagreb Indoors; Zagreb, Croatia; ATP World Tour 250; Hard (i) – €467,800 – 28S/32Q/16D; Singles – Doubles | (Austria) Julian Knowle (Slovakia) Filip Polášek; 6–3, 6–3 | (Croatia) Ivan Dodig (Croatia) Mate Pavić | (Russia) Mikhail Youzhny (Netherlands) Robin Haase | (Slovenia) Blaž Kavčič (Croatia) Ivan Dodig (Czech Republic) Lukáš Rosol (Germany) Philipp Petzschner |
| 4 Feb | VTR Open; Viña del Mar, Chile; ATP World Tour 250; Clay (red) – $467,800 – 28S/32Q/16D; Singles – Doubles | (Argentina) Horacio Zeballos; 6–7^{(2–7)}, 7–6^{(8–6)}, 6–4 | (Spain) Rafael Nadal | (France) Jérémy Chardy (Argentina) Carlos Berlocq | (Spain) Daniel Gimeno Traver (Italy) Paolo Lorenzi (Spain) Albert Ramos (France) Guillaume Rufin |
| 4 Feb | VTR Open; Viña del Mar, Chile; ATP World Tour 250; Clay (red) – $467,800 – 28S/32Q/16D; Singles – Doubles | (Italy) Paolo Lorenzi (Italy) Potito Starace; 6–2, 6–4 | (Argentina) Juan Mónaco (Spain) Rafael Nadal | (France) Jérémy Chardy (Argentina) Carlos Berlocq | (Spain) Daniel Gimeno Traver (Italy) Paolo Lorenzi (Spain) Albert Ramos (France) Guillaume Rufin |
| 11 Feb | ABN AMRO World Tennis Tournament; Rotterdam, Netherlands; ATP World Tour 500; Hard (i) – €1,575,875 – 32S/16Q/16D; Singles – Doubles | (Argentina) Juan Martín del Potro; 7–6^{(7–2)}, 6–3 | (France) Julien Benneteau | (France) Gilles Simon (Bulgaria) Grigor Dimitrov | (Switzerland) Roger Federer (Slovakia) Martin Kližan (Cyprus) Marcos Baghdatis (Finland) Jarkko Nieminen |
| 11 Feb | ABN AMRO World Tennis Tournament; Rotterdam, Netherlands; ATP World Tour 500; Hard (i) – €1,575,875 – 32S/16Q/16D; Singles – Doubles | (Sweden) Robert Lindstedt (Serbia) Nenad Zimonjić; 5–7, 6–3, [10–8] | (Netherlands) Thiemo de Bakker (Netherlands) Jesse Huta Galung | (France) Gilles Simon (Bulgaria) Grigor Dimitrov | (Switzerland) Roger Federer (Slovakia) Martin Kližan (Cyprus) Marcos Baghdatis (Finland) Jarkko Nieminen |
| 11 Feb | SAP Open; San Jose, United States; ATP World Tour 250; Hard (i) – $623,730 – 28S/32Q/16D; Singles – Doubles | (Canada) Milos Raonic; 6–4, 6–3 | (Germany) Tommy Haas | (United States) Sam Querrey (United States) John Isner | (Uzbekistan) Denis Istomin (Colombia) Alejandro Falla (United States) Steve Johnson (Belgium) Xavier Malisse |
| 11 Feb | SAP Open; San Jose, United States; ATP World Tour 250; Hard (i) – $623,730 – 28S/32Q/16D; Singles – Doubles | (Belgium) Xavier Malisse (Germany) Frank Moser; 6–0, 6–7^{(5–7)}, [10–4] | (Australia) Lleyton Hewitt (Australia) Marinko Matosevic | (United States) Sam Querrey (United States) John Isner | (Uzbekistan) Denis Istomin (Colombia) Alejandro Falla (United States) Steve Johnson (Belgium) Xavier Malisse |
| 11 Feb | Brasil Open; São Paulo, Brazil; ATP World Tour 250; Clay (red) (i) – $519,775 – 28S/32Q/16D; Singles – Doubles | (Spain) Rafael Nadal; 6–2, 6–3 | (Argentina) David Nalbandian | (Argentina) Martín Alund (Italy) Simone Bolelli | (Argentina) Carlos Berlocq (Italy) Filippo Volandri (Spain) Albert Montañés (Spain) Nicolás Almagro |
| 11 Feb | Brasil Open; São Paulo, Brazil; ATP World Tour 250; Clay (red) (i) – $519,775 – 28S/32Q/16D; Singles – Doubles | (Austria) Alexander Peya (Brazil) Bruno Soares; 6–7^{(5–7)}, 6–2, [10–7] | (Czech Republic) František Čermák (Slovakia) Michal Mertiňák | (Argentina) Martín Alund (Italy) Simone Bolelli | (Argentina) Carlos Berlocq (Italy) Filippo Volandri (Spain) Albert Montañés (Spain) Nicolás Almagro |
| 18 Feb | U.S. National Indoor Tennis Championships; Memphis, United States; ATP World Tour 500; Hard (i) – $1,353,550 – 32S/16Q/16D; Singles – Doubles | (Japan) Kei Nishikori; 6–2, 6–3 | (Spain) Feliciano López | (Australia) Marinko Matosevic (Uzbekistan) Denis Istomin | (Croatia) Marin Čilić (Ukraine) Alexandr Dolgopolov (United States) Michael Russell (United States) Jack Sock |
| 18 Feb | U.S. National Indoor Tennis Championships; Memphis, United States; ATP World Tour 500; Hard (i) – $1,353,550 – 32S/16Q/16D; Singles – Doubles | (United States) Bob Bryan (United States) Mike Bryan; 6–1, 6–2 | (United States) James Blake (United States) Jack Sock | (Australia) Marinko Matosevic (Uzbekistan) Denis Istomin | (Croatia) Marin Čilić (Ukraine) Alexandr Dolgopolov (United States) Michael Russell (United States) Jack Sock |
| 18 Feb | Open 13; Marseille, France; ATP World Tour 250; Hard (i) – €598,535 – 28S/32Q/16D; Singles – Doubles | (France) Jo-Wilfried Tsonga; 3–6, 7–6^{(8–6)}, 6–4 | (Czech Republic) Tomáš Berdych | (Russia) Dmitry Tursunov (France) Gilles Simon | (Poland) Jerzy Janowicz (Luxembourg) Gilles Müller (Australia) Bernard Tomic (Argentina) Juan Martín del Potro |
| 18 Feb | Open 13; Marseille, France; ATP World Tour 250; Hard (i) – €598,535 – 28S/32Q/16D; Singles – Doubles | (India) Rohan Bopanna (United Kingdom) Colin Fleming; 6–4, 7–6^{(7–3)} | (Pakistan) Aisam-ul-Haq Qureshi (Netherlands) Jean-Julien Rojer | (Russia) Dmitry Tursunov (France) Gilles Simon | (Poland) Jerzy Janowicz (Luxembourg) Gilles Müller (Australia) Bernard Tomic (Argentina) Juan Martín del Potro |
| 18 Feb | Copa Claro; Buenos Aires, Argentina; ATP World Tour 250; Clay (red) – $570,470 – 32S/32Q/16D; Singles – Doubles | (Spain) David Ferrer; 6–4, 3–6, 6–1 | (Switzerland) Stanislas Wawrinka | (Spain) Tommy Robredo (Spain) Nicolás Almagro | (Italy) Fabio Fognini (Germany) Julian Reister (Spain) Albert Ramos (Argentina) Federico Delbonis |
| 18 Feb | Copa Claro; Buenos Aires, Argentina; ATP World Tour 250; Clay (red) – $570,470 – 32S/32Q/16D; Singles – Doubles | (Italy) Simone Bolelli (Italy) Fabio Fognini; 6–3, 6–2 | (United States) Nicholas Monroe (Germany) Simon Stadler | (Spain) Tommy Robredo (Spain) Nicolás Almagro | (Italy) Fabio Fognini (Germany) Julian Reister (Spain) Albert Ramos (Argentina) Federico Delbonis |
| 25 Feb | Dubai Tennis Championships; Dubai, United Arab Emirates; ATP World Tour 500; Hard – $2,413,300 – 32S/16Q/16D; Singles – Doubles | (Serbia) Novak Djokovic; 7–5, 6–3 | (Czech Republic) Tomáš Berdych | (Argentina) Juan Martín del Potro (Switzerland) Roger Federer | (Italy) Andreas Seppi (Germany) Daniel Brands (Russia) Dmitry Tursunov (Russia) Nikolay Davydenko |
| 25 Feb | Dubai Tennis Championships; Dubai, United Arab Emirates; ATP World Tour 500; Hard – $2,413,300 – 32S/16Q/16D; Singles – Doubles | (India) Mahesh Bhupathi (France) Michaël Llodra; 7–6^{(8–6)}, 7–6^{(8–6)} | (Sweden) Robert Lindstedt (Serbia) Nenad Zimonjić | (Argentina) Juan Martín del Potro (Switzerland) Roger Federer | (Italy) Andreas Seppi (Germany) Daniel Brands (Russia) Dmitry Tursunov (Russia) Nikolay Davydenko |
| 25 Feb | Abierto Mexicano Telcel; Acapulco, Mexico; ATP World Tour 500; Clay (red) – $1,353,550 – 32S/16Q/16D; Singles – Doubles | (Spain) Rafael Nadal; 6–0, 6–2 | (Spain) David Ferrer | (Italy) Fabio Fognini (Spain) Nicolás Almagro | (Italy) Paolo Lorenzi (Colombia) Santiago Giraldo (Argentina) Horacio Zeballos (Argentina) Leonardo Mayer |
| 25 Feb | Abierto Mexicano Telcel; Acapulco, Mexico; ATP World Tour 500; Clay (red) – $1,353,550 – 32S/16Q/16D; Singles – Doubles | (Poland) Łukasz Kubot (Spain) David Marrero; 7–5, 6–2 | (Italy) Simone Bolelli (Italy) Fabio Fognini | (Italy) Fabio Fognini (Spain) Nicolás Almagro | (Italy) Paolo Lorenzi (Colombia) Santiago Giraldo (Argentina) Horacio Zeballos (Argentina) Leonardo Mayer |
| 25 Feb | Delray Beach International Tennis Championships; Delray Beach, United States; ATP World Tour 250; Hard – $519,775 – 32S/32Q/16D; Singles – Doubles | (Latvia) Ernests Gulbis; 7–6^{(7–3)}, 6–3 | (France) Édouard Roger-Vasselin | (United States) John Isner (Germany) Tommy Haas | (South Africa) Kevin Anderson (Lithuania) Ričardas Berankis (Spain) Daniel Muñoz de la Nava (Croatia) Ivan Dodig |
| 25 Feb | Delray Beach International Tennis Championships; Delray Beach, United States; ATP World Tour 250; Hard – $519,775 – 32S/32Q/16D; Singles – Doubles | (United States) James Blake (United States) Jack Sock; 6–4, 6–4 | (Belarus) Max Mirnyi (Romania) Horia Tecău | (United States) John Isner (Germany) Tommy Haas | (South Africa) Kevin Anderson (Lithuania) Ričardas Berankis (Spain) Daniel Muñoz de la Nava (Croatia) Ivan Dodig |

=== March ===
| Week | Tournament | Champions | Runners-up | Semifinalists | Quarterfinalists |
|---|---|---|---|---|---|
| 4 Mar; 11 Mar | Indian Wells Open; Indian Wells, United States; ATP World Tour Masters 1000; Hard – $5,244,125 – 96S/48Q/32D; Singles – Doubles | (Spain) Rafael Nadal; 4–6, 6–3, 6–4 | (Argentina) Juan Martín del Potro | (Serbia) Novak Djokovic (Czech Republic) Tomáš Berdych | (France) Jo-Wilfried Tsonga (United Kingdom) Andy Murray (South Africa) Kevin Anderson (Switzerland) Roger Federer |
| 4 Mar; 11 Mar | Indian Wells Open; Indian Wells, United States; ATP World Tour Masters 1000; Hard – $5,244,125 – 96S/48Q/32D; Singles – Doubles | (United States) Bob Bryan (United States) Mike Bryan; 6–3, 3–6, [10–6] | (Philippines) Treat Conrad Huey (Poland) Jerzy Janowicz | (Serbia) Novak Djokovic (Czech Republic) Tomáš Berdych | (France) Jo-Wilfried Tsonga (United Kingdom) Andy Murray (South Africa) Kevin Anderson (Switzerland) Roger Federer |
| 18 Mar; 25 Mar | Sony Open Tennis; Key Biscayne, United States; ATP World Tour Masters 1000; Hard – $5,185,625 – 96S/48Q/32D; Singles – Doubles | (United Kingdom) Andy Murray; 2–6, 6–4, 7–6^{(7–1)} | (Spain) David Ferrer | (Germany) Tommy Haas (France) Richard Gasquet | (France) Gilles Simon (Austria) Jürgen Melzer (Czech Republic) Tomáš Berdych (Croatia) Marin Čilić |
| 18 Mar; 25 Mar | Sony Open Tennis; Key Biscayne, United States; ATP World Tour Masters 1000; Hard – $5,185,625 – 96S/48Q/32D; Singles – Doubles | (Pakistan) Aisam-ul-Haq Qureshi (Netherlands) Jean-Julien Rojer; 6–4, 6–1 | (Poland) Mariusz Fyrstenberg (Poland) Marcin Matkowski | (Germany) Tommy Haas (France) Richard Gasquet | (France) Gilles Simon (Austria) Jürgen Melzer (Czech Republic) Tomáš Berdych (Croatia) Marin Čilić |

=== April ===
| Week | Tournament | Champions | Runners-up | Semifinalists | Quarterfinalists |
|---|---|---|---|---|---|
| 1 Apr | Davis Cup Quarterfinals; Vancouver, Canada – hard (i); Boise, United States – hard (i); Buenos Aires, Argentina – clay (red); Astana, Kazakhstan – clay (red) (i) | Quarterfinals winners Canada 3–1; Serbia 3–1; Argentina 3–2; Czech Republic 3–1 | Quarterfinals losers Italy; United States; France; Kazakhstan | | |
| 8 Apr | U.S. Men's Clay Court Championships; Houston, United States; ATP World Tour 250; Clay (maroon) – $519,775 – 28S/32Q/16D; Singles – Doubles | (United States) John Isner; 6–3, 7–5 | (Spain) Nicolás Almagro | (United States) Rhyne Williams (Argentina) Juan Mónaco | (Italy) Paolo Lorenzi (Spain) Rubén Ramírez Hidalgo (United States) Robby Ginepri (Lithuania) Ričardas Berankis |
| 8 Apr | U.S. Men's Clay Court Championships; Houston, United States; ATP World Tour 250; Clay (maroon) – $519,775 – 28S/32Q/16D; Singles – Doubles | (United Kingdom) Jamie Murray (Australia) John Peers; 1–6, 7–6^{(7–3)}, [12–10] | (United States) Bob Bryan (United States) Mike Bryan | (United States) Rhyne Williams (Argentina) Juan Mónaco | (Italy) Paolo Lorenzi (Spain) Rubén Ramírez Hidalgo (United States) Robby Ginepri (Lithuania) Ričardas Berankis |
| 8 Apr | Grand Prix Hassan II; Casablanca, Morocco; ATP World Tour 250; Clay (red) – €467,800 – 28S/32Q/16D; Singles – Doubles | (Spain) Tommy Robredo; 7–6^{(8–6)}, 4–6, 6–3 | (South Africa) Kevin Anderson | (Switzerland) Stanislas Wawrinka (Slovakia) Martin Kližan | (Spain) Guillermo García López (France) Benoît Paire (Netherlands) Robin Haase (Slovenia) Grega Žemlja |
| 8 Apr | Grand Prix Hassan II; Casablanca, Morocco; ATP World Tour 250; Clay (red) – €467,800 – 28S/32Q/16D; Singles – Doubles | (Austria) Julian Knowle (Slovakia) Filip Polášek; 6–3, 6–2 | (Germany) Dustin Brown (Germany) Christopher Kas | (Switzerland) Stanislas Wawrinka (Slovakia) Martin Kližan | (Spain) Guillermo García López (France) Benoît Paire (Netherlands) Robin Haase (Slovenia) Grega Žemlja |
| 15 Apr | Monte-Carlo Rolex Masters; Roquebrune-Cap-Martin, France; ATP World Tour Masters 1000; Clay (red) – €2,998,495 – 56S/28Q/24D; Singles – Doubles | (Serbia) Novak Djokovic; 6–2, 7–6^{(7–1)} | (Spain) Rafael Nadal | (Italy) Fabio Fognini (France) Jo-Wilfried Tsonga | (Finland) Jarkko Nieminen (France) Richard Gasquet (Bulgaria) Grigor Dimitrov (Switzerland) Stanislas Wawrinka |
| 15 Apr | Monte-Carlo Rolex Masters; Roquebrune-Cap-Martin, France; ATP World Tour Masters 1000; Clay (red) – €2,998,495 – 56S/28Q/24D; Singles – Doubles | (France) Julien Benneteau (Serbia) Nenad Zimonjić; 4–6, 7–6^{(7–4)}, [14–12] | (United States) Bob Bryan (United States) Mike Bryan | (Italy) Fabio Fognini (France) Jo-Wilfried Tsonga | (Finland) Jarkko Nieminen (France) Richard Gasquet (Bulgaria) Grigor Dimitrov (Switzerland) Stanislas Wawrinka |
| 22 Apr | Barcelona Open BancSabadell; Barcelona, Spain; ATP World Tour 500; Clay (red) – €2,166,875 – 48S/24Q/16D; Singles – Doubles | (Spain) Rafael Nadal; 6–4, 6–3 | (Spain) Nicolás Almagro | (Germany) Philipp Kohlschreiber (Canada) Milos Raonic | (Brazil) Thomaz Bellucci (Argentina) Juan Mónaco (Spain) Tommy Robredo (Spain) Albert Ramos |
| 22 Apr | Barcelona Open BancSabadell; Barcelona, Spain; ATP World Tour 500; Clay (red) – €2,166,875 – 48S/24Q/16D; Singles – Doubles | (Austria) Alexander Peya (Brazil) Bruno Soares; 5–7, 7–6^{(9–7)}, [10–4] | (Sweden) Robert Lindstedt (Canada) Daniel Nestor | (Germany) Philipp Kohlschreiber (Canada) Milos Raonic | (Brazil) Thomaz Bellucci (Argentina) Juan Mónaco (Spain) Tommy Robredo (Spain) Albert Ramos |
| 22 Apr | BRD Năstase Țiriac Trophy; Bucharest, Romania; ATP World Tour 250; Clay (red) – €467,800 – 28S/32Q/16D; Singles – Doubles | (Czech Republic) Lukáš Rosol; 6–3, 6–2 | (Spain) Guillermo García López | (Germany) Florian Mayer (France) Gilles Simon | (Serbia) Janko Tipsarević (Romania) Victor Hănescu (Serbia) Viktor Troicki (Germany) Daniel Brands |
| 22 Apr | BRD Năstase Țiriac Trophy; Bucharest, Romania; ATP World Tour 250; Clay (red) – €467,800 – 28S/32Q/16D; Singles – Doubles | (Belarus) Max Mirnyi (Romania) Horia Tecău; 4–6, 6–4, [10–6] | (Czech Republic) Lukáš Dlouhý (Austria) Oliver Marach | (Germany) Florian Mayer (France) Gilles Simon | (Serbia) Janko Tipsarević (Romania) Victor Hănescu (Serbia) Viktor Troicki (Germany) Daniel Brands |
| 29 Apr | BMW Open; Munich, Germany; ATP World Tour 250; Clay (red) – €467,800 – 28S/32Q/16D; Singles – Doubles | (Germany) Tommy Haas; 6–3, 7–6^{(7–3)} | (Germany) Philipp Kohlschreiber | (Germany) Daniel Brands (Croatia) Ivan Dodig | (Serbia) Janko Tipsarević (Serbia) Viktor Troicki (Germany) Florian Mayer (Ukraine) Alexandr Dolgopolov |
| 29 Apr | BMW Open; Munich, Germany; ATP World Tour 250; Clay (red) – €467,800 – 28S/32Q/16D; Singles – Doubles | (Finland) Jarkko Nieminen (Russia) Dmitry Tursunov; 6–1, 6–4 | (Cyprus) Marcos Baghdatis (United States) Eric Butorac | (Germany) Daniel Brands (Croatia) Ivan Dodig | (Serbia) Janko Tipsarević (Serbia) Viktor Troicki (Germany) Florian Mayer (Ukraine) Alexandr Dolgopolov |
| 29 Apr | Portugal Open; Oeiras, Portugal; ATP World Tour 250; Clay (red) – €467,800 – 28S/32Q/16D; Singles – Doubles | (Switzerland) Stanislas Wawrinka; 6–1, 6–4 | (Spain) David Ferrer | (Italy) Andreas Seppi (Spain) Pablo Carreño Busta | (Romania) Victor Hănescu (Spain) Tommy Robredo (Italy) Fabio Fognini (Portugal) Gastão Elias |
| 29 Apr | Portugal Open; Oeiras, Portugal; ATP World Tour 250; Clay (red) – €467,800 – 28S/32Q/16D; Singles – Doubles | (Mexico) Santiago González (United States) Scott Lipsky; 6–3, 4–6, [10–7] | (Pakistan) Aisam-ul-Haq Qureshi (Netherlands) Jean-Julien Rojer | (Italy) Andreas Seppi (Spain) Pablo Carreño Busta | (Romania) Victor Hănescu (Spain) Tommy Robredo (Italy) Fabio Fognini (Portugal) Gastão Elias |

=== May ===
| Week | Tournament | Champions | Runners-up | Semifinalists | Quarterfinalists |
|---|---|---|---|---|---|
| 6 May | Mutua Madrid Open; Madrid, Spain; ATP World Tour Masters 1000; Clay (red) – €3,368,265 – 56S/28Q/24D; Singles – Doubles | (Spain) Rafael Nadal; 6–2, 6–4 | (Switzerland) Stanislas Wawrinka | (Czech Republic) Tomáš Berdych (Spain) Pablo Andújar | (France) Jo-Wilfried Tsonga (United Kingdom) Andy Murray (Spain) David Ferrer (Japan) Kei Nishikori |
| 6 May | Mutua Madrid Open; Madrid, Spain; ATP World Tour Masters 1000; Clay (red) – €3,368,265 – 56S/28Q/24D; Singles – Doubles | (United States) Bob Bryan (United States) Mike Bryan; 6–2, 6–3 | (Austria) Alexander Peya (Brazil) Bruno Soares | (Czech Republic) Tomáš Berdych (Spain) Pablo Andújar | (France) Jo-Wilfried Tsonga (United Kingdom) Andy Murray (Spain) David Ferrer (Japan) Kei Nishikori |
| 13 May | Internazionali BNL d'Italia; Rome, Italy; ATP World Tour Masters 1000; Clay (red) – €2,646,495 – 56S/28Q/24D; Singles – Doubles | (Spain) Rafael Nadal; 6–1, 6–3 | (Switzerland) Roger Federer | (Czech Republic) Tomáš Berdych (France) Benoît Paire | (Serbia) Novak Djokovic (Spain) David Ferrer (Spain) Marcel Granollers (Poland) Jerzy Janowicz |
| 13 May | Internazionali BNL d'Italia; Rome, Italy; ATP World Tour Masters 1000; Clay (red) – €2,646,495 – 56S/28Q/24D; Singles – Doubles | (United States) Bob Bryan (United States) Mike Bryan; 6–2, 6–3 | (India) Mahesh Bhupathi (India) Rohan Bopanna | (Czech Republic) Tomáš Berdych (France) Benoît Paire | (Serbia) Novak Djokovic (Spain) David Ferrer (Spain) Marcel Granollers (Poland) Jerzy Janowicz |
| 20 May | Power Horse Cup; Düsseldorf, Germany; ATP World Tour 250; Clay (red) – €467,800 – 28S/32Q/16D; Singles – Doubles | (Argentina) Juan Mónaco; 6–4, 6–3 | (Finland) Jarkko Nieminen | (Argentina) Guido Pella (Netherlands) Igor Sijsling | (Serbia) Viktor Troicki (Germany) Tobias Kamke (Czech Republic) Jan Hájek (Germany) Tommy Haas |
| 20 May | Power Horse Cup; Düsseldorf, Germany; ATP World Tour 250; Clay (red) – €467,800 – 28S/32Q/16D; Singles – Doubles | (Germany) Andre Begemann (Germany) Martin Emmrich; 7–5, 6–2 | (Philippines) Treat Conrad Huey (United Kingdom) Dominic Inglot | (Argentina) Guido Pella (Netherlands) Igor Sijsling | (Serbia) Viktor Troicki (Germany) Tobias Kamke (Czech Republic) Jan Hájek (Germany) Tommy Haas |
| 20 May | Open de Nice Côte d'Azur; Nice, France; ATP World Tour 250; Clay (red) – €467,800 – 28S/32Q/16D; Singles – Doubles | (Spain) Albert Montañés; 6–0, 7–6^{(7–3)} | (France) Gaël Monfils | (France) Édouard Roger-Vasselin (Spain) Pablo Andújar | (France) Paul-Henri Mathieu (United States) Sam Querrey (Netherlands) Robin Haase (France) Gilles Simon |
| 20 May | Open de Nice Côte d'Azur; Nice, France; ATP World Tour 250; Clay (red) – €467,800 – 28S/32Q/16D; Singles – Doubles | (Sweden) Johan Brunström (South Africa) Raven Klaasen; 6–3, 6–2 | (Colombia) Robert Farah (Colombia) Juan Sebastián Cabal | (France) Édouard Roger-Vasselin (Spain) Pablo Andújar | (France) Paul-Henri Mathieu (United States) Sam Querrey (Netherlands) Robin Haase (France) Gilles Simon |
| 27 May; 3 Jun | French Open; Paris, France; Grand Slam; Clay (red) – €10,104,000; 128S/128Q/64D/32X; Singles – Doubles – Mixed doubles | (Spain) Rafael Nadal; 6–3, 6–2, 6–3 | (Spain) David Ferrer | (Serbia) Novak Djokovic (France) Jo-Wilfried Tsonga | (Germany) Tommy Haas (Switzerland) Stanislas Wawrinka (Spain) Tommy Robredo (Switzerland) Roger Federer |
| 27 May; 3 Jun | French Open; Paris, France; Grand Slam; Clay (red) – €10,104,000; 128S/128Q/64D/32X; Singles – Doubles – Mixed doubles | (United States) Bob Bryan (United States) Mike Bryan; 6–4, 4–6, 7–6^{(7–4)} | (France) Michaël Llodra (France) Nicolas Mahut | (Serbia) Novak Djokovic (France) Jo-Wilfried Tsonga | (Germany) Tommy Haas (Switzerland) Stanislas Wawrinka (Spain) Tommy Robredo (Switzerland) Roger Federer |
| 27 May; 3 Jun | French Open; Paris, France; Grand Slam; Clay (red) – €10,104,000; 128S/128Q/64D/32X; Singles – Doubles – Mixed doubles | (Czech Republic) Lucie Hradecká (Czech Republic) František Čermák; 1–6, 6–4, [10–5] | (France) Kristina Mladenovic (Canada) Daniel Nestor | (Serbia) Novak Djokovic (France) Jo-Wilfried Tsonga | (Germany) Tommy Haas (Switzerland) Stanislas Wawrinka (Spain) Tommy Robredo (Switzerland) Roger Federer |

=== June ===
| Week | Tournament | Champions | Runners-up | Semifinalists | Quarterfinalists |
|---|---|---|---|---|---|
| 10 Jun | Gerry Weber Open; Halle, Germany; ATP World Tour 250; Grass – €779,665 – 28S/32Q/16D; Singles – Doubles | (Switzerland) Roger Federer; 6–7^{(5–7)}, 6–3, 6–4 | (Russia) Mikhail Youzhny | (Germany) Tommy Haas (France) Richard Gasquet | (Germany) Mischa Zverev (France) Gaël Monfils (Germany) Philipp Kohlschreiber (Germany) Florian Mayer |
| 10 Jun | Gerry Weber Open; Halle, Germany; ATP World Tour 250; Grass – €779,665 – 28S/32Q/16D; Singles – Doubles | (Mexico) Santiago González (United States) Scott Lipsky; 6–2, 7–6^{(7–3)} | (Italy) Daniele Bracciali (Israel) Jonathan Erlich | (Germany) Tommy Haas (France) Richard Gasquet | (Germany) Mischa Zverev (France) Gaël Monfils (Germany) Philipp Kohlschreiber (Germany) Florian Mayer |
| 10 Jun | Aegon Championships; London, United Kingdom; ATP World Tour 250; Grass – €779,665 – 56S/32Q/24D; Singles – Doubles | (United Kingdom) Andy Murray; 5–7, 7–5, 6–3 | (Croatia) Marin Čilić | (France) Jo-Wilfried Tsonga (Australia) Lleyton Hewitt | (Germany) Benjamin Becker (United States) Denis Kudla (Argentina) Juan Martín del Potro (Czech Republic) Tomáš Berdych |
| 10 Jun | Aegon Championships; London, United Kingdom; ATP World Tour 250; Grass – €779,665 – 56S/32Q/24D; Singles – Doubles | (United States) Bob Bryan (United States) Mike Bryan; 4–6, 7–5, [10–3] | (Austria) Alexander Peya (Brazil) Bruno Soares | (France) Jo-Wilfried Tsonga (Australia) Lleyton Hewitt | (Germany) Benjamin Becker (United States) Denis Kudla (Argentina) Juan Martín del Potro (Czech Republic) Tomáš Berdych |
| 17 Jun | Topshelf Open 's-Hertogenbosch, Netherlands; ATP World Tour 250; Grass – €467,800 – 32S/32Q/16D; Singles – Doubles | (France) Nicolas Mahut; 6–3, 6–4 | (Switzerland) Stanislas Wawrinka | (Belgium) Xavier Malisse (Spain) Guillermo García López | (Spain) Roberto Bautista Agut (Russia) Evgeny Donskoy (Czech Republic) Jan Hernych (France) Jérémy Chardy |
| 17 Jun | Topshelf Open 's-Hertogenbosch, Netherlands; ATP World Tour 250; Grass – €467,800 – 32S/32Q/16D; Singles – Doubles | (Belarus) Max Mirnyi (Romania) Horia Tecău; 6–3, 7–6^{(7–4)} | (Germany) Andre Begemann (Germany) Martin Emmrich | (Belgium) Xavier Malisse (Spain) Guillermo García López | (Spain) Roberto Bautista Agut (Russia) Evgeny Donskoy (Czech Republic) Jan Hernych (France) Jérémy Chardy |
| 17 Jun | Aegon International; Eastbourne, United Kingdom; ATP World Tour 250; Grass – €519,310 – 28S/32Q/16D; Singles – Doubles | (Spain) Feliciano López; 7–6^{(7–2)}, 6–7^{(5–7)}, 6–0 | (France) Gilles Simon | (Croatia) Ivan Dodig (Italy) Andreas Seppi | (Italy) Fabio Fognini (Spain) Fernando Verdasco (Czech Republic) Radek Štěpánek (Australia) Bernard Tomic |
| 17 Jun | Aegon International; Eastbourne, United Kingdom; ATP World Tour 250; Grass – €519,310 – 28S/32Q/16D; Singles – Doubles | (Austria) Alexander Peya (Brazil) Bruno Soares; 3–6, 6–3, [10–8] | (United Kingdom) Colin Fleming (United Kingdom) Jonathan Marray | (Croatia) Ivan Dodig (Italy) Andreas Seppi | (Italy) Fabio Fognini (Spain) Fernando Verdasco (Czech Republic) Radek Štěpánek (Australia) Bernard Tomic |
| 24 Jun; 1 Jul | The Championships, Wimbledon; London, United Kingdom; Grand Slam; Grass – £10,514,000; 128S/128Q/64D/16Q/48X; Singles – Doubles – Mixed doubles | (United Kingdom) Andy Murray; 6–4, 7–5, 6–4 | (Serbia) Novak Djokovic | (Argentina) Juan Martín del Potro (Poland) Jerzy Janowicz | (Czech Republic) Tomáš Berdych (Spain) David Ferrer (Poland) Łukasz Kubot (Spain) Fernando Verdasco |
| 24 Jun; 1 Jul | The Championships, Wimbledon; London, United Kingdom; Grand Slam; Grass – £10,514,000; 128S/128Q/64D/16Q/48X; Singles – Doubles – Mixed doubles | (United States) Bob Bryan (United States) Mike Bryan; 3–6, 6–3, 6–4, 6–4 | (Croatia) Ivan Dodig (Brazil) Marcelo Melo | (Argentina) Juan Martín del Potro (Poland) Jerzy Janowicz | (Czech Republic) Tomáš Berdych (Spain) David Ferrer (Poland) Łukasz Kubot (Spain) Fernando Verdasco |
| 24 Jun; 1 Jul | The Championships, Wimbledon; London, United Kingdom; Grand Slam; Grass – £10,514,000; 128S/128Q/64D/16Q/48X; Singles – Doubles – Mixed doubles | (Canada) Daniel Nestor (France) Kristina Mladenovic; 5–7, 6–2, 8–6 | (Brazil) Bruno Soares (United States) Lisa Raymond | (Argentina) Juan Martín del Potro (Poland) Jerzy Janowicz | (Czech Republic) Tomáš Berdych (Spain) David Ferrer (Poland) Łukasz Kubot (Spain) Fernando Verdasco |

=== July ===
| Week | Tournament | Champions | Runners-up | Semifinalists | Quarterfinalists |
|---|---|---|---|---|---|
| 8 Jul | Hall of Fame Tennis Championships; Newport, United States; ATP World Tour 250; Grass – $519,775 – 32S/24Q/16D; Singles – Doubles | (France) Nicolas Mahut; 5–7, 7–5, 6–3 | (Australia) Lleyton Hewitt | (United States) Michael Russell (United States) John Isner | (Poland) Michał Przysiężny (Netherlands) Igor Sijsling (Czech Republic) Jan Hernych (Croatia) Ivo Karlović |
| 8 Jul | Hall of Fame Tennis Championships; Newport, United States; ATP World Tour 250; Grass – $519,775 – 32S/24Q/16D; Singles – Doubles | (France) Nicolas Mahut (France) Édouard Roger-Vasselin; 6–7^{(4–7)}, 6–2, [10–5] | (United States) Tim Smyczek (United States) Rhyne Williams | (United States) Michael Russell (United States) John Isner | (Poland) Michał Przysiężny (Netherlands) Igor Sijsling (Czech Republic) Jan Hernych (Croatia) Ivo Karlović |
| 8 Jul | MercedesCup; Stuttgart, Germany; ATP World Tour 250; Clay (red) – €467,800 – 28S/32Q/16D; Singles – Doubles | (Italy) Fabio Fognini; 5–7, 6–4, 6–4 | (Germany) Philipp Kohlschreiber | (Spain) Roberto Bautista Agut (Romania) Victor Hănescu | (Germany) Tommy Haas (Germany) Michael Berrer (France) Benoît Paire (France) Gaël Monfils |
| 8 Jul | MercedesCup; Stuttgart, Germany; ATP World Tour 250; Clay (red) – €467,800 – 28S/32Q/16D; Singles – Doubles | (Argentina) Facundo Bagnis (Brazil) Thomaz Bellucci; 2–6, 6–4, [11–9] | (Poland) Tomasz Bednarek (Poland) Mateusz Kowalczyk | (Spain) Roberto Bautista Agut (Romania) Victor Hănescu | (Germany) Tommy Haas (Germany) Michael Berrer (France) Benoît Paire (France) Gaël Monfils |
| 8 Jul | Swedish Open; Båstad, Sweden; ATP World Tour 250; Clay (red) – €491,370 – 28S/32Q/16D; Singles – Doubles | (Argentina) Carlos Berlocq; 7–5, 6–1 | (Spain) Fernando Verdasco | (Netherlands) Thiemo de Bakker (Bulgaria) Grigor Dimitrov | (Czech Republic) Tomáš Berdych (Spain) Albert Ramos (Argentina) Juan Mónaco (Spain) Nicolás Almagro |
| 8 Jul | Swedish Open; Båstad, Sweden; ATP World Tour 250; Clay (red) – €491,370 – 28S/32Q/16D; Singles – Doubles | (United States) Nicholas Monroe (Germany) Simon Stadler; 6–2, 3–6, [10–3] | (Argentina) Carlos Berlocq (Spain) Albert Ramos | (Netherlands) Thiemo de Bakker (Bulgaria) Grigor Dimitrov | (Czech Republic) Tomáš Berdych (Spain) Albert Ramos (Argentina) Juan Mónaco (Spain) Nicolás Almagro |
| 15 Jul | International German Open; Hamburg, Germany; ATP World Tour 500; Clay (red) – €1,230,500 – 48S/24Q/16D; Singles – Doubles | (Italy) Fabio Fognini; 4–6, 7–6^{(10–8)}, 6–2 | (Argentina) Federico Delbonis | (Switzerland) Roger Federer (Spain) Nicolás Almagro | (Germany) Florian Mayer (Spain) Fernando Verdasco (Argentina) Juan Mónaco (Germany) Tommy Haas |
| 15 Jul | International German Open; Hamburg, Germany; ATP World Tour 500; Clay (red) – €1,230,500 – 48S/24Q/16D; Singles – Doubles | (Poland) Mariusz Fyrstenberg (Poland) Marcin Matkowski; 3–6, 6–1, [10–8] | (Austria) Alexander Peya (Brazil) Bruno Soares | (Switzerland) Roger Federer (Spain) Nicolás Almagro | (Germany) Florian Mayer (Spain) Fernando Verdasco (Argentina) Juan Mónaco (Germany) Tommy Haas |
| 15 Jul | Claro Open Colombia; Bogotá, Colombia; ATP World Tour 250; Hard – $727,685 – 28S/32Q/16D; Singles – Doubles | (Croatia) Ivo Karlović; 6–3, 7–6^{(7–4)} | (Colombia) Alejandro Falla | (Canada) Vasek Pospisil (South Africa) Kevin Anderson | (Serbia) Janko Tipsarević (Italy) Matteo Viola (France) Adrian Mannarino (Colombia) Santiago Giraldo |
| 15 Jul | Claro Open Colombia; Bogotá, Colombia; ATP World Tour 250; Hard – $727,685 – 28S/32Q/16D; Singles – Doubles | (India) Purav Raja (India) Divij Sharan; 7–6^{(7–4)}, 7–6^{(7–3)} | (France) Édouard Roger-Vasselin (Netherlands) Igor Sijsling | (Canada) Vasek Pospisil (South Africa) Kevin Anderson | (Serbia) Janko Tipsarević (Italy) Matteo Viola (France) Adrian Mannarino (Colombia) Santiago Giraldo |
| 22 Jul | BB&T Atlanta Open; Atlanta, United States; ATP World Tour 250; Hard – $623,730 – 28S/32Q/16D; Singles – Doubles | (United States) John Isner; 6–7^{(3–7)}, 7–6^{(7–2)}, 7–6^{(7–2)} | (South Africa) Kevin Anderson | (Australia) Lleyton Hewitt (United States) Ryan Harrison | (United States) James Blake (Croatia) Ivan Dodig (Colombia) Santiago Giraldo (Uzbekistan) Denis Istomin |
| 22 Jul | BB&T Atlanta Open; Atlanta, United States; ATP World Tour 250; Hard – $623,730 – 28S/32Q/16D; Singles – Doubles | (France) Édouard Roger-Vasselin (Netherlands) Igor Sijsling; 7–6^{(8–6)}, 6–3 | (United Kingdom) Colin Fleming (United Kingdom) Jonathan Marray | (Australia) Lleyton Hewitt (United States) Ryan Harrison | (United States) James Blake (Croatia) Ivan Dodig (Colombia) Santiago Giraldo (Uzbekistan) Denis Istomin |
| 22 Jul | Crédit Agricole Suisse Open Gstaad; Gstaad, Switzerland; ATP World Tour 250; Clay (red) – €467,800 – 28S/32Q/16D; Singles – Doubles | (Russia) Mikhail Youzhny; 6–3, 6–4 | (Netherlands) Robin Haase | (Romania) Victor Hănescu (Spain) Feliciano López | (Germany) Daniel Brands (Argentina) Juan Mónaco (Spain) Marcel Granollers (Switzerland) Stanislas Wawrinka |
| 22 Jul | Crédit Agricole Suisse Open Gstaad; Gstaad, Switzerland; ATP World Tour 250; Clay (red) – €467,800 – 28S/32Q/16D; Singles – Doubles | (United Kingdom) Jamie Murray (Australia) John Peers; 6–3, 6–4 | (Spain) Pablo Andújar (Spain) Guillermo García López | (Romania) Victor Hănescu (Spain) Feliciano López | (Germany) Daniel Brands (Argentina) Juan Mónaco (Spain) Marcel Granollers (Switzerland) Stanislas Wawrinka |
| 22 Jul | ATP Vegeta Croatia Open Umag; Umag, Croatia; ATP World Tour 250; Clay (red) – €467,800 – 28S/32Q/16D; Singles – Doubles | (Spain) Tommy Robredo; 6–0, 6–3 | (Italy) Fabio Fognini | (France) Gaël Monfils (Italy) Andreas Seppi | (Spain) Albert Montañés (Slovakia) Martin Kližan (Slovenia) Aljaž Bedene (Argentina) Horacio Zeballos |
| 22 Jul | ATP Vegeta Croatia Open Umag; Umag, Croatia; ATP World Tour 250; Clay (red) – €467,800 – 28S/32Q/16D; Singles – Doubles | (Slovakia) Martin Kližan (Spain) David Marrero; 6–1, 5–7, [10–7] | (United States) Nicholas Monroe (Germany) Simon Stadler | (France) Gaël Monfils (Italy) Andreas Seppi | (Spain) Albert Montañés (Slovakia) Martin Kližan (Slovenia) Aljaž Bedene (Argentina) Horacio Zeballos |
| 29 Jul | Citi Open; Washington, D.C., United States; ATP World Tour 500; Hard – $1,546,590 – 48S/24Q/16D; Singles – Doubles | (Argentina) Juan Martín del Potro; 3–6, 6–1, 6–2 | (United States) John Isner | (Germany) Tommy Haas (Russia) Dmitry Tursunov | (South Africa) Kevin Anderson (Bulgaria) Grigor Dimitrov (Australia) Marinko Matosevic (Cyprus) Marcos Baghdatis |
| 29 Jul | Citi Open; Washington, D.C., United States; ATP World Tour 500; Hard – $1,546,590 – 48S/24Q/16D; Singles – Doubles | (France) Julien Benneteau (Serbia) Nenad Zimonjić; 7–6^{(7–5)}, 7–5 | (United States) Mardy Fish (Czech Republic) Radek Štěpánek | (Germany) Tommy Haas (Russia) Dmitry Tursunov | (South Africa) Kevin Anderson (Bulgaria) Grigor Dimitrov (Australia) Marinko Matosevic (Cyprus) Marcos Baghdatis |
| 29 Jul | bet-at-home Cup; Kitzbühel, Austria; ATP World Tour 250; Clay (red) – €467,800 – 28S/26Q/16D; Singles – Doubles | (Spain) Marcel Granollers; 0–6, 7–6^{(7–3)}, 6–4 | (Argentina) Juan Mónaco | (Netherlands) Robin Haase (Spain) Albert Montañés | (Argentina) Leonardo Mayer (Spain) Fernando Verdasco (Austria) Dominic Thiem (Spain) Daniel Gimeno Traver |
| 29 Jul | bet-at-home Cup; Kitzbühel, Austria; ATP World Tour 250; Clay (red) – €467,800 – 28S/26Q/16D; Singles – Doubles | (Germany) Martin Emmrich (Germany) Christopher Kas; 6–4, 6–3 | (Czech Republic) František Čermák (Czech Republic) Lukáš Dlouhý | (Netherlands) Robin Haase (Spain) Albert Montañés | (Argentina) Leonardo Mayer (Spain) Fernando Verdasco (Austria) Dominic Thiem (Spain) Daniel Gimeno Traver |

=== August ===
| Week | Tournament | Champions | Runners-up | Semifinalists | Quarterfinalists |
|---|---|---|---|---|---|
| 5 Aug | Rogers Cup; Montreal, Canada; ATP World Tour Masters 1000; Hard – $2,887,085 – 56S/28Q/24D; Singles – Doubles | (Spain) Rafael Nadal; 6–2, 6–2 | (Canada) Milos Raonic | (Serbia) Novak Djokovic (Canada) Vasek Pospisil | (France) Richard Gasquet (Australia) Marinko Matosevic (Russia) Nikolay Davydenko (Latvia) Ernests Gulbis |
| 5 Aug | Rogers Cup; Montreal, Canada; ATP World Tour Masters 1000; Hard – $2,887,085 – 56S/28Q/24D; Singles – Doubles | (Austria) Alexander Peya (Brazil) Bruno Soares; 6–4, 7–6^{(7–4)} | (United Kingdom) Colin Fleming (United Kingdom) Andy Murray | (Serbia) Novak Djokovic (Canada) Vasek Pospisil | (France) Richard Gasquet (Australia) Marinko Matosevic (Russia) Nikolay Davydenko (Latvia) Ernests Gulbis |
| 12 Aug | Western & Southern Open; Mason, United States; ATP World Tour Masters 1000; Hard – $3,079,555 – 56S/28Q/24D; Singles – Doubles | (Spain) Rafael Nadal; 7–6^{(10–8)}, 7–6^{(7–3)} | (United States) John Isner | (Argentina) Juan Martín del Potro (Czech Republic) Tomáš Berdych | (Serbia) Novak Djokovic (Russia) Dmitry Tursunov (Switzerland) Roger Federer (United Kingdom) Andy Murray |
| 12 Aug | Western & Southern Open; Mason, United States; ATP World Tour Masters 1000; Hard – $3,079,555 – 56S/28Q/24D; Singles – Doubles | (United States) Bob Bryan (United States) Mike Bryan; 6–4, 4–6, [10–4] | (Spain) Marcel Granollers (Spain) Marc López | (Argentina) Juan Martín del Potro (Czech Republic) Tomáš Berdych | (Serbia) Novak Djokovic (Russia) Dmitry Tursunov (Switzerland) Roger Federer (United Kingdom) Andy Murray |
| 19 Aug | Winston-Salem Open; Winston-Salem, United States; ATP World Tour 250; Hard – $658,450 – 48S/32Q/16D; Singles – Doubles | (Austria) Jürgen Melzer; 6–3, 2–1 retired | (France) Gaël Monfils | (United States) Sam Querrey (Ukraine) Alexandr Dolgopolov | (Lithuania) Ričardas Berankis (Russia) Dmitry Tursunov (Spain) Fernando Verdasco (Chinese Taipei) Lu Yen-hsun |
| 19 Aug | Winston-Salem Open; Winston-Salem, United States; ATP World Tour 250; Hard – $658,450 – 48S/32Q/16D; Singles – Doubles | (Canada) Daniel Nestor (India) Leander Paes; 7–6^{(12–10)}, 7–5 | (Philippines) Treat Huey (United Kingdom) Dominic Inglot | (United States) Sam Querrey (Ukraine) Alexandr Dolgopolov | (Lithuania) Ričardas Berankis (Russia) Dmitry Tursunov (Spain) Fernando Verdasco (Chinese Taipei) Lu Yen-hsun |
| 26 Aug; 2 Sep | US Open; New York City, United States; Grand Slam; Hard – $15,852,000; 128S/128Q/64D/32X; Singles – Doubles – Mixed doubles | (Spain) Rafael Nadal; 6–2, 3–6, 6–4, 6–1 | (Serbia) Novak Djokovic | (Switzerland) Stanislas Wawrinka (France) Richard Gasquet | (Russia) Mikhail Youzhny (United Kingdom) Andy Murray (Spain) David Ferrer (Spain) Tommy Robredo |
| 26 Aug; 2 Sep | US Open; New York City, United States; Grand Slam; Hard – $15,852,000; 128S/128Q/64D/32X; Singles – Doubles – Mixed doubles | (India) Leander Paes (Czech Republic) Radek Štěpánek; 6–1, 6–3 | (Austria) Alexander Peya (Brazil) Bruno Soares | (Switzerland) Stanislas Wawrinka (France) Richard Gasquet | (Russia) Mikhail Youzhny (United Kingdom) Andy Murray (Spain) David Ferrer (Spain) Tommy Robredo |
| 26 Aug; 2 Sep | US Open; New York City, United States; Grand Slam; Hard – $15,852,000; 128S/128Q/64D/32X; Singles – Doubles – Mixed doubles | (Czech Republic) Andrea Hlaváčková (Belarus) Max Mirnyi; 7–6^{(7–5)}, 6–3 | (United States) Abigail Spears (Mexico) Santiago González | (Switzerland) Stanislas Wawrinka (France) Richard Gasquet | (Russia) Mikhail Youzhny (United Kingdom) Andy Murray (Spain) David Ferrer (Spain) Tommy Robredo |

=== September ===
| Week | Tournament | Champions | Runners-up | Semifinalists | Quarterfinalists |
|---|---|---|---|---|---|
| 9 Sep | Davis Cup Semifinals; Belgrade, Serbia – clay (red) (i); Prague, Czech Republic – hard (i) | Semifinals winners Serbia 3–2; Czech Republic 3–2 | Semifinals losers Canada; Argentina | | |
| 16 Sep | Moselle Open; Metz, France; ATP World Tour 250; Hard (i) – €467,800 – 28S/32Q/16D; Singles – Doubles | (France) Gilles Simon; 6–4, 6–3 | (France) Jo-Wilfried Tsonga | (Germany) Florian Mayer (France) Nicolas Mahut | (Germany) Tobias Kamke (Argentina) Carlos Berlocq (Germany) Benjamin Becker (United States) Sam Querrey |
| 16 Sep | Moselle Open; Metz, France; ATP World Tour 250; Hard (i) – €467,800 – 28S/32Q/16D; Singles – Doubles | (Sweden) Johan Brunström (South Africa) Raven Klaasen; 6–4, 7–6^{(7–5)} | (France) Nicolas Mahut (France) Jo-Wilfried Tsonga | (Germany) Florian Mayer (France) Nicolas Mahut | (Germany) Tobias Kamke (Argentina) Carlos Berlocq (Germany) Benjamin Becker (United States) Sam Querrey |
| 16 Sep | St. Petersburg Open; Saint Petersburg, Russia; ATP World Tour 250; Hard (i) – $519,775 – 32S/32Q/16D; Singles – Doubles | (Latvia) Ernests Gulbis; 3–6, 6–4, 6–0 | (Spain) Guillermo García López | (Poland) Michał Przysiężny (Portugal) João Sousa | (Czech Republic) Lukáš Rosol (Spain) Roberto Bautista Agut (Russia) Dmitry Tursunov (Uzbekistan) Denis Istomin |
| 16 Sep | St. Petersburg Open; Saint Petersburg, Russia; ATP World Tour 250; Hard (i) – $519,775 – 32S/32Q/16D; Singles – Doubles | (Spain) David Marrero (Spain) Fernando Verdasco; 7–6^{(8–6)}, 6–3 | (United Kingdom) Dominic Inglot (Uzbekistan) Denis Istomin | (Poland) Michał Przysiężny (Portugal) João Sousa | (Czech Republic) Lukáš Rosol (Spain) Roberto Bautista Agut (Russia) Dmitry Tursunov (Uzbekistan) Denis Istomin |
| 23 Sep | PTT Thailand Open; Bangkok, Thailand; ATP World Tour 250; Hard (i) – $631,530 – 28S/32Q/16D; Singles – Doubles | (Canada) Milos Raonic; 7–6^{(7–4)}, 6–3 | (Czech Republic) Tomáš Berdych | (France) Gilles Simon (France) Richard Gasquet | (Chinese Taipei) Lu Yen-hsun (Netherlands) Igor Sijsling (Spain) Feliciano López (Russia) Mikhail Youzhny |
| 23 Sep | PTT Thailand Open; Bangkok, Thailand; ATP World Tour 250; Hard (i) – $631,530 – 28S/32Q/16D; Singles – Doubles | (United Kingdom) Jamie Murray (Australia) John Peers; 6–3, 3–6, [10–6] | (Poland) Tomasz Bednarek (Sweden) Johan Brunström | (France) Gilles Simon (France) Richard Gasquet | (Chinese Taipei) Lu Yen-hsun (Netherlands) Igor Sijsling (Spain) Feliciano López (Russia) Mikhail Youzhny |
| 23 Sep | Malaysian Open; Kuala Lumpur, Malaysia; ATP World Tour 250; Hard (i) – $984,300 – 28S/16Q/16D; Singles – Doubles | (Portugal) João Sousa; 2–6, 7–5, 6–4 | (France) Julien Benneteau | (Austria) Jürgen Melzer (Switzerland) Stanislas Wawrinka | (Spain) David Ferrer (Argentina) Federico Delbonis (France) Adrian Mannarino (Russia) Dmitry Tursunov |
| 23 Sep | Malaysian Open; Kuala Lumpur, Malaysia; ATP World Tour 250; Hard (i) – $984,300 – 28S/16Q/16D; Singles – Doubles | (United States) Eric Butorac (South Africa) Raven Klaasen; 6–2, 6–4 | (Uruguay) Pablo Cuevas (Argentina) Horacio Zeballos | (Austria) Jürgen Melzer (Switzerland) Stanislas Wawrinka | (Spain) David Ferrer (Argentina) Federico Delbonis (France) Adrian Mannarino (Russia) Dmitry Tursunov |
| 30 Sep | China Open; Beijing, China; ATP World Tour 500; Hard – $3,566,050 – 32S/16Q/16D; Singles – Doubles | (Serbia) Novak Djokovic; 6–3, 6–4 | (Spain) Rafael Nadal | (France) Richard Gasquet (Czech Republic) Tomáš Berdych | (United States) Sam Querrey (Spain) David Ferrer (United States) John Isner (Italy) Fabio Fognini |
| 30 Sep | China Open; Beijing, China; ATP World Tour 500; Hard – $3,566,050 – 32S/16Q/16D; Singles – Doubles | (Belarus) Max Mirnyi (Romania) Horia Tecău; 6–4, 6–2 | (Italy) Fabio Fognini (Italy) Andreas Seppi | (France) Richard Gasquet (Czech Republic) Tomáš Berdych | (United States) Sam Querrey (Spain) David Ferrer (United States) John Isner (Italy) Fabio Fognini |
| 30 Sep | Rakuten Japan Open Tennis Championships; Tokyo, Japan; ATP World Tour 500; Hard – $1,437,800 – 32S/16Q/16D; Singles – Doubles | (Argentina) Juan Martín del Potro; 7–6^{(7–5)}, 7–5 | (Canada) Milos Raonic | (Spain) Nicolás Almagro (Croatia) Ivan Dodig | (Ukraine) Alexandr Dolgopolov (Japan) Kei Nishikori (Slovakia) Lukáš Lacko (Finland) Jarkko Nieminen |
| 30 Sep | Rakuten Japan Open Tennis Championships; Tokyo, Japan; ATP World Tour 500; Hard – $1,437,800 – 32S/16Q/16D; Singles – Doubles | (India) Rohan Bopanna (France) Édouard Roger-Vasselin; 7–6^{(7–5)}, 6–4 | (United Kingdom) Jamie Murray (Australia) John Peers | (Spain) Nicolás Almagro (Croatia) Ivan Dodig | (Ukraine) Alexandr Dolgopolov (Japan) Kei Nishikori (Slovakia) Lukáš Lacko (Finland) Jarkko Nieminen |

=== October ===
| Week | Tournament | Champions | Runners-up | Semifinalists | Quarterfinalists |
|---|---|---|---|---|---|
| 7 Oct | Shanghai Rolex Masters; Shanghai, China; ATP World Tour Masters 1000; Hard – $3,849,445 – 56S/28Q/24D; Singles – Doubles | (Serbia) Novak Djokovic; 6–1, 3–6, 7–6^{(7–3)} | (Argentina) Juan Martín del Potro | (France) Jo-Wilfried Tsonga (Spain) Rafael Nadal | (France) Gaël Monfils (Germany) Florian Mayer (Spain) Nicolás Almagro (Switzerland) Stanislas Wawrinka |
| 7 Oct | Shanghai Rolex Masters; Shanghai, China; ATP World Tour Masters 1000; Hard – $3,849,445 – 56S/28Q/24D; Singles – Doubles | (Croatia) Ivan Dodig (Brazil) Marcelo Melo; 7–6^{(7–2)}, 6–7^{(6–8)}, [10–2] | (Spain) David Marrero (Spain) Fernando Verdasco | (France) Jo-Wilfried Tsonga (Spain) Rafael Nadal | (France) Gaël Monfils (Germany) Florian Mayer (Spain) Nicolás Almagro (Switzerland) Stanislas Wawrinka |
| 14 Oct | Kremlin Cup; Moscow, Russia; ATP World Tour 250; Hard (i) – $823,550 – 28S/32Q/16D; Singles – Doubles | (France) Richard Gasquet; 4–6, 6–4, 6–4 | (Kazakhstan) Mikhail Kukushkin | (Croatia) Ivo Karlović (Italy) Andreas Seppi | (Russia) Teymuraz Gabashvili (Russia) Karen Khachanov (Kazakhstan) Andrey Golubev (France) Édouard Roger-Vasselin |
| 14 Oct | Kremlin Cup; Moscow, Russia; ATP World Tour 250; Hard (i) – $823,550 – 28S/32Q/16D; Singles – Doubles | (Russia) Mikhail Elgin (Uzbekistan) Denis Istomin; 6–2, 1–6, [14–12] | (United Kingdom) Ken Skupski (United Kingdom) Neal Skupski | (Croatia) Ivo Karlović (Italy) Andreas Seppi | (Russia) Teymuraz Gabashvili (Russia) Karen Khachanov (Kazakhstan) Andrey Golubev (France) Édouard Roger-Vasselin |
| 14 Oct | If Stockholm Open; Stockholm, Sweden; ATP World Tour 250; Hard (i) – €600,565 – 28S/32Q/16D; Singles – Doubles | (Bulgaria) Grigor Dimitrov; 2–6, 6–3, 6–4 | (Spain) David Ferrer | (Latvia) Ernests Gulbis (France) Benoît Paire | (Spain) Fernando Verdasco (Poland) Jerzy Janowicz (France) Kenny de Schepper (Canada) Milos Raonic |
| 14 Oct | If Stockholm Open; Stockholm, Sweden; ATP World Tour 250; Hard (i) – €600,565 – 28S/32Q/16D; Singles – Doubles | (Pakistan) Aisam-ul-Haq Qureshi (Netherlands) Jean-Julien Rojer; 6–2, 6–2 | (Sweden) Jonas Björkman (Sweden) Robert Lindstedt | (Latvia) Ernests Gulbis (France) Benoît Paire | (Spain) Fernando Verdasco (Poland) Jerzy Janowicz (France) Kenny de Schepper (Canada) Milos Raonic |
| 14 Oct | Erste Bank Open; Vienna, Austria; ATP World Tour 250; Hard (i) – €571,775 – 28S/32Q/16D; Singles – Doubles | (Germany) Tommy Haas; 6–3, 4–6, 6–4 | (Netherlands) Robin Haase | (France) Jo-Wilfried Tsonga (Czech Republic) Lukáš Rosol | (Austria) Dominic Thiem (Italy) Fabio Fognini (Belgium) Ruben Bemelmans (Czech Republic) Radek Štěpánek |
| 14 Oct | Erste Bank Open; Vienna, Austria; ATP World Tour 250; Hard (i) – €571,775 – 28S/32Q/16D; Singles – Doubles | (Romania) Florin Mergea (Czech Republic) Lukáš Rosol; 7–5, 6–4 | (Canada) Daniel Nestor (Austria) Julian Knowle | (France) Jo-Wilfried Tsonga (Czech Republic) Lukáš Rosol | (Austria) Dominic Thiem (Italy) Fabio Fognini (Belgium) Ruben Bemelmans (Czech Republic) Radek Štěpánek |
| 21 Oct | Valencia Open 500; Valencia, Spain; ATP World Tour 500; Hard (i) – €2,171,095 – 32S/16Q/16D; Singles – Doubles | (Russia) Mikhail Youzhny; 6–3, 7–5 | (Spain) David Ferrer | (Spain) Nicolás Almagro (Russia) Dmitry Tursunov | (Poland) Jerzy Janowicz (Italy) Fabio Fognini (France) Jérémy Chardy (Finland) Jarkko Nieminen |
| 21 Oct | Valencia Open 500; Valencia, Spain; ATP World Tour 500; Hard (i) – €2,171,095 – 32S/16Q/16D; Singles – Doubles | (Austria) Alexander Peya (Brazil) Bruno Soares; 7–6^{(7–3)}, 6–7^{(1–6)}, [13–11] | (United States) Bob Bryan (United States) Mike Bryan | (Spain) Nicolás Almagro (Russia) Dmitry Tursunov | (Poland) Jerzy Janowicz (Italy) Fabio Fognini (France) Jérémy Chardy (Finland) Jarkko Nieminen |
| 21 Oct | Swiss Indoors; Basel, Switzerland; ATP World Tour 500; Hard (i) – €1,988,835 – 32S/16Q/16D; Singles – Doubles | (Argentina) Juan Martín del Potro; 7–6^{(7–3)}, 2–6, 6–4 | (Switzerland) Roger Federer | (France) Édouard Roger-Vasselin (Canada) Vasek Pospisil | (France) Paul-Henri Mathieu (Germany) Daniel Brands (Bulgaria) Grigor Dimitrov (Croatia) Ivan Dodig |
| 21 Oct | Swiss Indoors; Basel, Switzerland; ATP World Tour 500; Hard (i) – €1,988,835 – 32S/16Q/16D; Singles – Doubles | (Philippines) Treat Conrad Huey (United Kingdom) Dominic Inglot; 6–3, 3–6, [10–4] | (Austria) Julian Knowle (Austria) Oliver Marach | (France) Édouard Roger-Vasselin (Canada) Vasek Pospisil | (France) Paul-Henri Mathieu (Germany) Daniel Brands (Bulgaria) Grigor Dimitrov (Croatia) Ivan Dodig |
| 28 Oct | BNP Paribas Masters; Paris, France; ATP World Tour Masters 1000; Hard (i) – €3,204,745 – 48S/24Q/24D; Singles – Doubles | (Serbia) Novak Djokovic; 7–5, 7–5 | (Spain) David Ferrer | (Spain) Rafael Nadal (Switzerland) Roger Federer | (France) Richard Gasquet (Czech Republic) Tomáš Berdych (Argentina) Juan Martín del Potro (Switzerland) Stanislas Wawrinka |
| 28 Oct | BNP Paribas Masters; Paris, France; ATP World Tour Masters 1000; Hard (i) – €3,204,745 – 48S/24Q/24D; Singles – Doubles | (United States) Bob Bryan (United States) Mike Bryan; 6–3, 6–3 | (Austria) Alexander Peya (Brazil) Bruno Soares | (Spain) Rafael Nadal (Switzerland) Roger Federer | (France) Richard Gasquet (Czech Republic) Tomáš Berdych (Argentina) Juan Martín del Potro (Switzerland) Stanislas Wawrinka |

=== November ===
| Week | Tournament | Champions | Runners-up | Semifinalists | Quarterfinalists |
|---|---|---|---|---|---|
| 4 Nov | ATP World Tour Finals; London, United Kingdom; ATP World Tour Finals; Hard (i) – $6,000,000 – 8S/8D (RR); Singles – Doubles | (Serbia) Novak Djokovic; 6–3, 6–4 | (Spain) Rafael Nadal | (Switzerland) Roger Federer (Switzerland) Stanislas Wawrinka | Round robin (Czech Republic) Tomáš Berdych (Spain) David Ferrer (Argentina) Juan Martín del Potro (France) Richard Gasquet |
| 4 Nov | ATP World Tour Finals; London, United Kingdom; ATP World Tour Finals; Hard (i) – $6,000,000 – 8S/8D (RR); Singles – Doubles | (Spain) David Marrero (Spain) Fernando Verdasco; 7–5, 6–7^{(3–7)}, [10–7] | (United States) Bob Bryan (United States) Mike Bryan | (Switzerland) Roger Federer (Switzerland) Stanislas Wawrinka | Round robin (Czech Republic) Tomáš Berdych (Spain) David Ferrer (Argentina) Juan Martín del Potro (France) Richard Gasquet |
| 11 Nov | Davis Cup Final; Belgrade, Serbia – hard (i) | Czech Republic; 3–2 | Serbia | | |

== Statistical information ==
These tables present the number of singles (S), doubles (D), and mixed doubles (X) titles won by each player and each nation during the season, within all the tournament categories of the 2013 ATP World Tour: the Grand Slam tournaments, the ATP World Tour Finals, the ATP World Tour Masters 1000, the ATP World Tour 500 series, and the ATP World Tour 250 series. The players/nations are sorted by:

1. Total number of titles (a doubles title won by two players representing the same nation counts as only one win for the nation);
2. Cumulated importance of those titles (one Grand Slam win equalling two Masters 1000 wins, one ATP World Tour Finals win equalling one-and-a-half Masters 1000 win, one Masters 1000 win equalling two 500 events wins, one 500 event win equalling two 250 events wins);
3. A singles, doubles, mixed-doubles hierarchy;
4. Alphabetical order (by family names for players).

=== Key ===
Grand Slam
ATP World Tour Finals
ATP World Tour Masters 1000
ATP World Tour 500
ATP World Tour 250

=== Titles won by player ===
| Total | Player | Grand Slam | | | ATP Finals | | Masters 1000 | | Tour 500 | | Tour 250 | | Total | | |
| Total | Player | S | D | X | S | D | S | D | S | D | S | D | S | D | X |
|---|---|---|---|---|---|---|---|---|---|---|---|---|---|---|---|
| 11 | Bob Bryan (USA) | | ● ● ● | | | | | ● ● ● ● ● | | ● | | ● ● | 0 | 11 | 0 |
| 11 | Mike Bryan (USA) | | ● ● ● | | | | | ● ● ● ● ● | | ● | | ● ● | 0 | 11 | 0 |
| 10 | Rafael Nadal (ESP) | ● ● | | | | | ● ● ● ● ● | | ● ● | | ● | | 10 | 0 | 0 |
| 7 | Novak Djokovic (SRB) | ● | | | ● | | ● ● ● | | ● ● | | | | 7 | 0 | 0 |
| 6 | Bruno Soares (BRA) | | | | | | | ● | | ● ● | | ● ● ● | 0 | 6 | 0 |
| 5 | Alexander Peya (AUT) | | | | | | | ● | | ● ● | | ● ● | 0 | 5 | 0 |
| 4 | Andy Murray (GBR) | ● | | | | | ● | | | | ● ● | | 4 | 0 | 0 |
| 4 | Max Mirnyi (BLR) | | | ● | | | | | | ● | | ● ● | 0 | 3 | 1 |
| 4 | David Marrero (ESP) | | | | | ● | | | | ● | | ● ● | 0 | 4 | 0 |
| 4 | Juan Martín del Potro (ARG) | | | | | | | | ● ● ● ● | | | | 4 | 0 | 0 |
| 3 | Nenad Zimonjić (SRB) | | | | | | | ● | | ● ● | | | 0 | 3 | 0 |
| 3 | Fabio Fognini (ITA) | | | | | | | | ● | | ● | ● | 2 | 1 | 0 |
| 3 | Édouard Roger-Vasselin (FRA) | | | | | | | | | ● | | ● ● | 0 | 3 | 0 |
| 3 | Horia Tecău (ROU) | | | | | | | | | ● | | ● ● | 0 | 3 | 0 |
| 3 | Richard Gasquet (FRA) | | | | | | | | | | ● ● ● | | 3 | 0 | 0 |
| 3 | Nicolas Mahut (FRA) | | | | | | | | | | ● ● | ● | 2 | 1 | 0 |
| 3 | Tommy Robredo (ESP) | | | | | | | | | | ● ● | ● | 2 | 1 | 0 |
| 3 | Raven Klaasen (RSA) | | | | | | | | | | | ● ● ● | 0 | 3 | 0 |
| 3 | Jamie Murray (GBR) | | | | | | | | | | | ● ● ● | 0 | 3 | 0 |
| 3 | John Peers (AUS) | | | | | | | | | | | ● ● ● | 0 | 3 | 0 |
| 2 | Leander Paes (IND) | | ● | | | | | | | | | ● | 0 | 2 | 0 |
| 2 | Daniel Nestor (CAN) | | | ● | | | | | | | | ● | 0 | 1 | 1 |
| 2 | Fernando Verdasco (ESP) | | | | | ● | | | | | | ● | 0 | 2 | 0 |
| 2 | Julien Benneteau (FRA) | | | | | | | ● | | ● | | | 0 | 2 | 0 |
| 2 | Marcelo Melo (BRA) | | | | | | | ● | | | | ● | 0 | 2 | 0 |
| 2 | Aisam-ul-Haq Qureshi (PAK) | | | | | | | ● | | | | ● | 0 | 2 | 0 |
| 2 | Jean-Julien Rojer (NED) | | | | | | | ● | | | | ● | 0 | 2 | 0 |
| 2 | Mikhail Youzhny (RUS) | | | | | | | | ● | | ● | | 2 | 0 | 0 |
| 2 | Rohan Bopanna (IND) | | | | | | | | | ● | | ● | 0 | 2 | 0 |
| 2 | Michaël Llodra (FRA) | | | | | | | | | ● | | ● | 0 | 2 | 0 |
| 2 | David Ferrer (ESP) | | | | | | | | | | ● ● | | 2 | 0 | 0 |
| 2 | Ernests Gulbis (LAT) | | | | | | | | | | ● ● | | 2 | 0 | 0 |
| 2 | Tommy Haas (GER) | | | | | | | | | | ● ● | | 2 | 0 | 0 |
| 2 | John Isner (USA) | | | | | | | | | | ● ● | | 2 | 0 | 0 |
| 2 | Milos Raonic (CAN) | | | | | | | | | | ● ● | | 2 | 0 | 0 |
| 2 | Lukáš Rosol (CZE) | | | | | | | | | | ● | ● | 1 | 1 | 0 |
| 2 | Stanislas Wawrinka (SUI) | | | | | | | | | | ● | ● | 1 | 1 | 0 |
| 2 | Johan Brunström (SWE) | | | | | | | | | | | ● ● | 0 | 2 | 0 |
| 2 | Martin Emmrich (GER) | | | | | | | | | | | ● ● | 0 | 2 | 0 |
| 2 | Colin Fleming (GBR) | | | | | | | | | | | ● ● | 0 | 2 | 0 |
| 2 | Christopher Kas (GER) | | | | | | | | | | | ● ● | 0 | 2 | 0 |
| 2 | Santiago González (MEX) | | | | | | | | | | | ● ● | 0 | 2 | 0 |
| 2 | Julian Knowle (AUT) | | | | | | | | | | | ● ● | 0 | 2 | 0 |
| 2 | Scott Lipsky (USA) | | | | | | | | | | | ● ● | 0 | 2 | 0 |
| 2 | Filip Polášek (SVK) | | | | | | | | | | | ● ● | 0 | 2 | 0 |
| 1 | Radek Štěpánek (CZE) | | ● | | | | | | | | | | 0 | 1 | 0 |
| 1 | František Čermák (CZE) | | | ● | | | | | | | | | 0 | 0 | 1 |
| 1 | Matthew Ebden (AUS) | | | ● | | | | | | | | | 0 | 0 | 1 |
| 1 | Ivan Dodig (CRO) | | | | | | | ● | | | | | 0 | 1 | 0 |
| 1 | Kei Nishikori (JPN) | | | | | | | | ● | | | | 1 | 0 | 0 |
| 1 | Mahesh Bhupathi (IND) | | | | | | | | | ● | | | 0 | 1 | 0 |
| 1 | Mariusz Fyrstenberg (POL) | | | | | | | | | ● | | | 0 | 1 | 0 |
| 1 | Treat Conrad Huey (PHI) | | | | | | | | | ● | | | 0 | 1 | 0 |
| 1 | Dominic Inglot (GBR) | | | | | | | | | ● | | | 0 | 1 | 0 |
| 1 | Łukasz Kubot (POL) | | | | | | | | | ● | | | 0 | 1 | 0 |
| 1 | Robert Lindstedt (SWE) | | | | | | | | | ● | | | 0 | 1 | 0 |
| 1 | Marcin Matkowski (POL) | | | | | | | | | ● | | | 0 | 1 | 0 |
| 1 | Carlos Berlocq (ARG) | | | | | | | | | | ● | | 1 | 0 | 0 |
| 1 | Marin Čilić (CRO) | | | | | | | | | | ● | | 1 | 0 | 0 |
| 1 | Grigor Dimitrov (BUL) | | | | | | | | | | ● | | 1 | 0 | 0 |
| 1 | Roger Federer (SUI) | | | | | | | | | | ● | | 1 | 0 | 0 |
| 1 | Marcel Granollers (ESP) | | | | | | | | | | ● | | 1 | 0 | 0 |
| 1 | Ivo Karlović (CRO) | | | | | | | | | | ● | | 1 | 0 | 0 |
| 1 | Feliciano Lopez (ESP) | | | | | | | | | | ● | | 1 | 0 | 0 |
| 1 | Jürgen Melzer (AUT) | | | | | | | | | | ● | | 1 | 0 | 0 |
| 1 | Juan Mónaco (ARG) | | | | | | | | | | ● | | 1 | 0 | 0 |
| 1 | Albert Montañés (ESP) | | | | | | | | | | ● | | 1 | 0 | 0 |
| 1 | Gilles Simon (FRA) | | | | | | | | | | ● | | 1 | 0 | 0 |
| 1 | João Sousa (POR) | | | | | | | | | | ● | | 1 | 0 | 0 |
| 1 | Janko Tipsarević (SRB) | | | | | | | | | | ● | | 1 | 0 | 0 |
| 1 | Bernard Tomic (AUS) | | | | | | | | | | ● | | 1 | 0 | 0 |
| 1 | Jo-Wilfried Tsonga (FRA) | | | | | | | | | | ● | | 1 | 0 | 0 |
| 1 | Horacio Zeballos (ARG) | | | | | | | | | | ● | | 1 | 0 | 0 |
| 1 | Facundo Bagnis (ARG) | | | | | | | | | | | ● | 0 | 1 | 0 |
| 1 | Andre Begemann (GER) | | | | | | | | | | | ● | 0 | 1 | 0 |
| 1 | Thomaz Bellucci (BRA) | | | | | | | | | | | ● | 0 | 1 | 0 |
| 1 | James Blake (USA) | | | | | | | | | | | ● | 0 | 1 | 0 |
| 1 | Simone Bolelli (ITA) | | | | | | | | | | | ● | 0 | 1 | 0 |
| 1 | Eric Butorac (USA) | | | | | | | | | | | ● | 0 | 1 | 0 |
| 1 | Mikhail Elgin (RUS) | | | | | | | | | | | ● | 0 | 1 | 0 |
| 1 | Marc Gicquel (FRA) | | | | | | | | | | | ● | 0 | 1 | 0 |
| 1 | Denis Istomin (UZB) | | | | | | | | | | | ● | 0 | 1 | 0 |
| 1 | Martin Kližan (SVK) | | | | | | | | | | | ● | 0 | 1 | 0 |
| 1 | Philipp Kohlschreiber (GER) | | | | | | | | | | | ● | 0 | 1 | 0 |
| 1 | Paolo Lorenzi (ITA) | | | | | | | | | | | ● | 0 | 1 | 0 |
| 1 | Xavier Malisse (BEL) | | | | | | | | | | | ● | 0 | 1 | 0 |
| 1 | Florin Mergea (ROU) | | | | | | | | | | | ● | 0 | 1 | 0 |
| 1 | Nicholas Monroe (USA) | | | | | | | | | | | ● | 0 | 1 | 0 |
| 1 | Frank Moser (GER) | | | | | | | | | | | ● | 0 | 1 | 0 |
| 1 | Jarkko Nieminen (FIN) | | | | | | | | | | | ● | 0 | 1 | 0 |
| 1 | Benoît Paire (FRA) | | | | | | | | | | | ● | 0 | 1 | 0 |
| 1 | Purav Raja (IND) | | | | | | | | | | | ● | 0 | 1 | 0 |
| 1 | Divij Sharan (IND) | | | | | | | | | | | ● | 0 | 1 | 0 |
| 1 | Igor Sijsling (NED) | | | | | | | | | | | ● | 0 | 1 | 0 |
| 1 | Jack Sock (USA) | | | | | | | | | | | ● | 0 | 1 | 0 |
| 1 | Simon Stadler (GER) | | | | | | | | | | | ● | 0 | 1 | 0 |
| 1 | Potito Starace (ITA) | | | | | | | | | | | ● | 0 | 1 | 0 |
| 1 | Dmitry Tursunov (RUS) | | | | | | | | | | | ● | 0 | 1 | 0 |

=== Titles won by nation ===
| Total | Nation | Grand Slam | | | ATP Finals | | Masters 1000 | | Tour 500 | | Tour 250 | | Total | | |
| Total | Nation | S | D | X | S | D | S | D | S | D | S | D | S | D | X |
|---|---|---|---|---|---|---|---|---|---|---|---|---|---|---|---|
| 22 | Spain (ESP) | 2 | | | | 1 | 5 | | 2 | 1 | 8 | 3 | 17 | 5 | 0 |
| 14 | United States (USA) | | 3 | | | | | 4 | | 1 | 2 | 4 | 2 | 12 | 0 |
| 14 | France (FRA) | | | | | | | 1 | | 3 | 6 | 4 | 6 | 8 | 0 |
| 11 | Serbia (SRB) | 1 | | | 1 | | 3 | 1 | 2 | 2 | 1 | | 8 | 3 | 0 |
| 9 | Great Britain (GBR) | 1 | | | | | 1 | | | 1 | 2 | 4 | 4 | 5 | 0 |
| 9 | Brazil (BRA) | | | | | | | 2 | | 2 | | 5 | 0 | 9 | 0 |
| 8 | Argentina (ARG) | | | | | | | | 4 | | 3 | 1 | 7 | 1 | 0 |
| 7 | Austria (AUT) | | | | | | | 1 | | 2 | | 4 | 0 | 7 | 0 |
| 7 | Germany (GER) | | | | | | | | | | 2 | 5 | 2 | 5 | 0 |
| 6 | India (IND) | | 1 | | | | | | | 2 | | 3 | 0 | 6 | 0 |
| 4 | Belarus (BLR) | | | 1 | | | | | | 1 | | 2 | 0 | 3 | 1 |
| 4 | Canada (CAN) | | | 1 | | | | | | | 2 | 1 | 2 | 1 | 1 |
| 4 | Australia (AUS) | | | 1 | | | | | | | 1 | 2 | 1 | 2 | 1 |
| 4 | Italy (ITA) | | | | | | | | 1 | | 1 | 2 | 2 | 2 | 0 |
| 4 | Russia (RUS) | | | | | | | | 1 | | 1 | 2 | 2 | 2 | 0 |
| 4 | Romania (ROU) | | | | | | | | | 1 | | 3 | 0 | 4 | 0 |
| 3 | Czech Republic (CZE) | | 1 | 1 | | | | | | | 1 | | 1 | 1 | 1 |
| 3 | Croatia (CRO) | | | | | | | 1 | | | 2 | | 2 | 1 | 0 |
| 3 | Sweden (SWE) | | | | | | | | | 1 | | 2 | 0 | 3 | 0 |
| 3 | Switzerland (SUI) | | | | | | | | | | 2 | 1 | 2 | 1 | 0 |
| 3 | Slovakia (SVK) | | | | | | | | | | | 3 | 0 | 3 | 0 |
| 2 | Netherlands (NED) | | | | | | | 1 | | | | 1 | 0 | 2 | 0 |
| 2 | Poland (POL) | | | | | | | | | 2 | | | 0 | 2 | 0 |
| 2 | Latvia (LAT) | | | | | | | | | | 2 | | 2 | 0 | 0 |
| 2 | Mexico (MEX) | | | | | | | | | | | 2 | 0 | 2 | 0 |
| 2 | South Africa (RSA) | | | | | | | | | | | 2 | 0 | 2 | 0 |
| 1 | Pakistan (PAK) | | | | | | | 1 | | | | | 0 | 1 | 0 |
| 1 | Japan (JPN) | | | | | | | | 1 | | | | 1 | 0 | 0 |
| 1 | Philippines (PHI) | | | | | | | | | 1 | | | 0 | 1 | 0 |
| 1 | Bulgaria (BUL) | | | | | | | | | | 1 | | 1 | 0 | 0 |
| 1 | Portugal (POR) | | | | | | | | | | 1 | | 1 | 0 | 0 |
| 1 | Belgium (BEL) | | | | | | | | | | | 1 | 0 | 1 | 0 |
| 1 | Finland (FIN) | | | | | | | | | | | 1 | 0 | 1 | 0 |
| 1 | Uzbekistan (UZB) | | | | | | | | | | | 1 | 0 | 1 | 0 |

=== Titles information ===
The following players won their first main circuit title in singles, doubles, or mixed doubles:

Singles

- (Australia) Bernard Tomic – Sydney (draw)
- (Argentina) Horacio Zeballos – Viña del Mar (draw)
- (Czech Republic) Lukáš Rosol – Bucharest (draw)
- (France) Nicolas Mahut – 's-Hertogenbosch (draw)
- (Argentina) Carlos Berlocq – Båstad (draw)
- (Italy) Fabio Fognini – Stuttgart (draw)
- (Portugal) João Sousa – Kuala Lumpur (draw)
- (Bulgaria) Grigor Dimitrov – Stockholm (draw)

Doubles

- (France) Benoît Paire – Chennai (draw)
- (Italy) Paolo Lorenzi – Viña del Mar (draw)
- (Germany) Frank Moser – San Jose (draw)
- (United States) Jack Sock – Delray Beach (draw)
- (Australia) John Peers – Houston (draw)
- (South Africa) Raven Klaasen – Nice (draw)
- (Argentina) Facundo Bagnis – Stuttgart (draw)
- (Brazil) Thomaz Bellucci – Stuttgart (draw)
- (United States) Nicholas Monroe – Båstad (draw)
- (Germany) Simon Stadler – Båstad (draw)
- (India) Purav Raja – Bogotá (draw)
- (India) Divij Sharan – Bogotá (draw)
- (Slovakia) Martin Kližan – Umag (draw)
- (Netherlands) Igor Sijsling – Atlanta (draw)
- (Croatia) Ivan Dodig – Shanghai (draw)
- (Russia) Mikhail Elgin – Moscow (draw)
- (Uzbekistan) Denis Istomin – Moscow (draw)
- (Romania) Florin Mergea – Vienna (draw)

Mixed doubles

- (Australia) Matthew Ebden – Australian Open (draw)
- (Czech Republic) František Čermák – French Open (draw)

The following players defended a main circuit title in singles, doubles, or mixed doubles:

Singles

- (Spain) David Ferrer – Auckland (draw), Buenos Aires (draw)
- (United Kingdom) Andy Murray – Brisbane (draw)
- (Serbia) Novak Djokovic – Australian Open (draw), Beijing (draw), Shanghai (draw), ATP World Tour Finals (draw)
- (Canada) Milos Raonic – San Jose (draw)
- (Spain) Rafael Nadal – Barcelona (draw), Rome (draw), French Open (draw)
- (Argentina) Juan Martín del Potro – Basel (draw)

Doubles

- (United States) Bob Bryan – Sydney (draw)
- (United States) Mike Bryan – Sydney (draw)
- (Serbia) Nenad Zimonjić – Rotterdam (draw)
- (Brazil) Bruno Soares – São Paulo (draw)
- (Belgium) Xavier Malisse – San Jose (draw)
- (India) Mahesh Bhupathi – Dubai (draw)
- (Spain) David Marrero – Acapulco (draw), Umag (draw)
- (Romania) Horia Tecău – Bucharest (draw)

== ATP rankings ==
These are the ATP rankings of the top 20 singles players, doubles players, and the top 10 doubles teams on the ATP Tour, at the current date of the 2013 season. Players on a gold background have qualified for the Year-End Championships.

=== Singles ===
Race to the finals singles rankings final standings
| # | Player | Points | Tours |
|---|---|---|---|
| 1 | Rafael Nadal (ESP) | 12,030 | 20 |
| 2 | Novak Djokovic (SRB) | 10,610 | 18 |
| 3 | David Ferrer (ESP) | 5,800 | 25 |
| 4 | Andy Murray (GBR) | 5,790 | 19 |
| 5 | Juan Martín del Potro (ARG) | 5,055 | 21 |
| 6 | Tomáš Berdych (CZE) | 3,980 | 24 |
| 7 | Roger Federer (SUI) | 3,805 | 19 |
| 8 | Stan Wawrinka (SUI) | 3,330 | 25 |
| 9 | Richard Gasquet (FRA) | 3,300 | 25 |
| 10 | Jo-Wilfried Tsonga (FRA) | 3,065 | 21 |
| 11 | Milos Raonic (CAN) | 2,950 | 24 |
| 12 | Tommy Haas (GER) | 2,435 | 26 |
| 13 | Nicolás Almagro (ESP) | 2,290 | 24 |
| 14 | John Isner (USA) | 2,150 | 26 |
| 15 | Mikhail Youzhny (RUS) | 2,145 | 26 |
| 16 | Fabio Fognini (ITA) | 1,930 | 29 |
| 17 | Kei Nishikori (JPN) | 1,915 | 21 |
| 18 | Tommy Robredo (ESP) | 1,810 | 24 |
| 19 | Gilles Simon (FRA) | 1,790 | 25 |
| 20 | Kevin Anderson (RSA) | 1,685 | 23 |

Player has qualified for the 2013 ATP World Tour Finals
Player has qualified and subsequently withdrawn from the 2013 ATP World Tour Finals

Year-end rankings 2013 (30 December 2013)
| # | Player | Points | #Trn | '12 | High | Low | '12→'13 |
|---|---|---|---|---|---|---|---|
| 1 | Rafael Nadal (ESP) | 13,030 | 20 | 4 | 1 | 5 | ▲3 |
| 2 | Novak Djokovic (SRB) | 12,260 | 18 | 1 | 1 | 2 | ▼1 |
| 3 | David Ferrer (ESP) | 5,800 | 24 | 5 | 3 | 5 | ▲2 |
| 4 | Andy Murray (GBR) | 5,790 | 19 | 3 | 2 | 4 | ▼1 |
| 5 | Juan Martín del Potro (ARG) | 5,255 | 21 | 7 | 5 | 8 | ▲2 |
| 6 | Roger Federer (SUI) | 4,205 | 19 | 2 | 2 | 7 | ▼4 |
| 7 | Tomáš Berdych (CZE) | 4,180 | 24 | 6 | 5 | 7 | ▼1 |
| 8 | Stan Wawrinka (SUI) | 3,730 | 25 | 17 | 8 | 18 | ▲9 |
| 9 | Richard Gasquet (FRA) | 3,300 | 25 | 10 | 9 | 11 | ▲1 |
| 10 | Jo-Wilfried Tsonga (FRA) | 3,065 | 21 | 8 | 7 | 10 | ▼2 |
| 11 | Milos Raonic (CAN) | 2,860 | 24 | 13 | 10 | 18 | ▲2 |
| 12 | Tommy Haas (GER) | 2,435 | 26 | 21 | 11 | 22 | ▲9 |
| 13 | Nicolás Almagro (ESP) | 2,290 | 23 | 11 | 11 | 18 | ▼2 |
| 14 | John Isner (USA) | 2,150 | 26 | 14 | 13 | 23 | Steady |
| 15 | Mikhail Youzhny (RUS) | 2,145 | 26 | 25 | 15 | 32 | ▲10 |
| 16 | Fabio Fognini (ITA) | 1,930 | 29 | 45 | 16 | 47 | ▲29 |
| 17 | Kei Nishikori (JPN) | 1,915 | 21 | 19 | 11 | 21 | ▲2 |
| 18 | Tommy Robredo (ESP) | 1,810 | 24 | 114 | 18 | 114 | ▲96 |
| 19 | Gilles Simon (FRA) | 1,790 | 25 | 16 | 13 | 19 | ▼3 |
| 20 | Kevin Anderson (RSA) | 1,685 | 23 | 37 | 19 | 37 | ▲17 |

==== Number 1 ranking ====
| Holder | Date gained | Date forfeited |
|---|---|---|
| Novak Djokovic (SRB) | Year-End 2012 | 6 October 2013 |
| Rafael Nadal (ESP) | 7 October 2013 | Year-End 2013 |

=== Doubles ===
Race to the finals doubles ream rankings final standings
| # | Team | Points | Tours |
|---|---|---|---|
| 1 | Bob Bryan (USA); Mike Bryan (USA) | 15,110 | 22 |
| 2 | Alexander Peya (AUT); Bruno Soares (BRA) | 7,640 | 24 |
| 3 | Ivan Dodig (CRO); Marcelo Melo (BRA) | 4,735 | 19 |
| 4 | David Marrero (ESP); Fernando Verdasco (ESP) | 4,670 | 21 |
| 5 | Marcel Granollers (ESP); Marc López (ESP) | 4,000 | 24 |
| 6 | Aisam-ul-Haq Qureshi (PAK); Jean-Julien Rojer (NED) | 3,395 | 28 |
| 7 | Leander Paes (IND); Radek Štěpánek (CZE) | 3,190 | 8 |
| 8 | Mariusz Fyrstenberg (POL); Marcin Matkowski (POL) | 3,155 | 23 |
| 9 | Max Mirnyi (BLR); Horia Tecău (ROU) | 2,870 | 21 |
| 10 | Jamie Murray (GBR); John Peers (AUS) | 2,490 | 25 |

Team has qualified for the 2013 ATP World Tour Finals

Year-end rankings 2013 (30 December 2013)
| # | Player | Points | #Trn | 12' Rank | High | Low | '12→'13 |
|---|---|---|---|---|---|---|---|
| 1 | Bob Bryan (USA) | 14,960 | 22 | 1 | 1 | 1T | Steady |
| 1 | Mike Bryan (USA) | 14,960 | 22 | 2 | 2 | 1T | ▲1 |
| 3 | Bruno Soares (BRA) | 7,380 | 26 | 19 | 3 | 19 | ▲16 |
| 4 | Alexander Peya (AUT) | 7,310 | 25 | 22 | 3 | 24 | ▲18 |
| 5 | David Marrero (ESP) | 5,150 | 28 | 23 | 5 | 25 | ▲18 |
| 6 | Marcelo Melo (BRA) | 5,135 | 29 | 18 | 5 | 21 | ▲12 |
| 7 | Ivan Dodig (CRO) | 5,030 | 29 | 31 | 6 | 38 | ▲24 |
| 8 | Fernando Verdasco (ESP) | 4,580 | 23 | 29 | 8 | 38 | ▲21 |
| 9 | Radek Štěpánek (CZE) | 4,035 | 16 | 4 | 4 | 17 | ▼5 |
| 10 | Leander Paes (IND) | 4,025 | 20 | 3 | 3 | 15 | ▼7 |
| 11 | Marc López (ESP) | 3,860 | 23 | 6 | 3 | 11 | ▼5 |
| 12 | Marcel Granollers (ESP) | 3,860 | 24 | 10 | 4 | 12 | ▼2 |
| 13 | Rohan Bopanna (IND) | 3,600 | 25 | 12 | 3 | 13 | ▼1 |
| 14 | Nenad Zimonjić (SRB) | 3,510 | 24 | 20 | 11 | 22 | ▲6 |
| 15 | Aisam-ul-Haq Qureshi (PAK) | 3,350 | 28 | 14 | 8 | 15T | ▼1 |
| 15 | Jean-Julien Rojer (NED) | 3,350 | 29 | 13 | 6 | 15T | ▼2 |
| 17 | Édouard Roger-Vasselin (FRA) | 3,265 | 25 | 43 | 17 | 51 | ▲26 |
| 18 | Marcin Matkowski (POL) | 3,190 | 27 | 16 | 16 | 33 | ▼2 |
| 19 | Robert Lindstedt (SWE) | 3,185 | 28 | 8 | 3 | 19 | ▼11 |
| 20 | Mariusz Fyrstenberg (POL) | 3,100 | 23 | 15 | 15 | 32 | ▼5 |

==== Number 1 ranking ====
| Holder | Date gained | Date forfeited |
|---|---|---|
| Mike Bryan (USA) | Year-End 2012 | |
| Mike Bryan (USA); Bob Bryan (USA) | February 25, 2013 | Year-End 2013 |

== Prize money leaders ==
| # | Player | Singles | Doubles | Bonus Pool | Year-to-date |
|---|---|---|---|---|---|
| 1 | Rafael Nadal (ESP) | $12,060,915 | $10,020 | $2,500,000 | $14,570,935 |
| 2 | Novak Djokovic (SRB) | $11,186,137 | $11,810 | $1,250,000 | $12,447,947 |
| 3 | Andy Murray (GBR) | $5,366,225 | $49,996 | $0 | $5,416,221 |
| 4 | David Ferrer (ESP) | $4,079,492 | $7,461 | $800,000 | $4,886,953 |
| 5 | Juan Martín del Potro (ARG) | $3,886,965 | $7,074 | $400,000 | $4,294,039 |
| 6 | Roger Federer (SUI) | $3,193,912 | $9,725 | $405,000 | $3,203,637 |
| 7 | Tomáš Berdych (CZE) | $2,965,315 | $12,090 | $345,000 | $2,977,405 |
| 8 | Stanislas Wawrinka (SUI) | $2,843,188 | $37,737 | $224,000 | $2,880,925 |
| 9 | Richard Gasquet (FRA) | $2,387,176 | $24,723 | $250,000 | $2,661,899 |
| 10 | Mikhail Youzhny (RUS) | $1,690,456 | $100,338 | $0 | 1,790,794 |
as of December 3, 2013

== Statistics leaders ==
as of 17 November 2013

Aces
| # | Player | Aces | Matches |
|---|---|---|---|
| 1 | (United States) John Isner | 979 | 60 |
| 2 | (Canada) Milos Raonic | 883 | 60 |
| 3 | (South Africa) Kevin Anderson | 651 | 60 |
| 4 | (Spain) Nicolás Almagro | 622 | 65 |
| 5 | (Czech Republic) Tomáš Berdych | 603 | 74 |
| 6 | (United States) Sam Querrey | 576 | 45 |
| 7 | (Spain) Feliciano López | 546 | 49 |
| 8 | (France) Benoît Paire | 537 | 62 |
| 9 | (Croatia) Ivan Dodig | 520 | 56 |
| 10 | (Switzerland) Stanislas Wawrinka | 488 | 71 |

Service games won
| # | Player | % | Matches |
|---|---|---|---|
| 1 | (Canada) Milos Raonic | 91 | 60 |
| 2 | (United States) John Isner | 90 | 60 |
| 3 | (Spain) Rafael Nadal | 88 | 81 |
| 4 | (France) Jo-Wilfried Tsonga | 88 | 52 |
| 5 | (Serbia) Novak Djokovic | 88 | 76 |
| 6 | (Switzerland) Roger Federer | 87 | 62 |
| 7 | (Argentina) Juan Martín del Potro | 86 | 67 |
| 8 | (Czech Republic) Tomáš Berdych | 86 | 74 |
| 9 | (South Africa) Kevin Anderson | 86 | 60 |
| 10 | (Spain) Nicolás Almagro | 85 | 65 |

Break points saved
| # | Player | % | Matches |
|---|---|---|---|
| 1 | (United States) John Isner | 71 | 60 |
| 2 | (Spain) Rafael Nadal | 69 | 81 |
| 3 | (France) Jo-Wilfried Tsonga | 69 | 52 |
| 4 | (Latvia) Ernests Gulbis | 68 | 50 |
| 5 | (Canada) Milos Raonic | 68 | 60 |
| 6 | (Serbia) Janko Tipsarević | 68 | 42 |
| 7 | (Czech Republic) Tomáš Berdych | 67 | 74 |
| 8 | (Poland) Jerzy Janowicz | 67 | 43 |
| 9 | (Australia) Bernard Tomic | 67 | 43 |
| 10 | (Uzbekistan) Denis Istomin | 67 | 59 |

First serve percentage
| # | Player | % | Matches |
|---|---|---|---|
| 1 | (Spain) Roberto Bautista Agut | 71 | 48 |
| 2 | (Romania) Victor Hănescu | 70 | 43 |
| 3 | (Argentina) Juan Mónaco | 70 | 43 |
| 4 | (Spain) Rafael Nadal | 69 | 81 |
| 5 | (Russia) Nikolay Davydenko | 68 | 44 |
| 6 | (Australia) Bernard Tomic | 68 | 43 |
| 7 | (Argentina) Carlos Berlocq | 68 | 49 |
| 8 | (United States) John Isner | 68 | 60 |
| 9 | (Germany) Daniel Brands | 67 | 46 |
| 10 | (France) Gaël Monfils | 66 | 55 |

First service points won
| # | Player | % | Matches |
|---|---|---|---|
| 1 | (Canada) Milos Raonic | 82 | 60 |
| 2 | (United States) Sam Querrey | 79 | 45 |
| 3 | (United States) John Isner | 78 | 60 |
| 4 | (Spain) Nicolás Almagro | 78 | 65 |
| 5 | (Czech Republic) Tomáš Berdych | 78 | 74 |
| 6 | (Switzerland) Roger Federer | 76 | 62 |
| 7 | (Latvia) Ernests Gulbis | 76 | 50 |
| 8 | (Poland) Jerzy Janowicz | 76 | 43 |
| 9 | (Bulgaria) Grigor Dimitrov | 76 | 58 |
| 10 | (France) Jo-Wilfried Tsonga | 76 | 52 |

Second serve points won
| # | Player | % | Matches |
|---|---|---|---|
| 1 | (Serbia) Novak Djokovic | 60 | 76 |
| 2 | (Spain) Rafael Nadal | 57 | 81 |
| 3 | (United States) John Isner | 56 | 60 |
| 4 | (Germany) Philipp Kohlschreiber | 56 | 55 |
| 5 | (Switzerland) Roger Federer | 55 | 62 |
| 6 | (Switzerland) Stanislas Wawrinka | 55 | 71 |
| 7 | (France) Richard Gasquet | 54 | 71 |
| 8 | (Germany) Tommy Haas | 54 | 68 |
| 9 | (Argentina) Juan Martín del Potro | 54 | 67 |
| 10 | (Germany) Daniel Brands | 54 | 46 |

Points won returning 1st serve
| # | Player | % | Matches |
|---|---|---|---|
| 1 | (Serbia) Novak Djokovic | 35 | 76 |
| 2 | (Spain) Rafael Nadal | 35 | 81 |
| 3 | (Spain) David Ferrer | 34 | 84 |
| 4 | (United Kingdom) Andy Murray | 34 | 49 |
| 5 | (Italy) Fabio Fognini | 33 | 67 |
| 6 | (Switzerland) Roger Federer | 33 | 62 |
| 7 | (Spain) Tommy Robredo | 33 | 56 |
| 8 | (France) Gaël Monfils | 32 | 55 |
| 9 | (Russia) Nikolay Davydenko | 32 | 44 |
| 10 | (Argentina) Juan Mónaco | 32 | 43 |

Break points converted
| # | Player | % | Matches |
|---|---|---|---|
| 1 | (Russia) Nikolay Davydenko | 48 | 44 |
| 2 | (Spain) Rafael Nadal | 47 | 81 |
| 3 | (Australia) Lleyton Hewitt | 44 | 40 |
| 4 | (Croatia) Ivan Dodig | 44 | 56 |
| 5 | (Spain) Nicolás Almagro | 44 | 65 |
| 6 | (United Kingdom) Andy Murray | 44 | 49 |
| 7 | (Latvia) Ernests Gulbis | 44 | 50 |
| 8 | (Argentina) Juan Mónaco | 43 | 43 |
| 9 | (Japan) Kei Nishikori | 43 | 53 |
| 10 | (Italy) Fabio Fognini | 43 | 67 |

Return games won
| # | Player | % | Matches |
|---|---|---|---|
| 1 | (Spain) Rafael Nadal | 34 | 81 |
| 2 | (Serbia) Novak Djokovic | 33 | 76 |
| 3 | (Spain) David Ferrer | 33 | 84 |
| 4 | (United Kingdom) Andy Murray | 31 | 49 |
| 5 | (Argentina) Juan Mónaco | 31 | 43 |
| 6 | (Italy) Fabio Fognini | 31 | 67 |
| 7 | (Japan) Kei Nishikori | 30 | 53 |
| 8 | (Russia) Nikolay Davydenko | 28 | 44 |
| 9 | (France) Gilles Simon | 27 | 58 |
| 10 | (Spain) Tommy Robredo | 27 | 56 |

== Best matches by atptour.com ==
=== Best 5 Grand Slam matches ===
| | Event | Round | Surface | Winner | Opponent | Result |
|---|---|---|---|---|---|---|
| 1. | French Open | SF | Clay | (Spain) Rafael Nadal | (Serbia) Novak Djokovic | 6–4, 3–6, 6–1, 6–7^{(3–7)}, 9–7 |
| 2. | Wimbledon | SF | Grass | (Serbia) Novak Djokovic | (Argentina) Juan Martín del Potro | 7–5, 4–6, 7–6^{(7–2)}, 6–7^{(6–8)}, 6–3 |
| 3. | Australian Open | R4 | Hard | (Serbia) Novak Djokovic | (Switzerland) Stanislas Wawrinka | 1–6, 7–5, 6–4, 6–7^{(5–7)}, 12–10 |
| 4. | US Open | F | Hard | (Spain) Rafael Nadal | (Serbia) Novak Djokovic | 6–2, 3–6, 6–4, 6–1 |
| 5. | French Open | R3 | Clay | (Germany) Tommy Haas | (United States) John Isner | 7–5, 7–6^{(7–4)}, 4–6, 6–7^{(10–12)}, 10–8 |

=== Best 5 ATP World Tour matches ===
| | Event | Round | Surface | Winner | Opponent | Result |
|---|---|---|---|---|---|---|
| 1. | Canadian Open | SF | Hard | (Spain) Rafael Nadal | (Serbia) Novak Djokovic | 6–4, 3–6, 7–6^{(7–2)} |
| 2. | Shanghai Masters | F | Hard | (Serbia) Novak Djokovic | (Argentina) Juan Martín del Potro | 6–1, 3–6, 7–6^{(7–3)} |
| 3. | Indian Wells Open | R4 | Hard | (Spain) Rafael Nadal | (Latvia) Ernests Gulbis | 4–6, 6–4, 7–5 |
| 4. | Miami Open | F | Hard | (United Kingdom) Andy Murray | (Spain) David Ferrer | 2–6, 6–4, 7–6^{(7–1)} |
| 5. | Madrid Open | R2 | Clay | (Bulgaria) Grigor Dimitrov | (Serbia) Novak Djokovic | 7–6^{(8–6)}, 6–7^{(8–10)}, 6–3 |

== Point distribution ==
| Category | W | F | SF | QF | R16 | R32 | R64 | R128 | Q | Q3 | Q2 | Q1 |
| Grand Slam (128S) | 2000 | 1200 | 720 | 360 | 180 | 90 | 45 | 10^{1} | 25 | 16 | 8 | 0 |
| Grand Slam (64D) | 2000 | 1200 | 720 | 360 | 180 | 90 | 0 | – | 25^{2} | – | 0^{2} | 0^{2} |
| ATP World Tour Finals (8S/8D) | 1500 (max) 1100 (min) | 1000 (max) 600 (min) | 600 (max) 200 (min) | 200 for each round robin match win, +400 for a semifinal win, +500 for the final win. | | | | | | | | |
| ATP World Tour Masters 1000 (96S) | 1000 | 600 | 360 | 180 | 90 | 45 | 25^{3} | 10^{1} | 16 | – | 8 | 0 |
| ATP World Tour Masters 1000 (56S/48S) | 1000 | 600 | 360 | 180 | 90 | 45^{3} | 10^{1} | – | 25 | – | 16 | 0 |
| ATP World Tour Masters 1000 (32D/24D) | 1000 | 600 | 360 | 180 | 90^{3} | 0 | – | – | – | – | – | – |
| ATP World Tour 500 (48S) | 500 | 300 | 180 | 90 | 45 | 20^{3} | 0 | – | 10 | – | 4 | 0 |
| ATP World Tour 500 (32S) | 500 | 300 | 180 | 90 | 45 | 0 | – | – | 20 | – | 10 | 0 |
| ATP World Tour 500 (16D) | 500 | 300 | 180 | 90 | 0 | – | – | – | – | – | – | – |
| ATP World Tour 250 (56S/48S) | 250 | 150 | 90 | 45 | 20 | 10^{3} | 0 | – | 5 | 3 | 0 | 0 |
| ATP World Tour 250 (32S/28S) | 250 | 150 | 90 | 45 | 20^{3} | 0 | – | – | 12 | 6 | 0 | 0 |
| ATP World Tour 250 (24D) | 250 | 150 | 90 | 45 | 20^{3} | 0 | – | – | – | – | – | – |
| ATP World Tour 250 (16D) | 250 | 150 | 90 | 45 | 0 | – | – | – | – | – | – | – |

Glossary

^{1} Wild cards who lose at their first round matches at Grand Slam and ATP World Tour Masters 1000 events are not awarded ranking points.

^{2} Only applicable to the Wimbledon Championships, which is the only tournament in the entire ATP World Tour to feature a qualifying stage for doubles.

^{3} Any player who reaches the second round of a tournament by drawing a bye and then loses is given first round loser's points.

Davis Cup
| Rubber category | | Match win | Match loss | Team bonus | Performance bonus | Total achievable |
|---|---|---|---|---|---|---|
| Singles | Play-offs | 5 / 10^{1} | | | | 15 |
| Singles | First round | 40 | 10^{2} | | | 80 |
| Singles | Quarterfinals | 65 | | | | 130 |
| Singles | Semifinals | 70 | | | | 140 |
| Singles | Final | 75 | | 75^{3} | 125^{4} | 150 / 225^{3} / 275^{4} |
| Singles | Cumulative total | 500 | | 500 to 535^{3} | 625^{4} | 625^{4} |
| Doubles | Play-offs | 10 | | | | 10 |
| Doubles | First round | 50 | 10^{2} | | | 50 |
| Doubles | Quarterfinals | 80 | | | | 80 |
| Doubles | Semifinals | 90 | | | | 90 |
| Doubles | Final | 95 | | 35^{5} | | 95 / 130^{5} |
| Doubles | Cumulative total | 315 | | 350^{5} | | 350^{5} |

The Davis Cup World Group and World Group Play-Off matches awarded ATP Ranking points from 2009 to 2015.

Glossary

Only live matches earn points; dead rubbers earn no points. If a player does not compete in the singles of one or more rounds he will receive points from the previous round when playing singles at the next tie. This last rule also applies for playing in doubles matches.

^{1} A player who wins a singles rubber in the first day of the tie is awarded 5 points, whereas a singles rubber win in tie's last day grants 10 points for a total of 15 available points.

^{2} For the first round only, any player who competes in a live rubber, without a win, receives 10 ranking points for participation.

^{3} Team bonus awarded to a singles player who wins 7 live matches in a calendar year and his team wins the competition.

^{4} Performance bonus awarded to a singles player who wins 8 live matches in a calendar year. In this case, no Team bonus is awarded.

^{5} Team bonus awarded to an unchanged doubles team who wins 4 matches in a calendar year and his team wins the competition.

== Retirements ==
Following is a list of notable players (winners of a main tour title, and/or part of the ATP rankings top 100 (singles) or top 50 (doubles) for at least one week) who announced their retirement from professional tennis, became inactive (after not playing for more than 52 weeks), or were permanently banned from playing, during the 2013 season:

- Igor Andreev (born 14 July 1983 in Moscow, Russia) turned professional in 2002, and peaked at No. 18 in singles in 2008 and No. 59 in doubles in 2005. He won three singles titles on the main tour, as well as one doubles titles. Andreev reached one Grand Slam doubles es quarterfinal in his career at 2007 French Open. He was active part of the Russia Davis Cup team for 15 times between 2004 and 2012. He announced his retirement after several injuries, that compromised his career.
- James Blake (born 28 December 1979 in Yonkers, United States) turned professional in 1999, and peaked at No. 4 in singles in 2006 and No. 31 in doubles in 2003, making the year-end ATP rankings singles Top Ten twice (2006, 2008). The American won ten singles titles on the main tour, as well as seven doubles titles (including one Masters trophy). Blake reached three Grand Slam quarterfinals in his career, two at the US Open (2005, 2006), and one at the Australian Open (2008), made one final at the Shanghai year-end championships (2006, lost to Federer), and also played the Olympic Bronze medal match at the Beijing Olympics (2008, lost to Djokovic). Part of the United States Davis Cup team for 17 ties between 2001 and 2009, Blake took part in one victorious campaign (2007, def. Russia). He announced his last tournament would be the 2013 US Open in August.
- Igor Kunitsyn (born 30 September 1981 in Vladivostok, Russia) turned professional in 1999, and peaked at no. 35 in singles in 2009 and no. 49 in doubles in 2008. He won one single title on the main tour, as well as one doubles title. He was also a part of the Russia Davis Cup team for 8 ties between 2008 and 2013. He last played at the 2013 US Open – Men's singles qualifying in August.
- Xavier Malisse (born 19 July 1980 in Kortrijk, Belgium) turned professional in 1998, and peaked at no. 19 in singles in 2002 and no. 25 in doubles in 2011. The Belgian, named X-Man, won three singles titles on the main tour, as well as nine doubles titles (including one Grand Slam title). Malisse Grand Slam final was winning the 2004 French Open doubles with fellow Belgian Olivier Rochus. He was also part of the Belgium Davis Cup team for 15 ties between 1998 and 2013.
- Nicolás Massú (born 10 October 1979 in Viña del Mar, Chile) turned professional in 1997, and peaked at No. 9 in singles in 2004 and No. 31 in doubles in 2005. He won six singles titles on the main tour, as well as one doubles titles. His major winning was the double olympic gold at 2004 Olympic Games in singles and doubles, the only man in the open era to win both at the same event. Massú reached one Grand Slam doubles semifinals in his career at 2005 French Open, made one final at the Madrid Masters 2003, lost to Ferrero. He was active part of the Chile Davis Cup team for 15 ties between 1996 and 2011. He announced his retirement after several injuries, that compromised his career.
- Ricardo Mello (born 21 December 1980 in Campinas, Brazil) joined the pro tour in 1999, reached the singles no. 50 spot in 2005, and the doubles no. 118 ranking in the same year. He decided to retire after the 2013 Brasil Open, where he lost in the first round to Martín Alund.
- David Nalbandian (born 1 January 1982 in Unquillo, Argentina) turned professional in 2000, and peaked at no. 3 in singles in 2006 and no. 105 in doubles in 2009. He won 11 singles titles on the main tour. His major goals were the single final at 2002 Wimbledon Championships, where he lost to Lleyton Hewitt and the 2005 Tennis Masters Cup trophy, which he won over Roger Federer. Nalbandian reached four Grand Slam singles semifinals in his career at the 2006 Australian Open, the 2004 French Open and the 2006 French Open, and the 2003 US Open. He was active part of the Argentina Davis Cup team for 26 ties between 2002 and 2013. He announced his retirement after several injuries that compromised his career.
- Iván Navarro (born 19 October 1981 in Alicante, Spain) joined the pro tour in 2001, reached the singles no. 67 spot in 2009, and the doubles no. 127 ranking in March 1999. Lately, he fell out of the top 250. He was known for his unique relentless serve and volley. He decided to end up with the tennis career at the 2013 Open Prévadiès Saint–Brieuc, where he lost in the first round to Dominik Meffert.
- Dick Norman (born 1 March 1971 in Waregem, Belgium) joined the pro tour in 1991, reached the singles no. 85 spot in 2006, and the doubles no. 10 ranking in April 2010. His major goal was the 2009 French Open doubles final in pair with Wesley Moodie, but they lost against Lukáš Dlouhý and Leander Paes. He decided to retire after competing at the 2013 Topshelf Open, where he lost in the first round in pair with fellow Belgian David Goffin, at the age of 42.
- Andreas Vinciguerra (born 19 February 1981 in Malmö, Sweden) turned professional in 1998, and peaked at No. 33 in singles in 2001. He won one singles title on the main tour. Vinciguerra announced his retirement in 2013.

== Comebacks ==
Following are notable players who made a comeback after retirements during the 2013 ATP Tour season:

- (Sweden) Jonas Björkman (born 23 March 1972, in Alvesta, Sweden), turned professional in 1991. Former world No. 4 in singles and No. 1 doubles. 10-time Grand Slam champion (10 in doubles). Holds 6 singles & 54 doubles titles. He made a one-off appearance at the Stockholm Open in October.
- (Sweden) Joachim Johansson (born 1 July 1982 in Lund, Sweden), turned professional in 2000. He reached the semi-finals of the 2004 US Open and achieved a career-high singles ranking of World No. 9. After two years without playing a game, he returned to the Stockholm Open, losing to M. Raonic in the round of 32.
- (Netherlands) Rogier Wassen (born 9 August 1976 in Roermond, Netherlands), turned professional in 1994. He reached the quarterfinals-finals of the 2007 Australian Open and achieved a career-high doubles ranking of World No. 24. He returned to the ATP tour at the Marburg Challenger event, playing doubles with Artem Sitak.

== See also ==
- 2013 WTA Tour
- 2013 ATP Challenger Tour
- 2013 ITF Women's Circuit
- 2013 ITF Men's Circuit
- Association of Tennis Professionals
- International Tennis Federation
