= 2013 Rakuten Japan Open Tennis Championships =

- Date: 30 September – 6 October
- Edition: 40th
- Category: ATP World Tour 500
- Surface: Hard / outdoor
- Location: Tokyo, Japan

Champions

Singles
- (Argentina) Juan Martín del Potro

Doubles
- (India) Rohan Bopanna / (France) Édouard Roger-Vasselin
← 2012 ·	Japan Open	· 2014 →

The 2013 Rakuten Japan Open Tennis Championships was a men's tennis tournament played on outdoor hard courts. It was the 40th edition of the event known this year as the Rakuten Japan Open Tennis Championships, and part of the 500 Series of the 2013 ATP World Tour. It was held at the Ariake Coliseum in Tokyo, Japan, from September 30 till October 6, 2013. First-seeded Juan Martín del Potro won the singles title.

== Points and prize money ==
=== Point distribution ===
Event	W	F	SF	QF	Round of 16	Round of 32	Q	Q2	Q1
Singles	500	300	180	90	45	0	20	10	0
Doubles	500	300	180	90	0	—	—	—	—

=== Prize money ===
Event	W	F	SF	QF	Round of 16	Round of 32	Q2	Q1
Singles	$312,000	$140,700	$66,650	$32,160	$16,400	$9,020	$1,020	$565
Doubles	$92,200	$41,600	$19,610	$9,480	$4,870	—	—	—

== Singles main-draw entrants ==
=== Seeds ===
Country	Player	Rank^{1}	Seed
ARG	Juan Martín del Potro	7	1
FRA	Jo-Wilfried Tsonga	8	2
CAN	Milos Raonic	11	3
JPN	Kei Nishikori	12	4
FRA	Gilles Simon	14	5
ESP	Nicolás Almagro	17	6
RSA	Kevin Anderson	21	7
SRB	Janko Tipsarević	23	8

- ^{1} Rankings are as of September 23, 2013.

=== Other entrants ===
The following players received wildcards into the singles main draw:

- (Argentina) Juan Martín del Potro
- (Japan) Tatsuma Ito
- (Japan) Go Soeda
- (Japan) Yūichi Sugita

The following players received entry from the qualifying draw:

- (Germany) Benjamin Becker
- (Switzerland) Marco Chiudinelli
- (United States) Ryan Harrison
- (France) Édouard Roger-Vasselin

The following players received entry as lucky losers:

- (Slovakia) Lukáš Lacko
- (Poland) Michał Przysiężny

=== Withdrawals ===
Before the tournament

- (France) Michaël Llodra (back injury)
- (United Kingdom) Andy Murray (back surgery)
- (France) Gilles Simon (groin injury)

== Doubles main-draw entrants ==
=== Seeds ===
Country	Player	Country	Player	Rank^{1}	Seed
USA	Bob Bryan	USA	Mike Bryan	2	1
ESP	Marcel Granollers	ESP	Marc López	17	2
CRO	Ivan Dodig	BRA	Marcelo Melo	32	3
IND	Rohan Bopanna	FRA	Édouard Roger-Vasselin	33	4

- Rankings are as of September 23, 2013

=== Other entrants ===
The following pairs received wildcards into the doubles main draw:

- (Japan) Tatsuma Ito / (Japan) Go Soeda
- (Japan) Kei Nishikori / (Japan) Yasutaka Uchiyama

The following pair received entry as alternates:

- (Germany) Andre Begemann / (Germany) Martin Emmrich

=== Withdrawals ===
Before the tournament

- (France) Michaël Llodra (back injury)

== Finals ==
=== Singles ===
- (Argentina) Juan Martín del Potro defeated (Canada) Milos Raonic, 7–6^{(7–5)}, 7–5

=== Doubles ===
- (India) Rohan Bopanna / (France) Édouard Roger-Vasselin defeated (United Kingdom) Jamie Murray / (Australia) John Peers, 7–6^{(7–5)}, 6–4
