= 2013 Rakuten Japan Open Tennis Championships – Doubles =

Doubles
- 2013 Rakuten Japan Open Tennis Championships

Final
- Champions: (India) Rohan Bopanna (France) Édouard Roger-Vasselin
- Runners-up: (United Kingdom) Jamie Murray (Australia) John Peers
- Score: 7–6^{(7–5)}, 6–4

Details
- Draw: 16 (2WC)
- Seeds: 4

Events
| Singles | Doubles |
- Japan Open

Alexander Peya and Bruno Soares were the defending champions, but decided not to participate.
Rohan Bopanna and Édouard Roger-Vasselin won the title, defeating Jamie Murray and John Peers in the final, 7–6^{(7–5)}, 6–4.

== Seeds ==
1. (United States) Bob Bryan / (United States) Mike Bryan (first round)
2. (Spain) Marcel Granollers / (Spain) Marc López (quarterfinals)
3. (Croatia) Ivan Dodig / (Brazil) Marcelo Melo (quarterfinals)
4. (India) Rohan Bopanna / (France) Édouard Roger-Vasselin (champions)

== Draw ==
Key

- Q = Qualifier
- WC = Wild card
- LL = Lucky loser
- Alt = Alternate
- ITF = ITF entry
- PR = Protected ranking
- SR = Special ranking
- SE = Special exempt
- JE = Junior exempt
- JR = Junior Accelerator Programme entrant
- CO = College Accelerator Programme entrant
- NG = Next Gen Accelerator Program entrant
- w/o = Walkover
- r = Retired
- d = Defaulted

=== Draw ===
First round
1 | (United States) B Bryan (United States) M Bryan | 5 | 6 | [6]
PR | (Spain) N Almagro (Uruguay) P Cuevas | 7 | 1 | [10]
(United Kingdom) J Murray (Australia) J Peers | 6 | 6
WC | (Japan) T Ito (Japan) G Soeda | 3 | 2
3 | (Croatia) I Dodig (Brazil) M Melo | 6 | 6
WC | (Japan) K Nishikori (Japan) Y Uchiyama | 4 | 1
(Austria) J Knowle (Austria) J Melzer | 6 | 7
(Mexico) S González (United States) S Lipsky | 4 | 5
(Italy) D Bracciali (Serbia) J Tipsarević | 3 | 3
Alt | (Germany) A Begemann (Germany) M Emmrich | 6 | 6
(Argentina) J Mónaco (Argentina) H Zeballos | 5 | 6 | [5]
4 | (India) R Bopanna (France) É Roger-Vasselin | 7 | 4 | [10]
(Philippines) T Huey (United Kingdom) D Inglot | 2 | 7 | [10]
(South Africa) K Anderson (Australia) P Hanley | 6 | 5 | [4]
(Finland) J Nieminen (Russia) D Tursunov | 4 | 4
2 | (Spain) M Granollers (Spain) M López | 6 | 6

Quarterfinals
PR | (Spain) N Almagro (Uruguay) P Cuevas | 5 | 1
(United Kingdom) J Murray (Australia) J Peers | 7 | 6
3 | (Croatia) I Dodig (Brazil) M Melo | 4 | 6 | [8]
(Austria) J Knowle (Austria) J Melzer | 6 | 3 | [10]
Alt | (Germany) A Begemann (Germany) M Emmrich | 1 | 6 | [10]
4 | (India) R Bopanna (France) É Roger-Vasselin | 6 | 3 | [12]
(Philippines) T Huey (United Kingdom) D Inglot | 6 | 6
2 | (Spain) M Granollers (Spain) M López | 3 | 3

Semifinals
(United Kingdom) J Murray (Australia) J Peers | 6 | 6
(Austria) J Knowle (Austria) J Melzer | 3 | 4
4 | (India) R Bopanna (France) É Roger-Vasselin | 6 | 7^{8}
(Philippines) T Huey (United Kingdom) D Inglot | 4 | 6^{6}

Final
(United Kingdom) J Murray (Australia) J Peers | 6^{5} | 4
4 | (India) R Bopanna (France) É Roger-Vasselin | 7^{7} | 6
