= 2013 Rakuten Japan Open Tennis Championships – Singles =

Singles
- 2013 Rakuten Japan Open Tennis Championships

Final
- Champion: (Argentina) Juan Martín del Potro
- Runner-up: (Canada) Milos Raonic
- Score: 7–6^{(7–5)}, 7–5

Details
- Draw: 32 (4Q / 4WC)
- Seeds: 8

Events
Singles	Doubles
- Japan Open

Kei Nishikori was the defending champion, but lost in the quarter-finals to Nicolás Almagro.
First-seeded Juan Martín del Potro won the title, defeating Milos Raonic in the final, 7–6^{(7–5)}, 7–5.

== Seeds ==
1. (Argentina) Juan Martín del Potro (champion)
2. (France) Jo-Wilfried Tsonga (second round)
3. (Canada) Milos Raonic (final)
4. (Japan) Kei Nishikori (quarterfinals)
5. (France) Gilles Simon (withdrew)
6. (Spain) Nicolás Almagro (semifinals)
7. (South Africa) Kevin Anderson (first round)
8. (Serbia) Janko Tipsarević (second round)

== Draw ==
Key

- Q = Qualifier
- WC = Wild card
- LL = Lucky loser
- Alt = Alternate
- ITF = ITF entry
- PR = Protected ranking
- SR = Special ranking
- SE = Special exempt
- JE = Junior exempt
- JR = Junior Accelerator Programme entrant
- CO = College Accelerator Programme entrant
- NG = Next Gen Accelerator Program entrant
- w/o = Walkover
- r = Retired
- d = Defaulted

=== Finals ===
Semifinals
1/WC	(Argentina) Juan Martín del Potro	7^{9}	7^{7}
6	(Spain) Nicolás Almagro	6^{7}	6^{1}
3	(Canada) Milos Raonic	7^{7}	6
(Croatia) Ivan Dodig	6^{4}	1

Final
1/WC	(Argentina) Juan Martín del Potro	7^{7}	7
3	(Canada) Milos Raonic	6^{5}	5

=== Top half ===
First round
1/WC	(Argentina) JM del Potro	4	6	6
(Cyprus) M Baghdatis	6	4	3
(Argentina) C Berlocq	7^{7}	6
PR	(Uruguay) P Cuevas	6^{4}	2
(Ukraine) A Dolgopolov	6	6
(Germany) D Brands	3	1
(Romania) V Hănescu	7^{8}	1	4
8	(Serbia) J Tipsarević	6^{6}	6	6
4	(Japan) K Nishikori	6^{4}	7	6
(Austria) J Melzer	7^{7}	5	2
(Spain) F López	4	7	6
WC	(Japan) T Ito	6	5	3
Q	(United States) R Harrison	1	6	4
(Argentina) H Zeballos	6	4	6
Q	(Germany) B Becker	6^{4}	6^{3}
6	(Spain) N Almagro	7^{7}	7^{7}

Second round
1/WC	(Argentina) JM del Potro	6	6
(Argentina) C Berlocq	2	2
(Ukraine) A Dolgopolov	6	7^{7}
8	(Serbia) J Tipsarević	3	6^{2}
4	(Japan) K Nishikori	7^{7}	6
(Spain) F López	6^{4}	0
(Argentina) H Zeballos	4	2
6	(Spain) N Almagro	6	6

Quarterfinals
1/WC	(Argentina) JM del Potro	4	6	6
(Ukraine) A Dolgopolov	6	4	2
4	(Japan) K Nishikori	6^{2}	7	3
6	(Spain) N Almagro	7^{7}	5	6

Semifinals
1/WC	(Argentina) JM del Potro	7^{9}	7^{7}
6	(Spain) N Almagro	6^{7}	6^{1}

=== Bottom half ===
First round
7	(South Africa) K Anderson	4	6^{2}
LL	(Slovakia) L Lacko	6	7^{7}
Q	(France) É Roger-Vasselin	6	3	6
(Russia) D Tursunov	4	6	3
Q	(Switzerland) M Chiudinelli	6^{2}	6	6^{6}
(France) J Chardy	7^{7}	3	7^{8}
WC	(Japan) G Soeda	4	6^{0}
3	(Canada) M Raonic	6	7^{7}
LL	(Poland) M Przysiężny	1	6	6
(Spain) M Granollers	6	3	4
(Finland) J Nieminen	7^{7}	6
(Argentina) J Mónaco	6^{4}	1
WC	(Japan) Y Sugita	3	1
(Croatia) I Dodig	6	6
(France) G Monfils	3	6^{8}
2	(France) J-W Tsonga	6	7^{10}

Second round
LL	(Slovakia) L Lacko	7	6
Q	(France) É Roger-Vasselin	5	4
(France) J Chardy	4	3
3	(Canada) M Raonic	6	6
LL	(Poland) M Przysiężny	7^{7}	4	2
(Finland) J Nieminen	6^{4}	6	6
(Croatia) I Dodig	6	7^{7}
2	(France) J-W Tsonga	4	6^{5}

Quarterfinals
LL	(Slovakia) L Lacko	3	3
3	(Canada) M Raonic	6	6
(Finland) J Nieminen	2	6^{3}
(Croatia) I Dodig	6	7^{7}

Semifinals
3	(Canada) M Raonic	7^{7}	6
(Croatia) I Dodig	6^{4}	1

== Qualifying ==
=== Seeds ===
1. (Argentina) Federico Delbonis (first round)
2. (France) Édouard Roger-Vasselin (qualified)
3. (Germany) Benjamin Becker (qualified)
4. (Slovenia) Grega Žemlja (first round, retired)
5. (Slovakia) Lukáš Lacko (qualifying competition, lucky loser)
6. (Poland) Michał Przysiężny (qualifying competition, lucky loser)
7. (Colombia) Alejandro Falla (qualifying competition)
8. (United States) Michael Russell (qualifying competition)

=== Qualifiers ===
1. (Switzerland) Marco Chiudinelli
2. (France) Édouard Roger-Vasselin
3. (Germany) Benjamin Becker
4. (United States) Ryan Harrison

=== Lucky losers ===
1. (Slovakia) Lukáš Lacko
2. (Poland) Michał Przysiężny

=== Qualifying draw ===
==== First qualifier ====
First round
1	(Argentina) Federico Delbonis	6^{7}	0
(Switzerland) Marco Chiudinelli	7^{9}	6
(Japan) Hiroki Moriya	3	6^{4}
8	(United States) Michael Russell	6	7^{7}

Qualifying competition
(Switzerland) Marco Chiudinelli	7	6
8	(United States) Michael Russell	5	4

==== Second qualifier ====
First round
2	(France) Édouard Roger-Vasselin	6	7^{7}
(Italy) Matteo Viola	2	6^{3}
WC	(Japan) Yasutaka Uchiyama	4	6^{6}
7	(Colombia) Alejandro Falla	6	7^{8}

Qualifying competition
2	(France) Édouard Roger-Vasselin	7	2	6
7	(Colombia) Alejandro Falla	5	6	3

==== Third qualifier ====
First round
3	(Germany) Benjamin Becker	6	6
(Germany) Mischa Zverev	4	2
WC	(Japan) Shuichi Sekiguchi	3	2
6	(Poland) Michał Przysiężny	6	6

Qualifying competition
3	(Germany) Benjamin Becker	2	7^{7}	7^{8}
6	(Poland) Michał Przysiężny	6	6^{5}	6^{6}

==== Fourth qualifier ====
First round
4	(Slovenia) Grega Žemlja	6	6^{6}	0^{r}
WC	(United States) Ryan Harrison	3	7^{8}	0
(Australia) James Duckworth	6^{5}	6	4
5	(Slovakia) Lukáš Lacko	7^{7}	4	6

Qualifying competition
WC	(United States) Ryan Harrison	2	6	6
5	(Slovakia) Lukáš Lacko	6	4	2
