= 2013 Barcelona Open Banco Sabadell – Doubles =

Doubles
- 2013 Barcelona Open Banco Sabadell

Final
- Champions: (Austria) Alexander Peya (Brazil) Bruno Soares
- Runners-up: (Sweden) Robert Lindstedt (Canada) Daniel Nestor
- Score: 5–7, 7–6^{(9–7)}, [10–4]

Events
Singles	Doubles
← 2012 ·	Barcelona Open Banco Sabadell	· 2014 →

Mariusz Fyrstenberg and Marcin Matkowski were the defending champions, but lost to David Marrero and Fernando Verdasco in the quarterfinals.
Alexander Peya and Bruno Soares won the tournament, defeating Robert Lindstedt and Daniel Nestor in the final, 5–7, 7–6^{(9–7)}, [10–4].

== Seeds ==
1. (United States) Bob Bryan / (United States) Mike Bryan (withdrew)
2. (Spain) Marcel Granollers / (Spain) Marc López (semifinals)
3. (Sweden) Robert Lindstedt / (Canada) Daniel Nestor (final)
4. (Pakistan) Aisam-ul-Haq Qureshi / (Netherlands) Jean-Julien Rojer (first round)

== Draw ==
=== Key ===
- Q = Qualifier
- WC = Wild card
- LL = Lucky loser
- Alt = Alternate
- SE = Special exempt
- PR = Protected ranking
- ITF = ITF entry
- JE = Junior exempt
- w/o = Walkover
- r = Retired
- d = Defaulted
- SR = Special ranking

=== Draw ===
First round
Alt	(Russia) N Davydenko (Uzbekistan) D Istomin	4	6	[10]
(Spain) D Marrero (Spain) F Verdasco	6	1	[12]
(Poland) M Fyrstenberg (Poland) M Matkowski	6	7
(Philippines) TC Huey (Poland) J Janowicz	4	5
3	(Sweden) R Lindstedt (Canada) D Nestor	6	2	[16]
(Spain) N Almagro (Serbia) N Zimonjić	1	6	[14]
(Croatia) I Dodig (Brazil) M Melo	7	6
(Bulgaria) G Dimitrov (Czech Republic) R Štěpánek	6^{5}	2
(Austria) A Peya (Brazil) B Soares	6	6^{5}	[10]
(Argentina) C Berlocq (France) J Chardy	1	7^{7}	[8]
(United Kingdom) C Fleming (United Kingdom) J Marray	6	2	[10]
4	(Pakistan) A-u-H Qureshi (Netherlands) J-J Rojer	4	6	[6]
(Argentina) J Mónaco (Japan) K Nishikori	6	6
WC	(Spain) A Ramos (Spain) T Robredo	2	3
WC	(Spain) G Granollers (Spain) A Montañés	4	4
2	(Spain) M Granollers (Spain) M López	6	6

Quarterfinals
(Spain) D Marrero (Spain) F Verdasco	7	7^{7}
(Poland) M Fyrstenberg (Poland) M Matkowski	5	6^{3}
3	(Sweden) R Lindstedt (Canada) D Nestor	6	7^{8}
(Croatia) I Dodig (Brazil) M Melo	4	6^{6}
(Austria) A Peya (Brazil) B Soares	7^{7}	6
(United Kingdom) C Fleming (United Kingdom) J Marray	6^{5}	4
(Argentina) J Mónaco (Japan) K Nishikori	2	3
2	(Spain) M Granollers (Spain) M López	6	6

Semifinals
(Spain) D Marrero (Spain) F Verdasco	6	6^{6}	[3]
3	(Sweden) R Lindstedt (Canada) D Nestor	4	7^{8}	[10]
(Austria) A Peya (Brazil) B Soares	6	6
2	(Spain) M Granollers (Spain) M López	3	4

Final
3	(Sweden) R Lindstedt (Canada) D Nestor	7	6^{7}	[3]
(Austria) A Peya (Brazil) B Soares	5	7^{9}	[10]
