= 2013 International German Open – Doubles =

Doubles
- 2013 International German Open

Final
- Champions: (Poland) Mariusz Fyrstenberg (Poland) Marcin Matkowski
- Runners-up: (Austria) Alexander Peya (Brazil) Bruno Soares
- Score: 3–6, 6–1, [10–8]

Details
- Draw: 16
- Seeds: 4

Events
Singles	Doubles
- International German Open

David Marrero and Fernando Verdasco were the defending champions, but withdrew from the semifinals against Alexander Peya and Bruno Soares.
Mariusz Fyrstenberg and Marcin Matkowski won the title, defeating Peya and Soares in the final, 3–6, 6–1, [10–8].

== Seeds ==
1. (Spain) Marcel Granollers / (Spain) Marc López (quarterfinals)
2. (Austria) Alexander Peya / (Brazil) Bruno Soares (final)
3. (Spain) David Marrero / (Spain) Fernando Verdasco (semifinals, withdrew)
4. (Austria) Julian Knowle / (Sweden) Robert Lindstedt (first round)

== Draw ==
Key

- Q = Qualifier
- WC = Wild card
- LL = Lucky loser
- Alt = Alternate
- ITF = ITF entry
- PR = Protected ranking
- SR = Special ranking
- SE = Special exempt
- JE = Junior exempt
- JR = Junior Accelerator Programme entrant
- CO = College Accelerator Programme entrant
- NG = Next Gen Accelerator Program entrant
- w/o = Walkover
- r = Retired
- d = Defaulted

=== Draw ===
First round
1	(Spain) M Granollers (Spain) M López	6	6
(France) J Chardy (Poland) Ł Kubot	3	3
(Australia) P Hanley (Slovakia) M Mertiňák	2	6^{5}
(Poland) M Fyrstenberg (Poland) M Matkowski	6	7^{7}
4	(Austria) J Knowle (Sweden) R Lindstedt	3	4
(Brazil) T Bellucci (France) B Paire	6	6
(Czech Republic) L Dlouhý (Slovakia) M Kližan	6	3	[12]
(Poland) T Bednarek (Poland) J Janowicz	3	6	[10]
(Czech Republic) F Čermák (Slovakia) F Polášek	6	6
(Romania) H Tecău (Argentina) H Zeballos	4	4
(Italy) D Bracciali (Italy) F Fognini	1	6	[9]
3	(Spain) D Marrero (Spain) F Verdasco	6	1	[11]
(Czech Republic) L Rosol (Italy) A Seppi	6	7
WC	(Germany) D Brands (Germany) C Kas	2	5
WC	(Germany) A Begemann (Germany) M Emmrich	6^{3}	1
2	(Austria) A Peya (Brazil) B Soares	7^{7}	6

Quarterfinals
1	(Spain) M Granollers (Spain) M López	6^{5}	4
(Poland) M Fyrstenberg (Poland) M Matkowski	7^{7}	6
(Brazil) T Bellucci (France) B Paire
(Czech Republic) L Dlouhý (Slovakia) M Kližan	w/o
(Czech Republic) F Čermák (Slovakia) F Polášek	3	6	[8]
3	(Spain) D Marrero (Spain) F Verdasco	6	4	[10]
(Czech Republic) L Rosol (Italy) A Seppi	1	4
2	(Austria) A Peya (Brazil) B Soares	6	6

Semifinals
(Poland) M Fyrstenberg (Poland) M Matkowski	7	4	[10]
(Czech Republic) L Dlouhý (Slovakia) M Kližan	5	6	[7]
3	(Spain) D Marrero (Spain) F Verdasco
2	(Austria) A Peya (Brazil) B Soares	w/o

Final
(Poland) M Fyrstenberg (Poland) M Matkowski	3	6	[10]
2	(Austria) A Peya (Brazil) B Soares	6	1	[8]
