= 2013 ATP World Tour Finals =

- Date: 4–11 November
- Edition: 44th (singles) / 39th (doubles)
- Category: ATP World Tour Finals
- Draw: 8S / 8D
- Prize money: $6,000,000
- Surface: Hard / indoor
- Location: London, United Kingdom
- Venue: O_{2} arena

Champions

Singles
- (Serbia) Novak Djokovic

Doubles
- (Spain) David Marrero / (Spain) Fernando Verdasco
- ATP World Tour Finals

The 2013 ATP World Tour Finals (also known as the 2013 Barclays ATP World Tour Finals for sponsorship reasons) was a men's tennis year-end tournament that was played on indoor hard courts at the O_{2} Arena in London, United Kingdom, between 4 and 11 November 2013. It was the season-ending event for the best singles players and doubles teams of the 2013 ATP World Tour.

== Finals ==
=== Singles ===
(Serbia) Novak Djokovic defeated (Spain) Rafael Nadal, 6–3, 6–4

- It was Djokovic's 7th title of the year and 41st of his career. It was his 3rd win at the event, winning in 2008 and 2012.

=== Doubles ===
(Spain) David Marrero / (Spain) Fernando Verdasco defeated (United States) Bob Bryan / (United States) Mike Bryan, 7–5, 6–7^{(3–7)}, [10–7]

== Tournament ==
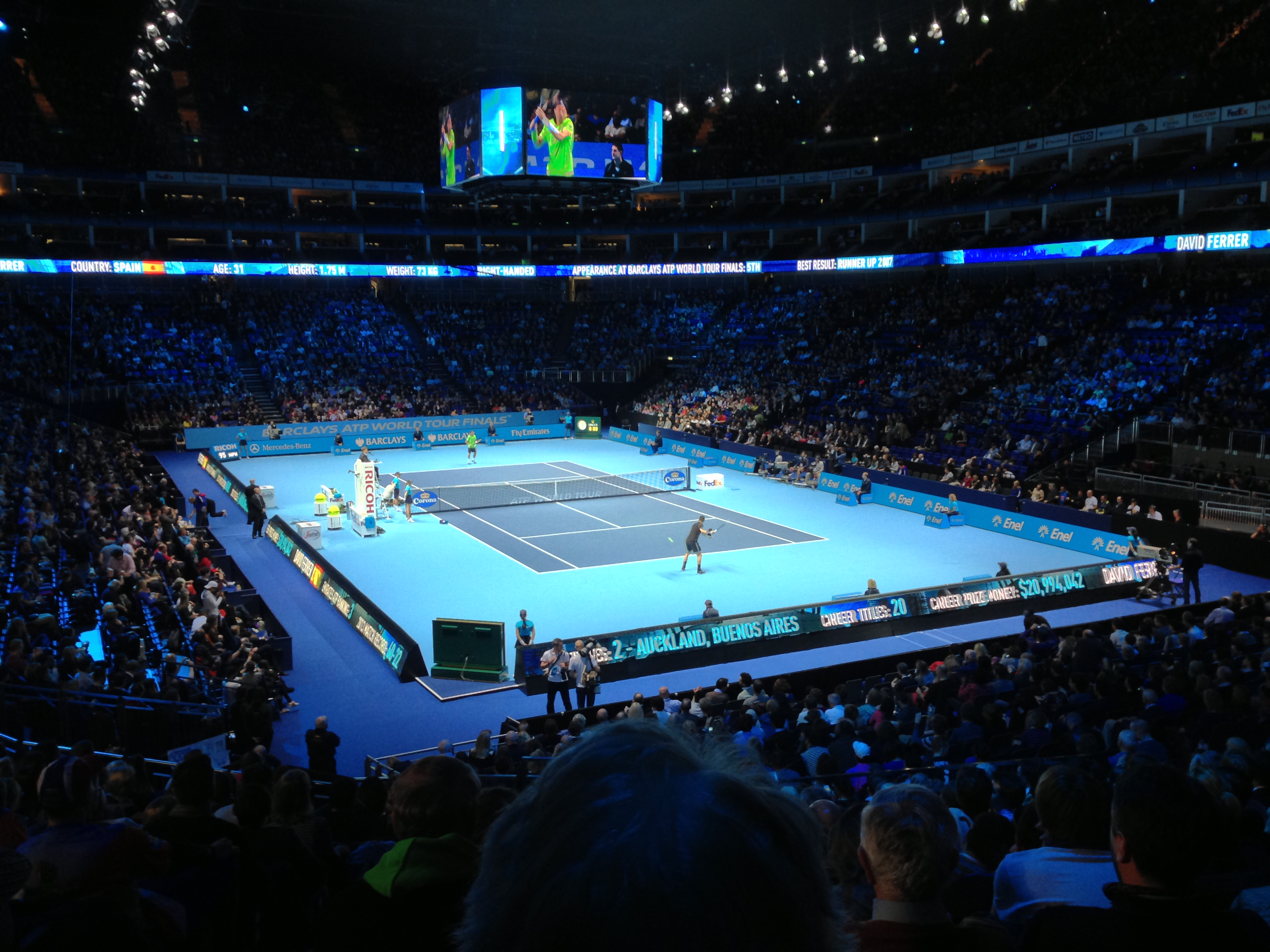
Singles play on the O_{2} Arena during the 2013 event

The 2013 ATP World Tour Finals took place from 4 to 11 November at the O_{2} Arena in London, United Kingdom.

It was the 44th edition of the tournament (39th in doubles). The tournament was run by the Association of Tennis Professionals (ATP) and was part of the 2013 ATP World Tour. The event took place on indoor hard courts. It served as the season-ending championships for players on the ATP Tour. The eight players who qualified for the event were split into two groups of four. During this stage, players competed in a round-robin format (meaning players played against all the other players in their group). The two players with the best results in each group progressed to the semifinals, where the winners of a group faced the runners-up of the other group. This stage, however, was a knock-out stage. The doubles competition used the same format.

=== Format ===
The Barclays ATP World Tour Finals had a round-robin format, with eight players/teams divided into two groups of four. The eight seeds were determined by the ATP rankings and ATP Doubles Team Rankings on the Monday after the last ATP World Tour tournament of the calendar year. All singles matches were the best of three tie-break sets, including the final. All doubles matches were two sets (no ad) and a Match Tie-break.

=== Draw ===
The top seeded players/teams were placed in Group A and the second seeded player/team were placed in Group B. Players/teams seeded 3 and 4, 5 and 6, 7 and 8, were then drawn in pairs with the first drawn placed in Group A. Each player/team played the three other players/teams in his group. The winner of each group (best overall record) was placed in separate semi-final brackets, with the top player/team in Group A playing the runner-up in Group B, and vice versa. Ties were broken by the Tie-Break Procedure.

== Points and prize money ==
| Stage | Singles | Doubles^{1} | Points |
|---|---|---|---|
| Champion | RR + $1,355,000 | RR +$210,500 | RR + 900 |
| Runner-up | RR + $445,000 | RR +$70,500 | RR + 400 |
| Round robin win per match | $142,000 | $27,000 | 200 |
| Participation fee | $142,000^{2} | $71,000^{3} | —N/a |
| Alternates | $80,000 | $27,000 | —N/a |

- RR is points or prize money won in the round robin stage.
- ^{1} Prize money for doubles is per team.
- ^{2} Pro-rated on a per-match basis: $80,000 = 1 match, $105,000 = 2 matches, $142,000 = 3 matches
- ^{3} 3 Pro-rated on a per-match basis: $27,000 = 1 match, $50,000 = 2 matches, $71,000 = 3 matches

== Qualification ==
The top eight players (or teams) with the most countable points accumulated in Grand Slam, ATP World Tour, and Davis Cup tournaments during the year qualify for the 2013 ATP World Tour Finals. Countable points include points earned in 2013, plus points earned at the 2012 Davis Cup final and the late-season 2012 Challengers played after the 2012 ATP World Tour Finals. To qualify, a player who finished in the 2012 year-end top 30 must compete in four Grand Slam tournaments and eight ATP World Tour Masters 1000 tournaments during 2013. They can count their best six results from ATP World Tour 500, ATP World Tour 250 and other events (Challengers, Futures, Davis Cup, Olympics) toward their ranking. To count their best six, players must have fulfilled their commitment to 500 events – 4 total per year (at least 1 after the US Open). Additionally, commitment players will no longer need to enter the 500 events 12 weeks in advance but instead go back the normal 6-week entry deadline. If eligible to play in one of the Grand Slam or ATP World Tour Masters 1000 tournaments, a player must count the points from these tournaments, even if it is 'a zero pointer' because he missed the event. Just as in Formula One and numerous other sports, if a competitor misses a race or an event, he loses his chance to earn points. Players with direct acceptance who do not play an ATP World Tour Masters 1000 tournament will be suspended from a subsequent ATP World Tour Masters 1000 event, which will be the next highest points earned ATP World Tour Masters 1000 event within the next 12 months. If an injured player is on site within the first three days of a tournament to conduct promotional activities over a two-day period, a suspension will not be enforced but a 0-pointer will be counted on a player's ranking. If a player does not play enough ATP 500 events and does not have an ATP 250 or Challenger appearance with a better result, the Davis Cup is counted in the 500s table (if the player entered or achieved better results). If a player does not play enough ATP 250 or Challenger events, the World Team Championship is counted in the 250s table (if the player entered or achieved better results). If a player could not be present in all required tournament classes (i.e. because of an injury), all uncounted ATP 250 or Challenger results are eligible to be included in his 18 valid tournaments. In teams rankings, Challenger points are excluded.

A player who is out of competition for 30 or more days, due to a verified injury, is not penalized. The 2013 ATP World Tour Finals counts as an additional 19th tournament in the ranking of its eight qualifiers at season's end, while the Davis Cup Final points count towards the next year's race.

== Contenders points breakdown ==
- Players in gold were the qualifiers.
- Player in bold won the title at the finals.
- Players in Seed is withdrew before the tournament.

=== Singles ===
| Sd | Rk | Player | Grand Slam | | | | ATP World Tour Masters 1000 | | | | | | | | Best Other | | | | | | Total points | Tours played |
|---|---|---|---|---|---|---|---|---|---|---|---|---|---|---|---|---|---|---|---|---|---|---|
| Sd | Rk | Player | **AO** | **FO** | **W** | **USO** | **IW** | **MI** | **MA** | **RO** | **CA** | **CI** | **SH** | **PA** | 1 | 2 | 3 | 4 | 5 | 6 | Total points | Tours played |
| 1 | 1 | (Spain) Rafael Nadal | A 0 | **W** **2,000** | R128; 10 | **W** **2,000** | **W** **1,000** | A 0 | **W** **1,000** | **W** **1,000** | **W** **1,000** | **W** **1,000** | SF; 360 | SF; 360 | F 600 | **W** **500** | **W** **500** | F 300 | **W** **250** | F 150 | 12,030 | 18 |
| 2 | 2 | (Serbia) Novak Djokovic | **W** **2,000** | SF; 720 | F 1,200 | F 1,200 | SF; 360 | R16; 90 | R32; 10 | QF; 180 | SF; 360 | QF; 180 | **W** **1,000** | **W** **1,000** | **W** **1,000** | **W** **500** | **W** **500** | DC; 310 | A 0 | | 10,610 | 16 |
| 3 | 3 | (Spain) David Ferrer | SF; 720 | F 1,200 | QF; 360 | QF; 360 | R64; 10 | F 600 | QF; 180 | QF; 180 | R32; 10 | R16; 90 | R16; 90 | F 600 | F 300 | F 300 | **W** **250** | **W** **250** | F 150 | DC; 150 | 5,800 | 22 |
| – | 4 | (United Kingdom) Andy Murray | F 1,200 | A 0 | **W** **2,000** | QF; 360 | QF; 180 | **W** **1,000** | QF; 180 | R32; 10 | R16; 90 | QF; 180 | A 0 | A 0 | **W** **250** | **W** **250** | R16; 90 | A 0 | A 0 | A 0 | 5,790 | 19 |
| 4 | 5 | (Argentina) Juan Martín del Potro | R32; 90 | A 0 | SF; 720 | R64; 45 | F 600 | R64; 10 | A 0 | R16; 90 | R16; 90 | SF; 360 | F 600 | QF; 180 | **W** **500** | **W** **500** | **W** **500** | **W** **500** | SF; 180 | R16; 90 | 5,055 | 18 |
| 5 | 6 | (Czech Republic) Tomáš Berdych | QF; 360 | R128; 10 | QF; 360 | R16; 180 | SF; 360 | QF; 180 | SF; 360 | SF; 360 | R16; 90 | SF; 360 | R16; 90 | QF; 180 | F 300 | DC; 220 | SF; 180 | F 150 | F 150 | R16; 90 | 3,980 | 21 |
| 6 | 7 | (Switzerland) Roger Federer | SF; 720 | QF; 360 | R64; 45 | R16; 180 | QF; 180 | A 0 | R16; 90 | F 600 | A 0 | QF; 180 | R16; 90 | SF; 360 | F 300 | **W** **250** | SF; 180 | SF; 180 | QF; 90 | R16; 0 | 3,805 | 17 |
| 7 | 8 | (Switzerland) Stanislas Wawrinka | R16; 180 | QF; 360 | R128; 10 | SF; 720 | R16; 90 | A 0 | F 600 | R32; 45 | R32; 10 | R32; 45 | QF; 180 | QF; 180 | **W** **250** | QF; 180 | F 150 | F 150 | SF; 90 | SF; 90 | 3,330 | 22 |
| 8 | 9 | (France) Richard Gasquet | R16; 180 | R16; 180 | R32; 90 | SF; 720 | R16; 90 | SF; 360 | R32; 10 | R16; 90 | QF; 180 | R32; 10 | R64; 10 | QF; 180 | **W** **250** | **W** **250** | **W** **250** | SF; 180 | QF; 180 | SF; 90 | 3,300 | 22 |
**Alternates**
| 9 | 10 | (France) Jo-Wilfried Tsonga | QF; 360 | SF; 720 | R64; 45 | A 0 | QF; 180 | R16; 90 | QF; 180 | R32; 10 | A 0 | A 0 | SF; 360 | R32; 10 | SF; 360 | **W** **250** | DC; 170 | F 150 | SF; 90 | SF; 90 | 3,065 | 20 |
| 10 | 11 | (Canada) Milos Raonic | R16; 180 | R32; 90 | R64; 45 | R16; 180 | R16; 90 | R32; 45 | R32; 45 | R64; 10 | F 600 | R16; 90 | R16; 90 | R16; 90 | F 300 | DC; 280 | **W** **250** | **W** **250** | SF; 180 | R16; 45 | 2,860 | 23 |

=== Doubles ===
| Rank | Team | Points | | | | | | | | | | | | | | | | | | Total Points | Tours |
| Rank | Team | 1 | 2 | 3 | 4 | 5 | 6 | 7 | 8 | 9 | 10 | 11 | 12 | 13 | 14 | 15 | 16 | 17 | 18 | Total Points | Tours |
|---|---|---|---|---|---|---|---|---|---|---|---|---|---|---|---|---|---|---|---|---|---|
| 1 | (United States) Bob Bryan (United States) Mike Bryan | **W** **2,000** | **W** **2,000** | **W** **2,000** | **W** **1,000** | **W** **1,000** | **W** **1,000** | **W** **1,000** | **W** **1,000** | SF; 720 | F 600 | **W** **500** | SF; 360 | F 300 | **W** **250** | **W** **250** | QF; 180 | F 150 | QF; 45 | 14,365 | 21 |
| 2 | (Austria) Alexander Peya (Brazil) Bruno Soares | F 1,200 | **W** **1,000** | SF; 720 | F 600 | F 600 | **W** **500** | **W** **500** | SF; 360 | F 300 | **W** **250** | **W** **250** | R16; 180 | QF; 180 | SF; 180 | SF; 180 | F 150 | R32; 90 | QF; 45 | 7,240 | 23 |
| 3 | (Croatia) Ivan Dodig (Brazil) Marcelo Melo | F 1,200 | **W** **1,000** | SF; 720 | SF; 360 | R16; 180 | QF; 180 | QF; 180 | R16; 90 | QF; 90 | QF; 90 | QF; 45 | R64; 0 | R32; 0 | R16; 0 | R16; 0 | R16; 0 | R16; 0 | R16; 0 | 4,045 | 18 |
| 4 | (Spain) Marcel Granollers (Spain) Marc López | SF; 720 | F 600 | SF; 360 | QF; 360 | R16; 180 | SF; 180 | SF; 180 | QF; 180 | QF; 180 | QF; 180 | QF; 180 | SF; 90 | QF; 90 | QF; 90 | QF; 90 | DC; 50 | R64; 0 | R16; 0 | 3,710 | 23 |
| 5 | (Pakistan) Aisam-ul-Haq Qureshi (Netherlands) Jean-Julien Rojer | **W** **1,000** | QF; 360 | **W** **250** | QF; 180 | QF; 180 | QF; 180 | QF; 180 | R16; 180 | R16; 180 | R16; 180 | F 150 | F 150 | SF; 90 | QF; 90 | QF; 45 | R32; 0 | R16; 0 | R16; 0 | 3,305 | 27 |
| 6 | (Spain) David Marrero (Spain) Fernando Verdasco | F 600 | SF; 360 | SF; 360 | QF; 360 | QF; 360 | **W** **250** | SF; 180 | SF; 180 | QF; 180 | SF; 90 | SF; 90 | QF; 90 | QF; 90 | R16; 90 | QF; 45 | QF; 45 | R16; 0 | R64; 0 | 3,280 | 20 |
| 7 | (India) Leander Paes (Czech Republic) Radek Štěpánek | **W** **2,000** | SF; 720 | QF; 180 | QF; 45 | QF; 45 | R16; 0 | R64; 0 | | | | | | | | | | | | 2,990 | 7 |
| 8 | (Poland) Mariusz Fyrstenberg (Poland) Marcin Matkowski | F 600 | **W** **500** | SF; 360 | QF; 360 | QF; 180 | SF; 180 | SF; 180 | QF; 90 | QF; 90 | QF; 90 | R16; 90 | R16; 90 | R16; 90 | QF; 45 | R64; 0 | R64; 0 | R32; 0 | R32; 0 | 2,955 | 22 |

== Qualified players ==
=== Singles ===
| # | Players | Points | Tours | Date Qualified |
|---|---|---|---|---|
| 1 | Rafael Nadal (ESP) | 11,760 | 16 | 10 June |
| 2 | Novak Djokovic (SRB) | 9,700 | 15 | 19 August |
| inj | Andy Murray (GBR) | 5,805 | 13 | 10 September |
| 3 | David Ferrer (ESP) | 5,290 | 22 | 7 October |
| 4 | Juan Martín del Potro (ARG) | 4,965 | 16 | 12 October |
| 5 | Tomáš Berdych (CZE) | 3,890 | 21 | 23 October |
| 6 | Roger Federer (SUI) | 3,535 | 15 | 30 October |
| 7 | Stanislas Wawrinka (SUI) | 3,330 | 24 | 31 October |
| 8 | Richard Gasquet (FRA) | 3,210 | 24 | 31 October |

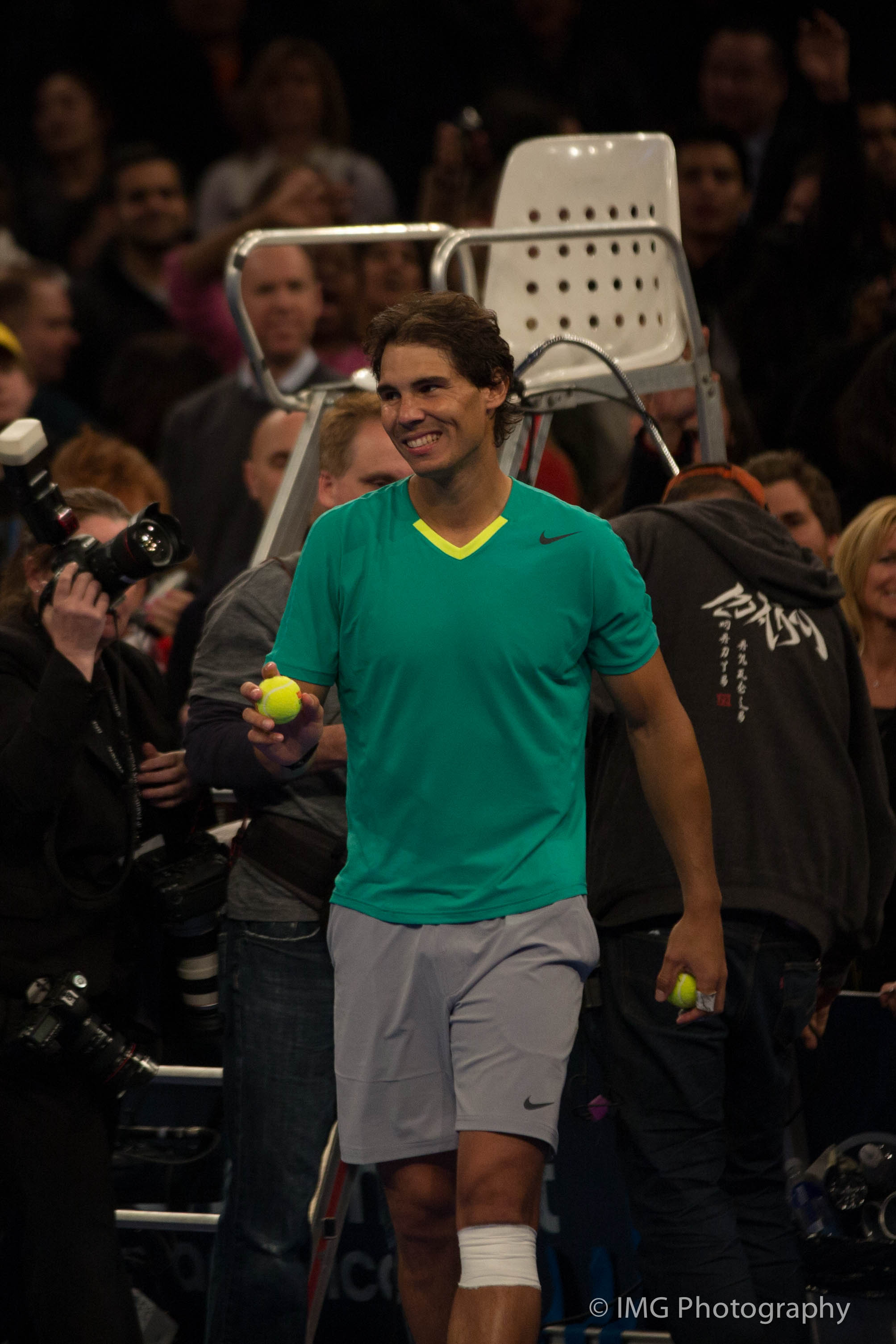
Rafael Nadal wins his 8th French Open and 2nd US Open titles, overtaking Roy Emerson for third most Major titles overall.

On 10 June, following his record-breaking eighth title at the French Open, Rafael Nadal became the first to qualify.

Rafael Nadal had one of his strongest starts to an ATP World Tour season, reaching nine finals in as many tournaments after having been sidelined for seven months with a knee injury that forced him to miss the majority of the 2012 season. He began his year at the VTR Open after missing the Australian Open due to illness. He reached the final before being defeated by Horacio Zeballos. This was followed up by winning three consecutive tournaments, at the Brazil Open defeating David Nalbandian., the Abierto Mexicano Telcel defeating world No. 4 David Ferrer, losing just two games in the match, and at BNP Paribas Open defeating Juan Martín del Potro. At Monte-Carlo Masters, Nadal made it to his ninth consecutive final at the event, and fifth of the year, where he met world no. 1 Novak Djokovic, Nadal lost in straight sets, recording his first defeat at the event since 2004. Nadal then went on to defend his titles at the Barcelona Open defeating Nicolás Almagro, Internazionali BNL d'Italia defeating Roger Federer, and the French Open defeating David Ferrer for Nadal's record 8th Roland Garros title, as well as winning the title at the Mutua Madrid Open defeating Stanislas Wawrinka. However at Wimbledon, Nadal suffered his earliest ever defeat at a Grand Slam tournament, losing to Belgian Steve Darcis in the first round. He then returned to form, winning for the third time at the Rogers Cup defeating Canadian Milos Raonic. He then became only the fourth player to win Canada & Cincinnati in the same year, beating American John Isner in the final of Western & Southern Open. Nadal then defeated Djokovic in the final of the US Open for his second title at the event. Nadal lost his first hardcourt match of the season at the final of the China Open to Djokovic, but still claimed the number 1 ranking from Djokovic. This is the ninth time Nadal has qualified for the ATP finals.

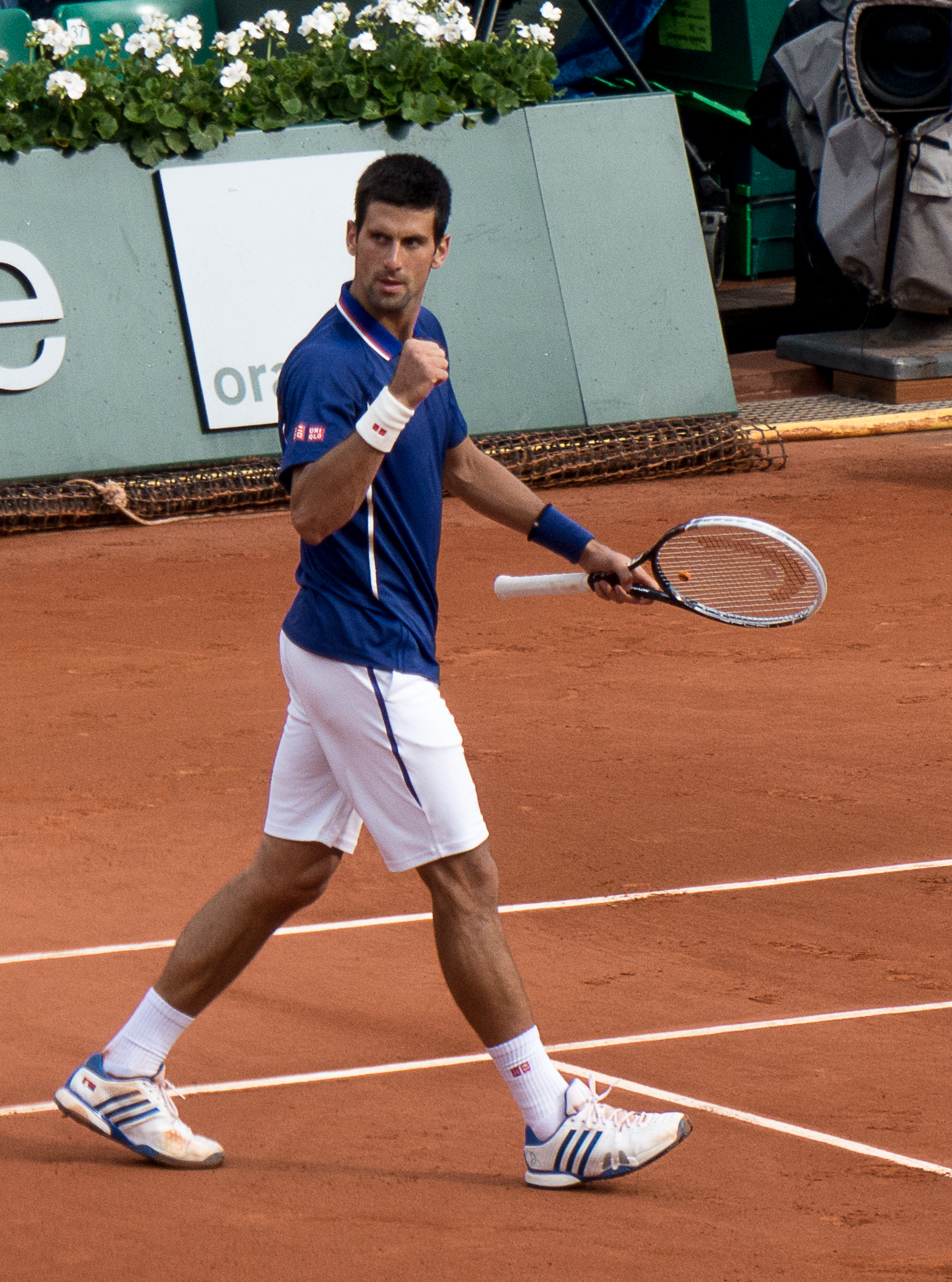
Novak Djokovic wins his third consecutive and fourth Australian Open title.

On 19 August, defending champion Novak Djokovic was announced as the second to qualify.

Novak Djokovic began the year by reaching the final of the Hopman Cup with Ana Ivanovic but lost to Anabel Medina Garrigues and Fernando Verdasco. He then won his third consecutive title at the Australian Open defeating Andy Murray in four sets, becoming the first man in the open era to win three consecutive times in Melbourne. Djokovic won his fourth title at the Dubai Tennis Championships defeating Tomáš Berdych in straight sets. Djokovic won his first ATP Masters 1000 event of the year, defeating Rafael Nadal in the final of the Monte-Carlo Masters, ending the Spaniards 8-year unbeaten run at the event, and becoming the first man in history to win 8 of the 9 Masters series events. At the French Open, Djokovic made it to the semifinals for the 3rd straight year, however lost to Nadal in a 5 set epic 9–7 in the fifth. At Wimbledon, Djokovic made it to his second final at the event, but lost to Andy Murray in straight sets, the first time since 2010 that he had failed to win a set in a Grand Slam match. Djokovic then reached his fourth straight US Open final but for the third time he ended up losing, this time to Nadal in four sets. Djokovic then remained undefeated at the China Open defeating Nadal in straight sets, claiming his fourth title in five years and his first title in over 6 months. Djokovic then defended his Shanghai Rolex Masters title by defeating del Potro in a third set tiebreak, thus having a 20 match winning streak in China. He won his third consecutive title at the BNP Paribas Masters defeating world no. 3 David Ferrer in the final, his sixth title of the year and extends his winning streak to 17. Djokovic represented the Serbia Davis Cup team in 2013 and was instrumental in their push to the final against Czech Republic. This is Djokovic's seventh straight appearance at the year-end finals.

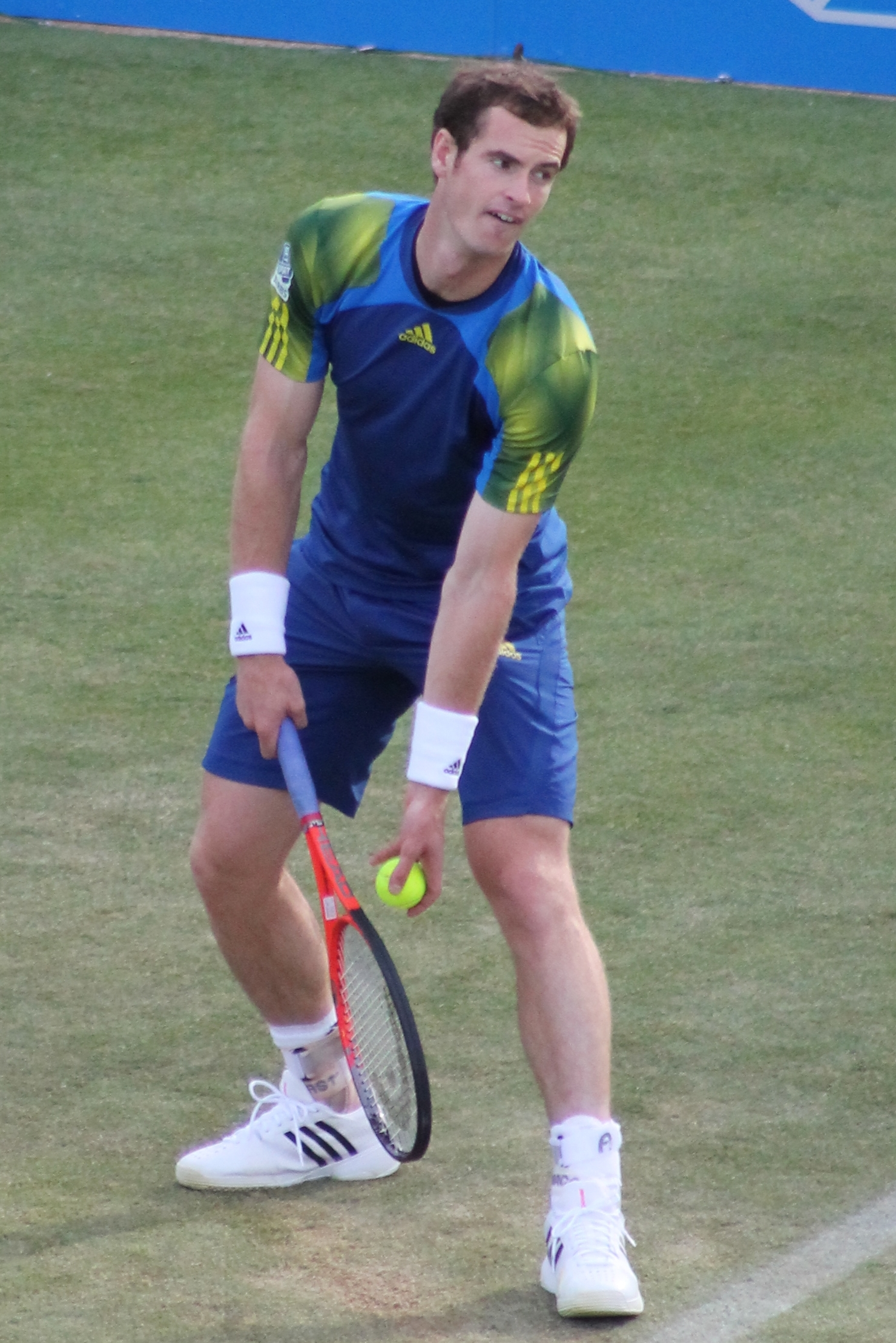
Andy Murray became the first British Male singles champion at Wimbledon in the Open Era.

On 10 September, following the conclusion of the US Open, Andy Murray became the third player to qualify.

Andy Murray started his year strongly, defending his title at the Brisbane International defeating Bulgarian Grigor Dimitrov, and reaching the final of the Australian Open, losing to defending champion Novak Djokovic in 4 sets. He won his second title of the year at the Sony Open Tennis, defeating David Ferrer in the final, saving match point in the process. He then pulled out of the French Open after a difficult clay court season, citing a back injury. This was the first time he'd missed a Grand Slam event since 2007, when he had to miss both Roland Garros and Wimbledon. Following his return from injury, Murray came back strong, and had his best ever grass court season, winning the Aegon Championships defeating defending champion Marin Čilić, and then going on to end a 77-year wait for a British male singles champion at Wimbledon, defeating Djokovic in straight sets to clinch his second major trophy, and maintain his 18-match winning streak on grass. The recurrence of his back injury meant that Murray struggled during the North American hard court season, exiting the Rogers Cup and Western & Southern Open in the third round and quarterfinals respectively. Murray entered the US Open as defending champion, however fell at the quarterfinal stage to Stanislas Wawrinka in straight sets, after having struggled against his previous three opponents. This is Murray's sixth consecutive time to qualify for the season finale, however following surgery on a long-standing back problem, Murray withdrew in order to recover.

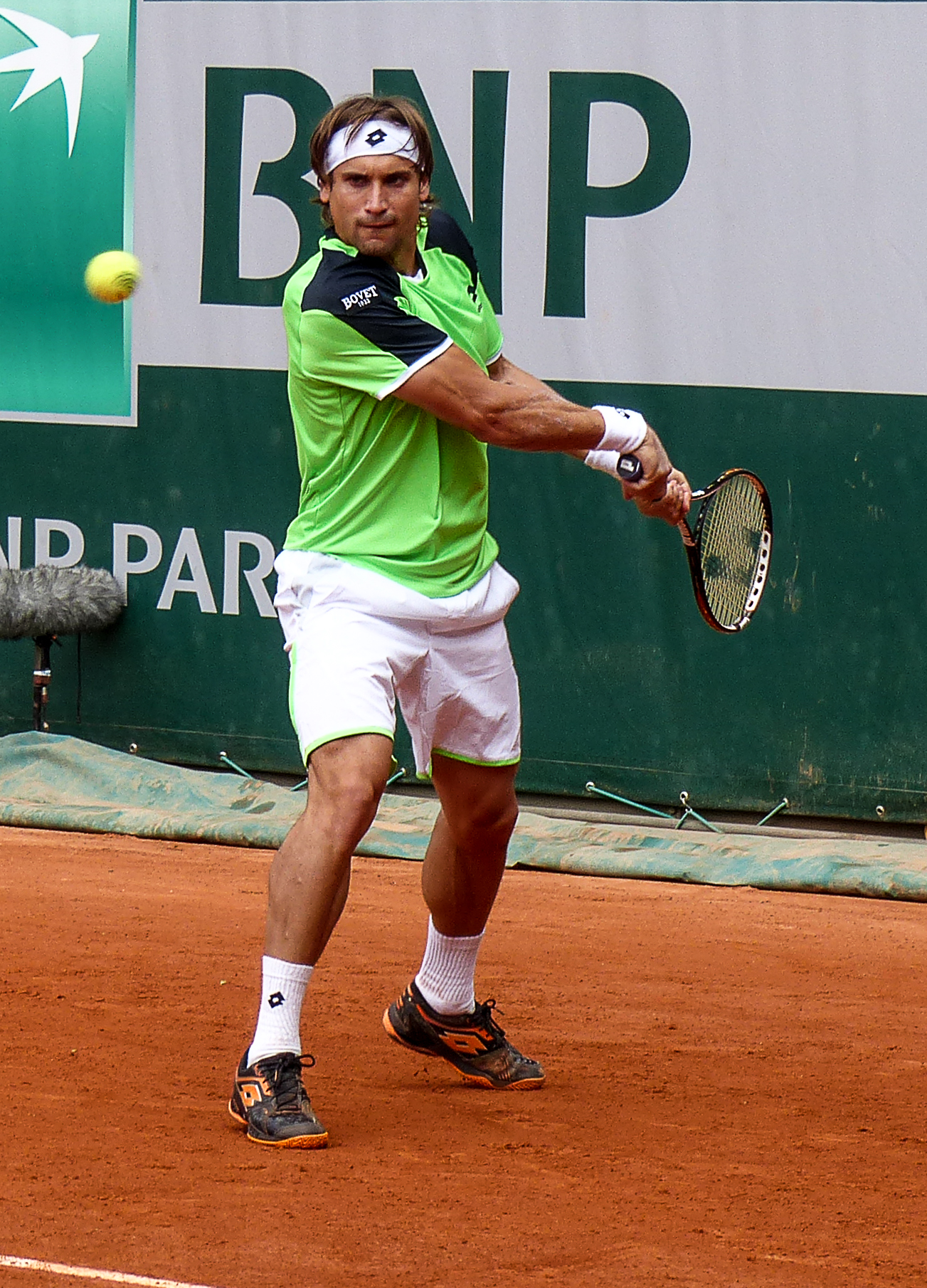
David Ferrer reaches his first slam final at the French Open.

On 7 October, after the conclusion of the China Open, David Ferrer was announced as the fourth qualifier.

David Ferrer had a breakthrough in 2013 reaching his first slam final and reaching a career high ranking of number 3. He began his year by winning the Heineken Open for the fourth time and third consecutive year defeating Philipp Kohlschreiber in straight sets. At the Australian Open, he reached the semifinals but lost to world no. 1 Novak Djokovic in three easy sets. Ferrer then won his second title of the year at the Copa Claro defeating Stanislas Wawrinka in three sets. At the Abierto Mexicano Telcel as the defending champion, he fell in the final to Rafael Nadal winning just two games. He then reached the final of the Sony Open Tennis but fell to Andy Murray in a third set tie-break despite having a match point. Ferrer reached his fifth final of the year at the Portugal Open facing Wawrinka, but this time falling in straight sets to the Swiss. At the French Open, Ferrer reached his first slam final facing compatriot Nadal, in the first all-Spanish slam final since 2002, but lost in three straight sets. At Wimbledon, he fell to Argentinian Juan Martín del Potro in three sets. At the US Open, he lost for the first time to Richard Gasquet in the quarterfinals in five sets despite taking the 3rd and 4th sets, in his first loss since 2008 to the Frenchman. He then reached another final, at the If Stockholm Open facing Grigor Dimitrov but lost in three sets, to hand the Bulgarian his first title. Ferrer then followed it up with another final appearance at the Valencia Open 500, where he is the defending champion, however he fell to Russian Mikhail Youzhny in straight sets. He reached his third final in as many weeks at the BNP Paribas Masters, where he is the defending champion after defeating world no. 1 Rafael Nadal, ending his 9 match losing streak to the Spaniard. However, he lost to Novak Djokovic in straight sets, despite serving for each set in the tenth game. This is Ferrer's 7th consecutive loss in a final. This is fifth time Ferrer has qualified for the Tour Finals.

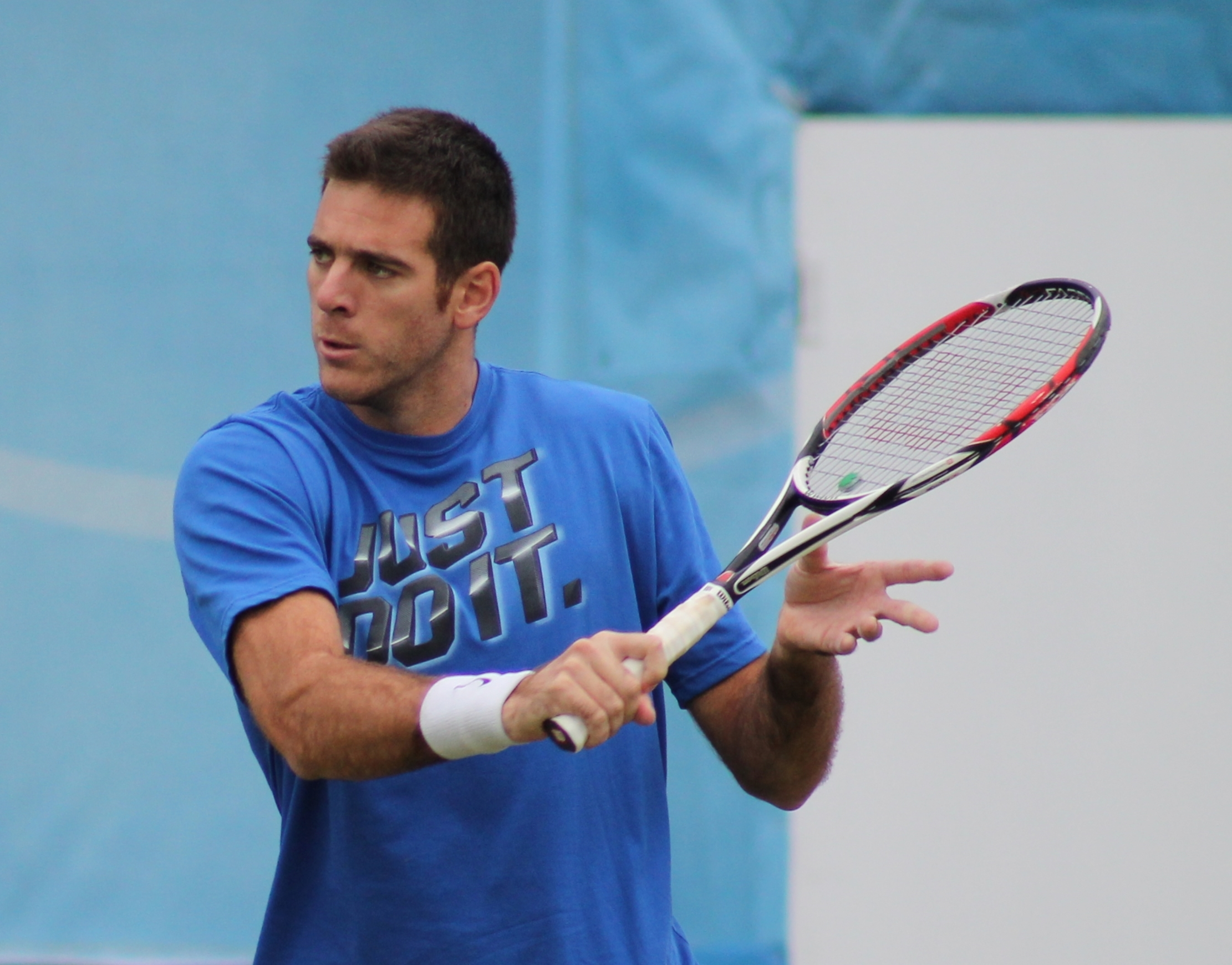
Juan Martín del Potro qualifies for the fourth time.

On 12 October, Juan Martín del Potro qualified as a result of reaching the final of the Shanghai Masters.

Juan Martín del Potro had a shaky start to the season, losing in the third round of the Australian Open in five sets to Jérémy Chardy. However he rebounded from this loss to win the ABN AMRO World Tennis Tournament, defeating Frenchman Julien Benneteau in the final in straight sets. He then made it to his second Masters 1000 final at the BNP Paribas Open defeating Andy Murray and Djokovic, ultimately losing to Spaniard Rafael Nadal in three sets. A virus hampered the majority of his clay court season, leading to him pulling out of both the Madrid Masters and the French Open. He rebounded well, having his best run at Wimbledon Championships defeating David Ferrer en route to the semifinals, but lost Djokovic in five sets in what was the longest ever semifinal at Wimbledon, surpassing the record set by Boris Becker and Ivan Lendl in 1989. In the American hard court swing, del Potro began strongly by winning the Citi Open, defeating American John Isner in the final from a set down. At the US Open, del Potro lost in the second round to former no. 1 Lleyton Hewitt. He won his third title of the year in Rakuten Japan Open Tennis Championships, defeating Canadian Milos Raonic in the final. At the Shanghai Rolex Masters, he reached the final but lost again to Djokovic in a third set tie-break. In a repeat of previous year's final at the Swiss Indoors, del Potro faced Roger Federer in the final, and replicated the result winning in three sets. This is the fourth time del Potro has qualified for the year-end finals.

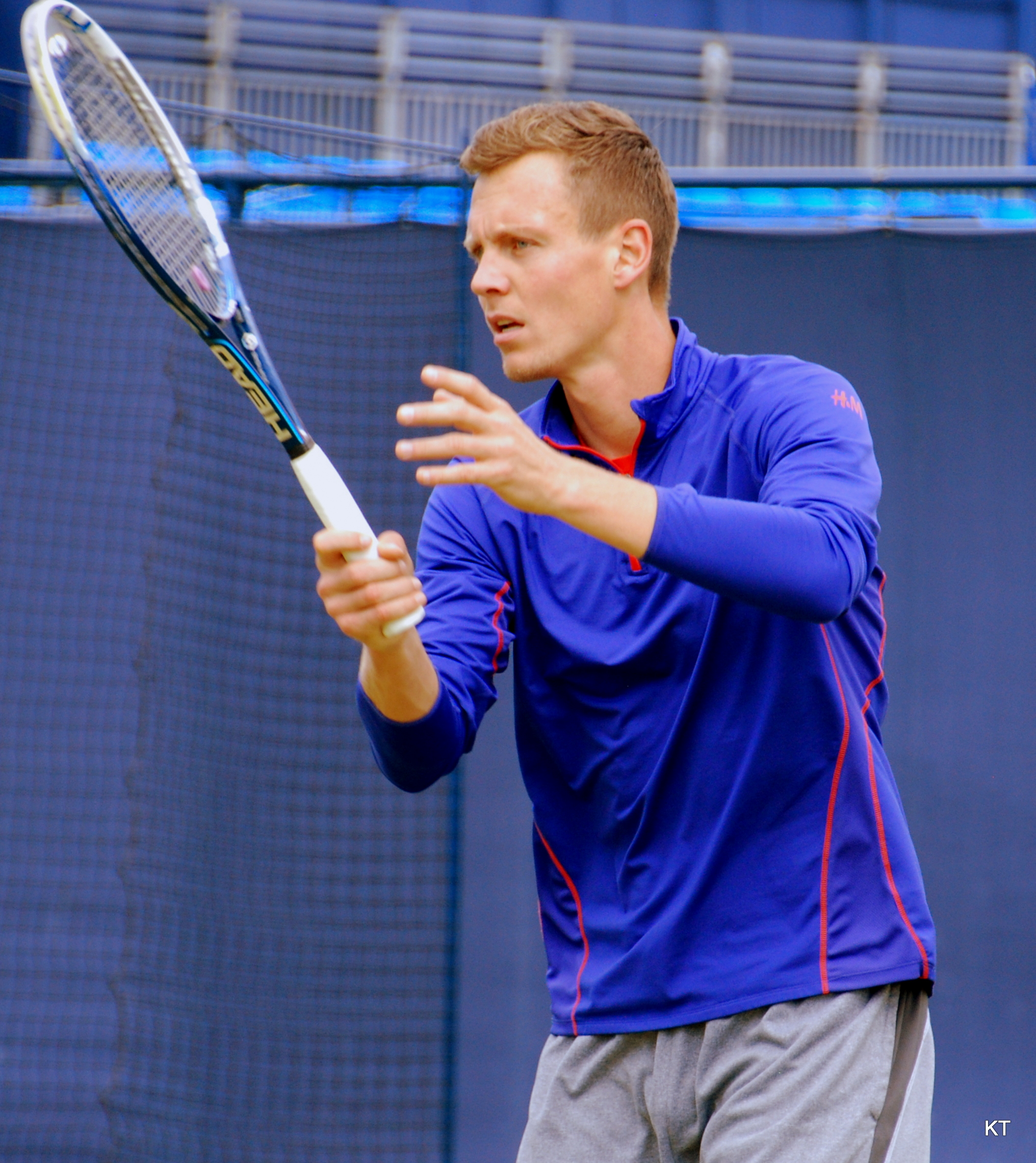
Tomáš Berdych qualifies for the fourth time.

On 23 October, Top ranked Czech Tomáš Berdych was announced as the fifth qualifier.

Tomáš Berdych broke into the top 5 for the first time in his career. Berdych failed to win a title in the year, but reached three finals. He made back-to-back finals at the Open 13 and at the Dubai Tennis Championships losing to Jo-Wilfried Tsonga in three sets despite having match point and to Novak Djokovic in straight sets, respectively. He reached his third final at the PTT Thailand Open falling to Canadian Milos Raonic in two tight sets. At the slams, his best performance are at the quarterfinals of the Australian Open and Wimbledon Championships losing to Djokovic in both occasions, in four and three sets respectively. At the US Open, he reached the fourth round losing to Stanislas Wawrinka in four sets. At the French Open, he was upset in the first round by Frenchman Gaël Monfils 5–7 in the fifth set. He also helped the Czech Davis Cup team to go through to the final, to have a shot at their second consecutive title. This is the fourth consecutive year Berdych has qualified for the year-end finals.

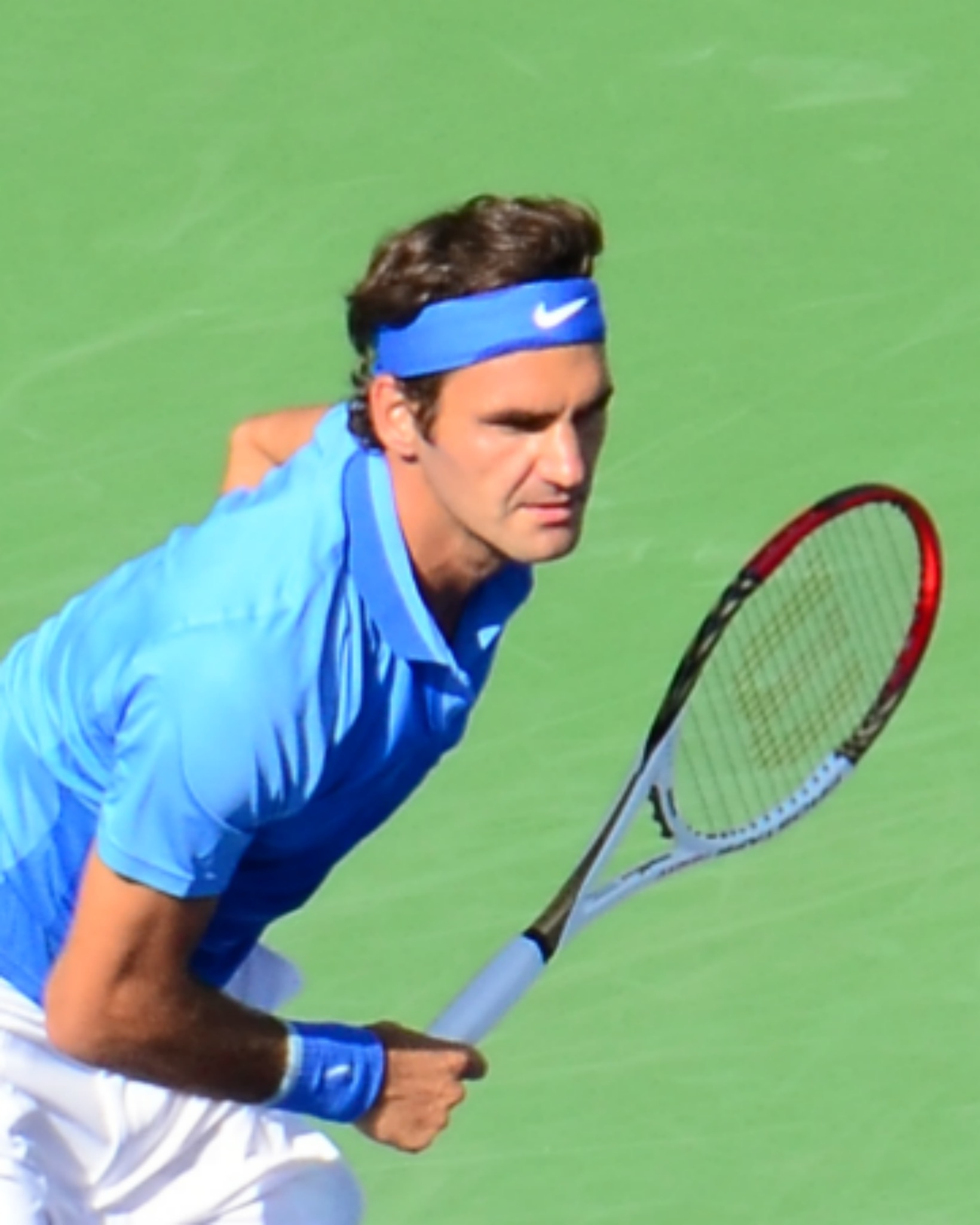
The six-time champion Roger Federer qualifies for the twelfth consecutive year.

On 30 October, following his second round victory in Paris, Roger Federer became the sixth player to qualify.

Roger Federer began the year as the world number 2, and began his year strongly, making it to the semifinals at the Australian Open before losing to Andy Murray in a 5-set thriller, despite coming back twice from a set down. However, he didn't reach his first final of the season until the Internazionali BNL d'Italia, losing to Rafael Nadal in straight sets. At the French Open, Federer reached the quarterfinals but was upset by Jo-Wilfried Tsonga in straight sets. During the grass court season, Federer won his only title of the season, defeating Mikhail Youzhny in the final of the Gerry Weber Open in three sets. However at Wimbledon, where Federer was defending champion, the Swiss suffered his worst Grand Slam defeat in over a decade, falling to world number 116 Sergiy Stakhovsky in the second round, bringing an end to his record streak of 36 consecutive quarterfinal appearances in slams. As a result of this loss, Federer fell outside of the top 4 for the first time since 2003. At the US Open, Federer reached the fourth round before losing to Tommy Robredo in straight sets, this is Federer's first loss to Robredo after 10 consecutive wins and the first year since 2002 that Federer did not reach a slam final. Federer reached his third final of the season at the Swiss Indoors, in a repeat of the previous years final against Juan Martín del Potro. Despite coming back form a set down, Federer ultimately fell to del Potro in the final set. This is the 12th straight year Federer has qualified for the year-end finals, tying with Ivan Lendl for the most consecutive appearances, and second most appearances in total at the event.

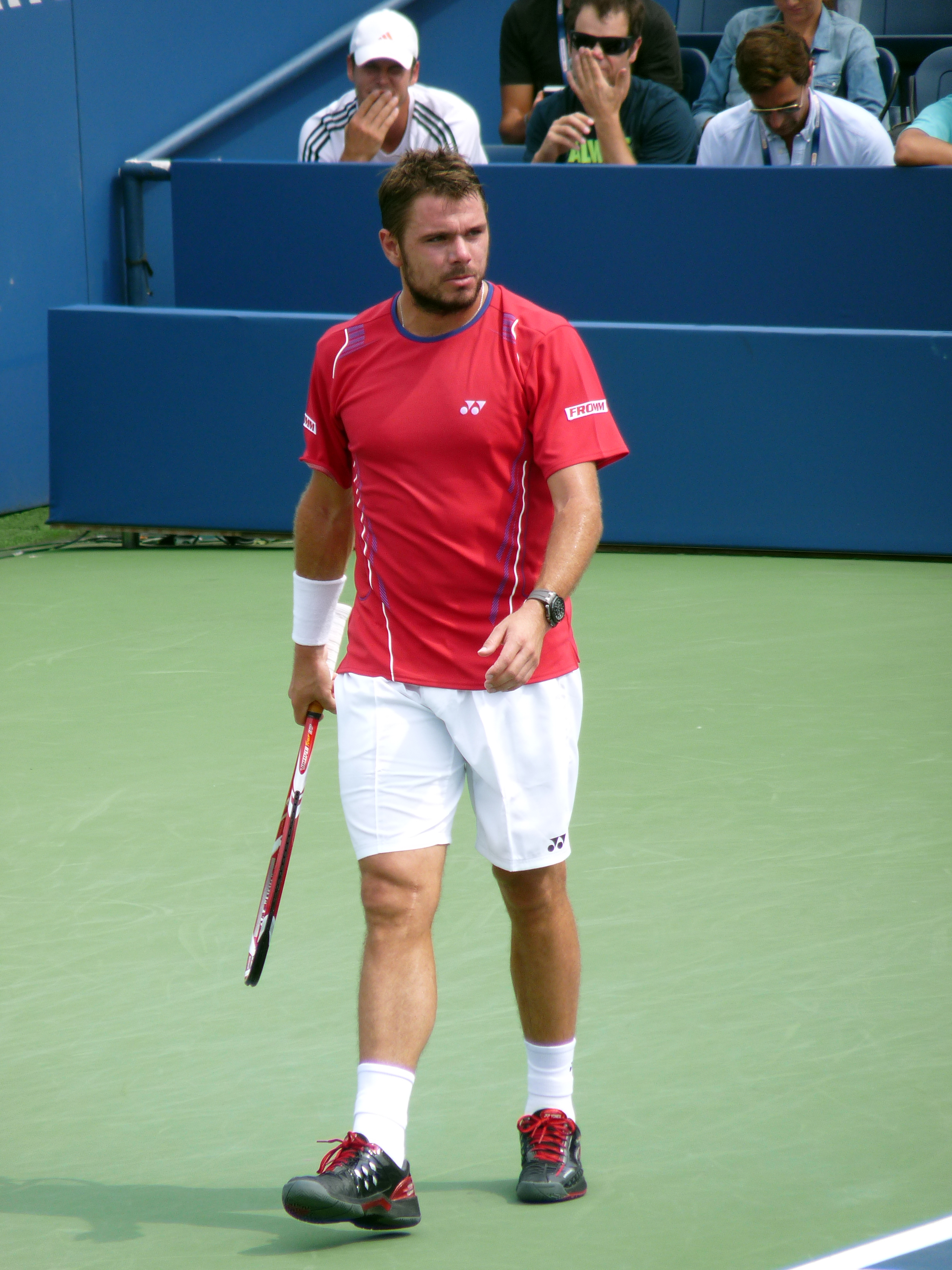
Stanislas Wawrinka reaches his first slam semifinal.

On 31 October, following the defeats of Milos Raonic to Tomáš Berdych, Stanislas Wawrinka and Richard Gasquet took the final two spots.

Stanislas Wawrinka is having his best year on the ATP Tour to date, reaching a career high ranking of number 8 in the world. He began the year with a fourth round showing at the Australian Open, losing in a 5 set thriller against Novak Djokovic losing 12–10 in the fifth, in a match that lasted over five hours. He also reached his first slam semifinal at the US Open defeating defending champion Andy Murray in the quarterfinals in straight sets, before losing to world no. 1 Djokovic in a tightly contested 5 setter despite having a two sets to one lead. He also reached the quarterfinals of the French Open losing to eventual champion Rafael Nadal, winning only 6 games. The Swiss won his lone title of the year at the Portugal Open, defeating Spaniard David Ferrer in the final. Wawrinka reached his first Masters 1000 final since 2008 at the clay courts of Mutua Madrid Open losing to Nadal. He also reached the finals of the Copa Claro and the Topshelf Open losing to Ferrer in three sets and Nicolas Mahut in straight sets, respectively. At Wimbledon, the Swiss drew former world no. 8 Jürgen Melzer in the first round and lost 8–6 in the final set. This is Wawrinka's first ever appearance at the season finale.

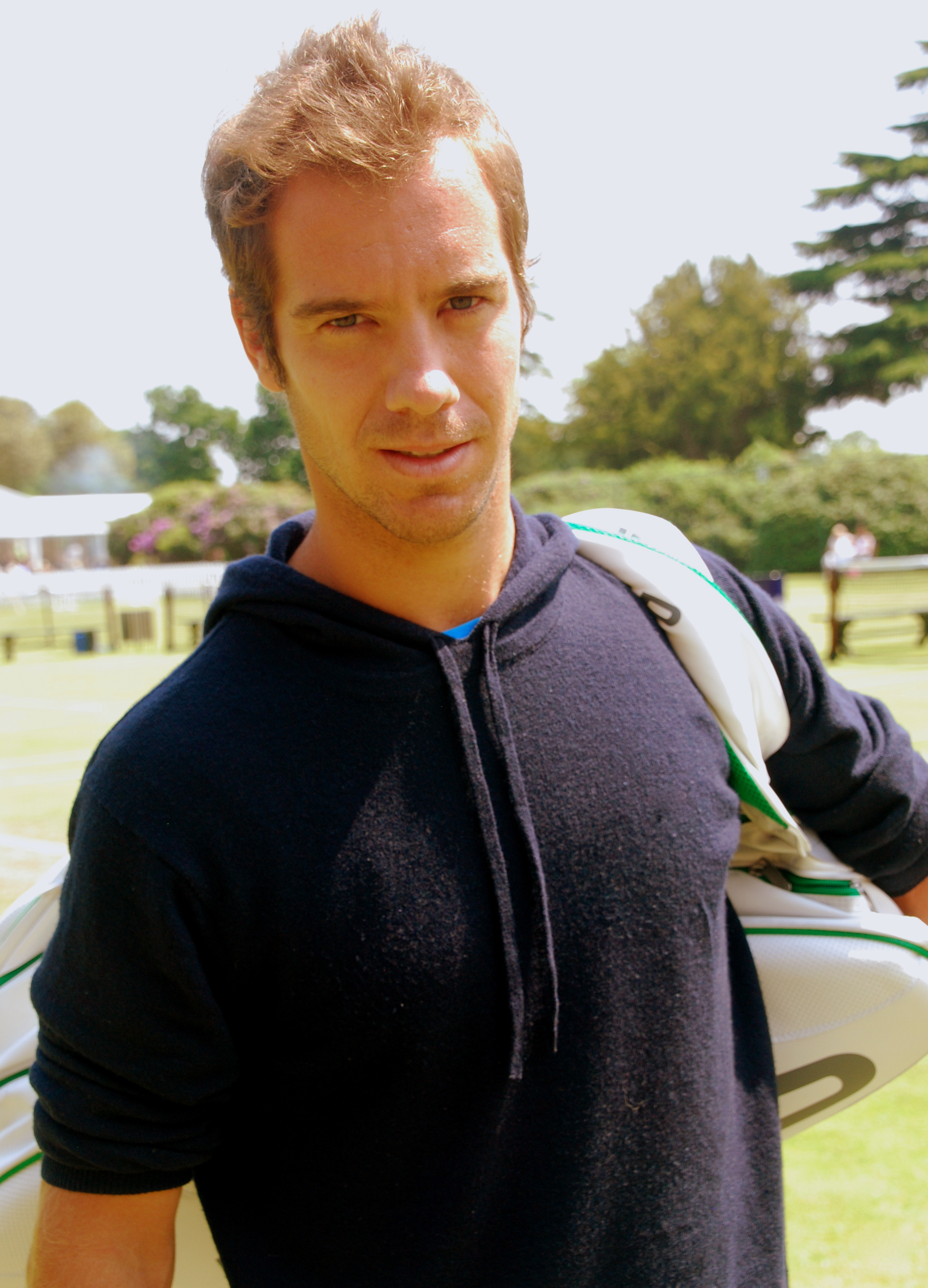
Richard Gasquet wins three titles in the year.

Richard Gasquet is having a resurgence in 2013. He began the year by winning the Qatar Open defeating Russian Nikolay Davydenko from a set down. At the Australian Open but lost to compatriot Jo-Wilfried Tsonga in four sets. However, he followed it up with another title at Open Sud de France over another Frenchman in Benoît Paire in straight sets. At the French Open, he reached another fourth round falling to Stanislas Wawrinka in a tough 5 setter, with the Swiss taking the fifth set 8–6, despite Gasquet taking the first two sets. His 6 consecutive fourth round appearance at a slam ended at Wimbledon, when he fell into the third round to Australian Bernard Tomic in four tight sets. At the US Open, the Frenchman reached his first slam semifinal since 2007 Wimbledon, when he defeated David Ferrer in five sets, in his first win over the Spaniard in five years. However, he lost in the final four to eventual champion Rafael Nadal in straight sets He won his third title of the year at the Kremlin Cup defeating Mikhail Kukushkin, this the most he has won since winning three as well in 2006. This is the Frenchman's second appearance at the Tour Finals, his first since 2007.

The first of the alternate spots went to Frenchman Jo-Wilfried Tsonga. Tsonga reached two finals in the year both in France at the Open 13 where he defeated Tomáš Berdych in three sets and at the Moselle Open where he lost to compatriot Gilles Simon in straight sets. Tsonga reached his first French Open semifinal defeating Roger Federer in straight sets, before losing to David Ferrer in straight sets. The second alternate spot was occupied by Canadian Milos Raonic, who broke through the top 10 for the first time. The Canadian won two titles in the year at the SAP Open defeating Tommy Haas for his third consecutive title at the event and at the PTT Thailand Open defeating Berdych, both wins were in straight sets. He reached his first Masters 100 final at the Rogers Cup losing to Rafael Nadal, winning just two games each set. He reached his fourth final at Rakuten Japan Open Tennis Championships, but lost to Juan Martín del Potro in two tight sets.

=== Doubles ===
| # | Players | Points | Tours | Date Qualified |
|---|---|---|---|---|
| 1 | Bob Bryan (USA); Mike Bryan (USA) | 13,065 | 19 | 10 June |
| 2 | Alexander Peya (AUT); Bruno Soares (BRA) | 6,230 | 21 | 10 September |
| 3 | Ivan Dodig (CRO); Marcelo Melo (BRA) | 3,775 | 17 | 21 October |
| 4 | Marcel Granollers (ESP); Marc López (ESP) | 3,620 | 21 | 21 October |
| 5 | Aisam-ul-Haq Qureshi (PAK); Jean-Julien Rojer (NED) | 3,305 | 27 | 31 October |
| 6 | David Marrero (ESP); Fernando Verdasco (ESP) | 3,280 | 20 | 31 October |
| 7 | Leander Paes (IND); Radek Štěpánek (CZE) | 2,990 | 7 | 10 September |
| 8 | Mariusz Fyrstenberg (POL); Marcin Matkowski (POL) | 2,955 | 15 | 2 November |

The first team that qualified was the team of Bob Bryan and Mike Bryan on 10 June.

Bob Bryan & Mike Bryan began the year winning back-to-back titles in the Apia International Sydney over Mirnyi/Tecău and the Australian Open over Dutch pairing of Haase/Sijsling, making a record of most slams by a doubles team. They then won consecutive titles at the U.S. National Indoor Tennis Championships defeating compatriot Blake/Sock and BNP Paribas Open defeating Huey/Janowicz in a match tie-break. They then reached the final of the U.S. Men's Clay Court Championships and the Monte-Carlo Rolex Masters, losing to Murray/Peers and Benneteau/Zimonjić, respectively in three sets. They then went on to a 25 match winning streak, capturing five titles in the process. They won title at the Mutua Madrid Open beating Peya/Soares, Internazionali BNL d'Italia beating Indian pairing of Bhupathi/Bopanna, French Open beating Frenchmen Llodra/Mahut in a third set tie-break, Aegon Championships beating Peya/Soares, and Wimbledon beating Dodig/Melo in four sets, giving them the Golden Slam, being the holder of all four slams and the Olympic gold simultaneously. Their streak ended in the quarterfinals of the Rogers Cup losing to Nestor/Lindstedt. They then won their tenth title at the Western & Southern Open defeating the Spanish pair of Granollers/López Coming into the US Open, the Bryans were aiming to be the first team since Ken McGregor and Frank Sedgman in 1951 to win the "calendar year grand slam", however they lost in the semifinals to Paes/Štěpánek ending their 28 match winning streak in slams. They then reached their 12 final of the year at the Valencia Open 500 but lost to defending champions Peya/Soares in a Match tie-break despite having 4 match points. They won their 11th title of the year at the final Masters event at the BNP Paribas Masters defeating Peya/Soares in straight sets. This is the 10th time the Bryan Brothers have qualified for the year-end finals.

On 10 September, US Open finalists Alexander Peya & Bruno Soares, and Leander Paes & Radek Štěpánek were announced as next two qualifiers.

Alexander Peya & Bruno Soares produced a breakthrough year in 2013. They won their first title of the year at the Brasil Open defeating Čermák/Mertiňák They then won the Barcelona Open defeating Lindstedt/Nestor saving 1 match point. They then reached their 3rd and 4th final losing to Bryan/Bryan at the Mutua Madrid Open and the Aegon Championships respectively. They then claimed their third title of the year at Aegon International against the British team of Fleming/Marray. After losing in the third round of Wimbledon, the pair reached the final of the International German Open losing to Poland's Mariusz Fyrstenberg and Marcin Matkowski. Soares and Peya won their first Masters title, both individually and as a team, at the Rogers Cup over British pair of Colin Fleming and Andy Murray. At the US Open, the pair reached their first Grand Slam final, however fell to established doubles partnership Leander Paes and Radek Štěpánek in straight sets. The Austrian-Brazilian team defended their title at the Valencia Open 500 defeating the world no. 1 Bryan/Bryan in three sets of tie-break and saving four match points in the match tie-break. They then reached the final of the BNP Paribas Masters once again facing the Bryan/Bryan, but this time lost in straight sets. Soares paired with Colin Fleming in February to win the Heineken Open, beating Brunström/Nielsen, and also reached the mixed doubles final of Wimbledon with Lisa Raymond, losing to Daniel Nestor and Kristina Mladenovic This is the first appearance at the event for both men.

Leander Paes & Radek Štěpánek did not play a lot of events as a team in 2013. They won their only title of the year at the US Open, ending the Bryan brothers' hope of winning a calendar year Grand Slam in the semifinals and defeating Peya/Soares in the final to capture their second Grand Slam as a team. They also reached the semifinals of Wimbledon. Paes teamed with Daniel Nestor to win the Winston-Salem Open, defeating Huey/Inglot. Štěpánek, on the other hand, reached the final of Citi Open with Mardy Fish, but lost to Benneteau/Zimonjić. It's the second year the pair have qualified together, Stepanek's second appearance, and Paes's 13th overall appearance.

On 21 October, debutants Ivan Dodig and Marcelo Melo and defending doubles champions Marcel Granollers and Marc López were announced as qualifiers.

Ivan Dodig & Marcelo Melo formed their partnership earlier in the year and had significant success. They won their biggest title of their careers at the Shanghai Rolex Masters, defeating the Spanish team of Marrero/Verdasco in three tie-breaks. They also reached their first Grand Slam final as a team and as individuals at Wimbledon, losing to the Bryans in four sets, after taking the first set. They followed that up with a semifinal showing at the US Open, losing to Peya/Soares in straight sets. Melo also won a title paired with Tommy Robredo at the Brisbane International, defeating Butorac/Hanley. Dodig reached the final of the PBZ Zagreb Indoors with Mate Pavić, but fell to Knowle/Polášek.

Marcel Granollers & Marc López continued their partnership from 2012 after winning the World Tour Finals. The pair began the year by reaching the semifinals of the Australian Open, but were defeated by surprise finalists Haase/Sijsling. The pair reached their first final of the season at the Western & Southern Open; however, they fell to the number 1 team of Bob and Mike Bryan in the final. This is the second straight year Granollers and Lopez have qualified for the year-end finals.

On 31 October, with the defeat of Mariusz Fyrstenberg and Marcin Matkowski, two of the three spots were filled by the teams of Aisam-ul-Haq Qureshi and Jean-Julien Rojer, and David Marrero and Fernando Verdasco

Aisam-ul-Haq Qureshi & Jean-Julien Rojer in the second year of their team-up enjoyed relative success. They won their biggest title as a team in Miami, defeating the Polish team of Fyrstenberg/Matkowski. They won their second title of the year at the If Stockholm Open over the Swedish pairing of Björkman/Lindstedt. They also reached two other finals, but lost, at the Open 13 to the Indian-British pair of Bopanna/Fleming and at the Portugal Open to González/Lipsky.

David Marrero & Fernando Verdasco made their doubles breakthrough in 2013, each reaching a career-high ranking this year. They reached their first doubles Masters final at the Shanghai Rolex Masters facing Dodig/Melo losing in three sets of tie-break, including a third set match tie-break. They won their lone title of the year at the St. Petersburg Open defeating the British-Uzbek team of Inglot/Istomin. Marrero also won two other titles with different partners at the Abierto Mexicano Telcel with Łukasz Kubot defeating Italians Bolelli/Fognini and at the ATP Vegeta Croatia Open Umag with Martin Kližan defeating Monroe/Stadler.

On 2 November, after the defeat of Max Mirnyi and Horia Tecău, the Polish team Mariusz Fyrstenberg and Marcin Matkowski took the final spot.

Mariusz Fyrstenberg & Marcin Matkowski continues there success as a team in 2013. They reach their first final of the year at the Sony Open Tennis losing to Qureshi/Rojer in straight sets. They won their lone title of the year at the International German Open defeating Peya/Soares in a match tie-break.

== Groupings ==
=== Singles ===
Group A is composed of French Open finalists Rafael Nadal and David Ferrer. They are joined by Czech Tomáš Berdych and debutant Stanislas Wawrinka. Against the rest of their group Nadal is 47–8, Ferrer is 19–27, Berdych is 11–30, and Wawrinka is 11–23.

Nadal leads every match–up he has on his group. He is 20–5 against his compatriot Ferrer, they met 5 times in 2013 with Nadal leading 4–1, however, Ferrer won their last meeting at the semifinals of the BNP Paribas Masters in straight sets. Nadal also leads Berdych 16–3, including the last 15 with four of them coming in 2013, their last match at the semifinals of China Open, where Nadal won when Berdych retired in the first set. Against Wawrinka, Nadal has a perfect 11–0 record, with the last win coming at the Shanghai Rolex Masters quarterfinals, 1 of 3 wins of Nadal in 2013. Against the remaining member of his Group, Ferrer has the advantage. Ferrer leads Berdych 7–3, including a win in their only match at quarterfinals of the BNP Paribas Masters. Against Swiss Wawrinka, Ferrer lead 7–4, splitting their two matches in 2013 both in the final, with Ferrer winning at the Copa Claro and Wawrinka winning at the Portugal Open. At the final match–up, Wawrinka lead Berdych 7–5, winning 2 of their 3 matches in 2013, including their last encounter at the Round of 16 at the US Open.

Group B is led by reigning Australian Open champion Novak Djokovic. He is joined by 2009 US Open winner Juan Martín del Potro, 17 time grand slam champion Roger Federer, and Richard Gasquet. Against the rest of the group Djokovic is 33–20, del Potro is 13–25, Federer is 40–21 and Gasquet is 4–22.

Despite not being the top ranked in his group, Federer leads every head–to–head in the group. Federer against group B leader Djokovic has a 16–14 record; however, Djokovic won their last meeting and lone meeting in 2013 at the BNP Paribas Masters semifinals, coming back from a set down. Against the Argentine del Potro, the Swiss is 14–5; however, del Potro has won three of the last four. The pair splits their matches in 2013, with del Potro winning in the final of the Swiss Indoors and Federer winning in the quarterfinals of BNP Paribas Masters. Federer also leads Frenchman Gasquet 10–2, their last meeting coming in the third round of the 2012 Mutua Madrid Open, with Federer winning in straight sets. World no. 2 Djokovic has the lead against the other two member of his group. The Serb is 10–3 against del Potro, leading their 2013 match–up 3–1, winning their most recent match at the Shanghai Rolex Masters final in a third-set tie–break. Djokovic has an almost perfect record against Gasquet at 9–1, including winning the last seven matches and 15 straight sets. Djokovic won their two meeting in 2013, including their last meeting at the semifinals of the China Open. In the final head–to–head in group B, del Potro leads Gasquet 5–1, winning the last five, the last meeting being at the 2012 Swiss Indoors Basel semifinals.

=== Doubles ===
Group A is led by the dominant team of the year, twins Bob Bryan and Mike Bryan. They are joined by the teams of Ivan Dodig and Marcelo Melo, Aisam-ul-Haq Qureshi and Jean-Julien Rojer, and Mariusz Fyrstenberg and Marcin Matkowski. Against their group Bryan/Bryan are 26–9, Dodig/Melo is 2–3, Qureshi/Rojer is 3–9, and Fyrstenberg/Matkowski is 9–18.

The Bryans lead every match–up in their group. They are 5–1 against Dodig/Melo, being 2–1 in the year, with the twins winning their last meeting at the semifinals of the BNP Paribas Masters. Against the team of Qureshi/Rojer they lead 7–1, having met once this year at the quarterfinals of the BNP Paribas Masters, with Bryan/Bryan winning. Finally, against the Polish duo of Fyrstenberg/Matkowski they lead 16–7, winning their only meeting in 2013 at the 2nd round of the BNP Paribas Masters. In the match–up between Dodig/Melo and Qureshi/Rojer, Dodig/Melo won their only meeting and that was at the Shanghai Rolex Masters in 2013. Against Fyrstenberg/Matkowski, Qureshi/Rojer has two wins each, meeting three times in 2013, with Qureshi/Rojer leading 2–1 and winning their last encounter at the second round of Shanghai Rolex Masters. On the final match–up, Fyrstenberg/Matkowski and Dodig/Melo have never met before.

Group B is composed of US Open finalists Alexander Peya and Bruno Soares, and champions Leander Paes and Radek Štěpánek. The group is completed by Spanish teams of Marcel Granollers and Marc López, and David Marrero and Fernando Verdasco. In their match–up against their group Peya/Soares 5–4, Granollers/López is 1–10, Marrero/Verdasco is 8–3, and Paes/Štěpánek is 4–1.

Peya/Soares has a decent record against each member of their group. Against Granollers/López they lead 2–1, winning their two meeting in 2013 with the last one at the semifinals of the Barcelona Open Banco Sabadell. In the other two match–ups, the Austrian–Brazilian pairing has an even record, having two wins a piece against Marrero/Verdasco and one win a piece against Paes/Štěpánek. Marrero/Verdasco leads 2–1 in their 2013 matches, including their last match at the second round of the Internazionali BNL d'Italia, while Paes/Štěpánek won their only meeting in 2013 against the Austrian–Brazilian duo in the final of the US Open. Granollers/López has never won a match against the other two teams. Marrero/Verdasco won all their six matches against their compatriots, including three this year, with the last one at the quarterfinals of the Shanghai Rolex Masters. Paes/Štěpánek on the other hand is 2–0 against Granollers/López, with their latest encounter being at last year's ATP World Tour Finals in the round robin. In the final head–to–head Paes/Štěpánek won their only match against Marrero/Verdasco at the quarterfinals of the BNP Paribas Open.

== Head-to-head ==
2013 ATP World Tour Finals – Singles

| | | Nadal | Djokovic | Ferrer | del Potro | Berdych | Federer | Wawrinka | Gasquet | Overall | YTD W–L |
| 1 | (Spain) Rafael Nadal | | 22–16 | 20–5 | 8–4 | 16–3 | 21–10 | 11–0 | 12–0 | 110–38 | 71–6 |
| 2 | (Serbia) Novak Djokovic | 16–22 | | 11–5 | 10–3 | 14–2 | 14–16 | 14–2 | 9–1 | 88–51 | 67–9 |
| 3 | (Spain) David Ferrer | 5–20 | 5–11 | | 6–3 | 7–3 | 0–14 | 7–4 | 8–3 | 38–58 | 60–21 |
| 4 | (Argentina) Juan Martín del Potro | 4–8 | 3–10 | 3–6 | | 4–2 | 5–14 | 3–2 | 5–1 | 27–43 | 50–14 |
| 5 | (Czech Republic) Tomáš Berdych | 3–16 | 2–14 | 3–7 | 2–4 | | 6–11 | 5–7 | 3–5 | 24–63 | 52–22 |
| 6 | (Switzerland) Roger Federer | 10–21 | 16–14 | 14–0 | 14–5 | 11–6 | | 13–1 | 10–2 | 88–49 | 43–15 |
| 7 | (Switzerland) Stanislas Wawrinka | 0–11 | 2–14 | 4–7 | 1–2 | 7–5 | 1–13 | | 1–1 | 16–53 | 49–21 |
| 8 | (France) Richard Gasquet | 0–12 | 1–9 | 3–8 | 1–5 | 5–3 | 2–10 | 1–1 | | 13–48 | 50–20 |

2013 ATP World Tour Finals – Doubles

| | | Bryan; Bryan | Peya; Soares | Dodig; Melo | Granollers; López | Qureshi; Rojer | Marrero; Verdasco | Paes; Štěpánek | Fyrstenberg; Matkowski | Overall | YTD W–L |
| 1 | (United States) Bob Bryan / (United States) Mike Bryan | | 5–1 | 3–1 | 5–1 | 7–1 | 3–0 | 4–4 | 16–7 | 43–15 | 67–11 |
| 2 | (Austria) Alexander Peya / (Brazil) Bruno Soares | 1–5 | | 3–0 | 2–1 | 0–0 | 2–2 | 1–1 | 3–1 | 12–10 | 53–18 |
| 3 | (Croatia) Ivan Dodig / (Brazil) Marcelo Melo | 1–3 | 0–3 | | 0–0 | 1–0 | 1–0 | 3–1 | 0–0 | 6–7 | 23–17 |
| 4 | (Spain) Marcel Granollers / (Spain) Marc López | 1–5 | 1–2 | 0–0 | | 2–1 | 0–6 | 0–2 | 1–3 | 5–19 | 30–21 |
| 5 | (Pakistan) Aisam-ul-Haq Qureshi / (Netherlands) Jean-Julien Rojer | 1–7 | 0–0 | 0–1 | 1–2 | | 0–1 | 0–2 | 2–2 | 4–15 | 29–25 |
| 6 | (Spain) David Marrero / (Spain) Fernando Verdasco | 0–3 | 2–2 | 0–1 | 6–0 | 1–0 | | 0–1 | 1–0 | 10–7 | 33–17 |
| 7 | (India) Leander Paes / (Czech Republic) Radek Štěpánek | 4–4 | 1–1 | 1–3 | 2–0 | 2–0 | 1–0 | | 0–0 | 11–8 | 13–5 |
| 8 | (Poland) Mariusz Fyrstenberg / (Poland) Marcin Matkowski | 7–16 | 1–3 | 0–0 | 3–1 | 2–2 | 0–1 | 0–0 | | 13–23 | 28–21 |

== Day-by-day summary ==
=== Round robin ===
==== Day 1 (4 November) ====
Matches on The O2 Arena
| Stage | Winner | Loser | Score |
|---|---|---|---|
| Doubles – Group A | (Poland) Mariusz Fyrstenberg (Poland) Marcin Matkowski [8] | (Pakistan) Aisam-ul-Haq Qureshi (Netherlands) Jean-Julien Rojer [5] | 6–3, 7–6^{(10–8)} |
| Singles – Group A | (Switzerland) Stanislas Wawrinka [7] | (Czech Republic) Tomáš Berdych [5] | 6–3, 6–7^{(0–7)}, 6–3 |
| Doubles – Group B | (Spain) David Marrero (Spain) Fernando Verdasco [6] | (Spain) Marcel Granollers (Spain) Marc López [4] | 6–1, 6–4 |
| Singles – Group B | (Argentina) Juan Martín del Potro [4] | (France) Richard Gasquet [8] | 6–7^{(4–7)}, 6–3, 7–5 |

==== Day 2 (5 November) ====
Matches on The O2 Arena
| Stage | Winner | Loser | Score |
|---|---|---|---|
| Doubles – Group B | (India) Leander Paes (Czech Republic) Radek Štěpánek [7] | (Austria) Alexander Peya (Brazil) Bruno Soares [2] | 6–3, 5–7, [10–8] |
| Singles – Group A | (Spain) Rafael Nadal [1] | (Spain) David Ferrer [3] | 6–3, 6–2 |
| Doubles – Group A | (Croatia) Ivan Dodig (Brazil) Marcelo Melo [3] | (United States) Bob Bryan (United States) Mike Bryan [1] | 6–3, 3–6, [10–8] |
| Singles – Group B | (Serbia) Novak Djokovic [2] | (Switzerland) Roger Federer [6] | 6–4, 6–7^{(2–7)}, 6–2 |

==== Day 3 (6 November) ====
Matches on The O2 Arena
| Stage | Winner | Loser | Score |
|---|---|---|---|
| Doubles – Group B | (Spain) David Marrero (Spain) Fernando Verdasco [6] | (India) Leander Paes (Czech Republic) Radek Štěpánek [7] | 6–4, 7–6^{(7–5)} |
| Singles – Group A | (Spain) Rafael Nadal [1] | (Switzerland) Stanislas Wawrinka [7] | 7–6^{(7–5)}, 7–6^{(8–6)} |
| Doubles – Group B | (Austria) Alexander Peya (Brazil) Bruno Soares [2] | (Spain) Marcel Granollers (Spain) Marc López [4] | 3–6, 6–4, [10–5] |
| Singles – Group A | (Czech Republic) Tomáš Berdych [5] | (Spain) David Ferrer [3] | 6–4, 6–4 |

==== Day 4 (7 November) ====
Matches on The O2 Arena
| Stage | Winner | Loser | Score |
|---|---|---|---|
| Doubles – Group A | (Croatia) Ivan Dodig (Brazil) Marcelo Melo [3] | (Poland) Mariusz Fyrstenberg (Poland) Marcin Matkowski [8] | 6–3, 3–6, [10–2] |
| Singles – Group B | (Switzerland) Roger Federer [6] | (France) Richard Gasquet [8] | 6–4, 6–3 |
| Doubles – Group A | (United States) Bob Bryan (United States) Mike Bryan [1] | (Pakistan) Aisam-ul-Haq Qureshi (Netherlands) Jean-Julien Rojer [5] | 7–6^{(7–3)}, 1–6, [14–12] |
| Singles – Group B | (Serbia) Novak Djokovic [2] | (Argentina) Juan Martín del Potro [4] | 6–3, 3–6, 6–3 |

==== Day 5 (8 November) ====
Matches on The O2 Arena
| Stage | Winner | Loser | Score |
|---|---|---|---|
| Doubles – Group B | (Spain) Marcel Granollers (Spain) Marc López [4] | (India) Leander Paes (Czech Republic) Radek Štěpánek [7] | 4–6, 7–6^{(7–5)}, [10–8] |
| Singles – Group A | (Switzerland) Stanislas Wawrinka [7] | (Spain) David Ferrer [3] | 6–7^{(3–7)}, 6–4, 6–1 |
| Doubles – Group B | (Austria) Alexander Peya (Brazil) Bruno Soares [2] | (Spain) David Marrero (Spain) Fernando Verdasco [6] | 6–3, 7–5 |
| Singles – Group A | (Spain) Rafael Nadal [1] | (Czech Republic) Tomáš Berdych [5] | 6–4, 1–6, 6–3 |

==== Day 6 (9 November) ====
Matches on The O2 Arena
| Stage | Winner | Loser | Score |
|---|---|---|---|
| Doubles – Group A | (Croatia) Ivan Dodig (Brazil) Marcelo Melo [3] | (Pakistan) Aisam-ul-Haq Qureshi (Netherlands) Jean-Julien Rojer [5] | 7–5, 3–6, [11–9] |
| Singles – Group B | (Switzerland) Roger Federer [6] | (Argentina) Juan Martín del Potro [4] | 4–6, 7–6^{(7–2)}, 7–5 |
| Doubles – Group A | (United States) Bob Bryan (United States) Mike Bryan [1] | (Poland) Mariusz Fyrstenberg (Poland) Marcin Matkowski [8] | 4–6, 6–3, [10–5] |
| Singles – Group B | (Serbia) Novak Djokovic [2] | (France) Richard Gasquet [8] | 7–6^{(7–5)}, 4–6, 6–3 |

=== Semifinals (10 November) ===
Matches on The O2 Arena
| Stage | Winner | Loser | Score |
|---|---|---|---|
| Doubles – Semifinals | (Spain) David Marrero (Spain) Fernando Verdasco [6] | (Croatia) Ivan Dodig (Brazil) Marcelo Melo [3] | 7–6^{(12–10)}, 7–5 |
| Singles – Semifinals | (Spain) Rafael Nadal [1] | (Switzerland) Roger Federer [6] | 7–5, 6–3 |
| Doubles – Semifinals | (United States) Bob Bryan (United States) Mike Bryan [1] | (Austria) Alexander Peya (Brazil) Bruno Soares [2] | 4–6, 6–4, [10–8] |
| Singles – Semifinals | (Serbia) Novak Djokovic [2] | (Switzerland) Stanislas Wawrinka [7] | 6–3, 6–3 |

=== Final (11 November) ===
Matches on The O2 Arena
| Stage | Winner | Loser | Score |
|---|---|---|---|
| Doubles – Final | (Spain) David Marrero (Spain) Fernando Verdasco [6] | (United States) Bob Bryan (United States) Mike Bryan [1] | 7–5, 6–7^{(3–7)}, [10–7] |
| Singles – Final | (Serbia) Novak Djokovic [2] | (Spain) Rafael Nadal [1] | 6–3, 6–4 |

== See also ==
- ATP rankings
- 2013 WTA Tour Championships
- 2013 ATP Challenger Tour Finals
