= 2013 ATP World Tour Finals – Doubles =

Doubles
- 2013 ATP World Tour Finals

Final
- Champions: (Spain) David Marrero (Spain) Fernando Verdasco
- Runners-up: (United States) Bob Bryan (United States) Mike Bryan
- Score: 7–5, 6–7^{(3–7)}, [10–7]

Events
Singles	Doubles
← 2012 ·	ATP World Tour Finals	· 2014 →

David Marrero and Fernando Verdasco defeated Bob and Mike Bryan in the final, 7–5, 6–7^{(3–7)}, [10–7] to win the doubles tennis title at the 2013 ATP World Tour Finals.

Marcel Granollers and Marc López were the defending champions, but they were eliminated in the round-robin stage.

== Seeds ==
1. (United States) Bob Bryan / (United States) Mike Bryan (final)
2. (Austria) Alexander Peya / (Brazil) Bruno Soares (semifinals)
3. (Croatia) Ivan Dodig / (Brazil) Marcelo Melo (semifinals)
4. (Spain) Marcel Granollers / (Spain) Marc López (round robin)
5. (Pakistan) Aisam-ul-Haq Qureshi / (Netherlands) Jean-Julien Rojer (round robin)
6. (Spain) David Marrero / (Spain) Fernando Verdasco (champions)
7. (India) Leander Paes / (Czech Republic) Radek Štěpánek (round robin)
8. (Poland) Mariusz Fyrstenberg / (Poland) Marcin Matkowski (round robin)

== Draw ==
=== Key ===
- Q = Qualifier
- WC = Wild card
- LL = Lucky loser
- Alt = Alternate
- SE = Special exempt
- PR = Protected ranking
- ITF = ITF entry
- JE = Junior exempt
- w/o = Walkover
- r = Retired
- d = Defaulted
- SR = Special ranking

=== Finals ===
Semifinals
3	(Croatia) Ivan Dodig (Brazil) Marcelo Melo	6^{10}	5
6	(Spain) David Marrero (Spain) Fernando Verdasco	7^{12}	7
2	(Austria) Alexander Peya (Brazil) Bruno Soares	6	4	[8]
1	(United States) Bob Bryan (United States) Mike Bryan	4	6	[10]

Final
6	(Spain) David Marrero (Spain) Fernando Verdasco	7	6^{3}	[10]
1	(United States) Bob Bryan (United States) Mike Bryan	5	7^{7}	[7]

=== Group A ===
		(United States) Bryan (United States) Bryan	(Croatia) Dodig (Brazil) Melo	(Pakistan) Qureshi (Netherlands) Rojer	(Poland) Fyrstenberg (Poland) Matkowski	RR W–L	Set W–L	Game W–L	Standings
1	(United States) Bob Bryan (United States) Mike Bryan		6–3, 3–6, [8–10]	7–6^{(7–3)}, 1–6, [14–12]	4–6, 6–3, [10–5]	2–1	5–4 (55.6%)	29–31 (48.3%)	2
3	(Croatia) Ivan Dodig (Brazil) Marcelo Melo	3–6, 6–3, [10–8]		7–5, 3–6, [11–9]	6–3, 3–6, [10–2]	3–0	6–3 (66.7%)	31–29 (51.7%)	1
5	(Pakistan) Aisam-ul-Haq Qureshi (Netherlands) Jean-Julien Rojer	6–7^{(3–7)}, 6–1, [12–14]	5–7, 6–3, [9–11]		3–6, 6–7^{(8–10)}	0–3	2–6 (25.0%)	32–33 (49.2%)	4
8	(Poland) Mariusz Fyrstenberg (Poland) Marcin Matkowski	6–4, 3–6, [5–10]	3–6, 6–3, [2–10]	6–3, 7–6^{(10–8)}		1–2	4–4 (50.0%)	31–30 (50.8%)	3

Standings are determined by: 1. number of wins; 2. number of matches; 3. in two-players-ties, head-to-head records; 4. in three-players-ties, percentage of sets won, or of games won; 5. steering-committee decision.

=== Group B ===
		(Austria) Peya (Brazil) Soares	(Spain) Granollers (Spain) López	(Spain) Marrero (Spain) Verdasco	(India) Paes (Czech Republic) Štěpánek	RR W–L	Set W–L	Game W–L	Standings
2	(Austria) Alexander Peya (Brazil) Bruno Soares		3–6, 6–4, [10–5]	6–3, 7–5	3–6, 7–5, [8–10]	2–1	5–3 (62.5%)	33–30 (52.4%)	1
4	(Spain) Marcel Granollers (Spain) Marc López	6–3, 4–6, [5–10]		1–6, 4–6	4–6, 7–6^{(7–5)}, [10–8]	1–2	3–5 (37.5%)	27–34 (44.3%)	3
6	(Spain) David Marrero (Spain) Fernando Verdasco	3–6, 5–7	6–1, 6–4		6–4, 7–6^{(7–5)}	2–1	4–2 (66.7%)	33–28 (54.1%)	2
7	(India) Leander Paes (Czech Republic) Radek Štěpánek	6–3, 5–7, [10–8]	6–4, 6–7^{(5–7)}, [8–10]	4–6, 6–7^{(5–7)}		1–2	3–5 (37.5%)	34–35 (49.3%)	4

Standings are determined by: 1. number of wins; 2. number of matches; 3. in two-players-ties, head-to-head records; 4. in three-players-ties, percentage of sets won, or of games won; 5. steering-committee decision.
