= 2013 Mutua Madrid Open – Men's doubles =

Men's doubles
- 2013 Mutua Madrid Open

Final
- Champions: (United States) Bob Bryan (United States) Mike Bryan
- Runners-up: (Austria) Alexander Peya (Brazil) Bruno Soares
- Score: 6–2, 6–3

Events
Singles	men	women
Doubles	men	women
← 2012 ·	Mutua Madrid Open	· 2014 →

Mariusz Fyrstenberg and Marcin Matkowski were the defending champions but lost in the second round to Alexander Peya and Bruno Soares.
Bob and Mike Bryan won the title, defeating Peya and Soares in the final, 6–2, 6–3.

== Seeds ==
All seeds receive a bye into the second round.

1. (United States) Bob Bryan / (United States) Mike Bryan (champions)
2. (Spain) Marcel Granollers / (Spain) Marc López (second round)
3. (Sweden) Robert Lindstedt / (Canada) Daniel Nestor (quarterfinals)
4. (Pakistan) Aisam-ul-Haq Qureshi / (Netherlands) Jean-Julien Rojer (second round)
5. (Belarus) Max Mirnyi / (Romania) Horia Tecău (quarterfinals)
6. (India) Mahesh Bhupathi / (India) Rohan Bopanna (quarterfinals)
7. (Austria) Alexander Peya / (Brazil) Bruno Soares (final)
8. (Austria) Jürgen Melzer / (India) Leander Paes (second round)

== Draw ==
=== Key ===
- Q = Qualifier
- WC = Wild card
- LL = Lucky loser
- Alt = Alternate
- SE = Special exempt
- PR = Protected ranking
- ITF = ITF entry
- JE = Junior exempt
- w/o = Walkover
- r = Retired
- d = Defaulted
- SR = Special ranking

=== Finals ===
Semifinals
1	(United States) Bob Bryan (United States) Mike Bryan	6	6^{1}	[10]
(France) Jérémy Chardy (Poland) Łukasz Kubot	3	7^{7}	[4]
7	(Austria) Alexander Peya (Brazil) Bruno Soares	7	7
(Spain) David Marrero (Spain) Fernando Verdasco	5	5

Final
1	(United States) Bob Bryan (United States) Mike Bryan	6	6
7	(Austria) Alexander Peya (Brazil) Bruno Soares	2	3

=== Top half ===
First round
(United States) J Isner (United States) S Querrey	6	6
(France) J Benneteau (Serbia) N Zimonjić	2	4
(Bulgaria) G Dimitrov (Canada) M Raonic	4	4
(Germany) T Haas (Czech Republic) R Štěpánek	6	6
(Brazil) M Melo (Russia) M Youzhny	6^{6}	4
(France) J Chardy (Poland) Ł Kubot	7^{8}	6
(France) M Llodra (France) G Simon	2	6	[9]
Alt	(Argentina) J Mónaco (Argentina) H Zeballos	6	2	[11]

Second round
1	(United States) B Bryan (United States) M Bryan	7^{8}	7
(United States) J Isner (United States) S Querrey	6^{6}	5
(Germany) T Haas (Czech Republic) R Štěpánek	7	6
8	(Austria) J Melzer (India) L Paes	5	1
4	(Pakistan) A-u-H Qureshi (Netherlands) J-J Rojer	2	6^{4}
(France) J Chardy (Poland) Ł Kubot	6	7^{7}
Alt	(Argentina) J Mónaco (Argentina) H Zeballos	3	6	[5]
6	(India) M Bhupathi (India) R Bopanna	6	3	[10]

Quarterfinals
1	(United States) B Bryan (United States) M Bryan	7^{7}	6
(Germany) T Haas (Czech Republic) R Štěpánek	6^{2}	3
(France) J Chardy (Poland) Ł Kubot	6	6
6	(India) M Bhupathi (India) R Bopanna	2	4

Semifinals
1	(United States) B Bryan (United States) M Bryan	6	6^{1}	[10]
(France) J Chardy (Poland) Ł Kubot	3	7^{7}	[4]

=== Bottom half ===
First round
(Poland) M Fyrstenberg (Poland) M Matkowski	4
WC	(Spain) N Almagro (Austria) O Marach	1^{r}
WC	(Spain) D Gimeno Traver (Spain) D Muñoz de la Nava	1	6	[4]
(Croatia) M Čilić (Czech Republic) L Dlouhý	6	4	[10]
(Italy) D Bracciali (Italy) F Fognini	3	6^{5}
(Austria) J Knowle (Slovakia) F Polášek	6	7^{7}
(Germany) F Mayer (Italy) A Seppi	1	4
(Spain) D Marrero (Spain) F Verdasco	6	6

Second round
7	(Austria) A Peya (Brazil) B Soares	6	6
(Poland) M Fyrstenberg (Poland) M Matkowski	4	0
(Croatia) M Čilić (Czech Republic) L Dlouhý	6^{3}	6^{3}
3	(Sweden) R Lindstedt (Canada) D Nestor	7^{7}	7^{7}
5	(Belarus) M Mirnyi (Romania) H Tecău	3	6	[11]
(Austria) J Knowle (Slovakia) F Polášek	6	4	[9]
(Spain) D Marrero (Spain) F Verdasco	7^{7}	6
2	(Spain) M Granollers (Spain) M López	6^{4}	3

Quarterfinals
7	(Austria) A Peya (Brazil) B Soares	6	6
3	(Sweden) R Lindstedt (Canada) D Nestor	4	2
5	(Belarus) M Mirnyi (Romania) H Tecău	2	6^{3}
(Spain) D Marrero (Spain) F Verdasco	6	7^{7}

Semifinals
7	(Austria) A Peya (Brazil) B Soares	7	7
(Spain) D Marrero (Spain) F Verdasco	5	5
