= 2013 Mutua Madrid Open – Women's doubles =

Tennis tournament

Women's doubles
- 2013 Mutua Madrid Open

Final
- Champions: (Russia) Anastasia Pavlyuchenkova (Czech Republic) Lucie Šafářová
- Runners-up: (Zimbabwe) Cara Black (New Zealand) Marina Erakovic
- Score: 6–2, 6–4

Events
Singles	men	women
Doubles	men	women
← 2012 ·	Mutua Madrid Open	· 2014 →

Sara Errani and Roberta Vinci were the defending champions, but chose not to participate in doubles.
Anastasia Pavlyuchenkova and Lucie Šafářová won the title, defeating Cara Black and Marina Erakovic in the final, 6–2, 6–4.

== Seeds ==
The top four seeds receive a bye into the second round.

1. (Czech Republic) Andrea Hlaváčková / (Czech Republic) Lucie Hradecká (second round)
2. (Russia) Nadia Petrova / (Slovenia) Katarina Srebotnik (second round)
3. (Russia) Ekaterina Makarova / (Russia) Elena Vesnina (quarterfinals)
4. (United States) Raquel Kops-Jones / (United States) Abigail Spears (quarterfinals)
5. (United States) Bethanie Mattek-Sands / (India) Sania Mirza (second round)
6. (Germany) Anna-Lena Grönefeld / (Czech Republic) Květa Peschke (first round)
7. (China) Zhang Shuai / (China) Zheng Jie (first round)
8. (Chinese Taipei) Hsieh Su-wei / (China) Peng Shuai (first round)

== Draw ==
=== Key ===
- Q = Qualifier
- WC = Wild card
- LL = Lucky loser
- Alt = Alternate
- SE = Special exempt
- PR = Protected ranking
- ITF = ITF entry
- JE = Junior exempt
- w/o = Walkover
- r = Retired
- d = Defaulted
- SR = Special ranking

=== Finals ===
Semifinals
(Zimbabwe) Cara Black (New Zealand) Marina Erakovic	6	6
WC	(Spain) Sílvia Soler Espinosa (Spain) Carla Suárez Navarro	1	3
(France) Kristina Mladenovic (Kazakhstan) Galina Voskoboeva	7^{7}	0	[7]
(Russia) Anastasia Pavlyuchenkova (Czech Republic) Lucie Šafářová	6^{5}	6	[10]

Final
(Zimbabwe) Cara Black (New Zealand) Marina Erakovic	2	4
(Russia) Anastasia Pavlyuchenkova (Czech Republic) Lucie Šafářová	6	6

=== Top half ===
First round
(Slovakia) D Cibulková (United States) L Huber	3	7	[6]
(Russia) S Kuznetsova (Italy) F Pennetta	6	5	[10]
WC	(France) A Cornet (Italy) F Schiavone	6^{3}	1
(Zimbabwe) C Black (New Zealand) M Erakovic	7^{7}	6
WC	(Serbia) J Janković (Croatia) M Lučić-Baroni	7^{7}	7^{7}
6	(Germany) A-L Grönefeld (Czech Republic) K Peschke	6^{5}	6^{1}
(Croatia) D Jurak (Hungary) K Marosi	4	3
(United States) V Lepchenko (Australia) A Rodionova	6	6
(Latvia) L Dekmeijere (Georgia (country)) O Kalashnikova	7	6
(Germany) J Görges (Kazakhstan) Y Shvedova	5	3
WC	(Spain) S Soler Espinosa (Spain) C Suárez Navarro	7^{8}	4	[10]
8	(Chinese Taipei) S-w Hsieh (China) S Peng	6^{6}	6	[8]

Second round
1	(Czech Republic) A Hlaváčková (Czech Republic) L Hradecká	2	4
(Russia) S Kuznetsova (Italy) F Pennetta	6	6
(Zimbabwe) C Black (New Zealand) M Erakovic	6	6
WC	(Serbia) J Janković (Croatia) M Lučić-Baroni	3	0
4	(United States) R Kops-Jones (United States) A Spears	7^{7}	7^{8}
(United States) V Lepchenko (Australia) A Rodionova	6^{2}	6^{6}
(Latvia) L Dekmeijere (Georgia (country)) O Kalashnikova	6^{2}	4
WC	(Spain) S Soler Espinosa (Spain) C Suárez Navarro	7^{7}	6

Quarterfinals
(Russia) S Kuznetsova (Italy) F Pennetta	6	1	[5]
(Zimbabwe) C Black (New Zealand) M Erakovic	4	6	[10]
4	(United States) R Kops-Jones (United States) A Spears	6	2	[4]
WC	(Spain) S Soler Espinosa (Spain) C Suárez Navarro	4	6	[10]

Semifinals
(Zimbabwe) C Black (New Zealand) M Erakovic	6	6
WC	(Spain) S Soler Espinosa (Spain) C Suárez Navarro	1	3

=== Bottom half ===
First round
7	(China) S Zhang (China) J Zheng	4	1
(France) K Mladenovic (Kazakhstan) G Voskoboeva	6	6
(South Africa) N Grandin (Czech Republic) V Uhlířová	6	7^{8}
(United States) M Moulton-Levy (Poland) A Rosolska	3	6^{6}
(Chinese Taipei) H-c Chan (Belarus) O Govortsova	6^{2}	7	[10]
Alt	(Sweden) S Arvidsson (Sweden) J Larsson	7^{7}	5	[8]
5	(United States) B Mattek-Sands (India) S Mirza	7^{7}	4	[10]
(Slovakia) D Hantuchová (Spain) A Medina Garrigues	6^{3}	6	[4]
(Russia) A Pavlyuchenkova (Czech Republic) L Šafářová	6	6
WC	(Spain) G Muguruza (Spain) MT Torró Flor	4	2
(United States) L Raymond (United Kingdom) L Robson	5	1
(Slovakia) J Husárová (Germany) S Lisicki	7	6

Second round
(France) K Mladenovic (Kazakhstan) G Voskoboeva	2	6	[10]
(South Africa) N Grandin (Czech Republic) V Uhlířová	6	4	[8]
(Chinese Taipei) H-c Chan (Belarus) O Govortsova	3	3
3	(Russia) E Makarova (Russia) E Vesnina	6	6
5	(United States) B Mattek-Sands (India) S Mirza	5	1
(Russia) A Pavlyuchenkova (Czech Republic) L Šafářová	7	6
(Slovakia) J Husárová (Germany) S Lisicki	7	5	[10]
2	(Russia) N Petrova (Slovenia) K Srebotnik	5	7	[6]

Quarterfinals
(France) K Mladenovic (Kazakhstan) G Voskoboeva	6	6
3	(Russia) E Makarova (Russia) E Vesnina	4	2
(Russia) A Pavlyuchenkova (Czech Republic) L Šafářová	6	3	[10]
(Slovakia) J Husárová (Germany) S Lisicki	2	6	[7]

Semifinals
(France) K Mladenovic (Kazakhstan) G Voskoboeva	7^{7}	0	[7]
(Russia) A Pavlyuchenkova (Czech Republic) L Šafářová	6^{5}	6	[10]
