= 2013 ATP World Tour Finals – Singles =

Singles
- 2013 ATP World Tour Finals

Final
- Champion: (Serbia) Novak Djokovic
- Runner-up: (Spain) Rafael Nadal
- Score: 6–3, 6–4

Events
Singles	Doubles
- ATP World Tour Finals

Defending champion Novak Djokovic defeated Rafael Nadal in the final, 6–3, 6–4 to win the singles tennis title at the 2013 ATP World Tour Finals. It was his third Tour Finals title.

Nadal was attempting to complete the career Super Slam. This was his last final at the event.

Stanislas Wawrinka made his debut at the event.

== Seeds ==
1. (Spain) Rafael Nadal (final)
2. (Serbia) Novak Djokovic (champion)
3. (Spain) David Ferrer (round robin)
4. (Argentina) Juan Martín del Potro (round robin)
5. (Czech Republic) Tomáš Berdych (round robin)
6. (Switzerland) Roger Federer (semifinals)
7. (Switzerland) Stanislas Wawrinka (semifinals)
8. (France) Richard Gasquet (round robin)

== Alternates ==
1. (France) Jo-Wilfried Tsonga (Did not play)
2. (Canada) Milos Raonic (Did not play)

== Draw ==
Key

- Q = Qualifier
- WC = Wild card
- LL = Lucky loser
- Alt = Alternate
- ITF = ITF entry
- PR = Protected ranking
- SR = Special ranking
- SE = Special exempt
- JE = Junior exempt
- JR = Junior Accelerator Programme entrant
- CO = College Accelerator Programme entrant
- NG = Next Gen Accelerator Program entrant
- w/o = Walkover
- r = Retired
- d = Defaulted

=== Finals ===
Semifinals
1	(Spain) Rafael Nadal	7	6
6	(Switzerland) Roger Federer	5	3
2	(Serbia) Novak Djokovic	6	6
7	(Switzerland) Stanislas Wawrinka	3	3

Final
1	(Spain) Rafael Nadal	3	4
2	(Serbia) Novak Djokovic	6	6

=== Group A ===
		(Spain) Nadal	(Spain) Ferrer	(Czech Republic) Berdych	(Switzerland) Wawrinka	RR W–L	Set W–L	Game W–L	Standings
1	(Spain) Rafael Nadal		6–3, 6–2	6–4, 1–6, 6–3	7–6^{(7–5)}, 7–6^{(8–6)}	3–0	6–1 (85.7%)	39–30 (56.5%)	1
3	(Spain) David Ferrer	3–6, 2–6		4–6, 4–6	7–6^{(7–3)}, 4–6, 1–6	0–3	1–6 (14.2%)	25–42 (37.3%)	4
5	(Czech Republic) Tomáš Berdych	4–6, 6–1, 3–6	6–4, 6–4		3–6, 7–6^{(7–0)}, 3–6	1–2	4–4 (50.0%)	38–39 (49.4%)	3
7	(Switzerland) Stanislas Wawrinka	6–7^{(5–7)}, 6–7^{(6–8)}	6–7^{(3–7)}, 6–4, 6–1	6–3, 6–7^{(0–7)}, 6–3		2–1	4–4 (50.0%)	48–39 (55.2%)	2

Standings are determined by: 1. number of wins; 2. number of matches; 3. in two-players-ties, head-to-head records; 4. in three-players-ties, percentage of sets won, or of games won initially to sort out a superior/inferior player, then head-to-head records; 5. ATP rankings

=== Group B ===
		(Serbia) Djokovic	(Argentina) Del Potro	(Switzerland) Federer	(France) Gasquet	RR W–L	Set W–L	Game W–L	Standings
2	(Serbia) Novak Djokovic		6–3, 3–6, 6–3	6–4, 6–7^{(2–7)}, 6–2	7–6^{(7–5)}, 4–6, 6–3	3–0	6–3 (66.7%)	50–40 (55.6%)	1
4	(Argentina) Juan Martín del Potro	3–6, 6–3, 3–6		6–4, 6–7^{(2–7)}, 5–7	6–7^{(4–7)}, 6–3, 7–5	1–2	4–5 (44.4%)	48–48 (50.0%)	3
6	(Switzerland) Roger Federer	4–6, 7–6^{(7–2)}, 2–6	4–6, 7–6^{(7–2)}, 7–5		6–4, 6–3	2–1	5–3 (62.5%)	43–42 (50.6%)	2
8	(France) Richard Gasquet	6–7^{(5–7)}, 6–4, 3–6	7–6^{(7–4)}, 3–6, 5–7	4–6, 3–6		0–3	2–6 (25.0%)	37–48 (43.5%)	4

Standings are determined by: 1. number of wins; 2. number of matches; 3. in two-players-ties, head-to-head records; 4. in three-players-ties, percentage of sets won, or of games won initially to sort out a superior/inferior player, then head-to-head records; 5. ATP rankings
