= 2013 Barcelona Open Banco Sabadell =

- Date: 20–28 April
- Edition: 61st
- Category: ATP World Tour 500
- Draw: 48S / 16D
- Prize money: €2,166,875
- Surface: Clay
- Location: Barcelona, Spain
- Venue: Real Club de Tenis Barcelona

Champions

Singles
- (Spain) Rafael Nadal

Doubles
- (Austria) Alexander Peya / (Brazil) Bruno Soares
← 2012 ·	Barcelona Open Banco Sabadell	· 2014 →

The 2013 Barcelona Open Banco Sabadell (also known as the Torneo Godó) was a men's tennis tournament played on outdoor clay courts. It was the 61st edition of the event and it was part of the ATP World Tour 500 series of the 2013 ATP World Tour. It took place at the Real Club de Tenis Barcelona in Barcelona, Catalonia, Spain, from 20 April through 28 April 2013. Second-seeded Rafael Nadal won his record eighth title at the tournament.

== Points and prize money ==
=== Points distribution ===
Event	W	F	SF	QF	Round of 16	Round of 32	Round of 64	Q	Q2	Q1
Singles	500	300	180	90	45	20	0	10	4	0
Doubles	500	300	180	90	0	—	—	—	—	—

=== Prize money ===
Event	W	F	SF	QF	Round of 16	Round of 32	Round of 64	Q2	Q1
Singles	€389,300	€177,500	€82,700	€39,460	€19,200	€10,230	€5,955	€1,100	€570
Doubles	€121,460	€54,810	€25,850	€12,500	€6,390	—	—	—	—

== Singles main draw entrants ==
=== Seeds ===
Country	Player	Rank^{1}	Seed
ESP	David Ferrer	4	1
ESP	Rafael Nadal	5	2
CZE	Tomáš Berdych	6	3
ESP	Nicolás Almagro	12	4
CAN	Milos Raonic	15	5
JPN	Kei Nishikori	16	6
ARG	Juan Mónaco	20	7
GER	Philipp Kohlschreiber	21	8
POL	Jerzy Janowicz	24	9
FRA	Jérémy Chardy	25	10
SVK	Martin Kližan	28	11
ESP	Fernando Verdasco	31	12
FRA	Benoît Paire	33	13
BUL	Grigor Dimitrov	34	14
ESP	Marcel Granollers	35	15
BRA	Thomaz Bellucci	39	16

- ^{1} Rankings as of 15 April 2013.

=== Other entrants ===
The following players received wildcards into the main draw:

- (Spain) Roberto Carballés Baena
- (Spain) Pablo Carreño Busta
- (Spain) Gerard Granollers
- (Spain) Albert Montañés

The following players received entry from the qualifying draw:

- (France) Kenny de Schepper
- (Latvia) Ernests Gulbis
- (Czech Republic) Jan Hájek
- (Spain) Marc López
- (Spain) Guillermo Olaso
- (Russia) Dmitry Tursunov

The following player received entry as a lucky loser:

- (Germany) Jan-Lennard Struff

=== Withdrawals ===
Before the tournament

- (Spain) Roberto Bautista Agut
- (France) Richard Gasquet
- (Spain) Feliciano López
- (Argentina) Leonardo Mayer

During the tournament

- (Brazil) Thomaz Bellucci (abdominal injury)

== Doubles main draw entrants ==
=== Seeds ===
Country	Player	Country	Player	Rank^{1}	Seed
~~USA~~	~~Bob Bryan~~	~~USA~~	~~Mike Bryan~~	~~2~~	~~1~~
ESP	Marcel Granollers	ESP	Marc López	7	2
SWE	Robert Lindstedt	CAN	Daniel Nestor	11	3
PAK	Aisam-ul-Haq Qureshi	NED	Jean-Julien Rojer	17	4

- Rankings are as of 15 April 2013.

=== Other entrants ===
The following pairs received wildcards into the doubles main draw:

- (Spain) Gerard Granollers / (Spain) Albert Montañés
- (Spain) Albert Ramos / (Spain) Tommy Robredo

The following pair received entry as alternates:

- (Russia) Nikolay Davydenko / (Uzbekistan) Denis Istomin

=== Withdrawals ===
- (United States) Mike Bryan (wrist injury)

== Finals ==
=== Singles ===
- (Spain) Rafael Nadal defeated (Spain) Nicolás Almagro 6–4, 6–3

=== Doubles ===
- (Austria) Alexander Peya/ (Brazil) Bruno Soares defeated (Sweden) Robert Lindstedt / (Canada) Daniel Nestor 5–7, 7–6^{(9–7)}, [10–4]
