= 2013 Mutua Madrid Open – Men's singles =

Men's singles
- 2013 Mutua Madrid Open

Final
- Champion: (Spain) Rafael Nadal
- Runner-up: (Switzerland) Stan Wawrinka
- Score: 6–2, 6–4

Events
Singles	men	women
Doubles	men	women
- Mutua Madrid Open

Rafael Nadal defeated Stan Wawrinka in the final, 6–2, 6–4 to win the men's singles tennis title at the 2013 Madrid Open.

Roger Federer was the defending champion, but lost to Kei Nishikori in the third round. This edition of the Madrid Open was the first since 2001 (when the tournament was held in Stuttgart) not to feature either of the top two seeds in the quarterfinals, as world No. 1 Novak Djokovic was defeated in the second round by Grigor Dimitrov.

== Seeds ==
The top eight seeds receive a bye into the second round.

1. (Serbia) Novak Djokovic (second round)
2. (Switzerland) Roger Federer (third round)
3. (United Kingdom) Andy Murray (quarterfinals)
4. (Spain) David Ferrer (quarterfinals)
5. (Spain) Rafael Nadal (champion)
6. (Czech Republic) Tomáš Berdych (semifinals)
7. (France) Jo-Wilfried Tsonga (quarterfinals)
8. (France) Richard Gasquet (second round)
9. (Serbia) Janko Tipsarević (first round)
10. (Croatia) Marin Čilić (first round)
11. (Spain) Nicolás Almagro (second round)
12. (Canada) Milos Raonic (second round)
13. (Germany) Tommy Haas (third round)
14. (Japan) Kei Nishikori (quarterfinals)
15. (Switzerland) Stan Wawrinka (final)
16. (France) Gilles Simon (third round)

== Draw ==
Key

- Q = Qualifier
- WC = Wild card
- LL = Lucky loser
- Alt = Alternate
- ITF = ITF entry
- PR = Protected ranking
- SR = Special ranking
- SE = Special exempt
- JE = Junior exempt
- JR = Junior Accelerator Programme entrant
- CO = College Accelerator Programme entrant
- NG = Next Gen Accelerator Program entrant
- w/o = Walkover
- r = Retired
- d = Defaulted

=== Finals ===
Quarterfinals
15	(Switzerland) Stan Wawrinka	6	6^{9}	6
7	(France) Jo-Wilfried Tsonga	2	7^{11}	4
3	(United Kingdom) Andy Murray	6^{3}	4
6	(Czech Republic) Tomáš Berdych	7^{7}	6
5	(Spain) Rafael Nadal	4	7^{7}	6
4	(Spain) David Ferrer	6	6^{3}	0
WC	(Spain) Pablo Andújar	6	7
14	(Japan) Kei Nishikori	3	5

Semifinals
15	(Switzerland) Stan Wawrinka	6	4	6
6	(Czech Republic) Tomáš Berdych	3	6	4
5	(Spain) Rafael Nadal	6	6
WC	(Spain) Pablo Andújar	0	4

Final
15	(Switzerland) Stan Wawrinka	2	4
5	(Spain) Rafael Nadal	6	6

=== Top half ===
==== Section 1 ====
First round
(Bulgaria) G Dimitrov	6	6
WC	(Spain) J Martí	2	4
Q	(Colombia) S Giraldo	6	6
(Slovakia) M Kližan	2	4
WC	(Romania) M Copil	4	4
15	(Switzerland) S Wawrinka	6	6
12	(Canada) M Raonic	7	7^{7}
(Russia) N Davydenko	5	6^{5}
(Belgium) D Goffin	6^{2}	2
(Spain) F Verdasco	7^{7}	6
Q	(Netherlands) R Haase	6	6^{6}	6
(Ukraine) A Dolgopolov	3	7^{8}	2

Second round
1	(Serbia) N Djokovic	6^{6}	7^{10}	3
(Bulgaria) G Dimitrov	7^{8}	6^{8}	6
Q	(Colombia) S Giraldo	3	3
15	(Switzerland) S Wawrinka	6	6
12	(Canada) M Raonic	4	6	6^{7}
(Spain) F Verdasco	6	2	7^{9}
Q	(Netherlands) R Haase	6^{5}	6^{2}
7	(France) J-W Tsonga	7^{7}	7^{7}

Third round
(Bulgaria) G Dimitrov	6	4	1
15	(Switzerland) S Wawrinka	3	6	6
(Spain) F Verdasco	6	3	2
7	(France) J-W Tsonga	4	6	6

Quarterfinals
15	(Switzerland) S Wawrinka	6	6^{9}	6
7	(France) J-W Tsonga	2	7^{11}	4

==== Section 2 ====
First round
LL	(Australia) M Matosevic	2	7^{7}	4
(Germany) F Mayer	6	6^{5}	6
(France) J Chardy	6	7^{7}
(Argentina) H Zeballos	4	6^{3}
(France) J Benneteau	6	5	3
16	(France) G Simon	2	7	6
9	(Serbia) J Tipsarević	6^{5}	3
(Argentina) J Mónaco	7^{7}	6
(South Africa) K Anderson	6	6
Q	(Canada) J Levine	2	2
(Poland) J Janowicz	6	6
(United States) S Querrey	3	4

Second round
3	(United Kingdom) A Murray	7^{13}	7^{7}
(Germany) F Mayer	6^{11}	6^{3}
(France) J Chardy	4	6^{5}
16	(France) G Simon	6	7^{7}
(Argentina) J Mónaco	6^{5}	6	4
(South Africa) K Anderson	7^{7}	3	6
(Poland) J Janowicz	7^{7}	3	2
6	(Czech Republic) T Berdych	6^{3}	6	6

Third round
3	(United Kingdom) A Murray	2	6	7^{8}
16	(France) G Simon	6	4	6^{6}
(South Africa) K Anderson	6^{5}	5
6	(Czech Republic) T Berdych	7^{7}	7

Quarterfinals
3	(United Kingdom) A Murray	6^{3}	4
6	(Czech Republic) T Berdych	7^{7}	6

=== Bottom half ===
==== Section 3 ====
First round
Q	(Brazil) J Souza	1	6^{0}
(France) B Paire	6	7^{7}
(Italy) F Fognini	6^{4}	6	6^{5}
(Russia) M Youzhny	7^{7}	2	7^{7}
Q	(Germany) T Kamke	4	0^{r}
11	(Spain) N Almagro	6	0
13	(Germany) T Haas	6	6
(Italy) A Seppi	1	2
(Cyprus) M Baghdatis	4	2
WC	(Spain) T Robredo	6	6
Q	(Belgium) X Malisse	3	2
(Uzbekistan) D Istomin	6	6

Second round
5	(Spain) R Nadal	6	6
(France) B Paire	3	4
(Russia) M Youzhny	7^{7}	4	6
11	(Spain) N Almagro	6^{4}	6	2
13	(Germany) T Haas	6	7
WC	(Spain) T Robredo	3	5
(Uzbekistan) D Istomin	5	2
4	(Spain) D Ferrer	7	6

Third round
5	(Spain) R Nadal	6	6
(Russia) M Youzhny	2	3
13	(Germany) T Haas	5	6	4
4	(Spain) D Ferrer	7	4	6

Quarterfinals
5	(Spain) R Nadal	4	7^{7}	6
4	(Spain) D Ferrer	6	6^{3}	0

==== Section 4 ====
First round
(Spain) F López	6	4	2
(Spain) D Gimeno Traver	2	6	6
(United States) J Isner	7	7^{10}
Q	(Spain) G García López	5	6^{8}
WC	(Spain) P Andújar	6^{6}	6	6
10	(Croatia) M Čilić	7^{8}	4	1
14	(Japan) K Nishikori	6	6
(Austria) J Melzer	3	2
(Serbia) V Troicki	7	4	6
(Spain) M Granollers	5	6	2
(Australia) B Tomic	3	2
(Czech Republic) R Štěpánek	6	6

Second round
8	(France) R Gasquet	5	6	4
(Spain) D Gimeno Traver	7	3	6
(United States) J Isner	4	4
WC	(Spain) P Andújar	6	6
14	(Japan) K Nishikori	7	6
(Serbia) V Troicki	5	2
(Czech Republic) R Štěpánek	3	3
2	(Switzerland) R Federer	6	6

Third round
(Spain) D Gimeno Traver	5^{r}
WC	(Spain) P Andújar	5
14	(Japan) K Nishikori	6	1	6
2	(Switzerland) R Federer	4	6	2

Quarterfinals
WC	(Spain) P Andújar	6	7
14	(Japan) K Nishikori	3	5

== Qualifying ==
=== Seeds ===
1. (Australia) Marinko Matosevic (qualifying competition, lucky loser)
2. (Belgium) Xavier Malisse (qualified)
3. (France) Michaël Llodra (qualifying competition)
4. (Argentina) Carlos Berlocq (first round)
5. (Colombia) Alejandro Falla (first round)
6. (Spain) Guillermo García López (qualified)
7. (Netherlands) Igor Sijsling (qualifying competition)
8. (Netherlands) Robin Haase (qualified)
9. (France) Paul-Henri Mathieu (qualifying competition, retired)
10. (Germany) Tobias Kamke (qualified)
11. (Russia) Evgeny Donskoy (first round)
12. (Colombia) Santiago Giraldo (qualified)
13. (France) Guillaume Rufin (first round)
14. (Canada) Jesse Levine (qualified)

=== Qualifiers ===
1. (Germany) Tobias Kamke
2. (Belgium) Xavier Malisse
3. (Netherlands) Robin Haase
4. (Colombia) Santiago Giraldo
5. (Brazil) João Souza
6. (Spain) Guillermo García López
7. (Canada) Jesse Levine

=== Lucky loser ===
1. (Australia) Marinko Matosevic

=== Qualifying draw ===
==== First qualifier ====
First round
1	(Australia) Marinko Matosevic	4	7^{7}	4
(Colombia) Alejandro González	6	6^{5}	4^{r}
WC	(Spain) Carlos Gómez-Herrera	3	1
10	(Germany) Tobias Kamke	6	6

Qualifying competition
1	(Australia) Marinko Matosevic	5	2
10	(Germany) Tobias Kamke	7	6

==== Second qualifier ====
First round
2	(Belgium) Xavier Malisse	1	7^{8}	6
(Spain) Daniel Muñoz de la Nava	6	6^{6}	2
WC	(Spain) Pere Riba	5	7	6
11	(Russia) Evgeny Donskoy	7	5	3

Qualifying competition
2	(Belgium) Xavier Malisse	6	3	6
WC	(Spain) Pere Riba	4	6	3

==== Third qualifier ====
First round
3	(France) Michaël Llodra	6^{3}	6	7
(Poland) Łukasz Kubot	7^{7}	4	5
WC	(Spain) Adam Sanjurjo Hermida	1	3
8	(Netherlands) Robin Haase	6	6

Qualifying competition
3	(France) Michaël Llodra	2	6	3
8	(Netherlands) Robin Haase	6	3	6

==== Fourth qualifier ====
First round
4	(Argentina) Carlos Berlocq	7^{7}	4	6^{7}
(Ukraine) Sergiy Stakhovsky	6^{5}	6	7
(Portugal) João Sousa	2	2
12	(Colombia) Santiago Giraldo	6	6

Qualifying competition
(Ukraine) Sergiy Stakhovsky	6^{4}	6	4
12	(Colombia) Santiago Giraldo	7^{7}	4	6

==== Fifth qualifier ====
First round
5	(Colombia) Alejandro Falla	1	7^{7}	3
(Brazil) João Souza	6	6^{2}	6
(Portugal) Gastão Elias	3	6^{4}
9	(France) Paul-Henri Mathieu	6	7

Qualifying competition
(Brazil) João Souza	1	7^{7}	4
9	(France) Paul-Henri Mathieu	6	6^{5}	1^{r}

==== Sixth qualifier ====
First round
6	(Spain) Guillermo García López	6	6
PR	(Russia) Igor Andreev	1	3
(Spain) Rubén Ramírez Hidalgo	7^{7}	6
13	(France) Guillaume Rufin	6^{4}	1

Qualifying competition
6	(Spain) Guillermo García López	7	2	7^{8}
(Spain) Rubén Ramírez Hidalgo	5	6	6^{6}

==== Seventh qualifier ====
First round
7	(Netherlands) Igor Sijsling	4	6	6
WC	(Spain) Arnau Brugués Davi	6	3	4
(Italy) Flavio Cipolla	1	6	3
14	(Canada) Jesse Levine	6	3	6

Qualifying competition
7	(Netherlands) Igor Sijsling	3	4
14	(Canada) Jesse Levine	6	6
