= 2013 Mutua Madrid Open =

- Date: 6–12 May
- Edition: 12th (ATP); 5th (WTA)
- Draw: 56S / 24D; 64S / 28D
- Prize money: €4,303,867 €4,033,254
- Surface: Clay
- Location: Madrid, Spain
- Venue: Park Manzanares

Champions

Men's singles
- (Spain) Rafael Nadal

Women's singles
- (United States) Serena Williams

Men's doubles
- (United States) Bob Bryan / (United States) Mike Bryan

Women's doubles
- (Russia) Anastasia Pavlyuchenkova / (Czech Republic) Lucie Šafářová
← 2012 ·	Madrid Open	· 2014 →

The 2013 Madrid Open (also known as the Mutua Madrid Open for sponsorship reasons) was a professional tennis tournament played on outdoor clay courts at the Park Manzanares in Madrid, Spain from 6–12 May. It was the 12th edition of the event on the ATP World Tour and 5th on the WTA Tour. It was classified as an ATP World Tour Masters 1000 event on the 2013 ATP World Tour and a Premier Mandatory event on the 2013 WTA Tour.

Ion Țiriac the former Romanian ATP player and now billionaire businessman is the current owner of the tournament.

== Points and prize money ==
=== Point distribution ===
Event	W	F	SF	QF	Round of 16	Round of 32	Round of 64	Q	Q2	Q1
Men's singles	1000	600	360	180	90	45	10	25	16	0
Men's doubles	1000	600	360	180	90	0	—	—	—	—
Women's singles	1000	700	450	250	140	80	5	30	20	1
Women's doubles	1000	700	450	250	140	5	—	—	—	—

=== Prize money ===
Event	W	F	SF	QF	Round of 16	Round of 32	Round of 64	Q2	Q1
Men's singles	€638,500	€313,070	€157,570	€80,120	€41,610	€21,935	€11,645	€2,750	€1,390
Women's singles	€643,000	€315,000	€158,500	€80,700	€39,000	€20,750	€9,630	€2,555	€1,150
Men's doubles	€197,730	€96,800	€48,560	€24,920	€12,880	€6,800	—	—	—
Women's doubles	€203,000	€102,034	€50,110	€23,000	€12,000	€6,300	—	—	—

== ATP singles main-draw entrants ==
=== Seeds ===
Country	Player	Rank^{1}	Seed
SRB	Novak Djokovic	1	1
SUI	Roger Federer	2	2
GBR	Andy Murray	3	3
ESP	David Ferrer	4	4
ESP	Rafael Nadal	5	5
CZE	Tomáš Berdych	6	6
FRA	Jo-Wilfried Tsonga	8	7
FRA	Richard Gasquet	9	8
SRB	Janko Tipsarević	10	9
CRO	Marin Čilić	11	10
ESP	Nicolás Almagro	12	11
CAN	Milos Raonic	13	12
GER	Tommy Haas	14	13
JPN	Kei Nishikori	15	14
SUI	Stanislas Wawrinka	16	15
FRA	Gilles Simon	17	16

- Rankings are as of 29 April 2013.

=== Other entrants ===
The following players received wildcards into the main draw:

- (Spain) Pablo Andújar
- (Romania) Marius Copil
- (Spain) Javier Martí
- (Spain) Tommy Robredo

The following players received entry from the qualifying draw:

- (Spain) Guillermo García López
- (Colombia) Santiago Giraldo
- (Netherlands) Robin Haase
- (Germany) Tobias Kamke
- (Canada) Jesse Levine
- (Belgium) Xavier Malisse
- (Brazil) João Souza

The following player received entry as lucky loser:

- (Australia) Marinko Matosevic

=== Withdrawals ===
Before the tournament

- (Brazil) Thomaz Bellucci (abdominal injury)
- (Argentina) Juan Martín del Potro (virus)
- (United States) Mardy Fish
- (Germany) Philipp Kohlschreiber

=== Retirements ===
- (Germany) Tobias Kamke (right hip injury)

== ATP doubles main-draw entrants ==
=== Seeds ===
Country	Player	Country	Player	Rank^{1}	Seed
USA	Bob Bryan	USA	Mike Bryan	2	1
ESP	Marcel Granollers	ESP	Marc López	7	2
SWE	Robert Lindstedt	CAN	Daniel Nestor	14	3
PAK	Aisam-ul-Haq Qureshi	NED	Jean-Julien Rojer	15	4
BLR	Max Mirnyi	ROU	Horia Tecău	18	5
IND	Mahesh Bhupathi	IND	Rohan Bopanna	21	6
AUT	Alexander Peya	BRA	Bruno Soares	32	7
AUT	Jürgen Melzer	IND	Leander Paes	43	8

- Rankings are as of 29 April 2013.

=== Other entrants ===
The following pairs received wildcards into the doubles main draw:

- (Spain) Nicolás Almagro / (Austria) Oliver Marach
- (Spain) Daniel Gimeno Traver / (Spain) Daniel Muñoz de la Nava

The following pair received entry as alternates:

- (Argentina) Juan Mónaco / (Argentina) Horacio Zeballos

=== Withdrawals ===
Before the tournament

- (Mexico) Santiago González (illness)

=== Retirements ===
- (Spain) Nicolás Almagro (left hip injury)

== WTA singles main-draw entrants ==
=== Seeds ===
Country	Player	Rank^{1}	Seed
USA	Serena Williams	1	1
RUS	Maria Sharapova	2	2
BLR	Victoria Azarenka	3	3
POL	Agnieszka Radwańska	4	4
CHN	Li Na	5	5
GER	Angelique Kerber	6	6
ITA	Sara Errani	7	7
CZE	Petra Kvitová	8	8
AUS	Samantha Stosur	9	9
DEN	Caroline Wozniacki	10	10
RUS	Nadia Petrova	11	11
ITA	Roberta Vinci	12	12
RUS	Maria Kirilenko	13	13
FRA	Marion Bartoli	14	14
SVK	Dominika Cibulková	15	15
SRB	Ana Ivanovic	16	16

- Rankings are as of 29 April 2013.

=== Other entrants ===
The following players received wildcards into the main draw:

- (Spain) Lourdes Domínguez Lino
- (Romania) Simona Halep
- (Slovakia) Daniela Hantuchová
- (Spain) Anabel Medina Garrigues
- (Spain) Sílvia Soler Espinosa

The following players received entry from the qualifying draw:

- (Romania) Alexandra Dulgheru
- (Italy) Camila Giorgi
- (United States) Bethanie Mattek-Sands
- (United States) Christina McHale
- (Kazakhstan) Yulia Putintseva
- (South Africa) Chanelle Scheepers
- (Spain) María Teresa Torró Flor
- (Ukraine) Lesia Tsurenko

The following players received entry as lucky losers:

- (United States) Madison Keys
- (Switzerland) Stefanie Vögele

=== Withdrawals ===
Before the tournament

- (Austria) Tamira Paszek (respiratory infection)
- (United States) Venus Williams (back injury)
- (United Kingdom) Heather Watson (mononucleosis)

During the tournament

- (Germany) Julia Görges
- (Kazakhstan) Yaroslava Shvedova (right arm injury)

=== Retirements ===
- (Japan) Ayumi Morita (left abductor strain)
- (Russia) Elena Vesnina (lumbar spine injury)
- (Czech Republic) Klára Zakopalová (asthma)

== WTA doubles main-draw entrants ==
=== Seeds ===
Country	Player	Country	Player	Rank^{1}	Seed
CZE	Andrea Hlaváčková	CZE	Lucie Hradecká	9	1
RUS	Nadia Petrova	SLO	Katarina Srebotnik	11	2
RUS	Ekaterina Makarova	RUS	Elena Vesnina	13	3
USA	Raquel Kops-Jones	USA	Abigail Spears	29	4
USA	Bethanie Mattek-Sands	IND	Sania Mirza	35	5
GER	Anna-Lena Grönefeld	CZE	Květa Peschke	39	6
CHN	Shuai Zhang	CHN	Zheng Jie	48	7
TPE	Hsieh Su-wei	CHN	Peng Shuai	51	8

- Rankings are as of 29 April 2013.

=== Other entrants ===
The following pairs received wildcards into the doubles main draw:

- (France) Alizé Cornet / (Italy) Francesca Schiavone
- (Serbia) Jelena Janković / (Croatia) Mirjana Lučić-Baroni
- (Spain) Garbiñe Muguruza / (Spain) María Teresa Torró Flor
- (Spain) Sílvia Soler Espinosa / (Spain) Carla Suárez Navarro

The following pair received entry as alternates:

- (Sweden) Sofia Arvidsson / (Sweden) Johanna Larsson

=== Withdrawals ===
Before the tournament

- (Romania) Monica Niculescu (right shoulder injury)
- (Austria) Tamira Paszek (respiratory infection)

== Finals ==
=== Men's singles ===
- (Spain) Rafael Nadal defeated (Switzerland) Stanislas Wawrinka, 6–2, 6–4

=== Women's singles ===
- (United States) Serena Williams defeated (Russia) Maria Sharapova, 6–1, 6–4

=== Men's doubles ===
- (United States) Bob Bryan / (United States) Mike Bryan defeated (Austria) Alexander Peya / (Brazil) Bruno Soares, 6–2, 6–3

=== Women's doubles ===
- (Russia) Anastasia Pavlyuchenkova / (Czech Republic) Lucie Šafářová defeated (Zimbabwe) Cara Black / (New Zealand) Marina Erakovic, 6–2, 6–4
