= 2013 International German Open =

- Date: 14–22 July
- Edition: 107th
- Category: ATP World Tour 500
- Draw: 48S / 16D
- Prize money: €1,102,500
- Surface: Clay / outdoor
- Location: Hamburg, Germany
- Venue: Am Rothenbaum

Champions

Singles
- (Italy) Fabio Fognini

Doubles
- (Poland) Mariusz Fyrstenberg / (Poland) Marcin Matkowski
- International German Open

The 2013 International German Open (also known as the bet–at–home Open – German Tennis Championships 2013 for sponsorship reasons) was a men's tennis tournament played on outdoor red clay courts. It was the 107th edition of the event known that year as the International German Open and was part of the ATP World Tour 500 series of the 2013 ATP World Tour. It took place at the Am Rothenbaum in Hamburg, Germany, from 14 July through 22 July 2013. Twelfth-seeded Fabio Fognini won the singles title.

== Finals ==
=== Singles ===
- (Italy) Fabio Fognini defeated (Argentina) Federico Delbonis, 4–6, 7–6^{(10–8)}, 6–2

=== Doubles ===
- (Poland) Mariusz Fyrstenberg / (Poland) Marcin Matkowski defeated (Austria) Alexander Peya / (Brazil) Bruno Soares, 3–6, 6–1, [10–8]

== Points and prize money ==
=== Points distribution ===
Event	W	F	SF	QF	Round of 16	Round of 32	Round of 64	Q	Q2	Q1
Singles	500	300	180	90	45	20	0	10	4	0
Doubles	500	300	180	90	0	—N/a	—N/a	—N/a	—N/a	—N/a

=== Prize money ===
Event	W	F	SF	QF	Round of 16	Round of 32	Round of 64	Q2	Q1
Singles	€251,200	€114,510	€53,340	€25,460	€12,390	€6,600	€3,840	€710	€370
Doubles	€78,360	€35,360	€16,680	€8,060	€4,120	—N/a	—N/a	—N/a	—N/a

== Singles main draw entrants ==
=== Seeds ===
Country	Player	Rank^{1}	Seed
SUI	Roger Federer	5	1
GER	Tommy Haas	11	2
ESP	Nicolás Almagro	16	3
POL	Jerzy Janowicz	17	4
ARG	Juan Mónaco	20	5
ITA	Andreas Seppi	23	6
UKR	Alexandr Dolgopolov	24	7
FRA	Jérémy Chardy	26	8
FRA	Benoît Paire	27	9
ESP	Tommy Robredo	28	10
ESP	Feliciano López	30	11
ITA	Fabio Fognini	31	12
RUS	Mikhail Youzhny	32	13
ESP	Fernando Verdasco	35	14
LAT	Ernests Gulbis	36	15
SVK	Martin Kližan	38	16

- ^{1} Rankings are as of July 8, 2013

=== Other entrants ===
The following players received wildcards into the singles main draw:

- (Switzerland) Roger Federer
- (Germany) Julian Reister
- (Germany) Jan-Lennard Struff
- (Germany) Alexander Zverev

The following players received entry from the qualifying draw:

- (Argentina) Federico Delbonis
- (Kazakhstan) Andrey Golubev
- (Czech Republic) Jan Hájek
- (Slovenia) Blaž Kavčič
- (Poland) Łukasz Kubot
- (Argentina) Diego Sebastián Schwartzman

=== Withdrawals ===
Before the tournament

- (Uruguay) Pablo Cuevas
- (Austria) Jürgen Melzer
- (Finland) Jarkko Nieminen
- (France) Gilles Simon
- (Australia) Bernard Tomic

=== Retirements ===
- (Poland) Jerzy Janowicz (right arm injury)

== Doubles main draw entrants ==
=== Seeds ===
Country	Player	Country	Player	Rank^{1}	Seed
ESP	Marcel Granollers	ESP	Marc López	7	1
AUT	Alexander Peya	BRA	Bruno Soares	15	2
ESP	David Marrero	ESP	Fernando Verdasco	35	3
AUT	Julian Knowle	SWE	Robert Lindstedt	42	4

- Rankings are as of July 8, 2013

=== Other entrants ===
The following pairs received wildcards into the doubles main draw:

- (Germany) Andre Begemann / (Germany) Martin Emmrich
- (Germany) Daniel Brands / (Germany) Christopher Kas

=== Withdrawals ===
During the tournament

- (Spain) David Marrero (right calf injury)
- (France) Benoît Paire (elbow injury)
