= 2010 Abierto Internacional Varonil Casablanca Cancún – Doubles =

Doubles
- 2010 Abierto Internacional Varonil Casablanca Cancún

Final
- Champions: (Dominican Republic) Víctor Estrella (Mexico) Santiago González
- Runners-up: (Austria) Rainer Eitzinger (Mexico) César Ramírez
- Score: 6–1, 7–6(3)

Events
Singles	Doubles
← 2009 ·	Abierto Internacional Varonil Casablanca Cancún	· 2011 →

Andre Begemann and Leonardo Tavares were the defending champions, but decided not to participate this year.
Víctor Estrella and Santiago González won the final against Rainer Eitzinger and César Ramírez 6–1, 7–6(3).

== Seeds ==
1. (Dominican Republic) Víctor Estrella / (Mexico) Santiago González (champions)
2. (Serbia) Nikola Ćirić / (Montenegro) Goran Tošić (first round)
3. (Ecuador) Júlio César Campozano / (Argentina) Brian Dabul (semifinals, withdrew)
4. (Argentina) Facundo Bagnis / (Argentina) Diego Junqueira (quarterfinals)

== Draw ==
=== Key ===
- Q = Qualifier
- WC = Wild card
- LL = Lucky loser
- Alt = Alternate
- SE = Special exempt
- PR = Protected ranking
- ITF = ITF entry
- JE = Junior exempt
- w/o = Walkover
- r = Retired
- d = Defaulted
- SR = Special ranking

=== Draw ===
First round
1	(Dominican Republic) V Estrella (Mexico) S González	6	6
(Ecuador) I Endara (United States) G Ouellette	2	4
(France) A Gensse (France) É Prodon	6	6
(United States) M Sykut (United States) D Zivkovic	2	3
4	(Argentina) F Bagnis (Argentina) D Junqueira	6	1	[12]
(Mexico) L Díaz Barriga (Mexico) MÁ Reyes Varela	4	6	[10]
WC	(Mexico) D Garza (Mexico) G Loza	6	7
(Argentina) S Decoud (Mexico) J Herrera-Eguiluz	0	5
WC	(Uruguay) A Behar (Argentina) C Berlocq	3	2
(Brazil) L Kirche (Brazil) J Silva	6	6
(France) T Cazes-Carrère (Portugal) P Sousa	3	4
3	(Ecuador) JC Campozano (Argentina) B Dabul	6	6
WC	(United States) M Ein (United States) K Kim	6
(Italy) A Arnaboldi (Italy) G Naso	3	r
(Austria) R Eitzinger (Mexico) C Ramírez	6	7
2	(Serbia) N Ćirić (Montenegro) G Tošić	2	5

Quarterfinals
1	(Dominican Republic) V Estrella (Mexico) S González	6	7
(France) A Gensse (France) É Prodon	3	5
4	(Argentina) F Bagnis (Argentina) D Junqueira	3	4
WC	(Mexico) D Garza (Mexico) G Loza	6	6
(Brazil) L Kirche (Brazil) J Silva	1	4
3	(Ecuador) JC Campozano (Argentina) B Dabul	6	6
WC	(United States) M Ein (United States) K Kim	2	1
(Austria) R Eitzinger (Mexico) C Ramírez	6	6

Semifinals
1	(Dominican Republic) V Estrella (Mexico) S González	6	6
WC	(Mexico) D Garza (Mexico) G Loza	1	3
3	(Ecuador) JC Campozano (Argentina) B Dabul	w/o
(Austria) R Eitzinger (Mexico) C Ramírez

Final
1	(Dominican Republic) V Estrella (Mexico) S González	6	7
(Austria) R Eitzinger (Mexico) C Ramírez	1	6^{3}
