= 2013 Rafael Nadal tennis season =

Statistics for Spanish tennis player

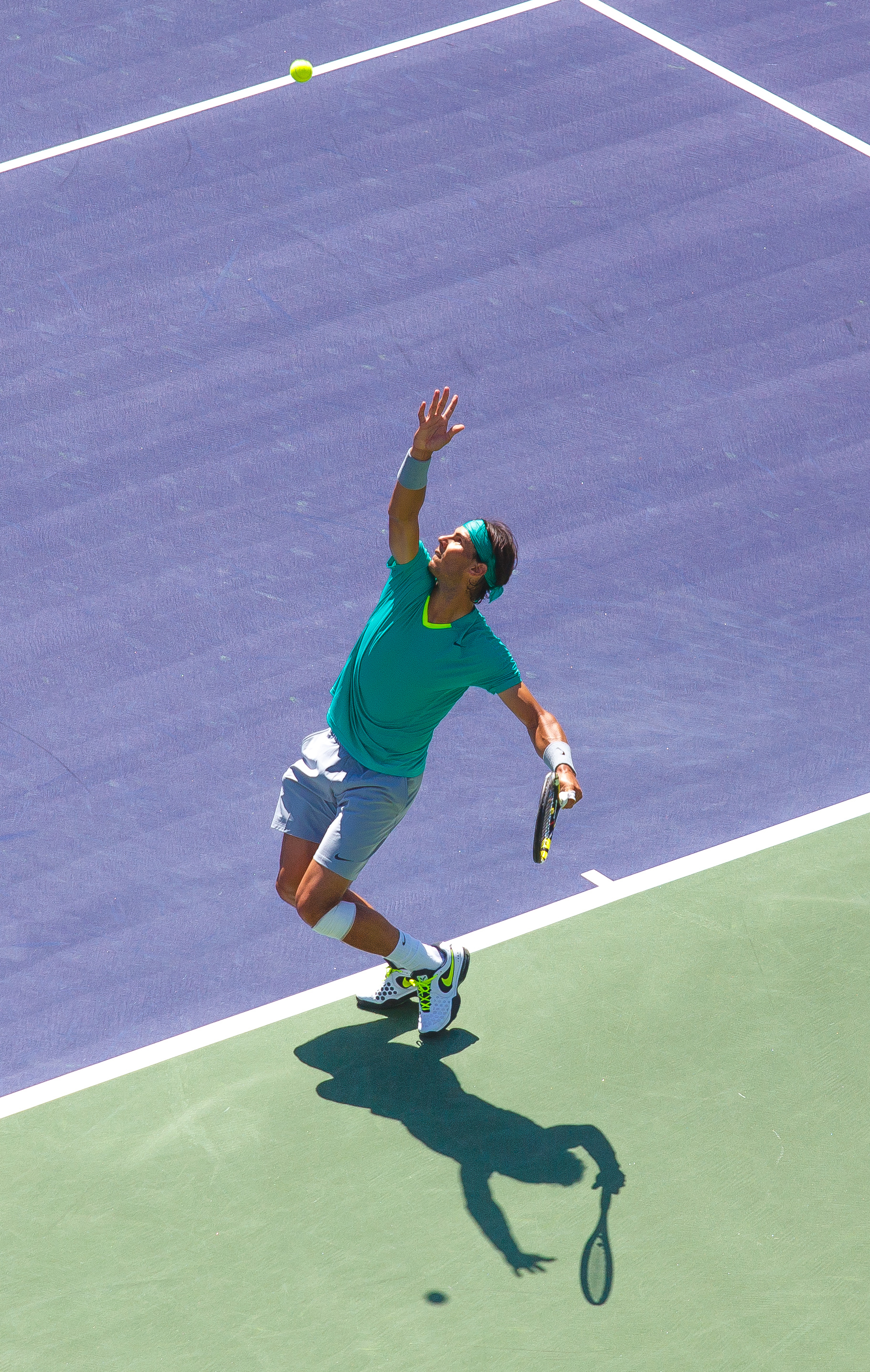
- Full name: Rafael "Rafa" Nadal Parera
- Country: Spain
- Calendar prize money: $14,570,937 (singles & doubles)

Singles
- Season record: 75-7 (91.46%)
- Calendar titles: 10
- Year-end ranking: No. 1
- Ranking change from previous year: ▲3

Grand Slam & significant results
- Australian Open: A
- French Open: W
- Wimbledon: 1R
- US Open: W

Doubles
- Season record: 6–1 (85.71%)
- Calendar titles: 0
- Current ranking: No. 376
- Ranking change from previous year: ▼314

Davis Cup
- Davis Cup: World Group
- Injuries: N/A
- Last updated on: October 11, 2013.

The 2013 Rafael Nadal tennis season is regarded as one of the greatest comeback seasons of all time. After not playing since June of the previous year, his season began on February 5 with the Chile Open, where he finished as the runner-up. Nadal rebounded with title victories at São Paulo and Acapulco. He then won the first Masters event of the year at Indian Wells. Nadal next finished runner-up to Novak Djokovic at Monte-Carlo, breaking his consecutive win streak for the first time in nine years. He followed that with victories at Barcelona, Madrid, and Rome. At the French Open, he defeated Djokovic in an epic semifinal, before defeating David Ferrer to win his eighth French Open crown. He was then stunned by Steve Darcis in the first round of Wimbledon, in what would be his only defeat prior to the semifinals of a tournament all season. Limping in the final set of the match, many thought his season was over. However, a strong hardcourt summer saw Nadal sweep Montreal, Cincinnati, and then the US Open (def. Djokovic), thus achieving the Summer Slam and clinching the US Open Series. He became the third player in history, after Patrick Rafter and Andy Roddick, to win all three events in succession. This granted him US$3.6 million in prize money, the most money earned by a male tennis player at a single tournament. A few days after the US Open final, he flew to Madrid to help the Spanish Davis Cup team secure their World Group Playoff spot for 2014, with a singles victory against Sergiy Stakhovsky and a doubles victory with Marc López.

== Year summary ==
=== South American clay court season ===
Following 222 days injured, Nadal returned to the tennis court on February 5 at the Chile Open. He played both single and double-events and reached the final in both tournaments. At the double-event he partnered up with the Argentine Juan Mónaco.

The next event for Nadal was the Brasil Open. He again played both the singles and doubles events, in which he partnered up with David Nalbandian who also was his opponent in the final of the singles event. Nadal managed to overcome Nalbandian to win his first title in 2013.

Two weeks later Nadal played the Mexico Open, where he beat David Ferrer in the final to win his second title in a row. Following the Golden Swing Nadal confirmed his participation for the hardcourt event BNP Paribas Open in Indian Wells in the USA taking place from March 4 to March 18.

=== Indian Wells ===
In Indian Wells Nadal received a Bye in the first round. In the second round he faced Ryan Harrison and managed to beat him in straight sets. Nadal was drawn to face Leonardo Mayer next, but Mayer withdrew from the tournament due to an injury. Nadal's next opponent was Ernests Gulbis who was on a thirteen match winning streak before Nadal defeated him in three tight sets to reach the quarterfinals where he played against his long-time rival Roger Federer. Nadal was able to overcome Federer in two sets. In the semifinals he played the World No. 6 Tomáš Berdych and managed again to win in two sets, which helped him to reach the final for the fourth time in his career. His opponent was Juan Martín del Potro who had previously beaten world No. 1 Novak Djokovic in the semifinals. Nadal defeated del Potro in three sets, winning his record-breaking twenty-second ATP Masters 1000 event and his third Indian Wells title. Nadal subsequently withdrew from the Sony Ericsson Open in Miami in order to rest and prepare for the clay court season.

=== European Clay Court Season ===
At Monte-Carlo Nadal reached his ninth straight final but lost in two sets to Djokovic. He won in Barcelona in straight sets and then won the Madrid title for a record-breaking 23rd Masters 1000 title, before extending the record to 24 with three top 6 wins in a row against Ferrer, Berdych, and then Federer in an easy two set victory at the 2013 Rome Masters. Nadal capped off his streak with a ninth straight final this year at the 2013 French Open, defeating Djokovic in an epic semi-final match that finished 9–7 in the fifth set. Nadal won the first set and led in the second by a break, but Djokovic then took four straight games to win the set. Nadal responded by dominating the third and led twice by a break in the fourth, but Djokovic broke back on both occasions. As a result, Nadal failed to serve out the match and faltered in the subsequent tiebreak. The momentum seemed to be with Djokovic, who broke at the beginning of the fifth and led 4–2 before Nadal made an impressive comeback. The match was reminiscent of their 2012 encounter at the Australian Open final. This time the match time was 4:37. In the final Nadal thrashed an in-form Ferrer in straight sets, breaking his own record and winning an unprecedented 8th French Open Championship.

During the European clay season, Nadal earned a total of 5,100 points, making it (as of 2023) its most successful year in his entire career.

=== Grass Court Season ===
Nadal withdrew from Halle and played at Wimbledon. He was on a 22 match winning streak, when for the first time in his career, he lost a first round match at a Grand Slam, losing in three sets to lower-ranked Steve Darcis of Belgium. Many people speculated that this was the end of the year for Nadal, who was limping and visibly uncomfortable in his match.

=== American Hard Court Season ===
Nadal took a break after Wimbledon. He regained his form in Montreal, destroying dangerous server Jerzy Janowicz in the first round. He then put up a strong performance to beat No.1 Djokovic on the hard courts during the semifinal, beating him in the tie-breaker in the final set. He defeated Milos Raonic in the final in straight sets to win his third title in Montreal and a record 25th masters title. Nadal broke his own record yet again and won his 26th ATP Masters 1000 in Cincinnati Masters, beating Benjamin Becker, Dimitrov, Federer in the QF, Tomas Berdych, and finally John Isner in the final on Sunday 18 August. Nadal entered the final Major of the year having missed the previous edition last year due to injury. Cruising through the first three rounds, he defeated Philipp Kohlschreiber in 4 sets in the 4th round, and then reached the final in winning the rest of matches in straight sets. In the final, Nadal yet again faced Djokovic. This was their 6th meeting in a Major final. Rafa took the first set, Novak took the second. But Rafa then gained momentum and won the next two sets to win the title. Thus Rafael Nadal won his second US Open Championship, and his 13th Major overall, putting him third on the all-time list behind Federer (17) and Sampras (14). He became the 3rd player after Patrick Rafter and Andy Roddick to win the Summer Slam (Won Canada, Cincinnati, and the US Open in the same year). He remained undefeated so far on Hard Courts in 2013.

=== Asian Fall & Indoor Hard Court Season ===
At the China Open Nadal returned to the No.1 ranking by reaching the final. He had a noteworthy comeback in the quarter-finals against Fabio Fognini, where he fought back from a set and break down to secure the victory. In the final he lost to Djokovic in two sets. Nadal was defeated at the Shanghai Masters by del Potro in the semi-finals. Nadal's final tournament of the year before the World Tour Finals was at the Paris Masters. In Paris, Nadal reached the semifinals where he was defeated by compatriot David Ferrer for the first time in their last 10 head-to-head meeting. At the Barclays ATP World Tour Finals Nadal was unbeaten (3–0) in round robin play and by winning his first 2 matches sealed the Year End ATP World No. 1 Ranking in the process. In the semifinals Nadal faced long time rival Roger Federer, and recorded his first indoor win against the Swiss at the ATP World Tour Finals in straight sets. In the final he faced Novak Djokovic but lost in straight sets.

== All matches ==
Key
W	F	SF	QF	#R	RR	Q#	P#	DNQ	A	Z#	PO	G	S	B	NMS	NTI	P	NH

(W) winner; (F) finalist; (SF) semifinalist; (QF) quarterfinalist; (#R) rounds 4, 3, 2, 1; (RR) round-robin stage; (Q#) qualification round; (P#) preliminary round; (DNQ) did not qualify; (A) absent; (Z#) Davis/Fed Cup Zonal Group (with number indication) or (PO) play-off; (G) gold, (S) silver or (B) bronze Olympic/Paralympic medal; (NMS) not a Masters tournament; (NTI) not a Tier I tournament; (P) postponed; (NH) not held; (SR) strike rate (events won / competed); (W–L) win–loss record.
To avoid confusion and double counting, these charts are updated at the conclusion of a tournament or when the player's participation has ended.

=== Singles matches ===
Tournament	Match	Round	Opponent	Rank	Result	Score
Chile Open; Viña del Mar, Chile; ATP World Tour 250; Clay, outdoor February 4–10, 2013	–	1R	Bye			
Chile Open; Viña del Mar, Chile; ATP World Tour 250; Clay, outdoor February 4–10, 2013	1 / 706	2R	(Argentina) Federico Delbonis	122	Win	6–3, 6–2
Chile Open; Viña del Mar, Chile; ATP World Tour 250; Clay, outdoor February 4–10, 2013	2 / 707	QF	(Spain) Daniel Gimeno-Traver	60	Win	6–1, 6–4
Chile Open; Viña del Mar, Chile; ATP World Tour 250; Clay, outdoor February 4–10, 2013	3 / 708	SF	(France) Jérémy Chardy	25	Win	6–2, 6–2
Chile Open; Viña del Mar, Chile; ATP World Tour 250; Clay, outdoor February 4–10, 2013	4 / 709	F	(Argentina) Horacio Zeballos	73	Loss (1)	7–6^{(7–2)}, 6–7^{(6–8)}, 4–6
Brasil Open; São Paulo, Brazil; ATP World Tour 250; Clay, indoor February 11–17, 2013	–	1R	Bye			
Brasil Open; São Paulo, Brazil; ATP World Tour 250; Clay, indoor February 11–17, 2013	5 / 710	2R	(Brazil) João Souza	140	Win	6–3, 6–4
Brasil Open; São Paulo, Brazil; ATP World Tour 250; Clay, indoor February 11–17, 2013	6 / 711	QF	(Argentina) Carlos Berlocq	78	Win	3–6, 6–4, 6–4
Brasil Open; São Paulo, Brazil; ATP World Tour 250; Clay, indoor February 11–17, 2013	7 / 712	SF	(Argentina) Martín Alund	111	Win	6–3, 6–7^{(2–7)}, 6–1
Brasil Open; São Paulo, Brazil; ATP World Tour 250; Clay, indoor February 11–17, 2013	8 / 713	W	(Argentina) David Nalbandian	93	Win (1)	6–2, 6–3
Abierto Mexicano Telcel; Acapulco, Mexico; ATP World Tour 500; Clay, outdoor February 25– March 2, 2013	9 / 714	1R	(Argentina) Diego Schwartzman	157	Win	6–2, 6–2
Abierto Mexicano Telcel; Acapulco, Mexico; ATP World Tour 500; Clay, outdoor February 25– March 2, 2013	10 / 715	2R	(Argentina) Martín Alund	91	Win	6–0, 6–4
Abierto Mexicano Telcel; Acapulco, Mexico; ATP World Tour 500; Clay, outdoor February 25– March 2, 2013	11 / 716	QF	(Argentina) Leonardo Mayer	77	Win	6–1, 7–5
Abierto Mexicano Telcel; Acapulco, Mexico; ATP World Tour 500; Clay, outdoor February 25– March 2, 2013	12 / 717	SF	(Spain) Nicolás Almagro	12	Win	7–5, 6–4
Abierto Mexicano Telcel; Acapulco, Mexico; ATP World Tour 500; Clay, outdoor February 25– March 2, 2013	13 / 718	W	(Spain) David Ferrer	4	Win (2)	6–0, 6–2
BNP Paribas Open; Indian Wells, United States; ATP World Tour Masters 1000; Hardcourt, outdoor March 7–17, 2013	–	1R	Bye			
BNP Paribas Open; Indian Wells, United States; ATP World Tour Masters 1000; Hardcourt, outdoor March 7–17, 2013	14 / 719	2R	(United States) Ryan Harrison	73	Win	7–6^{(7–3)}, 6–2
BNP Paribas Open; Indian Wells, United States; ATP World Tour Masters 1000; Hardcourt, outdoor March 7–17, 2013	–	3R	(Argentina) Leonardo Mayer	64	Walkover	N/A
BNP Paribas Open; Indian Wells, United States; ATP World Tour Masters 1000; Hardcourt, outdoor March 7–17, 2013	15 / 720	4R	(Latvia) Ernests Gulbis	67	Win	4–6, 6–4, 7–5
BNP Paribas Open; Indian Wells, United States; ATP World Tour Masters 1000; Hardcourt, outdoor March 7–17, 2013	16 / 721	QF	(Switzerland) Roger Federer	2	Win	6–4, 6–2
BNP Paribas Open; Indian Wells, United States; ATP World Tour Masters 1000; Hardcourt, outdoor March 7–17, 2013	17 / 722	SF	(Czech Republic) Tomáš Berdych	6	Win	6–4, 7–5
BNP Paribas Open; Indian Wells, United States; ATP World Tour Masters 1000; Hardcourt, outdoor March 7–17, 2013	18 / 723	W	(Argentina) Juan Martín del Potro	7	Win (3)	4–6, 6–3, 6–4
Monte-Carlo Rolex Masters; Monte Carlo, Monaco; ATP World Tour Masters 1000; Clay, outdoor April 14–21, 2013	–	1R	Bye			
Monte-Carlo Rolex Masters; Monte Carlo, Monaco; ATP World Tour Masters 1000; Clay, outdoor April 14–21, 2013	19 / 724	2R	(Australia) Marinko Matosevic	54	Win	6–1, 6–2
Monte-Carlo Rolex Masters; Monte Carlo, Monaco; ATP World Tour Masters 1000; Clay, outdoor April 14–21, 2013	20 / 725	3R	(Germany) Philipp Kohlschreiber	21	Win	6–2, 6–4
Monte-Carlo Rolex Masters; Monte Carlo, Monaco; ATP World Tour Masters 1000; Clay, outdoor April 14–21, 2013	21 / 726	QF	(Bulgaria) Grigor Dimitrov	34	Win	6–2, 2–6, 6–4
Monte-Carlo Rolex Masters; Monte Carlo, Monaco; ATP World Tour Masters 1000; Clay, outdoor April 14–21, 2013	22 / 727	SF	(France) Jo-Wilfried Tsonga	8	Win	6–3, 7–6^{(7–3)}
Monte-Carlo Rolex Masters; Monte Carlo, Monaco; ATP World Tour Masters 1000; Clay, outdoor April 14–21, 2013	23 / 728	F	(Serbia) Novak Djokovic	1	Loss (2)	2–6, 6–7^{(1–7)}
Barcelona Open Banco Sabadell; Barcelona, Spain; ATP World Tour 500; Clay, outdoor April 22–28, 2013	–	1R	Bye			
Barcelona Open Banco Sabadell; Barcelona, Spain; ATP World Tour 500; Clay, outdoor April 22–28, 2013	24 / 729	2R	(Argentina) Carlos Berlocq	63	Win	6–4, 6–2
Barcelona Open Banco Sabadell; Barcelona, Spain; ATP World Tour 500; Clay, outdoor April 22–28, 2013	25 / 730	3R	(France) Benoît Paire	33	Win	7–6^{(7–2)}, 6–2
Barcelona Open Banco Sabadell; Barcelona, Spain; ATP World Tour 500; Clay, outdoor April 22–28, 2013	26 / 731	QF	(Spain) Albert Ramos	64	Win	6–3, 6–0
Barcelona Open Banco Sabadell; Barcelona, Spain; ATP World Tour 500; Clay, outdoor April 22–28, 2013	27 / 732	SF	(Canada) Milos Raonic	13	Win	6–4, 6–0
Barcelona Open Banco Sabadell; Barcelona, Spain; ATP World Tour 500; Clay, outdoor April 22–28, 2013	28 / 733	W	(Spain) Nicolás Almagro	12	Win (4)	6–4, 6–3
Mutua Madrid Open; Madrid, Spain; ATP World Tour Masters 1000; Clay, outdoor May 5–12, 2013	–	1R	Bye			
Mutua Madrid Open; Madrid, Spain; ATP World Tour Masters 1000; Clay, outdoor May 5–12, 2013	29 / 734	2R	(France) Benoît Paire	37	Win	6–3, 6–4
Mutua Madrid Open; Madrid, Spain; ATP World Tour Masters 1000; Clay, outdoor May 5–12, 2013	30 / 735	3R	(Russia) Mikhail Youzhny	31	Win	6–2, 6–3
Mutua Madrid Open; Madrid, Spain; ATP World Tour Masters 1000; Clay, outdoor May 5–12, 2013	31 / 736	QF	(Spain) David Ferrer	4	Win	4–6, 7–6^{(7–3)}, 6–0
Mutua Madrid Open; Madrid, Spain; ATP World Tour Masters 1000; Clay, outdoor May 5–12, 2013	32 / 737	SF	(Spain) Pablo Andújar	113	Win	6–0, 6–4
Mutua Madrid Open; Madrid, Spain; ATP World Tour Masters 1000; Clay, outdoor May 5–12, 2013	33 / 738	W	(Switzerland) Stanislas Wawrinka	15	Win (5)	6–2, 6–4
Internazionali BNL d'Italia; Rome, Italy; ATP World Tour Masters 1000; Clay, outdoor May 12–19, 2013	–	1R	Bye			
Internazionali BNL d'Italia; Rome, Italy; ATP World Tour Masters 1000; Clay, outdoor May 12–19, 2013	34 / 739	2R	(Italy) Fabio Fognini	25	Win	6–1, 6–3
Internazionali BNL d'Italia; Rome, Italy; ATP World Tour Masters 1000; Clay, outdoor May 12–19, 2013	35 / 740	3R	(Latvia) Ernests Gulbis	46	Win	1–6, 7–5, 6–4
Internazionali BNL d'Italia; Rome, Italy; ATP World Tour Masters 1000; Clay, outdoor May 12–19, 2013	36 / 741	QF	(Spain) David Ferrer	4	Win	6–4, 4–6, 6–2
Internazionali BNL d'Italia; Rome, Italy; ATP World Tour Masters 1000; Clay, outdoor May 12–19, 2013	37 / 742	SF	(Czech Republic) Tomáš Berdych	6	Win	6–2, 6–4
Internazionali BNL d'Italia; Rome, Italy; ATP World Tour Masters 1000; Clay, outdoor May 12–19, 2013	38 / 743	W	(Switzerland) Roger Federer	3	Win (6)	6–1, 6–3
French Open; Paris, France; Grand Slam tournament Clay, outdoor May 26– June 9, 2013	39 / 744	1R	(Germany) Daniel Brands	59	Win	4–6, 7–6^{(7–4)}, 6–4, 6–3
French Open; Paris, France; Grand Slam tournament Clay, outdoor May 26– June 9, 2013	40 / 745	2R	(Slovakia) Martin Kližan	35	Win	4–6, 6–3, 6–3, 6–3
French Open; Paris, France; Grand Slam tournament Clay, outdoor May 26– June 9, 2013	41 / 746	3R	(Italy) Fabio Fognini	29	Win	7–6^{(7–5)}, 6–4, 6–4
French Open; Paris, France; Grand Slam tournament Clay, outdoor May 26– June 9, 2013	42 / 747	4R	(Japan) Kei Nishikori	15	Win	6–4, 6–1, 6–3
French Open; Paris, France; Grand Slam tournament Clay, outdoor May 26– June 9, 2013	43 / 748	QF	(Switzerland) Stanislas Wawrinka	10	Win	6–2, 6–3, 6–1
French Open; Paris, France; Grand Slam tournament Clay, outdoor May 26– June 9, 2013	44 / 749	SF	(Serbia) Novak Djokovic	1	Win	6–4, 3–6, 6–1, 6–7^{(3–7)}, 9–7
French Open; Paris, France; Grand Slam tournament Clay, outdoor May 26– June 9, 2013	45 / 750	W	(Spain) David Ferrer	5	Win (7)	6–3, 6–2, 6–3
Wimbledon Championships; London, United Kingdom; Grand Slam tournament Grass, outdoor June 24– July 7, 2013	46 / 751	1R	(Belgium) Steve Darcis	135	Loss	6–7^{(4–7)}, 6–7^{(8–10)}, 4–6
Rogers Cup; Montreal, Canada; ATP World Tour Masters 1000; Hardcourt, outdoor August 5–11, 2013	–	1R	Bye			
Rogers Cup; Montreal, Canada; ATP World Tour Masters 1000; Hardcourt, outdoor August 5–11, 2013	47 / 752	2R	(Canada) Jesse Levine	132	Win	6–2, 6–0
Rogers Cup; Montreal, Canada; ATP World Tour Masters 1000; Hardcourt, outdoor August 5–11, 2013	48 / 753	3R	(Poland) Jerzy Janowicz	18	Win	7–6^{(8–6)}, 6–4
Rogers Cup; Montreal, Canada; ATP World Tour Masters 1000; Hardcourt, outdoor August 5–11, 2013	49 / 754	QF	(Australia) Marinko Matosevic	74	Win	6–2, 6–4
Rogers Cup; Montreal, Canada; ATP World Tour Masters 1000; Hardcourt, outdoor August 5–11, 2013	50 / 755	SF	(Serbia) Novak Djokovic	1	Win	6–4, 3–6, 7–6^{(7–2)}
Rogers Cup; Montreal, Canada; ATP World Tour Masters 1000; Hardcourt, outdoor August 5–11, 2013	51 / 756	W	(Canada) Milos Raonic	13	Win (8)	6–2, 6–2
Western & Southern Open; Cincinnati, United States; ATP World Tour Masters 1000; Hardcourt, outdoor August 11–18, 2013	–	1R	Bye			
Western & Southern Open; Cincinnati, United States; ATP World Tour Masters 1000; Hardcourt, outdoor August 11–18, 2013	52 / 757	2R	(Germany) Benjamin Becker	100	Win	6–2, 6–2
Western & Southern Open; Cincinnati, United States; ATP World Tour Masters 1000; Hardcourt, outdoor August 11–18, 2013	53 / 758	3R	(Bulgaria) Grigor Dimitrov	29	Win	6–2, 5–7, 6–2
Western & Southern Open; Cincinnati, United States; ATP World Tour Masters 1000; Hardcourt, outdoor August 11–18, 2013	54 / 759	QF	(Switzerland) Roger Federer	5	Win	5–7, 6–4, 6–3
Western & Southern Open; Cincinnati, United States; ATP World Tour Masters 1000; Hardcourt, outdoor August 11–18, 2013	55 / 760	SF	(Czech Republic) Tomas Berdych	6	Win	7–5, 7–6^{(7–4)}
Western & Southern Open; Cincinnati, United States; ATP World Tour Masters 1000; Hardcourt, outdoor August 11–18, 2013	56 / 761	W	(United States) John Isner	22	Win (9)	7–6^{(10–8)}, 7–6^{(7–3)}
US Open; New York City, United States; Grand Slam tournament Hardcourt, outdoor August 26– September 9, 2013	57 / 762	1R	(United States) Ryan Harrison	97	Win	6–4, 6–2, 6–2
US Open; New York City, United States; Grand Slam tournament Hardcourt, outdoor August 26– September 9, 2013	58 / 763	2R	(Brazil) Rogerio Dutra Silva	134	Win	6–2, 6–1, 6–0
US Open; New York City, United States; Grand Slam tournament Hardcourt, outdoor August 26– September 9, 2013	59 / 764	3R	(Croatia) Ivan Dodig	38	Win	6–4, 6–3, 6–3
US Open; New York City, United States; Grand Slam tournament Hardcourt, outdoor August 26– September 9, 2013	60 / 765	4R	(Germany) Philipp Kohlschreiber	25	Win	6–7^{(4–7)}, 6–4, 6–3, 6–1
US Open; New York City, United States; Grand Slam tournament Hardcourt, outdoor August 26– September 9, 2013	61 / 766	QF	(Spain) Tommy Robredo	22	Win	6–0, 6–2, 6–2
US Open; New York City, United States; Grand Slam tournament Hardcourt, outdoor August 26– September 9, 2013	62 / 767	SF	(France) Richard Gasquet	9	Win	6–4, 7–6^{(7–1)}, 6–2
US Open; New York City, United States; Grand Slam tournament Hardcourt, outdoor August 26– September 9, 2013	63 / 768	W	(Serbia) Novak Djokovic	1	Win (10)	6–2, 3–6, 6–4, 6–1
Davis Cup World Group; Playoffs: Spain vs Ukraine; Madrid, Spain; Davis Cup; Clay, outdoor September 13–15, 2013	64 / 769	RR2	(Ukraine) Sergiy Stakhovsky	92	Win	6–0, 6–0, 6–4
China Open; Beijing, China; ATP World Tour 500; Hardcourt, outdoor September 30– October 6, 2013	65 / 770	1R	(Colombia) Santiago Giraldo	87	Win	6–2, 6–4
China Open; Beijing, China; ATP World Tour 500; Hardcourt, outdoor September 30– October 6, 2013	66 / 771	2R	(Germany) Philipp Kohlschreiber	25	Win	6–4, 7–6^{(7–3)}
China Open; Beijing, China; ATP World Tour 500; Hardcourt, outdoor September 30– October 6, 2013	67 / 772	QF	(Italy) Fabio Fognini	19	Win	2–6, 6–4, 6–1
China Open; Beijing, China; ATP World Tour 500; Hardcourt, outdoor September 30– October 6, 2013	68 / 773	SF	(Czech Republic) Tomas Berdych	5	Win	4–2 ret.
China Open; Beijing, China; ATP World Tour 500; Hardcourt, outdoor September 30– October 6, 2013	69 / 774	F	(Serbia) Novak Djokovic	1	Loss (3)	3–6, 4–6
Shanghai Rolex Masters; Shanghai, China; ATP World Tour Masters 1000; Hardcourt, outdoor October 6–13, 2013	–	1R	Bye			
Shanghai Rolex Masters; Shanghai, China; ATP World Tour Masters 1000; Hardcourt, outdoor October 6–13, 2013	70 / 775	2R	(Ukraine) Alexandr Dolgopolov	34	Win	6–3, 6–2
Shanghai Rolex Masters; Shanghai, China; ATP World Tour Masters 1000; Hardcourt, outdoor October 6–13, 2013	71 / 776	3R	(Argentina) Carlos Berlocq	44	Win	6–1, 7–6^{(7–5)}
Shanghai Rolex Masters; Shanghai, China; ATP World Tour Masters 1000; Hardcourt, outdoor October 6–13, 2013	72 / 777	QF	(Switzerland) Stanislas Wawrinka	8	Win	7–6^{(12–10)}, 6–1
Shanghai Rolex Masters; Shanghai, China; ATP World Tour Masters 1000; Hardcourt, outdoor October 6–13, 2013	73 / 778	SF	(Argentina) Juan Martín del Potro	5	Loss	2–6, 4–6
BNP Paribas Masters; Paris, France; ATP World Tour Masters 1000; Hardcourt, indoor October 28 – November 3, 2013	–	1R	Bye			
BNP Paribas Masters; Paris, France; ATP World Tour Masters 1000; Hardcourt, indoor October 28 – November 3, 2013	74 / 779	2R	(Spain) Marcel Granollers	39	Win	7–5, 7–5
BNP Paribas Masters; Paris, France; ATP World Tour Masters 1000; Hardcourt, indoor October 28 – November 3, 2013	75 / 780	3R	(Poland) Jerzy Janowicz	14	Win	7–5, 6–4
BNP Paribas Masters; Paris, France; ATP World Tour Masters 1000; Hardcourt, indoor October 28 – November 3, 2013	76 / 781	QF	(France) Richard Gasquet	10	Win	6–4, 6–1
BNP Paribas Masters; Paris, France; ATP World Tour Masters 1000; Hardcourt, indoor October 28 – November 3, 2013	77 / 782	SF	(Spain) David Ferrer	3	Loss	3–6, 5–7
ATP World Tour Finals; London, United Kingdom; ATP World Tour Finals; Hardcourt, indoor November 4–11, 2013	78 / 783	RR	(Spain) David Ferrer	3	Win	6–3, 6–2
ATP World Tour Finals; London, United Kingdom; ATP World Tour Finals; Hardcourt, indoor November 4–11, 2013	79 / 784	RR	(Switzerland) Stanislas Wawrinka	8	Win	7–6^{(7–5)}, 7–6^{(8–6)}
ATP World Tour Finals; London, United Kingdom; ATP World Tour Finals; Hardcourt, indoor November 4–11, 2013	80 / 785	RR	(Czech Republic) Tomas Berdych	6	Win	6–4, 1–6, 6–3
ATP World Tour Finals; London, United Kingdom; ATP World Tour Finals; Hardcourt, indoor November 4–11, 2013	81 / 786	SF	(Switzerland) Roger Federer	7	Win	7–5, 6–3
ATP World Tour Finals; London, United Kingdom; ATP World Tour Finals; Hardcourt, indoor November 4–11, 2013	82 / 787	F	(Serbia) Novak Djokovic	2	Loss (4)	3–6, 4–6

=== Doubles matches ===
Tournament	Match	Round	Opponents	Ranks	Result	Score
Chile Open; Viña del Mar, Chile; ATP World Tour 250; Clay, outdoor 4–11 February 2013; Partner: (Argentina) Juan Mónaco	1 / 158	1R	(Czech Republic) František Čermák (Czech Republic) Lukáš Dlouhý	35; 57	Win	6–3, 6–2
Chile Open; Viña del Mar, Chile; ATP World Tour 250; Clay, outdoor 4–11 February 2013; Partner: (Argentina) Juan Mónaco	2 / 159	QF	(France) Guillaume Rufin (Italy) Filippo Volandri	899; 170	Win	6–2, 7–6 ^{(7–4)}
Chile Open; Viña del Mar, Chile; ATP World Tour 250; Clay, outdoor 4–11 February 2013; Partner: (Argentina) Juan Mónaco	3 / 160	SF	(Argentina) Carlos Berlocq (Argentina) Leonardo Mayer	112; 221	Win	6–3, 6–4
Chile Open; Viña del Mar, Chile; ATP World Tour 250; Clay, outdoor 4–11 February 2013; Partner: (Argentina) Juan Mónaco	4 / 161	F	(Italy) Paolo Lorenzi (Italy) Potito Starace	454; 84	Loss (1)	2–6, 4–6
Brasil Open; São Paulo, Brazil; ATP World Tour 250; Clay, indoor 11–17 February 2013; Partner: (Argentina) David Nalbandian	5 / 162	1R	(Spain) Pablo Andújar (Spain) Guillermo García-López	99; 294	Win	6–3, 3–6, [11–9]
Brasil Open; São Paulo, Brazil; ATP World Tour 250; Clay, indoor 11–17 February 2013; Partner: (Argentina) David Nalbandian	–	QF	(Austria) Oliver Marach (Argentina) Horacio Zeballos	52; 73	Withdrew	N/A
Rogers Cup; Montreal, Canada; ATP World Tour Masters 1000; Hardcourt, outdoor 5–11 August 2013; Partner: (Spain) Pablo Andujar	6 / 163	1R	(Spain) David Ferrer (Spain) Feliciano López	349; 146	Win	6–7^{(2–7)}, 6–1, [12–10]
Rogers Cup; Montreal, Canada; ATP World Tour Masters 1000; Hardcourt, outdoor 5–11 August 2013; Partner: (Spain) Pablo Andujar	–	2R	(Pakistan) Aisam-ul-Haq Qureshi (Netherlands) Jean-Julien Rojer	13; 14	Withdrew	N/A
Davis Cup World Group; Playoffs: Spain vs Ukraine; Madrid, Spain; Davis Cup; Clay, outdoor 13–15 September 2013; Partner: Marc López	7 / 164	RR3	(Ukraine) Denys Molchanov (Ukraine) Sergiy Stakhovsky	205; 163	Win	6–2, 6–7^{(6–8)}, 6–3, 6–4

== Tournament schedule ==
=== Singles schedule ===
Nadal's 2013 singles tournament schedule is as follows:

Date	Championship	Location	Category	Surface^{1}	Outcome 2012	Outcome 2013	Prev. Pts	New Pts^{2}
14.01.2013–27.01.2013	Australian Open	Australia	Grand Slam	Hard	F	Withdrew	1200	0
04.02.2013–10.02.2013	VTR Open	Chile	ATP World Tour 250	Clay	–	F	0	^{3} (150)
11.02.2013–17.02.2013	Brasil Open	Brazil	ATP World Tour 250	Clay (i)	–	W	0	250
25.02.2013–02.03.2013	Abierto Mexicano Telcel	Mexico	ATP World Tour 500	Clay	–	W	0	500
04.03.2013–18.03.2013	BNP Paribas Open	United States	ATP World Tour Masters 1000	Hard	SF	W	360	1000
18.03.2013–31.03.2013	Sony Open Tennis	United States	ATP World Tour Masters 1000	Hard	SF	Withdrew	360	0
13.04.2013–21.04.2013	Monte-Carlo Rolex Masters	France	ATP World Tour Masters 1000	Clay	W	F	1000	600
20.04.2013–28.04.2013	Barcelona Open BancSabadell	Spain	ATP World Tour 500	Clay	W	W	500	500
03.05.2013–12.05.2013	Mutua Madrileña Madrid Open	Spain	ATP World Tour Masters 1000	Clay	R16	W	90	1000
13.05.2013–20.05.2013	Internazionali BNL d'Italia	Italy	ATP World Tour Masters 1000	Clay	W	W	1000	1000
27.05.2013–09.06.2013	French Open	France	Grand Slam	Clay	W	W	2000	2000
08.06.2013–16.06.2013	Gerry Weber Open	Germany	ATP World Tour 250	Grass	QF	Withdrew	45	0
24.06.2013–07.07.2013	Wimbledon Championships	United Kingdom	Grand Slam	Grass	2R	1R	45	10
02.08.2013–11.08.2013	Rogers Cup	Canada	ATP World Tour Masters 1000	Hard	DNS	W	0	1000
10.08.2013–18.08.2013	Western & Southern Open	United States	ATP World Tour Masters 1000	Hard	DNS	W	0	1000
26.08.2013–09.09.2013	US Open	United States	Grand Slam	Hard	DNS	W	0	2000
30.09.2013–06.10.2013	China Open	China	ATP World Tour 500	Hard	DNS	F	0	300
06.10.2013–13.10.2013	Shanghai Masters	China	ATP World Tour Masters 1000	Hard	DNS	SF	0	360
21.10.2013–27.10.2013	Swiss Indoors	Switzerland	ATP World Tour 500	Hard (i)	–	Withdrew	0	0
28.10.2013–03.11.2013	BNP Paribas Masters	France	ATP World Tour Masters 1000	Hard (i)	DNS	SF	0	360
04.11.2013–11.11.2013	Barclays ATP World Tour Finals	United Kingdom	ATP World Tour Finals	Hard (i)	DNS	F	0	1000
Total							6600	13030 (13030)

^{1} The symbol (i) = indoors means that the respective tournament will be held indoors.

^{2} The ATP numbers between brackets = non-countable tournaments.

^{3} Since Rafael Nadal withdrew from the Swiss open in the final part of the season this tournament became countable and the points were eligible for rankings.

== Yearly records ==
=== Head-to-head matchups ===
Ordered by number of wins

- (Czech Republic) Tomáš Berdych 5–0
- (Spain) David Ferrer 5–1
- (Switzerland) Roger Federer 4–0
- (Switzerland) Stanislas Wawrinka 4–0
- (Germany) Philipp Kohlschreiber 3–0
- (Italy) Fabio Fognini 3–0
- (Argentina) Carlos Berlocq 3–0
- (Serbia) Novak Djokovic 3–3
- (France) Richard Gasquet 2–0
- (Spain) Nicolás Almagro 2–0
- (Canada) Milos Raonic 2–0
- (Poland) Jerzy Janowicz 2–0
- (Bulgaria) Grigor Dimitrov 2–0
- (Latvia) Ernests Gulbis 2–0
- (France) Benoît Paire 2–0
- (Australia) Marinko Matosevic 2–0
- (United States) Ryan Harrison 2–0
- (Argentina) Martín Alund 2–0
- (Argentina) David Nalbandian 1–0
- (Argentina) Juan Martín del Potro 1–1
- (France) Jo-Wilfried Tsonga 1–0
- (Spain) Tommy Robredo 1–0
- (Russia) Mikhail Youzhny 1–0
- (United States) John Isner 1–0
- (Japan) Kei Nishikori 1–0
- (Ukraine) Alexandr Dolgopolov 1–0
- (Spain) Marcel Granollers 1–0
- (France) Jérémy Chardy 1–0
- (Slovakia) Martin Kližan 1–0
- (Croatia) Ivan Dodig 1–0
- (Colombia) Santiago Giraldo 1–0
- (Ukraine) Sergiy Stakhovsky 1–0
- (Spain) Pablo Andújar 1–0
- (Germany) Benjamin Becker 1–0
- (Germany) Daniel Brands 1–0
- (Spain) Albert Ramos 1–0
- (Argentina) Federico Delbonis 1–0
- (Spain) Daniel Gimeno-Traver 1–0
- (Argentina) Leonardo Mayer 1–0
- (Brazil) João Souza 1–0
- (Brazil) Rogerio Dutra Silva 1–0
- (Canada) Jesse Levine 1–0
- (Argentina) Diego Schwartzman 1–0
- (Argentina) Horacio Zeballos 0–1
- (Belgium) Steve Darcis 0–1

=== Finals ===
==== Singles: 14 (10–4) ====
Category Grand Slam (2–0) ATP World Tour Finals (0–1) ATP World Tour Masters 1000 (5–1) ATP World Tour 500 (2–1) ATP World Tour 250 (1–1)	Titles by surface Hard (4–2) Clay (6–2) Grass (0–0)	Titles by conditions Outdoors (9–3) Indoors (1–1)

Outcome	No.	Date	Tournament	Surface	Opponent	Score
Runner-up	22.	10 February 2013	Chile Open, Viña del Mar, Chile	Clay	(Argentina) Horacio Zeballos	7–6^{(7–2)}, 6–7^{(6–8)}, 4–6
Winner	51.	17 February 2013	Brasil Open, São Paulo, Brazil (2)	Clay (i)	(Argentina) David Nalbandian	6–2, 6–3
Winner	52.	2 March 2013	Abierto Mexicano TELCEL, Acapulco, Mexico (2)	Clay	(Spain) David Ferrer	6–0, 6–2
Winner	53.	17 March 2013	BNP Paribas Open, Indian Wells, USA (3)	Hard	(Argentina) Juan Martín del Potro	4–6, 6–3, 6–4
Runner-up	23.	20 April 2013	Monte-Carlo Masters, Monte Carlo, Monaco	Clay	(Serbia) Novak Djokovic	2–6, 6–7^{(1–7)}
Winner	54.	28 April 2013	Barcelona Open, Barcelona, Spain (8)	Clay	(Spain) Nicolás Almagro	6–4, 6–3
Winner	55.	12 May 2013	Mutua Madrid Open, Madrid, Spain (3)	Clay	(Switzerland) Stanislas Wawrinka	6–2, 6–4
Winner	56.	19 May 2013	Internazionali BNL d'Italia, Rome, Italy (7)	Clay	(Switzerland) Roger Federer	6–1, 6–3
Winner	57.	9 June 2013	French Open, Paris, France (8)	Clay	(Spain) David Ferrer	6–3, 6–2, 6–3
Winner	58.	11 August 2013	Rogers Cup, Montreal, Canada (3)	Hard	(Canada) Milos Raonic	6–2, 6–2
Winner	59.	18 August 2013	Western & Southern Open, Cincinnati, USA	Hard	(United States) John Isner	7–6^{(10–8)}, 7–6^{(7–3)}
Winner	60.	9 September 2013	US Open, New York City, USA (2)	Hard	(Serbia) Novak Djokovic	6–2, 3–6, 6–4, 6–1
Runner-up	24.	6 October 2013	China Open, Beijing, China	Hard	(Serbia) Novak Djokovic	3–6, 4–6
Runner-up	25.	11 November 2013	ATP World Tour Finals, London, United Kingdom	Hard (i)	(Serbia) Novak Djokovic	3–6, 4–6

=== Exhibition matches ===
Rafael Nadal took part in the annual BNP Paribas Showdown, where he faced Juan Martín del Potro in a rematch of their 2009 US Open semi-final. Nadal was defeated in straight sets.

Outcome	No.	Date	Tournament	Surface	Opponent	Score
Lost	1.	March 4, 2013	BNP Paribas Showdown, Manhattan, New York	Hard	(Argentina) Juan Martín del Potro	6–7^{(4–7)}, 4–6
Winner	1.	November 17, 2013	Nadal vs Ferrer, Lima, Peru	Clay	(Spain) David Ferrer	7–5, 6–4
Lost	2.	November 20, 2013	Massu's retirement, Santiago, Chile	Hard	(Serbia) Novak Djokovic	6–7, 4–6
Lost	3.	November 21, 2013	Nalbandian's retirement, Cordoba, Argentina	Hard	(Argentina) David Nalbandian	4–6, 6–7
Winner	2.	November 23, 2013	Nalbandian's retirement, Buenos Aires, Argentina	Hard	(Argentina) David Nalbandian	6–3, 6–4
Winner	3.	November 24, 2013	Argentina exhibition, Buenos Aires, Argentina	Hard	(Serbia) Novak Djokovic	6–4, 7–5

=== Earnings ===
- **Bold** font denotes tournament win

#	Venue	Singles Prize Money	Year-to-date
1.	VTR Open	$39,000	$39,000
2.	**Brasil Open**	**$82,300**	**$121,300**
3.	**Abierto Mexicano Telcel**	**$291,800**	**$413,100**
4.	**BNP Paribas Open**	**$1,000,000**	**$1,413,100**
5.	Monte-Carlo Rolex Masters	€246,000	$1,731,989
6.	**Barcelona Open Banco Sabadell**	**€389,300**	**$2,236,638**
7.	**Mutua Madrid Open**	**€638,500**	**$3,064,325**
8.	**Internazionali BNL d'Italia**	**€501,700**	**$3,714,678**
9.	**French Open**	**€1,500,000**	**$5,659,128**
10.	Wimbledon Championships	£23,500	$5,695,517
11.	**Rogers Cup**	**$547,300**	**$6,242,817**
12.	**Western & Southern Open**	**$583,800**	**$6,826,617**
13.	**US Open**	**$3,600,000**	**$10,426,617**
14.	China Open	$251,165	$10,677,782
15.	Shanghai Rolex Masters	$180,075	$10,857,857
16.	BNP Paribas Masters	$128,850	$11,047,917
17.	ATP World Tour Finals	$1,013,000	$12,060,917
18.	2013 ATP Year-end Bonus Pool	$2,500,000	$14,560,917
As of November 11, 2013

== See also ==
- 2013 Roger Federer tennis season
- 2013 Novak Djokovic tennis season
- 2013 Andy Murray tennis season
- 2013 ATP World Tour
