= 2009 Abierto Internacional Varonil Casablanca Cancún – Singles =

Singles
- 2009 Abierto Internacional Varonil Casablanca Cancún

Final
- Champion: (Chile) Nicolás Massú
- Runner-up: (Slovenia) Grega Žemlja
- Score: 6–3, 7–5

Events
Singles	Doubles
← 2008 ·	Abierto Internacional Varonil Casablanca Cancún	· 2010 →

Grega Žemlja, who was the defending champion, reached the final, where he lost to Nicolás Massú 3–6, 5–7.

== Seeds ==
1. (Portugal) Rui Machado (quarterfinals)
2. (Slovenia) Blaž Kavčič (first round)
3. (Spain) Pere Riba (first round, retired)
4. (Chile) Nicolás Massú (champion)
5. (Slovenia) Grega Žemlja (final)
6. (Mexico) Santiago González (first round)
7. (Austria) Andreas Haider-Maurer (semifinals)
8. (Monaco) Benjamin Balleret (quarterfinals)

== Draw ==
=== Key ===
- Q = Qualifier
- WC = Wild card
- LL = Lucky loser
- Alt = Alternate
- SE = Special exempt
- PR = Protected ranking
- ITF = ITF entry
- JE = Junior exempt
- w/o = Walkover
- r = Retired
- d = Defaulted
- SR = Special ranking

=== Finals ===
Semifinals
7	(Austria) Andreas Haider-Maurer	6^{5}	3
4	(Chile) Nicolás Massú	7	6
(Spain) Adrián Menéndez-Maceiras	3	7	6^{5}
5	(Slovenia) Grega Žemlja	6	5	7

Final
4	(Chile) Nicolás Massú	6	7
5	(Slovenia) Grega Žemlja	3	5

=== Top half ===
First round
1	(Portugal) R Machado	6	6
LL	(Portugal) P Sousa	1	2
(Spain) G Olaso	3	6	1
Q	(United States) E Nunez	6	4	0^{r}
WC	(Mexico) T Hank	4	2
(Germany) L Pörschke	6	6
Q	(Switzerland) A Bossel	2	2
7	(Austria) A Haider-Maurer	6	6
4	(Chile) N Massú	4	6	6
Q	(United States) G Ouellette	6	1	4
(Spain) C Poch-Gradin	4	6	6
WC	(Mexico) D Garza	6	3	1
(Dominican Republic) V Estrella	6	7
(Portugal) L Tavares	1	6^{1}
(Mexico) M Gallardo-Valles	2	5
8	(Monaco) B Balleret	6	7

Second round
1	(Portugal) R Machado	7	6
(Spain) G Olaso	5	3
(Germany) L Pörschke	3	6	3
7	(Austria) A Haider-Maurer	6	3	6
4	(Chile) N Massú	6	6
(Spain) C Poch-Gradin	1	3
(Dominican Republic) V Estrella	6^{3}	6^{5}
8	(Monaco) B Balleret	7	7

Quarterfinals
1	(Portugal) R Machado	6	5	2
7	(Austria) A Haider-Maurer	1	7	6
4	(Chile) N Massú	6	3
8	(Monaco) B Balleret	2	0	r

Semifinals
7	(Austria) A Haider-Maurer	6^{5}	3
4	(Chile) N Massú	7	6

=== Bottom half ===
First round
6	(Mexico) S González	5	4
(Spain) A Menéndez-Maceiras	7	6
(Mexico) B Echagaray	6	6
Q	(France) P Frayssinoux	4	1
(Germany) M Sieber	3	3
(Latvia) D Pavlovs	6	0	r
WC	(United States) J Cox	4
3	(Spain) P Riba	1	r
5	(Slovenia) G Žemlja	2	6	6
(Spain) J Checa-Calvo	6	2	3
(Austria) R Eitzinger	2	7	6^{7}
(South Africa) R Klaasen	6	6^{3}	7
(Germany) A Begemann	4	3
WC	(Mexico) B Rodríguez	6	6
(Uruguay) M Felder	6	6
2	(Slovenia) B Kavčič	4	4

Second round
(Spain) A Menéndez-Maceiras	6	6
(Mexico) B Echagaray	2	4
(Germany) M Sieber	6	6
WC	(United States) J Cox	2	3
5	(Slovenia) G Žemlja	2	7	6
(South Africa) R Klaasen	6	5	3
WC	(Mexico) B Rodríguez	3	7	0
(Uruguay) M Felder	6	6^{4}	6

Quarterfinals
(Spain) A Menéndez-Maceiras	6	6
(Germany) M Sieber	2	4
5	(Slovenia) G Žemlja	6	6
(Uruguay) M Felder	4	1

Semifinals
(Spain) A Menéndez-Maceiras	3	7	6^{5}
5	(Slovenia) G Žemlja	6	5	7
