= 2010 Abierto Internacional Varonil Casablanca Cancún – Singles =

Singles
- 2010 Abierto Internacional Varonil Casablanca Cancún

Final
- Champion: (Spain) Pere Riba
- Runner-up: (Argentina) Carlos Berlocq
- Score: 6–4, 6–0

Events
Singles	Doubles
← 2009 ·	Abierto Internacional Varonil Casablanca Cancún	· 2011 →

Nicolás Massú was the defending champion but decided not to participate.
Pere Riba won the tournament after defeating Carlos Berlocq 6–4, 6–0 in the final.

== Seeds ==
1. (Argentina) Carlos Berlocq (final)
2. (Spain) Pere Riba (champion)
3. (Spain) Rubén Ramírez Hidalgo (semifinals)
4. (Argentina) Brian Dabul (quarterfinals)
5. (Argentina) Horacio Zeballos (quarterfinals)
6. (Slovenia) Grega Žemlja (first round)
7. (Argentina) ~~Máximo González~~ (withdrew)
8. (France) Éric Prodon (semifinals)

== Draw ==
=== Key ===
- Q = Qualifier
- WC = Wild card
- LL = Lucky loser
- Alt = Alternate
- SE = Special exempt
- PR = Protected ranking
- ITF = ITF entry
- JE = Junior exempt
- w/o = Walkover
- r = Retired
- d = Defaulted
- SR = Special ranking

=== Finals ===
Semifinals
1	(Argentina) Carlos Berlocq	6	6
8	(France) Éric Prodon	4	1
3	(Spain) Rubén Ramírez Hidalgo	4	7	1
2	(Spain) Pere Riba	6	6^{8}	6

Final
1	(Argentina) Carlos Berlocq	4	0
2	(Spain) Pere Riba	6	6

=== Top half ===
First round
1	(Argentina) C Berlocq	6	3	6
(Italy) G Naso	3	6	3
(Ecuador) JC Campozano	6	3	6
(Mexico) S González	2	6	3
(Italy) A Brizzi	3	2
(Argentina) D Junqueira	6	6
WC	(Australia) M Verryth	1	3
5	(Argentina) H Zeballos	6	6
4	(Argentina) B Dabul	6	6
(Argentina) S Decoud	3	3
ALT	(Ecuador) I Endara	6^{6}	6	4
(Serbia) N Ćirić	7	4	6
(France) A Gensse	6^{5}	6^{4}
Q	(France) A Michon	7	7
(Brazil) J Silva	3	3
8	(France) É Prodon	6	6

Second round
1	(Argentina) C Berlocq	6	6
(Ecuador) JC Campozano	1	0
(Argentina) D Junqueira	3	6^{3}
5	(Argentina) H Zeballos	6	7
4	(Argentina) B Dabul	4	6	7
(Serbia) N Ćirić	6	4	6^{5}
Q	(France) A Michon	2	2
8	(France) É Prodon	6	6

Quarterfinals
1	(Argentina) C Berlocq	7	6
5	(Argentina) H Zeballos	6^{4}	2
4	(Argentina) B Dabul	4	4
8	(France) É Prodon	6	6

Semifinals
1	(Argentina) C Berlocq	6	6
8	(France) É Prodon	4	1

=== Bottom half ===
First round
LL	(France) T Cazes-Carrère	6	3	4
(Italy) A Arnaboldi	1	6	6
WC	(United States) T Trombetta	6	7
(United States) K Kim	2	6^{5}
Q	(Brazil) L Kirche	6	6
Q	(Portugal) P Sousa	2	1
Q	(Monaco) B Balleret	1	6^{4}
3	(Spain) R Ramírez Hidalgo	6	7
6	(Slovenia) G Žemlja	4	6	3
(Argentina) F Bagnis	6	3	6
WC	(Mexico) D Garza	4	4
(United States) G Ouellette	6	6
WC	(Mexico) C Ramírez	6	5	6
(Montenegro) G Tošić	1	7	4
(Dominican Republic) V Estrella	1	0
2	(Spain) P Riba	6	6

Second round
(Italy) A Arnaboldi	6	6
WC	(United States) T Trombetta	3	3
Q	(Brazil) L Kirche	4	3
3	(Spain) R Ramírez Hidalgo	6	6
(Argentina) F Bagnis	6	7
(United States) G Ouellette	2	6^{4}
WC	(Mexico) C Ramírez	2	3
2	(Spain) P Riba	6	6

Quarterfinals
(Italy) A Arnaboldi	2	5
3	(Spain) R Ramírez Hidalgo	6	7
(Argentina) F Bagnis	4	5
2	(Spain) P Riba	6	7

Semifinals
3	(Spain) R Ramírez Hidalgo	4
2	(Spain) P Riba	6
