= 2011 Seguros Bolívar Open San José – Singles =

Singles
- 2011 Seguros Bolívar Open San José

Final
- Champion: (Ecuador) Giovanni Lapentti
- Runner-up: (Russia) Igor Kunitsyn
- Score: 7–5, 6–3

Events
Singles	Doubles
← 2010 ·	Seguros Bolívar Open San José	· 2012 →

Giovanni Lapentti won this tournament. He defeated Igor Kunitsyn 7–5, 6–3 in the final.

== Seeds ==
1. (Russia) Teymuraz Gabashvili (quarterfinals)
2. (United States) Robert Kendrick (quarterfinals)
3. (Israel) Dudi Sela (second round)
4. (Colombia) Alejandro Falla (first round)
5. (Russia) Igor Kunitsyn (final)
6. (Italy) Paolo Lorenzi (first round)
7. (Brazil) Rogério Dutra da Silva (first round)
8. (Croatia) Franko Škugor (semifinals)

== Draw ==
=== Key ===
- Q = Qualifier
- WC = Wild card
- LL = Lucky loser
- Alt = Alternate
- SE = Special exempt
- PR = Protected ranking
- ITF = ITF entry
- JE = Junior exempt
- w/o = Walkover
- r = Retired
- d = Defaulted
- SR = Special ranking

=== Finals ===
Semifinals
8	(Croatia) Franko Škugor	6^{4}	4
(Ecuador) Giovanni Lapentti	7	6
(Dominican Republic) Víctor Estrella	3	2
5	(Russia) Igor Kunitsyn	6	6

Final
(Ecuador) Giovanni Lapentti	7	6
5	(Russia) Igor Kunitsyn	5	3

=== Top half ===
First round
1	(Russia) T Gabashvili	6	6
WC	(United States) A Collarini	1	4
Q	(Colombia) Felipe Escobar	2	5
(South Africa) R Klaasen	6	7
(Chile) N Massú	6	6
(Mexico) L Díaz-Barriga	3	0
WC	(Colombia) JS Gómez	3	3
8	(Croatia) F Škugor	6	6
4	(Colombia) A Falla	6	1	4
(Ecuador) G Lapentti	2	6	6
(Colombia) C Salamanca	6	6
(United States) D Kudla	2	2
(Brazil) C Zampieri	6	6
(United States) J Witten	1	3
(Republic of Ireland) L Sorensen	6	6
7	(Brazil) R Dutra da Silva	4	4

Second round
1	(Russia) T Gabashvili	6	6
(South Africa) R Klaasen	2	4
(Chile) N Massú	3	3
8	(Croatia) F Škugor	6	6
(Ecuador) G Lapentti	6	6
(Colombia) C Salamanca	4	4
(Brazil) C Zampieri	6	4	3
(Republic of Ireland) L Sorensen	3	6	6

Quarterfinals
1	(Russia) T Gabashvili	4	4
8	(Croatia) F Škugor	6	6
(Ecuador) G Lapentti	6	6
(Republic of Ireland) L Sorensen	4	3

Semifinals
8	(Croatia) F Škugor	6^{4}	4
(Ecuador) G Lapentti	7	6

=== Bottom half ===
First round
6	(Italy) P Lorenzi	3	2
WC	(Colombia) E Struvay	6	6
(Dominican Republic) V Estrella	6	6
Q	(Mexico) Edgar López	2	2
Q	(Brazil) Rodrigo Grilli	3	2
(Colombia) JS Cabal	6	6
LL	(Costa Rica) Enrique Naranjo	0	1
3	(Israel) D Sela	6	6
5	(Russia) I Kunitsyn	6	6
Q	(Costa Rica) Esteban Vargas	1	0
WC	(Costa Rica) I Roca	1	3
(Argentina) Cristián Benedetti	6	6
(Colombia) R Farah	7	1	6
(Mexico) S González	6^{5}	6	4
(United States) A Halebian	4	1
2	(United States) R Kendrick	6	6

Second round
WC	(Colombia) E Struvay	7	2	4
(Dominican Republic) V Estrella	6^{4}	6	6
(Colombia) JS Cabal	6	3	7
3	(Israel) D Sela	4	6	6^{5}
5	(Russia) I Kunitsyn	6	6
(Argentina) Cristián Benedetti	0	2
(Colombia) R Farah	6^{3}	7	2
2	(United States) R Kendrick	7	5	6

Quarterfinals
(Dominican Republic) V Estrella	7	6
(Colombia) JS Cabal	5	2
5	(Russia) I Kunitsyn	2	6	6
2	(United States) R Kendrick	6	3	4

Semifinals
(Dominican Republic) V Estrella	3	2
5	(Russia) I Kunitsyn	6	6
