= 2011 Seguros Bolívar Open San José – Doubles =

Doubles
- 2011 Seguros Bolívar Open San José

Final
- Champions: (Colombia) Juan Sebastián Cabal (Colombia) Robert Farah
- Runners-up: (Mexico) Luis Díaz-Barriga (Mexico) Santiago González
- Score: 6–3, 6–3

Events
Singles	Doubles
← 2010 ·	Seguros Bolívar Open San José	· 2012 →

Juan Sebastián Cabal and Robert Farah won the final 6–3, 6–3, against Luis Díaz-Barriga and Santiago González.

== Seeds ==
The top three seeds received a bye into the quarterfinals.

1. (Colombia) Juan Sebastián Cabal / (Colombia) Robert Farah (champions)
2. (Mexico) Luis Díaz-Barriga / (Mexico) Santiago González (final)
3. (Brazil) Rogério Dutra da Silva / (Brazil) Caio Zampieri (quarterfinals)
4. (South Africa) Raven Klaasen / (Italy) Paolo Lorenzi (semifinals)

== Draw ==
=== Key ===
- Q = Qualifier
- WC = Wild card
- LL = Lucky loser
- Alt = Alternate
- SE = Special exempt
- PR = Protected ranking
- ITF = ITF entry
- JE = Junior exempt
- w/o = Walkover
- r = Retired
- d = Defaulted
- SR = Special ranking

=== Draw ===
First round
(United States) A Collarini (United States) D Kudla	6	6^{2}	[12]
(Colombia) Felipe Escobar (Mexico) Edgar López	2	7	[10]
WC	(Costa Rica) Enrique Naranjo (Costa Rica) Esteban Vargas	0	0
(Ecuador) G Lapentti (Chile) N Massú	6	6
(Argentina) Cristián Benedetti (Colombia) JS Gómez	1	3
(Colombia) A Falla (Colombia) E Struvay	6	6
WC	(United States) A Halebian (Costa Rica) I Roca	3	5
4	(South Africa) R Klaasen (Italy) P Lorenzi	6	7
(Brazil) Rodrigo Grilli (Croatia) F Škugor	6	6
(Dominican Republic) V Estrella (Colombia) C Salamanca	4	3

Quarterfinals
1	(Colombia) JS Cabal (Colombia) R Farah	6	6
(United States) A Collarini (United States) D Kudla	3	2
3	(Brazil) R Dutra da Silva (Brazil) C Zampieri	2	3
(Ecuador) G Lapentti (Chile) N Massú	6	6
(Colombia) A Falla (Colombia) E Struvay	3	3
4	(South Africa) R Klaasen (Italy) P Lorenzi	6	6
(Brazil) Rodrigo Grilli (Croatia) F Škugor	4	3
2	(Mexico) L Díaz-Barriga (Mexico) S González	6	6

Semifinals
1	(Colombia) JS Cabal (Colombia) R Farah	6	6
(Ecuador) G Lapentti (Chile) N Massú	4	2
4	(South Africa) R Klaasen (Italy) P Lorenzi	5	4
2	(Mexico) L Díaz-Barriga (Mexico) S González	7	6

Final
1	(Colombia) JS Cabal (Colombia) R Farah	6	6
2	(Mexico) L Díaz-Barriga (Mexico) S González	3	3
