= 2009 Abierto Internacional Varonil Casablanca Cancún =

- Date: 16–22 November
- Edition: 2nd
- Location: Cancún, Mexico

Champions

Singles
- (Chile) Nicolás Massú

Doubles
- (Germany) Andre Begemann / (Portugal) Leonardo Tavares
← 2008 ·	Abierto Internacional Varonil Casablanca Cancún	· 2010 →

The 2009 Abierto Internacional Varonil Casablanca Cancún was a professional tennis tournament played on outdoor red clay courts. It was the second edition of the tournament which was part of the 2009 ATP Challenger Tour. It took place in Cancún, Mexico between 16 and 22 November 2009.

== ATP entrants ==
=== Seeds ===
Country	Player	Rank^{1}	Seed
POR	Rui Machado	118	1
SLO	Blaž Kavčič	121	2
ESP	Pere Riba	127	3
CHI	Nicolás Massú	134	4
SLO	Grega Žemlja	154	5
MEX	Santiago González	166	6
AUT	Andreas Haider-Maurer	181	7
MON	Benjamin Balleret	214	8

- Rankings are as of November 9, 2009.

=== Other entrants ===
The following players received wildcards into the singles main draw:

- (United States) Jordan Cox
- (Mexico) Daniel Garza
- (Mexico) Tigre Hank
- (Mexico) Bruno Rodríguez

The following players received entry from the qualifying draw:

- (Switzerland) Adrien Bossel
- (France) Philippe Frayssinoux
- (United States) Eric Nunez
- (United States) Greg Ouellette
- (Portugal) Pedro Sousa (LL)

== Champions ==
=== Singles ===
(Chile) Nicolás Massú def. (Slovenia) Grega Žemlja, 6–3, 7–5

=== Doubles ===
(Germany) Andre Begemann / (Portugal) Leonardo Tavares def. (United States) Greg Ouellette / (Canada) Adil Shamasdin, 6–1, 6–7(6), [10–8]
