= 2013 Brasil Open – Doubles =

Doubles
- 2013 Brasil Open

Final
- Champions: (Austria) Alexander Peya (Brazil) Bruno Soares
- Runners-up: (Czech Republic) František Čermák (Slovakia) Michal Mertiňák
- Score: 6–7^{(5–7)}, 6–2, [10–7]

Details
- Draw: 16
- Seeds: 4

Events
Singles	Doubles
← 2012 ·	Brasil Open	· 2014 →

Eric Butorac and Bruno Soares were the defending champions but Butorac decided not to participate this year.
Soares played alongside Alexander Peya and successfully defended the title, defeating František Čermák and Michal Mertiňák in the final 6–7^{(5–7)}, 6–2, [10–7].

== Seeds ==
1. (Italy) Daniele Bracciali / (Brazil) Marcelo Melo (first round)
2. (Austria) Alexander Peya / (Brazil) Bruno Soares (champions)
3. (Czech Republic) František Čermák / (Slovakia) Michal Mertiňák (final)
4. (Czech Republic) Lukáš Dlouhý / (Brazil) André Sá (first round)

== Draw ==
=== Key ===
- Q = Qualifier
- WC = Wild card
- LL = Lucky loser
- Alt = Alternate
- ITF = ITF entry
- PR = Protected ranking
- SR = Special ranking
- SE = Special exempt
- JE = Junior exempt
- JR = Junior Accelerator Programme entrant
- CO = College Accelerator Programme entrant
- NG = Next Gen Accelerator Program entrant
- w/o = Walkover
- r = Retired
- d = Defaulted

=== Draw ===
First round
1	(Italy) D Bracciali (Brazil) M Melo	4	7	[7]
(Brazil) T Bellucci (Brazil) J Souza	6	5	[10]
(Italy) S Bolelli (Italy) F Fognini	7	6
(Germany) D Brown (Germany) C Kas	5	2
3	(Czech Republic) F Čermák (Slovakia) M Mertiňák	7	6^{3}	[16]
PR	(Argentina) L Arnold Ker (Argentina) J Mónaco	5	7^{7}	[14]
WC	(Brazil) M Demoliner (Brazil) P Zerbini	6	7
(Spain) D Gimeno-Traver (Spain) A Ramos	4	5
(Spain) R Nadal (Argentina) D Nalbandian	6	3	[11]
(Spain) P Andújar (Spain) G García-López	3	6	[9]
(Austria) O Marach (Argentina) H Zeballos	7	6
4	(Czech Republic) L Dlouhý (Brazil) A Sá	5	0
(Colombia) JS Cabal (Colombia) S Giraldo	3	6	[10]
WC	(Brazil) G Clezar (Portugal) G Elias	6	3	[8]
PR	(Spain) R Ramírez Hidalgo (Spain) T Robredo	4	3
2	(Austria) A Peya (Brazil) B Soares	6	6

Quarterfinals
(Brazil) T Bellucci (Brazil) J Souza	4	6^{4}
(Italy) S Bolelli (Italy) F Fognini	6	7^{7}
3	(Czech Republic) F Čermák (Slovakia) M Mertiňák	6	7^{7}
WC	(Brazil) M Demoliner (Brazil) P Zerbini	4	6^{5}
(Spain) R Nadal (Argentina) D Nalbandian
(Austria) O Marach (Argentina) H Zeballos	w/o
(Colombia) JS Cabal (Colombia) S Giraldo	4	2
2	(Austria) A Peya (Brazil) B Soares	6	6

Semifinals
(Italy) S Bolelli (Italy) F Fognini
3	(Czech Republic) F Čermák (Slovakia) M Mertiňák	w/o
(Austria) O Marach (Argentina) H Zeballos	6	6^{8}	[10]
2	(Austria) A Peya (Brazil) B Soares	3	7^{10}	[12]

Final
3	(Czech Republic) F Čermák (Slovakia) M Mertiňák	7^{7}	2	[7]
2	(Austria) A Peya (Brazil) B Soares	6^{5}	6	[10]
