= Seguros Bolívar Open =

Seguros Bolívar Open may refer to the following tennis tournaments:

- Seguros Bolívar Open Barranquilla
- Seguros Bolívar Open Bogotá
- Seguros Bolívar Open Bucaramanga
- Seguros Bolívar Open Cali
- Seguros Bolívar Open Medellín
- Seguros Bolívar Open Pereira
- Seguros Bolívar Open San José
