= 2009 Abierto Internacional Varonil Casablanca Cancún – Doubles =

Doubles
- 2009 Abierto Internacional Varonil Casablanca Cancún

Final
- Champions: (Germany) Andre Begemann (Portugal) Leonardo Tavares
- Runners-up: (United States) Greg Ouellette (Canada) Adil Shamasdin
- Score: 6–1, 6–7(6), [10–8]

Events
Singles	Doubles
← 2008 ·	Abierto Internacional Varonil Casablanca Cancún	· 2010 →

Łukasz Kubot and Oliver Marach were the defending champions, but they chose to not compete this year.
Andre Begemann and Leonardo Tavares won in the final 6–1, 6–7(6), [10–8], against Greg Ouellette and Adil Shamasdin.

== Seeds ==
1. (Mexico) Santiago González / (United States) Travis Rettenmaier (first round)
2. (Dominican Republic) ~~Víctor Estrella~~ / (United States) ~~Eric Nunez~~ (withdrew)
3. (South Africa) Raven Klaasen / (Brazil) Márcio Torres (first round)
4. (Spain) Guillermo Olaso / (Spain) Pere Riba (semifinals)

== Draw ==
=== Key ===
- Q = Qualifier
- WC = Wild card
- LL = Lucky loser
- Alt = Alternate
- SE = Special exempt
- PR = Protected ranking
- ITF = ITF entry
- JE = Junior exempt
- w/o = Walkover
- r = Retired
- d = Defaulted
- SR = Special ranking

=== Draw ===
First round
1	(Mexico) S González (United States) T Rettenmaier	4	2
(Spain) A Menéndez-Maceiras (Spain) C Poch-Gradin	6	6
(Mexico) V González (Mexico) T Hank	2	3
(Germany) A Begemann (Portugal) L Tavares	6	6
4	(Spain) G Olaso (Spain) P Riba	6	6
(Uruguay) M Felder (Chile) N Massú	3	4
WC	(Ecuador) G Lapentti (Mexico) M Pacheco	4	1
(Mexico) B Echagaray (Mexico) M Gallardo-Valles	6	6
(Slovenia) B Kavčič (Slovenia) G Žemlja	7	6
(Mexico) D Garza (Mexico) B Rodríguez	5	0
(Austria) R Eitzinger (Austria) A Haider-Maurer	6	7
3	(South Africa) R Klaasen (Brazil) M Torres	4	5
(United States) G Ouellette (Canada) A Shamasdin	6	6
WC	(Mexico) JC Villalobos (Germany) R Waite	1	4
(Portugal) R Machado (Portugal) P Sousa	6	6
ALT	(Greece) T Angelinos (Spain) J Checa-Calvo	3	3

Quarterfinals
(Spain) A Menéndez-Maceiras (Spain) C Poch-Gradin	3	6	[4]
(Germany) A Begemann (Portugal) L Tavares	6	4	[10]
4	(Spain) G Olaso (Spain) P Riba	6	4	[10]
(Mexico) B Echagaray (Mexico) M Gallardo-Valles	3	6	[6]
(Slovenia) B Kavčič (Slovenia) G Žemlja	3	4
(Austria) R Eitzinger (Austria) A Haider-Maurer	6	6
(United States) G Ouellette (Canada) A Shamasdin	6	6
(Portugal) R Machado (Portugal) P Sousa	3	2

Semifinals
(Germany) A Begemann (Portugal) L Tavares	6	6
4	(Spain) G Olaso (Spain) P Riba	3	3
(Austria) R Eitzinger (Austria) A Haider-Maurer	0	0
(United States) G Ouellette (Canada) A Shamasdin	6	6

Final
(Germany) A Begemann (Portugal) L Tavares	6	6^{6}	[10]
(United States) G Ouellette (Canada) A Shamasdin	1	7	[8]
