= 2011 Seguros Bolívar Open San José =

- Date: 14–20 March
- Edition: 1st
- Location: San José, Costa Rica

Champions

Singles
- (Ecuador) Giovanni Lapentti

Doubles
- (Colombia) Juan Sebastián Cabal / (Colombia) Robert Farah
Seguros Bolívar Open San José	· 2012 →

The 2011 Seguros Bolívar Open San José was a professional tennis tournament played on hard courts. It was the first edition of the tournament which is part of the 2011 ATP Challenger Tour. It took place in San José, Costa Rica between 14 and 20 March 2011.

== ATP entrants ==
=== Seeds ===
Country	Player	Rank^{1}	Seed
RUS	Teymuraz Gabashvili	77	1
USA	Robert Kendrick	86	2
ISR	Dudi Sela	87	3
COL	Alejandro Falla	101	4
RUS	Igor Kunitsyn	103	5
ITA	Paolo Lorenzi	127	6
BRA	Rogério Dutra da Silva	157	7
CRO	Franko Škugor	164	8

- Rankings are as of March 7, 2011.

=== Other entrants ===
The following players received wildcards into the singles main draw:

- (United States) Andrea Collarini
- (Colombia) Juan Sebastián Gómez
- (Costa Rica) Ignaci Roca
- (Colombia) Eduardo Struvay

The following players received entry from the qualifying draw:

- (Colombia) Felipe Escobar
- (Mexico) Edgar López
- (Brazil) Rodrigo Grilli
- (Costa Rica) Esteban Vargas

The following player received entry as a lucky loser:

- (Costa Rica) Enrique Naranjo

== Champions ==
=== Singles ===
(Ecuador) Giovanni Lapentti def. (Russia) Igor Kunitsyn, 7–5, 6–3

=== Doubles ===
(Colombia) Juan Sebastián Cabal / (Colombia) Robert Farah def. (Mexico) Luis Díaz Barriga / (Mexico) Santiago González, 6–3, 6–3
