= 2010 Abierto Internacional Varonil Casablanca Cancún =

- Date: 15–21 November
- Edition: 3rd
- Location: Cancún, Mexico

Champions

Singles
- (Spain) Pere Riba

Doubles
- (Dominican Republic) Víctor Estrella / (Mexico) Santiago González
← 2009 ·	Abierto Internacional Varonil Casablanca Cancún	· 2011 →

The 2010 Abierto Internacional Varonil Casablanca Cancún was a professional tennis tournament played on clay courts. It was the third edition of the tournament which is part of the 2010 ATP Challenger Tour. It took place in Cancún, Mexico between 15 and 21 November 2010.

== ATP entrants ==
=== Seeds ===
Country	Player	Rank^{1}	Seed
ARG	Carlos Berlocq	75	1
ESP	Pere Riba	79	2
ESP	Rubén Ramírez Hidalgo	80	3
ARG	Brian Dabul	83	4
ARG	Horacio Zeballos	108	5
SVN	Grega Žemlja	122	6
ARG	Máximo González	155	7
FRA	Éric Prodon	160	8

- Rankings are as of November 8, 2010.

=== Other entrants ===
The following players received wildcards into the singles main draw:

- (Mexico) Daniel Garza
- (Mexico) César Ramírez
- (United States) Ty Trombetta
- (Australia) Mark Verryth

The following players received entry as an alternate into the singles main draw:

- (Ecuador) Iván Endara

The following players received entry from the qualifying draw:

- (Monaco) Benjamin Balleret
- (France) Thomas Cazes-Carrère (LL)
- (Brazil) Leonardo Kirche
- (France) Axel Michon
- (Portugal) Pedro Sousa

== Champions ==
=== Singles ===
(Spain) Pere Riba def. (Argentina) Carlos Berlocq, 6–4, 6–0

=== Doubles ===
(Dominican Republic) Víctor Estrella / (Mexico) Santiago González def. (Austria) Rainer Eitzinger / (Mexico) César Ramírez, 6–1, 7–6(3)
