= 2013 Brasil Open – Singles =

Singles
- 2013 Brasil Open

Final
- Champion: (Spain) Rafael Nadal
- Runner-up: (Argentina) David Nalbandian
- Score: 6–2, 6–3

Details
- Draw: 28
- Seeds: 8

Events
Singles	Doubles
- Brasil Open

Rafael Nadal defeated David Nalbandian in the final, 6–2, 6–3 to win the singles tennis title at the 2013 Brasil Open.

Nicolás Almagro was the two-time defending champion, but lost in the quarterfinals to Nalbandian.

== Seeds ==
1. (Spain) Rafael Nadal (champion)
2. (Spain) Nicolás Almagro (quarterfinals)
3. (Argentina) Juan Mónaco (second round)
4. (France) Jérémy Chardy (second round)
5. (Brazil) Thomaz Bellucci (second round)
6. (Italy) Fabio Fognini (first round)
7. (Spain) Pablo Andújar (second round)
8. (Spain) Albert Ramos (second round)

== Draw ==
Key

- Q = Qualifier
- WC = Wild card
- LL = Lucky loser
- Alt = Alternate
- ITF = ITF entry
- PR = Protected ranking
- SR = Special ranking
- SE = Special exempt
- JE = Junior exempt
- JR = Junior Accelerator Programme entrant
- CO = College Accelerator Programme entrant
- NG = Next Gen Accelerator Program entrant
- w/o = Walkover
- r = Retired
- d = Defaulted

=== Finals ===
Semifinals
1/WC	(Spain) Rafael Nadal	6	6^{2}	6
LL	(Argentina) Martín Alund	3	7^{7}	1
(Italy) Simone Bolelli	3	5
(Argentina) David Nalbandian	6	7

Final
1/WC	(Spain) Rafael Nadal	6	6
(Argentina) David Nalbandian	2	3

=== Top half ===
First round
(Spain) R Ramírez Hidalgo	6^{6}	0^{r}
Q	(Brazil) J Souza	7^{8}	0
(Russia) A Kuznetsov	3	4
(Argentina) C Berlocq	6	6
(Spain) G García López	3	5
8	(Spain) A Ramos	6	7
WC	(Brazil) R Mello	4	4
LL	(Argentina) M Alund	6	6
(Spain) D Gimeno Traver	3	6	6^{6}
(Italy) F Volandri	6	3	7^{8}
Q	(Brazil) G Clezar	6^{4}	7	6^{1}
5	(Brazil) T Bellucci	7^{7}	5	7^{7}

Second round
1/WC	(Spain) R Nadal	6	6
Q	(Brazil) J Souza	3	4
(Argentina) C Berlocq	7^{9}	6
8	(Spain) A Ramos	6^{7}	4
4	(France) J Chardy	4	6	6^{5}
LL	(Argentina) M Alund	6	4	7^{7}
(Italy) F Volandri	6	6
5	(Brazil) T Bellucci	3	2

Quarterfinals
1/WC	(Spain) R Nadal	3	6	6
(Argentina) C Berlocq	6	4	4
LL	(Argentina) M Alund	7	7^{7}
(Italy) F Volandri	5	6^{5}

Semifinals
1/WC	(Spain) R Nadal	6	6^{2}	6
LL	(Argentina) M Alund	3	7^{7}	1

=== Bottom half ===
First round
7	(Spain) P Andújar	6	7^{7}
(Colombia) S Giraldo	4	6^{5}
(Italy) P Lorenzi	4	4
(Spain) A Montañés	6	6
WC	(Spain) T Robredo	2	4
(Italy) S Bolelli	6	6
6	(Italy) F Fognini	6^{6}	6	1
(Argentina) G Pella	7^{8}	1	6
(Argentina) D Nalbandian	7	5	6
Q	(Chile) J Aguilar	5	7	3
(Argentina) H Zeballos	7^{7}	0	0^{r}
Q	(Chile) P Capdeville	6^{5}	6	3

Second round
7	(Spain) P Andújar	5	2
(Spain) A Montañés	7	6
(Italy) S Bolelli	7	6
3	(Argentina) J Mónaco	5	2
(Argentina) G Pella	4	2
(Argentina) D Nalbandian	6	6
Q	(Chile) P Capdeville	4	7^{7}	2
2	(Spain) N Almagro	6	6^{3}	6

Quarterfinals
(Spain) A Montañés	4	4
(Italy) S Bolelli	6	6
(Argentina) D Nalbandian	7^{7}	3	7^{7}
2	(Spain) N Almagro	6^{5}	6	6^{3}

Semifinals
(Italy) S Bolelli	3	5
(Argentina) D Nalbandian	6	7

== Qualifying ==
=== Seeds ===
1. (Portugal) João Sousa (first round)
2. (Argentina) Martín Alund (qualifying competition, lucky loser)
3. (Brazil) Rogério Dutra da Silva (second round)
4. (Argentina) Federico Delbonis (first round)
5. (Portugal) Gastão Elias (second round)
6. (Brazil) Thiago Alves (second round)
7. (Brazil) João Souza (qualified)
8. (Chile) Paul Capdeville (qualified)

=== Qualifiers ===
1. (Brazil) Guilherme Clezar
2. (Chile) Jorge Aguilar
3. (Brazil) João Souza
4. (Chile) Paul Capdeville

=== Lucky loser ===
1. (Argentina) Martín Alund

=== Draw ===
==== First qualifier ====
First round
1	(Portugal) João Sousa	6	6^{3}	2
(Colombia) Alejandro González	4	7^{7}	6
(Brazil) Augusto Laranja	3	4
(Brazil) Guilherme Clezar	6	6
(Ecuador) Julio César Campozano	7	3	6
(Serbia) Dušan Lajović	5	6	4
WC	(Brazil) Bruno Sant'Anna	1	2
5	(Portugal) Gastão Elias	6	6

Second round
(Colombia) Alejandro González	4	7	4
(Brazil) Guilherme Clezar	6	5	6
(Ecuador) Julio César Campozano	6	7^{8}
5	(Portugal) Gastão Elias	2	6^{6}

Qualifying competition
(Brazil) Guilherme Clezar	6	6
(Ecuador) Julio César Campozano	3	4

==== Second qualifier ====
First round
2	(Argentina) Martín Alund	7^{7}	4	6
(Argentina) Facundo Bagnis	6^{5}	6	2
(Argentina) Marco Trungelliti	6	6
(Spain) Sergio Gutiérrez Ferrol	3	1
(Chile) Jorge Aguilar	6	6
(Brazil) Ricardo Hocevar	4	3
WC	(Brazil) Thiago Monteiro	6^{4}	2
6	(Brazil) Thiago Alves	7^{7}	6

Second round
2	(Argentina) Martín Alund	6	6
(Argentina) Marco Trungelliti	2	1
(Chile) Jorge Aguilar	6	6^{2}	6
6	(Brazil) Thiago Alves	2	7^{7}	4

Qualifying competition
2	(Argentina) Martín Alund	6	6^{6}	6^{5}
(Chile) Jorge Aguilar	3	7^{8}	7^{7}

==== Third qualifier ====
First round
3	(Brazil) Rogério Dutra da Silva	6	6
(Argentina) Agustín Velotti	4	3
(Spain) Javier Martí	7^{7}	7
(Portugal) Frederico Gil	6^{5}	5
(Italy) Gianluca Naso	4	6	6
(Argentina) Facundo Argüello	6	3	4
(Germany) Dustin Brown	6^{1}	3
7	(Brazil) João Souza	7^{7}	6

Second round
3	(Brazil) Rogério Dutra da Silva	5	6^{6}
(Spain) Javier Martí	7	7^{8}
(Italy) Gianluca Naso	6^{5}	6	3
7	(Brazil) João Souza	7^{7}	3	6

Qualifying competition
(Spain) Javier Martí	4	4
7	(Brazil) João Souza	6	6

==== Fourth qualifier ====
First round
4	(Argentina) Federico Delbonis	6	3	3
(Russia) Teymuraz Gabashvili	2	6	6
WC	(Brazil) Pedro Zerbini	7^{9}	4	4
PR	(Germany) Julian Reister	6^{7}	6	6
(Argentina) Guido Andreozzi	7	6
WC	(Brazil) Fabiano de Paula	5	2
(Canada) Steven Diez	3	2
8	(Chile) Paul Capdeville	6	6

Second round
(Russia) Teymuraz Gabashvili	4	3
PR	(Germany) Julian Reister	6	6
(Argentina) Guido Andreozzi	3	6	2
8	(Chile) Paul Capdeville	6	1	6

Qualifying competition
PR	(Germany) Julian Reister	1	3
8	(Chile) Paul Capdeville	6	6
