= 2013 Brasil Open =

- Date: February 11–17
- Edition: 13th
- Category: ATP World Tour 250
- Draw: 32S / 16D
- Prize money: $519,775
- Surface: Clay - indoor
- Location: São Paulo, Brazil

Champions

Singles
- (Spain) Rafael Nadal

Doubles
- (Austria) Alexander Peya / (Brazil) Bruno Soares
- Brasil Open

The 2013 Brasil Open was a men's tennis tournament played on indoor clay courts. It was the 13th edition of the event known as the Brasil Open, and is part of the ATP World Tour 250 series of the 2013 ATP World Tour. It took place from February 11 through February 17, 2013, in São Paulo, Brazil.

== Finals ==
=== Singles ===
- (Spain) Rafael Nadal defeated (Argentina) David Nalbandian, 6–2, 6–3

=== Doubles ===
- (Austria) Alexander Peya / (Brazil) Bruno Soares defeated (Czech Republic) František Čermák / (Slovakia) Michal Mertiňák, 6–7^{(5–7)}, 6–2, [10–7]

== Singles main draw entrants ==
=== Seeds ===
Country	Player	Ranking^{1}	Seed
ESP	Rafael Nadal	5	1
ESP	Nicolás Almagro	11	2
ARG	Juan Mónaco	15	3
FRA	Jérémy Chardy	26	4
BRA	Thomaz Bellucci	35	5
ITA	Fabio Fognini	42	6
ESP	Pablo Andújar	45	7
ESP	Albert Ramos	50	8

- ^{1} Rankings as of February 4, 2013.

=== Other entrants ===
The following players received wildcards into the main draw:

- (Brazil) Ricardo Mello
- (Spain) Rafael Nadal
- (Spain) Tommy Robredo

The following players received entry from the qualifying draw:

- (Chile) Jorge Aguilar
- (Chile) Paul Capdeville
- (Brazil) Guilherme Clezar
- (Brazil) João Souza

The following player received entry as lucky loser:

- (Argentina) Martín Alund

=== Withdrawals ===
Before the tournament

- (Slovenia) Aljaž Bedene
- (Argentina) Leonardo Mayer (back injury)
- (Switzerland) Stanislas Wawrinka

=== Retirements ===
- (Spain) Rubén Ramírez Hidalgo (right ankle sprain)
- (Argentina) Horacio Zeballos (general fatigue)

== Doubles main draw entrants ==
=== Seeds ===
Country	Player	Country	Player	Rank^{1}	Seed
ITA	Daniele Bracciali	BRA	Marcelo Melo	40	1
AUT	Alexander Peya	BRA	Bruno Soares	42	2
CZE	František Čermák	SVK	Michal Mertiňák	79	3
CZE	Lukáš Dlouhý	BRA	André Sá	118	4

- ^{1} Rankings are as of February 4, 2013.

=== Other entrants ===
The following pairs received wildcards into the main draw:

- (Brazil) Guilherme Clezar / (Portugal) Gastão Elias
- (Brazil) Marcelo Demoliner / (Brazil) Pedro Zerbini

=== Withdrawals ===
During the tournament

- (Italy) Fabio Fognini (left leg injury)
- (Spain) Rafael Nadal (knee overuse)
