= Marvin Barker =

American baseball player (1912–1964)

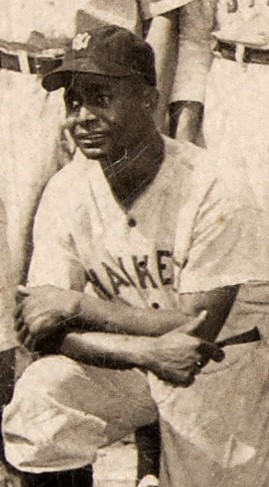
- Outfielder
- Born: February 13, 1912; Joplin, Missouri, U.S.
- Died: July 1964 (aged 52); Newark, New Jersey, U.S.
- Batted: Right Threw: Right

Negro leagues debut
- 1935, for the Newark Dodgers

Last Negro leagues appearance
- 1948, for the New York Black Yankees

Negro leagues statistics
- Batting average: .255
- Home runs: 14
- Runs batted in: 151
- Managerial record: 52–147–5
- Winning percentage: .261
- Stats at Baseball Reference
- Managerial record at Baseball Reference

Teams
- As player: Newark Dodgers (1935); New York Black Yankees (1936–1941); Newark Eagles (1941); Philadelphia Stars (1942); New York Black Yankees (1943–1948); As manager: New York Black Yankees (1945–1948)

Marvin Vincent Barker (February 13, 1912 – July 1964), nicknamed Hack, was an American Negro league baseball outfielder and manager.

A native of Joplin, Missouri, Barker made his Negro leagues debut in 1935 with the Newark Dodgers. He spent 12 seasons with the New York Black Yankees, and was selected to play in the annual East–West All-Star Game in 1940, 1945, and 1948. From 1945 to 1948, Barker served as New York's player-manager.
