= Greg Ouellette =

American tennis player (born 1986)

- Country (sports): United States
- Residence: Boise, ID, U.S.
- Born: May 19, 1986 (age 40) Titusville, FL, U.S.
- Height: 5 ft 10 in (1.78 m)
- Turned pro: 2008
- Retired: 2014
- Plays: Left-handed (two-handed backhand)
- College: University of Florida
- Prize money: US$ 107,125

Singles
- Career titles: 0
- Highest ranking: No. 269 (August 12, 2011)

Grand Slam singles results
- US Open: Q2 (2011)

Doubles
- Career titles: 0
- Highest ranking: No. 360 (November 23, 2009)

Greg Ouellette
Medal record

Representing United States

Men's Tennis

Pan American Games
Bronze medal – third place	2011 Guadalajara	Doubles

Greg Ouellette (born 19 May 1986) is an American Professional tennis player. Ouellette reached a career high singles ranking of 269 on August 12, 2011 winning 5 professional singles titles and 7 doubles titles. This ranking high came shortly after his only ATP Challenger Semi-Final, in Lexington (d. Wayne Odesnik 0-6 0-6). He was named the International Tennis Federation (ITF) Player of the Month in October 2010.

Ouellette won a Bronze Medal at the 2011 Pan American Games held in Guadalajara, Mexico.

During his collegiate career at the University of Florida, Ouellette advanced to the quarterfinals of the 2005 NCAA singles tournament in his freshman season. His record was 11-0 at the #2 position in SEC matches and was named the 2005 SEC Freshman of the Year and the Southeast Region Rookie of the Year.

In the 2008 NCAA singles tournament, Ouellette appeared as the number 2 seed. He was honored as the 2008 SEC Player of the Year and completed his collegiate career as a five time All-American which marks as the most honors in Gator Men's Tennis history.

He is currently coaching for the Boise State Bronco Men's Tennis team.

== ATP Challenger and ITF Futures finals ==
=== Singles: 5 (5-3) ===
Legend ATP Challengers (0-0) ITF Futures (5-3)	Titles by surface Hard (3–3) Grass (0–0) Clay (2-0) Carpet (0–0)

Outcome	No.	Date	Tournament	Surface	Opponent	Score
Winner	1.	31, August 2009	Almere, Netherlands	Clay	(Finland) Harri Heliovaara	6-2, 3-6, 6-4
Runner-up	2.	30, March 2010	Mobile, Alabama, USA	Hard	(Slovakia) Ivo Klec	1-6, 4-6
Runner-up	3.	22 June 2010	Chico, California, USA	Hard	(South Korea) Daniel Yoo	6–2, 4-6, 6-7^{(3-7)}
Winner	4.	13 July 2010	Peoria, Illinois, U.S.A.	Clay	(South Korea) Daniel Yoo	7-5, 1-6, 6-3
Winner	5.	11 October 2010	Caracas, Venezuela	Hard	(Ecuador) Ivan Endara	6-3, 6-1
Runner-up	6.	18 October 2010	Caracas, Venezuela	Hard	(Colombia) Alejandro Gonzalez	1-6, 6-7^{(3-7)}
Winner	7.	25 October 2010	Higuerote, Venezuela	Hard	(Guatemala) Christopher Diaz-Figueroa	6-3, 6-2
Runner-up	8.	20 March 2012	California, USA	Hard	(United States) Brian Baker	1-6,2-6
winner	9.	10 April 2012	Oklahoma, USA	Hard	(Brazil) Pedro Zerbini	6-2, 6-1

=== Doubles: 7 (7-9) ===
Legend ATP Challengers (0-1) ITF Futures (7-8)	Titles by surface Hard (5-2) Grass (0–0) Clay (2-6) Carpet (0–0)

Outcome	No.	Date	Tournament	Surface	Partner	Opponents	Score
Runner-up	1.	22 November 2009	Cancún, Mexico	Clay	(Canada) Adil Shamasdin	(Germany) Andre Begemann (Portugal) Leonardo Tavares	1-6, 7–6^{(8-6)}, 8-10
Runner-up	2.	26 June 2007	Rochester, New York, USA	Clay	(United States) Chris Lam	(United States) Cory Parr (United States) Todd Paul	4-6, 1-6
Runner-up	3.	17 June 2008	California, USA	Hard	(United States) Scott Oudsema	(New Zealand) Daniel King-Turner (New Zealand) G.D. Jones	2-6, 6-4, 5-10
Runners-up	4.	2 February 2009	Naucalpan, Mexico	Hard	(United States) Treat Huey	(Mexico) Luis Diaz-Barriga (Mexico) Antonio Ruiz-Rosales	3-6, 2-6
Winner	5.	28 April 2009	Florida, United States	Clay	(United States) Treat Huey	(Italy) Andrea Falgheri (Italy) Stefano Ianni	6-2,6-2
Runner-up	6.	6 May 2009	Orange Park, Florida, USA	Clay	(Canada) Philip Bester	(United States) Marcus Fugate (United States) Todd Paul	4-6, 1-6
Runner-up	7.	14 September 2009	Portugal, USA	Clay	(United Kingdom) Daniel Smethurst	(Spain) Carlos Calderon-Rodriguez (Spain) Pedro Clar-Rossello	6-7^{(5-7)}, 3-6
Runner-up	8.	6 July 2010	Pennsylvania, USA	Clay	(Canada) Vasek Pospisil	(United States) Tennys Sandgren (United States) Rhyne Williams	6-3, 3-6, 9-11
Winner	9.	26 June 2007	Caracas, Venezuela	Hard	(United States) Maciek Sykut	(Spain) Ramon Gonzalez (Brazil) Alexandre Schnitman	6-2, 6-4
Runner-up	10.	1 February 2011	Florida, USA	Clay	(United States) Blake Strode	(Bulgaria) Dimitar Kutrovsky (United States) Jack Sock	3-6, 6-3, 8-10
Winner	11.	22 February 2011	Brownsville, Texas, USA	Hard	(United States) Devin Britton	(Bulgaria) Boris Nikola Bakalov (Georgia (country)) Nikoloz Basilashvili	6-1, 6-3
Winner	12.	3 May 2011	Orange Park, Florida, USA	Clay	(United States) Devin Britton	(Austria) Gerald Melzer (United States) Ty Trombetta	6-2, 6-4
Winner	13.	17 April 2012	Arkansas, USA	Hard	(United States) Tennys Sandgren	(New Zealand) Marvin Barker (United Kingdom) Edward Corrie	4-6, 7-6^{(10-8)}, 10-8
Winner	14.	2 July 2012	Kelowna, Canada	Hard	(Canada) Erik Chvojka	(Canada) Philip Bester (Canada) Kamil Pajkowski	6-7^{(8-10)}, 6-4, 10-8
Runner-up	15.	9 July 2012	Saskatoon, CAN	Hard	(Canada) Erik Chvojka	(United States) Nicolas Meister (Brazil) Pedro Zerbini	6-3, 4-6, 10-12
winner	16.	23 September 2014	Irvine, California, USA	Hard	(Australia) Greg Jones	(Australia) Carsten Ball (United States) Junior Alexandre Ore	6-2, 4-6, 10-5

== See also ==
- Florida Gators
- List of Florida Gators tennis players

=== Awards ===
International Tennis Federation (ITF) 2010 ITF Player of the Month
Southeastern Conference (SEC) Freshman of the Year
Southeastern Conference 2005, 2006, 2007, 2008 men's tennis All-SEC first team
Southeastern Conference 2008 SEC Player of the Year
Intercollegiate Tennis Association (ITA) 2008 Jon Van Nostrand Award
