= Martín Alund =

Argentine tennis player

- Alund after winning the Liverpool International in 2013.
- Country (sports): Argentina
- Residence: Mendoza, Argentina
- Born: 26 December 1985 (age 39); Mendoza, Argentina
- Height: 1.83 m (6 ft 0 in)
- Turned pro: 2004
- Retired: January 2017
- Plays: Right-handed (one-handed backhand)
- Coach: Fabián Blengino
- Prize money: US$456,298

Singles
- Career record: 7–10
- Career titles: 0
- Highest ranking: No. 84 (18 March 2013)

Grand Slam singles results
- Australian Open: Q1 (2013)
- French Open: 1R (2013)
- Wimbledon: 1R (2013)
- US Open: Q2 (2014)

Doubles
- Career record: 1–2
- Career titles: 0
- Highest ranking: No. 103 (19 November 2012)
- Last updated on: 19 August 2014.

Martín Alund (Spanish pronunciation: [maɾˈtin aˈlun]; Swedish: Ålund; born 26 December 1985) is a retired Argentine professional tennis player. He reached the semifinals of the 2013 Brasil Open; has won seven ATP Challenger events in doubles; and achieved a career-high singles ranking of World No. 84 in March 2013.

== Tennis career ==
=== Juniors ===
As a junior, Alund reached as high as No. 45 in the world singles rankings in March 2003 (and No. 62 in doubles the same year). He gained victories over promising junior prospects such as Eduardo Schwank, Alex Kuznetsov and Scoville Jenkins.

=== Pro tour ===
==== 2013 ====
As a lucky loser, Alund reached the semifinals of the 2013 Brasil Open, defeating World No. 25 Jérémy Chardy (fresh off of his career-best Australian Open quarterfinal run) and experienced claycourter Filippo Volandri en route. In the semis he valiantly took a set off top seed Rafael Nadal before losing in 3 sets.

In Houston a few weeks later, Alund defeated former World No. 1 and multiple grand slam champion Lleyton Hewitt.

Alund gained direct entry into both the French Open and Wimbledon, winning a set against World No. 4 David Ferrer in the first round of the latter before eventually losing in four sets. In preparation for the grass courts, he won the Liverpool International exhibition tournament, etching his name alongside esteemed former champions Marat Safin, Ivan Ljubičić and Fernando González.

Together with João Souza, Alund reached the quarterfinals of the men's doubles at Båstad.

==== 2014-2017: Retirement ====
After qualifying for both Viña del Mar and Buenos Aires, Alund defeated clay specialist Albert Ramos in straights and took a set off both World No. 18 Nicolas Almagro and No. 46 Robin Haase.

After a year and a half of injuries, Alund announced he had decided to retire from the pro tour in January 2017.

== Coaching ==
After his retirement, he initially lent his world class skills to the coaching team at Advantage Tennis in New Jersey.

Alund is now head of pros at the IMG Academy in Bradenton, Florida and is currently coaching former junior World No. 1 "Jerry" Shang, guiding him to the ATP top 100 and his first ATP Tour title in Chengdu.

== Playing style ==
Alund is a natural claycourter, though intersperses his defensive skills with clean hitting, a powerful first serve and deft dropshots. He possesses a heavy, hard-hitting forehand and a flashy one-handed backhand, both of which are capable of reeling off winners, but are also often error-prone.

== Career finals ==
=== Challenger singles: 3 (0–3) ===
Legend
ATP Challenger Series

Result	No.	Date	Tournament	Surface	Opponent	Score
Runner-up	1.	24 November 2008	Cancún, Mexico	Clay	(Slovenia) Grega Žemlja	2–6, 1–6
Runner-up	2.	1 July 2012	Milan, Italy	Clay	(Spain) Tommy Robredo	3–6, 0–6
Runner-up	3.	14 October 2012	San Juan, Argentina	Clay	(Netherlands) Thiemo de Bakker	2–6, 6–3, 2–6
