= Seguros Bolívar Open San José =

Defunct tennis tournament
- Location: San José, Costa Rica
- Category: ATP Challenger Tour
- Surface: Hard
- Draw: 32S/32Q/16D
- Prize money: €50,000+H

The Seguros Bolívar Open San José was a tennis tournament held in San José, Costa Rica in 2011. The event was part of the ATP Challenger Tour and was played on hardcourts.

== Past finals ==
=== Singles ===
Year	Champion	Runner-up	Score
2011	(Ecuador) Giovanni Lapentti	(Russia) Igor Kunitsyn	7–5, 6–3

=== Doubles ===
Year	Champions	Runners-up	Score
2011	(Colombia) Juan Sebastián Cabal (Colombia) Robert Farah	(Mexico) Luis Díaz-Barriga (Mexico) Santiago González	6–3, 6–3
