= Pedro Zerbini =

Brazilian tennis player

- Country (sports): Brazil
- Born: 9 December 1988 (age 36)
- Prize money: $14,183

Singles
- Career record: 0–0 (at ATP Tour level, Grand Slam level, and in Davis Cup)
- Career titles: 1 ITF
- Highest ranking: No. 463 (25 February 2013)

Doubles
- Career record: 1–1 (at ATP Tour level, Grand Slam level, and in Davis Cup)
- Career titles: 1 ITF
- Highest ranking: No. 409 (4 March 2013)

Pedro Zerbini (born December 9, 1988) is a former Brazilian tennis player born in São Paulo, Brazil.

== Career ==
Zerbini has a career high ATP singles ranking of 463 achieved on 25 February 2013. He also has a career high ATP doubles ranking of 409 achieved on 4 March 2013.

Zerbini made his ATP main draw debut at the 2013 Brasil Open after receiving a wildcard for the doubles main draw.
