= Luis Díaz Barriga =

Mexican tennis player

- Country (sports): Mexico
- Born: 9 April 1986 (age 40)
- Height: 1.85 m (6 ft 1 in)
- Turned pro: 2003
- Plays: Right-handed (two-handed forehand)
- Prize money: $44,269

Singles
- Career record: 0–1
- Career titles: 0; 0 Challenger, 1 Futures
- Highest ranking: No. 461 (16 July 2012)

Doubles
- Career record: 1–3
- Career titles: 0; 0 Challenger, 12 Futures
- Highest ranking: No. 233 (2 May 2011)
- Last updated on: 2 July 2021.

Luis "Luigi" Díaz Barriga (born 9 April 1986) is a Mexican former professional tennis player.

Diaz Barriga competed mainly on the ATP Challenger Tour and ITF Futures Tour, both in singles and doubles. He reached his highest ATP singles ranking, No. 461 on 16 July 2012, and his highest ATP doubles ranking, No. 233, on 2 May 2011.

== ATP Challenger and ITF Futures finals ==
=== Singles: 2 (1–1) ===
Legend ATP Challenger (0–0) ITF Futures (1–1)	Finals by surface Hard (1–1) Clay (0–0) Grass (0–0) Carpet (0–0)

Result	W–L	Date	Tournament	Tier	Surface	Opponent	Score
Loss	0–1	Sep 2011	Mexico F11, Mazatlán	Futures	Hard	(Mexico) Eduardo Peralta-Tello	3–6, 3–6
Win	1–1	Oct 2011	Mexico F12, Veracruz	Futures	Hard	(New Zealand) Marcus Daniell	6–4, 3–6, 6–3

=== Doubles: 26 (12–14) ===
Legend ATP Challenger (0–1) ITF Futures (12–13)	Finals by surface Hard (6–10) Clay (6–4) Grass (0–0) Carpet (0–0)

Result	W–L	Date	Tournament	Tier	Surface	Partner	Opponents	Score
Loss	0–1	Oct 2008	Mexico F12, Mazatlán	Futures	Hard	(Mexico) Daniel Garza	(France) Fabrice Martin (Canada) Adil Shamasdin	walkover
Win	1–1	Feb 2009	Mexico F2, Naucalpan	Futures	Hard	(Mexico) Antonio Ruiz-Rosales	(Philippines) Treat Huey (United States) Gregory Ouellette	6–3, 6–2
Loss	1–2	Mar 2009	USA F6, McAllen	Futures	Hard	(Mexico) Antonio Ruiz-Rosales	(United States) Ruben Gonzales (Sweden) Andreas Siljeström	3–6, 7–6^{(12–10)}, [4–10]
Loss	1–3	Jul 2009	USA F18, Joplin	Futures	Hard	(United States) Robbye Poole	(United States) Cory Parr (United States) Todd Paul	1–6, 2–6
Loss	1–4	Sep 2009	Mexico F9, León	Futures	Hard	(Mexico) Antonio Ruiz-Rosales	(Mexico) Juan Manuel Elizondo (Mexico) Miguel Gallardo Valles	0–6, 7–5, [5–10]
Loss	1–5	Feb 2010	Mexico F1, Mexico City	Futures	Hard	(Mexico) Miguel Ángel Reyes-Varela	(Mexico) Daniel Garza (Mexico) Bruno Rodríguez	4–6, 5–7
Loss	1–6	Apr 2010	Brazil F2, Bauru	Futures	Clay	(Mexico) Miguel Ángel Reyes-Varela	(Venezuela) Miguel Cicenia (Argentina) Maximiliano Estévez	6–7^{(3–7)}, 6–2, [6–10]
Win	2–6	May 2010	Brazil F4, Fortaleza	Futures	Clay	(Mexico) Miguel Ángel Reyes-Varela	(Brazil) Franco Ferreiro (Brazil) Fernando Romboli	6–7^{(5–7)}, 7–6^{(7–2)}, [10–6]
Win	3–6	May 2010	Brazil F5, Teresina	Futures	Clay	(Mexico) Miguel Ángel Reyes-Varela	(Brazil) Alexandre Bonatto (Brazil) José Pereira	6–4, 3–6, [10–7]
Loss	3–7	May 2010	Brazil F6, Caldas Novas	Futures	Hard	(Mexico) Miguel Ángel Reyes-Varela	(Brazil) André Miele (Brazil) Franco Ferreiro	3–6, 4–6
Loss	3–8	May 2010	Brazil F7, Marília	Futures	Clay	(Mexico) Miguel Ángel Reyes-Varela	(Brazil) Marcelo Demoliner (Brazil) Rodrigo Guidolin	6–4, 1–6, [9–11]
Win	4–8	May 2010	Brazil F8, Juiz de Fora	Futures	Clay	(Mexico) Miguel Ángel Reyes-Varela	(Brazil) Thales Turini (Brazil) Gustavo Junqueira	6–2, 6–0
Loss	4–9	Jun 2010	Venezuela F2, Coro	Futures	Hard	(Mexico) Miguel Ángel Reyes-Varela	(Colombia) Juan Sebastián Cabal (Colombia) Robert Farah	6–7^{(5–7)}, 6–7^{(6–8)}
Loss	4–10	Aug 2010	Italy F21, Appiano	Futures	Clay	(Mexico) Miguel Ángel Reyes-Varela	(Egypt) Karim Maamoun (Egypt) Sherif Sabry	4–6, 5–7
Win	5–10	Sep 2010	Italy F24, Trieste	Futures	Clay	(Mexico) Miguel Ángel Reyes-Varela	(Italy) Marco Bortolotti (Italy) Alessandro Giannessi	7–5, 6–3
Win	6–10	Dec 2010	Mexico F12, Guerrero	Futures	Clay	(Mexico) Miguel Ángel Reyes-Varela	(Guatemala) Christopher Díaz Figueroa (Ecuador) Iván Endara	6–2, 6–3
Win	7–10	Jan 2011	Mexico F1, Mexico City	Futures	Hard	(Mexico) Miguel Ángel Reyes-Varela	(Mexico) Mauricio Astorga (Mexico) Miguel Gallardo Valles	6–4, 7–6^{(7–5)}
Loss	7–11	Feb 2011	El Salvador F1, Santa Tecla	Futures	Clay	(Mexico) Miguel Ángel Reyes-Varela	(Australia) Chris Letcher (Australia) Brendan Moore	2–6, 2–6
Loss	7–12	Mar 2011	San Jose, Costa Rica	Challenger	Hard	(Mexico) Santiago González	(Colombia) Juan Sebastián Cabal (Colombia) Robert Farah	3–6, 3–6
Win	8–12	May 2011	Mexico F4, Guadalajara	Futures	Hard	(Mexico) Antonio Ruiz-Rosales	(Barbados) Darian King (Barbados) Haydn Lewis	7–6^{(9–7)}, 6–4
Loss	8–13	Jun 2011	Mexico F5, Celaya	Futures	Hard	(Mexico) Miguel Ángel Reyes-Varela	(Guatemala) Christopher Díaz Figueroa (Uruguay) Marcel Felder	6–3, 3–6, [5–10]
Loss	8–14	Sep 2011	Mexico F11, Mazatlán	Futures	Hard	(United States) Chris Kwon	(New Zealand) Marvin Barker (Australia) Chris Letcher	3–6, 2–6
Win	9–14	Dec 2011	Mexico F14, Ixtapa	Futures	Hard	(United States) Adam El Mihdawy	(Mexico) César Ramírez (Australia) Nima Roshan	6–4, 6–4
Win	10–14	Dec 2011	Mexico F16, Guadalajara	Futures	Clay	(United States) Adam El Mihdawy	(Mexico) Bruno Rodríguez (Mexico) Manuel Sánchez	6–3, 6–3
Win	11–14	Apr 2012	Mexico F3, Córdoba	Futures	Hard	(Australia) Chris Letcher	(Italy) Riccardo Ghedin (United States) Denis Zivkovic	6–2, 7–6^{(7–3)}
Win	12–14	Apr 2012	Mexico F4, Mexico City	Futures	Hard	(Mexico) Daniel Garza	(New Zealand) Marvin Barker (Australia) Chris Letcher	6–4, 6–3
