= Abierto Internacional Varonil Casablanca Cancún =

Defunct tennis tournament
- Location: Cancún, Mexico
- Category: ATP Challenger Tour
- Surface: Clay (red)
- Draw: 32S/17Q/16D
- Prize money: $35,000+H

The Abierto Internacional Varonil Casablanca Cancún was a professional tennis tournament played on outdoor red clay courts. It was part of the Association of Tennis Professionals (ATP) Challenger Tour. It was held in Cancún, Mexico, in 2008, 2009 and 2010.

== Past finals ==
=== Singles ===
Year	Champion	Runner-up	Score	Ref.
2010	(Spain) Pere Riba	(Argentina) Carlos Berlocq	6–4, 6–0	
2009	(Chile) Nicolás Massú	(Slovenia) Grega Žemlja	6–3, 7–5	
2008	(Slovenia) Grega Žemlja	(Argentina) Martín Alund	6–2, 6–1	

=== Doubles ===
Year	Champions	Runners-up	Score
2010	(Dominican Republic) Víctor Estrella (Mexico) Santiago González	(Austria) Rainer Eitzinger (Mexico) César Ramírez	6–1, 7–6(3)
2009	(Germany) Andre Begemann (Portugal) Leonardo Tavares	(United States) Greg Ouellette (Canada) Adil Shamasdin	6–1, 6–7(6), [10–8]
2008	(Poland) Łukasz Kubot (Austria) Oliver Marach	(Chinese Taipei) Lee Hsin-han (Chinese Taipei) Yang Tsung-hua	7–5, 6–2
