= 2014 ATP World Tour Finals =

- Date: 9–16 November
- Edition: 45th (singles) / 40th (doubles)
- Category: ATP World Tour Finals
- Draw: 8S/8D
- Prize money: $6,500,000
- Surface: Hard / indoor
- Location: London, United Kingdom
- Venue: O_{2} arena

Champions

Singles
- (Serbia) Novak Djokovic

Doubles
- (United States) Bob Bryan / (United States) Mike Bryan
- ATP World Tour Finals

The 2014 ATP World Tour Finals (also known as the 2014 Barclays ATP World Tour Finals for sponsorship reasons) was a men's tennis year-end tournament played at the O_{2} Arena in London, United Kingdom, between 9 and 16 November 2014. It was the season-ending event for the best singles players and doubles teams on the 2014 ATP World Tour. The Bryan Brothers won the title at the doubles tournament, while Novak Djokovic successfully defended his single title for the second time after Roger Federer withdrew from the final, the first walkover in a final in the tournament's 45-year history.

== Finals ==
=== Singles ===
(Serbia) Novak Djokovic defeated (Switzerland) Roger Federer, w/o

- It was Djokovic's 7th title of the year and 48th of his career. It was his 4th win at the event, winning in 2008, 2012, and 2013.

=== Doubles ===
(United States) Bob Bryan / (United States) Mike Bryan defeated (Croatia) Ivan Dodig / (Brazil) Marcelo Melo, 6–7^{(5–7)}, 6–2, [10–7]

== Tournament ==
The 2014 ATP World Tour Finals took place from 9 to 16 November at the O_{2} Arena in London, United Kingdom. It was the 45th edition of the tournament (40th in doubles). The tournament was run by the Association of Tennis Professionals (ATP) and was part of the 2014 ATP World Tour. The event took place on indoor hard courts. It served as the season-ending championships for players on the ATP Tour. The eight players who qualified for the event were split into two groups of four. During this stage, players competed in a round-robin format (meaning players played against all the other players in their group). The two players with the best results in each group progressed to the semifinals, where the winners of a group faced the runners-up of the other group. This stage, however, was a knock-out stage. The doubles competition used the same format.

=== Format ===
The ATP World Tour Finals had a round-robin format, with eight players/teams divided into two groups of four. The eight seeds were determined by the ATP rankings and ATP Doubles Team Rankings on the Monday after the last ATP World Tour tournament of the calendar year. All singles matches were best of three tie-break sets, including the final. All doubles matches were two sets (no ad) and a Match Tie-break.

== Points and prize money ==
Stage	Singles	Doubles^{1}	Points
Champion	RR + $1,455,000	RR + $226,000	RR + 900
Runner-up	RR + $475,000	RR + $76,000	RR + 400
Round robin win per match	$155,000	$30,000	200
Participation fee	$155,000	$76,000	—N/a
Alternates	$85,000	$30,000	—N/a

- RR is points or prize money won in the round robin stage.
- ^{1} Prize money for doubles is per team.

== Qualification ==
The top eight players (or teams) with the most countable points accumulated in Grand Slam, ATP World Tour, and Davis Cup tournaments during the year qualify for the 2014 ATP World Tour Finals. Countable points include points earned in 2014, plus points earned at the 2013 Davis Cup final and the late-season 2013 Challengers played after the 2013 ATP World Tour Finals.

To qualify, a player who finished in the 2013 year-end top 30 must compete in four Grand Slam tournaments and eight ATP World Tour Masters 1000 tournaments during 2014. They can count their best six results from ATP World Tour 500, ATP World Tour 250 and other events (Challengers, Futures, Davis Cup, Olympics) toward their ranking. To count their best six, players must have fulfilled their commitment to 500 events – four total per year (at least one after the US Open).

Additionally, commitment players will no longer need to enter the 500 events 12 weeks in advance but instead go back the normal six-week entry deadline. If eligible to play in one of the Grand Slam or ATP World Tour Masters 1000 tournaments, a player must count the points from these tournaments, even if it is 'a zero pointer' because he missed the event. If a player does not play enough ATP 500 events and does not have an ATP 250 or Challenger appearance with a better result, the Davis Cup is counted in the 500s table (if the player entered or achieved better results). If a player does not play enough ATP 250 or Challenger events, the World Team Championship is counted in the 250s table (if the player entered or achieved better results). If a player could not be present in all required tournament classes (i.e. because of an injury), all uncounted ATP 250 or Challenger results are eligible to be included in his 18 valid tournaments. In teams rankings, Challenger points are excluded.

The 2014 ATP World Tour Finals counts as an additional 19th tournament in the ranking of its eight qualifiers at season's end, while the 2014 Davis Cup Final points count towards the next year's race.

If a player (or team) wins one of the four Grand Slams during the year but finishes outside the top eight (and within the top 20) in the year-end rankings, they will qualify ahead of the player (or team) ranked eighth. If two players (or teams) are in this situation, the lower-ranked will be given the first alternate position ahead of the player (or team) ranked eighth.

== Contenders points breakdown ==
Rankings as of 1 November 2014.

- Players in gold were the qualifiers.
- Player in bold won the title at the finals.
- Players in whose seed is – withdrew before the tournament.
- Players whose seed is inside a ( ) withdrew during the tournament and were replaced by an alternate.
- Alternates whose seed is inside a [ ] replaced a qualifier during the tournament.

=== Singles ===
Sd	Rk	Player	Grand Slam				ATP World Tour Masters 1000								Best Other						Total points	Tourn
Sd	Rk	Player	**AUS**	**FRA**	**WIM**	**USO**	**IW**	**MI**	**MA**	**RO**	**CA**	**CI**	**SH**	**PA**	1	2	3	4	5	6	Total points	Tourn
1	1	**(Serbia) Novak Djokovic**	QF; 360	F 1200	**W** **2000**	SF; 720	**W** **1000**	**W** **1000**	A 0	**W** **1000**	R16; 90	R16; 90	SF; 360	**W** **1000**	**W** **500**	SF; 360	SF; 180	DC; 150			10010	17
2	2	(Switzerland) Roger Federer	SF; 720	R16; 180	F 1200	SF; 720	F 600	QF; 180	A 0	R32; 10	F 600	**W** **1000**	**W** **1000**	QF; 180	F 600	**W** **500**	**W** **500**	DC; 310	**W** **250**	F 150	8700	18
–	3	(Spain) Rafael Nadal	F 1200	**W** **2000**	R16; 180	A 0	R32; 45	F 600	**W** **1000**	F 600	A 0	A 0	R32; 10	A 0	**W** **500**	**W** **250**	QF; 180	QF; 90	QF; 90	QF; 90	6835	19
3	4	(Switzerland) Stan Wawrinka	**W** **2000**	R128; 10	QF; 360	QF; 360	R16; 90	R16; 90	R32; 10	R16; 90	R16; 90	QF; 180	R32; 10	R16; 90	**W** **1000**	**W** **250**	DC; 175	SF; 90	R32; 0	R32; 0	4895	18
4	5	(Japan) Kei Nishikori	R16; 180	R128; 10	R16; 180	F 1200	R32; 45	SF; 360	F 600	A 0	A 0	A 0	R32; 10	SF; 360	**W** **500**	**W** **500**	**W** **250**	**W** **250**	QF; 90	SF; 90	4625	21
5	6	(United Kingdom) Andy Murray	QF; 360	SF; 720	QF; 360	QF; 360	R16; 90	QF; 180	R16; 90	QF; 180	QF; 180	QF; 180	R16; 90	QF; 180	**W** **500**	**W** **250**	**W** **250**	SF; 180	SF; 180	DC; 145	4475	21
6	7	(Czech Republic) Tomáš Berdych	SF; 720	QF; 360	R32; 90	QF; 360	R64; 10	SF; 360	QF; 180	R16; 90	R16; 90	R32; 10	QF; 180	SF; 360	**W** **500**	F 300	F 300	**W** **250**	DC; 155	F 150	4465	23
(7)	8	(Canada) Milos Raonic	R32; 90	QF; 360	SF; 720	R16; 180	QF; 180	QF; 180	R16; 90	SF; 360	QF; 180	SF; 360	R32; 10	F 600	**W** **500**	F 300	QF; 180	QF; 90	QF; 45	DC; 15	4440	20
8	9	(Croatia) Marin Čilić	R64; 45	R32; 90	QF; 360	**W** **2000**	R16; 90	R64; 10	R16; 90	R32; 45	R16; 90	R16; 90	R64; 10	A 0	F 300	**W** **250**	**W** **250**	**W** **250**	QF; 90	QF; 90	4150	24
**Alternates**
[9]	10	(Spain) David Ferrer	QF; 360	QF; 360	R64; 45	R32; 90	A 0	R16; 90	SF; 360	QF; 180	QF; 180	F 600	QF; 180	QF; 180	SF; 360	F 300	**W** **250**	SF; 180	SF; 180	F 150	4045	25
–	11	(Bulgaria) Grigor Dimitrov	QF; 360	R128; 10	SF; 720	R16; 180	R32; 45	R32; 45	R16; 90	SF; 360	SF; 360	R32; 10	R32; 45	R16; 90	**W** **500**	**W** **250**	**W** **250**	F 150	R16; 90	QF; 90	3645	21
–	12	(France) Jo-Wilfried Tsonga	R16; 180	R16; 180	R16; 180	R16; 180	R64; 10	R16; 90	R32; 45	R16; 90	**W** **1000**	R64; 10	A 0	R16; 90	QF; 180	DC; 175	F 150	QF; 90	R16; 45	QF; 45	2740	20
–	13	(Latvia) Ernests Gulbis	R64; 45	SF; 720	R64; 45	R64; 45	QF; 180	R64; 10	QF; 180	R16; 90	R32; 45	R32; 45	R64; 10	A 0	**W** **250**	**W** **250**	SF; 180	SF; 180	SF; 90	SF; 90	2455	24
10	14	(Spain) Feliciano López	R32; 90	R64; 45	R16; 180	R32; 90	R16; 90	R32; 45	QF; 180	R64; 10	SF; 360	R64; 10	SF; 360	R16; 90	**W** **250**	F 150	R16; 45	R16; 45	QF; 45	QF; 45	2130	27

=== Doubles ===
Seed	Rank	Team	Points																		Total Points	Tourn
Seed	Rank	Team	1	2	3	4	5	6	7	8	9	10	11	12	13	14	15	16	17	18	Total Points	Tourn
1	1	Bob Bryan (USA); Mike Bryan (USA)	**W** **2000**	F 1200	**W** **1000**	**W** **1000**	**W** **1000**	**W** **1000**	**W** **1000**	**W** **1000**	F 600	QF; 360	SF; 360	**W** **250**	**W** **250**	R16; 180	F 150	QF; 90	DC; 60	QF; 45	11545	21
2	2	Daniel Nestor (CAN); Nenad Zimonjić (SRB)	**W** **1000**	**W** **1000**	SF; 720	QF; 360	QF; 360	SF; 360	SF; 360	F 300	F 300	**W** **250**	R16; 180	QF; 180	QF; 180	R16; 90	QF; 90	SF; 90	R16; 0	R16; 0	5820	19
3	3	Alexander Peya (AUT); Bruno Soares (BRA)	**W** **1000**	F 600	QF; 360	QF; 360	F 300	**W** **250**	R16; 180	QF; 180	QF; 180	QF; 180	QF; 180	QF; 180	SF; 180	F 150	F 150	F 150	R32; 90	QF; 90	4760	25
4	4	Julien Benneteau (FRA); Édouard Roger-Vasselin (FRA)	**W** **2000**	F 600	QF; 360	SF; 360	**W** **250**	SF; 180	R16; 180	QF; 180	QF; 180	SF; 90	SF; 90	SF; 90	R16; 90	R16; 90	R32; 0	R64; 0			4740	17
5	5	Jean-Julien Rojer (NED); Horia Tecău (ROU)	**W** **500**	**W** **500**	**W** **500**	SF; 360	F 300	**W** **250**	**W** **250**	**W** **250**	**W** **250**	**W** **250**	R16; 180	R16; 180	R16; 180	QF; 180	QF; 180	R32; 90	R16; 90	R32; 0	4490	28
6	6	Marcel Granollers (ESP); Marc López (ESP)	F 1200	F 1200	SF; 360	SF; 360	**W** **250**	R16; 180	QF; 180	SF; 180	SF; 180	R32; 90	R16; 90	QF; 90	SF; 90	R32; 0	R32; 0	R16; 0	R16; 0		4450	17
7	7	Ivan Dodig (CRO); Marcelo Melo (BRA)	SF; 720	F 600	F 600	F 300	R16; 180	QF; 180	QF; 180	QF; 180	SF; 180	SF; 180	R16; 90	QF; 90	SF; 90	R16; 0	R16; 0	R16; 0	R16; 0		3570	19
8	9	Łukasz Kubot (POL); Robert Lindstedt (SWE)	**W** **2000**	QF; 360	R32; 90	QF; 90	R16; 90	R16; 90	R16; 90	R16; 90	QF; 90	QF; 45	QF; 45	R16; 0	R16; 0	R16; 0	R16; 0	R16; 0	R16; 0	R16; 0	3080	18
Alternates
9	8	Eric Butorac (USA); Raven Klaasen (RSA)	F 1200	QF; 360	**W** **250**	**W** **250**	R16; 180	QF; 180	SF; 180	R32; 90	R16; 90	R16; 90	R16; 90	QF; 90	SF; 90	SF; 90	SF; 90	QF; 45	R16; 20	R32; 0	3385	27
10	10	Vasek Pospisil (CAN); Jack Sock (USA)	**W** **2000**	F 600	**W** **250**	R16; 180	R32; 0	R16; 0	R16; 0												3030	7

== Qualified players ==
=== Singles ===
#	Players	Points	Tours	Date Qualified
1	Novak Djokovic (SRB)	10,010	17	7 July
2	Roger Federer (SUI)	8,700	18	18 August
inj	Rafael Nadal (ESP)	6,835	19	14 July
3	Stan Wawrinka (SUI)	4,895	18	13 October
4	Kei Nishikori (JPN)	4,625	21	31 October
5	Andy Murray (GBR)	4,475	21	30 October
6	Tomáš Berdych (CZE)	4,465	23	31 October
7	Milos Raonic (CAN)	4,200	20	31 October
8	Marin Čilić (CRO)	4,150	24	18 October

On 7 July 2014, Novak Djokovic was announced as the tournament's first qualifier following his victory at the Wimbledon Championships and subsequent return to World No. 1 in the ATP rankings.

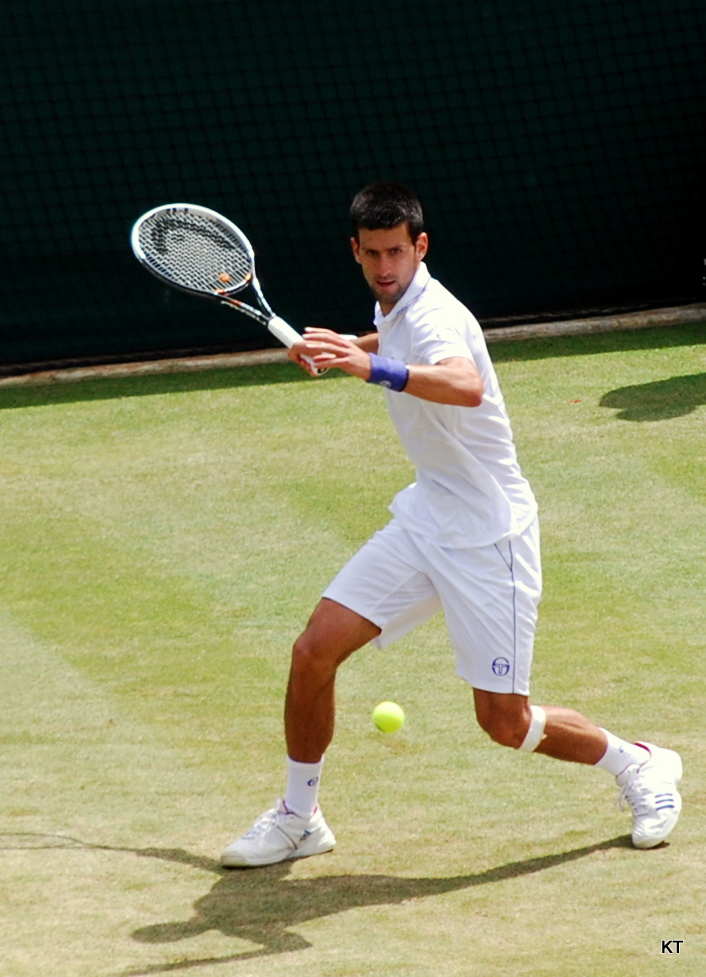
Djokovic won his seventh Grand Slam singles title at the Wimbledon Championships.

Novak Djokovic began the year by failing to defend his title at the Australian Open, losing to the eventual champion, Stanislas Wawrinka in a five-set upset, thus ending his 25-match winning streak at the event and his streak of 14 consecutive semi-final appearances at the grand slams. He recovered from the loss by winning back-to-back Masters 1000 titles at the BNP Paribas Open and Sony Open Tennis for the second time in his career, defeating Roger Federer and Rafael Nadal respectively. During the clay court season, Djokovic won the Internazionali BNL d'Italia for the third time, defeating Nadal in three sets before reaching his second French Open final, but once again lost in four sets. The following month, he ended his Grand Slam title drought by defeating Federer in a five-set final at Wimbledon Championships to claim his second title at the event and his seventh Slam singles title overall. He also returned to world no. 1 in the ATP rankings as a result of the victory. Djokovic did not enjoy a successful US Open Series however, as he lost in the third round in both Canada and Cincinnati, marking the first time since 2009 where Djokovic has failed to reach the quarterfinals of consecutive Masters events. At the US Open, he was upset by Japan's Kei Nishikori in the semi-finals. Although he rebounded by winning his fifth title of the year at the China Open, his 28-match winning streak in China was snapped by Federer at the Shanghai Rolex Masters. However, the Serbian recovered by defending his title at the BNP Paribas Masters defeating Canadian Milos Raonic in the final. Djokovic is set to make his eighth consecutive appearance at this year's year-end championships.

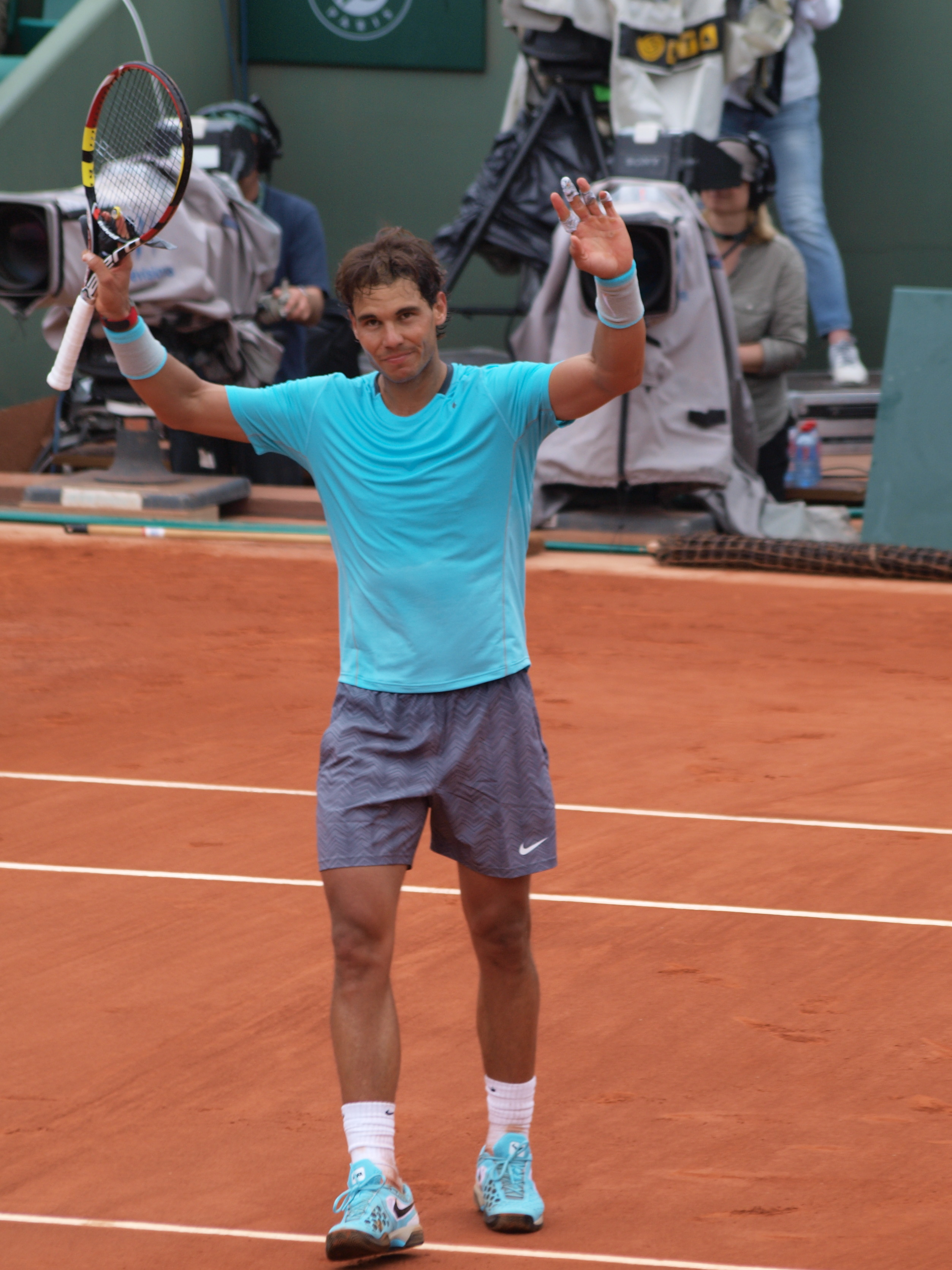
Rafael Nadal won his 14th Slam singles title at 2014 French Open

On 14 July, Rafael Nadal became the second player to qualify for the event.

Rafael Nadal began the season at the Qatar Open, where he won the title after defeating Gaël Monfils in the final. At the Australian Open, he reached his 19th Grand Slam final. Nadal lost the final in four sets to Stanislas Wawrinka, against whom he entered the match with a 12–0 record. Next, Nadal won the title at the Rio Open after defeating Alexandr Dolgopolov in the final, extending his record of ATP 500 titles to 15. Nadal reached the final of the Sony Open Tennis before falling to Novak Djokovic in straight sets. Nadal won the Mutua Madrid Open, after Kei Nishikori retired in the third set. Nadal then reached the final of the Internazionali BNL d'Italia losing to world no. 2 Novak Djokovic. At the French Open, Nadal defeated Novak Djokovic in four sets to win his ninth French Open title and a fifth straight win at Roland Garros. Nadal equaled Pete Sampras' total of 14 Grand Slam wins, the second highest number of single Grand Slam titles after Roger Federer. Nadal then entered the Wimbledon Championships in a bid to win the tournament for the third time and to win his 15th Grand Slam title overall, but he lost in the fourth round to the Australian teenager Nick Kyrgios (ranked no. 143), marking the third consecutive time he has failed to reach the quarterfinals of the said slam. Nadal then skipped the entire US Open Series due to a right wrist injury. He came back in the Asian swing and Swiss Indoors Basel but didn't have much success falling before the semifinals in the events he entered. Nadal then withdrew from the BNP Paribas Masters. Nadal has qualified for the tenth consecutive time for the event, however on 24 October, he pulled out of the tournament, stating that he will undergo appendix surgery in November.

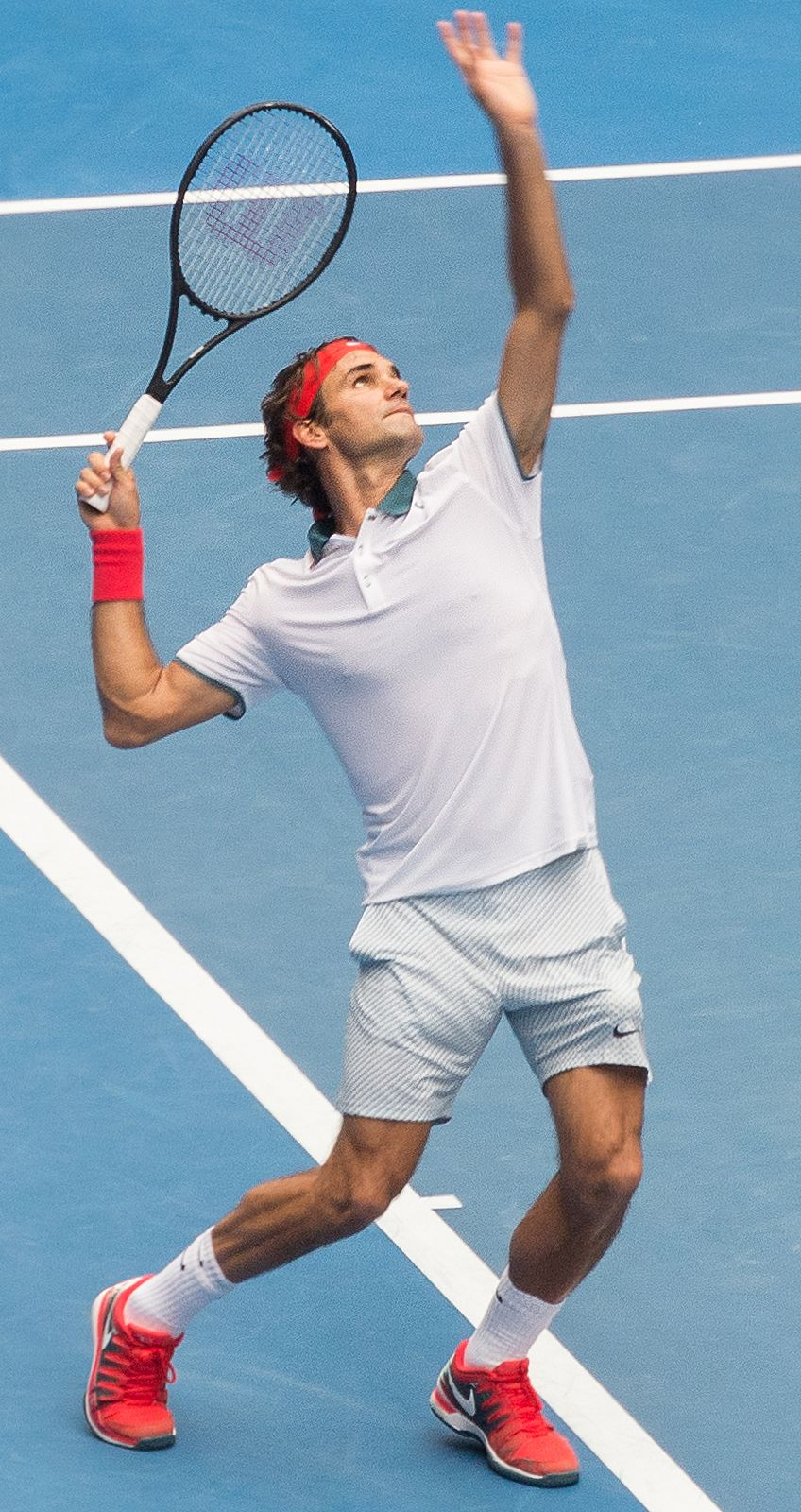
Federer had a resurgent 2014 season

On 18 August, Roger Federer qualified for a record 13th straight year after clinching his 80th career title at the Cincinnati Masters.

Roger Federer opened his season at the Brisbane event, losing the final to Lleyton Hewitt. At the Australian Open, Federer lost to Rafael Nadal in the semifinals. He won the title in Dubai. Next, Federer reached the final at the Indian Wells Masters, losing to Novak Djokovic in three sets. In Miami, he reached the quarterfinals before losing to Kei Nishikori. Federer began his clay season with a wildcard entry into the Monte-Carlo Masters, where he lost the final to his compatriot Stan Wawrinka. At the French Open, Federer was upset in the fourth round by Ernest Gulbis. Federer began his grass season in Gerry Weber Open, winning a record seventh title, this time over Alejandro Falla. Roger Federer reached his 25th Slam final at Wimbledon, his first slam final since winning the same event in 2012, however he was defeated by Novak Djokovic in a five-set epic match. On the US Open Series, Federer reached another final in the Rogers Cup losing to Frenchman Jo-Wilfried Tsonga. He won his 80th career title the following week at the Western & Southern Open defeating David Ferrer in three sets, his first Masters title, since the same event in 2012. At the US Open, Federer reached the semifinals before losing to eventual champion Marin Čilić. During the Asian swing of tournaments, Federer won his first Shanghai Masters title, defeating two-time defending champion Novak Djokovic in the semifinals before beating Gilles Simon in the final for his second Masters 1000 title of the season. Federer then won his fifth title of the year at his home tournament Swiss Indoors Basel defeating David Goffin in straight sets. Federer has qualified for the thirteenth consecutive year for the Tour Finals, an all-time record.

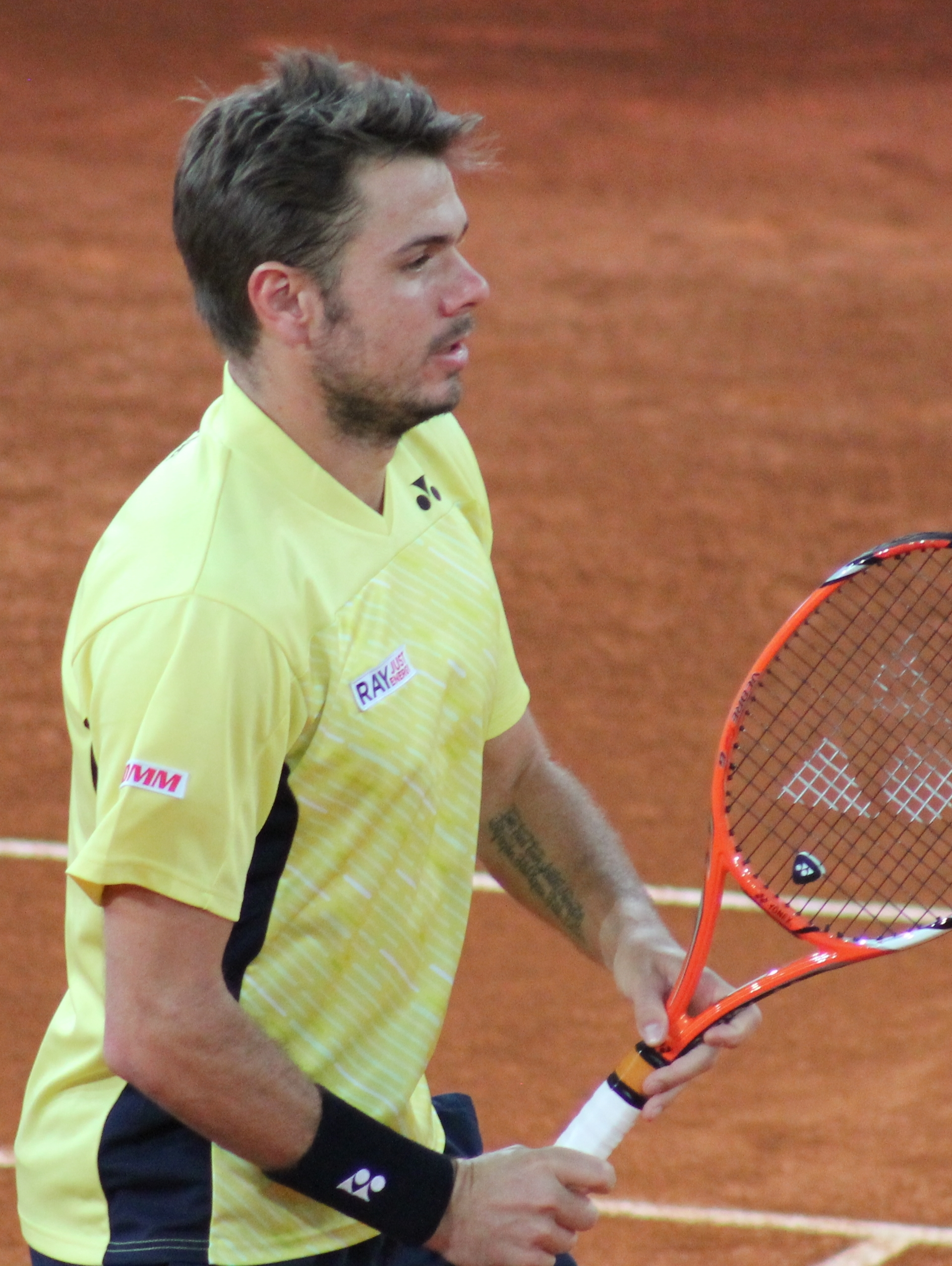
Stanislas Wawrinka won his maiden Slam singles title at 2014 Australian Open

On 12 October, Stan Wawrinka became the fourth player to qualify.

Stan Wawrinka had his best ever start to an ATP World tour season, winning the Aircel Chennai Open defeating Édouard Roger-Vasselin in straight sets in the final before going on to clinch his maiden Grand Slam trophy at the Australian Open, defeating Djokovic in a 5-set thriller in the quarterfinals, followed by a win over Nadal in the final. His 13-match winning streak was eventually ended in the fourth round of Indian Wells, losing to Kevin Anderson in three sets. After helping Switzerland to the Davis Cup semifinals, Wawrinka won his first ever Masters 1000 title, defeating countryman Roger Federer in the final of the Monte-Carlo Masters. Following this win, he suffered a dip in form, only winning one of his next four matches, including a first round loss to Guillermo García López at the French Open. He had his best ever grass court season, making the semifinals of the Queen's Club championships before reaching his first ever Wimbledon quarterfinal, losing to eventual finalist Federer in four sets. Wawrinka reached the quarterfinals at the US Open, losing to eventual finalist Kei Nishikori in five sets. He and countryman Federer then combined to reach the Davis Cup final for only the second time in the country's history, Wawrinka winning his singles and the doubles rubbers. However, Wawrinka suffered a three match losing streak, losing his first matches at the Asian swing and Swiss Indoors Basel, he snapped the losing streak at the BNP Paribas Masters defeating Dominic Thiem but lost in the next round. This is the second time Wawrinka has qualified for the ATP World Tour Finals, having made his maiden appearance in 2013.

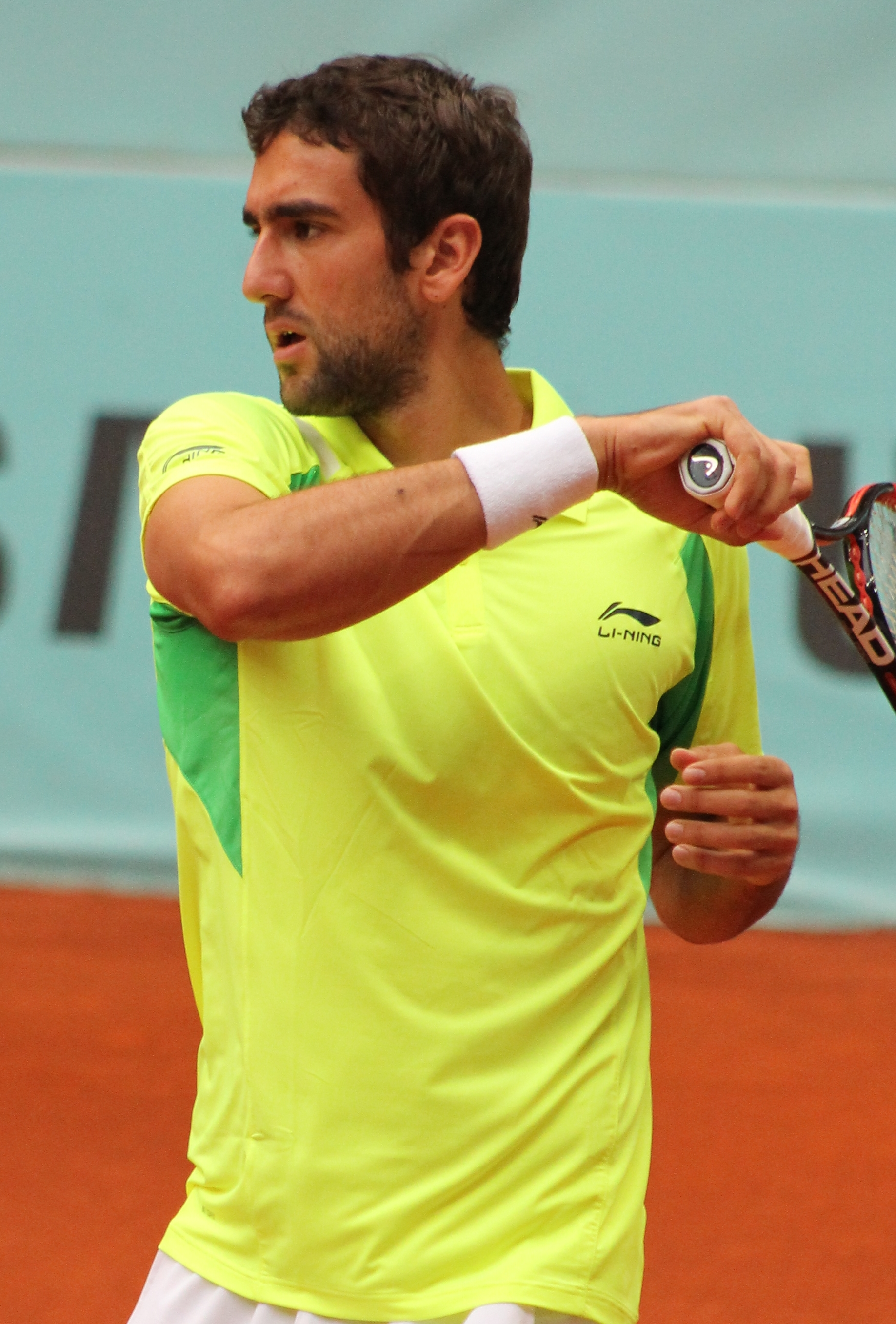
Marin Čilić won his maiden slam at the US Open.

On 18 October, Marin Čilić became the fifth player to qualify.

Marin Čilić had a difficult start to the year, having had to serve a suspension at the back end of 2013, losing early in the event he entered in Australia, including a second round loss at the Australian Open to Gilles Simon in five sets. Čilić won his first title of the year, defending his title at the Zagreb Indoors against Tommy Haas, followed by recording victories over Jo-Wilfried Tsonga and Andy Murray to reach the final in ABN AMRO World Tennis Tournament, where he ultimately lost to Tomáš Berdych. He reached his third final in as many weeks in Delray Beach, defeating Kevin Anderson in the final to win the 11th Tour title of his career. Čilić made the third round at the French Open, losing to eventual runner-up Novak Djokovic in four sets. After a first round loss at Aegon Championships, Čilić rebounded to make his first Grand Slam quarterfinal since 2012 at Wimbledon, and despite taking a two sets to one lead against Djokovic, he ultimately lost to the eventual champion in five. After consecutive third round losses in Rogers Cup and Western & Southern Open, Čilić went on to win his maiden Grand Slam title, defeating Kei Nishikori in the final in straight sets to win the 2014 US Open men's singles title. This launched him into the top 10 for the first time since 2010, achieving a career high ranking of world number 8 in October following the Shanghai Rolex Masters. Čilić won his fourth title of the year at the Kremlin Cup defeating Roberto Bautista Agut. This is the first time Čilić has ever qualified for the season finale.

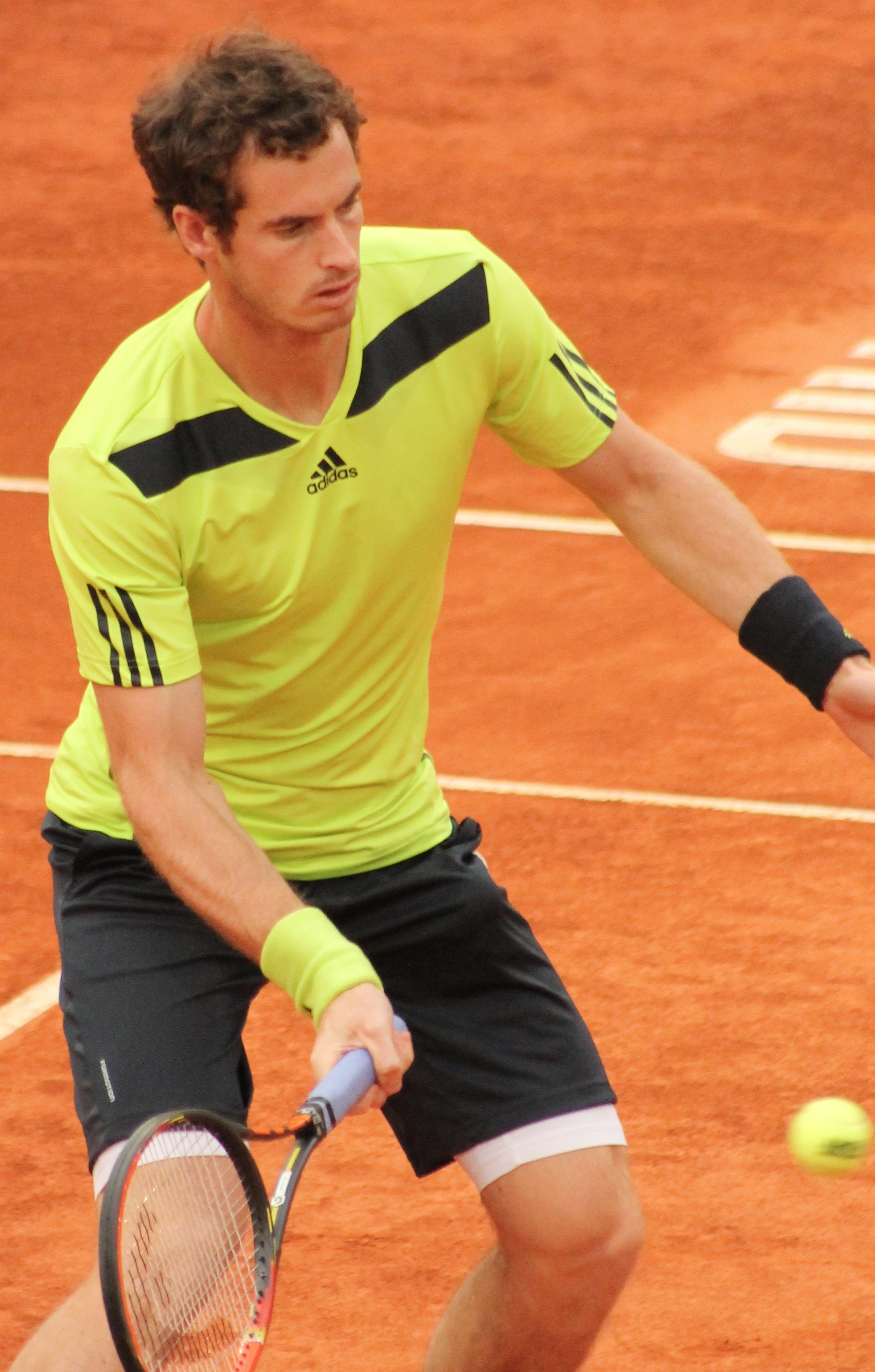
Andy Murray reached the semifinal of the French Open for the 2nd time

On 30 October, Andy Murray was announced as the sixth qualifier, following his win over Grigor Dimitrov in Paris.

Andy Murray began the year in Qatar ExxonMobil Open, in his first tournament since returning from back surgery at the end of the previous season losing to Florian Mayer in the second round. At the Australian Open, Murray reached the quarterfinals where he faced Roger Federer, losing in four sets. He then lead Great Britain to the quarterfinals of the Davis Cup, the first since 1935 for a Great Britain team. At the Italian Open, Murray faced Rafael Nadal in the quarterfinals, the first meeting between the two since 2011. Murray took the first set for the loss of one game, however went on to lose in three tight sets. Murray made it to the semifinals at the French Open, matching his best result from 2011. He again faced Nadal, but lost in straight sets. Murray was unsuccessful in his defence of his Wimbledon title, losing in the quarterfinals against Grigor Dimitrov, his first loss prior to the semifinals in the said event since 2008. He lost in the quarterfinals in Rogers Cup, Western & Southern Open and the US Open, however managed to find form during the Asian swing, winning his first title of the year at the ATP Shenzhen Open defeating Tommy Robredo after saving five match points. Murray then took wildcards into tournaments in back-to-back Erste Bank Open and Valencia Open 500, defeating Ferrer and Tommy Robredo respectively in the finals to win both titles. Murray once again saved five match points in his match against Robredo. This is the 7th straight season Murray has qualified for the year-end championships, set to make his 6th appearance after missing 2013 due to injury.

On 31 October, Tomáš Berdych, Kei Nishikori and Milos Raonic completed the field, after all three made the semifinals in Paris.

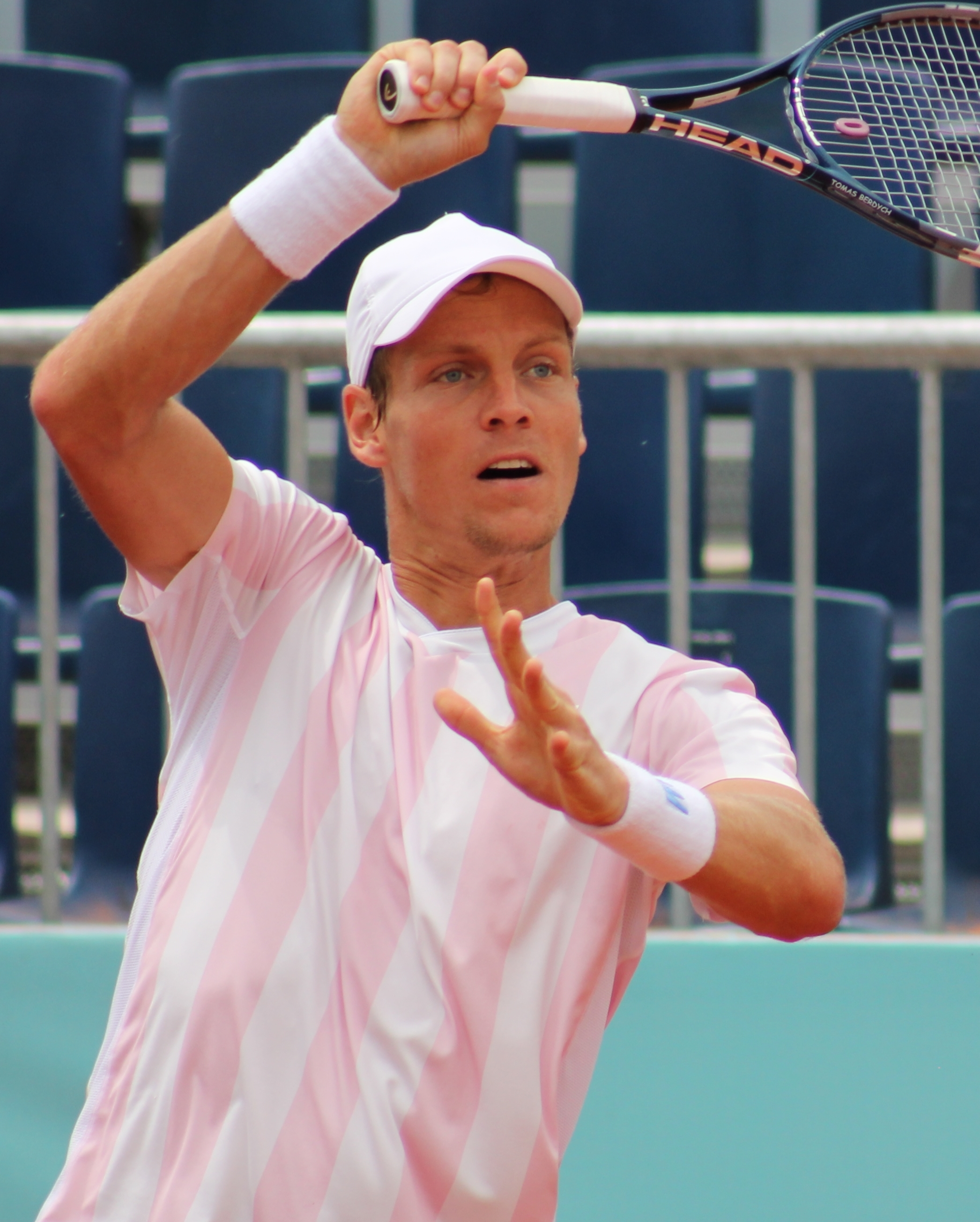
Tomáš Berdych qualifies for the fifth time

Tomáš Berdych opened his season in Doha, where he lost his opening match against Ivo Karlović in straight sets, however he rebounded well at the Australian Open, reaching only his fourth Grand Slam semifinal and first in Melbourne, which also meant he has reached the semifinal of each slam at least once. He lost to eventual champion Stan Wawrinka in four sets. At the BN AMRO World Tennis Tournament, Berdych ended a run of 16 months without a title, defeating Marin Čilić in the final. He then reached his second final in three weeks in Dubai, defeating Novak Djokovic en route to the final, where he lost to Roger Federer in three sets, his performance in the first two months of the season earned him a career high ranking of number 5 in the world. Berdych reached the semifinals in Sony Open Tennis, however withdrew before his match with Rafael Nadal, citing gastroenteritis. He reached his third final of the year at the Portugal Open losing to Carlos Berlocq, despite winning the first set in a bagel. At the French Open, he made it to the quarterfinals before losing to Ernest Gulbis in straight sets. He lost to Čilić at the third round of the Wimbledon Championships. Despite failing to win back-to-back matches in events he entered at the Series, the Czech was able to reachthe quarterfinals of the US Open, losing to eventual champion Čilić in straight sets, his second straight loss to the Croatian at a Grand Slam tournament. He lost both his singles and doubles rubbers in the Davis Cup semifinals, ending the Czech Republic's 10-tie winning streak. Berdych reached his fourth final of the year in China Open, his third of the year at ATP 500 level, however he was dominated by Djokovic in the final, winning just two games. After losing in the quarterfinals in Shanghai, Berdych won his second title of the year, beating defending champion Dimitrov to the Stockholm Open title in three sets. He sealed his place in London by reaching the semifinals in Paris, where he was defeated by Milos Raonic. This is the 5th straight year Berdych has qualified for the ATP World Tour Finals.

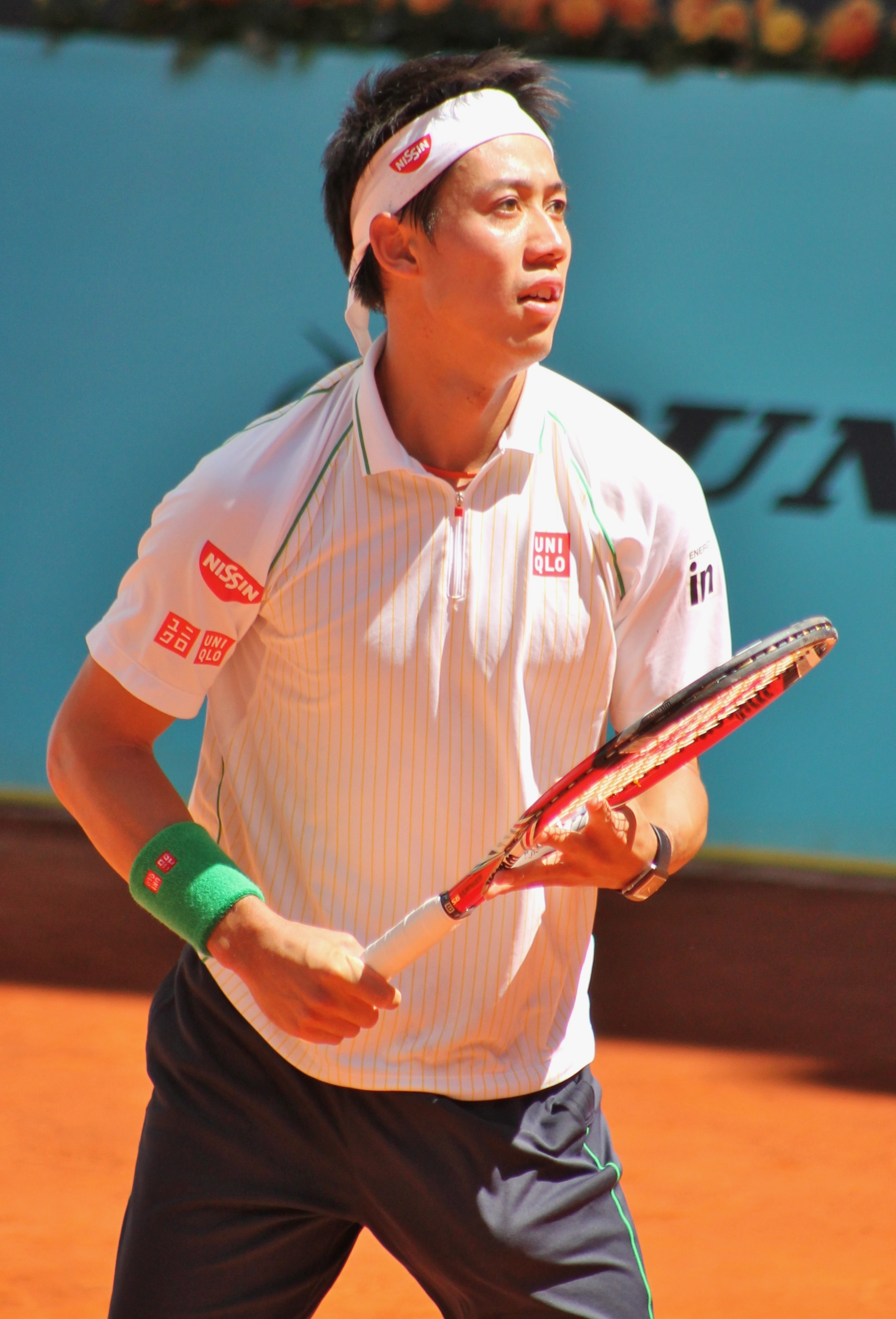
Kei Nishikori reaches his maiden slam final at the US Open.

Kei Nishikori began the year in Brisbane, where he reached the semifinals before losing to eventual champion Lleyton Hewitt. At the 2014 Australian Open, he reached the fourth round for the third year in a row before losing to Rafael Nadal in straight sets. He won his first title of the year and first in two years at the U.S. National Indoor Tennis Championships, defeating Ivo Karlović in the final in straight sets. He reached the semifinals of the Sony Open Tennis, withdrawing before his match with Novak Djokovic due to a groin injury. Nishikori won his second title of the year in Barcelona Open Banc Sabadell, defeating Santiago Giraldo in the final in straight sets. He made it to his first ever Masters 1000 final in Mutua Madrid Open, where he faced defending champion Nadal, winning the first set for the loss of two games before retiring in the third round with a back injury. His run in Madrid launched him to a career high ranking of 9th in the world. He returned at the French Open, however lost his opening match against Martin Kližan. At Wimbledon, he made it once again to the fourth round where he lost to Milos Raonic. A foot injury caused him to withdraw from both Toronto and Cincinnati, however he had his best run at a Grand Slam event at the US Open defeating Djokovic in the semifinals to reach his first ever Major final, where ultimately he lost in straight sets to Marin Čilić. In the Asian swing, Nishikori won back-to-back titles at the Malaysian Open and his home tournament in Rakuten Japan Open Tennis Championships, defeating Julien Benneteau and Raonic respectively. At the Paris Masters, he reached the semifinals to cement his place at the World Tour Finals, where he is set to make his debut appearance.

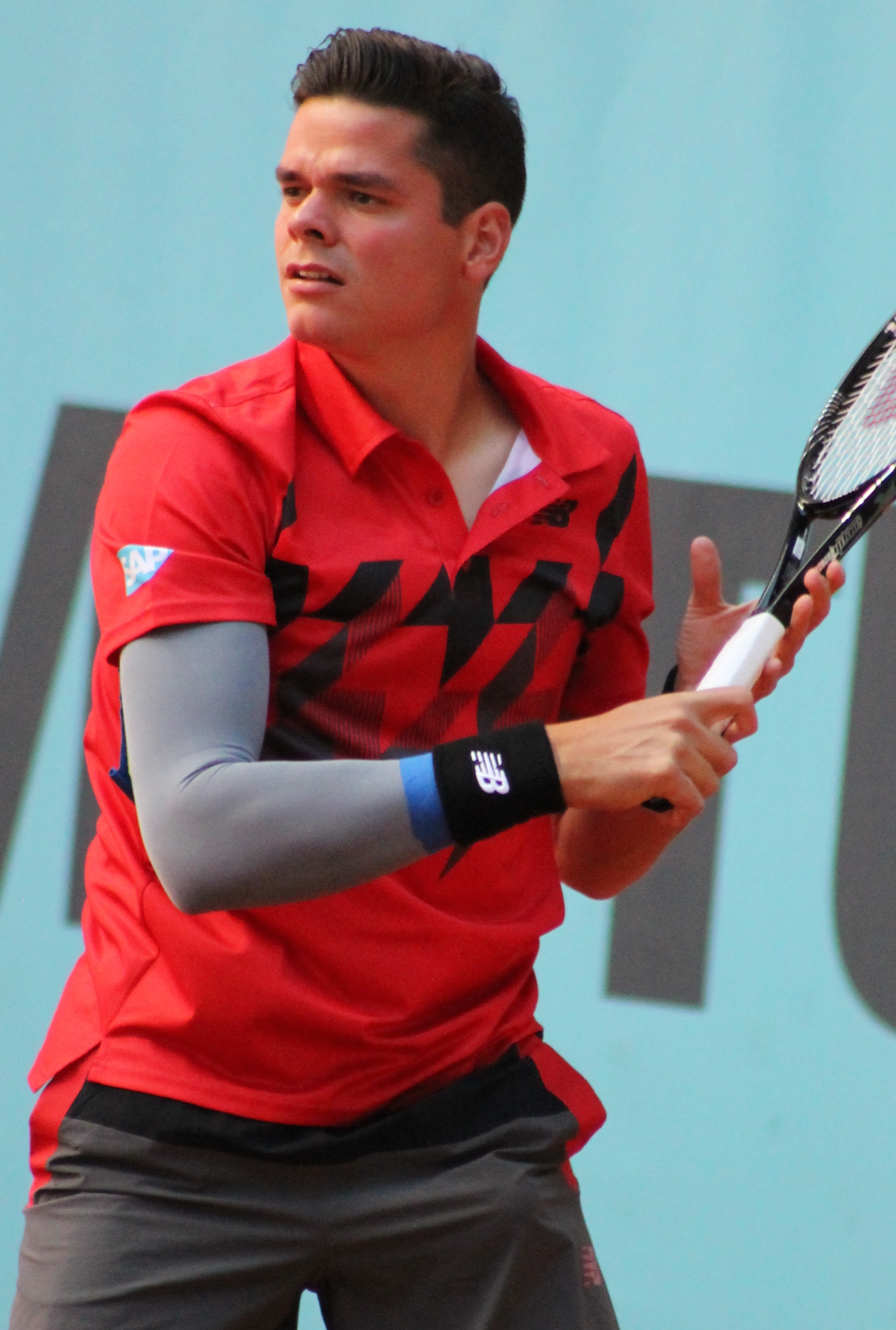
Milos Raonic qualifies for the first time

Milos Raonic had a breakthrough season. He made it to the third round at the Australian Open, losing to Grigor Dimitrov. He exited at the quarterfinals at the BNP Paribas Open, the Sony Open Tennis, and the Monte-Carlo Rolex Masters. Raonic made it to his first semifinal of the year, losing a tight three set battle against Novak Djokovic in Internazionali BNL d'Italia. At the French Open, he reached his first ever Grand Slam quarterfinal, where he lost to eventual finalist Djokovic. Raonic went on to reach his first Major semifinal at Wimbledon Championships, where he lost to Roger Federer in straight sets. He won his first title of the year in Washington, defeating fellow Canadian Vasek Pospisil in the final for the loss of just 5 games. He then lost to Feliciano López in the quarterfinals and Federer in the semifinals in Rogers Cup and Cincinnati respectively. At the US Open, Raonic reached the fourth round for the third year in a row, losing to eventual finalist Nishikori in a tight 5-set match that lasted over 4 hours. He reached his second final of the year in Rakuten Japan Open Tennis Championships; however, for the third year in a row he finished as runner-up, losing to Nishikori once again in three sets. He sealed his place at the season finale by reaching the final of the Paris Masters, where he lost to Djokovic in straight sets. This is the first time Raonic qualified for the year-end championships.

=== Doubles ===
#	Players	Points	Tours	Date qualified
1	Bob Bryan (USA); Mike Bryan (USA)	11.545	21	14 July
2	Daniel Nestor (CAN); Nenad Zimonjić (SRB)	5,820	19	9 September
3	Alexander Peya (AUT); Bruno Soares (BRA)	4,760	25	8 October
4	Julien Benneteau (FRA); Édouard Roger-Vasselin (FRA)	4,740	17	9 October
5	Jean-Julien Rojer (NED); Horia Tecău (ROU)	4,490	28	29 October
6	Marcel Granollers (ESP); Marc López (ESP)	4,450	17	29 October
7	Ivan Dodig (CRO); Marcelo Melo (BRA)	3,570	19	30 October
9	Łukasz Kubot (POL); Robert Lindstedt (SWE)	3,080	18	29 October
Kubot and Lindstedt qualified due to winning Australian Open and a top-20 finish according to the rules (P39)

On 14 July, Bob and Mike Bryan became the first doubles team to qualify for the finals.

Bob Bryan and Mike Bryan entered the year as the no. 1 team; however, they did not start the year well, including a third-round loss at the Open to Butorac/Klaasen, their first loss prior to the semifinals of a Grand Slam since 2011 US Open. The brothers bounced back by reaching the final of the U.S. National Indoor Tennis Championships, but once again lost to Butorac and Klaasen. The Bryans then continued their good form and captured five titles in a row, winning in the Delray Beach International Tennis Championships over Čermák and Elgin, BNP Paribas Open over Peya and Soares, Sony Open Tennis over Cabal and Farah, U.S. Men's Clay Court Championships over Marrero and Verdasco, and the Monte-Carlo Rolex Masters over Dodig and Melo. Their 24-match winning streak was snapped by the Nestor and Zimonjić in the final of the Mutua Madrid Open. At the French Open, they suffered another surprising loss in the quarterfinals to Granollers and López. They reached their first Grand Slam final of the year at the Wimbledon Championships, but lost to Pospisil and Sock. At the US Open Series, after disappointing exits in their first events, they won the Western & Southern Open over Pospisil and Sock, avenging their loss at Wimbledon. They then captured the US Open against the Spanish team of Granollers and López, extending their streak to 10 consecutive years of at least winning one Grand Slam. They then captured the last two Masters events of the year, the Shanghai Rolex Masters over Benneteau and Roger-Vasselin and the BNP Paribas Masters over Matkowski and Melzer. This was the 13th consecutive time they qualified for the event.

On 9 September, Daniel Nestor and Nenad Zimonjić became the second team to qualify.

Daniel Nestor & Nenad Zimonjić rekindled their partnership in 2014. They began the year by winning the Apia International Sydney, defeating Bopanna and Qureshi. They followed it up with a semifinal showing at the Australian Open, losing to Butorac and Klaasen. They reached their second final of the year at the Dubai Tennis Championships, once again facing Bopanna and Qureshi, but this time they ended up in the losing side. They also lost their next final at Barcelona Open Banc Sabadell to lucky losers Huta Galung and Robert. They bounced back by winning back-to-back Masters titles: the Mutua Madrid Open over Bob and Mike Bryan and the Internazionali BNL d'Italia over Haase and López. However, at the French Open, they suffered a surprising loss in the quarterfinals to Draganja and Mergea. They also lost in the quarterfinal of Wimbledon to Paes and Štěpánek. At the US Open, they made an early exit, losing in the third round to Americans Lipsky and Ram. The pair was also successful with different partners, with Nestor winning the Brisbane International with Mariusz Fyrstenberg over Cabal and Farah and Zimonjić winning the Swiss Indoors Basel with Vasek Pospisil against Draganja and Kontinen. They also did well in mixed doubles, with Nestor winning the Australian Open with Kristina Mladenovic, defeating Mirza and Tecău, and Zimonjić winning Wimbledon with Samantha Stosur defeating Mirnyi and Chan and the final of the French Open with Julia Görges defeating Grönefeld and Rojer. This was their fourth finals appearance as a team, the 15th for Nestor, and the seventh for Zimonjić

On 8 October, Alexander Peya and Bruno Soares became the third team to qualify. This was their second year in the finals in a row, having reached the semifinals the previous year.

Alexander Peya & Bruno Soares continued their partnership from the previous year. They began the year reaching back-to-back finals, but losing in both at the Qatar ExxonMobil Open and Heineken Open to Berdych and Hájek and Knowle and Melo, respectively. They fell in the third round of the Australian Open to Llodra and Mahut. They reached their third final of the year at the BNP Paribas Open, but once again lost, this time to the world no. 1 team of Bob and Mike Bryan. In the grass season, they won their first title of the year at the Aegon Championships, defeating to Murray and Peers. The following week, they reached the final of Aegon International, losing to Huey and Inglot. At the Wimbledon Championships, they lost in the quarterfinals to eventual champion Pospisil and Sock. They reached their sixth final of the year at the International German Open, falling to Draganja and Mergea. They claimed their biggest title of the year at the Rogers Cup, defeating Dodig and Melo. At the final Grand Slam of the year, the US Open, they lost to Granollers and López in the quarterfinals. Soares also claimed the mixed doubles title at the US Open with Sania Mirza, defeating Spears and González.

On 9 October, Julien Benneteau and Édouard Roger-Vasselin became the fourth team to qualify.

Julien Benneteau and Édouard Roger-Vasselin began a new partnership at the start of 2014. They had good results, but failed to win a title until the Open 13, defeating Hanley and Marray in a match tie-break. They made their breakthrough at the French Open, when they defeated Granollers and López in the final, winning their first Grand Slam and becoming the first French team to win at Roland Garros since 1984. The pair also reached the final of the Shanghai Rolex Masters, losing to Bob and Mike Bryan. Bennneteau also reached the final of the China Open with Vasek Pospisil, losing to Rojer and Tecău. This was their maiden appearance in the season finale.

On 29 October, after the conclusion of the second-round matches in the BNP Paribas Masters, the teams Łukasz Kubot and Robert Lindstedt, Jean-Julien Rojer and Horia Tecău, and Marcel Granollers and Marc López took the next three spots.

Łukasz Kubot and Robert Lindstedt won only a single title during the year. They won the Australian Open, defeating Butorac and Klaasen. This was their first Grand Slam title as a pair and as individuals. They also reached the quarterfinals of the French Open, losing to Golubev and Groth. It was the third time Lindstedt had qualified Kubot's third appearance at the season finale. They qualified as the highest ranked Grand Slam champions between 8th and 20th position.

Jean-Julien Rojer and Horia Tecău had a breakthrough season, winning eight titles as a team, only behind Bob and Mike Bryan. They won their first title of the year at the PBZ Zagreb Indoors, defeating Marx and Mertiňák. They reached a final the following week at the ABN AMRO World Tennis Tournament, losing to Llodra and Mahut. During the European clay season they won the Grand Prix Hassan II and BRD Năstase Țiriac Trophy over Bednarek and Dlouhý and Fyrstenberg and Matkowski, respectively. In the grass season, they won the Topshelf Open, defeating González and Lipsky. They won their biggest title of the year at the Citi Open, defeating Groth and Paes. During the Asian swing, they won back-to-back titles at the Shenzhen Open and the China Open, beating the teams of Guccione and Groth and Benneteau and Pospisil, respectively. They won their eighth title of the year at the Valencia Open 500, defeating Anderson and Chardy. Tecău also reached the final of the Australian Open in mixed doubles with Sania Mirza, but lost to Mladenovic and Nestor. Despite their success, they failed to get past the third round of any Grand Slam. This is the third time they qualified, but first time as a team.

Marcel Granollers and Marc López teamed up for the fourth year in a row. The Spanish duo won only one title in the year, the Copa Claro, defeating Cuevas and Zeballos. However, they reached two Grand Slam finals in the year, the first at the French Open, losing to Benneteau and Roger-Vasselin and the US Open losing to Bob and Mike Bryan. This was their third appearance at the tour finals, having won the event on their debut in 2012.

== Head-to-head ==
2014 ATP World Tour Finals – Singles

		Djokovic	Federer	Wawrinka	Nishikori	Murray	Berdych	Raonic	Čilić	Overall	YTD W–L
1	Novak Djokovic (SRB)		17–19	16–3	3–2	15–8	17–2	4–0	11–0	83–34	61–8
2	Roger Federer (SUI)	19–17		15–2	3–2	12–11	12–6	7–1	5–1	73–40	72–11
3	Stan Wawrinka (SUI)	3–16	2–15		2–1	6–8	10–5	3–0	8–2	34–47	38–17
4	Kei Nishikori (JPN)	2–3	2–3	1–2		1–3	3–1	4–1	5–3	18–16	54–14
5	Andy Murray (GBR)	8–15	11–12	8–6	3–1		4–6	2–3	10–2	46–45	59–20
6	Tomáš Berdych (CZE)	2–17	6–12	5–10	1–3	6–4		1–3	6–4	27–53	55–22
7	Milos Raonic (CAN)	0–4	1–7	0–3	1–4	3–2	3–1		1–1	9–22	49–20
8	Marin Čilić (CRO)	0–11	1–5	2–8	3–5	2–10	4–6	1–1		13–46	54–21

2014 ATP World Tour Finals – Doubles

		Bryan; Bryan	Nestor; Zimonjić	Peya; Soares	Benneteau; Roger-Vasselin	Rojer; Tecău	Granollers; López	Dodig; Melo	Kubot; Lindstedt	Overall	YTD W–L
1	Bob Bryan (USA) / Mike Bryan (USA)		7–11	7–1	3–0	3–0	6–2	4–2	2–0	32–16	60–11
2	Daniel Nestor (CAN) / Nenad Zimonjić (SRB)	11–7		1–2	2–1	1–0	1–0	1–0	0–0	17–10	41–16
3	Alexander Peya (AUT) / Bruno Soares (BRA)	1–7	2–1		1–1	1–1	4–2	4–0	0–0	13–12	42–24
4	Julien Benneteau (FRA) / Édouard Roger-Vasselin (FRA)	0–3	1–2	1–1		1–1	2–0	0–0	0–0	5–7	32–15
5	Jean-Julien Rojer (NED) / Horia Tecău (ROU)	0–3	0–1	1–1	1–1		1–0	0–0	1–0	4–6	48–20
6	Marcel Granollers (ESP) / Marc López (ESP)	2–6	0–1	2–4	0–2	0–1		1–2	0–1	5–17	29–16
7	Ivan Dodig (CRO) / Marcelo Melo (BRA)	2–4	0–1	0–4	0–0	0–0	2–1		1–2	5–12	27–19
8	Łukasz Kubot (POL) / Robert Lindstedt (SWE)	0–2	0–0	0–0	0–0	0–1	1–0	2–1		3–4	17–16

== Groupings ==
=== Singles ===
Group A	Group B
Novak Djokovic	Roger Federer
Stan Wawrinka	Kei Nishikori
Tomáš Berdych	Andy Murray
Marin Čilić	Milos Raonic

=== Doubles ===
Group A	Group B
Bob Bryan/Mike Bryan	Daniel Nestor/Nenad Zimonjić
Alexander Peya/Bruno Soares	Julien Benneteau/Édouard Roger-Vasselin
Jean-Julien Rojer/Horia Tecău	Marcel Granollers/Marc López
Łukasz Kubot/Robert Lindstedt	Ivan Dodig/Marcelo Melo

== Day-by-day summary ==
=== Day 1 (9 November) ===
Matches on The O2 Arena
Stage	Winner	Loser	Score
Doubles – Group B	Marcel Granollers (ESP); Marc López (ESP) [6]	Julien Benneteau (FRA); Édouard Roger-Vasselin (FRA) [4]	6–4, 6–4
Singles – Group B	Kei Nishikori (JPN) [4]	Andy Murray (GBR) [5]	6–4, 6–4
Doubles – Group B	Ivan Dodig (CRO); Marcelo Melo (BRA) [7]	Daniel Nestor (CAN); Nenad Zimonjić (SRB) [2]	6–3, 7–5
Singles – Group B	Roger Federer (SUI) [2]	Milos Raonic (CAN) [7]	6–1, 7–6^{(7–0)}

=== Day 2 (10 November) ===
Matches on The O2 Arena
Stage	Winner	Loser	Score
Doubles – Group A	Alexander Peya (AUT); Bruno Soares (BRA) [3]	Jean-Julien Rojer (NED); Horia Tecău (ROU) [5]	6–3, 3–6, [12–10]
Singles – Group A	Stan Wawrinka (SUI) [3]	Tomáš Berdych (CZE) [6]	6–1, 6–1
Doubles – Group A	Łukasz Kubot (POL); Robert Lindstedt (SWE) [8]	Bob Bryan (USA); Mike Bryan (USA) [1]	7–6^{(7–3)}, 6–3
Singles – Group A	Novak Djokovic (SRB) [1]	Marin Čilić (CRO) [8]	6–1, 6–1

=== Day 3 (11 November) ===
Matches on The O2 Arena
Stage	Winner	Loser	Score
Doubles – Group B	Julien Benneteau (FRA); Édouard Roger-Vasselin (FRA) [4]	Daniel Nestor (CAN); Nenad Zimonjić (SRB) [2]	6–4, 5–7, [10–4]
Singles – Group B	Roger Federer (SUI) [2]	Kei Nishikori (JPN) [4]	6–3, 6–2
Doubles – Group B	Ivan Dodig (CRO); Marcelo Melo (BRA) [7]	Marcel Granollers (ESP); Marc López (ESP) [6]	7–6^{(7–5)}, 7–6^{(14–12)}
Singles – Group B	Andy Murray (GBR) [5]	Milos Raonic (CAN) [7]	6–3, 7–5

=== Day 4 (12 November) ===
Matches on The O2 Arena
Stage	Winner	Loser	Score
Doubles – Group A	Bob Bryan (USA); Mike Bryan (USA) [1]	Jean-Julien Rojer (NED); Horia Tecău (ROU) [5]	6–7^{(4–7)}, 6–3, [10–6]
Singles – Group A	Tomáš Berdych (CZE) [6]	Marin Čilić (CRO) [8]	6–3, 6–1
Doubles – Group A	Łukasz Kubot (POL); Robert Lindstedt (SWE) [8]	Alexander Peya (AUT); Bruno Soares (BRA) [3]	6–4, 3–6, [10–6]
Singles – Group A	Novak Djokovic (SRB) [1]	Stan Wawrinka (SUI) [3]	6−3, 6−0

=== Day 5 (13 November) ===
Matches on The O2 Arena
Stage	Winner	Loser	Score
Doubles – Group B	Daniel Nestor (CAN); Nenad Zimonjić (SRB) [2]	Marcel Granollers (ESP); Marc López (ESP) [6]	6–7^{(5–7)}, 6–3, [11–9]
Singles – Group B	Kei Nishikori (JPN) [4]	David Ferrer (ESP) [9/ALT]	4–6, 6–4, 6–1
Doubles – Group B	Julien Benneteau (FRA); Édouard Roger-Vasselin (FRA) [4]	Ivan Dodig (CRO); Marcelo Melo (BRA) [7]	4–6, 6–2, [10–8]
Singles – Group B	Roger Federer (SUI) [2]	Andy Murray (GBR) [5]	6–0, 6–1

=== Day 6 (14 November) ===
Matches on The O2 Arena
Stage	Winner	Loser	Score
Doubles – Group A	Łukasz Kubot (POL); Robert Lindstedt (SWE) [8]	Jean-Julien Rojer (NED); Horia Tecău (ROU) [5]	6−4, 7−6^{(7−4)}
Singles – Group A	Novak Djokovic (SRB) [1]	Tomáš Berdych (CZE) [6]	6−2, 6−2
Doubles – Group A	Bob Bryan (USA); Mike Bryan (USA) [1]	Alexander Peya (AUT); Bruno Soares (BRA) [3]	7−6^{(7−3)}, 7−6^{(7−2)}
Singles – Group A	Stan Wawrinka (SUI) [4]	Marin Čilić (CRO) [8]	6−3, 4−6, 6−3

=== Day 7 (15 November) ===
Matches on The O2 Arena
Stage	Winner	Loser	Score
Doubles – Semifinals	Ivan Dodig (CRO); Marcelo Melo (BRA) [7]	Łukasz Kubot (POL); Robert Lindstedt (SWE) [8]	4−6, 6−4, [10−6]
Singles – Semifinals	Novak Djokovic (SRB) [1]	Kei Nishikori (JPN) [4]	6−1, 3−6, 6−0
Doubles – Semifinals	Bob Bryan (USA); Mike Bryan (USA) [1]	Julien Benneteau (FRA); Édouard Roger-Vasselin (FRA) [4]	6−0, 6−3
Singles – Semifinals	Roger Federer (SUI) [2]	Stan Wawrinka (SUI) [3]	4–6, 7–5, 7–6^{(8–6)}

=== Day 8 (16 November) ===
Matches on The O2 Arena
Stage	Winner	Loser	Score
Doubles – Final	Bob Bryan (USA); Mike Bryan (USA) [1]	Ivan Dodig (CRO); Marcelo Melo (BRA) [7]	6–7^{(5–7)}, 6–2, [10–7]
Singles – Final	Novak Djokovic (SRB) [1]	Roger Federer (SUI) [2]	w/o
Singles – Exhibition	Novak Djokovic (SRB)	Andy Murray (GBR)	8−5
Doubles – Exhibition	John McEnroe (USA); Andy Murray (GBR)	Tim Henman (GBR); Pat Cash (AUS)	8−6

== See also ==
- ATP rankings
- 2014 WTA Finals
- 2014 ATP Challenger Tour Finals
