= 2014 ATP World Tour Finals – Singles =

Singles
- 2014 ATP World Tour Finals

Final
- Champion: (Serbia) Novak Djokovic
- Runner-up: (Switzerland) Roger Federer
- Score: Walkover

Events
Singles	Doubles
← 2013 ·	ATP World Tour Finals	· 2015 →

Two-time defending champion Novak Djokovic won the singles tennis title at the 2014 ATP Finals after Roger Federer withdrew from the final. It marked the first walkover in a final in the 45-year history of the tournament. It was Djokovic's fourth Tour Finals title.

Kei Nishikori, Milos Raonic and Marin Čilić made their debuts at the event.

== Seeds ==
1. (Serbia) Novak Djokovic (champion)
2. (Switzerland) Roger Federer (final, withdrew due to back injury)
3. (Switzerland) Stan Wawrinka (semifinals)
4. (Japan) Kei Nishikori (semifinals)

5. (United Kingdom) Andy Murray (round robin)
6. (Czech Republic) Tomáš Berdych (round robin)
7. (Canada) Milos Raonic (round robin, withdrew because of a thigh injury)
8. (Croatia) Marin Čilić (round robin)

== Alternates ==
1. (Spain) David Ferrer (replaced Raonic, round robin)
2. (Spain) Feliciano López (Did not play)

== Draw ==
=== Key ===
- Q = Qualifier
- WC = Wild card
- LL = Lucky loser
- Alt = Alternate
- SE = Special exempt
- PR = Protected ranking
- ITF = ITF entry
- JE = Junior exempt
- w/o = Walkover
- r = Retired
- d = Defaulted
- SR = Special ranking

=== Finals ===
Semifinals
1	(Serbia) Novak Djokovic	6	3	6
4	(Japan) Kei Nishikori	1	6	0
2	(Switzerland) Roger Federer	4	7	7^{8}
3	(Switzerland) Stan Wawrinka	6	5	6^{6}

Final
1	(Serbia) Novak Djokovic	w/o
2	(Switzerland) Roger Federer

=== Group A ===
		(Serbia) Djokovic	(Switzerland) Wawrinka	(Czech Republic) Berdych	(Croatia) Čilić	RR W–L	Set W–L	Game W–L	Standings
1	(Serbia) Novak Djokovic		6–3, 6–0	6–2, 6–2	6–1, 6–1	3–0	6–0 (100%)	36–9 (80.0%)	1
3	(Switzerland) Stan Wawrinka	3–6, 0–6		6–1, 6–1	6–3, 4–6, 6–3	2–1	4–3 (57.1%)	31–26 (54.4%)	2
6	(Czech Republic) Tomáš Berdych	2–6, 2–6	1–6, 1–6		6–3, 6–1	1–2	2–4 (33.3%)	18–28 (39.1%)	3
8	(Croatia) Marin Čilić	1–6, 1–6	3–6, 6–4, 3–6	3–6, 1–6		0–3	1–6 (14.3%)	18–40 (31.0%)	4

=== Group B ===
		(Switzerland) Federer	(Japan) Nishikori	(United Kingdom) Murray	(Canada) Raonic (Spain) Ferrer	RR W–L	Set W–L	Game W–L	Standings
2	(Switzerland) Roger Federer		6–3, 6–2	6–0, 6–1	6–1, 7–6^{(7–0)} (w/ Raonic)	3–0	6–0 (100%)	37–13 (74.0%)	1
4	(Japan) Kei Nishikori	3–6, 2–6		6–4, 6–4	4–6, 6–4, 6–1 (w/ Ferrer)	2–1	4–3 (57.1%)	33–31 (51.6%)	2
5	(United Kingdom) Andy Murray	0–6, 1–6	4–6, 4–6		6–3, 7–5 (w/ Raonic)	1–2	2–4 (33.3%)	22–32 (40.7%)	3
7; 9	(Canada) Milos Raonic (Spain) David Ferrer	1–6, 6–7^{(0–7)} (w/ Raonic)	6–4, 4–6, 1–6 (w/ Ferrer)	3–6, 5–7 (w/ Raonic)		0–2; 0–1	0–4 (0.0%); 1–2 (33.3%)	15–26 (36.6%); 11–16 (40.7%)	X 4

Standings are determined by: 1. number of wins; 2. number of matches; 3. in two-player ties, head-to-head records; 4. in three-player ties, percentage of sets won, or of games won, then head-to-head records; 5) ATP rankings.
