= 2014 Barcelona Open Banc Sabadell – Singles =

Singles
- 2014 Barcelona Open Banc Sabadell

Final
- Champion: (Japan) Kei Nishikori
- Runner-up: (Colombia) Santiago Giraldo
- Score: 6–2, 6–2

Details
- Draw: 48 (6 Q / 4 WC )
- Seeds: 16

Events
Singles	Doubles
← 2013 ·	Barcelona Open	· 2015 →

Kei Nishikori defeated Santiago Giraldo in the final, 6–2, 6–2, to win the singles title at the 2014 Barcelona Open. He became the first non-Spanish player to win the tournament since 2002.

Rafael Nadal was the three-time defending champion, but lost to Nicolás Almagro in the quarterfinals, snapping a 41-match winning streak at the event and his first loss in Barcelona since 2003.

== Seeds ==
All seeds receive a bye into the second round.

1. (Spain) Rafael Nadal (quarterfinals)
2. (Spain) David Ferrer (second round)
3. (Italy) Fabio Fognini (second round, retired because of fatigue)
4. (Japan) Kei Nishikori (champion)
5. (Spain) Tommy Robredo (third round)
6. (Spain) Nicolás Almagro (semifinals)
7. (Poland) Jerzy Janowicz (second round)
8. (Ukraine) Alexandr Dolgopolov (second round)

9. (Latvia) Ernests Gulbis (semifinals)
10. (Germany) Philipp Kohlschreiber (quarterfinals, retired)
11. (Spain) Fernando Verdasco (third round)
12. (Croatia) Marin Čilić (quarterfinals)
13. (Spain) Feliciano López (second round)
14. (Spain) Marcel Granollers (second round)
15. (Russia) Dmitry Tursunov (second round)
16. (France) Benoît Paire (second round, retired)

Click on the seed number of a player to go to their draw section.

== Draw ==
=== Key ===
- Q = Qualifier
- WC = Wild card
- LL = Lucky loser
- Alt = Alternate
- SE = Special exempt
- PR = Protected ranking
- ITF = ITF entry
- JE = Junior exempt
- w/o = Walkover
- r = Retired
- d = Defaulted
- SR = Special ranking

=== Finals ===
Quarterfinals
1	(Spain) Rafael Nadal	6	6^{5}	4
6	(Spain) Nicolás Almagro	2	7^{7}	6
(Colombia) Santiago Giraldo	6	4
10	(Germany) Philipp Kohlschreiber	4	3^{r}
12	(Croatia) Marin Čilić	1	3
4	(Japan) Kei Nishikori	6	6
9	(Latvia) Ernests Gulbis	6	6
(Russia) Teymuraz Gabashvili	1	4

Semifinals
6	(Spain) Nicolás Almagro	5	3
(Colombia) Santiago Giraldo	7	6
4	(Japan) Kei Nishikori	6	6
9	(Latvia) Ernests Gulbis	2	4

Final
(Colombia) Santiago Giraldo	2	2
4	(Japan) Kei Nishikori	6	6

=== Top half ===
==== Section 1 ====
First round
(Spain) A Ramos	6	6
(Russia) N Davydenko	4	4
(Croatia) I Dodig	6	6^{5}	6
WC	(Argentina) F Argüello	3	7^{7}	2
(France) K de Schepper	6	7
Q	(Turkey) M İlhan	3	5
(Slovakia) M Kližan	6	6
(India) S Devvarman	2	4

Second round
1	(Spain) R Nadal	7^{7}	6
(Spain) A Ramos	6^{2}	4
(Croatia) I Dodig	6	6
13	(Spain) F López	1	4
11	(Spain) F Verdasco	6	6
(France) K de Schepper	4	3
(Slovakia) M Kližan	5	6^{4}
6	(Spain) N Almagro	7	7^{7}

Third round
1	(Spain) R Nadal	6	6
(Croatia) I Dodig	3	3
11	(Spain) F Verdasco	3	3
6	(Spain) N Almagro	6	6

Quarterfinals
1	(Spain) R Nadal	6	6^{5}	4
6	(Spain) N Almagro	2	7^{7}	6

==== Section 2 ====
First round
(Colombia) S Giraldo	6	6
(Netherlands) I Sijsling	4	2
(Czech Republic) R Štěpánek	4	4
Q	(Austria) D Thiem	6	6
Q	(Germany) A Beck	2	2
(France) É Roger-Vasselin	6	6
(Kazakhstan) M Kukushkin	6^{5}	6	3
(Austria) J Melzer	7^{7}	3	6

Second round
3	(Italy) F Fognini	0	0^{r}
(Colombia) S Giraldo	6	4
Q	(Austria) D Thiem	3	6	6
14	(Spain) M Granollers	6	3	2
10	(Germany) P Kohlschreiber	7^{7}	6
(France) É Roger-Vasselin	6^{4}	2
(Austria) J Melzer	6	7^{7}
7	(Poland) J Janowicz	4	6^{1}

Third round
(Colombia) S Giraldo	4	6	7
Q	(Austria) D Thiem	6	4	5
10	(Germany) P Kohlschreiber	7	6
(Austria) J Melzer	5	3

Quarterfinals
(Colombia) S Giraldo	6	4
10	(Germany) P Kohlschreiber	4	3^{r}

=== Bottom half ===
==== Section 3 ====
First round
(Portugal) J Sousa	3	2
(Australia) M Matosevic	6	6
Q	(Russia) A Kuznetsov	2	6	6
(Spain) P Carreño Busta	6	1	2
Q	(Italy) M Viola	4	3
(Kazakhstan) A Golubev	6	6
(Poland) Ł Kubot	1	0
(Spain) R Bautista Agut	6	6

Second round
5	(Spain) T Robredo	6	6
(Australia) M Matosevic	3	4
Q	(Russia) A Kuznetsov	1	6^{2}
12	(Croatia) M Čilić	6	7^{7}
16	(France) B Paire	4	1^{r}
(Kazakhstan) A Golubev	6	5
(Spain) R Bautista Agut	1	6	3
4	(Japan) K Nishikori	6	4	6

Third round
5	(Spain) T Robredo	5	7^{7}	6^{5}
12	(Croatia) M Čilić	7	6^{3}	7^{7}
(Kazakhstan) A Golubev	0	4
4	(Japan) K Nishikori	6	6

Quarterfinals
12	(Croatia) M Čilić	1	3
4	(Japan) K Nishikori	6	6

==== Section 4 ====
First round
(Spain) A Montañés	7^{7}	6
Q	(Spain) M López	6^{4}	2
WC	(Spain) D Gimeno Traver	6	7
WC	(Spain) R Carballés Baena	3	5
WC	(Spain) I Cervantes	3	6	6
(Kazakhstan) O Nedovyesov	6	2	4
(Russia) T Gabashvili	6	6
(Poland) M Przysiężny	3	4

Second round
8	(Ukraine) A Dolgopolov	6^{5}	3
(Spain) A Montañés	7^{7}	6
WC	(Spain) D Gimeno Traver	5	6^{1}
9	(Latvia) E Gulbis	7	7^{7}
15	(Russia) D Tursunov	7	0	3
WC	(Spain) I Cervantes	5	6	6
(Russia) T Gabashvili	6	6
2	(Spain) D Ferrer	4	2

Third round
(Spain) A Montañés	5	1
9	(Latvia) E Gulbis	7	6
WC	(Spain) I Cervantes	4	2
(Russia) T Gabashvili	6	6

Quarterfinals
9	(Latvia) E Gulbis	6	6
(Russia) T Gabashvili	1	4

== Qualifying ==
=== Seeds ===
1. (Austria) Dominic Thiem (qualified)
2. (France) Stéphane Robert (qualifying competition)
3. (Russia) Evgeny Donskoy (qualifying competition)
4. (Germany) Peter Gojowczyk (first round, retired)
5. (Russia) Andrey Kuznetsov (qualified)
6. (Netherlands) Jesse Huta Galung (qualifying competition)
7. (Germany) Andreas Beck (qualified)
8. (Turkey) Marsel İlhan (qualified)
9. (Italy) Thomas Fabbiano (first round)
10. (Croatia) Ante Pavić (first round)
11. (Hungary) Márton Fucsovics (qualifying competition)
12. (Italy) Matteo Viola (qualified)

=== Qualifiers ===
1. (Austria) Dominic Thiem
2. (Germany) Andreas Beck
3. (Italy) Matteo Viola
4. (Spain) Marc López
5. (Russia) Andrey Kuznetsov
6. (Turkey) Marsel İlhan

=== Qualifying draw ===
==== First qualifier ====
First round
1	(Austria) Dominic Thiem	6	6
(Canada) Steven Diez	3	3
Alt	(Netherlands) Boy Westerhof	4	6	3
11	(Hungary) Márton Fucsovics	6	3	6

Qualifying competition
1	(Austria) Dominic Thiem	7	6
11	(Hungary) Márton Fucsovics	5	3

==== Second qualifier ====
First round
2	(France) Stéphane Robert	6	7
(Spain) Enrique López Pérez	4	5
(Italy) Flavio Cipolla	4	4
7	(Germany) Andreas Beck	6	6

Qualifying competition
2	(France) Stéphane Robert	6	4	5
7	(Germany) Andreas Beck	4	6	7

==== Third qualifier ====
First round
3	(Russia) Evgeny Donskoy	6^{3}	6	6
(Spain) Jordi Samper-Montana	7^{7}	3	3
(Spain) Gerard Granollers	4	2
12	(Italy) Matteo Viola	6	6

Qualifying competition
3	(Russia) Evgeny Donskoy	6^{5}	1
12	(Italy) Matteo Viola	7^{7}	6

==== Fourth qualifier ====
First round
4	(Germany) Peter Gojowczyk	7^{7}	2	1^{r}
WC	(Spain) Marc López	6^{4}	6	4
(Spain) José Checa-Calvo	6	3	7^{10}
10	(Croatia) Ante Pavić	0	6	6^{8}

Qualifying competition
WC	(Spain) Marc López	7	6
(Spain) José Checa-Calvo	5	2

==== Fifth qualifier ====
First round
5	(Russia) Andrey Kuznetsov	7^{8}	6
WC	(Spain) Oriol Roca Batalla	6^{6}	2
(Italy) Lorenzo Giustino	2	6	6
9	(Italy) Thomas Fabbiano	6	3	1

Qualifying competition
5	(Russia) Andrey Kuznetsov	6	7
(Italy) Lorenzo Giustino	4	5

==== Sixth qualifier ====
First round
6	(Netherlands) Jesse Huta Galung	6	6
WC	(Spain) Pol Toledo Bagué	4	1
WC	(Spain) Juan Lizariturry	2	6	4
8	(Turkey) Marsel İlhan	6	2	6

Qualifying competition
6	(Netherlands) Jesse Huta Galung	3	3
8	(Turkey) Marsel İlhan	6	6
