= 2014 Swiss Indoors =

- Date: 20–26 October
- Edition: 45th
- Category: ATP World Tour 500
- Draw: 32S / 16D
- Prize money: €1,458,610
- Surface: Hard
- Location: Basel, Switzerland
- Venue: St. Jakobshalle

Champions

Singles
- (Switzerland) Roger Federer

Doubles
- (Canada) Vasek Pospisil / (Serbia) Nenad Zimonjić
← 2013 ·	Swiss Indoors	· 2015 →

The 2014 Swiss Indoors was a men's tennis tournament played on indoor hard courts. It was the 45th edition of the event known as the Swiss Indoors, and part of the 500 series of the 2014 ATP World Tour. It was held at the St. Jakobshalle in Basel, Switzerland, from 20 October through 26 October 2014. First-seeded Roger Federer won the singles title.

== Finals ==
=== Singles ===
- (Switzerland) Roger Federer defeated (Belgium) David Goffin, 6–2, 6–2

=== Doubles ===
- (Canada) Vasek Pospisil / (Serbia) Nenad Zimonjić defeated (Croatia) Marin Draganja / (Finland) Henri Kontinen, 7–6^{(15–13)}, 1–6, [10–5]

== Points and prize money ==
=== Point distribution ===
Event	W	F	SF	QF	Round of 16	Round of 32	Q	Q2	Q1
Singles	500	300	180	90	45	0	20	10	0
Doubles	500	300	180	90	0	—	—	—	—

=== Prize money ===
Event	W	F	SF	QF	Round of 16	Round of 32	Q2	Q1
Singles	€352,355	€158,860	€75,250	€36,310	€18,515	€10,180	€1,145	€635
Doubles	€104,090	€46,960	€22,140	€10,700	€5,500	—	—	—

== Singles main-draw entrants ==
=== Seeds ===
Country	Player	Rank^{1}	Seed
SUI	Roger Federer	2	1
ESP	Rafael Nadal	3	2
SUI	Stanislas Wawrinka	4	3
CAN	Milos Raonic	9	4
BUL	Grigor Dimitrov	10	5
LAT	Ernests Gulbis	13	6
BEL	David Goffin	28	7
CRO	Ivo Karlović	30	8

- Rankings are as of October 13, 2014

=== Other entrants ===
The following players received wildcards into the singles main draw:

- (Switzerland) Marco Chiudinelli
- (Croatia) Borna Ćorić
- (Germany) Alexander Zverev

The following players received entry from the qualifying draw:

- (Italy) Simone Bolelli
- (France) Kenny de Schepper
- (Portugal) Gastão Elias
- (France) Pierre-Hugues Herbert

=== Withdrawals ===
Before the tournament

- (France) Julien Benneteau
- (Argentina) Juan Martín del Potro
- (Australia) Nick Kyrgios

=== Retirements ===
- (Kazakhstan) Mikhail Kukushkin (shoulder injury)

== Doubles main-draw entrants ==
=== Seeds ===
Country	Player	Country	Player	Rank^{1}	Seed
CRO	Ivan Dodig	BRA	Marcelo Melo	19	1
CAN	Vasek Pospisil	SRB	Nenad Zimonjić	21	2
IND	Rohan Bopanna	CAN	Daniel Nestor	31	3
POL	Łukasz Kubot	SWE	Robert Lindstedt	40	4

- Rankings are as of October 13, 2014

=== Other entrants ===
The following pairs received wildcards into the doubles main draw:

- (Switzerland) Marco Chiudinelli / (Switzerland) Michael Lammer
- (Switzerland) Sandro Ehrat / (Switzerland) Henri Laaksonen

The following pair received entry from the qualifying draw:

- (United Kingdom) Colin Fleming / (United Kingdom) Jonathan Marray
