= 2014 Aegon Championships =

- Date: 9–15 June
- Edition: 112th
- Category: ATP World Tour 250 series
- Draw: 56S / 24D
- Prize money: €711,010
- Surface: Grass
- Location: London, United Kingdom
- Venue: Queen's Club

Champions

Singles
- (Bulgaria) Grigor Dimitrov

Doubles
- (Austria) Alexander Peya / (Brazil) Bruno Soares
- Queen's Club Championships

The 2014 Aegon Championships (also known traditionally as the Queen's Club Championships) was a men's tennis tournament played on outdoor grass courts. It was the 112th edition of those championships and was part of the ATP World Tour 250 series of the 2014 ATP World Tour. It took place at the Queen's Club in London, United Kingdom between 9 June and 15 June 2014. The singles title was won by fourth-seeded Grigor Dimitrov.

== Finals ==
=== Singles ===
- (Bulgaria) Grigor Dimitrov defeated (Spain) Feliciano López, 6–7^{(8–10)}, 7–6^{(7–1)}, 7–6^{(8–6)}

=== Doubles ===
- (Austria) Alexander Peya / (Brazil) Bruno Soares defeated (United Kingdom) Jamie Murray / (Australia) John Peers, 4–6, 7–6^{(7–4)}, [10–4]

== Points and prize money ==
=== Point distribution ===
Event	W	F	SF	QF	Round of 16	Round of 32	Round of 64	Q	Q3	Q2	Q1
Singles	250	150	90	45	20	10	0	5	3	0	0
Doubles	250	150	90	45	20	0	—N/a	—N/a	—N/a	—N/a	—N/a

=== Prize money ===
Event	W	F	SF	QF	Round of 16	Round of 32	Round of 64	Q3	Q2	Q1
Singles	€90,100	€51,300	€29,610	€17,430	€10,160	€6,175	€3,755	€1,180	€565	—N/a
Doubles *	€33,310	€17,730	€9,670	€5,700	€3,440	€2,090	—N/a	—N/a	—N/a	—N/a

_{* per team}

== Singles main draw entrants ==
=== Seeds ===
Country	Player	Rank^{1}	Seed
SUI	Stan Wawrinka	3	1
CZE	Tomáš Berdych	6	2
GBR	Andy Murray	8	3
BUL	Grigor Dimitrov	12	4
FRA	Jo-Wilfried Tsonga	14	5
LAT	Ernests Gulbis	17	6
RSA	Kevin Anderson	20	7
UKR	Alexandr Dolgopolov	21	8
CRO	Marin Čilić	26	9
ESP	Feliciano López	27	10
CAN	Vasek Pospisil	31	11
RUS	Dmitry Tursunov	32	12
FRA	Nicolas Mahut	40	13
FRA	Jérémy Chardy	42	14
CZE	Radek Štěpánek	43	15
FRA	Julien Benneteau	45	16

- Rankings are as of May 26, 2014.

=== Other entrants ===
The following players received wildcards into the singles main draw:

- (Cyprus) Marcos Baghdatis
- (United Kingdom) Daniel Cox
- (United Kingdom) Daniel Evans
- (United Kingdom) James Ward
- (Switzerland) Stan Wawrinka

The following players received entry from the qualifying draw:

- (Germany) Daniel Brands
- (Australia) James Duckworth
- (Uzbekistan) Farrukh Dustov
- (Turkey) Marsel İlhan

=== Withdrawals ===
Before the tournament

- (Croatia) Ivan Dodig → replaced by (Slovenia) Aljaž Bedene
- (Colombia) Alejandro González → replaced by (United States) Denis Kudla
- (United States) Jack Sock → replaced by (India) Somdev Devvarman

During the tournament

- (Ukraine) Alexandr Dolgopolov

=== Retirements ===
- (Cyprus) Marcos Baghdatis
- (Finland) Jarkko Nieminen

== Doubles main draw entrants ==
=== Seeds ===
Country	Player	Country	Player	Rank^{1}	Seed
USA	Bob Bryan	USA	Mike Bryan	2	1
AUT	Alexander Peya	BRA	Bruno Soares	6	2
CAN	Daniel Nestor	SRB	Nenad Zimonjić	15	3
FRA	Michaël Llodra	FRA	Nicolas Mahut	29	4
IND	Rohan Bopanna	PAK	Aisam-ul-Haq Qureshi	35	5
PHI	Treat Huey	GBR	Dominic Inglot	43	6
FRA	Julien Benneteau	FRA	Édouard Roger-Vasselin	50	7
GBR	Colin Fleming	POL	Marcin Matkowski	57	8

- Rankings are as of May 26, 2014.

=== Other entrants ===
The following pairs received wildcards into the doubles main draw:

- (United Kingdom) Daniel Evans / (United Kingdom) James Ward
- (United Kingdom) Ken Skupski / (United Kingdom) Neal Skupski

=== Retirements ===
- (Ukraine) Alexandr Dolgopolov (right leg injury)
