= 2014 Aegon Championships – Singles =

Singles
- 2014 Aegon Championships

Final
- Champion: (Bulgaria) Grigor Dimitrov
- Runner-up: (Spain) Feliciano López
- Score: 6–7^{(8–10)}, 7–6^{(7–1)}, 7–6^{(8–6)}

Details
- Draw: 56
- Seeds: 16

Events
| Singles | Doubles |
- Queen's Club Championships

Grigor Dimitrov defeated Feliciano López in the final, 6–7^{(8–10)}, 7–6^{(7–1)}, 7–6^{(8–6)} to win the singles title at the 2014 Queen's Club Championships. He saved a championship point in the second set en route to the title, his first on a grass court.

Andy Murray was the defending champion, but lost in the third round to Radek Štěpánek.

== Seeds ==
The top eight seeds receive a bye into the second round.

1. (Switzerland) Stan Wawrinka (semifinals)
2. (Czech Republic) Tomáš Berdych (quarterfinals)
3. (United Kingdom) Andy Murray (third round)
4. (Bulgaria) Grigor Dimitrov (champion)
5. (France) Jo-Wilfried Tsonga (third round)
6. (Latvia) Ernests Gulbis (second round)
7. (South Africa) Kevin Anderson (quarterfinals)
8. (Ukraine) Alexandr Dolgopolov (quarterfinals, withdrew because of a right thigh injury)
9. (Croatia) Marin Čilić (first round)
10. (Spain) Feliciano López (final)
11. (Canada) Vasek Pospisil (second round)
12. (Russia) Dmitry Tursunov (second round)
13. (France) Nicolas Mahut (second round)
14. (France) Jérémy Chardy (first round)
15. (Czech Republic) Radek Štěpánek (semifinals)
16. (France) Julien Benneteau (first round)

Click on the seed number of a player to go to their draw section.

== Draw ==
Key

- Q = Qualifier
- WC = Wild card
- LL = Lucky loser
- Alt = Alternate
- ITF = ITF entry
- PR = Protected ranking
- SR = Special ranking
- SE = Special exempt
- JE = Junior exempt
- JR = Junior Accelerator Programme entrant
- CO = College Accelerator Programme entrant
- NG = Next Gen Accelerator Program entrant
- w/o = Walkover
- r = Retired
- d = Defaulted

=== Finals ===
Quarterfinals
1/WC | (Switzerland) Stan Wawrinka | 7 | 6
(Australia) Marinko Matosevic | 5 | 3
4 | (Bulgaria) Grigor Dimitrov | w/o
8 | (Ukraine) Alexandr Dolgopolov
7 | (South Africa) Kevin Anderson | 6 | 3 | 2
15 | (Czech Republic) Radek Štěpánek | 1 | 6 | 6
10 | (Spain) Feliciano López | 6 | 7^{9}
2 | (Czech Republic) Tomáš Berdych | 4 | 6^{7}

Semifinals
1/WC | (Switzerland) Stan Wawrinka | 2 | 4
4 | (Bulgaria) Grigor Dimitrov | 6 | 6
15 | (Czech Republic) Radek Štěpánek | 6^{7} | 4
10 | (Spain) Feliciano López | 7^{9} | 6

Final
4 | (Bulgaria) Grigor Dimitrov | 6^{8} | 7^{7} | 7^{8}
10 | (Spain) Feliciano López | 7^{10} | 6^{1} | 6^{6}

=== Top half ===
==== Section 1 ====
First round
WC | (Cyprus) M Baghdatis | 6^{6} | 6 | 6
(United States) B Klahn | 7^{8} | 2 | 1
(United States) M Russell | 6 | 3 | 1
(United States) D Kudla | 4 | 6 | 6
(United States) S Querrey | 6^{4} | 7^{7} | 7^{7}
14 | (France) J Chardy | 7^{7} | 6^{4} | 6^{5}
9 | (Croatia) M Čilić | 4 | 4
(Australia) M Matosevic | 6 | 6
(Australia) M Ebden | 6^{10} | 7 | 4
(Slovakia) L Lacko | 7^{12} | 5 | 6
(Belgium) D Goffin | 6 | 6
(Austria) D Thiem | 4 | 2

Second round
1/WC | (Switzerland) S Wawrinka | 3
WC | (Cyprus) M Baghdatis | 2^{r}
(United States) D Kudla | 4 | 3
(United States) S Querrey | 6 | 6
(Australia) M Matosevic | 7^{7} | 6
(Slovakia) L Lacko | 6^{3} | 3
(Belgium) D Goffin | 6^{5} | 2
5 | (France) J-W Tsonga | 7^{7} | 6

Third round
1/WC | (Switzerland) S Wawrinka | 6 | 6
(United States) S Querrey | 2 | 2
(Australia) M Matosevic | 6 | 6
5 | (France) J-W Tsonga | 2 | 4

Quarterfinals
1/WC | (Switzerland) S Wawrinka | 7 | 6
(Australia) M Matosevic | 5 | 3

==== Section 2 ====
First round
WC | (United Kingdom) J Ward | 7 | 6
(Slovenia) B Rola | 5 | 4
(France) É Roger-Vasselin | 6 | 6^{9} | 6
(Russia) E Donskoy | 3 | 7^{11} | 1
Q | (Turkey) M İlhan | 3 | 4
13 | (France) N Mahut | 6 | 6
12 | (Russia) D Tursunov | 6 | 6
(Netherlands) I Sijsling | 3 | 4
(France) B Paire | 6 | 3 | 6^{1}
(Finland) J Nieminen | 2 | 6 | 7^{7}
(Uzbekistan) D Istomin | 7^{11} | 6
Q | (Uzbekistan) F Dustov | 6^{9} | 3

Second round
4 | (Bulgaria) G Dimitrov | 7 | 6
WC | (United Kingdom) J Ward | 5 | 3
(France) É Roger-Vasselin | 6 | 1 | 7^{7}
13 | (France) N Mahut | 3 | 6 | 6^{5}
12 | (Russia) D Tursunov | 6^{3} | 6^{3}
(Finland) J Nieminen | 7^{7} | 7^{7}
(Uzbekistan) D Istomin | 6^{3} | 6^{7}
8 | (Ukraine) A Dolgopolov | 7^{7} | 7^{9}

Third round
4 | (Bulgaria) G Dimitrov | 7^{7} | 6
(France) É Roger-Vasselin | 6^{3} | 4
(Finland) J Nieminen | 4 | 2^{r}
8 | (Ukraine) A Dolgopolov | 6 | 4

Quarterfinals
4 | (Bulgaria) G Dimitrov | w/o
8 | (Ukraine) A Dolgopolov

=== Bottom half ===
==== Section 3 ====
First round
(Austria) J Melzer | 3 | 7^{7} | 6^{2}
WC | (United Kingdom) D Evans | 6 | 6^{5} | 7^{7}
(Ukraine) S Stakhovsky | 7 | 6
Q | (Germany) D Brands | 5 | 2
(Italy) P Lorenzi | 3 | 6 | 3
11 | (Canada) V Pospisil | 6 | 3 | 6
15 | (Czech Republic) R Štěpánek | 6 | 6
(Kazakhstan) M Kukushkin | 4 | 1
(United States) T Smyczek | 4 | 6 | 5
(Australia) B Tomic | 6 | 3 | 7
(France) P-H Mathieu | 7^{7} | 6
(Slovenia) A Bedene | 6^{2} | 4

Second round
7 | (South Africa) K Anderson | 6 | 6
WC | (United Kingdom) D Evans | 2 | 3
(Ukraine) S Stakhovsky | 6 | 6
11 | (Canada) V Pospisil | 4 | 4
15 | (Czech Republic) R Štěpánek | 7^{7} | 7^{7}
(Australia) B Tomic | 6^{4} | 6^{5}
(France) P-H Mathieu | 4 | 4
3 | (United Kingdom) A Murray | 6 | 6

Third round
7 | (South Africa) K Anderson | 6 | 3 | 7^{7}
(Ukraine) S Stakhovsky | 3 | 6 | 6^{4}
15 | (Czech Republic) R Štěpánek | 7^{12} | 6
3 | (United Kingdom) A Murray | 6^{10} | 2

Quarterfinals
7 | (South Africa) K Anderson | 6 | 3 | 2
15 | (Czech Republic) R Štěpánek | 1 | 6 | 6

==== Section 4 ====
First round
(France) K de Schepper | 6 | 7
(India) S Devvarman | 4 | 5
(Australia) L Hewitt | 6 | 6
(Spain) D Gimeno Traver | 3 | 3
(Serbia) D Lajović | 3 | 7^{7} | 1
10 | (Spain) F López | 6 | 6^{3} | 6
16 | (France) J Benneteau | 7^{7} | 3 | 6^{3}
(Dominican Republic) V Estrella Burgos | 6^{3} | 6 | 7^{7}
(France) A Mannarino | 7 | 6
WC | (United Kingdom) D Cox | 5 | 2
(Israel) D Sela | 6 | 6^{5} | 4
Q | (Australia) J Duckworth | 0 | 7^{7} | 6

Second round
6 | (Latvia) E Gulbis | 6^{3} | 5
(France) K de Schepper | 7^{7} | 7
(Australia) L Hewitt | 3 | 4
10 | (Spain) F López | 6 | 6
(Dominican Republic) V Estrella Burgos | 1 | 2
(France) A Mannarino | 6 | 6
Q | (Australia) J Duckworth | 6^{3} | 7 | 4
2 | (Czech Republic) T Berdych | 7^{7} | 5 | 6

Third round
(France) K de Schepper | 6^{3} | 7^{7} | 6^{3}
10 | (Spain) F López | 7^{7} | 6^{4} | 7^{7}
(France) A Mannarino | 6^{2} | 4
2 | (Czech Republic) T Berdych | 7^{7} | 6

Quarterfinals
10 | (Spain) F López | 6 | 7^{9}
2 | (Czech Republic) T Berdych | 4 | 6^{7}

== Qualifying ==
=== Seeds ===
1. (Germany) Michael Berrer (first round)
2. (United States) Ryan Harrison (second round)
3. (Germany) Daniel Brands (qualified)
4. (Turkey) Marsel İlhan (qualified)
5. (United States) Alex Kuznetsov (first round)
6. (Uzbekistan) Farrukh Dustov (qualified)
7. (Russia) Alex Bogomolov Jr. (second round)
8. (Australia) James Duckworth (qualified)

=== Qualifiers ===
1. (Uzbekistan) Farrukh Dustov
2. (Australia) James Duckworth
3. (Germany) Daniel Brands
4. (Turkey) Marsel İlhan

=== Qualifying draw ===
==== First qualifier ====
First round
1 | (Germany) Michael Berrer | 6^{4} | 3
(United States) Bobby Reynolds | 7^{7} | 6
WC | (United Kingdom) Miles Bugby | 6 | 5 | 1
(Australia) Luke Saville | 3 | 7 | 6
(United Kingdom) James Marsalek | 7^{7} | 2 | 6
(United Kingdom) Keelan Oakley | 6^{2} | 6 | 1
(United Kingdom) Dominic Inglot | 7 | 6^{4} | 6^{5}
6 | (Uzbekistan) Farrukh Dustov | 5 | 7^{7} | 7^{7}

Second round
(United States) Bobby Reynolds | 7^{7} | 6
(Australia) Luke Saville | 6^{3} | 1
(United Kingdom) James Marsalek | 5 | 5
6 | (Uzbekistan) Farrukh Dustov | 7 | 7

Qualifying competition
(United States) Bobby Reynolds | 6 | 4 | 3
6 | (Uzbekistan) Farrukh Dustov | 4 | 6 | 6

==== Second qualifier ====
First round
2 | (United States) Ryan Harrison | 6 | 3 | 6
WC | (United Kingdom) Joe Salisbury | 4 | 6 | 4
(France) Rémi Boutillier | 6 | 0
(United Kingdom) Josh Goodall | 4 | 0^{r}
(Spain) Carlos Gómez-Herrera | 3 | 5
(New Zealand) Marcus Daniell | 6 | 7
(United States) Nicholas Monroe | 1 | 2
8 | (Australia) James Duckworth | 6 | 6

Second round
2 | (United States) Ryan Harrison | 6 | 5 | 3
(France) Rémi Boutillier | 4 | 7 | 6
(New Zealand) Marcus Daniell | 3 | 4
8 | (Australia) James Duckworth | 6 | 6

Qualifying competition
(France) Rémi Boutillier | 3 | 1
8 | (Australia) James Duckworth | 6 | 6

==== Third qualifier ====
First round
3 | (Germany) Daniel Brands | 6 | 6
WC | (United Kingdom) Adam Thornton-Brown | 4 | 1
(Greece) Theodoros Angelinogs | 2 | 6^{11}
(United Kingdom) Myles Orton | 6 | 7^{13}
(Republic of Ireland) James McGee | 6 | 7^{10}
(Croatia) Borna Ćorić | 3 | 6^{8}
(United Kingdom) George Coupland | 2 | 3
7 | (Russia) Alex Bogomolov Jr. | 6 | 6

Second round
3 | (Germany) Daniel Brands | 7 | 6
(United Kingdom) Myles Orton | 5 | 3
(Republic of Ireland) James McGee | 7 | 6
7 | (Russia) Alex Bogomolov Jr. | 5 | 4

Qualifying competition
3 | (Germany) Daniel Brands | 6 | 6^{5} | 7
(Republic of Ireland) James McGee | 4 | 7^{7} | 5

==== Fourth qualifier ====
First round
4 | (Turkey) Marsel İlhan | 7^{7} | 6
WC | (United Kingdom) Harry Skinner | 6^{3} | 4
(Australia) Benjamin Mitchell | 7 | 7
(United Kingdom) Alexander Jhun | 5 | 5
(Zimbabwe) Takanyi Garanganga | 6^{6} | 6 | 6
(United Kingdom) Jonny O'Mara | 7^{8} | 3 | 2
(Australia) Matt Reid | 1 | 7^{10} | 7^{10}
5 | (United States) Alex Kuznetsov | 6 | 6^{8} | 6^{8}

Second round
4 | (Turkey) Marsel İlhan | 6^{5} | 7 | 1
(Australia) Benjamin Mitchell | 7^{7} | 5 | 0^{r}
(Zimbabwe) Takanyi Garanganga | 6^{6} | 6 | 6
(Australia) Matt Reid | 7^{8} | 3 | 4

Qualifying competition
4 | (Turkey) Marsel İlhan | 6 | 6
(Zimbabwe) Takanyi Garanganga | 3 | 1
