= 2014 Barcelona Open Banc Sabadell =

- Date: 21–27 April
- Edition: 62nd
- Category: ATP World Tour 500
- Draw: 48S / 16D
- Prize money: €2,127,035
- Surface: Clay
- Location: Barcelona, Spain
- Venue: Real Club de Tenis Barcelona

Champions

Singles
- (Japan) Kei Nishikori

Doubles
- (Netherlands) Jesse Huta Galung / (France) Stéphane Robert
← 2013 ·	Barcelona Open Banc Sabadell	· 2015 →

The 2014 Barcelona Open Banc Sabadell (also known as the Torneo Godó) is a men's tennis tournament played on outdoor clay courts. It was the 62nd edition of the event and part of the ATP World Tour 500 series of the 2014 ATP World Tour. It took place at the Real Club de Tenis Barcelona in Barcelona, Catalonia, Spain, from April 21 through April 27, 2014.

== Points and prize money ==
=== Points distribution ===
Event	W	F	SF	QF	Round of 16	Round of 32	Round of 64	Q	Q2	Q1
Singles	500	300	180	90	45	20	0	10	4	0
Doubles	500	300	180	90	0	—	—	10	0	0

=== Prize money ===
Event	W	F	SF	QF	Round of 16	Round of 32	Round of 64	Q2	Q1
Singles	€422,100	€192,450	€89,650	€42,785	€20,820	€11,095	€6,455	€1,195	€620
Doubles	€131,700	€59,430	€28,020	€13,550	€6,930	—	—	—	—

== Singles main-draw entrants ==
=== Seeds ===
Country	Player	Rank^{1}	Seed
ESP	Rafael Nadal	1	1
ESP	David Ferrer	6	2
ITA	Fabio Fognini	13	3
JPN	Kei Nishikori	17	4
ESP	Tommy Robredo	18	5
ESP	Nicolás Almagro	20	6
POL	Jerzy Janowicz	21	7
UKR	Alexandr Dolgopolov	22	8
LAT	Ernests Gulbis	23	9
GER	Philipp Kohlschreiber	25	10
ESP	Fernando Verdasco	26	11
CRO	Marin Čilić	27	12
ESP	Feliciano López	31	13
ESP	Marcel Granollers	32	14
RUS	Dmitry Tursunov	33	15
FRA	Benoît Paire	34	16

- ^{1} Rankings as of April 14, 2014.

=== Other entrants ===
The following players received wildcards into the main draw:

- (Argentina) Facundo Argüello
- (Spain) Roberto Carballés Baena
- (Spain) Iñigo Cervantes
- (Spain) Daniel Gimeno Traver

The following players received entry from the qualifying draw:

- (Germany) Andreas Beck
- (Turkey) Marsel İlhan
- (Russia) Andrey Kuznetsov
- (Spain) Marc López
- (Austria) Dominic Thiem
- (Italy) Matteo Viola

=== Withdrawals ===
Before the tournament

- (Spain) Pablo Andújar → replaced by (Poland) Michał Przysiężny
- (Argentina) Federico Delbonis → replaced by (Spain) Albert Ramos
- (France) Richard Gasquet → replaced by (Russia) Nikolay Davydenko
- (Croatia) Ivo Karlović → replaced by (India) Somdev Devvarman
- (Argentina) Juan Mónaco → replaced by (Kazakhstan) Aleksandr Nedovyesov

=== Retirements ===
- (Italy) Fabio Fognini (right leg injury)
- (Germany) Philipp Kohlschreiber
- (France) Benoît Paire (knee injury)

== Doubles main-draw entrants ==
=== Seeds ===
Country	Player	Country	Player	Rank^{1}	Seed
~~USA~~	~~Bob Bryan~~	~~USA~~	~~Mike Bryan~~	~~2~~	~~1~~
AUT	Alexander Peya	BRA	Bruno Soares	7	2
CRO	Ivan Dodig	BRA	Marcelo Melo	11	3
ESP	David Marrero	ESP	Fernando Verdasco	16	4
CAN	Daniel Nestor	SRB	Nenad Zimonjić	28	5

- Rankings are as of April 14, 2014.

=== Other entrants ===
The following pairs received wildcards into the doubles main draw:

- (Spain) Roberto Bautista Agut / (Spain) Albert Montañés
- (Spain) Pablo Carreño Busta / (Spain) Albert Ramos

The following pair received entry from the qualifying draw:

- (Russia) Teymuraz Gabashvili / (Kazakhstan) Mikhail Kukushkin

The following pairs received entry as alternates:

- (India) Somdev Devvarman / (Croatia) Ante Pavić
- (Netherlands) Jesse Huta Galung / (France) Stéphane Robert

=== Withdrawals ===
Before the tournament

- (United States) Bob Bryan (shoulder injury)
- (France) Benoît Paire (knee injury)

=== Retirements ===
- (Spain) Marc López (left leg injury)

== Finals ==
=== Singles ===
- (Japan) Kei Nishikori defeated (Colombia) Santiago Giraldo, 6–2, 6–2

=== Doubles ===
- (Netherlands) Jesse Huta Galung / (France) Stéphane Robert defeated (Canada) Daniel Nestor / (Serbia) Nenad Zimonjić, 6–3, 6–3
