= 2014 Swiss Indoors – Singles =

Singles
- 2014 Swiss Indoors

Final
- Champion: (Switzerland) Roger Federer
- Runner-up: (Belgium) David Goffin
- Score: 6–2, 6–2

Details
- Draw: 32 (4 Q / 3 WC )
- Seeds: 8

Events
Singles	Doubles
← 2013 ·	Swiss Indoors	· 2015 →

Juan Martín del Potro was the two-time defending champion, but withdrew because of a wrist injury.
Roger Federer won the title, defeating David Goffin in the final, 6–2, 6–2.

== Seeds ==
1. (Switzerland) Roger Federer (champion)
2. (Spain) Rafael Nadal (quarterfinals)
3. (Switzerland) Stan Wawrinka (first round)
4. (Canada) Milos Raonic (quarterfinals)
5. (Bulgaria) Grigor Dimitrov (quarterfinals)
6. (Latvia) Ernests Gulbis (first round)
7. (Belgium) David Goffin (final)
8. (Croatia) Ivo Karlović (semifinals)

== Draw ==
=== Key ===
- Q = Qualifier
- WC = Wild card
- LL = Lucky loser
- Alt = Alternate
- SE = Special exempt
- PR = Protected ranking
- ITF = ITF entry
- JE = Junior exempt
- w/o = Walkover
- r = Retired
- d = Defaulted
- SR = Special ranking

=== Finals ===
Semifinals
1	(Switzerland) Roger Federer	7^{10}	3	6
8	(Croatia) Ivo Karlović	6^{8}	6	3
7	(Belgium) David Goffin	6	3	6
WC	(Croatia) Borna Ćorić	4	6	3

Final
1	(Switzerland) Roger Federer	6	6
7	(Belgium) David Goffin	2	2

=== Top half ===
First round
1	(Switzerland) R Federer	6	6
(Luxembourg) G Müller	2	1
(Poland) J Janowicz	1	1
(Uzbekistan) D Istomin	6	6
(Finland) J Nieminen	3	7^{7}	4
(Canada) V Pospisil	6	6^{4}	6
WC	(Germany) A Zverev	6	4	2
5	(Bulgaria) G Dimitrov	2	6	6
3	(Switzerland) S Wawrinka	4	7^{7}	3
(Kazakhstan) M Kukushkin	6	6^{1}	6
Q	(Portugal) G Elias	3	2
(Germany) B Becker	6	6
Q	(France) K de Schepper	7^{7}	7
(Argentina) F Delbonis	6^{3}	5
(Czech Republic) L Rosol	6^{4}	3
8	(Croatia) I Karlović	7^{7}	6

Second round
1	(Switzerland) R Federer	3	6	6
(Uzbekistan) D Istomin	6	3	4
(Canada) V Pospisil	2	2
5	(Bulgaria) G Dimitrov	6	6
(Kazakhstan) M Kukushkin	7^{7}	6^{4}	0^{r}
(Germany) B Becker	6^{3}	7^{7}	4
Q	(France) K de Schepper	7^{8}	4	3
8	(Croatia) I Karlović	6^{6}	6	6

Quarterfinals
1	(Switzerland) R Federer	7^{7}	6
5	(Bulgaria) G Dimitrov	6^{4}	2
(Germany) B Becker	4	4
8	(Croatia) I Karlović	6	6

Semifinals
1	(Switzerland) R Federer	7^{10}	3	6
8	(Croatia) I Karlović	6^{8}	6	3

=== Bottom half ===
First round
7	(Belgium) D Goffin	7^{7}	6
(Austria) D Thiem	6^{4}	3
(Croatia) I Dodig	6	6^{7}	6
WC	(Switzerland) M Chiudinelli	4	7^{9}	4
(Argentina) C Berlocq	6^{5}	4
(United States) D Young	7^{7}	6
(United States) S Johnson	6^{4}	4
4	(Canada) M Raonic	7^{7}	6
6	(Latvia) E Gulbis	6^{2}	3
WC	(Croatia) B Ćorić	7^{7}	6
(Kazakhstan) A Golubev	6	6
(Russia) T Gabashvili	3	3
Q	(France) P-H Herbert	6	6^{5}	7^{7}
(France) É Roger-Vasselin	3	7^{7}	6^{3}
Q	(Italy) S Bolelli	2	2
2	(Spain) R Nadal	6	6

Second round
7	(Belgium) D Goffin	7^{7}	6
(Croatia) I Dodig	6^{0}	4
(United States) D Young	4	7^{7}	6^{2}
4	(Canada) M Raonic	6	6^{5}	7^{7}
WC	(Croatia) B Ćorić	6	6
(Kazakhstan) A Golubev	4	4
Q	(France) P-H Herbert	1	1
2	(Spain) R Nadal	6	6

Quarterfinals
7	(Belgium) D Goffin	6^{3}	6	6
4	(Canada) M Raonic	7^{7}	3	4
WC	(Croatia) B Ćorić	6	7^{7}
2	(Spain) R Nadal	2	6^{4}

Semifinals
7	(Belgium) D Goffin	6	3	6
WC	(Croatia) B Ćorić	4	6	3

== Qualifying ==
=== Seeds ===
1. (Germany) Jan-Lennard Struff (first round)
2. (Dominican Republic) Víctor Estrella Burgos (first round)
3. (Netherlands) Robin Haase (qualifying competition)
4. (Italy) Simone Bolelli (qualified)
5. (France) Paul-Henri Mathieu (qualifying competition, retired)
6. (Austria) Andreas Haider-Maurer (qualifying competition)
7. (Japan) Tatsuma Ito (first round)
8. (Cyprus) Marcos Baghdatis (first round)

=== Qualifiers ===
1. (France) Pierre-Hugues Herbert
2. (Portugal) Gastão Elias
3. (France) Kenny de Schepper
4. (Italy) Simone Bolelli

=== Qualifying draw ===
==== First qualifier ====
First round
1	(Germany) Jan-Lennard Struff	5	6^{2}
(France) Pierre-Hugues Herbert	7	7^{7}
(Israel) Dudi Sela	6	5	6^{6}
5	(France) Paul-Henri Mathieu	4	7	7^{8}

Qualifying competition
(France) Pierre-Hugues Herbert	2
5	(France) Paul-Henri Mathieu	3^{r}

==== Second qualifier ====
First round
2	(Dominican Republic) Víctor Estrella Burgos	4	4
(France) Nicolas Mahut	6	6
(Portugal) Gastão Elias	7^{7}	6
8	(Cyprus) Marcos Baghdatis	6^{5}	3

Qualifying competition
(France) Nicolas Mahut	1	7^{7}	6^{7}
(Portugal) Gastão Elias	6	6^{2}	7^{9}

==== Third qualifier ====
First round
3	(Netherlands) Robin Haase	6	7^{7}
WC	(Switzerland) Henri Laaksonen	3	6^{4}
(France) Kenny de Schepper	6	3	6
7	(Japan) Tatsuma Ito	3	6	3

Qualifying competition
3	(Netherlands) Robin Haase	4	4
(France) Kenny de Schepper	6	6

==== Fourth qualifier ====
First round
4	(Italy) Simone Bolelli	7	4	6
WC	(France) Lucas Pouille	5	6	2
WC	(Switzerland) Yann Marti	3	2
6	(Austria) Andreas Haider-Maurer	6	6

Qualifying competition
4	(Italy) Simone Bolelli	3	6	6
6	(Austria) Andreas Haider-Maurer	6	4	3
