= 2014 Swiss Indoors – Doubles =

Doubles
- 2014 Swiss Indoors

Final
- Champions: (Canada) Vasek Pospisil (Serbia) Nenad Zimonjić
- Runners-up: (Croatia) Marin Draganja (Finland) Henri Kontinen
- Score: 7–6^{(15–13)}, 1–6, [10–5]

Details
- Draw: 16
- Seeds: 4

Events
| Singles | Doubles |
| ← 2013 · | Swiss Indoors | · 2015 → |

Treat Huey and Dominic Inglot were the defending champions, but Huey decided to compete in Valencia instead. Inglot played alongside Florin Mergea, but lost in the semifinals to Vasek Pospisil and Nenad Zimonjić.
Pospisil and Zimonjić went on to win the title, defeating Marin Draganja and Henri Kontinen in the final, 7–6^{(15–13)}, 1–6, [10–5].

== Seeds ==
1. (Croatia) Ivan Dodig / (Brazil) Marcelo Melo (semifinals)
2. (Canada) Vasek Pospisil / (Serbia) Nenad Zimonjić (champions)
3. (India) Rohan Bopanna / (Canada) Daniel Nestor (first round)
4. (Poland) Łukasz Kubot / (Sweden) Robert Lindstedt (first round)

== Draw ==
=== Key ===
- Q = Qualifier
- WC = Wild card
- LL = Lucky loser
- Alt = Alternate
- SE = Special exempt
- PR = Protected ranking
- ITF = ITF entry
- JE = Junior exempt
- w/o = Walkover
- r = Retired
- d = Defaulted
- SR = Special ranking

=== Draw ===
First round
1 | (Croatia) I Dodig (Brazil) M Melo | 6 | 6
(Poland) M Fyrstenberg (United States) S Johnson | 1 | 2
WC | (Switzerland) M Chiudinelli (Switzerland) M Lammer | 4 | 6 | [9]
(Germany) A Begemann (Austria) J Knowle | 6 | 4 | [11]
3 | (India) R Bopanna (Canada) D Nestor | 3 | 6^{4}
(Croatia) M Draganja (Finland) H Kontinen | 6 | 7^{7}
Q | (United Kingdom) C Fleming (United Kingdom) J Marray | 6 | 6^{5} | [5]
(Germany) B Becker (Austria) D Thiem | 3 | 7^{7} | [10]
(United Kingdom) D Inglot (Romania) F Mergea | 7^{7} | 6
(United States) S Lipsky (Austria) P Oswald | 6^{3} | 4
(Mexico) S González (Czech Republic) L Rosol | 6 | 7
4 | (Poland) Ł Kubot (Sweden) R Lindstedt | 4 | 5
(United Kingdom) J Murray (Australia) J Peers | 7 | 5 | [5]
(Poland) M Matkowski (India) L Paes | 5 | 7 | [10]
WC | (Switzerland) S Ehrat (Switzerland) H Laaksonen | 4 | 1
2 | (Canada) V Pospisil (Serbia) N Zimonjić | 6 | 6

Quarterfinals
1 | (Croatia) I Dodig (Brazil) M Melo | 7^{11} | 6^{4} | [10]
(Germany) A Begemann (Austria) J Knowle | 6^{9} | 7^{7} | [4]
(Croatia) M Draganja (Finland) H Kontinen | 6 | 7^{7}
(Germany) B Becker (Austria) D Thiem | 3 | 6^{4}
(United Kingdom) D Inglot (Romania) F Mergea | 6 | 7
(Mexico) S González (Czech Republic) L Rosol | 3 | 5
(Poland) M Matkowski (India) L Paes | 7^{10} | 5 | [4]
2 | (Canada) V Pospisil (Serbia) N Zimonjić | 6^{8} | 7 | [10]

Semifinals
1 | (Croatia) I Dodig (Brazil) M Melo | 3 | 6 | [4]
(Croatia) M Draganja (Finland) H Kontinen | 6 | 2 | [10]
(United Kingdom) D Inglot (Romania) F Mergea | 6^{6} | 6 | [4]
2 | (Canada) V Pospisil (Serbia) N Zimonjić | 7^{8} | 4 | [10]

Final
(Croatia) M Draganja (Finland) H Kontinen | 6^{13} | 6 | [5]
2 | (Canada) V Pospisil (Serbia) N Zimonjić | 7^{15} | 1 | [10]

== Qualifying ==
=== Seeds ===
1. (United Kingdom) Colin Fleming / (United Kingdom) Jonathan Marray (qualified)
2. (Germany) Frank Moser / (Germany) Alexander Satschko (qualifying competition)

=== Qualifiers ===
1. (United Kingdom) Colin Fleming / (United Kingdom) Jonathan Marray

=== Qualifying draw ===
| First round | | | | Qualifying competition |
| 1 | (United Kingdom) Colin Fleming (United Kingdom) Jonathan Marray | 7^{7} | 7^{9} |
| | (Argentina) Carlos Berlocq (Argentina) Federico Delbonis | 6^{3} | 6^{7} | 1 | (United Kingdom) Colin Fleming (United Kingdom) Jonathan Marray | 6 | 6 |
| | (Switzerland) Stefan Fiacan (Argentina) Cristian Villagrán | 4 | 3 | 2 | (Germany) Frank Moser (Germany) Alexander Satschko | 2 | 4 |
| 2 | (Germany) Frank Moser (Germany) Alexander Satschko | 6 | 6 |
