= 2014 ABN AMRO World Tennis Tournament – Doubles =

Doubles
- 2014 ABN AMRO World Tennis Tournament

Final
- Champions: (France) Michaël Llodra (France) Nicolas Mahut
- Runners-up: (Netherlands) Jean-Julien Rojer (Romania) Horia Tecău
- Score: 6–2, 7–6^{(7–4)}

Events
Singles	Doubles
← 2013 ·	ABN AMRO World Tennis Tournament	· 2015 →

Robert Lindstedt and Nenad Zimonjić were the defending champions but decided not to participate together. Lindstedt played alongside Łukasz Kubot, but lost in the first round to Julien Benneteau and Édouard Roger-Vasselin. Zimonjić teamed up with Daniel Nestor, but lost in the quarterfinals to Michaël Llodra and Nicolas Mahut.

Llodra and Mahut won the title, defeating Jean-Julien Rojer and Horia Tecău in the final, 6–2, 7–6^{(7–4)}.

== Seeds ==
1. (Croatia) Ivan Dodig / (Brazil) Marcelo Melo (first round)
2. (Poland) Łukasz Kubot / (Sweden) Robert Lindstedt (first round)
3. (Canada) Daniel Nestor / (Serbia) Nenad Zimonjić (quarterfinals)
4. (India) Rohan Bopanna / (Pakistan) Aisam-ul-Haq Qureshi (first round)

== Draw ==
=== Key ===
- Q = Qualifier
- WC = Wild card
- LL = Lucky loser
- Alt = Alternate
- SE = Special exempt
- PR = Protected ranking
- ITF = ITF entry
- JE = Junior exempt
- w/o = Walkover
- r = Retired
- d = Defaulted
- SR = Special ranking

=== Draw ===
First round
1	(Croatia) I Dodig (Brazil) M Melo	6	6^{2}	[6]
(Czech Republic) L Rosol (Italy) A Seppi	4	7^{7}	[10]
WC	(Netherlands) T de Bakker (Netherlands) I Sijsling	3	6^{8}
(Poland) M Fyrstenberg (Poland) M Matkowski	6	7^{10}
3	(Canada) D Nestor (Serbia) N Zimonjić	6	3	[10]
LL	(United States) J Cerretani (Canada) A Shamasdin	4	6	[5]
(France) M Llodra (France) N Mahut	7^{7}	6
WC	(Netherlands) J Huta Galung (United Kingdom) R Hutchins	6^{1}	3
(Netherlands) J-J Rojer (Romania) H Tecău	6	6^{6}	[10]
Q	(Germany) M Berrer (Ukraine) S Stakhovsky	2	7^{8}	[5]
(Sweden) J Brunström (Finland) J Nieminen	7^{7}	4	[11]
4	(India) R Bopanna (Pakistan) A-u-H Qureshi	6^{4}	6	[9]
(Germany) P Kohlschreiber (Germany) F Mayer	3	6	[7]
(Austria) J Knowle (Australia) J Peers	6	3	[10]
(France) J Benneteau (France) É Roger-Vasselin	6	7^{7}
2	(Poland) Ł Kubot (Sweden) R Lindstedt	3	6^{4}

Quarterfinals
(Czech Republic) L Rosol (Italy) A Seppi	4	4
(Poland) M Fyrstenberg (Poland) M Matkowski	6	6
3	(Canada) D Nestor (Serbia) N Zimonjić	4	6	[1]
(France) M Llodra (France) N Mahut	6	4	[10]
(Netherlands) J-J Rojer (Romania) H Tecău	7^{7}	6
(Sweden) J Brunström (Finland) J Nieminen	6^{5}	4
(Austria) J Knowle (Australia) J Peers	6	1	[7]
(France) J Benneteau (France) É Roger-Vasselin	3	6	[10]

Semifinals
(Poland) M Fyrstenberg (Poland) M Matkowski	3	4
(France) M Llodra (France) N Mahut	6	6
(Netherlands) J-J Rojer (Romania) H Tecău	7^{8}	6
(France) J Benneteau (France) É Roger-Vasselin	6^{6}	4

Final
(France) M Llodra (France) N Mahut	6	7^{7}
(Netherlands) J-J Rojer (Romania) H Tecău	2	6^{4}

== Qualifying ==
=== Seeds ===
1. (United States) James Cerretani / (Canada) Adil Shamasdin (qualifying competition, lucky losers)
2. (Netherlands) Stephan Fransen / (Netherlands) Wesley Koolhof (first round)

=== Qualifiers ===
1. (Germany) Michael Berrer / (Ukraine) Sergiy Stakhovsky

=== Lucky losers ===
1. (United States) James Cerretani / (Canada) Adil Shamasdin

=== Qualifying draw ===
First round				Qualifying competition
				1	(United States) James Cerretani (Canada) Adil Shamasdin	6^{6}	5
	(Germany) Michael Berrer (Ukraine) Sergiy Stakhovsky	7^{7}	6		(Germany) Michael Berrer (Ukraine) Sergiy Stakhovsky	7^{8}	7
2	(Netherlands) Stephan Fransen (Netherlands) Wesley Koolhof	6^{3}	3
