= 2014 ABN AMRO World Tennis Tournament – Singles =

Singles
- 2014 ABN AMRO World Tennis Tournament

Final
- Champion: (Czech Republic) Tomáš Berdych
- Runner-up: (Croatia) Marin Čilić
- Score: 6–4, 6–2

Details
- Draw: 32 (4 Q / 4 WC )
- Seeds: 8

Events
Singles	Doubles
- ABN AMRO World Tennis Tournament

Juan Martín del Potro was the defending champion but lost in the quarterfinals to Ernests Gulbis.
Tomáš Berdych won the title, defeating Marin Čilić in the final, 6–4, 6–2.

== Seeds ==
1. (Argentina) Juan Martín del Potro (quarterfinals)
2. (United Kingdom) Andy Murray (quarterfinals)
3. (Czech Republic) Tomáš Berdych (champion)
4. (France) Richard Gasquet (second round)
5. (France) Jo-Wilfried Tsonga (second round)
6. (Germany) Tommy Haas (second round)
7. (Russia) Mikhail Youzhny (first round)
8. (Bulgaria) Grigor Dimitrov (second round)

Click on the seed number of a player to go to their draw section.

== Draw ==
Key

- Q = Qualifier
- WC = Wild card
- LL = Lucky loser
- Alt = Alternate
- ITF = ITF entry
- PR = Protected ranking
- SR = Special ranking
- SE = Special exempt
- JE = Junior exempt
- JR = Junior Accelerator Programme entrant
- CO = College Accelerator Programme entrant
- NG = Next Gen Accelerator Program entrant
- w/o = Walkover
- r = Retired
- d = Defaulted

=== Finals ===
Semifinals
(Latvia) Ernests Gulbis	3	2
3	(Czech Republic) Tomáš Berdych	6	6
WC	(Netherlands) Igor Sijsling	7	3	2
(Croatia) Marin Čilić	5	6	6

Final
3	(Czech Republic) Tomáš Berdych	6	6
(Croatia) Marin Čilić	4	2

=== Top half ===
First round
1	(Argentina) JM del Potro	7^{8}	6
(France) G Monfils	6^{6}	3
Q	(France) P-H Mathieu	4	7^{7}	6
(Croatia) I Dodig	6	6^{2}	4
(Latvia) E Gulbis	6	7^{7}
(Uzbekistan) D Istomin	4	6^{4}
(Russia) D Tursunov	2	6	4
8	(Bulgaria) G Dimitrov	6	1	6
3	(Czech Republic) T Berdych	6	6
(Italy) A Seppi	3	3
(France) N Mahut	7	6
LL	(Germany) D Brands	5	3
(Poland) J Janowicz	3	6	6
(France) J Benneteau	6	4	4
(Spain) F Verdasco	7^{7}	6^{1}	5
6	(Germany) T Haas	6^{4}	7^{7}	7

Second round
1	(Argentina) JM del Potro	6	7^{7}
Q	(France) P-H Mathieu	2	6^{2}
(Latvia) E Gulbis	6	7^{7}
8	(Bulgaria) G Dimitrov	4	6^{3}
3	(Czech Republic) T Berdych	6	6
(France) N Mahut	4	3
(Poland) J Janowicz	6	6
6	(Germany) T Haas	4	4

Quarterfinals
1	(Argentina) JM del Potro	3	4
(Latvia) E Gulbis	6	6
3	(Czech Republic) T Berdych	6^{9}	6	6
(Poland) J Janowicz	7^{11}	2	4

Semifinals
(Latvia) E Gulbis	3	2
3	(Czech Republic) T Berdych	6	6

=== Bottom half ===
First round
7	(Russia) M Youzhny	2	2
WC	(Netherlands) I Sijsling	6	6
WC	(Netherlands) J Huta Galung	4	6	3
Q	(Germany) M Berrer	6	2	6
(Germany) P Kohlschreiber	6	7
Q	(Ukraine) S Stakhovsky	2	5
WC	(Netherlands) T de Bakker	7^{7}	6^{2}	3
4	(France) R Gasquet	6^{5}	7^{7}	6
5	(France) J-W Tsonga	4	6	6
(Germany) F Mayer	6	3	1
(Croatia) M Čilić	6	6
(Czech Republic) L Rosol	2	2
Q	(Austria) D Thiem	6	4	6
(Finland) J Nieminen	4	6	4
(France) É Roger-Vasselin	3	3
2/WC	(United Kingdom) A Murray	6	6

Second round
WC	(Netherlands) I Sijsling	6	6
Q	(Germany) M Berrer	1	2
(Germany) P Kohlschreiber	7	7
4	(France) R Gasquet	5	5
5	(France) J-W Tsonga	4	4
(Croatia) M Čilić	6	6
Q	(Austria) D Thiem	4	6	3
2/WC	(United Kingdom) A Murray	6	3	6

Quarterfinals
WC	(Netherlands) I Sijsling	6	2	6
(Germany) P Kohlschreiber	2	6	1
(Croatia) M Čilić	6	6
2/WC	(United Kingdom) A Murray	3	4

Semifinals
WC	(Netherlands) I Sijsling	7	3	2
(Croatia) M Čilić	5	6	6

== Qualifying ==
=== Seeds ===
1. (Germany) Daniel Brands (qualifying competition, lucky loser)
2. (Romania) Victor Hănescu (qualifying competition)
3. (Poland) Łukasz Kubot (qualifying competition)
4. (France) Kenny de Schepper (first round)
5. (Ukraine) Sergiy Stakhovsky (qualified)
6. (Germany) Peter Gojowczyk (first round, retired)
7. (France) Michaël Llodra (withdrew)
8. (Czech Republic) Jan Hájek (first round)

=== Qualifiers ===
1. (France) Paul-Henri Mathieu
2. (Ukraine) Sergiy Stakhovsky
3. (Germany) Michael Berrer
4. (Austria) Dominic Thiem

=== Lucky loser ===
1. (Germany) Daniel Brands

=== Qualifying draw ===
==== First qualifier ====
First round
1	(Germany) Daniel Brands	7^{7}	6
WC	(Netherlands) Wesley Koolhof	6^{4}	1
(France) Paul-Henri Mathieu	6	6
8	(Czech Republic) Jan Hájek	3	2

Qualifying competition
1	(Germany) Daniel Brands	7	6^{4}	3
(France) Paul-Henri Mathieu	5	7^{7}	6

==== Second qualifier ====
First round
2	(Romania) Victor Hănescu	6	6
WC	(Netherlands) Alban Meuffels	1	2
(Belgium) Yannick Mertens	3	2
5	(Ukraine) Sergiy Stakhovsky	6	6

Qualifying competition
2	(Romania) Victor Hănescu	6^{2}	4
5	(Ukraine) Sergiy Stakhovsky	7^{7}	6

==== Third qualifier ====
First round
3	(Poland) Łukasz Kubot	4	6	3
WC	(Australia) Thanasi Kokkinakis	6	1	0^{r}
(Germany) Michael Berrer	6	6
Alt	(Netherlands) Stephan Fransen	2	2

Qualifying competition
3	(Poland) Łukasz Kubot	7	4	4
(Germany) Michael Berrer	5	6	6

==== Fourth qualifier ====
First round
4	(France) Kenny de Schepper	6^{4}	6^{1}
(Austria) Dominic Thiem	7^{7}	7^{7}
(Slovakia) Adrian Sikora	6	0
6	(Germany) Peter Gojowczyk	3	0^{r}

Qualifying competition
(Austria) Dominic Thiem	6	7
(Slovakia) Adrian Sikora	1	5
