= 2014 Aegon Championships – Doubles =

Doubles
- 2014 Aegon Championships

Final
- Champions: (Austria) Alexander Peya (Brazil) Bruno Soares
- Runners-up: (United Kingdom) Jamie Murray (Australia) John Peers
- Score: 4–6, 7–6^{(7–4)}, [10–4]

Details
- Draw: 24

Events
Singles	Doubles
← 2013 ·	Queen's Club Championships	· 2015 →

Bob and Mike Bryan were the defending champions, but lost in the second round to Jamie Murray and John Peers.
Alexander Peya and Bruno Soares won the title, defeating Murray and Peers in the final, 4–6, 7–6^{(7–4)}, [10–4].

== Seeds ==
All seeds received byes into the second round.

1. (United States) Bob Bryan / (United States) Mike Bryan (second round)
2. (Austria) Alexander Peya / (Brazil) Bruno Soares (champions)
3. (Canada) Daniel Nestor / (Serbia) Nenad Zimonjić (semifinals)
4. (India) Leander Paes / (Czech Republic) Radek Štěpánek (quarterfinals)
5. (India) Rohan Bopanna / (Pakistan) Aisam-ul-Haq Qureshi (quarterfinals)
6. (Philippines) Treat Huey / (United Kingdom) Dominic Inglot (second round)
7. (France) Julien Benneteau / (France) Édouard Roger-Vasselin (semifinals)
8. (United Kingdom) Colin Fleming / (Poland) Marcin Matkowski (quarterfinals)

== Draw ==
=== Key ===
- Q = Qualifier
- WC = Wild card
- LL = Lucky loser
- Alt = Alternate
- SE = Special exempt
- PR = Protected ranking
- ITF = ITF entry
- JE = Junior exempt
- w/o = Walkover
- r = Retired
- d = Defaulted
- SR = Special ranking

=== Finals ===
Semifinals
(United Kingdom) Jamie Murray (Australia) John Peers	6	7^{7}
7	(France) Julien Benneteau (France) Édouard Roger-Vasselin	4	6^{4}
3	(Canada) Daniel Nestor (Serbia) Nenad Zimonjić	5	3
2	(Austria) Alexander Peya (Brazil) Bruno Soares	7	6

Final
(United Kingdom) Jamie Murray (Australia) John Peers	6	6^{4}	[4]
2	(Austria) Alexander Peya (Brazil) Bruno Soares	4	7^{7}	[10]

=== Top half ===
First round
(United Kingdom) J Murray (Australia) J Peers	6	4	[10]
WC	(United Kingdom) D Evans (United Kingdom) J Ward	1	6	[4]
(Australia) M Ebden (Poland) M Fyrstenberg	3	4
(South Africa) K Anderson (Israel) J Erlich	6	6
(Croatia) M Čilić (Brazil) A Sá	6	4	[3]
(United States) N Monroe (Canada) V Pospisil	4	6	[10]
(Ukraine) A Dolgopolov (Latvia) E Gulbis	6	6
(Finland) J Nieminen (France) G Simon	4	4

Second round
1	(United States) B Bryan (United States) M Bryan	6^{6}	6^{3}
(United Kingdom) J Murray (Australia) J Peers	7^{8}	7^{7}
(South Africa) K Anderson (Israel) J Erlich	6^{5}	6	[10]
6	(Philippines) T Huey (United Kingdom) D Inglot	7^{7}	4	[4]
4	(India) L Paes (Czech Republic) R Štěpánek	7^{7}	6
(United States) N Monroe (Canada) V Pospisil	6^{1}	1
(Ukraine) A Dolgopolov (Latvia) E Gulbis	6^{1}	6^{r}
7	(France) J Benneteau (France) É Roger-Vasselin	7^{7}	5

Quarterfinals
(United Kingdom) J Murray (Australia) J Peers	6	7^{16}
(South Africa) K Anderson (Israel) J Erlich	4	6^{14}
4	(India) L Paes (Czech Republic) R Štěpánek	6	3	[6]
7	(France) J Benneteau (France) É Roger-Vasselin	4	6	[10]

Semifinals
(United Kingdom) J Murray (Australia) J Peers	6	7^{7}
7	(France) J Benneteau (France) É Roger-Vasselin	4	6^{4}

=== Bottom half ===
First round
(United States) E Butorac (South Africa) R Klaasen	6	7^{9}
(Australia) M Matosevic (France) B Paire	4	6^{7}
(Bulgaria) G Dimitrov (Switzerland) S Wawrinka	6	6
WC	(United Kingdom) K Skupski (United Kingdom) N Skupski	4	4
(Australia) C Guccione (Australia) L Hewitt	4	6	[7]
(France) J Chardy (Russia) D Tursunov	6	3	[10]
(France) N Mahut (France) J-W Tsonga	7^{7}	6^{4}	[12]
(Spain) F López (Austria) J Melzer	6^{3}	7^{7}	[14]

Second round
8	(United Kingdom) C Fleming (Poland) M Matkowski	6	7^{7}
(United States) E Butorac (South Africa) R Klaasen	4	6^{3}
(Bulgaria) G Dimitrov (Switzerland) S Wawrinka	6^{4}	5
3	(Canada) D Nestor (Serbia) N Zimonjić	7^{7}	7
5	(India) R Bopanna (Pakistan) A-u-H Qureshi	7^{7}	6
(France) J Chardy (Russia) D Tursunov	6^{2}	4
(Spain) F López (Austria) J Melzer	6^{5}	4
2	(Austria) A Peya (Brazil) B Soares	7^{7}	6

Quarterfinals
8	(United Kingdom) C Fleming (Poland) M Matkowski	4	4
3	(Canada) D Nestor (Serbia) N Zimonjić	6	6
5	(India) R Bopanna (Pakistan) A-u-H Qureshi	6	4	[4]
2	(Austria) A Peya (Brazil) B Soares	2	6	[10]

Semifinals
3	(Canada) D Nestor (Serbia) N Zimonjić	5	3
2	(Austria) A Peya (Brazil) B Soares	7	6
