= 2014 ABN AMRO World Tennis Tournament =

- Date: 10–16 February
- Edition: 41st
- Category: ATP World Tour 500
- Draw: 32S / 16D
- Prize money: €1,207,500
- Surface: Hard
- Location: Rotterdam, Netherlands
- Venue: Rotterdam Ahoy

Champions

Singles
- (Czech Republic) Tomáš Berdych

Doubles
- (France) Michaël Llodra / (France) Nicolas Mahut

Wheelchair singles
- (Japan) Shingo Kunieda

Wheelchair doubles
- (United Kingdom) Gordon Reid / (Netherlands) Maikel Scheffers
- ABN AMRO World Tennis Tournament

The 2014 ABN AMRO World Tennis Tournament (or Rotterdam Open) was a men's tennis tournament played on indoor hard courts. It took place at the Rotterdam Ahoy arena in the Dutch city of Rotterdam, between 10 and 16 February 2014. It was the 41st edition of the Rotterdam Open, whose official name is the ABN AMRO World Tennis Tournament. The competition was part of the ATP World Tour 500 series of the 2014 ATP World Tour. Third-seeded Tomáš Berdych won the singles title.

== Finals ==
=== Singles ===
- (Czech Republic) Tomáš Berdych defeated (Croatia) Marin Čilić, 6–4, 6–2

=== Doubles ===
- (France) Michaël Llodra / (France) Nicolas Mahut defeated (Netherlands) Jean-Julien Rojer / (Romania) Horia Tecău, 6–2, 7–6^{(7–4)}

== Singles main-draw entrants ==
=== Seeds ===
Country	Player	Rank^{1}	Seed
ARG	Juan Martín del Potro	4	1
GRB	Andy Murray	6	2
CZE	Tomáš Berdych	7	3
FRA	Richard Gasquet	9	4
FRA	Jo-Wilfried Tsonga	10	5
GER	Tommy Haas	12	6
RUS	Mikhail Youzhny	14	7
BUL	Grigor Dimitrov	19	8

- Rankings are as of February 3, 2014.

=== Other entrants ===
The following players received wildcards into the singles main draw:

- (Netherlands) Thiemo de Bakker
- (Netherlands) Jesse Huta Galung
- (United Kingdom) Andy Murray
- (Netherlands) Igor Sijsling

The following players received entry from the qualifying draw:

- (Germany) Michael Berrer
- (France) Paul-Henri Mathieu
- (Ukraine) Sergiy Stakhovsky
- (Austria) Dominic Thiem

The following player received entry as a lucky loser:

- (Germany) Daniel Brands

=== Withdrawals ===
Before the tournament

- (Austria) Jürgen Melzer
- (France) Benoît Paire (left patellar tendon injury)
- (Canada) Milos Raonic (left foot injury)
- (France) Gilles Simon (back injury)
- (Switzerland) Stanislas Wawrinka (leg injury)

== Doubles main-draw entrants ==
=== Seeds ===
Country	Player	Country	Player	Rank^{1}	Seed
CRO	Ivan Dodig	BRA	Marcelo Melo	11	1
POL	Łukasz Kubot	SWE	Robert Lindstedt	21	2
CAN	Daniel Nestor	SRB	Nenad Zimonjić	27	3
IND	Rohan Bopanna	PAK	Aisam-ul-Haq Qureshi	31	4

- Rankings are as of February 3, 2014.

=== Other entrants ===
The following pairs received wildcards into the doubles main draw:

- (Netherlands) Thiemo de Bakker / (Netherlands) Igor Sijsling
- (Netherlands) Jesse Huta Galung / (United Kingdom) Ross Hutchins

The following pair received entry from the qualifying draw:

- (Germany) Michael Berrer / (Ukraine) Sergiy Stakhovsky

The following pair received entry as lucky losers:

- (United States) James Cerretani / (Canada) Adil Shamasdin

=== Withdrawals ===
Before the tournament

- (Russia) Dmitry Tursunov (leg injury)
