= 2014 Andy Murray tennis season =

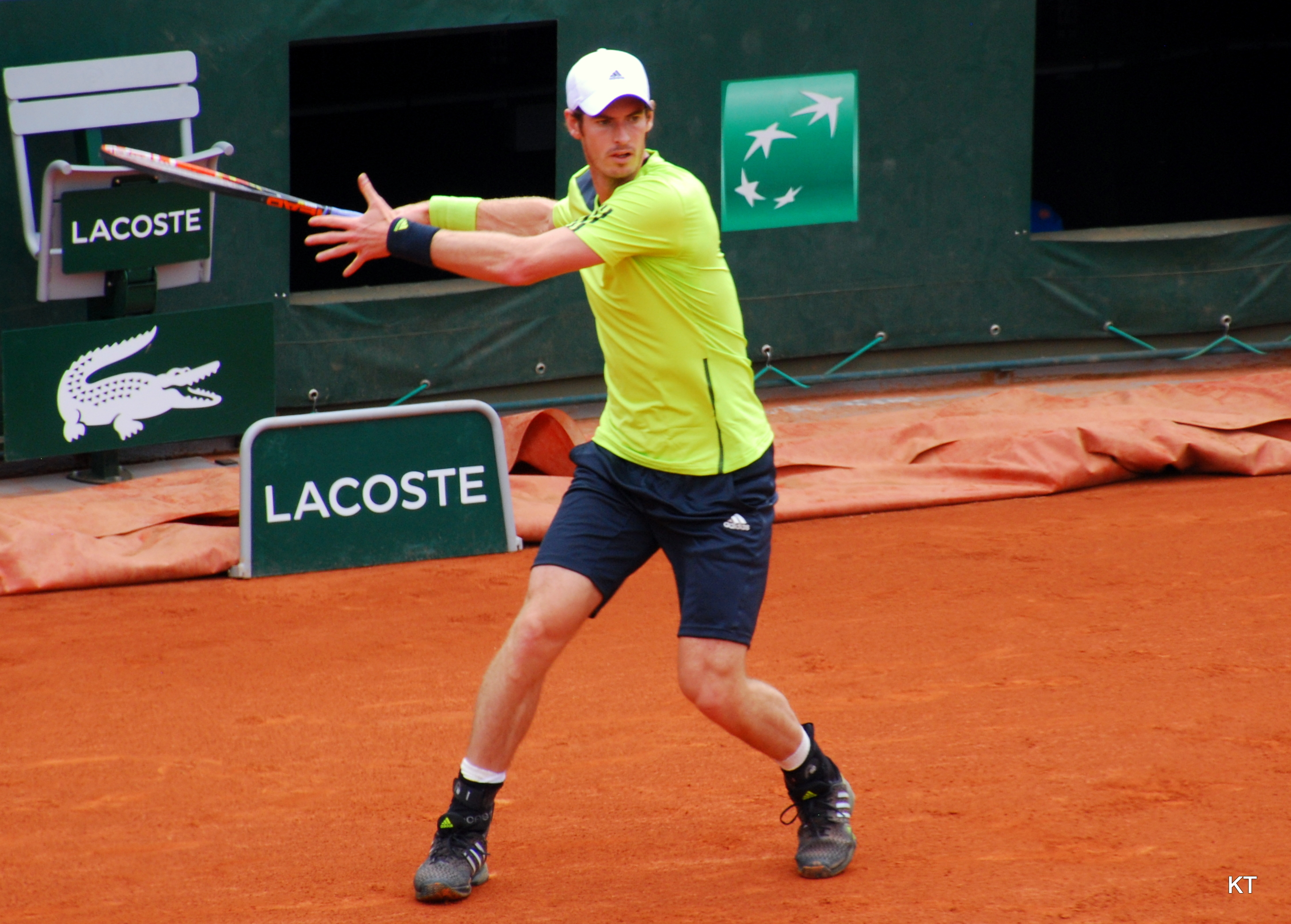
- Murray competing at the French Open
- Full name: Andy Murray
- Country: Great Britain

Singles
- Season record: 59–20
- Calendar titles: 3
- Year-end ranking: No. 6
- Ranking change from previous year: ▼2

Grand Slam & significant results
- Australian Open: QF
- French Open: SF
- Wimbledon: QF
- US Open: QF
- Other tournaments
- Tour Finals: RR

Doubles
- Season record: 3–2
- Calendar titles: 0
- Current ranking: No. 330
- Ranking change from previous year: ▼222

Davis Cup
- Davis Cup: QF
- Last updated on: 15 November 2014.

The 2014 Andy Murray tennis season began at the Qatar Open. He was defending titles in Miami and at Queen's Club, as well as at Wimbledon. However, he failed to retain any of these, losing to Novak Djokovic, Radek Štěpánek and Grigor Dimitrov at each of these tournaments.

His form improved in the latter part of the season, as he won 3 titles in 5 weeks at Shenzhen, Vienna and Valencia. This saw him finish the year ranked world number 6.

== Yearly Summary ==
=== Australian Open Series ===
==== Qatar Open ====
Murray made his competitive return to the tour at the Qatar Open, having been out injured since undergoing back surgery in September 2013. He faced local wildcard Mousa Shanan Zayed and took only 37 minutes to defeat him, not dropping a single game in the process. He then suffered a shock defeat to Florian Mayer in the following round. Having been in a commanding position, Murray lost 12 of the last 15 games to crash out in three sets.

==== Australian Open ====
Murray then competed at the Australian Open. He got his campaign underway in difficult conditions, with temperatures in excess of 40 degrees Celsius, against Go Soeda and saw him off in under 90 minutes, only dropping five games in the process. He next faced qualifier Vincent Millot and again won in straight sets, recovering from 5–1 down in the third to take it 7–5 by winning 23 consecutive points from set point down. Murray's first serious test came from Feliciano López but the top 30 player failed to trouble him as he secured another set victory, to set up a fourth round clash with lucky loser Stéphane Robert. Murray dropped his first set of the tournament in a third set tie-break but recovered to take the fourth and progress to the quarter-finals. There he faced Roger Federer, in their fifth meeting at a Grand Slam. Murray was unable to match Federer's level throughout most of the match and was defeated in four sets, ending his run of four consecutive Australian Open semi-finals.

=== Spring hardcourt season ===
==== Davis Cup First round ====
Murray then represented Great Britain in the Davis Cup against the United States in San Diego. He won both his singles rubbers, first defeating Donald Young and then securing the 3–1 victory on the Sunday with a win over Sam Querrey. It was the first time that Great Britain had reached the quarterfinals of the Davis Cup since 1986.

==== Rotterdam Open ====
Following the Davis Cup tie, Murray travelled to Rotterdam to play in the Rotterdam Open. There he overcame Édouard Roger-Vasselin and Dominic Thiem to set up a quarter-final encounter with Marin Čilić. Murray struggled against Čilić, playing for the three consecutive days for the first time since surgery, and was unable to find his best form as he crashed out in straight sets.

==== Mexican Open ====
After his defeat to Čilić, Murray next chose to play in the Mexican Open for the first time. He recovered from a set down in his opener to defeat Pablo Andújar, and then overcame João Sousa to reach the quarter-finals. Again, Murray failed to find his best form but still managed to record his 12th consecutive win over Gilles Simon. In his first semi-final since winning Wimbledon the previous year, Murray suffered a three sets defeat to Grigor Dimitrov. Murray took the first set but then lost two close tie-breaks as Dimitorv recorded his first win over Murray.

==== Indian Wells Masters ====
Murray headed into the first Masters Series tournament of the year still struggling to find form. Matters failed to improve at the Indian Wells Masters as he struggled past Lukáš Rosol and Jiří Veselý, before being eliminated in the fourth round by Milos Raonic in a match where Murray admitted he "wasn't good enough". Following the tournament, Murray mutually split with his coach Ivan Lendl, ending their partnership after two years together.

Murray offered to play with 2012 Wimbledon Doubles champion Jonathan Marray because Marray was unable to convince anyone to join him on court. Marray was struggling for full fitness and finding a regular doubles partner, travelling to tournaments with no plan whatsoever. After fans queued around the grounds to watch Roger Federer and Stanislas Wawrinka play together, it was standing room only for Murray and Marray's first competitive match together. Andy Murray and Jonny Marray won a thrilling doubles clash against Gaël Monfils and Juan Mónaco only to lose in the second round to the No 2 seeds Alexander Peya and Bruno Soares.

==== Miami Masters ====
At the Miami Masters Murray began his title defence with a win over Matthew Ebden, recovering to take 12 of the last 13 games having lost the first set. Murray then turned in two of his better performances of the season to defeat Feliciano López and Jo-Wilfried Tsonga to reach the quarter-finals. The win over Tsonga was Murray's first victory over a top-20 player since his return from surgery. In the quarter-finals Murray took on Novak Djokovic for the first time since they played each other in the previous year's Wimbledon final. Murray was defeated in straight sets although the first set ended in controversial fashion with Djokovic playing a volley with his racquet over the net which the umpire allowed to stand. The defeat saw Murray slip to eighth in the world, his lowest ranking since 2008.

=== European clay court season ===
==== Davis Cup Quarterfinals ====
Great Britain faced Italy in the Davis Cup quarter-finals. Murray defeated Andreas Seppi in his opening rubber, although the conclusion of the match was delayed until the Saturday following a rain delay. Murray then had to play again on the Saturday as he teamed up with fellow Scot Colin Fleming to defeat Simone Bolelli and Fabio Fognini in the doubles rubber and put Britain 2–1 up. On the Sunday, Murray had to play his third best of five match in the space of two days as he took on Fognini in the reverse singles. The intense schedule proved too much for Murray as he was defeated in straight sets, ending his run of 19 consecutive Davis Cup singles wins which stretched back to his first appearance in the competition in 2005. James Ward then lost the decider to Seppi as Britain were defeated 3–2 and eliminated from the competition.

==== Madrid Open ====
Murray's first clay court tournament of the year was the Madrid Open. Murray opened up with a close three set victory over Nicolás Almagro, but his poor form on clay continued as he lost to qualifier Santiago Giraldo in the following round.

==== Italian Open ====
The Italian Open seemed to signal an upturn in Murray's fortunes. He first dismissed Marcel Granollers in straight sets, and was then equally as clinical as he celebrated his 27th birthday with a win over Jürgen Melzer to set up a quarter-final meeting with Rafael Nadal. In their first meeting since October 2011, Murray seized the early initiative and took the first set 6–1, but Nadal battled back to take the second. In the decider, Murray moved out to a 4–2 lead and was within touching distance of recording his first win over Nadal on clay. However, he was unable to see the match out and Nadal recovered to take the third 7–5.

==== French Open ====
Murray began his French Open with a four sets win over Andrey Golubev, and then defeated Marinko Matosevic to set up a third round match with Philipp Kohlschreiber. The 28th seeded German proved a much tougher prospect and after Murray failed to see out the match from a commanding position in the fourth set, play was abandoned due to bad light at 7–7 in the deciding fifth set. Despite having never been beyond 7–5 in a decider, Murray held his nerve to take it 12–10 when play resumed the following day. He then returned the next day to take on Fernando Verdasco, but this match proved less troublesome with Murray picking up the win in straight sets. In the quarter-finals, Murray played childhood friend Gaël Monfils and stormed into a two set lead. Monfils hit back though, winning the next two to take it to a decider. Despite the momentum seeming to be against Murray, he turned the match round spectacularly to take the final set 6–0 and reach the semi-finals, equalling his best ever result at the French Open. The result saw him become only the 10th man to reach multiple semi-finals at all four Grand Slams and also reach a British-record 14th Grand Slam semi-final. In the semi-finals he faced Rafael Nadal for the second consecutive tournament. Nadal was at his best throughout the match and Murray struggled to keep up, weakened by the two long, five-set matches he had already played. In the end, Nadal saw off Murray in under two hours, winning comfortably in straight sets.

=== Grass court season ===
==== Queen's Club Championships ====
Prior to the grass court season beginning, Murray appointed Amélie Mauresmo as his new coach. It was a surprise move which saw Mauresmo become the first woman to coach a high-profile male player. In their first tournament together, Murray recorded a straight sets win over Paul-Henri Mathieu as he attempted to defend his Queen's Club Championship title. However, he suffered a shock defeat to Radek Štěpánek in the following round, ending his 19 match win streak which stretched back to his 2012 Wimbledon final defeat to Roger Federer.

==== Wimbledon ====
Murray then attempted to become the first British man to defend a Wimbledon title since Fred Perry in 1936. He began his defence with a comfortable straight sets win over David Goffin, his 450th career win, and followed that up with an emphatic win over Blaž Rola in which he only dropped two games. His first real test was against 27th seed Roberto Bautista Agut, but the Spaniard proved no match for Murray who raced to another straight sets win in just over an hour and a half. Murray then defeated big serving Kevin Anderson, the 20th seed, to reach his seventh consecutive Wimbledon quarter-final. His defence then came to an abrupt halt as Grigor Dimitrov ended his 17 match winning-streak at Wimbledon with a straight sets win, meaning Murray failed to reach the semi-finals for the first time since 2008.

=== US Open Series ===
==== Canadian Open ====
Despite his ranking dropping to 10th after Wimbledon, withdrawals from Nadal and del Potro meant that Murray was seeded eighth for the Canadian Open and thus received a first round bye. Before the tournament began, Murray announced that he would be extending his partnership with Mauresmo until at least the end of the US Open but was ideally looking for a long-term deal. Murray also revealed that he hadn't been able to train fully earlier in the year following his back surgery last September, but had now returned to a full training schedule. In his opening match at the Canadian Open he faced wild card Nick Kyrgios, who had also been a Wimbledon quarter-finalist after upsetting Rafael Nadal. However, Murray faced no such issues with the Australian teenager and recorded a straight sets win in just under an hour. Murray then advanced to the quarter-finals after Richard Gasquet withdrew before their third round match with an abdominal injury. Murray was defeated at the quarter-final stage by eventual champion Jo-Wilfried Tsonga, despite having been a break up in the final set.

==== Cincinnati Masters ====
As with the Canadian Open, Murray received a first round bye at the Cincinnati Masters as the eight seed. He recorded a straight sets win over João Sousa in the second round, and then in the third round defeated 2013 finalist John Isner in a third set tie-break, having earlier saved two match points. He faced world No. 3 Roger Federer for a place in the semi-finals, but was defeated in straight sets. Murray had a double-break lead in the second set, but lost six of the last seven games to exit the tournament. As with the previous tournament, Murray lost to the eventual winner, with Federer going on to take the title two days later.

==== US Open ====
Murray went into the US Open as the eighth seed, his lowest seeding at a major since Wimbledon 2008. In the first round he faced Robin Haase where he looked to be heading for a routine straight sets victory. However, early in the third set, Murray suffered a bout of cramp and Haase was able to claw his way back into the match. It looked to be going all the way to a deciding set but Murray was able to come back from a break down to take the match in four. In the second round Murray defeated qualifier Matthias Bachinger in straight sets to set up a first meeting with Andrey Kuznetsov in the third round. He came through that encounter in four sets to set up a third meeting of the season with Jo-Wilfried Tsonga. Murray won in straight sets to record his first win over a top 10 player since his 2013 Wimbledon final victory over Novak Djokovic. It was Djokovic who he faced at the quarter-final stage of the tournament. In their 21st meeting the Serb proved to be too much for Murray, taking the win in four sets in a late match that lasted over three and a half hours.

=== Post–US Open tournaments ===
==== Shenzhen Open ====
Murray played his first tournament after the US Open when he took a wildcard into the Shenzhen Open, as the second seed. After receiving a bye in the first round he defeated Somdev Devvarman in the round of sixteen in straight sets to set up a quarter-final meeting with Lukáš Lacko. Murray again won in straight sets to reach the semi-finals. Murray had to recover from a set down to overcome Juan Mónaco and advance to his first final since winning Wimbledon the previous year. Murray picked up his first title of the season against Tommy Robredo, coming back after being a set down once again and saving five match points in the process.

==== China Open ====
The following week, Murray faced Jerzy Janowicz in the first round of the China Open, winning in three sets. In the second round he faced Pablo Cuevas, winning easily in straight sets, to set up a quarter-final meeting with US Open champion Marin Čilić. Murray obtained his second top 10 win of the season with a comfortable straight sets win. He then lost to world no. 1 Novak Djokovic in the semi-final in straight sets.

==== Shanghai Masters ====
Murray began the final leg of the Asian swing with a straight sets win over qualifier Teymuraz Gabashvili at the Shanghai Masters. Murray then faced Jerzy Janowicz for the second consecutive tournament, but this match proved to be easier than their previous encounter, with Murray winning in straight sets. His run was ended in third round by David Ferrer, as the fifth seed recovered from a set down to beat Murray in three sets.

==== Vienna Open ====
In an attempt to qualify for the World Tour Finals, Murray took a wild card into the Vienna Open. He defeated Vasek Pospisil in straight sets after receiving a first round bye to reach the quarter-final. More straight sets wins over Jan-Lennard Struff and Viktor Troicki followed as Murray reached the final. He once again faced David Ferrer, and triumphed in three sets for his second title of the season, and the 30th of his career.

==== Valencia Open ====
Continuing his attempt to qualify for the World Tour Finals, Murray entered the Valencia Open as a wild card. He defeated Jürgen Melzer and Fabio Fognini in straight sets to reach the quarter-finals, where he recovered from a set down against Kevin Anderson. In the semi-final he faced David Ferrer for the third time in as many weeks, and won in straight sets to set up a repeat of the Shenzhen Open final against Tommy Robredo. Murray defeated Robredo to take the title, and, in a repeat of the Shenzhen final, had to come from a set behind and save 5 match points to prevail.

==== Paris Masters ====
As the eighth seed, Murray received a bye in the first round of the Paris Masters. He opened with a straight sets win over Julien Benneteau in the second round. Murray then defeated Grigor Dimitrov in just over an hour to advance to the quarter-finals and seal his place at the end of season tour finals. Murray then attempted to record his first win of the season over Novak Djokovic, but it was the Serb who again came out on top in their fourth meeting, in what was also Murray's 23rd match in the space of 37 days.

==== ATP World Tour Finals ====
Murray was drawn in Group B at the ATP World Tour Finals, along with Roger Federer, Kei Nishikori and Milos Raonic. In his opening match, Murray was defeated in straight sets by Nishikori. It was his first loss to him, with Murray having won their previous three meetings. He bounced back in his second match, overcoming Raonic in straight sets. Murray went into his final group match with Federer knowing that a straight sets win was required in order to reach the semi-finals. However, he was thrashed in under an hour, winning only one game, and so was eliminated – finishing third in the group.

== All matches ==
This table chronicles all the matches of Murray in 2014, including walkovers (W/O) which the ATP does not count as wins. They are marked ND for non-decision or no decision.

Key
W	F	SF	QF	#R	RR	Q#	P#	DNQ	A	Z#	PO	G	S	B	NMS	NTI	P	NH

(W) winner; (F) finalist; (SF) semifinalist; (QF) quarterfinalist; (#R) rounds 4, 3, 2, 1; (RR) round-robin stage; (Q#) qualification round; (P#) preliminary round; (DNQ) did not qualify; (A) absent; (Z#) Davis/Fed Cup Zonal Group (with number indication) or (PO) play-off; (G) gold, (S) silver or (B) bronze Olympic/Paralympic medal; (NMS) not a Masters tournament; (NTI) not a Tier I tournament; (P) postponed; (NH) not held; (SR) strike rate (events won / competed); (W–L) win–loss record.
To avoid confusion and double counting, these charts are updated at the conclusion of a tournament or when the player's participation has ended.

=== Singles matches ===
Tournament	Match	Round	Opponent (seed or key)	Rank	Result	Score
Qatar ExxonMobil Open; Doha, Qatar; ATP 250; Hard, outdoor 30 December 2013 – 5 January 2014
Qatar ExxonMobil Open; Doha, Qatar; ATP 250; Hard, outdoor 30 December 2013 – 5 January 2014	1	1R	(Qatar) Mousa Shanan Zayed (WC)	2129	Win	6–0, 6–0
Qatar ExxonMobil Open; Doha, Qatar; ATP 250; Hard, outdoor 30 December 2013 – 5 January 2014	2	2R	(Germany) Florian Mayer	40	Loss	6–3, 4–6, 2–6
Australian Open; Melbourne, Australia; Grand Slam tournament Hard, outdoor 13–26 January 2014
Australian Open; Melbourne, Australia; Grand Slam tournament Hard, outdoor 13–26 January 2014	3	1R	(Japan) Go Soeda	112	Win	6–1, 6–1, 6–3
Australian Open; Melbourne, Australia; Grand Slam tournament Hard, outdoor 13–26 January 2014	4	2R	(France) Vincent Millot (Q)	267	Win	6–2, 6–2, 7–5
Australian Open; Melbourne, Australia; Grand Slam tournament Hard, outdoor 13–26 January 2014	5	3R	(Spain) Feliciano López (26)	27	Win	7–6^{(7–2)}, 6–4, 6–2
Australian Open; Melbourne, Australia; Grand Slam tournament Hard, outdoor 13–26 January 2014	6	4R	(France) Stéphane Robert (LL)	119	Win	6–1, 6–2, 6–7^{(6–8)}, 6–2
Australian Open; Melbourne, Australia; Grand Slam tournament Hard, outdoor 13–26 January 2014	7	QF	(Switzerland) Roger Federer (6)	6	Loss	3–6, 4–6, 7–6^{(8–6)}, 3–6
Davis Cup World Group; San Diego, United States; Davis Cup; Clay, outdoor 31 January – 2 February 2014
Davis Cup World Group; San Diego, United States; Davis Cup; Clay, outdoor 31 January – 2 February 2014	8	1R; R1	(United States) Donald Young	79	Win	6–1, 6–2, 6–3
Davis Cup World Group; San Diego, United States; Davis Cup; Clay, outdoor 31 January – 2 February 2014	9	1R; R4	(United States) Sam Querrey	49	Win	7–6^{(7–5)}, 6–7^{(5–7)}, 6–1, 6–3
ABN AMRO World Tennis Tournament; Rotterdam, Netherlands; ATP 500; Hard, indoor 10–16 February 2014
ABN AMRO World Tennis Tournament; Rotterdam, Netherlands; ATP 500; Hard, indoor 10–16 February 2014	10	1R	(France) Édouard Roger-Vasselin	35	Win	6–3, 6–3
ABN AMRO World Tennis Tournament; Rotterdam, Netherlands; ATP 500; Hard, indoor 10–16 February 2014	11	2R	(Austria) Dominic Thiem (Q)	113	Win	6–4, 3–6, 6–3
ABN AMRO World Tennis Tournament; Rotterdam, Netherlands; ATP 500; Hard, indoor 10–16 February 2014	12	QF	(Croatia) Marin Čilić	37	Loss	3–6, 4–6
Abierto Mexicano Telcel; Acapulco, Mexico; ATP 500; Hard, outdoor 24 February – 1 March 2014
Abierto Mexicano Telcel; Acapulco, Mexico; ATP 500; Hard, outdoor 24 February – 1 March 2014	13	1R	(Spain) Pablo Andújar	34	Win	3–6, 6–1, 6–2
Abierto Mexicano Telcel; Acapulco, Mexico; ATP 500; Hard, outdoor 24 February – 1 March 2014	14	2R	(Portugal) João Sousa	44	Win	6–3, 6–4
Abierto Mexicano Telcel; Acapulco, Mexico; ATP 500; Hard, outdoor 24 February – 1 March 2014	15	QF	(France) Gilles Simon (6)	23	Win	1–6, 7–6^{(7–4)}, 6–2
Abierto Mexicano Telcel; Acapulco, Mexico; ATP 500; Hard, outdoor 24 February – 1 March 2014	16	SF	(Bulgaria) Grigor Dimitrov (4)	22	Loss	6–4, 6–7^{(5–7)}, 6–7^{(3–7)}
BNP Paribas Open; Indian Wells, United States; ATP 1000; Hard, outdoor 3–16 March 2014
BNP Paribas Open; Indian Wells, United States; ATP 1000; Hard, outdoor 3–16 March 2014	–	1R	Bye			
BNP Paribas Open; Indian Wells, United States; ATP 1000; Hard, outdoor 3–16 March 2014	17	2R	(Czech Republic) Lukáš Rosol	47	Win	4–6, 6–3, 6–2
BNP Paribas Open; Indian Wells, United States; ATP 1000; Hard, outdoor 3–16 March 2014	18	3R	(Czech Republic) Jiří Veselý	77	Win	6–7^{(2–7)}, 6–4, 6–4
BNP Paribas Open; Indian Wells, United States; ATP 1000; Hard, outdoor 3–16 March 2014	19	4R	(Canada) Milos Raonic (10)	11	Loss	6–4, 5–7, 3–6
Sony Open Tennis; Miami, United States; ATP 1000; Hard, outdoor 17–30 March 2014
Sony Open Tennis; Miami, United States; ATP 1000; Hard, outdoor 17–30 March 2014	–	1R	Bye			
Sony Open Tennis; Miami, United States; ATP 1000; Hard, outdoor 17–30 March 2014	20	2R	(Australia) Matthew Ebden	67	Win	3–6, 6–0, 6–1
Sony Open Tennis; Miami, United States; ATP 1000; Hard, outdoor 17–30 March 2014	21	3R	(Spain) Feliciano López (32)	34	Win	6–4, 6–1
Sony Open Tennis; Miami, United States; ATP 1000; Hard, outdoor 17–30 March 2014	22	4R	(France) Jo-Wilfried Tsonga (11)	11	Win	6–4, 6–1
Sony Open Tennis; Miami, United States; ATP 1000; Hard, outdoor 17–30 March 2014	23	QF	(Serbia) Novak Djokovic (2)	2	Loss	5–7, 3–6
Davis Cup World Group; Naples, Italy; Davis Cup; Clay, outdoor 4–6 April 2014
Davis Cup World Group; Naples, Italy; Davis Cup; Clay, outdoor 4–6 April 2014	24	QF; R2	(Italy) Andreas Seppi	34	Win	6–4, 7–5, 6–3
Davis Cup World Group; Naples, Italy; Davis Cup; Clay, outdoor 4–6 April 2014	25	QF; R4	(Italy) Fabio Fognini	13	Loss	3–6, 3–6, 4–6
Mutua Madrid Open; Madrid, Spain; ATP 1000; Clay, outdoor 5–11 May 2014
Mutua Madrid Open; Madrid, Spain; ATP 1000; Clay, outdoor 5–11 May 2014	–	1R	Bye			
Mutua Madrid Open; Madrid, Spain; ATP 1000; Clay, outdoor 5–11 May 2014	26	2R	(Spain) Nicolás Almagro	24	Win	6–1, 1–6, 6–4
Mutua Madrid Open; Madrid, Spain; ATP 1000; Clay, outdoor 5–11 May 2014	27	3R	(Colombia) Santiago Giraldo (Q)	46	Loss	3–6, 2–6
Internazionali BNL d'Italia; Rome, Italy; ATP 1000; Clay, outdoor 12–18 May 2014
Internazionali BNL d'Italia; Rome, Italy; ATP 1000; Clay, outdoor 12–18 May 2014	–	1R	Bye			
Internazionali BNL d'Italia; Rome, Italy; ATP 1000; Clay, outdoor 12–18 May 2014	28	2R	(Spain) Marcel Granollers	31	Win	6–2, 7–5
Internazionali BNL d'Italia; Rome, Italy; ATP 1000; Clay, outdoor 12–18 May 2014	29	3R	(Austria) Jürgen Melzer	67	Win	7–6^{(7–1)}, 6–4
Internazionali BNL d'Italia; Rome, Italy; ATP 1000; Clay, outdoor 12–18 May 2014	30	QF	(Spain) Rafael Nadal (1)	1	Loss	6–1, 3–6, 5–7
French Open; Paris, France; Grand Slam tournament Clay, outdoor 26 May – 08 June 2014
French Open; Paris, France; Grand Slam tournament Clay, outdoor 26 May – 08 June 2014	31	1R	(Kazakhstan) Andrey Golubev	53	Win	6–1, 6–4, 3–6, 6–3
French Open; Paris, France; Grand Slam tournament Clay, outdoor 26 May – 08 June 2014	32	2R	(Australia) Marinko Matosevic	66	Win	6–3, 6–1, 6–3
French Open; Paris, France; Grand Slam tournament Clay, outdoor 26 May – 08 June 2014	33	3R	(Germany) Philipp Kohlschreiber (28)	24	Win	3–6, 6–3, 6–3, 4–6, 12–10
French Open; Paris, France; Grand Slam tournament Clay, outdoor 26 May – 08 June 2014	34	4R	(Spain) Fernando Verdasco (24)	25	Win	6–4, 7–5, 7–6^{(7–3)}
French Open; Paris, France; Grand Slam tournament Clay, outdoor 26 May – 08 June 2014	35	QF	(France) Gaël Monfils (23)	28	Win	6–4, 6–1, 4–6, 1–6, 6–0
French Open; Paris, France; Grand Slam tournament Clay, outdoor 26 May – 08 June 2014	36	SF	(Spain) Rafael Nadal (1)	1	Loss	3–6, 2–6, 1–6
Queen's Championships; London, United Kingdom; ATP 250; Grass, outdoor 9–16 June 2014
Queen's Championships; London, United Kingdom; ATP 250; Grass, outdoor 9–16 June 2014	–	1R	Bye			
Queen's Championships; London, United Kingdom; ATP 250; Grass, outdoor 9–16 June 2014	37	2R	(France) Paul-Henri Mathieu	92	Win	6–4, 6–4
Queen's Championships; London, United Kingdom; ATP 250; Grass, outdoor 9–16 June 2014	38	3R	(Czech Republic) Radek Štěpánek (15)	42	Loss	6–7^{(10–12)}, 2–6
Wimbledon Championships; London, United Kingdom; Grand Slam tournament Grass, outdoor 23 June – 6 July 2014
Wimbledon Championships; London, United Kingdom; Grand Slam tournament Grass, outdoor 23 June – 6 July 2014	39	1R	(Belgium) David Goffin	105	Win	6–1, 6–4, 7–5
Wimbledon Championships; London, United Kingdom; Grand Slam tournament Grass, outdoor 23 June – 6 July 2014	40	2R	(Slovenia) Blaž Rola	92	Win	6–1, 6–1, 6–0
Wimbledon Championships; London, United Kingdom; Grand Slam tournament Grass, outdoor 23 June – 6 July 2014	41	3R	(Spain) Roberto Bautista Agut (27)	23	Win	6–2, 6–3, 6–2
Wimbledon Championships; London, United Kingdom; Grand Slam tournament Grass, outdoor 23 June – 6 July 2014	42	4R	(South Africa) Kevin Anderson (20)	18	Win	6–4, 6–3, 7–6^{(8–6)}
Wimbledon Championships; London, United Kingdom; Grand Slam tournament Grass, outdoor 23 June – 6 July 2014	43	QF	(Bulgaria) Grigor Dimitrov (11)	13	Loss	1–6, 6–7^{(4–7)}, 2-6
Rogers Cup; Toronto, Canada; ATP 1000; Hard, outdoor 4–10 August 2014
Rogers Cup; Toronto, Canada; ATP 1000; Hard, outdoor 4–10 August 2014	–	1R	Bye			
Rogers Cup; Toronto, Canada; ATP 1000; Hard, outdoor 4–10 August 2014	44	2R	(Australia) Nick Kyrgios (WC)	70	Win	6–2, 6–2
Rogers Cup; Toronto, Canada; ATP 1000; Hard, outdoor 4–10 August 2014	–	3R	(France) Richard Gasquet (12)	13	W/O	N/A
Rogers Cup; Toronto, Canada; ATP 1000; Hard, outdoor 4–10 August 2014	45	QF	(France) Jo-Wilfried Tsonga (13)	15	Loss	6–7^{(5–7)}, 6–4, 4–6
Western & Southern Open; Cincinnati, United States; ATP 1000; Hard, outdoor 11–17 August 2014
Western & Southern Open; Cincinnati, United States; ATP 1000; Hard, outdoor 11–17 August 2014	–	1R	Bye			
Western & Southern Open; Cincinnati, United States; ATP 1000; Hard, outdoor 11–17 August 2014	46	2R	(Portugal) João Sousa	37	Win	6–3, 6–3
Western & Southern Open; Cincinnati, United States; ATP 1000; Hard, outdoor 11–17 August 2014	47	3R	(United States) John Isner (11)	14	Win	6–7^{(3–7)}, 6–4, 7–6^{(7–2)}
Western & Southern Open; Cincinnati, United States; ATP 1000; Hard, outdoor 11–17 August 2014	48	QF	(Switzerland) Roger Federer (2)	3	Loss	3–6, 5–7
US Open; New York City, United States; Grand Slam tournament Hard, outdoor 25 August – 07 September 2014
US Open; New York City, United States; Grand Slam tournament Hard, outdoor 25 August – 07 September 2014	49	1R	(Netherlands) Robin Haase	70	Win	6–3, 7–6^{(8–6)}, 1–6, 7–5
US Open; New York City, United States; Grand Slam tournament Hard, outdoor 25 August – 07 September 2014	50	2R	(Germany) Matthias Bachinger (Q)	235	Win	6–3, 6–3, 6–4
US Open; New York City, United States; Grand Slam tournament Hard, outdoor 25 August – 07 September 2014	51	3R	(Russia) Andrey Kuznetsov	96	Win	6–1, 7–5, 4–6, 6–2
US Open; New York City, United States; Grand Slam tournament Hard, outdoor 25 August – 07 September 2014	52	4R	(France) Jo-Wilfried Tsonga (9)	10	Win	7–5, 7–5, 6–4
US Open; New York City, United States; Grand Slam tournament Hard, outdoor 25 August – 07 September 2014	53	QF	(Serbia) Novak Djokovic(1)	1	Loss	6–7^{(1–7)}, 7–6^{(7–1)}, 2–6, 4–6
Shenzhen Open; Shenzhen, China; ATP 250; Hard, outdoor 22–28 September 2014
Shenzhen Open; Shenzhen, China; ATP 250; Hard, outdoor 22–28 September 2014	–	1R	Bye			
Shenzhen Open; Shenzhen, China; ATP 250; Hard, outdoor 22–28 September 2014	54	2R	(India) Somdev Devvarman	141	Win	6–3, 6–3
Shenzhen Open; Shenzhen, China; ATP 250; Hard, outdoor 22–28 September 2014	55	QF	(Slovakia) Lukáš Lacko	85	Win	6–3, 7–5
Shenzhen Open; Shenzhen, China; ATP 250; Hard, outdoor 22–28 September 2014	56	SF	(Argentina) Juan Mónaco	97	Win	2–6, 6–3, 6–0
Shenzhen Open; Shenzhen, China; ATP 250; Hard, outdoor 22–28 September 2014	57	W	(Spain) Tommy Robredo (4)	22	class="tpl-tennis-tournament-Win (1)" style="text-align:center;" | Win (1)	5–7, 7–6^{(11–9)}, 6–1
China Open; Beijing, China; ATP 500; Hard, outdoor 29 September – 05 October 2014
China Open; Beijing, China; ATP 500; Hard, outdoor 29 September – 05 October 2014	58	1R	(Poland) Jerzy Janowicz	36	Win	6–7^{(9–11)}, 6–4, 6–2
China Open; Beijing, China; ATP 500; Hard, outdoor 29 September – 05 October 2014	59	2R	(Uruguay) Pablo Cuevas	35	Win	6–2, 6–2
China Open; Beijing, China; ATP 500; Hard, outdoor 29 September – 05 October 2014	60	QF	(Croatia) Marin Čilić (4)	9	Win	6–1, 6–4
China Open; Beijing, China; ATP 500; Hard, outdoor 29 September – 05 October 2014	61	SF	(Serbia) Novak Djokovic (1)	1	Loss	3–6, 4–6
Shanghai Rolex Masters; Shanghai, China; ATP 1000; Hard, outdoor 5–12 October 2014
Shanghai Rolex Masters; Shanghai, China; ATP 1000; Hard, outdoor 5–12 October 2014	62	1R	(Russia) Teymuraz Gabashvili (Q)	55	Win	6–1, 7–5
Shanghai Rolex Masters; Shanghai, China; ATP 1000; Hard, outdoor 5–12 October 2014	63	2R	(Poland) Jerzy Janowicz	37	Win	7–5, 6–2
Shanghai Rolex Masters; Shanghai, China; ATP 1000; Hard, outdoor 5–12 October 2014	64	3R	(Spain) David Ferrer (5)	5	Loss	6–2, 1–6, 2–6
Erste Bank Open; Vienna, Austria; ATP 250; Hard, indoor 13–19 October 2014
Erste Bank Open; Vienna, Austria; ATP 250; Hard, indoor 13–19 October 2014	–	1R	Bye			
Erste Bank Open; Vienna, Austria; ATP 250; Hard, indoor 13–19 October 2014	65	2R	(Canada) Vasek Pospisil	44	Win	6–4, 6–4
Erste Bank Open; Vienna, Austria; ATP 250; Hard, indoor 13–19 October 2014	66	QF	(Germany) Jan-Lennard Struff	52	Win	6–2, 7–5
Erste Bank Open; Vienna, Austria; ATP 250; Hard, indoor 13–19 October 2014	67	SF	(Serbia) Viktor Troicki (Q)	127	Win	6–4, 6–3
Erste Bank Open; Vienna, Austria; ATP 250; Hard, indoor 13–19 October 2014	68	W	(Spain) David Ferrer (1/WC)	5	class="tpl-tennis-tournament-Win (2)" style="text-align:center;" | Win (2)	5–7, 6–2, 7–5
Valencia Open 500; Valencia, Spain; ATP 500; Hard, indoor 20–26 October 2014
Valencia Open 500; Valencia, Spain; ATP 500; Hard, indoor 20–26 October 2014	69	1R	(Austria) Jürgen Melzer	121	Win	6–3, 6–3
Valencia Open 500; Valencia, Spain; ATP 500; Hard, indoor 20–26 October 2014	70	2R	(Italy) Fabio Fognini	19	Win	6–2, 6–4
Valencia Open 500; Valencia, Spain; ATP 500; Hard, indoor 20–26 October 2014	71	QF	(South Africa) Kevin Anderson (7)	17	Win	6–7^{(3–7)}, 6–4, 6–4
Valencia Open 500; Valencia, Spain; ATP 500; Hard, indoor 20–26 October 2014	72	SF	(Spain) David Ferrer (1)	5	Win	6–4, 7–5
Valencia Open 500; Valencia, Spain; ATP 500; Hard, indoor 20–26 October 2014	73	W	(Spain) Tommy Robredo	21	class="tpl-tennis-tournament-Win (3)" style="text-align:center;" | Win (3)	3–6, 7–6^{(9–7)}, 7–6^{(10–8)}
BNP Paribas Masters; Paris, France; ATP 1000; Hard, indoor 27 October – 2 November 2014
BNP Paribas Masters; Paris, France; ATP 1000; Hard, indoor 27 October – 2 November 2014	–	1R	Bye			
BNP Paribas Masters; Paris, France; ATP 1000; Hard, indoor 27 October – 2 November 2014	74	2R	(France) Julien Benneteau	28	Win	6–3, 6–4
BNP Paribas Masters; Paris, France; ATP 1000; Hard, indoor 27 October – 2 November 2014	75	3R	(Bulgaria) Grigor Dimitrov (9)	11	Win	6–3, 6–3
BNP Paribas Masters; Paris, France; ATP 1000; Hard, indoor 27 October – 2 November 2014	76	QF	(Serbia) Novak Djokovic (1)	1	Loss	5–7, 2–6
ATP World Tour Finals; London, United Kingdom; ATP Finals; Hard, indoor 9–16 November 2014
ATP World Tour Finals; London, United Kingdom; ATP Finals; Hard, indoor 9–16 November 2014	77	RR	(Japan) Kei Nishikori (4)	5	Loss	4–6, 4–6
ATP World Tour Finals; London, United Kingdom; ATP Finals; Hard, indoor 9–16 November 2014	78	RR	(Canada) Milos Raonic (7)	8	Win	6–3, 7–5
ATP World Tour Finals; London, United Kingdom; ATP Finals; Hard, indoor 9–16 November 2014	79	RR	(Switzerland) Roger Federer (2)	2	Loss	0–6, 1–6

=== Doubles matches ===
Tournament	Match	Round	Opponents (seed or key)	Ranks	Result	Score
Qatar ExxonMobil Open; Doha, Qatar; ATP 250; Hard, outdoor 30 December 2013 – 5 January 2014; Partner: (Serbia) Nenad Zimonjić
Qatar ExxonMobil Open; Doha, Qatar; ATP 250; Hard, outdoor 30 December 2013 – 5 January 2014; Partner: (Serbia) Nenad Zimonjić	1	1R	(Germany) Daniel Brands / (Germany) Florian Mayer	238 / 239	Win	3–6, 7–6^{(7–5)}, [10–8]
Qatar ExxonMobil Open; Doha, Qatar; ATP 250; Hard, outdoor 30 December 2013 – 5 January 2014; Partner: (Serbia) Nenad Zimonjić	2	QF	(Austria) Alexander Peya / (Brazil) Bruno Soares (1)	4 / 3	Loss	6–7^{(5–7)}, 4–6
BNP Paribas Open; Indian Wells, United States; ATP 1000; Hard, outdoor 3–16 March 2014; Partner: (United Kingdom) Jonathan Marray
BNP Paribas Open; Indian Wells, United States; ATP 1000; Hard, outdoor 3–16 March 2014; Partner: (United Kingdom) Jonathan Marray	3	1R	(Argentina) Juan Mónaco / (France) Gaël Monfils	170 / N/A	Win	6–4, 4–6, [11–9]
BNP Paribas Open; Indian Wells, United States; ATP 1000; Hard, outdoor 3–16 March 2014; Partner: (United Kingdom) Jonathan Marray	4	2R	(Austria) Alexander Peya / (Brazil) Bruno Soares (2)	3 / 3	Loss	6–7^{(1–7)}, 3–6
Davis Cup World Group; Naples, Italy; Davis Cup; Clay, outdoor 4–6 April 2014; Partner: (United Kingdom) Colin Fleming
Davis Cup World Group; Naples, Italy; Davis Cup; Clay, outdoor 4–6 April 2014; Partner: (United Kingdom) Colin Fleming	5	QF; R3	(Italy) Simone Bolelli / (Italy) Fabio Fognini	383 / 68	Win	6–3, 6–2, 3–6, 7–5

=== Exhibition matches ===
Tournament	Match	Round	Opponent (Seed or Key)	Rank	Result	Score
Mubadala World Tennis Championship; Abu Dhabi, United Arab Emirates; Exhibition; Hard, outdoor 26–28 December 2013
Mubadala World Tennis Championship; Abu Dhabi, United Arab Emirates; Exhibition; Hard, outdoor 26–28 December 2013	1	QF	(France) Jo-Wilfried Tsonga (6)	10	Loss	5–7, 3–6
Mubadala World Tennis Championship; Abu Dhabi, United Arab Emirates; Exhibition; Hard, outdoor 26–28 December 2013	2	PO	(Switzerland) Stanislas Wawrinka (5)	8	Win	6–3, 6–4

== Tournament schedule ==
=== Singles schedule ===
Date	Championship	Location	Category	Surface	2013 result	2013 points	2014 points	Outcome
30 December 2013– 5 January 2014	Qatar Open	Doha	ATP World Tour 250	Hard	DNS	0	20	Lost in the second round against Florian Mayer
13 January 2014– 26 January 2014	Australian Open	Melbourne	Grand Slam tournament	Hard	F	1,200	360	Lost in the quarterfinals against Roger Federer
31 January 2014– 2 February 2014	Davis Cup: USA vs Great Britain; World Group First Round	San Diego	Davis Cup	Clay	DNS	0	80	First round: (United Kingdom) Great Britain def. United States (def. Donald Young, 6–1, 6–2, 6–3) (def. Sam Querrey, 7–6^{(7–5)}, 6–7^{(5–7)}, 6–1, 6–3)
10 February 2014– 16 February 2014	Rotterdam Open	Rotterdam	ATP World Tour 500	Hard	DNS	0	90	Lost in the quarterfinals against Marin Čilić
24 February 2014– 2 March 2014	Mexican Open	Acapulco	ATP World Tour 500	Hard	DNS	0	180	Lost in the semifinals against Grigor Dimitrov
3 March 2014– 16 March 2014	Indian Wells Masters	Indian Wells	ATP World Tour Masters 1000	Hard	QF	180	90	Lost in the fourth round against Milos Raonic
17 March 2014– 30 March 2014	Miami Masters	Miami	ATP World Tour Masters 1000	Hard	W	1,000	180	Lost in the quarterfinals against Novak Djokovic
4 April 2014– 6 April 2014	Davis Cup: Italy vs Great Britain; World Group Quarterfinal	Naples	Davis Cup	Clay	DNS	0	65	Quarterfinals: Italy def. (United Kingdom) Great Britain (def. Andreas Seppi, 6–4, 7–5, 6–3) (lost to Fabio Fognini, 3–6, 3–6, 4–6)
5 May 2014– 11 May 2014	Madrid Open	Madrid	ATP World Tour Masters 1000	Clay	QF	180	90	Lost in the third round against Santiago Giraldo
12 May 2014– 18 May 2014	Italian Open	Rome	ATP World Tour Masters 1000	Clay	2R	10	180	Lost in the quarterfinals against Rafael Nadal
25 May 2014– 8 June 2014	French Open	Paris	Grand Slam tournament	Clay	A	0	720	Lost in the semifinals against Rafael Nadal
9 June 2014– 15 June 2014	Queen's Club Championships	London	ATP World Tour 250	Grass	W	250	20	Lost in the third round against Radek Štěpánek
23 June 2014– 6 July 2014	Wimbledon	London	Grand Slam tournament	Grass	W	2,000	360	Lost in the quarterfinals against Grigor Dimitrov
4 August 2014– 10 August 2014	Canadian Open	Toronto	ATP World Tour Masters 1000	Hard	3R	90	180	Lost in the quarterfinals against Jo-Wilfried Tsonga
11 August 2014– 17 August 2014	Cincinnati Masters	Cincinnati	ATP World Tour Masters 1000	Hard	QF	180	180	Lost in the quarterfinals against Roger Federer
25 August 2014– 7 September 2014	US Open	New York City	Grand Slam tournament	Hard	QF	360	360	Lost in the quarterfinals against Novak Djokovic
22 September 2014– 28 September 2014	Shenzhen Open	Shenzhen	ATP World Tour 250	Hard	DNS	0	250	Won in the final against Tommy Robredo
29 September 2014– 5 October 2014	China Open	Beijing	ATP World Tour 500	Hard	DNS	0	180	Lost in the semifinals against Novak Djokovic
6 October 2014– 12 October 2014	Shanghai Masters	Shanghai	ATP World Tour Masters 1000	Hard	DNS	0	90	Lost in the third round against David Ferrer
13 October 2014– 19 October 2014	Vienna Open	Vienna	ATP World Tour 250	Hard (i)	DNS	0	250	Won in the final against David Ferrer
20 October 2014– 26 October 2014	Valencia Open	Valencia	ATP World Tour 500	Hard (i)	DNS	0	500	Won in the final against Tommy Robredo
27 October 2014– 2 November 2014	Paris Masters	Paris	ATP World Tour Masters 1000	Hard (i)	DNS	0	180	Lost in the quarterfinals against Novak Djokovic
9 November 2014– 16 November 2014	ATP World Tour Finals	London	ATP World Tour Finals	Hard (i)	DNS	0	200	Did not advance from the group stage

== Yearly records ==
=== Head-to-head matchups ===
Ordered by number of wins (Bold denotes a top 10 player at the time of match, Italic means top 50)

- (Spain) Feliciano López 2–0
- (Portugal) João Sousa 2–0
- (Poland) Jerzy Janowicz 2–0
- (Austria) Jürgen Melzer 2–0
- (South Africa) Kevin Anderson 2–0
- (Spain) Tommy Robredo 2–0
- (France) **Jo-Wilfried Tsonga** 2–1 (Note: Tsonga was ranked in the top 50 for their first two meetings (1–1) but top 10 for their third (1–0).)
- (Spain) **David Ferrer** 2–1
- (Qatar) Mousa Shanan Zayed 1–0
- (Japan) Go Soeda 1–0
- (France) Vincent Millot 1–0
- (France) Stéphane Robert 1–0
- (United States) Donald Young 1–0
- (United States) Sam Querrey 1–0
- (France) Édouard Roger-Vasselin 1–0
- (Austria) Dominic Thiem 1–0
- (Spain) Pablo Andújar 1–0
- (France) Gilles Simon 1–0
- (Czech Republic) Lukáš Rosol 1–0
- (Czech Republic) Jiří Veselý 1–0
- (Australia) Matthew Ebden 1–0
- (Italy) Andreas Seppi 1–0
- (Spain) Nicolás Almagro 1–0
- (Spain) Marcel Granollers 1–0
- (Kazakhstan) Andrey Golubev 1–0
- (Australia) Marinko Matosevic 1–0
- (Germany) Philipp Kohlschreiber 1–0
- (Spain) Fernando Verdasco 1–0
- (France) Gaël Monfils 1–0
- (France) Paul-Henri Mathieu 1–0
- (Belgium) David Goffin 1–0
- (Slovenia) Blaž Rola 1–0
- (Spain) Roberto Bautista Agut 1–0
- (Australia) Nick Kyrgios 1–0
- (United States) John Isner 1–0
- (Netherlands) Robin Haase 1–0
- (Germany) Matthias Bachinger 1–0
- (Russia) Andrey Kuznetsov 1–0
- (India) Somdev Devvarman 1–0
- (Slovakia) Lukáš Lacko 1–0
- (Argentina) Juan Mónaco 1–0
- (Uruguay) Pablo Cuevas 1–0
- (Russia) Teymuraz Gabashvili 1–0
- (Canada) Vasek Pospisil 1–0
- (Germany) Jan-Lennard Struff 1–0
- (Serbia) Viktor Troicki 1–0
- (France) Julien Benneteau 1–0
- **(Croatia) Marin Čilić** 1–1 (Note: Čilić was ranked in the top 50 for their first meeting (0–1) but top 10 for their second (1–0).)
- (Italy) Fabio Fognini 1–1
- **(Canada) Milos Raonic** 1–1 (Note: Raonic was ranked in the top 50 for their first meeting (0–1) but top 10 for their second (1–0).)
- (Bulgaria) Grigor Dimitrov 1–2
- (Germany) Florian Mayer 0–1
- (Colombia) Santiago Giraldo 0–1
- (Czech Republic) Radek Štěpánek 0–1
- (Japan) **Kei Nishikori** 0–1
- (Spain) **Rafael Nadal** 0–2
- (Switzerland) **Roger Federer** 0–3
- (Serbia) **Novak Djokovic** 0–4

=== Finals ===
==== Singles: 3 (3–0) ====
Category Grand Slam (0–0) ATP World Tour Finals (0–0) ATP World Tour Masters 1000 (0–0) ATP World Tour 500 (1–0) ATP World Tour 250 (2–0)	Finals by surface Hard (3–0) Clay (0–0) Grass (0–0)	Finals by setting Outdoors (1–0) Indoors (2–0)

Outcome	No.	Date	Championship	Surface	Opponent in the final	Score in the final
Winner	29.	September 28, 2014	Shenzhen Open, Shenzhen, China	Hard	(Spain) Tommy Robredo	5–7, 7–6^{(11–9)}, 6–1
Winner	30.	October 19, 2014	Vienna Open, Vienna, Austria	Hard (i)	(Spain) David Ferrer	5–7, 6–2, 7–5
Winner	31.	October 26, 2014	Valencia Open, Valencia, Spain	Hard (i)	(Spain) Tommy Robredo	3–6, 7–6^{(9–7)}, 7–6^{(10–8)}

=== Earnings ===
- **Bold** font denotes tournament win

#	Venue	Singles Prize Money	Year-to-date
1.	Qatar Open	$18,060	$18,060
2.	Australian Open	A$270,000	$260,871
3.	Rotterdam Open	€34,085	$307,141
4.	Mexican Open	$67,570	$374,711
5.	Indian Wells Masters	$52,000	$426,711
6.	Miami Masters	$98,130	$524,841
7.	Mutua Madrid Open	€45,530	$587,666
8.	Italian Open	€68,890	$682,438
9.	French Open	€412,500	$1,244,428
10.	Queen's Club Championships	€10,160	$1,258,803
11.	Wimbledon Championships	£226,000	$1,643,184
12.	Canadian Open	$75,155	$1,718,339
13.	Cincinnati Masters	$80,165	$1,798,504
14.	US Open	$370,250	$2,168,754
15.	**Shenzhen Open**	**$106,970**	**$2,275,724**
16.	China Open	$129,000	$2,404,724
17.	Shanghai Masters	$52,035	$2,456,759
18.	**Vienna Open**	**€94,500**	**$2,576,094**
19.	**Valencia Open**	**€390,325**	**$3,073,992**
20.	Paris Masters	€71,700	$3,164,822
21.	ATP World Tour Finals	$310,000	$3,474,822
	Bonus Pool	$430,000	$3,904,822
As of November 17, 2014

=== Awards ===
- Arthur Ashe Humanitarian of the Year

== See also ==
- 2014 ATP World Tour
- 2014 Roger Federer tennis season
- 2014 Rafael Nadal tennis season
- 2014 Novak Djokovic tennis season
- 2014 Stanislas Wawrinka tennis season
- 2014 Marin Čilić tennis season
