= 2014 Stan Wawrinka tennis season =

- Full name: Stan Wawrinka
- Country: Switzerland
- Calendar prize money: $5,582,116

Singles
- Season record: 39–17
- Calendar titles: 4
- Year-end ranking: No. 4
- Ranking change from previous year: ▲4

Grand Slam & significant results
- Australian Open: W
- French Open: 1R
- Wimbledon: QF
- US Open: QF
- Other tournaments
- Tour Finals: SF

Davis Cup
- Davis Cup: W

The 2014 Stan Wawrinka tennis season began at the Chennai Open, where he won the title for the second time in his career. This was followed by victory at the Australian Open, where he defeated defending champion Novak Djokovic in the quarterfinals, followed by victory over world no. 1 Rafael Nadal in the final, to win his first ever Grand Slam title, launching him to a career-high no. 3 in the world, and the Swiss no. 1 (ahead of Roger Federer) for the first time in his career. Additionally, he won his first Masters 1000 title, defeating compatriot Federer in the final after coming back from a set down. During the first half of the season, Wawrinka went a perfect 6–0 against top-10 opponents, including wins against three of the "Big Four" (Djokovic, Nadal, and Federer). He also reached the semifinals of the ATP World Tour Finals for the second time in a row and finished the year helping Switzerland win their first Davis Cup.

He was defending champion in Oeiras, but withdrew before the tournament began.

== All matches ==
This table chronicles all the matches of Stan Wawrinka in 2014, including walkovers (W/O) which the ATP does not count as wins. They are marked ND for non-decision or no decision.

Key
W	F	SF	QF	#R	RR	Q#	P#	DNQ	A	Z#	PO	G	S	B	NMS	NTI	P	NH

(W) winner; (F) finalist; (SF) semifinalist; (QF) quarterfinalist; (#R) rounds 4, 3, 2, 1; (RR) round-robin stage; (Q#) qualification round; (P#) preliminary round; (DNQ) did not qualify; (A) absent; (Z#) Davis/Fed Cup Zonal Group (with number indication) or (PO) play-off; (G) gold, (S) silver or (B) bronze Olympic/Paralympic medal; (NMS) not a Masters tournament; (NTI) not a Tier I tournament; (P) postponed; (NH) not held; (SR) strike rate (events won / competed); (W–L) win–loss record.
To avoid confusion and double counting, these charts are updated at the conclusion of a tournament or when the player's participation has ended.

=== Singles matches ===
Tournament	Match	Round	Opponent (seed or key)	Rank	Result	Score
Aircel Chennai Open; Chennai, India; ATP 250; Hard, outdoor 30 December 2013 – 5 January 2014
Aircel Chennai Open; Chennai, India; ATP 250; Hard, outdoor 30 December 2013 – 5 January 2014	–	1R	Bye			
Aircel Chennai Open; Chennai, India; ATP 250; Hard, outdoor 30 December 2013 – 5 January 2014	1 / 498	2R	(Germany) Benjamin Becker	79	Win	6–3, 6–1
Aircel Chennai Open; Chennai, India; ATP 250; Hard, outdoor 30 December 2013 – 5 January 2014	2 / 499	QF	(Slovenia) Aljaž Bedene	95	Win	6–2, 6–1
Aircel Chennai Open; Chennai, India; ATP 250; Hard, outdoor 30 December 2013 – 5 January 2014	3 / 500	SF	(Canada) Vasek Pospisil (5)	32	Win	6–4, 5–5, ret
Aircel Chennai Open; Chennai, India; ATP 250; Hard, outdoor 30 December 2013 – 5 January 2014	4 / 501	W	(France) Edouard Roger-Vasselin	52	Win (1)	7–5, 6–2
Australian Open; Melbourne, Australia; Grand Slam tournament Hard, outdoor 13 – 26 January 2014
Australian Open; Melbourne, Australia; Grand Slam tournament Hard, outdoor 13 – 26 January 2014	5 / 502	1R	(Kazakhstan) Andrey Golubev	85	Win	6–4, 4–1, ret
Australian Open; Melbourne, Australia; Grand Slam tournament Hard, outdoor 13 – 26 January 2014	6 / 503	2R	(Colombia) Alejandro Falla	87	Win	6–3, 6–3, 6–7^{(7–4)}, 6–4
Australian Open; Melbourne, Australia; Grand Slam tournament Hard, outdoor 13 – 26 January 2014	–	3R	(Canada) Vasek Pospisil (28)	30	W/O	N/A
Australian Open; Melbourne, Australia; Grand Slam tournament Hard, outdoor 13 – 26 January 2014	7 / 504	4R	(Spain) Tommy Robredo (17)	19	Win	6–3, 7–6^{(7–3)}, 7–6^{(7–5)}
Australian Open; Melbourne, Australia; Grand Slam tournament Hard, outdoor 13 – 26 January 2014	8 / 505	QF	(Serbia) Novak Djokovic (2)	2	Win	2–6, 6–4, 6–2, 3–6, 9–7
Australian Open; Melbourne, Australia; Grand Slam tournament Hard, outdoor 13 – 26 January 2014	9 / 506	SF	(Czech Republic) Tomáš Berdych (7)	7	Win	6–3, 6–7^{(1–7)}, 7–6^{(7–3)},7–6^{(7–4)}
Australian Open; Melbourne, Australia; Grand Slam tournament Hard, outdoor 13 – 26 January 2014	10 / 507	W	(Spain) Rafael Nadal (1)	1	Win (2)	6–3, 6–2, 3–6, 6–3
Davis Cup World Group; Novi Sad, Serbia; Davis Cup; Hard, indoor 31 January – 2 February 2014
Davis Cup World Group; Novi Sad, Serbia; Davis Cup; Hard, indoor 31 January – 2 February 2014	11 / 508	R2	(Serbia) Dušan Lajović	102	Win	6–4, 4–6, 6–1, 7–6^{(9–7)}
BNP Paribas Open; Indian Wells, United States; ATP 1000; Hard, outdoor 3 – 16 March 2014
BNP Paribas Open; Indian Wells, United States; ATP 1000; Hard, outdoor 3 – 16 March 2014	–	1R	Bye			
BNP Paribas Open; Indian Wells, United States; ATP 1000; Hard, outdoor 3 – 16 March 2014	12 / 509	2R	(Croatia) Ivo Karlović	51	Win	6–3, 7–5
BNP Paribas Open; Indian Wells, United States; ATP 1000; Hard, outdoor 3 – 16 March 2014	13 / 510	3R	(Italy) Andreas Seppi (29)	32	Win	6–0, 6–2
BNP Paribas Open; Indian Wells, United States; ATP 1000; Hard, outdoor 3 – 16 March 2014	14 / 511	4R	(South Africa) Kevin Anderson (17)	18	Loss	6–7^{(1–7)}, 6–4, 1–6
Sony Open Tennis; Miami, United States; ATP 1000; Hard, outdoor 17 – 30 March 2014
Sony Open Tennis; Miami, United States; ATP 1000; Hard, outdoor 17 – 30 March 2014	–	1R	Bye			
Sony Open Tennis; Miami, United States; ATP 1000; Hard, outdoor 17 – 30 March 2014	15 / 512	2R	(Spain) Daniel Gimeno Traver	99	Win	6–0, 3–6, 6–3
Sony Open Tennis; Miami, United States; ATP 1000; Hard, outdoor 17 – 30 March 2014	16 / 513	3R	(France) Edouard Roger-Vasselin	43	Win	7–5, 6–4
Sony Open Tennis; Miami, United States; ATP 1000; Hard, outdoor 17 – 30 March 2014	17 / 514	4R	(Ukraine) Alexandr Dolgopolov (22)	23	Loss	4–6, 6–4, 1–6
Davis Cup World Group; Geneva, Switzerland; Davis Cup; Hard, indoor 4 – 6 April 2014
Davis Cup World Group; Geneva, Switzerland; Davis Cup; Hard, indoor 4 – 6 April 2014	18 / 515	R1	(Kazakhstan) Andrey Golubev	64	Loss	6–7^{(5–7)}, 2–6, 6–3, 6–7^{(5–7)}
Davis Cup World Group; Geneva, Switzerland; Davis Cup; Hard, indoor 4 – 6 April 2014	19 / 516	R4	(Kazakhstan) Mikhail Kukushkin	56	Win	6–7^{(4–7)}, 6–4, 6–4, 6–4
Monte-Carlo Rolex Masters; Roquebrune-Cap-Martin, France; ATP 1000; Clay, outdoor 12 – 20 April 2014
Monte-Carlo Rolex Masters; Roquebrune-Cap-Martin, France; ATP 1000; Clay, outdoor 12 – 20 April 2014	–	1R	Bye			
Monte-Carlo Rolex Masters; Roquebrune-Cap-Martin, France; ATP 1000; Clay, outdoor 12 – 20 April 2014	20 / 517	2R	(Croatia) Marin Čilić	27	Win	6–0, 6–2
Monte-Carlo Rolex Masters; Roquebrune-Cap-Martin, France; ATP 1000; Clay, outdoor 12 – 20 April 2014	–	3R	(Spain) Nicolás Almagro (15)	20	W/O	N/A
Monte-Carlo Rolex Masters; Roquebrune-Cap-Martin, France; ATP 1000; Clay, outdoor 12 – 20 April 2014	21 / 518	QF	(Canada) Milos Raonic (8)	10	Win	7–6^{(7–5)}, 6–2
Monte-Carlo Rolex Masters; Roquebrune-Cap-Martin, France; ATP 1000; Clay, outdoor 12 – 20 April 2014	22 / 519	SF	(Spain) David Ferrer (5)	6	Win	6–1, 7–6^{(7–3)}
Monte-Carlo Rolex Masters; Roquebrune-Cap-Martin, France; ATP 1000; Clay, outdoor 12 – 20 April 2014	23 / 520	W	(Switzerland) Roger Federer (4/WC)	5	Win (3)	4–6, 7–6^{(7–5)}, 6–2
Mutua Madrid Open; Madrid, Spain; ATP 1000; Clay, outdoor 5 – 11 May 2014
Mutua Madrid Open; Madrid, Spain; ATP 1000; Clay, outdoor 5 – 11 May 2014	–	1R	Bye			
Mutua Madrid Open; Madrid, Spain; ATP 1000; Clay, outdoor 5 – 11 May 2014	24 / 521	2R	(Austria) Dominic Thiem (Q)	70	Loss	6–1, 2–6, 4–6
Internazionali BNL d'Italia; Rome, Italy; ATP 1000; Clay, outdoor 12 – 18 May 2014
Internazionali BNL d'Italia; Rome, Italy; ATP 1000; Clay, outdoor 12 – 18 May 2014	–	1R	Bye			
Internazionali BNL d'Italia; Rome, Italy; ATP 1000; Clay, outdoor 12 – 18 May 2014	25 / 522	2R	(Spain) Pere Riba (Q)	98	Win	6–0, 6–3
Internazionali BNL d'Italia; Rome, Italy; ATP 1000; Clay, outdoor 12 – 18 May 2014	26 / 523	3R	(Germany) Tommy Haas	67	Loss	7–5, 2–6, 3–6
French Open; Paris, France; Grand Slam tournament Clay, outdoor 26 May – 8 June 2014
French Open; Paris, France; Grand Slam tournament Clay, outdoor 26 May – 8 June 2014	27 / 524	1R	(Spain) Guillermo García-López	39	Loss	4–6, 7–5, 2–6, 0–6
Queen's Club Championships; London, United Kingdom; ATP 250; Grass, outdoor 9–15 June 2014
Queen's Club Championships; London, United Kingdom; ATP 250; Grass, outdoor 9–15 June 2014	–	1R	Bye			
Queen's Club Championships; London, United Kingdom; ATP 250; Grass, outdoor 9–15 June 2014	28 / 525	2R	(Cyprus) Marcos Baghdatis (WC)	118	Win	3–2, ret.
Queen's Club Championships; London, United Kingdom; ATP 250; Grass, outdoor 9–15 June 2014	29 / 526	3R	(United States) Sam Querrey	78	Win	6–2, 6–2
Queen's Club Championships; London, United Kingdom; ATP 250; Grass, outdoor 9–15 June 2014	30 / 527	QF	(Australia) Marinko Matosevic	60	Win	7–5, 6–3
Queen's Club Championships; London, United Kingdom; ATP 250; Grass, outdoor 9–15 June 2014	31 / 528	SF	(Bulgaria) Grigor Dimitrov	13	Loss	2–6, 4–6
Wimbledon Championships; London, United Kingdom; Grand Slam tournament Grass, outdoor 23 June – 6 July 2014
Wimbledon Championships; London, United Kingdom; Grand Slam tournament Grass, outdoor 23 June – 6 July 2014	32 / 529	1R	(Portugal) João Sousa	48	Win	6–3, 6–4, 6–3
Wimbledon Championships; London, United Kingdom; Grand Slam tournament Grass, outdoor 23 June – 6 July 2014	33 / 530	2R	(Chinese Taipei) Lu Yen-hsun	47	Win	7–6^{(8–6)}, 6–3, 3–6, 7–5
Wimbledon Championships; London, United Kingdom; Grand Slam tournament Grass, outdoor 23 June – 6 July 2014	34 / 531	3R	(Uzbekistan) Denis Istomin	45	Win	6–3, 6–3, 6–4
Wimbledon Championships; London, United Kingdom; Grand Slam tournament Grass, outdoor 23 June – 6 July 2014	35 / 532	4R	(Spain) Feliciano López	25	Win	7–6^{(7–5)}, 7–6^{(9–7)}, 6–3
Wimbledon Championships; London, United Kingdom; Grand Slam tournament Grass, outdoor 23 June – 6 July 2014	36 / 533	QF	(Switzerland) Roger Federer	4	Loss	6–3, 6–7^{(5–7)}, 4–6, 4–6
Rogers Cup; Toronto, Canada; ATP 1000; Hard, outdoor 4 – 10 August 2014
Rogers Cup; Toronto, Canada; ATP 1000; Hard, outdoor 4 – 10 August 2014	–	1R	Bye			
Rogers Cup; Toronto, Canada; ATP 1000; Hard, outdoor 4 – 10 August 2014	37 / 534	2R	(France) Benoît Paire (Q)	98	Win	4–6, 6–3, 7–6^{(7–2)}
Rogers Cup; Toronto, Canada; ATP 1000; Hard, outdoor 4 – 10 August 2014	38 / 535	3R	(South Africa) Kevin Anderson	21	Loss	6–7^{(8–10)}, 5–7
Cincinnati Masters; Cincinnati, United States; ATP 1000; Hard, outdoor 11 – 17 August 2014
Cincinnati Masters; Cincinnati, United States; ATP 1000; Hard, outdoor 11 – 17 August 2014	–	1R	Bye			
Cincinnati Masters; Cincinnati, United States; ATP 1000; Hard, outdoor 11 – 17 August 2014	39 / 536	2R	(Germany) Benjamin Becker (Q)	56	Win	6–3, 7–6^{(7–4)}
Cincinnati Masters; Cincinnati, United States; ATP 1000; Hard, outdoor 11 – 17 August 2014	40 / 537	3R	(Croatia) Marin Čilić (14)	18	Win	3–6, 6–0, 6–1
Cincinnati Masters; Cincinnati, United States; ATP 1000; Hard, outdoor 11 – 17 August 2014	41 / 538	QF	(France) Julien Benneteau	47	Loss	6–1, 1–6, 2–6
US Open; New York, United States; Grand Slam tournament Hard, outdoor 25 July – 8 September 2014
US Open; New York, United States; Grand Slam tournament Hard, outdoor 25 July – 8 September 2014	42 / 539	1R	(Czech Republic) Jiří Veselý	75	Win	6–2, 7–6^{(8–6)}, 7–6^{(7–3)}
US Open; New York, United States; Grand Slam tournament Hard, outdoor 25 July – 8 September 2014	43 / 540	2R	(Brazil) Thomaz Bellucci	91	Win	6–3, 6–4, 3–6, 7–6^{(7–1)}
US Open; New York, United States; Grand Slam tournament Hard, outdoor 25 July – 8 September 2014	–	3R	(Slovenia) Blaž Kavčič	92	W/O	N/A
US Open; New York, United States; Grand Slam tournament Hard, outdoor 25 July – 8 September 2014	44 / 541	4R	(Spain) Tommy Robredo (17)	18	Win	7–5, 4–6, 7–6^{(9–7)}, 6–2
US Open; New York, United States; Grand Slam tournament Hard, outdoor 25 July – 8 September 2014	45 / 542	QF	(Japan) Kei Nishikori (10)	11	Loss	6–3, 5–7, 6–7^{(7–9)}, 7–6^{(7–5)}, 4–6
Davis Cup World Group; Geneva, Switzerland; Davis Cup; Hard, indoor 12 – 14 September 2014
Davis Cup World Group; Geneva, Switzerland; Davis Cup; Hard, indoor 12 – 14 September 2014	46 / 543	R2	(Italy) Fabio Fognini	17	Win	6–2, 6–3, 6–2
Japan Open; Tokyo, Japan; ATP 500; Hard, outdoor 29 September – 5 October 2014
Japan Open; Tokyo, Japan; ATP 500; Hard, outdoor 29 September – 5 October 2014	47 / 544	1R	(Japan) Tatsuma Ito	103	Loss	5–7, 2–6
Shanghai Masters; Shanghai, China; ATP 1000; Hard, outdoor 29 September – 5 October 2014
Shanghai Masters; Shanghai, China; ATP 1000; Hard, outdoor 29 September – 5 October 2014	–	1R	Bye			
Shanghai Masters; Shanghai, China; ATP 1000; Hard, outdoor 29 September – 5 October 2014	48 / 545	2R	(France) Gilles Simon	29	Loss	7–5, 5–7, 4–6
Swiss Indoors Basel; Basel, Switzerland; ATP 500; Hard, indoor 20 – 26 October 2014
Swiss Indoors Basel; Basel, Switzerland; ATP 500; Hard, indoor 20 – 26 October 2014	49 / 546	1R	(Kazakhstan) Mikhail Kukushkin	84	Loss	4-6, 7–6^{(7–1)}, 3-6
Paris Masters; Paris, France; ATP 1000; Hard, indoor 27 October – 2 November 2014
Paris Masters; Paris, France; ATP 1000; Hard, indoor 27 October – 2 November 2014	–	1R	Bye			
Paris Masters; Paris, France; ATP 1000; Hard, indoor 27 October – 2 November 2014	50 / 547	2R	(Austria) Dominic Thiem	37	Win	6–4, 7–6^{(8–6)}
Paris Masters; Paris, France; ATP 1000; Hard, indoor 27 October – 2 November 2014	51 / 548	3R	(South Africa) Kevin Anderson (14)	18	Loss	7–6^{(7–2)}, 5–7, 6–7^{(3–7)}
World Tour Finals; London, England; ATP Finals; Hard, indoor 9 – 16 November 2014
World Tour Finals; London, England; ATP Finals; Hard, indoor 9 – 16 November 2014	52 / 549	RR	(Czech Republic) Tomáš Berdych (6)	7	Win	6–1, 6–1
World Tour Finals; London, England; ATP Finals; Hard, indoor 9 – 16 November 2014	53 / 550	RR	(Serbia) Novak Djokovic (1)	1	Loss	3–6, 0–6
World Tour Finals; London, England; ATP Finals; Hard, indoor 9 – 16 November 2014	54 / 551	RR	(Croatia) Marin Čilić (8)	8	Win	6–3, 4–6, 6–3
World Tour Finals; London, England; ATP Finals; Hard, indoor 9 – 16 November 2014	55 / 552	SF	(Switzerland) Roger Federer (2)	2	Loss	6–4, 5–7, 6–7^{(6–8)}
Davis Cup World Group; Lille, France; Davis Cup; Clay, indoor 21 – 23 November 2014
Davis Cup World Group; Lille, France; Davis Cup; Clay, indoor 21 – 23 November 2014	56 / 553	R1	(France) Jo-Wilfried Tsonga	12	Win	6–1, 3–6, 6–3, 6–2

=== Doubles matches ===
Tournament	Match	Round	Opponents (seed or key)	Ranks	Result	Score
Aircel Chennai Open; Chennai, India; ATP 250; Hard, outdoor 30 December 2013 – 5 January 2014; Partner: (France) Benoît Paire
Aircel Chennai Open; Chennai, India; ATP 250; Hard, outdoor 30 December 2013 – 5 January 2014; Partner: (France) Benoît Paire	1	1R	(India) Rohan Bopanna / (Pakistan) Aisam-ul-Haq Qureshi (1)	#13 / #15	Loss	4–6, 6–4, [9–11]
BNP Paribas Open; Indian Wells, United States; ATP 1000; Hard, outdoor 3 – 16 March 2014; Partner: (Switzerland) Roger Federer
BNP Paribas Open; Indian Wells, United States; ATP 1000; Hard, outdoor 3 – 16 March 2014; Partner: (Switzerland) Roger Federer	2	1R	(India) Rohan Bopanna / (Pakistan) Aisam-ul-Haq Qureshi (6)	#12 / #14	Win	6–2, 6–7^{(4–7)}, [10–6]
BNP Paribas Open; Indian Wells, United States; ATP 1000; Hard, outdoor 3 – 16 March 2014; Partner: (Switzerland) Roger Federer	3	2R	(Latvia) Ernests Gulbis / (Canada) Milos Raonic	#807 / #137	Win	7–6^{(7–3)}, 7–6^{(7–4)}
BNP Paribas Open; Indian Wells, United States; ATP 1000; Hard, outdoor 3 – 16 March 2014; Partner: (Switzerland) Roger Federer	4	QF	(India) Leander Paes / (Czech Republic) Radek Štěpánek (4)	#10 / #8	Win	6–3, 6–7^{(6–8)}, [10–4]
BNP Paribas Open; Indian Wells, United States; ATP 1000; Hard, outdoor 3 – 16 March 2014; Partner: (Switzerland) Roger Federer	5	SF	(Austria) Alexander Peya / (Brazil) Bruno Soares (2)	#3 / #3	Loss	4–6, 1–6
Davis Cup World Group; Geneva, Switzerland; Davis Cup; Hard, indoor 4 – 6 April 2014; Partner: (Switzerland) Roger Federer
Davis Cup World Group; Geneva, Switzerland; Davis Cup; Hard, indoor 4 – 6 April 2014; Partner: (Switzerland) Roger Federer	6	RR	(Kazakhstan) Andrey Golubev / (Kazakhstan) Aleksandr Nedovyesov	#161 / #126	Loss	4–6, 6–7^{(5–7)}, 6–4, 6–7^{(5–7)}
Queen's Club Championships; London, United Kingdom; ATP 250; Grass, outdoor 09 June – 15 June 2014; Partner: (Bulgaria) Grigor Dimitrov
Queen's Club Championships; London, United Kingdom; ATP 250; Grass, outdoor 09 June – 15 June 2014; Partner: (Bulgaria) Grigor Dimitrov	7	1R	(United Kingdom) Ken Skupski / (United Kingdom) Neal Skupski (WC)	#68 / #73	Win	6–3, 6–4
Queen's Club Championships; London, United Kingdom; ATP 250; Grass, outdoor 09 June – 15 June 2014; Partner: (Bulgaria) Grigor Dimitrov	8	2R	(Canada) Daniel Nestor / (Serbia) Nenad Zimonjić (3)	#6 / #8	Loss	6–7^{(4–7)}, 5–7
Rogers Cup; Toronto, Canada; ATP 1000; Hard, outdoor 04 – 10 August 2014; Partner: (Serbia) Novak Djokovic
Rogers Cup; Toronto, Canada; ATP 1000; Hard, outdoor 04 – 10 August 2014; Partner: (Serbia) Novak Djokovic	9	1R	(United Kingdom) Ken Skupski / (United Kingdom) Neal Skupski	#68 / #73	Win	6–3, 7–5
Rogers Cup; Toronto, Canada; ATP 1000; Hard, outdoor 04 – 10 August 2014; Partner: (Serbia) Novak Djokovic	10	2R	(Canada) Daniel Nestor / (Serbia) Nenad Zimonjić (3)	#5 / #7	Loss	4–6, 4–6
Davis Cup World Group; Geneva, Switzerland; Davis Cup; Hard, indoor 12 – 14 September 2014; Partner: (Switzerland) Marco Chiudinelli
Davis Cup World Group; Geneva, Switzerland; Davis Cup; Hard, indoor 12 – 14 September 2014; Partner: (Switzerland) Marco Chiudinelli	11	RR	(Italy) Simone Bolelli / (Italy) Fabio Fognini	#173 / #55	Loss	5–7, 6–3, 7–5, 3–6, 2–6
Paris Masters; Paris, France; ATP 1000; Hard, indoor 27 October – 2 November 2014; Partner: (India) Leander Paes
Paris Masters; Paris, France; ATP 1000; Hard, indoor 27 October – 2 November 2014; Partner: (India) Leander Paes	12	1R	(Spain) Feliciano López / (Belarus) Max Mirnyi	#50 / #37	Win	6–1, 2–6, [10–7]
Paris Masters; Paris, France; ATP 1000; Hard, indoor 27 October – 2 November 2014; Partner: (India) Leander Paes	13	2R	(Canada) Vasek Pospisil / (United States) Jack Sock (6)	#13 / #14	Win	6–1, 6–4
Paris Masters; Paris, France; ATP 1000; Hard, indoor 27 October – 2 November 2014; Partner: (India) Leander Paes	14	QF	(United States) Bob Bryan / (United States) Mike Bryan (1)	#1 / #1	Loss	3–6, 3–6
Davis Cup World Group; Lille, France; Davis Cup; Clay, indoor 21 – 23 November 2014; Partner: (Switzerland) Roger Federer
Davis Cup World Group; Lille, France; Davis Cup; Clay, indoor 21 – 23 November 2014; Partner: (Switzerland) Roger Federer	15	RR	(France) Julien Benneteau / (France) Richard Gasquet	#5 / #189	Win	6–3, 7–5, 6–4

=== Exhibition matches ===
Tournament	Match	Round	Opponent (Seed or Key)	Rank	Result	Score
Mubadala World Tennis Championship; Abu Dhabi, United Arab Emirates; Singles exhibition Hard, outdoor 26 – 28 December 2013
Mubadala World Tennis Championship; Abu Dhabi, United Arab Emirates; Singles exhibition Hard, outdoor 26 – 28 December 2013	1	QF	(Spain) David Ferrer (3)	3	Loss	5–7, 1–6
Mubadala World Tennis Championship; Abu Dhabi, United Arab Emirates; Singles exhibition Hard, outdoor 26 – 28 December 2013	2	PO	(United Kingdom) Andy Murray (4)	4	Loss	3–6, 4–6
AAMI Classic; Melbourne, Australia; Singles exhibition Hard, outdoor 8 – 11 January 2014
AAMI Classic; Melbourne, Australia; Singles exhibition Hard, outdoor 8 – 11 January 2014	3	QF	(France) Gilles Simon (5)	19	Loss	6–4, 5–7, 3–6
AAMI Classic; Melbourne, Australia; Singles exhibition Hard, outdoor 8 – 11 January 2014	–	PO	(Australia) Jordan Thompson (8)	321	Withdrew	N/A
Match for Africa 2 Zürich, Switzerland; Singles exhibition Hard, indoor 21 December 2014
Match for Africa 2 Zürich, Switzerland; Singles exhibition Hard, indoor 21 December 2014	4	F	(Switzerland) Roger Federer	2	Loss	6–7^{(4–7)}, 4–6

== Tournament Schedule ==
=== Singles schedule ===
Date	Tournament	City	Category	Surface	2013 result	2013 points	2014 points	Outcome
30.12.2013–05.01.2014	Chennai Open	Chennai	ATP World Tour 250	Hard	DNS	0	250	Winner (def. Édouard Roger-Vasselin, 7–5, 6–2)
13.01.2014–26.01.2014	Australian Open	Melbourne	Grand Slam	Hard	W	180	2000	Winner (def. Rafael Nadal, 6–3, 6–2, 3–6, 6–3)
31.01.2014–02.02.2014	Davis Cup World Group, 1R: Switzerland vs. Serbia	Novi Sad	Davis Cup	Hard (i)	First Round	40	40	Switzerland def. Serbia, 3–2; Switzerland advanced to WG QF
06.03.2014–16.03.2014	Indian Wells Masters	Indian Wells	ATP Masters 1000	Hard	4R	90	90	Fourth round (lost to Kevin Anderson,6–7^{(1–7)}, 6–4, 1–6)
19.03.2014–30.03.2014	Miami Masters	Miami	ATP Masters 1000	Hard	4R	90	90	Fourth round (lost to Alexandr Dolgopolov,4–6, 6–4, 1–6)
04.042014–06.04.2014	Davis Cup World Group, QF: Switzerland vs. Kazakhstan	Geneva	Davis Cup	Hard (i)	N/A	N/A	65	Switzerland def. Kazakhstan, 3–2; Switzerland advanced to WG SF
14.04.2014–20.04.2014	Monte-Carlo Masters	Roquebrune-Cap-Martin	ATP Masters 1000	Clay	W	180	1000	Winner (def. Roger Federer, 4–6, 7–6^{(7–5)}, 6–2)
05.05.2014–11.05.2014	Madrid Open	Madrid	ATP Masters 1000	Clay	F	600	10	Second round (lost to Dominic Thiem,6–1, 2–6, 4–6)
12.05.2014–18.05.2014	Italian Open	Rome	ATP Masters 1000	Clay	2R	10	90	Third round (lost to Tommy Haas,7–5, 2–6, 3–6)
25.05.2014–08.06.2014	French Open	Paris	Grand Slam	Clay	QF	360	10	First round (lost to Guillermo Garcia-Lopez,4–6, 7–5, 2–6, 0–6)
09.06.2014–16.06.2016	Queen's Club Championships	London	ATP World Tour 250	Grass	DNS	0	90	Semifinals (lost to Grigor Dimitrov 2–6, 4–6)
23.06.2014–06.07.2014	Wimbledon	London	Grand Slam	Grass	1R	10	360	Quarterfinals (lost to Roger Federer 6–3, 6–7^{(5–7)}, 4–6, 4–6)
04.08.2014–10.08.2014	Canadian Open	Toronto	ATP Masters 1000	Hard	2R	10	90	Third round (lost to Kevin Anderson, 6–7^{(8–10)}, 5–7)
11.08.2014–17.08.2014	Cincinnati Masters	Cincinnati	ATP Masters 1000	Hard	2R	10	180	Quarterfinals (lost to Julien Benneteau 6–1, 1–6, 2–6)
25.08.2014–08.09.2014	US Open	New York City	Grand Slam	Hard	SF	720	360	Quarterfinals (lost to Kei Nishikori 6–3, 5–7, 6–7^{(7–9)}, 7–6^{(7–5)}, 4–6)
12.09.2014–14.09.2014	Davis Cup World Group, SF: Switzerland vs. Italy	Geneva	Davis Cup	Hard (i)	N/A	N/A	70	Switzerland def. Italy, 3–2; Switzerland advanced to WG Final
29 September 2014– 5 October 2014	Japan Open	Tokyo	ATP World Tour 500	Hard	A	0	0	First round (lost to Tatsuma Ito 5–7, 2–6)
06.10.2014–12.10.2014	Shanghai Masters	Shanghai	ATP Masters 1000	Hard	QF	180	10	Second Round (lost to Gilles Simon 5–7, 7–5, 6–4)
18 October 2014– 26 October 2014	Swiss Indoors	Basel	ATP World Tour 500	Hard (i)	1R	0	0	First round (lost to Mikhail Kukushkin 4–6, 7–6^{(7–1)}, 3–6)
27.10.2014–02.10.2014	Paris Masters	Paris	ATP Masters 1000	Hard (i)	QF	180	90	Third Round (lost to Kevin Anderson 7–6^{(7–2)}, 5–7, 6–7^{(3–7)})
10.11.2014–17.11.2014	ATP World Tour Finals	London	ATP World Tour Finals	Hard (i)	SF	400	400	Semifinals (lost to Roger Federer 6–4, 5–7, 6–7^{(6–8)})
21 November 2014– 23 November 2014	Davis Cup World Group, F: France vs. Switzerland	Lille	Davis Cup	Clay (i)	N/A	N/A	75	Switzerland def. France, 3–1; Switzerland wins 2014 Davis Cup
Total year-end points						3910	5370	▲1460 difference

- Note – for the purposes of year end totals, the four Majors and eight ATP 1000 events must be counted. Then the next six best results will be added, seven if a player makes the Year End Championships. Any other results are not counted in the final

== Yearly records ==
=== Head-to-head matchups ===
Stan Wawrinka had a 39–17 match win–loss record in the 2014 season. His record against players who were part of the ATP rankings Top Ten at the time of their meetings was 8–3. The following list is ordered by number of wins:

- (Croatia) Marin Čilić 3–0
- (Germany) Benjamin Becker 2–0
- (Czech Republic) Tomáš Berdych 2–0
- (Spain) Tommy Robredo 2–0
- (France) Édouard Roger-Vasselin 2–0
- (United Kingdom) Aljaž Bedene 1–0
- (Cyprus) Marcos Baghdatis 1–0
- (Brazil) Thomaz Bellucci 1–0
- (Colombia) Alejandro Falla 1–0
- (Spain) David Ferrer 1–0
- (Italy) Fabio Fognini 1–0
- (Spain) Daniel Gimeno Traver 1–0
- (Uzbekistan) Denis Istomin 1–0
- (Croatia) Ivo Karlović 1–0
- (Serbia) Dušan Lajović 1–0
- (Spain) Feliciano López 1–0
- (Taiwan) Yen-hsun Lu 1–0
- (Australia) Marinko Matosevic 1–0
- (Spain) Rafael Nadal 1–0
- (France) Benoît Paire 1–0
- (Canada) Vasek Pospisil 1–0
- (United States) Sam Querrey 1–0
- (Canada) Milos Raonic 1–0
- (Spain) Pere Riba 1–0
- (Italy) Andreas Seppi 1–0
- (Portugal) João Sousa 1–0
- (France) Jo-Wilfried Tsonga 1–0
- (Czech Republic) Jiří Veselý 1–0
- (Serbia) Novak Djokovic 1–1
- (Kazakhstan) Andrey Golubev 1–1
- (Kazakhstan) Mikhail Kukushkin 1–1
- (Austria) Dominic Thiem 1–1
- (Switzerland) Roger Federer 1–2
- (France) Julien Benneteau 0–1
- (Bulgaria) Grigor Dimitrov 0–1
- (Ukraine) Alexandr Dolgopolov 0–1
- (Spain) Guillermo García López 0–1
- (Germany) Tommy Haas 0–1
- (Japan) Tatsuma Ito 0–1
- (Japan) Kei Nishikori 0–1
- (France) Gilles Simon 0–1
- (South Africa) Kevin Anderson 0–3

=== Finals ===
==== Singles: 3–0 ====
Category Grand Slam (1–0) ATP World Tour Finals (0–0) ATP World Tour Masters 1000 (1–0) ATP World Tour 500 (0–0) ATP World Tour 250 (1–0)	Titles by surface Hard (2–0) Clay (1–0) Grass (0–0)	Titles by conditions Outdoors (3–0) Indoors (0–0)

Outcome	No.	Date	Championship	Surface	Opponent	Score
Winner	1.	5 January 2014	Chennai Open, Chennai, India (2)	Hard	(France) Édouard Roger-Vasselin	7–5, 6–2
Winner	2.	26 January 2014	Australian Open, Melbourne, Australia	Hard	(Spain) Rafael Nadal	6–3, 6–2, 3–6, 6–3
Winner	3.	30 March 2014	Monte-Carlo Masters, Roquebrune-Cap-Martin, France	Clay	(Switzerland) Roger Federer	4–6, 7–6^{(7–5)}, 6–2

==== Team competitions: 1-0 ====
Outcome	No.	Date	Championship	Surface	Partners	Opponent in the final	Score in the final
Winner	1.	21–23 November 2014	Davis Cup, Lille, France	Clay (i)	(Switzerland) Roger Federer (Switzerland) Marco Chiudinelli (Switzerland) Michael Lammer	(France) Jo-Wilfried Tsonga (France) Gaël Monfils (France) Julien Benneteau (France) Richard Gasquet	3–1

=== Earnings ===
Event	Prize money	Year-to-date
Aircel Chennai Open	$73,540	$73,540
Australian Open	A$2,650,000	$2,456,685
Indian Wells Masters	$83,550	$2,540,235
Miami Masters	$51,730	$2,591,965
Monte-Carlo Masters	€549,000	$3,354,142
Madrid Open	€24,005	$3,387,435
Italian Open	€35,775	$3,436,651
French Open	€24,000	$3,469,349
Aegon Championships	€31,330	$3,512,080
Wimbledon Championships	£226,000	$3,896,461
Canadian Open	$45,065	$3,941,526
Cincinnati Masters	$80,165	$4,021,691
US Open	$370,250	$4,391,941
Japan Open	$8,580	$4,400,521
Shanghai Masters	$27,435	$4,427,956
Swiss Indoors	€10,180	$4,440,942
Paris Masters	€47,945	$4,501,679
ATP World Tour Finals	$465,000	$5,582,119
		$5,582,119

Figures in United States dollars (USD) unless noted.

== See also ==
- 2014 ATP World Tour
- 2014 Roger Federer tennis season
- 2014 Rafael Nadal tennis season
- 2014 Novak Djokovic tennis season
- 2014 Andy Murray tennis season
- 2014 Marin Čilić tennis season
