= 2014 Shanghai Masters =

2014 Shanghai Masters may refer to:

- 2014 Shanghai Masters (snooker)
- 2014 Shanghai Masters (tennis)
