= 2014 Marin Čilić tennis season =

- Full name: Marin Čilić
- Country: Croatia
- Calendar prize money: $4,879,359

Singles
- Season record: 54–21
- Calendar titles: 4
- Year-end ranking: No. 9
- Ranking change from previous year: ▲28

Grand Slam & significant results
- Australian Open: 2R
- French Open: 3R
- Wimbledon: QF
- US Open: W
- Other tournaments
- Tour Finals: RR

Doubles
- Season record: 7–13
- Calendar titles: 0
- Year-end ranking: No. 103
- Ranking change from previous year: ▲69

== All matches ==
This table chronicles all the matches of Marin Čilić in 2014, including walkovers (W/O) which the ATP does not count as wins. They are marked ND for non-decision or no decision.

Key
W	F	SF	QF	#R	RR	Q#	P#	DNQ	A	Z#	PO	G	S	B	NMS	NTI	P	NH

(W) winner; (F) finalist; (SF) semifinalist; (QF) quarterfinalist; (#R) rounds 4, 3, 2, 1; (RR) round-robin stage; (Q#) qualification round; (P#) preliminary round; (DNQ) did not qualify; (A) absent; (Z#) Davis/Fed Cup Zonal Group (with number indication) or (PO) play-off; (G) gold, (S) silver or (B) bronze Olympic/Paralympic medal; (NMS) not a Masters tournament; (NTI) not a Tier I tournament; (P) postponed; (NH) not held; (SR) strike rate (events won / competed); (W–L) win–loss record.
To avoid confusion and double counting, these charts are updated at the conclusion of a tournament or when the player's participation has ended.

=== Singles matches ===
Tournament	Match	Round	Opponent (seed or key)	Rank	Result	Score
Brisbane International; Brisbane, Australia; ATP 250; Hard, outdoor 29 December 2013 – 5 January 2014
Brisbane International; Brisbane, Australia; ATP 250; Hard, outdoor 29 December 2013 – 5 January 2014	1	1R	(Uzbekistan) Denis Istomin	45	Win	6–7^{(3–7)}, 7–6^{(7–5)}, 6–4
Brisbane International; Brisbane, Australia; ATP 250; Hard, outdoor 29 December 2013 – 5 January 2014	2	2R	(Bulgaria) Grigor Dimitrov	23	Win	7–5, 7–5
Brisbane International; Brisbane, Australia; ATP 250; Hard, outdoor 29 December 2013 – 5 January 2014	3	QF	(Japan) Kei Nishikori (2)	17	Loss	4–6, 7–5, 2–6
Apia International Sydney; Sydney, Australia; ATP 250; Hard, outdoor 5–11 January 2014
Apia International Sydney; Sydney, Australia; ATP 250; Hard, outdoor 5–11 January 2014	4	1R	(Germany) Jan-Lennard Struff (Q)	106	Win	3–6, 6–3, 6–3
Apia International Sydney; Sydney, Australia; ATP 250; Hard, outdoor 5–11 January 2014	5	2R	(Uzbekistan) Denis Istomin	49	Loss	3–6, 4–6
Australian Open; Melbourne, Australia; Grand Slam tournament Hard, outdoor 13 – 26 January 2014
Australian Open; Melbourne, Australia; Grand Slam tournament Hard, outdoor 13 – 26 January 2014	6	1R	(Spain) Marcel Granollers	35	Win	4–6, 4–6, 6–6, 6–3, 6–2
Australian Open; Melbourne, Australia; Grand Slam tournament Hard, outdoor 13 – 26 January 2014	7	2R	(France) Gilles Simon (18)	19	Loss	6–4, 6–7^{(3–7)}, 7–6^{(7–5)}, 1–6, 2–6
PBZ Zagreb Indoors; Zagreb, Croatia; ATP 250; Hard, indoor 3 – 9 February 2014
PBZ Zagreb Indoors; Zagreb, Croatia; ATP 250; Hard, indoor 3 – 9 February 2014	8	1R	(Croatia) Mate Delić (WC)	370	Win	6–4, 6–4
PBZ Zagreb Indoors; Zagreb, Croatia; ATP 250; Hard, indoor 3 – 9 February 2014	9	2R	(Serbia) Dušan Lajović	101	Win	6–4, 7–5
PBZ Zagreb Indoors; Zagreb, Croatia; ATP 250; Hard, indoor 3 – 9 February 2014	10	QF	(Croatia) Ivan Dodig (4)	34	Win	7–5, 6–4
PBZ Zagreb Indoors; Zagreb, Croatia; ATP 250; Hard, indoor 3 – 9 February 2014	11	SF	(Germany) Björn Phau (Q)	358	Win	6–3, 6–4
PBZ Zagreb Indoors; Zagreb, Croatia; ATP 250; Hard, indoor 3 – 9 February 2014	12	W	(Germany) Tommy Haas (1)	12	Win (1)	6–3, 6–4
Rotterdam Open; Rotterdam, Netherlands; ATP 500; Hard, indoor 10 – 16 February 2014
Rotterdam Open; Rotterdam, Netherlands; ATP 500; Hard, indoor 10 – 16 February 2014	13	1R	(Czech Republic) Lukáš Rosol)	50	Win	6–2, 6–2
Rotterdam Open; Rotterdam, Netherlands; ATP 500; Hard, indoor 10 – 16 February 2014	14	2R	(France) Jo-Wilfried Tsonga (5)	10	Win	6–4, 6–4
Rotterdam Open; Rotterdam, Netherlands; ATP 500; Hard, indoor 10 – 16 February 2014	15	QF	(United Kingdom) Andy Murray (2/WC)	6	Win	6–3, 6–4
Rotterdam Open; Rotterdam, Netherlands; ATP 500; Hard, indoor 10 – 16 February 2014	16	SF	(Netherlands) Igor Sijsling (WC)	64	Win	5–7, 6–3, 6–2
Rotterdam Open; Rotterdam, Netherlands; ATP 500; Hard, indoor 10 – 16 February 2014	17	F	(Czech Republic) Tomáš Berdych (3)	7	Loss (1)	4–6, 2–6
Delray Beach Open; Delray Beach, United States; ATP 250; Hard, outdoor 17 – 23 February 2014
Delray Beach Open; Delray Beach, United States; ATP 250; Hard, outdoor 17 – 23 February 2014	18	1R	(Germany) Benjamin Becker	93	Win	6–1, 6–3
Delray Beach Open; Delray Beach, United States; ATP 250; Hard, outdoor 17 – 23 February 2014	19	2R	(United States) Ryan Harrison (WC)	115	Win	6–3, 6–4
Delray Beach Open; Delray Beach, United States; ATP 250; Hard, outdoor 17 – 23 February 2014	20	QF	(Russia) Teymuraz Gabashvili	65	Win	6–2, 6–3
Delray Beach Open; Delray Beach, United States; ATP 250; Hard, outdoor 17 – 23 February 2014	21	SF	(United States) John Isner (2)	13	Win	7–6^{(7–5)}, 6–3
Delray Beach Open; Delray Beach, United States; ATP 250; Hard, outdoor 17 – 23 February 2014	22	W	(South Africa) Kevin Anderson (4)	21	Win (2)	7–6^{(8–6)}, 6–7^{(7–9)}, 6–4
BNP Paribas Open; Indian Wells, United States; ATP 1000; Hard, outdoor 3 – 16 March 2014
BNP Paribas Open; Indian Wells, United States; ATP 1000; Hard, outdoor 3 – 16 March 2014	–	1R	Bye			
BNP Paribas Open; Indian Wells, United States; ATP 1000; Hard, outdoor 3 – 16 March 2014	23	2R	(Italy) Paolo Lorenzi (Q)	100	Win	6–2, 6–2
BNP Paribas Open; Indian Wells, United States; ATP 1000; Hard, outdoor 3 – 16 March 2014	24	3R	(Spain) Tommy Robredo (16)	17	Win	6–4, 6–3
BNP Paribas Open; Indian Wells, United States; ATP 1000; Hard, outdoor 3 – 16 March 2014	25	4R	(Serbia) Novak Djokovic (2)	2	Loss	6–1, 2–6, 3–6
Sony Open Tennis; Miami, United States; ATP 1000; Hard, outdoor 17 – 30 March 2014
Sony Open Tennis; Miami, United States; ATP 1000; Hard, outdoor 17 – 30 March 2014	–	1R	Bye			
Sony Open Tennis; Miami, United States; ATP 1000; Hard, outdoor 17 – 30 March 2014	26	2R	(France) Édouard Roger-Vasselin	43	Loss	2–6, 6–7^{(5–7)}
Davis Cup Zone Group I Warsaw, Poland; Davis Cup; Hard, indoor 4 – 6 April 2014
Davis Cup Zone Group I Warsaw, Poland; Davis Cup; Hard, indoor 4 – 6 April 2014	27	2R	(Poland) Michał Przysiężny	73	Win	6–1, 6–4, 6–4
Davis Cup Zone Group I Warsaw, Poland; Davis Cup; Hard, indoor 4 – 6 April 2014	28	2R	(Poland) Jerzy Janowicz	21	Win	3–6, 6–7^{(5–7)}, 6–4, 6–1, 6–3
Monte-Carlo Rolex Masters; Roquebrune-Cap-Martin, France; ATP 1000; Clay, outdoor 12 – 20 April 2014
Monte-Carlo Rolex Masters; Roquebrune-Cap-Martin, France; ATP 1000; Clay, outdoor 12 – 20 April 2014	29	1R	(Australia) Marinko Matosevic (LL)	66	Win	6–1, 3–6, 6–2
Monte-Carlo Rolex Masters; Roquebrune-Cap-Martin, France; ATP 1000; Clay, outdoor 12 – 20 April 2014	30	2R	(Switzerland) Stan Wawrinka (3)	3	Loss	0–6, 6–2
Barcelona Open; Barcelona, Spain; ATP 500; Clay, outdoor 21 – 21 April 2014
Barcelona Open; Barcelona, Spain; ATP 500; Clay, outdoor 21 – 21 April 2014	–	1R	Bye			
Barcelona Open; Barcelona, Spain; ATP 500; Clay, outdoor 21 – 21 April 2014	31	2R	(Russia) Andrey Kuznetsov (Q)	131	Win	6–1, 7–6^{(7–2)}
Barcelona Open; Barcelona, Spain; ATP 500; Clay, outdoor 21 – 21 April 2014	32	3R	(Spain) Tommy Robredo (5)	18	Win	7–5, 6–7^{(3–7)}, 7–6^{(7–5)}
Barcelona Open; Barcelona, Spain; ATP 500; Clay, outdoor 21 – 21 April 2014	33	QF	(Japan) Kei Nishikori (4)	17	Loss	1–6, 3–6
Mutua Madrid Open; Madrid, Spain; ATP 1000; Clay, outdoor 3 – 11 May 2014
Mutua Madrid Open; Madrid, Spain; ATP 1000; Clay, outdoor 3 – 11 May 2014	34	1R	(Portugal) João Sousa	40	Win	6–1, 6–1
Mutua Madrid Open; Madrid, Spain; ATP 1000; Clay, outdoor 3 – 11 May 2014	35	2R	(France) Paul-Henri Mathieu (Q)	87	Win	6–4, 1–6, 6–2
Mutua Madrid Open; Madrid, Spain; ATP 1000; Clay, outdoor 3 – 11 May 2014	36	3R	(Latvia) Ernests Gulbis	20	Loss	3–6, 4–6
Internazionali BNL d'Italia; Rome, Italy; ATP 1000; Clay, outdoor 11 – 18 May 2014
Internazionali BNL d'Italia; Rome, Italy; ATP 1000; Clay, outdoor 11 – 18 May 2014	37	1R	(Colombia) Santiago Giraldo (Q)	36	Win	6–4, 2–0, Ret
Internazionali BNL d'Italia; Rome, Italy; ATP 1000; Clay, outdoor 11 – 18 May 2014	38	2R	(Austria) Jürgen Melzer (PR)	67	Loss	2–6, 7–6^{(7–5)}, 3–6
French Open; Paris, France; Grand Slam tournament Clay, outdoor 25 May – 8 June 2014
French Open; Paris, France; Grand Slam tournament Clay, outdoor 25 May – 8 June 2014	39	1R	(Spain) Pablo Andújar	78	Win	6–0, 6–3, 7–6^{(8–6)}
French Open; Paris, France; Grand Slam tournament Clay, outdoor 25 May – 8 June 2014	40	2R	(Germany) Tobias Kamke	106	Win	6–3, 3–6, 6–3, 6–0
French Open; Paris, France; Grand Slam tournament Clay, outdoor 25 May – 8 June 2014	41	3R	(Serbia) Novak Djokovic (2)	2	Loss	3–6, 2–6, 7–6^{(7–2)}, 4–6
Queen's Club Championships; London, United Kingdom; ATP 250; Grass, outdoor 9–15 June 2014
Queen's Club Championships; London, United Kingdom; ATP 250; Grass, outdoor 9–15 June 2014	42	1R	(Australia) Marinko Matosevic	60	Loss	4–6, 4–6
Wimbledon Championships; London, United Kingdom; Grand Slam tournament Grass, outdoor 23 June – 7 July 2014
Wimbledon Championships; London, United Kingdom; Grand Slam tournament Grass, outdoor 23 June – 7 July 2014	43	1R	(France) Paul-Henri Mathieu	89	Win	6–4, 6–7^{(2–7)}, 6–2, 6–1
Wimbledon Championships; London, United Kingdom; Grand Slam tournament Grass, outdoor 23 June – 7 July 2014	44	2R	(Austria) Andreas Haider-Maurer	95	Win	3–6, 6–1, 6–4, 6–4
Wimbledon Championships; London, United Kingdom; Grand Slam tournament Grass, outdoor 23 June – 7 July 2014	45	3R	(Czech Republic) Tomáš Berdych (6)	6	Win	7–6^{(7–5)}, 6–4, 7–6^{(8–6)}
Wimbledon Championships; London, United Kingdom; Grand Slam tournament Grass, outdoor 23 June – 7 July 2014	46	4R	(France) Jérémy Chardy	42	Win	7–6^{(10–8)}, 6–4, 6–4
Wimbledon Championships; London, United Kingdom; Grand Slam tournament Grass, outdoor 23 June – 7 July 2014	47	QF	(Serbia) Novak Djokovic (1)	2	Loss	1–6, 6–3, 7–6^{(7–4)}, 2–6, 2–6
Croatia Open; Umag, Croatia; ATP 250; Clay, outdoor 21 – 27 July 2014
Croatia Open; Umag, Croatia; ATP 250; Clay, outdoor 21 – 27 July 2014	–	1R	Bye			
Croatia Open; Umag, Croatia; ATP 250; Clay, outdoor 21 – 27 July 2014	48	2R	(Netherlands) Igor Sijsling	76	Win	7–5, 6–3
Croatia Open; Umag, Croatia; ATP 250; Clay, outdoor 21 – 27 July 2014	49	QF	(Czech Republic) Lukáš Rosol (5)	43	Win	6–0, 6–2
Croatia Open; Umag, Croatia; ATP 250; Clay, outdoor 21 – 27 July 2014	50	SF	(Spain) Tommy Robredo (3)	18	Loss	6–7^{(10–12)}, 3–6
Rogers Cup; Toronto, Canada; ATP 1000; Hard, outdoor 2 – 10 August 2014
Rogers Cup; Toronto, Canada; ATP 1000; Hard, outdoor 2 – 10 August 2014	51	1R	(Uzbekistan) Denis Istomin	39	Win	6–2, 4–6, 7–5
Rogers Cup; Toronto, Canada; ATP 1000; Hard, outdoor 2 – 10 August 2014	52	2R	(Tunisia) Malek Jaziri (LL)	103	Win	4–6, 6–0, 7–6^{(7–4)}
Rogers Cup; Toronto, Canada; ATP 1000; Hard, outdoor 2 – 10 August 2014	53	3R	(Switzerland) Roger Federer (2)	3	Loss	6–7^{(5–7)}, 7–6^{(7–3)}, 4–6
Cincinnati Masters; Cincinnati, United States; ATP 1000; Hard, outdoor 11 – 17 August 2014
Cincinnati Masters; Cincinnati, United States; ATP 1000; Hard, outdoor 11 – 17 August 2014	54	1R	(Spain) Feliciano López	16	Win	6–3, 6–4
Cincinnati Masters; Cincinnati, United States; ATP 1000; Hard, outdoor 11 – 17 August 2014	55	2R	(Spain) Fernando Verdasco	34	Win	7–6^{(8–6)}, 7–6^{(7–5)}
Cincinnati Masters; Cincinnati, United States; ATP 1000; Hard, outdoor 11 – 17 August 2014	56	3R	(Switzerland) Stan Wawrinka (3)	4	Loss	6–3, 0–6, 1–6
US Open; New York, United States; Grand Slam tournament Hard, outdoor 25 July – 8 September 2014
US Open; New York, United States; Grand Slam tournament Hard, outdoor 25 July – 8 September 2014	57	1R	(Cyprus) Marcos Baghdatis	86	Win	6–3, 3–1, Ret
US Open; New York, United States; Grand Slam tournament Hard, outdoor 25 July – 8 September 2014	58	2R	(Ukraine) Illya Marchenko (Q)	163	Win	7–6^{(7–2)}, 6–2, 6–4
US Open; New York, United States; Grand Slam tournament Hard, outdoor 25 July – 8 September 2014	59	3R	(South Africa) Kevin Anderson (18)	20	Win	6–3, 3–6, 6–3, 6–4
US Open; New York, United States; Grand Slam tournament Hard, outdoor 25 July – 8 September 2014	60	4R	(France) Gilles Simon (26)	31	Win	5–7, 7–6^{(7–3)}, 6–4, 3–6, 6–3
US Open; New York, United States; Grand Slam tournament Hard, outdoor 25 July – 8 September 2014	61	QF	(Czech Republic) Tomáš Berdych (6)	7	Win	6–2, 6–4, 7–6^{(7–4)}
US Open; New York, United States; Grand Slam tournament Hard, outdoor 25 July – 8 September 2014	62	SF	(Switzerland) Roger Federer (2)	3	Win	6–3, 6–4, 6–4
US Open; New York, United States; Grand Slam tournament Hard, outdoor 25 July – 8 September 2014	63	W	(Japan) Kei Nishikori (10)	11	Win (3)	6–3, 6–3, 6–3
Davis Cup World Group play-offs Amsterdam, Netherlands; Davis Cup; Clay, outdoor 12 – 14 September 2014
Davis Cup World Group play-offs Amsterdam, Netherlands; Davis Cup; Clay, outdoor 12 – 14 September 2014	64	R2	(Netherlands) Thiemo de Bakker	145	Win	6–7^{(4–7)}, 6–4, 6–2, 7–5
China Open; Beijing, China; ATP 500; Hard, outdoor 27 September – 5 October 2014
China Open; Beijing, China; ATP 500; Hard, outdoor 27 September – 5 October 2014	65	1R	(China) Bai Yan (WC)	464	Win	6–3, 6–4
China Open; Beijing, China; ATP 500; Hard, outdoor 27 September – 5 October 2014	66	2R	(Portugal) João Sousa	52	Win	6–3, 6–3
China Open; Beijing, China; ATP 500; Hard, outdoor 27 September – 5 October 2014	67	3R	(United Kingdom) Andy Murray (6/WC)	11	Loss	1–6, 4–6
Shanghai Masters; Shanghai, China; ATP 1000; Hard, outdoor 5 – 12 October 2014
Shanghai Masters; Shanghai, China; ATP 1000; Hard, outdoor 5 – 12 October 2014	68	1R	(Croatia) Ivo Karlović	31	Loss	5–7, 6–2, 6–7^{(2–7)}
Kremlin Cup; Moscow, Russia; ATP 250; Hard, indoor 13 – 19 October 2014
Kremlin Cup; Moscow, Russia; ATP 250; Hard, indoor 13 – 19 October 2014	–	1R	Bye			
Kremlin Cup; Moscow, Russia; ATP 250; Hard, indoor 13 – 19 October 2014	69	2R	(Russia) Evgeny Donskoy (WC)	128	Win	6–3, 3–6, 6–3
Kremlin Cup; Moscow, Russia; ATP 250; Hard, indoor 13 – 19 October 2014	70	QF	(Spain) Tommy Robredo (6)	21	Win	6–3, 6–3
Kremlin Cup; Moscow, Russia; ATP 250; Hard, indoor 13 – 19 October 2014	71	SF	(Kazakhstan) Mikhail Kukushkin	74	Win	4–6, 6–3, 6–2
Kremlin Cup; Moscow, Russia; ATP 250; Hard, indoor 13 – 19 October 2014	72	W	(Spain) Roberto Bautista Agut (5)	16	Win (4)	6–4, 6–4
World Tour Finals; London, England; ATP Finals; Hard, indoor 9 – 16 November 2014
World Tour Finals; London, England; ATP Finals; Hard, indoor 9 – 16 November 2014	73	RR	(Serbia) Novak Djokovic (1)	1	Loss	1–6, 1–6
World Tour Finals; London, England; ATP Finals; Hard, indoor 9 – 16 November 2014	74	RR	(Czech Republic) Tomáš Berdych (6)	7	Loss	3–6, 1–6
World Tour Finals; London, England; ATP Finals; Hard, indoor 9 – 16 November 2014	75	RR	(Switzerland) Stan Wawrinka (3)	4	Loss	3–6, 6–4, 3–6

== Yearly records ==
=== Head-to-head matchups ===
Stan Wawrinka had a 54–21 match win–loss record in the 2014 season. His record against players who were part of the ATP rankings Top Ten at the time of their meetings was 6–3. The following list is ordered by number of wins:

- (Spain) Tommy Robredo 3–1
- (South Africa) Kevin Anderson 2–0
- (France) Paul-Henri Mathieu 2–0
- (Czech Republic) Lukáš Rosol 2–0
- (Netherlands) Igor Sijsling 2–0
- (Portugal) João Sousa 2–0
- (Uzbekistan) Denis Istomin 2–1
- (Czech Republic) Tomáš Berdych 2–2
- (Spain) Pablo Andújar 1–0
- (Cyprus) Marcos Baghdatis 1–0
- (Spain) Roberto Bautista Agut 1–0
- (Germany) Benjamin Becker 1–0
- (France) Jérémy Chardy 1–0
- (Netherlands) Thiemo de Bakker 1–0
- (Croatia) Mate Delić 1–0
- (Bulgaria) Grigor Dimitrov 1–0
- (Croatia) Ivan Dodig 1–0
- (Russia) Evgeny Donskoy 1–0
- (Russia) Teymuraz Gabashvili 1–0
- (Colombia) Santiago Giraldo 1–0
- (Spain) Marcel Granollers 1–0
- (Germany) Tommy Haas 1–0
- (Austria) Andreas Haider-Maurer 1–0
- (United States) Ryan Harrison 1–0
- (United States) John Isner 1–0
- (Poland) Jerzy Janowicz 1–0
- (Tunisia) Malek Jaziri 1–0
- (Germany) Tobias Kamke 1–0
- (Croatia) Ivo Karlović 1–0
- (Kazakhstan) Mikhail Kukushkin 1–0
- (Russia) Andrey Kuznetsov 1–0
- (Serbia) Dušan Lajović 1–0
- (Spain) Feliciano López 1–0
- (Italy) Paolo Lorenzi 1–0
- (Ukraine) Illya Marchenko 1–0
- (Germany) Björn Phau 1–0
- (Poland) Michał Przysiężny 1–0
- (Germany) Jan-Lennard Struff 1–0
- (France) Jo-Wilfried Tsonga 1–0
- (Spain) Fernando Verdasco 1–0
- (China) Bai Yan 1–0
- (Switzerland) Roger Federer 1–1
- (Australia) Marinko Matosevic 1–1
- (United Kingdom) Andy Murray 1–1
- (France) Gilles Simon 1–1
- (Japan) Kei Nishikori 1–2
- (Latvia) Ernests Gulbis 0–1
- (Austria) Jürgen Melzer 0–1
- (France) Édouard Roger-Vasselin 0–1
- (Switzerland) Stan Wawrinka 0–3
- (Serbia) Novak Djokovic 0–4

=== Finals ===
==== Singles: 4 (3–1) ====
Category Grand Slam (1–0) ATP World Tour Finals (0–0) ATP World Tour Masters 1000 (0–0) ATP World Tour 500 (0–0) ATP World Tour 250 (3–1)	Titles by surface Hard (4–1) Clay (0–0) Grass (0–0)	Titles by conditions Outdoors (2–0) Indoors (2–1)

Outcome	No.	Date	Championship	Surface	Opponent in the final	Score in the final
Winner	10.	February 9, 2014	PBZ Zagreb Indoors, Zagreb, Croatia (4)	Hard (i)	(Germany) Tommy Haas	6–3, 6–4
Runner-up	9.	February 16, 2014	Rotterdam Open, Rotterdam, Netherlands	Hard (i)	(Czech Republic) Tomáš Berdych	4–6, 2–6
Winner	11.	February 23, 2014	Delray Beach Open, Delray Beach, USA	Hard	(South Africa) Kevin Anderson	7–6^{(8–6)}, 6–7^{(7–9)}, 6–4
Winner	12.	September 8, 2014	US Open, New York, United States	Hard	(Japan) Kei Nishikori	6–3, 6–3, 6–3
Winner	13.	October 19, 2014	Kremlin Cup, Moscow, Russia	Hard (i)	(Spain) Roberto Bautista Agut	6–4, 6–4

== See also ==
- 2014 ATP World Tour
- 2014 Roger Federer tennis season
- 2014 Rafael Nadal tennis season
- 2014 Novak Djokovic tennis season
- 2014 Andy Murray tennis season
- 2014 Stanislas Wawrinka tennis season
