= 2014 Erste Bank Open – Doubles =

Doubles
- 2014 Erste Bank Open

Final
- Champions: (Austria) Jürgen Melzer (Germany) Philipp Petzschner
- Runners-up: (Germany) Andre Begemann (Austria) Julian Knowle
- Score: 7–6^{(8–6)}, 4–6, [10–7]

Details
- Draw: 16
- Seeds: 4

Events
Singles	Doubles
← 2013 ·	Vienna Open	· 2015 →

Florin Mergea and Lukáš Rosol were the defending champions, but chose not to participate together. Mergea played alongside Marin Draganja, but lost in the semifinals to Andre Begemann and Julian Knowle. Rosol teamed up with Santiago González, but lost in the semifinals to Jürgen Melzer and Philipp Petzschner.

Melzer and Petzschner went on to win the title, defeating Begemann and Knowle in the final, 7–6^{(8–6)}, 4–6, [10–7].

== Seeds ==
1. (Austria) Alexander Peya / (Brazil) Bruno Soares (first round)
2. (Poland) Mariusz Fyrstenberg / (Spain) David Marrero (quarterfinals)
3. (Croatia) Marin Draganja / (Romania) Florin Mergea (semifinals)
4. (Mexico) Santiago González / (Czech Republic) Lukáš Rosol (semifinals)

== Draw ==
=== Key ===
- Q = Qualifier
- WC = Wild card
- LL = Lucky loser
- Alt = Alternate
- SE = Special exempt
- PR = Protected ranking
- ITF = ITF entry
- JE = Junior exempt
- w/o = Walkover
- r = Retired
- d = Defaulted
- SR = Special ranking

=== Draw ===
First round
1	(Austria) A Peya (Brazil) B Soares	5	2
WC	(Austria) J Melzer (Germany) P Petzschner	7	6
(Germany) B Becker (Germany) J-L Struff	7^{7}	4	[8]
(Croatia) M Pavić (Brazil) A Sá	6^{4}	6	[10]
4	(Mexico) S González (Czech Republic) L Rosol	6	6
(Germany) T Kamke (Germany) P Marx	1	2
(Colombia) N Barrientos (Dominican Republic) V Estrella Burgos	6^{2}	6^{2}
(Spain) G García-López (Austria) P Oswald	7^{7}	7^{7}
WC	(Austria) D Thiem (Germany) A Zverev	5	6	[9]
(Germany) C Kas (Germany) P Kohlschreiber	7	3	[11]
Alt	(Argentina) F Delbonis (Ukraine) S Stakhovsky	6	3	[8]
3	(Croatia) M Draganja (Romania) F Mergea	4	6	[10]
(Germany) A Begemann (Austria) J Knowle	6	6
(United States) S Lipsky (Austria) O Marach	3	4
(Netherlands) J Huta Galung (New Zealand) M Venus	4	4
2	(Poland) M Fyrstenberg (Spain) D Marrero	6	6

Quarterfinals
WC	(Austria) J Melzer (Germany) P Petzschner	6	6
(Croatia) M Pavić (Brazil) A Sá	4	2
4	(Mexico) S González (Czech Republic) L Rosol	7^{7}	6
(Spain) G García-López (Austria) P Oswald	6^{4}	4
(Germany) C Kas (Germany) P Kohlschreiber	6	2	[8]
3	(Croatia) M Draganja (Romania) F Mergea	3	6	[10]
(Germany) A Begemann (Austria) J Knowle	6	7
2	(Poland) M Fyrstenberg (Spain) D Marrero	2	5

Semifinals
WC	(Austria) J Melzer (Germany) P Petzschner	6	7
4	(Mexico) S González (Czech Republic) L Rosol	2	5
3	(Croatia) M Draganja (Romania) F Mergea	6	6^{5}	[9]
(Germany) A Begemann (Austria) J Knowle	1	7^{7}	[11]

Final
WC	(Austria) J Melzer (Germany) P Petzschner	7^{8}	4	[10]
(Germany) A Begemann (Austria) J Knowle	6^{6}	6	[7]
