= 2014 Erste Bank Open – Singles =

Singles
- 2014 Erste Bank Open

Final
- Champion: (United Kingdom) Andy Murray
- Runner-up: (Spain) David Ferrer
- Score: 5–7, 6–2, 7–5

Details
- Draw: 28
- Seeds: 8

Events
Singles	Doubles
- Vienna Open

Tommy Haas was the defending champion, but could not participate this year due to a shoulder injury.

Andy Murray won the title by defeating David Ferrer 5–7, 6–2, 7–5 in the final. This was Ferrer's tenth defeat in his last eleven ATP World Tour's finals.

== Seeds ==
The top four seeds receive a bye into the second round.

1. (Spain) David Ferrer (final)
2. (United Kingdom) Andy Murray (champion)
3. (Spain) Feliciano López (second round)
4. (Germany) Philipp Kohlschreiber (semifinals)
5. (Czech Republic) Lukáš Rosol (second round)
6. (Croatia) Ivo Karlović (quarterfinals)
7. (Spain) Guillermo García López (first round)
8. (Austria) Dominic Thiem (first round)

== Draw ==
Key

- Q = Qualifier
- WC = Wild card
- LL = Lucky loser
- Alt = Alternate
- ITF = ITF entry
- PR = Protected ranking
- SR = Special ranking
- SE = Special exempt
- JE = Junior exempt
- JR = Junior Accelerator Programme entrant
- CO = College Accelerator Programme entrant
- NG = Next Gen Accelerator Program entrant
- w/o = Walkover
- r = Retired
- d = Defaulted

=== Finals ===
Semifinals
1/WC	(Spain) David Ferrer	6	2	7^{7}
4	(Germany) Philipp Kohlschreiber	3	6	6^{3}
Q	(Serbia) Viktor Troicki	4	3
2/WC	(United Kingdom) Andy Murray	6	6

Final
1/WC	(Spain) David Ferrer	7	2	5
2/WC	(United Kingdom) Andy Murray	5	6	7

=== Top half ===
First round
(Germany) T Kamke	3	6	6
(Italy) S Bolelli	6	3	4
PR	(Austria) J Melzer	3	6	6
LL	(Slovakia) N Gomboš	6	4	3
(Argentina) F Delbonis	7^{7}	6^{9}	6^{2}
6	(Croatia) I Karlović	6^{1}	7^{11}	7^{7}
WC	(Austria) G Melzer	3	6^{2}
(Argentina) C Berlocq	6	7^{7}
Q	(Romania) V Hănescu	6	1	3
(Germany) B Becker	4	6	6
(Netherlands) R Haase	6	3	6
8	(Austria) D Thiem	3	6	3

Second round
1/WC	(Spain) D Ferrer	7	6
(Germany) T Kamke	5	1
PR	(Austria) J Melzer	4	6^{1}
6	(Croatia) I Karlović	6	7^{7}
4	(Germany) P Kohlschreiber	3	6	6
(Argentina) C Berlocq	6	1	4
(Germany) B Becker	6	6
(Netherlands) R Haase	3	3

Quarterfinals
1/WC	(Spain) D Ferrer	7^{7}	6
6	(Croatia) I Karlović	6^{5}	4
4	(Germany) P Kohlschreiber	6	7^{7}
(Germany) B Becker	4	6^{3}

Semifinals
1/WC	(Spain) D Ferrer	6	2	7^{7}
4	(Germany) P Kohlschreiber	3	6	6^{3}

=== Bottom half ===
First round
5	(Czech Republic) L Rosol	6	6
(Slovakia) L Lacko	2	4
(Dominican Republic) V Estrella Burgos	0	3
Q	(Serbia) V Troicki	6	6
(France) P-H Mathieu	1	4
(Brazil) T Bellucci	6	6
7	(Spain) G García López	3	4
(Germany) J-L Struff	6	6
(Ukraine) S Stakhovsky	6	4	6
Q	(Slovakia) M Mečíř Jr.	2	6	3
(Canada) V Pospisil	6	6^{3}	7^{7}
Q	(Germany) D Brands	3	7^{7}	6^{2}

Second round
5	(Czech Republic) L Rosol	3	2
Q	(Serbia) V Troicki	6	6
(Brazil) T Bellucci	6^{9}	6	6
3	(Spain) F López	7^{11}	1	4
(Germany) J-L Struff	7^{8}	2	7^{7}
(Ukraine) S Stakhovsky	6^{6}	6	6^{3}
(Canada) V Pospisil	4	4
2/WC	(United Kingdom) A Murray	6	6

Quarterfinals
Q	(Serbia) V Troicki	7^{7}	6^{2}	6
(Brazil) T Bellucci	6^{4}	7^{7}	2
(Germany) J-L Struff	2	5
2/WC	(United Kingdom) A Murray	6	7

Semifinals
Q	(Serbia) V Troicki	4	3
2/WC	(United Kingdom) A Murray	6	6

== Qualifying ==
=== Seeds ===
1. (Germany) Peter Gojowczyk (second round)
2. (Germany) Michael Berrer (second round)
3. (United Kingdom) James Ward (second round)
4. (Portugal) Gastão Elias (first round)
5. (Romania) Victor Hănescu (qualified)
6. (Serbia) Viktor Troicki (qualified)
7. (Hungary) Márton Fucsovics (second round)
8. (Croatia) Borna Ćorić (first round)

=== Qualifiers ===
1. (Serbia) Viktor Troicki
2. (Romania) Victor Hănescu
3. (Slovakia) Miloslav Mečíř Jr.
4. (Germany) Daniel Brands

=== Lucky loser ===
1. (Slovakia) Norbert Gomboš

=== Qualifying draw ===
==== First qualifier ====
First round
1	(Germany) Peter Gojowczyk	3	6	6
(Austria) Martin Fischer	6	1	4
(Belgium) Ruben Bemelmans	6	7
WC	(Austria) Dennis Novak	2	5
WC	(Germany) Philipp Petzschner	7	6
(Slovakia) Jozef Kovalík	5	4
WC	(Germany) Robin Kern	2	3
6	(Serbia) Viktor Troicki	6	6

Second round
1	(Germany) Peter Gojowczyk	6^{3}	7^{7}	3
(Belgium) Ruben Bemelmans	7^{7}	6^{5}	6
WC	(Germany) Philipp Petzschner	6	3	3
6	(Serbia) Viktor Troicki	2	6	6

Qualifying competition
(Belgium) Ruben Bemelmans	5	6	6^{3}
6	(Serbia) Viktor Troicki	7	2	7^{7}

==== Second qualifier ====
First round
2	(Germany) Michael Berrer	7^{7}	3	6
(France) Tristan Lamasine	6^{2}	6	3
(Italy) Matteo Viola	3	2
(Japan) Taro Daniel	6	6
(Italy) Marco Cecchinato	2	4
(Serbia) Ilija Bozoljac	6	6
(Belarus) Uladzimir Ignatik	3	2
5	(Romania) Victor Hănescu	6	6

Second round
2	(Germany) Michael Berrer	7^{7}	2	4
(Japan) Taro Daniel	6^{5}	6	6
(Serbia) Ilija Bozoljac	3	5
5	(Romania) Victor Hănescu	6	7

Qualifying competition
(Japan) Taro Daniel	2	3
5	(Romania) Victor Hănescu	6	6

==== Third qualifier ====
First round
3	(United Kingdom) James Ward	5	6	6
(Croatia) Antonio Veić	7	4	3
(Croatia) Mate Delić	6	2	3
(Slovakia) Norbert Gomboš	4	6	6
(Slovakia) Miloslav Mečíř Jr.	3	7	6
(Poland) Michał Przysiężny	6	5	3
(Japan) Yoshihito Nishioka	6	6
8	(Croatia) Borna Ćorić	4	2

Second round
3	(United Kingdom) James Ward	6^{6}	3
(Slovakia) Norbert Gomboš	7^{8}	6
(Slovakia) Miloslav Mečíř Jr.	6	6
(Japan) Yoshihito Nishioka	2	4

Qualifying competition
(Slovakia) Norbert Gomboš	6^{2}	4
(Slovakia) Miloslav Mečíř Jr.	7^{7}	6

==== Fourth qualifier ====
First round
4	(Portugal) Gastão Elias	4	6	6^{6}
(Netherlands) Jesse Huta Galung	6	4	7^{8}
(Germany) Alexander Zverev	6^{6}	6	7
WC	(Austria) Bastian Trinker	7^{8}	4	5
(Germany) Daniel Brands	6	7^{7}
(Spain) Marc Giner	3	6^{3}
(Switzerland) Marco Chiudinelli	6^{4}	6^{7}
7	(Hungary) Márton Fucsovics	7^{7}	7^{9}

Second round
(Netherlands) Jesse Huta Galung	4	1^{r}
(Germany) Alexander Zverev	6	1
(Germany) Daniel Brands	6	3	6
7	(Hungary) Márton Fucsovics	1	6	3

Qualifying competition
(Germany) Alexander Zverev	1	6	3
(Germany) Daniel Brands	6	3	6
