= 2014 Erste Bank Open =

- Date: 13–19 October
- Edition: 40th
- Category: ATP World Tour 250 Series
- Draw: 28S / 16D
- Prize money: €521,405
- Surface: Hard
- Location: Vienna, Austria
- Venue: Wiener Stadthalle

Champions

Singles
- (United Kingdom) Andy Murray

Doubles
- (Austria) Jürgen Melzer / (Germany) Philipp Petzschner
- Vienna Open

The 2014 Erste Bank Open was a men's tennis tournament played on indoor hard courts. It was the 40th edition of the event known that year as the Erste Bank Open, and part of the ATP World Tour 250 Series of the 2014 ATP World Tour. It was held at the Wiener Stadthalle in Vienna, Austria, from 13 October through 19 October 2014. Second-seeded Andy Murray won the singles title.

== Finals ==
=== Singles ===
- (United Kingdom) Andy Murray defeated (Spain) David Ferrer, 5–7, 6–2, 7–5

=== Doubles ===
- (Austria) Jürgen Melzer / (Germany) Philipp Petzschner defeated (Germany) Andre Begemann / (Austria) Julian Knowle, 7–6^{(8-6)}, 4–6, [10–7]

== Singles main-draw entrants ==
=== Seeds ===
Country	Player	Rank^{1}	Seed
ESP	David Ferrer	5	1
GBR	Andy Murray	11	2
ESP	Feliciano López	21	3
GER	Philipp Kohlschreiber	23	4
CZE	Lukáš Rosol	26	5
CRO	Ivo Karlović	31	6
ESP	Guillermo García López	38	7
AUT	Dominic Thiem	39	8

- Rankings are as of October 6, 2014

=== Other entrants ===
The following players received wildcards into the singles main draw:

- (Spain) David Ferrer
- (Austria) Gerald Melzer
- (United Kingdom) Andy Murray

The following players received entry from the qualifying draw:

- (Germany) Daniel Brands
- (Romania) Victor Hănescu
- (Slovakia) Miloslav Mečíř Jr.
- (Serbia) Viktor Troicki

The following player received entry as a lucky loser:

- (Slovakia) Norbert Gomboš

=== Withdrawals ===
Before the tournament

- (Belgium) David Goffin
- (Spain) Marcel Granollers
- (Poland) Jerzy Janowicz
- (Slovakia) Martin Kližan
- (Luxembourg) Gilles Müller (abdominal muscle strain)
- (Czech Republic) Radek Štěpánek

== Doubles main-draw entrants ==
=== Seeds ===
Country	Player	Country	Player	Rank^{1}	Seed
AUT	Alexander Peya	BRA	Bruno Soares	12	1
POL	Mariusz Fyrstenberg	ESP	David Marrero	52	2
CRO	Marin Draganja	ROU	Florin Mergea	56	3
MEX	Santiago González	CZE	Lukáš Rosol	82	4

- Rankings are as of October 6, 2014

=== Other entrants ===
The following pairs received wildcards into the doubles main draw:

- (Austria) Jürgen Melzer / (Germany) Philipp Petzschner
- (Austria) Dominic Thiem / (Germany) Alexander Zverev

The following pair received entry as alternates:

- (Argentina) Federico Delbonis / (Ukraine) Sergiy Stakhovsky

=== Withdrawals ===
Before the tournament

- (Slovakia) Martin Kližan
