= 2014 BNP Paribas Masters =

- Date: 28 October – 2 November
- Edition: 42nd
- Category: ATP World Tour Masters 1000
- Draw: 48S / 24D
- Prize money: €2,884,675
- Surface: Hard / indoor
- Location: Paris, France
- Venue: Palais omnisports de Paris-Bercy

Champions

Singles
- (Serbia) Novak Djokovic

Doubles
- (United States) Bob Bryan / (United States) Mike Bryan
← 2013 ·	Paris Masters	· 2015 →

The 2014 BNP Paribas Masters was a professional men's tennis tournament played on indoor hard courts. It was the 42nd edition of the tournament, and part of the 2014 ATP World Tour. It took place at the Palais omnisports de Paris-Bercy in Paris, France, between 28 October and 2 November 2014. First-seeded Novak Djokovic won the singles title.

== Points and prize money ==
=== Point distribution ===
Event	W	F	SF	QF	Round of 16	Round of 32	Round of 64	Q	Q2	Q1
Singles	1000	600	360	180	90	45	10	25	16	0
Doubles	1000	600	360	180	90	0	—	—	—	—

=== Prize money ===
Event	W	F	SF	QF	Round of 16	Round of 32	Round of 64	Q2	Q1
Singles	€571,355	€280,145	€141,000	€71,700	€37,230	€19,630	€10,600	€2,345	€1,195
Doubles	€170,000	€83,240	€41,750	€21,430	€11,080	€5,840	—	—	—

== Singles main-draw entrants ==
=== Seeds ===
Country	Player	Rank^{1}	Seed
SRB	Novak Djokovic	1	1
SUI	Roger Federer	2	2
SUI	Stan Wawrinka	4	3
ESP	David Ferrer	5	4
CZE	Tomáš Berdych	6	5
JPN	Kei Nishikori	7	6
CAN	Milos Raonic	9	7
GBR	Andy Murray	10	8
BUL	Grigor Dimitrov	11	9
FRA	Jo-Wilfried Tsonga	12	10
ESP	Roberto Bautista Agut	14	11
ESP	Feliciano López	15	12
USA	John Isner	16	13
RSA	Kevin Anderson	17	14
FRA	Gilles Simon	18	15
ITA	Fabio Fognini	19	16

- ^{1} Rankings are as of 20 October 2014

=== Other entrants ===
The following players received wildcards into the singles main draw:

- (France) Pierre-Hugues Herbert
- (France) Adrian Mannarino
- (France) Édouard Roger-Vasselin

The following player received entry as a special exempt:

- (Belgium) David Goffin

The following player received entry using a protected ranking into the singles main draw:

- (Austria) Jürgen Melzer

The following players received entry from the qualifying draw:

- (France) Kenny de Schepper
- (Uzbekistan) Denis Istomin
- (France) Lucas Pouille
- (United States) Sam Querrey
- (United States) Jack Sock
- (United States) Donald Young

=== Withdrawals ===
Before the tournament

- (Spain) Nicolás Almagro (foot injury) → replaced by (Uruguay) Pablo Cuevas
- (Croatia) Marin Čilić (arm injury) → replaced by (Canada) Vasek Pospisil
- (Argentina) Juan Martín del Potro (wrist injury) → replaced by (Portugal) João Sousa
- (Latvia) Ernests Gulbis (shoulder injury) → replaced by (Poland) Jerzy Janowicz
- (Spain) Rafael Nadal (appendectomy) → replaced by (Spain) Pablo Andújar

=== Retirements ===
- (Uzbekistan) Denis Istomin (right leg injury)
- (Argentina) Leonardo Mayer (back injury)

== Doubles main-draw entrants ==
=== Seeds ===
Country	Player	Country	Player	Rank^{1}	Seed
USA	Bob Bryan	USA	Mike Bryan	2	1
AUT	Alexander Peya	BRA	Bruno Soares	10	2
FRA	Julien Benneteau	FRA	Édouard Roger-Vasselin	17	3
CRO	Ivan Dodig	BRA	Marcelo Melo	19	4
ESP	Marcel Granollers	ESP	Marc López	21	5
CAN	Vasek Pospisil	USA	Jack Sock	29	6
IND	Rohan Bopanna	CAN	Daniel Nestor	31	7
NED	Jean-Julien Rojer	ROU	Horia Tecău	34	8

- Rankings are as of 20 October 2014

=== Other entrants ===
The following pairs received wildcards into the doubles main draw:

- (France) Jérémy Chardy / (France) Kenny de Schepper
- (France) Pierre-Hugues Herbert / (France) Nicolas Mahut

The following pair received entry as alternates:

- (Uruguay) Pablo Cuevas / (Colombia) Santiago Giraldo

=== Withdrawals ===
Before the tournament

- (Argentina) Leonardo Mayer (back injury)

During the tournament

- (Croatia) Ivan Dodig (back injury)
- (United States) Sam Querrey (elbow injury)

== Finals ==
=== Singles ===
- (Serbia) Novak Djokovic defeated (Canada) Milos Raonic, 6–2, 6–3

=== Doubles ===
- (United States) Bob Bryan / (United States) Mike Bryan defeated (Poland) Marcin Matkowski / (Austria) Jürgen Melzer, 7–6^{(7–5)}, 5–7, [10–6]
