= 2014 Shanghai Rolex Masters =

- Date: October 5–12
- Edition: 6th
- Category: ATP World Tour Masters 1000
- Surface: Hard / Outdoor
- Location: Shanghai, China
- Venue: Qizhong Forest Sports City Arena

Champions

Singles
- (Switzerland) Roger Federer

Doubles
- (United States) Bob Bryan / (United States) Mike Bryan
← 2013 ·	Shanghai Masters	· 2015 →

The 2014 Shanghai Rolex Masters was a tennis tournament played on outdoor hard courts. It was the sixth edition of the Shanghai ATP Masters 1000, classified as an ATP World Tour Masters 1000 event on the 2014 ATP World Tour. It took place at Qizhong Forest Sports City Arena in Shanghai, China from October 5 to October 12, 2014.

== Points and prize money ==
=== Point distribution ===
Event	W	F	SF	QF	Round of 16	Round of 32	Round of 64	Q	Q2	Q1
Singles	1000	600	360	180	90	45	10	25	16	0
Doubles	1000	600	360	180	90	0	—	—	—	—

=== Prize money ===
Event	W	F	SF	QF	Round of 16	Round of 32	Round of 64	Q2	Q1
Singles	$798,540	$391,540	$197,060	$100,205	$52,035	$27,435	$14,810	$3,415	$1,740
Doubles	$247,290	$121,070	$60,730	$31,170	$16,110	$8,500	—	—	—

== Singles main-draw entrants ==
=== Seeds ===
Country	Player	Rank^{1}	Seed
SRB	Novak Djokovic	1	1
ESP	Rafael Nadal	2	2
SUI	Roger Federer	3	3
SUI	Stan Wawrinka	4	4
ESP	David Ferrer	5	5
CZE	Tomáš Berdych	6	6
JPN	Kei Nishikori	7	7
CAN	Milos Raonic	8	8
CRO	Marin Čilić	9	9
BUL	Grigor Dimitrov	10	10
GBR	Andy Murray	11	11
LAT	Ernests Gulbis	13	12
USA	John Isner	15	13
ESP	Roberto Bautista Agut	17	14
ITA	Fabio Fognini	18	15
RSA	Kevin Anderson	19	16

- ^{1} Rankings are as of September 29, 2014

=== Other entrants ===
The following players received wildcards into the singles main draw:

- (Argentina) Juan Mónaco
- (China) Wang Chuhan
- (China) Wu Di
- (China) Zhang Ze

The following player received entry as a special exempt:

- (Slovakia) Martin Kližan

The following players received entry from the qualifying draw:

- (Russia) Teymuraz Gabashvili
- (Kazakhstan) Andrey Golubev
- (Australia) Sam Groth
- (Tunisia) Malek Jaziri
- (Australia) Thanasi Kokkinakis
- (Australia) Bernard Tomic
- (United Kingdom) James Ward

=== Withdrawals ===
Before the tournament

- (Spain) Nicolás Almagro → replaced by (Canada) Vasek Pospisil
- (Argentina) Juan Martín del Potro (wrist injury) → replaced by (Austria) Dominic Thiem
- (Germany) Tommy Haas → replaced by (Spain) Pablo Andújar
- (Australia) Lleyton Hewitt → replaced by (United States) Donald Young
- (Germany) Philipp Kohlschreiber → replaced by (United States) Jack Sock
- (France) Gaël Monfils → replaced by (United States) Steve Johnson
- (Czech Republic) Radek Štěpánek → replaced by (Kazakhstan) Mikhail Kukushkin
- (France) Jo-Wilfried Tsonga → replaced by (France) Édouard Roger-Vasselin
- (Spain) Fernando Verdasco → replaced by (Croatia) Ivan Dodig

=== Retirements ===
- (Canada) Milos Raonic (flu)

== Doubles main-draw entrants ==
=== Seeds ===
Country	Player	Country	Player	Rank^{1}	Seed
USA	Bob Bryan	USA	Mike Bryan	2	1
CAN	Daniel Nestor	SRB	Nenad Zimonjić	7	2
AUT	Alexander Peya	BRA	Bruno Soares	12	3
CRO	Ivan Dodig	BRA	Marcelo Melo	13	4
FRA	Julien Benneteau	FRA	Édouard Roger-Vasselin	20	5
ESP	Marcel Granollers	ESP	Marc López	23	6
CAN	Vasek Pospisil	USA	Jack Sock	33	7
NED	Jean-Julien Rojer	ROU	Horia Tecău	37	8

- Rankings are as of September 29, 2014

=== Other entrants ===
The following pairs received wildcards into the doubles main draw:

- (China) Gong Maoxin / (China) Li Zhe
- (China) Wu Di / (China) Zhang Ze

The following pair received entry as alternates:

- (United Kingdom) Jamie Murray / (Australia) John Peers

=== Withdrawals ===
During the tournament

- (Latvia) Ernests Gulbis (shoulder injury)

=== Retirements ===
- (United States) Rajeev Ram (back injury)

== Finals ==
=== Singles ===
- (Switzerland) Roger Federer def. (France) Gilles Simon 7–6^{(8–6)}, 7–6^{(7–2)}

=== Doubles ===
- (United States) Bob Bryan / (United States) Mike Bryan def. (France) Julien Benneteau / (France) Édouard Roger-Vasselin 6–3, 7–6^{(7–3)}
