= 2014 Roger Federer tennis season =

Statistics for Swiss tennis player

- Full name: Roger Federer
- Country: Switzerland
- Calendar prize money: $9,393,122 (singles & doubles)

Singles
- Season record: 73–12
- Calendar titles: 5
- Year-end ranking: No. 2
- Ranking change from previous year: ▲4

Grand Slam & significant results
- Australian Open: SF
- French Open: 4R
- Wimbledon: F
- US Open: SF
- Other tournaments
- Tour Finals: F

Doubles
- Season record: 8–4
- Calendar titles: 0
- Current ranking: No. 100
- Ranking change from previous year: ▲460

Davis Cup
- Davis Cup: W
- Last updated on: 24 November 2014.

Roger Federer's 2014 tennis season officially began on 30 December 2013 with the start of the 2014 Brisbane International. This season was a resurgent season for Federer after a poor 2013 season. Before the start of the season Federer appointed Stefan Edberg as his coach and he also changed racquets for the first time, moving on from his longtime frame of 90 square inches to a 97 square inch frame. Federer reached a total of 11 finals, the most since his 2007 season. One of those finals included the Wimbledon final, his first major final since he won Wimbledon in 2012. After winning Shanghai, Federer returned to No. 2 in the world for the first time since May 2013. He also won the Davis Cup for the first time. Federer ended the year at No. 2 with 5 titles and with the most match wins since 2006.

== Year summary ==
=== Australian Open and early hard court season ===
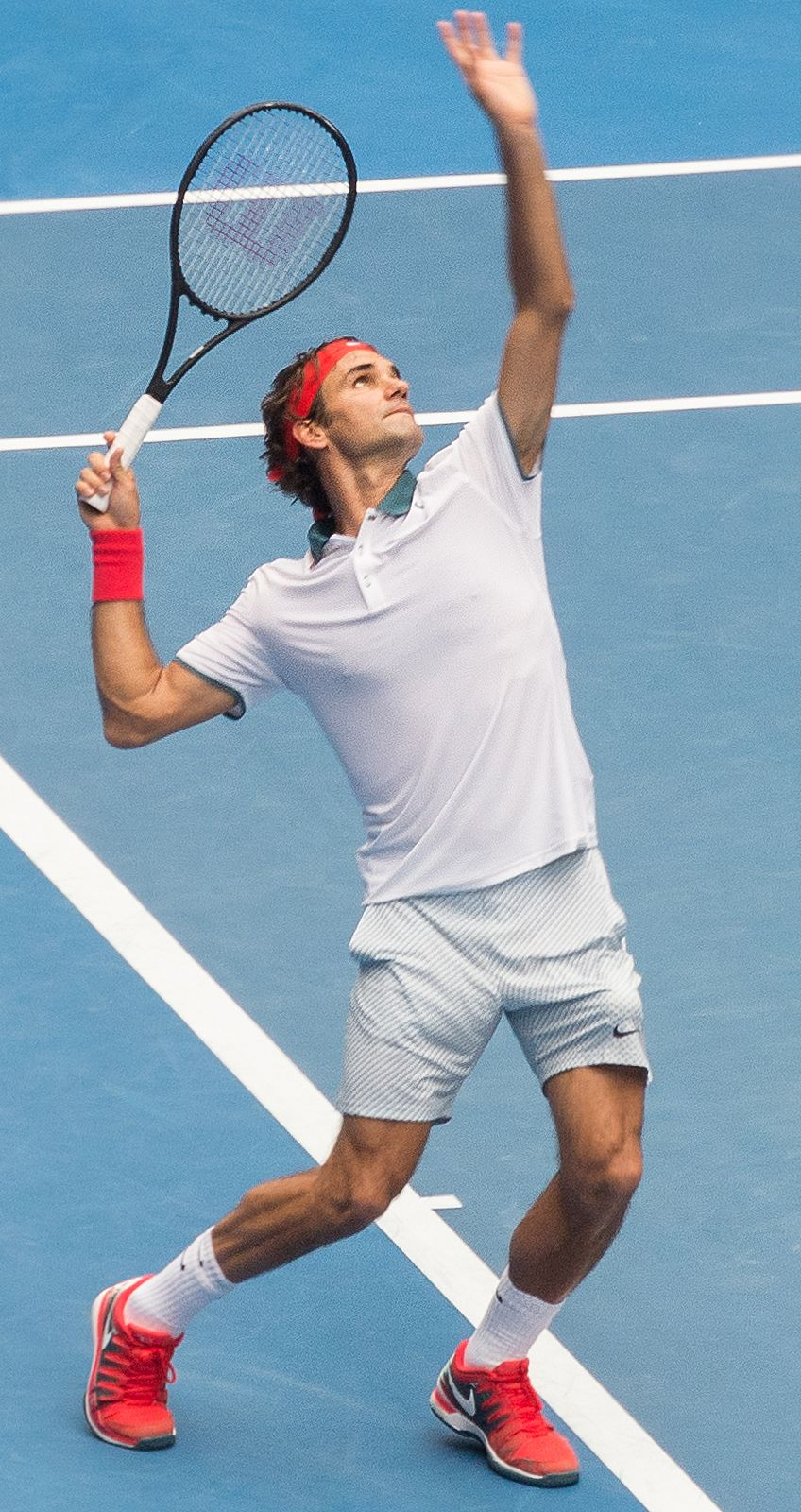
Federer at the 2014 Australian Open.

==== Brisbane International ====
Federer opened his season at the Brisbane International in Brisbane. His first match was in the second round against Jarkko Nieminen of Finland. Though Nieminen challenged Federer in the first set with some aggressive play, Federer ultimately won the first set and went on to win the next set, and the match, handily, continuing his undefeated record against Nieminen. He next played Marinko Matosevic of Australia in the quarterfinals and swept him in straight sets under an hour, allowing only two games to Matosevic. Federer next played Jérémy Chardy of France, whom he had defeated in doubles earlier in the tournament, for the first time in singles in the semifinals. Federer won the first set after breaking Chardy, but Chardy matched Federer in the second set, forcing a tiebreak during which Chardy pulled away from Federer to even the match. The third set looked to be close, but Federer found a break near the end of the set and closed out the match in just under two hours. Lleyton Hewitt won in the final against Federer.

==== Australian Open ====
Federer's next contest was the men's singles event of the 2014 Australian Open in Melbourne. His appearance at the 2014 Australian Open marked a record-breaking 57 straight Grand Slam appearances. He finished in the semifinals last year, losing to Andy Murray in five sets. Federer was the sixth seed in the tournament, and began his tournament by playing Australian wildcard James Duckworth in the first round, breaking him four times en route to a straight-sets win. He then played Blaž Kavčič of Slovenia in the second round. Federer swept through the first two sets, but errors in the third set allowed Kavčič to force a tiebreak, which Federer won to close out the match. Federer broke him six times in total and won seven of the last eight points in the tiebreak to win his seventieth match in Melbourne. Federer played Teymuraz Gabashvili of Russia in the third round for the first time in six years. He saved five break points and broke Gabashvili's serve five times en route to a straight-sets victory. Federer played Jo-Wilfried Tsonga of France in the fourth round, and won in straight sets. Federer found breaks in each set, including one at the beginning of the first set, and dictated at the net, using aggressive play to keep Tsonga at bay. With his win, Federer reached his eleventh consecutive Australian Open quarterfinal, and has now reached 41 Grand Slam quarterfinals, tying the all-time record held by Jimmy Connors. Federer faced Andy Murray in the quarter-finals and defeated him in four sets after missing several break opportunities and squandering two match points in the third set tiebreak. Federer lost to Rafael Nadal in the semifinals, in straight sets.

==== Davis Cup World Group 1R ====
Federer would make a shocking announcement stating that he would participate for Switzerland in the World Group, his first time doing so since 2012. He along with compatriots Stanislas Wawrinka, Marco Chiudinelli and Michael Lammer would help Switzerland defeat Serbia, defeating Ilija Bozoljac in his first round rubber. Federer's win would help Switzerland advance to play Kazakhstan in the Quarterfinals beating Serbia 3–2.

==== Dubai Tennis Championships ====
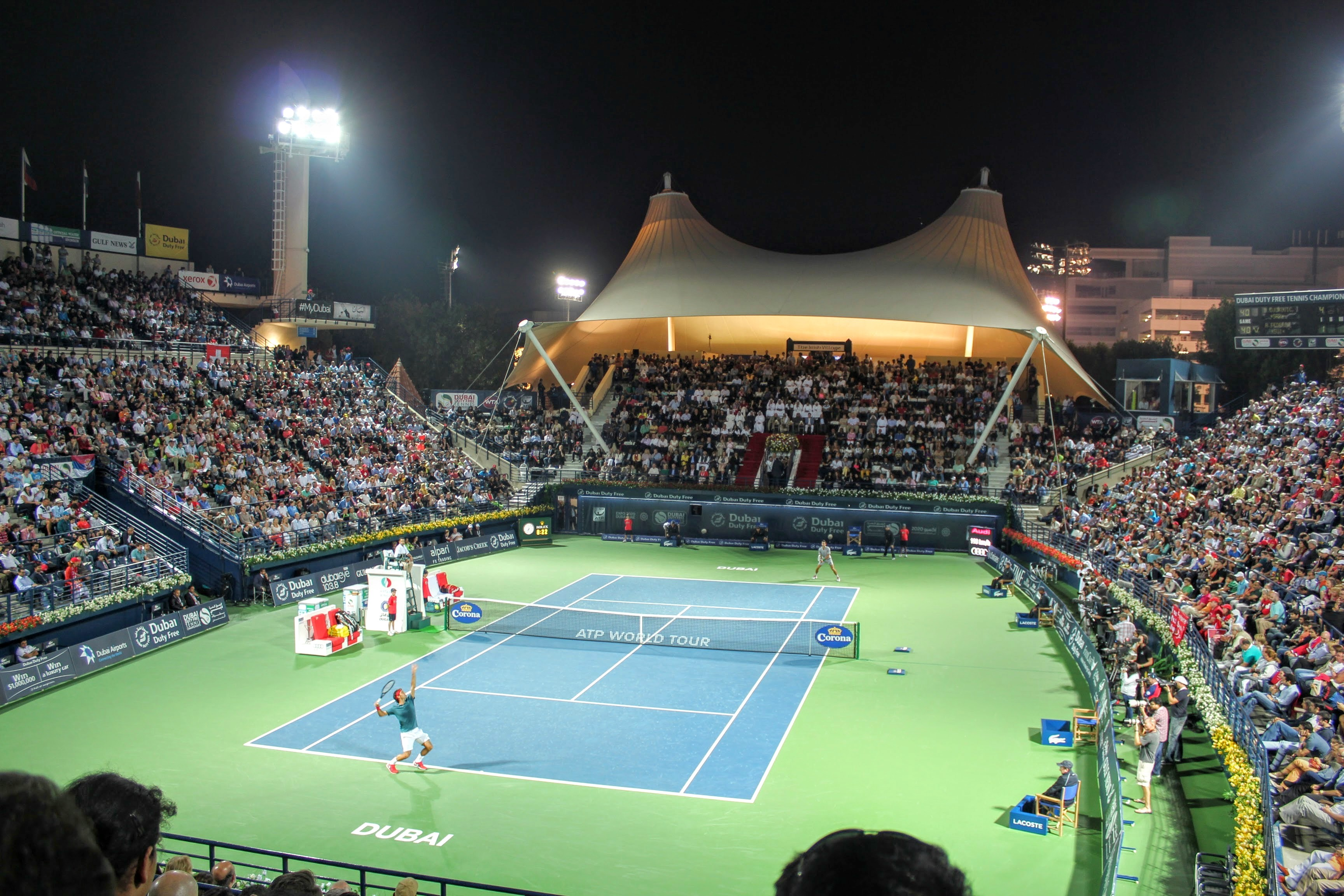
Federer defeated Djokovic in the semifinals of Dubai.

After playing in the Davis Cup Federer took a three-week break and returned to competition at the Dubai Tennis Championships. Federer won his opening match against Benjamin Becker in the opening round with ease, and faced Radek Štěpánek in the second round. After a solid first set by Federer, Štěpánek tied the match after winning the second-set tiebreak. Federer then climbed out of a three-game deficit in the third set, winning five straight games to seal the match. In the quarterfinals, Federer played his first match against Lukáš Rosol of the Czech Republic. After having his serve broken in the first game, he won the next six games to clinch the first set and held his serve in the second to win the match in straight sets in just under an hour. Federer faced defending champion Novak Djokovic in the semifinals, and dropped the first set to Djokovic. After a rain delay in the second set, Federer converted breaks in the second and third sets against Djokovic and won his first match against Djokovic in 18 months. This was also the first time he had beaten Djokovic after dropping the first set. Federer then played Tomáš Berdych, who had beaten him in the semifinals last year. The two exchanged breaks in the first, but Berdych secured another break and won the first set. In the second set, Berdych broke Federer again, but Federer took advantage of errors on Berdych's part to get two breaks and level the match at one set all. Federer claimed a crucial break in a tighter third set, and held the lead to win in just under two hours. Federer won a record sixth Dubai title and won his 78th career title, surpassing John McEnroe for the third-most titles won in the Open Era. The win also ensured that he would continue his streak of winning at least one title per year since 2001.

==== Indian Wells Masters ====
Federer next played at the Indian Wells Masters in Indian Wells. After a bye in the first round, Federer played Frenchman Paul-Henri Mathieu, and defeated him in straight sets, winning three break points and a second-set tiebreak. He then played Dmitry Tursunov of Russia in the third round. Federer and Tursunov both won two break points against each other, and Tursunov forced tiebreaks in both the first and second sets. Federer, however, won both of the tiebreaks, taking the match in straight sets. He then met Tommy Haas in the fourth round, and won in straight sets, though Haas kept the match close. Federer played Kevin Anderson of South Africa in the quarterfinals. In the first set, Anderson held off Federer on numerous break point opportunities, but Federer broke in the last game of the set to take the lead. Federer then jumped out to a five-game lead in the second set, and won the match in straight sets. Federer then played first-time semifinalist Alexandr Dolgopolov in the semifinals, and raced through the match, winning four break points and allowing Dolgopolov only four games en route to a win in just over an hour. Federer was narrowly defeated in the final by Novak Djokovic in a final set tie-break.

==== Miami Open ====
Federer next played the Miami Open in Miami. He played Ivo Karlović in the second round after a bye in the first round. Federer broke Karlović early in the first set and, after holding to take the lead, defeated Karlović in the second-set tiebreak. Federer then cruised into the quarterfinals, beating Thiemo de Bakker and Richard Gasquet both in straight sets. However, in one of the tour's biggest upsets, Kei Nishikori would improve his head-to-head record against Federer to 2–1, beating Federer in three sets. Unfortunately, Nishikori would retire before his semifinal match, most probably sustaining a groin injury during their quarterfinal meeting.

==== Davis Cup World Group QF ====
Switzerland played against Kazakhstan in the quarterfinals. This was the first time Federer had played in the Davis Cup quarterfinals since 2004. Federer defeated Mikhail Kukushkin to equalize the tie at 1-1. Federer and Wawrinka then played doubles but fell in four sets. After Wawrinka brought the Swiss to parity at 2-2, Federer was tasked with winning the first deciding fifth live rubber of his career. Federer led the Swiss to a 3–2 victory by defeating Andrey Golubev in straight sets.

=== Spring clay court season and French Open ===
==== Monte-Carlo Masters ====
Federer began his clay season with a wildcard entry into the Monte-Carlo Masters. Federer experienced great success during his second and third round meetings against Radek Štěpánek and Lukáš Rosol, defeating both in straight sets. He then defeated Jo-Wilfried Tsonga from a set down for the first time in his career, in a match where he failed to convert any of his first 15 break points. He ousted world No. 2 and defending champion Novak Djokovic in the semifinals, ending the Serb's unbeaten run in Masters 1000 tournaments dating back to the 2013 Shanghai Masters. He lost his fourth Monte Carlo final, this time to compatriot Stanislas Wawrinka.

==== Madrid Open ====
Federer was seeded 4th, but withdrew from the tournament to be with his pregnant wife, Mirka. On May 6, he announced that they became parents to twins again, this time boys – Leo and Lenny.

==== Italian Open ====
Federer next played in Rome at the Italian Open, where he was a three-time finalist, including in 2013. He was seeded 4th. He suffered a shock defeat to Jérémy Chardy in a final-set tiebreaker in the second round, after having match point. The loss was the first time in 2014 that Federer had failed to match or better his result at a tournament compared to the previous season.

==== French Open ====
Federer started his 2014 French Open campaign with a comfortable straight sets victory over Lukáš Lacko. He followed this up with another straight sets victory over Argentine qualifier Diego Sebastien Schwartzman in the second round. Federer defeated Dimitry Tursunov in the third round in four sets, in their first meeting on a clay court. Federer was upset in the fourth round by Ernest Gulbis, who leveled their head-to-head record with a victory in five sets. The loss snapped Federer's streak of nine straight French Open quarterfinals.

=== Grass court season and Wimbledon ===
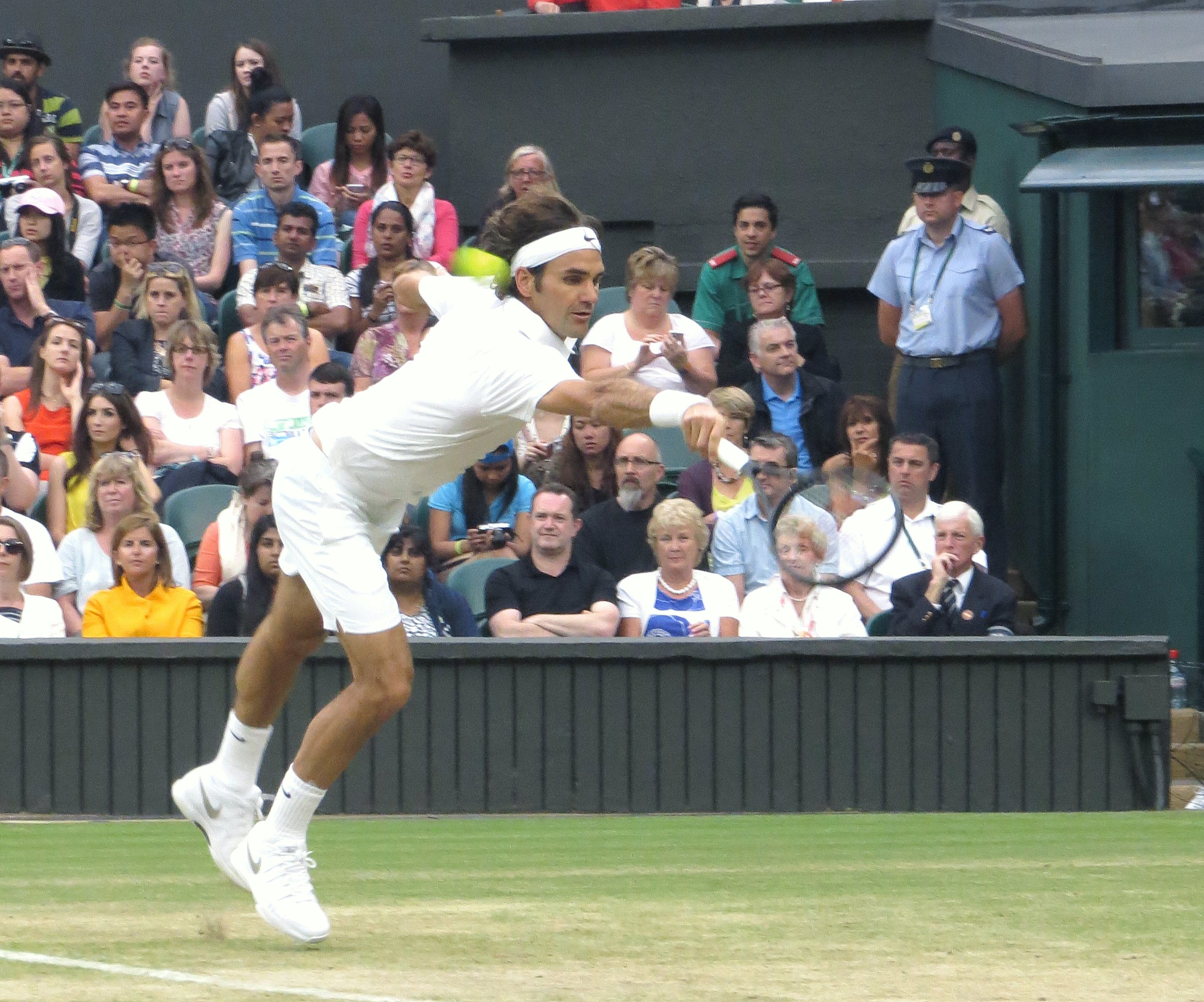
Federer at the 2014 Wimbledon Championships.

==== Halle Open ====
Following a first round bye, Federer came from a set down to defeat João Sousa. After receiving a walkover in the quarterfinals, Federer defeated fourth seed Kei Nishikori to reach his ninth singles final at the Halle Open. Federer successfully defended his title and won a record seventh Halle Open singles title, beating Alejandro Falla in the final in two tiebreak sets. It was Federer's 14th grass court title, extending his open era record, and his 79th career singles title.

==== Wimbledon ====
Federer dispatched Paolo Lorenzi, Gilles Müller, Santiago Giraldo, and Tommy Robredo without dropping a set or losing serve. In doing so, he reached his 42nd major quarterfinal, surpassing the previous all-time record of 41 set by Jimmy Connors. He defeated compatriot Stan Wawrinka in four sets in the first all-Swiss Wimbledon men's quarterfinal in history, then defeated Milos Raonic in a record 35th major semifinal. This extended Federer's record in Wimbledon semi finals to 9–0, and 27–1 in sets. In the final, he was defeated by Novak Djokovic in an epic five set match.

=== North American hard court season and the US Open ===
==== Canadian Open ====
Federer would participate in this years Canadian Open for the first time since 2011. The two-time champ was seeded second due to Rafael Nadal's injury and would be given a bye into the second round. Federer would have a speedy dispatch of Canadian wildcard Peter Polansky, advancing to the round of sixteen where he defeated Marin Čilić in a three set thriller match. He went on to beat David Ferrer in the quarter-final in three tight sets. In the semi-final, he defeated Lopez easily in straight sets. In his 37th final at the ATP World Tour Masters 1000 level Federer was defeated by Jo-Wilfried Tsonga and remained one match shy of becoming the first man to win 300 matches at the masters 1000 level.

==== Cincinnati Masters ====
Federer was seeded second again due to Rafael Nadal's wrist injury. He played against Canadian Vasek Pospisil in the second round, defeating him in three sets. With that win, he became the first man to win 300 matches at the Masters 1000 level. In the third round, he played against Frenchman Gaël Monfils where he defeated him in three sets. In the quarterfinal, he played Andy Murray, beating him in straight sets after recovering from double-break down in the second set. The victory drew Federer even with Murray head-to-head at 11–11. He easily defeated Milos Raonic in the semifinal with a comfortable straight sets victory over the Canadian. In the final, Federer defeated Spain's David Ferrer in three sets to capture his record sixth Cincinnati crown and 22nd ATP World Tour Masters 1000 title. It was also his 80th ATP singles title. He also improved to a perfect 6–0 in Cincinnati finals and to a 16–0 head-to-head record against the 32-year-old Ferrer and secured third place in the 2014 US Open Series. Also with the win, Federer qualified for the season-ending championship, securing a return to the ATP World Tour Finals for a record 13th consecutive year.

==== US Open ====
Federer was seeded second, following Rafael Nadal's withdrawal due to a right wrist injury, at Flushing Meadows and was looking to win the title for a record sixth time. He started his bid for an 18th Grand Slam championship crown against Marinko Matosevic with a straight sets victory, his 50th win of the season, and faced off another Australian, Sam Groth, in the second round, where he managed to beat the big-serving player in straight sets despite a few exchanges of breaks. In the third round, he was tested by the Spaniard Marcel Granollers as he dropped the first set of the tournament but was dominant in the following three sets. He battled another Spaniard, Roberto Bautista Agut, in the round of sixteen, defeating him in straight sets. In the quarterfinal, he defeated Frenchman Gaël Monfils, fighting back from a two-set deficit for the ninth time in his career and saving two match points in the fourth set. Federer then fell in straight sets in his semifinal match to a resurgent Marin Čilić, who went on to win the tournament. With the loss, it became the first time since the 2005 Australian Open that neither Federer, Nadal, or Djokovic featured in the final.

==== Davis Cup World Group SF ====
Switzerland played against Italy in the semifinals. This was the first time Federer had played in the Davis Cup semifinals since 2003. Both Federer and Wawrinka won their respective singles rubbers on the first day against Simone Bolelli and Fabio Fognini in straight sets. Having a 2–0 lead over Italy, Federer elected not to play the doubles rubber where Wawrinka and Marco Chiudinelli lost in five sets. Federer would secure a place in the Davis Cup final with a straight sets victory over Fabio Fognini. Switzerland will next play against France in the Davis Cup finals in November, hoping to improve upon their best Davis Cup result as Finalists in 1992.

=== Asian swing ===
==== Shanghai Masters ====
In his second round match, Federer beat Argentinian Leonardo Mayer winning in three close sets after being down 2–5 in the third set tiebreak, saving 5 match points, the first two being saved at 4–5 15–40 in the third set, and the other three being saved in the third set tiebreak. He played Spaniard Roberto Bautista Agut and defeated him in straight sets in the third round and went on to beat Frenchman Julien Benneteau in the quarterfinal, then played one of the best BO3 games of his career to beat world’s No. 1 Novak Djokovic in the semifinals, ending the Serb's 28-match unbeaten run on Chinese soil. He battled Frenchman Gilles Simon in his second Shanghai final, defeated him in two tiebreak sets and collected his 23rd Masters 1000 title of his career. This was the first time Federer had won the Shanghai Masters and the first tournament he had won in China since the Masters Cup in 2007. As a result of his victory Federer passed Rafael Nadal for number two in the world rankings, marking his highest ranking since May 2013.

=== European indoor season ===
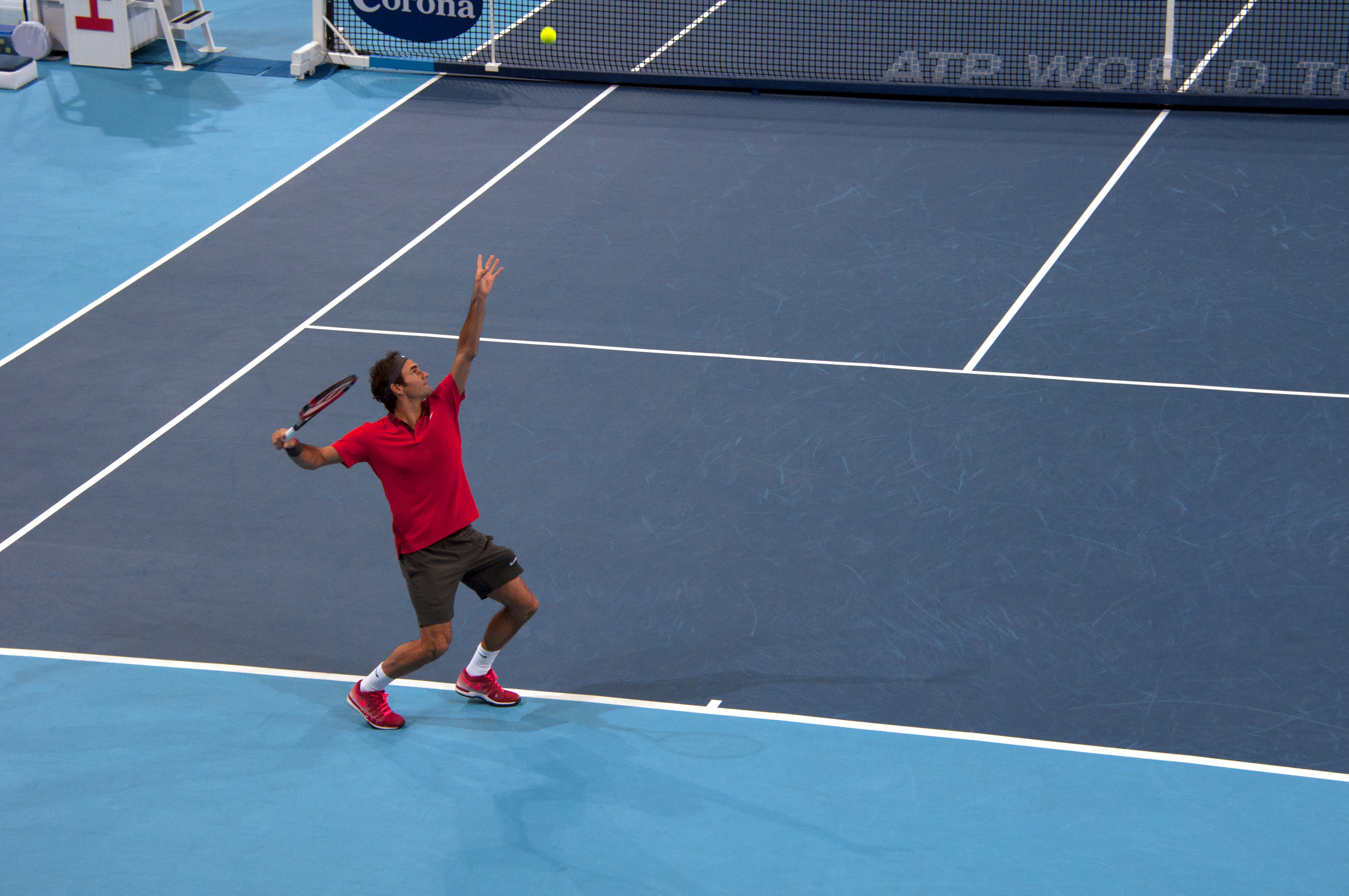
Roger Federer captured a record 6th title at the Swiss Indoors

==== Swiss Indoors ====
Federer defeated Gilles Müller in the first round. In the second round Federer came back from a set down to defeat Denis Istomin. In the quarterfinals Federer defeated Grigor Dimitrov in straight sets to reach his twelfth semifinal at the Swiss Indoors. In the semifinals, Federer defeated Ivo Karlović and reached an eleventh final (and ninth consecutive) at the Swiss Indoors, setting an all-time record for the most finals reached at a single tournament. In the finals, Federer defeated David Goffin to win a record 6th title.

==== Paris Masters ====
Federer began the tournament with a tight three set victory over Jérémy Chardy, then defeated qualifier Lucas Pouille. His run ended in the quarterfinals, when he lost to a determined Milos Raonic for the first time in seven meetings.

==== ATP World Tour Finals ====
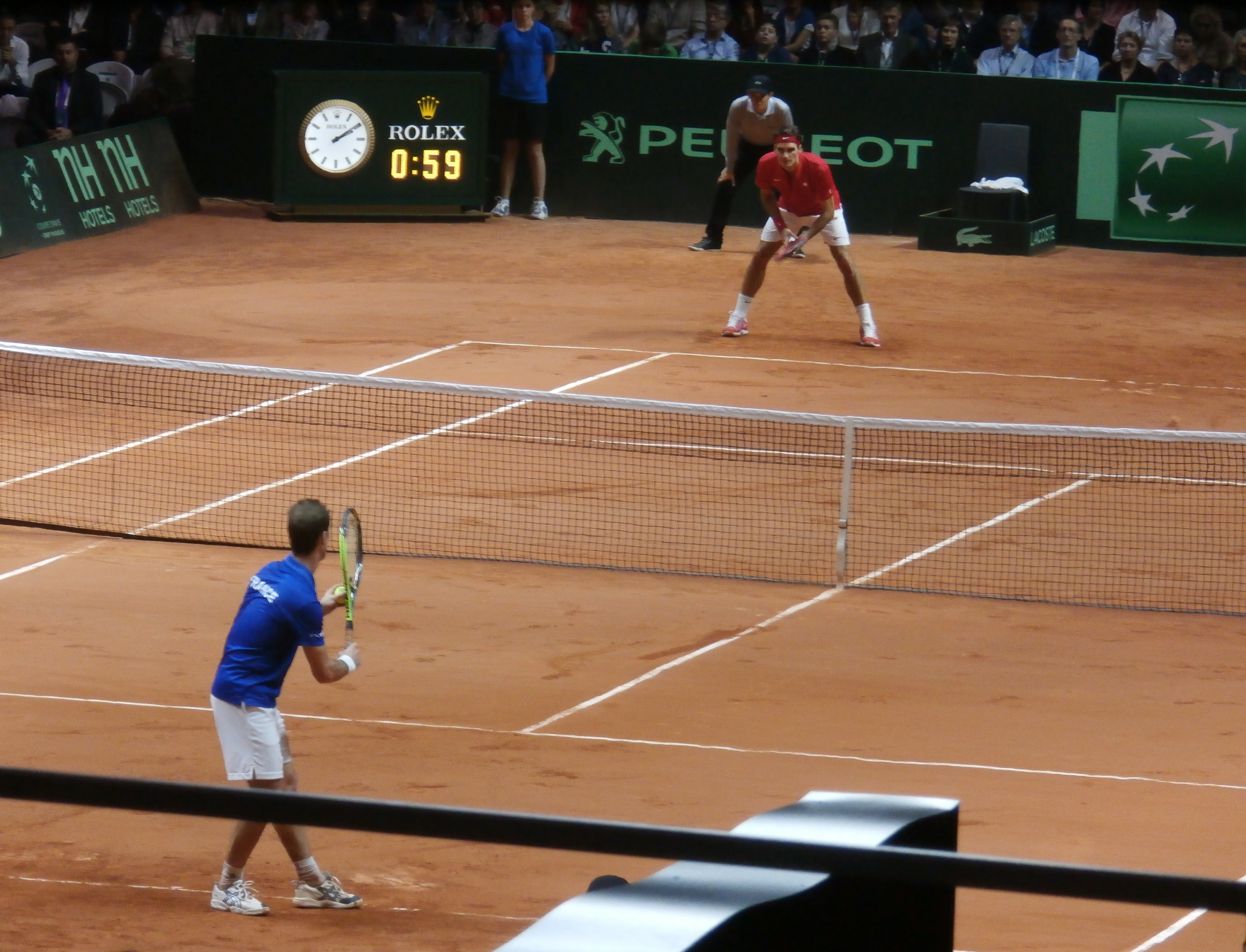
Federer plays Gasquet in the clinching match of the Davis Cup final.

Federer began his record-setting thirteenth consecutive year-end championships tournament with straight-sets victories over Milos Raonic and Kei Nishikori in round-robin play. He continued this streak, breezing past Andy Murray, winning his first ever bageled set against him in his 250th indoor court victory. With this win Federer took a lead in their head-to-head matchup 12–11 for the first time since 2005 when they first met. He also became the first of the Big Four to win a 6–0 set against all three rivals. With the win, Federer advanced to the semifinals of the Tour Finals for a record-tying twelfth time. He defeated his friend and compatriot Stan Wawrinka in a highly competitive three-set semifinal, coming from a set down and saving four match points, in order to make his ninth final at the year-end championships. Due to injury, he withdrew before the final; this was only the third time in his career that he had withdrawn from a tournament.

==== Davis Cup World Group Final ====
Federer arrived in Lille but was unable to practice for most of the week because of the back injury he suffered at the World Tour Finals just days before. Following Stan Wawrinka's victory in the first rubber, a rusty Federer could not overcome a sensational performance by Gaël Monfils and was defeated in straight sets. Federer and Wawrinka played the doubles rubber against Richard Gasquet and Julien Benneteau and recorded their first win together in doubles since 2011 to give Switzerland a 2–1 lead heading into the final Sunday of the season. Federer played the fourth rubber against Gasquet, who was a late substitution for Jo-Wilfried Tsonga, and emerged victorious to deliver Switzerland its first Davis Cup victory in history.

== All matches ==
=== Singles matches ===
Tournament	Match	Round	Opponent (seed or key)	Rank	Result	Score
Brisbane International; Brisbane, Australia; ATP World Tour 250; Hard, outdoor 30 December 2013 – 5 January 2014	–	1R	Bye			
Brisbane International; Brisbane, Australia; ATP World Tour 250; Hard, outdoor 30 December 2013 – 5 January 2014	1139	2R	(Finland) Jarkko Nieminen	39	Win	6–4, 6–2
Brisbane International; Brisbane, Australia; ATP World Tour 250; Hard, outdoor 30 December 2013 – 5 January 2014	1140	QF	(Australia) Marinko Matosevic	61	Win	6–1, 6–1
Brisbane International; Brisbane, Australia; ATP World Tour 250; Hard, outdoor 30 December 2013 – 5 January 2014	1141	SF	(France) Jérémy Chardy	34	Win	6–3, 6–7^{(3–7)}, 6–3
Brisbane International; Brisbane, Australia; ATP World Tour 250; Hard, outdoor 30 December 2013 – 5 January 2014	1142	F	(Australia) Lleyton Hewitt	60	Loss (1)	1–6, 6–4, 3–6
Australian Open; Melbourne, Australia; Grand Slam; Hard, outdoor 13–26 January 2014	1143	1R	(Australia) James Duckworth	133	Win	6–4, 6–4, 6–2
Australian Open; Melbourne, Australia; Grand Slam; Hard, outdoor 13–26 January 2014	1144	2R	(Slovenia) Blaž Kavčič	99	Win	6–2, 6–1, 7–6^{(7–4)}
Australian Open; Melbourne, Australia; Grand Slam; Hard, outdoor 13–26 January 2014	1145	3R	(Russia) Teymuraz Gabashvili	79	Win	6–2, 6–2, 6–3
Australian Open; Melbourne, Australia; Grand Slam; Hard, outdoor 13–26 January 2014	1146	4R	(France) Jo-Wilfried Tsonga	10	Win	6–3, 7–5, 6–4
Australian Open; Melbourne, Australia; Grand Slam; Hard, outdoor 13–26 January 2014	1147	QF	(United Kingdom) Andy Murray	4	Win	6–3, 6–4, 6–7^{(6–8)}, 6–3
Australian Open; Melbourne, Australia; Grand Slam; Hard, outdoor 13–26 January 2014	1148	SF	(Spain) Rafael Nadal	1	Loss	6–7^{(4–7)}, 3–6, 3–6
Davis Cup, World Group First round Novi Sad, Serbia; Davis Cup; Hard, indoor 31 January – 2 February 2014	1149	RR	(Serbia) Ilija Bozoljac	268	Win	6–4, 7–5, 6–2
Dubai Duty Free Tennis Championships; Dubai, United Arab Emirates; ATP World Tour 500; Hard, outdoor 24 February – 2 March 2014	1150	1R	(Germany) Benjamin Becker	90	Win	6–1, 6–4
Dubai Duty Free Tennis Championships; Dubai, United Arab Emirates; ATP World Tour 500; Hard, outdoor 24 February – 2 March 2014	1151	2R	(Czech Republic) Radek Štěpánek	48	Win	6–2, 6–7^{(4–7)}, 6–3
Dubai Duty Free Tennis Championships; Dubai, United Arab Emirates; ATP World Tour 500; Hard, outdoor 24 February – 2 March 2014	1152	QF	(Czech Republic) Lukáš Rosol	49	Win	6–2, 6–2
Dubai Duty Free Tennis Championships; Dubai, United Arab Emirates; ATP World Tour 500; Hard, outdoor 24 February – 2 March 2014	1153	SF	(Serbia) Novak Djokovic	2	Win	3–6, 6–3, 6–2
Dubai Duty Free Tennis Championships; Dubai, United Arab Emirates; ATP World Tour 500; Hard, outdoor 24 February – 2 March 2014	1154	W	(Czech Republic) Tomáš Berdych	6	Win (1)	3–6, 6–4, 6–3
BNP Paribas Open; Indian Wells, United States; ATP World Tour Masters 1000; Hard, outdoor 3–16 March 2014	–	1R	Bye			
BNP Paribas Open; Indian Wells, United States; ATP World Tour Masters 1000; Hard, outdoor 3–16 March 2014	1155	2R	(France) Paul-Henri Mathieu	123	Win	6–2, 7–6^{(7–5)}
BNP Paribas Open; Indian Wells, United States; ATP World Tour Masters 1000; Hard, outdoor 3–16 March 2014	1156	3R	(Russia) Dmitry Tursunov	30	Win	7–6^{(9–7)}, 7–6^{(7–2)}
BNP Paribas Open; Indian Wells, United States; ATP World Tour Masters 1000; Hard, outdoor 3–16 March 2014	1157	4R	(Germany) Tommy Haas	12	Win	6–4, 6–4
BNP Paribas Open; Indian Wells, United States; ATP World Tour Masters 1000; Hard, outdoor 3–16 March 2014	1158	QF	(South Africa) Kevin Anderson	18	Win	7–5, 6–1
BNP Paribas Open; Indian Wells, United States; ATP World Tour Masters 1000; Hard, outdoor 3–16 March 2014	1159	SF	(Ukraine) Alexandr Dolgopolov	31	Win	6–3, 6–1
BNP Paribas Open; Indian Wells, United States; ATP World Tour Masters 1000; Hard, outdoor 3–16 March 2014	1160	F	(Serbia) Novak Djokovic	2	Loss (2)	6–3, 3–6, 6–7^{(3–7)}
Sony Open Tennis; Miami, United States; ATP World Tour Masters 1000; Hard, outdoor 17–30 March 2014	–	1R	Bye			
Sony Open Tennis; Miami, United States; ATP World Tour Masters 1000; Hard, outdoor 17–30 March 2014	1161	2R	(Croatia) Ivo Karlović	53	Win	6–4, 7–6^{(7–4)}
Sony Open Tennis; Miami, United States; ATP World Tour Masters 1000; Hard, outdoor 17–30 March 2014	1162	3R	(Netherlands) Thiemo de Bakker	162	Win	6–3, 6–3
Sony Open Tennis; Miami, United States; ATP World Tour Masters 1000; Hard, outdoor 17–30 March 2014	1163	4R	(France) Richard Gasquet	9	Win	6–1, 6–2
Sony Open Tennis; Miami, United States; ATP World Tour Masters 1000; Hard, outdoor 17–30 March 2014	1164	QF	(Japan) Kei Nishikori	21	Loss	6–3, 5–7, 4–6
Davis Cup, World Group Quarterfinals; Geneva, Switzerland; Davis Cup; Hard, indoor 4–6 April 2014	1165	RR	(Kazakhstan) Mikhail Kukushkin	56	Win	6–4, 6–4, 6–2
Davis Cup, World Group Quarterfinals; Geneva, Switzerland; Davis Cup; Hard, indoor 4–6 April 2014	1166	RR	(Kazakhstan) Andrey Golubev	64	Win	7–6^{(7–0)}, 6–2, 6–3
Monte-Carlo Rolex Masters; Monte Carlo, Monaco; ATP World Tour Masters 1000; Clay, outdoor 12–20 April 2014	–	1R	Bye			
Monte-Carlo Rolex Masters; Monte Carlo, Monaco; ATP World Tour Masters 1000; Clay, outdoor 12–20 April 2014	1167	2R	(Czech Republic) Radek Štěpánek	41	Win	6–1, 6–2
Monte-Carlo Rolex Masters; Monte Carlo, Monaco; ATP World Tour Masters 1000; Clay, outdoor 12–20 April 2014	1168	3R	(Czech Republic) Lukáš Rosol	47	Win	6–4, 6–1
Monte-Carlo Rolex Masters; Monte Carlo, Monaco; ATP World Tour Masters 1000; Clay, outdoor 12–20 April 2014	1169	QF	(France) Jo-Wilfried Tsonga	12	Win	2–6, 7–6^{(8–6)}, 6–1
Monte-Carlo Rolex Masters; Monte Carlo, Monaco; ATP World Tour Masters 1000; Clay, outdoor 12–20 April 2014	1170	SF	(Serbia) Novak Djokovic	2	Win	7–5, 6–2
Monte-Carlo Rolex Masters; Monte Carlo, Monaco; ATP World Tour Masters 1000; Clay, outdoor 12–20 April 2014	1171	F	(Switzerland) Stanislas Wawrinka	3	Loss (3)	6–4, 6–7^{(5–7)}, 2–6
Internazionali BNL d'Italia; Rome, Italy; ATP World Tour Masters 1000; Clay, outdoor 12–18 May 2014	–	1R	Bye			
Internazionali BNL d'Italia; Rome, Italy; ATP World Tour Masters 1000; Clay, outdoor 12–18 May 2014	1172	2R	(France) Jérémy Chardy	49	Loss	6–1, 3–6, 6–7^{(6–8)}
French Open; Paris, France; Grand Slam; Clay, outdoor 26 May – 8 June 2014	1173	1R	(Slovakia) Lukáš Lacko	87	Win	6–2, 6–4, 6–2
French Open; Paris, France; Grand Slam; Clay, outdoor 26 May – 8 June 2014	1174	2R	(Argentina) Diego Sebastián Schwartzman	109	Win	6–3, 6–4, 6–4
French Open; Paris, France; Grand Slam; Clay, outdoor 26 May – 8 June 2014	1175	3R	(Russia) Dmitry Tursunov	32	Win	7–5, 6–7^{(7–9)}, 6–2, 6–4
French Open; Paris, France; Grand Slam; Clay, outdoor 26 May – 8 June 2014	1176	4R	(Latvia) Ernests Gulbis	17	Loss	7–6^{(7–5)}, 6–7^{(3–7)}, 2–6, 6–4, 3–6
Gerry Weber Open; Halle, Germany; ATP World Tour 250; Grass, outdoor 9–15 June 2014	–	1R	Bye			
Gerry Weber Open; Halle, Germany; ATP World Tour 250; Grass, outdoor 9–15 June 2014	1177	2R	(Portugal) João Sousa	44	Win	6–7^{(8–10)}, 6–4, 6–2
Gerry Weber Open; Halle, Germany; ATP World Tour 250; Grass, outdoor 9–15 June 2014	–	QF	(Chinese Taipei) Yen-Hsun Lu	48	Walkover	N/A
Gerry Weber Open; Halle, Germany; ATP World Tour 250; Grass, outdoor 9–15 June 2014	1178	SF	(Japan) Kei Nishikori	12	Win	6–3, 7–6^{(7–4)}
Gerry Weber Open; Halle, Germany; ATP World Tour 250; Grass, outdoor 9–15 June 2014	1179	W	(Colombia) Alejandro Falla	69	Win (2)	7–6^{(7–2)}, 7–6^{(7–3)}
Wimbledon Championships; London, United Kingdom; Grand Slam; Grass, outdoor 23 June – 6 July 2014	1180	1R	(Italy) Paolo Lorenzi	83	Win	6–1, 6–1, 6–3
Wimbledon Championships; London, United Kingdom; Grand Slam; Grass, outdoor 23 June – 6 July 2014	1181	2R	(Luxembourg) Gilles Müller	103	Win	6–3, 7–5, 6–3
Wimbledon Championships; London, United Kingdom; Grand Slam; Grass, outdoor 23 June – 6 July 2014	1182	3R	(Colombia) Santiago Giraldo	35	Win	6–3, 6–1, 6–3
Wimbledon Championships; London, United Kingdom; Grand Slam; Grass, outdoor 23 June – 6 July 2014	1183	4R	(Spain) Tommy Robredo	22	Win	6–1, 6–4, 6–4
Wimbledon Championships; London, United Kingdom; Grand Slam; Grass, outdoor 23 June – 6 July 2014	1184	QF	(Switzerland) Stan Wawrinka	3	Win	3–6, 7–6^{(7–5)}, 6–4, 6–4
Wimbledon Championships; London, United Kingdom; Grand Slam; Grass, outdoor 23 June – 6 July 2014	1185	SF	(Canada) Milos Raonic	9	Win	6–4, 6–4, 6–4
Wimbledon Championships; London, United Kingdom; Grand Slam; Grass, outdoor 23 June – 6 July 2014	1186	F	(Serbia) Novak Djokovic	2	Loss (4)	7–6^{(9–7)}, 4–6, 6–7^{(4–7)}, 7–5, 4–6
Rogers Cup; Toronto, Canada; ATP World Tour Masters 1000; Hard, outdoor 4–10 August 2014	–	1R	Bye			
Rogers Cup; Toronto, Canada; ATP World Tour Masters 1000; Hard, outdoor 4–10 August 2014	1187	2R	(Canada) Peter Polansky	129	Win	6–2, 6–0
Rogers Cup; Toronto, Canada; ATP World Tour Masters 1000; Hard, outdoor 4–10 August 2014	1188	3R	(Croatia) Marin Čilić	18	Win	7–6^{(7–5)}, 6–7^{(3–7)}, 6–4
Rogers Cup; Toronto, Canada; ATP World Tour Masters 1000; Hard, outdoor 4–10 August 2014	1189	QF	(Spain) David Ferrer	7	Win	6–3, 4–6, 6–3
Rogers Cup; Toronto, Canada; ATP World Tour Masters 1000; Hard, outdoor 4–10 August 2014	1190	SF	(Spain) Feliciano López	25	Win	6–3, 6–4
Rogers Cup; Toronto, Canada; ATP World Tour Masters 1000; Hard, outdoor 4–10 August 2014	1191	F	(France) Jo-Wilfried Tsonga	15	Loss (5)	5–7, 6–7^{(3–7)}
Western & Southern Open; Cincinnati, United States; ATP World Tour Masters 1000; Hard, outdoor 11–17 August 2014	–	1R	Bye			
Western & Southern Open; Cincinnati, United States; ATP World Tour Masters 1000; Hard, outdoor 11–17 August 2014	1192	2R	(Canada) Vasek Pospisil	46	Win	7–6^{(7–4)}, 5–7, 6–2
Western & Southern Open; Cincinnati, United States; ATP World Tour Masters 1000; Hard, outdoor 11–17 August 2014	1193	3R	(France) Gaël Monfils	22	Win	6–4, 4–6, 6–3
Western & Southern Open; Cincinnati, United States; ATP World Tour Masters 1000; Hard, outdoor 11–17 August 2014	1194	QF	(United Kingdom) Andy Murray	9	Win	6–3, 7–5
Western & Southern Open; Cincinnati, United States; ATP World Tour Masters 1000; Hard, outdoor 11–17 August 2014	1195	SF	(Canada) Milos Raonic	7	Win	6–2, 6–3
Western & Southern Open; Cincinnati, United States; ATP World Tour Masters 1000; Hard, outdoor 11–17 August 2014	1196	W	(Spain) David Ferrer	6	Win (3)	6–3, 1–6, 6–2
US Open; New York City, United States; Grand Slam; Hard, outdoor 25 August – 8 September 2014	1197	1R	(Australia) Marinko Matosevic	76	Win	6–3, 6–4, 7–6^{(7–4)}
US Open; New York City, United States; Grand Slam; Hard, outdoor 25 August – 8 September 2014	1198	2R	(Australia) Sam Groth	104	Win	6–4, 6–4, 6–4
US Open; New York City, United States; Grand Slam; Hard, outdoor 25 August – 8 September 2014	1199	3R	(Spain) Marcel Granollers	42	Win	4–6, 6–1, 6–1, 6–1
US Open; New York City, United States; Grand Slam; Hard, outdoor 25 August – 8 September 2014	1200	4R	(Spain) Roberto Bautista Agut	19	Win	6–4, 6–3, 6–2
US Open; New York City, United States; Grand Slam; Hard, outdoor 25 August – 8 September 2014	1201	QF	(France) Gaël Monfils	24	Win	4–6, 3–6, 6–4, 7–5, 6–2
US Open; New York City, United States; Grand Slam; Hard, outdoor 25 August – 8 September 2014	1202	SF	(Croatia) Marin Čilić	16	Loss	3–6, 4–6, 4–6
Davis Cup, World Group Semifinals; Geneva, Switzerland; Davis Cup; Hard, indoor 12–14 September 2014	1203	RR	(Italy) Simone Bolelli	76	Win	7–6^{(7–5)}, 6–4, 6–4
Davis Cup, World Group Semifinals; Geneva, Switzerland; Davis Cup; Hard, indoor 12–14 September 2014	1204	RR	(Italy) Fabio Fognini	17	Win	6–2, 6–3, 7–6^{(7–4)}
Shanghai Rolex Masters; Shanghai, China; ATP World Tour Masters 1000; Hard, outdoor 6–12 October 2014	–	1R	Bye			
Shanghai Rolex Masters; Shanghai, China; ATP World Tour Masters 1000; Hard, outdoor 6–12 October 2014	1205	2R	(Argentina) Leonardo Mayer	25	Win	7–5, 3–6, 7–6^{(9–7)}
Shanghai Rolex Masters; Shanghai, China; ATP World Tour Masters 1000; Hard, outdoor 6–12 October 2014	1206	3R	(Spain) Roberto Bautista Agut	18	Win	6–4, 6–2
Shanghai Rolex Masters; Shanghai, China; ATP World Tour Masters 1000; Hard, outdoor 6–12 October 2014	1207	QF	(France) Julien Benneteau	28	Win	7–6^{(7–4)}, 6–0
Shanghai Rolex Masters; Shanghai, China; ATP World Tour Masters 1000; Hard, outdoor 6–12 October 2014	1208	SF	(Serbia) Novak Djokovic	1	Win	6–4, 6–4
Shanghai Rolex Masters; Shanghai, China; ATP World Tour Masters 1000; Hard, outdoor 6–12 October 2014	1209	W	(France) Gilles Simon	29	Win (4)	7–6^{(8–6)}, 7–6^{(7–2)}
Swiss Indoors Basel; Basel, Switzerland; ATP World Tour 500; Hard, indoor 20–26 October 2014	1210	1R	(Luxembourg) Gilles Müller	53	Win	6–2, 6–1
Swiss Indoors Basel; Basel, Switzerland; ATP World Tour 500; Hard, indoor 20–26 October 2014	1211	2R	(Uzbekistan) Denis Istomin	55	Win	3–6, 6–3, 6–4
Swiss Indoors Basel; Basel, Switzerland; ATP World Tour 500; Hard, indoor 20–26 October 2014	1212	QF	(Bulgaria) Grigor Dimitrov	11	Win	7–6^{(7–4)}, 6–2
Swiss Indoors Basel; Basel, Switzerland; ATP World Tour 500; Hard, indoor 20–26 October 2014	1213	SF	(Croatia) Ivo Karlović	31	Win	7–6^{(10–8)}, 3–6, 6–3
Swiss Indoors Basel; Basel, Switzerland; ATP World Tour 500; Hard, indoor 20–26 October 2014	1214	W	(Belgium) David Goffin	28	Win (5)	6–2, 6–2
BNP Paribas Masters; Paris, France; ATP World Tour Masters 1000; Hard, indoor 27 October – 2 November 2014	–	1R	Bye			
BNP Paribas Masters; Paris, France; ATP World Tour Masters 1000; Hard, indoor 27 October – 2 November 2014	1215	2R	(France) Jérémy Chardy	30	Win	7–6^{(7–5)}, 6–7^{(5–7)}, 6–4
BNP Paribas Masters; Paris, France; ATP World Tour Masters 1000; Hard, indoor 27 October – 2 November 2014	1216	3R	(France) Lucas Pouille	176	Win	6–4, 6–4
BNP Paribas Masters; Paris, France; ATP World Tour Masters 1000; Hard, indoor 27 October – 2 November 2014	1217	QF	(Canada) Milos Raonic	10	Loss	6–7^{(5–7)}, 5–7
ATP World Tour Finals; London, England; ATP World Tour Finals; Hard, indoor 9–16 November 2014	1218	RR	(Canada) Milos Raonic	8	Win	6–1, 7–6^{(7–0)}
ATP World Tour Finals; London, England; ATP World Tour Finals; Hard, indoor 9–16 November 2014	1219	RR	(Japan) Kei Nishikori	5	Win	6–3, 6–2
ATP World Tour Finals; London, England; ATP World Tour Finals; Hard, indoor 9–16 November 2014	1220	RR	(United Kingdom) Andy Murray	6	Win	6–0, 6–1
ATP World Tour Finals; London, England; ATP World Tour Finals; Hard, indoor 9–16 November 2014	1221	SF	(Switzerland) Stan Wawrinka	4	Win	4–6, 7–5, 7–6^{(8–6)}
ATP World Tour Finals; London, England; ATP World Tour Finals; Hard, indoor 9–16 November 2014	–	F	(Serbia) Novak Djokovic	1	Withdrew	N/A
Davis Cup, World Group Final; Lille, France; Davis Cup; Clay, indoor 21–23 November 2014	1222	RR	(France) Gaël Monfils	19	Loss	1–6, 4–6, 3–6
Davis Cup, World Group Final; Lille, France; Davis Cup; Clay, indoor 21–23 November 2014	1223	RR	(France) Richard Gasquet	26	Win	6–4, 6–2, 6–2

=== Doubles matches ===
Tournament	Match	Round	Partner	Opponents	Rank	Result	Score
Brisbane International; Brisbane, Australia; ATP World Tour 250; Hard, outdoor 30 December 2013 – 5 January 2014	204	1R	(France) Nicolas Mahut	(Netherlands) Jean-Julien Rojer (Romania) Horia Tecău	15; 23	Win	7–5, 7–6^{(7–5)}
Brisbane International; Brisbane, Australia; ATP World Tour 250; Hard, outdoor 30 December 2013 – 5 January 2014	205	QF	(France) Nicolas Mahut	(France) Jérémy Chardy (Bulgaria) Grigor Dimitrov	92; 67	Win	7–6^{(7–3)}, 6–7^{(5–7)}, [11–9]
Brisbane International; Brisbane, Australia; ATP World Tour 250; Hard, outdoor 30 December 2013 – 5 January 2014	206	SF	(France) Nicolas Mahut	(Colombia) Juan Sebastián Cabal (Colombia) Robert Farah Maksoud	43; 48	Loss	6–7^{(5–7)}, 3–6
BNP Paribas Open; Indian Wells, United States; ATP World Tour Masters 1000; Hard, outdoor 3–16 March 2014	207	1R	(Switzerland) Stanislas Wawrinka	(India) Rohan Bopanna (Pakistan) Aisam-ul-Haq Qureshi	12; 14	Win	6–2, 6–7^{(4–7)}, [10–6]
BNP Paribas Open; Indian Wells, United States; ATP World Tour Masters 1000; Hard, outdoor 3–16 March 2014	208	2R	(Switzerland) Stanislas Wawrinka	(Latvia) Ernests Gulbis (Canada) Milos Raonic	807; 137	Win	7–6^{(7–3)}, 7–6^{(7–4)}
BNP Paribas Open; Indian Wells, United States; ATP World Tour Masters 1000; Hard, outdoor 3–16 March 2014	209	QF	(Switzerland) Stanislas Wawrinka	(India) Leander Paes (Czech Republic) Radek Štěpánek	10; 8	Win	6–3, 6–7^{(6–8)}, [10–4]
BNP Paribas Open; Indian Wells, United States; ATP World Tour Masters 1000; Hard, outdoor 3–16 March 2014	210	SF	(Switzerland) Stanislas Wawrinka	(Austria) Alexander Peya (Brazil) Bruno Soares	3; 3	Loss	4–6, 1–6
Davis Cup, World Group Quarterfinals; Geneva, Switzerland; Davis Cup; Hard, indoor 4–6 April 2014	211	RR	(Switzerland) Stan Wawrinka	(Kazakhstan) Andrey Golubev (Kazakhstan) Aleksandr Nedovyesov	161; 126	Loss	4–6, 6–7^{(5–7)}, 6–4, 6–7^{(6–8)}
Gerry Weber Open; Halle, Germany; ATP World Tour 250; Grass, outdoor 9–15 June 2014	–	1R	(Switzerland) Marco Chiudinelli	(Germany) Martin Emmrich (Italy) Andreas Seppi	50; 58	Walkover	N/A
Gerry Weber Open; Halle, Germany; ATP World Tour 250; Grass, outdoor 9–15 June 2014	212	QF	(Switzerland) Marco Chiudinelli	(Colombia) Alejandro Falla (Colombia) Santiago Giraldo	554; 306	Win	6–3, 6–3
Gerry Weber Open; Halle, Germany; ATP World Tour 250; Grass, outdoor 9–15 June 2014	213	SF	(Switzerland) Marco Chiudinelli	(Germany) Dustin Brown (Germany) Jan-Lennard Struff	109; 443	Win	7–5, 6–3
Gerry Weber Open; Halle, Germany; ATP World Tour 250; Grass, outdoor 9–15 June 2014	214	F	(Switzerland) Marco Chiudinelli	(Germany) Andre Begemann (Austria) Julian Knowle	49; 42	Loss (1)	6–1, 5–7, [10–12]
Davis Cup, World Group Final; Lille, France; Davis Cup; Clay, indoor 21–23 November 2014	215	RR	(Switzerland) Stan Wawrinka	(France) Julien Benneteau (France) Richard Gasquet	5; 189	Win	6–3, 7–5, 6–4

== Tournament schedule ==
=== Singles schedule ===
Federer's 2014 singles tournament schedule is as follows:

Date	Championship	Location	Category	Surface	Prev. result	Prev. points	New points	Outcome
30 December 2013– 5 January 2014	Brisbane International	Brisbane (AUS)	250 Series	Hard	A	N/A	150	Final (lost to Lleyton Hewitt, 1–6, 6–4, 3–6)
13 January 2014– 26 January 2014	Australian Open	Melbourne (AUS)	Grand Slam	Hard	SF	720	720	Semifinals (lost to Rafael Nadal, 6–7^{(4–7)}, 3–6, 3–6)
31 January 2014– 2 February 2014	Davis Cup World Group, 1R: Serbia vs. Switzerland	Novi Sad (SRB)	Davis Cup	Hard (i)	A	N/A	40	Switzerland def. Serbia, 3–2; Switzerland advanced to WG QF
24 February 2014– 2 March 2014	Dubai Tennis Championships	Dubai (UAE)	500 Series	Hard	SF	180	500	Champion (defeated Tomáš Berdych, 3–6, 6–4, 6–3)
3 March 2014– 16 March 2014	Indian Wells Masters	Indian Wells (USA)	Masters 1000	Hard	QF	180	600	Final (lost to Novak Djokovic, 6–3, 3–6, 6–7^{(3–7)})
17 March 2014– 30 March 2014	Miami Masters	Miami (USA)	Masters 1000	Hard	A	0	180	Quarterfinals (lost to Kei Nishikori, 6–3, 5–7, 4–6)
4 April 2014– 6 April 2014	Davis Cup World Group, QF: Switzerland vs. Kazakhstan	Geneva (SUI)	Davis Cup	Hard (i)	N/A	N/A	130	Switzerland def. Kazakhstan, 3–2; Switzerland advanced to WG SF
12 April 2014– 20 April 2014	Monte-Carlo Masters	Monte Carlo (MON)	Masters 1000	Clay	A	N/A	600	Final (lost to Stanislas Wawrinka, 6–4, 6–7^{(5–7)}, 2–6)
12 May 2014– 18 May 2014	Italian Open	Rome (ITA)	Masters 1000	Clay	F	600	10	Second round (lost to Jérémy Chardy, 6–1, 3–6, 6–7^{(6–8)})
26 May 2014– 8 June 2014	French Open	Paris (FRA)	Grand Slam	Clay	QF	360	180	Fourth round (lost to Ernests Gulbis, 7–6^{(7–5)}, 6–7^{(3–7)}, 2–6, 6–4, 3–6)
9 June 2014– 15 June 2014	Halle Open	Halle (GER)	250 Series	Grass	W	250	250	Champion (defeated Alejandro Falla, 7–6^{(7–2)}, 7–6^{(7–3)})
23 June 2014– 6 July 2014	The Championships, Wimbledon	Wimbledon (GBR)	Grand Slam	Grass	2R	45	1200	Final (lost to Novak Djokovic, 7–6^{(9–7)}, 4–6, 6–7^{(4–7)}, 7–5, 4–6)
4 August 2014– 10 August 2014	Canadian Open	Toronto (CAN)	Masters 1000	Hard	A	0	600	Final (lost to Jo-Wilfried Tsonga, 5–7, 6–7^{(3–7)})
11 August 2014– 17 August 2014	Cincinnati Masters	Cincinnati (USA)	Masters 1000	Hard	QF	180	1000	Champion (defeated David Ferrer, 6–3, 1–6, 6–2)
25 August 2014– 7 September 2014	US Open	New York (USA)	Grand Slam	Hard	4R	180	720	Semifinals (lost to Marin Čilić, 3–6, 4–6, 4–6)
12 September 2014– 14 September 2014	Davis Cup World Group, SF: Switzerland vs. Italy	Geneva (SUI)	Davis Cup	Hard (i)	N/A	N/A	140	Switzerland def. Italy, 3–2; Switzerland advanced to WG Final
6 October 2014– 12 October 2014	Shanghai Masters	Shanghai (CHN)	Masters 1000	Hard	3R	90	1000	Champion (defeated Gilles Simon, 7–6^{(8–6)}, 7–6^{(7–2)})
20 October 2014– 26 October 2014	Swiss Indoors	Basel (SUI)	500 Series	Hard (i)	F	300	500	Champion (defeated David Goffin, 6–2, 6–2)
27 October 2014– 2 November 2014	Paris Masters	Paris (FRA)	Masters 1000	Hard (i)	SF	360	180	Quarterfinals (lost to Milos Raonic, 6–7^{(5–7)}, 5–7)
10 November 2014– 16 November 2014	ATP World Tour Finals	London (GBR)	Tour Finals	Hard (i)	SF	400	1000	Final (withdrew before match against Novak Djokovic)
21 November 2014– 23 November 2014	Davis Cup World Group, Final: France vs. Switzerland	Lille (FRA)	Davis Cup	Clay (i)	N/A	N/A	75	Switzerland def. France, 3–1; Switzerland wins 1st Davis Cup
Total year-end points						4205	9775	▲5570 difference

- Note – for the purposes of year end totals, the four Majors and eight ATP 1000 events must be counted. Then the next six best results will be added, seven if a player makes the Year End Championships. Any other results are not counted in the final tally.

=== Doubles schedule ===
Date	Championship	Location	Category	Surface	Prev. result	Prev. points	New points	Outcome
30 December 2013– 5 January 2014	Brisbane International	Brisbane (AUS)	ATP World Tour 250	Hard	A	N/A	90	Semifinals (lost to Cabal/Farah, 6–7^{(5–7)}, 3–6)
3 March 2014– 16 March 2014	Indian Wells Masters	Indian Wells (USA)	ATP World Tour Masters 1000	Hard	DNP	N/A	360	Semifinals (lost to Peya/Soares, 4–6, 1–6)
4 April 2014– 6 April 2014	Davis Cup World Group, QF: Switzerland vs. Kazakhstan	Geneva (SUI)	Davis Cup	Hard (i)	N/A	N/A	0	Switzerland def. Kazakhstan, 3–2; Switzerland advanced to WG SF
9 June 2014– 15 June 2014	Halle Open	Halle (GER)	ATP World Tour 250	Grass	1R	0	150	Final (lost to Begemann/Knowle, 6–1, 5–7, [10–12])
21 November 2014– 23 November 2014	Davis Cup World Group, Final: France vs. Switzerland	Lille (FRA)	Davis Cup	Clay (i)	N/A	N/A	90	Switzerland def. France, 3–1; Switzerland wins 1st Davis Cup
Total year-end points						90	690	▲600 difference

== Yearly records ==
=== Head-to-head matchups ===
Roger Federer had a 73–12 match win–loss record in the 2014 season. His record against players who were part of the ATP rankings Top Ten at the time of their meetings was 17–5. The following list is ordered by number of wins:

- (United Kingdom) Andy Murray 3–0
- (Canada) Milos Raonic 3–1
- (Serbia) Novak Djokovic 3–2
- (Spain) Roberto Bautista Agut 2–0
- (Spain) David Ferrer 2–0
- (France) Richard Gasquet 2–0
- (Croatia) Ivo Karlović 2–0
- (Australia) Marinko Matosevic 2–0
- (Luxembourg) Gilles Müller 2–0
- (Czech Republic) Lukáš Rosol 2–0
- (Czech Republic) Radek Štěpánek 2–0
- (Russia) Dmitry Tursunov 2–0
- (France) Jérémy Chardy 2–1
- (France) Gaël Monfils 2–1
- (Japan) Kei Nishikori 2–1
- (France) Jo-Wilfried Tsonga 2–1
- (Switzerland) Stanislas Wawrinka 2–1
- (South Africa) Kevin Anderson 1–0
- (Netherlands) Thiemo de Bakker 1–0
- (Germany) Benjamin Becker 1–0
- (France) Julien Benneteau 1–0
- (Czech Republic) Tomáš Berdych 1–0
- (Italy) Simone Bolelli 1–0
- (Serbia) Ilija Bozoljac 1–0
- (Bulgaria) Grigor Dimitrov 1–0
- (Ukraine) Alexandr Dolgopolov 1–0
- (Australia) James Duckworth 1–0
- (Colombia) Alejandro Falla 1–0
- (Italy) Fabio Fognini 1–0
- (Russia) Teymuraz Gabashvili 1–0
- (Colombia) Santiago Giraldo 1–0
- (Belgium) David Goffin 1–0
- (Kazakhstan) Andrey Golubev 1–0
- (Spain) Marcel Granollers 1–0
- (Australia) Sam Groth 1–0
- (Germany) Tommy Haas 1–0
- (Uzbekistan) Denis Istomin 1–0
- (Slovenia) Blaž Kavčič 1–0
- (Kazakhstan) Mikhail Kukushkin 1–0
- (Slovakia) Lukáš Lacko 1–0
- (Spain) Feliciano López 1–0
- (Italy) Paolo Lorenzi 1–0
- (France) Paul-Henri Mathieu 1–0
- (Argentina) Leonardo Mayer 1–0
- (Finland) Jarkko Nieminen 1–0
- (Canada) Peter Polansky 1–0
- (Canada) Vasek Pospisil 1–0
- (France) Lucas Pouille 1–0
- (Spain) Tommy Robredo 1–0
- (Argentina) Diego Sebastián Schwartzman 1–0
- (France) Gilles Simon 1–0
- (Portugal) João Sousa 1–0
- (Croatia) Marin Čilić 1–1
- (Latvia) Ernests Gulbis 0–1
- (Australia) Lleyton Hewitt 0–1
- (Spain) Rafael Nadal 0–1

=== Finals ===
==== Singles: 11 (5 titles, 6 runners-up) ====
Category Grand Slam (0–1) ATP World Tour Finals (0–1) ATP World Tour Masters 1000 (2–3) ATP World Tour 500 (2–0) ATP World Tour 250 (1–1)	Finals by surface Hard (4–4) Clay (0–1) Grass (1–1)	Finals by setting Outdoors (4–5) Indoors (1–1)

Result	No.	Date	Category	Tournament	Surface	Opponent	Score
Runner-up	37.	5 January 2014	250 Series	Brisbane International, Australia	Hard	(Australia) Lleyton Hewitt	1–6, 6–4, 3–6
Winner	78.	1 March 2014	500 Series	Dubai Tennis Championships, UAE (6)	Hard	(Czech Republic) Tomáš Berdych	3–6, 6–4, 6–3
Runner-up	38.	16 March 2014	Masters 1000	Indian Wells Masters, United States	Hard	(Serbia) Novak Djokovic	6–3, 3–6, 6–7^{(3–7)}
Runner-up	39.	20 April 2014	Masters 1000	Monte-Carlo Masters, France	Clay	(Switzerland) Stanislas Wawrinka	6–4, 6–7^{(5–7)}, 2–6
Winner	79.	15 June 2014	250 Series	Halle Open, Germany (7)	Grass	(Colombia) Alejandro Falla	7–6^{(7–2)}, 7–6^{(7–3)}
Runner-up	40.	6 July 2014	Grand Slam	Wimbledon Championships, England	Grass	(Serbia) Novak Djokovic	7–6^{(9–7)}, 4–6, 6–7^{(4–7)}, 7–5, 4–6
Runner-up	41.	10 August 2014	Masters 1000	Canadian Open, Canada	Hard	(France) Jo-Wilfried Tsonga	5–7, 6–7^{(3–7)}
Winner	80.	17 August 2014	Masters 1000	Cincinnati Masters, United States (6)	Hard	(Spain) David Ferrer	6–3, 1–6, 6–2
Winner	81.	12 October 2014	Masters 1000	Shanghai Masters, China	Hard	(France) Gilles Simon	7–6^{(8–6)}, 7–6^{(7–2)}
Winner	82.	26 October 2014	500 Series	Swiss Indoors, Switzerland (6)	Hard (i)	(Belgium) David Goffin	6–2, 6–2
Runner-up	42.	16 November 2014	Tour Finals	ATP World Tour Finals, England	Hard (i)	(Serbia) Novak Djokovic	Withdrew before match

==== Doubles: 1 (1 runner-up) ====
Category ATP World Tour 250 (0–1)	Finals by surface Grass (0–1)	Finals by setting Outdoors (0–1)

Result	No.	Date	Category	Tournament	Surface	Partner	Opponents	Score
Runner-up	6.	15 June 2014	250 Series	Halle Open, Germany	Grass	(Switzerland) Marco Chiudinelli	(Germany) Andre Begemann (Austria) Julian Knowle	6–1, 5–7, [10–12]

==== Team competitions: 1 (1 title) ====
Result	No.	Date	Tournament	Surface	Partners	Opponents	Score
Winner	2.	21–23 November 2014	Davis Cup, Lille, France	Clay (i)	(Switzerland) Stan Wawrinka (Switzerland) Marco Chiudinelli (Switzerland) Michael Lammer	(France) Jo-Wilfried Tsonga (France) Gaël Monfils (France) Julien Benneteau (France) Richard Gasquet	3–1

=== Earnings ===
Event	Prize money	Year-to-date
Brisbane International	$46,760	$46,760
Australian Open	A$540,000	$532,382
Dubai Tennis Championships	$465,830	$998,212
Indian Wells Masters	$531,550	$1,529,762
Miami Masters	$98,130	$1,627,892
Monte-Carlo Masters	€269,150	$2,001,552
Italian Open	€18,860	$2,027,498
French Open	€125,000	$2,197,798
Halle Open	€139,150	$2,387,584
Wimbledon Championships	£880,000	$3,884,288
Canadian Open	$293,650	$4,177,938
Cincinnati Masters	$638,850	$4,816,788
US Open	$792,500	$5,609,288
Shanghai Masters	$798,540	$6,407,828
Swiss Indoors	€352,355	$6,857,292
Paris Masters	€71,700	$6,948,122
ATP World Tour Finals	$1,095,000	$8,043,122
Bonus Pool	$1,350,000	$9,393,122
		$9,393,122

Figures in United States dollars (USD) unless noted.

=== Awards ===
- US Open Sportsmanship Award
- Stefan Edberg Sportsmanship Award
  - Record tenth award in career (fourth consecutive)
- ATPWorldTour.com Fans' Favourite
  - Record twelfth consecutive award in career
- Davis Cup Most Valuable Player (shared with Stan Wawrinka)

== See also ==
- 2014 ATP World Tour
- 2014 Novak Djokovic tennis season
- 2014 Andy Murray tennis season
- 2014 Rafael Nadal tennis season
- 2014 Stanislas Wawrinka tennis season
