= 2014 Novak Djokovic tennis season =

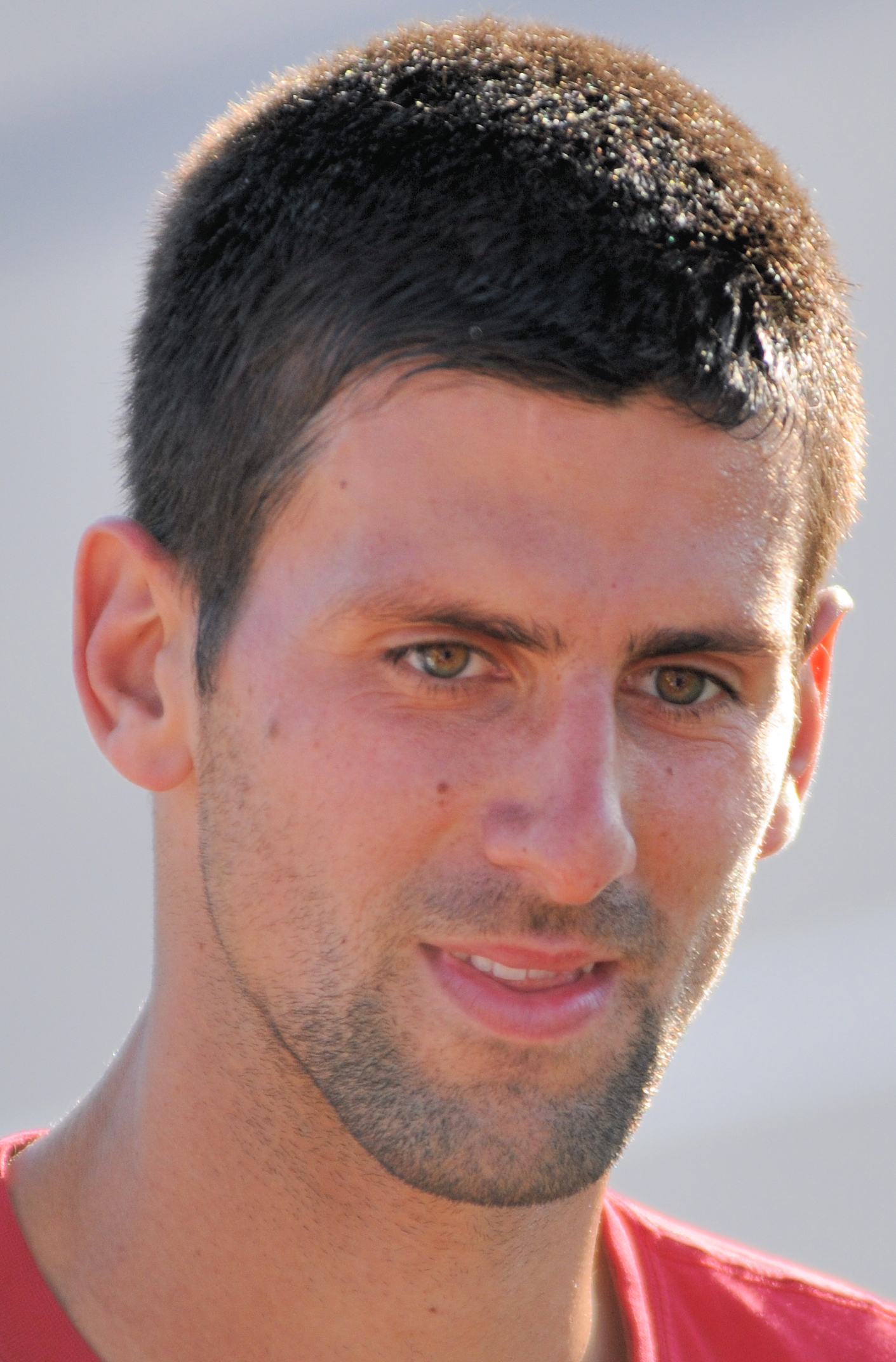
- a close up of Djokovic in Indian Wells.
- Full name: Novak Djokovic
- Country: Serbia
- Calendar prize money: $14,269,463 (singles & doubles)

Singles
- Season record: 61–8
- Calendar titles: 7
- Year-end ranking: No. 1
- Ranking change from previous year: ▲1

Grand Slam & significant results
- Australian Open: QF
- French Open: F
- Wimbledon: W
- US Open: SF
- Other tournaments
- Tour Finals: W

Doubles
- Current ranking: 573
- Ranking change from previous year: ▼1

Injuries
- Injuries: Arm injury during Monte-Carlo Rolex Masters

The 2014 Novak Djokovic tennis season began on 30 December 2013 with the start of the 2014 ATP World Tour.

== Yearly summary ==
Djokovic began the year with a warmup tournament win at the World Tennis Championship. At the Australian Open, he won against Lukáš Lacko in straight sets for the first round, won against Leonardo Mayer in straight sets, winning the first set with a bagel, and won against Denis Istomin in straight sets too. He continued his straight sets streak beating no.15 seed Fabio Fognini. Djokovic then met eventual champion Stanislas Wawrinka in the quarterfinals of the tournament, who defeated Djokovic in five sets, ending his 25 match winning streak at the Australian Open.

Djokovic chose to withdraw from the first round of the Davis Cup and returned in late February attempting to defend his Dubai title, however he reached the semi-finals falling to eventual champion Roger Federer.

In March he returned to Indian Wells and Miami, winning both tournaments, in the first he avenged Federer in three sets and in the latter he defeated Rafael Nadal in straight sets, in their 40th match.

Djokovic played in the Monte-Carlo Masters, losing to Federer in the semifinals. This ended an unbeaten run in the Masters 1000 tournaments, starting with Shanghai in 2013, during which he won four consecutive Masters 1000 tournaments: (Shanghai, Paris, Indian Wells, and Miami). On 4 May, withdrew from ATP World Tour Masters 1000 Madrid having suffered a recurrence of the right arm injury that afflicted him at ATP World Tour Masters 1000 Monte-Carlo...

On 18 May, he defeated Nadal in Rome, it was his 19th ATP World Tour Masters 1000 trophy and he has now won five of the past seven titles at this tournament level; now tied at No. 13 with Muster in the Open Era titles leader list, with 44 crowns...

On 8 June, failed in his bid to win a first Roland Garros title, regain No. 1 in the Emirates ATP Rankings for the first time since 6 October 2014 and also complete a career Grand Slam (he would be the eighth man in tennis history)...Finished runner-up for a second time (also 2012), losing to Nadal in four sets...

Wins seventh Grand Slam championship and second Wimbledon crown (also 2011), beating No. 4 seed Federer in five sets in the final.

Lost prior to ATP World Tour Masters 1000 Toronto QFs for first time, when he saw his 11-match winning streak against Tsonga end...Saw his hopes of completing a Career Golden Masters end at the hands of Robredo in the ATP World Tour Masters 1000 Cincinnati 4R...

Dropped one set en route to reaching his eighth straight US Open SF (l. to Nishikori)...It was his 17th major SF in his past 18 Grand Slam championships...Beat seeds Kohlschreiber (4R) and Murray (QFs)...

On 5 October, improves to 24-0 in Beijing with fifth title (d. Berdych 60 62 in final)...Did not drop a set all week to win 46th career title...

On 11 October, saw his 28-match winning streak on Chinese soil come to an end in ATP World Tour Masters 1000 Shanghai SFs (l. to Federer)...

On 2 November, became the fifth active player (23rd in Open Era) to record 600 match wins as he captured his 20th ATP World Tour Masters 1000 title (d. Raonic) in Paris (his third trophy at the tournament, also 2009, 2013)...

On 16 November won the Barclays ATP World Tour Finals for the third straight year – and fourth time overall (also 2008)...He is the third player to win three straight year-end titles, after Ilie Nastase (1971–73) and Ivan Lendl (1985-87)...Went undefeated 4-0, but did not contest final due to Federer's back injury...Finished 2014 with a 61-8 match record, including seven titles and $14,250,527 in prize money

== All matches ==
This table lists all the matches of Djokovic this year, including walkovers W/O (they are marked ND for non-decision)

Key
W	F	SF	QF	#R	RR	Q#	P#	DNQ	A	Z#	PO	G	S	B	NMS	NTI	P	NH

(W) winner; (F) finalist; (SF) semifinalist; (QF) quarterfinalist; (#R) rounds 4, 3, 2, 1; (RR) round-robin stage; (Q#) qualification round; (P#) preliminary round; (DNQ) did not qualify; (A) absent; (Z#) Davis/Fed Cup Zonal Group (with number indication) or (PO) play-off; (G) gold, (S) silver or (B) bronze Olympic/Paralympic medal; (NMS) not a Masters tournament; (NTI) not a Tier I tournament; (P) postponed; (NH) not held; (SR) strike rate (events won / competed); (W–L) win–loss record.
To avoid confusion and double counting, these charts are updated at the conclusion of a tournament or when the player's participation has ended.

=== Singles matches ===
Tournament	Match	Round	Opponent (seed or key)	Rank	Result	Score
Australian Open; Melbourne, Australia; Grand Slam tournament Hard, outdoor 13 – 26 January 2014
Australian Open; Melbourne, Australia; Grand Slam tournament Hard, outdoor 13 – 26 January 2014	1 / 676	1R	(Slovakia) Lukáš Lacko	96	Win	6–3, 7–6^{(7–2)}, 6–1
Australian Open; Melbourne, Australia; Grand Slam tournament Hard, outdoor 13 – 26 January 2014	2 / 677	2R	(Argentina) Leonardo Mayer	98	Win	6–0, 6–4, 6–4
Australian Open; Melbourne, Australia; Grand Slam tournament Hard, outdoor 13 – 26 January 2014	3 / 678	3R	(Uzbekistan) Denis Istomin	49	Win	6–3, 6–3, 7–5
Australian Open; Melbourne, Australia; Grand Slam tournament Hard, outdoor 13 – 26 January 2014	4 / 679	4R	(Italy) Fabio Fognini (15)	16	Win	6–3, 6–0, 6–2
Australian Open; Melbourne, Australia; Grand Slam tournament Hard, outdoor 13 – 26 January 2014	5 / 680	QF	(Switzerland) Stan Wawrinka (8)	8	Loss	6–2, 4–6, 2–6, 6–3, 7–9
Dubai Tennis Championships; Dubai, United Arab Emirates; ATP 500; Hard, outdoor 24 February – 1 March 2014
Dubai Tennis Championships; Dubai, United Arab Emirates; ATP 500; Hard, outdoor 24 February – 1 March 2014	6 / 681	1R	(Uzbekistan) Denis Istomin	54	Win	6–3, 6–3
Dubai Tennis Championships; Dubai, United Arab Emirates; ATP 500; Hard, outdoor 24 February – 1 March 2014	7 / 682	2R	(Spain) Roberto Bautista Agut	51	Win	6–1, 6–3
Dubai Tennis Championships; Dubai, United Arab Emirates; ATP 500; Hard, outdoor 24 February – 1 March 2014	–	QF	(Russia) Mikhail Youzhny (6)	15	W/O	N/A
Dubai Tennis Championships; Dubai, United Arab Emirates; ATP 500; Hard, outdoor 24 February – 1 March 2014	8 / 683	SF	(Switzerland) Roger Federer (4)	8	Loss	6–3, 3–6, 2–6
BNP Paribas Open; Indian Wells, United States; ATP 1000; Hard, outdoor 3 – 16 March 2014
BNP Paribas Open; Indian Wells, United States; ATP 1000; Hard, outdoor 3 – 16 March 2014	–	1R	Bye			
BNP Paribas Open; Indian Wells, United States; ATP 1000; Hard, outdoor 3 – 16 March 2014	9 / 684	2R	(Romania) Victor Hănescu	54	Win	7–6, 6–2
BNP Paribas Open; Indian Wells, United States; ATP 1000; Hard, outdoor 3 – 16 March 2014	10 / 685	3R	(Colombia) Alejandro González	78	Win	6–1, 3–6, 6–1
BNP Paribas Open; Indian Wells, United States; ATP 1000; Hard, outdoor 3 – 16 March 2014	11 / 686	4R	(Croatia) Marin Čilić (24)	25	Win	1–6, 6–2, 6–3
BNP Paribas Open; Indian Wells, United States; ATP 1000; Hard, outdoor 3 – 16 March 2014	12 / 687	QF	(France) Julien Benneteau	67	Win	6–1, 6–3
BNP Paribas Open; Indian Wells, United States; ATP 1000; Hard, outdoor 3 – 16 March 2014	13 / 688	SF	(United States) John Isner (12)	13	Win	7–5, 6–7^{(2–7)}, 6–1
BNP Paribas Open; Indian Wells, United States; ATP 1000; Hard, outdoor 3 – 16 March 2014	14 / 689	W	(Switzerland) Roger Federer (7)	8	Win (1)	3–6, 6–3, 7–6^{(7–3)}
Sony Open Tennis; Miami, United States; ATP 1000; Hard, outdoor 17 – 30 March 2014
Sony Open Tennis; Miami, United States; ATP 1000; Hard, outdoor 17 – 30 March 2014	–	1R	Bye			
Sony Open Tennis; Miami, United States; ATP 1000; Hard, outdoor 17 – 30 March 2014	15 / 690	2R	(France) Jérémy Chardy	48	Win	6–4, 6–3
Sony Open Tennis; Miami, United States; ATP 1000; Hard, outdoor 17 – 30 March 2014	–	3R	(Germany) Florian Mayer (30)	32	W/O	N/A
Sony Open Tennis; Miami, United States; ATP 1000; Hard, outdoor 17 – 30 March 2014	16 / 691	4R	(Spain) Tommy Robredo (16)	17	Win	6–3, 7–5
Sony Open Tennis; Miami, United States; ATP 1000; Hard, outdoor 17 – 30 March 2014	17 / 692	QF	(United Kingdom) Andy Murray (6)	6	Win	7–5, 6–3
Sony Open Tennis; Miami, United States; ATP 1000; Hard, outdoor 17 – 30 March 2014	–	SF	(Japan) Kei Nishikori (20)	21	W/O	N/A
Sony Open Tennis; Miami, United States; ATP 1000; Hard, outdoor 17 – 30 March 2014	18 / 693	W	(Spain) Rafael Nadal (1)	1	Win (2)	6–3, 6–3
Monte-Carlo Rolex Masters; Monte Carlo, Monaco; ATP 1000; Clay, outdoor 12 – 20 April 2014
Monte-Carlo Rolex Masters; Monte Carlo, Monaco; ATP 1000; Clay, outdoor 12 – 20 April 2014	–	1R	Bye			
Monte-Carlo Rolex Masters; Monte Carlo, Monaco; ATP 1000; Clay, outdoor 12 – 20 April 2014	19 / 694	2R	(Spain) Albert Montañés (Q)	57	Win	6–1, 6–0
Monte-Carlo Rolex Masters; Monte Carlo, Monaco; ATP 1000; Clay, outdoor 12 – 20 April 2014	20 / 695	3R	(Spain) Pablo Carreño (LL)	62	Win	6–0, 6–1
Monte-Carlo Rolex Masters; Monte Carlo, Monaco; ATP 1000; Clay, outdoor 12 – 20 April 2014	21 / 696	QF	(Spain) Guillermo García-López	38	Win	4–6, 6–3, 6–1
Monte-Carlo Rolex Masters; Monte Carlo, Monaco; ATP 1000; Clay, outdoor 12 – 20 April 2014	22 / 697	SF	(Switzerland) Roger Federer (4/WC)	4	Loss	5–7, 2–6
Internazionali BNL d'Italia; Rome, Italy; ATP 1000; Clay, outdoor 11 – 18 May 2014
Internazionali BNL d'Italia; Rome, Italy; ATP 1000; Clay, outdoor 11 – 18 May 2014	–	1R	Bye			
Internazionali BNL d'Italia; Rome, Italy; ATP 1000; Clay, outdoor 11 – 18 May 2014	23 / 698	2R	(Czech Republic) Radek Štěpánek	41	Win	6–3, 7–5
Internazionali BNL d'Italia; Rome, Italy; ATP 1000; Clay, outdoor 11 – 18 May 2014	24 / 699	3R	(Germany) Philipp Kohlschreiber	29	Win	4–6, 6–2, 6–1
Internazionali BNL d'Italia; Rome, Italy; ATP 1000; Clay, outdoor 11 – 18 May 2014	25 / 700	QF	(Spain) David Ferrer (5)	5	Win	7–5, 4–6, 6–3
Internazionali BNL d'Italia; Rome, Italy; ATP 1000; Clay, outdoor 11 – 18 May 2014	26 / 701	SF	(Canada) Milos Raonic (8)	10	Win	6–7^{(5–7)}, 7–6^{(7–4)}, 6–3
Internazionali BNL d'Italia; Rome, Italy; ATP 1000; Clay, outdoor 11 – 18 May 2014	27 / 702	W	(Spain) Rafael Nadal (1)	1	Win (3)	4–6, 6–3, 6–3
French Open; Paris, France; Grand Slam tournament Clay, outdoor 25 May – 08 June 2014
French Open; Paris, France; Grand Slam tournament Clay, outdoor 25 May – 08 June 2014	28 / 703	1R	(Portugal) Joao Sousa	44	Win	6–1, 6–2, 6–4
French Open; Paris, France; Grand Slam tournament Clay, outdoor 25 May – 08 June 2014	29 / 704	2R	(France) Jérémy Chardy	42	Win	6–1, 6–4, 6–2
French Open; Paris, France; Grand Slam tournament Clay, outdoor 25 May – 08 June 2014	30 / 705	3R	(Croatia) Marin Čilić (25)	26	Win	6–3, 6–2, 6–7^{(2–7)}, 6–4
French Open; Paris, France; Grand Slam tournament Clay, outdoor 25 May – 08 June 2014	31 / 706	4R	(France) Jo-Wilfried Tsonga (13)	14	Win	6–1, 6–4, 6–1
French Open; Paris, France; Grand Slam tournament Clay, outdoor 25 May – 08 June 2014	32 / 707	QF	(Canada) Milos Raonic (8)	9	Win	7–5, 7–6^{(7–5)}, 6–4
French Open; Paris, France; Grand Slam tournament Clay, outdoor 25 May – 08 June 2014	33 / 708	SF	(Latvia) Ernests Gulbis (18)	17	Win	6–3, 6–3, 3–6, 6–3
French Open; Paris, France; Grand Slam tournament Clay, outdoor 25 May – 08 June 2014	34 / 709	F	(Spain) Rafael Nadal (1)	1	Loss (1)	6–3, 5–7, 2–6, 4–6
Wimbledon Championships; London, United Kingdom; Grand Slam tournament Grass, outdoor 23 June – 06 July 2014
Wimbledon Championships; London, United Kingdom; Grand Slam tournament Grass, outdoor 23 June – 06 July 2014	35 / 710	1R	(Kazakhstan) Andrei Golubev	55	Win	6–0, 6–1, 6–4
Wimbledon Championships; London, United Kingdom; Grand Slam tournament Grass, outdoor 23 June – 06 July 2014	36 / 711	2R	(Czech Republic) Radek Štěpánek	38	Win	6–4, 6–3, 6–7^{(5–7)}, 7–6^{(7–5)}
Wimbledon Championships; London, United Kingdom; Grand Slam tournament Grass, outdoor 23 June – 06 July 2014	37 / 712	3R	(France) Gilles Simon	44	Win	6–4, 6–2, 6–4
Wimbledon Championships; London, United Kingdom; Grand Slam tournament Grass, outdoor 23 June – 06 July 2014	38 / 713	4R	(France) Jo-Wilfried Tsonga (14)	17	Win	6–3, 6–4, 7–6^{(7–5)}
Wimbledon Championships; London, United Kingdom; Grand Slam tournament Grass, outdoor 23 June – 06 July 2014	39 / 714	QF	(Croatia) Marin Čilić (26)	29	Win	6–1, 3–6, 6–7^{(4–7)}, 6–2, 6–2
Wimbledon Championships; London, United Kingdom; Grand Slam tournament Grass, outdoor 23 June – 06 July 2014	40 / 715	SF	(Bulgaria) Grigor Dimitrov (11)	13	Win	6–4, 3–6, 7–6^{(7–2)}, 7–6^{(9–7)}
Wimbledon Championships; London, United Kingdom; Grand Slam tournament Grass, outdoor 23 June – 06 July 2014	41 / 716	W	(Switzerland) Roger Federer (4)	4	Win (4)	6–7^{(7–9)}, 6–4, 7–6^{(7–4)}, 5–7, 6–4–-
Rogers Cup; Toronto, Canada; ATP 1000; Hard, outdoor 4 – 10 August 2014
Rogers Cup; Toronto, Canada; ATP 1000; Hard, outdoor 4 – 10 August 2014	–	1R	Bye			
Rogers Cup; Toronto, Canada; ATP 1000; Hard, outdoor 4 – 10 August 2014	42 /717	2R	(France) Gaël Monfils	22	Win	6–2, 6–7^{(4–7)}, 7–6^{(7–2)}
Rogers Cup; Toronto, Canada; ATP 1000; Hard, outdoor 4 – 10 August 2014	43 / 718	3R	(France) Jo-Wilfried Tsonga (13)	15	Loss	2–6, 2–6
Cincinnati Masters; Cincinnati, United States; ATP 1000; Hard, outdoor 11 – 17 August 2014
Cincinnati Masters; Cincinnati, United States; ATP 1000; Hard, outdoor 11 – 17 August 2014	–	1R	Bye			
Cincinnati Masters; Cincinnati, United States; ATP 1000; Hard, outdoor 11 – 17 August 2014	44 / 719	2R	(France) Gilles Simon	31	Win	6–3, 4–6, 6–4
Cincinnati Masters; Cincinnati, United States; ATP 1000; Hard, outdoor 11 – 17 August 2014	45 / 720	3R	(Spain) Tommy Robredo (16)	20	Loss	6–7^{(6–8)}, 5–7
US Open; New York, United States; Grand Slam tournament Hard, outdoor 25 August – 09 September 2014
US Open; New York, United States; Grand Slam tournament Hard, outdoor 25 August – 09 September 2014	46 / 721	1R	(Argentina) Diego Schwartzman	80	Win	6–1, 6–2, 6–4
US Open; New York, United States; Grand Slam tournament Hard, outdoor 25 August – 09 September 2014	47 / 722	2R	(France) Paul-Henri Mathieu	81	Win	6–1, 6–3, 6–0
US Open; New York, United States; Grand Slam tournament Hard, outdoor 25 August – 09 September 2014	48 / 723	3R	(United States) Sam Querrey	57	Win	6–3, 6–2, 6–2
US Open; New York, United States; Grand Slam tournament Hard, outdoor 25 August – 09 September 2014	49 / 724	4R	(Germany) Philipp Kohlschreiber	25	Win	6–1, 7–5, 6–4
US Open; New York, United States; Grand Slam tournament Hard, outdoor 25 August – 09 September 2014	50 / 725	QF	(United Kingdom) Andy Murray	9	Win	7–6^{(7–1)}, 6–7^{(1–7)}, 6–2, 6–4
US Open; New York, United States; Grand Slam tournament Hard, outdoor 25 August – 09 September 2014	51 / 726	SF	(Japan) Kei Nishikori	11	Loss	4–6, 6–1, 6–7^{(4–7)}, 3–6
China Open; Beijing, China; ATP 500; Hard, outdoor 27 September – 5 October 2014
China Open; Beijing, China; ATP 500; Hard, outdoor 27 September – 5 October 2014	52 / 727	1R	(Spain) Guillermo García-López	39	Win	6–2, 6–1
China Open; Beijing, China; ATP 500; Hard, outdoor 27 September – 5 October 2014	53 / 728	2R	(Canada) Vasek Pospisil	44	Win	6–3, 7–5
China Open; Beijing, China; ATP 500; Hard, outdoor 27 September – 5 October 2014	54 / 729	QF	(Bulgaria) Grigor Dimitrov (5)	10	Win	6–2, 6–4
China Open; Beijing, China; ATP 500; Hard, outdoor 27 September – 5 October 2014	55 / 730	SF	(United Kingdom) Andy Murray (6)	11	Win	6–3, 6–4
China Open; Beijing, China; ATP 500; Hard, outdoor 27 September – 5 October 2014	56 / 731	W	(Czech Republic) Tomáš Berdych (3)	7	Win (5)	6–0, 6–2
Shanghai Rolex Masters; Shanghai, China; ATP 1000; Hard, outdoor 5–12 October 2014
Shanghai Rolex Masters; Shanghai, China; ATP 1000; Hard, outdoor 5–12 October 2014	–	1R	Bye			
Shanghai Rolex Masters; Shanghai, China; ATP 1000; Hard, outdoor 5–12 October 2014	57 / 732	2R	(Austria) Dominic Thiem	41	Win	6–3, 6–4
Shanghai Rolex Masters; Shanghai, China; ATP 1000; Hard, outdoor 5–12 October 2014	58 / 733	3R	(Kazakhstan) Mikhail Kukushkin	86	Win	6–3, 4–6, 6–4
Shanghai Rolex Masters; Shanghai, China; ATP 1000; Hard, outdoor 5–12 October 2014	59 / 734	QF	(Spain) David Ferrer (5)	5	Win	6–4, 6–2
Shanghai Rolex Masters; Shanghai, China; ATP 1000; Hard, outdoor 5–12 October 2014	60 / 735	SF	(Switzerland) Roger Federer (3)	3	Loss	4–6, 4–6
BNP Paribas Masters; Paris, France; ATP 1000; Hard, indoor 27 October – 2 November 2014
BNP Paribas Masters; Paris, France; ATP 1000; Hard, indoor 27 October – 2 November 2014	–	1R	Bye			
BNP Paribas Masters; Paris, France; ATP 1000; Hard, indoor 27 October – 2 November 2014	61 / 736	2R	(Germany) Philipp Kohlschreiber	24	Win	6–3, 6–4
BNP Paribas Masters; Paris, France; ATP 1000; Hard, indoor 27 October – 2 November 2014	62 / 737	3R	(France) Gaël Monfils	21	Win	6–3, 7–6^{(7–2)}
BNP Paribas Masters; Paris, France; ATP 1000; Hard, indoor 27 October – 2 November 2014	63 / 738	QF	(United Kingdom) Andy Murray (8)	8	Win	7–5, 6–2
BNP Paribas Masters; Paris, France; ATP 1000; Hard, indoor 27 October – 2 November 2014	64 / 739	SF	(Japan) Kei Nishikori (6)	7	Win	6–2, 6–3
BNP Paribas Masters; Paris, France; ATP 1000; Hard, indoor 27 October – 2 November 2014	65 / 740	W	(Canada) Milos Raonic (7)	10	Win (6)	6–2, 6–3
ATP World Tour Finals; London, United Kingdom; ATP Finals; Hard, indoor 9 – 16 November 2014
ATP World Tour Finals; London, United Kingdom; ATP Finals; Hard, indoor 9 – 16 November 2014	66 / 741	RR	(Croatia) Marin Čilić (8)	9	Win	6–1, 6–1
ATP World Tour Finals; London, United Kingdom; ATP Finals; Hard, indoor 9 – 16 November 2014	67 / 742	RR	(Switzerland) Stan Wawrinka (3)	4	Win	6–3, 6–0
ATP World Tour Finals; London, United Kingdom; ATP Finals; Hard, indoor 9 – 16 November 2014	68 / 743	RR	(Czech Republic) Tomáš Berdych (6)	7	Win	6–2, 6–2
ATP World Tour Finals; London, United Kingdom; ATP Finals; Hard, indoor 9 – 16 November 2014	69 / 744	SF	(Japan) Kei Nishikori (4)	5	Win	6–1, 3–6, 6–0
ATP World Tour Finals; London, United Kingdom; ATP Finals; Hard, indoor 9 – 16 November 2014	–	W	(Switzerland) Roger Federer (2)	2	W/O (7)	N/A

- Source

=== Doubles matches ===
Tournament	Match	Round	Opponents (seed or key)	Ranks	Result	Score
Dubai Tennis Championships; Dubai, United Arab Emirates; ATP 500; Hard, outdoor 24 February – 1 March 2014; Partner: (Spain) Carlos Gomez-Herrera
Dubai Tennis Championships; Dubai, United Arab Emirates; ATP 500; Hard, outdoor 24 February – 1 March 2014; Partner: (Spain) Carlos Gomez-Herrera	1 / 80	1R	(Poland) Tomasz Bednarek / (Czech Republic) Lukáš Dlouhý	#54 / #49	Loss	5–7, 6–1, [5–10]
BNP Paribas Open; Indian Wells, United States; ATP 1000; Hard, outdoor 3 – 16 March 2014; Partner: (Serbia) Filip Krajinović
BNP Paribas Open; Indian Wells, United States; ATP 1000; Hard, outdoor 3 – 16 March 2014; Partner: (Serbia) Filip Krajinović	2 / 81	1R	(Latvia) Ernests Gulbis / (Canada) Milos Raonic	#807 / #137	Loss	6–7^{(3–7)}, 1–6
Rogers Cup; Toronto, Canada; ATP 1000; Hard, outdoor 4 – 10 August 2014; Partner: (Switzerland) Stan Wawrinka
Rogers Cup; Toronto, Canada; ATP 1000; Hard, outdoor 4 – 10 August 2014; Partner: (Switzerland) Stan Wawrinka	3 / 82	1R	(Colombia) Juan Sebastián Cabal / (Spain) David Marrero	#30 / #12	Win	6–3, 7–5
Rogers Cup; Toronto, Canada; ATP 1000; Hard, outdoor 4 – 10 August 2014; Partner: (Switzerland) Stan Wawrinka	4 / 83	2R	(Canada) Daniel Nestor / (Serbia) Nenad Zimonjić (3)	#5 / #7	Loss	4–6, 4–6
China Open; Beijing, China; ATP 500; Hard, outdoor 29 September – 5 October 2014; Partner: (Serbia) Filip Krajinović
China Open; Beijing, China; ATP 500; Hard, outdoor 29 September – 5 October 2014; Partner: (Serbia) Filip Krajinović	–	1R	(Latvia) Ernests Gulbis / (Poland) Marcin Matkowski	#420 / #35	Walkover	N/A
China Open; Beijing, China; ATP 500; Hard, outdoor 29 September – 5 October 2014; Partner: (Serbia) Filip Krajinović	–	QF	(Italy) Fabio Fognini / (Argentina) Leonardo Mayer	#52 / #110	Withdrew	N/A

- Source

=== Exhibitions ===
Tournament	Match	Round	Opponent (Seed or Key)	Rank	Result	Score
Mubadala World Tennis Championship; Abu Dhabi, United Arab Emirates; Exhibition; Hard, outdoor 26 – 28 December 2013
Mubadala World Tennis Championship; Abu Dhabi, United Arab Emirates; Exhibition; Hard, outdoor 26 – 28 December 2013	–	QF	Bye			
Mubadala World Tennis Championship; Abu Dhabi, United Arab Emirates; Exhibition; Hard, outdoor 26 – 28 December 2013	1	SF	(France) Jo-Wilfried Tsonga (6)	10	Win	7–6^{(7–5)}, 6–3
Mubadala World Tennis Championship; Abu Dhabi, United Arab Emirates; Exhibition; Hard, outdoor 26 – 28 December 2013	2	W	(Spain) David Ferrer (3)	3	Win (1)	7–5, 6–2
The Boodles Challenge; Stoke Poges, United Kingdom; Exhibition; Grass, outdoor 17 – 21 June 2014
The Boodles Challenge; Stoke Poges, United Kingdom; Exhibition; Grass, outdoor 17 – 21 June 2014	–	RR	(Netherlands) Robin Haase	51	Withdrew	N/A

== Tournament schedule ==
=== Singles schedule ===
Date	Tournament	City	Category	Surface	2013 result	2013 points	2014 points	Outcome
13.01.2014–26.01.2014	Australian Open	Melbourne	Grand Slam	Hard	W	2000	360	Quarterfinals (lost to Stan Wawrinka, 6–2, 4–6, 2–6, 6–3, 7–9)
31.01.2014–02.02.0214	Davis Cup: Serbia vs Switzerland	Novi Sad	Davis Cup	Hard (i)	F	40	0	First Round: Serbia lost to Switzerland 2–3 (Novak Djokovic did not play)
24.02.2014–02.03.2014	Dubai Tennis Championships	Dubai	ATP World Tour 500	Hard	W	500	180	Semifinals (lost to Roger Federer, 6–3, 3–6, 2–6)
06.03.2014–16.03.2014	Indian Wells Masters	Indian Wells	ATP Masters 1000	Hard	SF	360	1000	Winner (def. Roger Federer, 3–6, 6–3, 7–6^{(7–3)})
19.03.2014–30.03.2014	Miami Masters	Miami	ATP Masters 1000	Hard	4R	90	1000	Winner (def. Rafael Nadal, 6–3, 6–3)
04.04.2014–06.04.2014	Davis Cup: Quarterfinals	–	Davis Cup	–	F	130	0	Quarterfinals: Serbia did not qualify
14.04.2014–20.04.2014	Monte-Carlo Masters	Monaco	ATP Masters 1000	Clay	W	1000	360	Semifinals (lost to Roger Federer, 5–7, 2–6)
05.05.2014–11.05.2014	Madrid Open	Madrid	ATP Masters 1000	Clay	2R	10	0	Withdrew
12.05.2014–18.05.2014	Italian Open	Rome	ATP Masters 1000	Clay	QF	180	1000	Winner (def. Rafael Nadal, 4–6, 6–3, 6–3)
25.05.2014–08.06.2014	French Open	Paris	Grand Slam	Clay	SF	720	1200	Final (lost to Rafael Nadal, 6–3, 5–7, 2–6, 4–6)
23.06.2014–06.07.2014	Wimbledon Championships	Wimbledon	Grand Slam	Grass	F	1200	2000	Winner (def. Roger Federer, 6–7^{(7–9)}, 6–4, 7–6^{(7–4)}, 5–7, 6–4)
04.08.2014–10.08.2014	Canadian Open	Toronto	ATP Masters 1000	Hard	SF	360	90	Third Round (lost to Jo-Wilfried Tsonga, 2–6, 2–6)
11.08.2014–17.08.2014	Cincinnati Masters	Cincinnati	ATP Masters 1000	Hard	QF	180	90	Third Round (lost to Tommy Robredo, 6–7^{(6–8)}, 5–7)
25.08.2014–08.09.2014	US Open	New York City	Grand Slam	Hard	F	1200	720	Semifinals (lost to Kei Nishikori, 4–6, 6–1, 6–7^{(4–7)}, 3–6)
12.09.2014–14.09.2014	Davis Cup: Semifinals	–	Davis Cup	–	F	140	0	Semifinals: Serbia did not qualify
12.09.2014–14.09.2014	Davis Cup: India vs Serbia	Bangalore	Davis Cup	Hard	F	140	0	Play-offs: Serbia def. India, 3–2 (Djokovic withdrew)
29.09.2014–05.10.2014	China Open	Beijing	ATP World Tour 500	Hard	W	500	500	Winner (def. Tomáš Berdych, 6–0, 6–2)
06.10.2014–12.10.2014	Shanghai Masters	Shanghai	ATP Masters 1000	Hard	W	1000	360	Semifinals (lost to Roger Federer, 4–6, 4–6)
27.10.2014–02.11.2014	Paris Masters	Paris	ATP Masters 1000	Hard (i)	W	1000	1000	Winner (def. Milos Raonic, 6–2, 6–3)
10.11.2014–17.11.2014	ATP World Tour Finals	London	ATP World Tour Finals	Hard (i)	W	1500	1500	Winner (Roger Federer, walkover)
21.11.2014–23.11.2014	Davis Cup: Final	–	Davis Cup	–	F	150	0	Final: Serbia did not qualify
Total year-end points						12260	11360	▼900 difference

=== Doubles schedule ===
Date	Tournament	City	Category	Surface	2013 result	2013 points	2014 points	Outcome
24.02.2014–01.03.2014	Dubai Tennis Championships	Dubai	ATP World Tour 500	Hard	1R	(0)	(0)	First round (lost to Bednarek/Dlouhý, 5–7, 6–1, [5–10])
06.03.2014–16.03.2014	Indian Wells Masters	Indian Wells	ATP Masters 1000	Hard	DNS	0	(0)	First round (lost to Gulbis/Raonic, 6-7^{(3–7)}, 1-6)
06.03.2014–16.03.2014	Canadian Open	Toronto	ATP Masters 1000	Hard	DNS	0	90	Second round (lost to Nestor/Zimonjic, 4-6, 4-6)
29.09.2014–05.10.2014	China Open	Beijing	ATP World Tour 500	Hard	SF	90	(0)	Quarterfinals (withdrew against Fognini/Mayer)
Total year-end points						90	90	0 difference

- 2013 source
- 2014 source

== Yearly records ==
=== Head-to-Head matchups ===
Novak Djokovic has a 19–5 record against the top 10, 28–3 against the top 11–50, and 14–0 against other players.
Ordered by number of wins (Bolded number marks a top 10 player at the time of match, Italic means top 50)

- **(United Kingdom) Andy Murray** 4–0
- **(Croatia) Marin Čilić** 4–0
- (Germany) Philipp Kohlschreiber 3–0
- **(Canada) Milos Raonic** 3–0
- (Uzbekistan) Denis Istomin 2–0
- (France) Jérémy Chardy 2–0
- (France) Gilles Simon 2–0
- (Czech Republic) Radek Štěpánek 2–0
- **(Spain) Rafael Nadal** 2–1
- (France) Jo-Wilfried Tsonga 2–1
- **(Switzerland) Roger Federer** 2–3
- **(Spain) David Ferrer** 2–0
- **(Czech Republic) Tomáš Berdych** 2–0
- **(Bulgaria) Grigor Dimitrov** 2–0
- (France) Gaël Monfils 2–0
- **(Japan) Kei Nishikori** 2–1
- (Portugal) Joao Sousa 1–0
- (United States) John Isner 1–0
- (Italy) Fabio Fognini 1–0
- (Latvia) Ernests Gulbis 1–0
- (United States) Sam Querrey 1–0
- (France) Paul-Henri Mathieu 1–0
- (Spain) Guillermo García-López 1–0
- (Colombia) Alejandro González 1–0
- (France) Julien Benneteau 1–0
- (Argentina) Diego Schwartzman 1–0
- (Spain) Roberto Bautista-Agut 1–0
- (Kazakhstan) Andrei Golubev 1–0
- (Spain) Albert Montañés 1–0
- (Romania) Victor Hănescu 1–0
- (Spain) Pablo Carreno-Busta 1–0
- (Argentina) Leonardo Mayer 1–0
- (Slovakia) Lukáš Lacko 1–0
- (Kazakhstan) Mikhail Kukushkin 1–0
- (Austria) Dominic Thiem 1–0
- (Spain) Tommy Robredo 1–1
- **(Switzerland) Stanislas Wawrinka** 1–1

=== Finals ===
==== Singles: 8 (7 titles, 1 runner-up) ====
Category Grand Slam (1–1) ATP World Tour Finals (1–0) ATP World Tour Masters 1000 (4–0) ATP World Tour 500 (1–0) ATP World Tour 250 (0–0)	Titles by surface Hard (5–0) Clay (1–1) Grass (1–0)	Titles by conditions Outdoors (5–1) Indoors (2–0)

Outcome	No.	Date	Tournament	Surface	Opponent in the final	Score in the final
Winner	42.	March 16, 2014	Indian Wells Masters, United States (3)	Hard	(Switzerland) Roger Federer	3–6, 6–3, 7–6^{(7–3)}
Winner	43.	March 30, 2014	Miami Masters, United States (4)	Hard	(Spain) Rafael Nadal	6–3, 6–3
Winner	44.	May 18, 2014	Italian Open, Italy (3)	Clay	(Spain) Rafael Nadal	4–6, 6–3, 6–3
Runner-up	22.	June 9, 2014	French Open, France (2)	Clay	(Spain) Rafael Nadal	6–3, 5–7, 2–6, 4–6
Winner	45.	July 6, 2014	Wimbledon Championships, United Kingdom (2)	Grass	(Switzerland) Roger Federer	6–7^{(7–9)}, 6–4, 7–6^{(7–4)}, 5–7, 6–4
Winner	46.	October 5, 2014	China Open, China (5)	Hard	(Czech Republic) Tomáš Berdych	6–0, 6–2
Winner	47.	November 2, 2014	Paris Masters, France (3)	Hard (i)	(Canada) Milos Raonic	6–2, 6–3
Winner	48.	November 16, 2014	ATP World Tour Finals, United Kingdom (4)	Hard (i)	(Switzerland) Roger Federer	W/O

=== Earnings ===
- **Bold** font denotes tournament win

#	Venue	Singles Prize Money	Year-to-date
1.	Australian Open	A$270,000	$242,811
2.	Dubai Tennis Championships	$99,480	$342,291
3.	**BNP Paribas Open**	**$1,000,000**	$1,342,291
4.	**Sony Open Tennis**	**$787,000**	$2,129,291
5.	Monte-Carlo Rolex Masters	€135,480	$2,313,828
6.	**Internazionali BNL d'Italia**	**€549,000**	$3,061,620
7.	French Open	€825,000	$4,196,617
8.	**Wimbledon Championships**	**£1,760,000**	$7,190,026
9.	Rogers Cup	$39,025	$7,229,051
10.	Western & Southern Open	$41,625	$7,270,676
11.	US Open	$730,000	$8,000,676
12.	**China Open**	**$604,000**	$8,604,676
13.	Shanghai Rolex Masters	$197,060	$8,801,736
14.	**BNP Paribas Masters**	**$723,792**	$9,525,528
15.	**ATP World Tour Finals**	**$2,075,000**	$11,600,528
Bonus Pool		$2,650,000	$14,250,528
Doubles		$18,935	**$14,269,463**
As of December 29, 2014

- source：Novak Djokovic ATP Profile

== See also ==
- 2014 ATP World Tour
- 2014 Roger Federer tennis season
- 2014 Rafael Nadal tennis season
- 2014 Andy Murray tennis season
- 2014 Stanislas Wawrinka tennis season
- 2014 Marin Čilić tennis season
