= 2014 Gerry Weber Open =

- Date: 9–15 June
- Edition: 22nd
- Category: ATP World Tour 250
- Draw: 28S / 16D
- Prize money: €711,010
- Surface: Grass
- Location: Halle, Germany
- Venue: Gerry Weber Stadion

Champions

Singles
- (Switzerland) Roger Federer

Doubles
- (Germany) Andre Begemann / (Austria) Julian Knowle
← 2013 ·	Gerry Weber Open	· 2015 →

The 2014 Gerry Weber Open was a tennis tournament played on outdoor grass courts. It was the 22nd edition of the event known that year as the Gerry Weber Open and was part of the ATP World Tour 250 series of the 2014 ATP World Tour. It took place at the Gerry Weber Stadion in Halle, Germany, between 9 June and 15 June 2014. Second-seeded Roger Federer won his seventh singles title at the event.

== Points and prize money ==
=== Point distribution ===
Event	W	F	SF	QF	Round of 16	Round of 32	Q	Q3	Q2	Q1
Singles	250	150	90	45	20	0	12	6	0	0
Doubles	250	150	90	45	0	—	—	—	—	—

=== Prize money ===
Event	W	F	SF	QF	Round of 16	Round of 32	Q3	Q2	Q1
Singles	€128,860	€67,865	€36,765	€20,945	€12,340	€7,310	€1,180	€565	—
Doubles *	€39,510	€20,580	€11,150	€6,380	€3,740	—	—	—	—

_{* per team}

== Singles main-draw entrants ==
=== Seeds ===
Country	Player	Rank^{1}	Seed
ESP	Rafael Nadal	1	1
SUI	Roger Federer	4	2
CAN	Milos Raonic	9	3
JPN	Kei Nishikori	10	4
FRA	Richard Gasquet	13	5
RUS	Mikhail Youzhny	16	6
~~GER~~	~~Tommy Haas~~	~~18~~	~~7~~
POL	Jerzy Janowicz	23	8

- ^{1} Rankings are as of May 26, 2014.

=== Other entrants ===
The following players received wildcards into the singles main draw:

- (Germany) Dustin Brown
- (Germany) Peter Gojowczyk
- (Germany) Jan-Lennard Struff

The following players received entry from the qualifying draw:

- (France) Pierre-Hugues Herbert
- (Russia) Andrey Kuznetsov
- (Ukraine) Illya Marchenko
- (Croatia) Mate Pavić

The following player received entry as a lucky loser:

- (France) Albano Olivetti

=== Withdrawals ===
Before the tournament

- (Germany) Tommy Haas → replaced by (France) Albano Olivetti
- (Spain) Guillermo García López → replaced by (Poland) Michał Przysiężny
- (Germany) Florian Mayer → replaced by (United States) Steve Johnson
- (Serbia) Janko Tipsarević → replaced by (Germany) Benjamin Becker

During the tournament

- (Russia) Teymuraz Gabashvili
- (Chinese Taipei) Lu Yen-hsun

== Doubles main-draw entrants ==
=== Seeds ===
Country	Player	Country	Player	Rank^{1}	Seed
POL	Łukasz Kubot	SWE	Robert Lindstedt	45	1
COL	Juan Sebastián Cabal	COL	Robert Farah	50	2
NED	Jean-Julien Rojer	ROU	Horia Tecău	54	3
MEX	Santiago González	USA	Scott Lipsky	75	4

- Rankings are as of May 26, 2014.

=== Other entrants ===
The following pairs received wildcards into the doubles main draw:

- (Germany) Dustin Brown / (Germany) Jan-Lennard Struff
- (Switzerland) Marco Chiudinelli / (Switzerland) Roger Federer

The following pair received entry as alternates:

- (Germany) Benjamin Becker / (Russia) Teymuraz Gabashvili

=== Withdrawals ===
Before the tournament

- (Colombia) Robert Farah (right wrist injury)
- (Italy) Andreas Seppi (virus)

During the tournament

- (Poland) Łukasz Kubot (left heel injury)

=== Retirements ===
- (Russia) Teymuraz Gabashvili (right knee injury)

== Finals ==
=== Singles ===
- (Switzerland) Roger Federer defeated (Colombia) Alejandro Falla, 7–6^{(7–2)}, 7–6^{(7–3)}

=== Doubles ===
- (Germany) Andre Begemann / (Austria) Julian Knowle defeated (Switzerland) Marco Chiudinelli / (Switzerland) Roger Federer, 1–6, 7–5, [12–10]
