= 2014 Davis Cup World Group =

2014 edition of the Davis Cup World Group

- Date: 31 January – 23 November
- Edition: 34th

Champions
- Switzerland
- Davis Cup

The World Group was the highest level of Davis Cup competition in 2014. The first-round losers went into the Davis Cup World Group play-offs, and the winners progress to the quarterfinals. The quarterfinalists were guaranteed a World Group spot for 2015. The final took place at the Stade Pierre-Mauroy in Lille, between France and Switzerland on indoor clay. Switzerland won the Davis Cup for the first time, beating France 3–1 in the final.

== Participating teams ==
Participating teams
Argentina	Australia	Belgium	Canada
Czech Republic	France	Germany	Great Britain
Italy	Japan	Kazakhstan	Netherlands
Serbia	Spain	Switzerland	United States

== Seeds ==
1. Czech Republic (semifinals)
2. Serbia (first round)
3. Spain (first round)
4. Argentina (first round)
5. France (final)
6. United States (first round)
7. Canada (first round)
8. Kazakhstan (quarterfinals)

== Draw ==
First round 31 January –2 February
Ostrava, Czech Republic (indoor hard)
1	Czech Republic	3
Netherlands	2
Tokyo, Japan (indoor hard)
7	Canada	1
Japan	4
Frankfurt, Germany (indoor hard)
3	Spain	1
Germany	4
La Roche sur Yon, France (indoor clay)
5	France	5
Australia	0
San Diego, United States (clay)
Great Britain	3
6	United States	1
Mar de Plata, Argentina (clay)
Italy	3
4	Argentina	1
Astana, Kazakhstan (indoor hard)
Belgium	2
8	Kazakhstan	3
Novi Sad, Serbia (indoor hard)
Switzerland	3
2	Serbia	2

Quarterfinals; 4–6 April
Tokyo, Japan (indoor hard)
1	Czech Republic	5
Japan	0
Nancy, France (indoor hard)
Germany	2
5	France	3
Naples, Italy (clay)
Great Britain	2
Italy	3
Geneva, Switzerland (indoor hard)
8	Kazakhstan	2
Switzerland	3

Semifinals; 12–14 September
Paris, France (clay)
1	Czech Republic	1
5	France	4
Geneva, Switzerland (indoor hard)
Italy	2
Switzerland	3

Final; 21–23 November
Lille, France (indoor clay)
5	France	1
Switzerland	3

== First round ==
=== Czech Republic vs. Netherlands ===
Czech Republic
3
CEZ Arena, Ostrava, Czech Republic
31 January – 2 February 2014
Hard (i)

Netherlands
2

			1	2	3	4	5
1	(Czech Republic) (Netherlands)	Radek Štěpánek; Robin Haase	6; 3	4; 6	7^{7} 6^{4}	2; 6	1; 6
2	(Czech Republic) (Netherlands)	Tomáš Berdych; Igor Sijsling	6; 3	6; 3	6; 0
3	(Czech Republic) (Netherlands)	Tomáš Berdych / Radek Štěpánek; Robin Haase / Jean-Julien Rojer	7; 5	1; 6	7^{7} 6^{2}	7^{7} 6^{4}
4	(Czech Republic) (Netherlands)	Tomáš Berdych; Thiemo de Bakker	6; 1	6; 4	6; 3
5	(Czech Republic) (Netherlands)	Lukáš Rosol; Igor Sijsling	3; 6	3; 6

=== Japan vs. Canada ===
Japan
4
Ariake Colosseum, Tokyo, Japan
31 January – 2 February 2014
Hard (i)

Canada
1

			1	2	3	4	5
1	(Japan) (Canada)	Kei Nishikori; Peter Polansky	6; 4	6; 4	6; 4
2	(Japan) (Canada)	Go Soeda; Frank Dancevic	4; 6	6^{2} 7^{7}	1; 6
3	(Japan) (Canada)	Kei Nishikori / Yasutaka Uchiyama; Frank Dancevic / Daniel Nestor	6; 3	7^{7} 6^{3}	4; 6	6; 4
4	(Japan) (Canada)	Kei Nishikori; Frank Dancevic	6; 2	1; 0				retired
5	(Japan) (Canada)	Go Soeda; Peter Polansky	6; 1	6; 4

=== Germany vs. Spain ===
Germany
4
Ballsporthalle, Frankfurt, Germany
31 January – 2 February 2014
Hard (i)

Spain
1

			1	2	3	4	5
1	(Germany) (Spain)	Philipp Kohlschreiber; Roberto Bautista-Agut	6; 2	6; 4	6; 2
2	(Germany) (Spain)	Florian Mayer; Feliciano López	7^{8} 6^{6}	7^{7} 6^{4}	1; 6	5; 7	6; 3
3	(Germany) (Spain)	Tommy Haas / Philipp Kohlschreiber; David Marrero / Fernando Verdasco	7^{7} 6^{5}	6^{9} 7^{11}	7^{9} 6^{7}	6; 3
4	(Germany) (Spain)	Philipp Kohlschreiber; Feliciano López						w/o
5	(Germany) (Spain)	Daniel Brands; Roberto Bautista-Agut	7^{7} 6^{5}	6; 4

=== France vs. Australia ===
France
5
Vendéspace, La Roche sur Yon, France
31 January – 2 February 2014
Clay (i)

Australia
0

			1	2	3	4	5
1	(France) (Australia)	Richard Gasquet; Nick Kyrgios	7^{7} 6^{3}	6; 2	6; 2
2	(France) (Australia)	Jo-Wilfried Tsonga; Lleyton Hewitt	6; 3	6; 2	7^{7} 6^{2}
3	(France) (Australia)	Richard Gasquet / Jo-Wilfried Tsonga; Chris Guccione / Lleyton Hewitt	5; 7	7^{7} 6^{3}	6; 2	7; 5
4	(France) (Australia)	Julien Benneteau; Thanasi Kokkinakis	6; 4	6; 1
5	(France) (Australia)	Gaël Monfils; Nick Kyrgios	7^{7} 6^{5}	6; 4

=== United States vs. Great Britain ===
United States
1
Petco Park, San Diego, United States
31 January – 2 February 2014
Clay

Great Britain
3

			1	2	3	4	5
1	(United States) (United Kingdom)	Donald Young; Andy Murray	1; 6	2; 6	3; 6
2	(United States) (United Kingdom)	Sam Querrey; James Ward	6; 1	6^{3} 7^{7}	6; 3	4; 6	1; 6
3	(United States) (United Kingdom)	Bob Bryan / Mike Bryan; Colin Fleming / Dominic Inglot	6; 2	6; 3	3; 6	6; 1
4	(United States) (United Kingdom)	Sam Querrey; Andy Murray	6^{5} 7^{7}	7^{7} 6^{3}	1; 6	3; 6
5	(United States) (United Kingdom)	Donald Young; James Ward						not played

- Great Britain's victory was their first in the World Group since 1986.

=== Argentina vs. Italy ===
Argentina
1
Patinódromo Municipal, Mar de Plata, Argentina
31 January – 2 February 2014
Clay

Italy
3

			1	2	3	4	5
1	(Argentina) (Italy)	Carlos Berlocq; Andreas Seppi	4; 6	6; 0	6; 2	6; 1
2	(Argentina) (Italy)	Juan Mónaco; Fabio Fognini	5; 7	2; 6	2; 6
3	(Argentina) (Italy)	Eduardo Schwank / Horacio Zeballos; Simone Bolelli / Fabio Fognini	7^{8} 6^{6}	6^{8} 7^{10}	6^{3} 7^{7}	4; 6
4	(Argentina) (Italy)	Carlos Berlocq; Fabio Fognini	6^{5} 7^{7}	6; 4	1; 6	4; 6
5	(Argentina) (Italy)	Juan Mónaco; Andreas Seppi						not played

=== Kazakhstan vs. Belgium ===
Kazakhstan
3
National Tennis Centre, Astana, Kazakhstan
31 January – 2 February 2014
Hard (i)

Belgium
2

			1	2	3	4	5
1	(Kazakhstan) (Belgium)	Mikhail Kukushkin; Ruben Bemelmans	6; 4	6^{3} 7^{7}	6; 2	6; 3
2	(Kazakhstan) (Belgium)	Andrey Golubev; David Goffin	7^{11} 6^{9}	3; 6	4; 6	6; 2	12; 10
3	(Kazakhstan) (Belgium)	Evgeny Korolev / Mikhail Kukushkin; Ruben Bemelmans / Olivier Rochus	2; 6	7^{7} 6^{4}	3; 6	6^{4} 7^{7}
4	(Kazakhstan) (Belgium)	Mikhail Kukushkin; David Goffin	6; 4	3; 6	6; 3	4; 6	0; 6
5	(Kazakhstan) (Belgium)	Andrey Golubev; Ruben Bemelmans	6; 2	6; 3	6; 1

=== Serbia vs. Switzerland ===
Serbia
2
SPENS, Novi Sad, Serbia
31 January – 2 February 2014
Hard (i)

Switzerland
3

			1	2	3	4	5
1	(Serbia) (Switzerland)	Ilija Bozoljac; Roger Federer	4; 6	5; 7	2; 6
2	(Serbia) (Switzerland)	Dušan Lajović; Stanislas Wawrinka	4; 6	6; 4	1; 6	6^{7} 7^{9}
3	(Serbia) (Switzerland)	Filip Krajinović / Nenad Zimonjić; Marco Chiudinelli / Michael Lammer	6^{3} 7^{7}	6; 3	6^{2} 7^{7}	2; 6
4	(Serbia) (Switzerland)	Dušan Lajović; Michael Lammer	6; 3	3; 6	6; 4
5	(Serbia) (Switzerland)	Filip Krajinović; Marco Chiudinelli	6; 4	6; 4

== Quarterfinals ==
=== Japan vs. Czech Republic ===
Japan
0
Ariake Coliseum, Tokyo, Japan
4–6 April 2014
Hard (i)

Czech Republic
5

			1	2	3	4	5
1	(Japan) (Czech Republic)	Tatsuma Ito; Radek Štěpánek	7^{7} 6^{5}	6^{5} 7^{7}	1; 6	5; 7
2	(Japan) (Czech Republic)	Taro Daniel; Lukáš Rosol	4; 6	4; 6	6; 3	6; 4	2; 6
3	(Japan) (Czech Republic)	Tatsuma Ito / Yasutaka Uchiyama; Radek Štěpánek / Lukáš Rosol	4; 6	4; 6	4; 6
4	(Japan) (Czech Republic)	Yasutaka Uchiyama; Lukáš Rosol	3; 6	6; 3	4; 6
5	(Japan) (Czech Republic)	Taro Daniel; Jiří Veselý	4; 6	4; 6

=== France vs. Germany ===
France
3
Palais Des Sports Jean Weille, Nancy, France
4–6 April 2014
Hard (i)

Germany
2

			1	2	3	4	5
1	(France) (Germany)	Julien Benneteau; Tobias Kamke	6^{8} 7^{10}	3; 6	2; 6
2	(France) (Germany)	Jo-Wilfried Tsonga; Peter Gojowczyk	7; 5	6^{3} 7^{7}	6; 3	6^{8} 7^{10}	6; 8
3	(France) (Germany)	Michaël Llodra / Julien Benneteau; Andre Begemann / Tobias Kamke	6; 1	7^{7} 6^{5}	4; 6	7; 5
4	(France) (Germany)	Jo-Wilfried Tsonga; Tobias Kamke	6; 3	6; 2	6; 4
5	(France) (Germany)	Gaël Monfils; Peter Gojowczyk	6; 1	7^{7} 6^{0}	6; 2

=== Italy vs. Great Britain ===
Italy
3
Tennis Club Napoli, Naples, Italy
4–6 April 2014
Clay

Great Britain
2

			1	2	3	4	5
1	(Italy) (United Kingdom)	Fabio Fognini; James Ward	6; 4	2; 6	6; 4	6; 1
2	(Italy) (United Kingdom)	Andreas Seppi; Andy Murray	4; 6	5; 7	3; 6
3	(Italy) (United Kingdom)	Simone Bolelli / Fabio Fognini; Colin Fleming / Andy Murray	4; 6	2; 6	6; 3	5; 7
4	(Italy) (United Kingdom)	Fabio Fognini; Andy Murray	6; 3	6; 3	6; 4
5	(Italy) (United Kingdom)	Andreas Seppi; James Ward	6; 4	6; 3	6; 4

=== Switzerland vs. Kazakhstan ===
Switzerland
3
Palexpo, Geneva, Switzerland
4–6 April 2014
Hard (i)

Kazakhstan
2

			1	2	3	4	5
1	(Switzerland) (Kazakhstan)	Stanislas Wawrinka; Andrey Golubev	6^{5} 7^{7}	2; 6	6; 3	6^{5} 7^{7}
2	(Switzerland) (Kazakhstan)	Roger Federer; Mikhail Kukushkin	6; 4	6; 4	6; 2
3	(Switzerland) (Kazakhstan)	Roger Federer / Stanislas Wawrinka; Andrey Golubev / Aleksandr Nedovesov	4; 6	6^{5} 7^{7}	6; 4	6^{6} 7^{8}
4	(Switzerland) (Kazakhstan)	Stanislas Wawrinka; Mikhail Kukushkin	6^{4} 7^{7}	6; 4	6; 4	6; 4
5	(Switzerland) (Kazakhstan)	Roger Federer; Andrey Golubev	7^{7} 6^{0}	6; 2	6; 3

== Semifinals ==
=== France vs. Czech Republic ===
France
4
Roland Garros, Paris, France
12–14 September 2014
Clay

Czech Republic
1

			1	2	3	4	5
1	(France) (Czech Republic)	Richard Gasquet; Tomáš Berdych	6; 3	6; 2	6; 3
2	(France) (Czech Republic)	Jo-Wilfried Tsonga; Lukáš Rosol	6; 2	6; 2	6; 3
3	(France) (Czech Republic)	Richard Gasquet / Jo-Wilfried Tsonga; Tomáš Berdych / Radek Štěpánek	6^{4} 7^{7}	6; 4	7^{7} 6^{5}	6; 1
4	(France) (Czech Republic)	Julien Benneteau; Jiří Veselý	4; 6	3; 6
5	(France) (Czech Republic)	Gaël Monfils; Lukáš Rosol	5; 7	6; 4	7; 5

=== Switzerland vs. Italy ===
Switzerland
3
Palexpo, Geneva, Switzerland
12–14 September 2014
Hard (i)

Italy
2

			1	2	3	4	5
1	(Switzerland) (Italy)	Roger Federer; Simone Bolelli	7^{7} 6^{5}	6; 4	6; 4
2	(Switzerland) (Italy)	Stan Wawrinka; Fabio Fognini	6; 2	6; 3	6; 2
3	(Switzerland) (Italy)	Marco Chiudinelli / Stan Wawrinka; Simone Bolelli / Fabio Fognini	5; 7	6; 3	7; 5	3; 6	2; 6
4	(Switzerland) (Italy)	Roger Federer; Fabio Fognini	6; 2	6; 3	7^{7} 6^{4}
5	(Switzerland) (Italy)	Michael Lammer; Andreas Seppi	4; 6	6; 1	4; 6

== Final ==
=== France vs. Switzerland ===
France
1
Stade Pierre-Mauroy, Lille, France
21–23 November 2014
Clay (i)

Switzerland
3

			1	2	3	4	5
1	(France) (Switzerland)	Jo-Wilfried Tsonga; Stan Wawrinka	1; 6	6; 3	3; 6	2; 6
2	(France) (Switzerland)	Gaël Monfils; Roger Federer	6; 1	6; 4	6; 3
3	(France) (Switzerland)	Julien Benneteau / Richard Gasquet; Roger Federer / Stan Wawrinka	3; 6	5; 7	4; 6
4	(France) (Switzerland)	Richard Gasquet; Roger Federer	4; 6	2; 6	2; 6
5	(France) (Switzerland)	Gaël Monfils; Stan Wawrinka						not played
