= 2014 Monte-Carlo Rolex Masters =

- Date: 12–20 April
- Edition: 108th
- Category: Masters 1000
- Draw: 56S / 24D
- Prize money: €3,452,415
- Surface: Clay / outdoor
- Location: Roquebrune-Cap-Martin, France (billed as Monte Carlo, Monaco)
- Venue: Monte Carlo Country Club

Champions

Singles
- (Switzerland) Stan Wawrinka

Doubles
- (United States) Bob Bryan / (United States) Mike Bryan
← 2013 ·	Monte-Carlo Masters	· 2015 →

The 2014 Monte-Carlo Rolex Masters was a men's tennis tournament for male professional players, played from 12 April through 20 April 2014, on outdoor clay courts. It was the 108th edition of the annual Monte Carlo Masters tournament, which was sponsored by Rolex for the sixth time. It took place at the Monte Carlo Country Club in Roquebrune-Cap-Martin, France, near Monte Carlo, Monaco. Third-seeded Stan Wawrinka won the singles title.

== Finals ==
=== Singles ===
- (Switzerland) Stan Wawrinka defeated (Switzerland) Roger Federer, 4–6, 7–6^{(7–5)}, 6–2

=== Doubles ===
- (United States) Bob Bryan / (United States) Mike Bryan defeated (Croatia) Ivan Dodig / (Brazil) Marcelo Melo, 6–3, 3–6, [10–8]

== Points and prize money ==
=== Points distribution ===
Because the Monte Carlo Masters is the non-mandatory Masters 1000 event, special rules regarding points distribution are in place. The Monte Carlo Masters counts as one of a player's 500 level tournaments, while distributing Masters 1000 points.

Event	W	F	SF	QF	Round of 16	Round of 32	Round of 64	Q	Q2	Q1
Singles	1000	600	360	180	90	45	10	25	16	0
Doubles	1000	600	360	180	90	45	0	—	—	—

=== Prize money ===
The total prize money pot for the 2014 competition is €3,452,415, distributed throughout both competitions.

== Singles main-draw entrants ==
=== Seeds ===
Country	Player	Rank	Seed
ESP	Rafael Nadal	1	1
SRB	Novak Djokovic	2	2
SUI	Stan Wawrinka	3	3
SUI	Roger Federer	4	4
CZE	Tomáš Berdych	5	5
ESP	David Ferrer	6	6
~~FRA~~	~~Richard Gasquet~~	~~10~~	~~7~~
CAN	Milos Raonic	11	8
FRA	Jo-Wilfried Tsonga	12	9
ITA	Fabio Fognini	13	10
ESP	Tommy Robredo	14	11
BUL	Grigor Dimitrov	15	12
RUS	Mikhail Youzhny	16	13
RSA	Kevin Anderson	19	14
ESP	Nicolás Almagro	20	15
POL	Jerzy Janowicz	21	16
UKR	Alexandr Dolgopolov	22	17

- Rankings are as of April 7, 2014

=== Other entrants ===
The following players received wildcards into the main draw:

- (Monaco) Benjamin Balleret
- (Italy) Simone Bolelli
- (Switzerland) Roger Federer
- (Austria) Dominic Thiem

The following players received entry via qualifying:

- (Russia) Evgeny Donskoy
- (Russia) Teymuraz Gabashvili
- (Belgium) David Goffin
- (France) Michaël Llodra
- (France) Paul-Henri Mathieu
- (Spain) Albert Montañés
- (Spain) Albert Ramos

The following players received entry as lucky losers:

- (Spain) Pablo Carreño Busta
- (Australia) Marinko Matosevic

=== Withdrawals ===
Before the tournament

- (France) Richard Gasquet → replaced by (Spain) Pablo Carreño Busta
- (Germany) Tommy Haas → replaced by (Netherlands) Igor Sijsling
- (Germany) Florian Mayer → replaced by (Spain) Guillermo García López
- (Spain) Fernando Verdasco → replaced by (Australia) Marinko Matosevic

During the tournament

- (Spain) Nicolás Almagro

== Doubles main-draw entrants ==
=== Seeds ===
Country	Player	Country	Player	Rank	Seed
USA	Bob Bryan	USA	Mike Bryan	2	1
AUT	Alexander Peya	BRA	Bruno Soares	6	2
CRO	Ivan Dodig	BRA	Marcelo Melo	11	3
~~ESP~~	~~David Marrero~~	~~ESP~~	~~Fernando Verdasco~~	~~16~~	~~4~~
CAN	Daniel Nestor	SRB	Nenad Zimonjić	28	5
FRA	Michaël Llodra	FRA	Nicolas Mahut	29	6
POL	Łukasz Kubot	SWE	Robert Lindstedt	35	7
FRA	Julien Benneteau	FRA	Édouard Roger-Vasselin	35	8

- Rankings are as of April 7, 2014

=== Other entrants ===
The following pairs received wildcards into the doubles main draw:

- (Monaco) Romain Arneodo / (Monaco) Benjamin Balleret
- (France) Jérémy Chardy / (France) Gilles Simon

The following pair received entry as alternates:

- (Spain) Roberto Bautista Agut / (Italy) Andreas Seppi

=== Withdrawal ===
Before the tournament

- (Spain) Fernando Verdasco
