= 2014 Rafael Nadal tennis season =

Statistics for Spanish tennis player

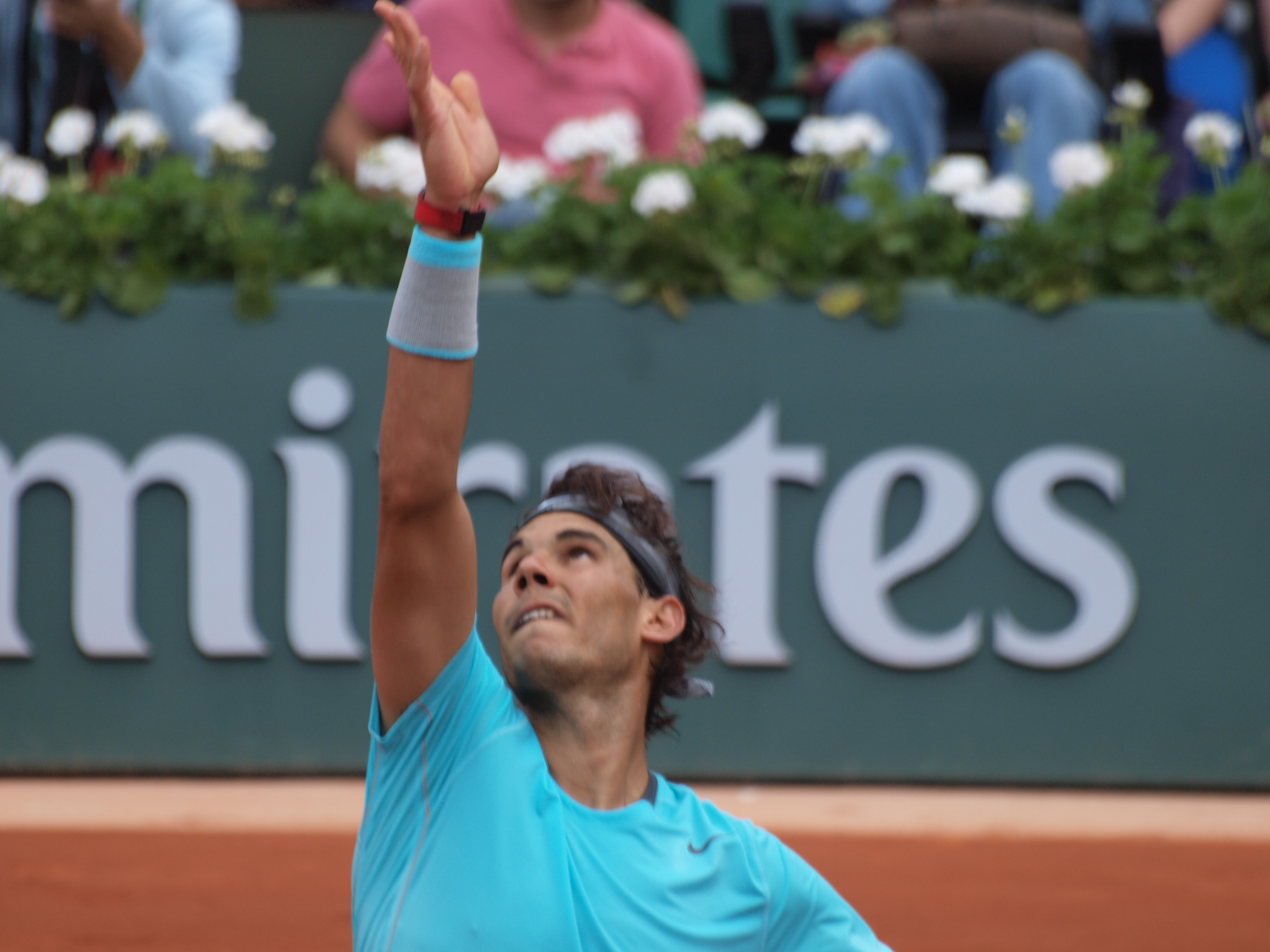
- Full name: Rafael Nadal
- Country: Spain
- Calendar prize money: $6,066,446 (singles & doubles)

Singles
- Season record: 48–11
- Calendar titles: 4
- Year-end ranking: No. 3
- Ranking change from previous year: ▼2

Grand Slam & significant results
- Australian Open: F
- French Open: W
- Wimbledon: 4R
- US Open: A

Doubles
- Season record: 1–1
- Calendar titles: 0
- Current ranking: No. 306
- Ranking change from previous year: ▲70

Grand Slam mixed doubles results
- Injuries: Back Injury (January); Wrist Injury (August)
- Last updated on: 17 March 2014.

The 2014 Rafael Nadal tennis season officially began on 30 December 2013 with the start of the 2014 Qatar ExxonMobil Open. This season saw Nadal suffer from injuries that included a back injury, a wrist injury, and appendicitis. After losing in the final of the Australian Open where he suffered from a back injury, Nadal failed to defend his titles at Indian Wells, Barcelona, and Rome. He rebounded by claiming his 9th French Open. Prior to the North American hardcourt season, Nadal would experience another injury, this time a wrist injury which forced him to withdraw from the Rogers Cup, the Western & Southern Open and the US Open where he was the defending champion. Nadal announced on 24 October that he would not be competing for rest of the season due to appendicitis and eventually underwent surgery. Despite an injury plagued season, Nadal still ended the year at No. 3 with four titles.

== Year summary ==
=== Early hard court season and Australian Open ===
==== Qatar Open ====
Rafael Nadal won the title at 2014 Qatar Open after defeating Gaël Monfils in the final on January 4.

==== Australian Open ====
Nadal reached his third final Down Under by dispatching his old rival Roger Federer in the semi-finals with a straight set victory and by dropping only one set on the way, against Grigor Dimitrov in the quarter-finals. Victory in the final would have seen Nadal equal Pete Sampras's total of 14 major titles and also become only the third man to win all four grand slams at least twice, Roy Emerson and Rod Laver being the other two. In the final, though, he was unexpectedly beaten by Stanislas Wawrinka, who had previously never beaten Nadal or even won a set against him in 12 previous meetings. At a set and a break down, Nadal sustained a back injury that saw him swiftly lose the second set. He recovered enough to win the third and fought hard before Wawrinka prevailed in four sets.

==== Rio Open ====
Nadal won the inaugural Rio Open after beating Alexandr Dolgopolov in the final on February 23. In the semifinal a day earlier, he had to save two match points in the 3rd set tie breaker to win against Pablo Andújar.

==== Indian Wells Masters ====
Nadal next competed in the Indian Wells Masters. He received a bye in the first round and fought back from a set down to overcome Radek Štěpánek in the second round. His tournament ended in the next round, though, as Alexandr Dolgopolov exacted a measure of revenge for his Rio Open final loss by dispatching Nadal in a third set tie break.

==== Miami Masters ====
After not competing in 2013, Nadal returned to Key Biscane for a chance at his first Miami Masters title. He dominated his first three opponents, losing a total of nine games combined. He then fought back from a set down to overcome Milos Raonic in the quarter-finals. In an unprecedented event both Novak Djokovic and he received walkovers from their semi-final opponents to set up their 40th clash. It was Nadal's fourth Miami final, following runner-up finishes in 2005, 2008, and 2011. Nadal would once again fail to lift the trophy, though, as Djokovic displayed near perfect form and eased his way to a two-set victory.

=== Spring clay court season and French Open ===
==== Monte-Carlo Masters ====
After finally relinquishing his Monte-Carlo crown to Novak Djokovic in 2013, Nadal returned to the red clay in an attempt to reclaim the title that had been his from 2005 to 2012. As expected the King of Clay won his first two matches with ease. His victory against Andreas Seppi in the third round brought his career clay court wins to 300, a feat achieved by only ten other players. In the quarter-finals, though, Nadal would succumb to the relentless attack of David Ferrer. It was the first time Ferrer had beaten Nadal on clay in ten years and the first time Nadal failed to reach the Monte-Carlo final since his first stint in the tournament as a qualifier in 2003.

==== Barcelona Open ====
Nadal hadn't lost a match at the Barcelona Open since 2003 and hadn't lost a set at the tournament since dropping one against David Ferrer in the 2008 final. These streaks seemed destined to continue and did against his first two opponents, both of whom he dispatched in straight sets. In the quarter-finals, Nadal's set streak ended at 44 when Nicolás Almagro took the second set of their match in a tight tiebreak. Almagro would also put an end to Nadal's win streak at 41 when he clinched the match by winning the third set as well.

==== Madrid Open ====
Nadal claimed his fourth Madrid Open crown (third on clay) by defeating Kei Nishikori in the final. Nadal was down a set and a break in the final when Nishikori began showing signs of injury. This injury aided Nadal as he fought back to win the second set and take a three-game lead in the third before Nishikori retired.

==== Italian Open ====
Nadal made his ninth final at the Italian Open and was vying for his eighth title, but was beaten in three sets by his rival Novak Djokovic in the final. In the second round, Nadal played the longest three set match of the year (thus far) by battling Gilles Simon for 199 minutes. In the third round and quarter-final, he was forced to rally from a set down to claim victory against Mikhail Youzhny and Andy Murray respectively. His loss marked the first time in ten years that he would enter into the French Open with fewer than two European clay court titles.

==== French Open ====
Despite a sub-par European clay court season, Nadal entered the second Major of the year with a 59–1 record at the event. By the end of the tournament Nadal would extend this record to 66–1 by claiming his record fifth consecutive and record ninth French Open title with a four set victory over Novak Djokovic. He won his first four rounds against Robby Ginepri, Dominic Thiem, Leonardo Mayer, and Dušan Lajović, respectively, without dropping a set. In the quarter-finals, he faced last year's finalist, David Ferrer. He dropped the opening set, his first of the tournament, but went on to win in four sets. In the semi-finals, he put on a devastating display and lost only six games as he dispatched Andy Murray in straight sets. The final was a rematch of last year's semifinal and the 2012 final as well as his 42nd match against Novak Djokovic. In winning his 9th Roland Garros title, Nadal became the only player to have won one Grand Slam for ten consecutive years.

=== Grass court season and Wimbledon ===
==== Halle Open ====
Nadal received a bye in the first round and then lost to Dustin Brown in the second round. The loss marked Nadal's third consecutive defeat on grass and dropped his record on the surface to 2–5 since he reached the 2011 Wimbledon final.

==== Wimbledon ====
Having been bounced in the second round by Lukáš Rosol in 2012, the first round by Steve Darcis in 2013, and riding a three match grass losing streak, Nadal entered the 2014 edition of Wimbledon looking for redemption. His first match started off rocky as he dropped the opening set against Martin Kližan, but he recovered to win in four and snap his losing streak. Up next was his 2012 conqueror, Rosol. Rosol looked capable of pulling out the upset once again as he led by a set and a break, but Nadal righted the ship and got revenge for his 2012 defeat by pulling the match out in four. Nadal again recovered from a set down against Mikhail Kukushkin in the third round, marking the first time in his career that he won three consecutive matches after dropping the first set. Nadal went on to face 19-year-old wildcard Nick Kyrgios in the fourth round and once again dropped the opening set, but was unable to recover this time and succumbed to Kyrgios in four sets. It was Nadal's first defeat to a player born in the 1990s and the first time a teenager had beaten the World No. 1 at a Grand Slam since Nadal himself beat Roger Federer at the 2005 French Open.

=== Summer hard court season ===
==== Canadian Open, Cincinnati Masters, and US Open ====
Nadal was the defending champion of all three tournaments, but had to withdraw from each because he was unable to recover from a right wrist injury that he suffered while practicing on July 29.

=== Asian Swing ===
==== China Open ====
Nadal returned to action from his wrist injury after three months away from the tour with a dominant two set victory over Richard Gasquet. He won the next round as well, but rust and lack of training became apparent as he fell to Martin Kližan in the quarters.

==== Shanghai Masters ====
Before his opening match, Nadal announced that he had been receiving aggressive medical treatment for appendicitis in hopes of avoiding surgery until the end of the tennis season. The effects of this ailment, though, could be seen in his movement and play in his opening match as Feliciano López handed him a straight set defeat.

=== Indoor hard court season and World Tour Finals ===
==== Swiss indoors ====
Nadal seemed to be back to his winning ways as he easily dispatched his first two opponents. In the quarter-finals, though, he ran into red hot 17-year-old Borna Ćorić and was beaten in straight sets.

==== Paris Masters and ATP World Tour Finals ====
After his defeat in Basel, Nadal announced that he was not in a condition to be able to compete at the level necessary to win and opted out of both the Paris Masters and the ATP World Tour Finals to have surgery for his appendicitis. It was the third time that Nadal was forced to withdraw from the ATP World Tour Finals after he had qualified.

== All matches ==
Key
W	F	SF	QF	#R	RR	Q#	P#	DNQ	A	Z#	PO	G	S	B	NMS	NTI	P	NH

(W) winner; (F) finalist; (SF) semifinalist; (QF) quarterfinalist; (#R) rounds 4, 3, 2, 1; (RR) round-robin stage; (Q#) qualification round; (P#) preliminary round; (DNQ) did not qualify; (A) absent; (Z#) Davis/Fed Cup Zonal Group (with number indication) or (PO) play-off; (G) gold, (S) silver or (B) bronze Olympic/Paralympic medal; (NMS) not a Masters tournament; (NTI) not a Tier I tournament; (P) postponed; (NH) not held; (SR) strike rate (events won / competed); (W–L) win–loss record.
To avoid confusion and double counting, these charts are updated at the conclusion of a tournament or when the player's participation has ended.

=== Singles matches ===
Tournament	Match	Round	Opponent (seed or key)	Rank	Result	Score
Qatar ExxonMobil Open; Doha, Qatar; ATP 250; Hard, outdoor 30 December 2013 – 5 January 2014
Qatar ExxonMobil Open; Doha, Qatar; ATP 250; Hard, outdoor 30 December 2013 – 5 January 2014	1 / 788	1R	(Czech Republic) Lukáš Rosol	47	Win	6–2, 7–6^{(9–7)}
Qatar ExxonMobil Open; Doha, Qatar; ATP 250; Hard, outdoor 30 December 2013 – 5 January 2014	2 / 789	2R	(Germany) Tobias Kamke	74	Win	6–3, 6–7^{(3–7)}, 6–3
Qatar ExxonMobil Open; Doha, Qatar; ATP 250; Hard, outdoor 30 December 2013 – 5 January 2014	3 / 790	QF	(Latvia) Ernests Gulbis (7)	27	Win	7–5, 6–4
Qatar ExxonMobil Open; Doha, Qatar; ATP 250; Hard, outdoor 30 December 2013 – 5 January 2014	4 / 791	SF	(Germany) Peter Gojowczyk (Q)	162	Win	4–6, 6–2, 6–3
Qatar ExxonMobil Open; Doha, Qatar; ATP 250; Hard, outdoor 30 December 2013 – 5 January 2014	5 / 792	W	(France) Gaël Monfils	31	Win (1)	6–1, 6–7^{(5–7)}, 6–2
Australian Open; Melbourne, Australia; Grand Slam tournament Hard, outdoor 13–26 January 2014
Australian Open; Melbourne, Australia; Grand Slam tournament Hard, outdoor 13–26 January 2014	6 / 793	1R	(Australia) Bernard Tomic	57	Win	6–4, ret.
Australian Open; Melbourne, Australia; Grand Slam tournament Hard, outdoor 13–26 January 2014	7 / 794	2R	(Australia) Thanasi Kokkinakis (WC)	570	Win	6–2, 6–4, 6–2
Australian Open; Melbourne, Australia; Grand Slam tournament Hard, outdoor 13–26 January 2014	8 / 795	3R	(France) Gaël Monfils (25)	32	Win	6–1, 6–2, 6–3
Australian Open; Melbourne, Australia; Grand Slam tournament Hard, outdoor 13–26 January 2014	9 / 796	4R	(Japan) Kei Nishikori (16)	17	Win	7–6^{(7–3)}, 7–5, 7–6^{(7–3)}
Australian Open; Melbourne, Australia; Grand Slam tournament Hard, outdoor 13–26 January 2014	10 / 797	QF	(Bulgaria) Grigor Dimitrov (22)	22	Win	3–6, 7–6^{(7–3)}, 7–6^{(9–7)}, 6–2
Australian Open; Melbourne, Australia; Grand Slam tournament Hard, outdoor 13–26 January 2014	11 / 798	SF	(Switzerland) Roger Federer (6)	6	Win	7–6^{(7–4)}, 6–3, 6–3
Australian Open; Melbourne, Australia; Grand Slam tournament Hard, outdoor 13–26 January 2014	12 / 799	F	(Switzerland) Stanislas Wawrinka (8)	8	Loss (1)	3–6, 2–6, 6–3, 3–6
Rio Open; Rio de Janeiro, Brazil; ATP 500; Clay, outdoor 17–23 February 2014
Rio Open; Rio de Janeiro, Brazil; ATP 500; Clay, outdoor 17–23 February 2014	13 / 800	1R	(Spain) Daniel Gimeno Traver	84	Win	6–3, 7–5
Rio Open; Rio de Janeiro, Brazil; ATP 500; Clay, outdoor 17–23 February 2014	14 / 801	2R	(Spain) Albert Montañés	72	Win	6–1, 6–2
Rio Open; Rio de Janeiro, Brazil; ATP 500; Clay, outdoor 17–23 February 2014	15 / 802	QF	(Portugal) João Sousa	48	Win	6–1, 6–0
Rio Open; Rio de Janeiro, Brazil; ATP 500; Clay, outdoor 17–23 February 2014	16 / 803	SF	(Spain) Pablo Andújar (8)	40	Win	2–6, 6–3, 7–6^{(12–10)}
Rio Open; Rio de Janeiro, Brazil; ATP 500; Clay, outdoor 17–23 February 2014	17 / 804	W	(Ukraine) Alexandr Dolgopolov	54	Win (2)	6–3, 7–6^{(7–3)}
BNP Paribas Open; Indian Wells, United States; ATP 1000; Hard, outdoor 3–16 March 2014
BNP Paribas Open; Indian Wells, United States; ATP 1000; Hard, outdoor 3–16 March 2014	–	1R	Bye			
BNP Paribas Open; Indian Wells, United States; ATP 1000; Hard, outdoor 3–16 March 2014	18 / 805	2R	(Czech Republic) Radek Štěpánek	50	Win	2–6, 6–4, 7–5
BNP Paribas Open; Indian Wells, United States; ATP 1000; Hard, outdoor 3–16 March 2014	19 / 806	3R	(Ukraine) Alexandr Dolgopolov	31	Loss	3–6, 6–3, 6–7^{(5–7)}
Sony Open Tennis; Miami, United States; ATP 1000; Hard, outdoor 17–30 March 2014
Sony Open Tennis; Miami, United States; ATP 1000; Hard, outdoor 17–30 March 2014	–	1R	Bye			
Sony Open Tennis; Miami, United States; ATP 1000; Hard, outdoor 17–30 March 2014	20 / 807	2R	(Australia) Lleyton Hewitt	44	Win	6–1, 6–3
Sony Open Tennis; Miami, United States; ATP 1000; Hard, outdoor 17–30 March 2014	21 / 808	3R	(Uzbekistan) Denis Istomin	57	Win	6–1, 6–0
Sony Open Tennis; Miami, United States; ATP 1000; Hard, outdoor 17–30 March 2014	22 / 809	4R	(Italy) Fabio Fognini (14)	14	Win	6–2, 6–2
Sony Open Tennis; Miami, United States; ATP 1000; Hard, outdoor 17–30 March 2014	23 / 810	QF	(Canada) Milos Raonic (12)	12	Win	4–6, 6–2, 6–4
Sony Open Tennis; Miami, United States; ATP 1000; Hard, outdoor 17–30 March 2014	–	SF	(Czech Republic) Tomáš Berdych (7)	7	W/O	N/A
Sony Open Tennis; Miami, United States; ATP 1000; Hard, outdoor 17–30 March 2014	24 / 811	F	(Serbia) Novak Djokovic (2)	2	Loss (2)	3–6, 3–6
Monte-Carlo Rolex Masters; Monte Carlo, Monaco; ATP 1000; Clay, outdoor 12–20 April 2014
Monte-Carlo Rolex Masters; Monte Carlo, Monaco; ATP 1000; Clay, outdoor 12–20 April 2014	–	1R	Bye			
Monte-Carlo Rolex Masters; Monte Carlo, Monaco; ATP 1000; Clay, outdoor 12–20 April 2014	25 / 812	2R	(Russia) Teymuraz Gabashvili	58	Win	6–4, 6–1
Monte-Carlo Rolex Masters; Monte Carlo, Monaco; ATP 1000; Clay, outdoor 12–20 April 2014	26 / 813	3R	(Italy) Andreas Seppi	35	Win	6–1, 6–3
Monte-Carlo Rolex Masters; Monte Carlo, Monaco; ATP 1000; Clay, outdoor 12–20 April 2014	27 / 814	QF	(Spain) David Ferrer (6)	6	Loss	6–7^{(1–7)}, 4–6
Barcelona Open BancSabadell; Barcelona, Spain; ATP 500; Clay, outdoor 21–27 April 2014
Barcelona Open BancSabadell; Barcelona, Spain; ATP 500; Clay, outdoor 21–27 April 2014	–	1R	Bye			
Barcelona Open BancSabadell; Barcelona, Spain; ATP 500; Clay, outdoor 21–27 April 2014	28 / 815	2R	(Spain) Albert Ramos	103	Win	7–6^{(7–2)}, 6–4
Barcelona Open BancSabadell; Barcelona, Spain; ATP 500; Clay, outdoor 21–27 April 2014	29 / 816	3R	(Croatia) Ivan Dodig	37	Win	6–3, 6–3
Barcelona Open BancSabadell; Barcelona, Spain; ATP 500; Clay, outdoor 21–27 April 2014	30 / 817	QF	(Spain) Nicolás Almagro (6)	20	Loss	6–2, 6–7^{(5–7)}, 4–6
Madrid Open; Madrid, Spain; ATP 1000; Clay, outdoor 5–11 May 2014
Madrid Open; Madrid, Spain; ATP 1000; Clay, outdoor 5–11 May 2014	–	1R	Bye			
Madrid Open; Madrid, Spain; ATP 1000; Clay, outdoor 5–11 May 2014	31 / 818	2R	(Argentina) Juan Mónaco	56	Win	6–1, 6–0
Madrid Open; Madrid, Spain; ATP 1000; Clay, outdoor 5–11 May 2014	32 / 819	3R	(Finland) Jarkko Nieminen	57	Win	6–1, 6–4
Madrid Open; Madrid, Spain; ATP 1000; Clay, outdoor 5–11 May 2014	33 / 820	QF	(Czech Republic) Tomáš Berdych (6)	6	Win	6–4, 6–2
Madrid Open; Madrid, Spain; ATP 1000; Clay, outdoor 5–11 May 2014	34 / 821	SF	(Spain) Roberto Bautista Agut	45	Win	6–4, 6–3
Madrid Open; Madrid, Spain; ATP 1000; Clay, outdoor 5–11 May 2014	35 / 822	W	(Japan) Kei Nishikori (10)	12	Win (3)	2–6, 6–4, 3–0 ret.
Italian Open; Rome, Italy; ATP 1000; Clay, outdoor 12–18 May 2014
Italian Open; Rome, Italy; ATP 1000; Clay, outdoor 12–18 May 2014	–	1R	Bye			
Italian Open; Rome, Italy; ATP 1000; Clay, outdoor 12–18 May 2014	36 / 823	2R	(France) Gilles Simon	30	Win	7–6^{(7–1)}, 6–7^{(4–7)}, 6–2
Italian Open; Rome, Italy; ATP 1000; Clay, outdoor 12–18 May 2014	37 / 824	3R	(Russia) Mikhail Youzhny (14)	16	Win	6–7^{(4–7)}, 6–2, 6–1
Italian Open; Rome, Italy; ATP 1000; Clay, outdoor 12–18 May 2014	38 / 825	QF	(United Kingdom) Andy Murray (7)	8	Win	1–6, 6–3, 7–5
Italian Open; Rome, Italy; ATP 1000; Clay, outdoor 12–18 May 2014	39 / 826	SF	(Bulgaria) Grigor Dimitrov (12)	14	Win	6–2, 6–2
Italian Open; Rome, Italy; ATP 1000; Clay, outdoor 12–18 May 2014	40 / 827	F	(Serbia) Novak Djokovic (2)	2	Loss (3)	6–4, 3–6, 3–6
French Open; Paris, France; Grand Slam tournament Clay, outdoor 25 May – 08 June 2014
French Open; Paris, France; Grand Slam tournament Clay, outdoor 25 May – 08 June 2014	41 / 828	1R	(United States) Robby Ginepri (WC)	279	Win	6–0, 6–3, 6–0
French Open; Paris, France; Grand Slam tournament Clay, outdoor 25 May – 08 June 2014	42 / 829	2R	(Austria) Dominic Thiem	57	Win	6–2, 6–2, 6–3
French Open; Paris, France; Grand Slam tournament Clay, outdoor 25 May – 08 June 2014	43 / 830	3R	(Argentina) Leonardo Mayer	65	Win	6–2, 7–5, 6–2
French Open; Paris, France; Grand Slam tournament Clay, outdoor 25 May – 08 June 2014	44 / 831	4R	(Serbia) Dušan Lajović	83	Win	6–1, 6–2, 6–1
French Open; Paris, France; Grand Slam tournament Clay, outdoor 25 May – 08 June 2014	45 / 832	QF	(Spain) David Ferrer (5)	5	Win	4–6, 6–4, 6–0, 6–1
French Open; Paris, France; Grand Slam tournament Clay, outdoor 25 May – 08 June 2014	46 / 833	SF	(United Kingdom) Andy Murray (7)	8	Win	6–3, 6–2, 6–1
French Open; Paris, France; Grand Slam tournament Clay, outdoor 25 May – 08 June 2014	47 / 834	W	(Serbia) Novak Djokovic (2)	2	Win (4)	3–6, 7–5, 6–2, 6–4
Gerry Weber Open; Halle, Germany; ATP 250; Grass, outdoor 9–15 June 2014
Gerry Weber Open; Halle, Germany; ATP 250; Grass, outdoor 9–15 June 2014	–	1R	Bye			
Gerry Weber Open; Halle, Germany; ATP 250; Grass, outdoor 9–15 June 2014	48 / 835	2R	(Germany) Dustin Brown (WC)	85	Loss	4–6, 1–6
Wimbledon; London, United Kingdom; Grand Slam tournament Grass, outdoor 23 June – 6 July 2014
Wimbledon; London, United Kingdom; Grand Slam tournament Grass, outdoor 23 June – 6 July 2014	49 / 836	1R	(Slovakia) Martin Kližan	51	Win	4–6, 6–3, 6–3, 6–3
Wimbledon; London, United Kingdom; Grand Slam tournament Grass, outdoor 23 June – 6 July 2014	50 / 837	2R	(Czech Republic) Lukáš Rosol	52	Win	4–6, 7–6^{(8–6)}, 6–4, 6–4
Wimbledon; London, United Kingdom; Grand Slam tournament Grass, outdoor 23 June – 6 July 2014	51 / 838	3R	(Kazakhstan) Mikhail Kukushkin	65	Win	6–7^{(4–7)},6–1, 6–1, 6–1
Wimbledon; London, United Kingdom; Grand Slam tournament Grass, outdoor 23 June – 6 July 2014	52 / 839	4R	(Australia) Nick Kyrgios	144	Loss	6–7^{(5–7)}, 7–5, 6–7^{(5–7)}, 3–6
China Open; Beijing, China; ATP 500; Hard, outdoor 29 September – 5 October 2014
China Open; Beijing, China; ATP 500; Hard, outdoor 29 September – 5 October 2014	53 / 840	1R	(France) Richard Gasquet	22	Win	6–4, 6–0
China Open; Beijing, China; ATP 500; Hard, outdoor 29 September – 5 October 2014	54 / 841	2R	(Germany) Peter Gojowczyk	122	Win	6–3, 6–4
China Open; Beijing, China; ATP 500; Hard, outdoor 29 September – 5 October 2014	55 / 842	QF	(Slovakia) Martin Kližan	56	Loss	7–6^{(9–7)}, 4–6, 3–6
Shanghai Masters; Shanghai, China; ATP 1000; Hard, outdoor 5–14 October 2014
Shanghai Masters; Shanghai, China; ATP 1000; Hard, outdoor 5–14 October 2014	–	1R	Bye			
Shanghai Masters; Shanghai, China; ATP 1000; Hard, outdoor 5–14 October 2014	56 / 843	2R	(Spain) Feliciano López	21	Loss	3–6, 6–7^{(6–8)}
Swiss Indoors; Basel, Switzerland; ATP 500; Hard, indoor 18–26 October 2014
Swiss Indoors; Basel, Switzerland; ATP 500; Hard, indoor 18–26 October 2014	57 / 844	1R	(Italy) Simone Bolelli	77	Win	6–2, 6–2
Swiss Indoors; Basel, Switzerland; ATP 500; Hard, indoor 18–26 October 2014	58 / 845	2R	(France) Pierre-Hugues Herbert	120	Win	6–1, 6–1
Swiss Indoors; Basel, Switzerland; ATP 500; Hard, indoor 18–26 October 2014	59 / 846	QF	(Croatia) Borna Ćorić	124	Loss	2–6, 6–7^{(4–7)}

=== Doubles matches ===
Tournament	Match	Round	Opponents (seed or key)	Ranks	Result	Score
Qatar Open; Doha, Qatar; ATP 250; Hard, outdoor 30 December 2013 – 4 January 2014; Partner: (Spain) Francisco Roig
Qatar Open; Doha, Qatar; ATP 250; Hard, outdoor 30 December 2013 – 4 January 2014; Partner: (Spain) Francisco Roig	1 / 165	1R	(Spain) Pablo Andújar / (Czech Republic) Lukáš Rosol	#170 / #72	Win	6–3, 2–6, 6–4
Qatar Open; Doha, Qatar; ATP 250; Hard, outdoor 30 December 2013 – 4 January 2014; Partner: (Spain) Francisco Roig	2 / 166	QF	(Croatia) Ivan Dodig / (Brazil) Marcelo Melo (3)	#7 / #6	Loss	4–6, 6–7 ^{(1–7)}
China Open; Beijing, China; ATP 500; Hard, outdoor 29 September – 5 October 2014; Partner: (Spain) Pablo Andújar
China Open; Beijing, China; ATP 500; Hard, outdoor 29 September – 5 October 2014; Partner: (Spain) Pablo Andújar	3 / 167	1R	(Czech Republic) Tomáš Berdych / (United States) John Isner (3)	#190 / #143	Loss	5–7, 6–4, [4–10]

=== Exhibition matches ===
Tournament	Match	Round	Opponent (seed or key)	Rank	Result	Score
Mubadala World Tennis Championship; Abu Dhabi, United Arab Emirates; Exhibition; Hard, outdoor 26–28 December 2013
Mubadala World Tennis Championship; Abu Dhabi, United Arab Emirates; Exhibition; Hard, outdoor 26–28 December 2013	–	QF	Bye			
Mubadala World Tennis Championship; Abu Dhabi, United Arab Emirates; Exhibition; Hard, outdoor 26–28 December 2013	1	SF	(Spain) David Ferrer (3)	3	Loss	4–6, 4–6
Mubadala World Tennis Championship; Abu Dhabi, United Arab Emirates; Exhibition; Hard, outdoor 26–28 December 2013	2	SF-B	(France) Jo-Wilfried Tsonga (6)	10	Win	7–6^{(7–5)}, 6–3

== Tournament schedule ==
=== Singles schedule ===
Nadal's 2014 singles tournament schedule is as follows:

Date	Tournament	Location	Category	Surface^{1}	Outcome 2013	Outcome 2014	Prev. Pts	New Pts^{2}
30 Dec 2013–05 Jan 2014	Qatar Open	Doha, Qatar	ATP World Tour 250	Hard	DNS	**W**	0	250
13 Jan 2014–26 Jan 2014	Australian Open	Melbourne, Australia	Grand Slam	Hard	DNS	F	0	1200
17 Feb 2014–23 Feb 2014	Rio Open	Rio de Janeiro, Brazil	ATP World Tour 500	Clay	-	**W**	0	500
06 Mar 2014–16 Mar 2014	Indian Wells Masters	Indian Wells, United States	ATP World Tour Masters 1000	Hard	**W**	3R	1000	45
19 Mar 2014–30 Mar 2014	Miami Masters	Miami, United States	ATP World Tour Masters 1000	Hard	DNS	F	0	600
13 Apr 2014–20 Apr 2014	Monte-Carlo Masters	Roquebrune-Cap-Martin, France	ATP World Tour Masters 1000	Clay	F	QF	600	180
21 Apr 2014–27 Apr 2014	Barcelona Open	Barcelona, Spain	ATP World Tour 500	Clay	**W**	QF	500	90
4 May 2014 – 11 May 2014	Madrid Open	Madrid, Spain	ATP World Tour Masters 1000	Clay	**W**	**W**	1000	1000
11 May 2014 – 18 May 2014	Italian Open	Rome, Italy	ATP World Tour Masters 1000	Clay	**W**	F	1000	600
25 May 2014–08 Jun 2014	French Open	Paris, France	Grand Slam	Clay	**W**	**W**	2000	2000
09 Jun 2014–15 Jun 2014	Halle Open	Halle, Germany	ATP World Tour 250	Grass	DNS	2R	0	0
23 Jun 2014–06 Jul 2014	Wimbledon Championships	London, United Kingdom	Grand Slam	Grass	1R	4R	10	180
04 Aug 2014–10 Aug 2014	Canadian Open	Toronto, Canada	ATP World Tour Masters 1000	Hard	**W**	DNS	1000	0
10 Aug 2014–17 Aug 2014	Cincinnati Masters	Cincinnati, United States	ATP World Tour Masters 1000	Hard	**W**	DNS	1000	0
25 Aug 2014–07 Sep 2014	US Open	New York City, United States	Grand Slam	Hard	**W**	DNS	2000	0
29 Sep 2014–04 Oct 2014	China Open	Beijing, China	ATP World Tour 500	Hard	F	QF	300	90
05 Oct 2014–12 Oct 2014	Shanghai Masters	Shanghai, China	ATP World Tour Masters 1000	Hard	SF	2R	360	10
18 Oct 2014–26 Oct 2014	Swiss Indoors	Basel, Switzerland	ATP World Tour 500	Hard (i)	DNS		0	
Total							13030	6745 (8105)

^{1} The symbol (i) = indoors means that the respective tournament will be held indoors.

^{2} The ATP numbers between brackets = non-countable tournaments.

=== Head-to-head matchups ===
Ordered by number of wins, then ranking at the time of the most recent match.

Pablo Andújar
- (Czech Republic) Tomáš Berdych 2–0
- (United Kingdom) Andy Murray 2–0
- (Japan) Kei Nishikori 2–0
- (Bulgaria) Grigor Dimitrov 2–0
- (France) Gaël Monfils 2–0
- (Czech Republic) Lukáš Rosol 2–0
- (Germany) Peter Gojowczyk 2–0
- (Serbia) Novak Djokovic 1–2
- (Spain) David Ferrer 1–1
- (Switzerland) Roger Federer 1–0
- (Canada) Milos Raonic 1–0
- (Italy) Fabio Fognini 1–0
- (Russia) Mikhail Youzhny 1–0
- (France) Richard Gasquet 1–0
- (Latvia) Ernests Gulbis 1–0
- (France) Gilles Simon 1–0
- (Ukraine) Alexandr Dolgopolov 1–1
- (Italy) Andreas Seppi 1–0
- (Croatia) Ivan Dodig 1–0
- (Spain) Pablo Andújar 1–0
- (Spain) Roberto Bautista Agut 1–0
- (Australia) Lleyton Hewitt 1–0
- (Portugal) João Sousa 1–0
- (Czech Republic) Radek Štěpánek 1–0
- (Slovakia) Martin Kližan 1–1
- (Argentina) Juan Mónaco 1–0
- (Austria) Dominic Thiem 1–0
- (Finland) Jarkko Nieminen 1–0
- (Uzbekistan) Denis Istomin 1–0
- (Russia) Teymuraz Gabashvili 1–0
- (Australia) Bernard Tomic 1–0
- (Kazakhstan) Mikhail Kukushkin 1–0
- (Argentina) Leonardo Mayer 1–0
- (Germany) Tobias Kamke 1–0
- (Spain) Albert Montañés 1–0
- (Italy) Simone Bolelli 1–0
- (Serbia) Dušan Lajović 1–0
- (Spain) Daniel Gimeno Traver 1–0
- (Spain) Albert Ramos 1–0
- (France) Pierre-Hugues Herbert 1–0
- (United States) Robby Ginepri 1–0
- (Australia) Thanasi Kokkinakis 1–0
- (Switzerland) Stanislas Wawrinka 0–1
- (Spain) Nicolás Almagro 0–1
- (Spain) Feliciano López 0–1
- (Germany) Dustin Brown 0–1
- (Australia) Nick Kyrgios 0–1
- (Croatia) Borna Ćorić 0–1

=== Finals ===
==== Singles: 7 (4–3) ====
Category Grand Slam (1–1) ATP World Tour Finals (0–0) ATP World Tour Masters 1000 (1–2) ATP World Tour 500 (1–0) ATP World Tour 250 (1–0)	Titles by surface Hard (1–2) Clay (3–1) Grass (0–0)	Titles by conditions Outdoors (4–3) Indoors (0–0)

Outcome	No.	Date	Championship	Surface	Opponent in the final	Score in the final
Winner	61	January 5, 2014	Qatar Open, Doha, Qatar	Hard	(France) Gaël Monfils	6–1, 6–7^{(5–7)}, 6–2
Runner-up	26	January 26, 2014	Australian Open, Melbourne, Australia (2)	Hard	(Switzerland) Stanislas Wawrinka	3–6, 2–6, 6–3, 3–6
Winner	62	February 23, 2014	Rio Open, Rio de Janeiro, Brazil	Clay	(Ukraine) Alexandr Dolgopolov	6–3, 7–6^{(7–3)}
Runner-up	27	March 30, 2014	Miami Masters, Miami, United States (4)	Hard	(Serbia) Novak Djokovic	3–6, 3–6
Winner	63	May 11, 2014	Madrid Open, Madrid, Spain (4)	Clay	(Japan) Kei Nishikori	2–6, 6–4, 3–0 ret.
Runner-up	28	May 18, 2014	Italian Open, Rome, Italy (2)	Clay	(Serbia) Novak Djokovic	6–4, 3–6, 3–6
Winner	64	June 8, 2014	French Open, Paris, France (9)	Clay	(Serbia) Novak Djokovic	3–6, 7–5, 6–2, 6–4

=== Earnings ===
- **Bold** font denotes tournament win.

#	Venue	Singles prize money	Year-to-date
1.	**Qatar Open**	**$188,600**	**$188,600**
2.	Australian Open	$1,191,572	$1,380,172
3.	**Rio Open**	**$316,400**	**$1,696,572**
4.	Indian Wells Masters	$28,000	$1,697,572
5.	Miami Masters	$384,065	$2,081,637
6.	Monte-Carlo Masters	€68,890	$2,199,357
7.	Barcelona Open	€38,960	$2,263,337
8.	**Madrid Open**	**€698,720**	**$3,227,472**
9.	Italian Open	€269,150	$3,597,742
10.	**French Open**	**€1,650,000**	**$5,845,702**
11.	Halle Open	€12,340	$5,862,532
12.	Wimbledon	£117,000	$6,061,526
As of July 7, 2014

== See also ==
- 2014 ATP World Tour
- 2014 Novak Djokovic tennis season
- 2014 Roger Federer tennis season
- 2014 Andy Murray tennis season
- 2014 Stan Wawrinka tennis season
