= 2017 Rogers Cup – Men's singles =

Men's singles
- 2017 Rogers Cup

Final
- Champion: (Germany) Alexander Zverev
- Runner-up: (Switzerland) Roger Federer
- Score: 6–3, 6–4

Details
- Draw: 56 (7 Q / 4 WC )
- Seeds: 16

Events
Singles	men	women
Doubles	men	women
← 2016 ·	Rogers Cup	· 2018 →

Alexander Zverev defeated Roger Federer in the final, 6–3, 6–4 to win the men's singles tennis title at the 2017 Canadian Open. Zverev saved three match points en route to the title, in his second-round match against Richard Gasquet.

Novak Djokovic was the reigning champion, but did not participate due to an elbow injury.

As a result of Andy Murray's withdrawal due to a hip injury, Rafael Nadal had a chance to regain the ATP no. 1 singles ranking for the first time since 2014 by reaching the semifinals; however, he lost in the third round to Denis Shapovalov.

== Seeds ==
The top eight seeds received a bye into the second round.

1. (Spain) Rafael Nadal (third round)
2. (Switzerland) Roger Federer (final)
3. (Austria) Dominic Thiem (second round)
4. (Germany) Alexander Zverev (champion)
5. (Japan) Kei Nishikori (second round)
6. (Canada) Milos Raonic (second round)
7. (Bulgaria) Grigor Dimitrov (third round)
8. (France) Jo-Wilfried Tsonga (second round)
9. (Belgium) David Goffin (second round)
10. (Czech Republic) ~~Tomáš Berdych~~ (withdrew)
11. (Spain) Pablo Carreño Busta (second round)
12. (Spain) Roberto Bautista Agut (quarterfinals)
13. (France) Lucas Pouille (first round)
14. (United States) John Isner (first round)
15. (United States) Jack Sock (second round)
16. (Australia) Nick Kyrgios (third round)

== Draw ==
=== Key ===
- Q = Qualifier
- WC = Wild card
- LL = Lucky loser
- Alt = Alternate
- SE = Special exempt
- PR = Protected ranking
- ITF = ITF entry
- JE = Junior exempt
- w/o = Walkover
- r = Retired
- d = Defaulted
- SR = Special ranking

=== Finals ===
Quarterfinals
WC	(Canada) Denis Shapovalov	2	6	6
(France) Adrian Mannarino	6	3	4
4	(Germany) Alexander Zverev	7	6
(South Africa) Kevin Anderson	5	4
(Netherlands) Robin Haase	4	6	6
(Argentina) Diego Schwartzman	6	3	3
12	(Spain) Roberto Bautista Agut	4	4
2	(Switzerland) Roger Federer	6	6

Semifinals
WC	(Canada) Denis Shapovalov	4	5
4	(Germany) Alexander Zverev	6	7
(Netherlands) Robin Haase	3	6^{5}
2	(Switzerland) Roger Federer	6	7^{7}

Final
4	(Germany) Alexander Zverev	6	6
2	(Switzerland) Roger Federer	3	4

=== Top half ===
==== Section 1 ====
First round
(Croatia) B Ćorić	6	6
LL	(Russia) M Youzhny	2	4
WC	(Canada) D Shapovalov	4	7^{10}	6
(Brazil) R Dutra Silva	6	6^{8}	4
(Argentina) JM del Potro	7	7
14	(United States) J Isner	5	5
9	(Belgium) D Goffin	4	6	6
(Japan) Y Sugita	6	1	4
(Spain) F López	1	6	6^{3}
(South Korea) H Chung	6	4	7^{7}
(Russia) D Medvedev	3	1
(France) A Mannarino	6	6

Second round
1	(Spain) R Nadal	6	6
(Croatia) B Ćorić	1	2
WC	(Canada) D Shapovalov	6	7^{7}
(Argentina) JM del Potro	3	6^{4}
9	(Belgium) D Goffin	5	3
(South Korea) H Chung	7	6
(France) A Mannarino	6	6
6	(Canada) M Raonic	4	4

Third round
1	(Spain) R Nadal	6	4	6^{4}
WC	(Canada) D Shapovalov	3	6	7^{7}
(South Korea) H Chung	3	3
(France) A Mannarino	6	6

Quarterfinals
WC	(Canada) D Shapovalov	2	6	6
(France) A Mannarino	6	3	4

==== Section 2 ====
First round
WC	(Canada) B Schnur	6^{5}	7	1
(France) R Gasquet	7^{7}	5	6
(Italy) P Lorenzi	7^{7}	0	6
(United States) F Tiafoe	6^{3}	6	2
(Serbia) V Troicki	1	2
16	(Australia) N Kyrgios	6	6
11	(Spain) P Carreño Busta	3	6	6
(Russia) K Khachanov	6	3	2
(South Africa) K Anderson	6	7^{7}
Q	(Israel) D Sela	3	6^{1}
(United States) S Querrey	4	7^{7}	7
Q	(France) V Millot	6	6^{4}	5

Second round
4	(Germany) A Zverev	6	4	7^{7}
(France) R Gasquet	3	6	6^{3}
(Italy) P Lorenzi	2	3
16	(Australia) N Kyrgios	6	6
11	(Spain) P Carreño Busta	3	6^{6}
(South Africa) K Anderson	6	7^{8}
(United States) S Querrey	6	3	6
8	(France) J-W Tsonga	1	6	4

Third round
4	(Germany) A Zverev	6	6
16	(Australia) N Kyrgios	4	3
(South Africa) K Anderson	6	6
(United States) S Querrey	4	1

Quarterfinals
4	(Germany) A Zverev	7	6
(South Africa) K Anderson	5	4

=== Bottom half ===
==== Section 3 ====
First round
(Germany) M Zverev	6	6^{5}	6
Q	(Slovakia) N Gombos	4	7^{7}	3
(Spain) A Ramos Viñolas	3	3
(Netherlands) R Haase	6	6
(Georgia (country)) N Basilashvili	6^{4}	4
LL	(United States) E Escobedo	7^{7}	6
13	(France) L Pouille	6^{5}	6^{8}
(United States) J Donaldson	7^{7}	7^{10}
(United States) D Young	3	7	4
(France) B Paire	6	5	6
(Argentina) D Schwartzman	6	6^{1}	6
Q	(United States) R Opelka	3	7^{7}	4

Second round
7	(Bulgaria) G Dimitrov	6	3	6
(Germany) M Zverev	3	6	3
(Netherlands) R Haase	6	6
LL	(United States) E Escobedo	4	1
(United States) J Donaldson	6	7
(France) B Paire	2	5
(Argentina) D Schwartzman	6	6^{7}	7
3	(Austria) D Thiem	4	7^{9}	5

Third round
7	(Bulgaria) G Dimitrov	6^{3}	6	1
(Netherlands) R Haase	7^{7}	4	6
(United States) J Donaldson	6	5	5
(Argentina) D Schwartzman	0	7	7

Quarterfinals
(Netherlands) R Haase	4	6	6
(Argentina) D Schwartzman	6	3	3

==== Section 4 ====
First round
(United States) S Johnson	6	6^{1}	1
(France) G Monfils	2	7^{7}	6
Q	(Italy) T Fabbiano	3	5
(United States) R Harrison	6	7
Q	(United States) T Smyczek	6^{4}	1
12	(Spain) R Bautista Agut	7^{7}	6
15	(United States) J Sock	7^{7}	6
Q	(France) P-H Herbert	6^{4}	3
(Spain) D Ferrer	6^{5}	6	6
(United Kingdom) K Edmund	7^{7}	4	3
WC	(Canada) V Pospisil	5	2
WC	(Canada) P Polansky	7	6

Second round
5	(Japan) K Nishikori	7^{7}	5	6^{6}
(France) G Monfils	6^{4}	7	7^{8}
(United States) R Harrison	5	2
12	(Spain) R Bautista Agut	7	6
15	(United States) J Sock	6^{7}	6	1
(Spain) D Ferrer	7^{9}	3	6
WC	(Canada) P Polansky	2	1
2	(Switzerland) R Federer	6	6

Third round
(France) G Monfils	6	6^{5}	6^{2}
12	(Spain) R Bautista Agut	4	7^{7}	7^{7}
(Spain) D Ferrer	6	4	2
2	(Switzerland) R Federer	4	6	6

Quarterfinals
12	(Spain) R Bautista Agut	4	4
2	(Switzerland) R Federer	6	6

== Qualifying ==
=== Seeds ===
1. (France) Pierre-Hugues Herbert (qualified)
2. (Israel) Dudi Sela (qualified)
3. (Cyprus) Marcos Baghdatis (withdrew)
4. (United States) Ernesto Escobedo (qualifying competition, lucky loser)
5. (Slovakia) Norbert Gombos (qualified)
6. (Romania) Marius Copil (first round)
7. (Italy) Thomas Fabbiano (qualified)
8. (Russia) Mikhail Youzhny (qualifying competition, lucky loser)
9. (France) Nicolas Mahut (qualifying competition)
10. (United States) Reilly Opelka (qualified)
11. (Australia) Matthew Ebden (qualifying competition)
12. (France) Vincent Millot (qualified)
13. (United States) Tim Smyczek (qualified)
14. (Republic of Ireland) James McGee (qualifying competition)

=== Qualifiers ===
1. (France) Pierre-Hugues Herbert
2. (Israel) Dudi Sela
3. (France) Vincent Millot
4. (United States) Reilly Opelka
5. (Slovakia) Norbert Gombos
6. (United States) Tim Smyczek
7. (Italy) Thomas Fabbiano

=== Lucky losers ===
1. (Russia) Mikhail Youzhny
2. (United States) Ernesto Escobedo

=== Qualifying draw ===
==== First qualifier ====
First round
1	(France) Pierre-Hugues Herbert	6	6
(Australia) Luke Saville	3	3
(South Africa) Lloyd Harris	6^{4}	7^{7}	6^{5}
8	(Russia) Mikhail Youzhny	7^{7}	6^{4}	7^{7}

Qualifying competition
1	(France) Pierre-Hugues Herbert	6	2	6
8	(Russia) Mikhail Youzhny	2	6	3

==== Second qualifier ====
First round
2	(Israel) Dudi Sela	7	6
Alt	(Canada) Samuel Monette	5	3
WC	(Canada) Benjamin Sigouin	3	1
11	(Australia) Matthew Ebden	6	6

Qualifying competition
2	(Israel) Dudi Sela	6	7^{9}
11	(Australia) Matthew Ebden	3	6^{7}

==== Third qualifier ====
First round
Alt	(Canada) Antoine Leduc	0	3
(United Kingdom) Brydan Klein	6	6
(Canada) Filip Peliwo	6^{5}	1
12	(France) Vincent Millot	7^{7}	6

Qualifying competition
(United Kingdom) Brydan Klein	6^{3}	6^{4}
12	(France) Vincent Millot	7^{7}	7^{7}

==== Fourth qualifier ====
First round
4	(United States) Ernesto Escobedo	2	6	7^{7}
(United States) Christian Harrison	6	3	6^{1}
WC	(Canada) Kelsey Stevenson	4	3
10	(United States) Reilly Opelka	6	6

Qualifying competition
4	(United States) Ernesto Escobedo	2	3
10	(United States) Reilly Opelka	6	6

==== Fifth qualifier ====
First round
5	(Slovakia) Norbert Gombos	6	6^{1}	6
Alt	(Canada) Raheel Manji	3	7^{7}	1
WC	(Canada) Philip Bester	6^{2}	3
14	(Republic of Ireland) James McGee	7^{7}	6

Qualifying competition
5	(Slovakia) Norbert Gombos	6	6
14	(Republic of Ireland) James McGee	4	4

==== Sixth qualifier ====
First round
6	(Romania) Marius Copil	6^{3}	3
WC	(Canada) Frank Dancevic	7^{7}	6
Alt	(Canada) Pavel Krainik	0	4
13	(United States) Tim Smyczek	6	6

Qualifying competition
WC	(Canada) Frank Dancevic	7^{7}	2	2
13	(United States) Tim Smyczek	6^{1}	6	6

==== Seventh qualifier ====
First round
7	(Italy) Thomas Fabbiano	7	3	6
(Poland) Hubert Hurkacz	5	6	4
(Australia) Andrew Whittington	5	6^{3}
9	(France) Nicolas Mahut	7	7^{7}

Qualifying competition
7	(Italy) Thomas Fabbiano	6	7
9	(France) Nicolas Mahut	2	5
