= 2015 Rio Open – Women's singles =

Women's singles
- 2015 Rio Open

Final
- Champion: (Italy) Sara Errani
- Runner-up: (Slovakia) Anna Karolína Schmiedlová
- Score: 7–6^{(7–2)}, 6–1

Events
Singles	men	women
Doubles	men	women
- Rio Open

Kurumi Nara was the defending champion, but chose to compete in Dubai instead.

Sara Errani won the title, defeating Anna Karolína Schmiedlová in the final. She saved three match points against Beatriz Haddad Maia in the second set in their quarterfinal match.

== Seeds ==
1. (Italy) Sara Errani (champion)
2. (Romania) Irina-Camelia Begu (semifinals)
3. (Italy) Roberta Vinci (second round)
4. (United States) Madison Brengle (second round)
5. (Sweden) Johanna Larsson (semifinals)
6. (Slovakia) Anna Karolína Schmiedlová (final)
7. (Slovenia) Polona Hercog (second round)
8. (South Africa) Chanelle Scheepers (first round)

== Draw ==
Key

- Q = Qualifier
- WC = Wild card
- LL = Lucky loser
- Alt = Alternate
- ITF = ITF entry
- PR = Protected ranking
- SR = Special ranking
- SE = Special exempt
- JE = Junior exempt
- JR = Junior Accelerator Programme entrant
- CO = College Accelerator Programme entrant
- NG = Next Gen Accelerator Program entrant
- w/o = Walkover
- r = Retired
- d = Defaulted

=== Finals ===
Semifinals
1	(Italy) Sara Errani	7	6
5	(Sweden) Johanna Larsson	5	3
6	(Slovakia) Anna Karolína Schmiedlová	6	4	6
2	(Romania) Irina-Camelia Begu	3	6	2

Final
1	(Italy) Sara Errani	7^{7}	6
6	(Slovakia) Anna Karolína Schmiedlová	6^{2}	1

=== Top half ===
First round
1	(Italy) S Errani	6	6
(Brazil) T Pereira	3	3
Q	(Paraguay) M González	2	2
(Spain) L Domínguez Lino	6	6
Q	(Argentina) M Irigoyen	1	1
WC	(Brazil) B Haddad Maia	6	6
(Belgium) A-S Mestach	3	4
7	(Slovenia) P Hercog	6	6
4	(United States) M Brengle	6	3
Q	(Romania) A Bogdan	4	3^{r}
(Germany) D Pfizenmaier	6^{5}	6	6
Q	(Spain) E Cabeza Candela	7^{7}	4	4
(France) P Parmentier	2	7^{7}	0
WC	(Brazil) G Cé	6	6^{1}	6
(Spain) MT Torró Flor	7^{7}	6^{3}	2^{r}
5	(Sweden) J Larsson	6^{5}	7^{7}	4

Second round
1	(Italy) S Errani	6	7
(Spain) L Domínguez Lino	0	5
WC	(Brazil) B Haddad Maia	6	6
7	(Slovenia) P Hercog	1	2
4	(United States) M Brengle	5	6	5
(Germany) D Pfizenmaier	7	0	7
WC	(Brazil) G Cé	6^{4}	4
5	(Sweden) J Larsson	7^{7}	6

Quarterfinals
1	(Italy) S Errani	3	7^{7}	3
WC	(Brazil) B Haddad Maia	6	6^{2}	0^{r}
(Germany) D Pfizenmaier	4	0
5	(Sweden) J Larsson	6	6

Semifinals
1	(Italy) S Errani	7	6
5	(Sweden) J Larsson	5	3

=== Bottom half ===
First round
6	(Slovakia) AK Schmiedlová	6	6
(Belgium) A Van Uytvanck	3	0
(Argentina) P Ormaechea	6	6
Q	(Spain) S Sorribes Tormo	4	4
Q	(Paraguay) V Cepede Royg	6	7
WC	(Brazil) PC Gonçalves	2	5
(Czech Republic) L Hradecká	6^{4}	3
3	(Italy) R Vinci	7^{7}	6
8	(South Africa) C Scheepers	2	1
(United States) G Min	6	6
(Romania) A Mitu	7^{7}	3	4
(Israel) J Glushko	6^{5}	6	6
(United States) B Mattek-Sands	6	6
(Montenegro) D Kovinić	4	3
(Australia) O Rogowska	1	3
2	(Romania) I-C Begu	6	6

Second round
6	(Slovakia) AK Schmiedlová	6	6
(Argentina) P Ormaechea	0	2
Q	(Paraguay) V Cepede Royg	6	6
3	(Italy) R Vinci	2	3
(United States) G Min	3	1
(Israel) J Glushko	6	6
(United States) B Mattek-Sands	2	4
2	(Romania) I-C Begu	6	6

Quarterfinals
6	(Slovakia) AK Schmiedlová	6	6
Q	(Paraguay) V Cepede Royg	3	1
(Israel) J Glushko	1	2
2	(Romania) I-C Begu	6	6

Semifinals
6	(Slovakia) AK Schmiedlová	6	4	6
2	(Romania) I-C Begu	3	6	2

== Qualifying ==
=== Seeds ===
1. (Croatia) Petra Martić (first round; retired)
2. (Paraguay) Verónica Cepede Royg (qualified)
3. (Liechtenstein) Stephanie Vogt (first round)
4. (Bulgaria) Elitsa Kostova (first round)
5. (Argentina) María Irigoyen (qualified)
6. (Romania) Ana Bogdan (qualified)
7. (Belgium) Ysaline Bonaventure (qualifying competition)
8. (Peru) Bianca Botto (qualifying competition; retired)
9. (Spain) Sara Sorribes Tormo (qualified)
10. (Argentina) Florencia Molinero (qualifying competition)
11. (Sweden) Rebecca Peterson (qualifying competition)
12. (Spain) Beatriz García Vidagany (qualifying competition)

=== Qualifiers ===
1. (Spain) Estrella Cabeza Candela
2. (Paraguay) Verónica Cepede Royg
3. (Spain) Sara Sorribes Tormo
4. (Paraguay) Montserrat González
5. (Argentina) María Irigoyen
6. (Romania) Ana Bogdan

=== Draw ===
==== First qualifier ====
First round
1	(Croatia) Petra Martić	6	2^{r}
(Spain) Estrella Cabeza Candela	2	1
WC	(Brazil) Carolina Alves	4	4
8	(Peru) Bianca Botto	6	6

Qualifying competition
(Spain) Estrella Cabeza Candela	6	3
8	(Peru) Bianca Botto	4	1^{r}

==== Second qualifier ====
First round
2	(Paraguay) Verónica Cepede Royg	6	6
WC	(Brazil) Ingrid Gamarra Martins	0	3
(Sweden) Ellen Allgurin	6	3	2
11	(Sweden) Rebecca Peterson	4	6	6

Qualifying competition
2	(Paraguay) Verónica Cepede Royg	4	7^{7}	6
11	(Sweden) Rebecca Peterson	6	6^{4}	3

==== Third qualifier ====
First round
3	(Liechtenstein) Stephanie Vogt	1	5
(Italy) Gaia Sanesi	6	7
(Venezuela) Andrea Gámiz	3	6^{5}
9	(Spain) Sara Sorribes Tormo	6	7^{7}

Qualifying competition
(Italy) Gaia Sanesi	2	0
9	(Spain) Sara Sorribes Tormo	6	6

==== Fourth qualifier ====
First round
4	(Bulgaria) Elitsa Kostova	6^{5}	6	2
(Paraguay) Montserrat González	7^{7}	2	6
(Colombia) Yuliana Lizarazo	2	2
12	(Spain) Beatriz García Vidagany	6	6

Qualifying competition
(Paraguay) Montserrat González	6	6
12	(Spain) Beatriz García Vidagany	4	2

==== Fifth qualifier ====
First round
5	(Argentina) María Irigoyen	7^{7}	6
(Greece) Maria Sakkari	6^{3}	2
WC	(Brazil) Eduarda Piai	1	1
10	(Argentina) Florencia Molinero	6	6

Qualifying competition
5	(Argentina) María Irigoyen	6	2	6
10	(Argentina) Florencia Molinero	3	6	2

==== Sixth qualifier ====
First round
6	(Romania) Ana Bogdan	6	6
(Chinese Taipei) Hsu Chieh-yu	3	3
WC	(Brazil) Laura Pigossi	4	3
7	(Belgium) Ysaline Bonaventure	6	6

Qualifying competition
6	(Romania) Ana Bogdan	6	3	6
7	(Belgium) Ysaline Bonaventure	3	6	1
