= 2014 Rio Open – Women's doubles =

Women's doubles
- 2014 Rio Open

Final
- Champions: (Romania) Irina-Camelia Begu (Argentina) María Irigoyen
- Runners-up: (Sweden) Johanna Larsson (South Africa) Chanelle Scheepers
- Score: 6–2, 6–0

Events
Singles	men	women
Doubles	men	women
Rio Open	· 2015 →

This was the first edition of the event. Irina-Camelia Begu and María Irigoyen won the title, defeating Johanna Larsson and Chanelle Scheepers in the final, 6–2, 6–0.

== Seeds ==
1. (Czech Republic) Barbora Záhlavová-Strýcová / (Czech Republic) Klára Zakopalová (semifinals)
2. (Croatia) Darija Jurak / (Slovenia) Andreja Klepač (first round)
3. (Hungary) Tímea Babos / (Australia) Jarmila Gajdošová (quarterfinals)
4. (Ukraine) Irina Buryachok / (Poland) Katarzyna Piter (first round)

== Draw ==
=== Key ===
- Q = Qualifier
- WC = Wild card
- LL = Lucky loser
- Alt = Alternate
- SE = Special exempt
- PR = Protected ranking
- ITF = ITF entry
- JE = Junior exempt
- w/o = Walkover
- r = Retired
- d = Defaulted
- SR = Special ranking

=== Draw ===
First round
1	(Czech Republic) B Záhlavová-Strýcová (Czech Republic) K Zakopalová	6	6
(Chinese Taipei) S-y Hsieh (Chinese Taipei) S-w Hsieh	0	2
WC	(Brazil) MF Alves (Brazil) B Haddad Maia	2	1
(Ukraine) L Kichenok (Ukraine) N Kichenok	6	6
3	(Hungary) T Babos (Australia) J Gajdošová	6	6
(Argentina) F Molinero (France) L Thorpe	2	0
(Romania) I-C Begu (Argentina) M Irigoyen	7	6
(Romania) A Cadanțu (Spain) S Soler Espinosa	5	1
WC	(Brazil) PC Gonçalves (Brazil) L Pigossi	3	3
(Poland) P Kania (Russia) V Solovyeva	6	6
(Spain) L Domínguez Lino (Colombia) M Duque Mariño	3	6	[10]
4	(Ukraine) I Buryachok (Poland) K Piter	6	1	[8]
(Australia) M Adamczak (Liechtenstein) S Vogt	2	6^{4}
(Romania) R Olaru (Russia) A Panova	6	7^{7}
(Sweden) J Larsson (South Africa) C Scheepers	6	6
2	(Croatia) D Jurak (Slovenia) A Klepač	0	3

Quarterfinals
1	(Czech Republic) B Záhlavová-Strýcová (Czech Republic) K Zakopalová	6	6
(Ukraine) L Kichenok (Ukraine) N Kichenok	3	2
3	(Hungary) T Babos (Australia) J Gajdošová	4	5
(Romania) I-C Begu (Argentina) M Irigoyen	6	7
(Poland) P Kania (Russia) V Solovyeva	4	6	[4]
(Spain) L Domínguez Lino (Colombia) M Duque Mariño	6	3	[10]
(Romania) R Olaru (Russia) A Panova	6	2	[3]
(Sweden) J Larsson (South Africa) C Scheepers	4	6	[10]

Semifinals
1	(Czech Republic) B Záhlavová-Strýcová (Czech Republic) K Zakopalová	2	7^{7}	[8]
(Romania) I-C Begu (Argentina) M Irigoyen	6	6^{5}	[10]
(Spain) L Domínguez Lino (Colombia) M Duque Mariño
(Sweden) J Larsson (South Africa) C Scheepers	w/o

Final
(Romania) I-C Begu (Argentina) M Irigoyen	6	6
(Sweden) J Larsson (South Africa) C Scheepers	2	0
