= 2014 Rio Open – Women's singles =

Women's singles
- 2014 Rio Open

Final
- Champion: (Japan) Kurumi Nara
- Runner-up: (Czech Republic) Klára Zakopalová
- Score: 6–1, 4–6, 6–1

Events
Singles	men	women
Doubles	men	women
- Rio Open

This was the first edition of the event. Kurumi Nara won the title, defeating Klára Zakopalová in the final, 6–1, 4–6, 6–1. It was her first WTA Tour singles title.

== Seeds ==
1. (Czech Republic) Klára Zakopalová (final)
2. (Italy) Francesca Schiavone (first round)
3. (Argentina) Paula Ormaechea (quarterfinals)
4. (Romania) Alexandra Cadanțu (first round)
5. (Japan) Kurumi Nara (champion)
6. (Spain) María Teresa Torró Flor (first round)
7. (Czech Republic) Barbora Záhlavová-Strýcová (first round)
8. (United States) Vania King (first round)

== Draw ==
Key

- Q = Qualifier
- WC = Wild card
- LL = Lucky loser
- Alt = Alternate
- ITF = ITF entry
- PR = Protected ranking
- SR = Special ranking
- SE = Special exempt
- JE = Junior exempt
- JR = Junior Accelerator Programme entrant
- CO = College Accelerator Programme entrant
- NG = Next Gen Accelerator Program entrant
- w/o = Walkover
- r = Retired
- d = Defaulted

=== Finals ===
Semifinals
1	(Czech Republic) Klára Zakopalová	6	6
(Brazil) Teliana Pereira	2	1
Q	(Italy) Nastassja Burnett	4	6	2
5	(Japan) Kurumi Nara	6	3	6

Final
1	(Czech Republic) Klára Zakopalová	1	6	1
5	(Japan) Kurumi Nara	6	4	6

=== Top half ===
First round
1	(Czech Republic) K Zakopalová	6	6
(Colombia) M Duque Mariño	4	4
(Spain) S Soler Espinosa	6	6
WC	(Brazil) L Pigossi	0	1
(Poland) K Piter	6	6
WC	(Brazil) B Haddad Maia	3	3
(Germany) D Pfizenmaier	2	6	6
7	(Czech Republic) B Záhlavová-Strýcová	6	4	3
4	(Romania) A Cadanțu	3	4
(Brazil) T Pereira	6	6
(Kazakhstan) Y Shvedova	4	3
(Austria) P Mayr-Achleitner	6	6
Q	(Paraguay) V Cepede Royg	7	7^{10}
WC	(Brazil) PC Gonçalves	5	6^{8}
Q	(Romania) I-C Begu	6	6
8	(United States) V King	4	0

Second round
1	(Czech Republic) K Zakopalová	6	6
(Spain) S Soler Espinosa	4	1
(Poland) K Piter	5	6	6
(Germany) D Pfizenmaier	7	3	1
(Brazil) T Pereira	6	7^{7}
(Austria) P Mayr-Achleitner	2	6^{5}
Q	(Paraguay) V Cepede Royg	3	7	1
Q	(Romania) I-C Begu	6	5	6

Quarterfinals
1	(Czech Republic) K Zakopalová	6	6
(Poland) K Piter	4	0
(Brazil) T Pereira	6	6
Q	(Romania) I-C Begu	4	4

Semifinals
1	(Czech Republic) K Zakopalová	6	6
(Brazil) T Pereira	2	1

=== Bottom half ===
First round
6	(Spain) MT Torró Flor	5	4
Q	(Italy) N Burnett	7	6
(Sweden) J Larsson	4	3
Q	(Belgium) A Van Uytvanck	6	6
Q	(Montenegro) D Kovinić	5	0
(Netherlands) K Bertens	7	6
Q	(United States) N Gibbs	2	1
3	(Argentina) P Ormaechea	6	6
5	(Japan) K Nara	6	6
(Chinese Taipei) S-w Hsieh	3	2
(Germany) A-L Friedsam	6	6
(Ukraine) N Kichenok	2	3
(Hungary) T Babos	6	3	2
(South Africa) C Scheepers	2	6	6
(Spain) L Domínguez Lino	6	6
2	(Italy) F Schiavone	4	4

Second round
Q	(Italy) N Burnett	0	6	6
Q	(Belgium) A Van Uytvanck	6	3	2
(Netherlands) K Bertens	5	5
3	(Argentina) P Ormaechea	7	7
5	(Japan) K Nara	6	7^{7}
(Germany) A-L Friedsam	0	6^{3}
(South Africa) C Scheepers	6	6^{7}	1
(Spain) L Domínguez Lino	2	7^{9}	6

Quarterfinals
Q	(Italy) N Burnett	5	6	7
3	(Argentina) P Ormaechea	7	2	5
5	(Japan) K Nara	7^{7}	2
(Spain) L Domínguez Lino	6^{5}	0^{r}

Semifinals
Q	(Italy) N Burnett	4	6	2
5	(Japan) K Nara	6	3	6

== Qualifying ==
=== Seeds ===
1. (Israel) Julia Glushko (qualifying competition)
2. (Belgium) Alison Van Uytvanck (qualified)
3. (Belgium) An-Sophie Mestach (qualifying competition)
4. (Russia) Alexandra Panova (qualifying competition)
5. (Kazakhstan) Sesil Karatantcheva (first round)
6. (Romania) Irina-Camelia Begu (qualified)
7. (France) Alizé Lim (first round)
8. (Netherlands) Arantxa Rus (first round)
9. (Montenegro) Danka Kovinić (qualified)
10. (Italy) Nastassja Burnett (qualified)
11. (Switzerland) Viktorija Golubic (first round)
12. (Poland) Paula Kania (first round)

=== Qualifiers ===
1. (Italy) Nastassja Burnett
2. (Belgium) Alison Van Uytvanck
3. (United States) Nicole Gibbs
4. (Montenegro) Danka Kovinić
5. (Paraguay) Verónica Cepede Royg
6. (Romania) Irina-Camelia Begu

=== Draw ===
==== First qualifier ====
First round
1	(Israel) Julia Glushko	6^{4}	6	6
WC	(Brazil) Luisa Stefani	7^{7}	4	1
(Japan) Risa Ozaki	4	4
10	(Italy) Nastassja Burnett	6	6

Qualifying competition
1	(Israel) Julia Glushko	6	3	1
10	(Italy) Nastassja Burnett	4	6	6

==== Second qualifier ====
First round
2	(Belgium) Alison Van Uytvanck	6	6
WC	(Brazil) Ingrid Gamarra Martins	1	1
(Austria) Melanie Klaffner	7^{7}	7^{8}
8	(Netherlands) Arantxa Rus	6^{1}	6^{6}

Qualifying competition
2	(Belgium) Alison Van Uytvanck	6	6
(Austria) Melanie Klaffner	1	4

==== Third qualifier ====
First round
3	(Belgium) An-Sophie Mestach	7^{11}	6
(Argentina) Florencia Molinero	6^{9}	3
(United States) Nicole Gibbs	6	6
7	(France) Alizé Lim	4	4

Qualifying competition
3	(Belgium) An-Sophie Mestach	6^{6}	5
(United States) Nicole Gibbs	7^{8}	7

==== Fourth qualifier ====
First round
4	(Russia) Alexandra Panova	6	4	6
WC	(Brazil) Ana Clara Duarte	2	6	1
PR	(Australia) Jarmila Gajdošová	3	6^{4}
9	(Montenegro) Danka Kovinić	6	7^{7}

Qualifying competition
4	(Russia) Alexandra Panova	4	6	1
9	(Montenegro) Danka Kovinić	6	3	6

==== Fifth qualifier ====
First round
5	(Kazakhstan) Sesil Karatantcheva	5	2
(Paraguay) Verónica Cepede Royg	7	6
(Argentina) María Irigoyen	4	6	6
11	(Switzerland) Viktorija Golubic	6	4	4

Qualifying competition
(Paraguay) Verónica Cepede Royg	6	6
(Argentina) María Irigoyen	2	2

==== Sixth qualifier ====
First round
6	(Romania) Irina-Camelia Begu	6	6
(Venezuela) Adriana Pérez	3	1
WC	(Brazil) Gabriela Cé	6	2	7
12	(Poland) Paula Kania	3	6	5

Qualifying competition
6	(Romania) Irina-Camelia Begu	6	2	6
WC	(Brazil) Gabriela Cé	3	6	2
