= 2015 Rio Open =

- Date: 16–22 February
- Edition: 2nd
- Category: ATP World Tour 500; WTA International
- Draw: 32S / 16D
- Prize money: $1,548,755 (ATP) $250,000 (WTA)
- Surface: Clay
- Location: Rio de Janeiro, Brazil
- Venue: Jockey Club Brasileiro

Champions

Men's singles
- (Spain) David Ferrer

Women's singles
- (Italy) Sara Errani

Men's doubles
- (Slovakia) Martin Kližan / (Austria) Philipp Oswald

Women's doubles
- (Belgium) Ysaline Bonaventure / (Sweden) Rebecca Peterson
← 2014 ·	Rio Open	· 2016 →

The 2015 Rio Open was a professional tennis tournament played on outdoor clay courts. It was the 2nd edition of the tournament, and part of the 2015 ATP World Tour and the 2015 WTA Tour. It took place in Rio de Janeiro, Brazil between 16 February and 22 February 2015.

== Points and prize money ==
=== Point distribution ===
Event	W	F	SF	QF	Round of 16	Round of 32	Q	Q3	Q2	Q1
Men's singles	500	300	180	90	45	0	20	—	10	0
Men's doubles	500	300	180	90	—	—	20	—	10	0
Women's singles	280	180	110	60	30	1	18	14	10	1
Women's doubles	280	180	110	60	1	—	—	—	—	—

=== Prize money ===
Event	W	F	SF	QF	Round of 16	Round of 32^{1}	Q3	Q2	Q1
Men's singles	$343,000	$154,620	$73,240	$35,340	$18,020	$9,910	$1,115	$615	—
Men's doubles *	$101,310	$45,710	$21,550	$10,420	$5,350	—	—	—	—
Women's singles	$43,000	$21,400	$11,300	$5,900	$3,310	$1,925	$1,005	$730	$530
Women's doubles *	$12,300	$6,400	$3,435	$1,820	$960	—	—	—	—
Doubles prize money per team

_{^{1} Qualifiers prize money is also the Round of 32 prize money}

== ATP singles main-draw entrants ==
=== Seeds ===
Country	Player	Ranking^{1}	Seed
ESP	Rafael Nadal	3	1
ESP	David Ferrer	9	2
ESP	Tommy Robredo	17	3
ITA	Fabio Fognini	26	4
ARG	Leonardo Mayer	30	5
URU	Pablo Cuevas	32	6
COL	Santiago Giraldo	33	7
SVK	Martin Kližan	38	8

- ^{1} Rankings as of February 9, 2015.

=== Other entrants ===
The following players received wildcards into the main draw:

- (Brazil) Guilherme Clezar
- (Brazil) João Souza
- (Sweden) Elias Ymer

The following players received entry from the qualifying draw:

- (Argentina) Facundo Argüello
- (Italy) Marco Cecchinato
- (Netherlands) Thiemo de Bakker
- (Spain) Daniel Gimeno Traver

=== Withdrawals ===
Before the tournament

- (Spain) Marcel Granollers → replaced by (Spain) Albert Montañés

=== Retirements ===
- (Netherlands) Thiemo de Bakker (stomach pain)
- (Colombia) Santiago Giraldo (dehydration)
- (Argentina) Leonardo Mayer (dehydration)
- (Argentina) Diego Schwartzman (cramping)

== ATP doubles main-draw entrants ==
=== Seeds ===
Country	Player	Country	Player	Rank^{1}	Seed
AUT	Alexander Peya	BRA	Bruno Soares	22	1
COL	Juan Sebastián Cabal	COL	Robert Farah	42	2
AUT	Julian Knowle	BRA	Marcelo Melo	48	3
URU	Pablo Cuevas	ESP	David Marrero	68	4

- ^{1} Rankings as of February 9, 2015.

=== Other entrants ===
The following pairs received wildcards into the main draw:

- (Brazil) Fabiano de Paula / (Brazil) Marcelo Demoliner
- (Brazil) André Sá / (Brazil) João Souza

=== Withdrawals ===
During the tournament

- (Spain) David Marrero (illness)

== WTA singles main-draw entrants ==
=== Seeds ===
Country	Player	Ranking^{1}	Seed
ITA	Sara Errani	13	1
ROU	Irina-Camelia Begu	34	2
ITA	Roberta Vinci	40	3
USA	Madison Brengle	46	4
SWE	Johanna Larsson	71	5
SVK	Anna Karolína Schmiedlová	75	6
SLO	Polona Hercog	76	7
RSA	Chanelle Scheepers	83	8

- ^{1} Rankings as of February 9, 2015

=== Other entrants ===
The following players received wildcards into the main draw:

- (Brazil) Gabriela Cé
- (Brazil) Paula Cristina Gonçalves
- (Brazil) Beatriz Haddad Maia

The following players received entry from the qualifying draw:

- (Romania) Ana Bogdan
- (Spain) Estrella Cabeza Candela
- (Paraguay) Verónica Cepede Royg
- (Paraguay) Montserrat González
- (Argentina) María Irigoyen
- (Spain) Sara Sorribes Tormo

=== Withdrawals ===
Before the tournament

- (Slovakia) Jana Čepelová → replaced by (Romania) Andreea Mitu
- (Romania) Sorana Cîrstea → replaced by (Australia) Olivia Rogowska
- (United States) Nicole Gibbs → replaced by (Argentina) Paula Ormaechea
- (United States) Christina McHale → replaced by (Brazil) Teliana Pereira
- (Spain) Sílvia Soler Espinosa → replaced by (Czech Republic) Lucie Hradecká

=== Retirements ===
- (Romania) Ana Bogdan (heat illness)
- (Brazil) Beatriz Haddad Maia (cramping)
- (Spain) María Teresa Torró Flor (left thigh injury)

== WTA doubles main-draw entrants ==
=== Seeds ===
Country	Player	Country	Player	Rank^{1}	Seed
ROU	Irina-Camelia Begu	ARG	María Irigoyen	135	1
TPE	Chan Chin-wei	ROU	Raluca Olaru	141	2
GBR	Jocelyn Rae	GBR	Anna Smith	192	3
ARG	Florencia Molinero	LIE	Stephanie Vogt	216	4

- ^{1} Rankings as of February 9, 2015.

=== Other entrants ===
The following pair received entry as alternates:

- (Spain) Estrella Cabeza Candela / (Italy) Gaia Sanesi

=== Withdrawals ===
Before the tournament

- (Spain) María Teresa Torró Flor (left thigh injury)

During the tournament

- (Brazil) Beatriz Haddad Maia

=== Retirements ===
- (Romania) Irina-Camelia Begu (right rib injury)

== Finals ==
=== Men's singles ===
- (Spain) David Ferrer defeated (Italy) Fabio Fognini, 6–2, 6–3

=== Women's singles ===
- (Italy) Sara Errani defeated (Slovakia) Anna Karolína Schmiedlová, 7–6^{(7–2)}, 6–1

=== Men's doubles ===
- (Slovakia) Martin Kližan / (Austria) Philipp Oswald defeated (Spain) Pablo Andújar / (Austria) Oliver Marach, 7–6^{(7–3)}, 6–4

=== Women's doubles ===
- (Belgium) Ysaline Bonaventure / (Sweden) Rebecca Peterson defeated (Romania) Irina-Camelia Begu / (Argentina) María Irigoyen, 3–0, retired.
