= 2015 Rio Open – Men's doubles =

Men's doubles
- 2015 Rio Open

Final
- Champions: (Slovakia) Martin Kližan (Austria) Philipp Oswald
- Runners-up: (Spain) Pablo Andújar (Austria) Oliver Marach
- Score: 7–6^{(7–3)}, 6–4

Details
- Draw: 16
- Seeds: 4

Events
Singles	men	women
Doubles	men	women
← 2014 ·	Rio Open	· 2016 →

Juan Sebastián Cabal and Robert Farah were defending champions, but lost to Martin Kližan and Philipp Oswald in the semifinals.
Kližan and Oswald went on to win the title, defeating Pablo Andújar and Oliver Marach in the final, 7–6^{(7–3)}, 6–4.

== Seeds ==
1. (Austria) Alexander Peya / (Brazil) Bruno Soares (semifinals)
2. (Colombia) Juan Sebastián Cabal / (Colombia) Robert Farah (semifinals)
3. (Austria) Julian Knowle / (Brazil) Marcelo Melo (first round)
4. (Uruguay) Pablo Cuevas / (Spain) David Marrero (quarterfinals, withdrew)

== Draw ==
=== Key ===
- Q = Qualifier
- WC = Wild card
- LL = Lucky loser
- Alt = Alternate
- SE = Special exempt
- PR = Protected ranking
- ITF = ITF entry
- JE = Junior exempt
- w/o = Walkover
- r = Retired
- d = Defaulted
- SR = Special ranking

=== Draw ===
First round
1	(Austria) A Peya (Brazil) B Soares	7^{7}	6
(Sweden) J Brunström (United States) N Monroe	6^{4}	4
(Spain) P Carreño Busta (Argentina) F Delbonis	3	3
(Italy) P Lorenzi (Argentina) D Schwartzman	6	6
3	(Austria) J Knowle (Brazil) M Melo	0	3
(Spain) P Andújar (Austria) O Marach	6	6
WC	(Brazil) A Sá (Brazil) J Souza	7	6
(Argentina) M González (Argentina) J Mónaco	5	0
WC	(Brazil) F de Paula (Brazil) M Demoliner	6	3	[5]
(Slovakia) M Kližan (Austria) P Oswald	4	6	[10]
(Czech Republic) F Čermák (Czech Republic) J Veselý	2	1
4	(Uruguay) P Cuevas (Spain) D Marrero	6	6
(Argentina) C Berlocq (Argentina) L Mayer	6	6
(Spain) N Almagro (Italy) F Fognini	4	3
(Colombia) S Giraldo (Spain) A Ramos-Viñolas	4	3
2	(Colombia) JS Cabal (Colombia) R Farah	6	6

Quarterfinals
1	(Austria) A Peya (Brazil) B Soares	7	6
(Italy) P Lorenzi (Argentina) D Schwartzman	5	1
(Spain) P Andújar (Austria) O Marach	6	6
WC	(Brazil) A Sá (Brazil) J Souza	3	2
(Slovakia) M Kližan (Austria) P Oswald	w/o
4	(Uruguay) P Cuevas (Spain) D Marrero
(Argentina) C Berlocq (Argentina) L Mayer	1	6	[7]
2	(Colombia) JS Cabal (Colombia) R Farah	6	3	[10]

Semifinals
1	(Austria) A Peya (Brazil) B Soares	1	6	[7]
(Spain) P Andújar (Austria) O Marach	6	4	[10]
(Slovakia) M Kližan (Austria) P Oswald	3	7^{8}	[10]
2	(Colombia) JS Cabal (Colombia) R Farah	6	6^{6}	[7]

Final
(Spain) P Andújar (Austria) O Marach	6^{3}	4
(Slovakia) M Kližan (Austria) P Oswald	7^{7}	6
