= 2015 Rio Open – Men's singles =

Men's singles
- 2015 Rio Open

Final
- Champion: (Spain) David Ferrer
- Runner-up: (Italy) Fabio Fognini
- Score: 6–2, 6–3

Details
- Draw: 32 (4 Q / 3 WC )
- Seeds: 8

Events
Singles	men	women
Doubles	men	women
- Rio Open

Rafael Nadal was the defending champion, but lost in the semifinals to Fabio Fognini.

David Ferrer won the title, defeating Fognini in the final, 6–2, 6–3.

== Seeds ==
1. (Spain) Rafael Nadal (semifinals)
2. (Spain) David Ferrer (champion)
3. (Spain) Tommy Robredo (second round)
4. (Italy) Fabio Fognini (final)

5. (Argentina) Leonardo Mayer (first round, retired)
6. (Uruguay) Pablo Cuevas (quarterfinals)
7. (Colombia) Santiago Giraldo (first round, retired)
8. (Slovakia) Martin Kližan (second round)

== Draw ==
Key

- Q = Qualifier
- WC = Wild card
- LL = Lucky loser
- Alt = Alternate
- ITF = ITF entry
- PR = Protected ranking
- SR = Special ranking
- SE = Special exempt
- JE = Junior exempt
- JR = Junior Accelerator Programme entrant
- CO = College Accelerator Programme entrant
- NG = Next Gen Accelerator Program entrant
- w/o = Walkover
- r = Retired
- d = Defaulted

=== Finals ===
Semifinals
1	(Spain) Rafael Nadal	6	2	5
4	(Italy) Fabio Fognini	1	6	7
(Austria) Andreas Haider-Maurer	5	1
2	(Spain) David Ferrer	7	6

Final
4	(Italy) Fabio Fognini	2	3
2	(Spain) David Ferrer	6	6

=== Top half ===
First round
1	(Spain) R Nadal	6	6
(Brazil) T Bellucci	4	1
(Spain) P Carreño Busta	6	6^{3}	6
(Argentina) C Berlocq	3	7^{7}	0
(Argentina) M González	6	4	0
(Spain) A Montañés	4	6	6
(Spain) N Almagro	6	3	4
6	(Uruguay) P Cuevas	4	6	6
4	(Italy) F Fognini	1	7^{9}	6
(Czech Republic) J Veselý	6	6^{7}	1
(Spain) P Andújar	3	6	6
(Italy) P Lorenzi	6	0	3
(Argentina) F Delbonis	6^{8}	7^{8}	2
(Argentina) D Schwartzman	7^{10}	6^{6}	1^{r}
(Serbia) D Lajović	4	6	4
8	(Slovakia) M Kližan	6	0	6

Second round
1	(Spain) R Nadal	7	6
(Spain) P Carreño Busta	5	3
(Spain) A Montañés	2	2
6	(Uruguay) P Cuevas	6	6
4	(Italy) F Fognini	6	6
(Spain) P Andújar	3	2
(Argentina) F Delbonis	6	6
8	(Slovakia) M Kližan	2	1

Quarterfinals
1	(Spain) R Nadal	4	7	6
6	(Uruguay) P Cuevas	6	5	0
4	(Italy) F Fognini	6	6^{10}	7^{11}
(Argentina) F Delbonis	4	7^{12}	6^{9}

Semifinals
1	(Spain) R Nadal	6	2	5
4	(Italy) F Fognini	1	6	7

=== Bottom half ===
First round
5	(Argentina) L Mayer	6	6^{3}	1^{r}
(Slovenia) B Rola	4	7^{7}	4
WC	(Brazil) J Souza	6	6
Q	(Argentina) F Argüello	2	1
(Spain) A Ramos-Viñolas	6	3	2
(Austria) A Haider-Maurer	3	6	6
WC	(Sweden) E Ymer	4	3
3	(Spain) T Robredo	6	6
7	(Colombia) S Giraldo	3	0^{r}
(Argentina) J Mónaco	6	3
Q	(Italy) M Cecchinato	6	3	5
(Finland) J Nieminen	4	6	7
Q	(Netherlands) T de Bakker	5	6	6
WC	(Brazil) G Clezar	7	3	1
Q	(Spain) D Gimeno-Traver	4	3
2	(Spain) D Ferrer	6	6

Second round
(Slovenia) B Rola	4	7^{11}	4
WC	(Brazil) J Souza	6	6^{9}	6
(Austria) A Haider-Maurer	6	6
3	(Spain) T Robredo	3	2
(Argentina) J Mónaco	6	7^{7}
(Finland) J Nieminen	1	6^{4}
Q	(Netherlands) T de Bakker	6^{8}	0^{r}
2	(Spain) D Ferrer	7^{10}	2

Quarterfinals
WC	(Brazil) J Souza	6^{4}	6	4
(Austria) A Haider-Maurer	7^{7}	1	6
(Argentina) J Mónaco	3	6	2
2	(Spain) D Ferrer	6	4	6

Semifinals
(Austria) A Haider-Maurer	5	1
2	(Spain) D Ferrer	7	6

== Qualifying ==
=== Seeds ===
1. (Spain) Daniel Gimeno-Traver (qualified)
2. (Argentina) Facundo Bagnis (first round)
3. (Netherlands) Thiemo de Bakker (qualified)
4. (Argentina) Facundo Argüello (qualified)
5. (Romania) Adrian Ungur (qualifying competition)
6. (Italy) Marco Cecchinato (qualified)
7. (Brazil) André Ghem (first round)
8. (Argentina) Guido Pella (first round)

=== Qualifiers ===
1. (Spain) Daniel Gimeno-Traver
2. (Italy) Marco Cecchinato
3. (Netherlands) Thiemo de Bakker
4. (Argentina) Facundo Argüello

=== Qualifying draw ===
==== First qualifier ====
First round
1	(Spain) Daniel Gimeno-Traver	6	6
(Brazil) José Pereira	1	3
(Italy) Filippo Volandri	7^{7}	6
7/Alt	(Brazil) André Ghem	6^{5}	1

Qualifying competition
1	(Spain) Daniel Gimeno-Traver	7^{7}	6
(Italy) Filippo Volandri	6^{4}	4

==== Second qualifier ====
First round
2	(Argentina) Facundo Bagnis	0	6^{4}
(Brazil) Fabiano de Paula	6	7^{7}
WC	(Brazil) Carlos Eduardo Severino	4	3
6	(Italy) Marco Cecchinato	6	6

Qualifying competition
(Brazil) Fabiano de Paula	6	6^{2}	6^{5}
6	(Italy) Marco Cecchinato	4	7^{7}	7^{7}

==== Third qualifier ====
First round
3	(Netherlands) Thiemo de Bakker	6	7^{7}
(Brazil) Thiago Monteiro	4	6^{1}
WC	(Brazil) Antonioni Fasano	3	2
5	(Romania) Adrian Ungur	6	6

Qualifying competition
3	(Netherlands) Thiemo de Bakker	6	6
5	(Romania) Adrian Ungur	3	4

==== Fourth qualifier ====
First round
4	(Argentina) Facundo Argüello	1	6	0
(Argentina) Andrea Collarini	6	4	0^{r}
WC	(Sweden) Christian Lindell	7^{7}	7^{7}
8	(Argentina) Guido Pella	6^{6}	6^{4}

Qualifying competition
4	(Argentina) Facundo Argüello	6	6
WC	(Sweden) Christian Lindell	1	3
