= 2014 Rio Open – Men's doubles =

Men's doubles
- 2014 Rio Open

Final
- Champions: (Colombia) Juan Sebastián Cabal (Colombia) Robert Farah
- Runners-up: (Spain) David Marrero (Brazil) Marcelo Melo
- Score: 6–4, 6–2

Details
- Draw: 16
- Seeds: 4

Events
Singles	men	women
Doubles	men	women
Rio Open	· 2015 →

This was the first edition of the event. Juan Sebastián Cabal and Robert Farah won the title, defeating David Marrero and Marcelo Melo in the final, 6–4, 6–2.

== Seeds ==
1. (Austria) Alexander Peya / (Brazil) Bruno Soares (semifinals)
2. (Spain) David Marrero / (Brazil) Marcelo Melo (final)
3. (Spain) Marcel Granollers / (Spain) Marc López (quarterfinals)
4. (Philippines) Treat Huey / (United Kingdom) Dominic Inglot (first round)

== Draw ==
=== Key ===
- Q = Qualifier
- WC = Wild card
- LL = Lucky loser
- Alt = Alternate
- SE = Special exempt
- PR = Protected ranking
- ITF = ITF entry
- JE = Junior exempt
- w/o = Walkover
- r = Retired
- d = Defaulted
- SR = Special ranking

=== Draw ===
First round
1	(Austria) A Peya (Brazil) B Soares	6	3	[10]
WC	(Argentina) J Mónaco (Brazil) A Sá	2	6	[3]
(Netherlands) R Haase (Germany) C Kas	2	7^{10}	[7]
(France) J Chardy (Czech Republic) L Dlouhý	6	6^{8}	[10]
3	(Spain) M Granollers (Spain) M López	6	6
(Spain) P Andújar (Portugal) J Sousa	2	2
(Ukraine) A Dolgopolov (Spain) G García-López	3	6	[8]
(Colombia) JS Cabal (Colombia) R Farah	6	3	[10]
(Italy) D Bracciali (Italy) F Fognini	6	6
(Austria) O Marach (Romania) F Mergea	3	4
Q	(Argentina) F Delbonis (Argentina) L Mayer	6	6
4	(Philippines) T Huey (United Kingdom) D Inglot	4	2
(Uruguay) P Cuevas (Argentina) H Zeballos	6	6
WC	(Brazil) M Demoliner (Brazil) J Souza	4	3
(Germany) A Begemann (Germany) M Emmrich	6^{4}	5
2	(Spain) D Marrero (Brazil) M Melo	7^{7}	7

Quarterfinals
1	(Austria) A Peya (Brazil) B Soares	6	6
(France) J Chardy (Czech Republic) L Dlouhý	4	1
3	(Spain) M Granollers (Spain) M López	3	5
(Colombia) JS Cabal (Colombia) R Farah	6	7
(Italy) D Bracciali (Italy) F Fognini	6	4	[10]
Q	(Argentina) F Delbonis (Argentina) L Mayer	4	6	[8]
(Uruguay) P Cuevas (Argentina) H Zeballos	1	4
2	(Spain) D Marrero (Brazil) M Melo	6	6

Semifinals
1	(Austria) A Peya (Brazil) B Soares	4	2
(Colombia) JS Cabal (Colombia) R Farah	6	6
(Italy) D Bracciali (Italy) F Fognini	3	6	[8]
2	(Spain) D Marrero (Brazil) M Melo	6	2	[10]

Final
(Colombia) JS Cabal (Colombia) R Farah	6	6
2	(Spain) D Marrero (Brazil) M Melo	4	2

== Qualifying ==
=== Seeds ===
1. (Argentina) Facundo Bagnis / (Slovakia) Martin Kližan (withdrew)
2. (Spain) Daniel Gimeno-Traver / (Spain) Albert Montañés (qualifying competition)

=== Qualifiers ===
1. (Argentina) Federico Delbonis / (Argentina) Leonardo Mayer

=== Qualifying draw ===
First round
1	(Argentina) Facundo Bagnis (Slovakia) Martin Kližan
(Argentina) Federico Delbonis (Argentina) Leonardo Mayer	w/o
(Austria) Andreas Haider-Maurer (Austria) Philipp Oswald	3	6	[6]
2	(Spain) Daniel Gimeno-Traver (Spain) Albert Montañés	6	4	[10]

Qualifying competition
(Argentina) Federico Delbonis (Argentina) Leonardo Mayer	7	4	[10]
2	(Spain) Daniel Gimeno-Traver (Spain) Albert Montañés	5	6	[7]
