= 2015 Rio Open – Women's doubles =

Women's doubles
- 2015 Rio Open

Final
- Champions: (Belgium) Ysaline Bonaventure (Sweden) Rebecca Peterson
- Runners-up: (Romania) Irina-Camelia Begu (Argentina) María Irigoyen
- Score: 3–0, ret.

Events
Singles	men	women
Doubles	men	women
← 2014 ·	Rio Open	· 2016 →

Irina-Camelia Begu and María Irigoyen were the defending champions, but retired in the final against Ysaline Bonaventure and Rebecca Peterson.

== Seeds ==
1. (Romania) Irina-Camelia Begu / (Argentina) María Irigoyen (final, retired)
2. (Chinese Taipei) Chan Chin-wei / (Romania) Raluca Olaru (first round)
3. (United Kingdom) Jocelyn Rae / (United Kingdom) Anna Smith (quarterfinals)
4. (Argentina) Florencia Molinero / (Liechtenstein) Stephanie Vogt (first round)

== Draw ==
=== Key ===
- Q = Qualifier
- WC = Wild card
- LL = Lucky loser
- Alt = Alternate
- SE = Special exempt
- PR = Protected ranking
- ITF = ITF entry
- JE = Junior exempt
- w/o = Walkover
- r = Retired
- d = Defaulted
- SR = Special ranking

=== Draw ===
First round
1	(Romania) I-C Begu (Argentina) M Irigoyen	6	6
(Germany) D Pfizenmaier (Slovakia) AK Schmiedlová	1	1
(Israel) J Glushko (Australia) O Rogowska	6	4	[4]
(Paraguay) V Cepede Royg (Spain) B García Vidagany	1	6	[10]
3	(United Kingdom) J Rae (United Kingdom) A Smith	6^{4}	6	[12]
Alt	(Spain) E Cabeza Candela (Italy) G Sanesi	7^{7}	4	[10]
WC	(Brazil) C Alves (Brazil) I Gamarra Martins	3	4
(Chinese Taipei) C-y Hsu (Bulgaria) E Kostova	6	6
(Brazil) G Cé (Brazil) PC Gonçalves	4	7	[8]
(Belgium) Y Bonaventure (Sweden) R Peterson	6	5	[10]
(Montenegro) D Kovinić (Brazil) L Pigossi	7	6
4	(Argentina) F Molinero (Liechtenstein) S Vogt	5	3
(Argentina) T Búa (Venezuela) A Gámiz	2	5
(Romania) E Bogdan (United States) N Melichar	6	7
(Brazil) B Haddad Maia (Brazil) T Pereira	7^{7}	7^{7}
2	(Chinese Taipei) C-w Chan (Romania) R Olaru	6^{2}	6^{4}

Quarterfinals
1	(Romania) I-C Begu (Argentina) M Irigoyen	7^{7}	3	[10]
(Paraguay) V Cepede Royg (Spain) B García Vidagany	6^{3}	6	[5]
3	(United Kingdom) J Rae (United Kingdom) A Smith	6	3	[10]
(Chinese Taipei) C-y Hsu (Bulgaria) E Kostova	3	6	[12]
(Belgium) Y Bonaventure (Sweden) R Peterson	6	3	[12]
(Montenegro) D Kovinić (Brazil) L Pigossi	4	6	[10]
(Romania) E Bogdan (United States) N Melichar	5	0
(Brazil) B Haddad Maia (Brazil) T Pereira	7	6

Semifinals
1	(Romania) I-C Begu (Argentina) M Irigoyen	6	6
(Chinese Taipei) C-y Hsu (Bulgaria) E Kostova	2	2
(Belgium) Y Bonaventure (Sweden) R Peterson	w/o
(Brazil) B Haddad Maia (Brazil) T Pereira

Final
1	(Romania) I-C Begu (Argentina) M Irigoyen	0^{r}
(Belgium) Y Bonaventure (Sweden) R Peterson	3
