= 2014 Rio Open – Men's singles =

Men's singles
- 2014 Rio Open

Final
- Champion: (Spain) Rafael Nadal
- Runner-up: (Ukraine) Alexandr Dolgopolov
- Score: 6–3, 7–6^{(7–3)}

Details
- Draw: 32 (4 Q / 3 WC )
- Seeds: 8

Events
Singles	men	women
Doubles	men	women
- Rio Open

This was the first edition of the tournament.
Rafael Nadal won his 62nd tour-level title, defeating Alexandr Dolgopolov in the final, 6–3, 7-6(3).

== Seeds ==
1. (Spain) Rafael Nadal (champion)
2. (Spain) David Ferrer (semifinals)
3. (Italy) Fabio Fognini (quarterfinals)
4. (Spain) Tommy Robredo (quarterfinals)
5. (Spain) Nicolás Almagro (first round)
6. (Spain) Marcel Granollers (first round)
7. (Argentina) Juan Mónaco (second round)
8. (Spain) Pablo Andújar (semifinals)

== Draw ==
Key

- Q = Qualifier
- WC = Wild card
- LL = Lucky loser
- Alt = Alternate
- ITF = ITF entry
- PR = Protected ranking
- SR = Special ranking
- SE = Special exempt
- JE = Junior exempt
- JR = Junior Accelerator Programme entrant
- CO = College Accelerator Programme entrant
- NG = Next Gen Accelerator Program entrant
- w/o = Walkover
- r = Retired
- d = Defaulted

=== Finals ===
Semifinals
1	(Spain) Rafael Nadal	2	6	7^{12}
8	(Spain) Pablo Andújar	6	3	6^{10}
(Ukraine) Alexandr Dolgopolov	6	6
2	(Spain) David Ferrer	4	4

Final
1	(Spain) Rafael Nadal	6	7^{7}
(Ukraine) Alexandr Dolgopolov	3	6^{3}

=== Section top half ===
First round
1	(Spain) R Nadal	6	7
(Spain) D Gimeno-Traver	3	5
(Spain) A Montañés	6	7^{7}
(Netherlands) R Haase	1	6^{4}
(Argentina) L Mayer	2	0
(Spain) A Ramos	6	6
(Portugal) J Sousa	2	6	7
6	(Spain) M Granollers	6	3	5
4	(Spain) T Robredo	7^{7}	6
(Spain) P Carreño Busta	6^{5}	3
(Italy) F Volandri	7^{9}	3	0^{r}
Q	(Serbia) D Lajović	6^{7}	6	4
(Spain) G García-López	4	6	6^{4}
Q	(Slovakia) M Kližan	6	4	7^{7}
(Germany) J Reister	4	3
8	(Spain) P Andújar	6	6

Second round
1	(Spain) R Nadal	6	6
(Spain) A Montañés	1	2
(Spain) A Ramos	6^{6}	6	3
(Portugal) J Sousa	7^{8}	2	6
4	(Spain) T Robredo	6	6
Q	(Serbia) D Lajović	2	1
Q	(Slovakia) M Kližan
8	(Spain) P Andújar	w/o

Quarterfinals
1	(Spain) R Nadal	6	6
(Portugal) J Sousa	1	0
4	(Spain) T Robredo	1	1
8	(Spain) P Andújar	6	6

Semifinals
1	(Spain) R Nadal	2	6	7^{12}
8	(Spain) P Andújar	6	3	6^{10}

=== Section bottom half ===
First round
5	(Spain) N Almagro	6	3	0
(Ukraine) A Dolgopolov	2	6	6
WC	(Brazil) J Souza	5	6	2
Q	(Argentina) F Bagnis	7	2	6
PR	(Uruguay) P Cuevas	6^{0}	6	6
(Colombia) A Gonzaléz	7^{7}	1	3
Q	(Slovenia) A Bedene	6^{5}	6	1
3	(Italy) F Fognini	7^{7}	0	6
7	(Argentina) J Mónaco	6	6
(Argentina) H Zeballos	3	1
(Colombia) S Giraldo	6	4	3
WC	(Brazil) T Bellucci	3	6	6
WC	(Brazil) G Clezar	1	1
(Argentina) F Delbonis	6	6
(France) J Chardy	2	3
2	(Spain) D Ferrer	6	6

Second round
(Ukraine) A Dolgopolov	6^{4}	6	7^{7}
Q	(Argentina) F Bagnis	7^{7}	2	6^{4}
PR	(Uruguay) P Cuevas	6^{1}	6	3
3	(Italy) F Fognini	7^{7}	4	6
7	(Argentina) J Mónaco	6	3	3
WC	(Brazil) T Bellucci	4	6	6
(Argentina) F Delbonis	6^{2}	1
2	(Spain) D Ferrer	7^{7}	6

Quarterfinals
(Ukraine) A Dolgopolov	6	6
3	(Italy) F Fognini	1	1
WC	(Brazil) T Bellucci	6	3	3
2	(Spain) D Ferrer	4	6	6

Semifinals
(Ukraine) A Dolgopolov	6	6
2	(Spain) D Ferrer	4	4

== Qualifying ==
=== Seeds ===
1. (France) Stéphane Robert (qualifying competition)
2. (Slovakia) Martin Kližan (qualified)
3. (Serbia) Dušan Lajović (qualified)
4. (Slovenia) Aljaž Bedene (qualified)
5. (Austria) Andreas Haider-Maurer (first round)
6. (Argentina) Facundo Argüello (first round)
7. (Argentina) Diego Sebastián Schwartzman (qualifying competition)
8. (Spain) Pere Riba (first round)

=== Qualifiers ===
1. (Argentina) Facundo Bagnis
2. (Slovakia) Martin Kližan
3. (Serbia) Dušan Lajović
4. (Slovenia) Aljaž Bedene

=== Qualifying draw ===
==== First qualifier ====
First round
1	(France) Stéphane Robert	6	6^{5}	6
WC	(Brazil) Marcelo Zormann da Silva	1	7^{7}	0
(Argentina) Facundo Bagnis	3	6	6
8	(Spain) Pere Riba	6	3	2

Qualifying competition
1	(France) Stéphane Robert	6	4	3
(Argentina) Facundo Bagnis	3	6	6

==== Second qualifier ====
First round
2	(Slovakia) Martin Kližan	3	6	6
(Brazil) Ricardo Hocevar	6	2	4
(Argentina) Martín Alund	6	4	6
5	(Austria) Andreas Haider-Maurer	3	6	2

Qualifying competition
2	(Slovakia) Martin Kližan	6	7^{7}
(Argentina) Martín Alund	4	6^{5}

==== Third qualifier ====
First round
3	(Serbia) Dušan Lajović	6	4	6
(Brazil) André Ghem	4	6	3
(Brazil) Rogério Dutra da Silva	7	6
6	(Argentina) Facundo Argüello	5	2

Qualifying competition
3	(Serbia) Dušan Lajović	6	6^{5}	6
(Brazil) Rogério Dutra da Silva	4	7^{7}	1

==== Fourth qualifier ====
First round
4	(Slovenia) Aljaž Bedene	5	7	6
WC	(Brazil) José Pereira	7	5	2
WC	(Brazil) Wilson Leite	1	2
7	(Argentina) Diego Sebastián Schwartzman	6	6

Qualifying competition
4	(Slovenia) Aljaž Bedene	7^{7}	6
7	(Argentina) Diego Sebastián Schwartzman	6^{5}	1
