= 2014 Rio Open =

- Date: 17–23 February
- Edition: 1st
- Category: ATP World Tour 500; WTA International
- Draw: 32S / 16D
- Prize money: $1,353,550 $235,000
- Surface: Clay - outdoor
- Location: Rio de Janeiro, Brazil
- Venue: Jockey Club Brasileiro

Champions

Men's singles
- (Spain) Rafael Nadal

Women's singles
- (Japan) Kurumi Nara

Men's doubles
- (Colombia) Juan Sebastián Cabal / (Colombia) Robert Farah

Women's doubles
- (Romania) Irina-Camelia Begu / (Argentina) María Irigoyen
Rio Open	· 2015 →

The 2014 Rio Open was a combined men's and women's professional tennis tournament played on outdoor clay courts. It was the inaugural edition of the tournament, and part of the 2014 ATP World Tour and the 2014 WTA Tour. It took place at the Jockey Club Brasileiro in Rio de Janeiro, Brazil between 17 February and 23 February 2014. Rafael Nadal and Kurumi Nara won the singles titles.

== Finals ==
=== Men's singles ===
- (Spain) Rafael Nadal defeated (Ukraine) Alexandr Dolgopolov, 6–3, 7–6^{(7–3)}

=== Women's singles ===
- (Japan) Kurumi Nara defeated (Czech Republic) Klára Zakopalová, 6–1, 4–6, 6–1

=== Men's doubles ===
- (Colombia) Juan Sebastián Cabal / (Colombia) Robert Farah defeated (Spain) David Marrero / (Brazil) Marcelo Melo, 6–4, 6–2

=== Women's doubles ===
- (Romania) Irina-Camelia Begu / (Argentina) María Irigoyen defeated (Sweden) Johanna Larsson / (South Africa) Chanelle Scheepers, 6–2, 6–0

== Points and prize money ==
=== Point distribution ===
Event	W	F	SF	QF	Round of 16	Round of 32	Q	Q3	Q2	Q1
Men's singles	500	300	180	90	45	0	20	10	0	—
Men's doubles	500	300	180	90	—	—	20	0	0	—
Women's singles	280	180	110	60	30	1	18	14	10	1
Women's doubles	280	180	110	60	1	—	—	—	—	—

=== Prize money ===
Event	W	F	SF	QF	Round of 16	Round of 32^{1}	Q3	Q2	Q1
Men's singles	$316,400	$142,650	$67,570	$32,605	$16,625	$9,150	$1,030	$570	—
Men's doubles *	$93,460	$42,180	$19,890	$9,610	$4,920	—	—	—	—
Women's singles	$43,000	$21,400	$11,300	$5,900	$3,310	$1,925	$1,005	$730	$530
Women's doubles *	$12,300	$6,400	$3,435	$1,820	$960	—	—	—	—
Doubles prize money per team

_{^{1} Qualifiers prize money is also the Round of 32 prize money}

== ATP singles main-draw entrants ==
=== Seeds ===
Country	Player	Ranking^{1}	Seed
ESP	Rafael Nadal	1	1
ESP	David Ferrer	5	2
ITA	Fabio Fognini	14	3
ESP	Tommy Robredo	17	4
ESP	Nicolás Almagro	18	5
ESP	Marcel Granollers	34	6
ARG	Juan Mónaco	42	7
ESP	Pablo Andújar	43	8

- ^{1} Rankings as of February 10, 2014.

=== Other entrants ===
The following players received wildcards into the main draw:

- (Brazil) Thomaz Bellucci
- (Brazil) Guilherme Clezar
- (Brazil) João Souza

The following player received entry using a protected ranking into the main draw:

- (Uruguay) Pablo Cuevas

The following players received entry from the qualifying draw:

- (Argentina) Facundo Bagnis
- (Slovenia) Aljaž Bedene
- (Slovakia) Martin Kližan
- (Serbia) Dušan Lajović

=== Withdrawals ===
Before the tournament

- (Argentina) Carlos Berlocq → replaced by (Spain) Albert Ramos

During the tournament

- (Slovakia) Martin Kližan (stomach pain)

=== Retirements ===
- (Italy) Filippo Volandri (shoulder injury)

== ATP doubles main-draw entrants ==
=== Seeds ===
Country	Player	Country	Player	Rank^{1}	Seed
AUT	Alexander Peya	BRA	Bruno Soares	6	1
ESP	David Marrero	BRA	Marcelo Melo	13	2
ESP	Marcel Granollers	ESP	Marc López	49	3
PHI	Treat Huey	GBR	Dominic Inglot	49	4

- ^{1} Rankings as of February 10, 2014.

=== Other entrants ===
The following pairs received wildcards into the main draw:

- (Brazil) Marcelo Demoliner / (Brazil) João Souza
- (Argentina) Juan Mónaco / (Brazil) André Sá

The following pair received entry from the qualifying draw:

- (Argentina) Federico Delbonis / (Argentina) Leonardo Mayer

== WTA singles main-draw entrants ==
=== Seeds ===
Country	Player	Ranking^{1}	Seed
CZE	Klára Zakopalová	34	1
ITA	Francesca Schiavone	43	2
ARG	Paula Ormaechea	59	3
ROU	Alexandra Cadanțu	60	4
JPN	Kurumi Nara	64	5
ESP	María Teresa Torró Flor	65	6
CZE	Barbora Záhlavová-Strýcová	68	7
USA	Vania King	69	8

- ^{1} Rankings as of February 10, 2014.

=== Other entrants ===
The following players received wildcards into the main draw:

- (Brazil) Paula Cristina Gonçalves
- (Brazil) Beatriz Haddad Maia
- (Brazil) Laura Pigossi

The following players received entry from the qualifying draw:

- (Romania) Irina-Camelia Begu
- (Italy) Nastassja Burnett
- (Paraguay) Verónica Cepede Royg
- (United States) Nicole Gibbs
- (Montenegro) Danka Kovinić
- (Belgium) Alison Van Uytvanck

=== Withdrawals ===
Before the tournament

- (France) Virginie Razzano → replaced by (Colombia) Mariana Duque

=== Retirements ===
- (Spain) Lourdes Domínguez Lino (left hamstring strain)

== WTA doubles main-draw entrants ==
=== Seeds ===
Country	Player	Country	Player	Rank^{1}	Seed
CZE	Barbora Záhlavová-Strýcová	CZE	Klára Zakopalová	77	1
CRO	Darija Jurak	SLO	Andreja Klepač	124	2
HUN	Tímea Babos	AUS	Jarmila Gajdošová	135	3
UKR	Irina Buryachok	POL	Katarzyna Piter	148	4

- ^{1} Rankings as of February 10, 2014.

=== Other entrants ===
The following pairs received wildcards into the main draw:

- (Brazil) Maria Fernanda Alves / (Brazil) Beatriz Haddad Maia
- (Brazil) Paula Cristina Gonçalves / (Brazil) Laura Pigossi

=== Withdrawals ===
During the tournament

- (Spain) Lourdes Domínguez Lino (left hamstring strain)
