= 2015 Croatia Open Umag =

- Date: 20–26 July
- Edition: 26th
- Category: ATP World Tour 250
- Draw: 28S / 16D
- Prize money: €439,405
- Surface: Clay
- Location: Umag, Croatia

Champions

Singles
- (Austria) Dominic Thiem

Doubles
- (Argentina) Máximo González / (Brazil) André Sá
← 2014 ·	Croatia Open	· 2016 →

The 2015 Croatia Open Umag (also known as the Konzum Croatia Open Umag for sponsorship reasons) was a men's tennis tournament played on outdoor clay courts. It was the 26th edition of the Croatia Open, and part of the ATP World Tour 250 Series of the 2015 ATP World Tour. It took place at the International Tennis Center in Umag, Croatia, from 20 July through 26 July 2015. Fourth-seeded Dominic Thiem won the singles title.

== Finals ==
=== Singles ===
(Austria) Dominic Thiem defeated (Portugal) João Sousa, 6–4, 6–1

- It was Thiem's 2nd singles title of the year and of his career.

=== Doubles ===
(Argentina) Máximo González / (Brazil) André Sá defeated (Poland) Mariusz Fyrstenberg / (Mexico) Santiago González, 4–6, 6–3, [10–5]

== Singles main draw entrants ==
=== Seeds ===
Country	Player	Rank^{1}	Seed
FRA	Gaël Monfils	17	1
ESP	Roberto Bautista Agut	23	2
ITA	Andreas Seppi	26	3
AUT	Dominic Thiem	28	4
ITA	Fabio Fognini	33	5
GER	Philipp Kohlschreiber	34	6
CRO	Borna Ćorić	37	7
SVK	Martin Kližan	38	8

- ^{1} Rankings are as of July 13, 2015

=== Other entrants ===
The following players received wildcards into the singles main draw:

- (Croatia) Toni Androić
- (Croatia) Mate Delić
- (Russia) Andrey Rublev

The following players received entry from the qualifying draw:

- (Serbia) Laslo Djere
- (Italy) Thomas Fabbiano
- (Italy) Matteo Trevisan
- (Austria) Bastian Trinker

=== Withdrawals ===
Before the tournament

- (Spain) Pablo Andújar →replaced by Damir Džumhur

=== Retirements ===
- (Austria) Andreas Haider-Maurer
- (Serbia) Dušan Lajović

== Doubles main draw entrants ==
=== Seeds ===
Country	Player	Country	Player	Rank^{1}	Seed
CRO	Marin Draganja	FIN	Henri Kontinen	60	1
GBR	Dominic Inglot	GER	Philipp Petzschner	95	2
POL	Mariusz Fyrstenberg	MEX	Santiago González	98	3
ESP	Pablo Carreño Busta	ESP	Marcel Granollers	104	4

- Rankings are as of July 13, 2015

=== Other entrants ===
The following pairs received wildcards into the doubles main draw:

- (France) Paterne Mamata / (France) Gaël Monfils
- (Croatia) Dino Marcan / (Croatia) Antonio Šančić
