= 2014 ATP Vegeta Croatia Open Umag – Singles =

Singles
- 2014 ATP Vegeta Croatia Open Umag

Final
- Champion: (Uruguay) Pablo Cuevas
- Runner-up: (Spain) Tommy Robredo
- Score: 6–3, 6–4

Details
- Draw: 28 (4 Q / 3 WC )
- Seeds: 8

Events
Singles	Doubles
- Croatia Open

Tommy Robredo was the defending champion, but lost to Pablo Cuevas in the final, 3–6, 4–6.

== Seeds ==
The top four seeds receive a bye into the second round.

1. (Italy) Fabio Fognini (semifinals)
2. (Spain) Tommy Robredo (final)
3. (Croatia) Marin Čilić (semifinals)
4. (Portugal) João Sousa (second round)
5. (Czech Republic) Lukáš Rosol (quarterfinals)
6. (Italy) Andreas Seppi (second round)
7. (France) Édouard Roger-Vasselin (first round)
8. (Argentina) Carlos Berlocq (second round, withdrew)

== Draw ==
Key

- Q = Qualifier
- WC = Wild card
- LL = Lucky loser
- Alt = Alternate
- ITF = ITF entry
- PR = Protected ranking
- SR = Special ranking
- SE = Special exempt
- JE = Junior exempt
- JR = Junior Accelerator Programme entrant
- CO = College Accelerator Programme entrant
- NG = Next Gen Accelerator Program entrant
- w/o = Walkover
- r = Retired
- d = Defaulted

=== Finals ===
Semifinals
1	(Italy) Fabio Fognini	3	4
Q	(Uruguay) Pablo Cuevas	6	6
3	(Croatia) Marin Čilić	6^{10}	3
2	(Spain) Tommy Robredo	7^{12}	6

Final
Q	(Uruguay) Pablo Cuevas	6	6
2	(Spain) Tommy Robredo	3	4

=== Top half ===
First round
(Spain) A Montañés	6	6
SE	(Germany) A Zverev	4	4
WC	(Croatia) A Pavić	4	7^{7}	1
Q	(Argentina) H Zeballos	6	6^{2}	6
WC	(Croatia) B Ćorić	6	6
7	(France) É Roger-Vasselin	2	4
(Russia) T Gabashvili	6	6
(Serbia) D Lajović	4	3
WC	(Croatia) M Delić	6	4	4
Q	(Uruguay) P Cuevas	4	6	6
Q	(Italy) M Cecchinato	2	7^{7}	1
6	(Italy) A Seppi	6	6^{2}	6

Second round
1	(Italy) F Fognini	7^{7}	6
(Spain) A Montañés	6^{2}	0
Q	(Argentina) H Zeballos	6^{4}	3
WC	(Croatia) B Ćorić	7^{7}	6
4	(Portugal) J Sousa	6	4	2
(Russia) T Gabashvili	3	6	6
Q	(Uruguay) P Cuevas	6	6
6	(Italy) A Seppi	3	1

Quarterfinals
1	(Italy) F Fognini	5	7^{7}	6
WC	(Croatia) B Ćorić	7	6^{4}	3
(Russia) T Gabashvili	3	6	2
Q	(Uruguay) P Cuevas	6	4	6

Semifinals
1	(Italy) F Fognini	3	4
Q	(Uruguay) P Cuevas	6	6

=== Bottom half ===
First round
5	(Czech Republic) L Rosol	6	3	7^{7}
(Argentina) DS Schwartzman	3	6	6^{2}
(Spain) P Riba	6^{7}	6	6
(Czech Republic) J Veselý	7^{9}	3	3
(Germany) J Reister	6^{2}	7^{7}	2
(Netherlands) I Sijsling	7^{7}	6^{3}	6
8	(Argentina) C Berlocq	7^{7}	6
Q	(Slovakia) A Martin	6^{4}	3
(Italy) P Lorenzi	6	1	5
(Spain) P Carreño Busta	4	6	7
(France) B Paire	5	3
(Spain) A Ramos Viñolas	7	6

Second round
5	(Czech Republic) L Rosol	7^{7}	6
(Spain) P Riba	6^{4}	1
(Netherlands) I Sijsling	5	3
3	(Croatia) M Čilić	7	6
8	(Argentina) C Berlocq
(Spain) P Carreño Busta	w/o
(Spain) A Ramos Viñolas	4	4
2	(Spain) T Robredo	6	6

Quarterfinals
5	(Czech Republic) L Rosol	0	2
3	(Croatia) M Čilić	6	6
(Spain) P Carreño Busta	1	4
2	(Spain) T Robredo	6	6

Semifinals
3	(Croatia) M Čilić	6^{10}	3
2	(Spain) T Robredo	7^{12}	6

== Qualifying ==
=== Seeds ===
1. (Uruguay) Pablo Cuevas (qualified)
2. (Argentina) Horacio Zeballos (qualified)
3. (Slovenia) Aljaž Bedene (qualifying competition)
4. (Slovakia) Norbert Gomboš (qualifying competition)
5. (Italy) Marco Cecchinato (qualified)
6. (Slovakia) Andrej Martin (qualified)
7. (Croatia) Toni Androić (second round, retired)
8. (Argentina) Renzo Olivo (qualifying competition)

=== Qualifiers ===
1. (Uruguay) Pablo Cuevas
2. (Argentina) Horacio Zeballos
3. (Slovakia) Andrej Martin
4. (Italy) Marco Cecchinato

=== Qualifying draw ===
==== First qualifier ====
First round
1	(Uruguay) Pablo Cuevas	6	6
WC	(Germany) Nikolas Walterscheid-Tukic	0	0
Alt	(Croatia) Luka Zaninović	2	0
(Serbia) Nikola Ćaćić	6	6
(Croatia) Joško Topić	5	6	4
(Brazil) Thiago Monteiro	7	0	6
(Austria) Bastian Trinker	3	2
8	(Argentina) Renzo Olivo	6	6

Second round
1	(Uruguay) Pablo Cuevas	6	6
(Serbia) Nikola Ćaćić	4	4
(Brazil) Thiago Monteiro	4	3
8	(Argentina) Renzo Olivo	6	6

Qualifying competition
1	(Uruguay) Pablo Cuevas	7	6
8	(Argentina) Renzo Olivo	5	2

==== Second qualifier ====
First round
2	(Argentina) Horacio Zeballos	6	6
(Slovenia) Tom Kočevar-Dešman	1	2
(Argentina) Guillermo Durán	2	5
(Serbia) Boris Pašanski	6	7
(Croatia) Duje Kekez	6	6
(Serbia) Miljan Zekić	4	4
WC	(Croatia) Mile Čilić	0	2
7	(Croatia) Toni Androić	6	6

Second round
2	(Argentina) Horacio Zeballos	6	7^{7}
(Serbia) Boris Pašanski	3	6^{5}
(Croatia) Duje Kekez	2	6	0
7	(Croatia) Toni Androić	6	4	0^{r}

Qualifying competition
2	(Argentina) Horacio Zeballos	6	6
(Croatia) Duje Kekez	1	0

==== Third qualifier ====
First round
3	(Slovenia) Aljaž Bedene	7^{7}	7^{7}
(Croatia) Viktor Galović	6^{4}	6^{1}
(Bulgaria) Tihomir Grozdanov	3	4
WC	(Croatia) Nino Serdarušić	6	6
(Slovenia) Tomislav Ternar	1	2
(Croatia) Dino Marcan	6	6
(Bosnia and Herzegovina) Tomislav Brkić	2	3
6	(Slovakia) Andrej Martin	6	6

Second round
3	(Slovenia) Aljaž Bedene	6	6
WC	(Croatia) Nino Serdarušić	2	2
(Croatia) Dino Marcan	3	2
6	(Slovakia) Andrej Martin	6	6

Qualifying competition
3	(Slovenia) Aljaž Bedene	6	4	2
6	(Slovakia) Andrej Martin	3	6	6

==== Fourth qualifier ====
First round
4	(Slovakia) Norbert Gomboš	2	6	7
(Slovakia) Ivo Klec	6	3	5
WC	(Croatia) Stjepan Cagalj	1	4
(Serbia) Danilo Petrović	6	6
(Croatia) Matija Pecotić	7^{7}	6
(Croatia) Mate Pavić	6^{5}	1
(Serbia) Ilija Vučić	3	2
5	(Italy) Marco Cecchinato	6	6

Second round
4	(Slovakia) Norbert Gomboš	6	6
(Serbia) Danilo Petrović	2	1
(Croatia) Matija Pecotić	4	1
5	(Italy) Marco Cecchinato	6	6

Qualifying competition
4	(Slovakia) Norbert Gomboš	4	6	6^{3}
5	(Italy) Marco Cecchinato	6	3	7^{7}
