= 2014 ATP Vegeta Croatia Open Umag =

- Date: 21–27 July
- Edition: 25th
- Category: ATP World Tour 250
- Draw: 28S / 16D
- Prize money: €426,605
- Surface: Clay / outdoor
- Location: Umag, Croatia

Champions

Singles
- (Uruguay) Pablo Cuevas

Doubles
- (Czech Republic) František Čermák / (Czech Republic) Lukáš Rosol
← 2013 ·	Croatia Open	· 2015 →

The 2014 ATP Vegeta Croatia Open Umag was a men's tennis tournament played on outdoor clay courts. It was the 25th edition of the Croatia Open, and was part of the ATP World Tour 250 Series of the 2014 ATP World Tour. It took place at the International Tennis Center in Umag, Croatia, from 21 July through 27 July 2014. Unseeded Pablo Cuevas, who entered the main draw as a qualifier, won the singles title.

== Finals ==
=== Singles ===
(Uruguay) Pablo Cuevas defeated (Spain) Tommy Robredo, 6–3, 6–4

- It was Cuevas' 2nd and last singles title of the year and the 2nd of his career.

=== Doubles ===
- (Czech Republic) František Čermák / (Czech Republic) Lukáš Rosol defeated (Serbia) Dušan Lajović / (Croatia) Franko Škugor, 6–4, 7–6^{(7–5)}

== Singles main draw entrants ==
=== Seeds ===
Country	Player	Rank^{1}	Seed
ITA	Fabio Fognini	15	1
ESP	Tommy Robredo	20	2
CRO	Marin Čilić	22	3
POR	João Sousa	35	4
CZE	Lukáš Rosol	42	5
ITA	Andreas Seppi	44	6
FRA	Édouard Roger-Vasselin	45	7
ARG	Carlos Berlocq	56	8

- ^{1} Rankings are as of July 14, 2014

=== Other entrants ===
The following players received wildcards into the singles main draw:

- (Croatia) Borna Ćorić
- (Croatia) Mate Delić
- (Croatia) Ante Pavić

The following players received entry from the qualifying draw:

- (Italy) Marco Cecchinato
- (Uruguay) Pablo Cuevas
- (Slovakia) Andrej Martin
- (Argentina) Horacio Zeballos

=== Withdrawals ===
Before the tournament

- (Ukraine) Alexandr Dolgopolov (knee injury)
- (Colombia) Santiago Giraldo
- (Austria) Jürgen Melzer
- (Argentina) Leonardo Mayer

During the tournament

- (Argentina) Carlos Berlocq

== Doubles main draw entrants ==
=== Seeds ===
Country	Player	Country	Player	Rank^{1}	Seed
AUT	Julian Knowle	AUT	Oliver Marach	86	1
URU	Pablo Cuevas	ARG	Horacio Zeballos	109	2
CRO	Mate Pavić	BRA	André Sá	112	3
CZE	František Čermák	CZE	Lukáš Rosol	122	4

- Rankings are as of July 14, 2014

=== Other entrants ===
The following pairs received wildcards into the doubles main draw:

- (Croatia) Toni Androić / (Croatia) Marin Čilić
- (Croatia) Dino Marcan / (Croatia) Nino Serdarušić
