= 2013 ATP Vegeta Croatia Open Umag – Singles =

Singles
- 2013 ATP Vegeta Croatia Open Umag

Final
- Champion: (Spain) Tommy Robredo
- Runner-up: (Italy) Fabio Fognini
- Score: 6–0, 6–3

Details
- Draw: 28 (4 Q / 3 WC )
- Seeds: 8

Events
Singles	Doubles
- Croatia Open

Marin Čilić was the defending champion, but withdrew with a knee injury before the tournament began.
Tommy Robredo won the title, defeating Fabio Fognini in the final, 6–0, 6–3.

== Seeds ==
The top four seeds receive a bye into the second round.

1. (France) Richard Gasquet (second round)
2. (Italy) Andreas Seppi (semifinals)
3. (Italy) Fabio Fognini (final)
4. (Ukraine) Alexandr Dolgopolov (second round)
5. (Spain) Tommy Robredo (champion)
6. (Slovakia) Martin Kližan (quarterfinals)
7. (Germany) Florian Mayer (first round)
8. (Argentina) Carlos Berlocq (second round)

== Draw ==
Key

- Q = Qualifier
- WC = Wild card
- LL = Lucky loser
- Alt = Alternate
- ITF = ITF entry
- PR = Protected ranking
- SR = Special ranking
- SE = Special exempt
- JE = Junior exempt
- JR = Junior Accelerator Programme entrant
- CO = College Accelerator Programme entrant
- NG = Next Gen Accelerator Program entrant
- w/o = Walkover
- r = Retired
- d = Defaulted

=== Finals ===
Semifinals
(France) Gaël Monfils	0	6	6^{3}
3	(Italy) Fabio Fognini	6	3	7^{7}
5	(Spain) Tommy Robredo	6	2	6
2	(Italy) Andreas Seppi	3	6	4

Final
3	(Italy) Fabio Fognini	0	3
5	(Spain) Tommy Robredo	6	6

=== Top half ===
First round
Q	(Serbia) D Lajović	6^{3}	1
(Spain) A Montañés	7^{7}	6
(France) G Monfils	7	6
WC	(Croatia) M Pavić	5	2
Q	(Slovenia) B Kavčič	6^{5}	6	7
7	(Germany) F Mayer	7^{7}	0	5
(Russia) D Tursunov	3	3
(Netherlands) T de Bakker	6	6
(Argentina) L Mayer	6	6
(Spain) A Ramos	1	3
(Italy) P Lorenzi	2	1
6	(Slovakia) M Kližan	6	6

Second round
1	(France) R Gasquet	4	4
(Spain) A Montañés	6	6
(France) G Monfils	6	6
Q	(Slovenia) B Kavčič	3	1
3	(Italy) F Fognini	7	6
(Netherlands) T de Bakker	5	3
(Argentina) L Mayer	6	1	6^{3}
6	(Slovakia) M Kližan	3	6	7^{7}

Quarterfinals
(Spain) A Montañés	2	7	5
(France) G Monfils	6	5	7
3	(Italy) F Fognini	6	6
6	(Slovakia) M Kližan	4	2

Semifinals
(France) G Monfils	0	6	6^{3}
3	(Italy) F Fognini	6	3	7^{7}

=== Bottom half ===
First round
5	(Spain) T Robredo	6	6
(Czech Republic) J Hájek	3	2
WC	(Croatia) A Veić	6^{6}	1
(Serbia) V Troicki	7^{8}	6
Q	(Netherlands) B Westerhof	2	2
(Slovenia) A Bedene	6	6
8	(Argentina) C Berlocq	6	6
Q	(Croatia) J Topić	0	1
WC	(Croatia) B Ćorić	7^{7}	4	0
(Argentina) H Zeballos	6^{5}	6	6
(Austria) A Haider-Maurer	6	6
(Czech Republic) J Veselý	4	4

Second round
5	(Spain) T Robredo	6	6
(Serbia) V Troicki	0	4
(Slovenia) A Bedene	6	6
4	(Ukraine) A Dolgopolov	3	1
8	(Argentina) C Berlocq	6	3	2
(Argentina) H Zeballos	3	6	6
(Austria) A Haider-Maurer	1	0^{r}
2	(Italy) A Seppi	6	4

Quarterfinals
5	(Spain) T Robredo	6	6
(Slovenia) A Bedene	1	4
(Argentina) H Zeballos	5^{r}
2	(Italy) A Seppi	6

Semifinals
5	(Spain) T Robredo	6	2	6
2	(Italy) A Seppi	3	6	4

== Qualifying ==
=== Seeds ===
1. (Serbia) Dušan Lajović (qualified)
2. (Argentina) Diego Sebastián Schwartzman (first round)
3. (Slovenia) Blaž Kavčič (qualified)
4. (Serbia) Boris Pašanski (qualifying competition)
5. (Netherlands) Boy Westerhof (qualified)
6. (Czech Republic) Jaroslav Pospíšil (second round)
7. (Serbia) Miljan Zekić (first round)
8. (Slovakia) Pavol Červenák (second round)

=== Qualifiers ===
1. (Serbia) Dušan Lajović
2. (Croatia) Joško Topić
3. (Slovenia) Blaž Kavčič
4. (Netherlands) Boy Westerhof

=== Qualifying draw ===
==== First qualifier ====
First round
1	(Serbia) Dušan Lajović	6	3
(Croatia) Franko Škugor	4	1^{r}
(Serbia) Danilo Petrović	6	6
(Bosnia and Herzegovina) Tomislav Brkić	4	4
(Croatia) Luka Zaninović	7	4	7
WC	(Croatia) Deni Zmak	5	6	5
(Croatia) Kristijan Mesaroš	6	6
7	(Serbia) Miljan Zekić	3	4

Second round
1	(Serbia) Dušan Lajović	6	4	6
(Serbia) Danilo Petrović	4	6	4
(Croatia) Luka Zaninović	4	2
(Croatia) Kristijan Mesaroš	6	6

Qualifying competition
1	(Serbia) Dušan Lajović	4	6	7^{7}
(Croatia) Kristijan Mesaroš	6	0	6^{4}

==== Second qualifier ====
First round
2	(Argentina) Diego Sebastián Schwartzman	3	4
(Croatia) Duje Kekez	6	6
(Ukraine) Alexandr Kushakov	5	3
(Croatia) Tomislav Draganja	7	6
(Poland) Adam Chadaj	2	2
(Croatia) Joško Topić	6	6
WC	(Croatia) Nino Serdarušić	3	1
8	(Slovakia) Pavol Červenák	6	6

Second round
(Croatia) Duje Kekez	6	6
(Croatia) Tomislav Draganja	1	4
(Croatia) Joško Topić	4	6	6
8	(Slovakia) Pavol Červenák	6	1	4

Qualifying competition
(Croatia) Duje Kekez	6	6^{2}	4
(Croatia) Joško Topić	3	7^{7}	6

==== Third qualifier ====
First round
3	(Slovenia) Blaž Kavčič	6	4
(Italy) Viktor Galović	4	0^{r}
(Croatia) Matej Svjetličić	6^{1}	1
(Slovenia) Miha Mlakar	7^{7}	6
(Austria) Bastian Trinker	6	6
(Slovenia) Andraž Bedene	2	1
(Croatia) Filip Veger	2	2
6/WC	(Czech Republic) Jaroslav Pospíšil	6	6

Second round
3	(Slovenia) Blaž Kavčič	6	6
(Slovenia) Miha Mlakar	3	0
(Austria) Bastian Trinker	6	6
6/WC	(Czech Republic) Jaroslav Pospíšil	2	1

Qualifying competition
3	(Slovenia) Blaž Kavčič	6	6
(Austria) Bastian Trinker	4	2

==== Fourth qualifier ====
First round
4	(Serbia) Boris Pašanski	6	6
(Slovenia) Mike Urbanija	3	3
(Croatia) Nikola Mektić	6	6
WC	(Spain) Andrés Arce	0	1
(Slovenia) Tom Kočevar-Dešman	7	6
(Switzerland) Jens Hauser	5	4
(Slovenia) Tilen Žitnik	6	1^{r}
5	(Netherlands) Boy Westerhof	4	5

Second round
4	(Serbia) Boris Pašanski	7	7^{7}
(Croatia) Nikola Mektić	5	6^{2}
(Slovenia) Tom Kočevar-Dešman	3	2
5	(Netherlands) Boy Westerhof	6	6

Qualifying competition
4	(Serbia) Boris Pašanski	3	2
5	(Netherlands) Boy Westerhof	6	6
