= 2015 Croatia Open Umag – Singles =

Singles
- 2015 Croatia Open Umag

Final
- Champion: (Austria) Dominic Thiem
- Runner-up: (Portugal) João Sousa
- Score: 6–4, 6–1

Details
- Draw: 28 (4 Q / 3 WC )
- Seeds: 8

Events
Singles	Doubles
- Croatia Open

Pablo Cuevas was the last edition champion, but he chose to defend another of his previous title in Båstad which was held simultaneously with the Croatia Open Umag this year.

Dominic Thiem won the title, defeating João Sousa in the final, 6–4, 6–1.

== Seeds ==
The top four seeds receive a bye into the second round.

1. (France) Gaël Monfils (semifinals)
2. (Spain) Roberto Bautista Agut (semifinals)
3. (Italy) Andreas Seppi (second round)
4. (Austria) Dominic Thiem (champion)
5. (Italy) Fabio Fognini (quarterfinals)
6. (Germany) Philipp Kohlschreiber (quarterfinals)
7. (Croatia) Borna Ćorić (quarterfinals)
8. (Slovakia) Martin Kližan (second round)

== Draw ==
Key

- Q = Qualifier
- WC = Wild card
- LL = Lucky loser
- Alt = Alternate
- ITF = ITF entry
- PR = Protected ranking
- SR = Special ranking
- SE = Special exempt
- JE = Junior exempt
- JR = Junior Accelerator Programme entrant
- CO = College Accelerator Programme entrant
- NG = Next Gen Accelerator Program entrant
- w/o = Walkover
- r = Retired
- d = Defaulted

=== Finals ===
Semifinals
1	(France) Gaël Monfils	6	3	1
4	(Austria) Dominic Thiem	1	6	6
(Portugal) João Sousa	4	6	6
2	(Spain) Roberto Bautista Agut	6	2	3

Final
4	(Austria) Dominic Thiem	6	6
(Portugal) João Sousa	4	1

=== Top half ===
First round
Q	(Austria) B Trinker	2	6	6
(Russia) M Youzhny	6	3	3
Q	(Italy) M Trevisan	6	2	5
(Italy) P Lorenzi	1	6	7
(Colombia) S Giraldo	3	2
6	(Germany) P Kohlschreiber	6	6
(Serbia) D Lajović	6	6
Q	(Serbia) L Djere	3	3
Q	(Italy) T Fabbiano	3	4
(Austria) A Haider-Maurer	6	6
(Spain) P Carreño Busta	6^{3}	7^{10}	1
8	(Slovakia) M Kližan	7^{7}	6^{8}	6

Second round
1	(France) G Monfils	6	6
Q	(Austria) B Trinker	3	0
(Italy) P Lorenzi	2	5
6	(Germany) P Kohlschreiber	6	7
4	(Austria) D Thiem	6	3
(Serbia) D Lajović	1	1^{r}
(Austria) A Haider-Maurer	6	6
8	(Slovakia) M Kližan	4	4

Quarterfinals
1	(France) G Monfils	4	7^{7}	6
6	(Germany) P Kohlschreiber	6	6^{5}	4
4	(Austria) D Thiem	6^{5}	6	3
(Austria) A Haider-Maurer	7^{7}	1	0^{r}

Semifinals
1	(France) G Monfils	6	3	1
4	(Austria) D Thiem	1	6	6

=== Bottom half ===
First round
5	(Italy) F Fognini	6	6
(Czech Republic) J Veselý	4	4
(Bosnia and Herzegovina) D Džumhur	6	6
(Czech Republic) L Rosol	3	0
WC	(Croatia) T Androić	2	1
(Portugal) J Sousa	6	6
7	(Croatia) B Ćorić	6	6
(Spain) M Granollers	3	3
WC	(Croatia) M Delić	4	3
(United Kingdom) A Bedene	6	6
WC	(Russia) A Rublev	6^{0}	6	3
(Slovenia) B Kavčič	7^{7}	2	6

Second round
5	(Italy) F Fognini	6	7
(Bosnia and Herzegovina) D Džumhur	3	5
(Portugal) J Sousa	6	6
3	(Italy) A Seppi	2	2
7	(Croatia) B Ćorić	6	6
(United Kingdom) A Bedene	4	4
(Slovenia) B Kavčič	1	2
2	(Spain) R Bautista Agut	6	6

Quarterfinals
5	(Italy) F Fognini	2	6	6^{6}
(Portugal) J Sousa	6	3	7^{8}
7	(Croatia) B Ćorić	3	3
2	(Spain) R Bautista Agut	6	6

Semifinals
(Portugal) J Sousa	4	6	6
2	(Spain) R Bautista Agut	6	2	3

== Qualifying ==
=== Seeds ===
1. (Argentina) Facundo Bagnis (qualifying competition)
2. (Argentina) Máximo González (qualifying competition)
3. (Austria) Gerald Melzer (qualifying competition)
4. (Serbia) Laslo Djere (qualified)
5. (Italy) Thomas Fabbiano (qualified)
6. (Italy) Matteo Viola (first round)
7. (Italy) Roberto Marcora (qualifying competition)
8. (Croatia) Franko Škugor (second round)

=== Qualifiers ===
1. (Italy) Matteo Trevisan
2. (Italy) Thomas Fabbiano
3. (Austria) Bastian Trinker
4. (Serbia) Laslo Djere

=== Qualifying draw ===
==== First qualifier ====
First round
(Italy) Filippo Leonardi	6	6
(Mexico) Santiago González	2	4
(Italy) Matteo Trevisan	7	6
(Brazil) André Sá	5	2
WC	(Croatia) Fran Zvonimir Zgombić	4	4
8	(Croatia) Franko Škugor	6	6

Second round
1	(Argentina) Facundo Bagnis	6	6
(Italy) Filippo Leonardi	3	3
(Italy) Matteo Trevisan	3	6	7^{7}
8	(Croatia) Franko Škugor	6	1	6^{3}

Qualifying competition
1	(Argentina) Facundo Bagnis	6^{3}	6	1
(Italy) Matteo Trevisan	7^{7}	1	6

==== Second qualifier ====
First round
(Brazil) Wilson Leite	6	6
(Slovenia) Mike Urbanija	0	3
(Argentina) Agustín Velotti	6	1
(Serbia) Denis Bejtulahi	3	0^{r}
WC	(Croatia) Stjepan Čagalj	3	2^{r}
5	(Italy) Thomas Fabbiano	6	2

Second round
2	(Argentina) Máximo González	6	6
(Brazil) Wilson Leite	2	4
(Argentina) Agustín Velotti	1	3
5	(Italy) Thomas Fabbiano	6	6

Qualifying competition
2	(Argentina) Máximo González	3	4
5	(Italy) Thomas Fabbiano	6	6

==== Third qualifier ====
First round
WC	(Croatia) Domagoj Bilješko	3	2
(Russia) Dmitry Surchenko	6	6
WC	(Croatia) Patrik Šudić	1	2
(Croatia) Mladen Mitak	6	6
(Austria) Bastian Trinker	6	2	6
6	(Italy) Matteo Viola	4	6	2

Second round
3	(Austria) Gerald Melzer	6	6
(Russia) Dmitry Surchenko	1	3
(Croatia) Mladen Mitak	1	1
(Austria) Bastian Trinker	6	6

Qualifying competition
3	(Austria) Gerald Melzer	6^{2}	2
(Austria) Bastian Trinker	7^{7}	6

==== Fourth qualifier ====
First round
(Croatia) Nikola Mektić	6	7
(Italy) Pietro Licciardi	3	5
(Croatia) Viktor Galović	1	3
(Austria) Michael Linzer	6	6
(Egypt) Sherif Sabry	3	2
7	(Italy) Roberto Marcora	6	6

Second round
4	(Serbia) Laslo Djere	6	7
(Croatia) Nikola Mektić	3	5
(Austria) Michael Linzer	6	4^{r}
7	(Italy) Roberto Marcora	4	4

Qualifying competition
4	(Serbia) Laslo Djere	7	6
7	(Italy) Roberto Marcora	5	3
