= Fabio Fognini career statistics =

Career finals
Discipline	Type	Won	Lost	Total
Singles	Grand Slam	–	–	–
Singles	ATP Finals	–	–	–
Singles	ATP 1000^{1}	1	0	1
Singles	ATP 500	1	2	3
Singles	ATP 250	7	8	15
Singles	Olympics	–	–	–
Singles	Total	9	10	19
Doubles	Grand Slam	1	0	1
Doubles	ATP Finals	–	–	–
Doubles	ATP 1000^{1}	0	3	3
Doubles	ATP 500	1	3	4
Doubles	ATP 250	6	6	12
Doubles	Olympics	–	–	–
Doubles	Total	8	12	20
^{1)} ATP Masters Series" (2004–2008)

This is a list of main career statistics of Italian professional tennis player Fabio Fognini. All statistics are according to the ATP World Tour and ITF websites.

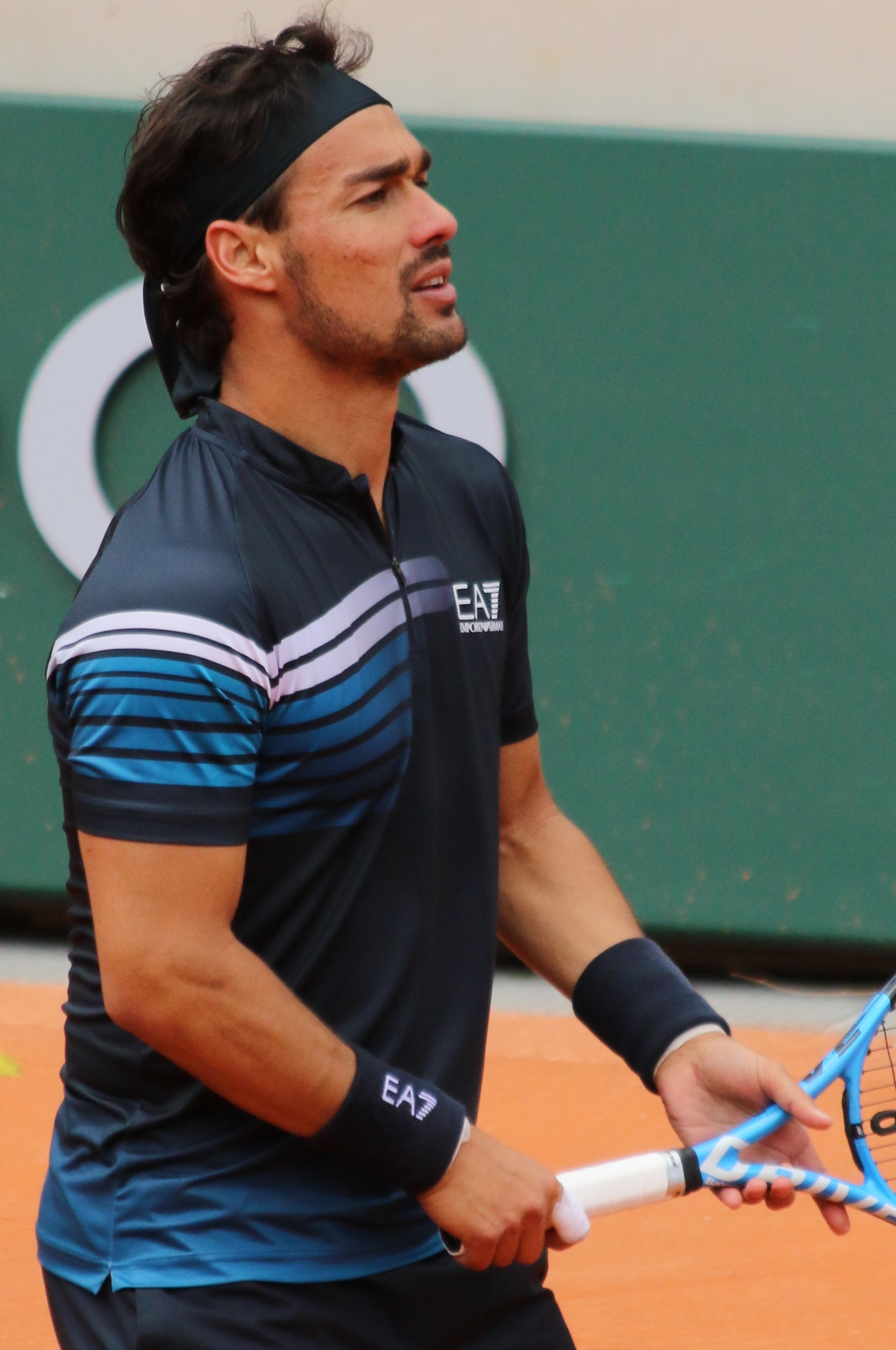
Fognini at the 2019 French Open.

== Performance timelines ==
Key
W	F	SF	QF	#R	RR	Q#	P#	DNQ	A	Z#	PO	G	S	B	NMS	NTI	P	NH

(W) winner; (F) finalist; (SF) semifinalist; (QF) quarterfinalist; (#R) rounds 4, 3, 2, 1; (RR) round-robin stage; (Q#) qualification round; (P#) preliminary round; (DNQ) did not qualify; (A) absent; (Z#) Davis/Fed Cup Zonal Group (with number indication) or (PO) play-off; (G) gold, (S) silver or (B) bronze Olympic/Paralympic medal; (NMS) not a Masters tournament; (NTI) not a Tier I tournament; (P) postponed; (NH) not held; (SR) strike rate (events won / competed); (W–L) win–loss record.
To avoid confusion and double counting, these charts are updated at the conclusion of a tournament or when the player's participation has ended.

Only main-draw results in ATP Tour, Grand Slam tournaments, Davis Cup/ATP Cup/Laver Cup and Olympic Games are included in win–loss records.

=== Singles ===
Tournament	2005	2006	2007	2008	2009	2010	2011	2012	2013	2014	2015	2016	2017	2018	2019	2020	2021	2022	2023	2024	2025	SR	W–L	Win %
Grand Slam tournaments
Australian Open	A	A	Q1	1R	2R	1R	1R	1R	1R	4R	1R	1R	2R	4R	3R	4R	4R	1R	1R	A	A	0 / 16	16–16	50%
French Open	A	A	1R	A	1R	3R	QF (Note: Fognini withdrew prior to his quarterfinal match at the 2011 French Open due to a muscle tear; this is not counted as a loss.)	3R	3R	3R	2R	1R	3R	4R	4R	1R	3R	2R	3R	2R	Q1	0 / 17	27–16	63%
Wimbledon	A	A	A	1R	2R	3R	A	2R	1R	3R	2R	2R	3R	3R	3R	NH	3R	1R	A	3R	1R	0 / 15	18–15	55%
US Open	A	Q1	Q3	1R	1R	1R	2R	3R	1R	2R	4R	2R	1R	2R	1R	A	1R	2R	Q1	1R	A	0 / 15	10–15	40%
Win–loss	0–0	0–0	0–1	0–3	2–4	4–4	5–2	5–4	2–4	8–4	5–4	2–4	5–4	9–4	7–4	3–2	7–4	2–4	2–2	3–3	0–1	0 / 63	71–62	53%
National representation
Summer Olympics	not held			A	not held			1R	not held			3R	not held				3R	not held		A	NH	0 / 3	4–3	57%
Davis Cup	A	A	A	Z1	PO	1R	PO	PO	QF	SF	1R	QF	QF	QF	RR	QF		SF	A	A		0 / 10	23–9	72%
ATP 1000 tournaments
Indian Wells Open	A	A	Q2	2R	1R	2R	1R	A	2R	4R	2R	A	3R	2R	2R	NH	3R	2R	1R	2R	Q1	0 / 14	10–13	43%
Miami Open	A	A	A	A	Q1	1R	1R	A	3R	4R	2R	A	SF	3R	3R	NH	2R	3R	1R	A	A	0 / 11	11–11	50%
Monte-Carlo Masters	A	A	Q1	A	3R	1R	2R	2R	SF	3R	2R	1R	1R	2R	W	NH	QF	2R	A	A	1R	1 / 14	21–13	62%
Madrid Open	A	A	A	1R	2R	1R	Q1	1R	1R	1R	2R	2R	2R	1R	3R	NH	2R	1R	A	A	1R	0 / 14	7–14	33%
Italian Open	Q1	1R	Q2	A	2R	1R	1R	2R	2R	1R	3R	1R	3R	QF	3R	1R	1R	2R	3R	2R	1R	0 / 18	16–18	47%
Canadian Open	A	A	3R	A	A	2R	1R	2R	2R	2R	1R	2R	A	2R	QF	NH	2R	1R	A	A	A	0 / 12	11–12	48%
Cincinnati Open	A	A	A	A	A	Q2	2R	1R	1R	QF	1R	1R	2R	A	A	A	2R	2R	A	A	A	0 / 9	7–9	44%
Shanghai Masters	NH				2R	A	1R	1R	3R	1R	2R	2R	3R	A	QF	NH			1R	2R	A	0 / 11	11–11	50%
Paris Masters	A	A	A	A	A	2R	1R	Q1	2R	2R	1R	1R	A	3R	2R	A	1R	2R	A	1R	A	0 / 11	2–11	15%
Win–loss	0–0	0–1	2–1	1–2	5–5	3–7	2–8	3–6	10–9	10–9	5–9	3–7	13–7	6–7	15–7	0–1	6–8	5–8	2–4	3–4	0–3	1 / 114	96–112	46%
Career statistics
Tournaments	1	5	7	17	26	25	28	24	28	25	25	23	24	25	23	8	22	24	13	14	7	Career total: 396		
Titles	0	0	0	0	0	0	0	0	2	1	0	1	1	3	1	0	0	0	0	0	0	Career total: 9		
Finals	0	0	0	0	0	0	0	2	3	3	2	2	2	4	1	0	0	0	0	0	0	Career total: 19		
Overall win–loss	0–1	2–5	5–7	16–18	20–26	16–26	25–27	22–24	42–27	40–26	32–26	26–23	36–23	46–22	30–24	6–10	22–24	19–23	9–13	12–14	0–7	9 / 394	426–396	52%
Year-end ranking	305	247	95	88	54	55	48	45	16	20	21	49	27	13	12	17	37	56	107	84	–	$19,086,549		

=== Doubles ===
Tournament	2005	2006	2007	2008	2009	2010	2011	2012	2013	2014	2015	2016	2017	2018	2019	2020	2021	2022	SR	W–L	Win %
Grand Slam tournaments
Australian Open	A	A	A	2R	2R	2R	1R	2R	SF	2R	W	2R	1R	2R	A	A	A	QF	1 / 12	20–11	64%
French Open	A	A	A	A	2R	1R	2R	1R	1R	2R	SF	1R	1R	1R	A	A	A	A	0 / 10	7–10	41%
Wimbledon	A	A	A	A	1R	1R	A	1R	1R	2R	1R	1R	1R	A	A	NH	A	A	0 / 8	1–8	11%
US Open	A	A	A	1R	1R	A	SF	1R	2R	1R	1R	2R	3R	2R	A	A	A	3R	0 / 11	11–10	52%
Win–loss	0–0	0–0	0–0	1–2	2–4	1–3	5–3	1–4	5–4	3–4	10–3	2–4	2–3	2–3	0–0	0–0	0–0	5–2	1 / 41	39–39	50%
Year-end championships
ATP Finals	DNQ										RR	DNQ							0 / 1	1–2	33%
National representation
Summer Olympics	NH			A	NH			A	NH			QF	NH				A		0 / 1	2–1	67%
Davis Cup	A	A	A	Z1	PO	1R	PO	PO	QF	SF	1R	QF	QF	QF	RR	QF			0 / 9	9–9	58%
ATP 1000 tournaments
Indian Wells Open	A	A	A	A	A	A	A	A	1R	1R	F	A	A	2R	SF	NH	QF	1R	0 / 7	9–7	60%
Miami Open	A	A	A	A	A	A	A	A	A	1R	2R	A	1R	A	A	NH	1R	SF	0 / 5	4–5	45%
Monte-Carlo Masters	A	A	A	A	A	A	A	1R	1R	2R	F	1R	2R	SF	1R	NH	QF	A	0 / 9	10–9	50%
Madrid Open	A	A	A	A	A	A	A	1R	1R	1R	1R	1R	2R	2R	1R	NH	1R	A	0 / 9	2–9	20%
Italian Open	A	A	A	A	2R	A	SF	1R	1R	1R	2R	1R	A	1R	1R	1R	2R	SF	0 / 12	8–11	40%
Canadian Open	A	A	A	A	A	A	A	2R	1R	2R	2R	A	A	A	1R	NH	1R	2R	0 / 7	4–7	45%
Cincinnati Open	A	A	A	A	A	A	A	A	1R	1R	2R	A	2R	A	A	A	SF	1R	0 / 6	4–6	40%
Shanghai Masters	NH				A	A	2R	1R	2R	1R	F	A	2R	A	A	NH			0 / 6	5–6	45%
Paris Masters	A	A	A	A	A	A	A	A	2R	A	A	A	A	1R	1R	A	1R	2R	0 / 5	2–5	40%
Win–loss	0–0	0–0	0–0	0–0	1–1	0–0	4–2	1–5	2–8	2–8	12–8	0–3	4–5	4–5	3–5	0–1	7–8	7–6	0 / 66	47–65	42%
Career statistics
Titles	0	0	0	0	0	0	1	0	1	0	1	1	0	1	0	0	0	2	Career total: 7		
Finals	0	0	0	1	0	1	1	1	3	0	4	1	0	2	0	0	0	5	Career total: 19		
Overall win–loss	0–0	0–1	0–1	10–10	4–7	5–12	26–16	11–18	23–22	15–21	30–19	8–12	14–18	14–12	6–8	4–5	8–12	38–20	7 / 221	216–214	50%
Year-end ranking	1683	381	499	133	212	138	34	111	36	57	10	174	96	77	148	142	107	23			

== Grand Slam tournament finals ==
=== Doubles: 1 (1 title) ===
Result	Year	Championship	Surface	Partner	Opponents	Score
Win	2015	Australian Open	Hard	(Italy) Simone Bolelli	(France) Pierre-Hugues Herbert (France) Nicolas Mahut	6–4, 6–4

== ATP 1000 tournament finals ==
=== Singles: 1 (1 title) ===
Result	Year	Tournament	Surface	Opponent	Score
Win	2019	Monte-Carlo Masters	Clay	(Serbia) Dušan Lajović	6–3, 6–4

=== Doubles: 3 (3 runner-ups) ===
Result	Year	Tournament	Surface	Partner	Opponents	Score
Loss	2015	Indian Wells Open	Hard	(Italy) Simone Bolelli	(United States) Jack Sock (Canada) Vasek Pospisil	4–6, 7–6^{(3–7)}, [7–10]
Loss	2015	Monte-Carlo Masters	Clay	(Italy) Simone Bolelli	(United States) Bob Bryan (United States) Mike Bryan	6–7^{(3–7)}, 1–6
Loss	2015	Shanghai Masters	Hard	(Italy) Simone Bolelli	(South Africa) Raven Klaasen (Brazil) Marcelo Melo	3–6, 3–6

== ATP career finals ==
=== Singles: 19 (9 titles, 10 runner-ups) ===
Legend Grand Slam (0–0) ATP Finals (0–0) ATP 1000 (1–0) ATP 500 (1–2) ATP 250 (7–8)	Titles by surface Hard (1–4) Clay (8–6) Grass (0–0)	Titles by setting Outdoor (8–7) Indoor (1–3)

Result	W–L	Date	Tournament	Tier	Surface	Opponent	Score
Loss	0–1	Apr 2012	Romanian Open, Romania	ATP 250	Clay	(France) Gilles Simon	4–6, 3–6
Loss	0–2	Sep 2012	St. Petersburg Open, Russia	ATP 250	Hard (i)	(Slovakia) Martin Kližan	2–6, 3–6
Win	1–2	Jul 2013	Stuttgart Open, Germany	ATP 250	Clay	(Germany) Philipp Kohlschreiber	5–7, 6–4, 6–4
Win	2–2	Jul 2013	German Open, Germany	ATP 500	Clay	(Argentina) Federico Delbonis	4–6, 7–6^{(10–8)}, 6–2
Loss	2–3	Jul 2013	Croatia Open, Croatia	ATP 250	Clay	(Spain) Tommy Robredo	0–6, 3–6
Win	3–3	Feb 2014	Chile Open, Chile	ATP 250	Clay	(Argentina) Leonardo Mayer	6–2, 6–4
Loss	3–4	Feb 2014	Argentina Open, Argentina	ATP 250	Clay	(Spain) David Ferrer	4–6, 3–6
Loss	3–5	May 2014	Bavarian Championships, Germany	ATP 250	Clay	(Slovakia) Martin Kližan	6–2, 1–6, 2–6
Loss	3–6	Feb 2015	Rio Open, Brazil	ATP 500	Clay	(Spain) David Ferrer	2–6, 3–6
Loss	3–7	Aug 2015	German Open, Germany	ATP 500	Clay	(Spain) Rafael Nadal	5–7, 5–7
Win	4–7	Jul 2016	Croatia Open, Croatia	ATP 250	Clay	(Slovakia) Andrej Martin	6–4, 6–1
Loss	4–8	Oct 2016	Kremlin Cup, Russia	ATP 250	Hard (i)	(Spain) Pablo Carreño Busta	6–4, 3–6, 2–6
Win	5–8	Jul 2017	Swiss Open, Switzerland	ATP 250	Clay	(Germany) Yannick Hanfmann	6–4, 7–5
Loss	5–9	Sep 2017	St. Petersburg Open, Russia	ATP 250	Hard (i)	(Bosnia and Herzegovina) Damir Džumhur	6–3, 4–6, 2–6
Win	6–9	Mar 2018	Brasil Open, Brazil	ATP 250	Clay (i)	(Chile) Nicolás Jarry	1–6, 6–1, 6–4
Win	7–9	Jul 2018	Swedish Open, Sweden	ATP 250	Clay	(France) Richard Gasquet	6–3, 3–6, 6–1
Win	8–9	Aug 2018	Los Cabos Open, Mexico	ATP 250	Hard	(Argentina) Juan Martín del Potro	6–4, 6–2
Loss	8–10	Sep 2018	Chengdu Open, China	ATP 250	Hard	(Australia) Bernard Tomic	1–6, 6–3, 6–7^{(7–9)}
Win	9–10	April 2019	Monte-Carlo Masters, France	ATP 1000	Clay	(Serbia) Dušan Lajović	6–3, 6–4

=== Doubles: 20 (8 titles, 12 runner-ups) ===
Legend Grand Slam (1–0) ATP Finals (0–0) ATP 1000 (0–3) ATP 500 (1–3) ATP 250 (6–6)	Titles by surface Hard (3–4) Clay (5–8) Grass (0–0)	Titles by setting Outdoor (7–12) Indoor (1–0)

Result	W–L	Date	Tournament	Tier	Surface	Partner	Opponents	Score
Loss	0–1	Jul 2008	Croatia Open, Croatia	International	Clay	(Argentina) Carlos Berlocq	(Slovakia) Michal Mertiňák (Czech Republic) Petr Pála	6–2, 3–6, [5–10]
Loss	0–2	Feb 2010	Mexican Open, Mexico	ATP 500	Clay	(Italy) Potito Starace	(Poland) Łukasz Kubot (Austria) Oliver Marach	0–6, 0–6
Win	1–2	Jul 2011	Croatia Open, Croatia	ATP 250	Clay	(Italy) Simone Bolelli	(Croatia) Marin Čilić (Croatia) Lovro Zovko	6–3, 5–7, [10–7]
Loss	1–3	Apr 2012	Grand Prix Hassan II, Morocco	ATP 250	Clay	(Italy) Daniele Bracciali	(Germany) Dustin Brown (Australia) Paul Hanley	5–7, 3–6
Win	2–3	Feb 2013	Argentina Open, Argentina	ATP 250	Clay	(Italy) Simone Bolelli	(United States) Nicholas Monroe (Germany) Simon Stadler	6–3, 6–2
Loss	2–4	Feb 2013	Mexican Open, Mexico	ATP 500	Clay	(Italy) Simone Bolelli	(Poland) Łukasz Kubot (Spain) David Marrero	5–7, 2–6
Loss	2–5	Oct 2013	China Open, China	ATP 500	Hard	(Italy) Andreas Seppi	(Belarus) Max Mirnyi (Romania) Horia Tecău	4–6, 2–6
Win	3–5	Jan 2015	Australian Open, Australia	Grand Slam	Hard	(Italy) Simone Bolelli	(France) Pierre-Hugues Herbert (France) Nicolas Mahut	6–4, 6–4
Loss	3–6	Mar 2015	Indian Wells Open, US	ATP 1000	Hard	(Italy) Simone Bolelli	(Canada) Vasek Pospisil (United States) Jack Sock	4–6, 7–6^{(7–3)}, [7–10]
Loss	3–7	Apr 2015	Monte-Carlo Masters, France	ATP 1000	Clay	(Italy) Simone Bolelli	(United States) Bob Bryan (United States) Mike Bryan	6–7^{(3–7)}, 1–6
Loss	3–8	Oct 2015	Shanghai Masters, China	ATP 1000	Hard	(Italy) Simone Bolelli	(South Africa) Raven Klaasen (Brazil) Marcelo Melo	3–6, 3–6
Win	4–8	Oct 2016	Shenzhen Open, China	ATP 250	Hard	(Sweden) Robert Lindstedt	(Austria) Oliver Marach (France) Fabrice Martin	7–6^{(7–4)}, 6–3
Loss	4–9	Jul 2018	Swedish Open, Sweden	ATP 250	Clay	(Italy) Simone Bolelli	(Chile) Julio Peralta (Argentina) Horacio Zeballos	3–6, 4–6
Win	5–9	Sep 2018	St. Petersburg Open, Russia	ATP 250	Hard (i)	(Italy) Matteo Berrettini	(Czech Republic) Roman Jebavý (Netherlands) Matwé Middelkoop	7–6^{(8–6)}, 7–6^{(7–4)}
Loss	5–10	Jan 2022	Sydney International, Australia	ATP 250	Hard	(Italy) Simone Bolelli	(Australia) John Peers (Slovakia) Filip Polášek	5–7, 5–7
Loss	5–11	Feb 2022	Argentina Open, Argentina	ATP 250	Clay	(Argentina) Horacio Zeballos	(Mexico) Santiago González (Argentina) Andrés Molteni	1–6, 1–6
Win	6–11	Feb 2022	Rio Open, Brazil	ATP 500	Clay	(Italy) Simone Bolelli	(United Kingdom) Jamie Murray (Brazil) Bruno Soares	7–5, 6–7^{(2–7)}, [10–6]
Loss	6–12	Jul 2022	Swedish Open, Sweden	ATP 250	Clay	(Italy) Simone Bolelli	(Brazil) Rafael Matos (Spain) David Vega Hernández	4–6, 6–3, [11–13]
Win	7–12	Jul 2022	Croatia Open, Croatia	ATP 250	Clay	(Italy) Simone Bolelli	(United Kingdom) Lloyd Glasspool (Finland) Harri Heliövaara	5–7, 7–6^{(8–6)}, [10–7]
Win	8–12	Feb 2023	Argentina Open, Argentina	ATP 250	Clay	(Italy) Simone Bolelli	(Colombia) Nicolás Barrientos (Uruguay) Ariel Behar	6–2, 6–4

== ATP Challenger Tour and ITF Futures finals ==
=== Singles: 16 (11 titles, 5 runner–ups) ===
Legend (singles) ATP Challenger Tour (8–4) ITF Futures Tour (3–1)	Finals by Surface Hard (0–0) Clay (11–5) Grass (0–0)

Result	W–L	Date	Tournament	Tier	Surface	Opponent	Score
Loss	0–1	Jan 2007	Cachantún Cup, Chile	Challenger	Clay	(Argentina) Martín Vassallo Argüello	6–1, 5–7, 4–6
Loss	0–2	May 2007	Sanremo Challenger, Italy	Challenger	Clay	(Italy) Francesco Aldi	5–7, 7–6^{(4)}, 4–6
Loss	0–3	Jun 2007	Schickedanz Open, Germany	Challenger	Clay	(Australia) Peter Luczak	6–4, 2–6, 2–6
Win	1–3	Jul 2008	Sporting Challenger, Italy	Challenger	Clay	(Argentina) Diego Junqueira	6–3, 6–1
Win	2–3	Sep 2008	Genoa Open Challenger, Italy	Challenger	Clay	(Italy) Gianluca Naso	6–4, 6–3
Win	3–3	Jul 2009	Carisap Tennis Cup, Italy	Challenger	Clay	(Argentina) Cristian Villagrán	6–7^{(5)}, 7–6^{(2)}, 6–0
Win	4–3	Sep 2010	AON Open Challenger, Italy	Challenger	Clay	(Italy) Potito Starace	6–4, 6–1
Win	5–3	Oct 2010	Tennislife Cup, Italy	Challenger	Clay	(Serbia) Boris Pashanski	6–4, 4–2 ret.
Win	6–3	Oct 2010	Copa Petrobras Santiago, Chile	Challenger	Clay	(Chile) Paul Capdeville	6–2, 7–6^{(2)}
Loss	6–4	Sep 2023	2023 AON Open Challenger, Italy	Challenger	Clay	(Brazil) Thiago Seyboth Wild	2–6, 6–7^{(3–7)}
Win	7–4	Nov 2023	Copa Faulcombridge, Spain	Challenger	Clay	(Spain) Roberto Bautista Agut	3–6, 7–6^{(10–8)}, 7–6^{(7–3)}
Win	8–4	Nov 2024	Montemar Challenger, Spain	Challenger	Clay	(Austria) Lukas Neumayer	6–3, 2–6, 6–3
Win	1–0	Feb 2005	F1 Murcia, Spain	Futures	Clay	(Croatia) Mario Radic	2–6, 7–5, 6–0
Loss	1–1	Mar 2005	F3 Siracuse, Italy	Futures	Clay	(Romania) Adrian Ungur	5–7, 6–1, 1–6
Win	2–1	Apr 2005	F9 Bergamo, Italy	Futures	Clay	(Austria) Marco Mirnegg	2–6, 6–3, 6–4
Win	3–1	Mar 2006	F4 Siracuse, Italy	Futures	Clay	(Italy) Andrea Arnaboldi	6–3, 6–3

=== Doubles: 3 (1 titles, 2 runner–ups) ===
Legend (doubles) ATP Challenger Tour (1–2)	Finals by Surface Hard (0–0) Clay (1–2) Grass (0–0) Carpet (0–0)

Result	W–L	Date	Tournament	Tier	Surface	Partner	Opponents	Score
Loss	0–1	Apr 2006	Capri Watch Cup, Italy	Challenger	Clay	(Italy) Simone Bolelli	(Czech Republic) Tomáš Cibulec (Poland) Łukasz Kubot	5–7, 6–4, [7–10]
Loss	0–2	Jun 2007	Schickedanz Open, Germany	Challenger	Clay	(Portugal) Fred Gil	(Mexico) Bruno Echagaray (Brazil) André Ghem	6–7^{(1)}, 6–4, [11–13]
Win	1–2	Apr 2018	Copa Petrobras Asunción, Paraguay	Challenger	Clay	(Italy) Paolo Lorenzi	(Argentina) Carlos Berlocq (Argentina) Brian Dabul	6–3, 6–4

== Grand Slam seedings ==
Year	Australian Open	French Open	Wimbledon	US Open
2007	did not qualify	unseeded	did not qualify	did not qualify
2008	unseeded	absent	unseeded	unseeded
2009	unseeded	unseeded	unseeded	unseeded
2010	unseeded	unseeded	unseeded	unseeded
2011	unseeded	unseeded	absent	unseeded
2012	unseeded	unseeded	unseeded	unseeded
2013	unseeded	27th	30th	16th
2014	15th	14th	16th	15th
2015	16th	28th	30th	32nd
2016	20th	32nd	unseeded	unseeded
2017	unseeded	28th	28th	22nd
2018	25th	18th	19th	14th
2019	12th	9th	12th	11th
2020	12th	14th	not held	absent
2021	16th	27th	26th	28th
2022	unseeded	unseeded	unseeded	unseeded
2023	unseeded	unseeded	absent	did not qualify
2024	absent	unseeded	unseeded	unseeded
2025	unseeded			

== Wins over top 10 players ==
- He has a 17–75 record against players who were, at the time the match was played, ranked in the top 10.

Year	2010	2011	2012	2013	2014	2015	2016	2017	2018	2019	2020	2021	2022	2023	2024	Total
Wins	1	0	0	2	1	3	0	3	2	3	0	0	0	1	1	17

#	Player	Rank	Event	Surface	Rd	Score	FF Rank
2010
1.	(Spain) Fernando Verdasco	9	Wimbledon, UK	Grass	1R	7–6^{(11–9)}, 6–2, 6–7^{(6–8)}, 6–4	80
2013
2.	(Czech Republic) Tomáš Berdych	6	Monte-Carlo Masters, France	Clay	3R	6–4, 6–2	32
3.	(France) Richard Gasquet	9	Monte-Carlo Masters, France	Clay	QF	7–6^{(7–0)}, 6–2	32
2014
4.	(United Kingdom) Andy Murray	8	Davis Cup, Italy	Clay	RR	6–3, 6–3, 6–4	13
2015
5.	(Spain) Rafael Nadal	3	Rio Open, Brazil	Clay	SF	1–6, 6–2, 7–5	28
6.	(Spain) Rafael Nadal	4	Barcelona Open, Spain	Clay	3R	6–4, 7–6^{(8–6)}	30
7.	(Spain) Rafael Nadal	8	US Open, United States	Hard	3R	3–6, 4–6, 6–4, 6–3, 6–4	32
2017
8.	(France) Jo-Wilfried Tsonga	8	Indian Wells Open, United States	Hard	2R	7–6^{(7–4)}, 3–6, 6–4	43
9.	(Japan) Kei Nishikori	4	Miami Open, United States	Hard	QF	6–4, 6–2	40
10.	(United Kingdom) Andy Murray	1	Italian Open, Italy	Clay	2R	6–2, 6–4	29
2018
11.	(Austria) Dominic Thiem	8	Italian Open, Italy	Clay	2R	6–4, 1–6, 6–3	21
12.	(Argentina) Juan Martín del Potro	4	Los Cabos Open, Mexico	Hard	F	6–4, 6–2	15
2019
13.	(Germany) Alexander Zverev	3	Monte-Carlo Masters, France	Clay	3R	7–6^{(8–6)}, 6–1	18
14.	(Spain) Rafael Nadal	2	Monte-Carlo Masters, France	Clay	SF	6–4, 6–2	18
15.	(Russia) Karen Khachanov	9	Shanghai Masters, China	Hard	3R	6–3, 7–5	12
2023
16.	(Canada) Félix Auger-Aliassime	10	French Open, France	Clay	1R	6–4, 6–4, 6–3	130
2024
17.	(Norway) Casper Ruud	8	Wimbledon, UK	Grass	2R	6–4, 7–5, 6–7^{(1–7)}, 6–3	94

*As of 3 July 2024

== ATP Tour career earnings ==
Year	Grand Slam	ATP 1000	ATP 500	ATP 250	Challenger	Futures	Total	Prize money ($)	Ranking
2005	0	0	0	0	0	2	2	17.668	417
2006	0	0	0	0	0	1	1	52.110	264
2007	0	0	0	0	0	0	0	126.405	169
2008	0	0	0	0	2	0	2	284.518	104
2009	0	0	0	0	1	0	1	395.679	76
2010	0	0	0	0	4	0	4	424.469	67
2011	0	0	0	1	0	0	1	738.884	41
2012	0	0	0	0	0	0	0	533.149	53
2013	0	0	1	2	0	0	3	1.480.993	18
2014	0	0	0	1	0	0	1	1.230.758	25
2015	1	0	0	0	0	0	1	1.779.408	13
2016	0	0	0	2	0	0	2	782.705	53
2017	0	0	0	1	0	0	1	1.429.055	28
2018	0	0	0	4	0	0	4	2.088.249	15
2019	0	1	0	0	0	0	1	2.895.013	11
2020	0	0	0	0	0	0	0	713,097	37
2021	0	0	0	0	0	0	0	1,277,392	25
2022	0	0	0	2	0	0	2	1,199,767	38
2023	0	0	0	0	0	0	0	620,035	120
2024	0	0	0	0	0	0	0	700,940	107
2025	0	0	0	0	0	0	0	246,729	242
Career	1	1	1	13	7	3	26	19,086,549	40

== Exhibition finals ==
=== Singles ===
Result	Date	Tournament	Surface	Opponent	Score
Loss	Dec 2019	Diriyah Tennis Cup, United Arab Emirates	Hard	(Russia) Daniil Medvedev	2–6, 2–6
