= 2014 ATP Vegeta Croatia Open Umag – Doubles =

Doubles
- 2014 ATP Vegeta Croatia Open Umag
- 2013 Champions: (Slovakia) Martin Kližan (Spain) David Marrero

Final
- Champions: (Czech Republic) František Čermák (Czech Republic) Lukáš Rosol
- Runners-up: (Serbia) Dušan Lajović (Croatia) Franko Škugor
- Score: 6–4, 7–6^{(7–5)}

Details
- Draw: 16
- Seeds: 4

Events
Singles	Doubles
← 2013 ·	Croatia Open	· 2015 →

Martin Kližan and David Marrero were the defending champions, but chose not to participate.
František Čermák and Lukáš Rosol won the title, defeating Dušan Lajović and Franko Škugor in the final, 6–4, 7–6^{(7–5)}.

== Seeds ==
1. (Austria) Julian Knowle / (Austria) Oliver Marach (semifinals)
2. (Uruguay) Pablo Cuevas / (Argentina) Horacio Zeballos (semifinals)
3. (Croatia) Mate Pavić / (Brazil) André Sá (first round)
4. (Czech Republic) František Čermák / (Czech Republic) Lukáš Rosol (champions)

== Draw ==
=== Key ===
- Q = Qualifier
- WC = Wild card
- LL = Lucky loser
- Alt = Alternate
- ITF = ITF entry
- PR = Protected ranking
- SR = Special ranking
- SE = Special exempt
- JE = Junior exempt
- JR = Junior Accelerator Programme entrant
- CO = College Accelerator Programme entrant
- NG = Next Gen Accelerator Program entrant
- w/o = Walkover
- r = Retired
- d = Defaulted

=== Draw ===
First round
1	(Austria) J Knowle (Austria) O Marach	6	6
(Slovenia) A Bedene (United Kingdom) J Delgado	4	3
(Germany) G Kretschmer (Germany) A Satschko	5	1
(Italy) M Cecchinato (Italy) F Fognini	7	6
4	(Czech Republic) F Čermák (Czech Republic) L Rosol	7^{7}	6
(Australia) P Hanley (United Kingdom) J Marray	6^{4}	1
(Spain) P Riba (Portugal) J Sousa	6	4	[10]
(Spain) A Ramos-Viñolas (Argentina) DS Schwartzman	0	6	[5]
(Italy) P Lorenzi (Italy) A Seppi	5	2
(Serbia) D Lajović (Croatia) F Škugor	7	6
(Czech Republic) L Dlouhý (Czech Republic) J Veselý	6	2	[13]
3	(Croatia) M Pavić (Brazil) A Sá	4	6	[11]
WC	(Croatia) T Androić (Croatia) M Čilić	4	6	[2]
(Argentina) G Durán (Russia) T Gabashvili	6	4	[10]
WC	(Croatia) D Marcan (Croatia) N Serdarušić	4	6	[7]
2	(Uruguay) P Cuevas (Argentina) H Zeballos	6	3	[10]

Quarterfinals
1	(Austria) J Knowle (Austria) O Marach	6	6
(Italy) M Cecchinato (Italy) F Fognini	0	3
4	(Czech Republic) F Čermák (Czech Republic) L Rosol	3	6	[10]
(Spain) P Riba (Portugal) J Sousa	6	3	[6]
(Serbia) D Lajović (Croatia) F Škugor	2	6	[10]
(Czech Republic) L Dlouhý (Czech Republic) J Veselý	6	4	[7]
(Argentina) G Durán (Russia) T Gabashvili	6^{5}	1
2	(Uruguay) P Cuevas (Argentina) H Zeballos	7^{7}	6

Semifinals
1	(Austria) J Knowle (Austria) O Marach	4	6	[3]
4	(Czech Republic) F Čermák (Czech Republic) L Rosol	6	3	[10]
(Serbia) D Lajović (Croatia) F Škugor	6^{3}	7	[13]
2	(Uruguay) P Cuevas (Argentina) H Zeballos	7^{7}	5	[11]

Final
4	(Czech Republic) F Čermák (Czech Republic) L Rosol	6	7^{7}
(Serbia) D Lajović (Croatia) F Škugor	4	6^{5}
