= 2013 ATP Vegeta Croatia Open Umag =

- Date: 18–28 July
- Edition: 24th
- Category: ATP World Tour 250
- Draw: 28S/16D
- Prize money: €410,200
- Surface: Clay
- Location: Umag, Croatia

Champions

Singles
- (Spain) Tommy Robredo

Doubles
- (Slovakia) Martin Kližan / (Spain) David Marrero
- Croatia Open

The 2013 ATP Vegeta Croatia Open Umag was a men's tennis tournament played on outdoor clay courts. It was the 24th edition of the ATP Vegeta Croatia Open Umag, and was part of the ATP World Tour 250 Series of the 2013 ATP World Tour. It took place at the International Tennis Center in Umag, Croatia, from 18 July until 28 July 2013. Fifth-seeded Tommy Robredo won the singles title.

== Finals ==
=== Singles ===
(Spain) Tommy Robredo defeated (Italy) Fabio Fognini, 6–0, 6–3

- It was Robredo's 2nd and last singles title of the year and the 12th and last of his career.

=== Doubles ===
(Slovakia) Martin Kližan / (Spain) David Marrero defeated (United States) Nicholas Monroe / (Germany) Simon Stadler, 6–1, 5–7, [10–7]

== Singles main draw entrants ==
=== Seeds ===
Country	Player	Rank^{1}	Seed
FRA	Richard Gasquet	9	1
ITA	Andreas Seppi	24	2
ITA	Fabio Fognini	25	3
UKR	Alexandr Dolgopolov	26	4
ESP	Tommy Robredo	29	5
SVK	Martin Kližan	38	6
GER	Florian Mayer	45	7
ARG	Carlos Berlocq	46	8

- ^{1} Rankings are as of July 15, 2013

=== Other entrants ===
The following players received wildcards into the singles main draw:

- (Croatia) Borna Ćorić
- (Croatia) Mate Pavić
- (Croatia) Antonio Veić

The following players received entry from the qualifying draw:

- (Slovenia) Blaž Kavčič
- (Serbia) Dušan Lajović
- (Croatia) Joško Topić
- (Netherlands) Boy Westerhof

=== Withdrawals ===
Before the tournament

- (Croatia) Marin Čilić (knee injury)
- (Uruguay) Pablo Cuevas
- (Poland) Jerzy Janowicz (right arm injury)
- (Spain) Fernando Verdasco (hand injury)

=== Retirements ===
- (Austria) Andreas Haider-Maurer (lower back strain)
- (Argentina) Horacio Zeballos (intercostal muscle pain)

== Doubles main draw entrants ==
=== Seeds ===
Country	Player	Country	Player	Rank^{1}	Seed
CZE	František Čermák	CZE	Lukáš Dlouhý	81	1
GER	Andre Begemann	GER	Martin Emmrich	86	2
USA	Nicholas Monroe	GER	Simon Stadler	122	3
POL	Tomasz Bednarek	POL	Mateusz Kowalczyk	133	4

- Rankings are as of July 15, 2013

=== Other entrants ===
The following pairs received wildcards into the doubles main draw:

- (Croatia) Borna Ćorić / (Croatia) Nikola Mektić
- (Croatia) Franko Škugor / (Croatia) Antonio Veić

The following pair received entry as alternates:

- (Slovenia) Aljaž Bedene / (Serbia) Dušan Lajović

=== Withdrawals ===
Before the tournament

- (Italy) Fabio Fognini (fatigue)

During the tournament

- (Serbia) Viktor Troicki (personal reasons)
- (Argentina) Horacio Zeballos (intercostal muscle pain)
