= 2016 Croatia Open Umag =

- Date: 18–24 July
- Edition: 27th
- Category: ATP World Tour 250
- Draw: 28S / 16D
- Prize money: €463,520
- Surface: Clay
- Location: Umag, Croatia

Champions

Singles
- (Italy) Fabio Fognini

Doubles
- (Slovakia) Martin Kližan / (Spain) David Marrero
- Croatia Open

The 2016 Croatia Open Umag (also known as the Konzum Croatia Open Umag for sponsorship reasons) was a men's tennis tournament played on outdoor clay courts. It was the 27th edition of the Croatia Open, and part of the ATP World Tour 250 Series of the 2016 ATP World Tour. It took place at the International Tennis Center in Umag, Croatia, from 18 July through 24 July 2016. Fourth-seeded Fabio Fognini won the singles title.

== Finals ==
=== Singles ===
(Italy) Fabio Fognini defeated (Slovakia) Andrej Martin, 6–4, 6–1

- It was Fognini's only singles title of the year and the 4th of his career.

=== Doubles ===
(Slovakia) Martin Kližan / (Spain) David Marrero defeated (Croatia) Nikola Mektić / (Croatia) Antonio Šančić, 6–4, 6–2

== Singles main draw entrants ==
=== Seeds ===
Country	Player	Rank^{1}	Seed
URU	Pablo Cuevas	24	1
POR	João Sousa	30	2
FRA	Jérémy Chardy	34	3
ITA	Fabio Fognini	36	4
ESP	Nicolás Almagro	44	5
ESP	Pablo Carreño Busta	46	6
SVK	Martin Kližan	47	7
CZE	Jiří Veselý	50	8

- ^{1} Rankings are as of July 11, 2016

=== Other entrants ===
The following players received wildcards into the singles main draw:

- (Croatia) Nikola Mektić
- (Croatia) Nino Serdarušić
- (Croatia) Franko Škugor

The following players received entry from the qualifying draw:

- (Serbia) Nikola Čačić
- (Brazil) André Ghem
- (Austria) Michael Linzer
- (Spain) Enrique López-Pérez

The following player received entry as a special exempt:

- (Argentina) Renzo Olivo

=== Retirements ===
- (Croatia) Franko Škugor

== Doubles main draw entrants ==
=== Seeds ===
Country	Player	Country	Player	Rank^{1}	Seed
GBR	Colin Fleming	POL	Mariusz Fyrstenberg	112	1
USA	Nicholas Monroe	NZL	Artem Sitak	115	2
SVK	Andrej Martin	CHI	Hans Podlipnik-Castillo	130	3
CRO	Nikola Mektić	CRO	Antonio Šančić	178	4

- Rankings are as of July 11, 2016

=== Other entrants ===
The following pairs received wildcards into the doubles main draw:

- (Croatia) Tomislav Draganja / (Croatia) Nino Serdarušić
- (Croatia) Dino Marcan / (Croatia) Ante Pavić

The following pair received entry as alternates:

- (Italy) Riccardo Ghedin / (Italy) Alessandro Motti
