= 2013 ATP Vegeta Croatia Open Umag – Doubles =

Doubles
- 2013 ATP Vegeta Croatia Open Umag
- 2012 Champions: (Spain) David Marrero (Spain) Fernando Verdasco

Final
- Champions: (Slovakia) Martin Kližan (Spain) David Marrero
- Runners-up: (United States) Nicholas Monroe (Germany) Simon Stadler
- Score: 6–1, 5–7, [10–7]

Details
- Draw: 16
- Seeds: 4

Events
Singles	Doubles
← 2012 ·	Croatia Open	· 2014 →

David Marrero and Fernando Verdasco were the defending champions, but Verdasco decided not to participate. Marrero successfully defended the title alongside Martin Kližan, defeating Nicholas Monroe and Simon Stadler in the final, 6–1, 5–7, [10–7].

== Seeds ==
1. (Czech Republic) František Čermák / (Czech Republic) Lukáš Dlouhý (quarterfinals)
2. (Germany) Andre Begemann / (Germany) Martin Emmrich (semifinals)
3. (United States) Nicholas Monroe / (Germany) Simon Stadler (final)
4. (Poland) Tomasz Bednarek / (Poland) Mateusz Kowalczyk (first round)

== Draw ==
=== Key ===
- Q = Qualifier
- WC = Wild card
- LL = Lucky loser
- Alt = Alternate
- ITF = ITF entry
- PR = Protected ranking
- SR = Special ranking
- SE = Special exempt
- JE = Junior exempt
- JR = Junior Accelerator Programme entrant
- CO = College Accelerator Programme entrant
- NG = Next Gen Accelerator Program entrant
- w/o = Walkover
- r = Retired
- d = Defaulted

=== Draw ===
First round
1	(Czech Republic) F Čermák (Czech Republic) L Dlouhý	6	7^{7}
PR	(Czech Republic) J Hájek (Czech Republic) J Levinský	2	6^{3}
(Croatia) M Draganja (Croatia) M Pavić	1	4
(Argentina) C Berlocq (Argentina) H Zeballos	6	6
3	(United States) N Monroe (Germany) S Stadler	6	6
(Russia) M Elgin (Germany) P Marx	3	4
Alt	(Slovenia) A Bedene (Serbia) D Lajović	5	4
(Netherlands) T de Bakker (Australia) R Junaid	7	6
(Slovakia) M Kližan (Spain) D Marrero	7	7^{7}
(Austria) J Knowle (Argentina) L Mayer	5	6^{5}
WC	(Croatia) F Škugor (Croatia) A Veić	6	4	[10]
4	(Poland) T Bednarek (Poland) M Kowalczyk	4	6	[6]
WC	(Croatia) B Ćorić (Croatia) N Mektić	6^{2}	1
(Italy) A Seppi (Serbia) V Troicki	7^{7}	6
(Italy) P Lorenzi (Spain) A Ramos	5	0
2	(Germany) A Begemann (Germany) M Emmrich	7	6

Quarterfinals
1	(Czech Republic) F Čermák (Czech Republic) L Dlouhý	4	7^{7}	[6]
(Argentina) C Berlocq (Argentina) H Zeballos	6	6^{4}	[10]
3	(United States) N Monroe (Germany) S Stadler	7	7^{7}
(Netherlands) T de Bakker (Australia) R Junaid	5	6^{1}
(Slovakia) M Kližan (Spain) D Marrero	6	4	[10]
WC	(Croatia) F Škugor (Croatia) A Veić	4	6	[8]
(Italy) A Seppi (Serbia) V Troicki
2	(Germany) A Begemann (Germany) M Emmrich	w/o^{[a]}

Semifinals
(Argentina) C Berlocq (Argentina) H Zeballos
3	(United States) N Monroe (Germany) S Stadler	w/o
(Slovakia) M Kližan (Spain) D Marrero	6	7^{7}
2	(Germany) A Begemann (Germany) M Emmrich	3	6^{1}

Final
3	(United States) N Monroe (Germany) S Stadler	1	7	[7]
(Slovakia) M Kližan (Spain) D Marrero	6	5	[10]

== Notes ==
- ^{a} The team of Viktor Troicki and Andreas Seppi was forced to withdraw from the tournament as a result of an 18-month ban, which Troicki had to serve starting from July 24, 2013.
