= 2016 Croatia Open Umag – Doubles =

Doubles
- 2016 Croatia Open Umag
- 2015 Champions: (Argentina) Máximo González (Brazil) André Sá

Final
- Champions: (Slovakia) Martin Kližan (Spain) David Marrero
- Runners-up: (Croatia) Nikola Mektić (Croatia) Antonio Šančić
- Score: 6–4, 6–2

Details
- Draw: 16
- Seeds: 4

Events
Singles	Doubles
← 2015 ·	Croatia Open	· 2017 →

Máximo González and André Sá were the defending champions, but chose to compete in Kitzbühel and Gstaad, respectively, instead.

Martin Kližan and David Marrero won the title, defeating Nikola Mektić and Antonio Šančić in the final, 6–4, 6–2.

== Seeds ==
1. (United Kingdom) Colin Fleming / (Poland) Mariusz Fyrstenberg (first round)
2. (United States) Nicholas Monroe / (New Zealand) Artem Sitak (semifinals)
3. (Slovakia) Andrej Martin / (Chile) Hans Podlipnik-Castillo (first round)
4. (Croatia) Nikola Mektić / (Croatia) Antonio Šančić (final)

== Draw ==
=== Key ===
- Q = Qualifier
- WC = Wild card
- LL = Lucky loser
- Alt = Alternate
- ITF = ITF entry
- PR = Protected ranking
- SR = Special ranking
- SE = Special exempt
- JE = Junior exempt
- JR = Junior Accelerator Programme entrant
- CO = College Accelerator Programme entrant
- NG = Next Gen Accelerator Program entrant
- w/o = Walkover
- r = Retired
- d = Defaulted

=== Draw ===
First round
1	(United Kingdom) C Fleming (Poland) M Fyrstenberg	4	6	[7]
(Slovakia) M Kližan (Spain) D Marrero	6	3	[10]
WC	(Croatia) T Draganja (Croatia) N Serdarušić	w/o
PR	(Czech Republic) R Jebavý (Czech Republic) J Veselý
3	(Slovakia) A Martin (Chile) H Podlipnik-Castillo	6	4	[5]
(Italy) T Fabbiano (Croatia) F Škugor	2	6	[10]
Alt	(Italy) R Ghedin (Italy) A Motti	4	1
(United Kingdom) A Bedene (Bosnia and Herzegovina) D Džumhur	6	6
PR	(Czech Republic) L Dlouhý (Ukraine) S Stakhovsky	5	4
(Argentina) C Berlocq (Uruguay) P Cuevas	7	6
(Russia) T Gabashvili (India) L Paes	0	2
4	(Croatia) N Mektić (Croatia) A Šančić	6	6
(Portugal) G Elias (Brazil) F Neis	6	6
(Spain) P Carreño Busta (Spain) G García-López	1	3
WC	(Croatia) D Marcan (Croatia) A Pavić	2	1
2	(United States) N Monroe (New Zealand) A Sitak	6	6

Quarterfinals
(Slovakia) M Kližan (Spain) D Marrero	5	6	[10]
WC	(Croatia) T Draganja (Croatia) N Serdarušić	7	4	[7]
(Italy) T Fabbiano (Croatia) F Škugor	7	7^{7}
(United Kingdom) A Bedene (Bosnia and Herzegovina) D Džumhur	5	6^{3}
(Argentina) C Berlocq (Uruguay) P Cuevas	7^{7}	1	[5]
4	(Croatia) N Mektić (Croatia) A Šančić	6^{2}	6	[10]
(Portugal) G Elias (Brazil) F Neis	3	5
2	(United States) N Monroe (New Zealand) A Sitak	6	7

Semifinals
(Slovakia) M Kližan (Spain) D Marrero	6	6
(Italy) T Fabbiano (Croatia) F Škugor	4	1
4	(Croatia) N Mektić (Croatia) A Šančić	7	6
2	(United States) N Monroe (New Zealand) A Sitak	5	2

Final
(Slovakia) M Kližan (Spain) D Marrero	6	6
4	(Croatia) N Mektić (Croatia) A Šančić	4	2
