= 2016 Croatia Open Umag – Singles =

Singles
- 2016 Croatia Open Umag

Final
- Champion: (Italy) Fabio Fognini
- Runner-up: (Slovakia) Andrej Martin
- Score: 6–4, 6–1

Details
- Draw: 28 (4 Q / 3 WC )
- Seeds: 8

Events
| Singles | Doubles |
- Croatia Open

Dominic Thiem was the defending champion, but chose to compete in Kitzbühel instead.

Fabio Fognini won the title, defeating Andrej Martin in the final, 6–4, 6–1.

== Seeds ==
The top four seeds receive a bye into the second round.

1. (Uruguay) Pablo Cuevas (second round)
2. (Portugal) João Sousa (quarterfinals)
3. (France) Jérémy Chardy (quarterfinals)
4. (Italy) Fabio Fognini (champion)
5. (Spain) Nicolás Almagro (first round)
6. (Spain) Pablo Carreño Busta (quarterfinals)
7. (Slovakia) Martin Kližan (second round)
8. (Czech Republic) Jiří Veselý (second round, retired)

== Draw ==
Key

- Q = Qualifier
- WC = Wild card
- LL = Lucky loser
- Alt = Alternate
- ITF = ITF entry
- PR = Protected ranking
- SR = Special ranking
- SE = Special exempt
- JE = Junior exempt
- JR = Junior Accelerator Programme entrant
- CO = College Accelerator Programme entrant
- NG = Next Gen Accelerator Program entrant
- w/o = Walkover
- r = Retired
- d = Defaulted

=== Finals ===
Semifinals
(Portugal) Gastão Elias | 3 | 3
4 | (Italy) Fabio Fognini | 6 | 6
(Argentina) Carlos Berlocq | 6^{4} | 4
(Slovakia) Andrej Martin | 7^{7} | 6

Final
4 | (Italy) Fabio Fognini | 6 | 6
(Slovakia) Andrej Martin | 4 | 1

=== Top half ===
First round
(Portugal) G Elias | 6 | 6
(Spain) G García López | 1 | 2
WC | (Croatia) N Serdarušić | 4 | 2
(Russia) T Gabashvili | 6 | 6
(Italy) A Seppi | 4 | 4
6 | (Spain) P Carreño Busta | 6 | 6
Q | (Brazil) A Ghem | 6 | 6^{4} | 6^{5}
SE | (Argentina) R Olivo | 3 | 7^{7} | 7^{7}
WC | (Croatia) F Škugor | 0 | 1^{r}
(Italy) T Fabbiano | 6 | 4
(Bosnia and Herzegovina) D Džumhur | 6 | 5 | 7
5 | (Spain) N Almagro | 2 | 7 | 5

Second round
1 | (Uruguay) P Cuevas | 6 | 3 | 6^{7}
(Portugal) G Elias | 3 | 6 | 7^{9}
(Russia) T Gabashvili | 4 | 2
6 | (Spain) P Carreño Busta | 6 | 6
4 | (Italy) F Fognini | 6 | 6
SE | (Argentina) R Olivo | 4 | 1
(Italy) T Fabbiano | 6 | 1 | 2
(Bosnia and Herzegovina) D Džumhur | 4 | 6 | 6

Quarterfinals
(Portugal) G Elias | 6 | 6
6 | (Spain) P Carreño Busta | 4 | 4
4 | (Italy) F Fognini | 4 | 6 | 6
(Bosnia and Herzegovina) D Džumhur | 6 | 1 | 1

Semifinals
(Portugal) G Elias | 3 | 3
4 | (Italy) F Fognini | 6 | 6

=== Bottom half ===
First round
8 | (Czech Republic) J Veselý | 6 | 6
Q | (Austria) M Linzer | 3 | 1
(Serbia) F Krajinović | 3 | 1
(Argentina) C Berlocq | 6 | 6
(United Kingdom) A Bedene | 7 | 4 | 4
Q | (Serbia) N Ćaćić | 5 | 6 | 6
7 | (Slovakia) M Kližan | 6 | 7
Q | (Spain) E López Pérez | 2 | 5
(Slovakia) A Martin | 7^{8} | 6
(Ukraine) S Stakhovsky | 6^{6} | 4
WC | (Croatia) N Mektić | 5 | 2
(Argentina) L Mayer | 7 | 6

Second round
8 | (Czech Republic) J Veselý | 5 | 0^{r}
(Argentina) C Berlocq | 7 | 3
Q | (Serbia) N Ćaćić | 2 | 0
3 | (France) J Chardy | 6 | 6
7 | (Slovakia) M Kližan | 6 | 5 | 2
(Slovakia) A Martin | 3 | 7 | 6
(Argentina) L Mayer | 5 | 6^{1}
2 | (Portugal) J Sousa | 7 | 7^{7}

Quarterfinals
(Argentina) C Berlocq | 6 | 6
3 | (France) J Chardy | 4 | 2
(Slovakia) A Martin | 6 | 4 | 6
2 | (Portugal) J Sousa | 3 | 6 | 2

Semifinals
(Argentina) C Berlocq | 6^{4} | 4
(Slovakia) A Martin | 7^{7} | 6

== Qualifying ==
=== Seeds ===
The top two seeds received a bye into the qualifying competition.

1. (Spain) Enrique López Pérez (qualified)
2. (Brazil) André Ghem (qualified)
3. (France) Axel Michon (qualifying competition)
4. (Netherlands) Antal van der Duim (first round, retired)
5. (Spain) Oriol Roca Batalla (first round)
6. (Czech Republic) Marek Michalička (first round)
7. (Czech Republic) Michal Konečný (qualifying round)
8. (Argentina) Juan Pablo Paz (qualifying competition)

=== Qualifiers ===
1. (Spain) Enrique López Pérez
2. (Brazil) André Ghem
3. (Austria) Michael Linzer
4. (Serbia) Nikola Ćaćić

=== Qualifying draw ===
==== First qualifier ====
| First round | | | | Qualifying competition |
| | | | | 1 | (Spain) Enrique López Pérez | 7 | 6 |
| | (Serbia) Danilo Petrović | 0 | 6^{5} | 8 | (Argentina) Juan Pablo Paz | 5 | 4 |
| 8 | (Argentina) Juan Pablo Paz | 6 | 7^{7} |

==== Second qualifier ====
| First round | | | | Qualifying competition |
| | | | | 2 | (Brazil) André Ghem | 2 | 6 | 6 |
| WC | (Croatia) Kristijan Mesaroš | 6 | 6 | WC | (Croatia) Kristijan Mesaroš | 6 | 3 | 1 |
| 6 | (Czech Republic) Marek Michalička | 1 | 2 |

==== Third qualifier ====
First round
3 | (France) Axel Michon | 7^{7} | 4 | 6
(Croatia) Ante Pavić | 6^{2} | 6 | 3
(Austria) Michael Linzer | 6 | 4 | 6
5 | (Spain) Oriol Roca Batalla | 3 | 6 | 1

Qualifying competition
3 | (France) Axel Michon | 2 | 4
(Austria) Michael Linzer | 6 | 6

==== Fourth qualifier ====
First round
4 | (Netherlands) Antal van der Duim | 1^{r}
(Serbia) Nikola Ćaćić | 4
WC | (Croatia) Roko Savin | 6^{5} | 5
7 | (Czech Republic) Michal Konečný | 7^{7} | 7

Qualifying competition
(Serbia) Nikola Ćaćić | 6 | 6
7 | (Czech Republic) Michal Konečný | 3 | 2
