= 2015 Croatia Open Umag – Doubles =

Doubles
- 2015 Croatia Open Umag
- 2014 Champions: (Czech Republic) František Čermák (Czech Republic) Lukáš Rosol

Final
- Champions: (Argentina) Máximo González (Brazil) André Sá
- Runners-up: (Poland) Mariusz Fyrstenberg (Mexico) Santiago González
- Score: 4–6, 6–3, [10–5]

Details
- Draw: 16
- Seeds: 4

Events
Singles	Doubles
← 2014 ·	Croatia Open	· 2016 →

František Čermák and Lukáš Rosol were the defending champions, but Čermák chose not to participate this year. Rosol played alongside Rameez Junaid, but they lost in the semifinals to Máximo González and André Sá.
González and Sá went on to win the title, defeating Mariusz Fyrstenberg and Santiago González in the final, 4–6, 6–3, [10–5].

== Seeds ==
1. (Croatia) Marin Draganja / (Finland) Henri Kontinen (semifinals)
2. (United Kingdom) Dominic Inglot / (Germany) Philipp Petzschner (first round)
3. (Poland) Mariusz Fyrstenberg / (Mexico) Santiago González (final)
4. (Spain) Pablo Carreño Busta / (Spain) Marcel Granollers (first round)

== Draw ==
=== Key ===
- Q = Qualifier
- WC = Wild card
- LL = Lucky loser
- Alt = Alternate
- ITF = ITF entry
- PR = Protected ranking
- SR = Special ranking
- SE = Special exempt
- JE = Junior exempt
- JR = Junior Accelerator Programme entrant
- CO = College Accelerator Programme entrant
- NG = Next Gen Accelerator Program entrant
- w/o = Walkover
- r = Retired
- d = Defaulted

=== Draw ===
First round
1	(Croatia) M Draganja (Finland) H Kontinen	7^{12}	6
(Germany) F Moser (Canada) A Shamasdin	6^{10}	4
(Czech Republic) R Jebavý (Czech Republic) J Veselý	6	3	[10]
(Spain) R Bautista Agut (Spain) D Marrero	4	6	[12]
3	(Poland) M Fyrstenberg (Mexico) S González	6^{3}	6	[12]
(Poland) M Kowalczyk (Slovakia) I Zelenay	7^{7}	4	[10]
WC	(Croatia) D Marcan (Croatia) A Šančić	6	6
(United Kingdom) A Bedene (Austria) D Thiem	4	4
WC	(France) P Mamata (France) G Monfils	2	2
(Australia) R Junaid (Czech Republic) L Rosol	6	6
(Belarus) A Bury (Austria) O Marach	6	6
4	(Spain) P Carreño Busta (Spain) M Granollers	4	3
(Austria) J Knowle (Austria) P Oswald	7^{8}	6
(Italy) P Lorenzi (Italy) A Seppi	6^{6}	3
(Argentina) M González (Brazil) A Sá	6	6
2	(United Kingdom) D Inglot (Germany) P Petzschner	4	4

Quarterfinals
1	(Croatia) M Draganja (Finland) H Kontinen	6^{5}	7^{7}	[10]
(Spain) R Bautista Agut (Spain) D Marrero	7^{7}	6^{3}	[7]
3	(Poland) M Fyrstenberg (Mexico) S González	6	4	[10]
WC	(Croatia) D Marcan (Croatia) A Šančić	1	6	[7]
(Australia) R Junaid (Czech Republic) L Rosol	6	4	[10]
(Belarus) A Bury (Austria) O Marach	4	6	[5]
(Austria) J Knowle (Austria) P Oswald	6^{6}	6	[7]
(Argentina) M González (Brazil) A Sá	7^{8}	4	[10]

Semifinals
1	(Croatia) M Draganja (Finland) H Kontinen	4	2
3	(Poland) M Fyrstenberg (Mexico) S González	6	6
(Australia) R Junaid (Czech Republic) L Rosol	4	6	[9]
(Argentina) M González (Brazil) A Sá	6	3	[11]

Final
3	(Poland) M Fyrstenberg (Mexico) S González	6	3	[5]
(Argentina) M González (Brazil) A Sá	4	6	[10]
