= Joško Topić =

Croatian tennis player

- Country (sports): Croatia
- Born: December 8, 1983 (age 41)
- Prize money: $44,529

Singles
- Career record: 0–1
- Career titles: 0; 0 Challenger, 1 Futures
- Highest ranking: No. 543 (29 July 2013)

Doubles
- Career record: 1–2
- Career titles: 0; 0 Challenger, 10 Futures
- Highest ranking: No. 405 (11 June 2006)

Joško Topić (born December 8, 1983) is a retired Croatian professional tennis player.

Topić has a career high ATP singles ranking of 543 achieved on 29 July 2013. He also has a career high ATP doubles ranking of 405, achieved on 11 June 2006. Topić has won 1 ITF singles titles and 10 doubles titles. He played his only ATP Tour main draw match at the 2013 ATP Vegeta Croatia Open Umag, where he lost at the first round against Carlos Berlocq.

== Future and Challenger finals ==
=== Singles: 1 (1–0) ===
Legend (singles) ATP Challenger Tour (0–0) ITF Futures Tour (1–0)	Titles by surface Hard (0–0) Clay (1–0) Grass (0–0) Carpet (0–0)

Result	W–L	Date	Tournament	Tier	Surface	Opponent	Score
Win	1–0	Jun 2013	Bosnia and Herzegovina F3, Doboj	Futures	Clay	(Croatia) Duje Kekez	6–4, 6–2
