= Bastian Trinker =

Austrian tennis player

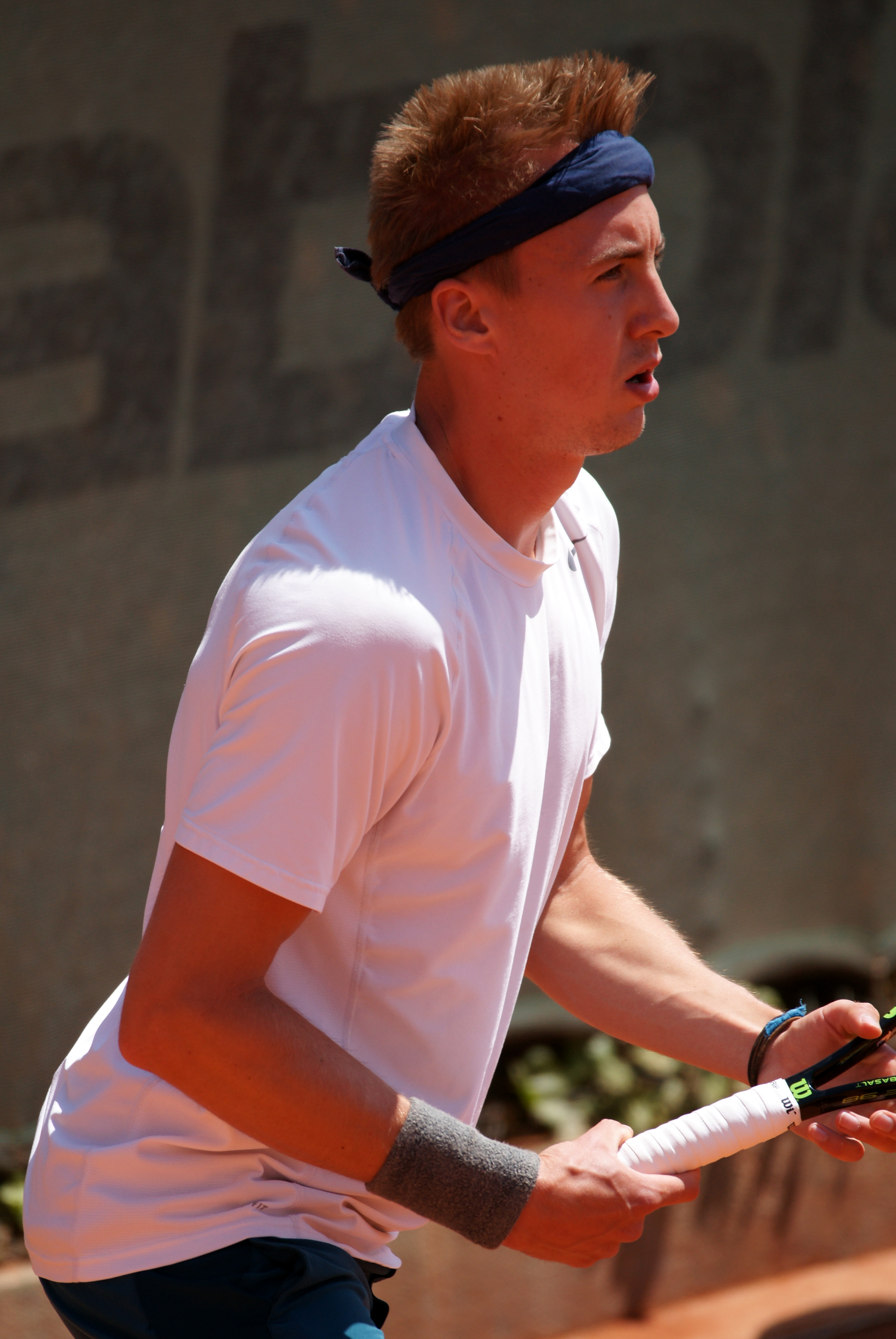
- Bastian Trinker, 2015
- Full name: Bastian Trinker
- Country (sports): Austria
- Born: 11 May 1990 (age 35) Austria
- Height: 1.91 m (6 ft 3 in)
- Plays: Right-handed (one-handed backhand)
- Prize money: $ 101,527

Singles
- Career record: 1–2
- Career titles: 0
- Highest ranking: No. 241 (21 December 2015)

Grand Slam singles results
- Australian Open: Q1 (2016)

Doubles
- Career record: 0–0
- Career titles: 0
- Highest ranking: No. 587 (21 April 2014)

Bastian Trinker (born 11 May 1990) is an Austrian professional tennis player. He competes mainly in the ITF circuit, where he has eight singles titles and three doubles titles.

He played his first ATP main draw match at the 2015 BMW Open after gaining entry as a lucky loser. In the same year he won his first ATP Tour match in Umag, where he won the qualification and then beat the former top-10 player Mikhail Youzhny in the first round.
