= Fabio Fognini =

Italian tennis player (born 1987)

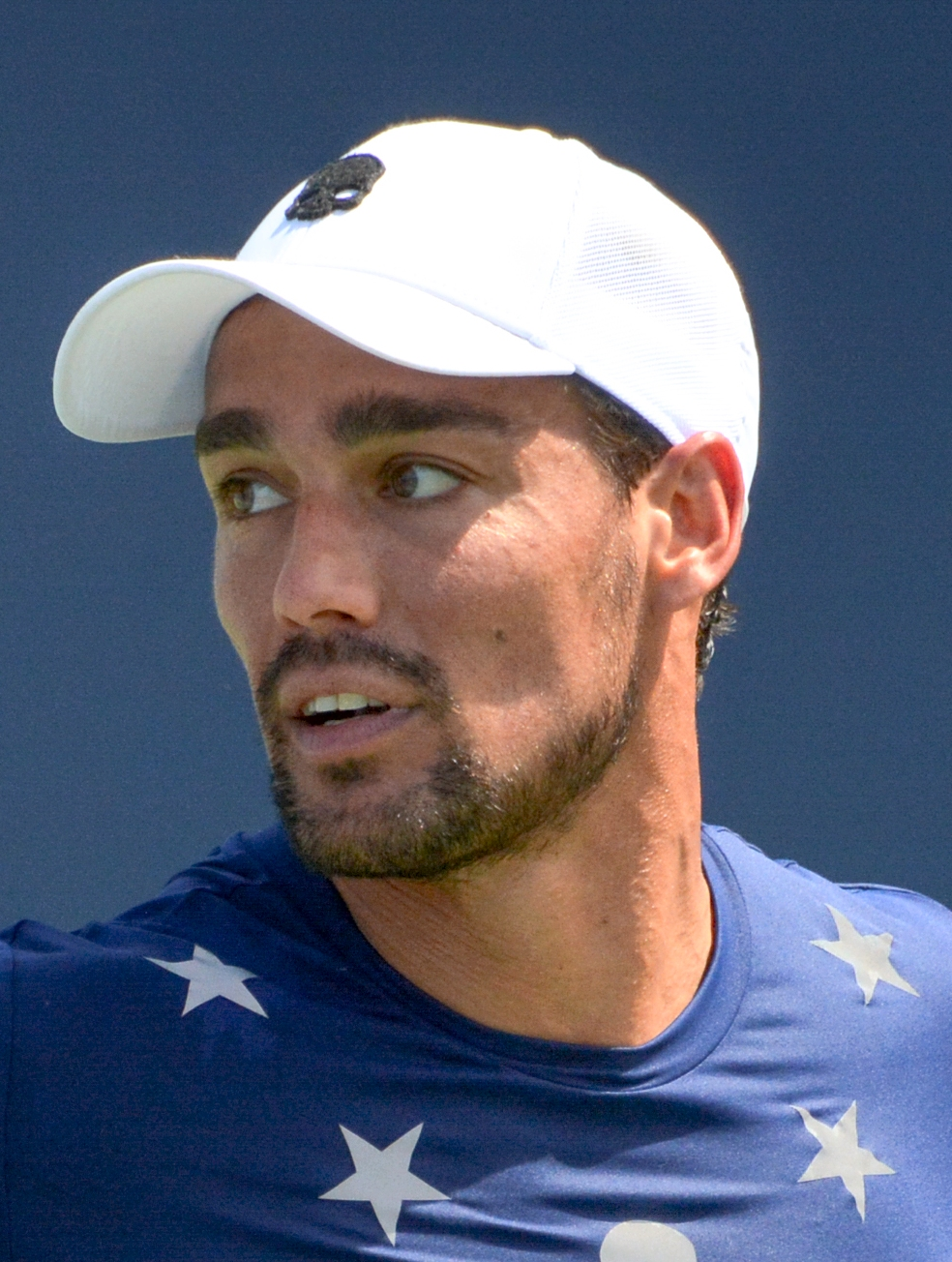
- Fognini playing in the 2018 US Open
- Country (sports): Italy
- Residence: Arma di Taggia, Italy
- Born: 24 May 1987 (age 39) Sanremo, Italy
- Height: 1.78 m (5 ft 10 in)
- Turned pro: 2004
- Retired: 9 July 2025
- Plays: Right-handed (two-handed backhand)
- Coach: Filippo Baldi
- Prize money: US$19,086,549: 42nd in all–time earnings

Singles
- Career record: 426–396
- Career titles: 9
- Highest ranking: No. 9 (15 July 2019)

Grand Slam singles results
- Australian Open: 4R (2014, 2018, 2020, 2021)
- French Open: QF (2011)
- Wimbledon: 3R (2010, 2014, 2017, 2018, 2019, 2021, 2024)
- US Open: 4R (2015)

Other tournaments
- Olympic Games: 3R (2016, 2021)

Doubles
- Career record: 224–221
- Career titles: 8
- Highest ranking: No. 7 (20 July 2015)

Grand Slam doubles results
- Australian Open: W (2015)
- French Open: SF (2015)
- Wimbledon: 2R (2014)
- US Open: SF (2011)

Other doubles tournaments
- Tour Finals: RR (2015)
- Olympic Games: QF (2016)

Grand Slam mixed doubles results
- Australian Open: 2R (2013, 2016)
- Wimbledon: 2R (2012, 2013)

Team competitions
- Davis Cup: SF (2014, 2022); Record: 35–20

Fabio Fognini (Italian pronunciation: [ˈfaːbjo foɲˈɲiːni]; born 24 May 1987) is an Italian former professional tennis player. He has a career-high ATP ranking of world No. 9 achieved on 15 July 2019. Fognini's most successful surface is red clay, where he has won eight of his nine ATP singles titles, most notably at the 2019 Monte-Carlo Masters. He also reached the quarterfinals of the 2011 French Open. Together with Simone Bolelli, Fognini won the 2015 Australian Open doubles championship, becoming the first all-Italian men's pair to win a Grand Slam title in the Open Era. He entered the top 10 at 33 years old, holding the record of the oldest player to become a top ten.

== Early life ==
Fognini was born to Silvana and Fulvio, a businessman, and has a younger sister. He began playing tennis when he was four years old and is also a fan of football, supporting Inter Milan and Genoa CFC. He also enjoys motorbike racing and is a fan of Valentino Rossi. Fognini speaks Italian, English, Spanish, and French.

== Career ==
=== Juniors ===
As a junior, Fognini posted a singles win–loss record of 72–36. He achieved a combined ranking of No. 8 in the world in May 2004, reaching the quarterfinals of both the Australian Open and French Open.

=== 2004–2006 ===
Fognini began his professional career by playing a variety of Futures and Challenger tournaments, winning his first Futures title in 2005 at Spain No. 1 and another at Italy No. 9. In 2005, he also finished runner-up at Italy No. 3 and qualified for his first ATP Challenger tournament at Palermo. During 2006, Fognini had moderate success at Challengers and, after qualifying, made his debut on the ATP World Tour at Buenos Aires. He was defeated in the first round by former World No. 1 Carlos Moyá, the eventual champion.

=== 2007: Top 100 ===
In 2007, Fognini made some real progress on the ATP Tour, notably when he qualified for the 2007 French Open to make his first appearance in a Grand Slam event. He lost in the first round to World No. 35 Juan Mónaco in five sets. In addition, he had a fantastic tournament at the 2007 Rogers Masters in Montreal, Canada. Having qualified for the tournament, he defeated Peter Polansky in the first round, before taking out the 13th seed Andy Murray in straight sets. Fognini was halted by World No. 1 Roger Federer in the third round.

On the ATP Challengers circuit, Fognini made the finals in Santiago, Sanremo, and Fürth, losing in three-set battles each time. Partnering Frederico Gil, he also lost in the doubles final of the Fürth Challenger. He finished the year ranked in the top 100 for the first time at No. 94.

=== 2008: First doubles final ===
Fognini lost a five-set first-round encounter against Michael Russell in the 2008 Australian Open.

During the South American clay swing, he reached the quarterfinals of Viña del Mar (defeating second seed clay-court specialist Juan Ignacio Chela in the first round) and the semi-finals of Costa Do Sauipe.

After missing the 2008 French Open due to injury problems, Fognini reached the semi-finals of both Warsaw and Umag (beating former World No. 1 and French Open champion Carlos Moyá), whilst also winning the Turin and Genova challengers, further enhancing his clay pedigree.

=== 2009: San Benedetto title ===
In April 2009, Fognini reached the third round of the 2009 Monte-Carlo Masters as a qualifier, upsetting Tomáš Berdych (after losing the first set 1–6) and 14th seed Marin Čilić (losing only two games in the match). Fognini then played a typically topsy-turvy match with World No. 4 Andy Murray, losing in two tight sets after being up 5–0 in the first set. In July, Fognini won the San Benedetto Challenger title defeating Cristian Villagrán in the final.

=== 2010: 50 wins ===
A remarkable win during this season was against the 13th seed Gaël Monfils at the 2010 French Open by also coming from two sets to love down in a match that spanned two days. In June 2010, Fognini followed up his vein of good form as he defeated Fernando Verdasco, the 8th seed, in the first round of Wimbledon without dropping serve the entire match.

=== 2011: Major quarterfinal ===
In 2011 Fognini achieved a number of breakthroughs. He reached the quarterfinals of a Grand Slam event for the first time at the 2011 French Open. He defeated Denis Istomin in the first round and qualifier Stéphane Robert in the second. In the third round, Fognini beat Guillermo García López, the 30th seed, in four sets to advance to his first Grand Slam fourth round. Here, he made the quarterfinals in dramatic fashion as he beat Spaniard Albert Montañés in a match lasting 4 hours and 22 minutes. Barely able to walk at the end, Fognini eventually prevailed and clinched the epic match 11–9 in the fifth set. After the match, he described his run at the French Open as a "little dream", maintaining that he "would love to play the next match ... even if I'm only at 50 percent". He was due to face World No. 2 Novak Djokovic in the quarterfinals but, prior to the match, he announced that he had made the "difficult" decision to withdraw on doctors' advice that it would be "dangerous" to play. Nonetheless, Fognini became the first Italian man in the French Open quarterfinals since 1995 and the first to reach that stage at a Grand Slam since 1998. His achievement saw him rise to a then career-high singles ranking of World No. 32.

With Simone Bolelli, Fognini reached the semi-finals of the 2011 US Open men's doubles.

=== 2012: First ATP finals ===
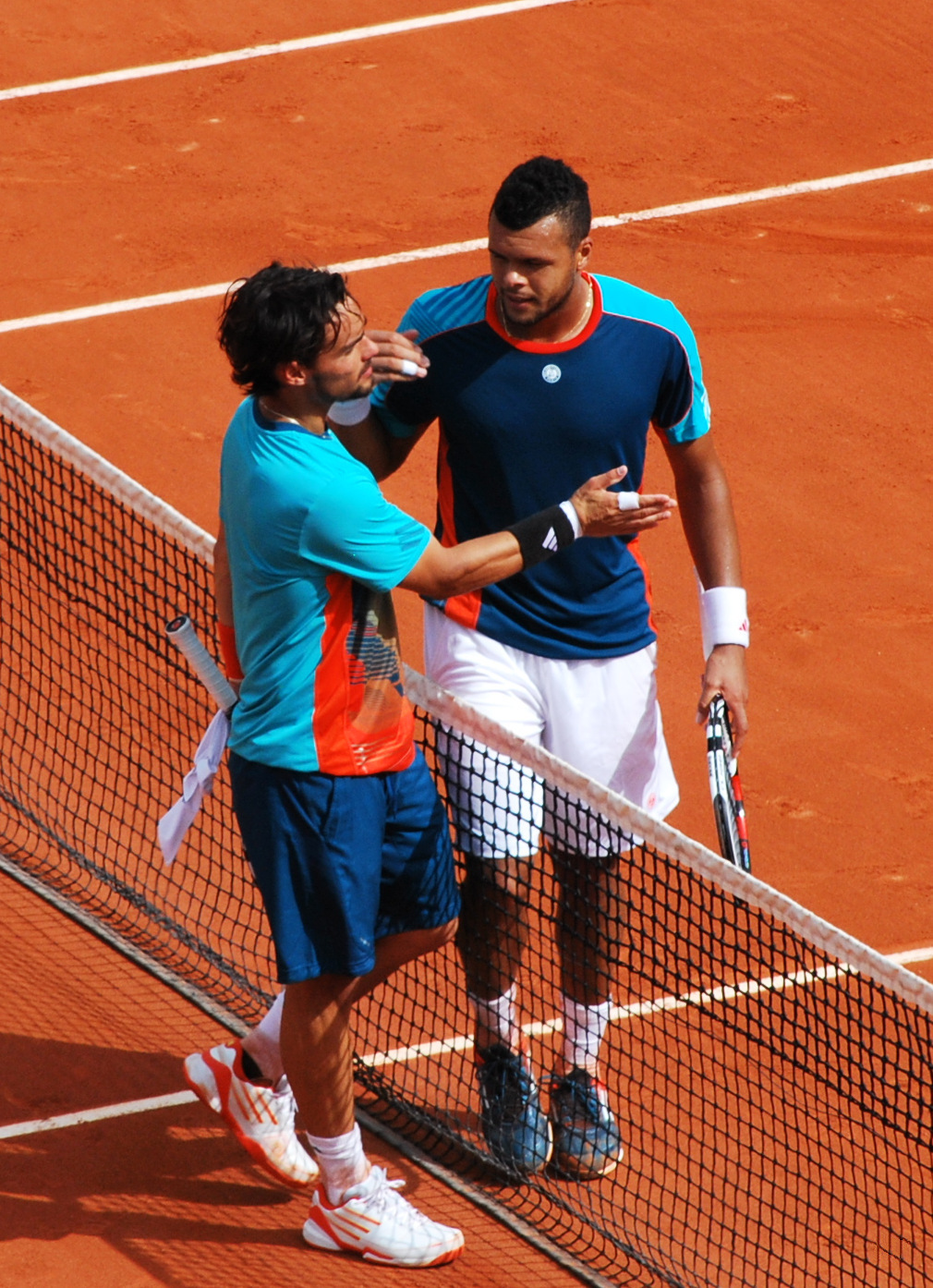
Fognini and Jo-Wilfried Tsonga in 2012 French Open

After numerous ATP semi-final appearances, Fognini finally reached his first career final at Bucharest in April 2012, ousting fifth seed Marcos Baghdatis and sixth seed Andreas Seppi along the way. He finished runner-up to top seed Gilles Simon.

At the 2012 French Open, he was once again the subject of much drama, saving two match points while battling past the seeded Viktor Troicki in five sets to advance to the third round for the third successive year. He subsequently lost to World No. 5 Jo-Wilfried Tsonga in a match with considerable shot-making flair and variety. In the Croatia Open, Fabio lost to defending champion Alexandr Dolgopolov of Ukraine in the second round.

Fognini began his grass season by reaching the quarterfinals of Eastbourne, defeating fourth seed Bernard Tomic along the way, and falling to eventual tournament winner Andy Roddick in a tight three-set match. At Wimbledon, he defeated experienced grass-courter Michaël Llodra in the first round and again lost to the eventual tournament winner, Roger Federer, in the second round. In the London 2012 Olympics, Fognini was drawn against Novak Djokovic in the first round. He valiantly took the first set after being down 3–5 and saving three set points, before finally succumbing in three sets.

Starting the North American summer outdoor hard-court season by qualifying for both the Toronto and Cincinnati Masters, Fognini went on to reach the third round of the US Open, a career-best performance. In the first round, he ousted Édouard Roger-Vasselin in a trademark five-setter, coming back from two sets down. The second round was a routine straight-sets win over Guillermo García López. Fognini's run again ended at the hands of crowd favourite Andy Roddick in a dramatic match (in which he notably out-aced the American) in four sets. Roddick had announced after his first-round win that he was retiring upon conclusion of the tournament, adding to the drama.

The start of the indoor hard-court season saw Fognini reach his second final of the year at St. Petersburg, finishing runner-up to Martin Kližan.

=== 2013: ATP titles and top 20 ranking ===
Fognini was defeated by Roberto Bautista Agut in five sets in the first round of the 2013 Australian Open. He and Bolelli embarked on another deep Grand Slam run in the doubles, reaching the semi-finals, where they lost to the World No. 1 pair, Bob and Mike Bryan.

He reached his first singles quarterfinal of the season at Buenos Aires, losing to top seed David Ferrer in straight sets (whilst winning the doubles alongside Bolelli). The next week, Fognini achieved a career-best performance at ATP 500 events with a semi-finals showing in Acapulco, defeating Stanislas Wawrinka along the way and again losing to Ferrer (but this time taking a set). Just over a week later, Fognini set up a clash with World No. 1 Novak Djokovic, after defeating Aljaž Bedene for the second time in three weeks to reach the second round of the Indian Wells Masters. After being bagelled in the first, Fognini wildly celebrated upon winning his first game in the second, heroically taking the set from 2–4 down. He subsequently lost the third. In Miami, Fognini was seeded at a Masters event for the first time in his career, earning a bye to the second round. He defeated Michaël Llodra, and lost to Ferrer again in the third round.

The start of the European clay season saw Fognini gain another top 20 victory, defeating fellow Italian Andreas Seppi in the first round of the Monte Carlo Masters in a typically tumultuous affair with an almost complete lack of momentum. He carried on his rich vein of form to straight-set both Albert Ramos and No. 4 seed Tomáš Berdych (his second victory over the Czech in Monte Carlo) to reach his first career quarterfinal in a Masters event. Here, Fognini played another amazing match to beat Richard Gasquet, his second consecutive top-10 victory, in straight sets to reach the semi-finals of a Masters for the first time, projecting his ranking to a new career-high of World No. 24. In the semi-finals, he failed to gain any real rhythm, losing to World No. 1 Djokovic. In Madrid, Fognini was involved in another highly unorthodox match, losing in a final set tiebreak to Mikhail Youzhny in the first round. He served for the match in the third set and three match points. Fognini then lost nine consecutive points, only to save two match points himself. In the tiebreak, he went up a minibreak, lost five consecutive points, won four consecutively then lost. At the French Open, he lost in the third round to eventual champion Rafael Nadal.

Fognini began his grass-court season at the 2013 Aegon International held at Eastbourne, where he was seeded eighth. He defeated Grega Žemlja and Martin Kližan, both from a set down, before falling to Ivan Dodig in the quarterfinals. At Wimbledon, Fognini lost in the first round to Jürgen Melzer, after leading by a set and a break.

At the 2013 MercedesCup in Stuttgart, Fognini reached his third career final, defeating top seed and home favourite Tommy Haas en route. He won his maiden title, by beating second seed, Philipp Kohlschreiber, in three sets. The following week, after an outstanding performance at 2013 International German Open, Fognini improved his winning streak to 10 consecutive wins, entering the ATP top 20 for the first time (also regaining the Italian No. 1 spot). He defeated Albert Ramos, Marcel Granollers and hometown hero Tommy Haas for the second time in two weeks to reach the semi-finals. Here, Fognini beat Nicolás Almagro in straight sets to reach a consecutive ATP World Tour final, the first one in an ATP 500 tournament. He won the title by beating qualifier Federico Delbonis in three sets, recovering from 1–4 down in the second set and saving three match points in the second set tiebreak. He reached his third tour final in as many weeks at Umag, defeating Thiemo de Bakker, Martin Kližan and Gaël Monfils en route. The latter saw Fognini serving for the match having won the first five games, then losing six straight games, and then winning in a tiebreak. His 13-match winning streak was ended in the final by Tommy Robredo, whilst his ranking rose to a new career-high of World No. 16.

Seeded No. 14 in Cincinnati, Fognini was down a set and four games to Radek Štěpánek. He proceeded to mount a comeback to four-all, and serving to stay in the match, he served two double faults, received a point penalty for ball abuse and then casually committed consecutive foot faults to get broken to love and lose the match.

At the Asian hardcourt leg, Fognini reached the quarterfinals of Beijing, defeating resurgent veterans Tommy Robredo and Lleyton Hewitt (the latter for the loss of only 2 games). In the quarters, he was dominating World No. 2 Rafael Nadal by a set and three love, before eventually losing in three sets. In the following weeks, he again defeated Robredo en route to the third round of the Shanghai Masters and reached the quarterfinals of Vienna and Valencia.

=== 2014: Third ATP title ===
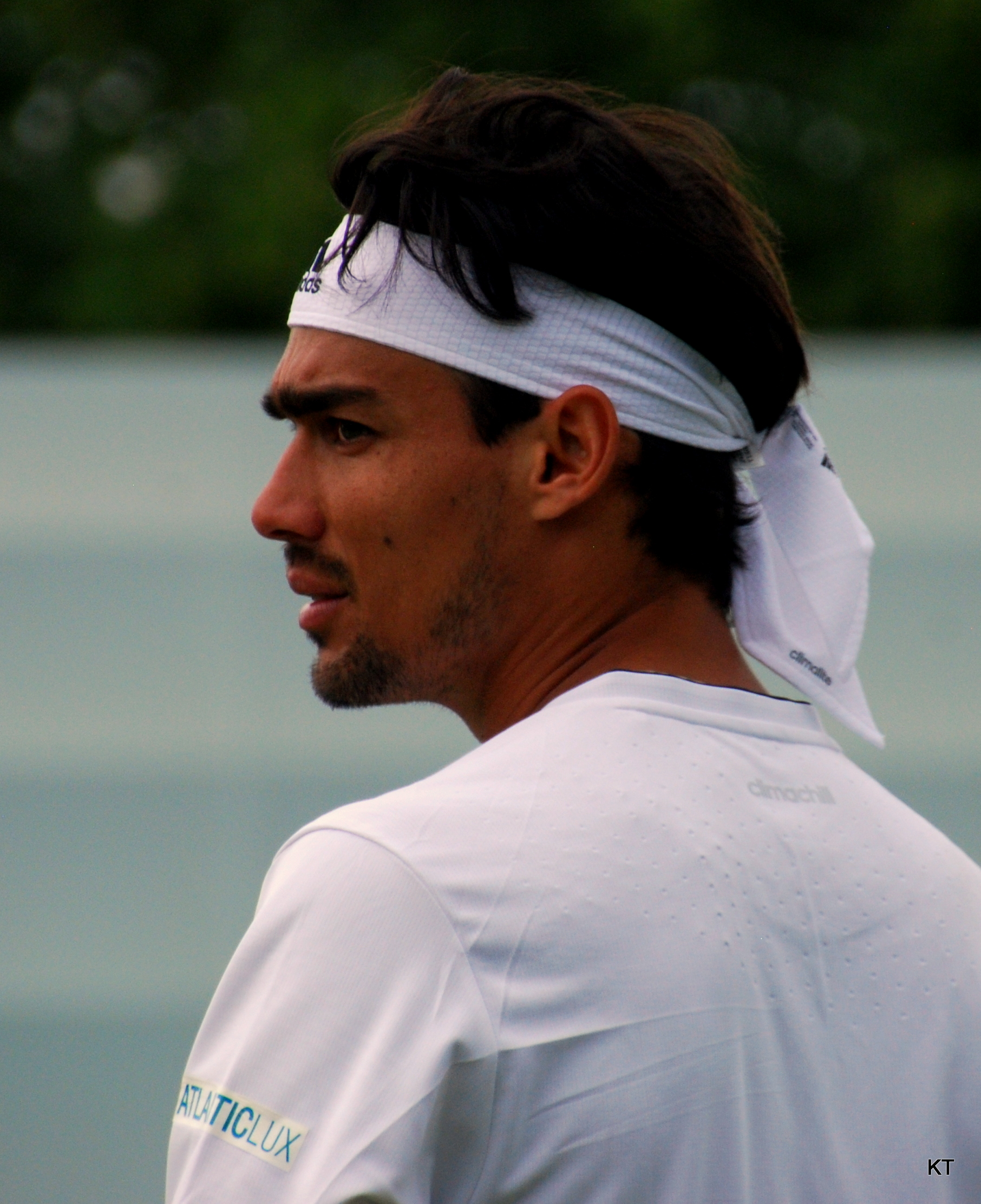
Fognini in 2014 Wimbledon

At the Australian Open, Fognini was seeded 15th. He reached a career-best performance of the fourth round, defeating Alex Bogomolov Jr., Jarkko Nieminen and Sam Querrey, before falling to three-time defending champion Novak Djokovic.

As the top seed at the Chile Open in Viña del Mar, he reached his first singles final of the season (and fourth consecutive in clay tournaments) defeating Aljaž Bedene, Jérémy Chardy and 3rd seed Nicolás Almagro en route. The latter was a classically unorthodox affair, with Fognini leading 5–2 in the final set, squandering two match points, only to eventually win in a tiebreak. He defeated Leonardo Mayer in the final, converting his fifth match point for his third career title. He then won the quarterfinal Davis Cup rubber for Italy against Great-Britain, defeating Andy Murray on clay in straight sets. This took Fabio's record on clay to 19–1 since the French Open and resulted in yet another leap in the rankings, to a new career-high of World No. 14.

Fognini was fined a then record $27,500 (£21,600) at Wimbledon for a series of offences during a first-round match.

=== 2015: Australian Open Doubles win ===
Fognini started his 2015 season at the Hopman Cup, partnering Flavia Pennetta. Italy failed to reach the final, finishing at the bottom of their group. The following week, he played at the Apia International Sydney as the top seed, but was unlucky to draw defending champion Juan Martín del Potro, who was returning from an eleven-month injury lay-off, in his first match. He lost in three sets. Fognini won his first Grand Slam at the 2015 Australian Open doubles alongside Simone Bolelli, with a straight-sets win over Pierre-Hugues Herbert and Nicolas Mahut in the final. He beat Rafael Nadal in the Semi-finals of the Rio Open before losing in the final to David Ferrer. In April, he beat Rafael Nadal again in the third round of the Barcelona Open, but he again lost in the next round to Pablo Andújar. In May, after defeating Steve Johnson and Grigor Dimitrov, he lost to Tomáš Berdych in the third round of the Rome Masters. At the German Open in Hamburg, Fognini reached the final, but was beaten 5–7, 5–7 by Rafael Nadal, in a match that lasted 2 hours and 34 minutes and saw 12 breaks of serve in the 24 games played. At the US Open, Fognini beat Steve Johnson and Pablo Cuevas to advance to the third round where he caused a major upset, beating Rafael Nadal in five sets, coming from two sets and a break of serve down in both the third and fourth sets. In that match, Nadal won the first two sets, and previously had been 151–0 in Grand Slam matches that he led two sets to none. Earning 70 winners, Fognini ended up beating Nadal in five sets. He subsequently lost his fourth round match against Feliciano López.

=== 2016: Fourth title and Rio Olympics ===
Fognini won his fourth ATP title at July's 2016 Croatia Open at Umag. He also reached the third round of the 2016 Rio Olympics where he pushed the then world no. 2 and defending Olympic champion, Andy Murray, to three sets.

=== 2017: Fifth title, tournament suspension ===
Fognini went to the semi-finals of Miami before losing in straight sets to Rafael Nadal. He rounded off strong finishes in the clay-court season including a defeat of world No. 1, Andy Murray. At Wimbledon, Fognini reached the third round, where he faced Murray again. This time Murray won in four sets, despite Fognini leading 5–1 in the fourth set. Fognini also captured the trophy in Gstaad over German qualifier Yannick Hanfmann.

At the US Open, after a first round loss to Stefano Travaglia, Fognini was immediately suspended from the tournament for unsportsmanlike conduct, specifically three violations including using misogynistic language towards the female umpire. This caused him to default his third round doubles match with partner Simone Bolelli. On 11 October, the Grand Slam board provisionally suspended Fognini for two majors and fined him US$96,000 for a "Major Offence of Aggravated Behaviour." The fine will be halved and the ban of two majors will be lifted if good behavior is maintained through 2019.

At the St. Petersburg Open, Fognini reached the final by defeating top seed Roberto Bautista Agut in the semi-final. He lost in the final to Damir Džumhur in three sets.

=== 2018: Eight ATP tour title ===
Fabio Fognini serving in his semi-final match against Daniil Medvedev at the 2018 Sydney International

Fognini started his 2018 season at the Sydney International, where he reached the semi-finals and was defeated by the eventual champion, Daniil Medvedev in three sets despite being up a set and a break. At the 2018 Australian Open, he reached the fourth round, losing to Tomáš Berdych in straight sets.

During the South American Clay Court swing, Fognini played Argentina Open, losing the first round to Leonardo Mayer. He then won three 3-setters in Rio Open before crashing out to Fernando Verdasco in the semi-finals. At the Brasil Open in São Paulo, Fognini beat Domingues, Garcia-Lopez, and Cuevas to reach the final. He then came from one set down to beat Nicolas Jarry and win his first title in 2018. Due to his strong performance in South America, Fognini rose to No. 19 in the ATP ranking, his best in more than three years.

In Rome, after defeating 6th seed Dominic Thiem, Fognini won the first set against 7-time champion Rafael Nadal before losing in three sets. He was defeated in the fourth round of the French Open by 3rd seed Marin Čilić in 5 sets.

Fognini won his second title of the year at the Swedish Open in Båstad. The following week, as the top seed at the Swiss Open, Fognini exited the tournament early. He then traveled to Mexico to compete in the Los Cabos Open. Despite having little preparation on hard courts leading into the tournament, Fognini managed to win the title after defeating world number 4 Juan Martín del Potro in the final. Fognini's unique hairstyle he wore throughout the tournament garnered attention with some labeling it a "lucky charm".

During the autumn, the Italian reached the final of the Chengdu Open where he held four championship points against world number 123 Bernard Tomic. Fognini was however unable to convert and lost the final in a third set tiebreaker. In his next tournament he reached the semi-finals of Beijing, but was forced to withdraw due to an ankle injury. He subsequently withdrew from the Shanghai Masters due to the same injury.

After the most decorated season of his career in terms of titles won, Fognini ended the year at his then career high ranking of No.13.

=== 2019: Monte-Carlo champion, world No. 9 ===
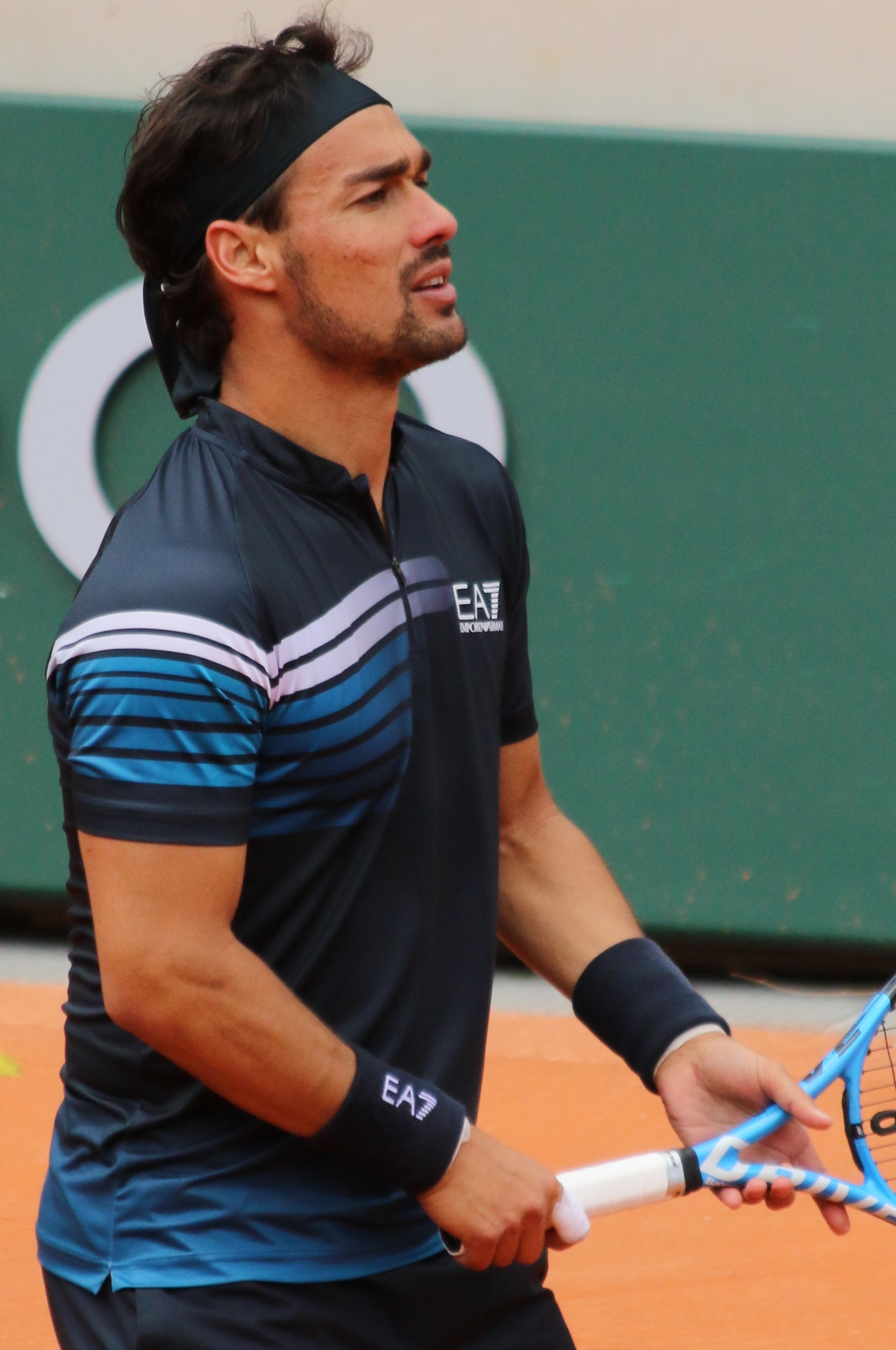
Fognini at the 2019 French Open

Fognini entered the Monte Carlo Masters on a five-match losing streak. His poor form led him to contemplate surgery for recurring ankle and elbow injuries. The Italian was quoted saying during an interview with Gazzetta dello Sport "I am not confident and I am sad about the lack of results". In the first round, Fognini saved five break points down a set and one break against Andrey Rublev before recovering to win the match. In his next three matches Fognini defeated world number 3 Alexander Zverev, world number 13 Borna Ćorić (once again, after being down a set and a break), and world No. 2 and three-time defending champion Rafael Nadal to reach his maiden Masters 1000 final. By defeating Nadal, Fognini became only the fourth player to defeat the Spaniard three times on a clay court, following his victories in Rio de Janeiro and Barcelona in 2015. He defeated Dušan Lajović in the final in straight sets, winning the biggest title of his career and becoming the first Italian to win a Masters 1000 title.

Fognini extended his winning streak to seven matches at the Madrid Masters before losing to Dominic Thiem in the third round. At the French Open, Fognini reached the fourth round where he lost to Zverev in four sets. Following the tournament, Fognini entered into the world's top 10 for singles for the first time in his career. He became the oldest player to break into the top-10 since the establishment of ATP rankings in 1973.

Following his third-round defeat at Wimbledon, to Tennys Sandgren, Fognini was fined $3,000 (£2,396) after he said, during an on-court outburst, that Wimbledon should be bombed.

=== 2020–2021: Two Australian Open fourth rounds ===
Fognini reached the fourth round at the Australian Open, beating Reilly Opelka after coming back from 2 sets to love down, Jordan Thompson, again in 5 sets, and Guido Pella. He lost in the fourth round to Tennys Sandgren.

In November 2020, Fognini teamed up with new coach Alberto Mancini.

Fognini reached the fourth round of the 2021 Australian Open for the fourth time, this time beating Pierre-Hugues Herbert in straight sets, Salvatore Caruso in a narrow fifth set tiebreak, and home favourite and 21st seed Alex de Minaur. He lost to Rafael Nadal in straight sets. The Caruso match was notable for an argument the pair had in which Fognini accused Caruso of being lucky.

Fognini failed to defend his title in Monte Carlo, but still reached the quarterfinals, beating Miomir Kecmanović, Jordan Thompson and Filip Krajinović before losing to Casper Ruud in straight sets.

At the 2021 Barcelona Open, Fognini was defaulted during his second round match against Bernabé Zapata Miralles for verbal abuse towards a line judge after being called for a foot fault.

At the 2021 French Open, Fognini reached the third round for the ninth time, where he was beaten in straight sets by Federico Delbonis. At the 2021 Wimbledon Championships he also reached the third round where he lost to 5th seed Andrey Rublev.

=== 2022: Record 400th singles career win, ATP 500 doubles title ===
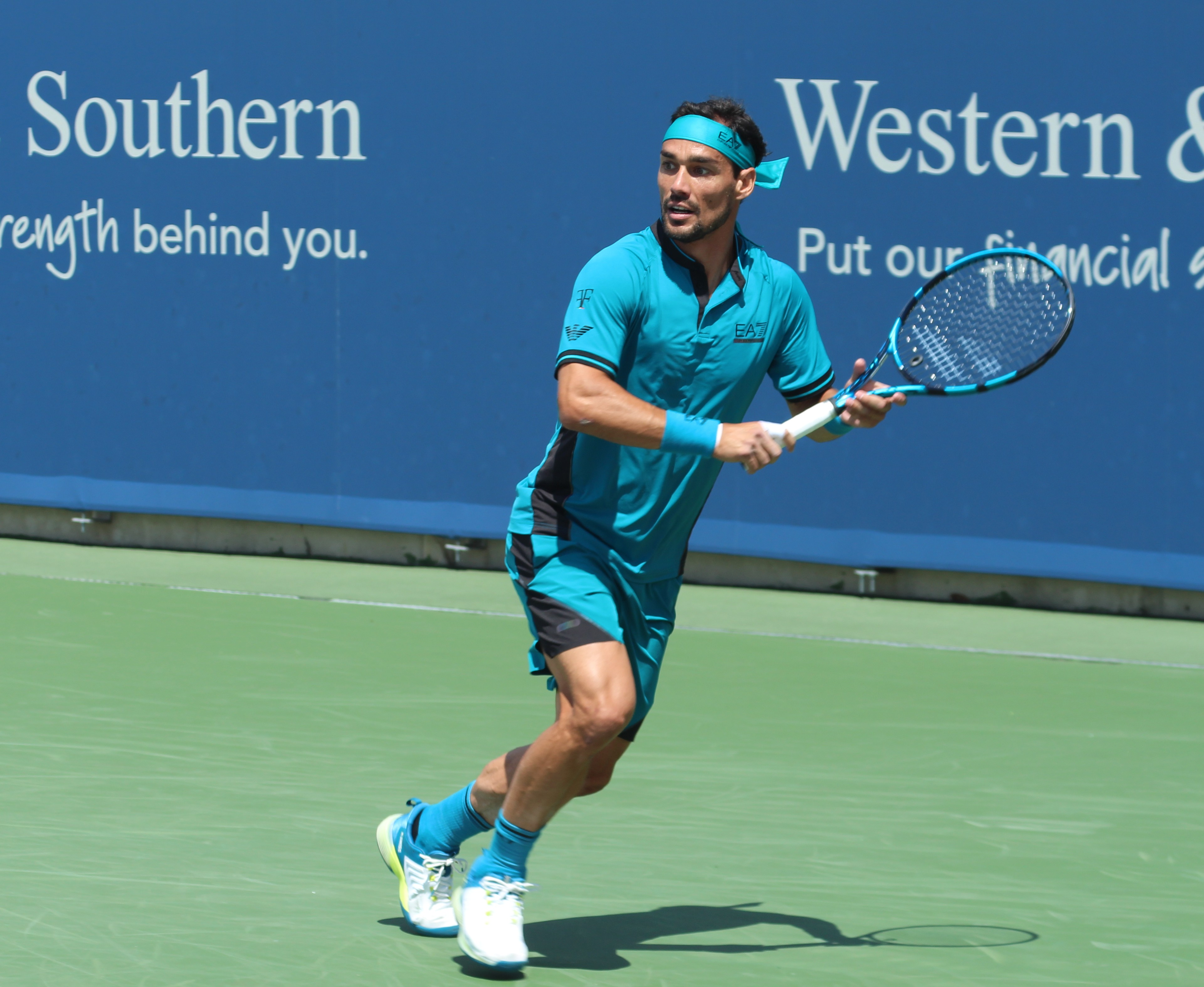
Fabio Fognini at the 2022 Western and Southern Tournament

In Indian Wells he recorded his 392 win making him the player with most wins of any Italian male player.

At the 2022 French Open he defeated Alexei Popyrin which put him one win away from his 400th career win. At the 2022 Hamburg European Open he reached the second round defeating Aljaž Bedene to earn his 400th career win. He became only the 14th active player to win 400 matches and the first Italian man in the Open Era with 400 tour-level wins followed by Adriano Panatta with 391 wins, and by Andreas Seppi with 386 wins, who was the second-most among active Italians.

=== 2023–2025: Loss of form, back to Top 100, retirement ===
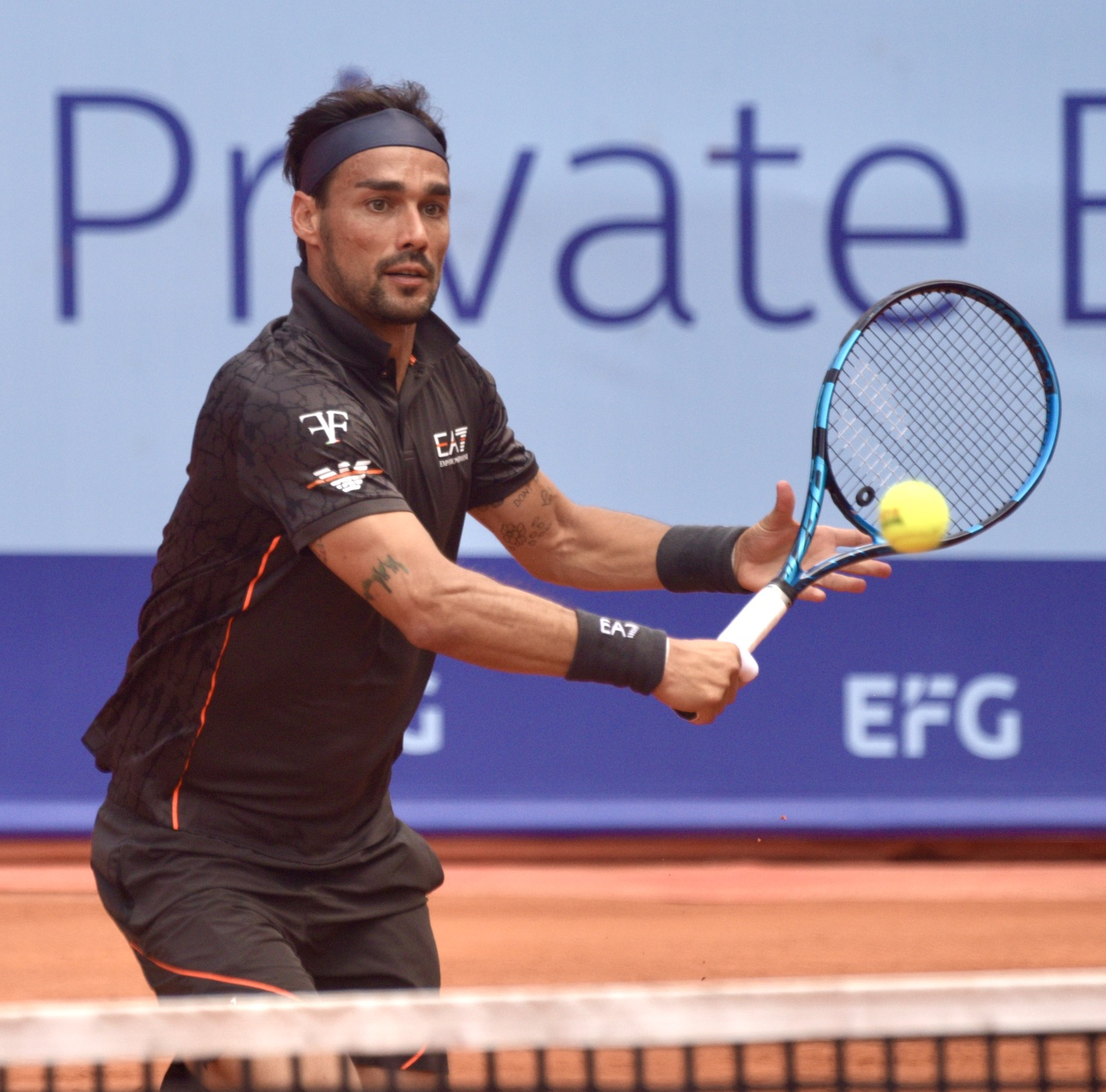
Fognini at the 2023 Swiss Open Gstaad

He fell out of the top 100 after withdrawing from the 2023 Monte-Carlo Masters where he was awarded a wildcard. He received a wildcard for his home Masters in Rome, where he defeated Andy Murray and upset 30th seed Miomir Kecmanović to record his first two wins on clay at a Masters level for the season.

At the 2023 US Open, in the qualifying competition, he lost in the first round to Jakub Mensik. He also received a wildcard for the Shanghai Masters. In November 2023, he reached his first ATP semifinal of the season, and first since April 2022 in Metz also as a wildcard defeating previous year’s runner-up Alexander Bublik after saving two match points in a match with two tiebreaks, and defending champion and compatriot Lorenzo Sonego. He won the Valencia Challenger over Roberto Bautista Agut, a final in which two former top 10 players met for the first time since Guillermo Canas beat Nicolas Lapentti in Montevideo in 2006.

He received a wildcard for the 2024 BNP Paribas Open and defeated Bernabe Zapata Miralles in the first round. In the beginning of the clay court season he qualified at the 2024 Grand Prix Hassan II and defeated Hugo Gaston and top seed Laslo Djere to reach the quarterfinals.

Fognini competed in the 2024 Wimbledon Championships, where he beat No. 8 seed Casper Ruud, on his way to the third round, where he lost to Roberto Bautista Agut in five sets. Fognini finished the season inside the top 100, at world No. 91 in the singles ATP rankings on 9 December 2024.

On 7 May 2025, Fognini announced that his 18th appearance at the 2025 Italian Open, as a wildcard, will be his final in his career.

On 30 June 2025, after being defeated by defending champion Carlos Alcaraz in a five-set match in the first round of the 2025 Wimbledon Championships, Fognini hinted at the possibility that it may be his last professional tournament. On 9 July 2025, Fognini officially announced his retirement from tennis.

== National representation ==
Fognini guided Italy into the quarterfinals of the 2013 Davis Cup World Group, defeating Ivan Dodig in the fifth and decisive rubber against Croatia. It was the first time Italy had reached that stage since 1998. He also guided Italy past Argentina to the quarterfinals the following year, winning both singles rubbers against Juan Mónaco and Carlos Berlocq, and the doubles rubber (partnering Simone Bolelli). In the quarterfinals in Naples against Great Britain, Fognini equalled the tie at 2–2 after defeating reigning Wimbledon champion Andy Murray in a straight sets win (after defeating James Ward two days previously), proving vital to Italy making the semifinals with an eventual 3–2 victory. This was only the second time Murray had lost a singles rubber in the Davis Cup (after his first appearance ever in 2005). In the semifinal against Switzerland he lost both his singles rubbers to Roger Federer and Stanislas Wawrinka.

== Equipment and fashion ==
Fognini currently uses the Babolat Pure Drive Racquet strung with Babolat RPM Blast strings. His grip is Babolat Vs Original.

In November 2016, he moved from Adidas apparel to Hydrogen, an Italian leading luxury sportswear firm. In January 2017, Fognini signed a 3-years shoe supply agreement with ASICS. In 2018, Fognini and his wife Flavia Pennetta signed to become ambassadors of the Emporio Armani collection. From January 2019 onwards he wore the designs of Emporio Armani EA7 sportswear on-court.

== Style of play ==
A clay-court specialist, Fognini is known for his streaky temperament and remarkable penchant for swearing, as well as his flair, speed, and movement on court. He has been known to lose his cool on occasion. He famously lost his cool and blew a 3–0 lead in the final set against Andy Murray at the 2016 Olympics. He was thrown out of the 2017 U.S. Open over obscene remarks made to a female umpire. Fognini has also drawn criticism for shouting at his opponents at key times when they are about to make a crucial shot and his behaviour in general which is often petulant. He holds the record for committing the most foot faults whilst still winning a match: a grand total of 12, including double-faulting due to consecutive foot faults. Fognini's serve is relatively underpowered and hardly a trademark weapon, but he puts emphasis on precision and placement, while also having the ability to hit above 130 mph on occasion. Known for his baseline play and big groundstrokes despite his average stature, one of his signature shots is his off-forehand, which he uses to great effect. His tactics usually consist of a serve out wide, drawing a weak return, setting Fognini up to hit a clean winner off the forehand side. He also uses the backhand down the line frequently, often in key moments.

== Personal life ==
Since 2014, Fognini has been in a relationship with Italian tennis compatriot Flavia Pennetta, from Brindisi, a retired player who won the 2015 US Open singles title. The couple were engaged in 2015 and married in Ostuni on 16 June 2016. Their son was born in 2017. Their second child, a daughter, was born in 2019. In 2021 Pennetta gave birth to their second daughter, in Barcelona, Spain.

== Career statistics ==
=== Grand Slam performance timelines ===
Key
W	F	SF	QF	#R	RR	Q#	DNQ	A	NH

(W) winner; (F) finalist; (SF) semifinalist; (QF) quarterfinalist; (#R) rounds 4, 3, 2, 1; (RR) round-robin stage; (Q#) qualification round; (DNQ) did not qualify; (A) absent; (NH) not held; (SR) strike rate (events won / competed); (W–L) win–loss record.
To avoid confusion and double counting, these charts are updated at the conclusion of a tournament or when the player's participation has ended.

=== Singles ===
Tournament	2006	2007	2008	2009	2010	2011	2012	2013	2014	2015	2016	2017	2018	2019	2020	2021	2022	2023	2024	2025	SR	W–L	Win %
Australian Open	A	Q1	1R	2R	1R	1R	1R	1R	4R	1R	1R	2R	4R	3R	4R	4R	1R	1R	A	A	0 / 16	16–16	50%
French Open	A	1R	A	1R	3R	QF (Note: Fognini withdrew prior to his quarterfinal match at the 2011 French Open due to a muscle tear; this is not counted as a loss.)	3R	3R	3R	2R	1R	3R	4R	4R	1R	3R	2R	3R	2R	Q1	0 / 17	27–16	63%
Wimbledon	A	A	1R	2R	3R	A	2R	1R	3R	2R	2R	3R	3R	3R	NH	3R	1R	A	3R	1R	0 / 15	18–15	55%
US Open	Q1	Q3	1R	1R	1R	2R	3R	1R	2R	4R	2R	1R	2R	1R	A	1R	2R	Q1	1R	A	0 / 15	10–15	40%
Win–loss	0–0	0–1	0–3	2–4	4–4	5–2	5–4	2–4	8–4	5–4	2–4	5–4	9–4	7–4	3–2	7–4	2–4	2–2	3–3	0–1	0 / 63	71–62	53%

=== Doubles ===
Tournament	2008	2009	2010	2011	2012	2013	2014	2015	2016	2017	2018	...	2022	2023	SR	W–L	Win %
Australian Open	2R	2R	2R	1R	2R	SF	2R	W	2R	1R	2R		QF	1R	1 / 13	20–12	63%
French Open	A	2R	1R	2R	1R	1R	2R	SF	1R	1R	1R		A	2R	0 / 11	8–11	42%
Wimbledon	A	1R	1R	A	1R	1R	2R	1R	1R	1R	A		A	A	0 / 8	1–8	11%
US Open	1R	1R	A	SF	1R	2R	1R	1R	2R	3R	2R		3R	A	0 / 11	11–10	52%
Win–loss	1–2	2–4	1–3	5–3	1–4	5–4	3–4	10–3	2–4	2–3	2–3		5–2	1–2	1 / 43	40–41	49%

=== Grand Slam tournament finals ===
==== Doubles ====
Result	Year	Championship	Surface	Partner	Opponents	Score
Win	2015	Australian Open	Hard	(Italy) Simone Bolelli	(France) Pierre-Hugues Herbert (France) Nicolas Mahut	6–4, 6–4

=== ATP 1000 finals ===
==== Singles ====
Result	Year	Tournament	Surface	Opponent	Score
Win	2019	Monte-Carlo Masters	Clay	(Serbia) Dušan Lajović	6–3, 6–4

==== Doubles ====
Result	Year	Tournament	Surface	Partner	Opponents	Score
Loss	2015	Indian Wells Open	Hard	(Italy) Simone Bolelli	(United States) Jack Sock (Canada) Vasek Pospisil	4–6, 7–6^{(3–7)}, [7–10]
Loss	2015	Monte-Carlo Masters	Clay	(Italy) Simone Bolelli	(United States) Bob Bryan (United States) Mike Bryan	6–7^{(3–7)}, 1–6
Loss	2015	Shanghai Masters	Hard	(Italy) Simone Bolelli	(South Africa) Raven Klaasen (Brazil) Marcelo Melo	3–6, 3–6

== See also ==
- Fabio Fognini career statistics
- Italian players best ranking
- Tennis in Italy
