= 2014 ATP World Tour =

Men's tennis circuit

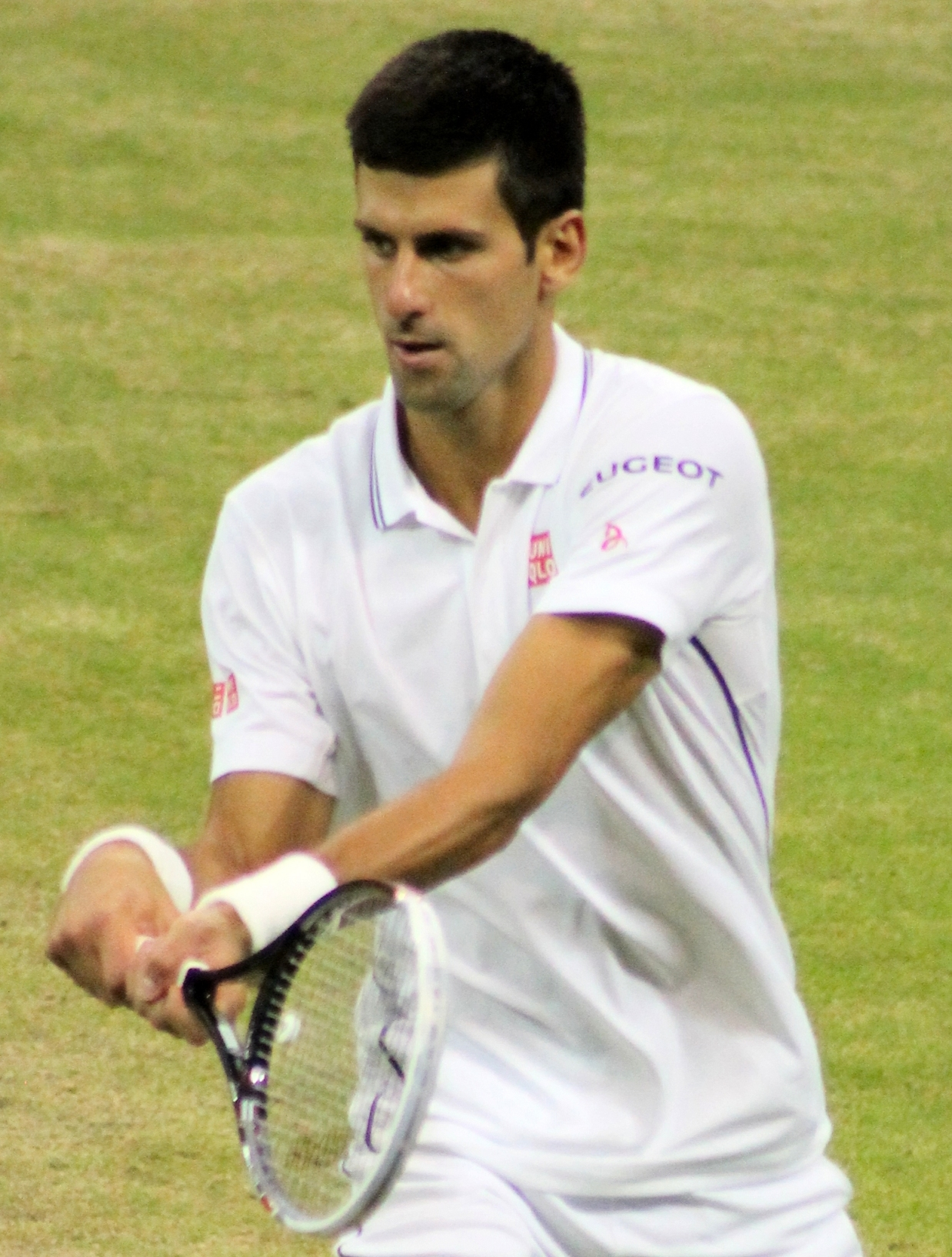
- Novak Djokovic finished the year as world No. 1 for the third time in his career. He won seven tournaments during the season, including a major at the Wimbledon Championships, and the ATP World Tour Finals. He also won four Masters 1000 events and finished runner-up at another major, the French Open.

Details
- Duration: 28 December 2013 – 23 November 2014
- Edition: 45th
- Tournaments: 64
- Categories: Grand Slam (4); ATP World Tour Finals; ATP World Tour Masters 1000 (9); ATP World Tour 500 (11); ATP World Tour 250 (39)

Achievements (singles)
- Most titles: (Serbia) Novak Djokovic (7)
- Most finals: (Switzerland) Roger Federer (11)
- Prize money leader: (Serbia) Novak Djokovic ($14,250,527)
- Points leader: (Serbia) Novak Djokovic (11,360)

Awards
- Player of the year: (Serbia) Novak Djokovic
- Doubles team of the year: (United States) Bob Bryan (United States) Mike Bryan
- Most improved player of the year: (Spain) Roberto Bautista Agut
- Star of tomorrow: (Croatia) Borna Ćorić
- Comeback player of the year: (Belgium) David Goffin

The 2014 ATP World Tour was the global elite men's professional tennis circuit organized by the Association of Tennis Professionals (ATP) for the 2014 tennis season. The 2014 ATP World Tour calendar comprises the Grand Slam tournaments (supervised by the International Tennis Federation (ITF)), the ATP World Tour Masters 1000, the ATP World Tour 500 series, the ATP World Tour 250 series, the Davis Cup (organized by the ITF) and the ATP World Tour Finals. Also included in the 2014 calendar is the Hopman Cup, which is organized by the ITF and does not distribute ranking points.

== Schedule ==
This is the complete schedule of events on the 2014 calendar, with player progression documented from the quarterfinals stage.

Key

Grand Slam
ATP World Tour Finals
ATP World Tour Masters 1000
ATP World Tour 500
ATP World Tour 250
Team Events

=== January ===
Week	Tournament	Champions	Runners-up	Semifinalists	Quarterfinalists
30 Dec	Hopman Cup; Perth, Australia; ITF Mixed Teams Championships; Hard (i) – $1,000,000 – 8 teams (RR)	France; 2–1	Poland	Round robin (Group A) Canada; Italy; Australia	Round robin (Group B) Czech Republic; United States; Spain
30 Dec	Brisbane International; Brisbane, Australia; ATP World Tour 250; Hard – $511,825 – 28S/16D; Singles – Doubles	(Australia) Lleyton Hewitt; 6–1, 4–6, 6–3	(Switzerland) Roger Federer	(France) Jérémy Chardy (Japan) Kei Nishikori	(Australia) Marinko Matosevic (Australia) Samuel Groth (Romania) Marius Copil (Croatia) Marin Čilić
30 Dec	Brisbane International; Brisbane, Australia; ATP World Tour 250; Hard – $511,825 – 28S/16D; Singles – Doubles	(Poland) Mariusz Fyrstenberg (Canada) Daniel Nestor; 6–7^{(4–7)},6–4, [10–7]	(Colombia) Juan Sebastián Cabal (Colombia) Robert Farah	(France) Jérémy Chardy (Japan) Kei Nishikori	(Australia) Marinko Matosevic (Australia) Samuel Groth (Romania) Marius Copil (Croatia) Marin Čilić
30 Dec	Aircel Chennai Open; Chennai, India; ATP World Tour 250; Hard – $459,140 – 28S/16D; Singles – Doubles	(Switzerland) Stan Wawrinka; 7–5, 6–2	(France) Édouard Roger-Vasselin	(Canada) Vasek Pospisil (Spain) Marcel Granollers	(Slovenia) Aljaž Bedene (India) Yuki Bhambri (France) Benoît Paire (Israel) Dudi Sela
30 Dec	Aircel Chennai Open; Chennai, India; ATP World Tour 250; Hard – $459,140 – 28S/16D; Singles – Doubles	(Sweden) Johan Brunström (Denmark) Frederik Nielsen; 6–2, 4–6, [10–7]	(Croatia) Marin Draganja (Croatia) Mate Pavić	(Canada) Vasek Pospisil (Spain) Marcel Granollers	(Slovenia) Aljaž Bedene (India) Yuki Bhambri (France) Benoît Paire (Israel) Dudi Sela
30 Dec	Qatar ExxonMobil Open; Doha, Qatar; ATP World Tour 250; Hard – $1,195,500 – 32S/16D; Singles – Doubles	(Spain) Rafael Nadal; 6–1, 6–7^{(5–7)}, 6–2	(France) Gaël Monfils	(Germany) Peter Gojowczyk (Germany) Florian Mayer	(Latvia) Ernests Gulbis (Germany) Dustin Brown (Romania) Victor Hănescu (Germany) Daniel Brands
30 Dec	Qatar ExxonMobil Open; Doha, Qatar; ATP World Tour 250; Hard – $1,195,500 – 32S/16D; Singles – Doubles	(Czech Republic) Tomáš Berdych (Czech Republic) Jan Hájek; 6–2, 6–4	(Austria) Alexander Peya (Brazil) Bruno Soares	(Germany) Peter Gojowczyk (Germany) Florian Mayer	(Latvia) Ernests Gulbis (Germany) Dustin Brown (Romania) Victor Hănescu (Germany) Daniel Brands
6 Jan	Apia International Sydney; Sydney, Australia; ATP World Tour 250; Hard – $511,825 – 28S/16D; Singles – Doubles	(Argentina) Juan Martín del Potro; 6–3, 6–1	(Australia) Bernard Tomic	(Russia) Dmitry Tursunov (Ukraine) Sergiy Stakhovsky	(Czech Republic) Radek Štěpánek (Uzbekistan) Denis Istomin (Australia) Marinko Matosevic (Ukraine) Alexandr Dolgopolov
6 Jan	Apia International Sydney; Sydney, Australia; ATP World Tour 250; Hard – $511,825 – 28S/16D; Singles – Doubles	(Canada) Daniel Nestor (Serbia) Nenad Zimonjić; 7–6^{(7–3)}, 7–6^{(7–3)}	(India) Rohan Bopanna (Pakistan) Aisam-ul-Haq Qureshi	(Russia) Dmitry Tursunov (Ukraine) Sergiy Stakhovsky	(Czech Republic) Radek Štěpánek (Uzbekistan) Denis Istomin (Australia) Marinko Matosevic (Ukraine) Alexandr Dolgopolov
6 Jan	Heineken Open; Auckland, New Zealand; ATP World Tour 250; Hard – $514,345 – 28S/16D; Singles – Doubles	(United States) John Isner; 7–6^{(7–4)}, 7–6^{(9–7)}	(Chinese Taipei) Lu Yen-hsun	(Spain) David Ferrer (Spain) Roberto Bautista Agut	(Spain) Guillermo García López (United States) Steve Johnson (Germany) Philipp Kohlschreiber (United States) Jack Sock
6 Jan	Heineken Open; Auckland, New Zealand; ATP World Tour 250; Hard – $514,345 – 28S/16D; Singles – Doubles	(Austria) Julian Knowle (Brazil) Marcelo Melo; 4–6, 6–3, [10–5]	(Austria) Alexander Peya (Brazil) Bruno Soares	(Spain) David Ferrer (Spain) Roberto Bautista Agut	(Spain) Guillermo García López (United States) Steve Johnson (Germany) Philipp Kohlschreiber (United States) Jack Sock
13 Jan; 20 Jan	Australian Open; Melbourne, Australia; Grand Slam; Hard – A$16,000,000; 128S/64D/32X; Singles – Doubles – Mixed doubles	(Switzerland) Stan Wawrinka; 6–3, 6–2, 3–6, 6–3	(Spain) Rafael Nadal	(Switzerland) Roger Federer (Czech Republic) Tomáš Berdych	(Bulgaria) Grigor Dimitrov (United Kingdom) Andy Murray (Spain) David Ferrer (Serbia) Novak Djokovic
13 Jan; 20 Jan	Australian Open; Melbourne, Australia; Grand Slam; Hard – A$16,000,000; 128S/64D/32X; Singles – Doubles – Mixed doubles	(Poland) Łukasz Kubot (Sweden) Robert Lindstedt; 6–3, 6–3	(United States) Eric Butorac (South Africa) Raven Klaasen	(Switzerland) Roger Federer (Czech Republic) Tomáš Berdych	(Bulgaria) Grigor Dimitrov (United Kingdom) Andy Murray (Spain) David Ferrer (Serbia) Novak Djokovic
13 Jan; 20 Jan	Australian Open; Melbourne, Australia; Grand Slam; Hard – A$16,000,000; 128S/64D/32X; Singles – Doubles – Mixed doubles	(France) Kristina Mladenovic (Canada) Daniel Nestor; 6–3, 6–2	(India) Sania Mirza (Romania) Horia Tecău	(Switzerland) Roger Federer (Czech Republic) Tomáš Berdych	(Bulgaria) Grigor Dimitrov (United Kingdom) Andy Murray (Spain) David Ferrer (Serbia) Novak Djokovic
27 Jan	Davis Cup first round Ostrava, Czech Republic – hard (i); Tokyo, Japan – hard (i); Frankfurt, Germany – hard (i); La Roche sur Yon, France – clay (red) (i); San Diego, United States – clay (red); Mar de Plata, Argentina – clay (red); Astana, Kazakhstan – hard (i); Novi Sad, Serbia – hard (i)	First-round winners Czech Republic 3–2; Japan 4–1; Germany 4–1; France 5–0; Great Britain 3–1; Italy 3–1; Kazakhstan 3–2; Switzerland 3–2	First-round losers Netherlands; Canada; Spain; Australia; United States; Argentina; Belgium; Serbia		

=== February ===
Week	Tournament	Champions	Runners-up	Semifinalists	Quarterfinalists
3 Feb	Open Sud de France; Montpellier, France; ATP World Tour 250; Hard (i) – €485,760 – 28S/16D; Singles – Doubles	(France) Gaël Monfils; 6–4, 6–4	(France) Richard Gasquet	(Poland) Jerzy Janowicz (Finland) Jarkko Nieminen	(France) Albano Olivetti (France) Édouard Roger-Vasselin (Uzbekistan) Denis Istomin (France) Marc Gicquel
3 Feb	Open Sud de France; Montpellier, France; ATP World Tour 250; Hard (i) – €485,760 – 28S/16D; Singles – Doubles	(Russia) Nikolay Davydenko (Uzbekistan) Denis Istomin; 6–4, 1–6, [10–7]	(France) Marc Gicquel (France) Nicolas Mahut	(Poland) Jerzy Janowicz (Finland) Jarkko Nieminen	(France) Albano Olivetti (France) Édouard Roger-Vasselin (Uzbekistan) Denis Istomin (France) Marc Gicquel
3 Feb	PBZ Zagreb Indoors; Zagreb, Croatia; ATP World Tour 250; Hard (i) – €485,760 – 28S/16D; Singles – Doubles	(Croatia) Marin Čilić; 6–3, 6–4	(Germany) Tommy Haas	(United Kingdom) Daniel Evans (Germany) Björn Phau	(Russia) Andrey Kuznetsov (Germany) Philipp Kohlschreiber (Croatia) Ivan Dodig (Israel) Dudi Sela
3 Feb	PBZ Zagreb Indoors; Zagreb, Croatia; ATP World Tour 250; Hard (i) – €485,760 – 28S/16D; Singles – Doubles	(Netherlands) Jean-Julien Rojer (Romania) Horia Tecău; 3–6, 6–4, [10–2]	(Germany) Philipp Marx (Slovakia) Michal Mertiňák	(United Kingdom) Daniel Evans (Germany) Björn Phau	(Russia) Andrey Kuznetsov (Germany) Philipp Kohlschreiber (Croatia) Ivan Dodig (Israel) Dudi Sela
3 Feb	Royal Guard Open; Viña del Mar, Chile; ATP World Tour 250; Clay (red) – $485,760 – 28S/16D; Singles – Doubles	(Italy) Fabio Fognini; 6–2, 6–4	(Argentina) Leonardo Mayer	(Spain) Nicolás Almagro (Colombia) Santiago Giraldo	(France) Jérémy Chardy (Japan) Taro Daniel (Spain) Guillermo García López (Spain) Daniel Gimeno Traver
3 Feb	Royal Guard Open; Viña del Mar, Chile; ATP World Tour 250; Clay (red) – $485,760 – 28S/16D; Singles – Doubles	(Austria) Oliver Marach (Romania) Florin Mergea; 6–3, 6–4	(Colombia) Juan Sebastián Cabal (Colombia) Robert Farah	(Spain) Nicolás Almagro (Colombia) Santiago Giraldo	(France) Jérémy Chardy (Japan) Taro Daniel (Spain) Guillermo García López (Spain) Daniel Gimeno Traver
10 Feb	ABN AMRO World Tennis Tournament; Rotterdam, Netherlands; ATP World Tour 500; Hard (i) – €1,575,875 – 32S/16D; Singles – Doubles	(Czech Republic) Tomáš Berdych; 6–4, 6–2	(Croatia) Marin Čilić	(Latvia) Ernests Gulbis (Netherlands) Igor Sijsling	(Argentina) Juan Martín del Potro (Poland) Jerzy Janowicz (Germany) Philipp Kohlschreiber (United Kingdom) Andy Murray
10 Feb	ABN AMRO World Tennis Tournament; Rotterdam, Netherlands; ATP World Tour 500; Hard (i) – €1,575,875 – 32S/16D; Singles – Doubles	(France) Michaël Llodra (France) Nicolas Mahut; 6–2, 7–6^{(7–4)}	(Netherlands) Jean-Julien Rojer (Romania) Horia Tecău	(Latvia) Ernests Gulbis (Netherlands) Igor Sijsling	(Argentina) Juan Martín del Potro (Poland) Jerzy Janowicz (Germany) Philipp Kohlschreiber (United Kingdom) Andy Murray
10 Feb	U.S. National Indoor Tennis Championships; Memphis, United States; ATP World Tour 250; Hard (i) – $647,675 – 28S/16D; Singles – Doubles	(Japan) Kei Nishikori; 6–4, 7–6^{(7–0)}	(Croatia) Ivo Karlović	(United States) Michael Russell (Chinese Taipei) Lu Yen-hsun	(Russia) Alex Bogomolov Jr. (Australia) Lleyton Hewitt (United States) Alex Kuznetsov (United States) Jack Sock
10 Feb	U.S. National Indoor Tennis Championships; Memphis, United States; ATP World Tour 250; Hard (i) – $647,675 – 28S/16D; Singles – Doubles	(United States) Eric Butorac (South Africa) Raven Klaasen; 6–4, 6–4	(United States) Bob Bryan (United States) Mike Bryan	(United States) Michael Russell (Chinese Taipei) Lu Yen-hsun	(Russia) Alex Bogomolov Jr. (Australia) Lleyton Hewitt (United States) Alex Kuznetsov (United States) Jack Sock
10 Feb	Copa Claro; Buenos Aires, Argentina; ATP World Tour 250; Clay (red) – $567,760 – 32S/16D; Singles – Doubles	(Spain) David Ferrer; 6–4, 6–3	(Italy) Fabio Fognini	(Spain) Nicolás Almagro (Spain) Tommy Robredo	(Spain) Albert Ramos (France) Jérémy Chardy (Netherlands) Robin Haase (Spain) Pablo Andújar
10 Feb	Copa Claro; Buenos Aires, Argentina; ATP World Tour 250; Clay (red) – $567,760 – 32S/16D; Singles – Doubles	(Spain) Marcel Granollers (Spain) Marc López; 7–5, 6–4	(Uruguay) Pablo Cuevas (Argentina) Horacio Zeballos	(Spain) Nicolás Almagro (Spain) Tommy Robredo	(Spain) Albert Ramos (France) Jérémy Chardy (Netherlands) Robin Haase (Spain) Pablo Andújar
17 Feb	Rio Open; Rio de Janeiro, Brazil; ATP World Tour 500; Clay (red) – $1,454,365 – 32S/16D; Singles – Doubles	(Spain) Rafael Nadal; 6–3, 7–6^{(7–3)}	(Ukraine) Alexandr Dolgopolov	(Spain) Pablo Andújar (Spain) David Ferrer	(Portugal) João Sousa (Spain) Tommy Robredo (Italy) Fabio Fognini (Brazil) Thomaz Bellucci
17 Feb	Rio Open; Rio de Janeiro, Brazil; ATP World Tour 500; Clay (red) – $1,454,365 – 32S/16D; Singles – Doubles	(Colombia) Juan Sebastián Cabal (Colombia) Robert Farah; 6–4, 6–2	(Spain) David Marrero (Brazil) Marcelo Melo	(Spain) Pablo Andújar (Spain) David Ferrer	(Portugal) João Sousa (Spain) Tommy Robredo (Italy) Fabio Fognini (Brazil) Thomaz Bellucci
17 Feb	Open 13; Marseille, France; ATP World Tour 250; Hard (i) – €621,560 – 28S/16D; Singles – Doubles	(Latvia) Ernests Gulbis; 7–6^{(7–5)}, 6–4	(France) Jo-Wilfried Tsonga	(France) Richard Gasquet (Germany) Jan-Lennard Struff	(Croatia) Ivan Dodig (France) Nicolas Mahut (France) Michaël Llodra (France) Édouard Roger-Vasselin
17 Feb	Open 13; Marseille, France; ATP World Tour 250; Hard (i) – €621,560 – 28S/16D; Singles – Doubles	(France) Julien Benneteau (France) Édouard Roger-Vasselin; 4–6, 7–6^{(8–6)}, [13–11]	(Australia) Paul Hanley (United Kingdom) Jonathan Marray	(France) Richard Gasquet (Germany) Jan-Lennard Struff	(Croatia) Ivan Dodig (France) Nicolas Mahut (France) Michaël Llodra (France) Édouard Roger-Vasselin
17 Feb	Delray Beach International Tennis Championships; Delray Beach, United States; ATP World Tour 250; Hard – $539,730 – 32S/16D; Singles – Doubles	(Croatia) Marin Čilić; 7–6^{(8–6)}, 6–7^{(7–9)}, 6–4	(South Africa) Kevin Anderson	(United States) Steve Johnson (United States) John Isner	(Spain) Feliciano López (Australia) Marinko Matosevic (Russia) Teymuraz Gabashvili (United States) Rhyne Williams
17 Feb	Delray Beach International Tennis Championships; Delray Beach, United States; ATP World Tour 250; Hard – $539,730 – 32S/16D; Singles – Doubles	(United States) Bob Bryan (United States) Mike Bryan; 6–2, 6–3	(Czech Republic) František Čermák (Russia) Mikhail Elgin	(United States) Steve Johnson (United States) John Isner	(Spain) Feliciano López (Australia) Marinko Matosevic (Russia) Teymuraz Gabashvili (United States) Rhyne Williams
24 Feb	Dubai Tennis Championships; Dubai, United Arab Emirates; ATP World Tour 500; Hard – $2,359,935 – 32S/16D; Singles – Doubles	(Switzerland) Roger Federer; 3–6, 6–4, 6–3	(Czech Republic) Tomáš Berdych	(Serbia) Novak Djokovic (Germany) Philipp Kohlschreiber	(Russia) Mikhail Youzhny (Czech Republic) Lukáš Rosol (France) Jo-Wilfried Tsonga (Tunisia) Malek Jaziri
24 Feb	Dubai Tennis Championships; Dubai, United Arab Emirates; ATP World Tour 500; Hard – $2,359,935 – 32S/16D; Singles – Doubles	(India) Rohan Bopanna (Pakistan) Aisam-ul-Haq Qureshi; 6–4, 6–3	(Canada) Daniel Nestor (Serbia) Nenad Zimonjić	(Serbia) Novak Djokovic (Germany) Philipp Kohlschreiber	(Russia) Mikhail Youzhny (Czech Republic) Lukáš Rosol (France) Jo-Wilfried Tsonga (Tunisia) Malek Jaziri
24 Feb	Abierto Mexicano Telcel; Acapulco, Mexico; ATP World Tour 500; Hard – $1,454,365 – 32S/16D; Singles – Doubles	(Bulgaria) Grigor Dimitrov; 7–6^{(7–1)}, 3–6, 7–6^{(7–5)}	(South Africa) Kevin Anderson	(Ukraine) Alexandr Dolgopolov (United Kingdom) Andy Murray	(Spain) David Ferrer (Croatia) Ivo Karlović (Latvia) Ernests Gulbis (France) Gilles Simon
24 Feb	Abierto Mexicano Telcel; Acapulco, Mexico; ATP World Tour 500; Hard – $1,454,365 – 32S/16D; Singles – Doubles	(South Africa) Kevin Anderson (Australia) Matthew Ebden; 6–3, 6–3	(Spain) Feliciano López (Belarus) Max Mirnyi	(Ukraine) Alexandr Dolgopolov (United Kingdom) Andy Murray	(Spain) David Ferrer (Croatia) Ivo Karlović (Latvia) Ernests Gulbis (France) Gilles Simon
24 Feb	Brasil Open; São Paulo, Brazil; ATP World Tour 250; Clay (red) (i) – $539,730 – 28S/16D; Singles – Doubles	(Argentina) Federico Delbonis; 4–6, 6–3, 6–4	(Italy) Paolo Lorenzi	(Germany) Tommy Haas (Brazil) Thomaz Bellucci	(Argentina) Horacio Zeballos (Argentina) Juan Mónaco (Slovakia) Martin Kližan (Spain) Albert Montañés
24 Feb	Brasil Open; São Paulo, Brazil; ATP World Tour 250; Clay (red) (i) – $539,730 – 28S/16D; Singles – Doubles	(Spain) Guillermo García López (Austria) Philipp Oswald; 5–7, 6–4, [15–13]	(Colombia) Juan Sebastián Cabal (Colombia) Robert Farah	(Germany) Tommy Haas (Brazil) Thomaz Bellucci	(Argentina) Horacio Zeballos (Argentina) Juan Mónaco (Slovakia) Martin Kližan (Spain) Albert Montañés

=== March ===
Week	Tournament	Champions	Runners-up	Semifinalists	Quarterfinalists
3 Mar; 10 Mar	BNP Paribas Open; Indian Wells, United States; ATP World Tour Masters 1000; Hard – $5,081,880 – 96S/32D; Singles – Doubles	(Serbia) Novak Djokovic; 3–6, 6–3, 7–6^{(7–3)}	(Switzerland) Roger Federer	(Ukraine) Alexandr Dolgopolov (United States) John Isner	(Canada) Milos Raonic (South Africa) Kevin Anderson (Latvia) Ernests Gulbis (France) Julien Benneteau
3 Mar; 10 Mar	BNP Paribas Open; Indian Wells, United States; ATP World Tour Masters 1000; Hard – $5,081,880 – 96S/32D; Singles – Doubles	(United States) Bob Bryan (United States) Mike Bryan; 6–4, 6–3	(Austria) Alexander Peya (Brazil) Bruno Soares	(Ukraine) Alexandr Dolgopolov (United States) John Isner	(Canada) Milos Raonic (South Africa) Kevin Anderson (Latvia) Ernests Gulbis (France) Julien Benneteau
17 Mar; 24 Mar	Sony Open Tennis; Key Biscayne, United States; ATP World Tour Masters 1000; Hard – $4,562,245 – 96S/32D; Singles – Doubles	(Serbia) Novak Djokovic; 6–3, 6–3	(Spain) Rafael Nadal	(Czech Republic) Tomáš Berdych (Japan) Kei Nishikori	(Canada) Milos Raonic (Ukraine) Alexandr Dolgopolov (Switzerland) Roger Federer (United Kingdom) Andy Murray
17 Mar; 24 Mar	Sony Open Tennis; Key Biscayne, United States; ATP World Tour Masters 1000; Hard – $4,562,245 – 96S/32D; Singles – Doubles	(United States) Bob Bryan (United States) Mike Bryan; 7–6^{(10–8)}, 6–4	(Colombia) Juan Sebastián Cabal (Colombia) Robert Farah	(Czech Republic) Tomáš Berdych (Japan) Kei Nishikori	(Canada) Milos Raonic (Ukraine) Alexandr Dolgopolov (Switzerland) Roger Federer (United Kingdom) Andy Murray
31 Mar	Davis Cup Quarterfinals; Tokyo, Japan – hard (i); Nancy, France – hard (i); Naples, Italy – clay (red); Geneva, Switzerland – hard (i)	Quarterfinals winners Czech Republic 5–0; France 3–2; Italy 3–2; Switzerland 3–2	Quarterfinals losers Japan; Germany; Great Britain; Kazakhstan		

=== April ===
Week	Tournament	Champions	Runners-up	Semifinalists	Quarterfinalists
7 Apr	U.S. Men's Clay Court Championships; Houston, United States; ATP World Tour 250; Clay (maroon) – $539,730 – 28S/16D; Singles – Doubles	(Spain) Fernando Verdasco; 6–3, 7–6^{(7–4)}	(Spain) Nicolás Almagro	(United States) Sam Querrey (Colombia) Santiago Giraldo	(Germany) Dustin Brown (United States) Jack Sock (United States) Donald Young (Colombia) Alejandro González
7 Apr	U.S. Men's Clay Court Championships; Houston, United States; ATP World Tour 250; Clay (maroon) – $539,730 – 28S/16D; Singles – Doubles	(United States) Bob Bryan (United States) Mike Bryan; 4–6, 6–4, [11–9]	(Spain) David Marrero (Spain) Fernando Verdasco	(United States) Sam Querrey (Colombia) Santiago Giraldo	(Germany) Dustin Brown (United States) Jack Sock (United States) Donald Young (Colombia) Alejandro González
7 Apr	Grand Prix Hassan II; Casablanca, Morocco; ATP World Tour 250; Clay (red) – €485,760 – 28S/16D; Singles – Doubles	(Spain) Guillermo García López; 5–7, 6–4, 6–3	(Spain) Marcel Granollers	(Argentina) Federico Delbonis (Spain) Roberto Carballés Baena	(Romania) Victor Hănescu (Spain) Pablo Carreño Busta (France) Benoît Paire (Russia) Andrey Kuznetsov
7 Apr	Grand Prix Hassan II; Casablanca, Morocco; ATP World Tour 250; Clay (red) – €485,760 – 28S/16D; Singles – Doubles	(Netherlands) Jean-Julien Rojer (Romania) Horia Tecău; 6–2, 6–2	(Poland) Tomasz Bednarek (Czech Republic) Lukáš Dlouhý	(Argentina) Federico Delbonis (Spain) Roberto Carballés Baena	(Romania) Victor Hănescu (Spain) Pablo Carreño Busta (France) Benoît Paire (Russia) Andrey Kuznetsov
14 Apr	Monte-Carlo Rolex Masters; Roquebrune-Cap-Martin, France; ATP World Tour Masters 1000; Clay (red) – €2,884,675 – 56S/28Q/24D; Singles – Doubles	(Switzerland) Stan Wawrinka; 4–6, 7–6^{(7–5)}, 6–2	(Switzerland) Roger Federer	(Spain) David Ferrer (Serbia) Novak Djokovic	(Spain) Rafael Nadal (Canada) Milos Raonic (France) Jo-Wilfried Tsonga (Spain) Guillermo García López
14 Apr	Monte-Carlo Rolex Masters; Roquebrune-Cap-Martin, France; ATP World Tour Masters 1000; Clay (red) – €2,884,675 – 56S/28Q/24D; Singles – Doubles	(United States) Bob Bryan (United States) Mike Bryan; 6–3, 3–6, [10–8]	(Croatia) Ivan Dodig (Brazil) Marcelo Melo	(Spain) David Ferrer (Serbia) Novak Djokovic	(Spain) Rafael Nadal (Canada) Milos Raonic (France) Jo-Wilfried Tsonga (Spain) Guillermo García López
21 Apr	Barcelona Open BancSabadell; Barcelona, Spain; ATP World Tour 500; Clay (red) – €2,127,035 – 48S/16D; Singles – Doubles	(Japan) Kei Nishikori; 6–2, 6–2	(Colombia) Santiago Giraldo	(Spain) Nicolás Almagro (Latvia) Ernests Gulbis	(Spain) Rafael Nadal (Germany) Philipp Kohlschreiber (Croatia) Marin Čilić (Russia) Teymuraz Gabashvili
21 Apr	Barcelona Open BancSabadell; Barcelona, Spain; ATP World Tour 500; Clay (red) – €2,127,035 – 48S/16D; Singles – Doubles	(Netherlands) Jesse Huta Galung (France) Stéphane Robert; 6–3, 6–3	(Canada) Daniel Nestor (Serbia) Nenad Zimonjić	(Spain) Nicolás Almagro (Latvia) Ernests Gulbis	(Spain) Rafael Nadal (Germany) Philipp Kohlschreiber (Croatia) Marin Čilić (Russia) Teymuraz Gabashvili
21 Apr	BRD Năstase Țiriac Trophy; Bucharest, Romania; ATP World Tour 250; Clay (red) – €485,760 – 28S/16D; Singles – Doubles	(Bulgaria) Grigor Dimitrov; 7–6^{(7–2)}, 6–1	(Czech Republic) Lukáš Rosol	(France) Gaël Monfils (Netherlands) Robin Haase	(Ukraine) Sergiy Stakhovsky (France) Paul-Henri Mathieu (France) Gilles Simon (Uzbekistan) Denis Istomin
21 Apr	BRD Năstase Țiriac Trophy; Bucharest, Romania; ATP World Tour 250; Clay (red) – €485,760 – 28S/16D; Singles – Doubles	(Netherlands) Jean-Julien Rojer (Romania) Horia Tecău; 6–4, 6–4	(Poland) Mariusz Fyrstenberg (Poland) Marcin Matkowski	(France) Gaël Monfils (Netherlands) Robin Haase	(Ukraine) Sergiy Stakhovsky (France) Paul-Henri Mathieu (France) Gilles Simon (Uzbekistan) Denis Istomin
28 Apr	BMW Open; Munich, Germany; ATP World Tour 250; Clay (red) – €485,760 – 28S/16D; Singles – Doubles	(Slovakia) Martin Kližan; 2–6, 6–1, 6–2	(Italy) Fabio Fognini	(Germany) Jan-Lennard Struff (Germany) Tommy Haas	(Brazil) Thomaz Bellucci (Lithuania) Ričardas Berankis (Uzbekistan) Denis Istomin (Italy) Andreas Seppi
28 Apr	BMW Open; Munich, Germany; ATP World Tour 250; Clay (red) – €485,760 – 28S/16D; Singles – Doubles	(United Kingdom) Jamie Murray (Australia) John Peers; 6–4, 6–2	(United Kingdom) Colin Fleming (United Kingdom) Ross Hutchins	(Germany) Jan-Lennard Struff (Germany) Tommy Haas	(Brazil) Thomaz Bellucci (Lithuania) Ričardas Berankis (Uzbekistan) Denis Istomin (Italy) Andreas Seppi
28 Apr	Portugal Open; Oeiras, Portugal; ATP World Tour 250; Clay (red) – €485,760 – 28S/16D; Singles – Doubles	(Argentina) Carlos Berlocq; 0–6, 7–5, 6–1	(Czech Republic) Tomáš Berdych	(Romania) Victor Hănescu (Spain) Daniel Gimeno Traver	(Argentina) Leonardo Mayer (Portugal) Gastão Elias (Spain) Marcel Granollers (Canada) Milos Raonic
28 Apr	Portugal Open; Oeiras, Portugal; ATP World Tour 250; Clay (red) – €485,760 – 28S/16D; Singles – Doubles	(Mexico) Santiago González (United States) Scott Lipsky; 6–3, 3–6, [10–8]	(Uruguay) Pablo Cuevas (Spain) David Marrero	(Romania) Victor Hănescu (Spain) Daniel Gimeno Traver	(Argentina) Leonardo Mayer (Portugal) Gastão Elias (Spain) Marcel Granollers (Canada) Milos Raonic

=== May ===
Week	Tournament	Champions	Runners-up	Semifinalists	Quarterfinalists
5 May	Mutua Madrid Open; Madrid, Spain; ATP World Tour Masters 1000; Clay (red) – €3,671,405 – 56S/28Q/24D; Singles – Doubles	(Spain) Rafael Nadal; 2–6, 6–4, 3–0 retired	(Japan) Kei Nishikori	(Spain) Roberto Bautista Agut (Spain) David Ferrer	(Czech Republic) Tomáš Berdych (Colombia) Santiago Giraldo (Spain) Feliciano López (Latvia) Ernests Gulbis
5 May	Mutua Madrid Open; Madrid, Spain; ATP World Tour Masters 1000; Clay (red) – €3,671,405 – 56S/28Q/24D; Singles – Doubles	(Canada) Daniel Nestor (Serbia) Nenad Zimonjić; 6–4, 6–2	(United States) Bob Bryan (United States) Mike Bryan	(Spain) Roberto Bautista Agut (Spain) David Ferrer	(Czech Republic) Tomáš Berdych (Colombia) Santiago Giraldo (Spain) Feliciano López (Latvia) Ernests Gulbis
12 May	Internazionali BNL d'Italia; Rome, Italy; ATP World Tour Masters 1000; Clay (red) – €2,884,675 – 56S/28Q/24D; Singles – Doubles	(Serbia) Novak Djokovic; 4–6, 6–3, 6–3	(Spain) Rafael Nadal	(Bulgaria) Grigor Dimitrov (Canada) Milos Raonic	(United Kingdom) Andy Murray (Germany) Tommy Haas (France) Jérémy Chardy (Spain) David Ferrer
12 May	Internazionali BNL d'Italia; Rome, Italy; ATP World Tour Masters 1000; Clay (red) – €2,884,675 – 56S/28Q/24D; Singles – Doubles	(Canada) Daniel Nestor (Serbia) Nenad Zimonjić; 6–4, 7–6^{(7–2)}	(Netherlands) Robin Haase (Spain) Feliciano López	(Bulgaria) Grigor Dimitrov (Canada) Milos Raonic	(United Kingdom) Andy Murray (Germany) Tommy Haas (France) Jérémy Chardy (Spain) David Ferrer
19 May	Düsseldorf Open; Düsseldorf, Germany; ATP World Tour 250; Clay (red) – €485,760 – 28S/16D; Singles – Doubles	(Germany) Philipp Kohlschreiber; 6–2, 7–6^{(7–4)}	(Croatia) Ivo Karlović	(Uzbekistan) Denis Istomin (Czech Republic) Jiří Veselý	(Croatia) Mate Delić (Italy) Andreas Seppi (Austria) Jürgen Melzer (Argentina) Juan Mónaco
19 May	Düsseldorf Open; Düsseldorf, Germany; ATP World Tour 250; Clay (red) – €485,760 – 28S/16D; Singles – Doubles	(Mexico) Santiago González (United States) Scott Lipsky; 7–5, 4–6, [10–3]	(Germany) Martin Emmrich (Germany) Christopher Kas	(Uzbekistan) Denis Istomin (Czech Republic) Jiří Veselý	(Croatia) Mate Delić (Italy) Andreas Seppi (Austria) Jürgen Melzer (Argentina) Juan Mónaco
19 May	Open de Nice Côte d'Azur; Nice, France; ATP World Tour 250; Clay (red) – €485,760 – 28S/16D; Singles – Doubles	(Latvia) Ernests Gulbis; 6–1, 7–6^{(7–5)}	(Argentina) Federico Delbonis	(France) Gilles Simon (Spain) Albert Montañés	(United States) John Isner (Argentina) Carlos Berlocq (Argentina) Leonardo Mayer (Russia) Dmitry Tursunov
19 May	Open de Nice Côte d'Azur; Nice, France; ATP World Tour 250; Clay (red) – €485,760 – 28S/16D; Singles – Doubles	(Slovakia) Martin Kližan (Austria) Philipp Oswald; 6–2, 6–0	(India) Rohan Bopanna (Pakistan) Aisam-ul-Haq Qureshi	(France) Gilles Simon (Spain) Albert Montañés	(United States) John Isner (Argentina) Carlos Berlocq (Argentina) Leonardo Mayer (Russia) Dmitry Tursunov
26 May; 2 Jun	French Open; Paris, France; Grand Slam; Clay (red) – €11,552,000; 128S/64D/32X; Singles – Doubles – Mixed doubles	(Spain) Rafael Nadal; 3–6, 7–5, 6–2, 6–4	(Serbia) Novak Djokovic	(United Kingdom) Andy Murray (Latvia) Ernests Gulbis	(Spain) David Ferrer (France) Gaël Monfils (Czech Republic) Tomáš Berdych (Canada) Milos Raonic
26 May; 2 Jun	French Open; Paris, France; Grand Slam; Clay (red) – €11,552,000; 128S/64D/32X; Singles – Doubles – Mixed doubles	(France) Julien Benneteau (France) Édouard Roger-Vasselin; 6–3, 7–6^{(7–1)}	(Spain) Marcel Granollers (Spain) Marc López	(United Kingdom) Andy Murray (Latvia) Ernests Gulbis	(Spain) David Ferrer (France) Gaël Monfils (Czech Republic) Tomáš Berdych (Canada) Milos Raonic
26 May; 2 Jun	French Open; Paris, France; Grand Slam; Clay (red) – €11,552,000; 128S/64D/32X; Singles – Doubles – Mixed doubles	(Germany) Anna-Lena Grönefeld (Netherlands) Jean-Julien Rojer; 4–6, 6–2, [10–7]	(Germany) Julia Görges (Serbia) Nenad Zimonjić	(United Kingdom) Andy Murray (Latvia) Ernests Gulbis	(Spain) David Ferrer (France) Gaël Monfils (Czech Republic) Tomáš Berdych (Canada) Milos Raonic

=== June ===
Week	Tournament	Champions	Runners-up	Semifinalists	Quarterfinalists
9 Jun	Gerry Weber Open; Halle, Germany; ATP World Tour 250; Grass – €809,600 – 28S/16D; Singles – Doubles	(Switzerland) Roger Federer; 7–6^{(7–2)}, 7–6^{(7–3)}	(Colombia) Alejandro Falla	(Germany) Philipp Kohlschreiber (Japan) Kei Nishikori	(Germany) Dustin Brown (Germany) Peter Gojowczyk (United States) Steve Johnson (Chinese Taipei) Lu Yen-hsun
9 Jun	Gerry Weber Open; Halle, Germany; ATP World Tour 250; Grass – €809,600 – 28S/16D; Singles – Doubles	(Germany) Andre Begemann (Austria) Julian Knowle; 1–6, 7–5, [12–10]	(Switzerland) Marco Chiudinelli (Switzerland) Roger Federer	(Germany) Philipp Kohlschreiber (Japan) Kei Nishikori	(Germany) Dustin Brown (Germany) Peter Gojowczyk (United States) Steve Johnson (Chinese Taipei) Lu Yen-hsun
9 Jun	Aegon Championships; London, United Kingdom; ATP World Tour 250; Grass – €809,600 – 56S/24D; Singles – Doubles	(Bulgaria) Grigor Dimitrov; 6–7^{(8–10)}, 7–6^{(7–1)}, 7–6^{(8–6)}	(Spain) Feliciano López	(Switzerland) Stan Wawrinka (Czech Republic) Radek Štěpánek	(Australia) Marinko Matosevic (Ukraine) Alexandr Dolgopolov (South Africa) Kevin Anderson (Czech Republic) Tomáš Berdych
9 Jun	Aegon Championships; London, United Kingdom; ATP World Tour 250; Grass – €809,600 – 56S/24D; Singles – Doubles	(Austria) Alexander Peya (Brazil) Bruno Soares; 4–6, 7–6^{(7–4)}, [10–4]	(United Kingdom) Jamie Murray (Australia) John Peers	(Switzerland) Stan Wawrinka (Czech Republic) Radek Štěpánek	(Australia) Marinko Matosevic (Ukraine) Alexandr Dolgopolov (South Africa) Kevin Anderson (Czech Republic) Tomáš Berdych
16 Jun	Topshelf Open 's-Hertogenbosch, Netherlands; ATP World Tour 250; Grass – €485,760 – 32S/16D; Singles – Doubles	(Spain) Roberto Bautista Agut; 2–6, 7–6^{(7–2)}, 6–4	(Germany) Benjamin Becker	(Portugal) João Sousa (Austria) Jürgen Melzer	(Netherlands) Thiemo de Bakker (Canada) Vasek Pospisil (France) Nicolas Mahut (Spain) Fernando Verdasco
16 Jun	Topshelf Open 's-Hertogenbosch, Netherlands; ATP World Tour 250; Grass – €485,760 – 32S/16D; Singles – Doubles	(Netherlands) Jean-Julien Rojer (Romania) Horia Tecău; 6–3, 7–6^{(7–3)}	(Mexico) Santiago González (United States) Scott Lipsky	(Portugal) João Sousa (Austria) Jürgen Melzer	(Netherlands) Thiemo de Bakker (Canada) Vasek Pospisil (France) Nicolas Mahut (Spain) Fernando Verdasco
16 Jun	Aegon International; Eastbourne, United Kingdom; ATP World Tour 250; Grass – €485,760 – 28S/16D; Singles – Doubles	(Spain) Feliciano López; 6–3, 6–7^{(5–7)}, 7–5	(France) Richard Gasquet	(Uzbekistan) Denis Istomin (United States) Sam Querrey	(Slovakia) Martin Kližan (France) Édouard Roger-Vasselin (France) Jérémy Chardy (France) Julien Benneteau
16 Jun	Aegon International; Eastbourne, United Kingdom; ATP World Tour 250; Grass – €485,760 – 28S/16D; Singles – Doubles	(Philippines) Treat Huey (United Kingdom) Dominic Inglot; 7–5, 5–7, [10–8]	(Austria) Alexander Peya (Brazil) Bruno Soares	(Uzbekistan) Denis Istomin (United States) Sam Querrey	(Slovakia) Martin Kližan (France) Édouard Roger-Vasselin (France) Jérémy Chardy (France) Julien Benneteau
23 Jun; 30 Jun	The Championships, Wimbledon; London, United Kingdom; Grand Slam; Grass – £11,715,000; 128S/64D/48X; Singles – Doubles – Mixed doubles	(Serbia) Novak Djokovic; 6–7^{(7–9)}, 6–4, 7–6^{(7–4)}, 5–7, 6–4	(Switzerland) Roger Federer	(Bulgaria) Grigor Dimitrov (Canada) Milos Raonic	(Croatia) Marin Čilić (United Kingdom) Andy Murray (Switzerland) Stan Wawrinka (Australia) Nick Kyrgios
23 Jun; 30 Jun	The Championships, Wimbledon; London, United Kingdom; Grand Slam; Grass – £11,715,000; 128S/64D/48X; Singles – Doubles – Mixed doubles	(Canada) Vasek Pospisil (United States) Jack Sock; 7–6^{(7–5)}, 6–7^{(3–7)}, 6–4, 3–6, 7–5	(United States) Bob Bryan (United States) Mike Bryan	(Bulgaria) Grigor Dimitrov (Canada) Milos Raonic	(Croatia) Marin Čilić (United Kingdom) Andy Murray (Switzerland) Stan Wawrinka (Australia) Nick Kyrgios
23 Jun; 30 Jun	The Championships, Wimbledon; London, United Kingdom; Grand Slam; Grass – £11,715,000; 128S/64D/48X; Singles – Doubles – Mixed doubles	(Serbia) Nenad Zimonjić (Australia) Samantha Stosur; 6–4, 6–2	(Belarus) Max Mirnyi (Chinese Taipei) Chan Hao-ching	(Bulgaria) Grigor Dimitrov (Canada) Milos Raonic	(Croatia) Marin Čilić (United Kingdom) Andy Murray (Switzerland) Stan Wawrinka (Australia) Nick Kyrgios

=== July ===
Week	Tournament	Champions	Runners-up	Semifinalists	Quarterfinalists
7 Jul	Hall of Fame Tennis Championships; Newport, United States; ATP World Tour 250; Grass – $539,730 – 32S/16D; Singles – Doubles	(Australia) Lleyton Hewitt; 6–3, 6–7^{(4–7)}, 7–6^{(7–3)}	(Croatia) Ivo Karlović	(United States) Jack Sock (Australia) Samuel Groth	(United States) John Isner (United States) Steve Johnson (France) Nicolas Mahut (Israel) Dudi Sela
7 Jul	Hall of Fame Tennis Championships; Newport, United States; ATP World Tour 250; Grass – $539,730 – 32S/16D; Singles – Doubles	(Australia) Chris Guccione (Australia) Lleyton Hewitt; 7–5, 6–4	(Israel) Jonathan Erlich (United States) Rajeev Ram	(United States) Jack Sock (Australia) Samuel Groth	(United States) John Isner (United States) Steve Johnson (France) Nicolas Mahut (Israel) Dudi Sela
7 Jul	MercedesCup; Stuttgart, Germany; ATP World Tour 250; Clay (red) – €426,605 – 28S/16D; Singles – Doubles	(Spain) Roberto Bautista Agut; 6–3, 4–6, 6–2	(Czech Republic) Lukáš Rosol	(Italy) Fabio Fognini (Russia) Mikhail Youzhny	(Colombia) Santiago Giraldo (Spain) Guillermo García López (Spain) Feliciano López (Argentina) Federico Delbonis
7 Jul	MercedesCup; Stuttgart, Germany; ATP World Tour 250; Clay (red) – €426,605 – 28S/16D; Singles – Doubles	(Poland) Mateusz Kowalczyk (New Zealand) Artem Sitak; 2–6, 6–1, [10–7]	(Spain) Guillermo García López (Austria) Philipp Oswald	(Italy) Fabio Fognini (Russia) Mikhail Youzhny	(Colombia) Santiago Giraldo (Spain) Guillermo García López (Spain) Feliciano López (Argentina) Federico Delbonis
7 Jul	Swedish Open; Båstad, Sweden; ATP World Tour 250; Clay (red) – €485,760 – 28S/16D; Singles – Doubles	(Uruguay) Pablo Cuevas; 6–2, 6–1	(Portugal) João Sousa	(Argentina) Carlos Berlocq (Spain) Fernando Verdasco	(Spain) David Ferrer (Serbia) Dušan Lajović (Spain) Pablo Carreño Busta (Argentina) Renzo Olivo
7 Jul	Swedish Open; Båstad, Sweden; ATP World Tour 250; Clay (red) – €485,760 – 28S/16D; Singles – Doubles	(Sweden) Johan Brunström (United States) Nicholas Monroe; 4–6, 7–6^{(7–5)}, [10–7]	(France) Jérémy Chardy (Austria) Oliver Marach	(Argentina) Carlos Berlocq (Spain) Fernando Verdasco	(Spain) David Ferrer (Serbia) Dušan Lajović (Spain) Pablo Carreño Busta (Argentina) Renzo Olivo
14 Jul	International German Open; Hamburg, Germany; ATP World Tour 500; Clay (red) – €1,322,150 – 48S/16D; Singles – Doubles	(Argentina) Leonardo Mayer; 6–7^{(3–7)}, 6–1, 7–6^{(7–4)}	(Spain) David Ferrer	(Germany) Alexander Zverev (Germany) Philipp Kohlschreiber	(Spain) Pablo Andújar (Germany) Tobias Kamke (Czech Republic) Lukáš Rosol (Serbia) Dušan Lajović
14 Jul	International German Open; Hamburg, Germany; ATP World Tour 500; Clay (red) – €1,322,150 – 48S/16D; Singles – Doubles	(Croatia) Marin Draganja (Romania) Florin Mergea; 6–4, 7–5	(Austria) Alexander Peya (Brazil) Bruno Soares	(Germany) Alexander Zverev (Germany) Philipp Kohlschreiber	(Spain) Pablo Andújar (Germany) Tobias Kamke (Czech Republic) Lukáš Rosol (Serbia) Dušan Lajović
14 Jul	Claro Open Colombia; Bogotá, Colombia; ATP World Tour 250; Hard – $755,625 – 28S/16D; Singles – Doubles	(Australia) Bernard Tomic; 7–6^{(7–5)}, 3–6, 7–6^{(7–4)}	(Croatia) Ivo Karlović	(Dominican Republic) Víctor Estrella Burgos (Czech Republic) Radek Štěpánek	(France) Richard Gasquet (Canada) Vasek Pospisil (Colombia) Alejandro González (Chinese Taipei) Jimmy Wang
14 Jul	Claro Open Colombia; Bogotá, Colombia; ATP World Tour 250; Hard – $755,625 – 28S/16D; Singles – Doubles	(Australia) Samuel Groth (Australia) Chris Guccione; 7–6^{(7–5)}, 6–7^{(3–7)}, [11–9]	(Colombia) Nicolás Barrientos (Colombia) Juan Sebastián Cabal	(Dominican Republic) Víctor Estrella Burgos (Czech Republic) Radek Štěpánek	(France) Richard Gasquet (Canada) Vasek Pospisil (Colombia) Alejandro González (Chinese Taipei) Jimmy Wang
21 Jul	BB&T Atlanta Open; Atlanta, United States; ATP World Tour 250; Hard – $647,675 – 28S/16D; Singles – Doubles	(United States) John Isner; 6–3, 6–4	(Israel) Dudi Sela	(United States) Jack Sock (Germany) Benjamin Becker	(Australia) Marinko Matosevic (Slovakia) Lukáš Lacko (Canada) Vasek Pospisil (Netherlands) Thiemo de Bakker
21 Jul	BB&T Atlanta Open; Atlanta, United States; ATP World Tour 250; Hard – $647,675 – 28S/16D; Singles – Doubles	(Canada) Vasek Pospisil (United States) Jack Sock; 6–3, 5–7, [10–5]	(United States) Steve Johnson (United States) Sam Querrey	(United States) Jack Sock (Germany) Benjamin Becker	(Australia) Marinko Matosevic (Slovakia) Lukáš Lacko (Canada) Vasek Pospisil (Netherlands) Thiemo de Bakker
21 Jul	Crédit Agricole Suisse Open Gstaad; Gstaad, Switzerland; ATP World Tour 250; Clay (red) – €485,760 – 28S/16D; Singles – Doubles	(Spain) Pablo Andújar; 6–3, 7–5	(Argentina) Juan Mónaco	(Netherlands) Robin Haase (Spain) Fernando Verdasco	(Russia) Mikhail Youzhny (Brazil) Thomaz Bellucci (Serbia) Viktor Troicki (Spain) Marcel Granollers
21 Jul	Crédit Agricole Suisse Open Gstaad; Gstaad, Switzerland; ATP World Tour 250; Clay (red) – €485,760 – 28S/16D; Singles – Doubles	(Germany) Andre Begemann (Netherlands) Robin Haase; 6–3, 6–4	(Australia) Rameez Junaid (Slovakia) Michal Mertiňák	(Netherlands) Robin Haase (Spain) Fernando Verdasco	(Russia) Mikhail Youzhny (Brazil) Thomaz Bellucci (Serbia) Viktor Troicki (Spain) Marcel Granollers
21 Jul	ATP Vegeta Croatia Open Umag; Umag, Croatia; ATP World Tour 250; Clay (red) – €485,760 – 28S/16D; Singles – Doubles	(Uruguay) Pablo Cuevas; 6–3, 6–4	(Spain) Tommy Robredo	(Italy) Fabio Fognini (Croatia) Marin Čilić	(Croatia) Borna Ćorić (Russia) Teymuraz Gabashvili (Czech Republic) Lukáš Rosol (Spain) Pablo Carreño Busta
21 Jul	ATP Vegeta Croatia Open Umag; Umag, Croatia; ATP World Tour 250; Clay (red) – €485,760 – 28S/16D; Singles – Doubles	(Czech Republic) František Čermák (Czech Republic) Lukáš Rosol; 6–4, 7–6^{(7–5)}	(Serbia) Dušan Lajović (Croatia) Franko Škugor	(Italy) Fabio Fognini (Croatia) Marin Čilić	(Croatia) Borna Ćorić (Russia) Teymuraz Gabashvili (Czech Republic) Lukáš Rosol (Spain) Pablo Carreño Busta
28 Jul	Citi Open; Washington, D.C., United States; ATP World Tour 500; Hard – $1,654,295 – 48S/16D; Singles – Doubles	(Canada) Milos Raonic; 6–1, 6–4	(Canada) Vasek Pospisil	(France) Richard Gasquet (United States) Donald Young	(Colombia) Santiago Giraldo (Japan) Kei Nishikori (South Africa) Kevin Anderson (United States) Steve Johnson
28 Jul	Citi Open; Washington, D.C., United States; ATP World Tour 500; Hard – $1,654,295 – 48S/16D; Singles – Doubles	(Netherlands) Jean-Julien Rojer (Romania) Horia Tecău; 7–5, 6–4	(Australia) Sam Groth (India) Leander Paes	(France) Richard Gasquet (United States) Donald Young	(Colombia) Santiago Giraldo (Japan) Kei Nishikori (South Africa) Kevin Anderson (United States) Steve Johnson
28 Jul	bet-at-home Cup; Kitzbühel, Austria; ATP World Tour 250; Clay (red) – €485,760 – 28S/16D; Singles – Doubles	(Belgium) David Goffin; 4–6, 6–1, 6–3	(Austria) Dominic Thiem	(Argentina) Máximo González (Argentina) Juan Mónaco	(Italy) Paolo Lorenzi (Czech Republic) Lukáš Rosol (Italy) Andreas Seppi (Spain) Marcel Granollers
28 Jul	bet-at-home Cup; Kitzbühel, Austria; ATP World Tour 250; Clay (red) – €485,760 – 28S/16D; Singles – Doubles	(Finland) Henri Kontinen (Finland) Jarkko Nieminen; 6–1, 6–4	(Italy) Daniele Bracciali (Kazakhstan) Andrey Golubev	(Argentina) Máximo González (Argentina) Juan Mónaco	(Italy) Paolo Lorenzi (Czech Republic) Lukáš Rosol (Italy) Andreas Seppi (Spain) Marcel Granollers

=== August ===
Week	Tournament	Champions	Runners-up	Semifinalists	Quarterfinalists
4 Aug	Rogers Cup; Toronto, Canada; ATP World Tour Masters 1000; Hard – $3,146,920 – 56S/28Q/24D; Singles – Doubles	(France) Jo-Wilfried Tsonga; 7–5, 7–6^{(7–3)}	(Switzerland) Roger Federer	(Bulgaria) Grigor Dimitrov (Spain) Feliciano López	(United Kingdom) Andy Murray (South Africa) Kevin Anderson (Canada) Milos Raonic (Spain) David Ferrer
4 Aug	Rogers Cup; Toronto, Canada; ATP World Tour Masters 1000; Hard – $3,146,920 – 56S/28Q/24D; Singles – Doubles	(Austria) Alexander Peya (Brazil) Bruno Soares; 6–4, 6–3	(Croatia) Ivan Dodig (Brazil) Marcelo Melo	(Bulgaria) Grigor Dimitrov (Spain) Feliciano López	(United Kingdom) Andy Murray (South Africa) Kevin Anderson (Canada) Milos Raonic (Spain) David Ferrer
11 Aug	Western & Southern Open; Mason, United States; ATP World Tour Masters 1000; Hard – $3,356,715 – 56S/28Q/24D; Singles – Doubles	(Switzerland) Roger Federer; 6–3, 1–6, 6–2	(Spain) David Ferrer	(France) Julien Benneteau (Canada) Milos Raonic	(Spain) Tommy Robredo (Switzerland) Stan Wawrinka (Italy) Fabio Fognini (United Kingdom) Andy Murray
11 Aug	Western & Southern Open; Mason, United States; ATP World Tour Masters 1000; Hard – $3,356,715 – 56S/28Q/24D; Singles – Doubles	(United States) Bob Bryan (United States) Mike Bryan; 6–3, 6–2	(Canada) Vasek Pospisil (United States) Jack Sock	(France) Julien Benneteau (Canada) Milos Raonic	(Spain) Tommy Robredo (Switzerland) Stan Wawrinka (Italy) Fabio Fognini (United Kingdom) Andy Murray
18 Aug	Winston-Salem Open; Winston-Salem, United States; ATP World Tour 250; Hard – $683,705 – 48S/27Q/16D; Singles – Doubles	(Czech Republic) Lukáš Rosol; 3–6, 7–6^{(7–3)}, 7–5	(Poland) Jerzy Janowicz	(Chinese Taipei) Lu Yen-hsun (United States) Sam Querrey	(United States) John Isner (Italy) Andreas Seppi (Belgium) David Goffin (Spain) Guillermo García López
18 Aug	Winston-Salem Open; Winston-Salem, United States; ATP World Tour 250; Hard – $683,705 – 48S/27Q/16D; Singles – Doubles	(Colombia) Juan Sebastián Cabal (Colombia) Robert Farah; 6–3, 6–4	(United Kingdom) Jamie Murray (Australia) John Peers	(Chinese Taipei) Lu Yen-hsun (United States) Sam Querrey	(United States) John Isner (Italy) Andreas Seppi (Belgium) David Goffin (Spain) Guillermo García López
25 Aug; 1 Sep	US Open; New York City, United States; Grand Slam; Hard – $17,852,000; 128S/64D/32X; Singles – Doubles – Mixed doubles	(Croatia) Marin Čilić; 6–3, 6–3, 6–3	(Japan) Kei Nishikori	(Serbia) Novak Djokovic (Switzerland) Roger Federer	(United Kingdom) Andy Murray (Switzerland) Stan Wawrinka (Czech Republic) Tomáš Berdych (France) Gaël Monfils
25 Aug; 1 Sep	US Open; New York City, United States; Grand Slam; Hard – $17,852,000; 128S/64D/32X; Singles – Doubles – Mixed doubles	(United States) Bob Bryan (United States) Mike Bryan; 6–3, 6–4	(Spain) Marcel Granollers (Spain) Marc López	(Serbia) Novak Djokovic (Switzerland) Roger Federer	(United Kingdom) Andy Murray (Switzerland) Stan Wawrinka (Czech Republic) Tomáš Berdych (France) Gaël Monfils
25 Aug; 1 Sep	US Open; New York City, United States; Grand Slam; Hard – $17,852,000; 128S/64D/32X; Singles – Doubles – Mixed doubles	(India) Sania Mirza (Brazil) Bruno Soares; 6–1, 2–6, [11–9]	(United States) Abigail Spears (Mexico) Santiago González	(Serbia) Novak Djokovic (Switzerland) Roger Federer	(United Kingdom) Andy Murray (Switzerland) Stan Wawrinka (Czech Republic) Tomáš Berdych (France) Gaël Monfils

=== September ===
Week	Tournament	Champions	Runners-up	Semifinalists	Quarterfinalists
8 Sep	Davis Cup Semifinals; Paris, France – clay (red); Geneva, Switzerland – hard (i)	Semifinal winners France 4–1; Switzerland 3–2	Semifinal losers Czech Republic; Italy		
15 Sep	Moselle Open; Metz, France; ATP World Tour 250; Hard (i) – €485,760 – 28S/16D; Singles – Doubles	(Belgium) David Goffin; 6–4, 6–3	(Portugal) João Sousa	(Germany) Jan-Lennard Struff (France) Gaël Monfils	(France) Jo-Wilfried Tsonga (Germany) Philipp Kohlschreiber (France) Paul-Henri Mathieu (Poland) Jerzy Janowicz
15 Sep	Moselle Open; Metz, France; ATP World Tour 250; Hard (i) – €485,760 – 28S/16D; Singles – Doubles	(Poland) Mariusz Fyrstenberg (Poland) Marcin Matkowski; 6–7^{(3–7)}, 6–3, [10–8]	(Croatia) Marin Draganja (Finland) Henri Kontinen	(Germany) Jan-Lennard Struff (France) Gaël Monfils	(France) Jo-Wilfried Tsonga (Germany) Philipp Kohlschreiber (France) Paul-Henri Mathieu (Poland) Jerzy Janowicz
22 Sep	ATP Shenzhen Open; Shenzhen, China; ATP World Tour 250; Hard – $655,955 – 28S/16D; Singles – Doubles	(United Kingdom) Andy Murray; 5–7, 7–6^{(11–9)}, 6–1	(Spain) Tommy Robredo	(Colombia) Santiago Giraldo (Argentina) Juan Mónaco	(Serbia) Viktor Troicki (Italy) Andreas Seppi (France) Richard Gasquet (Slovakia) Lukáš Lacko
22 Sep	ATP Shenzhen Open; Shenzhen, China; ATP World Tour 250; Hard – $655,955 – 28S/16D; Singles – Doubles	(Netherlands) Jean-Julien Rojer (Romania) Horia Tecău; 6–4, 7–6^{(7–4)}	(Australia) Chris Guccione (Australia) Sam Groth	(Colombia) Santiago Giraldo (Argentina) Juan Mónaco	(Serbia) Viktor Troicki (Italy) Andreas Seppi (France) Richard Gasquet (Slovakia) Lukáš Lacko
22 Sep	Malaysian Open; Kuala Lumpur, Malaysia; ATP World Tour 250; Hard (i) – $1,022,255 – 28S/16D; Singles – Doubles	(Japan) Kei Nishikori; 7–6^{(7–4)}, 6–4	(France) Julien Benneteau	(Finland) Jarkko Nieminen (Latvia) Ernests Gulbis	(Australia) Marinko Matosevic (Spain) Pablo Andújar (Uruguay) Pablo Cuevas (Germany) Benjamin Becker
22 Sep	Malaysian Open; Kuala Lumpur, Malaysia; ATP World Tour 250; Hard (i) – $1,022,255 – 28S/16D; Singles – Doubles	(Poland) Marcin Matkowski (India) Leander Paes; 3–6, 7–6^{(7–5)}, [10–5]	(United Kingdom) Jamie Murray (Australia) John Peers	(Finland) Jarkko Nieminen (Latvia) Ernests Gulbis	(Australia) Marinko Matosevic (Spain) Pablo Andújar (Uruguay) Pablo Cuevas (Germany) Benjamin Becker
29 Sep	China Open; Beijing, China; ATP World Tour 500; Hard – $3,755,065 – 32S/16D; Singles – Doubles	(Serbia) Novak Djokovic; 6–0, 6–2	(Czech Republic) Tomáš Berdych	(United Kingdom) Andy Murray (Slovakia) Martin Kližan	(Bulgaria) Grigor Dimitrov (Croatia) Marin Čilić (United States) John Isner (Spain) Rafael Nadal
29 Sep	China Open; Beijing, China; ATP World Tour 500; Hard – $3,755,065 – 32S/16D; Singles – Doubles	(Netherlands) Jean-Julien Rojer (Romania) Horia Tecău; 6–7^{(6–8)}, 7–5, [10–5]	(France) Julien Benneteau (Canada) Vasek Pospisil	(United Kingdom) Andy Murray (Slovakia) Martin Kližan	(Bulgaria) Grigor Dimitrov (Croatia) Marin Čilić (United States) John Isner (Spain) Rafael Nadal
29 Sep	Rakuten Japan Open Tennis Championships; Tokyo, Japan; ATP World Tour 500; Hard – $1,373,420 – 32S/16D; Singles – Doubles	(Japan) Kei Nishikori; 7–6^{(7–5)}, 4–6, 6–4	(Canada) Milos Raonic	(Germany) Benjamin Becker (France) Gilles Simon	(United States) Jack Sock (France) Jérémy Chardy (Uzbekistan) Denis Istomin (United States) Steve Johnson
29 Sep	Rakuten Japan Open Tennis Championships; Tokyo, Japan; ATP World Tour 500; Hard – $1,373,420 – 32S/16D; Singles – Doubles	(France) Pierre-Hugues Herbert (Poland) Michał Przysiężny; 6–3, 6–7^{(3–7)}, [10–5]	(Croatia) Ivan Dodig (Brazil) Marcelo Melo	(Germany) Benjamin Becker (France) Gilles Simon	(United States) Jack Sock (France) Jérémy Chardy (Uzbekistan) Denis Istomin (United States) Steve Johnson

=== October ===
Week	Tournament	Champions	Runners-up	Semifinalists	Quarterfinalists
6 Oct	Shanghai Rolex Masters; Shanghai, China; ATP World Tour Masters 1000; Hard – $4,195,895 – 56S/28Q/24D; Singles – Doubles	(Switzerland) Roger Federer; 7–6^{(8–6)}, 7–6^{(7–2)}	(France) Gilles Simon	(Serbia) Novak Djokovic (Spain) Feliciano López	(Spain) David Ferrer (France) Julien Benneteau (Czech Republic) Tomáš Berdych (Russia) Mikhail Youzhny
6 Oct	Shanghai Rolex Masters; Shanghai, China; ATP World Tour Masters 1000; Hard – $4,195,895 – 56S/28Q/24D; Singles – Doubles	(United States) Bob Bryan (United States) Mike Bryan; 6–3, 7–6^{(7–3)}	(France) Julien Benneteau (France) Édouard Roger-Vasselin	(Serbia) Novak Djokovic (Spain) Feliciano López	(Spain) David Ferrer (France) Julien Benneteau (Czech Republic) Tomáš Berdych (Russia) Mikhail Youzhny
13 Oct	Kremlin Cup; Moscow, Russia; ATP World Tour 250; Hard (i) – $855,490 – 28S/16D; Singles – Doubles	(Croatia) Marin Čilić; 6–4, 6–4	(Spain) Roberto Bautista Agut	(Latvia) Ernests Gulbis (Kazakhstan) Mikhail Kukushkin	(Lithuania) Ričardas Berankis (Italy) Andreas Seppi (Russia) Mikhail Youzhny (Spain) Tommy Robredo
13 Oct	Kremlin Cup; Moscow, Russia; ATP World Tour 250; Hard (i) – $855,490 – 28S/16D; Singles – Doubles	(Czech Republic) František Čermák (Czech Republic) Jiří Veselý; 7–6^{(7–2)}, 7–5	(Australia) Sam Groth (Australia) Chris Guccione	(Latvia) Ernests Gulbis (Kazakhstan) Mikhail Kukushkin	(Lithuania) Ričardas Berankis (Italy) Andreas Seppi (Russia) Mikhail Youzhny (Spain) Tommy Robredo
13 Oct	Stockholm Open; Stockholm, Sweden; ATP World Tour 250; Hard (i) – €593,705 – 28S/16D; Singles – Doubles	(Czech Republic) Tomáš Berdych; 5–7, 6–4, 6–4	(Bulgaria) Grigor Dimitrov	(Germany) Matthias Bachinger (Australia) Bernard Tomic	(Romania) Marius Copil (France) Adrian Mannarino (Spain) Fernando Verdasco (United States) Jack Sock
13 Oct	Stockholm Open; Stockholm, Sweden; ATP World Tour 250; Hard (i) – €593,705 – 28S/16D; Singles – Doubles	(United States) Eric Butorac (South Africa) Raven Klaasen; 6–4, 6–3	(Philippines) Treat Huey (United States) Jack Sock	(Germany) Matthias Bachinger (Australia) Bernard Tomic	(Romania) Marius Copil (France) Adrian Mannarino (Spain) Fernando Verdasco (United States) Jack Sock
13 Oct	Erste Bank Open; Vienna, Austria; ATP World Tour 250; Hard (i) – €593,705 – 28S/16D; Singles – Doubles	(United Kingdom) Andy Murray; 5–7, 6–2, 7–5	(Spain) David Ferrer	(Germany) Philipp Kohlschreiber (Serbia) Viktor Troicki	(Croatia) Ivo Karlović (Germany) Benjamin Becker (Brazil) Thomaz Bellucci (Germany) Jan-Lennard Struff
13 Oct	Erste Bank Open; Vienna, Austria; ATP World Tour 250; Hard (i) – €593,705 – 28S/16D; Singles – Doubles	(Austria) Jürgen Melzer (Germany) Philipp Petzschner; 7–6^{(8–6)}, 4–6, [10–7]	(Germany) Andre Begemann (Austria) Julian Knowle	(Germany) Philipp Kohlschreiber (Serbia) Viktor Troicki	(Croatia) Ivo Karlović (Germany) Benjamin Becker (Brazil) Thomaz Bellucci (Germany) Jan-Lennard Struff
20 Oct	Valencia Open 500; Valencia, Spain; ATP World Tour 500; Hard (i) – €2,204,230 – 32S/16D; Singles – Doubles	(United Kingdom) Andy Murray; 3–6, 7–6^{(9–7)}, 7–6^{(10–8)}	(Spain) Tommy Robredo	(Spain) David Ferrer (France) Jérémy Chardy	(Brazil) Thomaz Bellucci (South Africa) Kevin Anderson (Spain) Pablo Carreño Busta (Spain) Pablo Andújar
20 Oct	Valencia Open 500; Valencia, Spain; ATP World Tour 500; Hard (i) – €2,204,230 – 32S/16D; Singles – Doubles	(Netherlands) Jean-Julien Rojer (Romania) Horia Tecău; 6–4, 6–2	(South Africa) Kevin Anderson (France) Jérémy Chardy	(Spain) David Ferrer (France) Jérémy Chardy	(Brazil) Thomaz Bellucci (South Africa) Kevin Anderson (Spain) Pablo Carreño Busta (Spain) Pablo Andújar
20 Oct	Swiss Indoors; Basel, Switzerland; ATP World Tour 500; Hard (i) – €1,915,060 – 32S/16D; Singles – Doubles	(Switzerland) Roger Federer; 6–2, 6–2	(Belgium) David Goffin	(Croatia) Ivo Karlović (Croatia) Borna Ćorić	(Bulgaria) Grigor Dimitrov (Germany) Benjamin Becker (Canada) Milos Raonic (Spain) Rafael Nadal
20 Oct	Swiss Indoors; Basel, Switzerland; ATP World Tour 500; Hard (i) – €1,915,060 – 32S/16D; Singles – Doubles	(Canada) Vasek Pospisil (Serbia) Nenad Zimonjić; 7–6^{(15–13)}, 1–6, [10–5]	(Croatia) Marin Draganja (Finland) Henri Kontinen	(Croatia) Ivo Karlović (Croatia) Borna Ćorić	(Bulgaria) Grigor Dimitrov (Germany) Benjamin Becker (Canada) Milos Raonic (Spain) Rafael Nadal
27 Oct	BNP Paribas Masters; Paris, France; ATP World Tour Masters 1000; Hard (i) – €2,884,675 – 48S/24D; Singles – Doubles	(Serbia) Novak Djokovic; 6–2, 6–3	(Canada) Milos Raonic	(Japan) Kei Nishikori (Czech Republic) Tomáš Berdych	(United Kingdom) Andy Murray (Spain) David Ferrer (South Africa) Kevin Anderson (Switzerland) Roger Federer
27 Oct	BNP Paribas Masters; Paris, France; ATP World Tour Masters 1000; Hard (i) – €2,884,675 – 48S/24D; Singles – Doubles	(United States) Bob Bryan (United States) Mike Bryan; 7–6^{(7–5)}, 5–7, [10–6]	(Poland) Marcin Matkowski (Austria) Jürgen Melzer	(Japan) Kei Nishikori (Czech Republic) Tomáš Berdych	(United Kingdom) Andy Murray (Spain) David Ferrer (South Africa) Kevin Anderson (Switzerland) Roger Federer

=== November ===
Week	Tournament	Champions	Runners-up	Semifinalists	Quarterfinalists
3 Nov	No tournaments scheduled.				
10 Nov	ATP World Tour Finals; London, United Kingdom; ATP World Tour Finals; Hard (i) – $6,000,000 – 8S/8D (RR); Singles – Doubles	(Serbia) Novak Djokovic; Walkover	(Switzerland) Roger Federer	(Japan) Kei Nishikori (Switzerland) Stan Wawrinka	Round Robin (Czech Republic) Tomáš Berdych (Croatia) Marin Čilić (United Kingdom) Andy Murray (Spain) David Ferrer (Canada) Milos Raonic
10 Nov	ATP World Tour Finals; London, United Kingdom; ATP World Tour Finals; Hard (i) – $6,000,000 – 8S/8D (RR); Singles – Doubles	(United States) Bob Bryan (United States) Mike Bryan; 6–7^{(5–7)}, 6–2, [10–7]	(Croatia) Ivan Dodig (Brazil) Marcelo Melo	(Japan) Kei Nishikori (Switzerland) Stan Wawrinka	Round Robin (Czech Republic) Tomáš Berdych (Croatia) Marin Čilić (United Kingdom) Andy Murray (Spain) David Ferrer (Canada) Milos Raonic
17 Nov	Davis Cup Final; Lille, France – clay (red) (i)	Switzerland; 3–1	France		

=== Affected tournaments ===
Week of	Tournament	Status
15 Sep	Tel Aviv Open; Tel Aviv, Israel; ATP World Tour 250	Cancelled due to the ongoing military conflict

== Statistical information ==
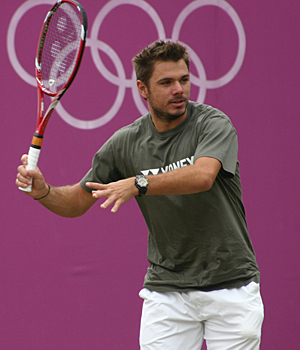
Stanislas Wawrinka won his first Grand Slam title at the Australian Open (def. Nadal).

These tables present the number of singles (S), doubles (D), and mixed doubles (X) titles won by each player and each nation during the season, within all the tournament categories of the 2014 ATP World Tour: the Grand Slam tournaments, the ATP World Tour Finals, the ATP World Tour Masters 1000, the ATP World Tour 500 series, and the ATP World Tour 250 series. The players/nations are sorted by:

1. Total number of titles (a doubles title won by two players representing the same nation counts as only one win for the nation);
2. Cumulated importance of those titles (one Grand Slam win equalling two Masters 1000 wins, one ATP World Tour Finals win equalling one-and-a-half Masters 1000 win, one Masters 1000 win equalling two 500 events wins, one 500 event win equalling two 250 events wins);
3. A singles > doubles > mixed doubles hierarchy;
4. Alphabetical order (by family names for players).

=== Key ===
Grand Slam
ATP World Tour Finals
ATP World Tour Masters 1000
ATP World Tour 500
ATP World Tour 250

=== Titles won by player ===
Total	Player	Grand Slam			ATP Finals		Masters 1000		Tour 500		Tour 250		Total		
Total	Player	S	D	X	S	D	S	D	S	D	S	D	S	D	X
10	Bob Bryan (USA)		●			●		● ● ● ● ● ●				● ●	0	10	0
10	Mike Bryan (USA)		●			●		● ● ● ● ● ●				● ●	0	10	0
9	Jean-Julien Rojer (NED)			●						● ● ●		● ● ● ● ●	0	8	1
8	Horia Tecău (ROU)									● ● ●		● ● ● ● ●	0	8	0
7	Novak Djokovic (SRB)	●			●		● ● ● ●		●				7	0	0
5	Nenad Zimonjić (SRB)			●				● ●		●		●	0	4	1
5	Daniel Nestor (CAN)			●				● ●				● ●	0	4	1
5	Roger Federer (SUI)						● ●		● ●		●		5	0	0
4	Rafael Nadal (ESP)	●					●		●		●		4	0	0
4	Marin Čilić (CRO)	●									● ● ●		4	0	0
4	Kei Nishikori (JPN)								● ●		● ●		4	0	0
3	Stan Wawrinka (SUI)	●					●				●		3	0	0
3	Vasek Pospisil (CAN)		●							●		●	0	3	0
3	Bruno Soares (BRA)			●				●				●	0	2	1
3	Grigor Dimitrov (BUL)								●		● ●		3	0	0
3	Andy Murray (GBR)								●		● ●		3	0	0
3	Tomáš Berdych (CZE)								●		●	●	2	1	0
3	Lleyton Hewitt (AUS)										● ●	●	2	1	0
2	Julien Benneteau (FRA)		●									●	0	2	0
2	Édouard Roger-Vasselin (FRA)		●									●	0	2	0
2	Jack Sock (USA)		●									●	0	2	0
2	Alexander Peya (AUT)							●				●	0	2	0
2	Juan Sebastián Cabal (COL)									●		●	0	2	0
2	Robert Farah (COL)									●		●	0	2	0
2	Florin Mergea (ROU)									●		●	0	2	0
2	Roberto Bautista Agut (ESP)										● ●		2	0	0
2	Pablo Cuevas (URU)										● ●		2	0	0
2	David Goffin (BEL)										● ●		2	0	0
2	Ernests Gulbis (LAT)										● ●		2	0	0
2	John Isner (USA)										● ●		2	0	0
2	Feliciano López (ESP)										●		1	0	0
2	Guillermo García López (ESP)										●	●	1	1	0
2	Martin Kližan (SVK)										●	●	1	1	0
2	Lukáš Rosol (CZE)										●	●	1	1	0
2	Andre Begemann (GER)											● ●	0	2	0
2	Johan Brunström (SWE)											● ●	0	2	0
2	Eric Butorac (USA)											● ●	0	2	0
2	František Čermák (CZE)											● ●	0	2	0
2	Mariusz Fyrstenberg (POL)											● ●	0	2	0
2	Santiago González (MEX)											● ●	0	2	0
2	Chris Guccione (AUS)											● ●	0	2	0
2	Raven Klaasen (RSA)											● ●	0	2	0
2	Julian Knowle (AUT)											● ●	0	2	0
2	Mateusz Kowalczyk (POL)											● ●	0	2	0
2	Scott Lipsky (USA)											● ●	0	2	0
2	Oliver Marach (AUT)											● ●	0	2	0
2	Marcin Matkowski (POL)											● ●	0	2	0
2	Philipp Oswald (AUT)											● ●	0	2	0
1	Łukasz Kubot (POL)		●										0	1	0
1	Robert Lindstedt (SWE)		●										0	1	0
1	Jo-Wilfried Tsonga (FRA)						●						1	0	0
1	Leonardo Mayer (ARG)								●				1	0	0
1	Milos Raonic (CAN)								●				1	0	0
1	Kevin Anderson (RSA)									●			0	1	0
1	Rohan Bopanna (IND)									●			0	1	0
1	Marin Draganja (CRO)									●			0	1	0
1	Matthew Ebden (AUS)									●			0	1	0
1	Jesse Huta Galung (NED)									●			0	1	0
1	Pierre-Hugues Herbert (FRA)									●			0	1	0
1	Michaël Llodra (FRA)									●			0	1	0
1	Nicolas Mahut (FRA)									●			0	1	0
1	Michał Przysiężny (POL)									●			0	1	0
1	Aisam-ul-Haq Qureshi (PAK)									●			0	1	0
1	Stéphane Robert (FRA)									●			0	1	0
1	Pablo Andújar (ESP)										●		1	0	0
1	Carlos Berlocq (ARG)										●		1	0	0
1	Federico Delbonis (ARG)										●		1	0	0
1	Juan Martín del Potro (ARG)										●		1	0	0
1	David Ferrer (ESP)										●		1	0	0
1	Fabio Fognini (ITA)										●		1	0	0
1	Philipp Kohlschreiber (GER)										●		1	0	0
1	Gaël Monfils (FRA)										●		1	0	0
1	Bernard Tomic (AUS)										●		1	0	0
1	Fernando Verdasco (ESP)										●		1	0	0
1	Nikolay Davydenko (RUS)											●	0	1	0
1	Marcel Granollers (ESP)											●	0	1	0
1	Sam Groth (AUS)											●	0	1	0
1	Jan Hájek (CZE)											●	0	1	0
1	Robin Haase (NED)											●	0	1	0
1	Treat Huey (PHI)											●	0	1	0
1	Dominic Inglot (GBR)											●	0	1	0
1	Denis Istomin (UZB)											●	0	1	0
1	Henri Kontinen (FIN)											●	0	1	0
1	Marc López (ESP)											●	0	1	0
1	Marcelo Melo (BRA)											●	0	1	0
1	Jürgen Melzer (AUT)											●	0	1	0
1	Nicholas Monroe (USA)											●	0	1	0
1	Jamie Murray (GRB)											●	0	1	0
1	Frederik Nielsen (DNK)											●	0	1	0
1	Jarkko Nieminen (FIN)											●	0	1	0
1	Leander Paes (IND)											●	0	1	0
1	John Peers (AUS)											●	0	1	0
1	Philipp Petzschner (GER)											●	0	1	0
1	Artem Sitak (NZL)											●	0	1	0
1	Jiří Veselý (CZE)											●	0	1	0

=== Titles won by nation ===
Total	Nation	Grand Slam			ATP Finals		Masters 1000		Tour 500		Tour 250		Total		
Total	Nation	S	D	X	S	D	S	D	S	D	S	D	S	D	X
19	United States (USA)		2			1		6			2	8	2	17	0
15	Spain (ESP)	1					1		1		8	2	11	2	0
12	Serbia (SRB)	1		1	1		4	2	1	1		1	7	4	1
11	Netherlands (NED)			1				1		4		6	0	10	1
10	Romania (ROU)									4		6	0	10	0
9	Canada (CAN)		1	1				2	1	1		3	1	7	1
8	Switzerland (SUI)	1					3		2		2		8	0	0
8	Austria (AUT)							1				7	0	8	0
7	France (FRA)		1				1			3	1	1	2	5	0
6	Poland (POL)		1							1		4	0	6	0
6	Czech Republic (CZE)								1		2	3	3	3	0
6	Australia (AUS)									1	2	3	2	4	0
5	Croatia (CRO)	1								1	3		4	1	0
5	Great Britain (GBR)								1		2	2	3	2	0
4	Brazil (BRA)			1				1				2	0	3	1
4	Japan (JPN)								2		2		4	0	0
4	Argentina (ARG)								1		3		4	0	0
4	Germany (GER)										1	3	1	3	0
3	Sweden (SWE)		1									2	0	3	0
3	Bulgaria (BUL)								1		2		3	0	0
3	South Africa (RSA)									1		2	0	3	0
2	Colombia (COL)									1		1	0	2	0
2	India (IND)									1		1	0	2	0
2	Belgium (BEL)										2		2	0	0
2	Latvia (LAT)										2		2	0	0
2	Uruguay (URU)										2		2	0	0
2	Slovakia (SVK)										1	1	1	1	0
2	Mexico (MEX)											2	0	2	0
1	Pakistan (PAK)									1			0	1	0
1	Italy (ITA)										1		1	0	0
1	Denmark (DNK)											1	0	1	0
1	Finland (FIN)											1	0	1	0
1	New Zealand (NZL)											1	0	1	0
1	Philippines (PHI)											1	0	1	0
1	Russia (RUS)											1	0	1	0
1	Uzbekistan (UZB)											1	0	1	0

=== Titles information ===
The following players won their first main circuit title in singles, doubles, or mixed doubles:

Singles
- (Argentina) Federico Delbonis – São Paulo (draw)
- (Spain) Roberto Bautista Agut – 's-Hertogenbosch (draw)
- (Uruguay) Pablo Cuevas – Båstad (draw)
- (Argentina) Leonardo Mayer – Hamburg (draw)
- (Belgium) David Goffin – Kitzbühel (draw)

Doubles
- (Czech Republic) Jan Hájek – Doha (draw)
- (Colombia) Juan Sebastián Cabal – Rio de Janeiro (draw)
- (Colombia) Robert Farah – Rio de Janeiro (draw)
- (South Africa) Kevin Anderson – Acapulco (draw)
- (Austria) Philipp Oswald – São Paulo (draw)
- (Netherlands) Jesse Huta Galung – Barcelona (draw)
- (France) Stéphane Robert – Barcelona (draw)
- (Canada) Vasek Pospisil – Wimbledon (draw)
- (Poland) Mateusz Kowalczyk – Stuttgart (draw)
- (New Zealand) Artem Sitak – Stuttgart (draw)
- (Croatia) Marin Draganja – Hamburg (draw)
- (Australia) Samuel Groth – Bogotá (draw)
- (Finland) Henri Kontinen – Kitzbühel (draw)
- (France) Pierre-Hugues Herbert – Tokyo (draw)
- (Poland) Michał Przysiężny – Tokyo (draw)

Mixed doubles
- (Netherlands) Jean-Julien Rojer – French Open (draw)

The following players defended a main circuit title in singles, doubles, or mixed doubles:

Singles
- (Croatia) Marin Čilić – Zagreb (draw)
- (Spain) David Ferrer – Buenos Aires (draw)
- (Japan) Kei Nishikori – Memphis (draw)
- (Spain) Rafael Nadal – Madrid (draw), French Open (draw)
- (Switzerland) Roger Federer – Halle (draw)
- (Spain) Feliciano López – Eastbourne (draw)
- (Serbia) Novak Djokovic – Beijing (draw), Paris (draw), ATP World Tour Finals (draw)

Doubles
- (United States) Bob Bryan – Indian Wells (draw), Cincinnati (draw), Paris (draw)
- (United States) Mike Bryan – Indian Wells (draw), Cincinnati (draw), Paris (draw)
- (Mexico) Santiago González – Oeiras (draw)
- (United States) Scott Lipsky – Oeiras (draw)
- (Romania) Horia Tecău – Bucharest (draw), 's-Hertogenbosch (draw), Beijing (draw)
- (Austria) Alexander Peya – Toronto (draw)
- (Brazil) Bruno Soares – Toronto (draw)

=== Top 10 entry ===
The following players entered the top 10 for the first time in their careers:

Singles
- (Japan) Kei Nishikori (enters at #9 on 12 May)
- (Latvia) Ernests Gulbis (enters at #10 on 9 June)
- (Bulgaria) Grigor Dimitrov (enters at #9 on 7 July)

== ATP rankings ==
These are the ATP rankings of the top 20 singles players, doubles players, and the top 10 doubles teams on the ATP Tour, at the current date of the 2014 season. Players on a gold background have qualified for the Year-End Championships.

=== Singles ===
Race to the finals singles rankings final standings
#	Player	Points	Tours
1	Novak Djokovic (SRB)	10,010	18
2	Roger Federer (SUI)	8,700	19
3	Rafael Nadal (ESP)	6,835	19
4	Stan Wawrinka (SUI)	4,895	19
5	Kei Nishikori (JPN)	4,625	22
6	Andy Murray (GBR)	4,475	22
7	Tomáš Berdych (CZE)	4,465	24
8	Milos Raonic (CAN)	4,440	21
9	Marin Čilić (CRO)	4,150	25
10	David Ferrer (ESP)	4,045	26
11	Grigor Dimitrov (BUL)	3,645	21
12	Jo-Wilfried Tsonga (FRA)	2,740	20
13	Ernests Gulbis (LAT)	2,455	24
14	Feliciano López (ESP)	2,130	27
15	Roberto Bautista Agut (ESP)	2,110	24
16	Kevin Anderson (RSA)	2,080	24
17	Tommy Robredo (ESP)	2,015	26
18	John Isner (USA)	1,890	24
19	Gaël Monfils (FRA)	1,825	20
20	Fabio Fognini (ITA)	1,790	26

Player has qualified for the 2014 ATP World Tour Finals
Player qualified for but did not compete at the 2014 ATP World Tour Finals

Year-end rankings 2014 (29 December 2014)
#	Player	Points	#Trn	'13 Rk	High	Low	'13→'14
1	Novak Djokovic (SRB)	11,360	17	2	1	2	▲1
2	Roger Federer (SUI)	9,775	19	6	2	8	▲4
3	Rafael Nadal (ESP)	6,835	19	1	1	3	▼2
4	Stan Wawrinka (SUI)	5,370	19	8	3	8	▲4
5	Kei Nishikori (JPN)	5,025	22	17	5	21	▲12
6	Andy Murray (GBR)	4,675	22	4	4	12	▼2
7	Tomáš Berdych (CZE)	4,600	24	7	5	7	Steady
8	Milos Raonic (CAN)	4,440	21	11	6	12	▲3
9	Marin Čilić (CRO)	4,150	25	37	8	37	▲28
10	David Ferrer (ESP)	4,045	26	3	3	10	▼7
11	Grigor Dimitrov (BUL)	3,645	21	23	8	23	▲12
12	Jo-Wilfried Tsonga (FRA)	2,740	20	10	10	17	▼2
13	Ernests Gulbis (LAT)	2,455	24	24	10	24	▲11
14	Feliciano López (ESP)	2,130	27	28	14	37	▲14
15	Roberto Bautista Agut (ESP)	2,110	24	58	14	73	▲43
16	Kevin Anderson (RSA)	2,080	24	20	16	22	▲4
17	Tommy Robredo (ESP)	2,015	26	18	14	22	▲1
18	Gaël Monfils (FRA)	1,900	20	31	15	32	▲13
19	John Isner (USA)	1,890	24	14	9	19	▼5
20	Fabio Fognini (ITA)	1,790	26	16	13	21	▼4

==== Number 1 ranking ====
Holder	Date gained	Date forfeited
Rafael Nadal (ESP)	Year-end 2013	6 July 2014
Novak Djokovic (SRB)	7 July 2014	Year-end 2014

=== Doubles ===
ATP doubles team race To London, final rankings
#	Team	Points	Tours
1	Bob Bryan (USA); Mike Bryan (USA)	12,800	23
2	Daniel Nestor (CAN); Nenad Zimonjić (SRB)	6,020	21
3	Julien Benneteau (FRA); Édouard Roger-Vasselin (FRA)	5,140	19
4	Alexander Peya (AUT); Bruno Soares (BRA)	4,870	27
5	Marcel Granollers (ESP); Marc López (ESP)	4,650	19
6	Jean-Julien Rojer (NED); Horia Tecău (ROU)	4,490	30
7	Ivan Dodig (CRO); Marcelo Melo (BRA)	4,370	21
8	Łukasz Kubot (POL); Robert Lindstedt (SWE)	3,680	20
9	Eric Butorac (USA); Raven Klaasen (RSA)	3,385	27
10	Vasek Pospisil (CAN); Jack Sock (USA)	3,030	7

Team competed at the 2014 ATP World Tour Finals

Year-end rankings 2014 (29 December 2014)
#	Player	Points	#Trn	13' Rank	High	Low	'13→'14
1	Bob Bryan (USA)	12,740	22	1T	1T	1T	Steady
1	Mike Bryan (USA)	12,740	22	1T	1T	1T	Steady
3	Nenad Zimonjić (SRB)	6,430	24	14	3	18	▲11
4	Daniel Nestor (CAN)	6,270	26	25	3	25	▲21
5	Julien Benneteau (FRA)	5,350	21	26	5	35	▲21
6	Marcelo Melo (BRA)	5,100	26	6	3	10	Steady
7	Édouard Roger-Vasselin (FRA)	5,050	21	17	6	20	▲10
8	Marcel Granollers (ESP)	4,830	25	12	7	27	▲4
9	Marc López (ESP)	4,650	19	11	9	30	▲2
10	Alexander Peya (AUT)	4,570	27	4	3T	10T	▼6
10	Bruno Soares (BRA)	4,570	27	3	3	10T	▼7
12	Ivan Dodig (CRO)	4,370	22	7	6	16	▼5
13	Robert Lindstedt (SWE)	3,995	27	19	7	20	▲6
14	Vasek Pospisil (CAN)	3,940	22	89	12	100	▲75
15	Jack Sock (USA)	3,825	15	101	13	222	▲86
16	Jean-Julien Rojer (NED)	3,740	30	15T	14T	34	▼1
16	Horia Tecău (ROU)	3,740	29	23	14T	30	▲7
18	Łukasz Kubot (POL)	3,680	20	37	14	41	▲19
19	Nicolas Mahut (FRA)	3,350	21	32	10	32	▲13
20	Eric Butorac (USA)	3,320	28	47	18T	49	▲27
20	Raven Klaasen (RSA)	3,320	28	44	18T	47	▲24

==== Number 1 ranking ====
Holder	Date gained	Date forfeited
Bob Bryan (USA); Mike Bryan (USA)	Year-End 2013	Year-End 2014

== Prize money leaders ==
#	Player	Singles	Doubles	Year-to-date
1	Novak Djokovic (SRB)	$14,250,527	$18,935	$14,269,462
2	Roger Federer (SUI)	$9,343,988	$49,134	$9,393,122
3	Rafael Nadal (ESP)	$6,736,843	$9,630	$6,746,473
4	Stan Wawrinka (SUI)	$5,582,116	$54,559	$5,636,675
5	Marin Cilic (CRO)	$4.879,359	$77,929	$4,957,288
6	Kei Nishikori (JPN)	$4,431,363	$7,855	$4,439,218
7	Tomáš Berdych (CZE)	$3,899,534	$44,534	$3,944,068
8	Andy Murray (GBR)	$3,904,822	$13,420	$3,918,242
9	Milos Raonic (CAN)	$3,534,480	$20,263	$3,554,743
10	David Ferrer (ESP)	$2,809,026	$6,040	$2,815,066
as of November 17, 2014

== Best matches by ATPWorldTour.com ==
=== Best 5 Grand Slam matches ===
	Event	Round	Surface	Winner	Opponent	Result
1.	Wimbledon	F	Grass	(Serbia) Novak Djokovic	(Switzerland) Roger Federer	6–7^{(7–9)}, 6–4, 7–6^{(7–4)}, 5–7, 6–4
2.	Australian Open	QF	Hard	(Switzerland) Stan Wawrinka	(Serbia) Novak Djokovic	2–6, 6–4, 6–2, 3–6, 9–7
3.	US Open	QF	Hard	(Japan) Kei Nishikori	(Switzerland) Stan Wawrinka	3–6, 7–5, 7–6^{(9–7),}, 6–7^{(5–7)}, 6–4
4.	US Open	QF	Hard	(Switzerland) Roger Federer	(France) Gaël Monfils	4–6, 3–6, 6–4, 7–5, 6–2
5.	French Open	R3	Clay	(United Kingdom) Andy Murray	(Germany) Philipp Kohlschreiber	3–6, 6–3, 6–3, 4–6, 12–10

=== Best 5 ATP World Tour matches ===
	Event	Round	Surface	Winner	Opponent	Result
1.	ATP Finals	SF	Hard	(Switzerland) Roger Federer	(Switzerland) Stan Wawrinka	4–6, 7–5, 7–6^{(8–6)}
2.	Madrid Open	SF	Clay	(Japan) Kei Nishikori	(Spain) David Ferrer	7–6^{(7–5)}, 5–7, 6–3
3.	Rio Open	SF	Clay	(Spain) Rafael Nadal	(Spain) Pablo Andújar	2–6, 6–3, 7–6^{(12–10)}
4.	Canadian Open	R2	Hard	(Serbia) Novak Djokovic	(France) Gaël Monfils	6–2, 6–7^{(4–7)}, 7–6^{(7–2)}
5.	Mexican Open	SF	Hard	(Bulgaria) Grigor Dimitrov	(United Kingdom) Andy Murray	4–6, 7–6^{(7–5)}, 7–6^{(7–3)}

== Statistics leaders ==
as of 15 December 2014

Aces
#	Player	Aces	Matches
1	(Croatia) Ivo Karlović	1,185	64
2	(Canada) Milos Raonic	1,107	67
3	(United States) John Isner	989	57
4	(Croatia) Marin Čilić	744	72
5	(South Africa) Kevin Anderson	723	62
6	(Latvia) Ernests Gulbis	650	62
7	(United States) Sam Querrey	646	45
8	(Spain) Feliciano López	638	64
9	(Switzerland) Roger Federer	627	78
10	(Czech Republic) Tomáš Berdych	607	74

Service games won
#	Player	%	Matches
1	(United States) John Isner	93	57
2	(Croatia) Ivo Karlović	93	64
3	(Switzerland) Roger Federer	91	78
4	(Canada) Milos Raonic	90	67
5	(Serbia) Novak Djokovic	88	69
6	(France) Jo-Wilfried Tsonga	87	50
7	(United States) Sam Querrey	87	45
8	(Bulgaria) Grigor Dimitrov	86	67
9	(Spain) Feliciano López	86	64
10	(Czech Republic) Tomáš Berdych	86	74

Break points saved
#	Player	%	Matches
1	(United States) John Isner	75	57
2	(Croatia) Ivo Karlović	72	64
3	(Switzerland) Roger Federer	71	78
4	(France) Jo-Wilfried Tsonga	70	50
5	(South Africa) Kevin Anderson	69	62
6	(Spain) Feliciano López	69	64
7	(United States) Jack Sock	69	47
8	(Canada) Milos Raonic	69	67
9	(France) Édouard Roger-Vasselin	68	49
10	(United States) Sam Querrey	67	45

First serve percentage
#	Player	%	Matches
1	(Spain) Rafael Nadal	70	59
2	(Spain) Roberto Bautista Agut	69	64
3	(United States) John Isner	68	57
4	(Uzbekistan) Denis Istomin	68	51
5	(Croatia) Ivo Karlović	67	64
6	(Serbia) Novak Djokovic	67	69
7	(France) Édouard Roger-Vasselin	67	49
8	(South Africa) Kevin Anderson	66	62
9	(Spain) Fernando Verdasco	66	46
10	(Spain) Pablo Andújar	66	44

First service points won
#	Player	%	Matches
1	(Croatia) Ivo Karlović	84	64
2	(Canada) Milos Raonic	83	67
3	(United States) Sam Querrey	79	45
4	(Croatia) Marin Čilić	79	72
5	(United States) John Isner	79	57
6	(Switzerland) Stan Wawrinka	79	51
7	(Switzerland) Roger Federer	79	78
8	(Czech Republic) Tomáš Berdych	78	74
9	(Latvia) Ernests Gulbis	78	62
10	(Spain) Feliciano López	78	64

Second serve points won
#	Player	%	Matches
1	(Switzerland) Roger Federer	58	78
2	(United States) John Isner	57	57
3	(Serbia) Novak Djokovic	56	69
4	(France) Richard Gasquet	56	47
5	(Germany) Philipp Kohlschreiber	56	61
6	(Spain) Rafael Nadal	55	59
7	(France) Jo-Wilfried Tsonga	54	50
8	(Croatia) Ivo Karlović	54	64
9	(Switzerland) Stan Wawrinka	54	51
10	(United States) Jack Sock	54	47

Points Won Returning 1st Serve
#	Player	%	Matches
1	(Spain) Rafael Nadal	35	59
2	(Spain) David Ferrer	34	78
3	(France) Gaël Monfils	34	47
4	(United Kingdom) Andy Murray	33	75
5	(Serbia) Novak Djokovic	33	69
6	(Spain) Guillermo García López	32	51
7	(Switzerland) Roger Federer	32	78
8	(Spain) Pablo Andújar	32	44
9	(Italy) Fabio Fognini	32	60
10	(Spain) Roberto Bautista Agut	31	64

Points Won Returning 2nd Serve
#	Player	%	Matches
1	(Serbia) Novak Djokovic	58	69
2	(Spain) Rafael Nadal	56	59
3	(Spain) David Ferrer	56	78
4	(United Kingdom) Andy Murray	55	75
5	(Czech Republic) Tomáš Berdych	54	74
6	(Japan) Kei Nishikori	53	66
7	(Spain) Pablo Andújar	53	44
8	(France) Gilles Simon	53	52
9	(Spain) Roberto Bautista Agut	53	64
10	(Finland) Jarkko Nieminen	52	49

Break points converted
#	Player	%	Matches
1	(Spain) Rafael Nadal	48	59
2	(Serbia) Novak Djokovic	45	69
3	(France) Gilles Simon	45	52
4	(United Kingdom) Andy Murray	44	75
5	(Spain) David Ferrer	43	78
6	(Germany) Philipp Kohlschreiber	43	61
7	(Spain) Roberto Bautista Agut	43	64
8	(Italy) Fabio Fognini	43	60
9	(Bulgaria) Grigor Dimitrov	42	67
10	(Colombia) Santiago Giraldo	42	55

Return Games Won
#	Player	%	Matches
1	(Spain) Rafael Nadal	35	59
2	(Serbia) Novak Djokovic	33	69
3	(Spain) David Ferrer	33	78
4	(United Kingdom) Andy Murray	32	75
5	(Spain) Pablo Andújar	29	44
6	(Japan) Kei Nishikori	28	66
7	(Italy) Fabio Fognini	27	60
8	(France) Gaël Monfils	27	47
9	(Spain) Roberto Bautista Agut	26	64
10	(Switzerland) Roger Federer	26	78

== Point distribution ==
Category	W	F	SF	QF	R16	R32	R64	R128	Q	Q3	Q2	Q1
Grand Slam (128S)	2000	1200	720	360	180	90	45	10	25	16	8	0
Grand Slam (64D)	2000	1200	720	360	180	90	0	–	25	–	0	0
ATP World Tour Finals (8S/8D)	1500 (max) 1100 (min)	1000 (max) 600 (min)	600 (max); 200 (min)	200 for each round robin match win, +400 for a semifinal win, +500 for the final win.								
ATP World Tour Masters 1000 (96S)	1000	600	360	180	90	45	25	10	16	–	8	0
ATP World Tour Masters 1000 (56S/48S)	1000	600	360	180	90	45	10	–	25	–	16	0
ATP World Tour Masters 1000 (32D/24D)	1000	600	360	180	90	0	–	–	–	–	–	–
ATP World Tour 500 (48S)	500	300	180	90	45	20	0	–	10	–	4	0
ATP World Tour 500 (32S)	500	300	180	90	45	0	–	–	20	–	10	0
ATP World Tour 500 (16D)	500	300	180	90	0	–	–	–	20	–	0	0
ATP World Tour 250 (56S/48S)	250	150	90	45	20	10	0	–	5	3	0	0
ATP World Tour 250 (32S/28S)	250	150	90	45	20	0	–	–	12	6	0	0
ATP World Tour 250 (24D)	250	150	90	45	20	0	–	–	–	–	–	–
ATP World Tour 250 (16D)	250	150	90	45	0	–	–	–	–	–	–	–

Davis Cup
Rubber category		Match win	Match loss	Team bonus	Performance bonus	Total achievable
Singles	Play-offs	5 / 10^{1}				15
Singles	First round	40	10^{2}			80
Singles	Quarterfinals	65				130
Singles	Semifinals	70				140
Singles	Final	75		75^{3}	125^{4}	150 / 225^{3} / 275^{4}
Singles	Cumulative total	500		500 to 535^{3}	625^{4}	625^{4}
Doubles	Play-offs	10				10
Doubles	First round	50	10^{2}			50
Doubles	Quarterfinals	80				80
Doubles	Semifinals	90				90
Doubles	Final	95		35^{5}		95 / 130^{5}
Doubles	Cumulative total	315		350^{5}		350^{5}

The Davis Cup World Group and World Group Play-Off matches awarded ATP Ranking points from 2009 to 2015.

Glossary

Only live matches earn points; dead rubbers earn no points. If a player does not compete in the singles of one or more rounds he will receive points from the previous round when playing singles at the next tie. This last rule also applies for playing in doubles matches.

^{1} A player who wins a singles rubber in the first day of the tie is awarded 5 points, whereas a singles rubber win in tie's last day grants 10 points for a total of 15 available points.

^{2} For the first round only, any player who competes in a live rubber, without a win, receives 10 ranking points for participation.

^{3} Team bonus awarded to a singles player who wins 7 live matches in a calendar year and his team wins the competition.

^{4} Performance bonus awarded to a singles player who wins 8 live matches in a calendar year. In this case, no Team bonus is awarded.

^{5} Team bonus awarded to an unchanged doubles team who wins 4 matches in a calendar year and his team wins the competition.

== Retirements ==
Following is a list of notable players [winners of a main tour title, and/or part of the ATP rankings top 100 (singles) or top 50 (doubles) for at least one week] who announced their retirement from professional tennis, became inactive (after not playing for more than 52 weeks), or were permanently banned from playing, during the 2014 season:

- Alex Bogomolov Jr. (born 23 April 1983 in Moscow, Russia) turned professional in 2002, and peaked at no. 33 in singles in 2011. He won 1 double title on the main tour. He retires at the age of 31.
- Paul Capdeville (born 2 April 1983 in Santiago, Chile) turned professional in 2002, and peaked at no. 76 in singles in 2009. He won one doubles title. Capdeville was also part of the Chile Davis Cup team for 19 ties between 2004 and 2014. He announced his retirement after Roland Garros.
- (Russia) Nikolay Davydenko (born 2 June 1981 in Severodonetsk, Soviet Union) turned professional in 1999, and peaked at no. 3 in singles in 2006 and no. 31 in doubles in 2005. Davydenko won 21 singles titles on the main tour (including one ATP World Tour Finals and three Master 1000), as well as 2 doubles titles. At Grand Slams, Davydenko reached the semifinal four times (in 2005 and 2007 at the French Open and in 2006 and 2007 at the US Open). His major achievement was winning the 2009 ATP World Tour Finals tournament, beating in the final Juan Martín del Potro. He was also active part of the Russian Davis Cup team for 17 ties between 2003 and 2012, winning the title in 2006 with Marat Safin, Dmitry Tursunov and Mikhail Youzhny. On 16 October, he announced his retirement at the age of 33.
- (South Africa) Rik de Voest (born 5 June 1980 in Milan, Italy) turned professional in 1999, and peaked at no. 39 in doubles in 2009. He won two doubles titles. De Voest was also part of the South African Davis Cup team for 25 ties between 2002 and 2014. He retired after the Vancouver Open in July.
- Alessio di Mauro (born 9 August 1977 in Syracuse, Italy) turned professional in 1998, and peaked at no. 68 in singles in 2007. He reached one singles final in 2007, where he lost to Juan Mónaco. He was involved in a betting scandal that led to a 9-month ban from the tour. Di Mauro also participated in one tie for the Italian Davis Cup team in 2004. He announced his retirement at the end of September.
- (France) Marc Gicquel (born 30 March 1977 in Tunis, Tunisia) turned professional in 1999, and peaked at no. 37 in singles in 2008 and no. 38 in doubles in 2009. He reached three singles finals on the main tour, as well as seven doubles finals (winning four of them). In Grand Slam he reached in singles the 4th round at 2006 US Open and in doubles the quarterfinals at 2008 Australian Open. He announced his retirement after losing in the quarterfinals against Nicolas Mahut at the Rennes tournament.
- Paul Hanley (born 12 November 1977 in Melbourne, Australia, Australia) turned professional in 1997, and peaked at no. 5 in doubles in 2006. Hanley won 26 doubles titles. In Grand Slam doubles, he reached six semifinals – four with Kevin Ullyett and two with fellow countryman Wayne Arthurs. He also was a finalist at 2005 Wimbledon Championships in mixed doubles. He was part of the Australia Davis Cup team for 10 ties between 2006 and 2010.
- (United Kingdom) Ross Hutchins (born 22 February 1985 in Wimbledon, Great Britain) turned professional in 2002, and peaked at no. 26 in doubles in 2012. Hutchins won 5 doubles titles. In Grand Slam he reached the quarterfinals twice (in 2011 in Wimbledon and US Open) in pair with fellow countryman Colin Fleming. He also won a silver medal at the Commonwealth Games in 2010. He was part of the Great Britain Davis Cup team for 7 ties between 2008 and 2012. After being diagnosed with Hodgkin's lymphoma in early 2013, he decided to have a rest from the circuit and returned in mid-2014. He retired at the end of the 2014 ATP World Tour season.
- Evgeny Korolev (born 14 February 1988 in Moscow, Soviet Union) turned professional in 2005, and peaked at no. 46 in singles in 2010. He won 4 titles on the ATP Challenger Tour and reached one singles final on the main tour. He was part of the Kazakhstan Davis Cup team for 7 ties between 2011 and 2014. He played his final match in the 2014 Bauer Watertechnology Cup qualifying event.
- Michaël Llodra (born 18 May 1980 in Paris, France) turned professional in 1999, and peaked at no. 21 in singles in 2011 and no. 3 in doubles in 2011. The Frenchman, appreciated on the tour for his volley strategy, won five singles titles on the main tour, as well as 25 doubles titles (including three Grand Slam titles). Llodra's Grand Slam titles included the 2003 Australian Open and 2004 Australian Open doubles with fellow Frenchman Fabrice Santoro and the 2007 Wimbledon Championships doubles with fellow Frenchman Arnaud Clément. He won the silver medal at the Olympic Games with Jo-Wilfried Tsonga, losing to the world no. 1 pair of Bob and Mike Bryan. He was part of the French Davis Cup team for 27 ties between 2002 and 2013, reaching 2 finals in 2002 and 2010. He announced that he will retire at the end of the 2014 ATP World Tour season.
- Björn Phau (born 4 October 1979 in Darmstadt, West Germany) turned professional in 1999, and peaked at no. 59 in singles in 2006. He won 7 titles on the ATP Challenger Tour and reached one doubles final on the main tour. He played his final match at the 2014 Košice Open.
- (Israel) Andy Ram (born 10 April 1980 in Montevideo, Uruguay) turned professional in 1998, and peaked at no. 187 in singles in 2000 and no. 5 in doubles in 2008. He won 20 doubles titles (including one Grand Slam title). Ram's sole men's doubles Grand Slam title was won at the 2008 Australian Open doubles with fellow Israeli Jonathan Erlich. He also won two mixed Grand Slam titles (making two other finals) at 2006 Wimbledon Championships with Vera Zvonareva and at 2007 French Open with Nathalie Dechy. He was part of the Israeli Davis Cup team for 27 ties between 2000 and 2014. He announced his retirement after the Davis Cup playoff against Argentina.
- (United States) Bobby Reynolds (born July 17, 1982 in Auburn, Alabama, US) turned professional in 2003, and peaked at no. 63 in singles and no. 46 in doubles in 2009. He won one doubles title
- Olivier Rochus (born 18 January 1981 in Namur, Belgium) turned professional in 1999, and peaked at no. 24 in singles in 2005 and no. 29 in doubles in 2004. He won two singles titles on the main tour, as well as two doubles titles (including one Grand Slam title). Rochus' Grand Slam doubles title was won at the 2004 French Open with fellow Belgian Xavier Malisse. He was part of the Belgian Davis Cup team for 28 ties between 2000 and 2013. He retired after competing at the Mons tournament.

== Comebacks ==
Following are notable players who will come back after retirements during the 2014 ATP Tour season:

List of comebacks
- Francisco Roig (born 1 April 1968, in Barcelona, Spain) joined the pro tour in 1987, reached the singles no. 60 spot in 1992, and the doubles no. 23 ranking in 1995. He won nine main circuit titles including one ATP Championship Series (ATP 500) title. He sometimes acts as the alternate coach of fellow Spaniard Rafael Nadal. He decided to come back from inactivity at the 2014 Qatar ExxonMobil Open, where he played doubles alongside Nadal.
- Patrick Rafter (born 28 December 1972, in Mount Isa, Australia) joined the pro tour in 1991, former no. 1 in 1998, and doubles no. 6 in 1999. He won 11 main circuit titles in singles (including two Grand Slam and two Masters Series events). He decided to come back from inactivity at the 2014 Australian Open, playing alongside Lleyton Hewitt.
- (Hungary) Sándor Noszály (born 16 March 1972 in Budapest, Hungary) joined the ATP Challenger Tour in 1989 at the age of 17. In 1995 he reached the quarterfinal of 1995 Austrian Open losing to Thomas Muster and the semifinal of 1995 Romanian Open losing again to the Austrian. Thus he became ranked no. 95 in the world. The same year—maturing from being the youngest member ever (16 ages old) of the Davis Cup team—he pushed Hungary to the World Group for the second time (1993) after beating former champions Australia in the play-off. He returned to international tennis in the Hall of Fame Tennis Championships after a 4-year hiatus.
- Viktor Troicki (born 10 February 1986, in Belgrade, SR Serbia, Yugoslavia) joined the pro tour in 2003, reached the singles no. 12 in 2011, and the doubles no. 49 ranking in 2010. He won one main circuit title in singles and one in doubles. On 25 July 2013, Troicki was banned from playing tennis for 18 months, for failing to provide a blood sample at the Monte-Carlo Masters event. However, the suspension was reduced on appeal to one year, meaning he could play from 15 July 2014. He was allowed to come back from inactivity at the 2014 Crédit Agricole Suisse Open, where he received a wildcard.

== See also ==
- 2014 ATP Challenger Tour
- 2014 ITF Men's Circuit
- 2014 WTA Tour
