= 2014 Bet-at-home Cup Kitzbühel =

- Date: 27 July – 2 August
- Edition: 70th
- Category: World Tour 250 series
- Surface: Clay / outdoor
- Location: Kitzbühel, Austria
- Venue: Tennis stadium Kitzbühel

Champions

Singles
- (Belgium) David Goffin

Doubles
- (Finland) Henri Kontinen / (Finland) Jarkko Nieminen
← 2013 ·	Bet-at-home Cup Kitzbühel	· 2015 →

The 2014 Bet-at-home Cup Kitzbühel was a men's tennis tournament played on outdoor clay courts. It was the 70th edition of the Austrian Open Kitzbühel, and part of the World Tour 250 series of the 2014 ATP World Tour. It took place at the Tennis stadium Kitzbühel in Kitzbuehel Austria, from July 27 through August 2.

== Singles main draw entrants ==
=== Seeds ===
Country	Player	Rank^{1}	Seed
GER	Philipp Kohlschreiber	25	1
ESP	Marcel Granollers	28	2
CZE	Lukáš Rosol	43	3
ITA	Andreas Seppi	45	4
AUT	Dominic Thiem	47	5
NED	Robin Haase	51	6
FIN	Jarkko Nieminen	54	7
ESP	Pablo Carreño Busta	57	8

- ^{1} Rankings are as of July 21, 2014

=== Other entrants ===
The following players received wildcards into the singles main draw:

- (Belgium) David Goffin
- (Austria) Gerald Melzer
- (Germany) Alexander Zverev

The following players received entry from the qualifying draw:

- (Croatia) Viktor Galović
- (Argentina) Máximo González
- (Spain) Albert Ramos-Viñolas
- (Brazil) João Souza

=== Withdrawals ===
Before the tournament

- (Spain) Nicolás Almagro
- (Argentina) Carlos Berlocq
- (Slovakia) Martin Kližan
- (Argentina) Leonardo Mayer
- (Portugal) João Sousa

During the tournament

- (Spain) Pere Riba

== Doubles main draw entrants ==
=== Seeds ===
Country	Player	Country	Player	Rank^{1}	Seed
GBR	Colin Fleming	USA	Scott Lipsky	84	1
AUT	Julian Knowle	AUT	Oliver Marach	87	2
GER	Martin Emmrich	CZE	Lukáš Rosol	112	3
GER	Andre Begemann	NED	Robin Haase	113	4

- Rankings are as of July 21, 2014

=== Other entrants ===
The following pairs received wildcards into the doubles main draw:

- (Austria) Gerald Melzer / (Austria) Jürgen Melzer
- (Austria) Thomas Pichl / (Italy) Andreas Seppi

== Finals ==
=== Singles ===
- (Belgium) David Goffin defeated (Austria) Dominic Thiem, 4–6, 6–1, 6–3

=== Doubles ===
- (Finland) Henri Kontinen / (Finland) Jarkko Nieminen defeated (Italy) Daniele Bracciali / (Kazakhstan) Andrey Golubev, 6–1, 6–4
