= 2014 Royal Guard Open =

- Date: 3–9 February
- Edition: 21st
- Category: ATP World Tour 250 series
- Draw: 28S / 16D
- Prize money: $398,250
- Surface: Clay / outdoor
- Location: Viña del Mar, Chile

Champions

Singles
- (Italy) Fabio Fognini

Doubles
- (Austria) Oliver Marach / (Romania) Florin Mergea
- Chile Open

The 2014 Royal Guard Open was a men's tennis tournament played on clay courts. It was the 21st and last edition of the Royal Guard Open, and part of the ATP World Tour 250 series of the 2014 ATP World Tour. It took place in Viña del Mar, Chile from 3 February through 9 February 2014. First-seeded Fabio Fognini won the singles title.

== Finals ==
=== Singles ===
- (Italy) Fabio Fognini defeated (Argentina) Leonardo Mayer 6–2, 6–4

=== Doubles ===
- (Austria) Oliver Marach / (Romania) Florin Mergea defeated (Colombia) Juan Sebastián Cabal / (Colombia) Robert Farah, 6–3, 6–4

== Singles main-draw entrants ==
=== Seeds ===
Country	Player	Rank^{1}	Seed
ITA	Fabio Fognini	15	1
ESP	Tommy Robredo	16	2
ESP	Nicolás Almagro	17	3
ESP	Marcel Granollers	35	4
FRA	Jérémy Chardy	43	5
UKR	Alexandr Dolgopolov	53	6
ESP	Guillermo García López	56	7
ARG	Federico Delbonis	60	8

- Rankings are as of January 27, 2014.

=== Other entrants ===
The following players received wildcards into the singles main draw:

- (Ukraine) Alexandr Dolgopolov
- (Chile) Christian Garín
- (Chile) Gonzalo Lama

The following players received entry from the qualifying draw:

- (Argentina) Martín Alund
- (Brazil) Thomaz Bellucci
- (Japan) Taro Daniel
- (Spain) Rubén Ramírez Hidalgo

=== Withdrawals ===
Before the tournament

- (Spain) Albert Montañés

== Doubles main-draw entrants ==
=== Seeds ===
Country	Player	Country	Player	Rank^{1}	Seed
ESP	Marcel Granollers	ESP	Marc López	47	1
COL	Juan Sebastián Cabal	COL	Robert Farah	94	2
AUT	Oliver Marach	ROU	Florin Mergea	97	3
URU	Pablo Cuevas	ARG	Horacio Zeballos	97	4

- Rankings are as of January 27, 2014.

=== Other entrants ===
The following pairs received wildcards into the doubles main draw:

- (Chile) Christian Garín / (Chile) Nicolás Jarry
- (Chile) Gonzalo Lama / (Chile) Juan Carlos Sáez
