= 2014 Bet-at-home Cup Kitzbühel – Doubles =

Doubles
- 2014 Bet-at-home Cup Kitzbühel

Final
- Champions: (Finland) Henri Kontinen (Finland) Jarkko Nieminen
- Runners-up: (Italy) Daniele Bracciali (Kazakhstan) Andrey Golubev
- Score: 6–1, 6–4

Details
- Draw: 16
- Seeds: 4

Events
Singles	Doubles
- Bet-at-home Cup Kitzbühel

Martin Emmrich and Christopher Kas were the defending champions, but chose not to participate together. Emmrich played alongside Lukáš Rosol, but lost to Daniele Bracciali and Andrey Golubev in the semifinals. Kas teamed up with Philipp Kohlschreiber, but lost to Henri Kontinen and Jarkko Nieminen in the quarterfinals.
Kontinen and Nieminen won the title, defeating Bracciali and Golubev in the final, 6–1, 6–4.

== Seeds ==
1. (United Kingdom) Colin Fleming / (United States) Scott Lipsky (first round)
2. (Austria) Julian Knowle / (Austria) Oliver Marach (first round)
3. (Germany) Martin Emmrich / (Czech Republic) Lukáš Rosol (semifinals)
4. (Germany) Andre Begemann / (Netherlands) Robin Haase (quarterfinals)

== Draw ==
Key

- Q = Qualifier
- WC = Wild card
- LL = Lucky loser
- Alt = Alternate
- ITF = ITF entry
- PR = Protected ranking
- SR = Special ranking
- SE = Special exempt
- JE = Junior exempt
- JR = Junior Accelerator Programme entrant
- CO = College Accelerator Programme entrant
- NG = Next Gen Accelerator Program entrant
- w/o = Walkover
- r = Retired
- d = Defaulted

=== Draw ===
First round
1	(United Kingdom) C Fleming (United States) S Lipsky	5	2
(Croatia) M Pavić (Brazil) A Sá	7	6
(Sweden) J Brunström (United States) N Monroe	2	4
(Italy) D Bracciali (Kazakhstan) A Golubev	6	6
3	(Germany) M Emmrich (Czech Republic) L Rosol	6	6
WC	(Austria) T Pichl (Italy) A Seppi	2	2
WC	(Austria) G Melzer (Austria) J Melzer	6	2	[10]
(Poland) T Bednarek (Russia) T Gabashvili	4	6	[4]
(Czech Republic) L Dlouhý (United Kingdom) J Marray	7	2	[11]
(Australia) R Junaid (New Zealand) M Venus	5	6	[9]
(Spain) P Andújar (Spain) P Carreño Busta	6	5	[7]
4	(Germany) A Begemann (Netherlands) R Haase	4	7	[10]
(Czech Republic) F Čermák (Austria) P Oswald	1	4
(Germany) C Kas (Germany) P Kohlschreiber	6	6
(Finland) H Kontinen (Finland) J Nieminen	6	0	[10]
2	(Austria) J Knowle (Austria) O Marach	2	6	[4]

Quarterfinals
(Croatia) M Pavić (Brazil) A Sá	3	6	[7]
(Italy) D Bracciali (Kazakhstan) A Golubev	6	3	[10]
3	(Germany) M Emmrich (Czech Republic) L Rosol	6	6
WC	(Austria) G Melzer (Austria) J Melzer	4	3
(Czech Republic) L Dlouhý (United Kingdom) J Marray	6	3	[10]
4	(Germany) A Begemann (Netherlands) R Haase	2	6	[7]
(Germany) C Kas (Germany) P Kohlschreiber	5	6	[6]
(Finland) H Kontinen (Finland) J Nieminen	7	2	[10]

Semifinals
(Italy) D Bracciali (Kazakhstan) A Golubev	6	2	[10]
3	(Germany) M Emmrich (Czech Republic) L Rosol	3	6	[4]
(Czech Republic) L Dlouhý (United Kingdom) J Marray	6	6^{4}	[7]
(Finland) H Kontinen (Finland) J Nieminen	3	7^{7}	[10]

Final
(Italy) D Bracciali (Kazakhstan) A Golubev	1	4
(Finland) H Kontinen (Finland) J Nieminen	6	6
