= 2014 Royal Guard Open – Singles =

Singles
- 2014 Royal Guard Open

Final
- Champion: (Italy) Fabio Fognini
- Runner-up: (Argentina) Leonardo Mayer
- Score: 6–2, 6-4

Details
- Draw: 28
- Seeds: 8

Events
Singles	Doubles
- Royal Guard Open

Horacio Zeballos was the defending champion, but lost in the second round to Daniel Gimeno Traver.
Fabio Fognini won the title, defeating Leonardo Mayer in the final 6–2, 6–4.

== Seeds ==
The top four seeds receive a bye into the second round.

1. (Italy) Fabio Fognini (champion)
2. (Spain) Tommy Robredo (second round)
3. (Spain) Nicolás Almagro (semifinals)
4. (Spain) Marcel Granollers (second round)

5. (France) Jérémy Chardy (quarterfinals)
6. (Ukraine) Alexandr Dolgopolov (first round)
7. (Spain) Guillermo García López (quarterfinals)
8. (Argentina) Federico Delbonis (second round)

== Draw ==
Key

- Q = Qualifier
- WC = Wild card
- LL = Lucky loser
- Alt = Alternate
- ITF = ITF entry
- PR = Protected ranking
- SR = Special ranking
- SE = Special exempt
- JE = Junior exempt
- JR = Junior Accelerator Programme entrant
- CO = College Accelerator Programme entrant
- NG = Next Gen Accelerator Program entrant
- w/o = Walkover
- r = Retired
- d = Defaulted

=== Finals ===
Semifinals
1	(Italy) Fabio Fognini	6	1	7^{7}
3	(Spain) Nicolás Almagro	4	6	6^{5}
(Colombia) Santiago Giraldo	6^{2}	3
(Argentina) Leonardo Mayer	7^{7}	6

Final
1	(Italy) Fabio Fognini	6	6
(Argentina) Leonardo Mayer	2	4

=== Top half ===
First round
(Slovenia) A Bedene	2	6	6
(France) S Robert	6	3	3
(Italy) F Volandri	0	6	1
(Spain) P Carreño Busta	6	3	6
WC	(Chile) C Garín	5	0
5	(France) J Chardy	7	6
Q	(Argentina) M Alund	6	6
(Spain) A Ramos	3	4
Q	(Japan) T Daniel	6	6
Q	(Brazil) T Bellucci	3	3
PR	(Uruguay) P Cuevas	3	4
8	(Argentina) F Delbonis	6	6

Second round
1	(Italy) F Fognini	6	7^{7}
(Slovenia) A Bedene	4	6^{0}
(Spain) P Carreño Busta	3	6^{5}
5	(France) J Chardy	6	7^{7}
3	(Spain) N Almagro	4	6	6
Q	(Argentina) M Alund	6	3	4
Q	(Japan) T Daniel	1	7^{7}	7^{9}
8	(Argentina) F Delbonis	6	6^{5}	6^{7}

Quarterfinals
1	(Italy) F Fognini	6	3	6
5	(France) J Chardy	4	6	2
3	(Spain) N Almagro	6	7
Q	(Japan) T Daniel	2	5

Semifinals
1	(Italy) F Fognini	6	1	7^{7}
3	(Spain) N Almagro	4	6	6^{5}

=== Bottom half ===
First round
7	(Spain) G García López	3	6	6
(Germany) J Reister	6	4	4
(Italy) P Lorenzi	6	6
(Colombia) A González	2	1
(Colombia) S Giraldo	6	6
Q	(Spain) R Ramírez Hidalgo	4	2
6/WC	(Ukraine) A Dolgopolov	6^{4}	6	5
(Spain) D Gimeno Traver	7^{7}	3	7
(Argentina) H Zeballos	6	6
WC	(Chile) G Lama	3	3
(Austria) A Haider-Maurer	5	5
(Argentina) L Mayer	7	7

Second round
7	(Spain) G García López	3	7	6
(Italy) P Lorenzi	6	5	4
(Colombia) S Giraldo	7^{9}	7^{7}
4	(Spain) M Granollers	6^{7}	6^{2}
(Spain) D Gimeno Traver	6	6
(Argentina) H Zeballos	2	4
(Argentina) L Mayer	3	7^{10}	6
2	(Spain) T Robredo	6	6^{8}	4

Quarterfinals
7	(Spain) G García López	6	4	2
(Colombia) S Giraldo	3	6	6
(Spain) D Gimeno Traver	6	5	3
(Argentina) L Mayer	3	7	6

Semifinals
(Colombia) S Giraldo	6^{2}	3
(Argentina) L Mayer	7^{7}	6

== Qualifying ==
=== Seeds ===
The top four seeds receive a bye into the second round.

1. (Argentina) Guido Pella (qualifying competition)
2. (Argentina) Facundo Argüello (qualifying competition)
3. (Brazil) Thomaz Bellucci (qualified)
4. (Argentina) Diego Sebastián Schwartzman (second round)
5. (Brazil) João Souza (qualifying competition)
6. (Spain) Pere Riba (second round)
7. (Argentina) Facundo Bagnis (qualifying competition)
8. (Argentina) Martín Alund (qualified)

=== Qualifiers ===
1. (Argentina) Martín Alund
2. (Japan) Taro Daniel
3. (Brazil) Thomaz Bellucci
4. (Spain) Rubén Ramírez Hidalgo

=== Qualifying draw ===
==== First qualifier ====
First round
(Chile) Bastián Malla	6	6
WC	(Chile) Felipe Garcés	0	2
(Chile) Matías Sborowitz	6	6
(Czech Republic) Lukáš Dlouhý	3	1
(Chile) David Fleming	1	0
8	(Argentina) Martín Alund	6	6

Second round
1	(Argentina) Guido Pella	6	6
(Chile) Bastián Malla	3	1
(Chile) Matías Sborowitz	2	0
8	(Argentina) Martín Alund	6	6

Qualifying competition
1	(Argentina) Guido Pella	6^{4}	6	3
8	(Argentina) Martín Alund	7^{7}	3	6

==== Second qualifier ====
First round
(Italy) Potito Starace	6	6
(Italy) Alessandro Giannessi	3	2
(Austria) Gerald Melzer	4	2
(Japan) Taro Daniel	6	6
(Chile) Juan Carlos Sáez	3	4
6	(Spain) Pere Riba	6	6

Second round
2	(Argentina) Facundo Argüello	6	1	6
(Italy) Potito Starace	4	6	1
(Japan) Taro Daniel	7	6
6	(Spain) Pere Riba	5	1

Qualifying competition
2	(Argentina) Facundo Argüello	6	4	4
(Japan) Taro Daniel	4	6	6

==== Third qualifier ====
First round
(Argentina) Marco Trungelliti	7	4	1
(Argentina) Guido Andreozzi	5	6	6
(Chile) Joao Riquelme	4	2
(Germany) Christopher Kas	6	6
(Chile) Diego Vives	0	2
7	(Argentina) Facundo Bagnis	6	6

Second round
3	(Brazil) Thomaz Bellucci	7^{8}	6
(Argentina) Guido Andreozzi	6^{6}	2
(Germany) Christopher Kas
7	(Argentina) Facundo Bagnis	w/o

Qualifying competition
3	(Brazil) Thomaz Bellucci	6	6^{4}	6
7	(Argentina) Facundo Bagnis	4	7^{7}	3

==== Fourth qualifier ====
First round
WC	(Chile) Myrohn Miranda	1	0
(Spain) Rubén Ramírez Hidalgo	6	6
(Argentina) Renzo Olivo	6	6
(Austria) Philipp Oswald	4	2
(Austria) Pascal Brunner	6^{2}	1
5	(Brazil) João Souza	7^{7}	6

Second round
4	(Argentina) Diego Schwartzman	6^{4}	6	2
(Spain) Rubén Ramírez Hidalgo	7^{7}	1	6
(Argentina) Renzo Olivo	4	0
5	(Brazil) João Souza	6	6

Qualifying competition
(Spain) Rubén Ramírez Hidalgo	6	6
5	(Brazil) João Souza	2	2
