= 2014 Bet-at-home Cup Kitzbühel – Singles =

Singles
- 2014 Bet-at-home Cup Kitzbühel

Final
- Champion: (Belgium) David Goffin
- Runner-up: (Austria) Dominic Thiem
- Score: 4–6, 6–1, 6–3

Details
- Draw: 28
- Seeds: 8

Events
| Singles | Doubles |
- Bet-at-home Cup Kitzbühel

Marcel Granollers was the defending champion, but lost in the quarterfinals to Dominic Thiem.
Unseeded David Goffin won the title, defeating Thiem in the final, 4–6, 6–1, 6–3.

== Seeds ==
The top four seeds receive a bye into the second round.

1. (Germany) Philipp Kohlschreiber (second round)
2. (Spain) Marcel Granollers (quarterfinals)
3. (Czech Republic) Lukáš Rosol (quarterfinals)
4. (Italy) Andreas Seppi (quarterfinals)
5. (Austria) Dominic Thiem (final)
6. (Netherlands) Robin Haase (first round)
7. (Finland) Jarkko Nieminen (second round)
8. (Spain) Pablo Carreño Busta (first round)

== Draw ==
Key

- Q = Qualifier
- WC = Wild card
- LL = Lucky loser
- Alt = Alternate
- ITF = ITF entry
- PR = Protected ranking
- SR = Special ranking
- SE = Special exempt
- JE = Junior exempt
- JR = Junior Accelerator Programme entrant
- CO = College Accelerator Programme entrant
- NG = Next Gen Accelerator Program entrant
- w/o = Walkover
- r = Retired
- d = Defaulted

=== Finals ===
Semifinals
WC | (Belgium) David Goffin | 5 | 6 | 6
Q | (Argentina) Máximo González | 7 | 4 | 3
(Argentina) Juan Mónaco | 3 | 1
5 | (Austria) Dominic Thiem | 6 | 6

Final
WC | (Belgium) David Goffin | 4 | 6 | 6
5 | (Austria) Dominic Thiem | 6 | 1 | 3

=== Top half ===
First round
WC | (Belgium) D Goffin | 6 | 6
(France) K de Schepper | 2 | 4
(Austria) J Melzer | 3 | 4
(Spain) P Andújar | 6 | 6
(Italy) P Lorenzi | 6 | 6
6 | (Netherlands) R Haase | 2 | 3
WC | (Austria) G Melzer | 2 | 6^{1}
(Austria) A Haider-Maurer | 6 | 7^{7}
Q | (Spain) A Ramos Viñolas | 6^{5} | 7 | 6
Q | (Croatia) V Galović | 7^{7} | 5 | 2
Q | (Argentina) M González | 6 | 4 | 7
8 | (Spain) P Carreño Busta | 3 | 6 | 5

Second round
1 | (Germany) P Kohlschreiber | 3 | 5
WC | (Belgium) D Goffin | 6 | 7
(Spain) P Andújar | 2 | 0
(Italy) P Lorenzi | 6 | 6
3 | (Czech Republic) L Rosol | 6 | 7^{7}
(Austria) A Haider-Maurer | 3 | 6^{4}
Q | (Spain) A Ramos Viñolas | 4 | 4
Q | (Argentina) M González | 6 | 6

Quarterfinals
WC | (Belgium) D Goffin | 6 | 6
(Italy) P Lorenzi | 2 | 1
3 | (Czech Republic) L Rosol | 3 | 6 | 3
Q | (Argentina) M González | 6 | 4 | 6

Semifinals
WC | (Belgium) D Goffin | 5 | 6 | 6
Q | (Argentina) M González | 7 | 4 | 3

=== Bottom half ===
First round
7 | (Finland) J Nieminen | 6 | 6
(Russia) T Gabashvili | 4 | 4
(Kazakhstan) A Golubev | 6 | 2 | 1
(Argentina) J Mónaco | 0 | 6 | 6
(Germany) D Brown | 6^{6} | 5
(Spain) P Riba | 7^{8} | 7
5 | (Austria) D Thiem | 7^{7} | 3 | 7
Q | (Brazil) J Souza | 6^{4} | 6 | 5
(Germany) J-L Struff | 4 | 4
(Czech Republic) J Veselý | 6 | 6
WC | (Germany) A Zverev | 1 | 0
(Argentina) D Schwartzman | 6 | 6

Second round
7 | (Finland) J Nieminen | 3 | 4
(Argentina) J Mónaco | 6 | 6
(Spain) P Riba
4 | (Italy) A Seppi | w/o
5 | (Austria) D Thiem | 6 | 7^{7}
(Czech Republic) J Veselý | 3 | 6^{3}
(Argentina) D Schwartzman | 3 | 4
2 | (Spain) M Granollers | 6 | 6

Quarterfinals
(Argentina) J Mónaco | 6 | 3 | 6
4 | (Italy) A Seppi | 2 | 6 | 3
5 | (Austria) D Thiem | 6 | 7
2 | (Spain) M Granollers | 4 | 5

Semifinals
(Argentina) J Mónaco | 3 | 1
5 | (Austria) D Thiem | 6 | 6

== Qualifying ==
=== Seeds ===
1. (Spain) Albert Ramos Viñolas (qualified)
2. (Argentina) Máximo González (qualified)
3. (Brazil) João Souza (qualified)
4. (Spain) Albert Montañés (first round)
5. (Italy) Marco Cecchinato (first round)
6. (Croatia) Mate Delić (first round)
7. (Argentina) Renzo Olivo (first round, retired)
8. (Australia) Alex Bolt (second round)

=== Qualifiers ===
1. (Spain) Albert Ramos Viñolas
2. (Argentina) Máximo González
3. (Brazil) João Souza
4. (Croatia) Viktor Galović

=== Qualifying draw ===
==== First qualifier ====
First round
1 | (Spain) Albert Ramos Viñolas | 7 | 6
(Croatia) Dino Marcan | 5 | 3
(Austria) Maximilian Neuchrist | 6 | 6^{2} | 6
WC | (Austria) Matthias Haim | 3 | 7^{7} | 1
(Slovakia) Jozef Kovalík | 6 | 6
(Israel) Dekel Bar | 2 | 0
(Italy) Riccardo Bellotti | 3 | 6^{7}
8 | (Australia) Alex Bolt | 6 | 7^{9}

Second round
1 | (Spain) Albert Ramos Viñolas | 6 | 6
(Austria) Maximilian Neuchrist | 0 | 4
(Slovakia) Jozef Kovalík | 7 | 6
8 | (Australia) Alex Bolt | 5 | 3

Qualifying competition
1 | (Spain) Albert Ramos Viñolas | 6 | 6
(Slovakia) Jozef Kovalík | 4 | 4

==== Second qualifier ====
First round
2 | (Argentina) Máximo González | 7^{9} | 6
(Austria) Bastian Trinker | 6^{7} | 1
(Brazil) Wilson Leite | 1 | 6 | 2
(Croatia) Mate Pavić | 6 | 4 | 6
WC | (Austria) Alexander Erler | 1 | 4
(Switzerland) Henri Laaksonen | 6 | 6
(Brazil) André Ghem | 6^{7} | 6 | 1
7 | (Argentina) Renzo Olivo | 7^{9} | 3 | 0^{r}

Second round
2 | (Argentina) Máximo González | 6 | 6
(Croatia) Mate Pavić | 3 | 2
(Switzerland) Henri Laaksonen | 3 | 0
(Brazil) André Ghem | 6 | 6

Qualifying competition
2 | (Argentina) Máximo González | 6 | 3 | 6
(Brazil) André Ghem | 4 | 6 | 3

==== Third qualifier ====
First round
3 | (Brazil) João Souza | 7 | 6
(Italy) Gianluigi Quinzi | 5 | 4
(Bosnia and Herzegovina) Tomislav Brkić | 6 | 6
(Bulgaria) Alexandar Lazov | 4 | 3
(Russia) Aslan Karatsev | 7^{8} | 6
WC | (Austria) Philipp Oswald | 6^{6} | 3
(Germany) Mats Moraing | 6 | 6
6 | (Croatia) Mate Delić | 2 | 2

Second round
3 | (Brazil) João Souza | 6 | 6
(Bosnia and Herzegovina) Tomislav Brkić | 4 | 2
(Russia) Aslan Karatsev | 7^{8} | 7
(Germany) Mats Moraing | 6^{6} | 5

Qualifying competition
3 | (Brazil) João Souza | 7^{7} | 2 | 6
(Russia) Aslan Karatsev | 6^{5} | 6 | 4

==== Fourth qualifier ====
First round
4 | (Spain) Albert Montañés | 5 | 4
(Croatia) Antonio Veić | 7 | 6
(Portugal) Frederico Gil | 6 | 7^{7}
(Croatia) Duje Kekez | 4 | 6^{1}
(Russia) Philipp Davydenko | 3 | 4
(Croatia) Viktor Galović | 6 | 6
WC | (Czech Republic) Lukáš Dlouhý | 7 | 6^{3} | 6
5 | (Italy) Marco Cecchinato | 5 | 7^{7} | 1

Second round
(Croatia) Antonio Veić | 3 | 6 | 6
(Portugal) Frederico Gil | 6 | 0 | 0
(Croatia) Viktor Galović | 7 | 6
WC | (Czech Republic) Lukáš Dlouhý | 5 | 1

Qualifying competition
(Croatia) Antonio Veić | 5 | 3
(Croatia) Viktor Galović | 7 | 6
