= 2014 Barcelona Open Banc Sabadell – Doubles =

Doubles
- 2014 Barcelona Open Banc Sabadell

Final
- Champions: (Netherlands) Jesse Huta Galung (France) Stéphane Robert
- Runners-up: (Canada) Daniel Nestor (Serbia) Nenad Zimonjić
- Score: 6–3, 6–3

Events
Singles	Doubles
← 2013 ·	Barcelona Open Banc Sabadell	· 2015 →

Alexander Peya and Bruno Soares were the defending champions, but lost in the first round to Fabio Fognini and Jürgen Melzer. Jesse Huta Galung and Stéphane Robert won the tournament, defeating Daniel Nestor and Nenad Zimonjić in the final, 6–3, 6–3.

== Seeds ==
1. (United States) Bob Bryan / (United States) Mike Bryan (withdrew)
2. (Austria) Alexander Peya / (Brazil) Bruno Soares (first round)
3. (Croatia) Ivan Dodig / (Brazil) Marcelo Melo (semifinals)
4. (Spain) David Marrero / (Spain) Fernando Verdasco (first round)
5. (Canada) Daniel Nestor / (Serbia) Nenad Zimonjić (final)

== Draw ==
=== Key ===
- Q = Qualifier
- WC = Wild card
- LL = Lucky loser
- Alt = Alternate
- SE = Special exempt
- PR = Protected ranking
- ITF = ITF entry
- JE = Junior exempt
- w/o = Walkover
- r = Retired
- d = Defaulted
- SR = Special ranking

=== Draw ===
First round
5	(Canada) D Nestor (Serbia) N Zimonjić	6^{3}	7^{7}	[10]
(Colombia) JS Cabal (Colombia) R Farah	7^{7}	6^{5}	[8]
(India) R Bopanna (Pakistan) A-u-H Qureshi	6	6
(Philippines) T Huey (United Kingdom) D Inglot	1	4
3	(Croatia) I Dodig (Brazil) M Melo	6	4	[16]
(Spain) F López (Belarus) M Mirnyi	4	6	[14]
(Spain) M Granollers (Spain) M López	1^{r}
(Poland) Ł Kubot (Sweden) R Lindstedt	1
LL	(India) S Devvarman (Croatia) A Pavić	6	6
WC	(Spain) R Bautista-Agut (Spain) A Montañés	4	4
LL	(Netherlands) J Huta Galung (France) S Robert	6	6
4	(Spain) D Marrero (Spain) F Verdasco	1	4
WC	(Spain) P Carreño Busta (Spain) A Ramos	5	5
Q	(Russia) T Gabashvili (Kazakhstan) M Kukushkin	7	7
PR	(Italy) F Fognini (Austria) J Melzer	4	6	[10]
2	(Austria) A Peya (Brazil) B Soares	6	4	[8]

Quarterfinals
5	(Canada) D Nestor (Serbia) N Zimonjić	6^{7}	7	[10]
(India) R Bopanna (Pakistan) A-u-H Qureshi	7^{9}	5	[7]
3	(Croatia) I Dodig (Brazil) M Melo	2	6	[10]
(Poland) Ł Kubot (Sweden) R Lindstedt	6	3	[7]
LL	(India) S Devvarman (Croatia) A Pavić	6	3	[5]
LL	(Netherlands) J Huta Galung (France) S Robert	4	6	[10]
Q	(Russia) T Gabashvili (Kazakhstan) M Kukushkin	3	2
PR	(Italy) F Fognini (Austria) J Melzer	6	6

Semifinals
5	(Canada) D Nestor (Serbia) N Zimonjić	6	6
3	(Croatia) I Dodig (Brazil) M Melo	4	4
LL	(Netherlands) J Huta Galung (France) S Robert	6	6
PR	(Italy) F Fognini (Austria) J Melzer	2	0

Final
5	(Canada) D Nestor (Serbia) N Zimonjić	3	3
LL	(Netherlands) J Huta Galung (France) S Robert	6	6

== Qualifying ==
=== Seeds ===
1. (Netherlands) Jesse Huta Galung / (France) Stéphane Robert (qualifying competition, lucky losers)
2. (India) Somdev Devvarman / (Croatia) Ante Pavić (first round, lucky losers)

=== Qualifiers ===
1. (Russia) Teymuraz Gabashvili / (Kazakhstan) Mikhail Kukushkin

=== Lucky losers ===
1. (Netherlands) Jesse Huta Galung / (France) Stéphane Robert
2. (India) Somdev Devvarman / (Croatia) Ante Pavić

=== Qualifying draw ===
First round
1	(Netherlands) Jesse Huta Galung (France) Stéphane Robert	6	6
(Italy) Flavio Cipolla (Australia) Marinko Matosevic	3	2
(Russia) Teymuraz Gabashvili (Kazakhstan) Mikhail Kukushkin	6	6
2	(India) Somdev Devvarman (Croatia) Ante Pavić	2	3

Qualifying competition
1	(Netherlands) Jesse Huta Galung (France) Stéphane Robert	4	6	[9]
(Russia) Teymuraz Gabashvili (Kazakhstan) Mikhail Kukushkin	6	3	[11]
