= 2014 Royal Guard Open – Doubles =

Doubles
- 2014 Royal Guard Open

Final
- Champions: (Austria) Oliver Marach (Romania) Florin Mergea
- Runners-up: (Colombia) Juan Sebastián Cabal (Colombia) Robert Farah
- Score: 6–3, 6–4

Events
| Singles | Doubles |
- Royal Guard Open

Paolo Lorenzi and Potito Starace were the defending champions, but decided not to participate together. Lorenzi played alongside Filippo Volandri, but lost in the quarterfinals to Oliver Marach and Florin Mergea. Starace teamed up with Daniele Bracciali, but lost in the quarterfinals to Marcel Granollers and Marc López.
Marach and Mergea won the title, defeating Juan Sebastián Cabal and Robert Farah in the final, 6–3, 6–4.

== Seeds ==
1. (Spain) Marcel Granollers / (Spain) Marc López (semifinals)
2. (Colombia) Juan Sebastián Cabal / (Colombia) Robert Farah (final)
3. (Austria) Oliver Marach / (Romania) Florin Mergea (champions)
4. (Uruguay) Pablo Cuevas / (Argentina) Horacio Zeballos (first round)

== Draw ==
Key

- Q = Qualifier
- WC = Wild card
- LL = Lucky loser
- Alt = Alternate
- ITF = ITF entry
- PR = Protected ranking
- SR = Special ranking
- SE = Special exempt
- JE = Junior exempt
- JR = Junior Accelerator Programme entrant
- CO = College Accelerator Programme entrant
- NG = Next Gen Accelerator Program entrant
- w/o = Walkover
- r = Retired
- d = Defaulted

First round
1 | (Spain) M Granollers (Spain) M López | 6 | 6
(Spain) G García-López (Austria) P Oswald | 1 | 3
(Italy) D Bracciali (Italy) P Starace | 6 | 3 | [10]
WC | (Chile) G Lama (Chile) JC Sáez | 0 | 6 | [6]
3 | (Austria) O Marach (Romania) F Mergea | 7 | 5 | [11]
(Colombia) S Giraldo (Colombia) A González | 5 | 7 | [9]
(Italy) P Lorenzi (Italy) F Volandri | 7^{7} | 4 | [10]
(Argentina) F Delbonis (Argentina) L Mayer | 6^{5} | 6 | [6]
(United States) N Monroe (Germany) S Stadler | 6 | 2 | [7]
(Spain) D Gimeno-Traver (France) S Robert | 2 | 6 | [10]
(France) J Chardy (Czech Republic) L Dlouhý | 7^{7} | 6
4 | (Uruguay) P Cuevas (Argentina) H Zeballos | 6^{5} | 2
WC | (Chile) C Garín (Chile) N Jarry | 6 | 6
(Germany) C Kas (Brazil) A Sá | 2 | 4
(Spain) P Carreño Busta (Spain) A Ramos | 4 | 4
2 | (Colombia) JS Cabal (Colombia) R Farah | 6 | 6

Quarterfinals
1 | (Spain) M Granollers (Spain) M López | 6 | 6
(Italy) D Bracciali (Italy) P Starace | 4 | 4
3 | (Austria) O Marach (Romania) F Mergea | 2 | 6 | [10]
(Italy) P Lorenzi (Italy) F Volandri | 6 | 3 | [7]
(Spain) D Gimeno-Traver (France) S Robert | 3 | 3
(France) J Chardy (Czech Republic) L Dlouhý | 6 | 6
WC | (Chile) C Garín (Chile) N Jarry | 6 | 3 | [8]
2 | (Colombia) JS Cabal (Colombia) R Farah | 4 | 6 | [10]

Semifinals
1 | (Spain) M Granollers (Spain) M López | 7^{7} | 1 | [7]
3 | (Austria) O Marach (Romania) F Mergea | 6^{2} | 6 | [10]
(France) J Chardy (Czech Republic) L Dlouhý | 2 | 2
2 | (Colombia) JS Cabal (Colombia) R Farah | 6 | 6

Final
3 | (Austria) O Marach (Romania) F Mergea | 6 | 6
2 | (Colombia) JS Cabal (Colombia) R Farah | 3 | 4
