= Fernando Verdasco career statistics =

Career finals
Discipline	Type	Won	Lost	Total	WR
Singles	Grand Slam	–	–	–	–
Singles	ATP Finals	–	–	–	–
Singles	ATP 1000*	–	1	1	0.00
Singles	ATP 500	1	4	5	0.20
Singles	ATP 250	6	10	16	0.38
Singles	Olympics	–	–	–	–
Singles	Total	7	15	22	0.32
Doubles	Grand Slam	–	–	–	–
Doubles	ATP Finals	1	–	1	1.00
Doubles	ATP 1000*	–	1	1	0.00
Doubles	ATP 500	2	2	4	0.50
Doubles	ATP 250	4	2	6	0.67
Doubles	Olympics	–	–	–	–
Doubles	Total	7	5	12	0.58
1) WR = Winning Rate 2) * formerly known as "Super 9" (1996–1999), "Tennis Masters Series" (2000–2003) or "ATP Masters Series" (2004–2008).

This is a list of the main career statistics of Spanish professional tennis player, Fernando Verdasco.

== Career milestones ==
To date, Verdasco has won seven ATP singles titles, with his biggest title coming at the 2010 Barcelona Open Banco Sabadell. Other highlights of Verdasco's career include reaching the final of the 2010 Monte-Carlo Rolex Masters (defeating Novak Djokovic along the way); the semi-finals of the 2009 Australian Open (defeating then World No. 4 Andy Murray in the fourth round before losing to then World No. 1 and eventual champion Rafael Nadal in the longest match in Australian Open history at the time) and 2010 Internazionali BNL d'Italia and the quarterfinals of the US Open in 2009 and 2010 as well as Wimbledon in 2013.

Verdasco is also a successful doubles player, winning eight ATP doubles titles including one year-end championship at the 2013 ATP World Tour Finals with David Marrero, and reaching six grand slam doubles quarterfinals at the Australian Open, French Open and US Open between 2004 and 2014. He was also part of the Spanish teams which won the Davis Cup in 2008, 2009 and 2011 and the Hopman Cup in 2013. Verdasco achieved career high singles and doubles rankings of World No. 7 and World No. 8 on April 20, 2009 and November 11, 2013.

== Significant finals ==
=== Year-end championships finals ===
==== Doubles: 1 (1 title) ====
Outcome	Year	Championship	Surface	Partner	Opponents	Score
Win	2013	ATP Finals	Hard (i)	(Spain) David Marrero	(United States) Bob Bryan (United States) Mike Bryan	7–5, 6–7^{(3–7)}, [10–7]

=== ATP 1000 finals ===
==== Singles: 1 (1 runner-up) ====
Outcome	Year	Championship	Surface	Opponent	Score
Loss	2010	Monte-Carlo Masters	Clay	(Spain) Rafael Nadal	0–6, 1–6

==== Doubles: 1 (1 runner-up) ====
Outcome	Year	Championship	Surface	Partner	Opponents	Score
Loss	2013	Shanghai Masters	Hard	(Spain) David Marrero	(Croatia) Ivan Dodig (Brazil) Marcelo Melo	6–7^{(2–7)}, 7–6^{(8–6)}, [2–10]

== ATP career finals ==
=== Singles: 23 (7 titles, 16 runner-ups) ===
Legend Grand Slam tournaments (0–0) ATP World Tour Finals (0–0) ATP World Tour Masters 1000 (0–1) ATP World Tour 500 Series (1–5) ATP World Tour 250 Series (6–10)	Titles by surface Hard (2–5) Clay (5–10) Grass (0–1)	Titles by setting Outdoor (6–13) Indoor (1–3)

Result	W–L	Date	Tournament	Tier	Surface	Opponent	Score
Loss	0–1	Mar 2004	Mexican Open, Mexico	Intl. Gold	Clay	(Spain) Carlos Moyá	3–6, 0–6
Win	1–1	Apr 2004	Valencia Open, Spain	International	Clay	(Spain) Albert Montañés	7–6^{(7–5)}, 6–3
Loss	1–2	Jul 2005	Austrian Open, Austria	Intl. Gold	Clay	(Argentina) Gastón Gaudio	6–2, 2–6, 4–6, 4–6
Loss	1–3	Oct 2007	St. Petersburg Open, Russia	International	Hard (i)	(United Kingdom) Andy Murray	2–6, 3–6
Loss	1–4	Jun 2008	Nottingham Open, UK	International	Grass (Note: The final itself was played on indoor hard due to rain.)	(Croatia) Ivo Karlović	5–7, 7–6^{(7–4)}, 6–7^{(8–10)}
Win	2–4	Jul 2008	Croatia Open, Croatia	International	Clay	(Russia) Igor Andreev	3–6, 6–4, 7–6^{(7–4)}
Loss	2–5	Jan 2009	Brisbane International, Australia	250 Series	Hard	(Czech Republic) Radek Štěpánek	6–3, 3–6, 4–6
Win	3–5	Aug 2009	Connecticut Open, US	250 Series	Hard	(United States) Sam Querrey	6–4, 7–6^{(8–6)}
Loss	3–6	Oct 2009	Malaysian Open, Malaysia	250 Series	Hard (i)	(Russia) Nikolay Davydenko	4–6, 5–7
Win	4–6	Feb 2010	Pacific Coast Championships, US	250 Series	Hard (i)	(United States) Andy Roddick	3–6, 6–4, 6–4
Loss	4–7	Apr 2010	Monte-Carlo Masters, Monaco	Masters 1000	Clay	(Spain) Rafael Nadal	0–6, 1–6
Win	5–7	Apr 2010	Barcelona Open, Spain	500 Series	Clay	(Sweden) Robin Söderling	6–3, 4–6, 6–3
Loss	5–8	May 2010	Open de Nice Côte d'Azur, France	250 Series	Clay	(France) Richard Gasquet	3–6, 7–5, 6–7^{(5–7)}
Loss	5–9	Feb 2011	Pacific Coast Championships, US	250 Series	Hard (i)	(Canada) Milos Raonic	6–7^{(6–8)}, 6–7^{(5–7)}
Loss	5–10	May 2011	Estoril Open, Portugal	250 Series	Clay	(Argentina) Juan Martín del Potro	2–6, 2–6
Loss	5–11	Jul 2011	Swiss Open, Switzerland	250 Series	Clay	(Spain) Marcel Granollers	4–6, 6–3, 3–6
Loss	5–12	Mar 2012	Mexican Open, Mexico	500 Series	Clay	(Spain) David Ferrer	1–6, 2–6
Loss	5–13	Jul 2013	Swedish Open, Sweden	250 Series	Clay	(Argentina) Carlos Berlocq	5–7, 1–6
Win	6–13	Apr 2014	U.S. Men's Clay Court Championships, US	250 Series	Clay	(Spain) Nicolás Almagro	6–3, 7–6^{(7–4)}
Win	7–13	Apr 2016	Romanian Open, Romania	250 Series	Clay	(France) Lucas Pouille	6–3, 6–2
Loss	7–14	Jul 2016	Swedish Open, Sweden	250 Series	Clay	(Spain) Albert Ramos Viñolas	3–6, 4–6
Loss	7–15	Mar 2017	Dubai Tennis Championships, UAE	500 Series	Hard	(United Kingdom) Andy Murray	3–6, 2–6
Loss	7–16	Feb 2018	Rio Open, Brazil	500 Series	Clay	(Argentina) Diego Schwartzman	2–6, 3–6

=== Doubles: 13 (8 titles, 5 runner-ups) ===
Legend Grand Slam tournaments (0–0) ATP World Tour Finals (1–0) ATP World Tour Masters 1000 (0–1) ATP World Tour 500 Series (3–2) ATP World Tour 250 Series (4–2)	Titles by surface Hard (3–3) Clay (5–2) Grass (0–0)	Titles by setting Outdoor (5–4) Indoor (3–1)

Result	W–L	Date	Tournament	Tier	Surface	Partner	Opponents	Score
Win	1–0	Nov 2004	Stockholm Open, Sweden	International	Hard (i)	(Spain) Feliciano López	(Australia) Wayne Arthurs (Australia) Paul Hanley	6–4, 6–4
Loss	1–1	Jul 2007	Stuttgart Open, Germany	Intl. Gold	Clay	(Spain) Guillermo García López	(Czech Republic) František Čermák (Czech Republic) Leoš Friedl	4–6, 4–6
Loss	1–2	Jan 2009	Brisbane International, Australia	250 Series	Hard	(Germany) Mischa Zverev	(France) Marc Gicquel (France) Jo-Wilfried Tsonga	4–6, 3–6
Win	2–2	Feb 2012	Argentina Open, Argentina	250 Series	Clay	(Spain) David Marrero	(Slovakia) Michal Mertiňák (Brazil) André Sá	6–4, 6–4
Win	3–2	Mar 2012	Mexican Open, Mexico	500 Series	Clay	(Spain) David Marrero	(Spain) Marcel Granollers (Spain) Marc López	6–3, 6–4
Win	4–2	Jul 2012	Croatia Open, Croatia	250 Series	Clay	(Spain) David Marrero	(Spain) Marcel Granollers (Spain) Marc López	6–3, 7–6^{(7–4)}
Win	5–2	Jul 2012	German Open, Germany	500 Series	Clay	(Spain) David Marrero	(Brazil) Rogério Dutra Silva (Spain) Daniel Muñoz de la Nava	6–4, 6–3
Loss	5–3	Oct 2012	Valencia Open, Spain	500 Series	Hard (i)	(Spain) David Marrero	(Austria) Alexander Peya (Brazil) Bruno Soares	3–6, 2–6
Win	6–3	Sep 2013	St. Petersburg Open, Russia	250 Series	Hard (i)	(Spain) David Marrero	(United Kingdom) Dominic Inglot (Uzbekistan) Denis Istomin	7–6^{(8–6)}, 6–3
Loss	6–4	Oct 2013	Shanghai Masters, China	Masters 1000	Hard	(Spain) David Marrero	(Croatia) Ivan Dodig (Brazil) Marcelo Melo	6–7^{(2–7)}, 7–6^{(8–6)}, [2–10]
Win	7–4	Nov 2013	ATP World Tour Finals, UK	Tour Finals	Hard (i)	(Spain) David Marrero	(United States) Bob Bryan (United States) Mike Bryan	7–5, 6–7^{(3–7)}, [10–7]
Loss	7–5	Apr 2014	U.S. Men's Clay Court Championships, US	250 Series	Clay	(Spain) David Marrero	(United States) Bob Bryan (United States) Mike Bryan	6–4, 4–6, [9–11]
Win	8–5	Feb 2018	Rio Open, Brazil	500 Series	Clay	(Spain) David Marrero	(Croatia) Nikola Mektić (Austria) Alexander Peya	5–7, 7–5, [10–8]

=== Team competition finals: 4 (4 titles) ===
==== Davis Cup: 3 (3 titles) ====
Verdasco played with La Armada for seven consecutive seasons (2005 to 2011), winning the trophy in 2008 and 2009, as well as in 2011.

Edition	(Spain) Spanish Team	Rounds/Opponents/Score
2008	Fernando Verdasco; Rafael Nadal; David Ferrer; Feliciano López; Tommy Robredo; Nicolás Almagro	1R: Peru 0–5 Spain; QF: Germany 1–4 Spain; SF: Spain 4–1 USA; FN: Argentina 1–3 Spain
2009	Fernando Verdasco; Rafael Nadal; David Ferrer; Feliciano López; Tommy Robredo; Juan Carlos Ferrero	1R: Spain 4–1 Serbia; QF: Spain 3–2 Germany; SF: Spain 4–1 Israel; FN: Spain 5–0 Czech Republic
2011	Fernando Verdasco; Rafael Nadal; David Ferrer; Feliciano López; Marcel Granollers	1R: Belgium 1–4 Spain; QF: USA 1–3 Spain; SF: Spain 4–1 France; FN: Spain 3–1 Argentina

==== Hopman Cup: 1 (1 title) ====
Outcome	No.	Date	Tournament	Surface	Partner	Opponents	Score
Winner	1.	5 January 2013	Hopman Cup, Perth, Australia	Hard	(Spain) Anabel Medina Garrigues	(Serbia) Ana Ivanovic (Serbia) Novak Djokovic	2–1

=== Exhibition tournament finals: 2 (2 titles) ===
Outcome	No.	Date	Tournament	Surface	Opponent	Score
Winner	1.	16 January 2010	AAMI Classic, Melbourne, Australia	Hard	(France) Jo Wilfried Tsonga	7–5, 6–3
Winner	2.	16 January 2015	Priceline Pharmacy Classic, Melbourne, Australia	Hard	(Ukraine) Alexandr Dolgopolov	7–6^{(7–3)}, ret.

== Performance timelines ==
Key
W	F	SF	QF	#R	RR	Q#	P#	DNQ	A	Z#	PO	G	S	B	NMS	NTI	P	NH

(W) winner; (F) finalist; (SF) semifinalist; (QF) quarterfinalist; (#R) rounds 4, 3, 2, 1; (RR) round-robin stage; (Q#) qualification round; (P#) preliminary round; (DNQ) did not qualify; (A) absent; (Z#) Davis/Fed Cup Zonal Group (with number indication) or (PO) play-off; (G) gold, (S) silver or (B) bronze Olympic/Paralympic medal; (NMS) not a Masters tournament; (NTI) not a Tier I tournament; (P) postponed; (NH) not held; (SR) strike rate (events won / competed); (W–L) win–loss record.
To avoid confusion and double counting, these charts are updated at the conclusion of a tournament or when the player's participation has ended.

=== Singles ===
Tournament	2002	2003	2004	2005	2006	2007	2008	2009	2010	2011	2012	2013	2014	2015	2016	2017	2018	2019	2020	2021	2022	2023	SR	W–L	Win%
Grand Slam tournaments
Australian Open	A	Q1	1R	2R	2R	2R	2R	SF	4R	4R	1R	3R	2R	3R	2R	1R	2R	3R	3R	A	A	Q2	0 / 17	26–17	60%
French Open	A	Q1	2R	1R	2R	4R	4R	4R	4R	3R	3R	2R	4R	2R	3R	4R	4R	2R	A	1R	Q2	A	0 / 17	32–17	65%
Wimbledon	A	1R	2R	2R	4R	3R	4R	4R	1R	2R	3R	QF	1R	3R	1R	1R	1R	4R	NH	1R	1R	A	0 / 19	25–19	57%
US Open	A	3R	2R	4R	3R	3R	3R	QF	QF	3R	3R	1R	2R	2R	1R	2R	3R	2R	A	Q2	1R	A	0 / 18	30–18	63%
Win–loss	0–0	2–2	3–4	5–4	7–4	8–4	9–4	15–4	10–4	8–4	6–4	7–4	5–4	6–4	3–4	4–4	6–4	7–4	2–1	0–2	0–2	0–0	0 / 71	113–71	61%
Year-end championships
ATP Finals	did not qualify							RR	did not qualify														0 / 1	0–3	0%
ATP Tour Masters 1000
Indian Wells Masters	A	A	1R	2R	2R	2R	3R	QF	3R	3R	3R	2R	4R	3R	3R	3R	3R	A	NH	A	A	A	0 / 15	18–15	55%
Miami Masters	A	3R	1R	3R	2R	1R	2R	QF	QF	2R	3R	2R	2R	4R	3R	3R	4R	A	NH	1R	1R	A	0 / 18	19–18	51%
Monte-Carlo Masters	A	A	A	1R	1R	1R	1R	QF	F	2R	3R	1R	A	1R	2R	A	2R	1R	NH	A	A	A	0 / 13	10–13	43%
Madrid Masters^{1}	Q1	1R	3R	2R	1R	2R	2R	QF	3R	1R	QF	3R	2R	3R	2R	1R	2R	3R	NH	1R	A	A	0 / 18	19–18	51%
Rome Masters	A	Q1	A	QF	2R	1R	3R	QF	SF	2R	2R	2R	1R	A	A	2R	1R	QF	Q1	A	A	A	0 / 14	18–14	56%
Canada Masters	A	1R	A	A	3R	3R	2R	3R	2R	2R	A	A	A	1R	A	A	2R	A	NH	A	A	A	0 / 9	10–9	53%
Cincinnati Masters	A	1R	1R	A	1R	2R	3R	1R	2R	3R	A	A	2R	2R	2R	1R	1R	1R	A	Q1	A	A	0 / 14	8–14	36%
Shanghai Masters	Not Masters Series							2R	1R	2R	3R	2R	A	1R	1R	1R	A	1R	NH			A	0 / 9	4–9	31%
Paris Masters	A	Q2	1R	2R	1R	1R	3R	3R	3R	2R	1R	2R	3R	1R	2R	QF	2R	2R	A	A	A	A	0 / 16	14–16	47%
Hamburg Masters	A	A	3R	1R	QF	1R	QF	Not Masters Series															0 / 5	8–5	62%
Win–loss	0–0	2–4	4–6	8–7	8–9	5–9	10–9	15–9	14–9	7–9	10–7	5–7	6–6	6–8	8–7	6–7	8–8	6–6	0–0	0–2	0–1	0–0	0 / 130	128–130	50%
Career statistics
	2002	2003	2004	2005	2006	2007	2008	2009	2010	2011	2012	2013	2014	2015	2016	2017	2018	2019	2020	2021	2022	2023	Career		
Tournaments	2	12	26	27	25	26	28	23	23	24	22	24	21	26	27	25	28	27	7	8	11	5	447		
Titles	0	0	1	0	0	0	1	1	2	0	0	0	1	0	1	0	0	0	0	0	0	0	7		
Finals	0	0	2	1	0	1	2	3	4	3	1	1	1	0	2	1	1	0	0	0	0	0	23		
Overall win–loss	1–2	7–12	31–25	35–28	32–26	34–28	47–27	52–25	43–22	36–24	32–22	29–23	26–20	24–26	29–26	29–25	33–28	26–27	6–7	2–8	5–11	0–5	7 / 447	559–447	56%
Win (%)	33%	37%	55%	56%	55%	55%	64%	68%	66%	60%	59%	56%	57%	48%	53%	50%	54%	49%	50%	20%	31%	0%	55.68%		
Year-end ranking	173	109	36	32	35	26	16	9	9	24	24	30	33	49	42	35	28	49	65	154	124	651	$18,349,666		

^{1}Madrid was played in the fall on indoor hard courts until 2008. In 2009 it switched to outdoor clay in the spring.

=== Doubles ===
Tournament	2004	2005	2006	2007	2008	2009	2010	2011	2012	2013	2014	2015	2016	2017	2018	2019	2020	2021	2022	2023	2024	2025	SR	W–L	Win%
Grand Slam tournaments
Australian Open	A	1R	2R	1R	1R	QF	A	A	A	QF	2R	A	2R	1R	1R	2R	A	A	A	A	A	A	0 / 11	10–11	48%
French Open	1R	1R	1R	2R	A	1R	A	A	A	QF	2R	A	1R	SF	1R	A	A	A	A	A	A	A	0 / 10	9–10	47%
Wimbledon	2R	1R	A	1R	3R	A	A	A	A	A	A	A	A	1R	1R	A	NH	A	A	A	A	A	0 / 6	3–6	33%
US Open	QF	3R	1R	1R	QF	A	A	A	1R	1R	QF	2R	3R	1R	A	1R	A	A	A	A	A	A	0 / 12	14–12	54%
Win–loss	4–3	2–4	1–3	1–4	5–3	3–2	0–0	0–0	0–1	6–3	5–3	1–1	3–3	4–4	0–3	1–2	0–0	0–0	0–0	0–0	0–0	0–0	0 / 39	36–39	48%
Year-Ending Championships
ATP Finals	did not qualify									W	did not qualify												1 / 1	4–1	80%
ATP Tour Masters 1000
Indian Wells Masters	A	A	A	2R	A	1R	2R	1R	A	1R	2R	QF	1R	2R	1R	A	NH	A	A	A	A	A	0 / 10	5–9	36%
Miami Masters	A	2R	1R	1R	1R	A	QF	1R	QF	2R	QF	A	2R	1R	1R	A	NH	A	A	A	A	A	0 / 12	9–11	45%
Monte-Carlo Masters	A	A	A	1R	A	2R	1R	1R	2R	SF	A	2R	2R	A	1R	1R	NH	A	A	A	A	A	0 / 10	7–8	47%
Madrid Masters	A	QF	A	2R	2R	1R	1R	A	2R	SF	SF	A	2R	1R	2R	1R	NH	A	A	A	A	A	0 / 12	10–11	48%
Rome Masters	A	A	A	A	QF	1R	1R	1R	1R	QF	QF	A	A	2R	1R	2R	A	A	A	A	A	A	0 / 10	7–9	44%
Canada Masters	1R	A	A	A	2R	2R	A	2R	A	A	A	QF	A	A	1R	A	NH	A	A	A	A	A	0 / 6	5–6	45%
Cincinnati Masters	A	A	1R	A	1R	2R	2R	1R	A	A	2R	A	A	2R	SF	A	A	A	A	A	A	A	0 / 8	6–8	43%
Shanghai Masters	Not Masters Series					2R	A	1R	1R	F	A	A	A	A	A	1R	NH			A	A	A	0 / 5	4–4	50%
Paris Masters	A	A	1R	A	1R	A	A	1R	A	2R	2R	A	A	2R	A	1R	A	A	A	A	A	A	0 / 7	2–7	22%
Win–loss	0–1	2–2	0–3	2–4	4–6	4–7	4–6	1–8	4–5	14–7	9–6	5–3	3–4	4–6	4–6	1–5	0–0	0–0	0–0	0–0	0–0	0–0	0 / 80	55–73	43%
Career statistics
	2004	2005	2006	2007	2008	2009	2010	2011	2012	2013	2014	2015	2016	2017	2018	2019	2020	2021	2022	2023	2024	2025	Career		
Titles	1	0	0	0	0	0	0	0	4	2	0	0	0	0	1	0	0	0	0	0	0	0	8		
Finals	1	0	0	1	0	1	0	0	5	3	1	0	0	0	1	0	0	0	0	0	0	0	13		
Overall win–loss	11–6	11–14	6–14	8–14	20–19	12–10	4–7	2–16	26–10	39–20	18–16	11–9	8–8	12–13	10–15	4–11	1–1	0–0	2–1	0–0	0–0	1–1	206–205		50%
Year-end ranking	–	83	–	112	51	84	201	393	29	8	37	99	169	66	80	192	379	1296	557	–	–	–	50%		

== Wins over top 10 players ==
- He has a 28–108 record against players who were, at the time the match was played, ranked in the top 10.

Year	2001	2002	2003	2004	2005	2006	2007	2008	2009	2010	2011	2012	2013	2014	2015	2016	2017	2018	2019	2020	2021	2022	2023	Total
Wins	0	0	0	1	2	2	1	1	2	5	1	2	0	1	2	2	2	3	1	0	0	0	0	28

#	Player	Rank	Event	Surface	Rd	Score
2004
1.	(Spain) Juan Carlos Ferrero	3	Valencia Open, Valencia, Spain	Clay	SF	6–2, 6–1
2005
2.	(United States) Andy Roddick	3	Miami Masters, Miami, USA	Hard	2R	7–6^{(11–9)}, 4–3, ret.
3.	(United States) Andy Roddick	3	Italian Open, Rome, Italy	Clay	3R	6–7^{(1–7)}, 7–6^{(7–3)}, 6–4
2006
4.	(Chile) Fernando González	8	German Open, Hamburg, Germany	Clay	3R	3–6, 6–2, 6–3
5.	(Argentina) David Nalbandian	3	Wimbledon Championships London, UK	Grass	3R	7–6^{(11–9)}, 7–6^{(11–9)}, 6–2
2007
6.	(France) Richard Gasquet	8	Rogers Cup, Montreal, Canada	Hard	2R	3–6, 7–6^{(9–7)}, 6–4
2008
7.	(Spain) David Ferrer	5	German Open, Hamburg, Germany	Clay	3R	7–6^{(7–4)}, 6–2
2009
8.	(United Kingdom) Andy Murray	4	Australian Open, Melbourne, Australia	Hard	4R	2–6, 6–1, 1–6, 6–3, 6–4
9.	(France) Jo-Wilfried Tsonga	7	Australian Open, Melbourne, Australia	Hard	QF	7–6^{(7–2)}, 3–6, 6–3, 6–2
2010
10.	(United States) Andy Roddick	7	SAP Open, San Jose, USA	Hard (i)	F	3–6, 6–4, 6–4
11.	(Croatia) Marin Čilić	9	Miami Masters, Miami, USA	Hard	4R	6–4, 7–6^{(7–3)}
12.	(Serbia) Novak Djokovic	2	Monte Carlo Masters, Monte Carlo, Monaco	Clay	SF	6–2, 6–2
13.	(Sweden) Robin Söderling	8	Barcelona Open, Barcelona, Spain	Clay	F	6–3, 4–6, 6–3
14.	(Serbia) Novak Djokovic	2	Italian Open, Rome, Italy	Clay	QF	7–6^{(7–4)}, 3–6, 6–4
2011
15.	(Spain) Nicolas Almagro	10	Swiss Open, Gstaad, Switzerland	Clay	SF	6–7^{(2–7)}, 7–6^{(7–2)}, 6–3
2012
16.	(Spain) Rafael Nadal	2	Madrid Open, Madrid, Spain	Clay	3R	6–3, 3–6, 7–5
17.	(Argentina) Juan Mónaco	10	Shanghai Masters, Shanghai, China	Hard	3R	6–4, 6–2
2014
18.	(France) Richard Gasquet	9	BNP Paribas Open, Indian Wells, USA	Hard	3R	7–6^{(7–5)}, 6–1
2015
19.	(Spain) Rafael Nadal	3	Miami Masters, Miami, USA	Hard	3R	6–4, 2–6, 6–3
20.	(Croatia) Marin Čilić	10	Madrid Open, Madrid, Spain	Clay	3R	6–7^{(5–7)}, 7–6^{(7–5)}, 6–3
2016
21.	(Spain) Rafael Nadal	5	Australian Open, Melbourne, Australia	Hard	1R	7–6^{(8–6)}, 4–6, 3–6, 7–6^{(7–4)}, 6–2
22.	(Switzerland) Stan Wawrinka	5	Queen's Club, London, UK	Grass	1R	6–2, 7–6^{(7–3)}
2017
23.	(Germany) Alexander Zverev	10	French Open, Paris, France	Clay	1R	6–4, 3–6, 6–4, 6–2
24.	(Austria) Dominic Thiem	6	Rolex Paris Masters, Paris, France	Hard (i)	3R	6–4, 6–4
2018
25.	(Austria) Dominic Thiem	6	Rio Open, Rio de Janeiro, Brazil	Clay	QF	6–4, 6–0
26.	(Bulgaria) Grigor Dimitrov	4	BNP Paribas Open, Indian Wells, USA	Hard	2R	7–6^{(7–4)}, 4–6, 6–3
27.	(Bulgaria) Grigor Dimitrov	5	French Open, Paris, France	Clay	3R	7–6^{(7–4)}, 6–2, 6–4
2019
28.	(Austria) Dominic Thiem	4	Italian Open, Rome, Italy	Clay	2R	4–6, 6–4, 7–5

== ATP Tour career earnings ==
Year	Grand Slam singles titles	ATP singles titles	Total singles titles	Earnings ($)	Money list rank
2002	0	0	0	33,195	303
2003	0	0	0	142,162	134
2004	0	1	1	505,535	42
2005	0	0	0	568,607	36
2006	0	0	0	535,937	34
2007	0	0	0	631,695	33
2008	0	1	1	977,961	15
2009	0	1	1	1,916,630	9
2010	0	2	2	1,971,365	9
2011	0	0	0	821,021	32
2012	0	0	0	1,005,846	22
2013	0	0	0	$1,334,555	19
2014	0	1	1	973,658
2015	0	0	0	819,608	43
2016	0	1	1	846,059	49
2017	0	0	0	1,383,569	30
2018	0	0	0	1,654,378	26
2019	0	0	0	1,288,511	40
2020	0	0	0	210,176	140
2021	0	0	0	251,120	163
2022	0	0	0	331,981	158
2023	0	0	0	91,525	345
2024	0	0	0	0	N/A
2025	0	0	0	161	1388
Career	0	7	7	$18,349,666	40

== See also ==
- Spain Davis Cup team
- List of Spain Davis Cup team representatives
- Tennis in Spain
