= 2010 Monte-Carlo Rolex Masters – Doubles =

Doubles
- 2010 Monte-Carlo Rolex Masters

Final
- Champions: (Canada) Daniel Nestor (Serbia) Nenad Zimonjić
- Runners-up: (India) Mahesh Bhupathi (Belarus) Max Mirnyi
- Score: 6–3, 2–0, ret.

Events
Singles	Doubles
← 2009 ·	Monte-Carlo Rolex Masters	· 2011 →

Daniel Nestor and Nenad Zimonjić were the defending champions and won in the final after the retirement of Mahesh Bhupathi and Max Mirnyi (while leading 6–3, 2–0).

== Seeds ==
All seeds receive a bye into the second round.

1. (Canada) Daniel Nestor / (Serbia) Nenad Zimonjić (champions)
2. (United States) Bob Bryan / (United States) Mike Bryan (quarterfinals)
3. (Czech Republic) Lukáš Dlouhý / (India) Leander Paes (second round)
4. (South Africa) Wesley Moodie / (Belgium) Dick Norman (semifinals)
5. (India) Mahesh Bhupathi / (Belarus) Max Mirnyi (final, retired)
6. (Poland) Łukasz Kubot / (Austria) Oliver Marach (quarterfinals)
7. (Sweden) Simon Aspelin / (Australia) Paul Hanley (semifinals)
8. (The Bahamas) Mark Knowles / (Brazil) Bruno Soares (quarterfinals)

== Draw ==
=== Key ===
- Q = Qualifier
- WC = Wild card
- LL = Lucky loser
- Alt = Alternate
- SE = Special exempt
- PR = Protected ranking
- ITF = ITF entry
- JE = Junior exempt
- w/o = Walkover
- r = Retired
- d = Defaulted
- SR = Special ranking

=== Finals ===
Semifinals
1	(Canada) Daniel Nestor (Serbia) Nenad Zimonjić	6	6
4	(South Africa) Wesley Moodie (Belgium) Dick Norman	0	4
7	(Sweden) Simon Aspelin (Australia) Paul Hanley	3	6^{3}
5	(India) Mahesh Bhupathi (Belarus) Max Mirnyi	6	7^{7}

Final
1	(Canada) Daniel Nestor (Serbia) Nenad Zimonjić	6	2
5	(India) Mahesh Bhupathi (Belarus) Max Mirnyi	3	0^{r}

=== Top half ===
First round
(Croatia) M Čilić (Germany) C Kas	4	6^{8}
(Austria) J Melzer (Russia) M Youzhny	6	7^{10}
(Spain) M Granollers (Spain) T Robredo	6	4	[7]
WC	(France) R Gasquet (France) J-W Tsonga	2	6	[10]
(Serbia) N Djokovic (Serbia) V Troicki	6	7
(Brazil) T Bellucci (Spain) A Montañés	1	5
(Germany) P Kohlschreiber (Sweden) R Lindstedt	7	5	[9]
(Spain) N Almagro (Croatia) I Ljubičić	5	7	[11]

Second round
1	(Canada) D Nestor (Serbia) N Zimonjić	6	7^{7}
(Austria) J Melzer (Russia) M Youzhny	3	6^{1}
WC	(France) R Gasquet (France) J-W Tsonga
8	(The Bahamas) M Knowles (Brazil) B Soares	w/o
4	(South Africa) W Moodie (Belgium) D Norman	2	6	[10]
(Serbia) N Djokovic (Serbia) V Troicki	6	4	[8]
(Spain) N Almagro (Croatia) I Ljubičić	4	7^{7}	[4]
6	(Poland) Ł Kubot (Austria) O Marach	6	6^{4}	[10]

Quarterfinals
1	(Canada) D Nestor (Serbia) N Zimonjić	6	6^{4}	[10]
8	(The Bahamas) M Knowles (Brazil) B Soares	2	7^{7}	[6]
4	(South Africa) W Moodie (Belgium) D Norman	2	6	[10]
6	(Poland) Ł Kubot (Austria) O Marach	6	4	[4]

Semifinals
1	(Canada) D Nestor (Serbia) N Zimonjić	6	6
4	(South Africa) W Moodie (Belgium) D Norman	0	4

=== Bottom half ===
First round
(United States) E Butorac (Germany) M Kohlmann	6	6
(Spain) G García-López (Switzerland) S Wawrinka	3	0
(Spain) D Ferrer (Spain) M López	6	3	[12]
(Spain) F López (Spain) F Verdasco	4	6	[10]
(Austria) J Knowle (Israel) A Ram	3	6	[3]
(Poland) M Fyrstenberg (Poland) M Matkowski	6	3	[10]
(Czech Republic) F Čermák (Slovakia) M Mertiňák	1	5
WC	(United Kingdom) R Hutchins (United Kingdom) A Murray	6	7

Second round
7	(Sweden) S Aspelin (Australia) P Hanley	5	6	[10]
(United States) E Butorac (Germany) M Kohlmann	7	2	[6]
(Spain) D Ferrer (Spain) M López	6	6
3	(Czech Republic) L Dlouhý (India) L Paes	3	2
5	(India) M Bhupathi (Belarus) M Mirnyi	7^{7}	7^{9}
(Poland) M Fyrstenberg (Poland) M Matkowski	6^{3}	6^{7}
WC	(United Kingdom) R Hutchins (United Kingdom) A Murray	7^{7}	2	[2]
2	(United States) B Bryan (United States) M Bryan	6^{4}	6	[10]

Quarterfinals
7	(Sweden) S Aspelin (Australia) P Hanley	7^{7}	6
(Spain) D Ferrer (Spain) M López	6^{2}	3
5	(India) M Bhupathi (Belarus) M Mirnyi	3	6	[11]
2	(United States) B Bryan (United States) M Bryan	6	3	[9]

Semifinals
7	(Sweden) S Aspelin (Australia) P Hanley	3	6^{3}
5	(India) M Bhupathi (Belarus) M Mirnyi	6	7^{7}
