= 2014 U.S. Men's Clay Court Championships – Singles =

Singles
- 2014 U.S. Men's Clay Court Championships

Final
- Champion: (Spain) Fernando Verdasco
- Runner-up: (Spain) Nicolás Almagro
- Score: 6–3, 7–6^{(7–4)}

Details
- Draw: 28
- Seeds: 8

Events
Singles	Doubles
- U.S. Men's Clay Court Championships

John Isner was the defending champion, but lost in the second round to Dustin Brown.

Fernando Verdasco won the title, defeating Nicolás Almagro in the final, 6–3, 7–6^{(7–4)}.

== Seeds ==
The top four seeds received a bye into the second round.

1. (United States) John Isner (second round)
2. (Spain) Tommy Robredo (second round)
3. (Spain) Nicolás Almagro (final)
4. (Spain) Fernando Verdasco (champion)
5. (Spain) Feliciano López (second round, retired)
6. (Argentina) Juan Mónaco (second round)
7. (Australia) Lleyton Hewitt (second round)
8. (Croatia) Ivo Karlović (first round)

== Draw ==
Key

- Q = Qualifier
- WC = Wild card
- LL = Lucky loser
- Alt = Alternate
- ITF = ITF entry
- PR = Protected ranking
- SR = Special ranking
- SE = Special exempt
- JE = Junior exempt
- JR = Junior Accelerator Programme entrant
- CO = College Accelerator Programme entrant
- NG = Next Gen Accelerator Program entrant
- w/o = Walkover
- r = Retired
- d = Defaulted

=== Finals ===
Semifinals
(United States) Sam Querrey
3	(Spain) Nicolás Almagro	w/o
4	(Spain) Fernando Verdasco	6	7
(Colombia) Santiago Giraldo	4	5

Final
3	(Spain) Nicolás Almagro	3	6^{4}
4	(Spain) Fernando Verdasco	6	7^{7}

=== Top half ===
First round
WC	(United States) R Williams	1	2
(Germany) D Brown	6	6
(Russia) A Bogomolov Jr.	4	6^{6}
(United States) S Querrey	6	7^{8}
Q	(Canada) P Polansky	4	6	4
7	(Australia) L Hewitt	6	3	6
(United States) M Russell	6	7^{7}
(Spain) D Gimeno Traver	3	6^{2}
(Germany) B Becker	6	1	6
Q	(Spain) R Ramírez Hidalgo	1	6	3
(United States) J Sock	6	6
8	(Croatia) I Karlović	1	4

Second round
1	(United States) J Isner	4	7^{9}	6^{4}
(Germany) D Brown	6	6^{7}	7^{7}
(United States) S Querrey	6	6
7	(Australia) L Hewitt	3	4
3	(Spain) N Almagro	6	6
(United States) M Russell	2	3
(Germany) B Becker	4	3
(United States) J Sock	6	6

Quarterfinals
(Germany) D Brown	3	7^{10}	3
(United States) S Querrey	6	6^{8}	6
3	(Spain) N Almagro	6	6
(United States) J Sock	2	4

Semifinals
(United States) S Querrey
3	(Spain) N Almagro	w/o

=== Bottom half ===
First round
6	(Argentina) J Mónaco	7^{7}	6
(India) S Devvarman	6^{4}	2
Q	(United States) R Harrison	0	1
(United States) D Young	6	6
WC	(United States) S Johnson	6	7^{7}
(United States) D Kudla	3	6^{4}
5	(Spain) F López	7	6
Q	(United States) R Ginepri	5	2
WC	(Cyprus) M Baghdatis	6	2	1
(Colombia) A González	4	6	6
(Colombia) S Giraldo	6	6
(Australia) M Ebden	1	2

Second round
6	(Argentina) J Mónaco	7^{7}	4	3
(United States) D Young	6^{4}	6	6
WC	(United States) S Johnson	0	6	3
4	(Spain) F Verdasco	6	4	6
5	(Spain) F López	3	0^{r}
(Colombia) A González	6	2
(Colombia) S Giraldo	6	6
2	(Spain) T Robredo	3	4

Quarterfinals
(United States) D Young	6^{1}	1
4	(Spain) F Verdasco	7^{7}	6
(Colombia) A González	3	4
(Colombia) S Giraldo	6	6

Semifinals
4	(Spain) F Verdasco	6	7
(Colombia) S Giraldo	4	5

== Qualifying ==
=== Seeds ===
1. (United States) Ryan Harrison (qualified)
2. (United States) Alex Kuznetsov (first round)
3. (Canada) Peter Polansky (qualified)
4. (United States) Wayne Odesnik (first round)
5. (Netherlands) Thiemo de Bakker (qualifying competition)
6. (Belgium) Ruben Bemelmans (qualifying competition)
7. (Spain) Rubén Ramírez Hidalgo (qualified)
8. (Ukraine) Illya Marchenko (second round)

=== Qualifiers ===
1. (United States) Ryan Harrison
2. (United States) Robby Ginepri
3. (Canada) Peter Polansky
4. (Spain) Rubén Ramírez Hidalgo

=== Qualifying draw ===
==== First qualifier ====
First round
1	(United States) Ryan Harrison	6	6
(United States) Andrew Carter	4	4
WC	(United States) Bayo Philips	1	0
(Republic of Ireland) Louk Sorensen	6	6
WC	(Sweden) Adam Gustavsson	6	0	4
WC	(India) Srikar Alla	3	6	6
(United States) Mitchell Krueger	5	3
6	(Belgium) Ruben Bemelmans	7	6

Second round
1	(United States) Ryan Harrison	6	5	6
(Republic of Ireland) Louk Sorensen	0	7	4
WC	(India) Srikar Alla	2	2
6	(Belgium) Ruben Bemelmans	6	6

Qualifying competition
1	(United States) Ryan Harrison	1	7	7^{7}
6	(Belgium) Ruben Bemelmans	6	5	6^{3}

==== Second qualifier ====
First round
2	(United States) Alex Kuznetsov	6	2	1
(United States) Robby Ginepri	2	6	6
(India) Purav Raja	4	3
(United States) Bjorn Fratangelo	6	6
(South Africa) Fritz Wolmarans	7	2	2
(Australia) Thanasi Kokkinakis	5	6	6
(Australia) John-Patrick Smith	4	2
8	(Ukraine) Illya Marchenko	6	6

Second round
(United States) Robby Ginepri	6	6^{5}	6
(United States) Bjorn Fratangelo	3	7^{7}	3
(Australia) Thanasi Kokkinakis	6	6
8	(Ukraine) Illya Marchenko	1	4

Qualifying competition
(United States) Robby Ginepri	7	7^{8}
(Australia) Thanasi Kokkinakis	5	6^{6}

==== Third qualifier ====
First round
3	(Canada) Peter Polansky	7^{9}	6
(Italy) Erik Crepaldi	6^{7}	1
(Croatia) Ante Pavić	7^{7}	6
(Italy) Andrea Arnaboldi	6^{2}	3
(Germany) Alexander Zverev	5	6	2^{r}
(Germany) Mischa Zverev	7	4	3
(Poland) Bojan Szumański	0	1
5	(Netherlands) Thiemo de Bakker	6	6

Second round
3	(Canada) Peter Polansky	7^{7}	7^{7}
(Croatia) Ante Pavić	6^{3}	6^{4}
(Germany) Mischa Zverev	6^{4}	6	1
5	(Netherlands) Thiemo de Bakker	7^{7}	1	6

Qualifying competition
3	(Canada) Peter Polansky	6	6
5	(Netherlands) Thiemo de Bakker	4	3

==== Fourth qualifier ====
First round
4	(United States) Wayne Odesnik	2	3
(Australia) Jason Kubler	6	6
(Zimbabwe) Takanyi Garanganga	6^{5}	7^{7}	6
(Germany) Nils Langer	7^{7}	6^{2}	2
(United States) Greg Ouellette	6	6
WC	(United States) David Warren	3	3
(United States) Patrick Davidson	1	0
7	(Spain) Rubén Ramírez Hidalgo	6	6

Second round
(Australia) Jason Kubler	3	4
(Zimbabwe) Takanyi Garanganga	6	6
(United States) Greg Ouellette	3	3
7	(Spain) Rubén Ramírez Hidalgo	6	6

Qualifying competition
(Zimbabwe) Takanyi Garanganga	1	7	3
7	(Spain) Rubén Ramírez Hidalgo	6	5	6
