= 2014 U.S. Men's Clay Court Championships =

- Date: April 7–13
- Edition: 46th
- Category: World Tour 250
- Draw: 28S / 16D
- Prize money: $474,005
- Surface: Clay
- Location: Houston, Texas, United States
- Venue: River Oaks Country Club

Champions

Singles
- (Spain) Fernando Verdasco

Doubles
- (United States) Bob Bryan / (United States) Mike Bryan
- U.S. Men's Clay Court Championships

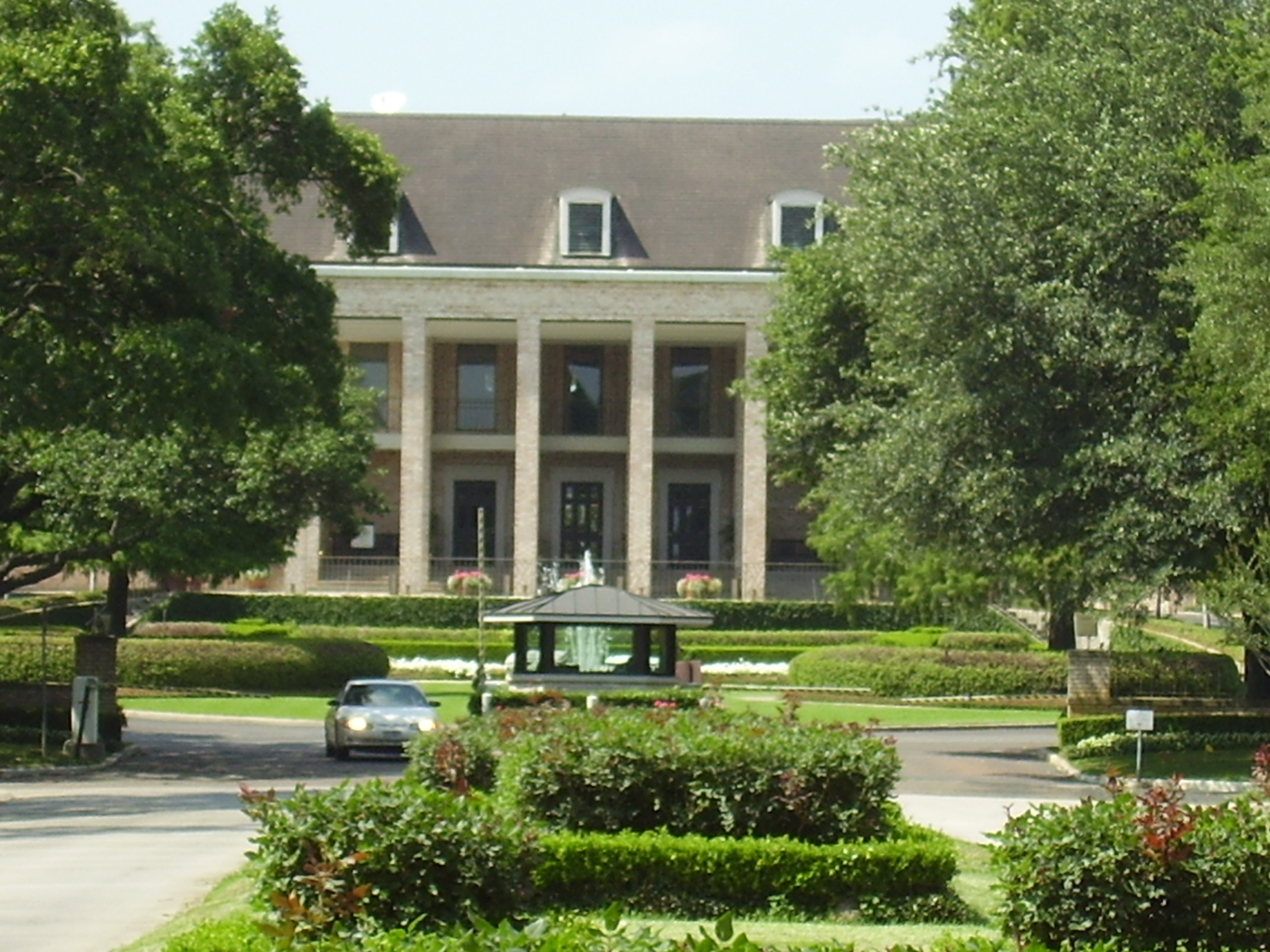
River Oaks Country Club

The 2014 U.S. Men's Clay Court Championships (also known as the Fayez Sarofim & Co. U.S. Men's Clay Court Championships for sponsorship purposes) is a tennis tournament played on outdoor clay courts. It is part of the 2014 ATP World Tour. It is the 46th edition of the U.S. Men's Clay Court Championships, and an ATP World Tour 250 event. It will take place at River Oaks Country Club in Houston, Texas, United States, from April 7 through April 13, 2014. Fourth-seeded Fernando Verdasco won the singles title.

== Finals ==
=== Singles ===
- (Spain) Fernando Verdasco defeated (Spain) Nicolás Almagro, 6–3, 7–6^{(7–4)}

=== Doubles ===
- (United States) Bob Bryan / (United States) Mike Bryan defeated (Spain) David Marrero / (Spain) Fernando Verdasco, 4–6, 6–4, [11–9]

== Singles main-draw entrants ==
=== Seeds ===
Country	Player	Rank^{1}	Seed
USA	John Isner	9	1
ESP	Tommy Robredo	14	2
ESP	Nicolás Almagro	20	3
ESP	Fernando Verdasco	29	4
ESP	Feliciano López	31	5
ARG	Juan Mónaco	42	6
AUS	Lleyton Hewitt	46	7
CRO	Ivo Karlović	52	8

- Rankings are as of March 31, 2014.

=== Other entrants ===
The following players received wildcards into the main draw:

- (Cyprus) Marcos Baghdatis
- (United States) Steve Johnson
- (United States) Rhyne Williams

The following players received entry via the qualifying draw:

- (United States) Robby Ginepri
- (United States) Ryan Harrison
- (Canada) Peter Polansky
- (Spain) Rubén Ramírez Hidalgo

=== Withdrawals ===
Before the tournament

- (Uruguay) Pablo Cuevas
- (Colombia) Alejandro Falla
- (United States) Bradley Klahn
- (Serbia) Janko Tipsarević (foot injury)

During the tournament

- (United States) Sam Querrey

=== Retirements ===
- (Spain) Feliciano López (illness)

== Doubles main-draw entrants ==
=== Seeds ===
Country	Player	Country	Player	Rank^{1}	Seed
USA	Bob Bryan	USA	Mike Bryan	2	1
ESP	David Marrero	ESP	Fernando Verdasco	16	2
MEX	Santiago González	USA	Scott Lipsky	76	3
CRO	Mate Pavić	AUS	John-Patrick Smith	125	4

- Rankings are as of March 31, 2014.

=== Other entrants ===
The following pair received wildcards into the doubles main draw:

- (United States) Steve Johnson / (United States) Sam Querrey

The following pair received entry as alternates:

- (Netherlands) Thiemo de Bakker / (Netherlands) Melle van Gemerden

=== Withdrawals ===
Before the tournament

- (United States) Ryan Harrison (back injury)
