= 2014 U.S. Men's Clay Court Championships – Doubles =

Doubles
- 2014 U.S. Men's Clay Court Championships

Final
- Champions: (United States) Bob Bryan (United States) Mike Bryan
- Runners-up: (Spain) David Marrero (Spain) Fernando Verdasco
- Score: 4–6, 6–4, [11–9]

Details
- Draw: 16
- Seeds: 4

Events
Singles	Doubles
- U.S. Men's Clay Court Championships

Jamie Murray and John Peers were the defending champions, but they chose to compete in Casablanca instead.
Bob Bryan and Mike Bryan won the title, defeating David Marrero and Fernando Verdasco in the final, 4–6, 6–4, [11–9]

== Seeds ==
1. (United States) Bob Bryan / (United States) Mike Bryan (champions)
2. (Spain) David Marrero / (Spain) Fernando Verdasco (final)
3. (Mexico) Santiago González / (United States) Scott Lipsky (first round)
4. (Croatia) Mate Pavić / (Australia) John-Patrick Smith (first round)

== Draw ==
Key

- Q = Qualifier
- WC = Wild card
- LL = Lucky loser
- Alt = Alternate
- ITF = ITF entry
- PR = Protected ranking
- SR = Special ranking
- SE = Special exempt
- JE = Junior exempt
- JR = Junior Accelerator Programme entrant
- CO = College Accelerator Programme entrant
- NG = Next Gen Accelerator Program entrant
- w/o = Walkover
- r = Retired
- d = Defaulted

=== Draw ===
First round
1	(United States) B Bryan (United States) M Bryan	6	6
(United States) N Monroe (United States) D Young	3	4
(Australia) M Ebden (Australia) S Groth	6	7^{7}
(United Kingdom) K Skupski (United Kingdom) N Skupski	4	6^{2}
3	(Mexico) S González (United States) S Lipsky	5	2
(India) P Raja (India) D Sharan	7	6
(Australia) C Guccione (Australia) L Hewitt	6	6
(Croatia) M Draganja (Germany) G Kretschmer	4	4
(Germany) B Becker (Australia) R Junaid	7^{7}	6
WC	(United States) S Johnson (United States) S Querrey	6^{1}	2
(Colombia) S Giraldo (Colombia) A González	7^{9}	6
4	(Croatia) M Pavić (Australia) J-P Smith	6^{7}	4
Alt	(Netherlands) T de Bakker (Netherlands) M van Gemerden	3	5
(United States) A Krajicek (New Zealand) M Venus	6	7
(Israel) J Erlich (Slovakia) M Mertiňák	4	2
2	(Spain) D Marrero (Spain) F Verdasco	6	6

Quarterfinals
1	(United States) B Bryan (United States) M Bryan	6	3	[12]
(Australia) M Ebden (Australia) S Groth	2	6	[10]
(India) P Raja (India) D Sharan	2	4
(Australia) C Guccione (Australia) L Hewitt	6	6
(Germany) B Becker (Australia) R Junaid	6	6^{1}	[9]
(Colombia) S Giraldo (Colombia) A González	1	7^{7}	[11]
(United States) A Krajicek (New Zealand) M Venus	3	1
2	(Spain) D Marrero (Spain) F Verdasco	6	6

Semifinals
1	(United States) B Bryan (United States) M Bryan	7	6
(Australia) C Guccione (Australia) L Hewitt	5	3
(Colombia) S Giraldo (Colombia) A González	4	2
2	(Spain) D Marrero (Spain) F Verdasco	6	6

Final
1	(United States) B Bryan (United States) M Bryan	4	6	[11]
2	(Spain) D Marrero (Spain) F Verdasco	6	4	[9]
