= 2010 Monte-Carlo Rolex Masters =

- Date: 10–18 April
- Edition: 104th
- Category: World Tour Masters 1000
- Draw: 56S / 24D
- Prize money: $2,227,500
- Surface: Clay / outdoor
- Location: Roquebrune-Cap-Martin, France
- Venue: Monte Carlo Country Club

Champions

Singles
- (Spain) Rafael Nadal

Doubles
- (Canada) Daniel Nestor / (Serbia) Nenad Zimonjić
| ← 2009 · | Monte-Carlo Masters | · 2011 → |

The 2010 Monte-Carlo Rolex Masters, a men's tennis tournament for male professional players, was played from 10 April through 18 April 2010, on outdoor clay courts. It was the 104th edition of the annual Monte Carlo Masters tournament, which is sponsored by Rolex for the second time. It took place at the Monte Carlo Country Club in Roquebrune-Cap-Martin, France, near Monte Carlo, Monaco. Second-seeded Rafael Nadal won the singles title.

== Tournament ==
=== Singles ===
In the singles saw a relatively low number of top players as only 11 of the top 20 players were present compared to 16 the previous year, adding to only 5 top ten players were present compared to 9 the previous year. In the first round the top 8 seeds receive a bye and the action saw Nicolás Almagro, Philipp Kohlschreiber came back from a first set loss to win in three. While two-time champion and one of two former champions 9th seed Juan Carlos Ferrero made quick work of Marcel Granollers with a 6–0 6–3 victory. He was joined by other seeds David Ferrer, Tomáš Berdych and Juan Mónaco who earned his first victory over Jarkko Nieminen. And high-profiled names David Nalbandian and Richard Gasquet also made it through, the only seed to fall was 16th seed Marcos Baghdatis who fell to Albert Montañés in straight sets. The first players who went through the third round were seeded players Fernando Verdasco, Jo-Wilfried Tsonga, and Tomáš Berdych who won in straight sets, while 4th seed Marin Čilić grinded to win in three over Igor Andreev. They were followed in by 5 Spaniards led by defending champion Rafael Nadal, two-time champion Juan Carlos Ferrero, David Ferrer and Tommy Robredo who all won in straight sets and Albert Montañés. Top seed Novak Djokovic also made in through in straight sets. The second round produced major upsets mainly involving the Germans as clay-court specialist and 14th seed Juan Mónaco fell to Michael Berrer 6–4, 6–4, world no. 4 Andy Murray fell in just over an hour to Philipp Kohlschreiber and 15th seed Jürgen Melzer falling to Philipp Petzschner. In the final match of the second round saw David Nalbandian upsetting 7th seed Mikhail Youzhny 4–6, 6–3, 7-6(5), when Youzhny failed to serve it out at 5–4 in the final set.

In the third round action saw world no. 2 Novak Djokovic delivering a 6–4, 6–4 victory over 13th seed Stanislas Wawrinka in an error filled match. Murray's conqueror Philipp Kohlschreiber continues his good form over compatriot Philipp Petzschner. 5 Spaniards out of the 6 made it through led by defending champion Rafael Nadal who dropped just his second game with a 6–0, 6–1 victory. He was joined by 9th seed Juan Carlos Ferrero, who survived a marathon match over 5th seed Jo-Wilfried Tsonga with a 6–1, 3–6, 7–5, converting in his 3rd match point. Spaniards Albert Montañés and David Ferrer who upset higher ranked Croatian players in Marin Čilić and Ivan Ljubičić respectively. Fernando Verdasco also advance over Tomáš Berdych coming back from a set down with a 5–7, 6–3, 6–2 victory. David Nalbandian who got in the main draw through a protected ranking progress over the lone Spaniard who fell Tommy Robredo with a 6–3, 6–4 victory.

The quarterfinals saw David Ferrer progress to his first Monte Carlo Semi-final ending Philipp Kohlschreiber's run with a 7–5, 7–6(1) victory. He is now set to face defending champion Rafael Nadal who won a match-up of the lone former champions in the tournament with a 6–4, 6–2 victory over 2-time champion Juan Carlos Ferrero. In the other semifinals it will feature last year's finalist and top seed Novak Djokovic who defeated a resurging David Nalbandian 6–2, 6–3. He will now face Fernando Verdasco, who defeated compatriot Albert Montañés 6–3, 6–7(4), 6–0 to reach the semifinals. The semifinals saw both matches going one sided as defending champion Rafael Nadal cruised through compatriot David Ferrer with a 6–2, 6–3 victory. He will now face his third consecutive Spanish opponent in Fernando Verdasco who upset top seed Novak Djokovic with a 6–2, 6–2 victory ending his 5 match losing streak to the Serbian. It will be the first all-Spanish final at an ATP World Tour Masters 1000 tournament since Monte-Carlo in 2002 when Juan Carlos Ferrero defeated Carlos Moyá. In the final Nadal demolished Verdasco with a 6–0, 6–1 and was his third match out of 5 that he just lost a game. Nadal also only lost 6 games in a match in the tournament the most and it was against Juan Carlos Ferrero. Nadal recorded his record tying 6th Monte-Carlo title with Reginald Doherty and became the first player in the Open Era to win a tournament title for six straight years. Nadal only lost 14 games en route to the title, the fewest in the open era for any Atp tournament champion who played five matches.

=== Doubles ===
In the first round action saw all seeds receiving a bye to the second round. It also saw teams of Richard Gasquet/Jo-Wilfried Tsonga, Novak Djokovic/Viktor Troicki and Jürgen Melzer/Mikhail Youzhny. It also saw the team of Andy Murray and Ross Hutchins upsetting one of the top doubles team of Michal Mertiňák and František Čermák in straight sets and the Spanish duo of David Ferrer & Marc López overcoming compatriots Fernando Verdasco & Feliciano López in three sets. In the second round the first teams to get through were 4th seeds Wesley Moodie / Dick Norman and 5th seeds Mahesh Bhupathi / Max Mirnyi who both grinded to get to the Quarterfinals. The team of David Ferrer & Marc López upset 2009 French Open champions and 3rd seed Lukáš Dlouhý & Leander Paes in straight sets. Top seed and defending champions Daniel Nestor / Nenad Zimonjić who won in straight over Jürgen Melzer / Mikhail Youzhny. 2nd seeds Bob Bryan / Mike Bryan, 6th seeds Łukasz Kubot / Oliver Marach and 7th seeds Simon Aspelin / Paul Hanley all needed a third set match tie-break to make it through the quarterfinals. 8th seeds Mark Knowles / Bruno Soares progress to the quarterfinals when Richard Gasquet and Jo-Wilfried Tsonga withdrew due to a right groin injury on Tsonga.

In the Quarterfinals higher ranked temas eclipsed their lower ranked opponents in tight matches with defending champions Daniel Nestor / Nenad Zimonjić, Wesley Moodie / Dick Norman, Simon Aspelin / Paul Hanley all coming through. The upset in the Quarterfinals was when the team of Bob Bryan / Mike Bryan fell to the re-partnership of Mahesh Bhupathi / Max Mirnyi 11–9 in the final set. In the Semifinals it saw defending champions Daniel Nestor and Nenad Zimonjić make quick work of Wesley Moodie & Dick Norman with a 6–0, 6–4 victory. In the other Semifinals it saw 2003 champions Mahesh Bhupathi & Max Mirnyi scrapping through with a 6–3, 7–6(3) victory over Simon Aspelin & Paul Hanley. In the finals it saw top seed and defending champions Daniel Nestor and Nenad Zimonjić defending their title against the team of Mahesh Bhupathi & Max Mirnyi when Bhupathi retired due to a left leg injury at 6–4, 2–0 in favor of the Canadian-Serbian duo. This was Zimonjić's fourth title and Nestors second title in the tournament.

== Entrants ==
=== Seeds ===
| Athlete | Nationality | Ranking* | Seeding |
|---|---|---|---|
| Novak Djokovic | Serbia | 2 | 1 |
| Rafael Nadal | Spain | 3 | 2 |
| Andy Murray | United Kingdom | 4 | 3 |
| Marin Čilić | Croatia | 9 | 4 |
| Jo-Wilfried Tsonga | France | 10 | 5 |
| Fernando Verdasco | Spain | 12 | 6 |
| Mikhail Youzhny | Russia | 13 | 7 |
| Ivan Ljubičić | Croatia | 14 | 8 |
| Juan Carlos Ferrero | Spain | 15 | 9 |
| Tomáš Berdych | Czech Republic | 16 | 10 |
| David Ferrer | Spain | 17 | 11 |
| Tommy Robredo | Spain | 22 | 12 |
| Stanislas Wawrinka | Switzerland | 23 | 13 |
| Juan Mónaco | Argentina | 24 | 14 |
| Jürgen Melzer | Austria | 28 | 15 |
| Marcos Baghdatis | Cyprus | 30 | 16 |

- Rankings and seedings are as of April 5, 2010.

=== Other entrants ===
The following players received wildcards into the main draw:

- (Italy) Simone Bolelli
- (France) Richard Gasquet
- (United Kingdom) Andy Murray
- (Australia) Bernard Tomic

The following player received entry using a protected ranking:

- (Argentina) David Nalbandian

The following players received entry via qualifying:

- (Netherlands) Thiemo de Bakker
- (Ukraine) Oleksandr Dolgopolov Jr.
- (Spain) Daniel Gimeno Traver
- (Kazakhstan) Andrey Golubev
- (Spain) Marcel Granollers
- (Australia) Peter Luczak
- (Finland) Jarkko Nieminen

=== Notable withdrawals ===
The following players withdrew from the tournament for various reasons:

- (Russia) Nikolay Davydenko (wrist injury)
- (Argentina) Juan Martín del Potro (wrist injury)
- (Germany) Tommy Haas (hip surgery)
- (Australia) Lleyton Hewitt
- (Croatia) Ivo Karlović
- (France) Gaël Monfils (hand injury)
- (Spain) Carlos Moyá (foot injury)
- (Sweden) Robin Söderling (knee injury)

== Finals ==
=== Singles ===
(Spain) Rafael Nadal defeated (Spain) Fernando Verdasco, 6–0, 6–1.

- It was Nadal's first title of the year and 37th of his career. It was his 16th Masters 1000 title, and 6th Monte Carlo title, winning six consecutive years.

=== Doubles ===
(Canada) Daniel Nestor / (Serbia) Nenad Zimonjić defeated (India) Mahesh Bhupathi / (Belarus) Max Mirnyi, 6–3, 3–0, ret.
