= 2010 Monte-Carlo Rolex Masters – Singles =

Singles
- 2010 Monte-Carlo Rolex Masters

Final
- Champion: (Spain) Rafael Nadal
- Runner-up: (Spain) Fernando Verdasco
- Score: 6–0, 6–1

Details
- Draw: 56 (7 Q / 3 WC )
- Seeds: 16

Events
Singles	Doubles
- Monte-Carlo Rolex Masters

Five-time defending champion Rafael Nadal defeated Fernando Verdasco in the final, 6–0, 6–1 to win the singles tennis title at the 2010 Monte-Carlo Rolex Masters. It was his first title in eleven months, and he did not lose a set en route to the title. This also marked the first leg of Nadal’s “Clay Slam”—a season sweep of the Monte-Carlo, Rome, Madrid, and French Open clay court tournaments—as well as the start of a 24-match win streak.

== Seeds ==
The top eight seeds receive a bye into the second round.

1. (Serbia) Novak Djokovic (semifinals)
2. (Spain) Rafael Nadal (champion)
3. (United Kingdom) Andy Murray (second round)
4. (Croatia) Marin Čilić (third round)
5. (France) Jo-Wilfried Tsonga (third round)
6. (Spain) Fernando Verdasco (final)
7. (Russia) Mikhail Youzhny (second round)
8. (Croatia) Ivan Ljubičić (third round)
9. (Spain) Juan Carlos Ferrero (quarterfinals)
10. (Czech Republic) Tomáš Berdych (third round)
11. (Spain) David Ferrer (semifinals)
12. (Spain) Tommy Robredo (third round)
13. (Switzerland) Stan Wawrinka (third round)
14. (Argentina) Juan Mónaco (second round)
15. (Austria) Jürgen Melzer (second round)
16. (Cyprus) Marcos Baghdatis (first round)

== Draw ==
Key

- Q = Qualifier
- WC = Wild card
- LL = Lucky loser
- Alt = Alternate
- ITF = ITF entry
- PR = Protected ranking
- SR = Special ranking
- SE = Special exempt
- JE = Junior exempt
- JR = Junior Accelerator Programme entrant
- CO = College Accelerator Programme entrant
- NG = Next Gen Accelerator Program entrant
- w/o = Walkover
- r = Retired
- d = Defaulted

=== Finals ===
Quarterfinals
1	(Serbia) Novak Djokovic	6	6
PR	(Argentina) David Nalbandian	2	3
(Spain) Albert Montañés	3	7^{7}	0
6	(Spain) Fernando Verdasco	6	6^{4}	6
11	(Spain) David Ferrer	7	7^{7}
(Germany) Philipp Kohlschreiber	5	6^{1}
9	(Spain) Juan Carlos Ferrero	4	2
2	(Spain) Rafael Nadal	6	6

Semifinals
1	(Serbia) Novak Djokovic	2	2
6	(Spain) Fernando Verdasco	6	6
11	(Spain) David Ferrer	2	3
2	(Spain) Rafael Nadal	6	6

Final
6	(Spain) Fernando Verdasco	0	1
2	(Spain) Rafael Nadal	6	6

=== Top half ===
==== Section 1 ====
First round
(France) F Serra	7^{8}	3	6
(France) S Robert	6^{6}	6	4
(Latvia) E Gulbis	6	6
(Switzerland) M Chiudinelli	3	2
(Romania) V Hănescu	2	4
13	(Switzerland) S Wawrinka	6	6
12	(Spain) T Robredo	6	6
(Argentina) H Zeballos	3	3
(Serbia) V Troicki	4	6	6
(Poland) Ł Kubot	6	2	2
PR	(Argentina) D Nalbandian	6	6
(Germany) A Beck	3	1

Second round
1	(Serbia) N Djokovic	6	6
(France) F Serra	2	3
(Latvia) E Gulbis	1	4
13	(Switzerland) S Wawrinka	6	6
12	(Spain) T Robredo	6	6
(Serbia) V Troicki	4	3
PR	(Argentina) D Nalbandian	4	6	7^{7}
7	(Russia) M Youzhny	6	3	6^{5}

Third round
1	(Serbia) N Djokovic	6	6
13	(Switzerland) S Wawrinka	4	4
12	(Spain) T Robredo	3	4
PR	(Argentina) D Nalbandian	6	6

Quarterfinals
1	(Serbia) N Djokovic	6	6
PR	(Argentina) D Nalbandian	2	3

==== Section 2 ====
First round
(Russia) I Andreev	6	6
WC	(Italy) S Bolelli	3	4
(Belgium) O Rochus	6^{3}	0^{r}
(Italy) A Seppi	7^{7}	0
(Spain) A Montañés	6	6
16	(Cyprus) M Baghdatis	4	2
10	(Czech Republic) T Berdych	6	6
(Spain) F López	3	1
Q	(Spain) D Gimeno Traver	2	6	2
WC	(France) R Gasquet	6	4	6
(France) J Benneteau	6	5	6
Q	(Ukraine) O Dolgopolov Jr.	4	7	2

Second round
4	(Croatia) M Čilić	6^{4}	6	6
(Russia) I Andreev	7^{7}	1	4
(Italy) A Seppi	6^{1}	6	0
(Spain) A Montañés	7^{7}	3	6
10	(Czech Republic) T Berdych	6	6
WC	(France) R Gasquet	2	0
(France) J Benneteau	2	1
6	(Spain) F Verdasco	6	6

Third round
4	(Croatia) M Čilić	4	4
(Spain) A Montañés	6	6
10	(Czech Republic) T Berdych	7	3	2
6	(Spain) F Verdasco	5	6	6

Quarterfinals
(Spain) A Montañés	3	7^{7}	0
6	(Spain) F Verdasco	6	6^{4}	6

=== Bottom half ===
==== Section 3 ====
First round
(Italy) F Fognini	3	3
(France) M Llodra	6	6
(France) J Chardy	2	6^{2}
Q	(Kazakhstan) A Golubev	6	7^{7}
Q	(Australia) P Luczak	2	4
11	(Spain) D Ferrer	6	6
15	(Austria) J Melzer	6	6
(France) P-H Mathieu	3	2
(Spain) G García López	3	6	2
(Germany) P Petzschner	6	2	6
(Brazil) T Bellucci	6	3	6^{3}
(Germany) P Kohlschreiber	2	6	7^{7}

Second round
8	(Croatia) I Ljubičić	6	7^{7}
(France) M Llodra	3	6^{3}
Q	(Kazakhstan) A Golubev	3	2
11	(Spain) D Ferrer	6	6
15	(Austria) J Melzer	6^{4}	2
(Germany) P Petzschner	7^{7}	6
(Germany) P Kohlschreiber	6	6
3/WC	(United Kingdom) A Murray	2	1

Third round
8	(Croatia) I Ljubičić	0	6^{4}
11	(Spain) D Ferrer	6	7^{7}
(Germany) P Petzschner	3	4
(Germany) P Kohlschreiber	6	6

Quarterfinals
11	(Spain) D Ferrer	7	7^{7}
(Germany) P Kohlschreiber	5	6^{1}

==== Section 4 ====
First round
(Spain) N Almagro	3	7	6
(Germany) S Greul	6	5	2
WC	(Australia) B Tomic	4	2
(Germany) B Becker	6	6
Q	(Spain) M Granollers	0	3
9	(Spain) JC Ferrero	6	6
14	(Argentina) J Mónaco	7	7
Q	(Finland) J Nieminen	5	5
(Germany) M Berrer	6	6
(Kazakhstan) E Korolev	1	4
Q	(Netherlands) T de Bakker	6	7
(Argentina) E Schwank	3	5

Second round
5	(France) J-W Tsonga	7^{7}	7
(Spain) N Almagro	6^{5}	5
(Germany) B Becker	3	4
9	(Spain) JC Ferrero	6	6
14	(Argentina) J Mónaco	4	4
(Germany) M Berrer	6	6
Q	(Netherlands) T de Bakker	1	0
2	(Spain) R Nadal	6	6

Third round
5	(France) J-W Tsonga	1	6	5
9	(Spain) JC Ferrero	6	3	7
(Germany) M Berrer	0	1
2	(Spain) R Nadal	6	6

Quarterfinals
9	(Spain) JC Ferrero	4	2
2	(Spain) R Nadal	6	6

== Qualifying ==
=== Seeds ===
1. (Ukraine) Sergiy Stakhovsky (first round)
2. (Ukraine) Alexandr Dolgopolov (qualified)
3. (Finland) Jarkko Nieminen (qualified)
4. (Australia) Peter Luczak (qualified)
5. (Netherlands) Thiemo de Bakker (qualified)
6. (Ukraine) Illya Marchenko (first round)
7. (France) Arnaud Clément (qualifying competition)
8. (Spain) Óscar Hernández (qualifying competition)
9. (Germany) Mischa Zverev (qualifying competition)
10. (Spain) Marcel Granollers (qualified)
11. (Kazakhstan) Andrey Golubev (qualified)
12. (Spain) Daniel Gimeno Traver (qualified)
13. (Russia) Igor Kunitsyn (qualifying competition)
14. (Russia) Teymuraz Gabashvili (qualifying competition)

=== Qualifiers ===
1. (Spain) Daniel Gimeno Traver
2. (Ukraine) Alexandr Dolgopolov
3. (Finland) Jarkko Nieminen
4. (Australia) Peter Luczak
5. (Netherlands) Thiemo de Bakker
6. (Spain) Marcel Granollers
7. (Kazakhstan) Andrey Golubev

=== Draw ===
==== First qualifier ====
First round
1	(Ukraine) Sergiy Stakhovsky	6	3	4
(Spain) Iván Navarro	3	6	6
WC	(Monaco) Thomas Oger	3	1
12	(Spain) Daniel Gimeno Traver	6	6

Qualifying competition
(Spain) Iván Navarro	6	6^{6}	0
12	(Spain) Daniel Gimeno Traver	2	7^{8}	6

==== Second qualifier ====
First round
2	(Ukraine) Alexandr Dolgopolov	6	6
(Spain) Santiago Ventura Bertomeu	4	4
(France) David Guez	6^{7}	4
9	(Germany) Mischa Zverev	7^{9}	6

Qualifying competition
2	(Ukraine) Alexandr Dolgopolov	6	6
9	(Germany) Mischa Zverev	3	4

==== Third qualifier ====
First round
3	(Finland) Jarkko Nieminen	7	6
WC	(Ukraine) Sergei Bubka	5	2
(Croatia) Ivan Dodig	6	3	3
8	(Spain) Óscar Hernández	2	6	6

Qualifying competition
3	(Finland) Jarkko Nieminen	6	6
8	(Spain) Óscar Hernández	3	3

==== Fourth qualifier ====
First round
4	(Australia) Peter Luczak	6^{3}	6	6
(Austria) Stefan Koubek	7^{7}	3	3
(France) Édouard Roger-Vasselin	6^{2}	3
13	(Russia) Igor Kunitsyn	7^{7}	6

Qualifying competition
4	(Australia) Peter Luczak	6	6
13	(Russia) Igor Kunitsyn	1	2

==== Fifth qualifier ====
First round
5	(Netherlands) Thiemo de Bakker	6	7
(Spain) Alberto Martín	2	5
Alt	(Switzerland) George Bastl	2	2
14	(Russia) Teymuraz Gabashvili	6	6

Qualifying competition
5	(Netherlands) Thiemo de Bakker	6	7
14	(Russia) Teymuraz Gabashvili	4	5

==== Sixth qualifier ====
First round
6	(Ukraine) Illya Marchenko	2	4
WC	(Monaco) Benjamin Balleret	6	6
(France) Josselin Ouanna	1	5
10	(Spain) Marcel Granollers	6	7

Qualifying competition
WC	(Monaco) Benjamin Balleret	4	7^{7}	3
10	(Spain) Marcel Granollers	6	6^{5}	6

==== Seventh qualifier ====
First round
7	(France) Arnaud Clément	5	7	6
WC	(Ukraine) Artem Smirnov	7	5	2
(Portugal) Fred Gil	6	6^{4}	6^{4}
11	(Kazakhstan) Andrey Golubev	3	7^{7}	7^{7}

Qualifying competition
7	(France) Arnaud Clément	1	2
11	(Kazakhstan) Andrey Golubev	6	6
