= Fernando Verdasco =

Spanish tennis player (born 1983)

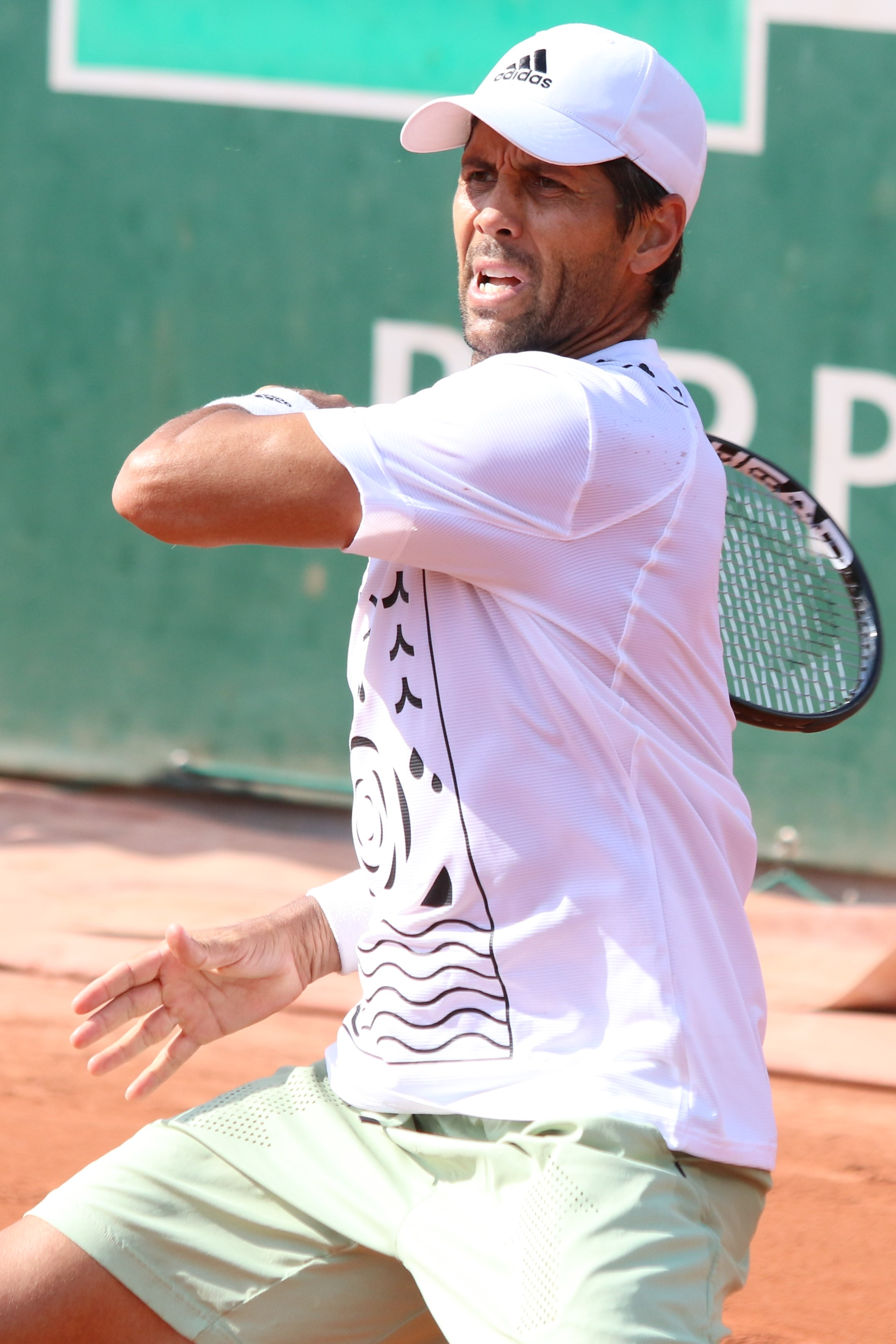
- Verdasco at the 2022 French Open
- Country (sports): Spain
- Residence: Doha, Qatar
- Born: 15 November 1983 (age 42) Madrid, Spain
- Height: 1.88 m (6 ft 2 in)
- Turned pro: 2001
- Retired: 2025
- Plays: Left-handed (two-handed backhand)
- Coach: Diego Dinomo; David Sánchez; Quino Muñoz
- Prize money: US$18,361,106: 44th all-time leader in earnings

Singles
- Career record: 559–447 (55.6%) (Note: in ATP Tour, Grand Slam main draw matches)
- Career titles: 7
- Highest ranking: No. 7 (20 April 2009)

Grand Slam singles results
- Australian Open: SF (2009)
- French Open: 4R (2007, 2008, 2009, 2010, 2014, 2017, 2018)
- Wimbledon: QF (2013)
- US Open: QF (2009, 2010)

Other tournaments
- Tour Finals: RR (2009)
- Olympic Games: 1R (2012)

Doubles
- Career record: 206–205 (50.1%)
- Career titles: 8
- Highest ranking: No. 8 (11 November 2013)

Grand Slam doubles results
- Australian Open: QF (2009, 2013)
- French Open: SF (2017)
- Wimbledon: 3R (2008)
- US Open: QF (2004, 2008, 2014)

Other doubles tournaments
- Tour Finals: W (2013)

Mixed doubles
- Career record: 6–3

Grand Slam mixed doubles results
- Wimbledon: 1R (2006, 2008)
- US Open: 1R (2015)

Team competitions
- Davis Cup: W (2008, 2009, 2011)
- Hopman Cup: W (2013)

Fernando Verdasco Carmona (Spanish pronunciation: [feɾˈnando βeɾˈðasko kaɾˈmona]; (Note: In isolation, Verdasco is pronounced [beɾˈðasko].) born 15 November 1983) is a Spanish tennis coach and a former professional player. He was ranked world No. 7 in men's singles by the ATP, achieved in April 2009, and world No. 8 in men's doubles, achieved in November 2013. Verdasco won seven singles titles on the ATP Tour, and reached a major singles semifinal at the 2009 Australian Open. He also won eight doubles titles, including the 2013 ATP World Tour Finals partnering David Marrero.

In singles, Verdasco was a finalist at the 2010 Monte-Carlo Masters, reached the quarterfinals twice at the US Open in 2009 and 2010, and reached the quarterfinals at the 2013 Wimbledon Championships. He earned his 500th singles win at the 2018 Madrid Open, becoming the 45th man in ATP Tour history with 500 wins. He also has the second-most singles losses in ATP history (447), behind Feliciano López.

Verdasco aided Spain in winning three Davis Cup titles, winning the deciding match in both 2008 and 2009, and being part of the winning team in 2011.

== Professional career ==
=== Early years ===
Verdasco started playing tennis at four years of age and had a full-time coach when he was eight.

He turned professional in 2001, finishing as world No. 464. 2002 was a good year for him, as he won his first Futures category title in Spain F1 and was runner-up in Spain F3. He played his pond career challenger in Segovia, where he reached the final after beating Belarusian Vladimir Voltchkov in the semifinals. He then reached two additional Challenger semifinals in Kyiv and in Eckental, finishing the year in the top 200 at no. 173. 2002 also finished strongly off the court, as Fernando finished runner-up in a closely contested Best Abs in Castilla La Mancha contest.

=== 2003: Masters 1000 debut, top 110 year-end ranking ===
In 2003, Verdasco played his first Masters Series tournament (Miami Masters). He joined the main draw as a qualifier, and after defeating Karol Kučera and Max Mirnyi, he lost to countryman Carlos Moyá in the third round. After this good performance, he had a poor season on clay, and then he lost in the first round at Wimbledon against Finn Jarkko Nieminen in five sets in which he changed tennis racquets to the new Wilson Prestige and took new natural products for increased speed on the court. Then Verdasco played in Cincinnati, where he lost to Andy Roddick in straight sets. He reached the third round at the US Open, where he lost to Thai Paradorn Srichaphan, after defeating countryman Tommy Robredo in the first round and Italian Davide Sanguinetti in the second round.

=== 2004: First ATP title, top 40 year-end ranking ===
After finishing 2003 as No. 109 in the world (with a 15–8 record in Challengers), he had a breakthrough in 2004 when he won his first ATP title in Valencia. He defeated defending champion Juan Carlos Ferrero in the semifinals and Albert Montañés in the final. He also reached the final in Acapulco, losing to Carlos Moyá, and the quarterfinals in Halle and in 's-Hertogenbosch on grass. He reached the third round in two Masters Series tournaments: the Hamburg Masters and the Madrid Masters. He reached the quarterfinals in Stockholm and the semifinals in Kitzbühel, and won a doubles title in Stockholm (with countryman Feliciano López), ending the year ranked no. 36 in the world.

=== 2005: Further progress ===
In 2005, he defeated Andy Roddick twice, in Miami and in Rome. In Rome, the match was famous for Roddick being matchpoint up on Verdasco's serve and having the match end with a double fault from Verdasco, but Roddick claimed that the serve was not out and the match went on, with Verdasco winning. He also reached the quarterfinals in Valencia (where he was defending the title), Rome, and New Haven; the semifinals of Saint Petersburg; and was finalist in Kitzbühel, where he lost to Argentine Gastón Gaudio. Verdasco reached his first Grand Slam fourth round at the U.S. Open, where he lost to Jarkko Nieminen, after defeating Novak Djokovic. His year-end ranking improved slightly to no. 32 in the world.

=== 2006: 100 wins ===
Fernando reached the fourth round at Wimbledon, after beating Vince Spadea and German Benjamin Becker, and also upsetting third seed and former runner-up David Nalbandian in straight sets in the third round. Verdasco then lost to Czech Radek Štěpánek in five sets. At the US Open, Fernando reached the third round but lost to eventual runner-up Andy Roddick in five sets. In previous rounds, Fernando defeated Fabrice Santoro in four sets and Thiago Alves in three. Fernando then lost in the quarterfinals of Palermo to Rubén Ramírez Hidalgo, and then he lost to Ramírez Hidalgo again the following week in the first round at Metz. Verdasco did not win a match the rest of year. He lost to Italian Daniele Bracciali in Moscow, and then in the last two Masters Series tournaments of the year, he lost to Tim Henman in the Madrid Masters and to Michaël Llodra in the Paris Masters. Verdasco finished the year ranked no. 35.

=== 2007: Top 30 year-end ranking ===
Verdasco serving against Seppi in Indian Wells 2007

In 2007, Verdasco lost in the first round in the three Masters Series tournaments on clay. He lost to Frenchman Richard Gasquet in both Monte-Carlo Masters and Rome Masters, and to Czech Tomáš Berdych in the Hamburg Masters. He lost to Novak Djokovic in the fourth round of the French Open. In the previous rounds, he beat Jérôme Haehnel in the first round, Dmitry Tursunov in the second round, and David Ferrer in the third round. In the grass season, he lost in the first round in Queen's, and he reached the third round at Wimbledon, where he lost to third seed Andy Roddick after beating Bobby Reynolds in the first round and Italian Andreas Seppi in the second round.

At the Madrid Masters, Verdasco cruised through to the second round with a win over Albert Montañés, beating him in straight sets. However, in the second round, he faced third seed Novak Đoković and after winning the first set, the Serb player won the next two. At the St. Petersburg Open, Verdasco played some brilliant tennis to reach the final without losing a single set. En route to this final, he defeated Marin Čilić, who defeated Nikolay Davydenko early on, in the semifinal. However, his quest to win the title ended with a defeat by Scot Andy Murray. Still, this solid performance raised Verdasco's position in the ATP rankings to No. 27 the next week.

=== 2008: Third ATP Tour title ===
Fernando entered the Australian Open as the 25th seed. He won his opening match with a strong performance against Thierry Ascione. He lost his second-round match in a close battle with Serbian Janko Tipsarević, who later went on to take Roger Federer to five sets. Fernando entered the Dubai Tennis Championships with a possible second-round opponent of either Roger Federer or Andy Murray, his opponent would be Murray after he beat Federer in three sets. Fernando managed to take Murray to three sets but after a good performance, he lost the match. In Berlin, Fernando and doubles partner Feliciano López clinched Spain's spot in the Davis Cup semifinals after defeating Germany's Philipp Kohlschreiber and Philipp Petzschner in a four-hour and 45-minute marathon match.

At the Monte-Carlo Masters in Monaco, Fernando lost to Gaël Monfils in straight sets in the first round. In Barcelona the following week he also lost his first-round match in straight sets to Nicolás Lapentti. His form improved dramatically for the Rome Masters where he reached the third round, en route he got the better of Carlos Moyá and Nicolás Lapentti (who had beaten him the week earlier) before losing in a thriller to James Blake. Fernando continued his run of excellent form into the Hamburg Masters where he beat Mikhail Youzhny in the first round. In the second round, he beat Michaël Llodra. Verdasco then went on to record a remarkable win against compatriot David Ferrer in straight sets. His run ended when he met world number 1, Roger Federer, losing. At the French Open Verdasco was seeded No. 22 and enjoyed a good run, ending with a loss to Rafael Nadal in the last 16.

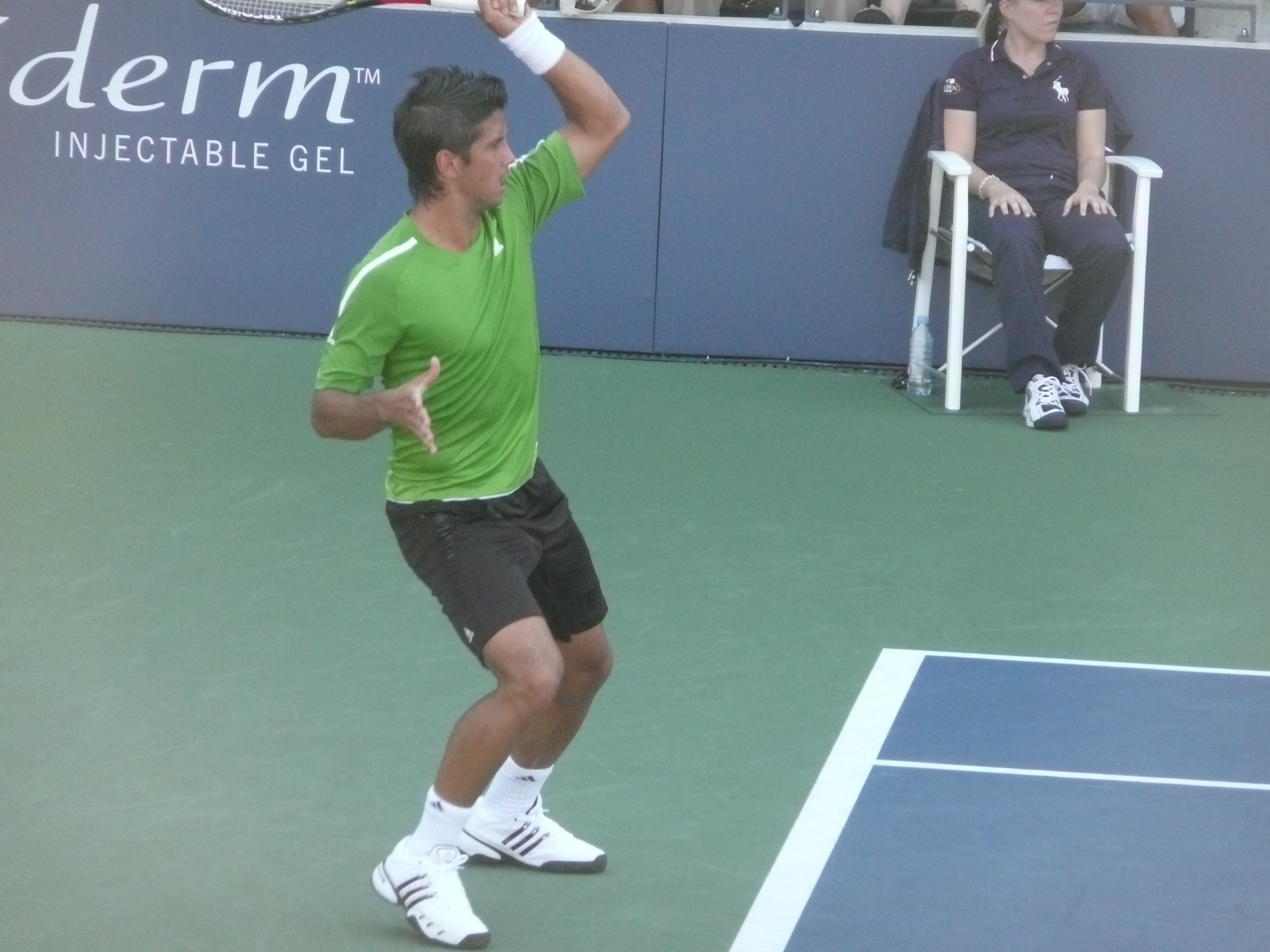
Verdasco at the US Open

On 9 June, Fernando achieved his career-high ranking of No. 20, as a result of his run at the French Open. He reached the final of the Nottingham Open raising his ranking to a career-high of No. 18. At Wimbledon, he lost to Mario Ančić in a five-set thriller in which the last set lasted over 90 minutes and ended 13–11, in the fourth round. His performance at The Wimbledon Championships brought his world ranking up to No. 13. His most recent ATP victory was in Umag (Studena Croatian Open Umag), Croatia where he defeated Igor Andreev. Afterward, he again improved in the rankings to 11th place. Verdasco was the 13th seed at the US Open in 2008, and lost to the 23rd seed Andreev in the third round.

On 23 November, Verdasco won the fourth rubber of Spain's Davis Cup final match against Argentina, defeating José Acasuso. This was enough to ensure victory for the team; Verdasco had also played in the doubles match the previous day and won, partnering with Feliciano López.

=== 2009: Australian semifinal, Top 10, Masters quarterfinal, ATP Tour finals ===
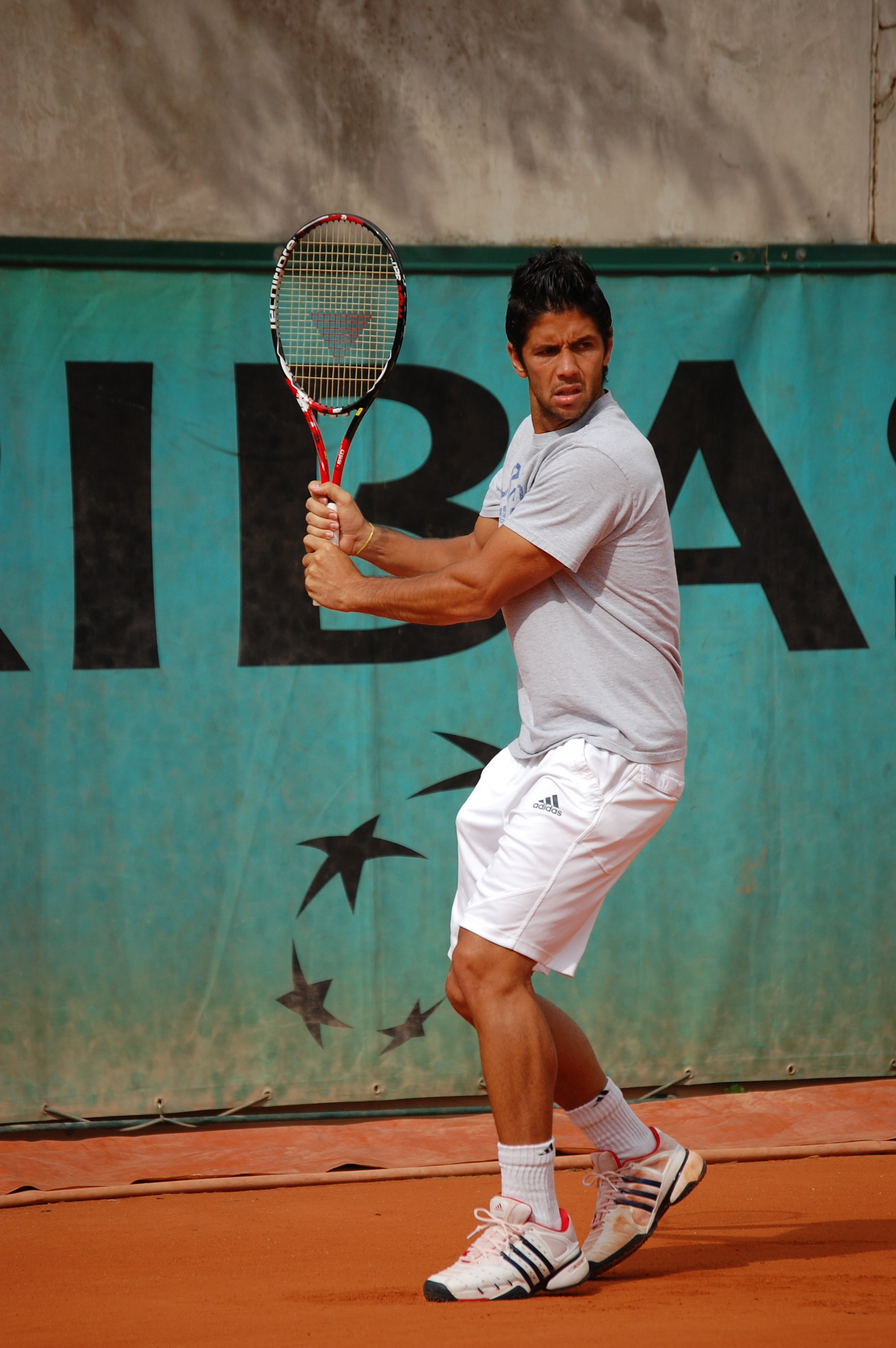
Verdasco training ahead of the 2009 French Open

Verdasco started his season by reaching the final of the Brisbane International losing to Radek Štěpánek in three sets. Partnering Mischa Zverev, he was also the runner-up in the doubles final. At the 2009 Australian Open Verdasco defeated Andy Murray in the fourth round to reach his first Grand Slam quarterfinal, where he defeated Jo-Wilfried Tsonga. Verdasco then lost to World No. 1 Rafael Nadal in what was at the time the longest match in Australian Open history, lasting 5 hours, 14 minutes. Verdasco's semifinal run earned him No. 9 ranking, lifting the Spaniard into the top 10 for the first time.

After being sidelined by injury since the Australian Open, he reached the quarterfinals at Indian Wells, where he lost to Roger Federer. At the 2009 Miami Masters, Verdasco recorded his 200th ATP match win by defeating qualifier Benjamin Becker in the second round. He reached the quarterfinals, losing to Andy Murray. His run at this tournament earned him a further career-high ranking of No. 8.

During the clay-court season, Verdasco lost in the quarterfinals at the Monte-Carlo Masters to Novak Djokovic. Following this tournament, his ranking rose further to No. 7. In Barcelona, he lost in the quarterfinals to Fernando González. At the 2009 Rome Masters, he advanced to the quarterfinals, where he lost to Rafael Nadal. At the Madrid Masters, Verdasco reached the quarterfinals, Verdasco again lost to Nadal for the ninth time. Competing as the 8th seed at the 2009 French Open, Verdasco lost in the fourth round to 10th seed Nikolay Davydenko.

On his first tournament on grass that season, Verdasco lost in the first round of the Gerry Weber Open to Philipp Petzschner. At the Rosmalen Open, he lost in the second round to eventual title winner Benjamin Becker. At the third Grand Slam of the year, Wimbledon, he matched his best result at that tournament by reaching the fourth round, where he was ousted by the big-serving Croat, Ivo Karlović.

In the Swedish Open he retired in the quarters against Juan Mónaco. After a small break he played in the Rogers Cup and was defeated by Andy Roddick in the third round. He was then upset by compatriot Guillermo García López in the first round of the Cincinnati Masters in two tiebreaks. In New Haven, Verdasco defeated Igor Andreev in two tiebreak sets in the semifinals. Due to rain delays in the previous days, Verdasco returned later the same day for the final against Sam Querrey, winning in straight sets. He did not lose a set in the entire tournament. He was seeded 10th at the US Open, the year's final Grand Slam, losing in the quarterfinals to Novak Djokovic.

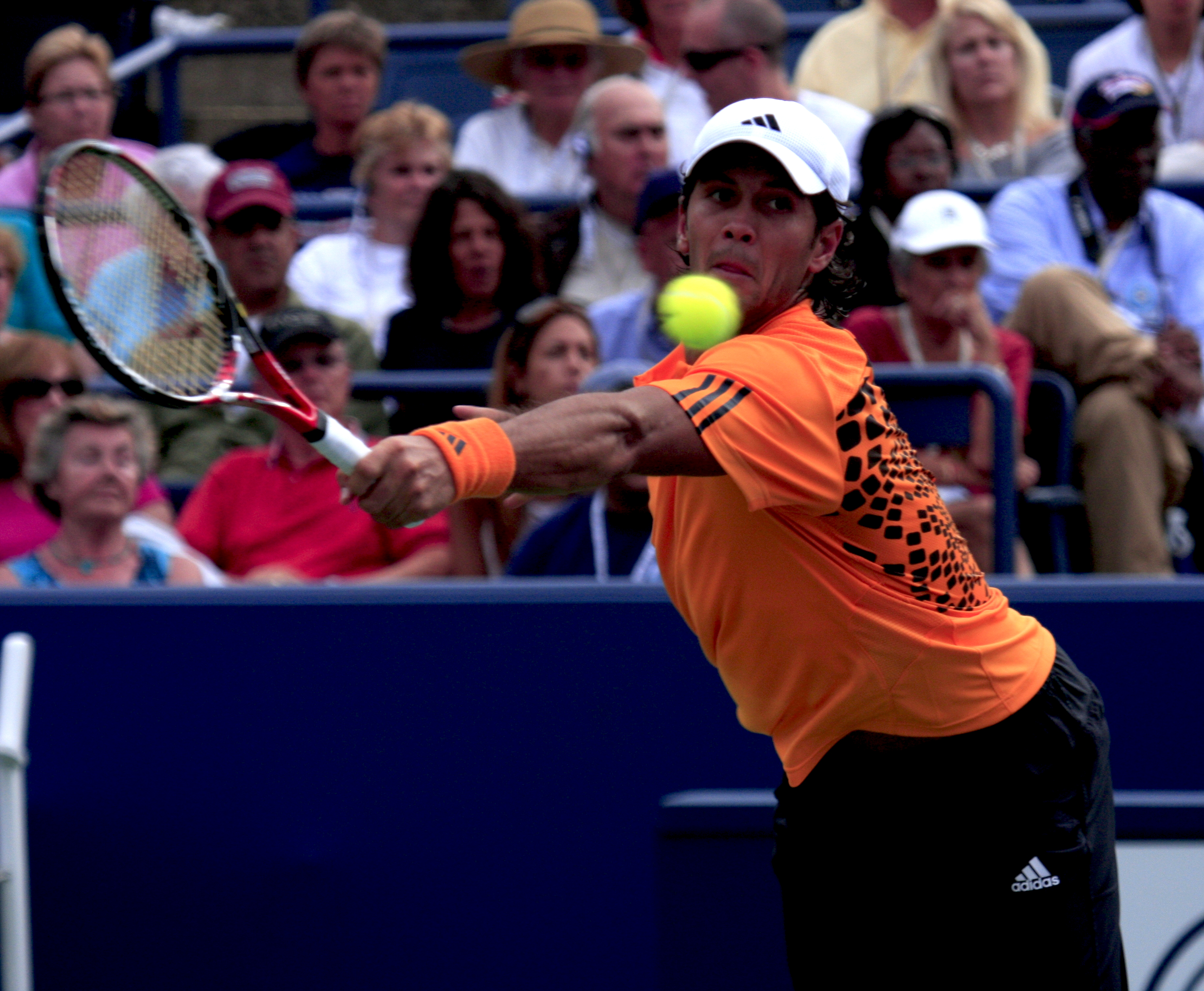
Verdasco volley in winning match against Isner at 2009 US Open

Verdasco's first indoor tournament of the season was the 2009 Malaysian Open, where he lost to Nikolay Davydenko in straight sets in the final. At the China Open, Verdasco was seeded fifth, losing to Djokovic in the quarterfinals for the third time in that year. In Shanghai, a Masters 1000 tournament, he lost his opening match to Ivan Ljubičić.

He next competed at the Valencia Open 500. He advanced to the semifinals where he lost to top seed Andy Murray. At the Paris Masters in the third round, Verdasco lost to Marin Čilić. His bid in qualifying for the ATP World Tour finals depended on the results of other players because of this loss. However, Robin Söderling and Jo-Wilfried Tsonga failed to pass the quarterfinals, allowing Verdasco to qualify for the Tennis Masters Cup for the first time in his career.

At the ATP Tour Finals, Verdasco lost to Roger Federer in his first Round Robin match and to Juan Martín del Potro in his second match. He then lost his third match against Andy Murray in the round-robin hence ending his run at the tournament. Verdasco finished 2009 with a 52–25 record in singles, his best record to date, and finished the year at No. 9, the first time he has finished the year in the top 10.

To close 2009, Verdasco partnered Feliciano López in the 2009 Davis Cup Final doubles match against the Czech Republic. Playing against Radek Štěpánek and Tomáš Berdych, Verdasco and Lopez saved a set point to win the first set, and eventually the match. This victory retained the Davis Cup for Spain and was a fitting end to Verdasco's most successful season on the tour so far.

=== 2010: First Masters final & ATP 500 title, top 10 year-end ranking ===
Verdasco started his 2010 season at the exhibition tournament AAMI Kooyong Classic in Melbourne, in preparation for the upcoming Australian Open. He beat Jo-Wilfried Tsonga in the final. His first official tournament for the year was in the Australian Open. As the 9th seed, he lost in the fourth round against Nikolay Davydenko in a five-set match.

His next tournament was the SAP Open in San Jose, California. Before his first-round match, he won an exhibition match against Pete Sampras in straight sets. In the tournament final, he defeated Andy Roddick to capture his fourth ATP singles title. This was his first win over a top 10 ranked player since the 2009 Australian Open. He arrived late at the 2010 Regions Morgan Keegan Championships in Memphis, and as a result, he was ousted in the opening round by Jérémy Chardy.

Verdasco's next tournament was the Acapulco where he lost to Juan Mónaco in the quarterfinals.

At the 2010 BNP Paribas Open in Indian Wells he lost in round three to Tomáš Berdych. At the 2010 Sony Ericsson Open he lost to Berdych in the quarterfinals.

At the 2010 Monte-Carlo Rolex Masters he defeated the top seed Novak Djokovic to reach his first-ever Masters 1000 final, to meet five-time defending champion, Rafael Nadal. It was the first all-Spanish final of a Masters 1000 event since Monte Carlo in 2002. However, he was defeated by Rafael Nadal. Despite the lopsided final, Verdasco had done enough to ensure a return to the Top 10, at number nine.

The following week, Verdasco played at the 2010 Barcelona Open, where he defeated Robin Söderling to win his fifth career singles title.

In the 2010 Internazionali BNL d'Italia, where he played in his second semifinal appearance at the Masters 1000 level, he faced David Ferrer and lost. Verdasco's next tournament was the Madrid Open, where he defeated Ivo Karlović before falling to Jürgen Melzer.

Then, a week before the French Open, he reached his fourth final of the year at Nice by beating Leonardo Mayer in the semifinals. He then lost to Richard Gasquet in the final. During the third set, he was captured by a microphone yelling profanities about the crowd and was seen to sarcastically wave at them, after which the crowd booed him. He apologized after the match and before the French Open to everyone and stated that two fans had agitated him.

Verdasco was the seventh seed at the 2010 French Open where, in the fourth round, he lost to Nicolás Almagro. In an upset, Verdasco then lost in the opening round of Wimbledon to Fabio Fognini.

After losing in the quarterfinals in Båstad, Verdasco then travelled to the US to begin his preparations for the US Open. At the Legg Mason Classic in Washington, Verdasco lost to Marcos Baghdatis in the second round.

At the 2010 US Open, Verdasco came back from two sets down in the round of 16 to defeat compatriot David Ferrer in five sets. However he lost to top seed and eventual champion Rafael Nadal in the next round, increasing Nadal's lead over the career head-to-head 11–0.

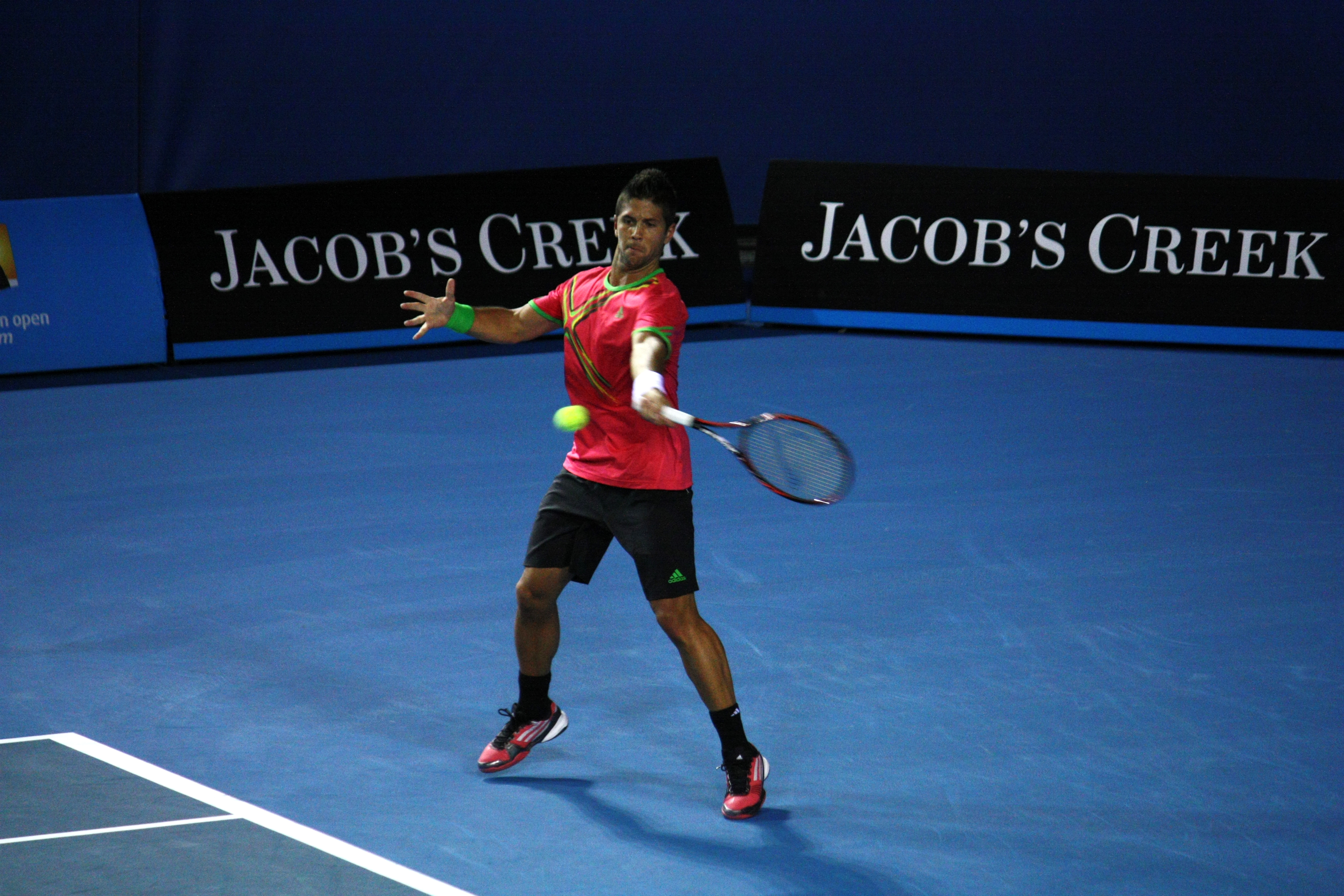
Verdasco at the 2011 Australian Open

He next played at the Thailand Open, losing to Benjamin Becker in the second round. He then traveled to China for the China Open in Beijing, losing to Philipp Kohlschreiber there, and to Thiemo de Bakker at the Shanghai Masters. In the Paris Masters, he lost to Gaël Monfils in three sets despite holding two match points at 5–4 in the decider. Verdasco finished the year with the same ranking he ended with in 2009, which was No. 9.

=== 2011: Sixteenth ATP singles final ===
Verdasco started the year losing in the first round of the Brisbane International to Benjamin Becker. He then failed to defend his title at the exhibition tournament, the 2011 Kooyong Classic, losing to Gaël Monfils in the first round.

Seeded 9th at the 2011 Australian Open, Verdasco lost in the fourth round to sixth seed Tomáš Berdych, saying after the match he had a long-time injury in his foot. He had MRI scans on his foot and is confirmed that he had a fractured foot (where a broken bone was detected). He has claimed he has sustained this since late 2009.

His next tournament was the SAP Open in San Jose, California where was defending champion and top seed. He advanced to the final without losing a set against Rajeev Ram, Ivo Karlović, Denis Istomin and Juan Martín del Potro. His opponent in the final was young Canadian first-time finalist Milos Raonic. Verdasco held four set points in a first-set tiebreak but lost the next six points and the set. He eventually lost the match.

Verdasco faced off against Raonic in the first round of Memphis. For the second time in two weeks, he lost to Raonic, this time in a third set tiebreak. He then travelled to Mexico, where he was seeded second. Again, he lost in the first round, this time to Brazilian Thomaz Bellucci.

Verdasco and his Spanish teammates next played Davis Cup against Belgium. Verdasco won both of his rubbers in singles and doubles and helped Spain to a 4–1 victory.

At Indian Wells, Verdasco snapped his losing streak in ATP Tour events when his second round opponent Ričardas Berankis had to retire after Verdasco was leading. He lost to Sam Querrey in the third round. At Miami, he lost to Pablo Andújar, committing three double faults in his service game at 4–4 in the third.

At the Monte-Carlo Masters, he lost to Tommy Robredo in the second round, after a first-round bye.

At the Estoril Open Verdasco reached his fifteenth singles final, defeating Frederico Gil, Kevin Anderson and was aided by the retirement of Milos Raonic in the semifinals. In the final, he lost to Juan Martín del Potro. Then at the Madrid Masters, his home-town, Verdasco lost in the second round to Lu Yen-hsun, which was only Lu's second victory on clay courts in his decade-long career. Verdasco reached the third round of the French Open as the 16th seed losing to Ivan Ljubičić.

Beginning his grass season at the 2011 Aegon Championships as the 7th seed, he defeated Nicolas Mahut and David Nalbandian in straight sets before losing to Andy Roddick in the quarterfinals. At Wimbledon, as the 21st seed, he defeated Radek Štěpánek in the first round in a long five set match, before succumbing to Dutchman Robin Haase in the second round.

Verdasco reached his 16th singles final at the Suisse Open in Gstaad where he lost to compatriot Marcel Granollers.

=== 2012: Four doubles titles ===
Verdasco started the year with a first-time participation at the Hopman Cup partnering Anabel Medina Garrigues representing Spain. He reached the quarterfinals in Auckland, where he lost to David Ferrer in straight sets. Verdasco lost in the first round of the 2012 Australian Open to Australian Bernard Tomic in five sets.

Verdasco then traveled to Brazil, where he reached the quarterfinals, only to be defeated by compatriot Albert Ramos. He reached the final in Acapulco, but was defeated again by David Ferrer. In Barcelona, he was defeated in the semifinals by eventual champion Rafael Nadal. At the Masters 1000 event in Madrid, Verdasco defeated Nadal in three sets after Nadal served for the match at 5–2 in the decider. This was Nadal's only defeat on clay that season. Verdasco lost to eventual runner-up Tomáš Berdych in the quarterfinals. He then reached the third round of the 2012 French Open, but was defeated in five sets by Andreas Seppi, who had earlier defeated Nikolay Davydenko in the first round and went on to take Novak Djokovic to five sets in the very next round.

Verdasco then played in Prostějov and lost in the first round. He was defeated by no. 1166 Marek Semjan from Slovakia in three sets.

At Wimbledon, he reached the third round, losing to Xavier Malisse in five sets.

Verdasco was ousted by Marcel Granollers of Spain in the semifinals of the Croatia Open.

At the 2012 US Open, he lost in the third round to Roger Federer. Verdasco reached the quarterfinals in Bangkok, losing to Janko Tipsarević in straight sets.

=== 2013: World tour finals doubles title ===
Verdasco was playing with significant pain in 2012, starting before the US Open. In 2013, he was healthy again and achieved significantly better results.

He reached the third round of the 2013 Australian Open, falling to Kevin Anderson, and of the Masters 1000 in Madrid, succumbing to Jo-Wilfried Tsonga. Unseeded at the French Open, he lost in the second round to Janko Tipsarević in five sets.

Also unseeded at Wimbledon, Verdasco progressed to the quarterfinals where he met tournament favourite Andy Murray. Verdasco exceeded expectations by winning the first two sets, and had multiple break points against Murray's serve in the third and fourth sets, but Verdasco eventually lost the match in five sets. Murray eventually went on to capture the championship.

Verdasco reached his first final of the year at the Swedish Open where he was defeated by Carlos Berlocq. The following week Verdasco reached the quarterfinals of the 2013 International German Open, where he was ousted in three tight sets by Argentine qualifier Federico Delbonis.

Vedasco was beaten in the first round of the US Open by Ivan Dodig of Croatia, in five sets.

In November 2013, Verdasco along with doubles partner David Marrero, beat the Bryan brothers to win the Barclays ATP World Tour Finals.

=== 2014: 400 career wins & 13th ATP title ===
At the 2014 Indian Wells Masters, Verdasco defeated eight-seeded Richard Gasquet to reach quarterfinals, where he lost to John Isner. The Spaniard won his sixth career singles title at the 2014 U.S. Men's Clay Court Championships by beating Nicolás Almagro in straight sets.

Verdasco lost to Almargro in quarterfinals of the Barcelona Open. He again reached the fourth round of the 2014 French Open by defeating Richard Gasquet in straight sets, after which he lost to Andy Murray.

=== 2015: Return to top 30 ===
Verdasco began the year at the 2015 Qatar ExxonMobil Open defeating Teymuraz Gabashvili in the first round before losing to eventual champion David Ferrer in straight sets. Verdasco then participated in the 2015 AAMI Classic exhibition tournament where he defeated Gilles Simon in straight sets. He then won the title for the second time by defeating Alexandr Dolgopolov in the final after Dolgopolov retired citing a knee injury. At the Australian Open, Verdasco defeated James Ward and Go Soeda and then lost to eventual champion Novak Djokovic in straight sets despite serving for the first set during the tiebreaker. At the Dubai Championships, he reached the second round to face the eventual champion Roger Federer and while he was a break above Federer in the first set, he lost twenty successive points and soon lost the match in straight sets. He defeated Rafael Nadal in Miami for only his second win against Nadal, but second in succession. At the French Open, he beat Taro Daniel in the first round, before losing in the second round, to Benjamin Becker in 5 sets.

Verdasco then competed at the Aegon Championships at Queen's Club. He beat Roberto Bautista Agut in the first round, before losing to eventual champion Andy Murray in straight sets. At Wimbledon, Verdasco won his first two matches in five sets against Dudi Sela and Dominic Thiem but lost in the third round to Stan Wawrinka in straight sets. He then faced Nadal again in the first round of the Hamburg Open but was unable to record a third successive win against him and lost the match in three sets. At the US Open, he lost in the second round to Milos Raonic 6–2, 6–4, 6–7^{(5)}, 7–6^{(1)}.

=== 2016: Fourteenth ATP title ===
At the Australian Open, Verdasco defeated world No. 5, 2009 champion and compatriot Rafael Nadal in the first round in five sets, thus marking just his third win against Nadal in his career; additionally, he became just the second player to beat Nadal in the first round of a Grand Slam. He subsequently lost his second round match to Dudi Sela in four sets.

=== 2017–2019: French Open doubles semifinal, 15th title, 500th career win ===
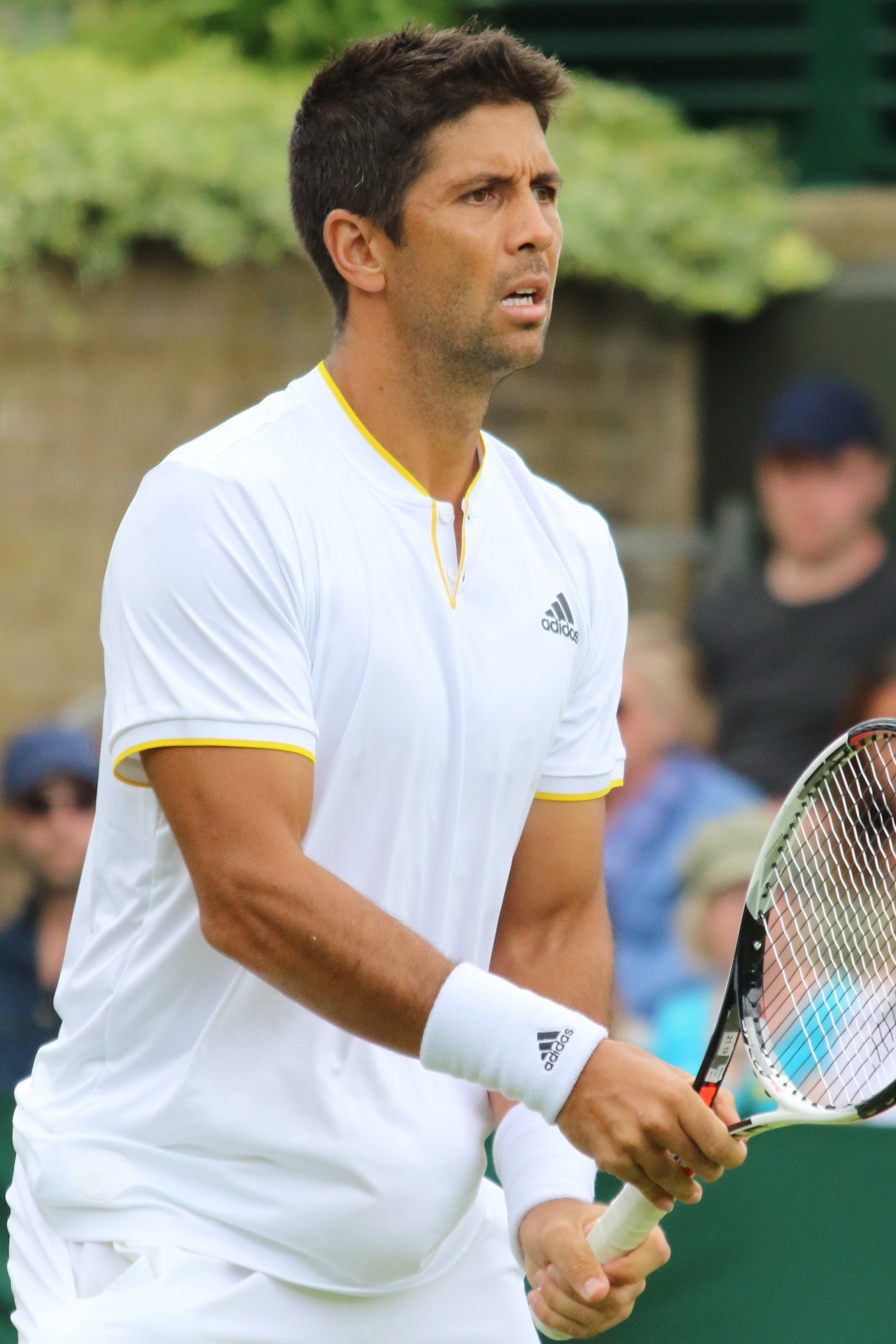
Verdasco at the 2017 Wimbledon Championships

In singles, Verdasco began the year in 42nd place, played in 25 tournaments, won 29 matches and lost 25. Among these wins, 11 were against players ranked higher than him, including 2 wins against top 10 players Dominic Thiem (6th) and Alexander Zverev (10th) while 9 of his losses were against lower ranked players. He ended his year in 34th place, having reached as high as 29th in March and as low as 43rd in August. He reached 1 final in Dubai, an ATP 500 event, where he lost to first seeded Andy Murray in straight sets. He reached 3 semifinals in Doha, Stockholm, and Båstad: In the semifinal of Doha, against second seeded and defending champion Novak Djokovic, Verdasco won the first set 6–4, and at 4–4 in the second set had 3 break points but failed to convert any. In the tie-break he led 6–2 but failed to win 5 match points and lost the tiebreak 7–9, and ultimately the match. Djokovic went on to win the tournament and defend his title. At Stockholm, he lost to defending champion del Potro in the semis; del Potro went on to win the tournament and defend his title. At Båstad, Verdasco avenged his last year loss in the final to Albert Ramos Viñolas, by defeating him in the quarterfinal; this was his 4th semifinals in 5 years, but lost to the eventual champion David Ferrer in the semis. Verdasco reached 4 quarterfinals in 2017: Paris Masters ATP 1000 event, and in Houston, Budapest, and Antalya.

In doubles, partnering Nicolás Almagro, Verdasco reached the semifinal of Qatar ExxonMobil after defeating second seeded M. Pavić–A. Peya in the first round, and F. Bagnis–J. Veselý in the quarterfinal. However, they didn't play the semifinal against V. Pospisil–R. Štěpánek who walked over to the final.

At the 2017 French Open Men's Doubles, and for the first time in his Grand Slam doubles career, Verdasco (partnering Nenad Zimonjić) reached the semifinal stage where they lost to González–Young in three sets.

In 2018, seeded eighth Verdasco reached the final of the 2018 Rio Open where he was defeated by sixth seed Diego Schwartzman but he won the doubles final with his fellow Spaniard David Marrero entering the draw as lucky losers. He reached his 500th career win at the 2018 Mutua Madrid Open making him the sixth Spaniard to join the elite club, and also the ninth active player to achieve the milestone. The 34-year-old, became the 45th player in ATP World Tour history to claim 500 match wins and also recorded 120 triumphs at the ATP World Tour Masters 1000 level. He also reached the fourth round of the 2018 French Open for the seventh time in his career where he lost to Novak Djokovic and the same round at the 2019 Wimbledon for the fifth time in his career where he lost to David Goffin.

As of December 2018, he appointed a new coach Quino Muñoz Hernandez to his team. Diego Dinomo, who worked with Andrea Hlaváčková and Guillermo García López in the past, and the physio Chema Castillo were also included as part of the new coaching team for 2019.

=== 2020–2021: 67th consecutive major, 550th win; struggles with form ===
He competed in his 67th consecutive Grand Slam at the 2020 Australian Open. His streak of 67 straight Grand Slam appearances was the second longest of all time behind Feliciano López's streak of 72 consecutive Grand Slam appearances. He made 5th place on the list of Grand Slam appearances overall. He also recorded his 550th win and became only the fifth active player on the list.

Verdasco struggled with form the rest of the season as he was recovering from a nine-month leg injury and also due to a difficult time post COVID break as he tested positive before the 2020 French Open.

As a result of his continuous struggles, on 17 May 2021 he dropped out of the top 100 for the first time since 2004 to No. 105, his lowest singles ranking in 17 years. At the 2021 Belgrade Open he recorded two consecutive victories over Frenchmen Lucas Pouille and Adrian Mannarino but lost to eventual finalist, Slovak qualifier Alex Molčan. He did not win another ATP-level match and dropped out of the top 150 at year-end finishing 2021 at World No. 154.

=== 2022–2025: Two ATP quarterfinals, ban, retirement ===
Ranked No. 201, Verdasco returned to the ATP tour at the 2022 Argentina Open in Buenos Aires where he reached the second round using his protected ranking and recorded his first ATP win over Hugo Dellien in nearly a year. He went one step further with a win over Thiago Monteiro to reach the quarterfinals. At the ATP 500 2022 Rio Open he recorded his first win at this level for 2022 defeating Dušan Lajović.

He reached his second quarterfinal of 2022 at the Estoril Open as a lucky loser where he replaced second seed Diego Schwartzman who had a first round bye. As a result, he moved up to No. 108 in the rankings on 2 May 2022.

With his participation at the 2022 Wimbledon Championships as of 27 June 2022, he was in second place on the list of Grand Slam appearances overall with 70, tied with Fabrice Santoro.

He reached the main draw of the 2022 US Open as a lucky loser, after losing to Pavel Kotov in the final round of the qualifications, recording his 18th participation at this Major and his 71st participation overall.

In November 2022, Verdasco was banned from professional tennis for two months after testing positive in February for the prohibited drug methylphenidate; he had inadvertently forgotten to renew his Therapeutic Use Exemption for the medication. He dropped out of the top 500 on 2 October 2023.

On 14 February 2025, he announced his retirement following the 2025 Qatar ExxonMobil Open in Doha where he partnered Novak Djokovic in doubles. They reached the quarterfinals after a straight sets victory over the Kazakh-Russian duo Alexander Bublik and Karen Khachanov. In the next round, they lost to No. 2 seeds Henry Patten and Harri Heliövaara, which was to be Verdasco's last professional match on the ATP Tour.

== Coaching career ==
In April 2024, Verdasco started coaching 20 years old Jordanian player Abdullah Shelbayh. In May 2024 he also started coaching Alejandro Davidovich Fokina at the 2024 French Open.

== Playing style and equipment ==
Verdasco is an offensive baseliner who is comfortable on all surfaces, with fast hard courts being his best. Verdasco is good at backhand but considers his best shot to be his forehand, a shot that commentator Brad Gilbert often refers to as his "Fearhand". His serve is characteristic of a left-handed player predominantly using slice to create a lot of spin, and is capable of speeds exceeding 230 km/h.

Verdasco is known for rivaling compatriot Rafael Nadal with the amount of topspin he can put on a ball. which partly explains his improved results since 2009, but still struggles with his nerves when facing the best players in the world. He is endorsed by Adidas (he wears the Adizero group and the Adizero Feather II) and is currently using the Head series for racquets, after having played with Tecnifibre for the majority of his career (with Yonex for a very short time in 2010), Dunlop from 2011 to 2013 and the Babolat Aeropro series in 2014. He is currently using the Head Graphene Touch Speed Pro.

== Personal life ==
Verdasco began playing tennis when he was four years old, practicing with his father on the two hard courts in the backyard of their family home. He stopped school at the age of 11, and his father took over his son's academic training. His parents own a restaurant in Madrid. He has two younger sisters.

Verdasco was diagnosed with ADHD when he was a child, but did not receive treatment in order not to have problems with doping. Verdasco supports Real Madrid. Verdasco has often spoken of his love for the English rock band Oasis and once proposed that he would play a tennis match wearing headphones listening to their 1994 album, Definitely Maybe. He is known to use mindfulness techniques during his tennis matches, often visualizing soothing and romantic scenes to help dampen the stress of professional tennis. He owns a dog named Bono Bono.

After five years of dating, Verdasco married Ana Boyer, on 7 December 2017. The wedding took place on the private island of Mustique in the Caribbean. Boyer is the daughter of former Spanish politician Miguel Boyer, and Spanish Filipina socialite, Isabel Preysler. Boyer's half-brother is Spanish singer Enrique Iglesias. The couple have three sons, Miguel (born 2019), Mateo (born 2021), and Martín (born 2024). The couple also have a daughter, Mia (born 2026).

Verdasco was named after the ABBA song Fernando, as his mother was a fan of the Swedish band.

== Career statistics ==
=== Grand Slam tournament performance timeline ===
Key
| W | F | SF | QF | #R | RR | Q# | DNQ | A | NH |

(W) winner; (F) finalist; (SF) semifinalist; (QF) quarterfinalist; (#R) rounds 4, 3, 2, 1; (RR) round-robin stage; (Q#) qualification round; (DNQ) did not qualify; (A) absent; (NH) not held; (SR) strike rate (events won / competed); (W–L) win–loss record.
To avoid confusion and double counting, these charts are updated at the conclusion of a tournament or when the player's participation has ended.

=== Singles ===
| Tournament | 2003 | 2004 | 2005 | 2006 | 2007 | 2008 | 2009 | 2010 | 2011 | 2012 | 2013 | 2014 | 2015 | 2016 | 2017 | 2018 | 2019 | 2020 | 2021 | 2022 | 2023 | SR | W–L | Win% |
|---|---|---|---|---|---|---|---|---|---|---|---|---|---|---|---|---|---|---|---|---|---|---|---|---|
| Australian Open | Q1 | 1R | 2R | 2R | 2R | 2R | SF | 4R | 4R | 1R | 3R | 2R | 3R | 2R | 1R | 2R | 3R | 3R | A | A | Q2 | 0 / 17 | 26–17 | 60% |
| French Open | Q1 | 2R | 1R | 2R | 4R | 4R | 4R | 4R | 3R | 3R | 2R | 4R | 2R | 3R | 4R | 4R | 2R | A | 1R | Q2 | A | 0 / 17 | 32–17 | 67% |
| Wimbledon | 1R | 2R | 2R | 4R | 3R | 4R | 4R | 1R | 2R | 3R | QF | 1R | 3R | 1R | 1R | 1R | 4R | NH | 1R | 1R | A | 0 / 19 | 25–19 | 58% |
| US Open | 3R | 2R | 4R | 3R | 3R | 3R | QF | QF | 3R | 3R | 1R | 2R | 2R | 1R | 2R | 3R | 2R | A | Q2 | 1R | A | 0 / 18 | 30–18 | 64% |
| Win–loss | 2–2 | 3–4 | 5–4 | 7–4 | 8–4 | 9–4 | 15–4 | 10–4 | 8–4 | 6–4 | 7–4 | 5–4 | 6–4 | 3–4 | 4–4 | 6–4 | 7–4 | 2–1 | 0–2 | 0–2 | 0–0 | 0 / 71 | 113–71 | 61% |

=== Doubles ===
| Tournament | 2004 | 2005 | 2006 | 2007 | 2008 | 2009 | 2010 | 2011 | 2012 | 2013 | 2014 | 2015 | 2016 | 2017 | 2018 | 2019 | 2020 | 2021 | 2022 | 2023 | SR | W–L | Win% |
|---|---|---|---|---|---|---|---|---|---|---|---|---|---|---|---|---|---|---|---|---|---|---|---|
| Australian Open | A | 1R | 2R | 1R | 1R | QF | A | A | A | QF | 2R | A | 2R | 1R | 1R | 2R | A | A | A | A | 0 / 11 | 10–11 | 48% |
| French Open | 1R | 1R | 1R | 2R | A | 1R | A | A | A | QF | 2R | A | 1R | SF | 1R | A | A | A | A | A | 0 / 10 | 9–10 | 47% |
| Wimbledon | 2R | 1R | A | 1R | 3R | A | A | A | A | A | A | A | A | 1R | 1R | A | NH | A | A | A | 0 / 6 | 3–6 | 33% |
| US Open | QF | 3R | 1R | 1R | QF | A | A | A | 1R | 1R | QF | 2R | 3R | 1R | A | 1R | A | A | A | A | 0 / 12 | 14–12 | 54% |
| Win–loss | 4–3 | 2–4 | 1–3 | 1–4 | 5–3 | 3–2 | 0–0 | 0–0 | 0–1 | 6–3 | 5–3 | 1–1 | 3–3 | 4–4 | 0–3 | 1–2 | 0–0 | 0–0 | 0–0 | 0–0 | 0 / 39 | 36–39 | 48% |

=== ATP 1000 finals ===
==== Singles: 1 (runner-up) ====
| Result | Year | Tournament | Surface | Opponent | Score |
|---|---|---|---|---|---|
| Loss | 2010 | Monte-Carlo Masters | Clay | (Spain) Rafael Nadal | 0–6, 1–6 |

==== Doubles: 1 (runner-up) ====
| Result | Year | Tournament | Surface | Partner | Opponents | Score |
|---|---|---|---|---|---|---|
| Loss | 2013 | Shanghai Masters | Hard | (Spain) David Marrero | (Croatia) Ivan Dodig (Brazil) Marcelo Melo | 6–7^{(2–7)}, 7–6^{(8–6)}, [2–10] |

=== Year-end championships finals ===
==== Doubles: 1 (title) ====
| Result | Year | Championship | Surface | Partner | Opponents | Score |
|---|---|---|---|---|---|---|
| Win | 2013 | ATP Finals | Hard (i) | (Spain) David Marrero | (United States) Bob Bryan (United States) Mike Bryan | 7–5, 6–7^{(3–7)}, [10–7] |
