= 2013 Copa Claro =

- Date: 18 – 24 February
- Edition: 16th
- Category: ATP World Tour 250 series
- Draw: 32S/16D
- Prize money: $484,100
- Surface: Clay
- Location: Buenos Aires, Argentina

Champions

Singles
- (Spain) David Ferrer

Doubles
- (Italy) Simone Bolelli / (Italy) Fabio Fognini
← 2012 ·	Copa Claro	· 2014 →

The 2013 Copa Claro was a men's tennis tournament played on outdoor clay courts. It was the 16th edition of the Copa Claro, and part of the ATP World Tour 250 series of the 2013 ATP World Tour. It took place in Buenos Aires, Argentina, from February 16 through February 24, 2013.

== Singles main draw entrants ==
=== Seeds ===
Country	Player	Rank^{1}	Seed
ESP	David Ferrer	4	1
ESP	Nicolás Almagro	11	2
SUI	Stanislas Wawrinka	17	3
BRA	Thomaz Bellucci	35	4
ARG	Horacio Zeballos	43	5
ITA	Fabio Fognini	44	6
ESP	Pablo Andújar	46	7
ESP	Albert Ramos	52	8

- Rankings are as of February 11, 2013.

=== Other entrants ===
The following players received wildcards into the singles main draw:

- (Argentina) Federico Delbonis
- (Argentina) Diego Schwartzman
- (Argentina) Agustín Velotti

The following players received entry from the qualifying draw:

- (Argentina) Facundo Argüello
- (Portugal) Gastão Elias
- (Serbia) Dušan Lajović
- (Germany) Julian Reister

The following player received entry as lucky loser:

- (Argentina) Marco Trungelliti

=== Withdrawals ===
Before the tournament

- (Czech Republic) Jan Hájek
- (Slovenia) Blaž Kavčič
- (Spain) Rubén Ramírez Hidalgo (right ankle injury)
- (France) Guillaume Rufin
- (Romania) Adrian Ungur

=== Retirements ===
- (Argentina) Facundo Argüello (abdominal injury)

== Doubles main draw entrants ==
=== Seeds ===
Country	Player	Country	Player	Rank^{1}	Seed
CZE	František Čermák	SVK	Michal Mertiňák	80	1
ITA	Daniele Bracciali	CZE	Lukáš Dlouhý	84	2
AUT	Oliver Marach	ARG	Horacio Zeballos	125	3
GER	Dustin Brown	GER	Christopher Kas	128	4

- Rankings are as of February 11, 2013.

=== Other entrants ===
The following pairs received wildcards into the doubles main draw:

- (Argentina) Martín Alund / (Argentina) Guido Pella
- (Argentina) Renzo Olivo / (Argentina) Marco Trungelliti

=== Withdrawals ===
During the tournament

- (Spain) Guillermo García López (low back pain)

== Finals ==
=== Singles ===
- (Spain) David Ferrer defeated (Switzerland) Stanislas Wawrinka, 6–4, 3–6, 6–1

=== Doubles ===
- (Italy) Simone Bolelli / (Italy) Fabio Fognini defeated (United States) Nicholas Monroe / (Germany) Simon Stadler, 6–3, 6–2
