= 2014 Copa Claro – Singles =

Singles
- 2014 Copa Claro

Final
- Champion: (Spain) David Ferrer
- Runner-up: (Italy) Fabio Fognini
- Score: 6–4, 6–3

Details
- Draw: 32
- Seeds: 8

Events
Singles	Doubles
- Copa Claro

The event occurred February 10 - 17 2014, with David Ferrer as the two-time defending champion. He successfully defended his title by beating Fabio Fognini in the final 6–4, 6–3.

== Seeds ==
1. (Spain) David Ferrer (champion)
2. (Italy) Fabio Fognini (final)
3. (Spain) Tommy Robredo (semifinals)
4. (Spain) Nicolás Almagro (semifinals)
5. (Spain) Marcel Granollers (second round)
6. (Netherlands) Robin Haase (quarterfinals, retired because of a back injury)
7. (Argentina) Juan Mónaco (first round)
8. (France) Jérémy Chardy (quarterfinals)

== Draw ==
Key

- Q = Qualifier
- WC = Wild card
- LL = Lucky loser
- Alt = Alternate
- ITF = ITF entry
- PR = Protected ranking
- SR = Special ranking
- SE = Special exempt
- JE = Junior exempt
- JR = Junior Accelerator Programme entrant
- CO = College Accelerator Programme entrant
- NG = Next Gen Accelerator Program entrant
- w/o = Walkover
- r = Retired
- d = Defaulted

=== Finals ===
Semifinals
1/WC	(Spain) David Ferrer	6	6
4	(Spain) Nicolás Almagro	4	2
3	(Spain) Tommy Robredo	6	5	3
2	(Italy) Fabio Fognini	3	7	6

Final
1/WC	(Spain) David Ferrer	6	6
2	(Italy) Fabio Fognini	4	3

=== Top half ===
First round
1/WC	(Spain) D Ferrer	7^{9}	6
Q	(Argentina) M González	6^{7}	4
(Spain) A Montañés	6^{4}	2
(Colombia) S Giraldo	7^{7}	6
Q	(Chile) C Garín	7	0	3
(Italy) F Volandri	5	6	6
(Spain) A Ramos	6^{3}	6	6
7	(Argentina) J Mónaco	7^{7}	4	2
4	(Spain) N Almagro	6	7
(Argentina) H Zeballos	2	5
Q	(Spain) R Ramírez Hidalgo	5	2
(Spain) D Gimeno-Traver	7	6
(Ukraine) A Dolgopolov	6	4	7^{7}
PR	(Uruguay) P Cuevas	3	6	6^{5}
(Colombia) A González	4	5
8	(France) J Chardy	6	7

Second round
1/WC	(Spain) D Ferrer	6	7^{7}
(Colombia) S Giraldo	4	6^{1}
(Italy) F Volandri	2	1
(Spain) A Ramos	6	6
4	(Spain) N Almagro	1	7	6
(Spain) D Gimeno-Traver	6	5	4
(Ukraine) A Dolgopolov	3	6	6^{3}
8	(France) J Chardy	6	3	7^{7}

Quarterfinals
1/WC	(Spain) D Ferrer	6	6
(Spain) A Ramos	1	2
4	(Spain) N Almagro	7^{9}	6
8	(France) J Chardy	6^{7}	3

Semifinals
1/WC	(Spain) D Ferrer	6	6
4	(Spain) N Almagro	4	2

=== Bottom half ===
First round
6	(Netherlands) R Haase	6	6^{6}	6
Q	(Argentina) M Alund	4	7^{8}	3
(Portugal) J Sousa	4	2
(Argentina) C Berlocq	6	6
(Spain) G García-López	6^{6}	4
WC	(Argentina) G Pella	7^{8}	6
(Spain) P Carreño Busta	4	4
3	(Spain) T Robredo	6	6
5	(Spain) M Granollers	7	3	6
(Slovenia) A Bedene	5	6	2
(Argentina) F Delbonis	6	5	1
(Spain) P Andújar	3	7	6
WC	(Argentina) F Argüello	3	4
(Argentina) L Mayer	6	6
(Germany) J Reister	5	2
2	(Italy) F Fognini	7	6

Second round
6	(Netherlands) R Haase	6	6^{4}	6
(Argentina) C Berlocq	2	7^{7}	2
WC	(Argentina) G Pella	6	1	4
3	(Spain) T Robredo	4	6	6
5	(Spain) M Granollers	3	0
(Spain) P Andújar	6	6
(Argentina) L Mayer	7^{7}	3	2
2	(Italy) F Fognini	6^{4}	6	6

Quarterfinals
6	(Netherlands) R Haase	1	0^{r}
3	(Spain) T Robredo	6	2
(Spain) P Andújar	4	3
2	(Italy) F Fognini	6	6

Semifinals
3	(Spain) T Robredo	6	5	3
2	(Italy) F Fognini	3	7	6

== Qualifying ==
=== Seeds ===
1. (France) Stéphane Robert (first round, retired)
2. (Austria) Andreas Haider-Maurer (qualifying competition)
3. (Argentina) Diego Sebastián Schwartzman (first round)
4. (Spain) Pere Riba (first round)
5. (Brazil) Thomaz Bellucci (first round, retired)
6. (Argentina) Facundo Bagnis (first round)
7. (Argentina) Martín Alund (qualified)
8. (Argentina) Guido Andreozzi (second round)

=== Qualifiers ===
1. (Spain) Rubén Ramírez Hidalgo
2. (Argentina) Martín Alund
3. (Chile) Christian Garín
4. (Argentina) Máximo González

=== Qualifying draw ===
==== First qualifier ====
First round
1	(France) Stéphane Robert	7	6^{4}	1^{r}
(Argentina) Renzo Olivo	5	7^{7}	5
(Italy) Alessandro Giannessi	0^{r}
(Spain) Rubén Ramírez Hidalgo	5
(Colombia) Carlos Salamanca	4	4
WC	(United States) Nicholas Monroe	6	6
WC	(Germany) Simon Stadler	1	6	6
6	(Argentina) Facundo Bagnis	6	4	1

Second round
(Argentina) Renzo Olivo	6^{1}	6	5
(Spain) Rubén Ramírez Hidalgo	7^{7}	3	7
WC	(United States) Nicholas Monroe	4	6	1
WC	(Germany) Simon Stadler	6	4	0^{r}

Qualifying competition
(Spain) Rubén Ramírez Hidalgo	7^{7}	6
WC	(United States) Nicholas Monroe	6^{5}	0

==== Second qualifier ====
First round
2	(Austria) Andreas Haider-Maurer	5
(Brazil) Rogério Dutra da Silva	4^{r}
(Italy) Potito Starace	7^{7}	6
(Argentina) Andrés Molteni	6^{3}	3
(Argentina) Eduardo Schwank	6^{2}	2
WC	(Japan) Taro Daniel	7^{7}	6
(Argentina) Andrea Collarini	4	6^{3}
7	(Argentina) Martín Alund	6	7^{7}

Second round
2	(Austria) Andreas Haider-Maurer	6	6
(Italy) Potito Starace	3	4
WC	(Japan) Taro Daniel	1	0
7	(Argentina) Martín Alund	6	6

Qualifying competition
2	(Austria) Andreas Haider-Maurer	3	6	1
7	(Argentina) Martín Alund	6	4	6

==== Third qualifier ====
First round
3	(Argentina) Diego Sebastián Schwartzman	1	4
(Chile) Christian Garín	6	6
WC	(Italy) Daniele Bracciali	2	2
(Argentina) Juan Ignacio Londero	6	6
(Austria) Gerald Melzer	6	6
(Bolivia) Hugo Dellien	2	4
(Venezuela) David Souto	4	4
5	(Brazil) Thomaz Bellucci	6	2^{r}

Second round
(Chile) Christian Garín	6	7^{7}
(Argentina) Juan Ignacio Londero	2	6^{5}
(Austria) Gerald Melzer	6	7^{8}
(Venezuela) David Souto	0	6^{6}

Qualifying competition
(Chile) Christian Garín	3	6	6
(Austria) Gerald Melzer	6	4	4

==== Fourth qualifier ====
First round
4	(Spain) Pere Riba	3	1
(Brazil) Guilherme Clezar	6	6
(Argentina) Marco Trungelliti	2	6	6
(Chile) Gonzalo Lama	6	4	2
(Brazil) Fernando Romboli	4	2
(Argentina) Máximo González	6	6
(Brazil) André Ghem	6	4	3
8	(Argentina) Guido Andreozzi	1	6	6

Second round
(Brazil) Guilherme Clezar	6	7^{7}
(Argentina) Marco Trungelliti	4	6^{3}
(Argentina) Máximo González	6	6
8	(Argentina) Guido Andreozzi	2	4

Qualifying competition
(Brazil) Guilherme Clezar	3	6	4
(Argentina) Máximo González	6	4	6
