= 2014 Copa Claro – Doubles =

Doubles
- 2014 Copa Claro

Final
- Champions: (Spain) Marcel Granollers (Spain) Marc López
- Runners-up: (Uruguay) Pablo Cuevas (Argentina) Horacio Zeballos
- Score: 7–5, 6–4

Events
Singles	Doubles
← 2013 ·	Copa Claro	· 2015 →

Simone Bolelli and Fabio Fognini were the defending champions, but they decided not to participate.
Marcel Granollers and Marc López won the title, defeating Pablo Cuevas and Horacio Zeballos in the final, 7–5, 6–4.

== Seeds ==
1. (Spain) Marcel Granollers / (Spain) Marc López (champions)
2. (Colombia) Juan Sebastián Cabal / (Colombia) Robert Farah (first round)
3. (Austria) Oliver Marach / (Romania) Florin Mergea (first round)
4. (Uruguay) Pablo Cuevas / (Argentina) Horacio Zeballos (final)

== Draw ==
=== Key ===
- Q = Qualifier
- WC = Wild card
- LL = Lucky loser
- Alt = Alternate
- ITF = ITF entry
- PR = Protected ranking
- SR = Special ranking
- SE = Special exempt
- JE = Junior exempt
- JR = Junior Accelerator Programme entrant
- CO = College Accelerator Programme entrant
- NG = Next Gen Accelerator Program entrant
- w/o = Walkover
- r = Retired
- d = Defaulted

=== Draw ===
First round
1	(Spain) M Granollers (Spain) M López	7	6
WC	(Argentina) F Bagnis (Argentina) F Delbonis	5	2
(Netherlands) R Haase (Germany) C Kas	4	6^{3}
(United States) N Monroe (Germany) S Stadler	6	7^{7}
3	(Austria) O Marach (Romania) F Mergea	5	6	[9]
(Spain) P Andújar (Italy) D Bracciali	7	3	[11]
(Spain) P Carreño Busta (Spain) A Ramos	6^{9}	5
(Ukraine) A Dolgopolov (Italy) P Starace	7^{11}	7
(Brazil) A Sá (Portugal) J Sousa	3	3
(Spain) D Gimeno-Traver (Spain) A Montañés	6	6
(Spain) G García-López (Austria) P Oswald	6	6^{5}	[3]
4	(Uruguay) P Cuevas (Argentina) H Zeballos	4	7^{7}	[10]
(Colombia) S Giraldo (Colombia) A González	5	1
(France) J Chardy (Czech Republic) L Dlouhý	7	6
WC	(Argentina) M González (Argentina) E Schwank	7	2	[10]
2	(Colombia) JS Cabal (Colombia) R Farah	5	6	[8]

Quarterfinals
1	(Spain) M Granollers (Spain) M López	7^{7}	6
(United States) N Monroe (Germany) S Stadler	6^{5}	4
(Spain) P Andújar (Italy) D Bracciali	7	3	[8]
(Ukraine) A Dolgopolov (Italy) P Starace	5	6	[10]
(Spain) D Gimeno-Traver (Spain) A Montañés	4	5
4	(Uruguay) P Cuevas (Argentina) H Zeballos	6	7
(France) J Chardy (Czech Republic) L Dlouhý	6	4	[4]
WC	(Argentina) M González (Argentina) E Schwank	2	6	[10]

Semifinals
1	(Spain) M Granollers (Spain) M López	6	6
(Ukraine) A Dolgopolov (Italy) P Starace	4	4
4	(Uruguay) P Cuevas (Argentina) H Zeballos	7	6
WC	(Argentina) M González (Argentina) E Schwank	5	3

Final
1	(Spain) M Granollers (Spain) M López	7	6
4	(Uruguay) P Cuevas (Argentina) H Zeballos	5	4
