= 2014 Copa Claro =

- Date: 8 – 16 February
- Edition: 17th
- Category: ATP World Tour 250 series
- Draw: 32S/16D
- Prize money: $484,100
- Surface: Clay / outdoor
- Location: Buenos Aires, Argentina

Champions

Singles
- (Spain) David Ferrer

Doubles
- (Spain) Marcel Granollers / (Spain) Marc López
← 2013 ·	Copa Claro	· 2015 →

The 2014 Copa Claro was a men's tennis tournament played on outdoor clay courts. It was the 17th edition of the Copa Claro, and part of the ATP World Tour 250 series of the 2014 ATP World Tour. It took place in Buenos Aires, Argentina, from February 8 through February 16, 2014.

== Singles main-draw entrants ==
=== Seeds ===
Country	Player	Rank^{1}	Seed
ESP	David Ferrer	5	1
ITA	Fabio Fognini	15	2
ESP	Tommy Robredo	16	3
ESP	Nicolás Almagro	18	4
ESP	Marcel Granollers	35	5
NED	Robin Haase	41	6
ARG	Juan Mónaco	42	7
FRA	Jérémy Chardy	44	8

- Rankings are as of February 3, 2014.

=== Other entrants ===
The following players received wildcards into the singles main draw:

- (Argentina) Facundo Argüello
- (Spain) David Ferrer
- (Argentina) Guido Pella

The following players received entry from the qualifying draw:

- (Argentina) Martín Alund
- (Chile) Christian Garín
- (Argentina) Máximo González
- (Spain) Rubén Ramírez Hidalgo

=== Withdrawals ===
Before the tournament

- (Spain) Rafael Nadal (stomach virus)

=== Retirements ===
- (Netherlands) Robin Haase (back injury)

== Doubles main-draw entrants ==
=== Seeds ===
Country	Player	Country	Player	Rank^{1}	Seed
ESP	Marcel Granollers	ESP	Marc López	47	1
COL	Juan Sebastián Cabal	COL	Robert Farah	94	2
AUT	Oliver Marach	ROU	Florin Mergea	97	3
URU	Pablo Cuevas	ARG	Horacio Zeballos	100	4

- Rankings are as of February 3, 2014.

=== Other entrants ===
The following pairs received wildcards into the doubles main draw:

- (Argentina) Facundo Bagnis / (Argentina) Federico Delbonis
- (Argentina) Máximo González / (Argentina) Eduardo Schwank

== Finals ==
=== Singles ===
- (Spain) David Ferrer defeated (Italy) Fabio Fognini, 6–4, 6–3

=== Doubles ===
- (Spain) Marcel Granollers / (Spain) Marc López defeated (Uruguay) Pablo Cuevas / (Argentina) Horacio Zeballos, 7–5, 6–4
