= 2015 Argentina Open – Doubles =

Doubles
- 2015 Argentina Open

Final
- Champions: (Finland) Jarkko Nieminen (Brazil) André Sá
- Runners-up: (Spain) Pablo Andújar (Austria) Oliver Marach
- Score: 4–6, 6–4, [10–7]

Events
Singles	Doubles
← 2014 ·	Argentina Open	· 2016 →

Marcel Granollers and Marc López were the defending champions, but they chose to compete in Acapulco instead.
Jarkko Nieminen and André Sá won the title, defeating Pablo Andújar and Oliver Marach in the final, 4–6, 6–4, [10–7].

== Seeds ==
1. (Uruguay) Pablo Cuevas / (Spain) David Marrero (first round)
2. (Argentina) Máximo González / (Argentina) Horacio Zeballos (first round)
3. (Sweden) Johan Brunström / (United States) Nicholas Monroe (first round)
4. (Czech Republic) František Čermák / (Czech Republic) Jiří Veselý (first round)

== Draw ==
=== Key ===
- Q = Qualifier
- WC = Wild card
- LL = Lucky loser
- Alt = Alternate
- SE = Special exempt
- PR = Protected ranking
- ITF = ITF entry
- JE = Junior exempt
- w/o = Walkover
- r = Retired
- d = Defaulted
- SR = Special ranking

=== Draw ===
First round
1	(Uruguay) P Cuevas (Spain) D Marrero	7	6^{4}	[9]
(Finland) J Nieminen (Brazil) A Sá	5	7^{7}	[11]
(Brazil) T Bellucci (Brazil) M Demoliner	6	1	[10]
(Germany) G Kretschmer (Germany) A Satschko	4	6	[3]
4	(Czech Republic) F Čermák (Czech Republic) J Veselý	6	5	[7]
(Argentina) J Mónaco (Spain) R Nadal	4	7	[10]
WC	(Argentina) F Delbonis (Argentina) A Molteni	7^{7}	6
(Argentina) F Bagnis (Spain) A Ramos-Viñolas	6^{2}	4
(Argentina) G Durán (Italy) P Lorenzi	4	5
(Spain) P Andújar (Austria) O Marach	6	7
(Spain) N Almagro (Italy) F Fognini	6	6
3	(Sweden) J Brunström (United States) N Monroe	4	3
PR	(France) S Robert (Slovenia) B Rola	1	5
(Argentina) C Berlocq (Argentina) D Schwartzman	6	7
WC	(Argentina) F Argüello (Argentina) P Cachin	7	3	[13]
2	(Argentina) M González (Argentina) H Zeballos	5	6	[11]

Quarterfinals
(Finland) J Nieminen (Brazil) A Sá	1	6	[10]
(Brazil) T Bellucci (Brazil) M Demoliner	6	3	[5]
(Argentina) J Mónaco (Spain) R Nadal	4	6	[7]
WC	(Argentina) F Delbonis (Argentina) A Molteni	6	3	[10]
(Spain) P Andújar (Austria) O Marach	w/o
(Spain) N Almagro (Italy) F Fognini
(Argentina) C Berlocq (Argentina) D Schwartzman	6	6
WC	(Argentina) F Argüello (Argentina) P Cachin	1	3

Semifinals
(Finland) J Nieminen (Brazil) A Sá	2	6	[10]
WC	(Argentina) F Delbonis (Argentina) A Molteni	6	2	[6]
(Spain) P Andújar (Austria) O Marach	6	6
(Argentina) C Berlocq (Argentina) D Schwartzman	3	2

Final
(Finland) J Nieminen (Brazil) A Sá	4	6	[10]
(Spain) P Andújar (Austria) O Marach	6	4	[7]
