= 2012 Copa Claro =

- Date: 18–26 February
- Edition: 15th
- Category: ATP World Tour 250 series
- Draw: 32S / 16D
- Prize money: $484,100
- Surface: Clay / outdoor
- Location: Buenos Aires, Argentina

Champions

Singles
- (Spain) David Ferrer

Doubles
- (Spain) David Marrero / (Spain) Fernando Verdasco
← 2011 ·	Copa Claro	· 2013 →

The 2012 Copa Claro was a men's tennis tournament played on outdoor clay courts. It was the 15th edition of the Copa Claro, and it was part of the ATP World Tour 250 series of the 2012 ATP World Tour. It took place in Buenos Aires, Argentina, from February 18 through February 26, 2012. David Ferrer won the singles title.

== Singles main draw entrants ==
=== Seeds ===
Country	Player	Rank^{1}	Seed
ESP	David Ferrer	5	1
ESP	Nicolás Almagro	11	2
FRA	Gilles Simon	12	3
JPN	Kei Nishikori	18	4
ARG	Juan Mónaco	22	5
SUI	Stanislas Wawrinka	26	6
ESP	Fernando Verdasco	27	7
ARG	Juan Ignacio Chela	28	8

- Rankings are as of February 13, 2012

=== Other entrants ===
The following players received wildcards into the main draw:

- (Argentina) Facundo Bagnis
- (Chile) Fernando González
- (Argentina) Horacio Zeballos

The following players received entry from the qualifying draw:

- (Russia) Igor Andreev
- (Argentina) Federico Delbonis
- (Spain) Javier Martí
- (Argentina) Andrés Molteni

The following player received entry as lucky loser:

- (United States) Wayne Odesnik

=== Withdrawals ===
- (Brazil) Thomaz Bellucci (ankle injury)

=== Retirements ===
- (Spain) Albert Montañés (back injury)
- (Italy) Filippo Volandri (right ankle injury)

== Doubles main draw entrants ==
=== Seeds ===
Country	Player	Country	Player	Rank^{1}	Seed
ITA	Daniele Bracciali	ITA	Potito Starace	89	1
SVK	Michal Mertiňák	BRA	André Sá	115	2
ESP	Pablo Andújar	ARG	Carlos Berlocq	162	3
ESP	Pere Riba	BRA	João Souza	270	4

- Rankings are as of February 13, 2012

=== Other entrants ===
The following pairs received wildcards into the doubles main draw:

- (Argentina) Facundo Argüello / (Argentina) Agustín Velotti
- (Argentina) Federico Delbonis / (Argentina) Diego Junqueira

The following pair received entry as alternates:

- (Serbia) Nikola Ćirić / (Uruguay) Marcel Felder

=== Withdrawals ===
- (Spain) Albert Montañés (back injury)

== Finals ==
=== Singles ===
(Spain) David Ferrer defeated (Spain) Nicolás Almagro 4–6, 6–3, 6–2

- It was Ferrer's 2nd title of the year and 13th of his career.

=== Doubles ===
(Spain) David Marrero / (Spain) Fernando Verdasco defeated (Slovakia) Michal Mertiňák / (Brazil) André Sá 6–4, 6–4
