= 2012 Copa Claro – Singles =

Singles
- 2012 Copa Claro

Final
- Champion: (Spain) David Ferrer
- Runner-up: (Spain) Nicolás Almagro
- Score: 4–6, 6–3, 6–2

Details
- Draw: 32
- Seeds: 8

Events
Singles	Doubles
- Copa Claro

David Ferrer won the tournament winning the final against the defending champion Nicolás Almagro by 4–6, 6–3, 6–2.

== Seeds ==
1. (Spain) David Ferrer (champion)
2. (Spain) Nicolás Almagro (final)
3. (France) Gilles Simon (second round)
4. (Japan) Kei Nishikori (quarterfinals)
5. (Argentina) Juan Mónaco (second round)
6. (Switzerland) Stanislas Wawrinka (semifinals)
7. (Spain) Fernando Verdasco (second round)
8. (Argentina) Juan Ignacio Chela (first round)

== Draw ==
Key

- Q = Qualifier
- WC = Wild card
- LL = Lucky loser
- Alt = Alternate
- ITF = ITF entry
- PR = Protected ranking
- SR = Special ranking
- SE = Special exempt
- JE = Junior exempt
- JR = Junior Accelerator Programme entrant
- CO = College Accelerator Programme entrant
- NG = Next Gen Accelerator Program entrant
- w/o = Walkover
- r = Retired
- d = Defaulted

=== Finals ===
Semifinals
1	(Spain) David Ferrer	6	6
(Argentina) David Nalbandian	1	4
6	(Switzerland) Stanislas Wawrinka	4	6	5
2	(Spain) Nicolás Almagro	6	3	7

Final
1	(Spain) David Ferrer	4	6	6
2	(Spain) Nicolás Almagro	6	3	2

=== Top half ===
First round
1	(Spain) D Ferrer	6	6
Q	(Argentina) A Molteni	1	0
WC	(Argentina) F Bagnis	5	6	6
(Argentina) L Mayer	7	4	2
WC	(Chile) F González	7	1
(Spain) A Montañés	5	0^{r}
(Spain) A Ramos	4	6	6
8	(Argentina) JI Chela	6	3	4
3	(France) G Simon	6	7
(Portugal) R Machado	3	5
(Argentina) C Berlocq	6^{5}	6	6
(Spain) P Riba	7^{7}	0	0
(Argentina) D Nalbandian	6	6
LL	(United States) W Odesnik	2	3
(Italy) F Volandri	1	1^{r}
5	(Argentina) J Mónaco	6	3

Second round
1	(Spain) D Ferrer	6	6
WC	(Argentina) F Bagnis	3	4
WC	(Chile) F González	7^{8}	7^{7}
(Spain) A Ramos	6^{6}	6^{5}
3	(France) G Simon	2	1
(Argentina) C Berlocq	6	6
(Argentina) D Nalbandian	6	6
5	(Argentina) J Mónaco	3	1

Quarterfinals
1	(Spain) D Ferrer	6	6
WC	(Chile) F González	2	4
(Argentina) C Berlocq	0	3
(Argentina) D Nalbandian	6	6

Semifinals
1	(Spain) D Ferrer	6	6
(Argentina) D Nalbandian	1	4

=== Bottom half ===
First round
6	(Switzerland) S Wawrinka	6	6
WC	(Argentina) H Zeballos	3	4
(France) B Paire	2	7^{7}	6
Q	(Spain) J Martí	6	6^{0}	2
(Romania) V Hănescu	6	4	7^{7}
(Spain) P Andújar	3	6	6^{4}
(Spain) JC Ferrero	5	6	2
4	(Japan) K Nishikori	7	3	6
7	(Spain) F Verdasco	6	6
(France) É Prodon	4	1
(Slovenia) B Kavčič	2	2
Q	(Russia) I Andreev	6	6
(Portugal) F Gil	2	2
Q	(Argentina) F Delbonis	6	6
(Italy) P Starace	6	3	6^{4}
2	(Spain) N Almagro	4	6	7^{7}

Second round
6	(Switzerland) S Wawrinka	6	5	6
(France) B Paire	3	7	2
(Romania) V Hănescu	6	5	1
4	(Japan) K Nishikori	3	7	6
7	(Spain) F Verdasco	6^{3}	3
Q	(Russia) I Andreev	7^{7}	6
Q	(Argentina) F Delbonis	3	2
2	(Spain) N Almagro	6	6

Quarterfinals
6	(Switzerland) S Wawrinka	6	6
4	(Japan) K Nishikori	4	2
Q	(Russia) I Andreev	3	5
2	(Spain) N Almagro	6	7

Semifinals
6	(Switzerland) S Wawrinka	4	6	5
2	(Spain) N Almagro	6	3	7

== Qualifying ==
=== Seeds ===
1. (France) Jérémy Chardy (first round)
2. (Brazil) João Souza (second round)
3. (Spain) Daniel Gimeno-Traver (first round)
4. (United States) Wayne Odesnik (qualifying competition)
5. (Brazil) Rogério Dutra da Silva (qualifying competition)
6. (Argentina) Diego Junqueira (first round)
7. (Russia) Igor Andreev (qualified)
8. (Argentina) Máximo González (first round)

=== Qualifiers ===
1. (Argentina) Andrés Molteni
2. (Russia) Igor Andreev
3. (Spain) Javier Martí
4. (Argentina) Federico Delbonis

=== Draw ===
==== First qualifier ====
First round
1	(France) Jérémy Chardy	2	5
(Argentina) Andrés Molteni	6	7
(Brazil) André Ghem	2	4
(Argentina) Marco Trungelliti	6	6
(Argentina) Guido Pella	4	1
(Argentina) Agustín Velotti	6	6
(Argentina) Facundo Argüello	6^{4}	6	7^{7}
8	(Argentina) Máximo González	7^{7}	1	6^{2}

Second round
(Argentina) Andrés Molteni	6	7^{7}
(Argentina) Marco Trungelliti	3	6^{3}
(Argentina) Agustín Velotti	5	3
(Argentina) Facundo Argüello	7	6

Qualifying competition
(Argentina) Andrés Molteni	5	6	6
(Argentina) Facundo Argüello	7	3	4

==== Second qualifier ====
First round
2	(Brazil) João Souza	6	6
WC	(Argentina) Juan-Martín Aranguren	3	3
(Italy) Alessandro Giannessi	1	6^{1}
(Chile) Paul Capdeville	6	7^{7}
WC	(Argentina) Kevin Konfederak	0	3
(Argentina) Nicolás Pastor	6	6
(Serbia) Nikola Ćirić	1	4
7	(Russia) Igor Andreev	6	6

Second round
2	(Brazil) João Souza	4	2
(Chile) Paul Capdeville	6	6
(Argentina) Nicolás Pastor	0	1
7	(Russia) Igor Andreev	6	6

Qualifying competition
(Chile) Paul Capdeville	6^{8}	3
7	(Russia) Igor Andreev	7^{10}	6

==== Third qualifier ====
First round
3	(Spain) Daniel Gimeno-Traver	3	7^{7}	3
(Spain) Javier Martí	6	6^{4}	6
(Argentina) Pablo Galdón	3	3
(Argentina) Diego Schwartzman	6	6
(Argentina) Eduardo Schwank	7^{7}	6
WC	(Argentina) Guillermo Durán	6^{2}	3
(Uruguay) Marcel Felder	2	0
5	(Brazil) Rogério Dutra da Silva	6	6

Second round
(Spain) Javier Martí	6	6
(Argentina) Diego Schwartzman	4	1
(Argentina) Eduardo Schwank	6^{8}	6	3
5	(Brazil) Rogério Dutra da Silva	7^{10}	4	6

Qualifying competition
(Spain) Javier Martí	2	6	6
5	(Brazil) Rogério Dutra da Silva	6	4	3

==== Fourth qualifier ====
First round
4	(United States) Wayne Odesnik	6	7^{7}
(Argentina) Sebastián Decoud	3	6^{4}
(Argentina) Juan Pablo Brzezicki	7	6
WC	(Argentina) Maximiliano Estévez	5	1
(Argentina) Martín Alund	7^{7}	7
(Portugal) Gastão Elias	6^{5}	5
(Argentina) Federico Delbonis	7	6
6	(Argentina) Diego Junqueira	5	1

Second round
4	(United States) Wayne Odesnik	6	6
(Argentina) Juan Pablo Brzezicki	2	3
(Argentina) Martín Alund	6^{6}	6	2
(Argentina) Federico Delbonis	7^{8}	4	6

Qualifying competition
4	(United States) Wayne Odesnik	3	7^{7}	2
(Argentina) Federico Delbonis	6	6^{1}	6
