= 2013 Copa Claro – Singles =

Singles
- 2013 Copa Claro

Final
- Champion: (Spain) David Ferrer
- Runner-up: (Switzerland) Stanislas Wawrinka
- Score: 6–4, 3–6, 6–1

Details
- Draw: 32
- Seeds: 8

Events
Singles	Doubles
- Copa Claro

David Ferrer was the reigning champion, and he successfully defended his title by defeating Stanislas Wawrinka in the final 6–4, 3–6, 6–1.

== Seeds ==
1. (Spain) David Ferrer (champion)
2. (Spain) Nicolás Almagro (semifinals)
3. (Switzerland) Stanislas Wawrinka (final)
4. (Brazil) Thomaz Bellucci (first round)
5. (Argentina) Horacio Zeballos (first round)
6. (Italy) Fabio Fognini (quarterfinals)
7. (Spain) Pablo Andújar (first round)
8. (Spain) Albert Ramos (quarterfinals)

== Draw ==
Key

- Q = Qualifier
- WC = Wild card
- LL = Lucky loser
- Alt = Alternate
- ITF = ITF entry
- PR = Protected ranking
- SR = Special ranking
- SE = Special exempt
- JE = Junior exempt
- JR = Junior Accelerator Programme entrant
- CO = College Accelerator Programme entrant
- NG = Next Gen Accelerator Program entrant
- w/o = Walkover
- r = Retired
- d = Defaulted

=== Finals ===
Semifinals
1	(Spain) David Ferrer	6	6
(Spain) Tommy Robredo	3	2
3	(Switzerland) Stanislas Wawrinka	6	7
2	(Spain) Nicolás Almagro	3	5

Final
1	(Spain) David Ferrer	6	3	6
3	(Switzerland) Stanislas Wawrinka	4	6	1

=== Top half ===
First round
1	(Spain) D Ferrer	6	6
WC	(Argentina) A Velotti	4	1
(Argentina) C Berlocq	3	6	3
(Argentina) D Nalbandian	6	2	6
LL	(Argentina) M Trungelliti	4	6	1
Q	(Argentina) F Argüello	6	3	0^{r}
(Spain) G García-López	5	3
6	(Italy) F Fognini	7	6
4	(Brazil) T Bellucci	4	6	1
WC	(Argentina) D Schwartzman	6	4	6
(Spain) T Robredo	6	6
Q	(Portugal) G Elias	3	0
Q	(Germany) J Reister	7	6
SE	(Argentina) M Alund	5	1
(Slovenia) A Bedene	4	7^{7}	6
5	(Argentina) H Zeballos	6	6^{4}	3

Second round
1	(Spain) D Ferrer	2	6	6
(Argentina) D Nalbandian	6	4	0
LL	(Argentina) M Trungelliti	5	2
6	(Italy) F Fognini	7	6
WC	(Argentina) D Schwartzman	3	1
(Spain) T Robredo	6	6
Q	(Germany) J Reister	6	1	6
(Slovenia) A Bedene	1	6	2

Quarterfinals
1	(Spain) D Ferrer	6	6
6	(Italy) F Fognini	2	1
(Spain) T Robredo	6	6
Q	(Germany) J Reister	3	2

Semifinals
1	(Spain) D Ferrer	6	6
(Spain) T Robredo	3	2

=== Bottom half ===
First round
8	(Spain) A Ramos	6	6
(Italy) F Cipolla	1	0
(Argentina) L Mayer	5	6	6
(Italy) S Bolelli	7	2	3
Q	(Serbia) D Lajović	4	5
(Spain) D Gimeno-Traver	6	7
(Italy) P Lorenzi	3	3
3	(Switzerland) S Wawrinka	6	6
7	(Spain) P Andújar	7	2	4
(Spain) A Montañés	5	6	6
(Portugal) J Sousa	1	4
WC	(Argentina) F Delbonis	6	6
(Russia) A Kuznetsov	7^{7}	6
(Italy) F Volandri	6^{5}	3
(Argentina) G Pella	3	2
2	(Spain) N Almagro	6	6

Second round
8	(Spain) A Ramos	6	7^{7}
(Argentina) L Mayer	3	6^{3}
(Spain) D Gimeno-Traver	1	4
3	(Switzerland) S Wawrinka	6	6
(Spain) A Montañés	1	4
WC	(Argentina) F Delbonis	6	6
(Russia) A Kuznetsov	6^{5}	2
2	(Spain) N Almagro	7^{7}	6

Quarterfinals
8	(Spain) A Ramos	6^{4}	4
3	(Switzerland) S Wawrinka	7^{7}	6
WC	(Argentina) F Delbonis	1	6^{3}
2	(Spain) N Almagro	6	7^{7}

Semifinals
3	(Switzerland) S Wawrinka	6	7
2	(Spain) N Almagro	3	5

== Qualifying ==
=== Seeds ===
1. (Brazil) Rogério Dutra da Silva (second round)
2. (Croatia) Antonio Veić (first round)
3. (Portugal) Gastão Elias (qualified)
4. (Chile) Paul Capdeville (second round)
5. (United States) Wayne Odesnik (first round)
6. (Serbia) Dušan Lajović (qualified)
7. (Germany) Dustin Brown (second round)
8. (Serbia) Boris Pašanski (first round, retired)

=== Qualifiers ===
1. (Serbia) Dušan Lajović
2. (Argentina) Facundo Argüello
3. (Portugal) Gastão Elias
4. (Germany) Julian Reister

=== Lucky losers ===
1. (Argentina) Marco Trungelliti

=== Draw ===
==== First qualifier ====
First round
1	(Brazil) Rogério Dutra da Silva	6	6
(Argentina) Juan-Pablo Amado	1	2
(Brazil) Guilherme Clezar	6	6
WC	(Argentina) Máximo González	4	2
(Spain) Javier Martí	6	2	1
(Argentina) Andrés Molteni	3	6	6
(Canada) Steven Diez	6^{5}	4
6	(Serbia) Dušan Lajović	7^{7}	6

Second round
1	(Brazil) Rogério Dutra da Silva	6	2	1
(Brazil) Guilherme Clezar	4	6	6
(Argentina) Andrés Molteni	4	6^{1}
6	(Serbia) Dušan Lajović	6	7^{7}

Qualifying competition
(Brazil) Guilherme Clezar	1	3
6	(Serbia) Dušan Lajović	6	6

==== Second qualifier ====
First round
2	(Croatia) Antonio Veić	1	2
(Argentina) Marco Trungelliti	6	6
(Italy) Potito Starace	6	6
WC	(Argentina) Juan Ignacio Londero	3	2
(Argentina) Facundo Argüello	6	7
PR	(Italy) Stefano Travaglia	3	5
WC	(Argentina) Guillermo Durán	4	6	6^{2}
7	(Germany) Dustin Brown	6	3	7^{7}

Second round
(Argentina) Marco Trungelliti	6	2	6
(Italy) Potito Starace	4	6	1
(Argentina) Facundo Argüello	7	6
7	(Germany) Dustin Brown	5	4

Qualifying competition
(Argentina) Marco Trungelliti	7^{7}	1	3
(Argentina) Facundo Argüello	6^{5}	6	6

==== Third qualifier ====
First round
3	(Portugal) Gastão Elias	6^{6}	6	1
(Chile) Jorge Aguilar	7^{8}	3	0^{r}
(Ecuador) Julio César Campozano	3	0^{r}
(Italy) Gianluca Naso	6	2
(Portugal) Frederico Gil	1	0
(Russia) Teymuraz Gabashvili	6	6
(Argentina) Facundo Bagnis	3	6	6
5	(United States) Wayne Odesnik	6	2	3

Second round
3	(Portugal) Gastão Elias	4	7^{7}	6
(Italy) Gianluca Naso	6	6^{4}	2
(Russia) Teymuraz Gabashvili	4	4
(Argentina) Facundo Bagnis	6	6

Qualifying competition
3	(Portugal) Gastão Elias	6	7
(Argentina) Facundo Bagnis	2	5

==== Fourth qualifier ====
First round
4	(Chile) Paul Capdeville	6	6
(Argentina) Leandro Migani	3	0
(Argentina) Renzo Olivo	6	6
WC	(Argentina) Juan Ignacio Galarza	4	2
(Argentina) Andrea Collarini	4	1
(Argentina) Diego Junqueira	6	6
(Germany) Julian Reister	6^{10}	6	3
8	(Serbia) Boris Pašanski	7^{12}	2	0^{r}

Second round
4	(Chile) Paul Capdeville	5	6	2
(Argentina) Renzo Olivo	7	1	6
(Argentina) Diego Junqueira	3	5
(Germany) Julian Reister	6	7

Qualifying competition
(Argentina) Renzo Olivo	6	1	5
(Germany) Julian Reister	4	6	7
