= 2015 Argentina Open =

- Date: 23 February – 1 March
- Edition: 18th
- Category: ATP World Tour 250 series
- Draw: 28S / 16D
- Prize money: $573,750
- Surface: Clay / outdoor
- Location: Buenos Aires, Argentina

Champions

Singles
- (Spain) Rafael Nadal

Doubles
- (Finland) Jarkko Nieminen / (Brazil) André Sá
← 2014 ·	ATP Buenos Aires	· 2016 →

The 2015 Argentina Open was a men's tennis tournament played on outdoor clay courts. It was the 18th edition of the ATP Buenos Aires event, and part of the ATP World Tour 250 series of the 2015 ATP World Tour. It took place in Buenos Aires, Argentina, from 23 February through 1 March 2015. Rafael Nadal won the singles title.

== Points and prize money ==
=== Point distribution ===
Event	W	F	SF	QF	Round of 16	Round of 32	Q	Q3	Q2	Q1
Singles	250	150	90	45	20	0	12	6	0	0
Doubles	250	150	90	45	0	—	—	—	—	—

=== Prize money ===
Event	W	F	SF	QF	Round of 16	Round of 32	Q3	Q2	Q1
Singles	$91,050	$47,950	$25,975	$14,800	$8,720	$5,165	$835	$400	$0
Doubles	$27,660	$14,540	$7,880	$4,510	$2,640	—	—	—	—
Doubles prize money per team

== Singles main draw entrants ==
=== Seeds ===
Country	Player	Rank^{1}	Seed
ESP	Rafael Nadal	3	1
ESP	Tommy Robredo	18	2
URU	Pablo Cuevas	23	3
ITA	Fabio Fognini	28	4
ARG	Leonardo Mayer	30	5
CZE	Jiří Veselý	44	6
ESP	Pablo Andújar	50	7
ESP	Pablo Carreño Busta	55	8

- Rankings are as of February 16, 2015.

=== Other entrants ===
The following players received wildcards into the main draw:

- (Argentina) Guido Andreozzi
- (Argentina) Renzo Olivo
- (Argentina) Horacio Zeballos

The following players received entry from the qualifying draw:

- (Argentina) Facundo Argüello
- (Argentina) Facundo Bagnis
- (Italy) Marco Cecchinato
- (Argentina) Andrés Molteni

=== Retirements ===
- (Spain) Pablo Carreño Busta (illness)

== Doubles main draw entrants ==
=== Seeds ===
Country	Player	Country	Player	Rank^{1}	Seed
URU	Pablo Cuevas	ESP	David Marrero	74	1
ARG	Máximo González	ARG	Horacio Zeballos	147	2
SWE	Johan Brunström	USA	Nicholas Monroe	150	3
CZE	František Čermák	CZE	Jiří Veselý	163	4

- ^{1} Rankings are as of February 16, 2015.

=== Other entrants ===
The following pairs received wildcards into the main draw:

- (Argentina) Facundo Argüello / (Argentina) Pedro Cachin
- (Argentina) Federico Delbonis / (Argentina) Andrés Molteni

=== Withdrawals ===
During the tournament

- (Italy) Fabio Fognini (illness)

== Finals ==
=== Singles ===
- (Spain) Rafael Nadal defeated (Argentina) Juan Mónaco, 6–4, 6–1

=== Doubles ===
- (Finland) Jarkko Nieminen / (Brazil) André Sá defeated (Spain) Pablo Andújar / (Austria) Oliver Marach, 4–6, 6–4, [10–7]
