= 2012 Copa Claro – Doubles =

Doubles
- 2012 Copa Claro

Final
- Champions: (Spain) David Marrero (Spain) Fernando Verdasco
- Runners-up: (Slovakia) Michal Mertiňák (Brazil) André Sá
- Score: 6–4, 6–4

Events
Singles	Doubles
← 2011 ·	Copa Claro	· 2013 →

Oliver Marach and Leonardo Mayer were the defending champions but decided not to participate.
David Marrero and Fernando Verdasco won the title after defeating Michal Mertiňák and André Sá 6–4, 6–4 in the final.

== Seeds ==
1. (Italy) Daniele Bracciali / (Italy) Potito Starace (quarterfinals)
2. (Slovakia) Michal Mertiňák / (Brazil) André Sá (final)
3. (Spain) Pablo Andújar / (Argentina) Carlos Berlocq (quarterfinals)
4. (Spain) Pere Riba / (Brazil) João Souza (quarterfinals)

== Draw ==
=== Key ===
- Q = Qualifier
- WC = Wild card
- LL = Lucky loser
- Alt = Alternate
- SE = Special exempt
- PR = Protected ranking
- ITF = ITF entry
- JE = Junior exempt
- w/o = Walkover
- r = Retired
- d = Defaulted
- SR = Special ranking

=== Draw ===
First round
1	(Italy) D Bracciali (Italy) P Starace	2	6	[10]
(Argentina) M González (Japan) K Nishikori	6	2	[7]
WC	(Argentina) F Argüello (Argentina) A Velotti	4	6	[8]
(France) É Prodon (Argentina) H Zeballos	6	2	[10]
3	(Spain) P Andújar (Argentina) C Berlocq	6	2	[10]
(France) B Paire (Switzerland) S Wawrinka	0	6	[7]
WC	(Argentina) F Delbonis (Argentina) D Junqueira	5	4
(Spain) D Marrero (Spain) F Verdasco	7	6
(Portugal) R Machado (Spain) R Ramírez Hidalgo	3	6	[10]
Alt	(Serbia) N Ćirić (Uruguay) M Felder	6	3	[7]
(Spain) D Ferrer (Spain) D Gimeno-Traver	1	6^{7}
4	(Spain) P Riba (Brazil) J Souza	6	7^{9}
(France) J Chardy (France) G Simon	6	6
(Chile) P Capdeville (Argentina) E Schwank	2	2
(Italy) S Bolelli (Italy) F Volandri	3	4
2	(Slovakia) M Mertiňák (Brazil) A Sá	6	6

Quarterfinals
1	(Italy) D Bracciali (Italy) P Starace	6	3	[10]
(France) É Prodon (Argentina) H Zeballos	1	6	[12]
3	(Spain) P Andújar (Argentina) C Berlocq	6	3	[8]
(Spain) D Marrero (Spain) F Verdasco	4	6	[10]
(Portugal) R Machado (Spain) R Ramírez Hidalgo	6	6
4	(Spain) P Riba (Brazil) J Souza	4	1
(France) J Chardy (France) G Simon	6^{5}	3
2	(Slovakia) M Mertiňák (Brazil) A Sá	7^{7}	6

Semifinals
(France) É Prodon (Argentina) H Zeballos	6^{5}	3
(Spain) D Marrero (Spain) F Verdasco	7^{7}	6
(Portugal) R Machado (Spain) R Ramírez Hidalgo	5	6	[5]
2	(Slovakia) M Mertiňák (Brazil) A Sá	7	4	[10]

Final
(Spain) D Marrero (Spain) F Verdasco	6	6
2	(Slovakia) M Mertiňák (Brazil) A Sá	4	4
