= 2015 Argentina Open – Singles =

Singles
- 2015 Argentina Open

Final
- Champion: (Spain) Rafael Nadal
- Runner-up: (Argentina) Juan Mónaco
- Score: 6–4, 6–1

Details
- Draw: 28
- Seeds: 8

Events
Singles	Doubles
- Argentina Open

David Ferrer was the three-time defending champion, but he chose to compete in Acapulco instead.
Rafael Nadal won the title, defeating Juan Mónaco in the final, 6–4, 6–1.

== Seeds ==
1. (Spain) Rafael Nadal (champion)
2. (Spain) Tommy Robredo (quarterfinals)
3. (Uruguay) Pablo Cuevas (quarterfinals)
4. (Italy) Fabio Fognini (second round)
5. (Argentina) Leonardo Mayer (second round)
6. (Czech Republic) Jiří Veselý (first round)
7. (Spain) Pablo Andújar (first round)
8. (Spain) Pablo Carreño Busta (first round, retired)

== Draw ==
Key

- Q = Qualifier
- WC = Wild card
- LL = Lucky loser
- Alt = Alternate
- ITF = ITF entry
- PR = Protected ranking
- SR = Special ranking
- SE = Special exempt
- JE = Junior exempt
- JR = Junior Accelerator Programme entrant
- CO = College Accelerator Programme entrant
- NG = Next Gen Accelerator Program entrant
- w/o = Walkover
- r = Retired
- d = Defaulted

=== Finals ===
Semifinals
1	(Spain) Rafael Nadal	7^{9}	6
(Argentina) Carlos Berlocq	6^{7}	2
(Argentina) Juan Mónaco	6	6^{6}	6
(Spain) Nicolás Almagro	3	7^{8}	4

Final
1	(Spain) Rafael Nadal	6	6
(Argentina) Juan Mónaco	4	1

=== Top half ===
First round
Q	(Argentina) F Argüello	6	6
(Spain) A Montañés	3	2
(Italy) P Lorenzi	6	6^{5}	6
(Brazil) T Bellucci	4	7^{7}	1
(Argentina) F Delbonis	7^{7}	3
8	(Spain) P Carreño Busta	6^{2}	0^{r}
(Argentina) D Schwartzman	3	3
(Argentina) C Berlocq	6	6
Q	(Italy) M Cecchinato	6	5	3
Q	(Argentina) F Bagnis	4	7	6
(Slovenia) B Rola	6	6
6	(Czech Republic) J Veselý	4	3

Second round
1	(Spain) R Nadal	6	6
Q	(Argentina) F Argüello	4	0
(Italy) P Lorenzi	4	2
(Argentina) F Delbonis	6	6
4	(Italy) F Fognini	3	0
(Argentina) C Berlocq	6	6
Q	(Argentina) F Bagnis	2	1
(Slovenia) B Rola	6	6

Quarterfinals
1	(Spain) R Nadal	6	6
(Argentina) F Delbonis	1	1
(Argentina) C Berlocq	6	6
(Slovenia) B Rola	1	3

Semifinals
1	(Spain) R Nadal	7^{9}	6
(Argentina) C Berlocq	6^{7}	2

=== Bottom half ===
First round
5	(Argentina) L Mayer	6	6
PR	(France) S Robert	0	1
(Argentina) M González	2	2
(Argentina) J Mónaco	6	6
WC	(Argentina) G Andreozzi	6	6
Q	(Argentina) A Molteni	2	2
7	(Spain) P Andújar	3	6	2
(Spain) N Almagro	6	3	6
WC	(Argentina) H Zeballos	4	1
(Spain) A Ramos-Viñolas	6	6
(Finland) J Nieminen	6^{3}	7	0
WC	(Argentina) R Olivo	7^{7}	5	6

Second round
5	(Argentina) L Mayer	4	4
(Argentina) J Mónaco	6	6
WC	(Argentina) G Andreozzi	6^{4}	1
3	(Uruguay) P Cuevas	7^{7}	6
(Spain) N Almagro	6	6
(Spain) A Ramos-Viñolas	3	4
WC	(Argentina) R Olivo	1	2
2	(Spain) T Robredo	6	6

Quarterfinals
(Argentina) J Mónaco	7^{7}	6^{4}	6
3	(Uruguay) P Cuevas	6^{1}	7^{7}	4
(Spain) N Almagro	6	6
2	(Spain) T Robredo	3	2

Semifinals
(Argentina) J Mónaco	6	6^{6}	6
(Spain) N Almagro	3	7^{8}	4

== Qualifying ==
=== Seeds ===
1. (Argentina) Facundo Bagnis (qualified)
2. (Argentina) Facundo Argüello (qualified)
3. (Spain) Roberto Carballés Baena (second round)
4. (Italy) Marco Cecchinato (qualified)
5. (Argentina) Guido Pella (first round)
6. (Chile) Nicolás Jarry (first round)
7. (Argentina) Marco Trungelliti (first round)
8. (Chile) Gonzalo Lama (second round)

=== Qualifiers ===
1. (Argentina) Facundo Bagnis
2. (Argentina) Facundo Argüello
3. (Argentina) Andrés Molteni
4. (Italy) Marco Cecchinato

=== Qualifying draw ===
==== First qualifier ====
First round
1	(Argentina) Facundo Bagnis	6	6
(Argentina) Luciano Doria	1	0
(Argentina) Juan Pablo Paz	4	4
(Argentina) Agustín Velotti	6	6
(Italy) Gianluigi Quinzi	6	6
(Brazil) Rogério Dutra Silva	4	4
(Brazil) Thiago Monteiro	7^{7}	3	6
5	(Argentina) Guido Pella	6^{1}	6	2

Second round
1	(Argentina) Facundo Bagnis	4	6	6
(Argentina) Agustín Velotti	6	2	4
(Italy) Gianluigi Quinzi	3	4
(Brazil) Thiago Monteiro	6	6

Qualifying competition
1	(Argentina) Facundo Bagnis	7	5	6
(Brazil) Thiago Monteiro	5	7	2

==== Second qualifier ====
First round
2	(Argentina) Facundo Argüello	6	6
(Argentina) Franco Feitt	1	1
(South Korea) Kim Young-seok	6	3	6^{7}
(Bolivia) Hugo Dellien	1	6	7^{9}
WC	(Argentina) Juan Ignacio Iliev	1	0
(Brazil) Guilherme Clezar	6	6
(Argentina) Andrea Collarini	6	7
6	(Chile) Nicolás Jarry	3	5

Second round
2	(Argentina) Facundo Argüello	6	3
(Bolivia) Hugo Dellien	3	1^{r}
(Brazil) Guilherme Clezar	5	3
(Argentina) Andrea Collarini	7	6

Qualifying competition
2	(Argentina) Facundo Argüello	4	6	6
(Argentina) Andrea Collarini	6	2	1

==== Third qualifier ====
First round
3	(Spain) Roberto Carballés Baena	6	6
(Argentina) Hernán Casanova	2	1
(Argentina) Andrés Molteni	6	3	6
(Argentina) Pedro Cachin	1	6	4
(Argentina) Matías Rodolfo Buchhass	2^{r}
(Italy) Filippo Volandri	3
WC	(Argentina) Mauricio Pérez Mota	3	3
8	(Chile) Gonzalo Lama	6	6

Second round
3	(Spain) Roberto Carballés Baena	2	6	6^{4}
(Argentina) Andrés Molteni	6	4	7^{7}
(Italy) Filippo Volandri	6	6
8	(Chile) Gonzalo Lama	0	3

Qualifying competition
(Argentina) Andrés Molteni	2	7	0
(Italy) Filippo Volandri	6	5	0^{r}

==== Fourth qualifier ====
First round
4	(Italy) Marco Cecchinato	6	6
WC	(Argentina) Martín Rondina	0	2
(Chile) Christian Garín	6	3
(Argentina) Martín Alund	3	0^{r}
(Argentina) Juan Miguel Matute	3	7	2
WC	(Argentina) Francisco Bahamonde	6	5	6
(Argentina) Guillermo Durán	6	6
7	(Argentina) Marco Trungelliti	3	1

Second round
4	(Italy) Marco Cecchinato	7	6
(Chile) Christian Garín	5	1
WC	(Argentina) Francisco Bahamonde	0	6	3
(Argentina) Guillermo Durán	6	4	6

Qualifying competition
4	(Italy) Marco Cecchinato	6	7^{7}
(Argentina) Guillermo Durán	1	6^{0}
