= 2013 Copa Claro – Doubles =

Doubles
- 2013 Copa Claro

Final
- Champions: (Italy) Simone Bolelli (Italy) Fabio Fognini
- Runners-up: (United States) Nicholas Monroe (Germany) Simon Stadler
- Score: 6–3, 6–2

Events
Singles	Doubles
← 2012 ·	Copa Claro	· 2014 →

David Marrero and Fernando Verdasco were the defending champions but decided not to participate.
Simone Bolelli and Fabio Fognini won the title, defeating Nicholas Monroe and Simon Stadler in the final, 6–3, 6–2.

== Seeds ==
1. (Czech Republic) František Čermák / (Slovakia) Michal Mertiňák (quarterfinals)
2. (Italy) Daniele Bracciali / (Czech Republic) Lukáš Dlouhý (quarterfinals)
3. (Austria) Oliver Marach / (Argentina) Horacio Zeballos (semifinals)
4. (Germany) Dustin Brown / (Germany) Christopher Kas (quarterfinals)

== Draw ==
=== Key ===
- Q = Qualifier
- WC = Wild card
- LL = Lucky loser
- Alt = Alternate
- SE = Special exempt
- PR = Protected ranking
- ITF = ITF entry
- JE = Junior exempt
- w/o = Walkover
- r = Retired
- d = Defaulted
- SR = Special ranking

=== Draw ===
First round
1	(Czech Republic) F Čermák (Slovakia) M Mertiňák	6	6
(Spain) D Gimeno-Traver (Spain) A Ramos	1	2
WC	(Argentina) R Olivo (Argentina) M Trungelliti	4	4
(Italy) S Bolelli (Italy) F Fognini	6	6
3	(Austria) O Marach (Argentina) H Zeballos	6	7^{7}
WC	(Argentina) M Alund (Argentina) G Pella	3	6^{5}
(Italy) P Lorenzi (Italy) F Volandri	2	4
(Argentina) C Berlocq (Argentina) L Mayer	6	6
(United States) N Monroe (Germany) S Stadler	6	6
(Italy) F Cipolla (Italy) P Starace	3	4
(Uruguay) M Felder (Portugal) J Sousa	5	2
4	(Germany) D Brown (Germany) C Kas	7	6
(Spain) P Andújar (Spain) G García-López
(Slovenia) A Bedene (Russia) A Kuznetsov	w/o
PR	(Argentina) L Arnold Ker (Brazil) R Dutra da Silva	2	6	[9]
2	(Italy) D Bracciali (Czech Republic) L Dlouhý	6	0	[11]

Quarterfinals
1	(Czech Republic) F Čermák (Slovakia) M Mertiňák	4	2
(Italy) S Bolelli (Italy) F Fognini	6	6
3	(Austria) O Marach (Argentina) H Zeballos	6	6^{5}	[10]
(Argentina) C Berlocq (Argentina) L Mayer	4	7^{7}	[6]
(United States) N Monroe (Germany) S Stadler	7^{7}	6
4	(Germany) D Brown (Germany) C Kas	6^{4}	4
(Slovenia) A Bedene (Russia) A Kuznetsov	6	6
2	(Italy) D Bracciali (Czech Republic) L Dlouhý	4	3

Semifinals
(Italy) S Bolelli (Italy) F Fognini	7^{7}	7^{7}
3	(Austria) O Marach (Argentina) H Zeballos	6^{2}	6^{2}
(United States) N Monroe (Germany) S Stadler	6	6
(Slovenia) A Bedene (Russia) A Kuznetsov	4	4

Final
(Italy) S Bolelli (Italy) F Fognini	6	6
(United States) N Monroe (Germany) S Stadler	3	2
