= Simon Stadler =

German tennis player

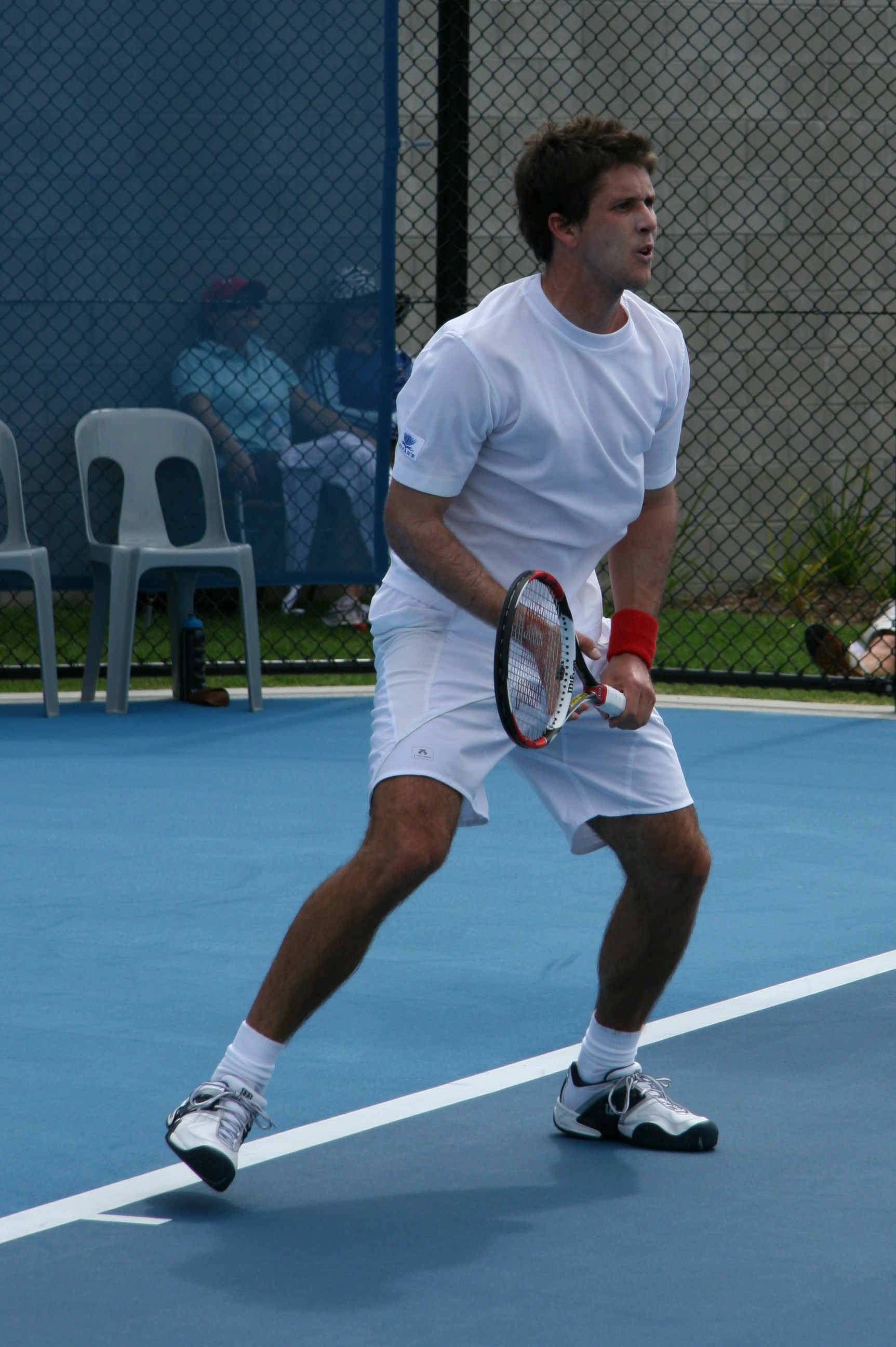
- Country (sports): Germany
- Residence: Heidelberg, Germany
- Born: 20 July 1983 (age 42) Heidelberg, West Germany
- Height: 1.83 m (6 ft 0 in)
- Turned pro: 2002
- Retired: 2016
- Plays: Left-handed (two-handed backhand)
- Prize money: $593,657

Singles
- Career record: 6–10
- Career titles: 0
- Highest ranking: No. 140 (23 February 2009)

Grand Slam singles results
- Australian Open: 1R (2011)
- French Open: Q2 (2007, 2008)
- Wimbledon: 3R (2008)
- US Open: Q3 (2008)

Doubles
- Career record: 16–28
- Career titles: 1
- Highest ranking: No. 52 (17 February 2014)

Grand Slam doubles results
- Australian Open: 2R (2014)
- French Open: 2R (2014)
- Wimbledon: 2R (2013)
- US Open: 1R (2013)

Simon Stadler (German pronunciation: [ˈziːmɔn ˈʃtaːdlɐ]; born 20 July 1983 in Heidelberg, West Germany) is a German retired professional left-handed tennis player. He reached his career-high singles ranking of world No. 140 in February 2009 and his career-high doubles ranking of world No. 52 in February 2014.

== Juniors career ==
Stadler reached a career-high of No. 8 in singles in February 2001 and No. 14 in doubles in January 2001.

== Professional career ==
=== 2008 ===
After a slow start to the year, Stadler reached Challenger semifinals two weeks in a row in Cremona and Athens to reach his career-high ranking of No. 164 in April. He reached another semifinal in Telde in May.

In June, Stadler qualified in singles for the 2008 Wimbledon Championships, beating British junior No. 949 Daniel Cox (a week after Cox knocked off No. 67 Thomaz Bellucci), No. 248 Rainer Eitzinger and No. 270 Nicolás Todero. He took this form into the main singles draw, where he faced the 18th seed Ivo Karlović from Croatia and beat him in four sets. He then defeated the aforementioned Brazilian, Thomaz Bellucci in the second round, 8–6 in the fifth. He would go on to lose to Cypriot Marcos Baghdatis in the third round.

== ATP career finals ==
=== Doubles: 3 (1–2) ===
Winner – Legend Grand Slam Tournaments (0–0) ATP World Tour Finals (0–0) ATP World Tour Masters 1000 (0–0) ATP World Tour 500 Series (0–0) ATP World Tour 250 Series (1–2)	Titles by surface Hard (0–0) Clay (1–2) Grass (0–0) Carpet (0–0)

Result	W–L	Date	Tournament	Surface	Partner	Opponents	Score
Loss	0–1	Feb 2013	Copa Claro, Buenos Aires, Argentina	Clay	(United States) Nicholas Monroe	(Italy) Simone Bolelli (Italy) Fabio Fognini	3–6, 2–6
Win	1–1	Jul 2013	Swedish Open, Båstad, Sweden	Clay	(United States) Nicholas Monroe	(Argentina) Carlos Berlocq (Spain) Albert Ramos	6–2, 3–6, [10–3]
Loss	1–2	Jul 2013	ATP Vegeta Croatia Open Umag, Umag, Croatia	Clay	(United States) Nicholas Monroe	(Slovakia) Martin Kližan (Spain) David Marrero	1–6, 7–5, [7–10]

== Performance timelines ==
Key
W	F	SF	QF	#R	RR	Q#	DNQ	A	NH

(W) winner; (F) finalist; (SF) semifinalist; (QF) quarterfinalist; (#R) rounds 4, 3, 2, 1; (RR) round-robin stage; (Q#) qualification round; (DNQ) did not qualify; (A) absent; (NH) not held; (SR) strike rate (events won / competed); (W–L) win–loss record.

=== Singles ===
Tournament	2006	2007	2008	2009	2010	2011	W–L
Grand Slam tournaments
Australian Open	A	Q2	Q3	Q3	Q3	1R	0–1
French Open	A	Q2	Q2	Q1	Q1	Q1	0–0
Wimbledon	1R	Q3	3R	A	A	Q2	2–2
US Open	A	Q1	Q3	Q1	Q1	A	0–0
Win–loss	0–1	0–0	2–1	0–0	0–0	0–1	2–3

=== Doubles ===
Tournament	2001	2002	2003	2004	2005	2006	2007	2008	2009	2010	2011	2012	2013	2014	2015	2016	W–L
Grand Slam tournaments
Australian Open	A	A	A	A	A	A	A	A	A	A	A	A	1R	2R	A	A	1–2
French Open	A	A	A	A	A	A	A	A	A	A	A	A	A	2R	A	A	1–1
Wimbledon	A	A	A	A	A	A	A	A	A	A	A	Q1	2R	1R	A	A	1–2
US Open	A	A	A	A	A	A	A	A	A	A	A	A	1R	A	A	A	0–1
Win–loss	0–0	0–0	0–0	0–0	0–0	0–0	0–0	0–0	0–0	0–0	0–0	0–0	1–3	2–3	0–0	0–0	3–6
Career statistics
Titles / Finals	0 / 0	0 / 0	0 / 0	0 / 0	0 / 0	0 / 0	0 / 0	0 / 0	0 / 0	0 / 0	0 / 0	0 / 0	1 / 3	0 / 0	0 / 0	0 / 0	1 / 3
Overall win–loss	0–1	0–1	0–0	0–0	0–0	0–0	0–0	1–1	0–0	0–0	0–0	1–1	11–14	3–9	0–0	0–1	16–28
Year-end ranking	780	250	791	1012	576	693	433	398	370	322	151	85	61	271	777	385	
