= Grigor Dimitrov career statistics =

Career finals
Discipline	Type	Won	Lost	Total	WR
Singles	Grand Slam	–	–	–	–
Singles	ATP Finals	1	–	1	1.00
Singles	ATP 1000	1	2	3	0.33
Singles	ATP 500	1	2	3	0.33
Singles	ATP 250	6	8	14	0.46
Singles	Olympics	–	–	–	–
Singles	Total	9	12	21	0.47
Doubles	Grand Slam	–	–	–	–
Doubles	ATP Finals	–	–	–	–
Doubles	ATP 1000	–	–	–	–
Doubles	ATP 500	–	–	–	–
Doubles	ATP 250	–	1	1	0.00
Doubles	Olympics	–	–	–	–
Doubles	Total	–	1	1	0.00
Total		9	13	22	0.45

Bulgarian professional tennis player Grigor Dimitrov has won nine ATP singles titles including at least one title on each playing surface (hard, clay and grass). Highlights of Dimitrov's career thus far include winning the 2017 Cincinnati Masters 1000 crown, final appearances at the 2023 Paris Masters and at the 2024 Miami Open, semifinal appearances at the 2014 Wimbledon Championships, 2017 Australian Open, 2019 US Open as well as in Masters 1000 events (2014 Rome, 2014 Canada, 2016 Cincinnati, 2018 Monte Carlo, 2019 Paris, 2021 Indian Wells and 2022 Monte Carlo, 2023 Shanghai). By virtue of winning the 2017 ATP Finals, going an undefeated 5–0, Dimitrov achieved a career high singles ranking of world No. 3 on 20 November 2017.

== Career achievements ==
Dimitrov began the 2013 season by reaching his first career singles final at the Brisbane International where he lost in straight sets to the defending champion, Andy Murray. During the clay court season, Dimitrov reached his first top-level quarterfinal at the Monte Carlo Rolex Masters where he lost in three sets to the eight-time defending champion, Rafael Nadal in three sets before achieving his first win over a reigning world No. 1 by defeating Novak Djokovic in the second round of the Mutua Madrid Open In October of the same year, Dimitrov won his first ATP singles title at the If Stockholm Open, defeating defending champion David Ferrer in three sets.

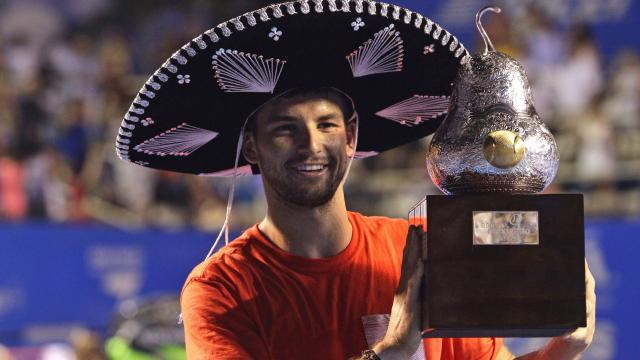
Dimitrov following his victory at the 2014 Abierto Mexicano Telcel.

The following year, Dimitrov reached his first grand slam quarterfinal at the Australian Open, where he lost to the world No. 1 Rafael Nadal in four sets after failing to convert on three set points in the third set tie-break which would have given him a two sets to one lead. In March, Dimitrov won the biggest ATP singles title of his career thus far by winning the ATP 500 event in Acapulco, defeating Kevin Anderson in the final in three sets before claiming his first career title on clay in Bucharest the following month after a straight sets victory over the defending champion, Lukáš Rosol in the final. At the Internazionali BNL d'Italia, Dimitrov reached his first ATP Masters 1000 semifinal but lost in straight sets to the defending champion Nadal. In June, Dimitrov saved a championship point against Feliciano López during the final of the Queen's Club Championships to win his third title of the year and first career title on grass. In doing so, Dimitrov has now won at least one title on each playing surface (hard, clay and grass). At the 2014 Wimbledon Championships, Dimitrov upset the third seeded defending champion, Andy Murray in the quarterfinals in straight sets to reach his first grand slam semi-final where he lost in four sets to the top seed and eventual champion, Novak Djokovic. As a result of his performance at this event, Dimitrov entered the top ten of the ATP rankings for the first time in his career, achieving a then career high singles ranking of world No. 9.

The 2017 season was, by far, the most successful of his career. He won 4 Tour titles (matching the number of Tour titles he won from 2011 through 2016), he won his first Masters 1000 crown, qualified for the 2017 ATP Finals where he went a perfect 5–0 and won the event, amassed earnings of $5,628,512 (previous best was $2,795,409 in 2014), racked up eight top-10 wins (previous best was four in 2014), and finished as the year-end No. 3 ranked player in the world (previous best was No. 11 in 2014).

== Performance timelines ==
Key
W	F	SF	QF	#R	RR	Q#	P#	DNQ	A	Z#	PO	G	S	B	NMS	NTI	P	NH

(W) winner; (F) finalist; (SF) semifinalist; (QF) quarterfinalist; (#R) rounds 4, 3, 2, 1; (RR) round-robin stage; (Q#) qualification round; (P#) preliminary round; (DNQ) did not qualify; (A) absent; (Z#) Davis/Fed Cup Zonal Group (with number indication) or (PO) play-off; (G) gold, (S) silver or (B) bronze Olympic/Paralympic medal; (NMS) not a Masters tournament; (NTI) not a Tier I tournament; (P) postponed; (NH) not held; (SR) strike rate (events won / competed); (W–L) win–loss record.
To avoid confusion and double counting, these charts are updated at the conclusion of a tournament or when the player's participation has ended.

=== Singles ===
Tournament	2008	2009	2010	2011	2012	2013	2014	2015	2016	2017	2018	2019	2020	2021	2022	2023	2024	2025	2026	SR	W–L	Win %
Grand Slam tournaments
Australian Open	A	A	Q1	2R	2R	1R	QF	4R	3R	SF	QF	4R	2R	QF	2R	3R	3R	1R	1R	0 / 16	33–16	67%
French Open	A	A	A	1R	2R	3R	1R	1R	1R	3R	3R	3R	4R	1R	3R	4R	QF	1R	Q1	0 / 15	21–15	58%
Wimbledon	A	1R	A	2R	2R	2R	SF	3R	3R	4R	1R	1R	NH	2R	1R	4R	4R	4R	4R	0 / 16	28–16	64%
US Open	A	Q2	A	1R	1R	1R	4R	2R	4R	2R	1R	SF	2R	2R	2R	3R	QF	A	1R	0 / 15	21–15	58%
Win–loss	0–0	0–1	0–0	2–4	3–4	3–4	12–4	6–4	7–4	11–4	6–4	9–4	5–3	6–4	4–4	10–4	13–4	3–3	3–3	0 / 62	103–62	62%
National representation
Summer Olympics	A	NH			2R	NH			1R	NH				A	NH		A	NH		0 / 2	1–2	33%
Davis Cup	RR	2R	2R	A	RR	1R	1R	3R	A	A	A	A	NH	A	A	A	A	A		0 / 7	16–1	94%
Year-end championships
ATP Finals	DNQ									W	DNQ						Alt	DNQ		1 / 1	5–0	100%
ATP 1000 tournaments
Indian Wells Open	A	A	A	A	2R	3R	3R	3R	2R	3R	2R	A	NH	SF	QF	2R	4R	4R	2R	0 / 13	17–13	57%
Miami Open	A	A	A	1R	4R	3R	3R	3R	4R	2R	3R	3R	NH	2R	2R	3R	F	SF	1R	0 / 15	20–15	57%
Monte-Carlo Masters	A	A	A	A	Q2	QF	3R	QF	2R	2R	SF	3R	NH	3R	SF	2R	3R	QF	1R	0 / 13	26–13	67%
Madrid Open	Q1	A	A	A	A	3R	3R	QF	1R	3R	2R	1R	NH	1R	3R	3R	2R	4R	1R	0 / 13	14–13	52%
Italian Open	A	A	A	A	A	2R	SF	2R	1R	1R	2R	1R	QF	1R	2R	3R	4R	2R	A	0 / 13	13–13	50%
Canadian Open	A	A	A	A	Q1	1R	SF	2R	QF	3R	QF	1R	NH	2R	2R	A	3R	A	A	0 / 10	12–10	55%
Cincinnati Open	A	A	A	2R	Q1	3R	2R	3R	SF	W	3R	1R	2R	3R	1R	1R	2R	A	1R	1 / 14	18–13	58%
Shanghai Masters	A	A	A	2R	2R	1R	2R	A	2R	QF	A	A	NH			SF	4R	A	A	0 / 8	12–8	60%
Paris Masters	A	A	A	A	2R	3R	3R	3R	3R	3R	3R	SF	A	3R	3R	F	QF	2R	Q1	0 / 13	25–12	68%
Win–loss	0–0	0–0	0–0	2–3	6–4	12–9	15–9	14–8	12–9	12–8	8–8	7–7	4–2	10–8	13–8	13–8	16–9	12–5	1–5	1 / 112	157–110	59%
Career statistics
	2008	2009	2010	2011	2012	2013	2014	2015	2016	2017	2018	2019	2020	2021	2022	2023	2024	2025	2026	Career		
Tournaments	1	6	1	25	19	24	21	22	26	23	19	21	11	18	22	22	19	12	11	Career total: 316		
Titles	0	0	0	0	0	1	3	0	0	4	0	0	0	0	0	0	1	0	0	Career total: 9		
Finals	0	0	0	0	0	2	4	0	3	5	1	0	0	0	0	2	4	0	0	Career total: 21		
Overall win–loss	0–1	4–6	3–2	18–25	24–19	37–23	50–18	33–22	39–26	49–19	25–19	22–21	18–11	24–18	26–22	41–21	46–18	18–11	7–11	9 / 317	481–312	61%
Win %	0%	40%	60%	42%	56%	62%	74%	60%	60%	72%	57%	51%	62%	57%	54%	66%	72%	62%	29%	Career total: 61%		
Year-end ranking	493	288	106	76	48	23	11	28	17	3	19	20	19	28	28	14	10	44		$31,844,777		

=== Doubles ===
Tournament	2011	2012	2013	...	SR	W–L
Grand Slam tournaments
Australian Open	A	A	3R		0 / 1	2–1
French Open	A	1R	2R		0 / 2	1–2
Wimbledon	2R	A	2R		0 / 2	2–2
US Open	1R	A	A		0 / 1	0–1
Win–loss	1–2	0–1	4–3		0 / 6	5–6

== Significant finals ==
=== Year-end championships ===
==== Singles: 1 (1 title) ====
Result	Year	Tournament	Surface	Opponent	Score
Win	2017	ATP Finals, United Kingdom	Hard (i)	(Belgium) David Goffin	7–5, 4–6, 6–3

=== ATP 1000 tournaments ===
==== Singles: 3 (1 title, 2 runner-ups) ====
Result	Year	Tournament	Surface	Opponent	Score
Win	2017	Cincinnati Open	Hard	(Australia) Nick Kyrgios	6–3, 7–5
Loss	2023	Paris Masters	Hard (i)	(Serbia) Novak Djokovic	4–6, 3–6
Loss	2024	Miami Open	Hard	(Italy) Jannik Sinner	3–6, 1–6

== ATP Tour finals ==
=== Singles: 21 (9 titles, 12 runner-ups) ===
Legend Grand Slam (0–0) ATP Finals (1–0) ATP 1000 (1–2) ATP 500 (1–2) ATP 250 (6–8)	Finals by surface Hard (7–10) Clay (1–2) Grass (1–0)	Finals by setting Outdoor (6–6) Indoor (3–6)

Result	W–L	Date	Tournament	Tier	Surface	Opponent	Score
Loss	0–1	Jan 2013	Brisbane International, Australia	ATP 250	Hard	(United Kingdom) Andy Murray	6–7^{(0–7)}, 4–6
Win	1–1	Oct 2013	Stockholm Open, Sweden	ATP 250	Hard (i)	(Spain) David Ferrer	2–6, 6–3, 6–4
Win	2–1	Mar 2014	Mexican Open, Mexico	ATP 500	Hard	(South Africa) Kevin Anderson	7–6^{(7–1)}, 3–6, 7–6^{(7–5)}
Win	3–1	Apr 2014	Romanian Open, Romania	ATP 250	Clay	(Czech Republic) Lukáš Rosol	7–6^{(7–2)}, 6–1
Win	4–1	Jun 2014	Queen's Club Championships, United Kingdom	ATP 250	Grass	(Spain) Feliciano López	6–7^{(8–10)}, 7–6^{(7–1)}, 7–6^{(8–6)}
Loss	4–2	Oct 2014	Stockholm Open, Sweden	ATP 250	Hard (i)	(Czech Republic) Tomáš Berdych	7–5, 4–6, 4–6
Loss	4–3	Jan 2016	Sydney International, Australia	ATP 250	Hard	(Serbia) Viktor Troicki	6–2, 1–6, 6–7^{(7–9)}
Loss	4–4	May 2016	Istanbul Open, Turkey	ATP 250	Clay	(Argentina) Diego Schwartzman	7–6^{(7–5)}, 6–7^{(4–7)}, 0–6
Loss	4–5	Oct 2016	China Open, China	ATP 500	Hard	(United Kingdom) Andy Murray	4–6, 6–7^{(2–7)}
Win	5–5	Jan 2017	Brisbane International, Australia	ATP 250	Hard	(Japan) Kei Nishikori	6–2, 2–6, 6–3
Win	6–5	Feb 2017	Sofia Open, Bulgaria	ATP 250	Hard (i)	(Belgium) David Goffin	7–5, 6–4
Win	7–5	Aug 2017	Cincinnati Open, United States	ATP 1000	Hard	(Australia) Nick Kyrgios	6–3, 7–5
Loss	7–6	Oct 2017	Stockholm Open, Sweden	ATP 250	Hard (i)	(Argentina) Juan Martín del Potro	4–6, 2–6
Win	8–6	Nov 2017	ATP Finals, United Kingdom	Finals	Hard (i)	(Belgium) David Goffin	7–5, 4–6, 6–3
Loss	8–7	Feb 2018	Rotterdam Open, Netherlands	ATP 500	Hard (i)	(Switzerland) Roger Federer	2–6, 2–6
Loss	8–8	May 2023	Geneva Open, Switzerland	ATP 250	Clay	(Chile) Nicolás Jarry	6–7^{(1–7)}, 1–6
Loss	8–9	Nov 2023	Paris Masters, France	ATP 1000	Hard (i)	(Serbia) Novak Djokovic	4–6, 3–6
Win	9–9	Jan 2024	Brisbane International, Australia (2)	ATP 250	Hard	(Denmark) Holger Rune	7–6^{(7–5)}, 6–4
Loss	9–10	Feb 2024	Open 13, France	ATP 250	Hard (i)	(France) Ugo Humbert	4–6, 3–6
Loss	9–11	Mar 2024	Miami Open, United States	ATP 1000	Hard	(Italy) Jannik Sinner	3–6, 1–6
Loss	9–12	Oct 2024	Stockholm Open, Sweden	ATP 250	Hard (i)	(United States) Tommy Paul	4–6, 3–6

=== Doubles: 1 (1 runner-up) ===
Legend Grand Slam (0–0) ATP Finals (0–0) ATP 1000 (0–0) ATP 500 (0–0) ATP 250 (0–1)	Finals by surface Hard (0–0) Clay (0–0) Grass (0–1)	Finals by setting Outdoor (0–1) Indoor (0–0)

Result	W–L	Date	Tournament	Tier	Surface	Partner	Opponents	Score
Loss	0–1	Jun 2011	Eastbourne International, United Kingdom	ATP 250	Grass	(Italy) Andreas Seppi	(Israel) Jonathan Erlich (Israel) Andy Ram	3–6, 3–6

== ATP Challenger Tour finals ==
=== Singles: 5 (4 titles, 1 runner-up) ===
Finals by surface
Hard (3–1)
Clay (1–0)
Grass (0–0)
Carpet (0–0)

Result	W–L	Date	Tournament	Surface	Opponent	Score
Win	1–0	Aug 2010	Geneva, Switzerland	Clay	(Spain) Pablo Andújar	6–2, 4–6, 6–4
Win	2–0	Sep 2010	Bangkok, Thailand	Hard	(Russia) Konstantin Kravchuk	6–1, 6–4
Win	3–0	Sep 2010	Bangkok II, Thailand	Hard	(Russia) Alexandre Kudryavtsev	6–4, 6–1
Loss	3–1	Oct 2010	Orléans, France	Hard (i)	(France) Nicolas Mahut	6–2, 6–7^{(6–8)}, 6–7^{(4–7)}
Win	4–1	Mar 2011	Cherbourg, France	Hard (i)	(France) Nicolas Mahut	6–2, 7–6^{(7–4)}

=== Doubles: 2 (1 title, 1 runner-up) ===
Result	W–L	Date	Tournament	Surface	Partner	Opponents	Score
Loss	0–1	Aug 2009	Istanbul, Turkey	Hard	(Turkey) Marsel İlhan	(Portugal) Frederico Gil (Sweden) Filip Prpic	6–3, 2–6, [6–10]
Win	1–1	Sep 2009	Trnava, Slovakia	Clay	(Russia) Teymuraz Gabashvili	(Czech Republic) Jan Minář (Czech Republic) Lukáš Rosol	6–4, 2–6, [10–8]

== ITF Futures finals ==
=== Singles: 6 (6 titles) ===
Legend ITF Futures (6–0)	Finals by surface Hard (2–0) Clay (4–0) Grass (0–0) Carpet (0–0)

Result	W–L	Date	Tournament	Tier	Surface	Opponent	Score
Win	1–0	May 2008	Spain F20, Valldoreix	Futures	Clay	(Spain) Pablo Santos	6–3, 6–4
Win	2–0	Sep 2008	Spain F34, Móstoles	Futures	Hard	(Spain) Ignacio Coll Riudavets	7–6^{(7–3)}, 6–3
Win	3–0	Sep 2008	Spain F35, Alcorcón	Futures	Hard	(France) Ludovic Walter	6–4, 6–4
Win	4–0	Jul 2010	Germany F9, Trier	Futures	Clay	(Belgium) David Goffin	4–6, 6–1, 6–4
Win	5–0	Aug 2010	Germany F10, Dortmund	Futures	Clay	(Germany) Jan-Lennard Struff	7–5, 7–5
Win	6–0	Aug 2010	Spain F29, Irun	Futures	Clay	(Spain) Sergio Gutiérrez Ferrol	4–6, 6–3, 6–4

=== Doubles: 3 (2 titles, 1 runner-up) ===
Legend ITF Futures (2–1)

Result	W–L	Date	Tournament	Tier	Surface	Partner	Opponents	Score
Loss	0–1	Jan 2008	ITF Spain, Mallorca	Futures	Clay	(Spain) Juan Albert Viloca	(France) Julien Jeanpierre (France) Xavier Pujo	5–7, 2–6
Win	1–1	Feb 2008	ITF Spain, Murcia	Futures	Clay	(Spain) Carles Poch Gradin	(Spain) Carlos González de Cueto (United States) Rhyne Williams	7–6^{(7–4)}, 6–3
Win	2–1	Jan 2009	ITF USA, Hollywood	Futures	Clay	(Bulgaria) Todor Enev	(Italy) Mattia Livraghi (Italy) Stefano Ianni	6–1, 6–2

== National and international participation ==
=== Team competitions finals: 2 (2 titles) ===
Finals by tournaments Laver Cup (2–0)	Finals by teams Europe (2–0)

Result	Date	Tournament	Surface	Team	Partner(s)	Opponent team	Opponent player(s)	Score
Win	Sep 2018	Laver Cup	Hard (i)	Team Europe	Roger Federer; Novak Djokovic; Alexander Zverev; David Goffin; Kyle Edmund	Team World	Kevin Anderson; John Isner; Diego Schwartzman; Jack Sock; Nick Kyrgios; Frances Tiafoe	13–8
Win	Sep 2024	Laver Cup	Hard (i)	Team Europe	Alexander Zverev; Carlos Alcaraz; Daniil Medvedev; Casper Ruud; Stefanos Tsitsipas	Team World	Taylor Fritz; Frances Tiafoe; Ben Shelton; Alejandro Tabilo; Francisco Cerúndolo; Thanasi Kokkinakis	13–11

=== Olympic Games (1 win, 2 losses) ===
Matches by type
Singles (1–2)

Venue	Surface	Match type	Round	Opponent player(s)	W/L	Match score
2012
London	Grass	Singles	1R	(Poland) Łukasz Kubot	Win	6–3, 7–6^{(7–4)}
London	Grass	Singles	2R	(France) Gilles Simon	Loss	3–6, 3–6
2016
Rio de Janeiro	Hard	Singles	1R	(Croatia) Marin Čilić	Loss	1–6, 4–6

=== Davis Cup (20 wins, 4 losses) ===
Grigor Dimitrov debuted for the Bulgaria Davis Cup team in 2008. Since then he has a 16–1 singles record and a 4–3 doubles record (20–4 overall).

Group membership Group II (11–4) Group III (9–0)	Matches by surface Hard (5–1) Clay (13–2) Carpet (2–1)	Matches by type Singles (16–1) Doubles (4–3)	Matches by venue Bulgaria (14–1) Away (6–3)

- ▲ ▼ indicates the result of the Davis Cup match followed by the score, date, place of event, the zonal classification and its phase, and the court surface.

Rubber result	No.	Rubber	Match type (partner if any)	Opponent nation	Opponent player(s)	Score
▲3–0; 8 April 2008; Tennis Club Lokomotiv, Plovdiv, Bulgaria; Group III Europe/Africa Round Robin; Clay surface
Victory	1	I	Singles	Montenegro	Daniel Danilović	7–5, 6–4
▲3–0; 9 April 2008; Tennis Club Lokomotiv, Plovdiv, Bulgaria; Group III Europe/Africa Round Robin; Clay surface
Victory	2	I	Singles	Ivory Coast	Charles Irie	6–1, 6–1
▲2–1; 10 April 2008; Tennis Club Lokomotiv, Plovdiv, Bulgaria; Group III Europe/Africa Round Robin; Clay surface
Victory	3	I	Singles	Madagascar	Jacob Rasolondrazana	6–3, 6–3
Victory	4	III	Doubles (with Todor Enev)	Madagascar	Tony Rajaobelina / Germain Rasolondrazana	6–1, 6–3
▲3–0; 11 April 2008; Tennis Club Lokomotiv, Plovdiv, Bulgaria; Group III Europe/Africa Round Robin; Clay surface
Victory	5	I	Singles	Turkey	Ergün Zorlu	6–0, 6–3
▲3–0; 12 April 2008; Tennis Club Lokomotiv, Plovdiv, Bulgaria; Group III Europe/Africa Round Robin; Clay surface
Victory	6	I	Singles	Zimbabwe	Takanyi Garanganga	6–3, 6–2
▲3–2; 6–8 March 2009; Egyetemi Sportcsarnok, Győr, Hungary; Group II Europe/Africa First Round; Carpet (i) surface
Victory	7	II	Singles	Hungary	Ádám Kellner	7–6^{(7–5)}, 6–4, 6–7^{(5–7)}, 7–6^{(7–5)}
Defeat	8	III	Doubles (with Todor Enev)	Hungary	Kornél Bardóczky / Róbert Varga	6–1, 2–6, 6–3, 2–6, 2–6
Victory	9	IV	Singles	Hungary	Attila Balázs	7–6^{(7–2)}, 3–6, 6–3, 3–6, 6–0
▲3–2; 5–7 March 2010; Tennis Hall Sofia, Sofia, Bulgaria; Group II Europe/Africa First Round; Hard (i) surface
Victory	10	II	Singles	Monaco	Thomas Oger	6–4, 7–5, 6–3
Victory	11	III	Doubles (with Tzvetan Mihov)	Monaco	Benjamin Balleret / Guillaume Couillard	7–5, 6–3, 6–4
Victory	12	IV	Singles	Monaco	Benjamin Balleret	6–3, 6–3, 6–1
▼0–5; 9–11 July 2010; TK Krka Otočec, Otočec, Slovenia; Group II Europe/Africa Quarterfinal; Clay surface
Defeat	13	II	Singles	Slovenia	Blaž Kavčič	6–1, 1–6, 0–6, 3–6
Defeat	14	III	Doubles (with Ivaylo Traykov)	Slovenia	Luka Gregorc / Grega Žemlja	7–6^{(7–3)}, 6–7^{(2–7)}, 6–7^{(12–14)}, 3–6
▲3–0; 2 May 2012; Bulgarian National Tennis Centre "Carlsberg", Sofia, Bulgaria; Group III Europe Round Robin; Clay surface
Victory	15	II	Singles	Albania	Flavio Deçe	6–1, 6–1
▲3–0; 4 May 2012; Bulgarian National Tennis Centre "Carlsberg", Sofia, Bulgaria; Group III Europe Round Robin; Clay surface
Victory	16	II	Singles	(Georgia (country)) Georgia	George Tsivadze	6–4, 6–1
▲3–0; 5 May 2012; Bulgarian National Tennis Centre "Carlsberg", Sofia, Bulgaria; Group III Europe Promotional Play-Off; Clay surface
Victory	17	II	Singles	(North Macedonia) Macedonia	Tomislav Jotovski	6–0, 6–0
▼2–3; 1–3 February 2013; Tennis Hall Sofia, Sofia, Bulgaria; Group II Europe/Africa First Round; Hard (i) surface
Victory	18	I	Singles	Finland	Juho Paukku	6–1, 6–1, 6–0
Defeat	19	III	Doubles (with Dimitar Kuzmanov)	Finland	Harri Heliövaara / Henri Kontinen	5–7, 1–6, 6–4, 6–2, 4–6
Victory	20	IV	Singles	Finland	Micke Kontinen	6–0, 6–3, 6–1
▲4–1; 4–6 April 2014; Ilioupoli Tennis Club, Athens, Greece; Group II Europe/Africa Relegation Play-Off; Clay surface
Victory	21	I	Singles	Greece	Markos Kalovelonis	6–3, 6–3, 6–0
Victory	22	III	Doubles (with Dimitar Kutrovsky)	Greece	Alexandros Jakupovic / Markos Kalovelonis	7–6^{(7–4)}, 6–2, 6–4
▲5–0; 17–19 July 2015; Tennis Club Howald, Luxembourg City, Luxembourg; Group II Europe/Africa Quarterfinal; Clay surface
Victory	23	II	Singles	Luxembourg	Gilles Kremer	6–1, 6–2, 6–4
Victory	24	III	Doubles (with Dimitar Kutrovsky)	Luxembourg	Gilles Kremer / Mike Scheidweiler	6–3, 6–4, 6–4

=== United Cup (1 win, 1 loss) ===
Matches by type
Singles (1–1)
Doubles (0–0)

Result	No.	Rubber	Match type (partner if any)	Opponent nation	Opponent player(s)	Score
▼1–4; 29–30 December 2022; Perth Arena, Perth, Australia; Group stage; Hard surface
Defeat	1	II	Singles	Greece	Stefanos Tsitsipas	6–4, 2–6, 6–7^{(4–7)}
▲3–2; 31 December 2022 – 1 January 2023; Perth Arena, Perth, Australia; Group stage; Hard surface
Victory	2	II	Singles	Belgium	David Goffin	6–4, 7–5

=== Laver Cup (2 wins, 1 loss) ===
Matches by type Singles (2–0) Doubles (0–1)	Matches by points Day 1, 1 point (2–0) Day 2, 2 points (0–1)	Matches by venue Europe (1–0) Rest of world (1–1)

Venue	Score	Day	Match type	Opponent player(s)	W/L	Match score
2018
Chicago	13–8	1 (1 point)	Singles	(United States) Frances Tiafoe	Win	6–1, 6–4
Chicago	13–8	2 (2 points)	Doubles (w/ (Belgium) D Goffin)	(Australia) N Kyrgios / (United States) J Sock	Loss	3–6, 4–6
2024
Berlin	13–11	1 (1 point)	Singles	(Chile) Alejandro Tabilo	Win	7–6^{(7–4)}, 7–6^{(7–2)}

=== ATP Cup (3 wins, 3 losses) ===
Matches by type
Singles (2–1)
Doubles (1–2)

Result	No.	Rubber	Match type (partner if any)	Opponent nation	Opponent player(s)	Score
▲2–1; 3 January 2020; Ken Rosewall Arena, Sydney, Australia; Group stage; Hard surface
Victory	1	II	Singles	(United Kingdom) Great Britain	Dan Evans	2–6, 6–4, 6–1
Victory	2	III	Doubles (with Alexandar Lazarov)	(United Kingdom) Great Britain	Jamie Murray / Joe Salisbury	7–6^{(7–5)}, 6–7^{(2–7)}, [11–9]
▲2–1; 5 January 2020; Ken Rosewall Arena, Sydney, Australia; Group stage; Hard surface
Victory	3	II	Singles	Moldova	Radu Albot	6–2, 6–3
Defeat	4	III	Doubles (with Alexandar Lazarov)	Moldova	Radu Albot / Alexander Cozbinov	4–6, 6–7^{(4–7)}
▼1–2; 7 January 2020; Ken Rosewall Arena, Sydney, Australia; Group stage; Hard surface
Defeat	5	II	Singles	Belgium	David Goffin	6–4, 2–6, 2–6
Defeat	6	III	Doubles (with Alexandar Lazarov)	Belgium	Sander Gillé / Joran Vliegen	6–3, 4–6, [7–10]

=== Hopman Cup (5 wins, 1 loss) ===
Matches by type
Singles (2–1)
Doubles (3–0)

Result	No.	Rubber	Match type (partner if any)	Opponent nation	Opponent player(s)	Score
▼1–2; 2 January 2012; Crown Perth, Perth, Australia; Group stage; Hard (i) surface
Defeat	1	II	Singles	Czech Republic	Tomáš Berdych	4–6, 7–6^{(11–9)}, 3–6
Victory	2	III	Doubles (with Tsvetana Pironkova)	Czech Republic	Tomáš Berdych / Petra Kvitová	2–6, 6–3, [11–9]
▲2–1; 4 January 2012; Crown Perth, Perth, Australia; Group stage; Hard (i) surface
Victory	3	II	Singles	Denmark	Frederik Nielsen	7–6^{(7–5)}, 6–2
Victory	4	III	Doubles (with Tsvetana Pironkova)	Denmark	Frederik Nielsen / Caroline Wozniacki	3–6, 6–4, [10–1]
▲2–1; 6 January 2012; Crown Perth, Perth, Australia; Group stage; Hard (i) surface
Victory	5	II	Singles	United States	Mardy Fish	6–2, 6–1
Victory	6	III	Doubles (with Tsvetana Pironkova)	United States	Mardy Fish / Bethanie Mattek-Sands	8–5

== Exhibition matches ==
=== Singles ===
Result	Date	Tournament	Surface	Opponent	Score
Win	Jun 2018	Aspall Tennis Classic, London, United Kingdom	Grass	(Russia) Karen Khachanov	6–7^{(6–8)}, 6–4, [10–6]
Win	Sep 2024	Grigor Dimitrov Foundation, Sofia, Bulgaria	Hard (i)	(Serbia) Novak Djokovic	6–4, 2–6, [10–6]

== Junior Grand Slam finals ==
=== Singles: 2 (2 titles) ===
Result	Year	Tournament	Surface	Opponent	Score
Win	2008	Wimbledon	Grass	(Finland) Henri Kontinen	7–5, 6–3
Win	2008	US Open	Hard	(United States) Devin Britton	6–4, 6–3

=== Doubles: 1 (1 runner-up) ===
Result	Year	Tournament	Surface	Partner	Opponents	Score
Loss	2007	US Open	Hard	(Canada) Vasek Pospisil	(France) Jonathan Eysseric (France) Jérôme Inzerillo	2–6, 4–6

== Wins against Top 10 players ==
Dimitrov has a 43–94 (31.39%) win-loss record against players who were, at the time the match was played, ranked in the top 10.

=== Singles ===
Season	2012	2013	2014	2015	2016	2017	2018	2019	2020	2021	2022	2023	2024	2025	2026	Total
Wins	1	3	4	2	3	8	2	2	1	2	2	7	6	0	0	43

#	Player	Rk	Event	Surface	Rd	Score	Rk
2012
1.	(Czech Republic) Tomáš Berdych	7	Miami Open, United States	Hard	3R	6–3, 2–6, 6–4	101
2013
2.	(Serbia) Janko Tipsarević	10	Monte-Carlo Masters, France	Clay	2R	7–6^{(7–3)}, 6–1	34
3.	(Serbia) Novak Djokovic	1	Madrid Open, Spain	Clay	2R	7–6^{(8–6)}, 6–7^{(8–10)}, 6–3	28
4.	(Spain) David Ferrer	3	Stockholm Open, Sweden	Hard (i)	F	2–6, 6–3, 6–4	28
2014
5.	(United Kingdom) Andy Murray	7	Acapulco Open, Mexico	Hard	SF	4–6, 7–6^{(7–5)}, 7–6^{(7–3)}	22
6.	(Czech Republic) Tomáš Berdych	6	Italian Open, Italy	Clay	3R	6–7^{(3–7)}, 6–2, 6–2	14
7.	(Switzerland) Stan Wawrinka	3	Queen's Club, United Kingdom	Grass	SF	6–2, 6–4	13
8.	(United Kingdom) Andy Murray	5	Wimbledon, United Kingdom	Grass	QF	6–1, 7–6^{(7–4)}, 6–2	13
2015
9.	(Switzerland) Stan Wawrinka	9	Monte-Carlo Masters, France	Clay	3R	6–1, 6–2	11
10.	(Switzerland) Stan Wawrinka	9	Madrid Open, Spain	Clay	3R	7–6^{(7–5)}, 3–6, 6–3	11
2016
11.	(United Kingdom) Andy Murray	2	Miami Open, United States	Hard	3R	6–7^{(1–7)}, 6–4, 6–3	28
12.	(Switzerland) Stan Wawrinka	4	Cincinnati Open, United States	Hard	3R	6–4, 6–4	34
13.	(Spain) Rafael Nadal	4	China Open, China	Hard	QF	6–2, 6–4	20
2017
14.	(Austria) Dominic Thiem	8	Brisbane International, Australia	Hard	QF	6–3, 4–6, 6–3	17
15.	(Canada) Milos Raonic	3	Brisbane International, Australia	Hard	SF	7–6^{(9–7)}, 6–2	17
16.	(Japan) Kei Nishikori	5	Brisbane International, Australia	Hard	F	6–2, 2–6, 6–3	17
17.	(Austria) Dominic Thiem	4	ATP Finals, United Kingdom	Hard (i)	RR	6–4, 5–7, 7–5	6
18.	(Belgium) David Goffin	8	ATP Finals, United Kingdom	Hard (i)	RR	6–0, 6–2	6
19.	(Spain) Pablo Carreño Busta	10	ATP Finals, United Kingdom	Hard (i)	RR	6–1, 6–1	6
20.	(United States) Jack Sock	9	ATP Finals, United Kingdom	Hard (i)	SF	4–6, 6–0, 6–3	6
21.	(Belgium) David Goffin	8	ATP Finals, United Kingdom	Hard (i)	F	7–5, 4–6, 6–3	6
2018
22.	(Belgium) David Goffin	7	Rotterdam Open, Netherlands	Hard (i)	SF	6–3, 0–1 ret.	5
23.	(Belgium) David Goffin	10	Monte-Carlo Masters, France	Clay	QF	6–4, 7–6^{(7–5)}	5
2019
24.	(Switzerland) Roger Federer	3	US Open, United States	Hard	QF	3–6, 6–4, 3–6, 6–4, 6–2	78
25.	(Austria) Dominic Thiem	5	Paris Masters, France	Hard (i)	3R	6–3, 6–2	27
2020
26.	(Greece) Stefanos Tsitsipas	5	Vienna Open, Austria	Hard (i)	2R	6–7^{(5–7)}, 6–4, 6–3	20
2021
27.	(Austria) Dominic Thiem	3	Australian Open, Australia	Hard	4R	6–4, 6–4, 6–0	21
28.	(Russia) Daniil Medvedev	2	Indian Wells Open, United States	Hard	4R	4–6, 6–4, 6–3	28
2022
29.	(Norway) Casper Ruud	7	Monte-Carlo Masters, France	Clay	3R	6–3, 7–5	29
30.	Andrey Rublev	8	Vienna Open, Austria	Hard (i)	2R	6–3, 6–4	32
2023
31.	(Poland) Hubert Hurkacz	10	Rotterdam Open, Netherlands	Hard (i)	2R	7–6^{(7–4)}, 7–6^{(7–5)}	28
32.	(United States) Taylor Fritz	9	Geneva Open, Switzerland	Clay	SF	3–6, 7–5, 7–6^{(7–2)}	33
33.	(United States) Frances Tiafoe	10	Wimbledon, United Kingdom	Grass	3R	6–2, 6–3, 6–2	24
34.	(Denmark) Holger Rune	4	China Open, China	Hard	2R	6–3, 7–5	19
35.	(Spain) Carlos Alcaraz	2	Shanghai Masters, China	Hard	4R	5–7, 6–2, 6–4	19
36.	Daniil Medvedev	3	Paris Masters, France	Hard (i)	2R	6–3, 6–7^{(4–7)}, 7–6^{(7–2)}	17
37.	(Greece) Stefanos Tsitsipas	6	Paris Masters, France	Hard (i)	SF	6–3, 6–7^{(1–7)}, 7–6^{(7–3)}	17
2024
38.	(Denmark) Holger Rune	8	Brisbane International, Australia	Hard	F	7–6^{(7–5)}, 6–4	14
39.	(Poland) Hubert Hurkacz	9	Miami Open, United States	Hard	4R	3–6, 6–3, 7–6^{(7–3)}	12
40.	(Spain) Carlos Alcaraz	2	Miami Open, United States	Hard	QF	6–2, 6–4	12
41.	(Germany) Alexander Zverev	5	Miami Open, United States	Hard	SF	6–4, 6–7^{(4–7)}, 6–4	12
42.	(Poland) Hubert Hurkacz	9	French Open, France	Clay	4R	7–6^{(7–5)}, 6–4, 7–6^{(7–3)}	10
43.	Andrey Rublev	6	US Open, United States	Hard	4R	6–3, 7–6^{(7–3)}, 1–6, 3–6, 6–3	9

=== Doubles ===
Season	2011	2012	2013	2014	2015	2016	2017	2018	2019	2022	2023	Total
Wins	1	0	2	1	0	1	0	1	1	1	1	9

#	Partner	Players	Rk	Event	Surface	Rd	Score	Rk
2011
1.	(Italy) Andreas Seppi	(Pakistan) Aisam-ul-Haq Qureshi (India) Rohan Bopanna	8; 9	Eastbourne International, UK	Grass	QF	7–5, 6–3	572
2013
2.	(Cyprus) Marcos Baghdatis	(Belarus) Max Mirnyi (Romania) Horia Tecău	7; 8	Australian Open, Australia	Hard	2R	3–6, 6–3, 6–2	564
3.	(Denmark) Frederik Nielsen	(India) Leander Paes (France) Michaël Llodra	8; 32	Miami Open, United States	Hard	2R	7–6^{(8–6)}, 7–6^{(7–4)}	67
2014
4.	(Czech Republic) Lukáš Rosol	(Austria) Alexander Peya (Brazil) Bruno Soares	3; 3	Italian Open, Italy	Clay	2R	6–4, 3–6, [10–2]	142
2016
5.	(Pakistan) Aisam-ul-Haq Qureshi	(Brazil) Bruno Soares (United Kingdom) Jamie Murray	3; 4	Paris Masters, France	Hard (i)	2R	6–4, 3–6, [10–6]	422
2018
6.	(Belgium) David Goffin	(Croatia) Ivan Dodig (United States) Rajeev Ram	10; 27	Monte-Carlo Masters, Monaco	Clay	2R	5–7, 7–6^{(7–4)}, [10–8]	396
2019
7.	(Russia) Karen Khachanov	(Colombia) Juan Sebastián Cabal (Colombia) Robert Farah	10; 10	Madrid Open, Spain	Clay	1R	6–2, 7–5	–
2022
8.	Andrey Rublev	(Australia) John Peers (United Kingdom) Daniel Evans	9; 98	Cincinnati Open, USA	Hard	1R	7–6^{(7–5)}, 7–5	293
2023
9.	(Poland) Hubert Hurkacz	(United States) Rajeev Ram (United Kingdom) Joe Salisbury	3; 4	Indian Wells, USA	Hard	1R	7–6^{(7–2)}, 6–4	196

== Best Grand Slam results details ==
	Australian Open	
2017 Australian Open (15th Seed)
Round	Opponent	Score
1R	(Australia) Christopher O'Connell (WC)	7–6^{(7–2)}, 6–3, 6–3
2R	(South Korea) Chung Hyeon	1–6, 6–4, 6–4, 6–4
3R	(France) Richard Gasquet (18)	6–3, 6–2, 6–4
4R	(Uzbekistan) Denis Istomin (WC)	2–6, 7–6^{(7–2)}, 6–2, 6–1
QF	(Belgium) David Goffin (11)	6–3, 6–2, 6–4
SF	(Spain) Rafael Nadal (9)	3–6, 7–5, 6–7^{(5–7)}, 7–6^{(7–4)}, 4–6

	French Open	
2024 French Open (10th Seed)
Round	Opponent	Score
1R	(United States) Aleksandar Kovacevic	6–4, 6–3, 6–4
2R	(Hungary) Fábián Marozsán	6–0, 6–3, 6–4
3R	(Belgium) Zizou Bergs (Q)	6–3, 7–6^{(7–4)}, 4–6, 6–4
4R	(Poland) Hubert Hurkacz (7)	7–6^{(7–5)}, 6–4, 7–6^{(7–3)}
QF	(Italy) Jannik Sinner (1)	2–6, 4–6, 6–7^{(3–7)}

	Wimbledon Championships	
2014 Wimbledon (11th Seed)
Round	Opponent	Score
1R	(United States) Ryan Harrison (Q)	7–6^{(7–1)}, 6–3, 6–2
2R	(Australia) Luke Saville (Q)	6–3, 6–2, 6–4
3R	(Ukraine) Alexandr Dolgopolov (21)	6–7^{(3–7)}, 6–4, 2–6, 6–4, 6–1
4R	(Argentina) Leonardo Mayer	6–4, 7–6^{(8–6)}, 6–2
QF	(United Kingdom) Andy Murray (3)	6–1, 7–6^{(7–4)}, 6–2
SF	(Serbia) Novak Djokovic (1)	4–6, 6–3, 6–7^{(2–7)}, 6–7^{(7–9)}

	US Open	
2019 US Open (unseeded)
Round	Opponent	Score
1R	(Italy) Andreas Seppi	6–1, 6–7^{(2–7)}, 6–4, 6–3
2R	(Croatia) Borna Ćorić (12)	walkover
3R	(Poland) Kamil Majchrzak	7–5, 7–6^{(10–8)}, 6–2
4R	(Australia) Alex de Minaur	7–5, 6–3, 6–4
QF	(Switzerland) Roger Federer (3)	3–6, 6–4, 3–6, 6–4, 6–2
SF	(Russia) Daniil Medvedev (5)	6–7^{(5–7)}, 4–6, 3–6

== Grand Slam seedings ==
Not seeded at all, or not seeded inside the top 10 Seeded 10–4 Seeded no. 3 Seeded no. 2 Seeded no. 1

Year	Australian Open	French Open	Wimbledon	US Open
2009	did not play	did not play	not seeded	did not qualify
2010	did not qualify	did not play	did not play	did not play
2011	not seeded	not seeded	not seeded	not seeded
2012	not seeded	not seeded	not seeded	not seeded
2013	not seeded	26th	29th	25th
2014	22nd	11th	11th	7th
2015	10th	10th	11th	17th
2016	27th	not seeded	not seeded	22nd
2017	15th	11th	13th	7th
2018	3rd	4th	6th	8th
2019	20th	not seeded	not seeded	not seeded
2020	18th	18th	tournament cancelled*	14th
2021	18th	16th	18th	15th
2022	26th	18th	18th	17th
2023	27th	28th	21st	19th
2024	12th	10th	10th	9th
2025	10th	16th	19th	did not play
2026	not seeded			

* Due to the COVID-19 pandemic, the 2020 Wimbledon Championships of the tournament was cancelled.

== ATP Tour career earnings ==
Year	Majors	ATP wins	Total wins	Total finals	Earnings ($)	Money list rank
2007	0	0	0	0	$1,061	n/a
2008	0	0	0	0	$19,967	478
2009	0	0	0	0	$96,962	209
2010	0	0	0	0	$61,932	262
2011	0	0	0	0	$388,368	78
2012	0	0	0	0	$413,051	72
2013	0	1	1	2	$1,046,763	25
2014	0	3	3	4	$2,795,409	10
2015	0	0	0	0	$1,001,682	35
2016	0	0	0	3	$1,650,269	19
2017	0	4	4	5	$6,608,510	3
2018	0	0	0	1	$1,818,850	19
2019	0	0	0	0	$2,117,523	18
2020	0	0	0	0	$1,014,862	20
2021	0	0	0	0	$1,383,093	20
2022	0	0	0	0	$1,540,569	32
2023	0	0	0	2	$3,176,526	13
2024	0	1	1	2	$2,817,251	11
2025	0	0	0	0	$0	n/a
Career	0	9	9	19	$29,042,453	17

* Statistics correct as of 30 December 2024.
