= 2012 If Stockholm Open – Doubles =

Doubles
- 2012 If Stockholm Open

Final
- Champions: (Brazil) Marcelo Melo (Brazil) Bruno Soares
- Runners-up: (Sweden) Robert Lindstedt (Serbia) Nenad Zimonjić
- Score: 6–7^{(4–7)}, 7–5, [10–6]

Events
Singles	Doubles
← 2011 ·	If Stockholm Open	· 2013 →

Rohan Bopanna and Aisam-ul-Haq Qureshi were the defending champions but Bopanna decided not to participate.
Qureshi played alongside Jean-Julien Rojer.
Marcelo Melo and Bruno Soares won the final 6–7^{(4–7)}, 7–5, [10–6] against Robert Lindstedt and Nenad Zimonjić.

== Seeds ==
1. (Sweden) Robert Lindstedt / (Serbia) Nenad Zimonjić (final)
2. (Pakistan) Aisam-ul-Haq Qureshi / (Netherlands) Jean-Julien Rojer (semifinals)
3. (Brazil) Marcelo Melo / (Brazil) Bruno Soares (champions)
4. (Mexico) Santiago González / (United States) Scott Lipsky (first round)

== Draw ==
=== Key ===
- Q = Qualifier
- WC = Wild card
- LL = Lucky loser
- Alt = Alternate
- SE = Special exempt
- PR = Protected ranking
- ITF = ITF entry
- JE = Junior exempt
- w/o = Walkover
- r = Retired
- d = Defaulted
- SR = Special ranking

=== Draw ===
First round
1	(Sweden) R Lindstedt (Serbia) N Zimonjić	6	6
Alt	(Sweden) P Rosenholm (Sweden) M Sekulic	3	0
(Poland) T Bednarek (Japan) G Soeda	0	6^{2}
(United States) E Butorac (Australia) P Hanley	6	7
4	(Mexico) S González (United States) S Lipsky	5	4
(South Africa) K Anderson (Israel) J Erlich	7	6
(Sweden) J Brunström (South Africa) R Klaasen	3	2
WC	(United States) B Baker (Sweden) A Siljeström	6	6
(United Kingdom) C Fleming (United Kingdom) R Hutchins	6	6
(United Kingdom) J Delgado (United Kingdom) K Skupski	4	2
WC	(Sweden) F Bergevi (Sweden) F Simonsson	4	1
3	(Brazil) M Melo (Brazil) B Soares	6	6
(Germany) T Kamke (Germany) P Marx	3	2
(Cyprus) M Baghdatis (Finland) J Nieminen	6	6
(Colombia) A Falla (Spain) A Ramos	3	5
2	(Pakistan) A-u-H Qureshi (Netherlands) J-J Rojer	6	7

Quarterfinals
1	(Sweden) R Lindstedt (Serbia) N Zimonjić	6	3	[14]
(United States) E Butorac (Australia) P Hanley	3	6	[12]
(South Africa) K Anderson (Israel) J Erlich	6	6
WC	(United States) B Baker (Sweden) A Siljeström	2	3
(United Kingdom) C Fleming (United Kingdom) R Hutchins	5	3
3	(Brazil) M Melo (Brazil) B Soares	7	6
(Cyprus) M Baghdatis (Finland) J Nieminen
2	(Pakistan) A-u-H Qureshi (Netherlands) J-J Rojer	w/o

Semifinals
1	(Sweden) R Lindstedt (Serbia) N Zimonjić	4	7	[12]
(South Africa) K Anderson (Israel) J Erlich	6	6^{4}	[10]
3	(Brazil) M Melo (Brazil) B Soares	7	3	[10]
2	(Pakistan) A-u-H Qureshi (Netherlands) J-J Rojer	5	6	[4]

Final
1	(Sweden) Robert Lindstedt (Serbia) Nenad Zimonjić	7	5	[6]
3	(Brazil) Marcelo Melo (Brazil) Bruno Soares	6^{4}	7	[10]
