= 2012 If Stockholm Open – Singles =

Singles
- 2012 If Stockholm Open

Final
- Champion: (Czech Republic) Tomáš Berdych
- Runner-up: (France) Jo-Wilfried Tsonga
- Score: 4–6, 6–4, 6–4

Details
- Draw: 28
- Seeds: 8

Events
Singles	Doubles
- If Stockholm Open

Gaël Monfils was the defending champion, but lost to wildcard entrant Patrik Rosenholm in the first round.
Tomáš Berdych won the title, defeating Jo-Wilfried Tsonga 4–6, 6–4, 6–4 in the final.

== Seeds ==
The first four seeds received a bye into the second round.

1. (France) Jo-Wilfried Tsonga (final)
2. (Czech Republic) Tomáš Berdych (champion)
3. (Spain) Nicolás Almagro (semifinals)
4. (Germany) Florian Mayer (second round)
5. (Spain) Feliciano López (second round)
6. (Russia) Mikhail Youzhny (quarterfinals)
7. (Cyprus) Marcos Baghdatis (semifinals, retired because of a left groin injury)
8. (Finland) Jarkko Nieminen (second round)

== Draw ==
Key

- Q = Qualifier
- WC = Wild card
- LL = Lucky loser
- Alt = Alternate
- ITF = ITF entry
- PR = Protected ranking
- SR = Special ranking
- SE = Special exempt
- JE = Junior exempt
- JR = Junior Accelerator Programme entrant
- CO = College Accelerator Programme entrant
- NG = Next Gen Accelerator Program entrant
- w/o = Walkover
- r = Retired
- d = Defaulted

=== Finals ===
Semifinals
1	(France) Jo-Wilfried Tsonga	6	4	5
7	(Cyprus) Marcos Baghdatis	4	6	2^{r}
3/WC	(Spain) Nicolás Almagro	3	2
2	(Czech Republic) Tomáš Berdych	6	6

Final
1	(France) Jo-Wilfried Tsonga	6	4	4
2	(Czech Republic) Tomáš Berdych	4	6	6

=== Top half ===
First round
Q	(France) M Teixeira	3	6	3
(Japan) G Soeda	6	3	6
Q	(Belgium) Y Mertens	3	4
(Ukraine) S Stakhovsky	6	6
PR	(France) P-H Mathieu	6^{5}	7^{7}	2
5	(Spain) F López	7^{7}	6^{4}	6
(Spain) A Ramos	6	4	1
(Lithuania) R Berankis	4	6	6
(Czech Republic) J Hájek	3	6	6^{7}
(Colombia) A Falla	6	3	7^{9}
(Belgium) D Goffin	4	2
7	(Cyprus) M Baghdatis	6	6

Second round
1	(France) J-W Tsonga	6	7^{8}
(Japan) G Soeda	2	6^{6}
(Ukraine) S Stakhovsky	7^{7}	7
5	(Spain) F López	6^{5}	5
4	(Germany) F Mayer	6	4	2
(Lithuania) R Berankis	4	6	6
(Colombia) A Falla	0	0^{r}
7	(Cyprus) M Baghdatis	6	3

Quarterfinals
1	(France) J-W Tsonga	6	6
(Ukraine) S Stakhovsky	3	4
(Lithuania) R Berankis	3	6^{4}
7	(Cyprus) M Baghdatis	6	7^{7}

Semifinals
1	(France) J-W Tsonga	6	4	5
7	(Cyprus) M Baghdatis	4	6	2^{r}

=== Bottom half ===
First round
8	(Finland) J Nieminen	6	6
(Germany) T Kamke	3	4
(South Africa) K Anderson	4	6	4
WC	(Australia) L Hewitt	6	4	6
Q	(Argentina) F Delbonis	1	5
Q	(Romania) M Copil	6	7
6	(Russia) M Youzhny	6	6
(United States) B Baker	3	1
WC	(Sweden) P Rosenholm	6	1	6
(France) G Monfils	3	6	3
(Estonia) J Zopp	6	6
(Spain) P Andújar	4	4

Second round
8	(Finland) J Nieminen	6^{2}	6	4
WC	(Australia) L Hewitt	7^{7}	2	6
Q	(Romania) M Copil	4	6^{4}
3/WC	(Spain) N Almagro	6	7^{7}
6	(Russia) M Youzhny	6	6
WC	(Sweden) P Rosenholm	0	2
(Estonia) J Zopp	1	4
2	(Czech Republic) T Berdych	6	6

Quarterfinals
WC	(Australia) L Hewitt	1	4
3/WC	(Spain) N Almagro	6	6
6	(Russia) M Youzhny	3	6^{2}
2	(Czech Republic) T Berdych	6	7^{7}

Semifinals
3/WC	(Spain) N Almagro	3	2
2	(Czech Republic) T Berdych	6	6

== Qualifying ==
=== Seeds ===
1. (Argentina) Federico Delbonis (qualified)
2. (France) Jonathan Dasnières de Veigy (qualifying competition)
3. (Romania) Marius Copil (qualified)
4. (Belgium) Yannick Mertens (qualified)
5. (Germany) Peter Torebko (qualifying competition)
6. (Canada) Érik Chvojka (qualifying competition)
7. (France) Maxime Teixeira (qualified)
8. (Italy) Thomas Fabbiano (qualifying competition)

=== Qualifiers ===
1. (Argentina) Federico Delbonis
2. (France) Maxime Teixeira
3. (Romania) Marius Copil
4. (Belgium) Yannick Mertens

=== Draw ===
==== First qualifier ====
First round
(Republic of Ireland) James McGee	6	7
(Sweden) Igor Tubic	2	5
(Germany) Nils Langer	6	6
WC	(Sweden) Ante Tepic	2	0
(United States) William Boe-Wiegaard	5	4
5	(Germany) Peter Torebko	7	6

Second round
1	(Argentina) Federico Delbonis	6^{4}	6	6
(Republic of Ireland) James McGee	7^{7}	1	1
(Germany) Nils Langer	4	4
5	(Germany) Peter Torebko	6	6

Qualifying competition
1	(Argentina) Federico Delbonis	6	6^{2}	7^{7}
5	(Germany) Peter Torebko	1	7^{7}	6^{2}

==== Second qualifier ====
First round
(Sweden) Milos Sekulic	6	6
WC	(Sweden) Anton Waern	3	3
WC	(Sweden) Elliot Carnello	4	1
WC	(Sweden) Jonathan Mridha	6	6
(Switzerland) Henri Laaksonen	3	4
7	(France) Maxime Teixeira	6	6

Second round
2	(France) Jonathan Dasnières de Veigy	3	6	6
(Sweden) Milos Sekulic	6	2	0
WC	(Sweden) Jonathan Mridha	4	2
7	(France) Maxime Teixeira	6	6

Qualifying competition
2	(France) Jonathan Dasnières de Veigy	3	4
7	(France) Maxime Teixeira	6	6

==== Third qualifier ====
First round
3	(Romania) Marius Copil	6	6
(Sweden) Jacob Adaktusson	2	3
(Italy) Roberto Marcora	6	6
(France) Julien Maes	1	3
(Sweden) Isak Arvidsson	6	6
WC	(Sweden) Markus Schultz	2	3
(Italy) Claudio Grassi	4	3
6	(Canada) Érik Chvojka	6	6

Second round
3	(Romania) Marius Copil	6	6
(Italy) Roberto Marcora	3	2
(Sweden) Isak Arvidsson	6	2	3
6	(Canada) Érik Chvojka	4	6	6

Qualifying competition
3	(Romania) Marius Copil	4	6	6
6	(Canada) Érik Chvojka	6	1	4

==== Fourth qualifier ====
First round
4	(Belgium) Yannick Mertens	6	6
WC	(Sweden) Elias Ymer	3	3
(Sweden) Fred Simonsson	1	2
(Sweden) Robin Olin	6	6
(Sweden) Lucas Renard	7	6
(France) Fabrice Martin	5	4
WC	(Sweden) Christoffer Solberg	2	0
8	(Italy) Thomas Fabbiano	6	6

Second round
4	(Belgium) Yannick Mertens	6	6
(Sweden) Robin Olin	1	3
(Sweden) Lucas Renard	1	1
8	(Italy) Thomas Fabbiano	6	6

Qualifying competition
4	(Belgium) Yannick Mertens	7^{7}	6
8	(Italy) Thomas Fabbiano	6^{5}	3
