= 2010 Chang-Sat Bangkok 2 Open – Doubles =

Doubles
- 2010 Chang-Sat Bangkok 2 Open

Final
- Champions: (Thailand) Sanchai Ratiwatana (Thailand) Sonchat Ratiwatana
- Runners-up: (Denmark) Frederik Nielsen (Japan) Yuichi Sugita
- Score: 6–3, 7–5

Events
Singles	Doubles
Chang-Sat Bangkok 2 Open

The twins Sanchai and Sonchat Ratiwatana defeated Frederik Nielsen and Yuichi Sugita 6–3, 7–5 in the final.

== Seeds ==
1. (Thailand) Sanchai Ratiwatana / (Thailand) Sonchat Ratiwatana (champions)
2. (China) Gong Maoxin / (China) Li Zhe (quarterfinals)
3. (United Kingdom) Chris Eaton / (United Kingdom) Joshua Goodall (semifinals)
4. (Russia) Alexey Kudryuk / (Chinese Taipei) Lee Hsin-han (first round)

== Draw ==
=== Key ===
- Q = Qualifier
- WC = Wild card
- LL = Lucky loser
- Alt = Alternate
- SE = Special exempt
- PR = Protected ranking
- ITF = ITF entry
- JE = Junior exempt
- w/o = Walkover
- r = Retired
- d = Defaulted
- SR = Special ranking

=== Draw ===
First round
1	(Thailand) Sa Ratiwatana (Thailand) So Ratiwatana	6	6
WC	(Germany) S Rieschick (Thailand) D Udomchoke	0	4
(Japan) H Kondo (Japan) G Soeda	6^{6}	4
(Croatia) I Dodig (Australia) B Tomic	7	6
3	(United Kingdom) C Eaton (United Kingdom) J Goodall	6	6
(Thailand) W Doakmaiklee (Thailand) K Wachiramanowong	2	3
(Brazil) T Alves (India) Y Bhambri	7	6
ALT	Alternates	5	4
(Germany) D Gremelmayr (Australia) M Matosevic	3	6	[12]
(Australia) M Ebden (United Kingdom) J Ward	6	4	[10]
(Chinese Taipei) T-h Yang (Chinese Taipei) C-h Yi	7	6
4	(Russia) A Kudryuk (Chinese Taipei) H-h Lee	5	4
(Denmark) F Nielsen (Japan) Y Sugita	5	6	[10]
(United States) R DeHeart (New Zealand) D King-Turner	7	4	[5]
WC	(Germany) P Gojowczyk (Thailand) P Siriluethaiwattana	6	3	[1]
2	(China) M Gong (China) Z Li	4	6	[10]

Quarterfinals
1	(Thailand) Sa Ratiwatana (Thailand) So Ratiwatana	7	4	[10]
(Croatia) I Dodig (Australia) B Tomic	6^{4}	6	[7]
3	(United Kingdom) C Eaton (United Kingdom) J Goodall	7	6
(Brazil) T Alves (India) Y Bhambri	6^{4}	1
(Germany) D Gremelmayr (Australia) M Matosevic	6	6
(Chinese Taipei) T-h Yang (Chinese Taipei) C-h Yi	4	3
(Denmark) F Nielsen (Japan) Y Sugita	6	1	[10]
2	(China) M Gong (China) Z Li	2	6	[3]

Semifinals
1	(Thailand) Sa Ratiwatana (Thailand) So Ratiwatana	3	6	[10]
3	(United Kingdom) C Eaton (United Kingdom) J Goodall	6	3	[4]
(Germany) D Gremelmayr (Australia) M Matosevic	3	1
(Denmark) F Nielsen (Japan) Y Sugita	6	6

Final
1	(Thailand) Sa Ratiwatana (Thailand) So Ratiwatana	6	7
(Denmark) F Nielsen (Japan) Y Sugita	3	5
