= 2013 If Stockholm Open – Singles =

Singles
- 2013 If Stockholm Open

Final
- Champion: (Bulgaria) Grigor Dimitrov
- Runner-up: (Spain) David Ferrer
- Score: 2–6, 6–3, 6–4

Details
- Draw: 28
- Seeds: 8

Events
Singles	Doubles
- If Stockholm Open

Grigor Dimitrov defeated David Ferrer in the final, 2–6, 6–3, 6–4 to win the singles tennis title at the 2013 If Stockholm Open. It was his maiden ATP Tour title. Dimitrov became the first ever Bulgarian player to win an ATP Tour title.

Tomáš Berdych was the defending champion, but chose not to compete.

== Seeds ==
The first four seeds received a bye into the second round.

1. (Spain) David Ferrer (final)
2. (Canada) Milos Raonic (quarterfinals)
3. (Poland) Jerzy Janowicz (quarterfinals)
4. (South Africa) Kevin Anderson (second round)
5. (Latvia) Ernests Gulbis (semifinals)
6. (France) Benoît Paire (semifinals)
7. (Bulgaria) Grigor Dimitrov (champion)
8. (Croatia) Ivan Dodig (first round)

== Draw ==
Key

- Q = Qualifier
- WC = Wild card
- LL = Lucky loser
- Alt = Alternate
- ITF = ITF entry
- PR = Protected ranking
- SR = Special ranking
- SE = Special exempt
- JE = Junior exempt
- JR = Junior Accelerator Programme entrant
- CO = College Accelerator Programme entrant
- NG = Next Gen Accelerator Program entrant
- w/o = Walkover
- r = Retired
- d = Defaulted

=== Finals ===
Semifinals
1	(Spain) David Ferrer	3	6	6
5	(Latvia) Ernests Gulbis	6	4	1
7	(Bulgaria) Grigor Dimitrov	4	6	6
6/WC	(France) Benoît Paire	6	2	2

Final
1	(Spain) David Ferrer	6	3	4
7	(Bulgaria) Grigor Dimitrov	2	6	6

=== Top half ===
First round
(United States) J Sock	6	6
(Australia) B Tomic	4	2
(Finland) J Nieminen	6	3	7^{7}
(Germany) B Becker	3	6	6^{3}
(Spain) F Verdasco	6^{2}	6	6
8	(Croatia) I Dodig	7^{7}	1	4
Q	(Germany) N Langer	6^{5}	3
(Spain) G García-López	7^{7}	6
(Germany) T Kamke	4	2
(Netherlands) I Sijsling	6	6
(France) J Chardy	3	6	6^{3}
5	(Latvia) E Gulbis	6	3	7^{7}

Second round
1	(Spain) D Ferrer	4	6	6
(United States) J Sock	6	3	1
(Finland) J Nieminen	2	6	3
(Spain) F Verdasco	6	3	6
3	(Poland) J Janowicz	6	6
(Spain) G García-López	2	1
(Netherlands) I Sijsling	3	6^{3}
5	(Latvia) E Gulbis	6	7^{7}

Quarterfinals
1	(Spain) D Ferrer	w/o
(Spain) F Verdasco
3	(Poland) J Janowicz	5	6	3
5	(Latvia) E Gulbis	7	4	6

Semifinals
1	(Spain) D Ferrer	3	6	6
5	(Latvia) E Gulbis	6	4	1

=== Bottom half ===
First round
7	(Bulgaria) G Dimitrov	6	6
Q	(Romania) M Copil	3	4
(Germany) J-L Struff	6	6
Q	(Sweden) M Sekulic	3	0
(France) K de Schepper	6	5	7
WC	(Sweden) M Eriksson	4	7	5
6/WC	(France) B Paire	6	6
(Colombia) S Giraldo	4	4
PR	(Estonia) J Zopp	5^{r}
(Spain) P Carreño Busta	5
Q	(Sweden) J Johansson	6	6
(Colombia) A Falla	1	3

Second round
7	(Bulgaria) G Dimitrov	6	6
(Germany) J-L Struff	1	3
(France) K de Schepper	7^{7}	4	6
4	(South Africa) K Anderson	6^{5}	6	3
6/WC	(France) B Paire	6	6
(Spain) P Carreño Busta	4	4
Q	(Sweden) J Johansson	2	6^{3}
2/WC	(Canada) M Raonic	6	7^{7}

Quarterfinals
7	(Bulgaria) G Dimitrov	6	6
(France) K de Schepper	4	2
6/WC	(France) B Paire	7^{7}	6
2/WC	(Canada) M Raonic	6^{3}	3

Semifinals
7	(Bulgaria) G Dimitrov	4	6	6
6/WC	(France) B Paire	6	2	2

== Qualifying ==
=== Seeds ===
1. (Germany) Julian Reister (qualifying competition, retired)
2. (France) Paul-Henri Mathieu (second round, retired)
3. (Romania) Marius Copil (qualified)
4. (Germany) Matthias Bachinger (second round)
5. (Italy) Thomas Fabbiano (first round)
6. (Bosnia and Herzegovina) Damir Džumhur (qualifying competition)
7. (Belgium) Niels Desein (first round)
8. (France) Albano Olivetti (first round, retired)

=== Qualifiers ===
1. (Sweden) Milos Sekulic
2. (Germany) Nils Langer
3. (Romania) Marius Copil
4. (Sweden) Joachim Johansson

=== Qualifying draw ===
==== First qualifier ====
First round
1	(Germany) Julian Reister	7	6^{5}	6
(Switzerland) Michael Lammer	5	7^{7}	3
(France) Constant Lestienne	7^{7}	4	6
(Sweden) Lucas Renard	6^{2}	6	4
WC	(Sweden) Tobias Blomgren	5	4
(Sweden) Milos Sekulic	7	6
WC	(Sweden) Fred Simonsson	6^{2}	4
8	(France) Albano Olivetti	7^{7}	1^{r}

Second round
1	(Germany) Julian Reister	6	3	7^{7}
(France) Constant Lestienne	2	6	6^{4}
(Sweden) Milos Sekulic	6	6
WC	(Sweden) Fred Simonsson	1	2

Qualifying competition
1	(Germany) Julian Reister	3	2^{r}
(Sweden) Milos Sekulic	6	2

==== Second qualifier ====
First round
2	(France) Paul-Henri Mathieu	6	6
(Belgium) Yannick Mertens	0	1
(Germany) Dennis Blömke	4	2
(Sweden) Patrik Rosenholm	6	6
(Chile) Hans Podlipnik-Castillo	4	1
(Germany) Nils Langer	6	6
(United Kingdom) Alexander Ward	7^{7}	6
5	(Italy) Thomas Fabbiano	6^{3}	3

Second round
2	(France) Paul-Henri Mathieu	3	0^{r}
(Sweden) Patrik Rosenholm	6	2
(Germany) Nils Langer	6	7^{7}
(United Kingdom) Alexander Ward	1	6^{4}

Qualifying competition
(Sweden) Patrik Rosenholm	3	6	2
(Germany) Nils Langer	6	4	6

==== Third qualifier ====
First round
3	(Romania) Marius Copil	6	6
(Switzerland) Adrien Bossel	3	2
(Poland) Adam Chadaj	0	3
(Sweden) Elias Ymer	6	6
WC	(Sweden) Jacob Adaktusson	2	0
(Republic of Ireland) Louk Sorensen	6	6
(United Kingdom) Daniel Cox	1	6	7^{7}
7	(Belgium) Niels Desein	6	2	6^{4}

Second round
3	(Romania) Marius Copil	6	6
(Sweden) Elias Ymer	4	2
(Republic of Ireland) Louk Sorensen	6	3	1^{r}
(United Kingdom) Daniel Cox	2	6	2

Qualifying competition
3	(Romania) Marius Copil	6	6
(United Kingdom) Daniel Cox	3	4

==== Fourth qualifier ====
First round
4	(Germany) Matthias Bachinger	5	6	6
(Colombia) Juan Sebastián Cabal	7	0	0
(Canada) Érik Chvojka	3	5
WC	(Sweden) Joachim Johansson	6	7
(Finland) Herkko Pöllänen	4	1
(Sweden) Isak Arvidsson	6	6
(Zimbabwe) Takanyi Garanganga	6	6^{2}	2
6	(Bosnia and Herzegovina) Damir Džumhur	3	7^{7}	6

Second round
4	(Germany) Matthias Bachinger	3	6^{2}
WC	(Sweden) Joachim Johansson	6	7^{7}
(Sweden) Isak Arvidsson	6^{5}	4
6	(Bosnia and Herzegovina) Damir Džumhur	7^{7}	6

Qualifying competition
WC	(Sweden) Joachim Johansson	6	6
6	(Bosnia and Herzegovina) Damir Džumhur	2	1
