= 2014 Stockholm Open – Singles =

Singles
- 2014 Stockholm Open

Final
- Champion: (Czech Republic) Tomáš Berdych
- Runner-up: (Bulgaria) Grigor Dimitrov
- Score: 5–7, 6–4, 6–4

Details
- Draw: 28
- Seeds: 8

Events
| Singles | Doubles |
- Stockholm Open

Grigor Dimitrov was the defending champion, but lost to Tomáš Berdych in the final, 5–7, 6–4, 6–4.

== Seeds ==
The top four seeds received a bye into the second round.

1. (Czech Republic) Tomáš Berdych (champion)
2. (Bulgaria) Grigor Dimitrov (final)
3. (South Africa) Kevin Anderson (second round)
4. (Ukraine) Alexandr Dolgopolov (second round)
5. (Argentina) Leonardo Mayer (second round)
6. (France) Jérémy Chardy (second round)
7. (Spain) Fernando Verdasco (quarterfinals)
8. (Portugal) João Sousa (first round)

== Draw ==
Key

- Q = Qualifier
- WC = Wild card
- LL = Lucky loser
- Alt = Alternate
- ITF = ITF entry
- PR = Protected ranking
- SR = Special ranking
- SE = Special exempt
- JE = Junior exempt
- JR = Junior Accelerator Programme entrant
- CO = College Accelerator Programme entrant
- NG = Next Gen Accelerator Program entrant
- w/o = Walkover
- r = Retired
- d = Defaulted

=== Finals ===
Semifinals
1 | (Czech Republic) Tomáš Berdych | 7^{9} | 6
Q | (Germany) Matthias Bachinger | 6^{7} | 4
(Australia) Bernard Tomic | 3 | 5
2 | (Bulgaria) Grigor Dimitrov | 6 | 7

Final
1 | (Czech Republic) Tomáš Berdych | 5 | 6 | 6
2 | (Bulgaria) Grigor Dimitrov | 7 | 4 | 4

=== Top half ===
First round
Q | (Germany) D Brown | 6 | 7^{7}
WC | (Sweden) C Lindell | 4 | 6^{3}
(Spain) P Carreño Busta | 6^{3} | 4
Q | (France) P-H Herbert | 7^{7} | 6
Q | (Romania) M Copil | 7^{7} | 4 | 6
8 | (Portugal) J Sousa | 6^{4} | 6 | 4
(Cyprus) M Baghdatis | 6 | 2 | 4
(France) A Mannarino | 2 | 6 | 6
(Netherlands) I Sijsling | 6 | 6^{3} | 4
Q | (Germany) M Bachinger | 2 | 7^{7} | 6
(United States) D Young | 4 | 4
5 | (Argentina) L Mayer | 6 | 6

Second round
1 | (Czech Republic) T Berdych | 7 | 6
Q | (Germany) D Brown | 5 | 3
Q | (France) P-H Herbert | 4 | 3
Q | (Romania) M Copil | 6 | 6
4 | (Ukraine) A Dolgopolov | 4 | 7^{7} | 6^{4}
(France) A Mannarino | 6 | 6^{2} | 7^{7}
Q | (Germany) M Bachinger | 7^{7} | 6^{4} | 6
5 | (Argentina) L Mayer | 6^{3} | 7^{7} | 3

Quarterfinals
1 | (Czech Republic) T Berdych | 6 | 6
Q | (Romania) M Copil | 2 | 2
(France) A Mannarino | 6 | 1 | 4
Q | (Germany) M Bachinger | 4 | 6 | 6

Semifinals
1 | (Czech Republic) T Berdych | 7^{9} | 6
Q | (Germany) M Bachinger | 6^{7} | 4

=== Bottom half ===
First round
7 | (Spain) F Verdasco | 6 | 3 | 6
(Australia) M Matosevic | 3 | 6 | 3
(Spain) A Ramos-Viñolas | 4 | 4
(Finland) J Nieminen | 6 | 6
WC | (Sweden) P Rosenholm | 6^{1} | 7 | 4
(Australia) B Tomic | 7^{7} | 5 | 6
6 | (France) J Chardy | 6 | 6
WC | (Sweden) E Ymer | 3 | 4
(United States) J Sock | 6 | 4 | 6
(Kazakhstan) A Golubev | 1 | 6 | 0
(Russia) T Gabashvili | 6 | 6
(Colombia) A Falla | 2 | 4

Second round
7 | (Spain) F Verdasco | 6 | 6
(Finland) J Nieminen | 3 | 4
(Australia) B Tomic | 7^{7} | 6
3 | (South Africa) K Anderson | 6^{4} | 4
6 | (France) J Chardy | 6^{3} | 3
(United States) J Sock | 7^{7} | 6
(Russia) T Gabashvili | 5 | 6^{4}
2 | (Bulgaria) G Dimitrov | 7 | 7^{7}

Quarterfinals
7 | (Spain) F Verdasco | 6 | 4 | 6^{6}
(Australia) B Tomic | 0 | 6 | 7^{8}
(United States) J Sock | 7 | 4 | 3
2 | (Bulgaria) G Dimitrov | 5 | 6 | 6

Semifinals
(Australia) B Tomic | 3 | 5
2 | (Bulgaria) G Dimitrov | 6 | 7

== Qualifying ==
=== Seeds ===
1. (Germany) Dustin Brown (qualified)
2. (France) Pierre-Hugues Herbert (qualified)
3. (Australia) James Duckworth (first round)
4. (France) Vincent Millot (first round)
5. (United States) Austin Krajicek (second round)
6. (Romania) Marius Copil (qualified)
7. (Italy) Andrea Arnaboldi (qualifying competition)
8. (Switzerland) Yann Marti (first round)

=== Qualifiers ===
1. (Germany) Dustin Brown
2. (France) Pierre-Hugues Herbert
3. (Romania) Marius Copil
4. (Germany) Matthias Bachinger

=== Qualifying draw ===
==== First qualifier ====
First round
1 | (Germany) Dustin Brown | 7^{7} | 3 | 6
(United Kingdom) Edward Corrie | 6^{5} | 6 | 2
(Zimbabwe) Takanyi Garanganga | 6 | 6
WC | (Sweden) Tobias Blomgren | 3 | 1
(Estonia) Vladimir Ivanov | 5 | 7^{7} | 6
(Switzerland) Adrien Bossel | 7 | 6^{5} | 1
(France) Florent Serra | 1 | 4
7 | (Italy) Andrea Arnaboldi | 6 | 6

Second round
1 | (Germany) Dustin Brown | 6 | 6
(Zimbabwe) Takanyi Garanganga | 2 | 1
(Estonia) Vladimir Ivanov | 6^{2} | 6 | 2
7 | (Italy) Andrea Arnaboldi | 7^{7} | 0 | 6

Qualifying competition
1 | (Germany) Dustin Brown | 6 | 7
7 | (Italy) Andrea Arnaboldi | 3 | 5

==== Second qualifier ====
First round
2 | (France) Pierre-Hugues Herbert | 6 | 6
(Greece) Theodoros Angelinos | 3 | 3
WC | (Sweden) Mikael Ymer | 1 | 6 | 7
WC | (Sweden) Milos Sekulic | 6 | 3 | 5
(Sweden) Jacob Adaktusson | 6 | 6^{7} | 6
WC | (Sweden) Jonathan Mridha | 1 | 7^{9} | 2
(Estonia) Jürgen Zopp | 7^{7} | 5 | 7^{7}
8 | (Switzerland) Yann Marti | 6^{5} | 7 | 6^{5}

Second round
2 | (France) Pierre-Hugues Herbert | 6 | 6
WC | (Sweden) Mikael Ymer | 3 | 2
(Sweden) Jacob Adaktusson | 0 | 6^{5}
(Estonia) Jürgen Zopp | 6 | 7^{7}

Qualifying competition
2 | (France) Pierre-Hugues Herbert | 6 | 6
(Estonia) Jürgen Zopp | 1 | 4

==== Third qualifier ====
First round
3 | (Australia) James Duckworth | 6^{4} | 6^{10}
(Poland) Marcin Gawron | 7^{7} | 7^{12}
(United Kingdom) Joshua Milton | 3 | 6 | 6
(Sweden) Markus Eriksson | 6 | 2 | 4
(France) Maxime Teixeira | 6 | 3 | 2
(Germany) Peter Torebko | 4 | 6 | 6
(Switzerland) Henri Laaksonen | 6^{4} | 4
6 | (Romania) Marius Copil | 7^{7} | 6

Second round
(Poland) Marcin Gawron | 3 | 6 | 6
(United Kingdom) Joshua Milton | 6 | 1 | 4
(Germany) Peter Torebko | 3 | 4
6 | (Romania) Marius Copil | 6 | 6

Qualifying competition
(Poland) Marcin Gawron | 0 | 4
6 | (Romania) Marius Copil | 6 | 6

==== Fourth qualifier ====
First round
4 | (France) Vincent Millot | 2 | 2
(Sweden) Isak Arvidsson | 6 | 6
(Finland) Micke Kontinen | 4 | 1
(Germany) Matthias Bachinger | 6 | 6
(Germany) Tim Pütz | 6 | 6
(Poland) Andriej Kapaś | 3 | 2
(Belgium) Niels Desein | 2 | 2
5 | (United States) Austin Krajicek | 6 | 6

Second round
(Sweden) Isak Arvidsson | 4 | 2
(Germany) Matthias Bachinger | 6 | 6
(Germany) Tim Pütz | 6^{5} | 6 | 6
5 | (United States) Austin Krajicek | 7^{7} | 4 | 1

Qualifying competition
(Germany) Matthias Bachinger | 7^{7} | 6
(Germany) Tim Pütz | 6^{4} | 2
