= 2014 Stockholm Open =

- Date: 13–19 October
- Edition: 46th
- Category: ATP World Tour 250 series
- Draw: 28S / 16D
- Prize money: €521,405
- Surface: Hard / Indoor
- Location: Stockholm, Sweden
- Venue: Kungliga tennishallen

Champions

Singles
- (Czech Republic) Tomáš Berdych

Doubles
- (United States) Eric Butorac / (South Africa) Raven Klaasen
| ← 2013 · | Stockholm Open | · 2015 → |

The 2014 Stockholm Open was a professional men's tennis tournament played on indoor hard courts. It was the 46th edition of the tournament, and part of the ATP World Tour 250 series of the 2014 ATP World Tour. It took place at the Kungliga tennishallen in Stockholm, Sweden between 13 and 19 October 2014.

== Singles main-draw entrants ==
=== Seeds ===
| Country | Player | Rank^{1} | Seed |
|---|---|---|---|
| CZE | Tomáš Berdych | 7 | 1 |
| BUL | Grigor Dimitrov | 10 | 2 |
| RSA | Kevin Anderson | 16 | 3 |
| UKR | Alexandr Dolgopolov | 24 | 4 |
| ARG | Leonardo Mayer | 25 | 5 |
| FRA | Jérémy Chardy | 32 | 6 |
| ESP | Fernando Verdasco | 34 | 7 |
| POR | João Sousa | 49 | 8 |

- ^{1} Rankings are as of October 6, 2014

=== Other entrants ===
The following players received wildcards into the singles main draw:

- (Sweden) Christian Lindell
- (Sweden) Patrik Rosenholm
- (Sweden) Elias Ymer

The following players received entry from the qualifying draw:

- (Germany) Matthias Bachinger
- (Germany) Dustin Brown
- (Romania) Marius Copil
- (France) Pierre-Hugues Herbert

=== Withdrawals ===
Before the tournament

- (Australia) Nick Kyrgios
- (Chinese Taipei) Lu Yen-hsun
- (France) Gaël Monfils
- (France) Édouard Roger-Vasselin

== Doubles main-draw entrants ==
=== Seeds ===
| Country | Player | Country | Player | Rank^{1} | Seed |
|---|---|---|---|---|---|
| NED | Jean-Julien Rojer | ROU | Horia Tecău | 37 | 1 |
| POL | Łukasz Kubot | SWE | Robert Lindstedt | 41 | 2 |
| USA | Eric Butorac | RSA | Raven Klaasen | 42 | 3 |
| COL | Juan Sebastián Cabal | COL | Robert Farah | 49 | 4 |

- Rankings are as of October 6, 2014

=== Other entrants ===
The following pairs received wildcards into the doubles main draw:

- (Germany) Dustin Brown / (Sweden) Andreas Siljeström
- (Sweden) Johan Brunström / (United States) Nicholas Monroe

== Finals ==
=== Singles ===
- (Czech Republic) Tomáš Berdych defeated (Bulgaria) Grigor Dimitrov, 5–7, 6–4, 6–4

=== Doubles ===
- (United States) Eric Butorac / (South Africa) Raven Klaasen defeated (Philippines) Treat Huey / (United States) Jack Sock, 6–4, 6–3
