= 2014 Stockholm Open – Doubles =

Doubles
- 2014 Stockholm Open

Final
- Champions: (United States) Eric Butorac (South Africa) Raven Klaasen
- Runners-up: (Philippines) Treat Huey (United States) Jack Sock
- Score: 6-4, 6-3

Events
Singles	Doubles
← 2013 ·	Stockholm Open	· 2015 →

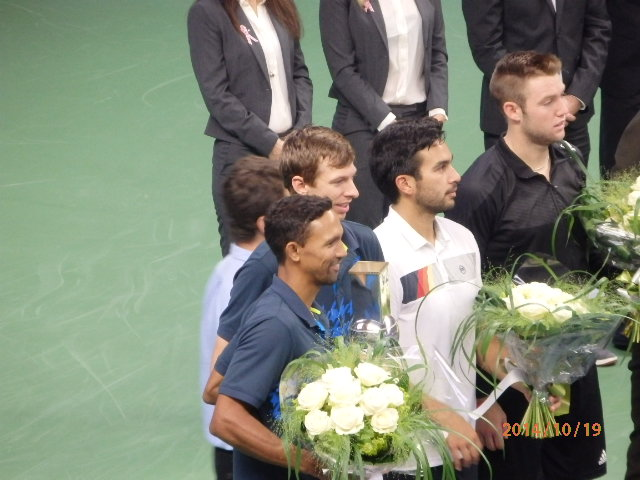
Award ceremony

Aisam-ul-Haq Qureshi and Jean-Julien Rojer were the defending champions, but Qureshi chose not to participate this year. Rojer played alongside Horia Tecău, but lost in the first round to Grigor Dimitrov and Pierre-Hugues Herbert.
Eric Butorac and Raven Klaasen won the title, defeating Treat Huey and Jack Sock in the final, 6-4, 6-3.

== Seeds ==
1. (Netherlands) Jean-Julien Rojer / (Romania) Horia Tecău (first round)
2. (Poland) Łukasz Kubot / (Sweden) Robert Lindstedt (quarterfinals)
3. (United States) Eric Butorac / (South Africa) Raven Klaasen (champions)
4. (Colombia) Juan Sebastián Cabal / (Colombia) Robert Farah (first round)

== Draw ==
=== Key ===
- Q = Qualifier
- WC = Wild card
- LL = Lucky loser
- Alt = Alternate
- ITF = ITF entry
- PR = Protected ranking
- SR = Special ranking
- SE = Special exempt
- JE = Junior exempt
- JR = Junior Accelerator Programme entrant
- CO = College Accelerator Programme entrant
- NG = Next Gen Accelerator Program entrant
- w/o = Walkover
- r = Retired
- d = Defaulted

=== Draw ===
First round
1	(Netherlands) J-J Rojer (Romania) H Tecău	5	6	[10]
(Bulgaria) G Dimitrov (France) P-H Herbert	7	4	[12]
(Philippines) T Huey (United States) J Sock	6	6
(Spain) P Carreño Busta (Portugal) J Sousa	3	4
4	(Colombia) JS Cabal (Colombia) R Farah	3	4
(United States) A Krajicek (United States) D Young	6	6
(Kazakhstan) A Golubev (New Zealand) A Sitak	4	7^{7}	[4]
WC	(Germany) D Brown (Sweden) A Siljeström	6	6^{5}	[10]
(Finland) H Kontinen (Finland) J Nieminen	6	3	[10]
(Russia) T Gabashvili (Argentina) L Mayer	1	6	[7]
(France) J Chardy (Czech Republic) L Dlouhý	5	4
3	(United States) E Butorac (South Africa) R Klaasen	7	6
WC	(Sweden) J Brunström (United States) N Monroe	2	3
(United Kingdom) J Murray (Australia) J Peers	6	6
(South Africa) K Anderson (Israel) J Erlich	4	6^{5}
2	(Poland) Ł Kubot (Sweden) R Lindstedt	6	7^{7}

Quarterfinals
(Bulgaria) G Dimitrov (France) P-H Herbert	6	1	[6]
(Philippines) T Huey (United States) J Sock	1	6	[10]
(United States) A Krajicek (United States) D Young	6	5	[6]
WC	(Germany) D Brown (Sweden) A Siljeström	3	7	[10]
(Finland) H Kontinen (Finland) J Nieminen	5	6^{6}
3	(United States) E Butorac (South Africa) R Klaasen	7	7^{8}
(United Kingdom) J Murray (Australia) J Peers	6	6^{5}	[10]
2	(Poland) Ł Kubot (Sweden) R Lindstedt	1	7^{7}	[7]

Semifinals
(Philippines) T Huey (United States) J Sock	6	6
WC	(Germany) D Brown (Sweden) A Siljeström	1	4
3	(United States) E Butorac (South Africa) R Klaasen	6^{7}	6	[10]
(United Kingdom) J Murray (Australia) J Peers	7^{9}	3	[6]

Final
(Philippines) T Huey (United States) J Sock	4	3
3	(United States) E Butorac (South Africa) R Klaasen	6	6
