= 2013 Brisbane International – Men's doubles =

Coordinates: 27°31′30″S 153°0′26″E

Men's doubles
- 2013 Brisbane International

Final
- Champions: (Brazil) Marcelo Melo (Spain) Tommy Robredo
- Runners-up: (United States) Eric Butorac (Australia) Paul Hanley
- Score: 4–6, 6–1, [10–5]

Events
Singles	men	women
Doubles	men	women
- Brisbane International

Max Mirnyi and Daniel Nestor were the defending champions, but decided not to participate.
Unseeded pair Marcelo Melo and Tommy Robredo won the title, defeating Eric Butorac and Paul Hanley in the final, 4–6, 6–1, [10–5].

== Seeds ==
1. (United States) Eric Butorac / (Australia) Paul Hanley (final)
2. (United Kingdom) Colin Fleming / (United Kingdom) Jamie Murray (quarterfinals)
3. (Colombia) Juan Sebastián Cabal / (Colombia) Robert Farah (first round)
4. (Russia) Mikhail Elgin / (Uzbekistan) Denis Istomin (first round)

== Draw ==
Key

- Q = Qualifier
- WC = Wild card
- LL = Lucky loser
- Alt = Alternate
- ITF = ITF entry
- PR = Protected ranking
- SR = Special ranking
- SE = Special exempt
- JE = Junior exempt
- JR = Junior Accelerator Programme entrant
- CO = College Accelerator Programme entrant
- NG = Next Gen Accelerator Program entrant
- w/o = Walkover
- r = Retired
- d = Defaulted

=== Draw ===
First round
1	(United States) E Butorac (Australia) P Hanley	6	7^{7}
WC	(Australia) C Guccione (Australia) L Hewitt	4	6^{0}
(Slovakia) M Kližan (United States) S Lipsky	4	4
(Austria) J Melzer (Canada) M Raonic	6	6
3	(Colombia) JS Cabal (Colombia) R Farah	3	3
(Cyprus) M Baghdatis (Finland) J Nieminen	6	6
(Germany) F Mayer (Germany) F Moser	3	6^{5}
(Colombia) A Falla (Colombia) S Giraldo	6	7^{7}
(United States) B Baker (United States) R Harrison	4	4
Alt	(Australia) J Peers (Australia) J Smith	6	6
(Bulgaria) G Dimitrov (Japan) K Nishikori	7^{7}	4	[10]
4	(Russia) M Elgin (Uzbekistan) D Istomin	6^{5}	6	[7]
(Brazil) M Melo (Spain) T Robredo	6	6
WC	(Australia) M Ebden (Australia) M Matosevic	4	3
(Belgium) D Goffin (Luxembourg) G Müller	6^{5}	4
2	(United Kingdom) C Fleming (United Kingdom) J Murray	7^{7}	6

Quarterfinals
1	(United States) E Butorac (Australia) P Hanley	6	3	[10]
(Austria) J Melzer (Canada) M Raonic	4	6	[4]
(Cyprus) M Baghdatis (Finland) J Nieminen	6	6
(Colombia) A Falla (Colombia) S Giraldo	4	4
Alt	(Australia) J Peers (Australia) J Smith	6^{6}	5
(Bulgaria) G Dimitrov (Japan) K Nishikori	7^{8}	7
(Brazil) M Melo (Spain) T Robredo	7^{7}	6
2	(United Kingdom) C Fleming (United Kingdom) J Murray	6^{2}	4

Semifinals
1	(United States) E Butorac (Australia) P Hanley	6	6
(Cyprus) M Baghdatis (Finland) J Nieminen	2	3
(Bulgaria) G Dimitrov (Japan) K Nishikori
(Brazil) M Melo (Spain) T Robredo	w/o

Final
1	(United States) E Butorac (Australia) P Hanley	6	1	[5]
(Brazil) M Melo (Spain) T Robredo	4	6	[10]
