= 2013 Brisbane International – Women's doubles =

Coordinates: 27°31′30″S 153°0′26″E

Women's doubles
- 2013 Brisbane International

Final
- Champions: (United States) Bethanie Mattek-Sands (India) Sania Mirza
- Runners-up: (Germany) Anna-Lena Grönefeld (Czech Republic) Květa Peschke
- Score: 4–6, 6–4, [10–7]

Details
- Draw: 16
- Seeds: 4

Events
Singles	men	women
Doubles	men	women
- Brisbane International

Nuria Llagostera Vives and Arantxa Parra Santonja were the defending champions but they decided not to participate together.
Llagostera Vives partnered Dominika Cibulková and Parra Santonja partnered up with Alicja Rosolska. Both of them were beaten in the first round.
The unseeded team of Bethanie Mattek-Sands and Sania Mirza won the title against Anna-Lena Grönefeld and Květa Peschke after defeating them 4–6, 6–4, [10–7] in the final.

== Seeds ==
1. (Italy) Sara Errani / (Italy) Roberta Vinci (semifinals)
2. (United States) Liezel Huber / (Spain) María José Martínez Sánchez (quarterfinals)
3. (United States) Raquel Kops-Jones / (United States) Abigail Spears (first round)
4. (Germany) Anna-Lena Grönefeld / (Czech Republic) Květa Peschke (final)

== Draw ==
Key

- Q = Qualifier
- WC = Wild card
- LL = Lucky loser
- Alt = Alternate
- ITF = ITF entry
- PR = Protected ranking
- SR = Special ranking
- SE = Special exempt
- JE = Junior exempt
- JR = Junior Accelerator Programme entrant
- CO = College Accelerator Programme entrant
- NG = Next Gen Accelerator Program entrant
- w/o = Walkover
- r = Retired
- d = Defaulted

=== Draw ===
First round
1	(Italy) S Errani (Italy) R Vinci	6	6
(Croatia) D Jurak (Hungary) K Marosi	2	4
(South Africa) N Grandin (Czech Republic) V Uhlířová	4	2
WC	(Australia) J Gajdošová (Australia) O Rogowska	6	6
4	(Germany) A-L Grönefeld (Czech Republic) K Peschke	1	6	[10]
(Spain) N Llagostera Vives (Slovakia) D Cibulková	6	4	[8]
(Spain) A Parra Santonja (Poland) A Rosolska	3	0
(Uzbekistan) A Amanmuradova (United States) V King	6	6
(Bosnia and Herzegovina) M Jugić-Salkić (Russia) A Panova	4	4
(Slovakia) D Hantuchová (Slovenia) K Srebotnik	6	6
(Russia) A Pavlyuchenkova (Czech Republic) L Šafářová	6	6^{6}	[10]
3	(United States) R Kops-Jones (United States) A Spears	2	7^{8}	[6]
(United States) B Mattek-Sands (India) S Mirza	6	6
(Russia) V Dushevina (Belarus) O Govortsova	4	2
(Czech Republic) E Birnerová (Czech Republic) L Hradecká	3	3
2	(United States) L Huber (Spain) MJ Martínez Sánchez	6	6

Quarterfinals
1	(Italy) S Errani (Italy) R Vinci	w/o
WC	(Australia) J Gajdošová (Australia) O Rogowska
4	(Germany) A-L Grönefeld (Czech Republic) K Peschke	6	6
(Uzbekistan) A Amanmuradova (United States) V King	1	2
(Slovakia) D Hantuchová (Slovenia) K Srebotnik	6	6
(Russia) A Pavlyuchenkova (Czech Republic) L Šafářová	2	4
(United States) B Mattek-Sands (India) S Mirza	6	6
2	(United States) L Huber (Spain) MJ Martínez Sánchez	2	3

Semifinals
1	(Italy) S Errani (Italy) R Vinci	4	1
4	(Germany) A-L Grönefeld (Czech Republic) K Peschke	6	6
(Slovakia) D Hantuchová (Slovenia) K Srebotnik	1^{r}
(United States) B Mattek-Sands (India) S Mirza	5

Final
4	(Germany) A-L Grönefeld (Czech Republic) K Peschke	6	4	[7]
(United States) B Mattek-Sands (India) S Mirza	4	6	[10]
