= 2011 If Stockholm Open – Singles =

Singles
- 2011 If Stockholm Open

Final
- Champion: (France) Gaël Monfils
- Runner-up: (Finland) Jarkko Nieminen
- Score: 7–5, 3–6, 6–2

Details
- Draw: 28
- Seeds: 8

Events
| Singles | Doubles |
- If Stockholm Open

Roger Federer was the defending champion, but decided not to participate.

Gaël Monfils won the title beating Jarkko Nieminen in the final, for his first title of the year.

== Seeds ==
The top four seeds received a bye into the second round.

1. (France) Gaël Monfils (champion)
2. (Argentina) Juan Martín del Potro (second round)
3. (Switzerland) Stanislas Wawrinka (second round)
4. (Argentina) Juan Ignacio Chela (second round)
5. (South Africa) Kevin Anderson (Quarterfinal)
6. (Canada) Milos Raonic (semifinals)
7. (Croatia) Ivan Dodig (second round)
8. (Spain) Tommy Robredo (first round)

== Draw ==
Key

- Q = Qualifier
- WC = Wild card
- LL = Lucky loser
- Alt = Alternate
- ITF = ITF entry
- PR = Protected ranking
- SR = Special ranking
- SE = Special exempt
- JE = Junior exempt
- JR = Junior Accelerator Programme entrant
- CO = College Accelerator Programme entrant
- NG = Next Gen Accelerator Program entrant
- w/o = Walkover
- r = Retired
- d = Defaulted

=== Finals ===
Semifinals
1 | (France) Gaël Monfils | 6^{6} | 6 | 6
6 | (Canada) Milos Raonic | 7^{8} | 4 | 3
(Finland) Jarkko Nieminen | 7^{7} | 5 | 6
(United States) James Blake | 6^{5} | 7 | 2

Final
1 | (France) Gaël Monfils | 7 | 3 | 6
(Finland) Jarkko Nieminen | 5 | 6 | 2

=== Top half ===
First round
Q | (Estonia) J Zopp | 6^{5} | 6 | 0
WC | (Australia) B Tomic | 7^{7} | 4 | 6
WC | (Germany) T Haas | 7^{7} | 6
(India) S Devvarman | 6^{4} | 4
(Spain) G García López | 6^{1} | 6^{4}
5 | (South Africa) K Anderson | 7^{7} | 7^{7}
(United States) R Sweeting | 3 | 1
(Bulgaria) G Dimitrov | 6 | 6
(Germany) P Petzschner | 6 | 7
(Poland) Ł Kubot | 2 | 5
(Cyprus) M Baghdatis | 6^{5} | 7^{7} | 4
6 | (Canada) M Raonic | 7^{7} | 6^{4} | 6

Second round
1 | (France) G Monfils | 6 | 6^{4} | 6
WC | (Australia) B Tomic | 4 | 7^{7} | 4
WC | (Germany) T Haas | 7^{7} | 4 | 4
5 | (South Africa) K Anderson | 6^{3} | 6 | 6
4 | (Argentina) JI Chela | 2 | 7 | 1
(Bulgaria) G Dimitrov | 6 | 5 | 6
(Germany) P Petzschner | 3 | 3
6 | (Canada) M Raonic | 6 | 6

Quarterfinals
1 | (France) G Monfils | 7 | 7
5 | (South Africa) K Anderson | 5 | 5
(Bulgaria) G Dimitrov | 5 | 4
6 | (Canada) M Raonic | 7 | 6

Semifinals
1 | (France) G Monfils | 6^{6} | 6 | 6
6 | (Canada) M Raonic | 7^{8} | 4 | 3

=== Bottom half ===
First round
8 | (Spain) T Robredo | 2 | 3
Q | (Germany) T Kamke | 6 | 6
WC | (Sweden) M Ryderstedt | 4 | 6 | 3
Q | (Germany) S Rieschick | 6 | 3 | 6
(Finland) J Nieminen | 6 | 7^{7}
Q | (Romania) M Copil | 3 | 6^{4}
7 | (Croatia) I Dodig | 7^{7} | 7^{8}
(France) A Mannarino | 6^{5} | 6^{6}
(Argentina) D Nalbandian | 4 | 7^{8} | 7^{7}
(Belgium) X Malisse | 6 | 6^{6} | 6^{3}
(United States) J Blake | 7^{8} | 6
(Belgium) O Rochus | 6^{6} | 3

Second round
Q | (Germany) T Kamke | 6 | 6
Q | (Germany) S Rieschick | 3 | 1
(Finland) J Nieminen | 6 | 6
3 | (Switzerland) S Wawrinka | 3 | 4
7 | (Croatia) I Dodig | 1 | 1
(Argentina) D Nalbandian | 6 | 6
(United States) J Blake | 6 | 6
2 | (Argentina) JM del Potro | 4 | 4

Quarterfinals
Q | (Germany) T Kamke | 6 | 5 | 1
(Finland) J Nieminen | 3 | 7 | 6
(Argentina) D Nalbandian
(United States) J Blake | w/o

Semifinals
(Finland) J Nieminen | 7^{7} | 5 | 6
(United States) J Blake | 6^{5} | 7 | 2
