= 2011 If Stockholm Open – Doubles =

Doubles
- 2011 If Stockholm Open

Final
- Champions: (India) Rohan Bopanna (Pakistan) Aisam-ul-Haq Qureshi
- Runners-up: (Brazil) Marcelo Melo (Brazil) Bruno Soares
- Score: 6–1, 6–3

Events
Singles	Doubles
← 2010 ·	If Stockholm Open	· 2012 →

Eric Butorac and Jean-Julien Rojer were the defending champions, but were eliminated by Marcelo Melo and Bruno Soares in the semifinals.
Rohan Bopanna and Aisam-ul-Haq Qureshi won the title, defeating Melo and Soares in the final.

== Seeds ==
1. (India) Rohan Bopanna / (Pakistan) Aisam-ul-Haq Qureshi (champions)
2. (United States) Eric Butorac / (Curaçao) Jean-Julien Rojer (semifinals)
3. (Germany) Christopher Kas / (Austria) Alexander Peya (first round)
4. (Brazil) Marcelo Melo / (Brazil) Bruno Soares (final)

== Draw ==
=== Key ===
- Q = Qualifier
- WC = Wild card
- LL = Lucky loser
- Alt = Alternate
- SE = Special exempt
- PR = Protected ranking
- ITF = ITF entry
- JE = Junior exempt
- w/o = Walkover
- r = Retired
- d = Defaulted
- SR = Special ranking

=== Draw ===
First round
1	(India) R Bopanna (Pakistan) A-u-H Qureshi	6	6
(Austria) J Knowle (Poland) Ł Kubot	4	4
(Germany) M Kohlmann (Germany) A Waske	4	6	[10]
WC	(Germany) M Emmrich (Sweden) A Siljeström	6	2	[3]
3	(Germany) C Kas (Austria) A Peya	7	3	[10]
(Israel) J Erlich (Israel) A Ram	5	6	[12]
(United States) S Lipsky (United States) R Ram	6	5	[6]
(Cyprus) M Baghdatis (Argentina) JM del Potro	4	7	[10]
WC	(Sweden) J Brunström (Finland) J Nieminen	7^{9}	6^{4}	[8]
(Argentina) JI Chela (Brazil) A Sá	6^{7}	7^{7}	[10]
(Germany) M Bachinger (Germany) P Petzschner	3	6^{0}
4	(Brazil) M Melo (Brazil) B Soares	6	7^{7}
(Australia) P Hanley (Belgium) D Norman	6^{4}	3
(Belgium) X Malisse (Germany) F Moser	7^{7}	6
(Spain) M López (Spain) T Robredo	6^{1}	2
2	(United States) E Butorac (Curaçao) J-J Rojer	7^{7}	6

Quarterfinals
1	(India) R Bopanna (Pakistan) A-u-H Qureshi	7^{7}	7
(Germany) M Kohlmann (Germany) A Waske	6^{5}	5
(Israel) J Erlich (Israel) A Ram	4	5
(Cyprus) M Baghdatis (Argentina) JM del Potro	6	7
(Argentina) JI Chela (Brazil) A Sá	3	4
4	(Brazil) M Melo (Brazil) B Soares	6	6
(Belgium) X Malisse (Germany) F Moser	3	4
2	(United States) E Butorac (Curaçao) J-J Rojer	6	6

Semifinals
1	(India) R Bopanna (Pakistan) A-u-H Qureshi	2	6	[10]
(Cyprus) M Baghdatis (Argentina) JM del Potro	6	2	[8]
4	(Brazil) M Melo (Brazil) B Soares	7^{7}	6
2	(United States) E Butorac (Curaçao) J-J Rojer	6^{4}	3

Final
1	(India) R Bopanna (Pakistan) A-u-H Qureshi	6	6
4	(Brazil) M Melo (Brazil) B Soares	1	3
