= 2013 If Stockholm Open =

- Date: 14–20 October
- Edition: 45th
- Category: ATP World Tour 250
- Draw: 28S / 16D
- Prize money: €530,165
- Surface: Hard / Indoor
- Location: Stockholm, Sweden
- Venue: Kungliga tennishallen

Champions

Singles
- (Bulgaria) Grigor Dimitrov

Doubles
- (Pakistan) Aisam-ul-Haq Qureshi / (Netherlands) Jean-Julien Rojer
← 2012 ·	Stockholm Open	· 2014 →

The 2013 If Stockholm Open was a professional men's tennis tournament played on indoor hard courts. It was the 45th edition of the tournament, and part of the ATP World Tour 250 series of the 2013 ATP World Tour. It took place at the Kungliga tennishallenin Stockholm, Sweden between 14 and 20 October 2013.

== Singles main-draw entrants ==
=== Seeds ===
Country	Player	Rank^{1}	Seed
ESP	David Ferrer	4	1
CAN	Milos Raonic	11	2
POL	Jerzy Janowicz	15	3
RSA	Kevin Anderson	20	4
LAT	Ernests Gulbis	26	5
FRA	Benoît Paire	27	6
BUL	Grigor Dimitrov	28	7
CRO	Ivan Dodig	29	8

- ^{1} Rankings are as of October 7, 2013

=== Other entrants ===
The following players received wildcards into the singles main draw:

- (Sweden) Markus Eriksson
- (France) Benoît Paire
- (Canada) Milos Raonic

The following players received entry from the qualifying draw:

- (Romania) Marius Copil
- (Sweden) Joachim Johansson
- (Germany) Nils Langer
- (Sweden) Milos Sekulic

=== Withdrawals ===
Before the tournament

- (United States) Brian Baker
- (Croatia) Marin Čilić (suspension)
- (Belgium) David Goffin
- (United States) Sam Querrey
- (Russia) Mikhail Youzhny

During the tournament

- (Spain) Fernando Verdasco (abdominal injury)

=== Retirements ===
- (Estonia) Jürgen Zopp (lower back injury)

== Doubles main-draw entrants ==
=== Seeds ===
Country	Player	Country	Player	Rank^{1}	Seed
PAK	Aisam-ul-Haq Qureshi	NED	Jean-Julien Rojer	26	1
~~CRO~~	~~Ivan Dodig~~	~~BRA~~	~~Marcelo Melo~~	~~30~~	~~2~~
ESP	David Marrero	ESP	Fernando Verdasco	39	3
MEX	Santiago González	USA	Scott Lipsky	64	4

- Rankings are as of October 7, 2013

=== Other entrants ===
The following pairs received wildcards into the doubles main draw:

- (Sweden) Isak Arvidsson / (Sweden) Andreas Siljeström
- (Sweden) Jonas Björkman / (Sweden) Robert Lindstedt

The following pair received entry as alternates:

- (Sweden) Patrik Rosenholm / (Sweden) Milos Sekulic

=== Withdrawals ===
Before the tournament

- (Brazil) Marcelo Melo (abdominal injury)

During the tournament

- (Spain) Fernando Verdasco (abdominal injury)

== Finals ==
=== Singles ===
- (Bulgaria) Grigor Dimitrov defeated (Spain) David Ferrer, 2–6, 6–3, 6–4

=== Doubles ===
- (Pakistan) Aisam-ul-Haq Qureshi / (Netherlands) Jean-Julien Rojer defeated (Sweden) Jonas Björkman / (Sweden) Robert Lindstedt, 6–2, 6–2
