= 2011 If Stockholm Open =

- Date: 17–23 October
- Edition: 43rd
- Category: ATP World Tour 250
- Draw: 28S / 16D
- Prize money: €531,000
- Surface: Hard / Indoor
- Location: Stockholm, Sweden
- Venue: Kungliga tennishallen

Champions

Singles
- (France) Gaël Monfils

Doubles
- (India) Rohan Bopanna / (Pakistan) Aisam-ul-Haq Qureshi
← 2010 ·	Stockholm Open	· 2012 →

The 2011 If Stockholm Open was a professional men's tennis tournament played on indoor hard courts. It was the 43rd edition of the tournament, which was part of the 2011 ATP World Tour. It took place at the Kungliga tennishallen in Stockholm, Sweden between 17 and 23 October 2011. First-seeded Gaël Monfils won the singles title.

== Finals ==
=== Singles ===
(France) Gaël Monfils defeated (Finland) Jarkko Nieminen, 7–5, 3–6, 6–2

- It was Monfils' 1st title of the year and 4th of his career.

=== Doubles ===
(India) Rohan Bopanna / (Pakistan) Aisam-ul-Haq Qureshi defeated (Brazil) Marcelo Melo / (Brazil) Bruno Soares, 6–1, 6–3

== ATP entrants ==
=== Seeds ===
Country	Player	Rank^{1}	Seed
FRA	Gaël Monfils	10	1
ARG	Juan Martín del Potro	14	2
SUI	Stanislas Wawrinka	19	3
ARG	Juan Ignacio Chela	29	4
RSA	Kevin Anderson	30	5
CAN	Milos Raonic	31	6
CRO	Ivan Dodig	32	7
ESP	Tommy Robredo	46	8

- ^{1} Rankings are as of October 10, 2011.

=== Other entrants ===
The following players received wildcards into the singles main draw:

- (Germany) Tommy Haas
- (Sweden) Michael Ryderstedt
- (Australia) Bernard Tomic

The following players received entry from the qualifying draw:

- (Romania) Marius Copil
- (Germany) Tobias Kamke
- (Germany) Sebastian Rieschick
- (Estonia) Jürgen Zopp
