= 2013 Brisbane International – Women's singles =

Coordinates: 27°31′30″S 153°0′26″E

Women's singles
- 2013 Brisbane International

Final
- Champion: (United States) Serena Williams
- Runner-up: (Russia) Anastasia Pavlyuchenkova
- Score: 6–2, 6–1

Details
- Draw: 30
- Seeds: 8

Events
Singles	men	women
Doubles	men	women
- Brisbane International

Kaia Kanepi was the defending champion, but decided not to participate.

Serena Williams won the title, defeating Anastasia Pavlyuchenkova in the final 6–2, 6–1.

== Seeds ==
1. (Belarus) Victoria Azarenka (semifinals, withdrew because of a right toe injury)
2. (Russia) Maria Sharapova (withdrew because of a right collarbone injury)
3. (United States) Serena Williams (champion)
4. (Germany) Angelique Kerber (quarterfinals)
5. (Italy) Sara Errani (second round)
6. (Czech Republic) Petra Kvitová (second round)
7. (Australia) Samantha Stosur (first round)
8. (Denmark) Caroline Wozniacki (first round)

== Draw ==
=== Finals ===
Semifinals
1	(Belarus) Victoria Azarenka
3	(United States) Serena Williams	w/o
(Russia) Anastasia Pavlyuchenkova	4	6	6
LL	(Ukraine) Lesia Tsurenko	6	1	2

Final
3	(United States) Serena Williams	6	6
(Russia) Anastasia Pavlyuchenkova	2	1

=== Top half ===
First round
(Germany) S Lisicki	6	6
(Czech Republic) L Šafářová	2	4
(Poland) U Radwańska	2	6	6
(Austria) T Paszek	6	0	2
Q	(Kazakhstan) K Pervak	2	6	7^{7}
8	(Denmark) C Wozniacki	6	3	6^{1}
3	(United States) S Williams	6	6
(United States) V Lepchenko	2	1
(France) A Cornet	2	6	6
Q	(Australia) B Bobusic	6	3	1
(United States) S Stephens	6	6
(Slovakia) D Cibulková	2	3
(Sweden) S Arvidsson	7^{7}	7
7	(Australia) S Stosur	6^{4}	5

Second round
1	(Belarus) V Azarenka	6	6
(Germany) S Lisicki	3	3
(Poland) U Radwańska	6	2	6^{6}
Q	(Kazakhstan) K Pervak	3	6	7^{8}
3	(United States) S Williams	6	6
(France) A Cornet	2	2
(United States) S Stephens	6	6
(Sweden) S Arvidsson	3	4

Quarterfinals
1	(Belarus) V Azarenka	6	6
Q	(Kazakhstan) K Pervak	1	0
3	(United States) S Williams	6	6
(United States) S Stephens	4	3

Semifinals
1	(Belarus) V Azarenka
3	(United States) S Williams	w/o

=== Bottom half ===
First round
6	(Czech Republic) P Kvitová	6	6
(Spain) C Suárez Navarro	3	4
(Czech Republic) L Hradecká	3	6	3
(Russia) A Pavlyuchenkova	6	3	6
WC	(Australia) O Rogowska	2	3
Q	(Puerto Rico) M Puig	6	6
(Georgia (country)) A Tatishvili	2	6	2
4	(Germany) A Kerber	6	4	6
5	(Italy) S Errani	6	6
Q	(Russia) O Puchkova	1	3
(Slovakia) D Hantuchová	7	6
(Spain) L Domínguez Lino	5	2
(Italy) R Vinci	6	1	3
WC	(Australia) J Gajdošová	4	6	6

Second round
6	(Czech Republic) P Kvitová	4	5
(Russia) A Pavlyuchenkova	6	7
Q	(Puerto Rico) M Puig	6	4	6^{7}
4	(Germany) A Kerber	3	6	7^{9}
5	(Italy) S Errani	6	1	5
(Slovakia) D Hantuchová	4	6	7
WC	(Australia) J Gajdošová	6	1	4
LL	(Ukraine) L Tsurenko	1	6	6

Quarterfinals
(Russia) A Pavlyuchenkova	7^{7}	7^{7}
4	(Germany) A Kerber	6^{3}	6^{3}
(Slovakia) D Hantuchová	3	4
LL	(Ukraine) L Tsurenko	6	6

Semifinals
(Russia) A Pavlyuchenkova	4	6	6
LL	(Ukraine) L Tsurenko	6	1	2

== Qualifying ==
=== Seeds ===
1. (United States) Vania King (qualifying competition)
2. (Italy) Camila Giorgi (first round)
3. (Russia) Alexandra Panova (first round)
4. (Spain) María Teresa Torró Flor (first round)
5. (Kazakhstan) Ksenia Pervak (qualified)
6. (Czech Republic) Kristýna Plíšková (qualifying competition)
7. (Russia) Olga Puchkova (qualified)
8. (Serbia) Vesna Dolonc (first round)

=== Qualifiers ===
1. (Kazakhstan) Ksenia Pervak
2. (Puerto Rico) Monica Puig
3. (Australia) Bojana Bobusic
4. (Russia) Olga Puchkova

=== Lucky losers ===
1. (Ukraine) Lesia Tsurenko

=== Qualifying draw ===
==== First qualifier ====
First round
1	(United States) Vania King	4	6	6
(Argentina) Paula Ormaechea	6	3	4
(Russia) Daria Gavrilova	6	6
(Colombia) Mariana Duque	2	3
(Russia) Marta Sirotkina	5	6	7^{7}
(Australia) Monique Adamczak	7	4	6^{5}
(United States) Alexa Glatch	5	2
5	(Kazakhstan) Ksenia Pervak	7	6

Second round
1	(United States) Vania King	7^{7}	6^{6}	6
(Russia) Daria Gavrilova	6^{0}	7^{8}	2
(Russia) Marta Sirotkina	3	2
5	(Kazakhstan) Ksenia Pervak	6	6

Qualifying competition
1	(United States) Vania King	6^{0}	6	3
5	(Kazakhstan) Ksenia Pervak	7^{7}	3	6

==== Second qualifier ====
First round
2	(Italy) Camila Giorgi	3	3
(Russia) Vera Dushevina	6	6
WC	(Australia) Viktorija Rajicic	4	1
(Puerto Rico) Monica Puig	6	6
(United States) Bethanie Mattek-Sands	6	6
WC	(Australia) Lizette Cabrera	4	2
(Spain) María José Martínez Sánchez	6^{5}	6	7^{7}
8	(Serbia) Vesna Dolonc	7^{7}	1	6^{4}

Second round
(Russia) Vera Dushevina	4	6	1
(Puerto Rico) Monica Puig	6	3	6
(United States) Bethanie Mattek-Sands	6	6
(Spain) María José Martínez Sánchez	3	4

Qualifying competition
(Puerto Rico) Monica Puig	1	7	6
(United States) Bethanie Mattek-Sands	6	5	3

==== Third qualifier ====
First round
3	(Russia) Alexandra Panova	6	2	4
(Italy) Karin Knapp	4	6	6
WC	(Australia) Bojana Bobusic	3	6	6
WC	(Russia) Arina Rodionova	6	4	2
(Japan) Kurumi Nara	3	2
(Spain) Estrella Cabeza Candela	6	6
(Brazil) Teliana Pereira	6^{4}	3
6	(Czech Republic) Kristýna Plíšková	7^{7}	6

Second round
(Italy) Karin Knapp	4	6	4
WC	(Australia) Bojana Bobusic	6	2	6
(Spain) Estrella Cabeza Candela	2	4
6	(Czech Republic) Kristýna Plíšková	6	6

Qualifying competition
WC	(Australia) Bojana Bobusic	6	4	6
6	(Czech Republic) Kristýna Plíšková	4	6	4

==== Fourth qualifier ====
First round
4	(Spain) María Teresa Torró Flor	3	1
(United Kingdom) Johanna Konta	6	6
(United States) Mallory Burdette	2	5
(Ukraine) Lesia Tsurenko	6	7
(Czech Republic) Eva Birnerová	4	6^{5}
(Uzbekistan) Akgul Amanmuradova	6	7^{7}
(Czech Republic) Karolína Plíšková	6^{6}	6^{1}
7	(Russia) Olga Puchkova	7^{8}	7^{7}

Second round
(United Kingdom) Johanna Konta	4	6	5
(Ukraine) Lesia Tsurenko	6	1	7
(Uzbekistan) Akgul Amanmuradova	3	5
7	(Russia) Olga Puchkova	6	7

Qualifying competition
(Ukraine) Lesia Tsurenko	3	3
7	(Russia) Olga Puchkova	6	6
