= 2012 If Stockholm Open =

- Date: 15–21 October
- Edition: 44th
- Category: ATP World Tour 250
- Draw: 28S / 16D
- Prize money: €486,750
- Surface: Hard / Indoor
- Location: Stockholm, Sweden
- Venue: Kungliga tennishallen

Champions

Singles
- (Czech Republic) Tomáš Berdych

Doubles
- (Brazil) Marcelo Melo / (Brazil) Bruno Soares
← 2011 ·	Stockholm Open	· 2013 →

The 2012 If Stockholm Open was a professional men's tennis tournament played on indoor hard courts. It was the 44th edition of the tournament, and part of the ATP World Tour 250 series of the 2012 ATP World Tour. It took place at the Kungliga tennishallen in Stockholm, Sweden between 15 and 21 October 2012. Tomáš Berdych won the singles title.

== Finals ==
=== Singles ===
- (Czech Republic) Tomáš Berdych defeated (France) Jo-Wilfried Tsonga, 4–6, 6–4, 6–4

=== Doubles ===
- (Brazil) Marcelo Melo / (Brazil) Bruno Soares defeated (Sweden) Robert Lindstedt / (Serbia) Nenad Zimonjić, 6–7^{(7–4)}, 6–4, [10–6]

== Singles main-draw entrants ==
=== Seeds ===
Country	Player	Rank^{1}	Seed
FRA	Jo-Wilfried Tsonga	6	1
CZE	Tomáš Berdych	7	2
ESP	Nicolás Almagro	11	3
GER	Florian Mayer	25	4
ESP	Feliciano López	29	5
RUS	Mikhail Youzhny	30	6
CYP	Marcos Baghdatis	36	7
FIN	Jarkko Nieminen	37	8

- ^{1} Rankings are as of October 8, 2012

=== Other entrants ===
The following players received wildcards into the singles main draw:

- (Spain) Nicolás Almagro
- (Australia) Lleyton Hewitt
- (Sweden) Patrik Rosenholm

The following players received entry from the qualifying draw:

- (Romania) Marius Copil
- (Argentina) Federico Delbonis
- (Belgium) Yannick Mertens
- (France) Maxime Teixeira

=== Retirements ===
- (Cyprus) Marcos Baghdatis (left groin injury)
- (Colombia) Alejandro Falla

== Doubles main-draw entrants ==
=== Seeds ===
Country	Player	Country	Player	Rank^{1}	Seed
SWE	Robert Lindstedt	SRB	Nenad Zimonjić	21	1
PAK	Aisam-ul-Haq Qureshi	NED	Jean-Julien Rojer	29	2
BRA	Marcelo Melo	BRA	Bruno Soares	39	3
MEX	Santiago González	USA	Scott Lipsky	56	4

- Rankings are as of October 8, 2012

=== Other entrants ===
The following pairs received wildcards into the doubles main draw:

- (Sweden) Filip Bergevi / (Sweden) Fred Simonsson
- (United States) Brian Baker / (Sweden) Andreas Siljeström

The following pair received entry as alternates:

- (Sweden) Patrik Rosenholm / (Sweden) Milos Sekulic

=== Withdrawals ===
- (France) Gaël Monfils (right knee injury)

=== Retirements ===
- (Cyprus) Marcos Baghdatis (neck pain)
