= 2013 If Stockholm Open – Doubles =

Tennis tournament

Doubles
- 2013 If Stockholm Open

Final
- Champions: (Pakistan) Aisam-ul-Haq Qureshi (Netherlands) Jean-Julien Rojer
- Runners-up: (Sweden) Jonas Björkman (Sweden) Robert Lindstedt
- Score: 6–2, 6–2

Events
Singles	Doubles
- If Stockholm Open

Marcelo Melo and Bruno Soares were the defending champions, but Soares chose to compete in Vienna instead. Melo was scheduled to play alongside Ivan Dodig, but withdrew due to an abdominal injury.
Aisam-ul-Haq Qureshi and Jean-Julien Rojer won the title, defeating Jonas Björkman and Robert Lindstedt in the final, 6–2, 6–2.

== Seeds ==
1. (Pakistan) Aisam-ul-Haq Qureshi / (Netherlands) Jean-Julien Rojer (champions)
2. (Croatia) Ivan Dodig / (Brazil) Marcelo Melo (withdrew)
3. (Spain) David Marrero / (Spain) Fernando Verdasco (semifinal, withdrew)
4. (Mexico) Santiago González / (United States) Scott Lipsky (semifinals)

== Draw ==
Key

- Q = Qualifier
- WC = Wild card
- LL = Lucky loser
- Alt = Alternate
- ITF = ITF entry
- PR = Protected ranking
- SR = Special ranking
- SE = Special exempt
- JE = Junior exempt
- JR = Junior Accelerator Programme entrant
- CO = College Accelerator Programme entrant
- NG = Next Gen Accelerator Program entrant
- w/o = Walkover
- r = Retired
- d = Defaulted

=== Draw ===
First round
1	(Pakistan) A-u-H Qureshi (Netherlands) J-J Rojer	7^{7}	6
(Colombia) JS Cabal (Colombia) R Farah	6^{3}	4
(Germany) B Becker (Netherlands) I Sijsling	6	3	[8]
(Sweden) J Brunström (Finland) J Nieminen	2	6	[10]
3	(Spain) D Marrero (Spain) F Verdasco	1	6	[10]
(France) J Chardy (Bulgaria) G Dimitrov	6	2	[3]
(Poland) M Kowalczyk (Slovakia) I Zelenay	4	6^{4}
(Germany) G Kretschmer (Germany) A Satschko	6	7^{7}
(Germany) D Meffert (Austria) P Oswald	3	2
(United States) E Butorac (South Africa) R Klaasen	6	6
(United States) N Monroe (Germany) S Stadler	5	6	[7]
4	(Mexico) S González (United States) S Lipsky	7	2	[10]
WC	(Sweden) J Björkman (Sweden) R Lindstedt	6	5	[10]
WC	(Sweden) I Arvidsson (Sweden) A Siljeström	3	7	[3]
(Latvia) E Gulbis (Russia) D Tursunov	6	7^{7}
Alt	(Sweden) P Rosenholm (Sweden) M Sekulic	1	6^{3}

Quarterfinals
1	(Pakistan) A-u-H Qureshi (Netherlands) J-J Rojer	6	6
(Sweden) J Brunström (Finland) J Nieminen	3	4
3	(Spain) D Marrero (Spain) F Verdasco	6	7^{7}
(Germany) G Kretschmer (Germany) A Satschko	3	6^{1}
(United States) E Butorac (South Africa) R Klaasen	7	4	[6]
4	(Mexico) S González (United States) S Lipsky	5	6	[10]
WC	(Sweden) J Björkman (Sweden) R Lindstedt	4	6	[10]
(Latvia) E Gulbis (Russia) D Tursunov	6	1	[8]

Semifinals
1	(Pakistan) A-u-H Qureshi (Netherlands) J-J Rojer	w/o
3	(Spain) D Marrero (Spain) F Verdasco
4	(Mexico) S González (United States) S Lipsky	4	4
WC	(Sweden) J Björkman (Sweden) R Lindstedt	6	6

Final
1	(Pakistan) A-u-H Qureshi (Netherlands) J-J Rojer	6	6
WC	(Sweden) J Björkman (Sweden) R Lindstedt	2	2
