= 2010 Chang-Sat Bangkok 2 Open – Singles =

Singles
- 2010 Chang-Sat Bangkok 2 Open

Final
- Champions: (Bulgaria) Grigor Dimitrov
- Runners-up: (Russia) Alexandre Kudryavtsev
- Score: 6–4, 6–1

Events
Singles	Doubles
Chang-Sat Bangkok 2 Open

Grigor Dimitrov won the title. He defeated Alexandre Kudryavtsev 6–4, 6–1 in the final.

== Seeds ==
1. (Brazil) Ricardo Mello (second round, retired)
2. (Belgium) Olivier Rochus (withdrew)
3. (United States) Michael Russell (quarterfinals)
4. (Japan) Go Soeda (semifinals)
5. (Belgium) Steve Darcis (withdrew)
6. (Australia) Peter Luczak (withdrew)
7. (Croatia) Ivan Dodig (first round, retired)
8. (Germany) Denis Gremelmayr (semifinals)

== Draw ==
=== Key ===
- Q = Qualifier
- WC = Wild card
- LL = Lucky loser
- Alt = Alternate
- ITF = ITF entry
- PR = Protected ranking
- SR = Special ranking
- SE = Special exempt
- JE = Junior exempt
- JR = Junior Accelerator Programme entrant
- CO = College Accelerator Programme entrant
- NG = Next Gen Accelerator Program entrant
- w/o = Walkover
- r = Retired
- d = Defaulted

=== Finals ===
Semifinals
8	(Germany) Denis Gremelmayr	3	6	6^{5}
(Russia) Alexandre Kudryavtsev	6	1	7
4	(Japan) Go Soeda	3	4
(Bulgaria) Grigor Dimitrov	6	6

Final
(Russia) Alexandre Kudryavtsev	4	1
(Bulgaria) Grigor Dimitrov	6	6

=== Top half ===
First round
1	(Brazil) R Mello	6	7
WC	(Thailand) K Wachiramanowong	3	5
Q	(Denmark) F Nielsen	4	1
(Brazil) T Alves	6	6
LL	(India) Y Bhambri	7	6^{1}	1^{r}
Q	(United Kingdom) J Ward	6^{4}	7	1
(France) L Recouderc	4	6	1
8	(Germany) D Gremelmayr	6	1	6
3	(United States) M Russell	6	6
WC	(Thailand) P Siriluethaiwattana	2	3
(Russia) K Kravchuk	7	6
Q	(Germany) P Gojowczyk	6^{5}	4
(Japan) T Ito	3	3
(Russia) A Kudryavtsev	6	6
LL	(Chinese Taipei) T-h Yang	1	6	7
LL	(China) M-X Gong	6	3	5

Second round
1	(Brazil) R Mello	2^{r}
(Brazil) T Alves	4
Q	(United Kingdom) J Ward	4	2
8	(Germany) D Gremelmayr	6	6
3	(United States) M Russell	4	6	6
(Russia) K Kravchuk	6	3	3
(Russia) A Kudryavtsev	6	7
LL	(Chinese Taipei) T-h Yang	4	6^{2}

Quarterfinals
(Brazil) T Alves	4	3
8	(Germany) D Gremelmayr	6	6
3	(United States) M Russell	6	3	0
(Russia) A Kudryavtsev	4	6	6

Semifinals
8	(Germany) D Gremelmayr	3	6	6^{5}
(Russia) A Kudryavtsev	6	1	7

=== Bottom half ===
First round
LL	(United States) A Bogomolov Jr.	6	6
(New Zealand) D King-Turner	2	3
WC	(Thailand) D Udomchoke	6	6
(Australia) B Tomic	4	2
LL	(Australia) N Lindahl	3	4
Q	(United States) R DeHeart	6	6
(Russia) E Kirillov	1	1^{r}
4	(Japan) G Soeda	6	2
7	(Croatia) I Dodig	6	2	0^{r}
(Bulgaria) G Dimitrov	4	6	1
(Australia) M Ebden	6	6
(Japan) Y Sugita	1	1
(Canada) P Polansky	7	6
WC	(Thailand) W Doakmaiklee	5	1
(Australia) M Matosevic	2	7	5
LL	(Germany) S Rieschick	6	5	7

Second round
LL	(United States) A Bogomolov Jr.	6^{3}	1
WC	(Thailand) D Udomchoke	7	6
Q	(United States) R DeHeart	4	5
4	(Japan) G Soeda	6	7
(Bulgaria) G Dimitrov	6	6
(Australia) M Ebden	4	1
(Canada) P Polansky	6^{6}	1
LL	(Germany) S Rieschick	7	6

Quarterfinals
WC	(Thailand) D Udomchoke	4	6^{8}
4	(Japan) G Soeda	6	7
(Bulgaria) G Dimitrov	2	7	6
LL	(Germany) S Rieschick	6	6^{5}	3

Semifinals
4	(Japan) G Soeda	3	4
(Bulgaria) G Dimitrov	6	6
