= 2010 Chang-Sat Bangkok 2 Open =

- Date: 20 – 26 September
- Edition: 1st
- Location: Bangkok, Thailand

Champions

Singles
- (Bulgaria) Grigor Dimitrov

Doubles
- (Thailand) Sanchai Ratiwatana / (Thailand) Sonchat Ratiwatana
Chang-Sat Bangkok 2 Open

The 2010 Chang-Sat Bangkok 2 Open was a professional tennis tournament played on hard courts. It was the first edition of the tournament which was part of the 2010 ATP Challenger Tour. It took place in Bangkok, Thailand between 20 and 26 September 2010.

== ATP entrants ==
=== Seeds ===
Nationality	Player	Ranking*	Seeding
BRA	Ricardo Mello	75	1
BEL	~~Olivier Rochus~~	~~79~~	~~2~~
USA	Michael Russell	84	3
JPN	Go Soeda	110	4
BEL	~~Steve Darcis~~	~~117~~	~~5~~
AUS	~~Peter Luczak~~	~~126~~	~~6~~
CRO	Ivan Dodig	133	7
GER	Denis Gremelmayr	140	8

- Rankings are as of September 13, 2010.

=== Other entrants ===
The following players received wildcards into the singles main draw:

- (Thailand) Weerapat Doakmaiklee
- (Thailand) Peerakiat Siriluethaiwattana
- (Thailand) Danai Udomchoke
- (Thailand) Kittipong Wachiramanowong

The following players received entry from the qualifying draw:

- (United States) Ryler DeHeart
- (Germany) Peter Gojowczyk
- (Denmark) Frederik Nielsen
- (United Kingdom) James Ward

The following players received a lucky loser spot:

- (India) Yuki Bhambri
- (United States) Alex Bogomolov Jr.
- (China) Gong Maoxin
- (Australia) Nick Lindahl
- (Germany) Sebastian Rieschick
- (Chinese Taipei) Yang Tsung-hua

== Champions ==
=== Singles ===
(Bulgaria) Grigor Dimitrov def. (Russia) Alexandre Kudryavtsev, 6–4, 6–1

=== Doubles ===
(Thailand) Sanchai Ratiwatana / (Thailand) Sonchat Ratiwatana def. (Denmark) Frederik Nielsen / (Japan) Yuichi Sugita, 6–3, 7–5
