= 2013 Brisbane International =

Coordinates: 27°31′30″S 153°0′26″E

- Date: 30 December 2012 – 6 January 2013
- Edition: 5th
- Location: Tennyson, Brisbane, Queensland
- Venue: Queensland Tennis Centre

Champions

Men's singles
- (United Kingdom) Andy Murray

Women's singles
- (United States) Serena Williams

Men's doubles
- (Brazil) Marcelo Melo / (Spain) Tommy Robredo

Women's doubles
- (United States) Bethanie Mattek-Sands / (India) Sania Mirza
- Brisbane International

The 2013 Brisbane International was a joint 2013 ATP World Tour and 2013 WTA Tour tennis tournament, played on outdoor hard courts in Brisbane, Queensland, Australia. It was the 5th edition of the tournament and took place at the Queensland Tennis Centre in Tennyson. It was held from 30 December 2012 to 6 January 2013. It was part of the Australian Open Series in preparation for the first Grand Slam of the year.

== Finals ==
=== Men's singles ===
- (United Kingdom) Andy Murray defeated (Bulgaria) Grigor Dimitrov 7–6^{(7–0)}, 6–4
- It was Murray's 25th career title.

=== Women's singles ===
- (United States) Serena Williams defeated (Russia) Anastasia Pavlyuchenkova 6–2, 6–1
- It was Serena's 47th career title, 4th Premier-level title, and 8th overall Premier title. She has now won her past 16 matches.

=== Men's doubles ===
- (Brazil) Marcelo Melo / (Spain) Tommy Robredo defeated (United States) Eric Butorac / (Australia) Paul Hanley, 4–6, 6–1, [10–5]

=== Women's doubles ===
- (United States) Bethanie Mattek-Sands / (India) Sania Mirza defeated (Germany) Anna-Lena Grönefeld / (Czech Republic) Květa Peschke 4–6, 6–4, [10–7]

== Points and prize money ==
=== Point distribution ===
Event	W	F	SF	QF	Round of 16	Round of 32	Q	Q3	Q2	Q1
Men's singles	250	150	90	45	20	0	12	6	0	0
Men's doubles	250	150	90	45	0	—N/a	—N/a	—N/a	—N/a	—N/a
Women's singles	470	320	200	120	60	1	20	12	8	1
Women's doubles	470	320	200	120	1	—N/a	—N/a	—N/a	—N/a	—N/a

=== Prize money ===
Event	W	F	SF	QF	Round of 16	Round of 32	Q3	Q2	Q1
Men's singles	$78,800	$41,540	$22,500	$12,810	$7,550	$4,470	$720	$345	—N/a
Men's doubles *	$23,950	$12,590	$6,820	$3,900	$2,290	—N/a	—N/a	—N/a	—N/a
Women's singles	$162,987	$87,021	$46,487	$24,944	$13,393	$7,299	$3,812	$2,027	$1,134
Women's doubles *	$51,022	$27,212	$14,881	$7,582	$4,110	—N/a	—N/a	—N/a	—N/a

_{* per team}

== ATP singles main-draw entrants ==
=== Seeds ===
Country	Player	Rank^{1}	Seed
GBR	Andy Murray	3	1
CAN	Milos Raonic	13	2
FRA	Gilles Simon	16	3
UKR	Alexandr Dolgopolov	18	4
JPN	Kei Nishikori	19	5
GER	Florian Mayer	28	6
AUT	Jürgen Melzer	29	7
SVK	Martin Kližan	30	8

- ^{1} Rankings as of 24 December 2012

=== Other entrants ===
The following players received wildcards into the singles main draw:

- (Australia) Matthew Ebden
- (Australia) Lleyton Hewitt
- (Australia) Ben Mitchell

The following players received entry from the qualifying draw:

- (United States) Ryan Harrison
- (United States) Denis Kudla
- (United States) Jesse Levine
- (Australia) John Millman

The following player received entry as lucky loser:

- (Russia) Igor Kunitsyn

=== Withdrawals ===
Before the tournament

- (France) Paul-Henri Mathieu (personal reasons)
- (Czech Republic) Radek Štěpánek (eye infection)

=== Retirements ===
- (Finland) Jarkko Nieminen (migraine)
- (Japan) Kei Nishikori (left knee injury)

== ATP doubles main-draw entrants ==
=== Seeds ===
Country	Player	Country	Player	Rank^{1}	Seed
USA	Eric Butorac	AUS	Paul Hanley	77	1
GBR	Colin Fleming	GBR	Jamie Murray	102	2
COL	Juan Sebastián Cabal	COL	Robert Farah	110	3
RUS	Mikhail Elgin	UZB	Denis Istomin	116	4

- ^{1} Rankings as of 24 December 2012

=== Other entrants ===
The following pairs received wildcards into the doubles main draw:

- (Australia) Chris Guccione / (Australia) Lleyton Hewitt
- (Australia) Matthew Ebden / (Australia) Marinko Matosevic

The following pair received entry as alternates:

- (Australia) John Peers / (Australia) John-Patrick Smith

=== Withdrawals ===
- (Czech Republic) Radek Štěpánek (eye infection)

=== Retirements ===
- (Japan) Kei Nishikori (left knee injury)

== WTA singles main-draw entrants ==
=== Seeds ===
Country	Player	Rank^{1}	Seed
BLR	Victoria Azarenka	1	1
RUS	Maria Sharapova	2	2
USA	Serena Williams	3	3
GER	Angelique Kerber	5	4
ITA	Sara Errani	6	5
CZE	Petra Kvitová	8	6
AUS	Samantha Stosur	9	7
DEN	Caroline Wozniacki	10	8

- ^{1} Rankings as of 24 December 2012

=== Other entrants ===
The following players received wildcards into the singles main draw:

- (Australia) Jarmila Gajdošová
- (Australia) Olivia Rogowska

The following players received entry from the qualifying draw:

- (Australia) Bojana Bobusic
- (Kazakhstan) Ksenia Pervak
- (Russia) Olga Puchkova
- (Puerto Rico) Monica Puig

The following player received entry as lucky loser:

- (Ukraine) Lesia Tsurenko

=== Withdrawals ===
Before the tournament

- (Russia) Maria Sharapova (right collarbone injury)

During the tournament

- (Belarus) Victoria Azarenka (toe injury)

== WTA doubles main-draw entrants ==
=== Seeds ===
Country	Player	Country	Player	Rank^{1}	Seed
ITA	Sara Errani	ITA	Roberta Vinci	3	1
USA	Liezel Huber	ESP	María José Martínez Sánchez	23	2
USA	Raquel Kops-Jones	USA	Abigail Spears	27	3
GER	Anna-Lena Grönefeld	CZE	Květa Peschke	35	4

- ^{1} Rankings as of 24 December 2012

=== Other entrants ===
The following pairs received wildcards into the doubles main draw: −

- (Australia) Jarmila Gajdošová / (Australia) Olivia Rogowska
