= 2013 Brisbane International – Men's singles =

Coordinates: 27°31′30″S 153°0′26″E

Men's singles
- 2013 Brisbane International

Final
- Champion: (United Kingdom) Andy Murray
- Runner-up: (Bulgaria) Grigor Dimitrov
- Score: 7–6^{(7–0)}, 6–4

Details
- Draw: 28 (4 Q / 3 WC )
- Seeds: 8

Events
Singles	men	women
Doubles	men	women
- Brisbane International

Andy Murray was the defending champion, and successfully defended his title, defeating Grigor Dimitrov in the final, 7–6^{(7–0)}, 6–4.

== Seeds ==
The top four seeds received a bye into the second round.

1. (United Kingdom) Andy Murray (champion)
2. (Canada) Milos Raonic (second round)
3. (France) Gilles Simon (quarterfinals)
4. (Ukraine) Alexandr Dolgopolov (quarterfinals)
5. (Japan) Kei Nishikori (semifinals, retired because of a left knee injury)
6. (Germany) Florian Mayer (second round)
7. (Austria) Jürgen Melzer (quarterfinals)
8. (Slovakia) Martin Kližan (first round)

== Draw ==
=== Finals ===
Semifinals
1	(United Kingdom) Andy Murray	6	2
5	(Japan) Kei Nishikori	4	0^{r}
(Cyprus) Marcos Baghdatis	3	7	6^{5}
(Bulgaria) Grigor Dimitrov	6	5	7^{7}

Final
1	(United Kingdom) Andy Murray	7^{7}	6
(Bulgaria) Grigor Dimitrov	6^{0}	4

=== Top half ===
First round
(Japan) T Ito	4	1
Q	(Australia) J Millman	6	6
LL	(Russia) I Kunitsyn	3	6	2
WC	(Australia) L Hewitt	6	4	6
(Uzbekistan) D Istomin	6	6
8	(Slovakia) M Kližan	1	2
(France) J Benneteau	3	6	1
(Finland) J Nieminen	6	2	6
(Spain) T Robredo	6	7^{7}
Q	(United States) R Harrison	4	6^{4}
(Australia) M Matosevic	5	2
5	(Japan) K Nishikori	7	6

Second round
1	(United Kingdom) A Murray	6	5	6
Q	(Australia) J Millman	1	7	3
WC	(Australia) L Hewitt	5	5
(Uzbekistan) D Istomin	7	7
4	(Ukraine) A Dolgopolov	6	4
(Finland) J Nieminen	2	1^{r}
(Spain) T Robredo	3	3
5	(Japan) K Nishikori	6	6

Quarterfinals
1	(United Kingdom) A Murray	6	7^{7}
(Uzbekistan) D Istomin	3	6^{3}
4	(Ukraine) A Dolgopolov	4	6^{3}
5	(Japan) K Nishikori	6	7^{7}

Semifinals
1	(United Kingdom) A Murray	6	2
5	(Japan) K Nishikori	4	0^{r}

=== Bottom half ===
First round
6	(Germany) F Mayer	6	6
(Colombia) S Giraldo	4	4
WC	(Australia) B Mitchell	4	4
(Cyprus) M Baghdatis	6	6
Q	(Canada) J Levine	1	6^{8}
(Colombia) A Falla	6	7^{10}
7	(Austria) J Melzer	2	6	6
Q	(United States) D Kudla	6	4	4
WC	(Australia) M Ebden	2	2
(Belgium) D Goffin	6	6
(Bulgaria) G Dimitrov	6	7^{10}
(United States) B Baker	3	6^{8}

Second round
6	(Germany) F Mayer	4	2
(Cyprus) M Baghdatis	6	6
(Colombia) A Falla	6^{5}	6^{5}
3	(France) G Simon	7^{7}	7^{7}
7	(Austria) J Melzer	6	7^{7}
(Belgium) D Goffin	4	6^{4}
(Bulgaria) G Dimitrov	6	6
2	(Canada) M Raonic	3	4

Quarterfinals
(Cyprus) M Baghdatis	6	6
3	(France) G Simon	3	4
7	(Austria) J Melzer	3	2
(Bulgaria) G Dimitrov	6	6

Semifinals
(Cyprus) M Baghdatis	3	7	6^{5}
(Bulgaria) G Dimitrov	6	5	7^{7}

== Qualifying ==
=== Seeds ===
1. (Luxembourg) Gilles Müller (first round)
2. (United States) Ryan Harrison (qualified)
3. (Belgium) Olivier Rochus (first round)
4. (Canada) Jesse Levine (qualified)
5. (Lithuania) Ričardas Berankis (second round)
6. (Netherlands) Thiemo de Bakker (first round)
7. (United States) Tim Smyczek (first round)
8. (Russia) Alex Bogomolov Jr. (second round)

=== Qualifiers ===
1. (United States) Denis Kudla
2. (United States) Ryan Harrison
3. (Australia) John Millman
4. (Canada) Jesse Levine

=== Lucky losers ===
1. (Russia) Igor Kunitsyn

=== Qualifying draw ===
==== First qualifier ====
First round
1	(Luxembourg) Gilles Müller	1	6	6^{4}
(Russia) Igor Kunitsyn	6	4	7^{7}
(Australia) James Duckworth	6	7^{7}
WC	(Australia) Nick Kyrgios	1	6^{4}
(United States) Denis Kudla	6^{4}	6	7
WC	(Australia) John-Patrick Smith	7^{7}	4	5
(Germany) Dominik Meffert	5	6^{3}
5	(Lithuania) Ričardas Berankis	7	7^{7}

Second round
(Russia) Igor Kunitsyn	6^{8}	6	6
(Australia) James Duckworth	7^{10}	2	3
(United States) Denis Kudla	7^{7}	3	6
5	(Lithuania) Ričardas Berankis	6^{0}	6	4

Qualifying competition
(Russia) Igor Kunitsyn	4	6	3
(United States) Denis Kudla	6	1	6

==== Second qualifier ====
First round
2	(United States) Ryan Harrison	6	6
(Ukraine) Ivan Sergeyev	3	2
WC	(Australia) Matt Reid	4	6	4
(Germany) Bastian Knittel	6	2	6
(Czech Republic) Ivo Minář	1	6	6
(Germany) Simon Greul	6	1	2
(China) Wu Di	6	6
7	(United States) Tim Smyczek	4	3

Second round
2	(United States) Ryan Harrison	7	6
(Germany) Bastian Knittel	5	4
(Czech Republic) Ivo Minář	6	6
(China) Wu Di	4	4

Qualifying competition
2	(United States) Ryan Harrison	6	6
(Czech Republic) Ivo Minář	4	1

==== Third qualifier ====
First round
3	(Belgium) Olivier Rochus	3	4
(United States) Donald Young	6	6
(United States) Ryan Sweeting	1	3
(Germany) Mischa Zverev	6	6
(Australia) John Millman	6	6
WC	(Australia) Luke Saville	2	2
Alt	(Uzbekistan) Farrukh Dustov	2	0^{r}
8	(Russia) Alex Bogomolov Jr.	6	2

Second round
(United States) Donald Young	7	6
(Germany) Mischa Zverev	5	2
(Australia) John Millman	7	6
8	(Russia) Alex Bogomolov Jr.	5	3

Qualifying competition
(United States) Donald Young	4	2
(Australia) John Millman	6	6

==== Fourth qualifier ====
First round
4	(Canada) Jesse Levine	6	6
(Ukraine) Oleksandr Nedovyesov	4	3
(Canada) Frank Dancevic	6	6
(United States) Rhyne Williams	4	0
(United States) Jack Sock	6^{4}	6	4
(Japan) Hiroki Moriya	7	3	6
(United States) Steve Johnson	6	6
6	(Netherlands) Thiemo de Bakker	3	4

Second round
4	(Canada) Jesse Levine	7	3	6
(Canada) Frank Dancevic	5	6	2
(Japan) Hiroki Moriya	2	6	5
(United States) Steve Johnson	6	4	7

Qualifying competition
4	(Canada) Jesse Levine	7^{7}	6
(United States) Steve Johnson	6^{4}	3
