= Chang-Sat Bangkok 2 Open =

- 2010 Chang-SAT Bangkok 2 Open

Defunct tennis tournament
- Location: Bangkok, Thailand
- Category: ATP Challenger Tour
- Surface: Hard / Outdoors
- Draw: 32S/32Q/16D
- Prize money: €35,000+H

The Chang-Sat Bangkok 2 Open was a tennis tournament held in Bangkok, Thailand, in 2010.

== Past finals ==
=== Singles ===
Year	Champion	Runner-up	Score
2010	(Bulgaria) Grigor Dimitrov	(Russia) Alexandre Kudryavtsev	6–4, 6–1

=== Doubles ===
Year	Champions	Runners-up	Score
2010	(Thailand) Sanchai Ratiwatana (Thailand) Sonchat Ratiwatana	(Denmark) Frederik Nielsen (Japan) Yuichi Sugita	6–3, 7–5
