= Milos Sekulic =

Swedish tennis player

- Full name: Milos Sekulic
- Country (sports): Sweden
- Residence: Stockholm, Sweden
- Born: 4 November 1989 (age 35); Stockholm, Sweden
- Height: 1.78 m (5 ft 10 in)
- Turned pro: 2008
- Plays: Right-handed (two handed-backhand)
- Prize money: $65,894

Singles
- Career record: 0–1 (at ATP Tour level, Grand Slam level, and in Davis Cup)
- Career titles: 0
- Highest ranking: No. 643 (25 August 2014)

Doubles
- Career record: 0–3 (at ATP Tour level, Grand Slam level, and in Davis Cup)
- Career titles: 0
- Highest ranking: No. 288 (1 August 2016)
- Last updated on: 10 December 2019.

Milos Sekulic (Serbian: Милош Секулић, Miloš Sekulić, pronounced [mǐloʃ sêkulitɕ]; born 4 November 1989) is a Swedish professional tennis player. Sekulic has a career high ATP singles ranking of 643, achieved on 25 August 2014 and a career high ATP doubles ranking of 288, achieved on 1 August 2016. Sekulic made his ATP main draw debut at the 2012 If Stockholm Open, partnering Patrik Rosenholm, but they lost in the first round to the top seeds.

At the 2013 If Stockholm Open, Sekulic qualified for his home event, defeating Tobias Blomgren, Fred Simonsson and Julian Reister in the qualifying rounds. In the main draw he lost to Jan-Lennard Struff in the first round in straight sets.
