= Patrik Rosenholm =

Swedish tennis player

- Full name: Patrik Rosenholm
- Country (sports): Sweden
- Residence: Lidingö, Sweden
- Born: 5 March 1988 (age 37); Stockholm, Sweden
- Height: 1.78 m (5 ft 10 in)
- Turned pro: 2007
- Retired: 2017
- Plays: Right-handed (one handed-backhand)
- Prize money: $96,688

Singles
- Career record: 2–3 (at ATP Tour level, Grand Slam level, and in Davis Cup)
- Career titles: 0
- Highest ranking: No. 350 (17 November 2014)

Doubles
- Career record: 0–4 (at ATP Tour level, Grand Slam level, and in Davis Cup)
- Career titles: 0
- Highest ranking: No. 412 (6 February 2017)
- Last updated on: 23 September 2019.

Patrik Rosenholm (born 5 March 1988 in Stockholm) is a retired Swedish tennis player.

Rosenholm has a career high ATP singles ranking of 350, achieved in November 2014 and a career high ATP doubles ranking of 412, achieved in February 2017. Rosenholm made his ATP main draw debut at the 2011 Swedish Open, partnering Carl Bergman, but they lost in the first round to the fourth seeds.

Rosenholm was given a wildcard to the 2012 If Stockholm Open where in the first round he defeated world No. 47 Gaël Monfils, 6–3, 1–6, 6–3. In the second round he lost to the sixth seed Mikhail Youzhny.
