= 2011 PTT Thailand Open – Doubles =

Doubles
- 2011 PTT Thailand Open

Final
- Champions: (Austria) Oliver Marach (Pakistan) Aisam-ul-Haq Qureshi
- Runners-up: (Germany) Michael Kohlmann (Germany) Alexander Waske
- Score: 7–6^{(7–4)}, 7–6^{(7–5)}

Events
Singles	Doubles
← 2010 ·	PTT Thailand Open	· 2012 →

Christopher Kas and Viktor Troicki are the defending champions, but they decided not to participate this year.

Top seeded Oliver Marach and Aisam-ul-Haq Qureshi won the tournament beating unseeded German couple Michael Kohlmann and Alexander Waske in the final, 7–6^{(7–4)}, 7–6^{(7–5)}.

== Seeds ==
1. (Austria) Oliver Marach / (Pakistan) Aisam-ul-Haq Qureshi (champions)
2. (Israel) Jonathan Erlich / (Israel) Andy Ram (quarterfinals)
3. (Italy) Simone Bolelli / (Italy) Fabio Fognini (semifinals)
4. (Australia) Paul Hanley / (Belgium) Dick Norman (semifinals)

== Draw ==
=== Key ===
- Q = Qualifier
- WC = Wild card
- LL = Lucky loser
- Alt = Alternate
- SE = Special exempt
- PR = Protected ranking
- ITF = ITF entry
- JE = Junior exempt
- w/o = Walkover
- r = Retired
- d = Defaulted
- SR = Special ranking

== Draw ==
First round
1	(Austria) O Marach (Pakistan) A-u-H Qureshi	6	7^{7}
(United Kingdom) J Delgado (United Kingdom) J Marray	4	6^{1}
WC	(Thailand) D Udomchoke (Thailand) K Wachiramanowong	3	5
(United Kingdom) J Murray (Brazil) A Sá	6	7
3	(Italy) S Bolelli (Italy) F Fognini	7	3	[10]
(Bulgaria) G Dimitrov (Croatia) I Dodig	5	6	[4]
(Colombia) S Giraldo (Germany) T Kamke	7	7^{7}
WC	(Thailand) W Doakmaiklee (Thailand) S Ratiwatana	5	6^{4}
(Spain) P Andújar (Spain) G García-López	5	3
(Netherlands) R Haase (Netherlands) R Wassen	7	6
(United States) J Cerretani (Germany) P Marx	5	3
4	(Australia) P Hanley (Belgium) D Norman	7	6
(Germany) M Kohlmann (Germany) A Waske	6	7^{8}
(Australia) A Fisher (Germany) F Moser	1	6^{6}
(Sweden) J Brunström (Finland) J Nieminen	3	2
2	(Israel) J Erlich (Israel) A Ram	6	6

Quarterfinals
1	(Austria) O Marach (Pakistan) A-u-H Qureshi	6	2	[10]
(United Kingdom) J Murray (Brazil) A Sá	4	6	[7]
3	(Italy) S Bolelli (Italy) F Fognini	6	7^{8}
(Colombia) S Giraldo (Germany) T Kamke	2	6^{6}
(Netherlands) R Haase (Netherlands) R Wassen	4	3
4	(Australia) P Hanley (Belgium) D Norman	6	6
(Germany) M Kohlmann (Germany) A Waske	2	6	[10]
2	(Israel) J Erlich (Israel) A Ram	6	4	[7]

Semifinals
1	(Austria) O Marach (Pakistan) A-u-H Qureshi	6	6
3	(Italy) S Bolelli (Italy) F Fognini	4	1
4	(Australia) P Hanley (Belgium) D Norman	4	6^{4}
(Germany) M Kohlmann (Germany) A Waske	6	7^{7}

Final
1	(Austria) O Marach (Pakistan) A-u-H Qureshi	7^{7}	7^{7}
(Germany) M Kohlmann (Germany) A Waske	6^{4}	6^{5}
