= 2012 PTT Thailand Open – Doubles =

Doubles
- 2012 PTT Thailand Open

Final
- Champions: (Chinese Taipei) Lu Yen-hsun (Thailand) Danai Udomchoke
- Runners-up: (United States) Eric Butorac (Australia) Paul Hanley
- Score: 6–3, 6–4

Events
Singles	Doubles
← 2011 ·	PTT Thailand Open	· 2013 →

Oliver Marach and Aisam-ul-Haq Qureshi were the defending champions but decided not to participate.
Wildcards Lu Yen-hsun and Danai Udomchoke won the tournament, defeating Eric Butorac and Paul Hanley in the final, 6–3, 6–4.

== Seeds ==
1. (India) Leander Paes / (Romania) Horia Tecău (semifinals)
2. (Mexico) Santiago González / (United States) Scott Lipsky (first round)
3. (Spain) David Marrero / (Spain) Fernando Verdasco (quarterfinals)
4. (United States) Eric Butorac / (Australia) Paul Hanley (final)

== Draw ==
=== Key ===
- Q = Qualifier
- WC = Wild card
- LL = Lucky loser
- Alt = Alternate
- SE = Special exempt
- PR = Protected ranking
- ITF = ITF entry
- JE = Junior exempt
- w/o = Walkover
- r = Retired
- d = Defaulted
- SR = Special ranking

=== Draw ===
First round
1	(India) L Paes (Romania) H Tecău	6	7
(Netherlands) R Haase (Netherlands) J-J Rojer	4	5
(Serbia) J Tipsarević (Germany) A Waske	6	6
(Japan) T Ito (Japan) G Soeda	0	2
4	(United States) E Butorac (Australia) P Hanley	6	3	[10]
(Czech Republic) F Čermák (Slovakia) M Mertiňák	2	6	[4]
(Bulgaria) G Dimitrov (Australia) B Tomic	4	5
(Germany) C Kas (Serbia) V Troicki	6	7
(Spain) G García-López (Australia) M Matosevic	4	3
WC	(Thailand) Sa Ratiwatana (Thailand) So Ratiwatana	6	6
(France) G Monfils (France) G Simon	0	1
3	(Spain) D Marrero (Spain) F Verdasco	6	6
(Sweden) J Brunström (United Kingdom) J Marray	1	6	[9]
WC	(Chinese Taipei) Y-h Lu (Thailand) D Udomchoke	6	3	[11]
(United Kingdom) J Murray (Brazil) A Sá	6	3	[10]
2	(Mexico) S González (United States) S Lipsky	4	6	[7]

Quarterfinals
1	(India) L Paes (Romania) H Tecău	6	3	[10]
(Serbia) J Tipsarević (Germany) A Waske	0	6	[5]
4	(United States) E Butorac (Australia) P Hanley	6	6
(Germany) C Kas (Serbia) V Troicki	4	2
WC	(Thailand) Sa Ratiwatana (Thailand) So Ratiwatana	6	1	[10]
3	(Spain) D Marrero (Spain) F Verdasco	3	6	[6]
WC	(Chinese Taipei) Y-h Lu (Thailand) D Udomchoke	6	7
(United Kingdom) J Murray (Brazil) A Sá	4	5

Semifinals
1	(India) L Paes (Romania) H Tecău	7^{8}	4	[8]
4	(United States) E Butorac (Australia) P Hanley	6^{6}	6	[10]
WC	(Thailand) Sa Ratiwatana (Thailand) So Ratiwatana	7^{7}	6^{5}	[7]
WC	(Chinese Taipei) Y-h Lu (Thailand) D Udomchoke	6^{3}	7	[10]

Final
4	(United States) E Butorac (Australia) P Hanley	3	4
WC	(Chinese Taipei) Y-h Lu (Thailand) D Udomchoke	6	6
