= 2012 PTT Thailand Open – Singles =

Singles
- 2012 PTT Thailand Open

Final
- Champion: (France) Richard Gasquet
- Runner-up: (France) Gilles Simon
- Score: 6–2, 6–1

Details
- Draw: 28 (4 Q / 3 WC )
- Seeds: 8

Events
Singles	Doubles
← 2011 ·	PTT Thailand Open	· 2013 →

Andy Murray was the defending champion but decided not to participate.
Richard Gasquet won the title beating Gilles Simon in an all-French final, 6–2, 6–1.

== Seeds ==
1. (Serbia) Janko Tipsarević (semifinals)
2. (France) Richard Gasquet (champion)
3. (Canada) Milos Raonic (quarterfinals)
4. (France) Gilles Simon (final)
5. (Spain) Fernando Verdasco (quarterfinals)
6. (Serbia) Viktor Troicki (second round)
7. (Finland) Jarkko Nieminen (semifinals)
8. (Australia) Bernard Tomic (quarterfinals)

== Draw ==
=== Key ===
- Q = Qualifier
- WC = Wild card
- LL = Lucky loser
- Alt = Alternate
- SE = Special exempt
- PR = Protected ranking
- ITF = ITF entry
- JE = Junior exempt
- w/o = Walkover
- r = Retired
- d = Defaulted
- SR = Special ranking

=== Finals ===
Semifinals
1	(Serbia) Janko Tipsarević	4	4
4	(France) Gilles Simon	6	6
7	(Finland) Jarkko Nieminen	6	5	2
2	(France) Richard Gasquet	3	7	6

Final
4	(France) Gilles Simon	2	1
2	(France) Richard Gasquet	6	6

=== Top half ===
First round
Q	(Japan) H Moriya	2	7^{8}	6
(Netherlands) R Haase	6	6^{6}	3
(United States) D Young	5	6	7
(Chinese Taipei) Y-h Lu	7	2	5
(Japan) T Ito	6	0	2
5	(Spain) F Verdasco	3	6	6
WC	(Thailand) D Udomchoke	4	5
(Japan) G Soeda	6	7
(France) G Monfils	6	2	7
Q	(South Africa) K Anderson	4	6	5
(Ukraine) S Stakhovsky	7^{7}	5	3
6	(Serbia) V Troicki	6^{4}	7	6

Second round
1	(Serbia) J Tipsarević	6	6
Q	(Japan) H Moriya	4	4
(United States) D Young	5	4
5	(Spain) F Verdasco	7	6
4	(France) G Simon	6	6
(Japan) G Soeda	4	4
(France) G Monfils	7	7
6	(Serbia) V Troicki	5	5

Quarterfinals
1	(Serbia) J Tipsarević	7^{7}	6
5	(Spain) F Verdasco	6^{5}	4
4	(France) G Simon	6	6
(France) G Monfils	4	1

Semifinals
1	(Serbia) J Tipsarević	4	4
4	(France) G Simon	6	6

=== Bottom half ===
First round
7	(Finland) J Nieminen	6
Q	(Japan) Y Sugita	1	r
(Germany) P Petzschner	6	6
WC	(Thailand) P Siriluethaiwattana	1	2
(Australia) M Matosevic	3	4
(Croatia) I Karlović	6	6
8	(Australia) B Tomic	6	6
(Spain) G García-López	0	2
(Israel) D Sela	6	6
WC	(Switzerland) M Chiudinelli	4	4
Q	(Chinese Taipei) T-h Yang	3	6	6^{7}
(Bulgaria) G Dimitrov	6	3	7^{9}

Second round
7	(Finland) J Nieminen	7^{7}	6
(Germany) P Petzschner	6^{1}	2
(Croatia) I Karlović	6^{3}	4
3	(Canada) M Raonic	7^{7}	6
8	(Australia) B Tomic	4	6	6
(Israel) D Sela	6	3	4
(Bulgaria) G Dimitrov	7	5	4
2	(France) R Gasquet	5	7	6

Quarterfinals
7	(Finland) J Nieminen	6	7^{7}
3	(Canada) M Raonic	3	6^{3}
8	(Australia) B Tomic	6^{5}	4
2	(France) R Gasquet	7^{7}	6

Semifinals
7	(Finland) J Nieminen	6	5	2
2	(France) R Gasquet	3	7	6

== Qualifying ==
=== Seeds ===
1. (South Africa) Kevin Anderson (qualified)
2. (Japan) Yuichi Sugita (qualified)
3. (Germany) Mischa Zverev (qualifying competition)
4. (Japan) Hiroki Moriya (qualified)
5. (Chinese Taipei) Yang Tsung-hua (qualified)
6. (Kazakhstan) Evgeny Korolev (qualifying competition)
7. (Japan) Yasutaka Uchiyama (qualifying competition)
8. (New Zealand) Daniel King-Turner (second round)

=== Qualifiers ===
1. (South Africa) Kevin Anderson
2. (Japan) Yuichi Sugita
3. (Chinese Taipei) Yang Tsung-hua
4. (Japan) Hiroki Moriya

=== Draw ===
==== First qualifier ====
First round
(Canada) Kelsey Stevenson	1	6	4
(United Kingdom) Jamie Murray	6	3	6
(Thailand) Warit Sornbutnark	2	5
(United States) Eric Butorac	6	7
WC	(Thailand) Aviruth Phaphui	1	1
6	(Kazakhstan) Evgeny Korolev	6	6

Second round
1	(South Africa) Kevin Anderson	6	6
(United Kingdom) Jamie Murray	2	1
(United States) Eric Butorac	2	3
6	(Kazakhstan) Evgeny Korolev	6	6

Qualifying competition
1	(South Africa) Kevin Anderson	6	6
6	(Kazakhstan) Evgeny Korolev	1	2

==== Second qualifier ====
First round
(Netherlands) Jean-Julien Rojer	6	6
WC	(Thailand) Kovit Ratanaphet	4	2
(Thailand) Nutthanon Kadchapanan	6	6
(Thailand) Teeradon Tortrakul	1	2
(Thailand) Nattan Benjasupawan	4	0
7	(Japan) Yasutaka Uchiyama	6	6

Second round
2	(Japan) Yuichi Sugita	6	6
(Netherlands) Jean-Julien Rojer	2	3
(Thailand) Nutthanon Kadchapanan	4	3
7	(Japan) Yasutaka Uchiyama	6	6

Qualifying competition
2	(Japan) Yuichi Sugita	6	6
7	(Japan) Yasutaka Uchiyama	2	4

==== Third qualifier ====
First round
3	(Germany) Mischa Zverev	6	6
WC	(United States) Scott Lipsky	1	2
(Thailand) Kong Pop Lertchai	1	4
(Thailand) Pruchya Isaro	6	6
(Brazil) André Sá	6	4^{r}
(Thailand) Singekrawee Wattanakul	4	3
(Thailand) Warut Korkiatthaworn	3	4
5	(Chinese Taipei) Yang Tsung-hua	6	6

Second round
3	(Germany) Mischa Zverev	6	6
(Thailand) Pruchya Isaro	1	0
(Thailand) Singekrawee Wattanakul	3	4
5	(Chinese Taipei) Yang Tsung-hua	6	6

Qualifying competition
3	(Germany) Mischa Zverev	6	0	5
5	(Chinese Taipei) Yang Tsung-hua	4	6	7

==== Fourth qualifier ====
First round
4	(Japan) Hiroki Moriya	6	6
WC	(Thailand) Dane Chuntraruk	2	2
(Thailand) Chayanon Kaewsuto	4	4
(India) Vijay Sundar Prashanth	6	6
(Mexico) Santiago González	4	3
(Thailand) Kittipong Wachiramanowong	6	6
(Thailand) Grittaboon Prahmanee	6^{5}	6^{4}
8	(New Zealand) Daniel King-Turner	7^{7}	7^{7}

Second round
4	(Japan) Hiroki Moriya	6	6
(India) Vijay Sundar Prashanth	4	3
(Thailand) Kittipong Wachiramanowong	6	6
8	(New Zealand) Daniel King-Turner	4	4

Qualifying competition
4	(Japan) Hiroki Moriya	6	6
(Thailand) Kittipong Wachiramanowong	2	2
