= 2011 PTT Thailand Open – Singles =

Singles
- 2011 PTT Thailand Open

Final
- Champion: (United Kingdom) Andy Murray
- Runner-up: (United States) Donald Young
- Score: 6–2, 6–0

Details
- Draw: 28 (4 Q / 3 WC )
- Seeds: 8

Events
Singles	Doubles
← 2010 ·	PTT Thailand Open	· 2012 →

Guillermo García López was the defending champion, but was eliminated by eventual finalist Donald Young in the second round.

First seed, Andy Murray, claimed the title, beating Donald Young 6–2, 6–0 in the final.

== Seeds ==
The top four seeds received a bye into the second round.

1. (United Kingdom) Andy Murray (champion)
2. (France) Gaël Monfils (semifinals)
3. (France) Gilles Simon (semifinals)
4. (Spain) Guillermo García López (second round)
5. (Croatia) Ivan Dodig (first round)
6. (Italy) Fabio Fognini (first round)
7. (Netherlands) Robin Haase (second round)
8. (Spain) Pablo Andújar (first round)

== Draw ==
=== Key ===
- Q = Qualifier
- WC = Wild card
- LL = Lucky loser
- Alt = Alternate
- SE = Special exempt
- PR = Protected ranking
- ITF = ITF entry
- JE = Junior exempt
- w/o = Walkover
- r = Retired
- d = Defaulted
- SR = Special ranking

=== Finals ===
Semifinals
1	(United Kingdom) Andy Murray	6	3	6
3	(France) Gilles Simon	2	6	2
(United States) Donald Young	4	7^{7}	7^{7}
2	(France) Gaël Monfils	6	6^{5}	6^{5}

Final
1	(United Kingdom) Andy Murray	6	6
(United States) Donald Young	2	0

=== Top half ===
First round
(Germany) M Berrer	7^{7}	6
Q	(Switzerland) M Chiudinelli	6^{4}	3
Q	(Italy) S Bolelli	7	7
(Latvia) E Gulbis	6^{5}	6^{5}
(Bulgaria) G Dimitrov	6	7
5	(Croatia) I Dodig	2	5
(Chinese Taipei) Y-h Lu	6	7
(Brazil) J Souza	2	5
Q	(Australia) G Jones	5	4
(Germany) M Bachinger	7	6
WC	(Thailand) D Udomchoke	6	3	6
6	(Italy) F Fognini	4	6	2

Second round
1	(United Kingdom) A Murray	6	6
(Germany) M Berrer	4	2
Q	(Italy) S Bolelli	6^{8}	1
(Bulgaria) G Dimitrov	7^{10}	6
3	(France) G Simon	6^{4}	7	6
(Chinese Taipei) Y-h Lu	7^{7}	5	4
(Germany) M Bachinger	7^{7}	6
WC	(Thailand) D Udomchoke	6^{5}	3

Quarterfinals
1	(United Kingdom) A Murray	6	6
(Bulgaria) G Dimitrov	4	4
3	(France) G Simon	3	6	6
(Germany) M Bachinger	6	3	2

Semifinals
1	(United Kingdom) A Murray	6	3	6
3	(France) G Simon	2	6	2

=== Bottom half ===
First round
8	(Spain) P Andújar	0	1
(Germany) T Kamke	6	6
(Slovakia) K Beck	6	6^{0}	6^{4}
Q	(Japan) G Soeda	3	7^{7}	7^{7}
(Russia) I Andreev	6^{6}	1^{r}
(United States) D Young	7	2
7	(Netherlands) R Haase	6	7^{7}
WC	(Thailand) K Wachiramanowong	3	6^{1}
(Finland) J Nieminen	6	4	7
WC	(Austria) D Thiem	1	6	5
(Israel) D Sela	2	3
(Colombia) S Giraldo	6	6

Second round
(Germany) T Kamke	2	6^{7}
Q	(Japan) G Soeda	6	7^{9}
(United States) D Young	6	6^{0}	7
4	(Spain) G García López	1	7^{7}	5
7	(Netherlands) R Haase	6^{5}	6^{4}
(Finland) J Nieminen	7^{7}	7^{7}
(Colombia) S Giraldo	4	6	1
2	(France) G Monfils	6	4	6

Quarterfinals
Q	(Japan) G Soeda	1	2
(United States) D Young	6	6
(Finland) J Nieminen	5	6^{4}
2	(France) G Monfils	7	7^{7}

Semifinals
(United States) D Young	4	7^{7}	7^{7}
2	(France) G Monfils	6	6^{5}	6^{5}
