= 2011 PTT Thailand Open – Singles Qualifying =

This article displays the qualifying draw of the 2011 PTT Thailand Open.

== Players ==
=== Seeds ===
1. (Germany) Rainer Schüttler (qualifying competition)
2. (Japan) Go Soeda (qualified)
3. (Italy) Simone Bolelli (qualified)
4. (Ukraine) Illya Marchenko (qualifying competition)
5. (Israel) Amir Weintraub (qualifying competition)
6. (Australia) Greg Jones (qualified)
7. (Switzerland) Stéphane Bohli (qualifying competition)
8. (Switzerland) Marco Chiudinelli (qualified)

=== Qualifiers ===
1. (Australia) Greg Jones
2. (Japan) Go Soeda
3. (Italy) Simone Bolelli
4. (Switzerland) Marco Chiudinelli

== Qualifying draw ==
=== First qualifier ===
First Round				Second Round				Qualifying Competition
				1	(Germany) Rainer Schüttler	5
	(Thailand) Pongsiri Niroj	3	3		(Austria) Oliver Marach	1^{r}
	(Austria) Oliver Marach	6	6					1	(Germany) Rainer Schüttler	3	2
WC	(Thailand) Aviruth Phaphui	w/o						6	(Australia) Greg Jones	6	6
	(Canada) Kelsey Stevenson			WC	(Thailand) Aviruth Phaphui	1	3
				6	(Australia) Greg Jones	6	6

=== Second qualifier ===
First Round			Second Round				Qualifying Competition
			2	(Japan) Go Soeda	6	7
(Australia) Ashley Fisher	2	2		(New Zealand) Jose Statham	1	5
(New Zealand) Jose Statham	6	6					2	(Japan) Go Soeda	6	0	7
(Thailand) Weerapat Doakmaiklee							7	(Switzerland) Stéphane Bohli	4	6	5
(Russia) Evgeny Kirillov	w/o			(Russia) Evgeny Kirillov	3	4
			7	(Switzerland) Stéphane Bohli	6	6

=== Third qualifier ===
First Round
3	(Italy) Simone Bolelli	6	6
(Thailand) Warut Korkiatthaworn	2	2
(Thailand) Warit Sornbutnark	4	1
5	(Israel) Amir Weintraub	6	6

Qualifying Competition
3	(Italy) Simone Bolelli	6	6
5	(Israel) Amir Weintraub	4	2

=== Fourth qualifier ===
First Round					Second Round					Qualifying Competition
					4	(Ukraine) Illya Marchenko	6^{3}	6	6
WC	(Thailand) Dane Chuntraruk	w/o			WC	(Thailand) Dane Chuntraruk	7^{7}	3	3
WC	(Thailand) Wishaya Trongcharoenchaikul									4	(Ukraine) Illya Marchenko	6^{7}	0
	(Germany) Frank Moser	6	4	6						8	(Switzerland) Marco Chiudinelli	7^{9}	6
WC	(Thailand) Kong Pop Lertchai	1	6	4		(Germany) Frank Moser	1	1^{r}
					8	(Switzerland) Marco Chiudinelli	6	1
