= 2012 PTT Thailand Open =

Tennis tournament

- Date: 22–30 September
- Edition: 10th
- Category: ATP World Tour 250
- Draw: 28S / 16D
- Prize money: $551,000
- Surface: Hard / indoor
- Location: Bangkok, Thailand
- Venue: Impact Arena

Champions

Singles
- (France) Richard Gasquet

Doubles
- (Chinese Taipei) Lu Yen-hsun / (Thailand) Danai Udomchoke
← 2011 ·	PTT Thailand Open	· 2013 →

The 2012 PTT Thailand Open was a men's tennis tournament played on indoor hard courts. It was the 10th edition of the Thailand Open, and part of the ATP World Tour 250 Series of the 2012 ATP World Tour. It took place at the Impact Arena in Bangkok, Thailand, from 22 September through 30 September 2012. Richard Gasquet won the singles title.

== Singles main-draw entrants ==
=== Seeds ===
Country	Player	Rank*	Seed
SRB	Janko Tipsarević	9	1
FRA	Richard Gasquet	14	2
CAN	Milos Raonic	15	3
FRA	Gilles Simon	20	4
ESP	Fernando Verdasco	23	5
SRB	Viktor Troicki	31	6
FIN	Jarkko Nieminen	39	7
AUS	Bernard Tomic	42	8

* Seeds are based on the rankings of September 17, 2012

=== Other entrants ===
The following players received wildcards into the singles main draw:

- (Switzerland) Marco Chiudinelli
- (Thailand) Peerakiat Siriluethaiwattana
- (Thailand) Danai Udomchoke

The following players received entry from the qualifying draw:

- (South Africa) Kevin Anderson
- (Japan) Hiroki Moriya
- (Japan) Yūichi Sugita
- (Chinese Taipei) Yang Tsung-hua

=== Withdrawals ===
- (France) Jérémy Chardy
- (Slovenia) Blaž Kavčič
- (Kazakhstan) Mikhail Kukushkin

=== Retirements ===
- (Japan) Yūichi Sugita (right ankle injury)

== Doubles main-draw entrants ==
=== Seeds ===
Country	Player	Country	Player	Rank^{1}	Seed
IND	Leander Paes	ROU	Horia Tecău	11	1
MEX	Santiago González	USA	Scott Lipsky	56	2
ESP	David Marrero	ESP	Fernando Verdasco	58	3
USA	Eric Butorac	AUS	Paul Hanley	74	4

- Rankings are as of September 17, 2012

=== Other entrants ===
The following pairs received wildcards into the doubles main draw:

- (Thailand) Sanchai Ratiwatana / (Thailand) Sonchat Ratiwatana
- (Chinese Taipei) Lu Yen-hsun / (Thailand) Danai Udomchoke

== Finals ==
=== Singles ===
(France) Richard Gasquet defeated (France) Gilles Simon, 6–2, 6–1

=== Doubles ===
(Chinese Taipei) Lu Yen-hsun / (Thailand) Danai Udomchoke defeated (United States) Eric Butorac / (Australia) Paul Hanley, 6–3, 6–4
