= Grigor Dimitrov =

Bulgarian tennis player (born 1991)

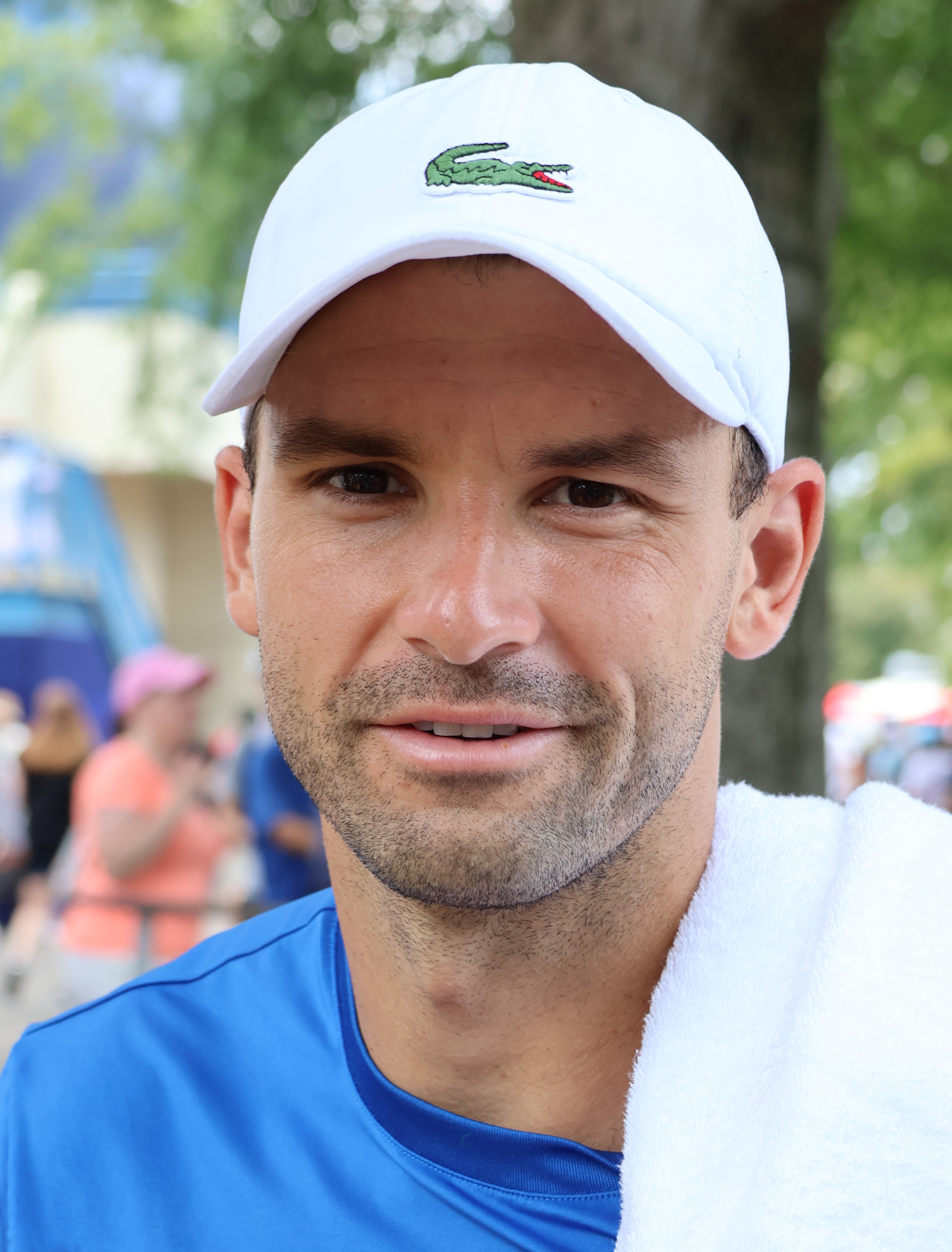
- Dimitrov in 2023 Washington Open
- Native name: Григор Димитров Димитров
- Country (sports): Bulgaria
- Residence: Monte Carlo, Monaco
- Born: 16 May 1991 (age 35) Haskovo, Bulgaria
- Height: 1.91 m (6 ft 3 in)
- Turned pro: May 2007
- Plays: Right (one-handed backhand)
- Coach: David Nalbandian (2026-),Jamie Delgado (2022-Sep 2025, May 2026-); Daniel Vallverdu (2016-2019, 2022-2025), Xavier Malisse (Nov 2025-Apr 2026)
- Prize money: US $33,722,316: 15th all-time in earnings

Singles
- Career record: 485–313 (60.8%)
- Career titles: 9
- Highest ranking: No. 3 (20 November 2017)
- Current ranking: No. 135 (9 November 2026)

Grand Slam singles results
- Australian Open: SF (2017)
- French Open: QF (2024)
- Wimbledon: SF (2014)
- US Open: SF (2019)

Other tournaments
- Tour Finals: W (2017)
- Olympic Games: 2R (2012)

Doubles
- Career record: 57–80
- Career titles: 0
- Highest ranking: No. 66 (26 August 2013)

Grand Slam doubles results
- Australian Open: 3R (2013)
- French Open: 2R (2013)
- Wimbledon: 2R (2011, 2013)
- US Open: 1R (2011)

Mixed doubles
- Career record: 3–1

Grand Slam mixed doubles results
- French Open: 1R (2011)

Team competitions
- Davis Cup: 20–4
- Hopman Cup: RR (2012)
- Last updated on: 30 November 2026.

Grigor Dimitrov Dimitrov (Bulgarian: Григор Димитров Димитров, pronounced [ɡriˈɡɔr dimiˈtrɔf]; born 16 May 1991) is a Bulgarian professional tennis player. He has been ranked as high as world No. 3 in singles by the ATP, making him the highest-ranked Bulgarian in history. Dimitrov reached the ranking after winning the biggest title of his career at the season-ending ATP Finals in November 2017. He has won nine ATP Tour singles titles including a Masters 1000 in Cincinnati.

Prior to his professional career, Dimitrov enjoyed a successful junior career, in which he reached the world No. 1 ranking and won consecutive major boys' singles titles at the 2008 Wimbledon Championships and the 2008 US Open. In October 2013 at the Stockholm Open, Dimitrov became the first Bulgarian man to win an ATP Tour singles title. By reaching the 2024 French Open quarterfinals, Dimitrov became the second player born in the 1990s (after Daniil Medvedev), to complete the career set of both Grand Slam and Masters 1000 quarterfinals. He holds the Open Era record for most Grand Slam retirements (10), including a record 5 times consecutively. As of 2025 Wimbledon, he was the male player with the longest active and fifth-longest overall streak of consecutive Grand Slam appearances, at 58, which ended when he withdrew from the 2025 US Open.

Dimitrov was named Bulgarian Sportsperson of the Year in 2014 and 2017, marking the first and second occasions a tennis player received the honor since the award's inception in 1958. In 2017, he was also awarded the Balkan Athlete of the Year. In December 2024, he was selected the winner of the Stefan Edberg Sportsmanship Award.

== Early life ==
Grigor Dimitrov was born on 16 May 1991, in Haskovo to father Dimitar Dimitrov, a volleyball champion and tennis coach, and mother Maria Dimitrova, a sports teacher and former volleyball player, in 1991. He first held a tennis racket, given to him by his mother, at the age of three, and when he was five he began to play daily. In his early years his father served as his coach, but after he proved his talent in the tournaments for juniors, he made it clear that he would have to develop in other conditions. At the age of 16, Dimitrov turned professional.

In 2007, Dimitrov joined the academy "Sanchez-Casal", where he was further trained under the leadership of Emilio Sánchez and Pato Álvarez. Since March 2009 Dimitrov trained in Paris, France, where he joined Patrick Mouratoglou's tennis academy and spent the next four seasons there and he appointed Patrick Mouratoglou as coach for 2012.

== Personal life ==
Dimitrov began dating Maria Sharapova in late 2012. He and Sharapova only confirmed their relationship after the 2013 Madrid Open where the Bulgarian managed his first win against a world No. 1, beating Novak Djokovic. Sharapova and Dimitrov separated in July 2015. At the end of 2015, he started discreetly dating American singer Nicole Scherzinger, the lead vocalist of The Pussycat Dolls. Their romantic relationship ended in 2019. Since then, he has been involved in relationships with businesswoman Lolita Osmanova, president of the Luxury International magazine, as well as Romanian actress Mădălina Ghenea. Since April 2025, Dimitrov is in a relationship with Mexican actress Eiza González, confirmed through an Instagram post.

In addition to his native Bulgarian, he speaks English and says his main interests are sports, cars, computers and watches. Early in his career he was given the nickname "Baby Fed" for his stylish play and on-court talent being similar to that of Roger Federer.

Dimitrov's cousin, Alexander Vasilev, is also a tennis player competing on the ITF World Tennis Tour Juniors; he has reached a career-high ITF boys’ ranking of No. 2.

== Junior career ==
He claimed his first major junior cup, the U14 European title, at the age of 14. In 2006, he won the Orange Bowl U16 boys singles and was later named the Eddie Herr International 2007 Rising Star.

In 2007, Dimitrov was the finalist at the Orange Bowl U18 boys singles losing to Ričardas Berankis of Lithuania. With Vasek Pospisil, he reached the US Open doubles final falling to Jonathan Eysseric and Jérôme Inzerillo.

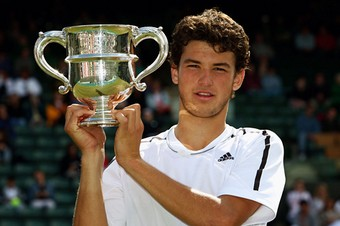
Dimitrov as junior Wimbledon champion for 2008

He began the 2008 Grand Slam season with a quarterfinal showing at the French Open, losing to Poland's Jerzy Janowicz in three sets. However he went on to win Wimbledon after defeating Henri Kontinen of Finland in the final. He won the title without dropping a set despite playing with a shoulder injury throughout the tournament. The victory saw him join former junior champions Roger Federer and Stefan Edberg and guaranteed him a wildcard entry into the 2009 Wimbledon men's draw. His success continued at the US Open, which he won on 7 September, defeating American qualifier Devin Britton in two sets. On his way to the title he also defeated top seed Yang Tsung-hua of Taiwan in the semifinals. After the tournament Dimitrov announced that he was ending his junior career and focusing on improving his ATP ranking. On 8 September 2008, he became junior world No. 1 overtaking Yang Tsung-hua. He closed at No. 3 of the junior ranking that year. Dimitrov compiled a singles win–loss record of 74–28 as a junior (and 42–20 in doubles).

Junior Grand Slam performance – Singles:

Australian Open: A (-)
French Open: QF (2008)
Wimbledon: W (2008)
US Open: W (2008)

== Professional career ==
=== 2008: ATP Tour debut ===
In 2008, Dimitrov began frequent participation in men's events. His first title came on clay at a futures tournament in Barcelona. His first ATP level match was at the Rosmalen Open where he lost to Igor Andreev in straight sets. After his junior US Open title he won back to back futures tournaments in Madrid on hardcourt and rose 300 places to career high ranking of 477. The achievement attracted enough attention to earn him a wildcard into the Madrid Open qualifying draw where he lost to then-No. 64, Florent Serra of France. After being granted another wildcard to the Swiss Indoors qualifying draw, he defeated No. 122, Jiří Vaněk, in three sets in the first round for his first ATP level win, before losing to Julian Reister.

=== 2009: First ATP win, Grand Slam debut ===
In 2009, he was granted a wildcard to the main draw of the Rotterdam Open and scored an upset over then-world No. 23, Tomáš Berdych, earning his first ATP Tour main-draw win. In the second round, he faced world No. 1, Rafael Nadal, and lost in three sets.

He was granted a wildcard to the main draw of the Open 13 in Marseille but lost to world No. 8, Gilles Simon, in the first round, despite serving for the match at ninth game of the third set. He then completed two victories in the Davis Cup against Hungary. He lost to Danai Udomchoke in straight sets in the second round of the Bangkok Open. Four first-round exits in Challengers followed. He then reached the quarterfinals after qualifying of two successive Challengers at the Trofeo Paolo Corazzi and Nottingham Trophy. He reached the second round of the Queen's Club Championships after defeating Iván Navarro, but lost in two tiebreaks to Gilles Simon.

On his Grand Slam debut at the Wimbledon where he got a wildcard as the 2008 juniors champion, he won the first set of his first-round match against Igor Kunitsyn but then suffered a knee injury. Despite this he attempted to continue but lost the following ten games before he retired.

He was granted a wildcard to the main draw of the Swedish Open but lost in the first round to Guillermo Cañas. He reached the quarterfinals of the Challenger Open Castilla y León losing out in three sets to Marcel Granollers. He then lost in the second round to Martin Fischer in straight sets at the Istanbul Challenger. As the 2008 winner of the US Open boys tournament he was granted a wildcard for the US Open qualification tournament. He won his first-round match against Tobias Kamke but in the second round lost to the top seed of the qualifying, Thomaz Bellucci. Dimitrov won his first doubles Challenger title at the ATP Challenger Trophy with Teymuraz Gabashvili beating Jan Minář and Lukáš Rosol. He then received a wildcard at the Stockholm Open but lost in the first round to Jarkko Nieminen.

=== 2010: Top 250 debut, first Challenger title ===
Dimitrov started the season with a quarterfinal finish at a Challenger event of Internationaux de Nouvelle-Calédonie. He then attempted to qualify for the Australian Open, but lost in the first round to Robert Kendrick in three sets.

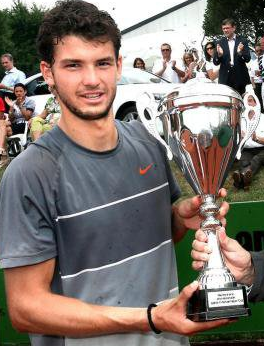
Dimitrov in 2010

He bounced back a week later by qualifying at the Honolulu Challenger, but lost to Donald Young in the second round. Dimitrov then participated for Bulgaria in the Davis Cup, claiming all three wins in a 3–2 victory over Monaco. Following the Davis Cup tie, Dimitrov had a number of early losses in various Challenger tournaments. Dimitrov won his first ATP Tour match of the year on the grass courts of the Queen's Club in London. He beat Alex Bogdanovic before losing to world No. 31, Feliciano López, in the second round. He then had a great run in the Marburg Open, a Challenger event, where he came through qualifying to reach the semifinals where he lost out to Simone Vagnozzi. Dimitrov again had a number of disappointing losses in Challenger events and another Davis Cup tie. Dimitrov then participated in four futures tournaments, posting impressive results, including two tournament victories in Germany, and another in Spain. Dimitrov gained enough points to enter the world's top 250 for the first time in his career.

His good form translated to the Challenger Tour, capturing three consecutive titles, the first coming at the Geneva Open Challenger, defeating Pablo Andújar in three sets. And back to back titles at the Bangkok Open, where he beat former top 20 player Dmitry Tursunov in the quarterfinals and Konstantin Kravchuk in the final, and at the Bangkok Open 2 defeating Alexander Kudryavtsev. He made an early exit in his first Challenger after a two-week break but bounced back a week later, beating top 100 player Lukáš Lacko and world No. 32 Michaël Llodra on the way to the final of the Open d'Orléans. In the final, Dimitrov lost to Nicolas Mahut in a third set tiebreak. After two disappointing Challenger tournaments in Germany, in which Dimitrov suffered first round exits, he reached the semifinals of IPP Open in Helsinki, his last tournament of the year. There he played Lithuanian youngster Ričardas Berankis. After the loss of a tight first set in a tiebreak, Dimitrov dominated the second set but was dominated in turn by Berankis in a third set loss. In an off-court incident after the match, Dimitrov pushed the chair umpire with both hands and swore at him because he felt he was treated unfairly after some close calls in the first set tiebreak. Dimitrov was fined €2,000. By reaching the semifinals in Helsinki, Dimitrov reached his best ever ATP World ranking of No. 106.

=== 2011: Top 100 ===
His first tournament of the year was the Australian Open where he advanced through the qualifying rounds with the loss of just one set. He defeated world No. 38, Andrey Golubev, to advance for the first time to the second round of a Grand Slam tournament where he lost to 19th seed Stanislas Wawrinka. Nonetheless, Dimitrov achieved his top ever ATP ranking ending January at World No. 85. Thus, he became the top ranked Bulgarian male tennis player of all time.

Dimitrov then qualified for the Rotterdam Open but lost to eighth seed Jo-Wilfried Tsonga in the first round in two sets. He then lost in the first rounds of the Marseille Open and Dubai Tennis Championships to Dmitry Tursunov and Richard Gasquet, respectively. Dimitrov then won the Challenger de Cherbourg defeating defending champion and second seed Nicolas Mahut in the final.

He then qualified for the Miami Open losing to Sergiy Stakhovsky. Dimitrov became the first Bulgarian man ever to be seeded at an ATP World Tour tournament being seeded eighth at the U.S. Clay Court Championships but lost in the second round to Teymuraz Gabashvili. At the Barcelona Open, he lost in the first round to Juan Mónaco. He had reached his first quarterfinal in an ATP tournament at the BMW Open, after defeating Marcos Baghdatis but then lost to Florian Mayer in three sets. Dimitrov lost in the first round of the French Open to Jérémy Chardy.

Dimitrov then advanced to his second ATP quarterfinals at the Eastbourne International after he defeated sixth seeded Kevin Anderson in the second round, but lost in the third round to third seed Janko Tipsarević. He also competed in the doubles with Andreas Seppi and became the first Bulgarian man ever to reach a doubles final at an ATP tournament, they lost to Jonathan Erlich and Andy Ram. At Wimbledon, he lost a memorable second round match to Jo-Wilfried Tsonga, in a tight four-setter. He then reached the second rounds of the Hall of Fame Tennis Championships and Farmers Classic, losing to Americans Denis Kudla and Alex Bogomolov Jr. At the Atlanta Tennis Championships, he fell to Rajeev Ram in the first round. At the Western & Southern Open Dimitrov defeated Marsel İlhan in the first round, but lost to world No. 6, David Ferrer, in the second round in three sets. He also played in the third round of the Winston-Salem Open being defeated by Alexandr Dolgopolov in a third set tie-break. At the US Open, Dimitrov was defeated by Gaël Monfils in the first round. At the Open de Moselle, Dimitrov was beaten in 53 minutes by qualifier Igor Sijsling in the first round. After that, in the Thailand Open, Dimitrov beat Ivan Dodig and Simone Bolelli, before falling to Andy Murray in the quarterfinals in two sets.

In his next tournament, at the China Open, he lost once again to top-seeded Jo-Wilfried Tsonga in the first round. At Shanghai Masters Dimitrov beat Marsel İlhan in the first round but was defeated by Andy Roddick in the second round in two tight sets. At the Stockholm Open Dimitrov beat Ryan Sweeting and Juan Ignacio Chela before losing to Milos Raonic in the quarterfinals. He ended the year ranked No. 76.

=== 2012: First top 10 win, top 50 year-end ===
Dimitrov started his 2012 season by competing at the Hopman Cup alongside Tsvetana Pironkova. Their team was defeated by the Czech Republic 1–2, after they won a match in mixed doubles but lost their singles matches. Then, their team defeated Denmark 2–1. Against USA, Dimitrov dispatched Mardy Fish in straight sets in his first win (although not official ATP win) against a top 10 player.

At the Australian Open, Dimitrov defeated Jérémy Chardy to reach the second round but then he lost in five sets to Nicolás Almagro. Dimitrov competed in the Pacific Coast Championships but lost in the first round to Kevin Anderson, despite winning the first set easily, lost the next two in tie-breaks.

At Indian Wells, Dimitrov defeated Ivan Dodig in the first round, but lost to David Ferrer in the second round. Dimitrov's next tournament was the Miami Open where he reached the fourth round, after defeating Mikhail Kukushkin, Juan Ignacio Chela, and upsetting world No. 7, Tomáš Berdych, his first win over a top-ten player, before losing to Janko Tipsarević. Dimitrov entered the Challenger event Prague Open as the fifth seeded player. In the first round he defeated Jan Hájek and then lost to Aljaž Bedene in the second. At the French Open, Dimitrov was a set and a break up against 17th seed Richard Gasquet before a 38 shot rally left Dimitrov cramping up and Gasquet vomiting, and caused Dimitrov to lose momentum, the set, and eventually the match.

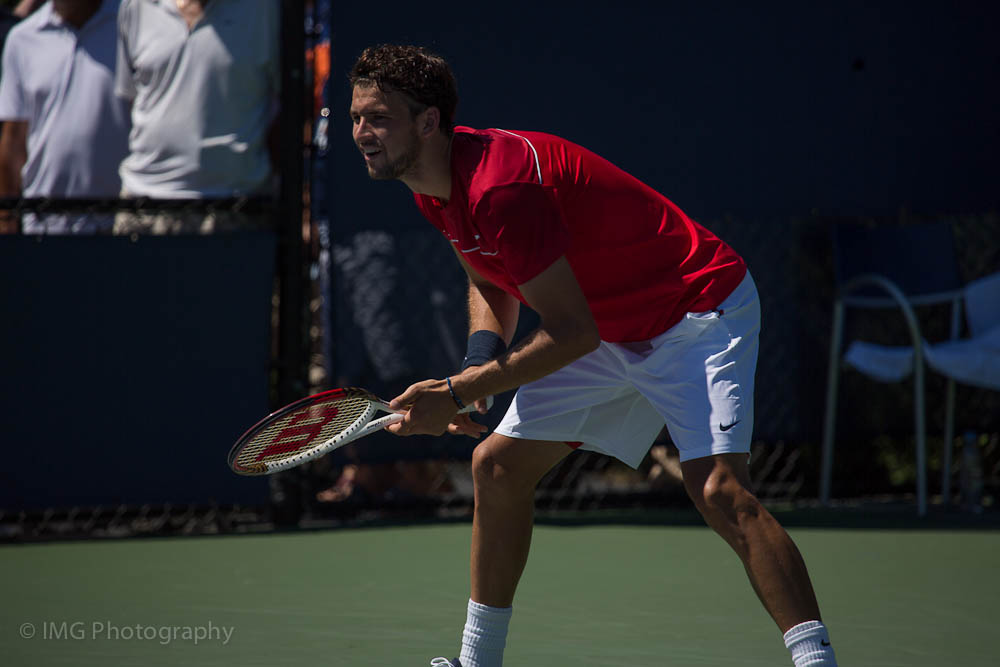
Dimitrov at the 2012 US Open

Dimitrov's next tournament was the Birmingham Championships. He beat Bobby Reynolds, Gilles Müller and Nicolas Mahut and then reached his first ATP semifinal by beating the No. 9 seed, Kevin Anderson by coming back from a set down. Dimitrov became the first ever Bulgarian male tennis player to reach an ATP semifinal. In his first ATP semifinal, Dimitrov lost to tenth seeded David Nalbandian in straight sets. This tournament helped him become No. 65 in the rankings.

At the 2012 Wimbledon Championships, Dimitrov faced the No. 32 seed, Kevin Anderson in the first round. Dimitrov won in a very close four sets. In the second round, he faced the Cypriot Marcos Baghdatis, where Dimitrov retired due to an injury. His next tournament was Swedish Open. Seeded sixth, he eliminated Rogério Dutra da Silva, Frederico Gil, and third seed Albert Ramos all in straight sets to reach a second ATP semifinal in his career. In the semifinal, he lost to the top seed and eventual champion David Ferrer in straight sets. Dimitrov then competed in the Suisse Open Gstaad. He defeated sixth seed Julien Benneteau, Dustin Brown, and Łukasz Kubot. In his third career semifinal, he lost again – this time to Thomaz Bellucci in two tough tiebreaks.

On the grass of Wimbledon, Dimitrov represented his country for the first time in the Olympics. In the first round, he defeated Pole Łukasz Kubot again in two tight sets, two weeks after he had beaten him in the Swiss Open quarterfinal. He fell in the second round to the 12th seed, Gilles Simon – his fourth loss against Simon (whom he has never beaten).

On hardcourts, Dimitrov has failed to qualify for Rogers Cup and Western & Southern Open. In both Masters tournaments, he lost in the first round of the qualifying round to Marco Chiudinelli and Rajeev Ram respectively. Dimitrov suffered a first lost at the final slam of the year, the US Open to Benoît Paire in four sets. He ended his drought at the Thailand Open, reaching the second round before losing to Richard Gasquet in three tight sets. He then qualified for the Japan Open, but fell to Juan Mónaco in straight sets.

At the Masters event of Shanghai, he defeated Pablo Andújar before losing to world No. 2 Novak Djokovic. At the Swiss Indoors Basel Dimitrov reached the quarterfinals, defeating Viktor Troicki in straight sets and Julien Benneteau in three tie-break sets, before losing to Paul-Henri Mathieu in two tie-break sets. His next tournament was the Paris Masters, after receiving an entry from the qualifying draw. He beat Jürgen Melzer before his 2012 campaign ended at the hands of Juan Mónaco. Dimitrov ended 2012 ranked world No. 48 in singles.

=== 2013: First ATP title and Masters quarterfinal ===
Dimitrov began his 2013 season by competing at the Brisbane International. He defeated Brian Baker, world No. 13 Milos Raonic, Jürgen Melzer, and Marcos Baghdatis to reach his first ATP singles final, thus becoming the first Bulgarian player to reach an ATP final. He lost to world No. 3 and defending champion Andy Murray in straight sets, despite being a break up in both sets. Dimitrov paired Kei Nishikori in the doubles and reached the semifinals, but withdrew due to Nishikori's injury. This performance also meant that Dimitrov surpassed $1 million earned in prize money, a feat which no other male Bulgarian tennis player has accomplished. In his next event, the Sydney International, Dimitrov suffered a first-round straight-set loss to Italian Fabio Fognini.

At the Australian Open, Dimitrov suffered a first-round straight-set defeat by Julien Benneteau. He also competed in the men's doubles event with Marcos Baghdatis. The pair defeated fourth seeds Max Mirnyi and Horia Tecău in the second round, before losing to Juan Sebastián Cabal and Robert Farah Maksoud in the third round in two close tie-break sets. Despite losing in the first round, Dimitrov became the first male Bulgarian player to rank inside the top 40 after the event. He then competed for Bulgaria in the Davis Cup against Finland, and won both his singles matches against Juho Paukku and Micke Kontinen, but lost his doubles in five sets (with partner Dimitar Kuzmanov) against Henri Kontinen of Finland and Harri Heliövaara. Finland ended up winning the tie 3–2.

At the Zagreb Indoors, Dimitrov lost in the first round to Ivo Karlović in two tie-breaks. At the Rotterdam Open, Dimitrov beat Bernard Tomic and Nikolai Davydenko, and Marcos Baghdatis in three sets. In the semifinals, Dimitrov lost against world No. 7 and eventual champion, Juan Martín del Potro, in straight sets. At the Indian Wells Open, Dimitrov became the first Bulgarian male tennis player to be seeded in a Masters 1000 event. In singles, he beat Matthew Ebden in two sets, but lost to world No. 1 Novak Djokovic in the third round. In doubles he partnered with Frederik Nielsen; they lost to Ivan Dodig and Marcelo Melo in the second round. At the Miami Open, Dimitrov beat Simone Bolelli, but lost to second seed Andy Murray in straight sets in the following round. In doubles with partner Frederik Nielsen, they reached semi-finals losing in straight sets against the eighth seeds, Mariusz Fyrstenberg and Marcin Matkowski.

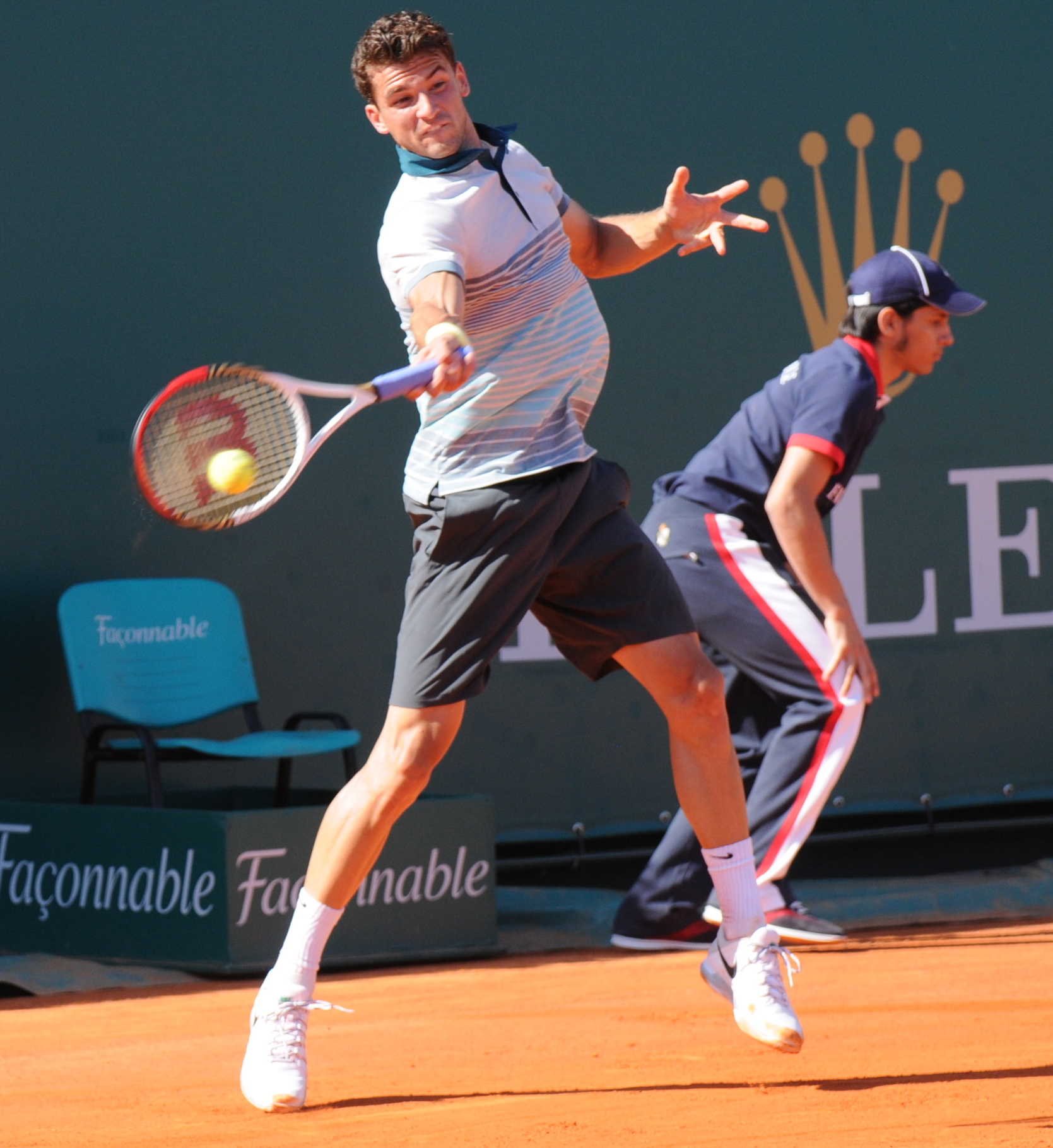
Dimitrov at the 2013 Monte-Carlo Masters

Dimitrov's next tournament was the clay-court Monte-Carlo Masters, where he reached his first quarterfinal at this level beating Xavier Malisse, eighth seed Janko Tipsarević, and Florian Mayer, all in straight sets, but lost in three sets to eight-time defending champion and third seed Rafael Nadal. This good run in Monte Carlo meant Dimitrov entered the top 30 in the ATP rankings for the first time, at No. 28. His next event was Barcelona Open, seeded 14th, he received a bye, but lost in the second round, despite leading 5–2 in the first set, he lost in straight sets to in-form Tommy Robredo.

At the Madrid Open, following a victory over fellow 21-year-old Javier Martí, Dimitrov recorded the biggest win of his career, defeating world No. 1, Novak Djokovic in a three set match, in just over three hours. The two had met twice before, with Djokovic taking both encounters. In the third round, despite winning the first set, he lost in three sets to 15th seed Stan Wawrinka.

Dimitrov's next event was at the Internazionali d'Italia. In what was his fourth victory over the Cypriot out of five matches, he beat Marcos Baghdatis in straight sets in the first round, with one break of serve deciding both sets. In the second round he lost in straight sets against ninth seed and world No. 9 Richard Gasquet – his fourth loss against the Frenchman out of four matches.

At the French Open, Dimitrov was seeded 26th, thus becoming the first ever Bulgarian male tennis player to be seeded at a Grand Slam tournament. He beat Alejandro Falla in the first round, after the Colombian retired trailing one set to love and one game down in the second set, citing an elbow problem. Dimitrov eliminated wildcard world No. 324, Lucas Pouille, in straight sets in the second round, thus becoming the first ever Bulgarian male tennis player to reach the third round of a Grand Slam. He lost in straight sets against world No. 1, Novak Djokovic, in the third round. Dimitrov also played in the doubles with partner Frederik Nielsen losing in straight sets to seventh seeded Alexander Peya and Bruno Soares in the second round.

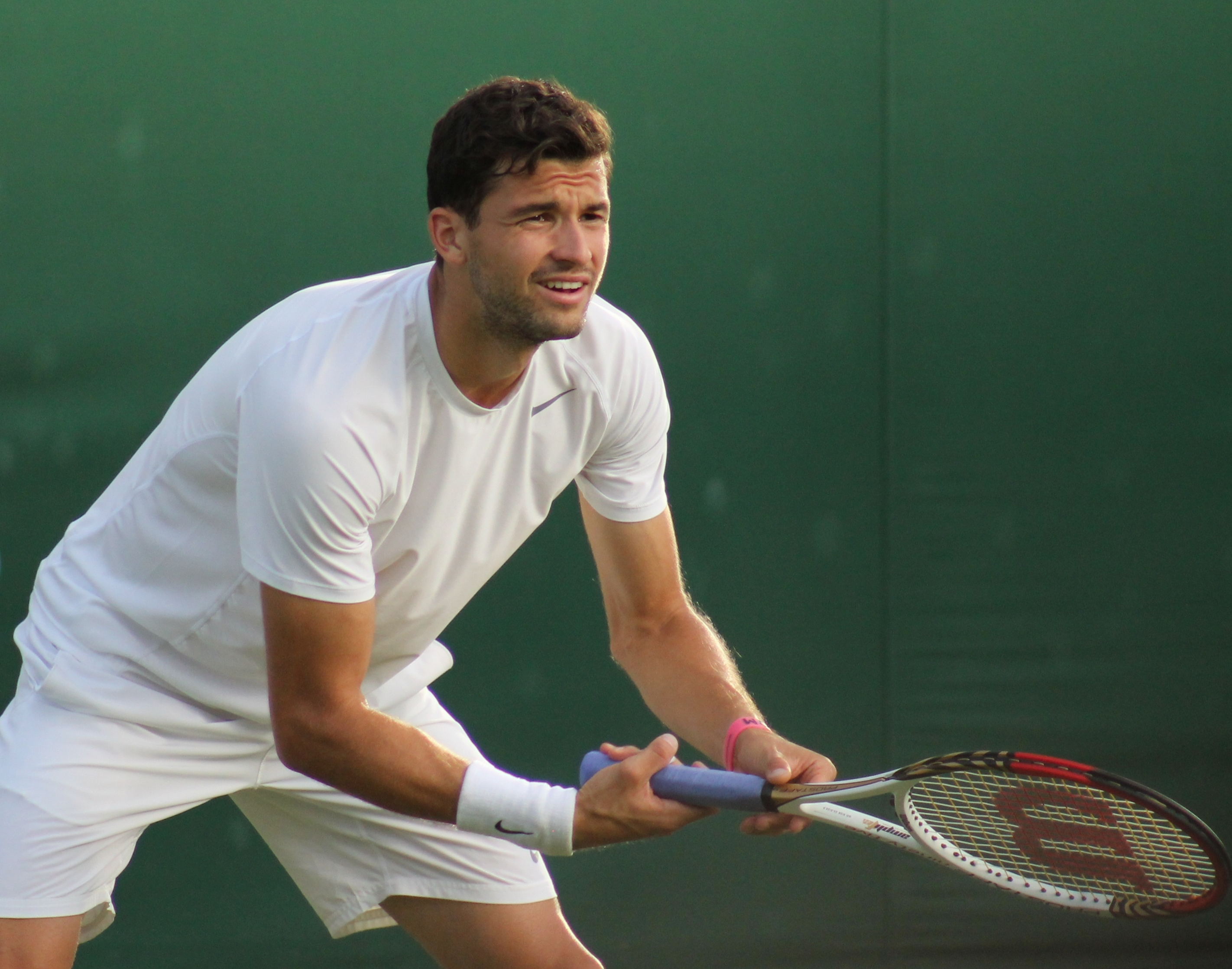
Dimitrov at Wimbledon, 2013

In the grass season, Dimitrov played the Birmingham Championships, where he was seeded tenth. He faced Dudi Sela in the first round, he came back from a set down and won the third set in a tie-break, but lost to four-time champion Lleyton Hewitt in the second round in straight sets. He then played the Boodles Challenge, an exhibition event, he lost to Janko Tipsarević and Novak Djokovic on a match tie-break, but defeated Jerzy Janowicz in straight sets. At the Wimbledon Championships, Dimitrov eliminated Simone Bolelli in straight sets and then lost in the second round to world No. 55, Grega Žemlja, 11–9 in the fifth set.

At Swedish Open, Dimitrov reached semifinals for his second consecutive year. He eliminated Elias Ymer and Filippo Volandri in three sets, and upset world No. 20, Juan Mónaco, in the quarterfinals, in straight sets. In the semifinals he lost to Fernando Verdasco, in an epic three set battle. He then started his US Open Series campaign at the Washington Open, Dimitrov received a bye and defeated Xavier Malisse and Sam Querrey in straight sets. In the quarterfinals, Dimitrov lost in two tiebreak sets to the German veteran Tommy Haas. At the Rogers Cup, he fell in the first round the Spaniard Marcel Granollers in straight sets, but rebounded at the Western & Southern Open, defeating world No. 15 Nicolás Almagro and Brian Baker, before losing to Rafael Nadal in three sets in the third round. The Bulgarian then suffered three consecutive first round exits at the US Open to João Sousa in five sets, the China Open to Roberto Bautista Agut in straight set, and the Shanghai Masters to Kei Nishikori in straight sets as well.

At the Stockholm Open Dimitrov won his first ATP title by defeating top seed David Ferrer in the final, coming back from a set down, becoming the first ever male Bulgarian player in the Open era to win such a title. This win also meant Dimitrov reached a career-best No. 22 in the world. He followed it up with a quarterfinal showing at the Swiss Indoors defeating Radek Štěpánek and Alexandr Dolgopolov in straight sets, before losing to childhood idol Roger Federer in two tight sets. He played his final event of the year at the Paris Masters, where he beat Michaël Llodra and Fabio Fognini, both in three sets, but then lost to Juan Martín del Potro in the third round, despite winning the first set. Dimitrov finished the year ranked 23rd in singles and 68th in doubles.

On 16 December 2013, Dimitrov received the second most votes for the Bulgarian Sportsperson of the Year award, earning 1331 points and finishing just behind wrestler Ivo Angelov.

=== 2014: Three titles on three surfaces, Wimbledon semifinal, top 10 ===
Dimitrov started the 2014 season ranked 23rd. His first event was the Brisbane International, where he took part in the last event too and reached his first final at that time. He was now seeded fifth. However, now he was unable to repeat that good performance, winning in the first round in two sets against Robin Haase in under one hour, but then losing against Marin Čilić in two sets, losing both sets to five games with a break of his serve in the last game deciding both sets. He also competed in the doubles with partner Jérémy Chardy and won in the first round against Brits Fleming and Hutchins (winning the deciding champion tiebreak), but then lost in the second round against Federer and Mahut in a match which featured three tiebreaks, with a champion tiebreak again deciding the match. Dimitrov then played at the exhibition tournament in Kooyong, Australia, an event which featured top players Richard Gasquet, Stan Wawrinka and Tomáš Berdych. However he failed to take a single victory (losing in straight sets to Kei Nishikori and Fernando Verdasco), and ultimately pulled out prior to the seventh place playoff.

Seeded 22nd at the Australian Open, Dimitrov had his best run at a major event, defeating Bradley Klahn, Lu Yen-hsun, eleventh seed Milos Raonic and Roberto Bautista Agut in succession, leading him to his first ever major quarterfinal, where he lost to top seed and world No. 1 Rafael Nadal in four sets, after winning the first and also having three set points to win the third. As a result of this career-best run at a Grand Slam tournament, Dimitrov entered the world's top 20 for the first time (at No. 19), becoming the first ever Bulgarian male tennis player to do so.

Next, in February, he played at the Rotterdam indoor event, where he was seeded eighth. Dimitrov beat world No. 28 Dmitry Tursunov in the first round 2–1 sets. Dimitrov then lost to world No. 24, Ernests Gulbis, in straight sets.

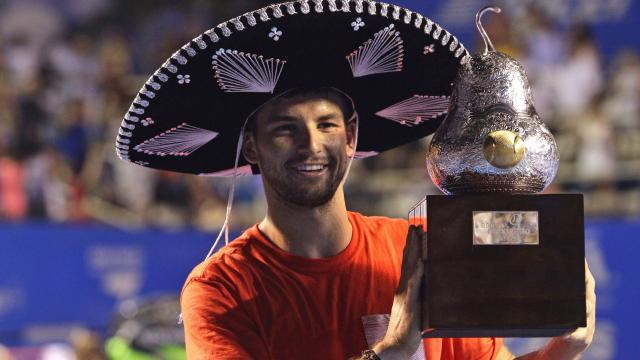
Dimitrov with the trophy at the Acapulco event

Dimitrov played in the Acapulco hard court event, where he was seeded 4th. Dimitrov beat world No. 71, Marinko Matosevic, in the first round and Marcos Baghdatis in the second in straight sets. In the quarterfinals, Dimitrov beat seventh seed and world No. 18, Ernests Gulbis, in two sets to one in a match lasting over 2½ hours. In the semifinals Dimitrov beat second seed and world No. 7, Andy Murray, for the first time in a match that lasted almost three hours – losing the first set then overcoming the Brit in two tiebreaks; thus, reaching his third ATP final where he defeated Kevin Anderson, in three sets. The victory was Dimitrov's first win at an ATP 500 level tournament and with it he reached his highest ever ATP rank – No. 16. Following his win, Dimitrov played at the Indian Wells Masters, an ATP 1000 event, where he was seeded 15th and received a bye into the second round where he beat Robin Haase in straight sets, but then lost in the third round in two sets to one to world No. 22, Ernests Gulbis, who reached the quarterfinal.

Dimitrov then played in Miami, where he was again seeded 15th and had a bye in the first round. He beat Albert Montañés 2–1 sets (losing the second set on a tiebreak) in round two. In the third round, in what was his second loss against the Japanese out of two matches between them, he lost in a tight two sets to 20th seed Kei Nishikori, who went on to reach the semifinals. After Miami, Dimitrov reached a new career-high ranking of No. 15.

In April, he played for the Bulgarian Davis Cup team in the Europe Group II playoffs between Greece and Bulgaria. In the opening match of the tie, he beat No. 690 teenager Markos Kalovelonis 3–0 sets, losing just six games. He then teamed up with No. 344 Dimitar Kutrovsky, who previously brought a second win for Bulgaria, and they beat the Greek team of Alexandros Jakupovic and Markos Kalovelonis 3–0 sets, thus bringing the tie to a crucial 3–0 lead, meaning Bulgaria keeps their Europe Group II position for 2015 and Greece gets relegated to Europe Group III.

Just before Monte Carlo, Dimitrov reached a new career-high ranking of No. 14. At the Monte-Carlo Masters clay-court event, he was seeded 12th. Dimitrov beat in-form No. 32 Marcel Granollers 2–1 sets in the 1st round, then another Spaniard – qualifier Albert Ramos, ranked just outside the top-100, also 2–1 sets. However, in what was his fourth loss out of five matches between them, Dimitrov lost 2–0 sets to sixth seed David Ferrer in round three.

He then played in the Bucharest clay-court event, where he was given a wildcard and was the top seed and had a bye in the first round. In what was the first meeting between the two, in round two Dimitrov beat No. 79 Jiří Veselý 2–0 sets. He beat Sergiy Stakhovsky 2–0 sets in round three, then beat third seed No. 24 Gaël Monfils in the semifinals after leading in the first set when Monfils retired, thus reaching his fourth ATP final. In the final, Dimitrov defeated Lukáš Rosol 2–0 sets, winning the first on a tie-break, then winning the second set with the loss of just one game to win his third ATP title and first one on clay.

In May, he played in the Madrid Open clay-court event, where he was seeded 12th. Dimitrov beat local wildcard Pablo Carreño Busta 2–0 sets in the first round, then in the second round another wildcard – No. 164 Marius Copil – 2–1 sets, coming back from a set down, winning the deciding set on a tie-break. However, in what was his first loss against the Czech out of three matches between them, in round three he lost 2–1 sets to sixth seed No. 6, Tomáš Berdych, after winning the first set.

Dimitrov then played at the Italian Open, where he was again seeded 12th. He beat No. 47 Édouard Roger-Vasselin 2–1 sets, No. 52 Ivo Karlović 2–0 sets, then sixth seed, Tomáš Berdych, 2–1 for a third victory against the Czech out of four matches between them, then 15th seed Tommy Haas in the quarterfinals, after the German retired while losing 1–0 in sets. In what was the fifth match between them and the first match that Dimitrov was unable to win a set in, he lost 2–0 sets to first seed, Rafael Nadal, in the semifinals. This reaching of the Rome semifinal was Dimitrov's best ATP Masters performance. He also successfully played in the Rome doubles with partner Lukáš Rosol and they beat unseeded world No. 4 Colombian pair Juan Sebastián Cabal and Robert Farah Maksoud in the first round 2–0 sets, winning both sets on a tie-break. In the second and third rounds, they beat second seeded Austrian-Brazilian duo of Alexander Peya and Bruno Soares then unseeded Marin Čilić and Santiago González, both 2–1 sets. They lost 2–0 sets to undeeded Robin Haase and Feliciano López in the semifinals. This performance meant Dimitrov reached a new career-best singles ranking of 12th, and also moved 58 places up the doubles rankings, to No. 84.

He then played at French Open, where he was seeded 11th. In round one he lost 3–0 sets to big-serving No. 37 Ivo Karlović, whom he recently beat in Rome.

In June, Dimitrov played at the Queens grass-court event, where he was seeded fourth and had a bye into round two. He beat local No. 168 James Ward in round two, then No. 53 Édouard Roger-Vasselin in the third round, both 2–0 sets. Dimitrov was due to play eighth seed Alexandr Dolgopolov in the quarterfinals, but received a walkover when the Ukrainian retired before the match, citing a thigh injury. Dimitrov then faced first seed, Stan Wawrinka, in the semifinals, and won in straight sets. Dimitrov claimed his first title on a grass court against Feliciano López in three sets, being a set behind and saving a match point. It was the event's first time in which the final was decided with three tiebreakers, as well as being the longest ever Queen's final. Dimitrov also played in the Queens doubles event, with partner world No. 3 Wawrinka (ranked outside the top 150 in the ATP doubles rankings), and in round one they beat local brother wildcard duo of Ken and Neal Skupski in straight sets, but then lost in a tight two-setter to third-seeded Canadian-Serbian veteran duo of Daniel Nestor and Nenad Zimonjić in the second round.

Next, Dimitrov played at the 2014 Wimbledon Championships, where he was seeded 11th. In rounds one and two he beat two qualifiers —No. 150 Ryan Harrison and No. 236 Luke Saville, both in three sets. In round three, in what was his second victory against the Ukrainian out of three matches, he beat 21st seed Alexandr Dolgopolov in a five-set match, coming back from 2–1 sets down. Dimitrov followed that up with a straight sets victory over No. 64 Leonardo Mayer in round four. In the quarterfinals, in what was his second victory against the Brit out of five matches, he beat defending Wimbledon champion and third seed Andy Murray 3–0 sets. This win meant Dimitrov reached his first Grand Slam semifinal, becoming the first male Bulgarian player to reach that stage. He was beaten in four sets by first seed No. 2, Novak Djokovic, who went on to win the tournament. This good performance also meant Dimitrov entered the top-10 ATP rankings for the first time – at No. 9 – becoming the first ever Bulgarian male tennis player to do so.

In the end of July, Dimitrov was due to play at the Washington Open hardcourt event, where he was seeded third, but had to withdraw due to flu and sinus problems. In August, he played at the Canadian Open Masters, where he was seeded No. 7 and had a bye into the second round. In the second and third rounds Dimitrov beat Donald Young and 17th seed Tommy Robredo, both 2–1 sets. Then, in the quarterfinals, in what was his fifth victory against the South-African out of six matches between them, he beat No. 21, Kevin Anderson, 2–1 sets, coming back from a set down and winning the deciding set on a tiebreak. In the semifinals, he lost to 13th seed and eventual champion, Jo-Wilfried Tsonga.

Next, Dimitrov played at the Cincinnati Masters. He was seeded seventh again and had a bye into the second round where he lost to Jerzy Janowicz. At the US Open, Dimitrov was seeded seventh. After Dimitrov defeated Ryan Harrison in the first round, Dudi Sela in the second, and David Goffin in the third, he lost to 20th seed Gaël Monfils in the round of 16 in three close sets, which dropped his tennis ranking to No. 10 after the tournament.

Along with Novak Djokovic and Rafael Nadal, Dimitrov competed in the annual September China Open tournament in Beijing. After defeating Fernando Verdasco and Pablo Andújar, Dimitrov lost to world No. 1 Djokovic in the quarterfinals. Dimitrov's next tournament was the Shanghai Masters, where he was seeded 10th. After defeating Denis Istomin in the first round, Dimitrov lost to the unseeded Julien Benneteau in the second round.

Dimitrov began the defense of his ATP maiden title in Stockholm, winning his second- and third-round matches with Teymuraz Gabashvili and Jack Sock. He beat Bernard Tomic in the semifinals, reaching his sixth career ATP World Tour singles final. Dimitrov lost the final to Tomáš Berdych in three sets.

In Basel, Dimitrov beat teenager Alexander Zverev and Vasek Pospisil in first and second rounds, before losing to top-seeded and eventual champion, Roger Federer, at the quarterfinals for a second year in a row. At the Paris Masters, Dimitrov beat Pablo Cuevas in the second round, but then lost to Andy Murray in the third. This was his last tournament for the year. Dimitrov had an opportunity to qualify for the 2014 ATP World Tour Finals, but he finished 11th. On 22 December 2014, Dimitrov was chosen as the Bulgarian Sportsperson of the Year (earning 1190 points), becoming the first tennis player to win the award.

=== 2015: Australian Open fourth round ===
Dimitrov started the year ranked No. 11. In the beginning of January, he began his season at the Brisbane outdoor hard-court event, where he was seeded fourth and received a bye into the second round. There Dimitrov beat Jérémy Chardy, coming back from a set down and winning the deciding set on a tiebreak. In the quarterfinals, he beat Martin Kližan in straight sets, but then lost to world No. 2 and eventual champion Roger Federer at the semifinals in less than an hour. Dimitrov also played in the doubles event, paired with the Australian teenager Thanasi Kokkinakis, with whom he reached the semifinals.

At the Australian Open, Dimitrov was seeded tenth. In the first round he overcame Dustin Brown in just 69 minutes, then in the second round he beat Lukáš Lacko in four sets and Marcos Baghdatis in five sets in the third round. Dimitrov lost to sixth seed and eventual runner-up, Andy Murray, in the fourth round in four sets. In February, Dimitrov participated in the Rotterdam Open indoor hard-court event, where he was seeded fifth. In the first round he beat the qualifier Paul-Henri Mathieu 2–1 sets, saving two match points in the second set, but then lost in straight sets to world No. 37, Gilles Müller, in the second round. Dimitrov played in Acapulco next, where he was the defending champion and seeded third. He lost in the second round to Ryan Harrison. On 10 March 2015, Dimitrov played at an annual exhibition tournament in Madison Square Garden against Federer, defeating the Swiss star for the first time.

In March Dimitrov played at the Indian Wells Masters, where he was seeded 11th and had a bye into the second round, where he beat in three sets the Australian teenager and world No. 37, Nick Kyrgios. Dimitrov lost to world No. 19, Tommy Robredo, in the third round. Dimitrov also played at the doubles event, paired with Mardy Fish, but they lost in the first round to Spaniards David Ferrer and Fernando Verdasco. Dimitrov was seeded ninth at the Miami Masters and had a bye into the second round, where he beat Vasek Pospisil, but then lost to the 22nd seed John Isner in the third round. Dimitrov began his clay season at the Monte-Carlo Masters. He was seeded ninth and beat Verdasco in the first round, and then defeated in straight sets Fabio Fognini in the second round. In the third round, Dimitrov crushed in less than an hour the seventh seed and defending champion Stan Wawrinka and then lost in straight sets to Gaël Monfils in the quarterfinals. Dimitrov also played in the doubles, paired with Max Mirnyi. They reached the second round, where they lost to the Bryan brothers.

Dimitrov decided not to defend his title in Bucharest, and instead he participated in the first edition of the Istanbul event. He was seeded second and had a bye into the second round, where he defeated Andrey Golubev. In the quarterfinals Dimitrov beat Ivan Dodig, but then lost to Pablo Cuevas in the semifinals. Next, Dimitrov played at the Madrid Masters, where he was seeded tenth. His opponent in the first round Donald Young retired, after Dimitrov was leading by a set and by 3–0 games in the second set. Then, Dimitrov beat Fabio Fognini, coming back from a set down, and overcame eighth seed Stan Wawrinka in three sets in the third round. At the quarterfinals, Dimitrov lost in straight sets to third seed and two-time defending champion Rafael Nadal, which was his sixth defeat out of six matches between them. Dimitrov also played in the doubles and reached the second round.

Dimitrov was unable to defend his semifinal at the Rome Masters in May. He was seeded 10th and beat in straight sets Jerzy Janowicz in the first round, but then lost in three sets to Fabio Fognini, in what was the third match between them within a month. Next, Dimitrov lost in straight sets to Jack Sock at the French Open in the first round despite being seeded tenth. Dimitrov exited the tournament early for a second year in a row.

In June, Dimitrov failed to defend his title at the Queen's Club grass-court event, losing in the second round to Gilles Müller. Next, being seeded 11th, he played at the Wimbledon Championships and in the first two-round eliminated Federico Delbonis and Steve Johnson. Dimitrov lost in straight sets to Richard Gasquet in the third round, in what was his fifth defeat out of five matches against the Frenchman. Following that defeat, Dimitrov decided to part ways with coach Roger Rasheed.

In July, he participated in the 2015 Davis Cup against Luxembourg, winning all his matches. In August, he started his US Open Series campaign in Washington, reaching the third round. Then, he played at the Rogers Cup, losing to Jack Sock in the second round. At the Cincinnati Masters, Dimitrov was eliminated in the third round by the world No. 2, Andy Murray, having missed a match point in the third set. Dimitrov's weak performance continued at the US Open, where he lost in five sets to Mikhail Kukushkin in the second round.

In September, he hired Franco Davín as his coach. Dimitrov reached the quarterfinals in Kuala Lumpur and then in the beginning of October had another first round exit in Tokyo. After these tournament Dimitrov dropped out of top 20. After an unsuccessful Asia swing, Dimitrov traveled to Sweden to participate in the Stockholm Open and reached the quarterfinals where he was defeated by Tomáš Berdych in straight sets. Following that tournament, he traveled to Basel for the Swiss Indoors where he lost to Rafael Nadal in three sets in the round of 16. His last tournament for the year was Paris, where Dimitrov managed to eliminate Marin Čilić, before losing to Ferrer. He did not qualify for the ATP World Tour Finals.

=== 2016: Second US Open fourth round ===
Ranked world No. 28, Dimitrov began the season in Brisbane, where he reached the quarterfinals, losing to Federer. Paired with Kei Nishikori, Dimitrov also reached the semifinals in the doubles, but withdrew due to shoulder soreness. The Bulgarian reached his seventh career final in Sydney, losing to the defending champion Viktor Troicki in three sets and a tie-break in the third set. Next, Dimitrov recorded another defeat to Federer, his fifth overall between the two, in the third round of the Australian Open.

In February, Dimitrov decided to skip the first edition of Sofia Open in his homeland and participated in the Delray Beach event, where he lost to the unseeded Rajeev Ram in the semifinals. Next, Dimitrov lost to the in-form and eventual champion Dominic Thiem at the quarterfinals in Acapulco.

In March, seeded 23rd, Dimitrov had a bye into the second round of Indian Wells, but was upset by the German teenager Alexander Zverev. Dimitrov also had a bye into the second round of the Miami Open. In the third round, he overcame the world No. 2, Andy Murray, coming back from a set down, but then lost to Gaël Monfils.

In April, Dimitrov began his clay-court season. He reached the second round of the Monte-Carlo Masters, losing to the 15th seed Gilles Simon in straight sets. Seeded 2nd, Dimitrov reached his eighth career final in the Istanbul event, beating third seed, Ivo Karlović at the semifinals in two tie-breaks. In the final, against the unseeded Diego Schwartzman, Dimitrov was serving for the match in the second set, but started cramping and then had a complete meltdown. After smashing two rackets, and being warned and penalized, Dimitrov smashed a third racket in the third set, which resulted in a match-ending penalty.

At the Madrid Masters, Dimitrov was unable to defend his quarterfinal from the previous year, suffering a first round exit in straight sets to Pablo Carreño, not having lost even a set to the Spaniard prior to that match. In the following week, Dimitrov's position in the ATP ranking deteriorated further to No.35, a three-year low. The Bulgarian was then beaten again by Alexander Zverev in first round of the Rome Masters. This was followed by another first round loss at the French Open to Viktor Troicki, this time in five sets.

In June, Dimitrov's downfall continued, as he played on grass courts in Stuttgart and in London, losing once again in the first rounds to the wildcard Juan Martín del Potro in straight sets, and to the returning from injury Janko Tipsarević, respectively. Being unseeded at a Major for the first time since 2013, Dimitrov ended his losing streak at the 2016 Wimbledon, first beating qualifier Bjorn Fratangelo and then 16th seed Gilles Simon, before losing to Steve Johnson. Soon after that, Dimitrov revealed that prior to Wimbledon he had split with his coach Franco Davín. The Bulgarian hired Daniel Vallverdu as coach.

In July, Dimitrov was seeded 12th in Washington Open and had a bye into the second round, but had another disappointment, as he lost in straight sets to No. 82, Daniel Evans. At Rogers Cup, Dimitrov survived another early elimination against Yūichi Sugita in the first round, coming back from a set down and facing 2–5 in the second set tiebreak. That was followed by an easy win against wildcard Denis Shapovalov and then Dimitrov beat Ivo Karlović in straight sets in the third round. The Bulgarian lost in three sets to third seed Nishikori in the quarterfinals. Paired with Wawrinka, he beat Lucas Pouille and Dominic Thiem in the doubles, before losing to Henri Kontinen and John Peers.

Dimitrov participated in the 2016 Summer Olympics in the first half of August, but lost in the first round to ninth seed Marin Čilić. The Bulgarian then had a good run in Cincinnati, reaching his third career Masters semifinal. He subsequently beat in straight sets Gilles Simon in the first round and then came back from a set to down to eliminate 16th seed, Feliciano López. In the third round Dimitrov won against second seed Wawrinka and then beat Steve Johnson in the quarterfinals, both in straight sets. In the semifinal he was stopped again by the eventual champion Marin Čilić, after allowing re-breaks twice in the third set. With his performance, the Bulgarian secured the second spot in the 2016 US Open Series standings. In the following week, Dimitrov returned in top 30 of ATP ranking, jumping ten positions to No. 24 spot.

Seeded 22nd, Dimitrov played in the 2016 US Open and reached the fourth round for a second time in his career after beating en route Íñigo Cervantes, Jérémy Chardy and João Sousa before losing in straight sets to second seed, Andy Murray, who allowed Dimitrov only five games in total.

Dimitrov moved to Asia to play in the inaugural Chengdu Open. He was seeded third and reached the semifinals, where he lost to fifth seed Albert Ramos Viñolas. The Bulgarian then went to the final of the Beijing event, beating Steve Johnson, sixth seed Lucas Pouille and gaining first victory over Rafael Nadal, who was ranked No. 4 at the moment. At the semifinals, the third seed, Milos Raonic, withdrew prior to the match with Dimitrov due to ankle injury. Dimitrov lost the final to No. 2, Andy Murray, in two tight sets. The Bulgarian then participated in the Shanghai Masters, where in the first round he overcame in straight sets 14th seed, Richard Gasquet, to whom Dimitrov had had a negative record of 0–5 losses, but in the second lost to qualifier Vasek Pospisil, who had never beaten Dimitrov.

The Bulgarian returned to Europe and reached the semifinals in Stockholm, where he was stopped by the eventual champion Juan Martín del Potro. Dimitrov then played in Basel, but exited the event with a first round loss against Gilles Müller. In his last tournament for the season, the Paris Masters, Dimitrov lost in three sets to No. 1, Novak Djokovic, in the third round.

=== 2017: Major semifinal, Masters & ATP Finals titles, world No. 3 ===
Ranked world No. 17, Dimitrov had a flying start to the season in Brisbane, reaching the final by defeating world No. 8, Dominic Thiem in the quarterfinals and then No. 3 and defending champion Milos Raonic in the semifinals. In the final he overcame world No. 5, Kei Nishikori, in three sets, winning his first ATP title in nearly three years, his last having been at Queen's Club in 2014. Dimitrov next moved on to play in the 2017 Australian Open, where he extended his winning streak further, reaching the semifinals. Dimitrov beat 18th seed, Richard Gasquet, in the third round and 11th seed David Goffin in the quarterfinals, before being eliminated by Rafael Nadal in a five-set thriller, which lasted almost five hours, with Dimitrov failing to convert double break points in the fifth set when the score was 4–3 for Dimitrov. The match with Nadal was later cited among the top 3 of best Grand Slam matches in 2017.

In February, Dimitrov competed in the Sofia Open, where he was seeded third. The Bulgarian maintained his excellent start to the season, winning his second title of the year on home soil, defeating second seed, David Goffin, in straight sets in the final. However, the Belgian managed to grab his first victory over Dimitrov, eliminating him in three sets in the quarterfinals of the Rotterdam Open.

In March, Dimitrov played in the Indian Wells Masters, losing in three sets to Jack Sock in the third round, after missing four match points. The Bulgarian then participated in the Miami Open, but was upset by unseeded Guido Pella in the second round.

Dimitrov began his clay-court season with a loss to Tommy Robredo in the second round of the Grand Prix Hassan II tournament, for which he received a wildcard and was the top seed. This was followed by another upset at the Monte-Carlo Masters, where Dimitrov was seeded eighth and had a bye into the second round, but lost to qualifier Jan-Lennard Struff.

The Bulgarian ended his losing streak in the Madrid Masters, reaching the third round, where he was eliminated by Dominic Thiem in three tight sets after missing five match points in the third-set tiebreak. Next, Dimitrov had a first-round exit in the Rome Masters, being defeated by Juan Martín del Potro in three sets. This was the fifth loss to the Argentine in five meetings. Dimitrov then went to the third round of the French Open, where he lost to Pablo Carreño Busta.

Dimitrov started on grass court in Stuttgart. He was seeded second, but lost in his first match. The Bulgarian then had a good run at the Queen's Club event, where he reached the semifinals. Dimitrov lost in three sets to in-form eventual champion Feliciano López. Without dropping a set, the Bulgarian reached the fourth round at Wimbledon, but then lost in straight sets to eventual champion Roger Federer in what was his sixth defeat in six official matches with the Swiss. Dimitrov returned to the top ten for the first time since February 2015 at the conclusion of the tournament.

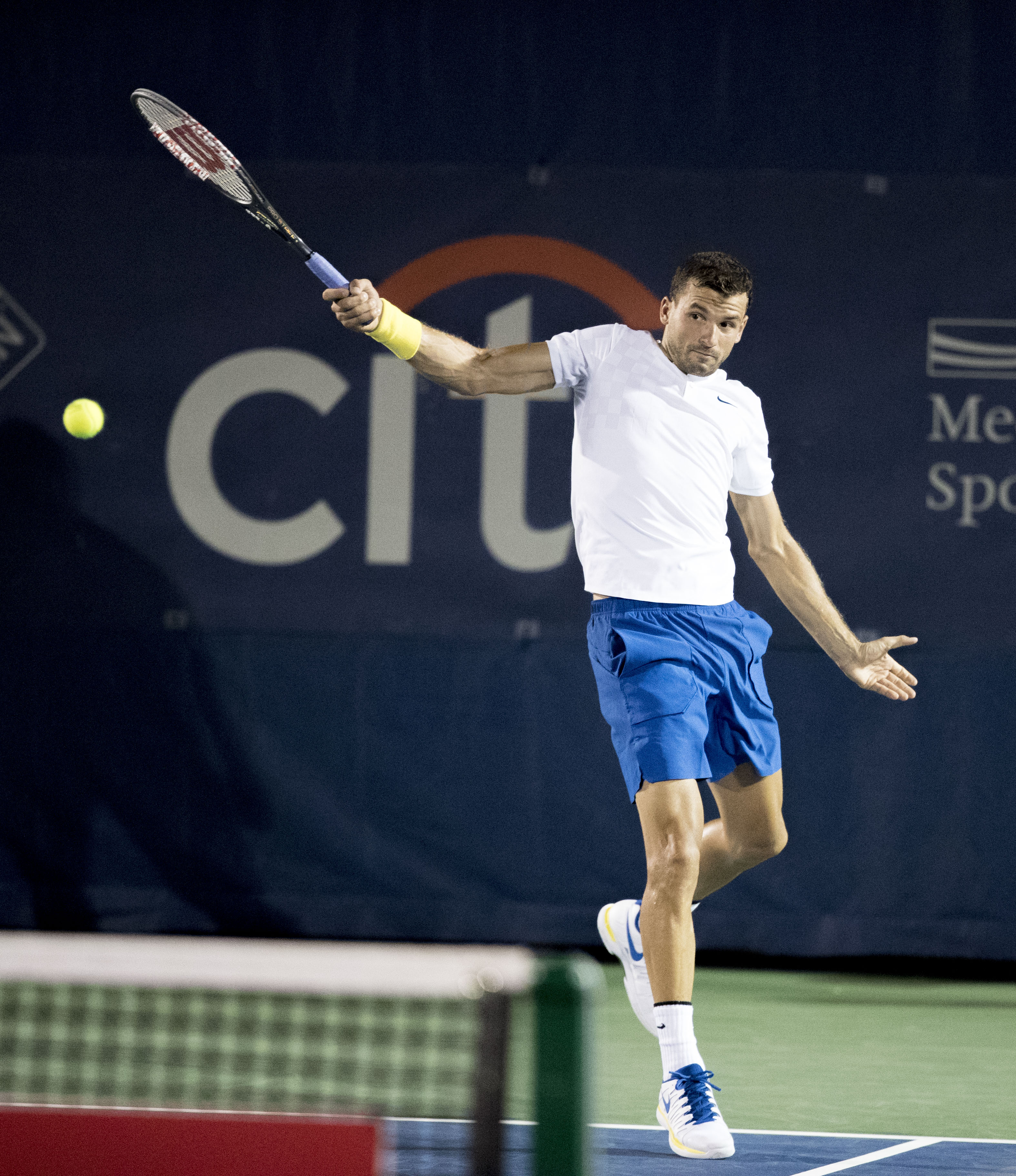
Dimitrov at the 2017 Washington Open

Dimitrov returned to hard courts in August. After reaching third rounds at the Washington Open and the Rogers Cup in Montreal, the Bulgarian won his first Masters 1000 title in Cincinnati, defeating Nick Kyrgios in the final in straight sets, winning the tournament without losing a set. Dimitrov then reached the second round of the US Open, where he lost to teenager Andrey Rublev.

In the beginning of October, Dimitrov reached the semifinals in Beijing after wins over Juan Martín del Potro and Roberto Bautista Agut, and then the quarterfinals of the Shanghai Masters. In both events the Bulgarian was eliminated by world No. 1, Rafael Nadal, in three-setters. Dimitrov then advanced to the final of the Stockholm Open with wins over Jerzy Janowicz, Mischa Zverev and Fabio Fognini but lost to US Open semifinalist del Potro in straight sets. This was Dimitrov's third final in Stockholm. In the following week, Dimitrov was confirmed to participate for the first time at the ATP Finals, thus becoming the first Bulgarian to qualify for the season-ending championships.

Afterwards, he decided to skip the Vienna Open (despite being given a wildcard) due to fatigue, and to prepare for the Paris Masters the following week, where Dimitrov grabbed third victory in a row over Richard Gasquet before losing in the third round to big serving John Isner in three sets. On the following week, prior to the ATP Finals, Dimitrov achieved a new career high, climbing to world No. 6 position.

Dimitrov was drawn in the Pete Sampras group of the 2017 ATP Finals, together with Rafael Nadal, Dominic Thiem and David Goffin. Playing with Thiem in his debut match, Dimitrov clinched a maiden victory in the ATP Finals in a tight three-setter. The Bulgarian then routed Goffin, allowing only two games to his opponent. With this win Dimitrov won the first place in the group and secured his place at the semi-finals. Dimitrov stayed perfect in the group after another convincing victory, this time against alternate Pablo Carreño Busta. The Bulgarian came back from a set down to ultimately eliminate in-form Jack Sock in the semi-finals. Dimitrov won the biggest title of his career by defeating once again David Goffin in three tight sets in the final. He finished the tournament as an undefeated champion, receiving a prize of $2,549,000 and 1,500 ranking points, the latter helped him finish 2017 at a career-high world No. 3 (only behind Nadal and Federer).

Dimitrov ended his 2017 season with these significant milestones [current figure in brackets]: (1) first Masters 1000 title (2) first ATP Finals crown, (3) 5 Tour finals, (4) four tour titles, (5) eight top-10 match wins [had 13 total prior to 2017], (6) 250 career match wins [257 match wins], (7) cracked $10,000,000 in career earnings [$13,103,976], (8) cracked $5,000,000 in a single season [$5,628,512], (9) second Grand Slam semifinal, (10) first Grand Slam semifinal on hard courts.

=== 2018: Australian Open quarterfinal, 15th final, Laver Cup win ===
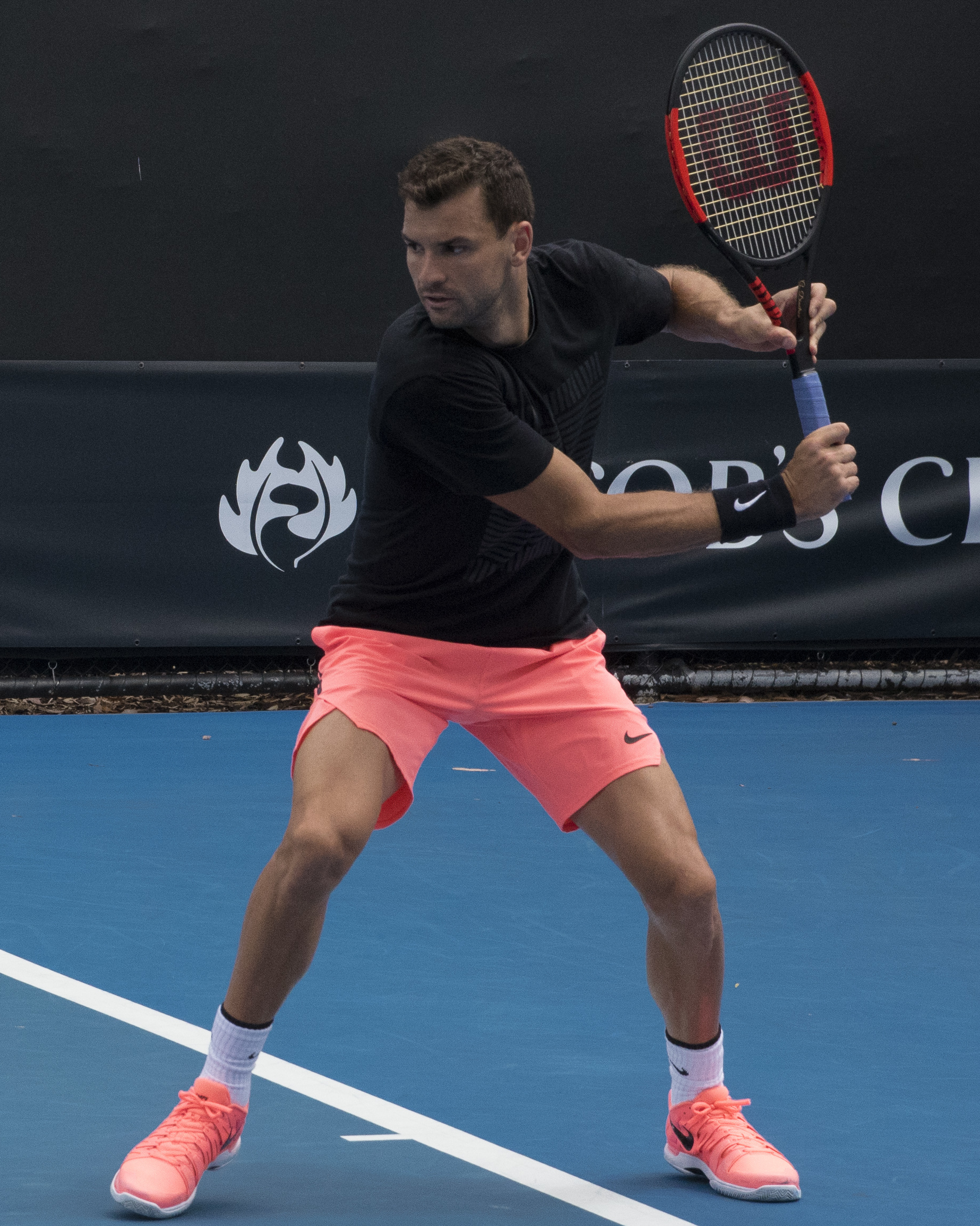
Dimitrov at the 2018 Australian Open

Dimitrov started his 2018 campaign in Brisbane, where he was the defending champion and top seed. He started from the second round with hard three set win against the home favourite and wild card John Millman, then overcame with another three setter the British number two Kyle Edmund. Dimitrov was eliminated in the semi-finals by the third seed and eventual champion Nick Kyrgios. The Bulgarian played in the doubles as well. Paired with Ryan Harrison, he reached the semifinals, before withdrawing. Having started his campaign at Australian Open with a couple of wins against qualifiers Dennis Novak and Mackenzie McDonald, Dimitrov was drawn against Andrey Rublev who had knocked him out in the second round of US Open several months before and took revenge, eliminating the 30th seeded Russian. Dimitrov then edged in form Nick Kyrgios in tight four sets to qualify for his third Australian Open quarter-final, where he lost to Kyle Edmund in four sets. In the following week Dimitrov stated that he had played the last matches with a shoulder injury. Failing to recover, the Bulgarian withdrew from the Sofia Open, where he was defending champion.

In February, Dimitrov reached the final of the Rotterdam Open without dropping a set, defeating Yūichi Sugita, Filip Krajinović, Andrey Rublev, and David Goffin en route, but eventually lost to Roger Federer, who would regain world No. 1 ranking after the tournament. Next, Dimitrov played in Dubai, where he was top seed, but was upset in the first round by Malek Jaziri.

In March, Dimitrov was third seed at both the Indian Wells and Miami Masters, but faced early eliminations by Fernando Verdasco in the second round and by Jérémy Chardy in the third round, respectively.

Dimitrov rebounded on the next tournament, the Monte-Carlo Masters, advancing to the semi-finals of the clay event after beating No. 10 David Goffin in the quarter-finals. Dimitrov ultimately lost to world No. 1 Rafael Nadal. That was followed by a quarter-final in Barcelona, where Dimitrov lost to Pablo Carreño Busta. After the match ending handshake, Dimitrov accused Carreño Busta of stopping the point in the second set tie-break, which led to an unforced error by the Bulgarian. Carreño Busta denied the accusations.

In May, Dimitrov lost in the second rounds of the Madrid and Rome Masters to Milos Raonic and Kei Nishikori, respectively. Dimitrov then lost in straight sets to Fernando Verdasco in the third round of the French Open.

Dimitrov had his worst grass-court season since 2010, having recorded early losses to Novak Djokovic at the Queen's Club tournament and to Stan Wawrinka at the Wimbledon Championships. The second of the defeats came in the first round of the Grand Slam event.

Dimitrov next played in August at the Toronto Masters, where he reached the quarterfinals, losing to Kevin Anderson. Dimitrov then failed to defend his Masters title in Cincinnati after he was beaten in the third round by the eventual champion Novak Djokovic in a tight three-setter. As a result, Dimitrov's ranking dropped to world No. 8. That was followed by first round elimination at the 2018 US Open, with Dimitrov losing to Stan Wawrinka in straights.

Dimitrov contributed to Team Europe for winning the second edition of the Laver Cup. However his struggles with form continued after early exits at the China Open and in Vienna, losing to unseeded Dušan Lajović and Mikhail Kukushkin, respectively. Dimitrov's season ended after the Paris Masters, where he lost to fifth seed, Marin Čilić in the third round. Dimitrov didn't qualify for the ATP Finals, where he was the defending champion. Former world No. 1, Andre Agassi, joined Dimitrov's team prior to the Paris Masters.

=== 2019: Shoulder injury, US Open semifinal ===
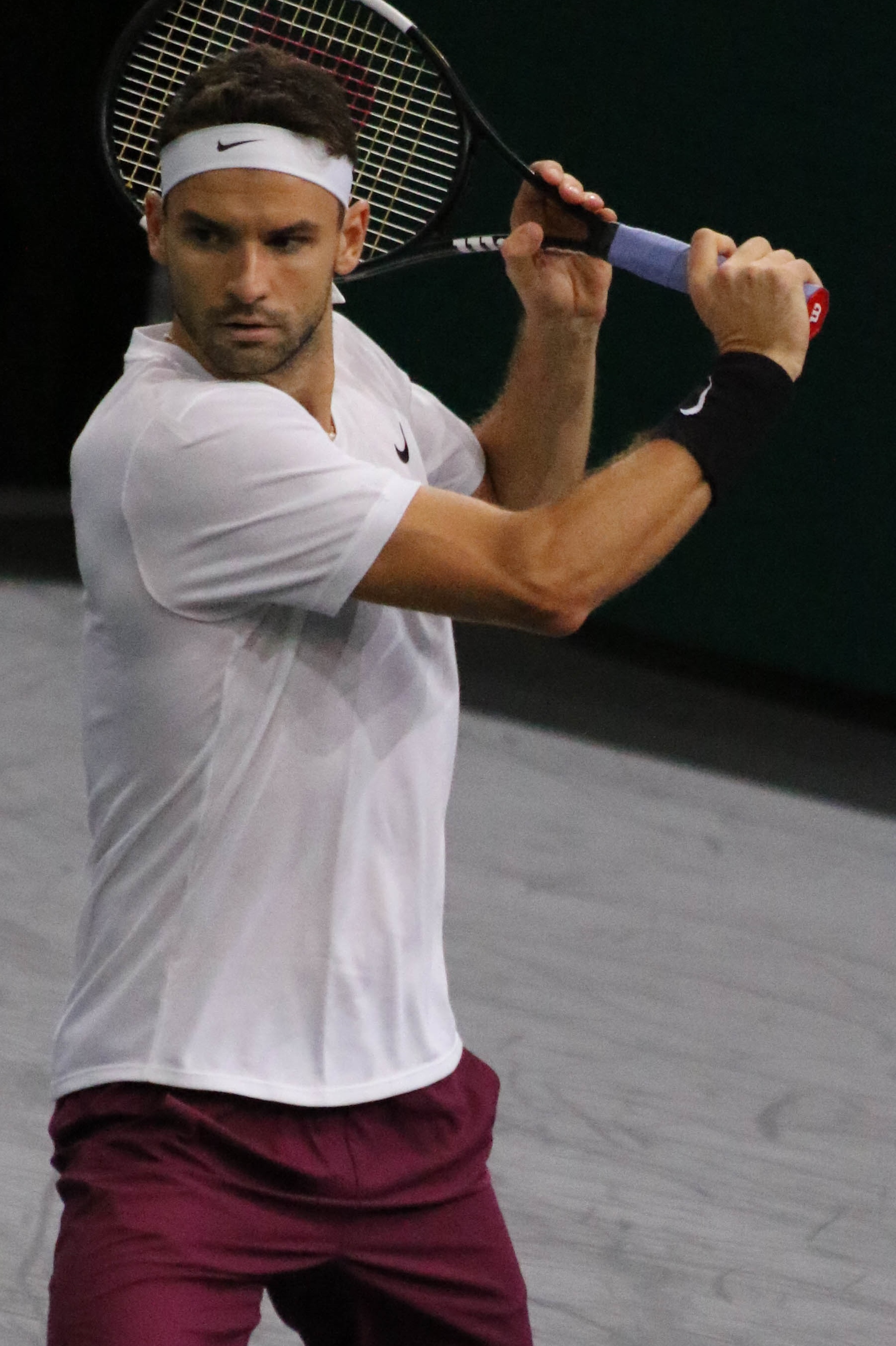
Dimitrov at the 2019 Rolex Paris Masters

Dimitrov started his campaign in Brisbane where he defeated Yoshihito Nishioka and John Millman in straight sets before losing to eventual champion Kei Nishikori in the quarterfinals. In January, Dimitrov reached the last 16 of the 2019 Australian Open, but was knocked out by Frances Tiafoe in four sets.

Having suffered from a shoulder injury, Dimitrov returned to play in the Miami Masters, reaching the third round. Dimitrov then started his clay court campaign at the Monte-Carlo Masters, where he lost to Rafael Nadal in the third round. Dimitrov then went to the third round of Barcelona Open. His ranking deteriorated to No. 49, the lowest since 2012. At the French Open, Dimitrov upset Marin Čilić in the second round but was subsequently eliminated by Stan Wawrinka in straight sets. Dimitrov had a disappointing Wimbledon, losing to Corentin Moutet in five sets in the first round, despite being up two sets.

Dimitrov's hard court season started off poorly. He lost in the first round of the Atlanta Open to world No. 405 Kevin King, who had never won a main-draw match on the ATP Tour. Dimitrov then lost to Stan Wawrinka in the first rounds of both the Rogers Cup and the Western & Southern Open. Following this, Dimitrov had lost seven of his past eight matches, and his ranking had slipped to No. 78, his lowest ranking in over seven years.

At the US Open, Dimitrov was unseeded. He defeated Andreas Seppi in the first round before receiving a walkover over 12th seed Borna Ćorić. He then defeated lucky loser Kamil Majchrzak and Alex de Minaur in straight sets to reach the quarterfinals. There, he faced third seed Roger Federer. In a lengthy five-set match, Dimitrov upset Federer to reach his first Grand Slam semifinal since the 2017 Australian Open. This was also his first career win against Federer, having been defeated on seven previous occasions. He then lost to Daniil Medvedev in the semifinals. As a result of this run, Dimitrov rose 53 ranking places in a single tournament, appearing at World No. 25 the next week.

Dimitrov failed to proceed beyond the second round at Chengdu, Beijing, Stockholm, and Vienna. At the Paris Masters, he defeated Ugo Humbert and 12th seed David Goffin to reach the third round, where he defeated the fifth seed Dominic Thiem. In the quarterfinals, he defeated Cristian Garín, before losing to Djokovic in straight sets in the semifinals.

=== 2020: Inaugural ATP Cup captain, French Open fourth round ===
In January, Dimitrov participated and led as captain the Bulgarian team in the inaugural 2020 ATP Cup where the top 24 countries qualified based on the singles ATP ranking of their No. 1 country player. The Bulgarian team was No. 19 based on Dimitrov's ranking and part of Group C where Dimitrov won both his single matches against the top players of Great Britain, Dan Evans, and Moldova, Radu Albot. He pulled a victory in doubles where as the underdogs he and teammate Alexandar Lazarov stunned the top British experienced pair of Jamie Murray/Joe Salisbury in a close three sets match.

In October, Dimitrov reached the fourth round of the French Open for the first time, defeating Roberto Carballés Baena, where he lost to Stefanos Tsitsipas in straight sets.

He finished the year in the top 20 for the fifth year in a row, ranked world No. 19.

=== 2021: Australian Open quarterfinal, Indian Wells semifinal ===
In February, Dimitrov seeded 18th reached his fourth quarterfinal at the Australian Open, defeating former Grand Slam champion Marin Čilić in the first round, Alex Bolt, 15th seed Pablo Carreño Busta by retirement and third seed and the previous year's runner-up Dominic Thiem in the fourth round, before losing to qualifier Aslan Karatsev after suffering from back spasms.

Dimitrov retired in the first round of the French Open against Marcos Giron for the same reasons as a result of his back problems, after failing to convert three match points in the third set. Seeded 18th at the 2021 Wimbledon Championships, he lost to Alexander Bublik in the second round in three straight sets with two tiebreaks after Bublik hit 34 aces against Dimitrov. He took his revenge by defeating Bublik at the 2021 Western & Southern Open Masters in Cincinnati to reach the round of 16. He lost to Daniil Medvedev in straight sets. At the US Open, he retired with a foot injury after losing the first two sets to Alexei Popyrin in the second round. He dropped out of the top 25, since he could not defend his points from the 2019 US Open semifinal, to No. 29 on 13 September 2021.

In late September, Dimitrov recorded his first win over Márton Fucsovics in three ATP head-to-head meetings at the 2021 San Diego Open to reach the second round. He then won in the second round defeating ATP Tour debutant and lucky loser August Holmgren (tennis), after Félix Auger-Aliassime withdrawal, in straight sets 6–1, 6–1 in a 56 minutes match to reach his fifth quarterfinal of the season. He reached his first semifinal of the year defeating Aslan Karatsev in three sets and taking his revenge for his earlier in the year loss at the AO. In the semifinals, he lost to eventual champion Casper Ruud.

At Indian Wells, Dimitrov reached the round of 16 for the first time in his career, defeating en route qualifier Daniel Altmaier and then-world No. 20 and 16th seed Reilly Opelka in straight sets with no breaks, taking his revenge for his earlier in the year loss to the American at the Canadian Open. In the fourth round, Dimitrov defeated world No. 2 and top seed Daniil Medvedev 4–6, 6–4, 6–3 to reach the quarterfinals. He came back from a set and a double-break down at 4–6, 1–4 to eliminate the reigning US Open champion and earn his first win over a top 2 opponent since 2016. In the quarterfinals, he defeated eighth seed Hubert Hurkacz rallying again from a set down to reach the semifinals for the first time in his career at this Masters. He then lost to Cameron Norrie in the semi-finals.

At the Paris Masters, he defeated wildcard Richard Gasquet and 2018 champion Karen Khachanov in the second round, with the last set being 6–0. He lost to fourth seed Alexander Zverev in the round of 16.

=== 2022: 350th win, Masters semifinal, 30th Top 10 win ===
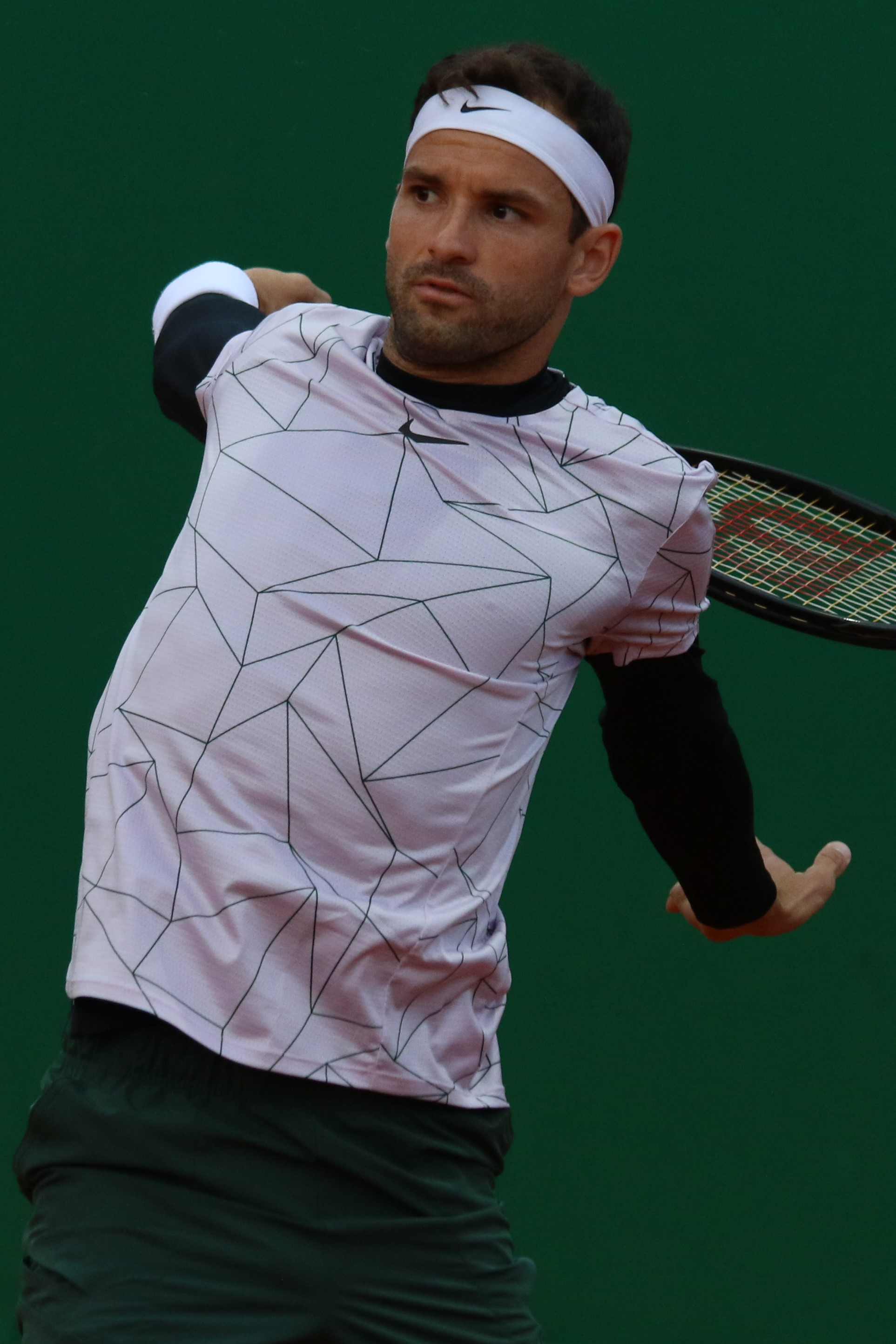
Dimitrov at the 2022 Monte-Carlo Masters

The season for Dimitrov began at the Melbourne Summer Set tournament, where he reached the semifinals, before losing to qualifier Maxime Cressy. Next, he participated in the Australian Open but he lost in the second round to Benoît Paire. At the 2022 Delray Beach Open following his second round win over Mitchell Krueger, Dimitrov became only the second man born in the ‘90s or later to reach 350 career wins, after Milos Raonic. He was the 130th man in the Open Era and the 22nd active player to do it.

In March, Dimitrov reached the quarterfinals of the Indian Wells Masters before losing to seventh seed Andrey Rublev in straight sets. At the Monte-Carlo Masters, he reached the semifinals with an upset against fourth seed Casper Ruud and again 11th seed Hubert Hurkacz. At the French Open, he lost in the third round to 15th seed Diego Schwartzman in straight sets, whom Dimitrov defeated also in straight sets at the Madrid Open. At Wimbledon, he retired in the first round against Steve Johnson.

At the Canadian Open, he reached the second round in singles and in doubles with Andrey Rublev defeating Canadian wildcard debutant Alexis Galarneau and Wimbledon doubles champions Ebden/Purcell respectively. The pair also reached the second round of the 2022 Western & Southern Open defeating Dan Evans and John Peers. Following two straight first-round losses at the 2022 Sofia Open and the 2022 Stockholm Open, he won his opening match at the 2022 Erste Bank Open in Vienna against Thiago Monteiro. Next he defeated world No. 8 and third seed Andrey Rublev (his 30th top-10 win) to reach the quarterfinals and Marcos Giron to reach his third semifinal of the season. He lost to world No. 4 and top seed eventual champion, Daniil Medvedev, in straight sets. At the 2022 Rolex Paris Masters he reached the third round defeating Botic van de Zandschulp, lucky loser Fabio Fognini, before losing to world No. 1, Carlos Alcaraz, to end his season.

He finished the year in the top 30 for the tenth year in a row, ranked world No. 28 on 21 November 2022. Based on this ranking, being the Bulgarian male player No. 1, he was confirmed two days later as a participant at the 2023 United Cup as part of the Bulgarian team.

=== 2023: Inaugural United Cup, 400th win & return to the top 15 ===
Dimitrov reached the third round at the 2023 Australian Open defeating Aslan Karatsev and Laslo Djere before losing in straight sets to eventual champion Novak Djokovic, who went on to win his 10th Australian Open and 22nd Grand Slam.

At the Rotterdam Open, he defeated again Karatsev in 59 minutes to reach the second round. Next he defeated world No. 10 and fifth seed Hubert Hurkacz in straight sets to reach the quarterfinals. He reached his 43rd career semifinal defeating Alex de Minaur in three sets and first since 2018 at this tournament. As a result, he returned to the top 25 in the rankings. He lost to world No. 11 and sixth seed Daniil Medvedev in straight sets.

At the 2023 BNP Paribas Open, he lost in the second round (having received a bye) to Jason Kubler after retirement with a right-knee injury in the third set. In Miami he won his second round match against qualifier Jan-Lennard Struff.

In Monte-Carlo, he won in the first round over Ben Shelton before losing to Jiří Lehečka. As a result, he dropped outside of the top 30 on 17 April 2023 in the rankings being unable to defend his semifinal points from the previous year. In Madrid he defeated Grégoire Barrère in the second round before losing to top seed Carlos Alcaraz. In Rome, he defeated Stan Wawrinka in the second round, before also losing to the top seed, world No. 1 Novak Djokovic.

In Geneva, he won his first two rounds matches against Roberto Carballés Baena and Christopher O'Connell to reach the semifinals. He reached his first final since 2018 defeating second seed and top-10 player Taylor Fritz before losing in the final to Nicolás Jarry. Dimitrov reached the fourth round at Roland Garros for the second time at this major, defeating qualifier Timofey Skatov, Emil Ruusuvuori and Daniel Altmaier without losing a set. He lost to 22nd seed Alexander Zverev in straight sets.

He qualified for the main draw at the 2023 Queen's Club Championships and reached the quarterfinals also without dropping a set, defeating eight seed Francisco Cerundolo. He lost to top seed and world No. 2, Carlos Alcaraz, in straight sets. His good form continued at the 2023 Wimbledon Championships reaching the fourth round without losing a set, defeating top 10 player Frances Tiafoe, before losing to world No. 6, Holger Rune. He returned to the top 20 on 24 July 2023.

In the beginning of the North American Summer swing, seeded fifth, he reached the semifinals at the Washington Open after a walkover from Ugo Humbert, before losing to eventual champion Dan Evans. At the US Open he reached the second round, defeating Alex Molcan after coming from a two sets to love down deficit for the first time in his career, saving three match balls, in five sets with three tiebreaks, in a match lasting close to 4 hours and 40 minutes, the longest of the day. Next he reached the third round defeating Andy Murray, before losing to Alexander Zverev, his third straight loss to the German in the season.

He recorded his 400th career win at the 2023 Chengdu Open defeating Juan Pablo Varillas becoming the first man born in the 1990 or later to hit that milestone and the tenth active men's player. He reached the semifinals defeating Christopher O'Connell. He lost to Alexander Zverev for a seventh consecutive time (fourth straight season loss), in straight sets. In the next tournament, the China Open of the Asian swing, he came back from a 2–6, 1–5 deficit, for a second time in the season, and won his first-round match against wildcard Mackenzie McDonald. Next, he defeated third seed Holger Rune for his fourth top 10 win (the most since the 2017 season), to reach the quarterfinals of this tournament for the fourth time in eight appearances.

At Shanghai, he reached the fourth round defeating 13th seed Karen Khachanov. Next he defeated world No. 2 and top seed Carlos Alcaraz to reach the quarterfinals of a Masters 1000 for the first time in the season and only the second time at this Masters. He defeated Nicolás Jarry and reached his first Masters semifinal since the 2022 Monte-Carlo Masters. He lost to sixth seed Andrey Rublev. He continued his good form on the European indoor hardcourts in Vienna and defeated Lorenzo Musetti in straight sets in the first round but lost to top seed Daniil Medvedev in the second in three sets. At the next Masters in Paris he reached again the round of 16 defeating world No. 3 Medvedev this time, winning at the seventh match point, his third top-5 win within a month and sixth top-10 of the season, tied together with Alex de Minaur. Next, he defeated Alexander Bublik in straight sets to reach back-to-back quarterfinals at a Masters level. He reached his second, consecutive Masters semifinal for the season defeating 11th seed Hubert Hurkacz for his 40th win. Next he defeated seventh seed Stefanos Tsitsipas and reached his first Masters final since 2017, where he lost to Novak Djokovic. As a result, he returned to the top 15, at world No. 14 on 6 November 2023.

=== 2024: Major and Masters quarterfinals career set, 40th Top 10 & 450th wins ===
Starting the season at Brisbane, he reached his third final at the tournament and 18th in his career overall defeating Andy Murray, Daniel Altmaier, wildcard Rinky Hijikata and Jordan Thompson. He defeated top seed Holger Rune in the final to win his ninth title and first since 2017. With the title win, he recorded more match wins (23) than any other player at this tournament. As a result, he moved to No. 13 in the singles rankings on 8 January 2024, his highest since 2018.

Seeded 13th at the 2024 Australian Open where he made his record 52nd consecutive major appearance, he reached the second round with a win over Marton Fucsovics, and then won over Kokkinakis in the second round, but lost in the third round to Nuno Borges.

He reached his second final of the season in Marseille defeating Sebastian Korda, Arthur Rinderknech and Karen Khachanov. In the final he lost to fourth seed Ugo Humbert. He reached back to back semifinals at the Rotterdam Open, defeating Lorenzo Sonego, again Marton Fucsovics and Alexander Shevchenko. He lost in the semifinals to Alex de Minaur, ending the week with the most ATP singles wins, at 13, since the beginning of the season.

In Indian Wells, he reached the fourth round defeating two Frenchmen Alexandre Müller and 21st seed Adrian Mannarino. As a result, he returned to his highest ranking of world No. 12 on 18 March 2024 for the first time since 29 October 2018 when he was ranked at No. 10. Seeded 11th at the 2024 Miami Open, he reached the fourth round defeating Alejandro Tabilo in three sets and Yannick Hanfmann in a 46 minutes match, conceding one game. He won his next match against world No. 9 and eight seed Hubert Hurkacz and thus completed the full career set of quarterfinal showings at all nine active Masters events becoming the ninth active man to accomplish this feat after Nadal, Djokovic, Murray, Monfils, Čilić, Thiem, Tsitsipas and Zverev. With making his 19th Masters quarterfinal in Miami, he reached that stage or higher of at least one Masters event every season for 12 years in a row since 2013. With his 40th top 10 win over world No. 2 and top seed Carlos Alcaraz in the quarterfinals, he reached the semifinals of all Masters with the exception of the Madrid Open. He became just the third man born in 1990 or later to record 40 or more Top 10 wins after Alexander Zverev and Daniil Medvedev and the eight active player overall. Dimitrov reached his third Masters final defeating back to back top 5 players (last time was in Brisbane 2017), for his first win against fourth seed Alexander Zverev in 10 years, and 20th overall against the top 5. He returned for the first time in 260 weeks (3rd longest gap in the Open Era) since November 2018 to the top 10 at world No. 9 in the rankings. In the final, he lost in straight sets to world No. 3 and second seed Jannik Sinner.

At the 2024 Monte-Carlo Masters, he played the longest best-of-three match in the tournament history lasting 3 and half hours before succumbing to seventh seed Holger Rune in the round of 16. It was also the third-longest match of any kind at this Masters 1000. At the 2024 Italian Open he reached again the round of 16, for the first time since 2020 at this Masters, defeating two lefties Yoshihito Nishioka and qualifier Térence Atmane. In the fourth round, he lost to 11th seed Taylor Fritz in three sets.

With his win in the round of 16 over Hubert Hurkacz at the 2024 French Open, Dimitrov became the second player born in the 1990s, after Daniil Medvedev, to complete the career set of both Grand Slam and Masters 1000 quarterfinals and the sixth active player overall to accomplish the feat (after Djokovic, Nadal, Murray, Marin Čilić and Medvedev).

At the 2024 Wimbledon Championships, he came back from two sets to love deficit for the second time in his career, defeating Shang Juncheng to reach the third round. It was the ninth overall comeback from two sets down in a single edition of the All England Club, tying the record (with 1974, 1990 and 1997) for most comebacks at the tournament in the Open Era.

At the US Open, he reached again the round of 16 for a third Grand Slam in a row in the season, with straight sets wins over qualifier Kyrian Jacquet, Rinky Hijikata and Tallon Griekspoor, not facing a break point in the last match. He defeated sixth seed Andrey Rublev in five sets, his 450th career win, to reach his second quarterfinal at this Grand Slam and eight overall. He became the first player born in the 1990s to reach 300 hardcourt wins.

He was selected as part of the winning team Europe for a second time at the 2024 Laver Cup. At the 2024 Shanghai Masters, Dimitrov recorded his 40th win for the season defeating 20th seed Alexei Popyrin, to reach the round of 16. It was his second consecutive season where he recorded 40+ wins. With reaching the semifinals at the 2024 Stockholm Open, he recorded his 100th indoor win over Dominic Stricker, becoming the first man born in the 1990 or later to accomplish the feat. Dimitrov reached his 21st ATP career final, fourth of the season, and third at the tournament, defeating seventh seed Tallon Griekspoor in three sets. At the 2024 Rolex Paris Masters where he was a previous year runner-up, Dimitrov made his 20th Masters quarterfinal of his career, keeping his chances alive to qualify for the ATP Finals in Turin in November. Dimitrov moved ahead of Roger Federer and tied with Pete Sampras and Marat Safin for fourth all-time record wins at the tournament with 24. He lost to Karen Khachanov in straight sets.

=== 2025: 25th win in Brisbane, consecutive Miami semifinal, injury ===
With his first round win over Yannick Hanfmann at the Brisbane International, Dimitrov became the player with the most wins in the tournament history, with a win-loss record of 24–6, surpassing fellow two-time titlist Andy Murray. He then defeated home favorite Aleksandar Vukic to reach the quarterfinals, his record breaking 25th win at the event. He moved past Jordan Thompson to move to the semifinals after Thompson retired mid-match. Dimitrov would go onto retire from his semifinal match against Jiri Lehecka, ending his title defence. At the Australian Open, he was drawn against Fabio Fognini, who would eventually withdraw from the tournament before the match. Dimitrov faced Francesco Passaro and retired from his match during the second set. In Doha, Dimitrov faced Lehecka again, this time losing in straight sets to the Czech. In Dubai, he retired after losing the first set against Christopher O'Connell.

In Indian Wells, Dimitrov played a marathon match against the 38-year-old Gaël Monfils, battling a thumb injury in the process, to make the round of 16. He lost to eventual semifinalist Carlos Alcaraz. At the Miami Open where he was defending runner-up points from 2024, Dimitrov reached the quarterfinals with wins over 22nd seed Karen Khachanov and 31st seed Brandon Nakashima. He reached consecutive semifinals at the tournament defeating 23rd seed Francisco Cerúndolo after nearly three hours, in three sets, while saving a match point in the process. He lost to the eventual finalist, Novak Djokovic, in their first match since their Masters 1000 final in Paris. As he was unable to defend his finalist points, he dropped to a ranking of world No. 18.

During the spring clay season, Dimitrov reached the quarterfinals in Monte-Carlo, the fourth round in Madrid, and the second round in Rome. He lost in straight sets without winning a single game in his quarterfinal match in Monte-Carlo against Alex de Minaur, in a deciding set against Gabriel Diallo in Madrid, and to Francesco Passaro in straight sets in Rome. At the French Open, despite leading two sets to one against Ethan Quinn, Dimitrov retired from his first round match, marking his 4th consecutive Grand Slam tournament in which he retired from his match.

In the summer, Dimitrov withdrew from the Queen's Club Championships due to injury. At Wimbledon, he won his first match against Yoshihito Nishioka in straight sets to record his first match win at the majors of the year. He later defeated Corentin Moutet in the second round, and won against Sebastian Ofner in straight sets during the third, marking his 100th career Grand Slam win. He faced world No. 1 Jannik Sinner in the fourth round, and although Dimitrov won the first two sets, he suffered a sudden pectoral injury in the third set and was forced to retire at his fifth consecutive Grand Slam. As a result, Dimitrov skipped Bastad and eventually the entire North American Summer tournaments including the US Open.

Dimitrov returned to the ATP Tour at the 2025 Rolex Paris Masters. In doubles, Dimitrov partnered Nicolas Mahut in Mahut's last tournament of his career. They lost in the first round in a match tiebreak, ending Mahut's career. In singles, Dimitrov beat Mpetshi Perricard in the first round, however withdrew from his second round encounter with Daniil Medvedev, citing a shoulder injury. This brought his 2025 season to an end.

=== 2026: 50th grass court win ===
Dimitrov started his season in Brisbane with a victory over Pablo Carreño Busta, his first win since 2025 Paris. He then lost his opening round at the 2026 Australian Open to Tomáš Macháč. He also lost in the first round at the 2026 Dallas Open and Acapulco Open to Alex Michelsen and Térence Atmane, respectively. Dimitrov showed better form in Indian Wells, exacting his revenge on Térence Atmane, but lost to Carlos Alcaraz in the second round.

However, Dimitrov then failed to win a match in any of the three next Masters 1000 events, losing to Raphaël Collignon, Tomás Martín Etcheverry and Daniel Vallejo in Miami, Monte-Carlo and Madrid, respectively. This was the first time since March 2012 that Dimitrov was ranked outside the Top 100 and thus was only able to play through qualifying in Grand Slam events. Dimitrov failed in the qualifying competition for the first time since the 2010 Australian Open, losing in the first round at the 2026 French Open to tenth qualifying seed Jaime Faria, despite serving for the match at 5–3.

At the 2026 Mallorca Championships, competing with a wildcard, Dimitrov recorded his 50th win on grass and became the seventh active player with the most grass court wins. Next, he reached his first ATP quarterfinal since 2025 Wimbledon. As a result, he returned to the top 150 in the singles rankings on 29 June 2026.

Dimitrov also received a wildcard for the main draw at the 2026 Wimbledon Championships.

After this, he got another wildcard to the Nordea where he won his first round, but lost in the second round to Nuno Borges in two sets.

In the Cincinnati masters, he lost in the first round in three sets to Sebastian Baez despite being up a break in the third set.

He also qualified for the 2026 US Open (tennis) where he lost to Alexei Popyrin in 4 sets.

== National representation ==
=== Davis Cup ===
Dimitrov made his Davis Cup debut for Bulgaria in 2008 as a 16-year-old. Playing in front of a home crowd in Plovdiv, the teenage Dimitrov compiled an undefeated record in both singles and doubles to promote his country into the second division of the Europe/Africa zone. A 17-year-old Dimitrov returned to the Bulgarian Davis Cup team for the first round of the Davis Cup Europe/Africa zone in 2009. Dimitrov was victorious in both his singles rubbers which led to a narrow 3–2 victory over Hungary. He would then take a few breaks from Davis Cup which would result in Bulgaria being relegated back to the lowest division of Davis Cup.

Dimitrov would return to Davis Cup competition in 2012 as a top 100 player. The Bulgarians breezed through the round-robin tournament held in their home city of Sofia and would once again be promoted to the second division of the Europe/Africa zone. Dimitrov and the Bulgarian Davis Cup team have been unable to advance past the first round since being promoted but have been victorious in their two relegation ties.

=== Olympics ===
Dimitrov represented Bulgaria at his maiden Olympics in 2012 London. He competed in the singles competition and advanced past the first round with a straight sets victory over Poland's Łukasz Kubot. He was then beaten by France's 12th seed Gilles Simon. Dimitrov made his second Olympic appearance in 2016 Rio where he was beaten in the first round of the singles competition by Croatian Marin Čilić.

Dimitrov skipped the 2020 Tokyo Olympics and registered to play at the ATP 250 tournament in Atlanta instead but later withdrew, as he did not meet the minimal qualifications requirements due to non-representation in the Davis Cup.

== Coaching ==
As a child, Dimitrov was coached by his father, Dimitar, at Tennis Club Haskovo. As his talent became more apparent he started to receive coaching from abroad, most notably from Spaniard Pato Alvarez, who has also coached Britain's Andy Murray. Alvarez has reportedly said that Dimitrov is the best 17 year old he has coached. Around the time of his success at the 2009 Rotterdam Open, Dimitrov formally began a coaching relationship with Peter Lundgren, former coach of world No. 1s Marat Safin and Roger Federer. Lundgren has also been quick to praise Dimitrov, saying that "he is better than Federer was at his age."

In June 2010, Dimitrov ended his coaching relationship with Lundgren and was subsequently coached by Australian pro Peter McNamara. Dimitrov and McNamara have ended their coaching relationship at the end of the 2011 season. In 2012, Dimitrov was coached by Patrick Mouratoglou in an attempt to revive his fortunes. On 26 November 2012, Dimitrov left the Patrick Mouratoglou Academy and joined the Good to Great Tennis Academy in Sweden, which is run by ex-touring pros Magnus Norman, Nicklas Kulti, and Mikael Tillström.

On 7 October 2013, Dimitrov announced on his Facebook page that he has hired Roger Rasheed (former coach of Gaël Monfils, Jo-Wilifred Tsonga and Lleyton Hewitt) to be his new coach. On 7 July 2015 Dimitrov announced via Twitter that he would be parting ways with coach Roger Rasheed. On 25 September 2015, Dimitrov announced he had hired Juan Martín del Potro's former coach Franco Davín, but they parted ways in the first half of 2016.

Since July 2016, Dimitrov has been coached by Daniel Vallverdu, a former coach of Andy Murray, during which tenure Murray won two Grand Slam titles. Dimitrov has credited Vallverdu with his upturn in form during the 2017 season and has mentioned several times during interviews and during his thank you speech, following his win of the 2017 ATP Finals, that he is very thankful for his success to his coaching team and particularly Vallverdu. Dimitrov also stated numerous times through the season, that Valverdu changed his mentality towards the game and is the main factor for the way he plays against top ten players. On 7 May 2019, Dimitrov declared that he and Vallverdu had parted ways following a string of unsuccessful tournament participations.

Since 3 January 2021, Dimitrov was coached by Dante Bottini. Dante Bottini replaced the German coach Christian Groh, with whom Dimitrov worked during 2020. The most serious successes of the new coach are linked to Japanese Kei Nishikori, who managed to climb to number 4 in the world rankings under his guidance. He split with Bottini in September 2022.

In October 2022, after parting ways with Wawrinka, Vallverdu agreed to coach Dimitrov again till the end of the 2022 season which ended in November 2022. On 1 December 2022, it was confirmed he will work with Dimitrov also in 2023. Vallverdu and Dimitrov split for a second time in December 2025.

At the end of May 2026 Dimitrov rehired coach Jamie Delgado with whom he split in September 2025 after working for three years together.

== Playing style ==
Dimitrov employs an all-round style of playing, and is said to have one of the most unusual play styles on the Tour. His flexibility and the fact that he's comfortable on all parts of the court is the main reason why many people said during his early years that he was one of the most talented up-and-coming players. Dimitrov is known for his hustle, athleticism, fluid style of play and exceptional shot-making.

Dimitrov employs an eastern to semi-western grip on his forehand, somewhat similar to that of Roger Federer. His forehand is known to be very heavy, powerful and accurate and is his primary weapon. He uses it to generate sudden pace in baseline rallies, often catching his opponents off guard. Dimitrov employs a conventional single-handed backhand. His backhand is one of the most versatile in the game due to his ability to hit it with top-spin, flat, and his backhand slice, which John McEnroe has said is the best slice in the game. He also has a slightly unusual follow-through and finish on his backhand, often straightening out his hand and extending it all the way across his waist, which some have said is a weakness due to the time taken to recover by recoiling his arm. Dimitrov usually uses his backhand as a rally stroke to build up points rather than hit immediate winners, although he is known to be able to generate significant pace on his backhand when returning a weak shot from his opponent or when neutralising a fast-paced shot. He has displayed this ability more than 50 times alone in his semi-final against Rafael Nadal on the Australian Open 2017.

Dimitrov has a solid fast serve, often reaching 210 km/h, (130 mph) up to 220 km/h (140 mph). His first serve has been known to be pivotal, often producing aces on important points. Dimitrov employs more top-spin on his second serve, making it slower but more consistent. In 2017 however he had a big problem with double faults as he made 254 of them (around 40 more than 2016), although he made his best season so far.

One aspect of Dimitrov's game that has been widely praised is his variety and flexibility. He is comfortable playing on all areas of the court, having solid ground strokes and exceptional touch at the net. He also employs aggressive drop shots to catch opponents off guard and is even known to frequently use fakes, especially on the forehand side, to fake drop shots instead of fast ground strokes, wrongfooting opponents. His speed and athleticism are also exceptional, as is famous for using slide, sometimes even to the point of splitting, to reach balls. He also occasionally dives to reach balls, one of the most famous occasions being his second round match at the Monte-Carlo Masters against Janko Tipsarević, in which he dove to hit a drop-shot, winning him the point. His all-round play has had many commentators and past players call him "classy" and "stylish".

Dimitrov is also noted as one of the only players on the tour who can consistently produce trick shots, alongside Gaël Monfils, Dustin Brown, Nick Kyrgios and Roger Federer. He has been known to hit a variety of trick shots and unorthodox shots, such as the tweener. Sometimes, he does it for entertainment purposes, eventually losing the point. Some of his most famous trick shots include his behind the back drop-shot against Viktor Troicki in the Swiss Indoors 2012 and his successive between-the-leg shots off Jack Sock's returns in the Stockholm Open 2014. Both shots were considered among the best trick shots ever, with the former considered the shot of the year in 2012.

Early in his career, Dimitrov was compared to Roger Federer due to their similarity in play style and actions, notably his forehand, backhand and serve, earning him the nickname "Baby Fed". Over the years he has attempted to shed this title and has had people appreciate his own style. Dimitrov has won one of his eight meetings with Federer, at the US Open 2019.

== Equipment ==
As of 2013, Dimitrov uses a customized Wilson mid-size 93 square inches prototype racket provided by the Wilson Pro Room Team (as disclosed by pro tour stringers such as the Priority One team members), cosmetic on it is the Pro Staff 95 BLX, it is weighted about 12.oz strung with a 16X19 string pattern. In 2014, he switched to 18X17 string pattern. From 2015 and on, he switched to a 97 square inches head size, similar to Federer's frame but with a 18X17 pattern. In 2016, he worked with Wilson Pro Room Team to come up with the model now known as the Pro Staff 97S with a thinner beam width of 19.5mm. From the start of his adult career in 2010, he was sponsored by Nike wearing the brand apparel and the Nike Air Zoom Vapor Pro, he previously wore the Air Zoom Vapor X which was also Federer's shoe of choice until 2021. From the 2023 French Open onwards, Dimitrov became an ambassador for Lacoste. At the start of 2025, Dimitrov started partnership with Adidas providing him new tennis footwear the Adizero Ubersonic 5.

== Endorsements and sponsorships ==
Dimitrov's professional endorsement agreements include Nike, Wilson Sporting Goods and in 2023 concluded a deal with Lacoste Apparel Products and Lacoste Accessories. In 2024 Grigor became the Global brand ambassador for Payhawk, a global spend management software provider.

Historically he has acted as a brand ambassador to Rolex, Haagen Dazs, American Express, Jet Smarter, Vitamin Well, Creed and Telenor and in 2023 entered into multilevel partnership agreement with Bianchet.

== Honours and awards ==
Best young tennis player in Bulgaria – 2005

Bulgarian Sportsperson of the Year – 2014, 2017

Sports Icarus Award — 2014, 2017

Balkan Athlete of the Year — 2017

- Won – ATP Stefan Edberg Sportsmanship Award (2024)

== Career statistics ==
=== Grand Slam tournament performance timeline ===
Key
W	F	SF	QF	#R	RR	Q#	DNQ	A	NH

(W) winner; (F) finalist; (SF) semifinalist; (QF) quarterfinalist; (#R) rounds 4, 3, 2, 1; (RR) round-robin stage; (Q#) qualification round; (DNQ) did not qualify; (A) absent; (NH) not held; (SR) strike rate (events won / competed); (W–L) win–loss record.
To avoid confusion and double counting, these charts are updated at the conclusion of a tournament or when the player's participation has ended.

Current through the 2026 US Open.

Tournament	2009	2010	2011	2012	2013	2014	2015	2016	2017	2018	2019	2020	2021	2022	2023	2024	2025	2026	SR	W–L	Win%
Australian Open	A	Q1	2R	2R	1R	QF	4R	3R	SF	QF	4R	2R	QF	2R	3R	3R	1R	1R	0 / 16	33–16	69%
French Open	A	A	1R	2R	3R	1R	1R	1R	3R	3R	3R	4R	1R	3R	4R	QF	1R	Q1	0 / 15	21–15	58%
Wimbledon	1R	A	2R	2R	2R	SF	3R	3R	4R	1R	1R	NH	2R	1R	4R	4R	4R	4R	0 / 16	28–16	64%
US Open	Q2	A	1R	1R	1R	4R	2R	4R	2R	1R	SF	2R	2R	2R	3R	QF	A	1R	0 / 15	21–15	58%
Win–loss	0–1	0–0	2–4	3–4	3–4	12–4	6–4	7–4	11–4	6–4	9–4	5–3	6–4	4–4	10–4	13–4	3–3	3–3	0 / 62	103–62	62%

=== Year–end championship finals ===
==== Singles: 1 (1 title) ====
Result	Year	Tournament	Surface	Opponent	Score
Win	2017	ATP Finals, London	Hard (i)	(Belgium) David Goffin	7–5, 4–6, 6–3

=== ATP Masters 1000 tournaments ===
==== Singles: 3 (1 title, 2 runners-up) ====
Result	Year	Tournament	Surface	Opponent	Score
Win	2017	Cincinnati Open, United States	Hard	(Australia) Nick Kyrgios	6–3, 7–5
Loss	2023	Paris Masters, France	Hard (i)	(Serbia) Novak Djokovic	4–6, 3–6
Loss	2024	Miami Open, United States	Hard	(Italy) Jannik Sinner	3–6, 1–6

== Junior Grand Slam finals ==
=== Singles: 2 (2 titles) ===
Result	Year	Tournament	Surface	Opponent	Score
Win	2008	Wimbledon	Grass	(Finland) Henri Kontinen	7–5, 6–3
Win	2008	US Open	Hard	(United States) Devin Britton	6–4, 6–3

== Records ==
=== Open Era records ===
Time span	Record accomplished	Players matched
2017	Won the ATP Finals title on debut	6 others: Stan Smith, Ilie Nastase, Guillermo Vilas, John McEnroe, Alex Corretja, Stefanos Tsitsipas
2011–2025	Longest active streak of Grand Slam appearances (58)	Stands alone
2013–2024	Active player to complete the career set of both Grand Slams and Masters quarterfinals	5 others: Félix Auger-Aliassime, Novak Djokovic, Marin Čilić, Daniil Medvedev, Andrey Rublev
