= 2011 PTT Thailand Open =

- Date: September 26 – October 2
- Edition: 9th

Champions

Singles
- (United Kingdom) Andy Murray

Doubles
- (Austria) Oliver Marach / (Pakistan) Aisam-ul-Haq Qureshi
← 2010 ·	PTT Thailand Open	· 2012 →

The 2011 PTT Thailand Open was a tennis tournament played on indoor hard courts. It was the ninth edition of the Thailand Open, and was part of the ATP World Tour 250 Series of the 2011 ATP World Tour. It took place at the Impact Arena in Bangkok, Thailand, from September 26 through October 2, 2011.

== Entrants ==
=== Seeds ===
Country	Player	Rank	Seed
GBR	Andy Murray	4	1
FRA	Gaël Monfils	8	2
FRA	Gilles Simon	11	3
ESP	Guillermo García-López	35	4
CRO	Ivan Dodig	37	5
ITA	Fabio Fognini	39	6
NED	Robin Haase	42	7
ESP	Pablo Andújar	43	8

- Seeds are based on the rankings of September 19, 2011.

=== Other entrants ===
The following players received wildcards into the singles main draw:

- (Austria) Dominic Thiem
- (Thailand) Danai Udomchoke
- (Thailand) Kittipong Wachiramanowong

The following players received entry from the qualifying draw:

- (Italy) Simone Bolelli
- (Switzerland) Marco Chiudinelli
- (Australia) Greg Jones
- (Japan) Go Soeda

== Finals ==
=== Singles ===
(United Kingdom) Andy Murray defeated (United States) Donald Young, 6–2, 6–0

- It was Murray's third title of the year and 19th of his career.

=== Doubles ===
(Austria) Oliver Marach / (Pakistan) Aisam-ul-Haq Qureshi defeated (Germany) Michael Kohlmann / (Germany) Alexander Waske, 7–6^{(7–4)}, 7–6^{(7–5)}
