= 2003 French Open – Boys' singles =

Tennis tournament

Boys' singles
- 2003 French Open

Final
- Champion: (Switzerland) Stanislas Wawrinka
- Runner-up: (United States) Brian Baker
- Score: 7–5, 4–6, 6–3

Events
Singles	men	women		boys	girls
Doubles	men	women	mixed	boys	girls
WC Singles	men	women	quad
WC Doubles	men	women	quad
Legends	−45	45+	women
- French Open

In the 2003 French Open tennis tournament, the boys' singles competition was won by Stan Wawrinka of Switzerland. Wawrinka would also win the senior French Open title twelve years later.

== Seeds ==
1. (Cyprus) Marcos Baghdatis (quarterfinals)
2. (Spain) Nicolás Almagro (semifinals)
3. (Israel) Dudi Sela (quarterfinals)
4. (France) Jo-Wilfried Tsonga (semifinals)
5. (Switzerland) Stanislas Wawrinka (champion)
6. (United States) Brian Baker (final)
7. (Spain) Daniel Gimeno Traver (quarterfinals)
8. (France) Mathieu Montcourt (quarterfinals)
9. (Romania) Florin Mergea (third round)
10. (Hungary) György Balázs (third round)
11. (Brazil) Bruno Rosa (first round)
12. (Australia) Chris Guccione (second round)
13. (United States) Chris Kwon (first round)
14. (United Kingdom) Andy Murray (third round)
15. (Mexico) Luis Flores (third round)
16. (Brazil) Leonardo Kirche (second round)

== Draw ==
Key

- Q = Qualifier
- WC = Wild card
- LL = Lucky loser
- Alt = Alternate
- ITF = ITF entry
- PR = Protected ranking
- SR = Special ranking
- SE = Special exempt
- JE = Junior exempt
- JR = Junior Accelerator Programme entrant
- CO = College Accelerator Programme entrant
- NG = Next Gen Accelerator Program entrant
- w/o = Walkover
- r = Retired
- d = Defaulted

=== Final eight ===
Quarterfinals
1	(Cyprus) Marcos Baghdatis	4	5
6	(United States) Brian Baker	6	7
4	(France) Jo-Wilfried Tsonga	3	7^{9}	7
7	(Spain) Daniel Gimeno Traver	6	6^{7}	5
5	(Switzerland) Stanislas Wawrinka	6	6
3	(Israel) Dudi Sela	3	4
8	(France) Mathieu Montcourt	5	5
2	(Spain) Nicolás Almagro	7	7

Semifinals
6	(United States) Brian Baker	6	6
4	(France) Jo-Wilfried Tsonga	3	3
5	(Switzerland) Stanislas Wawrinka	6	6
2	(Spain) Nicolás Almagro	4	2

Final
6	(United States) Brian Baker	5	6	3
5	(Switzerland) Stanislas Wawrinka	7	4	6

=== Top half ===
==== Section 1 ====
First round
1	(Cyprus) Marcos Baghdatis	6	6
WC	(France) Antoine Benneteau	0	1
(Romania) Horia Tecău	4	7	5
Q	(United States) Alex Kuznetsov	6	5	7
(France) Gaël Monfils	6	7
Q	(South Africa) Fritz Wolmarans	3	5
(United States) Brendan Evans	4	5
14	(United Kingdom) Andy Murray	6	7
10	(Hungary) György Balázs	6	6
Q	(Germany) Eric Scherer	4	3
(El Salvador) Jaime Cuéllar	4	4
WC	(France) Sebastien Louis	6	6
(Czech Republic) Roman Kutáč	6	2	6
(South Korea) Kim Sun-yong	2	6	1
(Ukraine) Sergiy Stakhovsky	2	7	1
6	(United States) Brian Baker	6	6	6

Second round
1	(Cyprus) M Baghdatis	7	6
Q	(United States) A Kuznetsov	5	3
(France) G Monfils	4	1
14	(United Kingdom) A Murray	6	6
10	(Hungary) G Balázs	6	6
WC	(France) S Louis	4	3
(Czech Republic) R Kutáč	1	1
6	(United States) B Baker	6	6

Third round
1	(Cyprus) M Baghdatis	6	6
14	(United Kingdom) A Murray	3	1
10	(Hungary) G Balázs	7^{7}	4	1
6	(United States) B Baker	6^{5}	6	6

Quarterfinals
1	(Cyprus) M Baghdatis	4	5
6	(United States) B Baker	6	7

==== Section 2 ====
First round
4	(France) Jo-Wilfried Tsonga	7	7
(Slovakia) Kamil Čapkovič	6	6
(United States) Phillip Simmonds	3	2
LL	(Sweden) Pablo Figueroa	6	6
(Portugal) Frederico Gil	7	4	3
(United Kingdom) David Brewer	6	6	6
(India) Somdev Devvarman	1	6	4
16	(Brazil) Leonardo Kirche	6	3	6
12	(Australia) Chris Guccione	7	7
(Georgia (country)) Lado Chikhladze	6	5
Q	(Serbia and Montenegro) Novak Djokovic	7	6
Q	(Netherlands) Jesse Huta Galung	5	3
(Germany) Andreas Weber	6	6	6
WC	(France) Eddy Chala	7	4	1
(United States) Adam Fass	3	4
7	(Spain) Daniel Gimeno Traver	6	6

Second round
4	(France) J-W Tsonga	6	6
LL	(Sweden) P Figueroa	3	2
(United Kingdom) D Brewer	6	6^{5}	6
16	(Brazil) L Kirche	4	7^{7}	4
12	(Australia) C Guccione	4	7	4
Q	(Serbia and Montenegro) N Djokovic	6	5	6
(Germany) A Weber	2	2
7	(Spain) D Gimeno Traver	6	6

Third round
4	(France) J-W Tsonga	6	6
(United Kingdom) D Brewer	4	4
Q	(Serbia and Montenegro) N Djokovic	2	6	3
7	(Spain) D Gimeno Traver	6	2	6

Quarterfinals
4	(France) J-W Tsonga	3	7^{9}	7
7	(Spain) D Gimeno Traver	6	6^{7}	5

==== Section 3 ====
First round
5	(Switzerland) Stanislas Wawrinka	6	6	6
(France) Josselin Ouanna	7	2	3
Q	(Russia) Konstantin Kravchuk	6	6
(Australia) Adam Feeney	2	4
(Germany) Mischa Zverev	3	6	6
(South Korea) Suk Hyun-joon	6	3	1
(Netherlands) Romano Tatuhey	6	2	4
9	(Romania) Florin Mergea	4	6	6
13	(United States) Chris Kwon	2	1
(Slovenia) Rok Jarc	6	6
WC	(France) Julien Gely	6	6	6
Q	(Germany) Peter Steinberger	7	3	4
(The Bahamas) Devin Mullings	6	6	6
(United Kingdom) Josh Goodall	7	4	4
WC	(France) Alexis Benyahia	2	0
3	(Israel) Dudi Sela	6	6

Second round
5	(Switzerland) S Wawrinka	6	6
Q	(Russia) K Kravchuk	4	1
(Germany) M Zverev	3	7^{7}	5
9	(Romania) F Mergea	6	6^{2}	7
(Slovenia) R Jarc	4	6	3
WC	(France) J Gely	6	2	6
(The Bahamas) D Mullings	1	1
3	(Israel) D Sela	6	6

Third round
5	(Switzerland) S Wawrinka	6	6
9	(Romania) F Mergea	4	2
WC	(France) J Gely	2	4
3	(Israel) D Sela	6	6

Quarterfinals
5	(Switzerland) S Wawrinka	6	6
3	(Israel) D Sela	3	4

==== Section 4 ====
First round
8	(France) Mathieu Montcourt	6	6
(United Kingdom) Jamie Baker	2	2
(Germany) Jerome Becker	7	3	2
(Chile) Jorge Aguilar	6	6	6
Q	(Croatia) Vilim Višak	3	2
(United States) Jarrett Chirico	6	6
WC	(France) Cyril Mokaiesch	6	6
11	(Brazil) Bruno Rosa	3	3
15	(Mexico) Luis Flores	6	6
(United States) Robert Cameron	3	2
WC	(France) Jean Baptiste Robin	4	5
(Tunisia) Haithem Abid	6	7
(Romania) Adrian Ungur	6	7
WC	(France) Paterne Mamata	3	5
(El Salvador) Rafael Arévalo	3	0
2	(Spain) Nicolás Almagro	6	6

Second round
8	(France) M Montcourt	6	6
(Chile) J Aguilar	1	4
(United States) J Chirico	4	2
WC	(France) C Mokaiesch	6	6
15	(Mexico) L Flores	6	6
(Tunisia) H Abid	1	2
(Romania) A Ungur	1	6	5
2	(Spain) N Almagro	6	4	7

Third round
8	(France) M Montcourt	6	6
WC	(France) C Mokaiesch	2	4
15	(Mexico) L Flores	2	1
2	(Spain) N Almagro	6	6

Quarterfinals
8	(France) M Montcourt	5	5
2	(Spain) N Almagro	7	7
