= 2003 US Open – Boys' singles =

Boys' singles
- 2003 US Open

Final
- Champion: (France) Jo-Wilfried Tsonga
- Runner-up: (Cyprus) Marcos Baghdatis
- Score: 7–6^{(7–4)}, 6–3

Events
Singles	men	women		boys	girls
Doubles	men	women	mixed	boys	girls
WC Singles	men	women	quad
WC Doubles	men	women	quad
Legends	men	women	mixed
- US Open

Richard Gasquet was the defending champion, but did not compete in the juniors that year.

Jo-Wilfried Tsonga won the tournament, defeating Marcos Baghdatis in the final, 7–6^{(7–4)}, 6–3.

== Seeds ==
1. (Cyprus) Marcos Baghdatis (final)
2. (Romania) Florin Mergea (semifinals)
3. (United States) Brian Baker (quarterfinals)
4. (Israel) Dudi Sela (semifinals)
5. (France) Jo-Wilfried Tsonga (champion)
6. (Spain) Daniel Gimeno-Traver (third round)
7. (France) Mathieu Montcourt (quarterfinals)
8. (Australia) Chris Guccione (third round)
9. (Germany) Sebastian Rieschick (third round)
10. (United States) Chris Kwon (first round)
11. (Brazil) Bruno Rosa (second round)
12. (United Kingdom) Andy Murray (quarterfinals)
13. (Portugal) Fred Gil (third round)
14. (Mexico) Luis-Manuel Flores (third round)
15. (Brazil) Leonardo Kirche (second round)
16. (South Korea) Suk Hyun-joon (second round)

== Draw ==
Key

- Q = Qualifier
- WC = Wild card
- LL = Lucky loser
- Alt = Alternate
- ITF = ITF entry
- PR = Protected ranking
- SR = Special ranking
- SE = Special exempt
- JE = Junior exempt
- JR = Junior Accelerator Programme entrant
- CO = College Accelerator Programme entrant
- NG = Next Gen Accelerator Program entrant
- w/o = Walkover
- r = Retired
- d = Defaulted

=== Finals ===
Quarterfinals
1	(Cyprus) Marcos Baghdatis	6	7^{7}
WC	(United States) Scoville Jenkins	1	6^{4}
4	(Israel) Dudi Sela	6	3	6
7	(France) Mathieu Montcourt	4	6	4
5	(France) Jo-Wilfried Tsonga	6	7^{7}
3	(United States) Brian Baker	3	6^{2}
12	(United Kingdom) Andy Murray	1	5
2	(Romania) Florin Mergea	6	7

Semifinals
1	(Cyprus) Marcos Baghdatis	6	6
4	(Israel) Dudi Sela	2	1
5	(France) Jo-Wilfried Tsonga	6	6
2	(Romania) Florin Mergea	4	4

Final
1	(Cyprus) Marcos Baghdatis	6^{4}	3
5	(France) Jo-Wilfried Tsonga	7^{7}	6

=== Top half ===
==== Section 1 ====
First round
1	(Cyprus) Marcos Baghdatis	4	6	7^{7}
(Australia) Adam Feeney	6	3	6^{1}
(Germany) Mischa Zverev	6	6
(United States) Robert Cameron	2	2
(France) Julien Gely	1	6	6
(United Kingdom) Jamie Baker	6	4	2
(India) Somdev Devvarman	7^{7}	6^{5}	5
13	(Portugal) Fred Gil	6^{2}	7^{7}	7
11	(Brazil) Bruno Rosa	6	6^{6}	6
(El Salvador) Jaime Cuellar	3	7^{8}	1
Q	(Russia) Konstantin Kravchuk	4	6	2
WC	(United States) Scoville Jenkins	6	4	6
(United States) Brendan Evans	5	6	6
(New Zealand) G.D. Jones	7	3	4
Q	(United States) Ruben Gonzales	4	4
6	(Spain) Daniel Gimeno-Traver	6	6

Second round
1	(Cyprus) M Baghdatis	6	6
(Germany) M Zverev	1	2
(France) J Gely	3	6	4
13	(Portugal) F Gil	6	1	6
11	(Brazil) B Rosa	3	2
WC	(United States) S Jenkins	6	6
(United States) B Evans	6	4	3
6	(Spain) D Gimeno-Traver	3	6	6

Third round
1	(Cyprus) M Baghdatis	6	6
13	(Portugal) F Gil	4	0
WC	(United States) S Jenkins	4	6	7
6	(Spain) D Gimeno-Traver	6	1	5

Quarterfinals
1	(Cyprus) M Baghdatis	6	7^{7}
WC	(United States) S Jenkins	1	6^{4}

==== Section 2 ====
First round
4	(Israel) Dudi Sela	6	6
LL	(Germany) Eric Scherer	3	3
Q	(Argentina) Horacio Zeballos	7^{7}	6
WC	(South Africa) Gary Sacks	6^{4}	4
(Australia) Robert Smeets	6	7^{7}
(Serbia and Montenegro) Novak Djokovic	4	6^{3}
(India) Divij Sharan	6	4	4
16	(South Korea) Suk Hyun-joon	4	6	6
10	(United States) Chris Kwon	6^{2}	5^{r}
(Germany) Jerome Becker	7^{7}	5
(South Africa) Fritz Wolmarans	6	6
(Aruba) Jose-Luis Muguruza	2	1
WC	(United States) Michael Shabaz	1	4
(United States) Alex Kuznetsov	6	6
(Morocco) Mehdi Ziadi	2	4
7	(France) Mathieu Montcourt	6	6

Second round
4	(Israel) D Sela	6	6
Q	(Argentina) H Zeballos	1	2
(Australia) R Smeets	6	6
16	(South Korea) H-j Suk	1	1
(Germany) J Becker	6	6^{4}	4
(South Africa) F Wolmarans	2	7^{7}	6
(United States) A Kuznetsov	6	4	3
7	(France) M Montcourt	3	6	6

Third round
4	(Israel) D Sela	6	6
(Australia) R Smeets	3	2
(South Africa) F Wolmarans	5	4
7	(France) M Montcourt	7	6

Quarterfinals
4	(Israel) D Sela	6	3	6
7	(France) M Montcourt	4	6	4

=== Bottom half ===
==== Section 3 ====
First round
5	(France) Jo-Wilfried Tsonga	6	4	6
WC	(United States) Denis Zivkovic	3	6	4
(Georgia (country)) Lado Chikhladze	6^{3}	6^{7}
(United Kingdom) Josh Goodall	7^{7}	7^{9}
(United States) Nestor Briceno	4	3
WC	(United States) Vahid Mirzadeh	6	6
(South Korea) Kim Sun-yong	2	2
9	(Germany) Sebastian Rieschick	6	6
14	(Mexico) Luis-Manuel Flores	6	6
WC	(United States) Timothy Neilly	0	4
WC	(United States) Robert Yim	6	6
Q	(Italy) Fabio Fognini	0	3
Q	(France) Gaël Monfils	6	6
Q	(United Kingdom) Miles Kasiri	4	2
(Argentina) Juan-Pablo Amado	1	1
3	(United States) Brian Baker	6	6

Second round
5	(France) J-W Tsonga	6	6
(United Kingdom) J Goodall	3	4
WC	(United States) V Mirzadeh	1	0
9	(Germany) S Rieschick	6	6
14	(Mexico) L-M Flores	7^{7}	1	6
WC	(United States) R Yim	6^{4}	6	1
Q	(France) G Monfils	4	2
3	(United States) B Baker	6	6

Third round
5	(France) J-W Tsonga	7^{7}	6
9	(Germany) S Rieschick	6^{2}	4
14	(Mexico) L-M Flores	6	4	4
3	(United States) B Baker	4	6	6

Quarterfinals
5	(France) J-W Tsonga	6	7^{7}
3	(United States) B Baker	3	6^{2}

==== Section 4 ====
First round
8	(Australia) Chris Guccione	6	5	7^{11}
(Netherlands) Romano Tatuhey	4	7	6^{9}
(Germany) Matthias Wellermann	3	6	4
(France) Josselin Ouanna	6	4	6
(United States) Scott Oudsema	6	6
(Germany) Aleksey Malajko	4	1
Q	(United States) Phillip Simmonds	7^{9}	4	3
12	(United Kingdom) Andy Murray	6^{7}	6	6
15	(Brazil) Leonardo Kirche	6	4	6
(The Bahamas) Devin Mullings	3	6	1
WC	(United States) Jamil Al Agba	2	7^{7}	6
Q	(Netherlands) Jesse Huta Galung	6	6^{5}	2
(United States) Adam Fass	6	4	6
(India) Karan Rastogi	3	6	0
(El Salvador) Rafael Arévalo	2	0
2	(Romania) Florin Mergea	6	6

Second round
8	(Australia) C Guccione	7^{13}	6
(France) J Ouanna	6^{11}	4
(United States) S Oudsema	4	4
12	(United Kingdom) A Murray	6	6
15	(Brazil) L Kirche	4	4
WC	(United States) J Al Agba	6	6
(United States) A Fass	5	1
2	(Romania) F Mergea	7	6

Third round
8	(Australia) C Guccione	6^{4}	6	2
12	(United Kingdom) A Murray	7^{7}	4	6
WC	(United States) J Al Agba	1	6	3
2	(Romania) F Mergea	6	3	6

Quarterfinals
12	(United Kingdom) A Murray	1	5
2	(Romania) F Mergea	6	7

== Sources ==
- Draw
