= 2003 Wimbledon Championships – Boys' singles =

Boys' singles
- 2003 Wimbledon Championships

Final
- Champion: (Romania) Florin Mergea
- Runner-up: (Australia) Chris Guccione
- Score: 6–2, 7–6^{(7–3)}

Details
- Draw: 64 (8 Q / 7 WC )
- Seeds: 16

Events
Singles	men	women		boys	girls
Doubles	men	women	mixed	boys	girls
WC Singles	men	women	quad
WC Doubles	men	women	quad
Legends	men	women	seniors
← 2002 ·	Wimbledon Championships	· 2004 →

Todd Reid was the defending champion, but did not complete in the Juniors this year.

Florin Mergea defeated Chris Guccione in the final, 6–2, 7–6^{(7–3)} to win the boys' singles tennis title at the 2003 Wimbledon Championships.

== Seeds ==
1. (Czech Republic) Tomáš Berdych (quarterfinals)
2. (United States) Brian Baker (quarterfinals)
3. (Israel) Dudi Sela (second round)
4. (France) Mathieu Montcourt (second round)
5. (Hungary) György Balázs (first round)
6. (Romania) Florin Mergea (champion)
7. (France) Jo-Wilfried Tsonga (semifinals)
8. (Australia) Chris Guccione (final)
9. (Spain) Daniel Gimeno Traver (first round)
10. (United Kingdom) Andy Murray (first round)
11. (Brazil) Bruno Rosa (first round)
12. (United States) Chris Kwon (third round)
13. (Brazil) Leonardo Kirche (first round)
14. (South Korea) Suk Hyun-joon (second round)
15. (Portugal) Frederico Gil (third round)
16. (United Kingdom) David Brewer (second round)

Click on the seed number of a player to go to their draw section.

== Draw ==
=== Key ===
- Q = Qualifier
- WC = Wild card
- LL = Lucky loser
- Alt = Alternate
- SE = Special exempt
- PR = Protected ranking
- ITF = ITF entry
- JE = Junior exempt
- w/o = Walkover
- r = Retired
- d = Defaulted
- SR = Special ranking

=== Finals ===
Quarterfinals
1	(Czech Republic) Tomáš Berdych	6^{5}	6^{5}
6	(Romania) Florin Mergea	7^{7}	7^{7}
(Mexico) Luis-Manuel Flores	2	4
7	(France) Jo-Wilfried Tsonga	6	6
(Romania) Horia Tecău	6	6^{4}	6
(United States) Brendan Evans	4	7^{7}	1
8	(Australia) Chris Guccione	7^{7}	7
2	(United States) Brian Baker	6^{3}	5

Semifinals
6	(Romania) Florin Mergea	6	6^{5}	6
7	(France) Jo-Wilfried Tsonga	4	7^{7}	4
(Romania) Horia Tecău	3	4
(Australia) Chris Guccione	6	6

Final
6	(Romania) Florin Mergea	6	7^{7}
(Australia) Chris Guccione	2	6^{3}

=== Top half ===
==== Section 1 ====
First round
1	(Czech Republic) Tomáš Berdych	7	6
(Germany) Andreas Weber	5	4
(Australia) Adam Feeney	6	7
(France) Josselin Ouanna	3	5
(El Salvador) Jaime Cuellar	6^{5}	5
(United Kingdom) Josh Goodall	7^{7}	7
Q	(United States) Alex Kuznetsov	7^{7}	6^{2}	4
14	(South Korea) Suk Hyun-joon	6^{5}	7^{7}	6
11	(Brazil) Bruno Rosa	6	7
(United States) Scott Oudsema	4	5
(Aruba) José Luis Muguruza	2	2
WC	(United Kingdom) Miles Kasiri	6	6
(Argentina) Juan-Pablo Amado	4	6	6
(Netherlands) Romano Tatuhey	6	3	3
Q	(Germany) Daniel Müller	6^{3}	1
6	(Romania) Florin Mergea	7^{7}	6

Second round
1	(Czech Republic) T Berdych	6	6
(Australia) A Feeney	4	1
(United Kingdom) J Goodall	6	7^{7}
14	(South Korea) H-j Suk	1	6^{5}
11	(Brazil) B Rosa	6	6
WC	(United Kingdom) M Kasiri	3	2
(Argentina) J-P Amado	2	6^{5}
6	(Romania) F Mergea	6	7^{7}

Third round
1	(Czech Republic) T Berdych	6	6
(United Kingdom) J Goodall	2	3
11	(Brazil) B Rosa	2	3
6	(Romania) F Mergea	6	6

Quarterfinals
1	(Czech Republic) T Berdych	6^{5}	6^{5}
6	(Romania) F Mergea	7^{7}	7^{7}

==== Section 2 ====
First round
3	(Israel) Dudi Sela	6	3	6
(India) Karan Rastogi	2	6	3
(Slovenia) Rok Jarc	5	4
(Germany) Mischa Zverev	7	6
(Georgia (country)) Lado Chikhladze	3	6	5
(Mexico) Luis-Manuel Flores	6	3	7
WC	(United States) Adam Fass	2	2
16	(United Kingdom) David Brewer	6	6
12	(United States) Chris Kwon	4	6	6
(United States) Jarrett Chirico	6	3	4
Q	(Russia) Konstantin Kravchuk	7^{7}	6
(Romania) Adrian Ungur	6^{1}	1
WC	(United Kingdom) Guy Thomas	3	6
(Tunisia) Haythem Abid	6	7
WC	(United Kingdom) Tom Burn	6^{5}	5
7	(France) Jo-Wilfried Tsonga	7^{7}	7

Second round
3	(Israel) D Sela	4	4
(Germany) M Zverev	6	6
(Mexico) L-M Flores	6	6
16	(United Kingdom) D Brewer	2	4
12	(United States) C Kwon	6	6
Q	(Russia) K Kravchuk	3	3
(Tunisia) H Abid	2	4
7	(France) J-W Tsonga	6	6

Third round
(Germany) M Zverev	6^{8}	6	3
(Mexico) L-M Flores	7^{10}	3	6
12	(United States) C Kwon	1	6^{5}
7	(France) J-W Tsonga	6	7^{7}

Quarterfinals
(Mexico) L-M Flores	2	4
7	(France) J-W Tsonga	6	6

=== Bottom half ===
==== Section 3 ====
First round
5	(Hungary) György Balázs	4	2
(Romania) Horia Tecău	6	6
(The Bahamas) Devin Mullings	7^{7}	5	6
(India) Somdev Devvarman	6^{3}	7	1
Q	(Australia) Robert Smeets	6	6
(United States) Phillip Simmonds	4	3
Q	(Germany) Peter Steinberger	6	6
10	(United Kingdom) Andy Murray	4	4
15	(Portugal) Frederico Gil	4	7^{7}	6
Q	(United Kingdom) Ross Hutchins	6	6^{5}	4
Q	(United Kingdom) Mat Lowe	6	6^{2}	6
(Croatia) Tomislav Hadžić	4	7^{7}	3
(United States) Brendan Evans	6	7^{7}
WC	(United Kingdom) Richard Irwin	1	6^{3}
(South Korea) Kim Sun-yong	3	4
4	(France) Mathieu Montcourt	6	6

Second round
(Romania) H Tecău	6	7
(The Bahamas) D Mullings	3	5
Q	(Australia) R Smeets	6	6
Q	(Germany) P Steinberger	3	0
15	(Portugal) F Gil	6	7^{7}
(United Kingdom) M Lowe	2	6^{4}
(United States) B Evans	7^{9}	6
4	(France) M Montcourt	6^{7}	4

Third round
(Romania) H Tecău	6	6
Q	(Australia) R Smeets	4	4
15	(Portugal) F Gil	1	2
(United States) B Evans	6	6

Quarterfinals
(Romania) H Tecău	6	6^{4}	6
(United States) B Evans	4	7^{7}	1

==== Section 4 ====
First round
8	(Australia) Chris Guccione	6	6
(El Salvador) Rafael Arévalo	3	4
(Sweden) Pablo Figueroa	6	6
WC	(United Kingdom) Matthew Brown	3	2
(United States) Robert Cameron	1	0
(Germany) Sebastian Rieschick	6	6
(France) Gaël Monfils	2	6	6
9	(Spain) Daniel Gimeno Traver	6	3	2
13	(Brazil) Leonardo Kirche	6^{1}	3
(United Kingdom) Jamie Baker	7^{7}	6
Q	(United States) Denis Zivkovic	7^{7}	4	5
(Netherlands) Jesse Huta Galung	6^{5}	6	7
(Italy) Fabio Fognini	5	6	1
WC	(South Africa) Fritz Wolmarans	7	4	6
(Ukraine) Sergiy Stakhovsky	6	4	2
2	(United States) Brian Baker	2	6	6

Second round
8	(Australia) C Guccione	6	6
(Sweden) P Figueroa	3	2
(Germany) S Rieschick	7	3	10
(France) G Monfils	5	6	8
(United Kingdom) J Baker	3	2
(Netherlands) J Huta Galung	6	6
(South Africa) F Wolmarans	5	6	3
2	(United States) B Baker	7	4	6

Third round
8	(Australia) C Guccione	6	6
(Germany) S Rieschick	3	4
(Netherlands) J Huta Galung	2	2
2	(United States) B Baker	6	6

Quarterfinals
8	(Australia) C Guccione	7^{7}	7
2	(United States) B Baker	6^{3}	5
