= 2014 Rogers Cup – Men's singles =

Men's singles
- 2014 Rogers Cup

Final
- Champion: (France) Jo-Wilfried Tsonga
- Runner-up: (Switzerland) Roger Federer
- Score: 7–5, 7–6^{(7–3)}

Events
| Singles | men | women |
| Doubles | men | women |
| ← 2013 · | Rogers Cup | · 2015 → |

Jo-Wilfried Tsonga defeated Roger Federer in the final, 7–5, 7–6^{(7–3)} to win the men's singles tennis title at the 2014 Canadian Open. Tsonga became the first man to defeat Novak Djokovic, Andy Murray, and Federer in the same tournament since Rafael Nadal at the 2008 Hamburg Masters.

Rafael Nadal was the reigning champion, but withdrew due to a right-wrist injury.

== Seeds ==
The top eight seeds receive a bye into the second round.

1. (Serbia) Novak Djokovic (third round)
2. (Switzerland) Roger Federer (final)
3. (Switzerland) Stan Wawrinka (third round)
4. (Czech Republic) Tomáš Berdych (third round)
5. (Spain) David Ferrer (quarterfinals)
6. (Canada) Milos Raonic (quarterfinals)
7. (Bulgaria) Grigor Dimitrov (semifinals)
8. (United Kingdom) Andy Murray (quarterfinals)
9. (Japan) ~~Kei Nishikori~~ (withdrew because of a right foot injury)
10. (United States) John Isner (first round)
11. (Latvia) Ernests Gulbis (second round)
12. (France) Richard Gasquet (third round, withdrew because of an abdominal strain)
13. (France) Jo-Wilfried Tsonga (champion)
14. (Spain) Roberto Bautista Agut (first round)
15. (Croatia) Marin Čilić (third round)
16. (Italy) Fabio Fognini (second round)
17. (Spain) Tommy Robredo (third round)

Click on the seed number of a player to go to their draw section.

== Draw ==
=== Key ===
- Q = Qualifier
- WC = Wild card
- LL = Lucky loser
- Alt = Alternate
- SE = Special exempt
- PR = Protected ranking
- ITF = ITF entry
- JE = Junior exempt
- w/o = Walkover
- r = Retired
- d = Defaulted
- SR = Special ranking

=== Finals ===
Quarterfinals
13 | (France) Jo-Wilfried Tsonga | 7^{7} | 4 | 6
8 | (United Kingdom) Andy Murray | 6^{5} | 6 | 4
(South Africa) Kevin Anderson | 7 | 5 | 6^{6}
7 | (Bulgaria) Grigor Dimitrov | 5 | 7 | 7^{8}
6 | (Canada) Milos Raonic | 4 | 7^{7} | 3
(Spain) Feliciano López | 6 | 6^{5} | 6
5 | (Spain) David Ferrer | 3 | 6 | 3
2 | (Switzerland) Roger Federer | 6 | 4 | 6

Semifinals
13 | (France) Jo-Wilfried Tsonga | 6 | 6
7 | (Bulgaria) Grigor Dimitrov | 4 | 3
(Spain) Feliciano López | 3 | 4
2 | (Switzerland) Roger Federer | 6 | 6

Final
13 | (France) Jo-Wilfried Tsonga | 7 | 7^{7}
2 | (Switzerland) Roger Federer | 5 | 6^{3}

=== Top half ===
==== Section 1 ====
First round
(Czech Republic) R Štěpánek | 3 | 5
(France) G Monfils | 6 | 7
(France) J Chardy | 6 | 5 | 6
(Argentina) F Delbonis | 3 | 7 | 4
(France) É Roger-Vasselin | 6^{3} | 1
13 | (France) J-W Tsonga | 7^{7} | 6
12 | (France) R Gasquet | 7 | 7
(Canada) V Pospisil | 5 | 5
(Croatia) I Karlović | 3 | 7^{7} | 7^{8}
Q | (Australia) B Tomic | 6 | 6^{5} | 6^{6}
(Colombia) S Giraldo | 6^{3} | 5
WC | (Australia) N Kyrgios | 7^{7} | 7

Second round
1 | (Serbia) N Djokovic | 6 | 6^{4} | 7^{7}
(France) G Monfils | 2 | 7^{7} | 6^{2}
(France) J Chardy | 6^{6} | 4
13 | (France) J-W Tsonga | 7^{8} | 6
12 | (France) R Gasquet | 5 | 7^{7} | 6
(Croatia) I Karlović | 7 | 6^{5} | 3
WC | (Australia) N Kyrgios | 2 | 2
8 | (United Kingdom) A Murray | 6 | 6

Third round
1 | (Serbia) N Djokovic | 2 | 2
13 | (France) J-W Tsonga | 6 | 6
12 | (France) R Gasquet
8 | (United Kingdom) A Murray | w/o

Quarterfinals
13 | (France) J-W Tsonga | 7^{7} | 4 | 6
8 | (United Kingdom) A Murray | 6^{5} | 6 | 4

==== Section 2 ====
First round
Q | (France) B Paire | 6^{3} | 6 | 6
(Colombia) A Falla | 7^{7} | 4 | 2
(South Africa) K Anderson | 4 | 6 | 6
Q | (Australia) T Kokkinakis | 6 | 2 | 3
(Russia) M Youzhny | 4 | 3
16 | (Italy) F Fognini | 6 | 6
17 | (Spain) T Robredo | 6 | 7^{7}
(Germany) P Kohlschreiber | 3 | 6^{3}
(France) G Simon | 3 | 6 | 6
(Austria) D Thiem | 6 | 4 | 0
SE | (United States) D Young | 5 | 6 | 6
WC | (Canada) F Dancevic | 7 | 0 | 3

Second round
3 | (Switzerland) S Wawrinka | 4 | 6 | 7^{7}
Q | (France) B Paire | 6 | 3 | 6^{2}
(South Africa) K Anderson | 7 | 6
16 | (Italy) F Fognini | 5 | 2
17 | (Spain) T Robredo | 7 | 6
(France) G Simon | 5 | 4
SE | (United States) D Young | 6 | 2 | 3
7 | (Bulgaria) G Dimitrov | 4 | 6 | 6

Third round
3 | (Switzerland) S Wawrinka | 6^{8} | 5
(South Africa) K Anderson | 7^{10} | 7
17 | (Spain) T Robredo | 5 | 7 | 4
7 | (Bulgaria) G Dimitrov | 7 | 5 | 6

Quarterfinals
(South Africa) K Anderson | 7 | 5 | 6^{6}
7 | (Bulgaria) G Dimitrov | 5 | 7 | 7^{8}

=== Bottom half ===
==== Section 3 ====
First round
WC | (United States) J Sock | 6 | 6
(Austria) J Melzer | 1 | 3
(Australia) L Hewitt | 1 | 2
(France) J Benneteau | 6 | 6
(Portugal) J Sousa | 3 | 4
11 | (Latvia) E Gulbis | 6 | 6
14 | (Spain) R Bautista Agut | 6^{7} | 3
(Spain) F López | 7^{9} | 6
Q | (United States) T Smyczek | 6 | 6
Q | (Germany) T Kamke | 3 | 2
(Chinese Taipei) Y-h Lu | 7^{8} | 7
(Spain) M Granollers | 6^{6} | 5

Second round
6 | (Canada) M Raonic | 4 | 7^{7} | 7^{7}
WC | (United States) J Sock | 6 | 6^{2} | 6^{4}
(France) J Benneteau | 7^{7} | 6
11 | (Latvia) E Gulbis | 6^{4} | 3
(Spain) F López | 7 | 6
Q | (United States) T Smyczek | 5 | 4
(Chinese Taipei) Y-h Lu | 7^{7} | 4 | 4
4 | (Czech Republic) T Berdych | 6^{4} | 6 | 6

Third round
6 | (Canada) M Raonic | 6 | 4 | 6
(France) J Benneteau | 3 | 6 | 4
(Spain) F López | 3 | 6 | 6
4 | (Czech Republic) T Berdych | 6 | 3 | 4

Quarterfinals
6 | (Canada) M Raonic | 4 | 7^{7} | 3
(Spain) F López | 6 | 6^{5} | 6

==== Section 4 ====
First round
(France) N Mahut | 3 | 3
Q | (United States) M Russell | 6 | 6
(Italy) A Seppi | 6 | 6
Q | (Canada) B Schnur | 3 | 3
(Croatia) I Dodig | 6 | 6^{4} | 6
10 | (United States) J Isner | 4 | 7^{7} | 3
15 | (Croatia) M Čilić | 6 | 4 | 7
(Uzbekistan) D Istomin | 2 | 6 | 5
(Spain) G García López | 4 | 6^{6}
LL | (Tunisia) M Jaziri | 6 | 7^{8}
WC | (Canada) P Polansky | 7^{7} | 6
(Poland) J Janowicz | 6^{5} | 4

Second round
5 | (Spain) D Ferrer | 6 | 2 | 6
Q | (United States) M Russell | 4 | 6 | 1
(Italy) A Seppi | 4 | 6 | 6^{5}
(Croatia) I Dodig | 6 | 3 | 7^{7}
15 | (Croatia) M Čilić | 4 | 6 | 7^{7}
LL | (Tunisia) M Jaziri | 6 | 0 | 6^{4}
WC | (Canada) P Polansky | 2 | 0
2 | (Switzerland) R Federer | 6 | 6

Third round
5 | (Spain) D Ferrer | 1 | 6 | 6
(Croatia) I Dodig | 6 | 3 | 3
15 | (Croatia) M Čilić | 6^{5} | 7^{7} | 4
2 | (Switzerland) R Federer | 7^{7} | 6^{3} | 6

Quarterfinals
5 | (Spain) D Ferrer | 3 | 6 | 3
2 | (Switzerland) R Federer | 6 | 4 | 6

== Qualifying ==
=== Seeds ===
1. (Australia) Marinko Matosevic (qualifying competition, retired, ~~lucky loser~~)
2. (Germany) Benjamin Becker (first round)
3. (Australia) Bernard Tomic (qualified)
4. (Germany) Tobias Kamke (qualified)
5. (Australia) Matthew Ebden (first round)
6. (France) Benoît Paire (qualified)
7. (United States) Tim Smyczek (qualified)
8. (Tunisia) Malek Jaziri (qualifying competition, lucky loser)
9. (Japan) Yūichi Sugita (qualifying competition)
10. (United States) Michael Russell (qualified)
11. (Australia) James Duckworth (qualifying competition)
12. (France) Vincent Millot (qualifying competition)
13. (France) Michaël Llodra (qualifying competition)
14. (Australia) Thanasi Kokkinakis (qualified)

=== Qualifiers ===
1. (Australia) Thanasi Kokkinakis
2. (United States) Michael Russell
3. (Australia) Bernard Tomic
4. (Germany) Tobias Kamke
5. (Canada) Brayden Schnur
6. (France) Benoît Paire
7. (United States) Tim Smyczek

=== Lucky losers ===
1. ~~(Australia) Marinko Matosevic~~
2. (Tunisia) Malek Jaziri

=== Qualifying draw ===
==== First qualifier ====
First round
1 | (Australia) Marinko Matosevic | 6 | 6
(Australia) Matt Reid | 3 | 2
WC | (Canada) David Volfson | 0 | 0
14 | (Australia) Thanasi Kokkinakis | 6 | 6

Qualifying competition
1 | (Australia) Marinko Matosevic | 7^{9} | 0^{r}
14 | (Australia) Thanasi Kokkinakis | 6^{7} | 0

==== Second qualifier ====
First round
2 | (Germany) Benjamin Becker | 6^{5} | 7^{7} | 3
(France) Fabrice Martin | 7^{7} | 6^{4} | 6
WC | (Canada) Philip Bester | 1 | 0
10 | (United States) Michael Russell | 6 | 6

Qualifying competition
(France) Fabrice Martin | 4 | 6 | 4
10 | (United States) Michael Russell | 6 | 2 | 6

==== Third qualifier ====
First round
3 | (Australia) Bernard Tomic | 6 | 6
(United States) Evan King | 0 | 1
WC | (Canada) Filip Peliwo | 2 | 4
8 | (Tunisia) Malek Jaziri | 6 | 6

Qualifying competition
3 | (Australia) Bernard Tomic | 4 | 6 | 6
8 | (Tunisia) Malek Jaziri | 6 | 1 | 4

==== Fourth qualifier ====
First round
4 | (Germany) Tobias Kamke | 6 | 6
(Canada) Pavel Krainik | 0 | 0
(Bulgaria) Dimitar Kutrovsky | 5 | 3
13 | (France) Michaël Llodra | 7 | 6

Qualifying competition
4 | (Germany) Tobias Kamke | 7^{7} | 6
13 | (France) Michaël Llodra | 6^{2} | 3

==== Fifth qualifier ====
First round
5 | (Australia) Matthew Ebden | 5 | 2
(Canada) Brayden Schnur | 7 | 6
(Canada) Steven Diez | 6^{4} | 4
9 | (Japan) Yūichi Sugita | 7^{7} | 6

Qualifying competition
(Canada) Brayden Schnur | 6 | 6
9 | (Japan) Yūichi Sugita | 1 | 3

==== Sixth qualifier ====
First round
6 | (France) Benoît Paire | 6 | 7^{7}
(United States) Jason Jung | 3 | 6^{4}
(United States) Adam El Mihdawy | 0 | 1
11 | (Australia) James Duckworth | 6 | 6

Qualifying competition
6 | (France) Benoît Paire | 6 | 7^{7}
11 | (Australia) James Duckworth | 4 | 6^{2}

==== Seventh qualifier ====
First round
7 | (United States) Tim Smyczek | 6 | 6
(Canada) Eric Vehovec | 0 | 1
WC | (Canada) Kelsey Stevenson | 4 | 2
12 | (France) Vincent Millot | 6 | 6

Qualifying competition
7 | (United States) Tim Smyczek | 7^{7} | 6
12 | (France) Vincent Millot | 6^{5} | 2
