= Jo-Wilfried Tsonga =

French tennis player (born 1985)

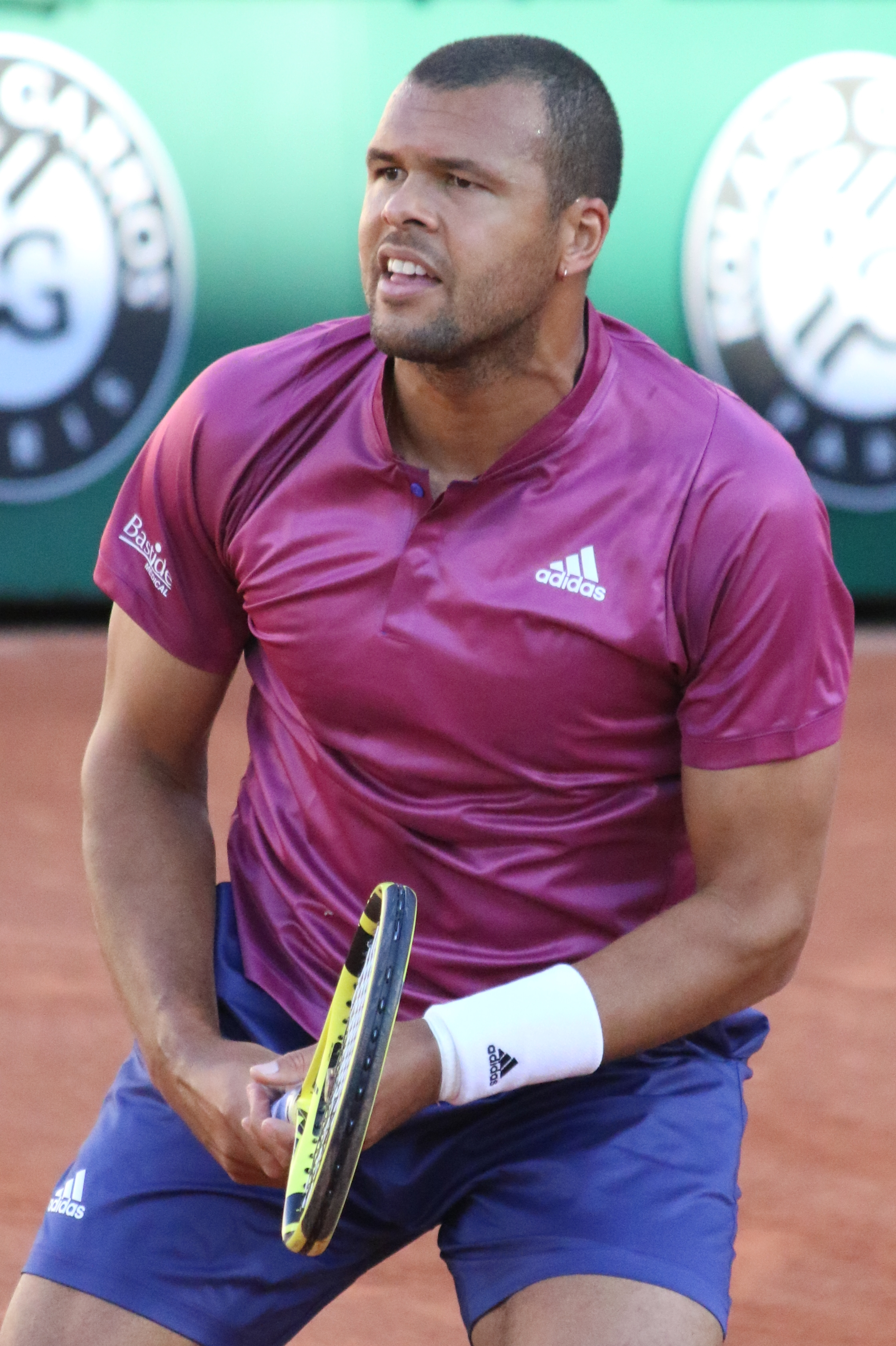
- Tsonga at the 2021 French Open
- Country (sports): France
- Residence: Gingins, Switzerland
- Born: 17 April 1985 (age 41) Le Mans, France
- Height: 1.88 m (6 ft 2 in)
- Turned pro: 2004
- Retired: 2022
- Plays: Right-handed (two-handed backhand)
- Coach: Éric Winogradsky (2004–2011); Roger Rasheed (2012–2013); Nicolas Escudé (2013–2015); Thierry Ascione (2013–2022); Sergi Bruguera (2019–2022)
- Prize money: US$22,524,073: 27th all-time leader in earnings

Singles
- Career record: 467–238 (66.2%) (Note: In ATP Tour and Grand Slam main draw matches, Summer Olympics, Davis Cup)
- Career titles: 18
- Highest ranking: No. 5 (27 February 2012)

Grand Slam singles results
- Australian Open: F (2008)
- French Open: SF (2013, 2015)
- Wimbledon: SF (2011, 2012)
- US Open: QF (2011, 2015, 2016)

Other tournaments
- Tour Finals: F (2011)
- Olympic Games: QF (2012)

Doubles
- Career record: 83–67 (55.3%)
- Career titles: 4
- Highest ranking: No. 33 (26 October 2009)

Grand Slam doubles results
- Australian Open: 2R (2008)
- French Open: 2R (2021)
- Wimbledon: Q1 (2007)

Team competitions
- Davis Cup: W (2017)
- Hopman Cup: W (2014)
Medal record
Men's tennis
Representing France
Olympic Games
| Silver medal – second place | 2012 London | Doubles |

Jo-Wilfried Tsonga (French pronunciation: [ʒo wilfʁid tsɔŋɡa]; born 17 April 1985) is a French former professional tennis player. He was ranked as high as world No. 5 by the Association of Tennis Professionals (ATP), which he achieved in February 2012. Tsonga won 18 singles titles on the ATP Tour, including two Masters 1000 titles, and reached a major final at the 2008 Australian Open.

In his early career, Tsonga won the 2003 US Open junior singles title and was the ATP Newcomer of the Year for 2007. He rose to fame by reaching the 2008 Australian Open final as an unseeded player, defeating four seeded players (including world No. 2 Rafael Nadal) en route. He followed by winning his first Masters title at the 2008 Paris Masters, and reached the final of the 2011 ATP Finals. At the 2012 Summer Olympics, Tsonga won the silver medal in men's doubles partnering Michaël Llodra. He claimed his second Masters title at the 2014 Canadian Open, defeating four top-ten players en route. Tsonga also reached the final of the 2011 Paris Masters and the 2015 Shanghai Masters. In doubles, he won the 2009 Shanghai Masters doubles title partnering Julien Benneteau. In 2017, Tsonga helped France to the Davis Cup crown, after being runner-up in 2014. He retired from the sport at the 2022 French Open. Tsonga is one of only three players (the others being Tomáš Berdych and Stan Wawrinka) to have defeated each of the Big Four at majors. He is a member of the Tennis Club de Paris.

== Early and personal life ==
Tsonga was born on 17 April 1985 in Le Mans to a Congolese father, Didier Tsonga, a handball player, and a French mother, Évelyne Tsonga. His father moved to France during the 1970s to fulfill his dreams of becoming a handball professional player. In France he eventually met Évelyne and they married. Tsonga is nicknamed Ali because of his facial resemblance to boxing legend Muhammad Ali.

His cousin is footballer Maël Lépicier who plays for Congo.

Tsonga had a career-high ITF junior singles ranking of world No. 2, attained on 13 October 2003. He won the 2003 US Open boys' singles title. He reached four other singles semifinals of junior Grand Slam events. Marcos Baghdatis was a major rival of Tsonga on the junior tour.

Tsonga started dating Noura El Shwekh in late 2014 Their first child, a boy, was born on 17 March 2017. Tsonga and El Shwekh married on 21 July 2018.

== Tennis career ==
=== 2003–2006: Junior US Open title and turning pro ===
Tsonga played his first junior match in July 2000 at the age of 15 at a grade 2 tournament in the Netherlands. He had a very successful junior career; he won the US Open boys' singles title in 2003 by defeating Marcos Baghdatis in the final and he was a losing boys' singles semifinalist in the other three Grand Slam events in the same year. Tsonga reached his career-high boys' singles ranking of world no. 2 on 13 October 2003.

Junior Grand Slam results – Singles:

Australian Open: SF (2002, 2003)
French Open: SF (2003)
Wimbledon: SF (2003)
US Open: W (2003)

Tsonga turned pro in 2004. He won three singles qualifying matches at the 2004 China Open held in September of that year to reach the singles main draw of an ATP Tour tournament for the first time in his career; in the main draw, he upset former French Open singles champion, former No. 1 and the top seed Carlos Moyá in the first round, before losing to Lee Hyung-taik in the second round.

Tsonga suffered a string of injuries beginning late in 2004, with a herniated disc that caused him to be out of action until March 2005. Then came two right shoulder injuries later in 2005, back and abdominal ailments from October 2005 to February 2006, and the recurrence of an abdominal injury at the end of 2006. In all, he played (only the singles events of) just eight ATP Tour tournaments from August 2004 to November 2006.

=== 2007: Top 50, first doubles title ===
In January 2007, then ranked No. 212 in the world, Tsonga received a wild card entry into the 2007 Australian Open, where in only his second senior Grand Slam tournament match, he met sixth seed Andy Roddick for the second time in his career. What followed was the longest tiebreak in Australian Open history in the first set, which he went on to win (20–18). Tsonga forced a tiebreak in the second set, as well. However, he went on to lose the match in four sets. He was just 21 at the time.

In 2007, Tsonga won four Challenger titles in Tallahassee, Mexico City, Lanzarote, and Surbiton. Tsonga qualified for the 2007 Queen's Club Championships, while at the same time playing in the Surbiton Challenger, which he won. Between the two events, he won five matches during the course of two days. In the second round of the Queen's main draw, he met the sixth seed and defending champion, former No. 1 Lleyton Hewitt, ranked No. 16 in the ATP rankings. Tsonga won the match after two tiebreaks to seal his most prominent victory since his triumph in ATP debut over former No. 1 Carlos Moyá, then ranked No. 6 in the world, at Beijing in 2004. Tsonga went on to lose to promising Croatian youngster Marin Čilić in the following round.

At Wimbledon 2007, where Tsonga was again awarded a wildcard entry, he reached the fourth round (his first time past round one of a Grand Slam), defeating countryman Julien Benneteau, Nicolás Lapentti, and Feliciano López. His run was halted by his countryman and friend, 12th seed Richard Gasquet, in straight sets. He did not beat a seeded player in his progress to the fourth round (Andy Murray, the potential seed he would have faced, had dropped out). The win brought his ranking up from No. 110 to No. 74, his first time inside the top 75.

Then, at the 2007 US Open, Tsonga defeated Óscar Hernández before beating Tim Henman in what proved to be Henman's last Major. He then lost to Rafael Nadal in three sets.

The 2007 Grand Prix de Tennis de Lyon tournament started strongly for Tsonga. Tsonga beat Vince Spadea, Richard Gasquet, and Olivier Rochus, before losing to compatriot Sébastien Grosjean. He partnered Grosjean, however, in men's doubles, where the team was awarded a wildcard. They beat top seeds Julien Benneteau and Michaël Llodra, Fabrice Santoro and Gilles Simon, and then third seeds Arnaud Clément and Nicolas Mahut in the semifinals. Tsonga won his first doubles title, and Grosjean won his first doubles title in three years by defeating Łukasz Kubot and Lovro Zovko in straight sets.

By the end of the year, Tsonga saw his ranking rise over 150 ranking spots into the top 50. Tsonga began 2007 ranked No. 212, and in early July was in the top 100 at No. 74. In October, Tsonga climbed into the top 50 for the first time in his career, finishing the year ranked No. 43. Tsonga's year-end 169 ranking spots climb was the biggest climb of any player ranked in the top 75.

=== 2008: First major final, first Masters title, top 10 ===
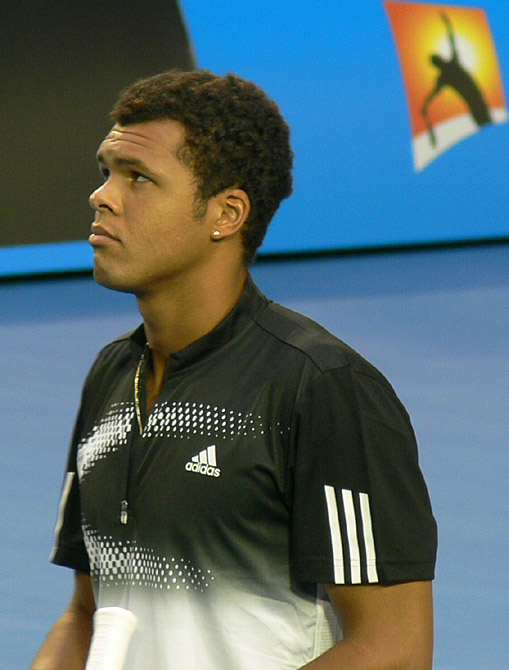
Tsonga defeated Rafael Nadal in the semifinal at the 2008 Australian Open reaching his sole Grand Slam final

Starting his 2008 season at the 2008 Next Generation Adelaide International, Tsonga defeated Victor Hănescu, Ernests Gulbis and Lleyton Hewitt (the top seed). However, he fell in the semifinals to Jarkko Nieminen. In doubles, Tsonga and Sébastien Grosjean lost to Florian Mayer and Chris Haggard in the first round.

Tsonga played doubles in the Sydney Medibank International with Richard Gasquet. They scored a major upset in the final over world No. 1 team Bob and Mike Bryan in a super-tiebreak.

Tsonga began his 2008 Australian Open campaign with a tough first-round match against ninth seed Andy Murray and pulled off a four-set victory. Tsonga then defeated Sam Warburg, Guillermo García López, Richard Gasquet and Mikhail Youzhny to reach the semifinals. In the semifinals, Tsonga shocked second seed Rafael Nadal in straight sets. He did not face a break point on his serve until the third set, while breaking the Spaniard five times in the match. The victory earned him a spot in his first Grand Slam final, where he was beaten by No. 3 Novak Djokovic in four sets. Tsonga was the only player in the tournament to take a set from Djokovic. Following the tournament, he saw his ranking climb to a career-high of No. 18.

Tsonga then competed at the Indian Wells Masters, where he reached the fourth round, before losing to defending champion Rafael Nadal in three sets. Following the tournament, Tsonga saw his ATP ranking climb again to a new career high of No. 12.

Tsonga pulled out of the French Open because of a knee problem that lasted for several months. This knee injury made him pull out of the quarterfinals of the Davis Cup, France vs. the United States. He underwent successful knee surgery and participated in the 2008 US Open. He defeated Santiago Ventura and Carlos Moyá, before falling to No. 5 Tommy Robredo in the third round.

At the Thailand Open he defeated Lukáš Dlouhý, Jürgen Melzer, Gaël Monfils, and Novak Djokovic to claim his first career ATP title. At the Paris Masters, Tsonga overcame Djokovic once again to earn a place in the quarterfinals. He then defeated Andy Roddick and James Blake. In the final, Tsonga defeated David Nalbandian in a competitive three-set match to capture his first career ATP Masters Series championship. His win allowed him to secure a spot in the year-end Tennis Masters Cup.

In the round-robin portion of the Masters Cup, Tsonga lost to Nikolay Davydenko and Juan Martín del Potro, and beat Novak Djokovic, but he did not advance to the semifinals.

=== 2009: First ATP Masters 1000 doubles title ===
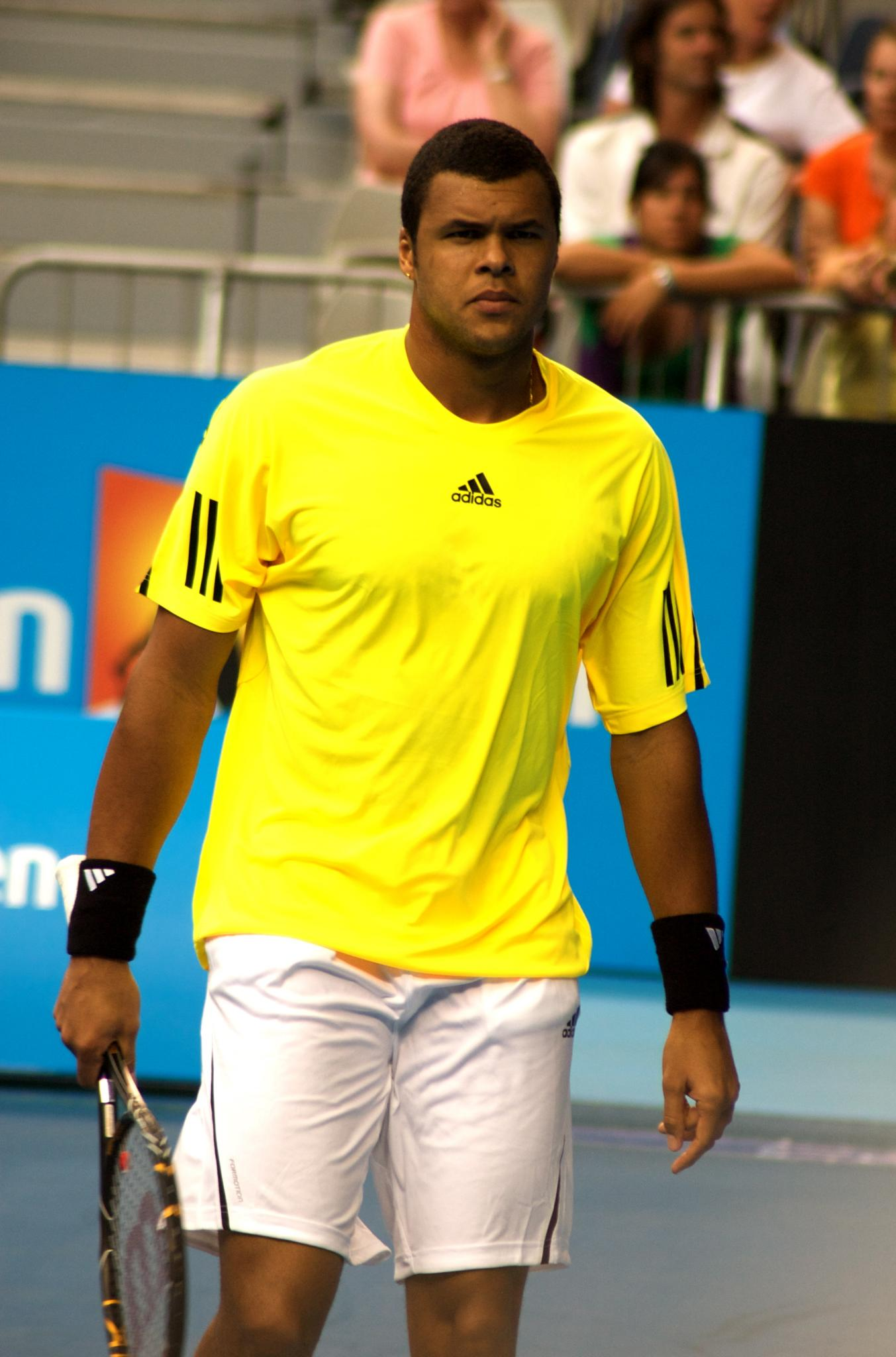
Tsonga reached the quarterfinals at the 2009 Australian Open

Tsonga started his 2009 season in Australia at the Brisbane International tournament. He defeated Agustín Calleri and Jarkko Nieminen, but lost to Richard Gasquet in the quarterfinals in three sets. Tsonga teamed up with fellow Frenchman Marc Gicquel to win the doubles title by defeating Fernando Verdasco and Mischa Zverev in the final. The duo had beaten Travis Parrott and Filip Polášek, Simon Aspelin and Pavel Vízner, and Mario Ančić and Paul-Henri Mathieu en route to the finals.

At the Medibank International, Tsonga was forced to retire with a back injury before his quarterfinal match against Jarkko Nieminen. He had defeated Italy's Simone Bolelli in straight sets to set up the clash with Nieminen.

At Australian Open Tsonga lost in the quarterfinals to Fernando Verdasco in four sets. His rank went down to No. 14. He next entered the South African Tennis Open in Johannesburg, where he won his first title of the year, and third overall, by defeating Jérémy Chardy in the final. After his triumph in South Africa, Tsonga entered the ABN AMRO World Tennis Tournament in Rotterdam, where he lost to No. 1 Rafael Nadal in the quarterfinals in three sets.

Tsonga then entered the Open 13 in Marseille. He defeated Andrey Golubev, Simone Bolelli, and Feliciano López, before notching his fourth straight win over Novak Djokovic in the semifinals. In his second all-French final of the month, he defeated Michaël Llodra to win his second tournament in three weeks.

Tsonga was then called up to play the singles matches for France against the Czech Republic in their Davis Cup first-round clash. Tsonga defeated Radek Štěpánek, but the Czech Republic had an insurmountable 3–1 lead. Tsonga gave France a consolation point by beating Jan Hernych.

At the BNP Paribas Open in Indian Wells, California, Tsonga made an early exit from the tournament, as he was defeated by the Russian Igor Andreev in the third round. At Sony Ericsson Open in Miami, he defeated Agustín Calleri, Robert Kendrick, and Gilles Simon, only to lose to Novak Djokovic in the quarterfinals. After skipping two tournaments, Tsonga made his return at the Internazionali BNL d'Italia in Rome, but he lost his first singles match in the clay-court season at the hands of Richard Gasquet. In doubles, he and partner Julien Benneteau lost to the Polish pair of Mariusz Fyrstenberg and Marcin Matkowski in the second round.

Tsonga then entered the Madrid Masters, but lost in round two. Afterwards, he received the 2008 ATP Most Improved Player of the Year award.

Tsonga then represented France at Düsseldorf, Germany in the ARAG World Team Cup. He won the first tie against Sweden's Andreas Vinciguerra, but lost in doubles. Tsonga was defeated by German Philipp Kohlschreiber, but then beat American Robby Ginepri. However, France lost three successive ties during the week

Tsonga then entered the French Open. He recorded his first-ever match win at the tournament by defeating Julien Benneteau in the first round. He then had wins over Juan Mónaco and Christophe Rochus, before his fine run ended at the hands of fifth seed Juan Martín del Potro. Next up was the Gerry Weber Open, Tsonga suffered a straight-set defeat against German Tommy Haas in the second round. However, In doubles, Tsonga was paired with his French compatriot Marc Gicquel, but they were also defeated in round two.

Tsonga then entered Wimbledon. He survived a tough four-set against Andrey Golubev and received a walkover from Simone Bolelli, before losing to Ivo Karlović of Croatia. At the Legg Mason Tennis Classic in Washington, D.C, Tsonga lost to the American John Isner in the second round. Tsonga made his debut at the Rogers Cup in Montreal, Quebec, Canada. He defeated Rainer Schüttler and Gilles Simon. In the quarterfinals, he overcame No. 1 Roger Federer, coming back from an injury timeout after winning the first set by a dive-volley, as well as being 1–5 down in the third set. In the semifinals he lost to Andy Murray in straight sets.

At the Western & Southern Financial Group Masters in Cincinnati, Tsonga made an early exit from the singles category, unexpectedly losing to No. 124 Chris Guccione of Australia. In doubles, Tsonga and Michaël Llodra lost to Mahesh Bhupathi and Mark Knowles in the quarterfinals.

The US Open started well with victories over Chase Buchanan, Jarkko Nieminen, and Julien Benneteau. However, Tsonga lost to 11th seed Chilean Fernando González in the fourth round. Tsonga then represented France at the Davis Cup playoff round against the Netherlands. Tsonga defeated Jesse Huta Galung and Thiemo de Bakker in singles and, with partner Michaël Llodra, won in doubles over Thiemo de Bakker and Igor Sijsling, wrapping up the tie 4–1.

Tsonga then entered the PTT Thailand Open, where he was the defending champion and top seed, as Rafael Nadal withdrew just days before the tournament began. After two close matches, Tsonga crashed out to the young Serbian Viktor Troicki in the semifinals. Tsonga also competed in the doubles category with Fabrice Santoro, but they lost to Mischa Zverev and Guillermo García López in the semifinals. At the Japan Open in Tokyo, Tsonga defeated Mischa Zverev, Richard Gasquet, Ernests Gulbis, and Gaël Monfils to reach the final. There, he beat Mikhail Youzhny in just over an hour to clinch his third title of the season and his first-ever ATP World Tour 500 title. In the doubles category, Tsonga paired with Swiss Stanislas Wawrinka, but they were defeated in the second round.

Next up was a trip to China and the Shanghai Masters. Tsonga defeated Zeng Shao-Xuan, but lost to Robin Söderling in the third round. In doubles, paired with Julien Benneteau, he made it to the finals, where they beat sixth seeded Mariusz Fyrstenberg and Marcin Matkowski to win their first-ever ATP Masters 1000 doubles title. After two disappointing tournaments at Lyon and the Valencia Open, Tsonga entered the Paris Masters, where he was the defending champion. He had wins over Albert Montañés and Gilles Simon, but lost to No. 2 Rafael Nadal in the quarterfinals. He ended his 2009 season staying in the top 10 for the second year in a row.

=== 2010: Davis Cup final ===
Tsonga switched his rackets to Babolat (previously using Wilson) and started his 2010 season at the AAMI Kooyong Classic, after recovering from a wrist injury. After two wins and a walkover, he lost to Fernando Verdasco in the final. At the 2010 Australian Open, Tsonga beat Sergiy Stakhovsky, Taylor Dent, Tommy Haas, and Nicolás Almagro. In the quarterfinals, he beat No. 3 Novak Djokovic, in his second five-set match. Tsonga's fatigue soon took a toll on him, however, as he was badly beaten in the semifinals by No. 1 Roger Federer.

Tsonga then entered Open 13 in Marseille, France. He had two wins, but lost against Julien Benneteau in the semifinal. At 2010 Dubai Tennis Championships, he won against Michaël Llodra, who retired due to injury, but then struggled with form and lost to Ivan Ljubičić in the second round. The Davis Cup was next against Germany. In the singles, Tsonga helped France take an unassailable 3–0 lead, by winning the second-rubber match against Benjamin Becker, but was forced to retire against Simon Greul due to a recurring injury.

At the 2010 BNP Paribas Open, Tsonga lost to Robin Söderling in the fourth round. He was seeded eighth at the 2010 Sony Ericsson Open in Miami. He beat Guillermo García López, Philipp Kohlschreiber, and Juan Carlos Ferrero, before losing to Rafael Nadal, after blowing eight break-point opportunities. Tsonga then made his debut at the 2010 Monte-Carlo Rolex Masters. He had a win over Nicolás Almagro, but was edged out in a match against Juan Carlos Ferrero.

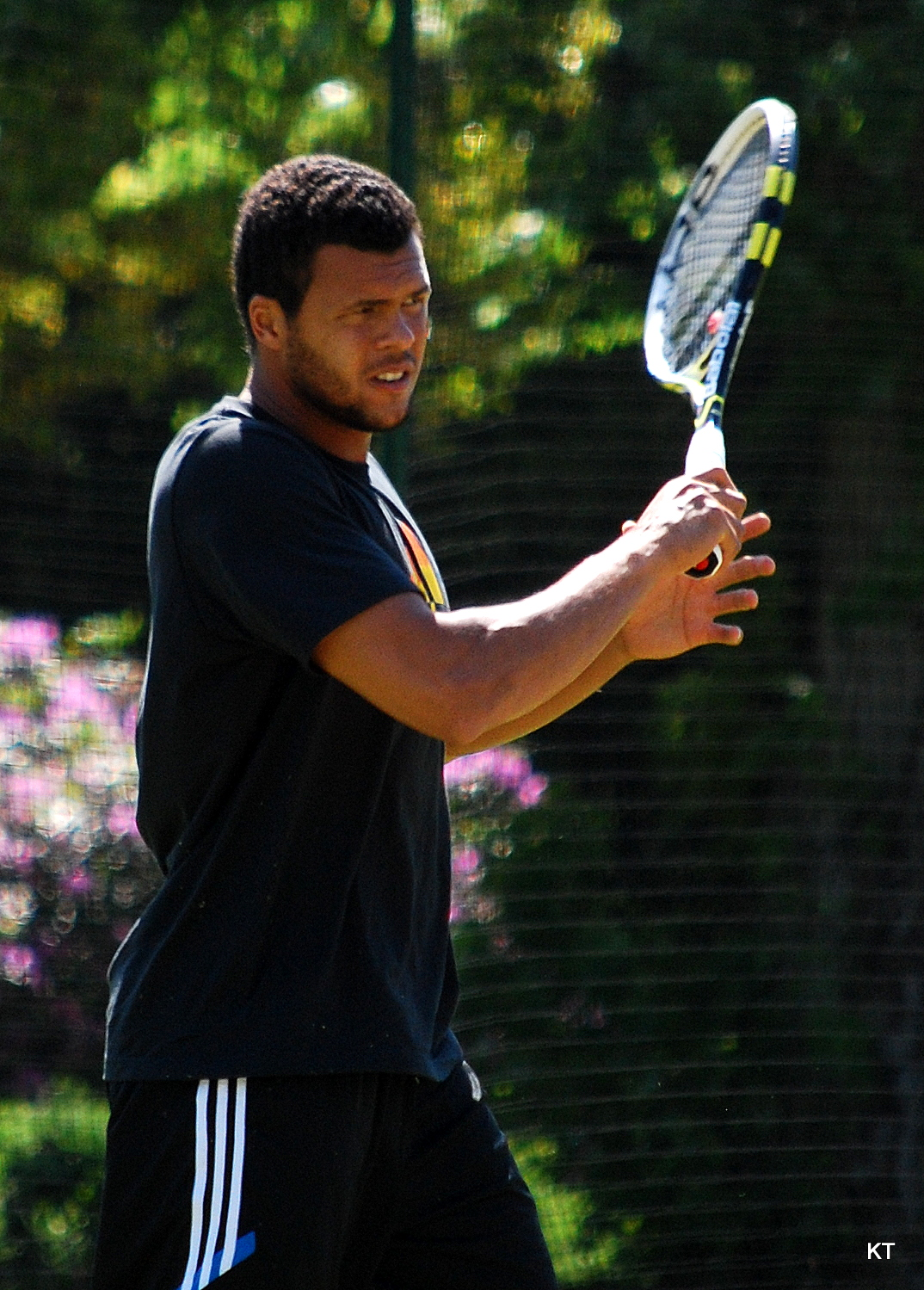
Tsonga at the Boodles Challenge exhibition tournament

After nursing an injury, Tsonga entered the 2010 Barcelona Open Banco Sabadell. After wins over Jan Hájek and Nicolás Almagro, he was stunned by Dutch youngster Thiemo de Bakker in the quarterfinals. At the 2010 Internazionali BNL d'Italia, but was beaten by David Ferrer in the quarterfinals. At the 2010 Mutua Madrileña Madrid Open, he was forced to retire in the opening round against Guillermo García López.

Seeded eighth at the 2010 French Open, Tsonga defeated Daniel Brands, in five sets, Josselin Ouanna, and Thiemo de Bakker. Unfortunately, in the fourth round, Tsonga had to withdraw after losing the first set against Mikhail Youzhny, due to the progressive regional back pain from the previous round. Scans showed that Tsonga had sustained a right hip injury.

At Wimbledon he was seeded tenth. He had tough wins over Robert Kendrick and Alexandr Dolgopolov, before easier victories over Tobias Kamke and Julien Benneteau. However, in the quarterfinals, he eventually fell to home favorite Andy Murray in four sets. Not long after his Wimbledon campaign, Jo suffered a heavy knee injury. It caused him to withdraw from all the US Open Series events, including the US Open.

Tsonga made his return in October for his title defense at the 2010 Rakuten Japan Open Tennis Championships as the third seed, but rustiness was apparent, and he lost early to Jarkko Nieminen. Entering the 2010 Shanghai Rolex Masters 1000 as the 12th seed, Tsonga had wins over Feliciano López, Sam Querrey, and Florian Mayer, before losing in the quarterfinals in straight sets to eventual champion Andy Murray. He then entered the Kremlin Cup in Moscow, but lost against Viktor Troicki in the second round. A week later, Tsonga made a semifinal appearance at the Open Sud de France in Montpellier, but was beaten by Gaël Monfils for the first time.

During the week in Montpellier, Tsonga re-aggravated his knee problem. He missed the Paris Masters, as well as the French Davis Cup final against Serbia. It was a tough end to the season for Tsonga, as he finished the season outside the top 10 for the first time in three years, compiled a 31–16 win–loss record (his worst tally since 2007), and failed to reach a single final during the season.

=== 2011: Tour Finals and Paris Masters finals ===
Tsonga started his ATP season with an exhibition tournament at Abu Dhabi. However, Tsonga suffered a loss to Robin Söderling, but later told the press that being out of tennis for several months last season has made him hungry and determined.

At the Qatar ExxonMobil Open, Tsonga defeated Rubén Ramírez Hidalgo, Sergey Bubka, and Guillermo García López, before losing to Roger Federer in the semifinal. The AAMI Kooyong Classic had Tsonga losing early to Jürgen Melzer. Tsonga then entered the 2011 Australian Open. After a thrilling win over Philipp Petzschner and breezing past Andreas Seppi, Tsonga lost to Alexandr Dolgopolov in five sets.

Tsonga then participated in the ABN AMRO World Tennis Tournament in Rotterdam, Netherlands. He defeated Bulgarian Grigor Dimitrov, Michaël Llodra, and Ivan Ljubičić to reach his first final since winning the Japan Open in 2009, but lost there to Robin Söderling. At the Open 13 tennis tournament, Tsonga lost to Russian Mikhail Youzhny in the quarterfinals. A day later, he declared that he had sustained another ankle injury, which again put him out of Davis Cup action against Austria. Tsonga fell in the opening round at the 2011 BNP Paribas Open.

At the 2011 Sony Ericsson Open, as the 15th seed, Tsonga's poor form continued. He managed to get a win over Teymuraz Gabashvili, but fell to Alexandr Dolgopolov in a match that lasted two days. Afterwards, he announced that he and his longtime coach Éric Winogradsky had decided to part ways after working together for seven years. At the 2011 Monte-Carlo Rolex Masters, he had a win over Juan Mónaco, but was beaten by Ivan Ljubičić in round two. Then came a first-round loss at the 2011 Estoril Open. Tsonga then found some form at the 2011 Mutua Madrid Open, beating first-time top-10 debutant Nicolás Almagro, before losing to Robin Söderling in the third round. At the 2011 Internazionali BNL d'Italia, he beat juniors rival Marcos Baghdatis, but lost to Roger Federer in the second round.

Tsonga was 19th seed heading into the French Open. He beat both Jan Hájek and Igor Andreev in straight sets and made it to the third round, where he was defeated by 14th seed Stanislas Wawrinka. At the 2011 Aegon Championships in London, Tsonga beat Michael Berrer and Rafael Nadal, while moving through to the semifinals for the first time in a grass tournament. In the semifinals, he defeated British wildcard James Ward, but he let slip a healthy lead in a loss against Andy Murray in the final. Just 24 hours later, he arrived at the 2011 Aegon International in Eastbourne. In his opening round, he defeated Denis Istomin, but he lost to Radek Štěpánek in round two.

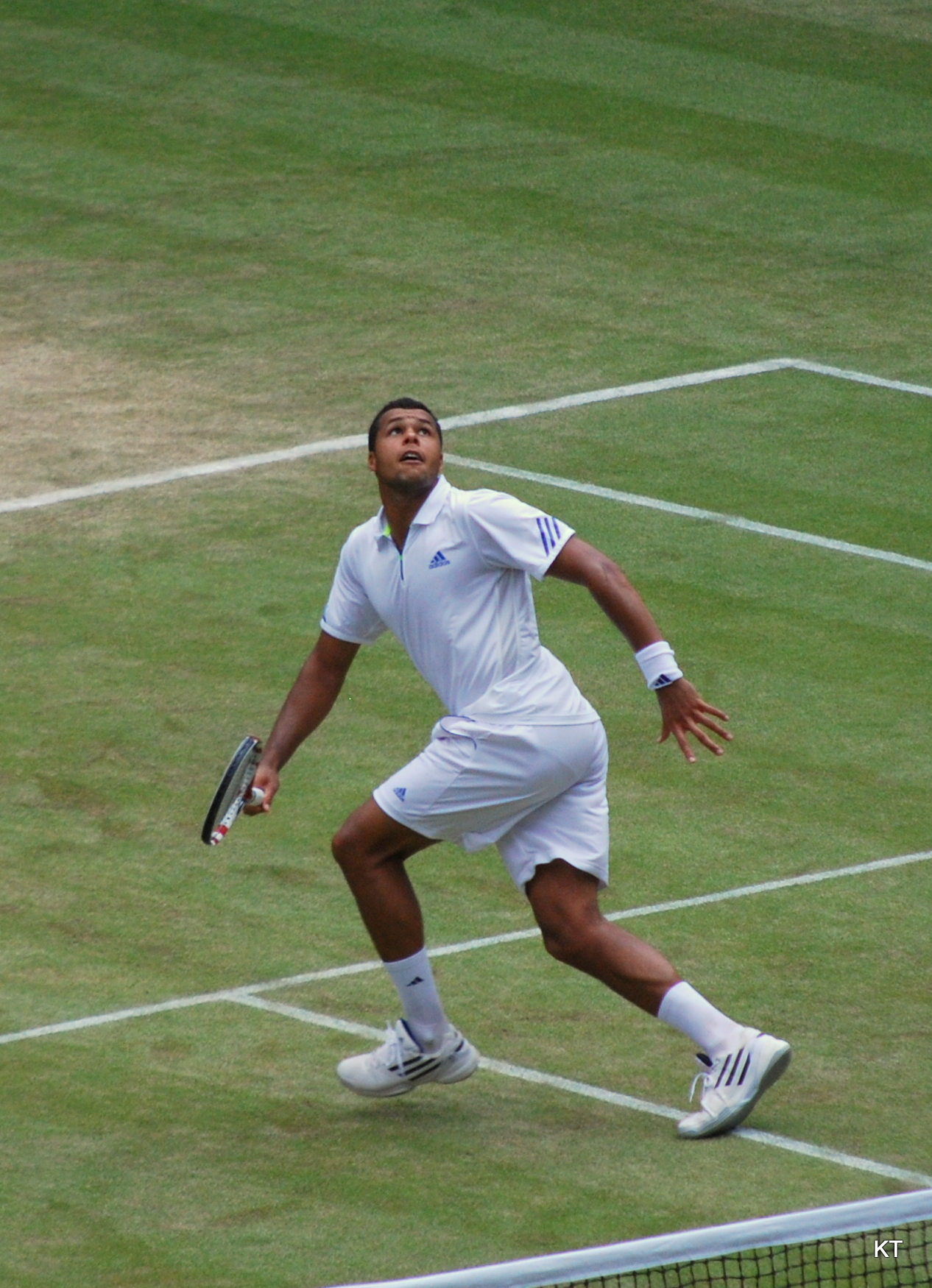
Tsonga at the 2011 Wimbledon Championships, where he reached the semifinals for the first time

At the 2011 Wimbledon Championships, Tsonga defeated Go Soeda, Grigor Dimitrov, Fernando González, and David Ferrer. In the quarterfinals, he stunned the Centre Court crowd by coming from two sets down to defeat Roger Federer. This handed Federer his first loss in a Grand Slam after leading two sets to love, while handing Tsonga only his second win in coming back from two sets down. In the semifinals, however, despite serving for the first set and saving three match points in the third-set tiebreak, he eventually lost to second seed and eventual champion Novak Djokovic in four sets.

At the Rogers Cup in Montreal, Tsonga defeated Fabio Fognini, Bernard Tomic, Roger Federer, and Nicolás Almagro, to set up a Wimbledon semifinal rematch against Novak Djokovic. After trailing 4–6, 0–3, Tsonga retired due to an arm problem. At the 2011 Western & Southern Open, Tsonga defeated Marin Čilić, but lost to qualifier Alex Bogomolov Jr. At the US Open, he defeated Lu Yen-hsun, Sergey Bubka, Fernando Verdasco, and Mardy Fish. He again met Roger Federer in the quarterfinals, but this time Federer swept him aside in three sets.

Tsonga teamed up with Michaël Llodra to notch an impressive victory over Fernando Verdasco and Feliciano López in Davis Cup play against Spain, but then was crushed by Rafael Nadal in his fourth singles rubber, as France lost the tie against Spain 1–4. Tsonga played at the 2011 Open de Moselle, where he was the top-seeded player. He defeated Mathieu Rodrigues and Nicolas Mahut, and in the semifinals he ended a two-match losing streak against Alexandr Dolgopolov. In the final, Tsonga fought past Ivan Ljubičić in three sets to win the tournament; his first title in almost two years since his triumph in Tokyo.

At 2011 China Open, he opened with wins over Grigor Dimitrov, Zhang Ze, and Juan Carlos Ferrero. In Tsonga's semifinal match against Tomáš Berdych Tsonga could not withstand Berdych's growing confidence in a three-set loss. Tsonga was fourth seed for the 2011 Shanghai Rolex Masters. Tsonga lost his first match to Kei Nishikori. Vienna was the next destination for Tsonga in the 2011 Erste Bank Open. Victories over Jarkko Nieminen, Xavier Malisse, and Daniel Brands set up a final against Juan Martín del Potro. The first set was tight with del Potro taking it in a tie-break, but Tsonga prevailed in sets two and three for his second title of the season.

Just two days after Tsonga's victory in Vienna, Tsonga played his first-round match at the 2011 Valencia Open 500. He lost in round two to Sam Querrey. As expected, the home crowd warmed to Jo from the start of the 2011 BNP Paribas Masters. Tsonga had wins over Guillermo García López, Andreas Seppi, and John Isner, which set up a final against Roger Federer. Federer stormed through the first set and then won a tiebreak in the second to take the title.

As a result of Tsonga's exploits in the Paris Masters, he qualified for the Barclays ATP World Tour Finals. Tsonga fell to Federer, beat Mardy Fish, and defeated Rafael Nadal to make it to the semifinals. A win over Tomáš Berdych sent Tsonga to the finals of the year-end championships for the first time in his career. In the final, Tsonga fought bravely, but came up short once again against Roger Federer. Tsonga finished the year matching his 2008 career-high ranking of No. 6.

=== 2012: World No. 5, Olympic silver ===
Just before 2012 began, Tsonga participated in the Abu Dhabi exhibition tournament in late December 2011, where he lost a match against David Ferrer. Tsonga then began his 2012 season at the 2012 Qatar Open. Three wins set up a meeting against Roger Federer in the semifinals. However, Federer announced an unexpected withdrawal from the tournament due to a back problem, which gave Tsonga a walkover into the final. In the final, he won against Gaël Monfils. Tsonga then played in the 2012 AAMI Classic exhibition tournament and lost the two matches he played.

A week later, Tsonga had wins over Denis Istomin, Ricardo Mello, and Frederico Gil to make the round of 16 at the 2012 Australian Open. However, against Kei Nishikori, Tsonga lost a close five set match. He took some time off before entering the 2012 Open 13. Two routine wins placed him in the semifinals against Juan Martín del Potro, where he lost in three sets. Next on the calendar was the 2012 Dubai Tennis Championships. Tsonga defeated Marcos Baghdatis and Lukáš Rosol, but lost once again to del Potro.

The first Masters Series of the season, the 2012 BNP Paribas Open saw struggles. A retirement by Michaël Llodra and a win over Radek Štěpánek preceded a loss to David Nalbandian, after holding a match point. At the 2012 Sony Ericsson Open, three easy wins paved the way to a quarterfinal encounter with Rafael Nadal. Tsonga fought hard, but Nadal battled to a three-set win.

In Davis Cup play, Tsonga beat Ryan Harrison and lost to John Isner. France was eliminated from the event. The start of the clay-court run was next at the 2012 Monte-Carlo Rolex Masters. The results were wins against Philipp Kohlschreiber and Fernando Verdasco and a loss against Gilles Simon. The 2012 BMW Open yielded a first-round loss to Tommy Haas. The 2012 Mutua Madrid Open was similar, with a second-round loss to Alexandr Dolgopolov. The 2012 Internazionali BNL d'Italia followed. Two victories against Viktor Troicki and Juan Martín del Potro set up a loss to top seed Novak Djokovic in the quarterfinals.

Tsonga's French Open 2012 started off in shaky fashion after dropping the first set to Russian qualifier Andrey Kuznetsov. However, he closed out the match and then had wins over Cedrik-Marcel Stebe, Fabio Fognini, and Stanislas Wawrinka. In the quarterfinals against Novak Djokovic, he lost in five sets. The grass-court season began with the Aegon Championships. He defeated Britain's Jamie Baker, but was ousted by Ivan Dodig in three extremely tight sets. He also suffered a finger injury during the match after diving in an attempt to retrieve a ball.

In the days leading up to Wimbledon, it was announced that Tsonga had a severely sprained finger, but would still compete. This proved to be a good tournament for Tsonga, with wins over Lleyton Hewitt, Guillermo García López, Lukáš Lacko, Mardy Fish, and Philipp Kohlschreiber. He then faced Andy Murray for a place in the final, but despite managing to fight back to take the third set, Tsonga was ousted by the No. 4-ranked Murray.

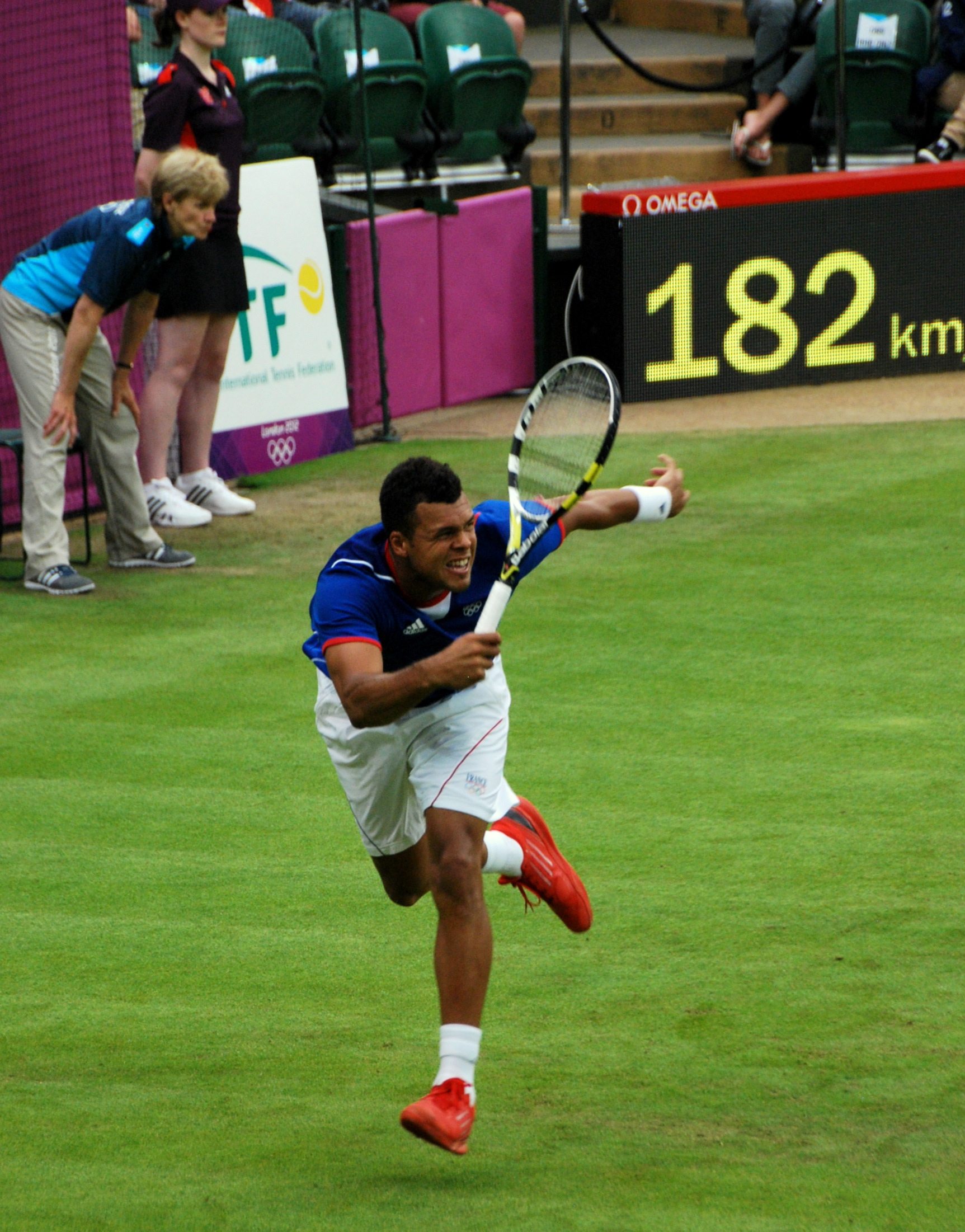
Tsonga won the silver medal in the men's doubles event at the 2012 London Olympics.

The 2012 London Summer Olympics was next up for Tsonga. His victory over Milos Raonic in the second round became the longest ever (in number of games played) at the Olympics. Fatigue, surprisingly, did not appear to affect Tsonga in the third round. He eased into the quarterfinals over Feliciano López, but lost to No. 2 Novak Djokovic. In the men's doubles event, Tsonga represented France alongside Michaël Llodra. The pair won their opening match against Argentinians David Nalbandian and Eduardo Schwank, and followed it with a win over India's Leander Paes and Vishnu Vardhan. They faced the Brazilian duo of Marcelo Melo and Bruno Soares in the quarterfinals, and earned a two set victory for a semifinal berth. In a marathon encounter, they won their next match against the Spaniards López and David Ferrer, 18–16 in the third set. In the finals, they faced the top seeded Americans Mike and Bob Bryan, but lost in straight sets, thus winning the Olympic silver medal.

At Rogers Cup he suffered a second-round loss to Jérémy Chardy. He also crashed out in the second round of the 2012 US Open, after a defeat by No. 52 Martin Kližan. After a short break for recovery, Jo was back in France for the 2012 Moselle Open. Tsonga rolled to a semifinal berth with Russian Nikolay Davydenko. Tsonga had never beaten Davydenko in two previous attempts, but had a tight three-set win. The final was an easy two-set win over Andreas Seppi, Tsonga's ninth ATP career title.

At the 2012 China Open, Tsonga had a win and a walkover before beating Mikhail Youzhny in the quarterfinals. An easy win over Feliciano López advanced Tsonga to his third final of the year. No. 2 Novak Djokovic was his opponent. Djokovic won the match in two sets. Tsonga continued his year with the 2012 Shanghai Masters. He had wins over Benoît Paire and Marcos Baghdatis, but he lost in the quarterfinals to Tomáš Berdych in straight sets. The busy schedule continued in Stockholm. Tsonga cruised past Go Soeda and Sergiy Stakhovsky in the opening rounds, and had Baghdatis retire against him after a close semifinal match. This set up a final against Tomáš Berdych – the second time in two weeks. Despite being a set and a break up, Tsonga lost in three sets.

At the Valencia Open, Tsonga retired against Xavier Malisse. The Race To London was almost decided. Tsonga needed a quarterfinal appearance in Paris to secure it for certain. Tsonga came through an extremely tight encounter with Julien Benneteau and then beat Nicolás Almagro; though Tsonga fell to David Ferrer in the quarterfinals, his win over Almagro secured his place in the ATP World Tour Finals. The Tour Finals found Tsonga with a new coach, Roger Rasheed. Novak Djokovic was his first round-robin opponent and Tsonga lost in two sets. Two more losses to Tomáš Berdych and Andy Murray ended his season.

=== 2013: French Open semifinal, 10th title ===
At 2013 Hopman Cup he was paired with Mathilde Johansson. Tsonga defeated Fernando Verdasco, John Isner and Kevin Anderson. France finished bottom of their group, but despite injuring himself at Hopman Cup, Jo was declared fit for the 2013 Australian Open, where he reached the quarterfinals but lost a thrilling five setter against Roger Federer.

In Rotterdam, Tsonga made a surprising first-round exit against Igor Sijsling. Tsonga then played in the Open 13 in Marseille. In the quarterfinals, he saved five match points to edge Bernard Tomic, and then rolled over his countryman Gilles Simon in the semifinals. In the final, Tsonga saved a match point and overcame top seed Tomáš Berdych in three sets for his 10th ATP World Tour title.

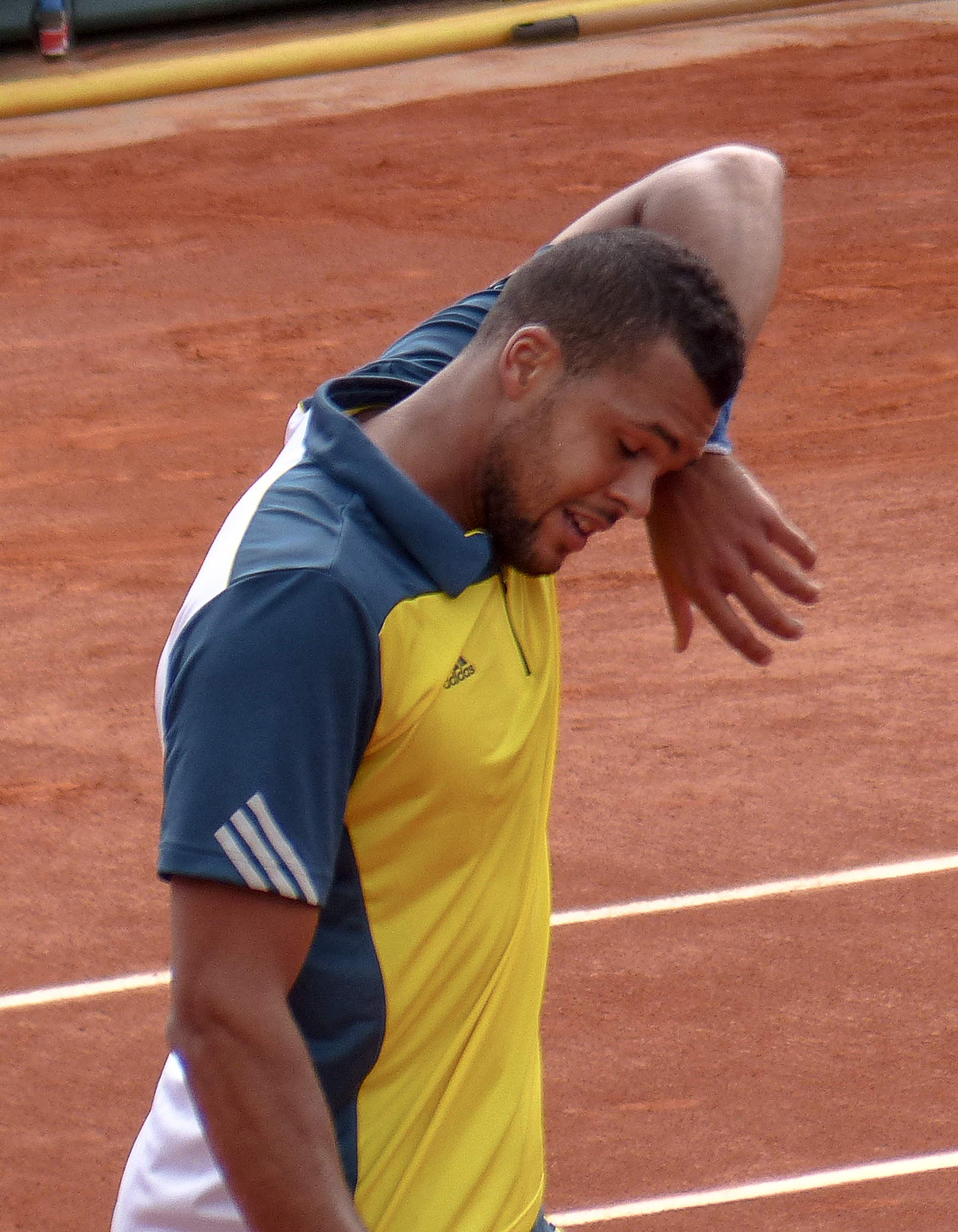
Tsonga during his match against Jarkko Nieminen at the 2013 French Open

At the French Open, Tsonga gained a decisive straight-set quarterfinal victory against Roger Federer, making Tsonga the first French player to reach the semifinals since Gaël Monfils in 2008, as well as only the second player after Rafael Nadal to have beaten Federer at both Wimbledon and the French Open. Tsonga was then defeated in straight sets by David Ferrer.

Following a run to the semifinals at Queen's, where Tsonga lost to the eventual champion, Andy Murray, Tsonga then competed at Wimbledon, where he was a two-time semifinalist. He retired in the second round against Ernests Gulbis. He missed the entire North American swing, including the US Open for the second time in four years, due to the injury.

Tsonga then made a comeback at Metz, reaching the final but losing to compatriot Gilles Simon. At the 2013 BNP Paribas Masters, Tsonga lost his first match to Kei Nishikori, thus ruling him out of contention for the ATP World Tour Finals and capping off a disappointing season for Tsonga.

=== 2014: Hopman Cup champion, 2nd Masters title ===
Tsonga started his season winning the Hopman Cup with compatriot Alizé Cornet. In the fourth round of the 2014 Australian Open, he lost to longtime friend and rival Roger Federer in straight sets, despite not dropping a set in the first three rounds. Tsonga's next tournament was the Rotterdam Open. He reached the second round before falling to Marin Čilić in two tight sets. Tsonga reached the final of 2014 Open 13 losing to Ernest Gulbis. At the 2014 Dubai Tennis Championships, he was defeated by Tomáš Berdych. At the 2014 Indian Wells Masters, he suffered a first round exit against Julien Benneteau. He was defeated by Andy Murray in the fourth round of the 2014 Sony Open Tennis.

Tsonga reach in the quarterfinals of the 2014 Monte-Carlo Rolex Masters but was defeated by Roger Federer. He was defeated by Santiago Giraldo in the second round of the 2014 Mutua Madrid Open in straight sets. He was defeated by Milos Raonic for the first time in three meetings at the Rome Masters third round. In French Open, he made to the fourth round, losing to Novak Djokovic in straight sets.

Tsonga began his grass court season by reaching the 3rd round of the 2014 Aegon Championships. He was stunned by Marinko Matosevic in straight sets. He then advanced to the fourth round of Wimbledon after a tricky first and second round against Jürgen Melzer and Sam Querrey, both taking him to 5 sets. He fell to two-time champion and longstanding rival Novak Djokovic in straight sets.

Tsonga showed excellent form in Toronto, winning his second Masters title by defeating Roger Federer in straight sets. Tsonga won the crown capturing four wins over top-10 players, a first at a Masters-1000 event in twelve years. Impressively, Tsonga defeated three of the Big Four in a single tournament, capturing victories over Novak Djokovic in the third round, Andy Murray in the quarterfinals, and Federer in the final. His semi-final win was against Wimbledon semi-finalist Grigor Dimitrov. He was beaten by Andy Murray in the fourth round of 2014 US Open in straight sets. After that, Tsonga was instrumental in driving the French Davis Cup team into the finals of the 2014 Davis Cup by winning both his singles and doubles matches. At the Moselle Open at Metz, he won in straight sets against Gilles Müller but was defeated by David Goffin in the quarterfinals.

=== 2015: Fourth Masters final ===
After a quiet, injury-hit start to the season in which Tsonga did not play at the Australian Open, he began his 2015 campaign at Miami, where he beat Tim Smyczek but lost to Gaël Monfils in the second round. He reached the third round at the next two Masters 1000 events, the Monte-Carlo Rolex Masters and the Mutua Madrid Open, losing out to Marin Čilić and Tomáš Berdych respectively.

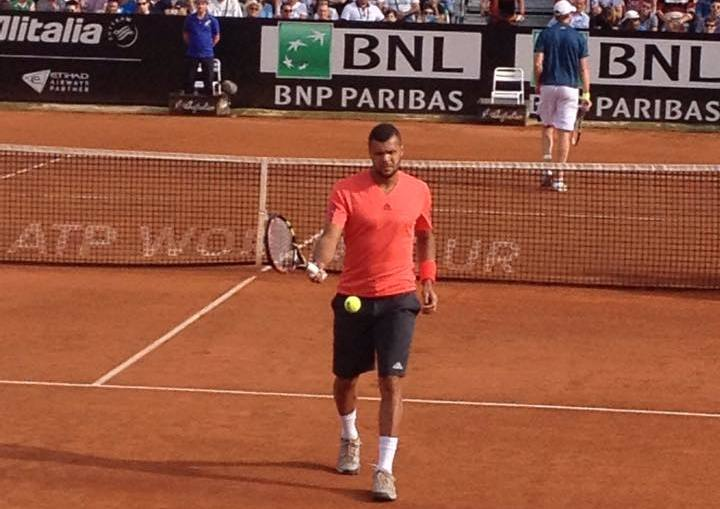
Tsonga at the 2015 Internazionali BNL d'Italia

Tsonga reached his second French Open semifinal and sixth overall at Grand Slam tournaments, with wins over fourth seed Tomáš Berdych and fifth seed Kei Nishikori in the fourth round and quarterfinals respectively. In the semifinals, he was defeated by eighth seed and eventual champion Stan Wawrinka, in four close sets.

Tsonga played at the 2015 Wimbledon Championships and won the first two rounds before losing out to Ivo Karlović in the round of 32 in four sets. He then played for France at the Davis Cup tie against Great Britain; he lost his match against Andy Murray and France went on to lose the rubber 3–1. Tsonga lost to Murray again in the quarterfinals of the 2015 Rogers Cup, having previously beaten Bernard Tomic, Roberto Bautista Agut, and Borna Ćorić.

Seeded 19th at the 2015 US Open, Tsonga beat Jarkko Nieminen, Marcel Granollers, Sergiy Stakhovsky, and Benoît Paire to reach his second US Open quarterfinal without dropping a single service game. He then lost to the defending champion Marin Čilić in a tightly contested five-set match. Tsonga came back after losing the first two sets and saved three match points in the fourth to force a decider.

Tsonga won his twelfth singles title and third at the Moselle Open in Metz, France with a victory over compatriot Gilles Simon in a hard-fought three-set final match. Tsonga entered the 2015 Shanghai Rolex Masters ranked No. 15, and reached the final beating Kevin Anderson and Rafael Nadal in the quarterfinals and semifinals respectively. He lost the final to Novak Djokovic, but despite the loss, re-entered the world's top 10.

=== 2016: Wimbledon and US Open quarterfinals ===
Tsonga began the 2016 season at the Auckland tournament. He beat Philipp Kohlschreiber in two sets, followed by a tight two-set victory against Fabio Fognini. In the semifinals, he lost in three sets against Roberto Bautista Agut after leading much of the match and missing a match point. He began the Australian Open by winning in four sets against Marcos Baghdatis, then beat the young Australian Omar Jasika in three sets before overcoming compatriot Pierre-Hugues Herbert, also in three sets. In the fourth round, he was defeated in three sets by seventh seed, Kei Nishikori.

Tsonga then played in the 2016 Argentina Open. Tsonga was beaten in the quarterfinals in straight sets by Nicolás Almagro. Following the Argentina Open, he played in the Rio Open, where he was beaten in the first round by No. 338 Thiago Monteiro. Tsonga represented France in the 2016 Davis Cup World Group First round where France beat Canada 5–0 and Tsonga beat Frank Dancevic (who retired during the match), and won the doubles alongside Richard Gasquet in straight sets. At the Indian Wells Masters he beat Vincent Millot, Sam Querrey and Dominic Thiem to reach the quarters, where he was beaten by No. 1 Novak Djokovic. In the Miami Masters, Tsonga was beaten in the third round by Roberto Bautista Agut.

At the Monte Carlo Masters, Tsonga made it to the semifinals stage, where he was beaten in straight sets by Gaël Monfils. In that quarterfinals, he beat third seed Roger Federer. This was his first top-10 win of the season. It was also the sixth time that he has beaten Federer in 17 matches. Tsonga was scheduled to play in the Estoril Open, but he withdrew with a knee injury. He played in the 2016 Madrid Open, where he was beaten in straight sets by Canadian Milos Raonic. He withdrew from the Italian Open with a muscle strain.

Tsonga, the sixth seed, retired with an adductor muscle injury from his French Open third-round match against Latvia's Ernests Gulbis when he was leading 5–2 in the first set. This injury also forced Tsonga to pull out of the 2016 Aegon Championships. Tsonga took part in Wimbledon, where he lost in the quarterfinals to the second seed Andy Murray in five sets, after holding three set points in the first set and having a break point at the start of the final set.

After helping France to a Davis Cup win against the Czech Republic, Tsonga crashed out in the second round of the Rio Olympics. This was followed by a surprise round of 16 loss to Steve Johnson in Cincinnati. The US Open saw a turn in form for Tsonga, reaching the quarterfinals, following wins against Guido Andreozzi, James Duckworth, Kevin Anderson and Jack Sock. Tsonga eventually succumbed to injury and fatigue against Djokovic, having lost the first two sets comfortably. At Shanghai, he lost in two tight sets in the quarterfinals to Bautista Agut, then he reached the final in Vienna, falling short against No. 2 Andy Murray, and finally had a quarterfinal loss to Milos Raonic at the Paris Masters. Tsonga ended the season ranked No. 12.

=== 2017: Four titles and Davis Cup win ===
At the Australian Open, Tsonga defeated No. 23 seed Jack Sock and unseeded Dan Evans in the third and fourth rounds respectively, both in four sets. He then fell to No. 4-seeded Stan Wawrinka in the quarterfinals in straight sets, marking Tsonga's best result at the tournament since his 2013 quarterfinal run.

In February, Tsonga won the Rotterdam singles title, beating David Goffin in the final in three sets to earn his first ATP World Tour singles title since the 2015 Moselle Open in Metz in September 2015. Seven days later, Tsonga won his 14th career (and his second of the year) ATP World Tour singles title by defeating Lucas Pouille in the singles final of the Open 13 to become the Open 13 singles champion for a record third time.

Struggles with injury and the birth of Tsonga's first child had a significant impact on Tsonga's activity in the ensuing months. A first round loss to Fabio Fognini in Indian Wells, withdrawal from the Miami Masters, a second round loss in Monte Carlo to compatriot Adrian Mannarino, a second round withdrawal in Madrid and withdrawal from the Rome Masters were huge setbacks after an exciting start to the year.

However, the end of May saw a return to winning ways for Tsonga as he cruised to a third ATP World Tour singles title of the season in Lyon. Wins over Carlos Berlocq, Karen Khachanov and Nikoloz Basilashvili set up a final against perennial foe Tomáš Berdych. A straight sets win saw Tsonga lift his first career ATP World Tour singles title on clay, as he improved to a 15–11 record in ATP World Tour finals. After struggling to string wins over the summer and the early autumn, Tsonga returned to the winner's circle in October, defeating Diego Schwartzman in straight sets to capture his fourth ATP World Tour singles title of the year at the European Open in Antwerp. In November, Tsonga along with Lucas Pouille, Pierre-Hugues Herbert and Richard Gasquet helped France to capture their 10th Davis Cup and first in 16 years. Tsonga won his first singles match against Steve Darcis but lost his second singles match against David Goffin in the Davis Cup final against Belgium; France won the tie with a score of 3–2.

=== 2018: Surgery, out of top 200, Davis Cup final ===
Tsonga played his first tournament of the year at the Australian Open, where he defeated Kevin King in straight sets and Denis Shapovalov (after being down 2–5 in the fifth set). In the third round, he faced Nick Kyrgios, who before the match referred to Tsonga as his 'idol'; Tsonga lost the match in four sets.

Tsonga was called up to play for France in the 2018 Davis Cup World Group first-round tie against the Netherlands, but he withdrew one day before the start of the first singles match because of a knee injury. At the Open Sud de France, Tsonga held two match points when he was leading 6–1, 5–3 against Lucas Pouille in the semifinals before Tsonga was forced to retire from the match because of a left hamstring injury with the score at 6–1, 5–5.

The Open Sud de France was Tsonga's second and last ATP World Tour tournament of the first four months of 2018. On 19 March, his ATP singles rankings fell to world no. 38, his lowest since he was ranked world no. 38 on 14 January 2008. Tsonga pulled out of five ATP World Tour tournaments that were to be held in February, March and April (Rotterdam, Marseille, Indian Wells, Miami and Monte-Carlo) due to injuries. He underwent left knee surgery on 3 April. Tsonga withdrew from the Masters 1000 tournaments in Madrid and Rome, the Lyon Open and the French Open because he had not recovered from his left knee surgery. On 28 May Tsonga was ranked outside the top 50 of the ATP singles rankings for the first time since 22 October 2007 when he was 22 years old. This was still due to his undergoing surgery earlier in the year on 3 April to repair a torn meniscus in his left knee that resulted in his not playing any tournaments for the next eight weeks. After missing three consecutive grand slam tournaments (French Open, Wimbledon and US Open) for the first time in his career, Tsonga finally made his return to competitive tennis at the ATP Tour 250 tournament in Metz held in September, where he lost his main draw first round match to Peter Gojowczyk. Tsonga won one and lost three singles matches in his next three events in Antwerp, Vienna and Paris. After the Paris Masters, he played just one more match, in the 2018 Davis Cup World Group final against Croatia; he lost the second singles rubber against Marin Čilić.

=== 2019: Two titles, Paris quarterfinal ===
Tsonga began the season with a semifinal appearance at the Brisbane Open where he lost to Daniil Medvedev. At the Australian Open, he lost to world number 1 Novak Djokovic in the second round in straight sets.

At the Open Sud de France, Tsonga won his first title since 2017 when he entered the tournament as a wildcard and defeated Pierre-Hugues Herbert in the final. He followed this up the next week with a quarterfinal appearance at the Rotterdam Open losing to Daniil Medvedev. The following week, he received a wildcard for the Open 13, where he fell again against a Russian youngster. This time it was against 21-year-old Andrey Rublev.

A month later, having skipped Indian Wells, Tsonga entered the qualifying round of the Miami Open, where he beat Lukas Rosol before losing in straight sets to Pablo Cuevas.

Tsonga started his clay season in Marrakech, playing the Grand Prix Hassan II. He beat Cedrik-Marcel Stebe, Kyle Edmund and Lorenzo Sonego without dropping a set before losing to Benoit Paire in 3 sets in the semifinals. He was then awarded a wildcard entry to the Monte-Carlo Masters where he lost the 1st set and retired in the 2nd of his 1st round match against Taylor Fritz.

Tsonga then returned to the ATP Challenger Tour for the first time since winning the Surbiton Trophy in June 2007. He entered the 48-player draw of the Bordeaux Open and defeated Viktor Troicki and Hugo Nys before losing in the quarterfinals against Filip Horansky. After this performance, he returned to the top 100 for the 1st time since the previous October.

Next, Tsonga entered the ATP Masters 1000 tournament in Rome losing in the 1st round to Fabio Fognini in straight sets. In the following week, he entered the ATP 250 Lyon Open where he reached the quarterfinals by beating Dušan Lajović and Steven Diez in a match which took just short of 3 hours. He ultimately lost to Nikoloz Basilashvili in a double 6–4 match. He returned to the French Open with a 1st round win in 4 sets against Peter Gojowczyk. Since Tsonga wasn't seeded due to his ranking of 82nd in the world, he drew 7th seed Japanese Kei Nishikori in the 2nd round and, although the Frenchman won the 1st set, he fell short in the following 3 and exited the tournament.

Tsonga began his grass-court season the week following the French Open in Stuttgart, where he comfortably beat Mischa Zverev in the first round before losing to Milos Raonic in the 2nd round in a tightly contested 3-setter with two tiebreaks. He then played the ATP 500 Halle Open, where he beat Benoît Paire in two tight sets, before facing his rival and at that time 9-time champion of the tournament Roger Federer in the 2nd round. Despite the heavy favoritism of the Swiss, Tsonga had a great performance, forcing a tiebreak, in the 1st set, that he lost by 7–5, winning the 2nd set 6–4 and only succumbing by 7–5 in the 3rd. Federer went on to win his record 10th title in Halle. Tsonga made the third round of Wimbledon, after straight-set wins over Bernard Tomic and Ričardas Berankis, and lost in straight sets to world number 2 Rafael Nadal.

Tsonga defeated world number 8 Karen Khachanov in the second round of the Washington Open to register his first win over a top-10 player in almost two years. He lost in the next round to Kyle Edmund in straight sets.

In September, Tsonga won his second title of the year at the Moselle Open defeating Aljaž Bedene in the final. Tsonga's last individual event of the year was the Paris Masters in October. As a wildcard, he made it to the quarterfinals defeating world number 9 Matteo Berrettini along the way. He played Rafael Nadal and lost in straight sets.

At the end of 2019, Tsonga's ranking had jumped from 239 at the beginning of the year to 29 at the end.

=== 2020: Inactivity due to COVID-19 ===
Tsonga played only two matches in 2020. The first one came at the Qatar Open where he went in as the 3rd seed and lost to Miomir Kecmanović in the first round. The second one came at the Australian Open where he went in as the 28th seed and lost to Alexei Popyrin in the first round.

After the COVID-19 pandemic had shut down tennis in March, Tsonga decided to remain inactive for the rest of 2020, even when tennis came back in August.

=== 2021: More struggles with injuries ===
Tsonga returned to the tour at the Open Sud de France where he lost in the first round to Sebastian Korda in straight sets. He recorded his first win of the year at the Open 13 where he defeated Feliciano López in straight sets but lost in the next round to 4th seed Ugo Humbert in straight sets.

At the Dubai Open, Tsonga sustained an arm injury in his first round match against Malek Jaziri and retired after just six games. The injury would affect his results for the rest of the year.

Tsonga played his last match of the year at Wimbledon where he lost in the first round in five sets against Mikael Ymer. He was unable to return to action during the season due to injury.

Throughout 2021, Tsonga compiled a win–loss record of 1–8.

=== 2022: Brief return, retirement ===
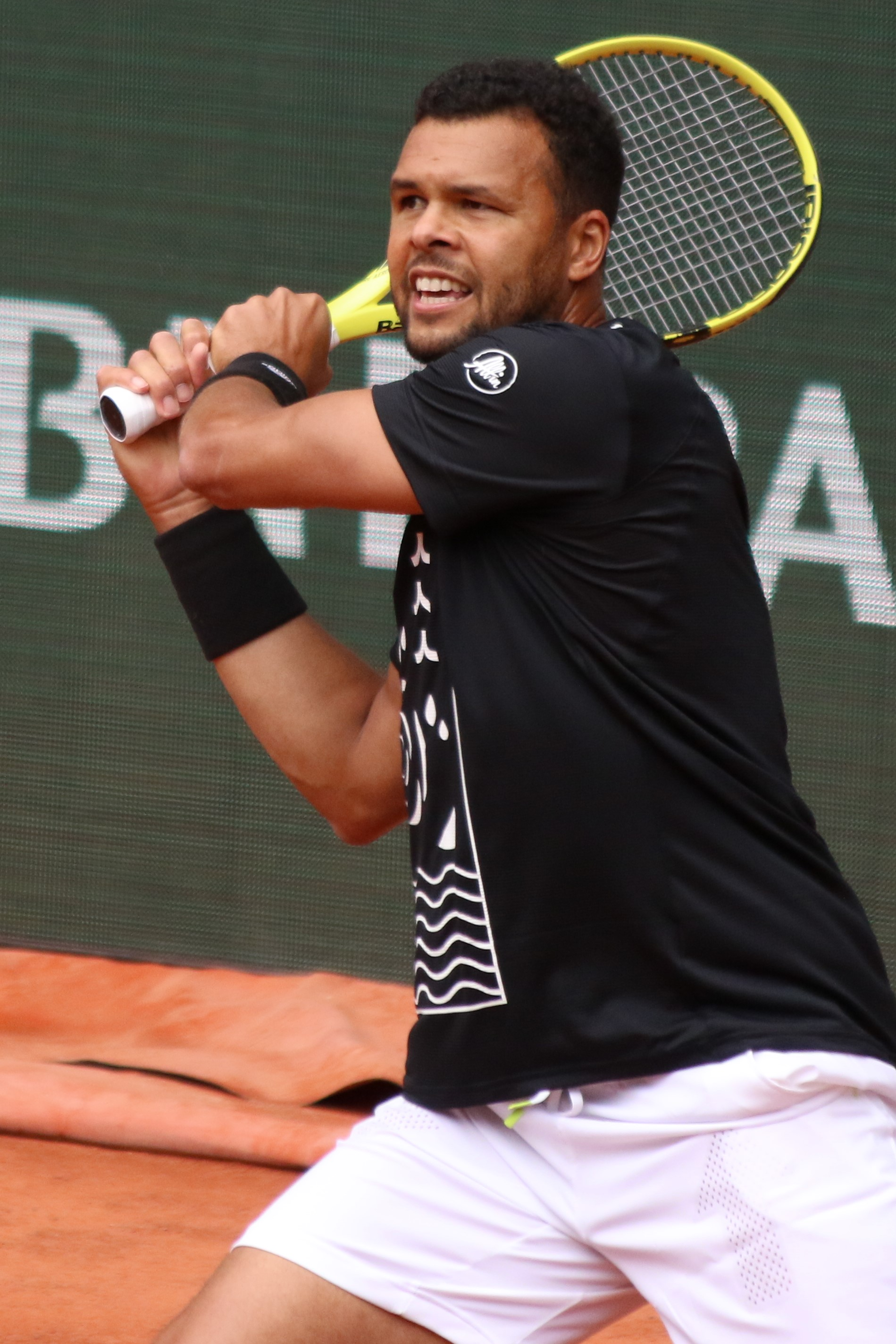
Tsonga at the 2022 French Open, his last professional tournament

Tsonga returned to the tour in February at the Open Sud de France using his protected ranking and won in the first round against Kacper Żuk in straight sets before losing to Filip Krajinović in the next round. He also advanced to the second round in the doubles tournament with partner Fabrice Martin by defeating Lucas Pouille and Albano Olivetti in the first round before succumbing in the following round to Jonathan Erlich and Édouard Roger-Vasselin.

On 6 April 2022, Tsonga announced that he would retire at the 2022 French Open. He played his last match on 24 May against Casper Ruud in the first round, which he lost in four sets.

== Rivalries ==
=== Tsonga vs. Djokovic ===
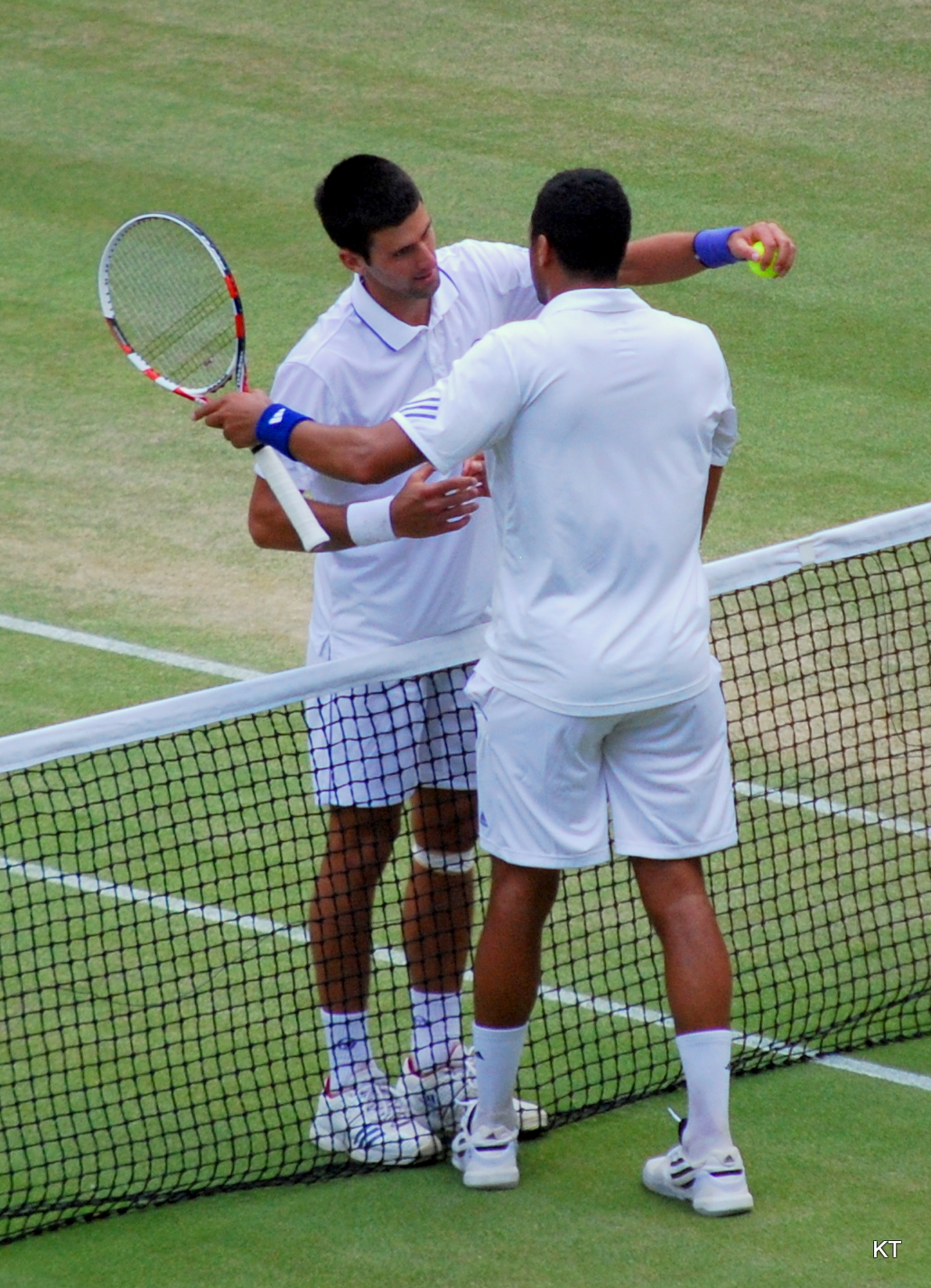
Tsonga and Djokovic at the 2011 Wimbledon Championships; the latter won their semifinal clash and went on to win the tournament.

Tsonga's most famous rivalry is perhaps against Novak Djokovic. They have met 23 times with Djokovic leading 17–6, including 7–1 in the majors. Their first meeting was in the final of the 2008 Australian; Djokovic and Tsonga had defeated the top two players, Roger Federer and Rafael Nadal in their respective semifinals in straight sets. Djokovic won the final in four sets to claim his first major title. Tsonga then won their next four meetings, before Djokovic stopped the streak at Miami in 2009.

Their next meeting at a Grand Slam was again at the Australian Open, in the 2010 quarterfinals, exactly two years to the day since Djokovic defeated him to win his first Grand Slam singles title. However, this time it was Tsonga who prevailed, winning in five sets after Djokovic fell ill during the match. It was not until another year and a half until they met again, with the stakes even higher, in the semifinals at Wimbledon in 2011, with the winner advancing to his first Wimbledon final. It was their first meeting on grass, and Djokovic prevailed in four sets to advance to his first Wimbledon final, and in the process ending the seven-and-a-half-year reign of Roger Federer and Rafael Nadal at the top of the rankings. At the 2012 French Open, Tsonga and Djokovic met again in an important match, in the quarterfinals. After losing the first set, he rallied to take the next two sets and held two match points on Djokovic's serve in the fourth set before the Serb fought back to force a tie-break. Despite Tsonga's saving set points in the breaker, Djokovic took one at the third opportunity. This forced a deciding set, which Tsonga lost after more than four hours of play.

They met again two months later at the Olympics, with Tsonga losing in straight sets in the quarterfinals. They met in the final of the 2012 China Open, with Tsonga again losing in straight sets. The pair were drawn in the same pool for the 2012 ATP World Tour Finals. Tsonga lost his first (of three) round-robin matches to Djokovic. It was his fifth loss to Djokovic in 2012.

They then met in the third round of the 2014 Rogers Cup, with Tsonga scoring his first win over Djokovic since the 2010 Australian Open with a straight-set victory. Prior to this victory, he had lost his last nine matches and 18 sets to Djokovic. They met again in the quarterfinals of the 2016 US Open, where Tsonga lost on a retirement after losing the first two sets.

After two-and-a-half-years they met again in the second round of the 2019 Australian Open, where Djokovic won in straight sets.

=== Tsonga vs. Federer ===
Tsonga and Roger Federer have played 18 times, with Federer leading 12–6. They have met six times in Grand Slam tournaments with Federer leading 4–2; including their five-set matches in the quarterfinals of 2011 Wimbledon and 2013 Australian Open. Tsonga's victory at 2011 Wimbledon saw him become the first man in Grand Slam history to defeat Federer after dropping the first two sets. Tsonga's other victory over Federer at a Major came in straight sets in the quarter-finals of the 2013 French Open. They have also one Grand Slam semifinal meeting in the 2010 Australian Open, with Federer winning in straight sets.

They have played in the 2011 ATP World Tour Finals final with Federer winning in three-sets. The pair have also met in two ATP World Tour Masters 1000 finals. The first was in the 2011 BNP Paribas Masters, with Federer winning his first title in Bercy, and the second was in the 2014 Rogers Cup, with Tsonga winning his second Masters 1000 title.

Their most recent meeting came at the 2019 Halle Open, with Federer defeating Tsonga in 3 tight sets.

=== Tsonga vs. Big Four ===
There are a number of achievements that Tsonga has attained over the Big Four of tennis.

- Tsonga, Tomáš Berdych and Stan Wawrinka are the only people to have beaten all four members of the Big Four at least once at a major.
- Tsonga and David Nalbandian are the only two players (other than members of the Big Four) to have beaten three members of it at a single tournament. (Tsonga defeated Djokovic in the round of 16, Murray in the quarterfinals, and Federer in the final to win the 2014 Canada Masters).
- Tsonga is one of seven players to win a tournament in which all members of the Big Four played (2008 Paris Masters).
- Tsonga, Andy Murray and Juan Martín del Potro are the only players to defeat Federer, Nadal and Djokovic at least once while they held the world No. 1 ranking.

== Playing style ==
Tsonga was known for his offensive baseline style of play but was also able to mix his style of play up by rushing to the net. His movement around the court was considered to be very good, considering his height. Tsonga is also known for his ability to serve well under pressure, having saved 67% of the break points he faced in his career. His two weaknesses were his return of serve and to a lesser extent his backhand.

=== Serve ===
Tsonga's serve is one of his fastest, strongest and most dominant shots, mixing both slice and speed, enabling him to create and win easier points, such as an ace or a one-two-punch. Because of the action of his serve, which is dramatically abbreviated, he does very well to create as much power as he does, with speeds of up to 237 km/h (147 mph).

=== Surfaces ===
Tsonga has achieved his best results on hard courts, most notably on the former Plexicushion Prestige surface at the Australian Open, where he made the final in 2008, the semifinals in 2010, and the quarterfinals in 2009, 2013, and 2017. In his career on the ATP circuit, the majority of his final appearances have come on hard courts. On grass, he reached the semifinals at Wimbledon in 2011 and 2012 and the quarterfinals in 2010 and 2016; he also reached the final of the Queen's Club Championships in 2011. In general, Tsonga has struggled on clay, although his clay-court skills improved as his career progressed, as evidenced by his 2012 season, where he reached the quarterfinals at the French Open, Monte-Carlo, and Rome. In 2013, he reached the two first clay court semifinals of his career, first at the 2013 Monte-Carlo Rolex Masters, where he lost to Rafael Nadal, and at the 2013 French Open, where he lost to David Ferrer after beating No. 3 Roger Federer in the quarterfinals. He won his first clay-court tournament at the 2017 Lyon Open.

=== Ground strokes and net-play ===
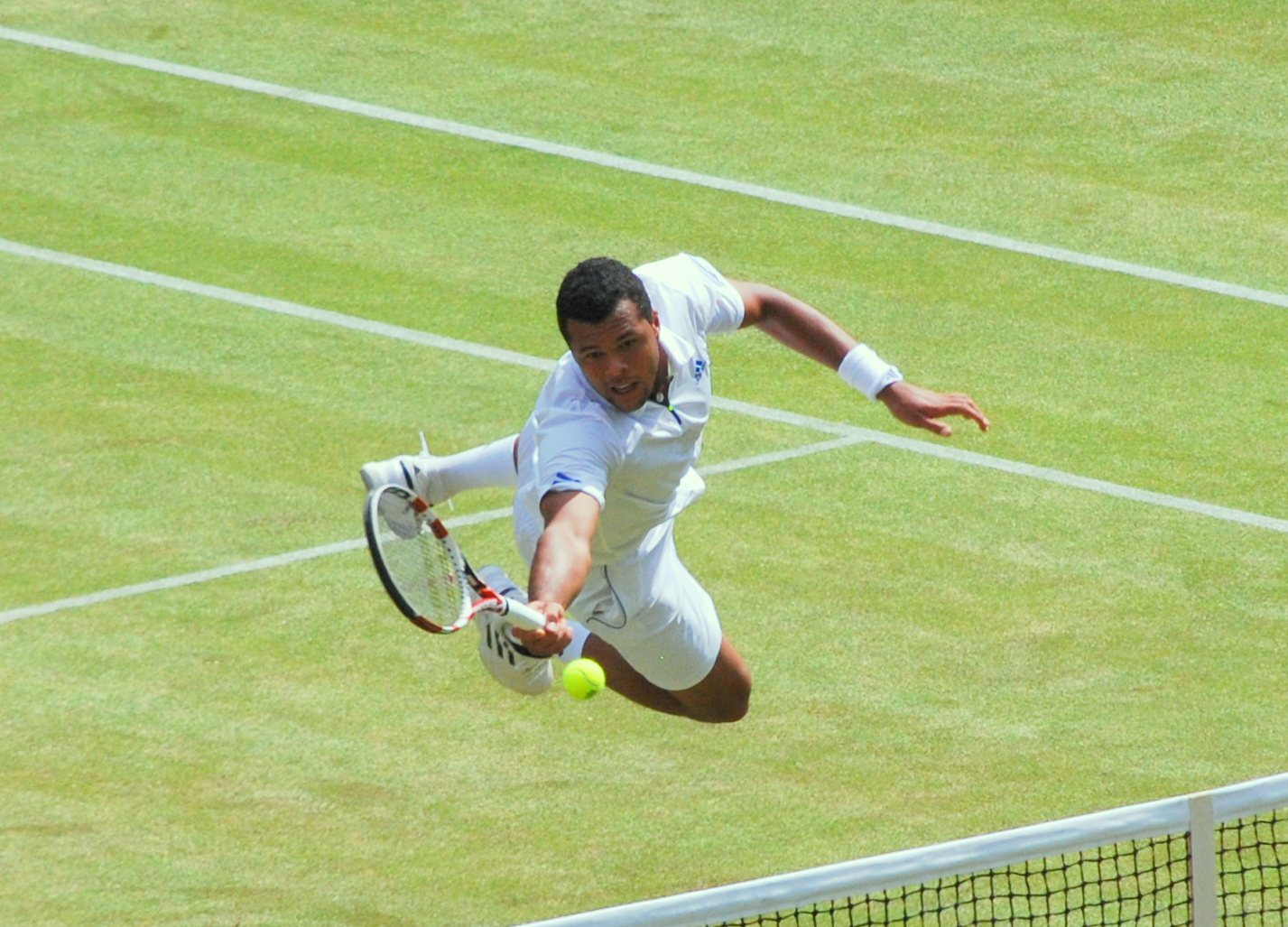
Tsonga playing a lunging dive volley against Novak Djokovic in their 2011 Wimbledon semifinal

Tsonga is known for his aggressive groundstrokes. His forehand and backhand are both effective in setting up points. His powerful, heavy and accurate forehand is his most consistent shot, especially when delivered down the line. Although his backhand is generally not as strong as his forehand during the rallies, he is very capable of hitting attacking shots on his backhand wing. His net play is skillful, especially on attack. He can play both two-handed and one-handed backhand. He added the one-handed backhand to his repertoire midway through 2011, as was evident in his matches against Andy Murray in the final of Queen's Club and against Federer in the quarterfinals of Wimbledon. Although rarely used as a groundstroke in a neutral rally, it is particularly effective as a passing shot down the line or cross-court.

== Equipment ==
During the off-season in 2009, Tsonga switched rackets from Wilson to Babolat. He was using Babolat AeroPro Drive+ racket, but in July 2018, changed to the Babolat Pure Strike. His strings are LUXiLON Alu Power Rough strings. He is sponsored by Adidas for his attire.

== Career statistics ==
=== Grand Slam tournament performance timeline ===
Key
| W | F | SF | QF | #R | RR | Q# | P# | DNQ | A | Z# | PO | G | S | B | NMS | NTI | P | NH |

(W) winner; (F) finalist; (SF) semifinalist; (QF) quarterfinalist; (#R) rounds 4, 3, 2, 1; (RR) round-robin stage; (Q#) qualification round; (P#) preliminary round; (DNQ) did not qualify; (A) absent; (Z#) Davis/Fed Cup Zonal Group (with number indication) or (PO) play-off; (G) gold, (S) silver or (B) bronze Olympic/Paralympic medal; (NMS) not a Masters tournament; (NTI) not a Tier I tournament; (P) postponed; (NH) not held; (SR) strike rate (events won / competed); (W–L) win–loss record.
To avoid confusion and double counting, these charts are updated at the conclusion of a tournament or when the player's participation has ended.

| Tournament | 2004 | 2005 | 2006 | 2007 | 2008 | 2009 | 2010 | 2011 | 2012 | 2013 | 2014 | 2015 | 2016 | 2017 | 2018 | 2019 | 2020 | 2021 | 2022 | SR | W–L | Win% |
|---|---|---|---|---|---|---|---|---|---|---|---|---|---|---|---|---|---|---|---|---|---|---|
| Australian Open | A | A | A | 1R | F | QF | SF | 3R | 4R | QF | 4R | A | 4R | QF | 3R | 2R | 1R | A | A | 0 / 13 | 37–13 | 74% |
| French Open | Q2 | 1R | A | A | A | 4R | 4R | 3R | QF | SF | 4R | SF | 3R | 1R | A | 2R | A | 1R | 1R | 0 / 13 | 28–13 | 68% |
| Wimbledon | A | A | A | 4R | A | 3R | QF | SF | SF | 2R | 4R | 3R | QF | 3R | A | 3R | NH | 1R | A | 0 / 12 | 32–12 | 73% |
| US Open | Q2 | A | A | 3R | 3R | 4R | A | QF | 2R | A | 4R | QF | QF | 2R | A | 1R | A | A | A | 0 / 10 | 24–10 | 71% |
| Win–loss | 0–0 | 0–1 | 0–0 | 5–3 | 8–2 | 11–4 | 12–3 | 13–4 | 13–4 | 10–3 | 12–4 | 11–3 | 13–4 | 7–4 | 2–1 | 4–4 | 0–1 | 0–2 | 0–1 | 0 / 48 | 121–48 | 72% |

=== Grand Slam finals ===
==== Singles: 1 (1 runner-up) ====
| Result | Year | Tournament | Surface | Opponent | Score |
|---|---|---|---|---|---|
| Loss | 2008 | Australian Open | Hard | (Serbia) Novak Djokovic | 6–4, 4–6, 3–6, 6–7^{(2–7)} |

=== Year-end championship finals ===
==== Singles: 1 (1 runner-up) ====
| Result | Year | Tournament | Surface | Opponent | Score |
|---|---|---|---|---|---|
| Loss | 2011 | ATP Tour finals, London | Hard (i) | (Switzerland) Roger Federer | 3–6, 7–6^{(8–6)}, 3–6 |

=== Masters 1000 finals ===
==== Singles: 4 (2 titles, 2 runner-ups) ====
| Result | Year | Tournament | Surface | Opponent | Score |
|---|---|---|---|---|---|
| Win | 2008 | Paris Masters | Hard (i) | (Argentina) David Nalbandian | 6–3, 4–6, 6–4 |
| Loss | 2011 | Paris Masters | Hard (i) | (Switzerland) Roger Federer | 1–6, 6–7^{(3–7)} |
| Win | 2014 | Canadian Open | Hard | (Switzerland) Roger Federer | 7–5, 7–6^{(7–3)} |
| Loss | 2015 | Shanghai Masters | Hard | (Serbia) Novak Djokovic | 2–6, 4–6 |

==== Doubles: 1 (1 title) ====
| Result | Year | Tournament | Surface | Partner | Opponents | Score |
|---|---|---|---|---|---|---|
| Win | 2009 | Shanghai Masters | Hard | (France) Julien Benneteau | (Poland) Mariusz Fyrstenberg (Poland) Marcin Matkowski | 6–2, 6–4 |

=== Olympic finals ===
==== Doubles: 1 (1 silver medal) ====
| Result | Year | Tournament | Surface | Partner | Opponents | Score |
|---|---|---|---|---|---|---|
| Silver | 2012 | Summer Olympics London | Grass | (France) Michaël Llodra | (United States) Bob Bryan (United States) Mike Bryan | 4–6, 6–7^{(2–7)} |

== Explanatory notes ==
Awards
| Preceded by Benjamin Becker | ATP Newcomer of the Year; 2007 | Succeeded by Kei Nishikori |
