= Luis-Manuel Flores =

Mexican tennis player

- Country (sports): Mexico
- Residence: Xalapa, Mexico
- Born: 1 February 1985 (age 41) Xalapa, Mexico
- Height: 1.88 m (6.2 ft)
- Turned pro: 2003
- Plays: Left-handed
- Prize money: $36,731

Singles
- Career record: 3-1 (including Davis Cup and Challengers)
- Highest ranking: No. 423 (29 September 2008)

Doubles
- Career record: 1-2
- Career titles: 0
- Highest ranking: No. 629 (11 Octocter 2004)

Luis-Manuel Flores (Spanish pronunciation: [lwis maˈnwel ˈfloɾes]; born 1 February 1985) is a Mexican professional tennis player. He reached a career high ranking of 423 in September 2008. He began playing in the Mexico Davis Cup team in 2003. He is coached by José Higueras.

== Davis Cup ==
American Group II
Round	Date	Opponents	Final match score	Venue	Surface	Match	Opponent	Rubber score
QF	7–9 February 2003	Netherlands Antilles	5–0	Aguascalientes	Carpet (i)	Singles 2	Elmar Gerth	6–2, 6–0, 6–2 (W)
QF	7–9 February 2003	Netherlands Antilles	5–0	Aguascalientes	Carpet (i)	Singles 5 (dead)	Leroy Tujeehut	6–1, 6–1 (W)
QF	6–8 February 2004	Jamaica	4–1	Kingston	Hard (o)	Singles 2	Ryan Russell	3–6, 6–1, 1–6, 4–6 (L)
QF	6–8 March 2009	Jamaica	5–0	Mexico City	Clay (o)	Doubles (with Santiago Gonzalez)	Johnson/Johnson	6–3, 6–1, 6–1 (W)
SR	10–12 July 2009	Venezuela	2–3	Maracaibo	Hard (o)	Doubles (with Santiago Gonzalez)	Luisi/Armas	7–6^{(10–8)},3–6, 4–6, 5–7 (L)
SR	10–12 July 2009	Venezuela	2–3	Maracaibo	Hard (o)	Singles 5 (dead)	Piero Luisi	4–6, 6–3, 6–3 (W)

Key
W	F	SF	QF	#R	RR	Q#	P#	DNQ	A	Z#	PO	G	S	B	NMS	NTI	P	NH

(W) winner; (F) finalist; (SF) semifinalist; (QF) quarterfinalist; (#R) rounds 4, 3, 2, 1; (RR) round-robin stage; (Q#) qualification round; (P#) preliminary round; (DNQ) did not qualify; (A) absent; (Z#) Davis/Fed Cup Zonal Group (with number indication) or (PO) play-off; (G) gold, (S) silver or (B) bronze Olympic/Paralympic medal; (NMS) not a Masters tournament; (NTI) not a Tier I tournament; (P) postponed; (NH) not held; (SR) strike rate (events won / competed); (W–L) win–loss record.
To avoid confusion and double counting, these charts are updated at the conclusion of a tournament or when the player's participation has ended.
