= Bruno Rosa =

Brazilian tennis player

- Country (sports): Brazil
- Born: 14 February 1986 (age 39); Florianópolis, Brazil
- Height: 5 ft 10 in (178 cm)
- Plays: Right-handed
- Prize money: $24,579

Singles
- Career record: 0–1 (Davis Cup)
- Highest ranking: No. 402 (20 Feb 2006)

Doubles
- Highest ranking: No. 813 (16 Oct 2006)

Bruno Rosa (born 14 February 1986) is a Brazilian former professional tennis player.

Born and raised in Florianópolis, Rosa competed well on the ITF Junior Circuit and made it to as high as eight in the rankings, raising hopes that he could be the next Gustavo Kuerten for Brazil. In 2004 he featured in a Davis Cup tie for his country against Venezuela in Caracas and lost his singles rubber to Kepler Orellana. Following a limited time on the professional tour, in which he amassed a best world ranking of 402 and won two Futures titles, he chose to pursue studies in the United States. He played collegiate tennis for Rice University and was a two-time All-American.

== ITF Futures titles ==
=== Singles: (2) ===
No.	Date	Tournament	Surface	Opponent	Score
1.	May 2005	Brazil F4, Piracicaba	Clay	(Brazil) Lucas Engel	5–7, 7–6^{(6)}, 6–3
2.	Sep 2005	Brazil F10, Florianópolis	Clay	(Brazil) Rogério Dutra Silva	2–6, 6–3, 6–1

== See also ==
- List of Brazil Davis Cup team representatives
