= Suk Hyun-joon =

South Korean tennis player

- Country (sports): South Korea
- Born: 9 June 1985 (age 39); Pohang, South Korea
- Plays: Right-handed

Singles
- Career record: 0–2 (Davis Cup)
- Highest ranking: No. 877 (13 Sep 2004)

Doubles
- Highest ranking: No. 1315 (14 May 2007)

Suk Hyun-joon (born 9 June 1985) is a South Korean former professional tennis player.

Suk, a native of Pohang, was ranked 11th on the ITF Junior Circuit. While a student at Myongji University he represented South Korea at the 2005 Summer Universiade. In 2005 he also played on the South Korea Davis Cup team for a tie against the Philippines in Manila. He is a former coach of Australian Open semi-finalist Chung Hyeon.

== See also ==
- List of South Korea Davis Cup team representatives
