= 2014 French Open – Women's singles qualifying =

Women's singles qualifying
- 2014 French Open

Events
Singles	men	women		boys	girls
Doubles	men	women	mixed	boys	girls
WC Singles	men	women	quad
WC Doubles	men	women	quad
Legends	−45	45+	women

Qualification
Singles	men	women
- French Open

== Seeds ==
1. (Romania) Irina-Camelia Begu (qualifying competition)
2. (United Kingdom) Heather Watson (qualified)
3. (Hungary) Tímea Babos (qualifying competition)
4. (United Kingdom) Johanna Konta (qualifying competition)
5. (Montenegro) Danka Kovinić (qualified)
6. (Chinese Taipei) Hsieh Su-wei (first round)
7. (Colombia) Mariana Duque (first round)
8. (Poland) Magda Linette (first round)
9. (Switzerland) Timea Bacsinszky (qualified)
10. (Russia) Alla Kudryavtseva (first round)
11. (Portugal) Michelle Larcher de Brito (qualified)
12. (Czech Republic) Kristýna Plíšková (first round)
13. (Czech Republic) Andrea Hlaváčková (first round)
14. (Serbia) Vesna Dolonc (qualifying competition)
15. (Spain) Lara Arruabarrena (first round)
16. (Australia) Olivia Rogowska (qualifying competition)
17. (United States) Victoria Duval (first round)
18. (Czech Republic) Lucie Hradecká (first round)
19. (Russia) Alexandra Panova (second round)
20. (United States) Grace Min (qualified)
21. (China) Zheng Saisai (second round)
22. (Slovenia) Tadeja Majerič (first round)
23. (Paraguay) Verónica Cepede Royg (first round)
24. (Sweden) Sofia Arvidsson (first round)

== Qualifiers ==
1. (United States) Grace Min
2. (United Kingdom) Heather Watson
3. (Ukraine) Maryna Zanevska
4. (Ukraine) Yuliya Beygelzimer
5. (Montenegro) Danka Kovinić
6. (Canada) Aleksandra Wozniak
7. (Netherlands) Kiki Bertens
8. (Russia) Ksenia Pervak
9. (Switzerland) Timea Bacsinszky
10. (Georgia (country)) Sofia Shapatava
11. (Portugal) Michelle Larcher de Brito
12. (Austria) Tamira Paszek

== Qualifying draw ==
Key

- Q = Qualifier
- WC = Wild card
- LL = Lucky loser
- Alt = Alternate
- ITF = ITF entry
- PR = Protected ranking
- SR = Special ranking
- SE = Special exempt
- JE = Junior exempt
- JR = Junior Accelerator Programme entrant
- CO = College Accelerator Programme entrant
- NG = Next Gen Accelerator Program entrant
- w/o = Walkover
- r = Retired
- d = Defaulted

=== First qualifier ===
First round
1	(Romania) Irina-Camelia Begu	6	6
(Japan) Misa Eguchi	2	2
WC	(Australia) Storm Sanders	3	1
(Serbia) Aleksandra Krunić	6	6
(Argentina) Florencia Molinero	3	1
(Japan) Ayumi Morita	6	6
(Czech Republic) Eva Birnerová	2	3
20	(United States) Grace Min	6	6

Second round
1	(Romania) Irina-Camelia Begu	6	6
(Serbia) Aleksandra Krunić	1	1
(Japan) Ayumi Morita	2	0
20	(United States) Grace Min	6	6

Qualifying competition
1	(Romania) Irina-Camelia Begu	4	0
20	(United States) Grace Min	6	6

=== Second qualifier ===
First round
2	(United Kingdom) Heather Watson	6	6
(United States) Irina Falconi	2	4
(Ukraine) Kateryna Kozlova	6	6
WC	(France) Estelle Cascino	4	1
(Estonia) Anett Kontaveit	6	7
WC	(France) Constance Sibille	4	5
(Canada) Gabriela Dabrowski	6	7
23	(Paraguay) Verónica Cepede Royg	3	5

Second round
2	(United Kingdom) Heather Watson	4	6	7
(Ukraine) Kateryna Kozlova	6	2	5
(Estonia) Anett Kontaveit	7	6
(Canada) Gabriela Dabrowski	5	2

Qualifying competition
2	(United Kingdom) Heather Watson	6	6
(Estonia) Anett Kontaveit	1	1

=== Third qualifier ===
First round
3	(Hungary) Tímea Babos	6	7
(Argentina) María Irigoyen	2	5
(Netherlands) Indy de Vroome	6	6
PR	(Ukraine) Kateryna Bondarenko	2	2
(Latvia) Diāna Marcinkēviča	0	0
(Ukraine) Maryna Zanevska	6	6
(Italy) Nastassja Burnett	1	7	4
21	(China) Zheng Saisai	6	5	6

Second round
3	(Hungary) Tímea Babos	7^{8}	6
(Netherlands) Indy de Vroome	6^{6}	3
(Ukraine) Maryna Zanevska	5	6	6
21	(China) Zheng Saisai	7	2	3

Qualifying competition
3	(Hungary) Tímea Babos	5	2
(Ukraine) Maryna Zanevska	7	6

=== Fourth qualifier ===
First round
4	(United Kingdom) Johanna Konta	6	6
(United States) Sachia Vickery	2	3
(United States) Madison Brengle	3	6	6
(Poland) Paula Kania	6	1	8
(Belgium) An-Sophie Mestach	0^{r}
(Ukraine) Yuliya Beygelzimer	0
(United States) Nicole Gibbs	3	6	6
19	(Russia) Alexandra Panova	6	1	8

Second round
4	(United Kingdom) Johanna Konta	6	2	6
(Poland) Paula Kania	4	6	3
(Ukraine) Yuliya Beygelzimer	6	7^{10}
19	(Russia) Alexandra Panova	4	6^{8}

Qualifying competition
4	(United Kingdom) Johanna Konta	7^{7}	5	0
(Ukraine) Yuliya Beygelzimer	6^{5}	7	6

=== Fifth qualifier ===
First round
5	(Montenegro) Danka Kovinić	6	5	6
WC	(France) Stéphanie Foretz Gacon	3	7	0
(Japan) Erika Sema	6^{2}	4
(Croatia) Ana Konjuh	7^{7}	6
(Spain) Anabel Medina Garrigues	6	5	6
WC	(France) Jade Suvrijn	2	7	3
(Czech Republic) Tereza Smitková	6	7^{7}
17	(United States) Victoria Duval	3	6^{4}

Second round
5	(Montenegro) Danka Kovinić	6	6
(Croatia) Ana Konjuh	2	3
(Spain) Anabel Medina Garrigues	5	1
(Czech Republic) Tereza Smitková	7	6

Qualifying competition
5	(Montenegro) Danka Kovinić	6	4	6
(Czech Republic) Tereza Smitková	0	6	1

=== Sixth qualifier ===
First round
6	(Chinese Taipei) Hsieh Su-wei	5	6	5
(Turkey) Çağla Büyükakçay	7	2	7
(Italy) Alberta Brianti	2	6	6
PR	(Russia) Evgeniya Rodina	6	2	1
(Canada) Aleksandra Wozniak	6	6
(Austria) Melanie Klaffner	4	1
(Romania) Alexandra Dulgheru	6	6^{3}	7
15	(Spain) Lara Arruabarrena	3	7^{7}	5

Second round
(Turkey) Çağla Büyükakçay	6	5	10
(Italy) Alberta Brianti	3	7	8
(Canada) Aleksandra Wozniak	6	6
(Romania) Alexandra Dulgheru	4	3

Qualifying competition
(Turkey) Çağla Büyükakçay	4	4
(Canada) Aleksandra Wozniak	6	6

=== Seventh qualifier ===
First round
7	(Colombia) Mariana Duque	2	4
(Kazakhstan) Yulia Putintseva	6	6
(Japan) Eri Hozumi	1	6	6
(Switzerland) Viktorija Golubic	6	2	2
(United States) Melanie Oudin	6	3	7
WC	(France) Manon Arcangioli	3	6	5
(Netherlands) Kiki Bertens	6	6
18	(Czech Republic) Lucie Hradecká	1	2

Second round
(Kazakhstan) Yulia Putintseva	6	6
(Japan) Eri Hozumi	0	4
(United States) Melanie Oudin	1	0
(Netherlands) Kiki Bertens	6	6

Qualifying competition
(Kazakhstan) Yulia Putintseva	1	3
(Netherlands) Kiki Bertens	6	6

=== Eighth qualifier ===
First round
8	(Poland) Magda Linette	3	7^{7}	3
(Russia) Ksenia Pervak	6	6^{2}	6
(France) Irena Pavlovic	6	1	6
(Russia) Marta Sirotkina	2	6	0
(South Africa) Chanel Simmonds	2	3
PR	(Australia) Jarmila Gajdošová	6	6
(Japan) Mayo Hibi	0	6^{4}
14	(Serbia) Vesna Dolonc	6	7^{7}

Second round
(Russia) Ksenia Pervak	3	6	6
(France) Irena Pavlovic	6	1	4
PR	(Australia) Jarmila Gajdošová	6	3	0
14	(Serbia) Vesna Dolonc	1	6	6

Qualifying competition
(Russia) Ksenia Pervak	6	5	6
14	(Serbia) Vesna Dolonc	4	7	2

=== Ninth qualifier ===
First round
9	(Switzerland) Timea Bacsinszky	6	6
(Netherlands) Richèl Hogenkamp	3	2
(Netherlands) Arantxa Rus	6	4	6
(Ukraine) Lyudmyla Kichenok	2	6	2
(Kazakhstan) Sesil Karatantcheva	3	6	6
(Liechtenstein) Stephanie Vogt	6	4	2
(Germany) Laura Siegemund	6	3	6
13	(Czech Republic) Andrea Hlaváčková	4	6	1

Second round
9	(Switzerland) Timea Bacsinszky	6	6
(Netherlands) Arantxa Rus	3	0
(Kazakhstan) Sesil Karatantcheva	4	7^{8}	4
(Germany) Laura Siegemund	6	6^{6}	6

Qualifying competition
9	(Switzerland) Timea Bacsinszky	5	6	6
(Germany) Laura Siegemund	7	4	2

=== Tenth qualifier ===
First round
10	(Russia) Alla Kudryavtseva	6	4	2
(Georgia (country)) Sofia Shapatava	3	6	6
(Czech Republic) Renata Voráčová	4	7	6
WC	(France) Myrtille Georges	6	5	8
(Ukraine) Olga Savchuk	6	7
(Russia) Vera Dushevina	4	5
(Tunisia) Ons Jabeur	2	3
16	(Australia) Olivia Rogowska	6	6

Second round
(Georgia (country)) Sofia Shapatava	6	6
WC	(France) Myrtille Georges	2	4
(Ukraine) Olga Savchuk	2	3
16	(Australia) Olivia Rogowska	6	6

Qualifying competition
(Georgia (country)) Sofia Shapatava	3	7^{7}	6
16	(Australia) Olivia Rogowska	6	6^{4}	3

=== Eleventh qualifier ===
First round
11	(Portugal) Michelle Larcher de Brito	6	6
(Belarus) Aliaksandra Sasnovich	3	4
(Slovakia) Kristína Kučová	1	0
WC	(France) Irina Ramialison	6	6
(Russia) Polina Vinogradova	6	5	0
(United States) Allie Kiick	1	7	6
(Ukraine) Lesia Tsurenko	2	6	6
24	(Sweden) Sofia Arvidsson	6	0	4

Second round
11	(Portugal) Michelle Larcher de Brito	7	6
WC	(France) Irina Ramialison	5	0
(United States) Allie Kiick	6	7
(Ukraine) Lesia Tsurenko	4	5

Qualifying competition
11	(Portugal) Michelle Larcher de Brito	7	7
(United States) Allie Kiick	5	5

=== Twelfth qualifier ===
First round
12	(Czech Republic) Kristýna Plíšková	5	3
(Ukraine) Anastasiya Vasylyeva	7	6
(Germany) Carina Witthöft	4	7^{7}	6
(Japan) Risa Ozaki	6	6^{5}	4
(Austria) Tamira Paszek	6	7
(Romania) Andreea Mitu	2	5
(Czech Republic) Kateřina Siniaková	6	6
22	(Slovenia) Tadeja Majerič	2	0

Second round
(Ukraine) Anastasiya Vasylyeva	7	1	4
(Germany) Carina Witthöft	5	6	6
(Austria) Tamira Paszek	6	6
(Czech Republic) Kateřina Siniaková	2	4

Qualifying competition
(Germany) Carina Witthöft	0	1
(Austria) Tamira Paszek	6	6
