= 2014 French Open – Men's singles qualifying =

Men's singles qualifying
- 2014 French Open

Events
Singles	men	women		boys	girls
Doubles	men	women	mixed	boys	girls
WC Singles	men	women	quad
WC Doubles	men	women	quad
Legends	−45	45+	women

Qualification
Singles	men	women
- French Open

This article displays the qualifying draw for men's singles at the 2014 French Open.

== Seeds ==
1. (Italy) Paolo Lorenzi (qualified)
2. (Germany) Julian Reister (second round)
3. (Russia) Evgeny Donskoy (second round)
4. (Slovenia) Blaž Rola (qualifying competition)
5. (Japan) Go Soeda (first round, retired)
6. (Austria) Andreas Haider-Maurer (qualified)
7. (United States) Tim Smyczek (qualifying competition)
8. (Argentina) Diego Schwartzman (qualified)
9. (Germany) Peter Gojowczyk (second round, retired)
10. (Germany) Michael Berrer (second round)
11. (Tunisia) Malek Jaziri (second round)
12. (Russia) Andrey Kuznetsov (qualifying competition)
13. (United States) Denis Kudla (first round)
14. (Argentina) Guido Pella (second round)
15. (Slovenia) Blaž Kavčič (second round)
16. (Canada) Frank Dancevic (qualifying competition)
17. (Argentina) Horacio Zeballos (second round)
18. (Germany) Andreas Beck (qualified)
19. (Bosnia and Herzegovina) Damir Džumhur (qualified)
20. (Netherlands) Thiemo de Bakker (first round)
21. (United States) Ryan Harrison (second round)
22. (United Kingdom) Daniel Evans (first round)
23. (Japan) Tatsuma Ito (first round)
24. (Romania) Adrian Ungur (first round)
25. (Argentina) Máximo González (second round)
26. (Lithuania) Ričardas Berankis (qualifying competition, withdrew)
27. (Canada) Peter Polansky (qualified)
28. (Australia) Samuel Groth (qualifying competition)
29. (Japan) Yuichi Sugita (first round)
30. (Austria) Gerald Melzer (second round)
31. (Turkey) Marsel İlhan (second round)
32. (Argentina) Facundo Bagnis (qualified)

== Qualifiers ==
1. (Italy) Paolo Lorenzi
2. (Canada) Peter Polansky
3. (France) Laurent Lokoli
4. (United Kingdom) James Ward
5. (Croatia) Ante Pavić
6. (Austria) Andreas Haider-Maurer
7. (Slovakia) Miloslav Mečíř Jr.
8. (Argentina) Diego Schwartzman
9. (Italy) Simone Bolelli
10. (Bosnia and Herzegovina) Damir Džumhur
11. (Argentina) Facundo Bagnis
12. (Portugal) Gastão Elias
13. (Germany) Andreas Beck
14. (Italy) Andrea Arnaboldi
15. (Australia) James Duckworth
16. (Italy) Potito Starace

== Qualifying draw ==
Key

- Q = Qualifier
- WC = Wild card
- LL = Lucky loser
- Alt = Alternate
- ITF = ITF entry
- PR = Protected ranking
- SR = Special ranking
- SE = Special exempt
- JE = Junior exempt
- JR = Junior Accelerator Programme entrant
- CO = College Accelerator Programme entrant
- NG = Next Gen Accelerator Program entrant
- w/o = Walkover
- r = Retired
- d = Defaulted

=== First qualifier ===
First round
1	(Italy) Paolo Lorenzi	6	6
(Egypt) Mohamed Safwat	1	1
(Israel) Amir Weintraub	2	1
(United Kingdom) Daniel Cox	6	6
(Canada) Steven Diez	3	1
WC	(France) Mathias Bourgue	6	6
(Japan) Taro Daniel	3	2
25	(Argentina) Máximo González	6	6

Second round
1	(Italy) Paolo Lorenzi	6	7^{7}
(United Kingdom) Daniel Cox	3	6^{4}
WC	(France) Mathias Bourgue	7^{7}	6
25	(Argentina) Máximo González	6^{3}	1

Qualifying competition
1	(Italy) Paolo Lorenzi	6	6^{3}	6
WC	(France) Mathias Bourgue	3	7^{7}	3

=== Second qualifier ===
First round
2	(Germany) Julian Reister	6	7
(China) Zhang Ze	0	5
WC	(France) Jonathan Eysseric	7	4	8
(Italy) Matteo Viola	5	6	6
(Czech Republic) Jan Mertl	6	6
(France) Maxime Teixeira	4	3
(United States) Austin Krajicek	2	1
27	(Canada) Peter Polansky	6	6

Second round
2	(Germany) Julian Reister	7^{7}	2	6
WC	(France) Jonathan Eysseric	6^{5}	6	8
(Czech Republic) Jan Mertl	3	6	4
27	(Canada) Peter Polansky	6	2	6

Qualifying competition
WC	(France) Jonathan Eysseric	6^{2}	1
27	(Canada) Peter Polansky	7^{7}	6

=== Third qualifier ===
First round
3	(Russia) Evgeny Donskoy	7^{8}	7^{7}
(Australia) Matt Reid	6^{6}	6^{5}
WC	(France) Laurent Lokoli	7	7
(Lithuania) Laurynas Grigelis	5	5
(Serbia) Filip Krajinović	7	4	8
WC	(France) Enzo Couacaud	5	6	6
(Italy) Lorenzo Giustino	6	4	6
23	(Japan) Tatsuma Ito	3	6	4

Second round
3	(Russia) Evgeny Donskoy	6	6^{1}	2
WC	(France) Laurent Lokoli	3	7^{7}	6
(Serbia) Filip Krajinović	6	6
(Italy) Lorenzo Giustino	4	3

Qualifying competition
WC	(France) Laurent Lokoli	7	7^{7}
(Serbia) Filip Krajinović	5	6^{4}

=== Fourth qualifier ===
First round
4	(Slovenia) Blaž Rola	6	6
(United States) Alex Kuznetsov	2	3
PR	(Spain) Iñigo Cervantes	6	6
(China) Wu Di	4	3
(United Kingdom) James Ward	6	7
(Moldova) Radu Albot	3	5
(France) David Guez	5	6^{2}
21	(United States) Ryan Harrison	7	7^{7}

Second round
4	(Slovenia) Blaž Rola	3	7^{7}	6
PR	(Spain) Iñigo Cervantes	6	6^{5}	2
(United Kingdom) James Ward	7^{7}	7^{7}
21	(United States) Ryan Harrison	6^{5}	6^{4}

Qualifying competition
4	(Slovenia) Blaž Rola	6	4	10
(United Kingdom) James Ward	4	6	12

=== Fifth qualifier ===
First round
5	(Japan) Go Soeda	7^{7}	0	1^{r}
(Croatia) Ante Pavić	6^{2}	6	4
(Romania) Marius Copil	6	7^{7}
(Romania) Victor Crivoi	4	6^{4}
WC	(Australia) Thanasi Kokkinakis	6	6
(Chinese Taipei) Yang Tsung-hua	1	2
(Belgium) Niels Desein	6	6
20	(Netherlands) Thiemo de Bakker	3	4

Second round
(Croatia) Ante Pavić	3	6	6
(Romania) Marius Copil	6	3	3
WC	(Australia) Thanasi Kokkinakis	6	6
(Belgium) Niels Desein	4	2

Qualifying competition
(Croatia) Ante Pavić	4	7^{7}	7
WC	(Australia) Thanasi Kokkinakis	6	6^{5}	5

=== Sixth qualifier ===
First round
6	(Austria) Andreas Haider-Maurer	6	6
PR	(Ecuador) Giovanni Lapentti	3	0
(Italy) Marco Cecchinato	6	6
(France) Grégoire Burquier	3	2
PR	(France) Éric Prodon	7^{7}	6
(Uzbekistan) Farrukh Dustov	6^{3}	3
(Japan) Hiroki Moriya	1	0
30	(Austria) Gerald Melzer	6	6

Second round
6	(Austria) Andreas Haider-Maurer	6	6
(Italy) Marco Cecchinato	2	3
PR	(France) Éric Prodon	4	6	13
30	(Austria) Gerald Melzer	6	1	11

Qualifying competition
6	(Austria) Andreas Haider-Maurer	6	6
PR	(France) Éric Prodon	0	1

=== Seventh qualifier ===
First round
7	(United States) Tim Smyczek	6	6
(Spain) Gerard Granollers	2	2
(Croatia) Toni Androić	4	6	3
WC	(France) Tristan Lamasine	6	3	6
(Slovakia) Miloslav Mečíř Jr.	6	6
(Spain) Enrique López-Pérez	4	4
(Czech Republic) Jaroslav Pospíšil	6	6^{5}	3
31	(Turkey) Marsel İlhan	3	7^{7}	6

Second round
7	(United States) Tim Smyczek	6	6
WC	(France) Tristan Lamasine	2	4
(Slovakia) Miloslav Mečíř Jr.	7^{7}	2	11
31	(Turkey) Marsel İlhan	6^{4}	6	9

Qualifying competition
7	(United States) Tim Smyczek	6^{4}	2
(Slovakia) Miloslav Mečíř Jr.	7^{7}	6

=== Eighth qualifier ===
First round
8	(Argentina) Diego Schwartzman	6^{4}	6	6
(France) Vincent Millot	7^{7}	1	1
(Argentina) Martín Alund	6	6
(Spain) Rubén Ramírez Hidalgo	4	2
(Serbia) Ilija Bozoljac	6^{2}	2
(Belgium) Kimmer Coppejans	7^{7}	6
(Belgium) Ruben Bemelmans	1	6	6
24	(Romania) Adrian Ungur	6	3	4

Second round
8	(Argentina) Diego Schwartzman	6	6
(Argentina) Martín Alund	2	2
(Belgium) Kimmer Coppejans	4	6	6
(Belgium) Ruben Bemelmans	6	2	2

Qualifying competition
8	(Argentina) Diego Schwartzman	6	6
(Belgium) Kimmer Coppejans	2	2

=== Ninth qualifier ===
First round
9	(Germany) Peter Gojowczyk	6	6
PR	(Ukraine) Sergei Bubka	2	2
(Italy) Simone Bolelli	6^{6}	6	3
(Russia) Alex Bogomolov Jr.	7^{8}	3	0^{r}
(Argentina) Juan Ignacio Londero	2	5
(Belgium) Maxime Authom	6	7
(Italy) Flavio Cipolla	6^{5}	3
28	(Australia) Samuel Groth	7^{7}	6

Second round
9	(Germany) Peter Gojowczyk	4	1^{r}
(Italy) Simone Bolelli	6	4
(Belgium) Maxime Authom	6	3	0^{r}
28	(Australia) Samuel Groth	4	6	3

Qualifying competition
(Italy) Simone Bolelli	6	6
28	(Australia) Samuel Groth	4	2

=== Tenth qualifier ===
First round
10	(Germany) Michael Berrer	6	5	6
(Spain) José Checa Calvo	3	7	3
(Brazil) André Ghem	6	6
(Germany) Matthias Bachinger	4	2
(Argentina) Andrea Collarini	1	0
(Chile) Hans Podlipnik	6	6
PR	(Spain) Óscar Hernández	1	4
19	(Bosnia and Herzegovina) Damir Džumhur	6	6

Second round
10	(Germany) Michael Berrer	3	6^{7}
(Brazil) André Ghem	6	7^{9}
(Chile) Hans Podlipnik	6	2	4
19	(Bosnia and Herzegovina) Damir Džumhur	4	6	6

Qualifying competition
(Brazil) André Ghem	6^{8}	2
19	(Bosnia and Herzegovina) Damir Džumhur	7^{10}	6

=== Eleventh qualifier ===
First round
11	(Tunisia) Malek Jaziri	7	3	8
WC	(France) Quentin Halys	5	6	6
(Italy) Thomas Fabbiano	2	0
(Netherlands) Jesse Huta Galung	6	6
(Czech Republic) Jan Hernych	4	3
(Brazil) Rogério Dutra da Silva	6	6
(Spain) Roberto Carballés Baena	3	3
32	(Argentina) Facundo Bagnis	6	6

Second round
11	(Tunisia) Malek Jaziri	3	3
(Netherlands) Jesse Huta Galung	6	6
(Brazil) Rogério Dutra da Silva	3	7^{7}	3
32	(Argentina) Facundo Bagnis	6	6^{3}	6

Qualifying competition
(Netherlands) Jesse Huta Galung	3	2
32	(Argentina) Facundo Bagnis	6	6

=== Twelfth qualifier ===
First round
12	(Russia) Andrey Kuznetsov	6	6
(Venezuela) David Souto	2	2
(United States) Jarmere Jenkins	1	2
(Slovakia) Andrej Martin	6	6
(Hungary) Márton Fucsovics	4	4
(Belarus) Uladzimir Ignatik	6	6
(Portugal) Gastão Elias	6	6
22	(United Kingdom) Daniel Evans	3	1

Second round
12	(Russia) Andrey Kuznetsov	6	6
(Slovakia) Andrej Martin	3	2
(Belarus) Uladzimir Ignatik	0	6	4
(Portugal) Gastão Elias	6	4	6

Qualifying competition
12	(Russia) Andrey Kuznetsov	6	2	9
(Portugal) Gastão Elias	3	6	11

=== Thirteenth qualifier ===
First round
13	(United States) Denis Kudla	2	2
(Argentina) Andrés Molteni	6	6
(Ecuador) Emilio Gómez	6	6^{5}	6
WC	(France) Tak Khunn Wang	1	7^{7}	1
(France) Marc Gicquel	3	6	6
(Spain) Adrián Menéndez-Maceiras	6	3	1
(Switzerland) Henri Laaksonen	3	4
18	(Germany) Andreas Beck	6	6

Second round
(Argentina) Andrés Molteni	7^{7}	6
(Ecuador) Emilio Gómez	6^{3}	4
(France) Marc Gicquel	3	1
18	(Germany) Andreas Beck	6	6

Qualifying competition
(Argentina) Andrés Molteni	6^{5}	4
18	(Germany) Andreas Beck	7^{7}	6

=== Fourteenth qualifier ===
First round
14	(Argentina) Guido Pella	7	4	6
(Belgium) Germain Gigounon	5	6	4
(Republic of Ireland) James McGee	6	2	6
(Slovakia) Norbert Gomboš	2	6	4
WC	(France) Johan Tatlot	3	5
(Italy) Andrea Arnaboldi	6	7
(Slovenia) Grega Žemlja	2	2
17	(Argentina) Horacio Zeballos	6	6

Second round
14	(Argentina) Guido Pella	4	1
(Republic of Ireland) James McGee	6	6
(Italy) Andrea Arnaboldi	4	6	6
17	(Argentina) Horacio Zeballos	6	4	1

Qualifying competition
(Republic of Ireland) James McGee	3	4
(Italy) Andrea Arnaboldi	6	6

=== Fifteenth qualifier ===
First round
15	(Slovenia) Blaž Kavčič	1	6	6
(Brazil) João Souza	6	4	2
(Ukraine) Illya Marchenko	6	3	4
(Australia) James Duckworth	4	6	6
(Switzerland) Marco Chiudinelli	1	1
(Germany) Tim Puetz	6	6
(Austria) Martin Fischer	4	6	3
26	(Lithuania) Ričardas Berankis	6	3	6

Second round
15	(Slovenia) Blaž Kavčič	6	5	3
(Australia) James Duckworth	3	7	6
(Germany) Tim Puetz	4	5
26	(Lithuania) Ričardas Berankis	6	7

Qualifying competition
(Australia) James Duckworth	w/o
26	(Lithuania) Ričardas Berankis

=== Sixteenth qualifier ===
First round
16	(Canada) Frank Dancevic	7	6
(Argentina) Agustín Velotti	5	4
(Germany) Mischa Zverev	0^{r}
(Croatia) Kristijan Mesaroš	2
(Portugal) Rui Machado	2	0
(Argentina) Guido Andreozzi	6	6
(Italy) Potito Starace	6	6
29	(Japan) Yūichi Sugita	4	2

Second round
16	(Canada) Frank Dancevic	6	6
(Croatia) Kristijan Mesaroš	2	3
(Argentina) Guido Andreozzi	3	0
(Italy) Potito Starace	6	6

Qualifying competition
16	(Canada) Frank Dancevic	4	5
(Italy) Potito Starace	6	7
