= 2014 French Open – Day-by-day summaries =

The 2014 French Open described in detail, in the form of day-by-day summaries.

== Day 1 (25 May) ==
- Schedule of play
- Seeds out:
  - Women's Singles: (Estonia) Kaia Kanepi [25]

Matches on main courts
Matches on Court Philippe Chatrier (Center Court)
Event	Winner	Loser	Score
Women's Singles 1st round	(Poland) Agnieszka Radwańska [3]	(China) Zhang Shuai	6–3, 6–0
Men's Singles 1st round	(Switzerland) Roger Federer [4]	(Slovakia) Lukáš Lacko	6–2, 6–4, 6–2
Women's Singles 1st round	(United States) Serena Williams [1]	(France) Alizé Lim [WC]	6–2, 6–1
Men's Singles 1st round	(France) Jo-Wilfried Tsonga [13]	(France) Édouard Roger-Vasselin	7–6^{(7–4)}, 7–5, 6–2
Matches on Court Suzanne Lenglen (Grandstand)
Event	Winner	Loser	Score
Men's Singles 1st round	(Canada) Milos Raonic [8]	(Australia) Nick Kyrgios [WC]	6–3, 7–6^{(7–1)}, 6–3
Women's Singles 1st round	(United States) Venus Williams [29]	(Switzerland) Belinda Bencic	6–4, 6–1
Men's Singles 1st round	(United States) John Isner [10]	(France) Pierre-Hugues Herbert [WC]	7–6^{(7–5)}, 7–6^{(7–4)}, 7–5
Women's Singles 1st round	(Germany) Angelique Kerber [8]	(Poland) Katarzyna Piter	6–3, 6–1
Matches on Court 1
Event	Winner	Loser	Score
Women's Singles 1st round	(Slovakia) Daniela Hantuchová [31]	(Serbia) Jovana Jakšić	2–6, 6–2, 6–4
Men's Singles 1st round	(Czech Republic) Tomáš Berdych [6]	(Canada) Peter Polansky [Q]	6–3, 6–4, 6–4
Women's Singles 1st round	(Austria) Yvonne Meusburger	(France) Amandine Hesse [WC]	3–6, 6–3, 6–4
Men's Singles 1st round	(France) Jérémy Chardy	(Spain) Daniel Gimeno Traver	7–5, 6–2, 6–2

== Day 2 (26 May) ==
Stan Wawrinka became the first man who won Australian Open to lose in the opening round in Roland Garros since Petr Korda in 1998.

- Schedule of play
- Seeds out:
  - Men's Singles: (Switzerland) Stan Wawrinka [3], (Japan) Kei Nishikori [9], (Canada) Vasek Pospisil [30]
  - Women's Singles: (Italy) Roberta Vinci [17]

Matches on main courts
Matches on Court Philippe Chatrier (Center Court)
Event	Winner	Loser	Score
Women's Singles 1st round	(Russia) Maria Sharapova [7]	(Russia) Ksenia Pervak [Q]	6–1, 6–2
Men's Singles 1st round	(Serbia) Novak Djokovic [2]	(Portugal) João Sousa	6–1, 6–2, 6–4
Women's Singles 1st round	(France) Alizé Cornet [20]	(Australia) Ashleigh Barty [WC]	6–2, 6–1
Men's Singles 1st round	(Spain) Guillermo García-López	(Switzerland) Stan Wawrinka [3]	6–4, 5–7, 6–2, 6–0
Matches on Court Suzanne Lenglen (Grandstand)
Event	Winner	Loser	Score
Women's Singles 1st round	(Slovakia) Dominika Cibulková [9]	(France) Virginie Razzano	7–5, 6–0
Men's Singles 1st round	(France) Gilles Simon [29]	(Croatia) Ante Pavić [Q]	6–1, 6–1, 6–3
Men's Singles 1st round	(Spain) Rafael Nadal [1]	(United States) Robby Ginepri [WC]	6–0, 6–3, 6–0
Women's Singles 1st round	(Czech Republic) Petra Kvitová [5]	(Kazakhstan) Zarina Diyas	7–5, 6–2
Matches on Court 1
Event	Winner	Loser	Score
Men's Singles 1st round	(Slovakia) Martin Kližan	(Japan) Kei Nishikori [9]	7–6^{(7–4)}, 6–1, 6–2
Men's Singles 1st round	(Argentina) Facundo Bagnis [Q]	(France) Julien Benneteau	6–1, 6–2, 1–6, 3–6, 18–16
Women's Singles 1st round	(United States) Sloane Stephens [15] vs (China) Peng Shuai		Cancelled

== Day 3 (27 May) ==
Li Na became the fourth woman who won Australian Open in the same year to lose in the opening round in Roland Garros.

- Schedule of play
- Seeds out:
  - Men's Singles: (Bulgaria) Grigor Dimitrov [11], (Germany) Tommy Haas [16], (Spain) Nicolás Almagro [21]
  - Women's Singles: (China) Li Na [2], (Denmark) Caroline Wozniacki [13], (Czech Republic) Klára Koukalová [30]
  - Men's Doubles: (Colombia) Juan Sebastián Cabal / (Colombia) Robert Farah [10]

Matches on main courts
Matches on Court Philippe Chatrier (Center Court)
Event	Winner	Loser	Score
Women's Singles 1st round	(Romania) Simona Halep [4]	(Russia) Alisa Kleybanova	6–0, 6–2
Men's Singles 1st round	(Spain) David Ferrer [5]	(Netherlands) Igor Sijsling	6–4, 6–3, 6–1
Women's Singles 1st round	(Serbia) Ana Ivanovic [11]	(France) Caroline Garcia	6–1, 6–3
Men's Singles 1st round	(France) Gaël Monfils [23]	(Romania) Victor Hănescu	6–2, 4–6, 6–4, 6–2
Matches on Court Suzanne Lenglen (Grandstand)
Event	Winner	Loser	Score
Women's Singles 1st round	(France) Kristina Mladenovic	(China) Li Na [2]	7–5, 3–6, 6–1
Men's Singles 1st round	(France) Richard Gasquet [12]	(Australia) Bernard Tomic	6–2, 6–1, 7–5
Men's Singles 1st round	(United Kingdom) Andy Murray [7]	(Kazakhstan) Andrey Golubev	6–1, 6–4, 3–6, 6–3
Women's Singles 1st round	(Italy) Sara Errani [10]	(United States) Madison Keys	7–5, 3–6, 6–1
Matches on Court 1
Event	Winner	Loser	Score
Men's Singles 1st round	(Croatia) Ivo Karlović	(Bulgaria) Grigor Dimitrov [11]	6–4, 7–5, 7–6^{(7–4)}
Women's Singles 1st round	(United States) Sloane Stephens [15]	(China) Peng Shuai	6–4, 7–6^{(10–8)}
Men's Singles 1st round	(Spain) Fernando Verdasco [24]	(France) Michaël Llodra [WC]	6–2, 7–6^{(7–4)}, 7–6^{(7–3)}
Women's Singles 1st round	(Czech Republic) Lucie Šafářová [23]	(Luxembourg) Mandy Minella	6–3, 7–5

== Day 4 (28 May) ==
- Schedule of play
- Seeds out:
  - Men's Singles: (Russia) Mikhail Youzhny [15], (Ukraine) Alexandr Dolgopolov [20]
  - Women's Singles: (United States) Serena Williams [1], (Italy) Flavia Pennetta [12], (Germany) Sabine Lisicki [16], (France) Alizé Cornet [20], (United States) Venus Williams [29], (Russia) Elena Vesnina [32]
  - Men's Doubles: (Poland) Mariusz Fyrstenberg / (Poland) Marcin Matkowski [8]
  - Women's Doubles: (Czech Republic) Andrea Hlaváčková / (Czech Republic) Lucie Šafářová [9], (Russia) Alla Kudryavtseva / (Australia) Anastasia Rodionova [10], (United States) Vania King / (China) Zheng Jie [13]

Matches on main courts
Matches on Court Philippe Chatrier (Center Court)
Event	Winner	Loser	Score
Women's Singles 2nd round	(Slovakia) Anna Karolína Schmiedlová	(United States) Venus Williams [29]	2–6, 6–3, 6–4
Men's Singles 2nd round	(Serbia) Novak Djokovic [2]	(France) Jérémy Chardy	6–1, 6–4, 6–2
Men's Singles 2nd round	(France) Jo-Wilfried Tsonga [13]	(Austria) Jürgen Melzer	6–2, 6–3, 6–4
Women's Singles 2nd round	(Russia) Maria Sharapova [7]	(Bulgaria) Tsvetana Pironkova	7–5, 6–2
Matches on Court Suzanne Lenglen (Grandstand)
Event	Winner	Loser	Score
Men's Singles 2nd round	(France) Gilles Simon [29]	(Colombia) Alejandro González	6–4, 6–0, 6–2
Women's Singles 2nd round	(Spain) Garbiñe Muguruza	(United States) Serena Williams [1]	6–2, 6–2
Men's Singles 2nd round	(Switzerland) Roger Federer [4]	(Argentina) Diego Sebastián Schwartzman [Q]	6–3, 6–4, 6–4
Women's Singles 2nd round	(United States) Taylor Townsend [WC]	(France) Alizé Cornet [20]	6–4, 4–6, 6–4
Matches on Court 1
Event	Winner	Loser	Score
Men's Singles 2nd round	(Spain) Roberto Bautista Agut [27]	(France) Benoît Paire	6–4, 7–6^{(7–4)}, 6–2
Men's Singles 2nd round	(Czech Republic) Tomáš Berdych [6]	(Kazakhstan) Aleksandr Nedovyesov	6–7^{(4–7)}, 6–4, 7–5, 6–3
Women's Singles 2nd round	(Slovakia) Daniela Hantuchová [31]	(France) Claire Feuerstein [WC]	6–1, 6–4
Women's Singles 2nd round	(Poland) Agnieszka Radwańska [3]	(Czech Republic) Karolína Plíšková	6–3, 6–4

== Day 5 (29 May) ==
- Schedule of play
- Seeds out:
  - Men's Singles: (Spain) Feliciano López [26]
  - Women's Singles: (Belgium) Kirsten Flipkens [21], (Russia) Anastasia Pavlyuchenkova [24]
  - Men's Doubles: (India) Rohan Bopanna / (Pakistan) Aisam-ul-Haq Qureshi [6]
  - Women's Doubles: (Germany) Julia Görges / (Germany) Anna-Lena Grönefeld [8], (Spain) Anabel Medina Garrigues / (Kazakhstan) Yaroslava Shvedova [11]
  - Mixed Doubles: (Czech Republic) Květa Peschke / (Poland) Marcin Matkowski [4]

Matches on main courts
Matches on Court Philippe Chatrier (Center Court)
Event	Winner	Loser	Score
Women's Singles 2nd round	(Serbia) Jelena Janković [6]	(Japan) Kurumi Nara	7–5, 6–0
Men's Singles 2nd round	(Spain) Rafael Nadal [1]	(Austria) Dominic Thiem	6–2, 6–2, 6–3
Men's Singles 2nd round	(France) Richard Gasquet [12]	(Argentina) Carlos Berlocq	7–6^{(7–5)}, 6–4, 6–4
Women's Singles 2nd round	(Serbia) Ana Ivanovic [11]	(Ukraine) Elina Svitolina	7–5, 6–2
Matches on Court Suzanne Lenglen (Grandstand)
Event	Winner	Loser	Score
Men's Singles 2nd round	(Spain) David Ferrer [5]	(Italy) Simone Bolelli	6–2, 6–3, 6–2
Women's Singles 2nd round	(France) Kristina Mladenovic	(United States) Alison Riske	7–6^{(7–5)}, 3–6, 6–3
Women's Singles 2nd round	(Czech Republic) Petra Kvitová [5]	(New Zealand) Marina Erakovic	6–4, 6–4
Men's Singles 2nd round	(France) Gaël Monfils [23]	(Germany) Jan-Lennard Struff	7–6^{(7–4)}, 6–4, 6–1
Matches on Court 1
Event	Winner	Loser	Score
Women's Singles 2nd round	(United States) Sloane Stephens [15]	(Slovenia) Polona Hercog	6–1, 6–3
Men's Singles 2nd round	(Spain) Guillermo García-López	(France) Adrian Mannarino	6–4, 6–3, 3–6, 6–0
Men's Singles 2nd round	(United Kingdom) Andy Murray [7]	(Australia) Marinko Matosevic	6–3, 6–1, 6–3
Women's Singles 2nd round	(Romania) Simona Halep [4]	(United Kingdom) Heather Watson [Q]	6–2, 6–4

== Day 6 (30 May) ==
- Schedule of play
- Seeds out:
  - Men's Singles: (Spain) Tommy Robredo [17], (Poland) Jerzy Janowicz [22], (Croatia) Marin Čilić [25], (Spain) Roberto Bautista Agut [27], (France) Gilles Simon [29], (Russia) Dmitry Tursunov [31]
  - Women's Singles: (Poland) Agnieszka Radwańska [3], (Slovakia) Dominika Cibulková [9], (Slovakia) Daniela Hantuchová [31]
  - Men's Doubles: (Austria) Alexander Peya / (Brazil) Bruno Soares [2], (Spain) David Marrero / (Spain) Fernando Verdasco [4], (Philippines) Treat Huey / (United Kingdom) Dominic Inglot [7], (United States) Eric Butorac / (South Africa) Raven Klaasen [14], (Uruguay) Pablo Cuevas / (Argentina) Horacio Zeballos [16]
  - Women's Doubles: (Czech Republic) Klára Koukalová / (Romania) Monica Niculescu [14]
  - Mixed Doubles: (Spain) Anabel Medina Garrigues / (Spain) David Marrero [7]

Matches on main courts
Matches on Court Philippe Chatrier (Center Court)
Event	Winner	Loser	Score
Women's Singles 3rd round	(Croatia) Ajla Tomljanović	(Poland) Agnieszka Radwańska [3]	6–4, 6–4
Men's Singles 3rd round	(Switzerland) Roger Federer [4]	(Russia) Dmitry Tursunov [31]	7–5, 6–7^{(7–9)}, 6–2, 6–4
Women's Singles 3rd round	(Russia) Maria Sharapova [7]	(Argentina) Paula Ormaechea	6–0, 6–0
Men's Singles 3rd round	(Canada) Milos Raonic [8]	(France) Gilles Simon [29]	4–6, 6–3, 2–6, 6–2, 7–5
Matches on Court Suzanne Lenglen (Grandstand)
Event	Winner	Loser	Score
Women's Singles 3rd round	(Australia) Samantha Stosur [19]	(Slovakia) Dominika Cibulková [9]	6–4, 6–4
Men's Singles 3rd round	(Serbia) Novak Djokovic [2]	(Croatia) Marin Čilić [25]	6–3, 6–2, 6–7^{(2–7)}, 6–4
Men's Singles 3rd round	(France) Jo-Wilfried Tsonga [13]	(Poland) Jerzy Janowicz [22]	6–4, 6–4, 6–3
Women's Singles 3rd round	(Germany) Angelique Kerber [8]	(Slovakia) Daniela Hantuchová [31]	7–5, 6–3
Matches on Court 1
Event	Winner	Loser	Score
Men's Singles 3rd round	(Latvia) Ernests Gulbis [18]	(Czech Republic) Radek Štěpánek	6–3, 6–2, 7–5
Women's Singles 3rd round	(Spain) Carla Suárez Navarro [14]	(United States) Taylor Townsend [WC]	6–2, 6–2
Men's Singles 3rd round	(United States) John Isner [10]	(Spain) Tommy Robredo [17]	7–6^{(15–13)}, 7–6^{(7–3)}, 6–7^{(5–7)}, 7–5
Women's Singles 3rd round	(France) Pauline Parmentier [WC]	(Germany) Mona Barthel	1–6, 6–1, 7–5

== Day 7 (31 May) ==
- Schedule of play
- Seeds out:
  - Men's Singles: (Italy) Fabio Fognini [14], (Italy) Andreas Seppi [32]
  - Women's Singles: (Czech Republic) Petra Kvitová [5], (Serbia) Ana Ivanovic [11], (Russia) Ekaterina Makarova [22], (Romania) Sorana Cîrstea [26]
  - Men's Doubles: (Netherlands) Jean-Julien Rojer / (Romania) Horia Tecău [13], (United Kingdom) Jamie Murray / (Australia) John Peers [15]
  - Women's Doubles: (Russia) Ekaterina Makarova / (Russia) Elena Vesnina [3], (United States) Raquel Kops-Jones / (United States) Abigail Spears [6]
  - Mixed Doubles: (United States) Abigail Spears / (Austria) Alexander Peya [1]

Matches on main courts
Matches on Court Philippe Chatrier (Center Court)
Event	Winner	Loser	Score
Women's Singles 3rd round	(Russia) Svetlana Kuznetsova [27]	(Czech Republic) Petra Kvitová [5]	6–7^{(3–7)}, 6–1, 9–7
Men's Singles 3rd round	(Spain) Rafael Nadal [1]	(Argentina) Leonardo Mayer	6–2, 7–5, 6–2
Women's Singles 3rd round	(Germany) Andrea Petkovic [28]	(France) Kristina Mladenovic	6–4, 4–6, 6–4
Men's Singles 3rd round	(France) Richard Gasquet [12] vs (Spain) Fernando Verdasco [24]		2–6, 3–6, 2–2, suspended
Matches on Court Suzanne Lenglen (Grandstand)
Event	Winner	Loser	Score
Women's Singles 3rd round	(United States) Sloane Stephens [15]	(Russia) Ekaterina Makarova [22]	6–3, 6–4
Women's Singles 3rd round	(Czech Republic) Lucie Šafářová [23]	(Serbia) Ana Ivanovic [11]	6–3, 6–3
Men's Singles 3rd round	(France) Gaël Monfils [23]	(Italy) Fabio Fognini [14]	5–7, 6–2, 6–4, 0–6, 6–2
Men's Singles 3rd round	(Germany) Philipp Kohlschreiber [28] vs (United Kingdom) Andy Murray [7]		6–3, 3–6, 3–6, 6–4, 7–7, suspended
Matches on Court 1
Event	Winner	Loser	Score
Men's Singles 3rd round	(Spain) David Ferrer [5]	(Italy) Andreas Seppi [32]	6–2, 7–6^{(7–2)}, 6–3
Women's Singles 3rd round	(Serbia) Jelena Janković [6]	(Romania) Sorana Cîrstea [26]	6–1, 6–2
Men's Singles 3rd round	(Spain) Guillermo García-López	(United States) Donald Young	6–2, 6–4, 2–6, 6–7^{(4–7)}, 6–4
Men's Doubles 3rd round	(United States) Bob Bryan [1] (United States) Mike Bryan [1]	(United Kingdom) Jamie Murray [15] (Australia) John Peers [15]	6–3, 6–1

== Day 8 (1 June) ==
- Schedule of play
- Seeds out:
  - Men's Singles: (Switzerland) Roger Federer [4], (United States) John Isner [10], (France) Richard Gasquet [12], (France) Jo-Wilfried Tsonga [13], (Germany) Philipp Kohlschreiber [28]
  - Women's Singles: (Germany) Angelique Kerber [8], (Australia) Samantha Stosur [19]
  - Men's Doubles: (France) Michaël Llodra / (France) Nicolas Mahut [5]
  - Women's Doubles: (United States) Liezel Huber / (United States) Lisa Raymond [15]
  - Mixed Doubles: (Slovenia) Katarina Srebotnik / (India) Rohan Bopanna [2], (Czech Republic) Lucie Hradecká / (Poland) Mariusz Fyrstenberg [6]

Matches on main courts
Matches on Court Philippe Chatrier (Center Court)
Event	Winner	Loser	Score
Women's Singles 4th round	(Canada) Eugenie Bouchard [18]	(Germany) Angelique Kerber [8]	6–1, 6–2
Men's Singles 3rd round	(Spain) Fernando Verdasco [24]	(France) Richard Gasquet [12]	6–2, 6–3, 6–3
Men's Singles 4th round	(Latvia) Ernests Gulbis [18]	(Switzerland) Roger Federer [4]	6–7^{(5–7)}, 7–6^{(7–3)}, 6–2, 4–6, 6–3
Men's Singles 4th round	(Serbia) Novak Djokovic [2]	(France) Jo-Wilfried Tsonga [13]	6–1, 6–4, 6–1
Women's Singles 4th round	(Spain) Garbiñe Muguruza	(France) Pauline Parmentier [WC]	6–4, 6–2
Matches on Court Suzanne Lenglen (Grandstand)
Event	Winner	Loser	Score
Men's Singles 4th round	(Czech Republic) Tomáš Berdych [6]	(United States) John Isner [10]	6–4, 6–4, 6–4
Men's Singles 3rd round	(United Kingdom) Andy Murray [7]	(Germany) Philipp Kohlschreiber [28]	3–6, 6–3, 6–3, 4–6, 12–10
Women's Singles 4th round	(Spain) Carla Suárez Navarro [14]	(Croatia) Ajla Tomljanović	6–3, 6–3
Men's Singles 4th round	(Canada) Milos Raonic [8]	(Spain) Marcel Granollers	6–3, 6–3, 6–3
Women's Singles 4th round	(Russia) Maria Sharapova [7]	(Australia) Samantha Stosur [19]	3–6, 6–4, 6–0
Matches on Court 1
Event	Winner	Loser	Score
Women's Doubles 3rd round	(Chinese Taipei) Hsieh Su-wei [1] (China) Peng Shuai [1]	(United States) Liezel Huber [15] (United States) Lisa Raymond [15]	6–0, 6–2
Women's Doubles 3rd round	(Czech Republic) Lucie Hradecká (Netherlands) Michaëlla Krajicek	(United States) Madison Keys (United States) Alison Riske	7–6^{(8–6)}, 3–6, 6–1
Men's Doubles 3rd round	(France) Julien Benneteau [11] (France) Édouard Roger-Vasselin [11]	(France) Michaël Llodra [5] (France) Nicolas Mahut [5]	2–1, retired
Mixed Doubles 2nd round	(Kazakhstan) Yaroslava Shvedova [3] (Brazil) Bruno Soares [3]	(France) Alizé Lim [WC] (France) Jérémy Chardy [WC]	6–3, 6–4

== Day 9 (2 June) ==
- Schedule of play
- Seeds out:
  - Men's Singles: (South Africa) Kevin Anderson [19], (Spain) Fernando Verdasco [24]
  - Women's Singles: (Serbia) Jelena Janković [6], (United States) Sloane Stephens [15], (Czech Republic) Lucie Šafářová [23]
  - Men's Doubles: (United States) Bob Bryan / (United States) Mike Bryan [1], (Canada) Daniel Nestor / (Serbia) Nenad Zimonjić [3]
  - Women's Doubles: (Italy) Flavia Pennetta / (France) Kristina Mladenovic [12]

Matches on main courts
Matches on Court Philippe Chatrier (Center Court)
Event	Winner	Loser	Score
Women's Singles 4th round	(Germany) Andrea Petkovic [28]	(Netherlands) Kiki Bertens [Q]	1–6, 6–2, 7–5
Men's Singles 4th round	(Spain) Rafael Nadal [1]	(Serbia) Dušan Lajović	6–1, 6–2, 6–1
Women's Singles 4th round	(Romania) Simona Halep [4]	(United States) Sloane Stephens [15]	6–4, 6–3
Men's Singles 4th round	(France) Gaël Monfils [23]	(Spain) Guillermo García-López	6–0, 6–2, 7–5
Matches on Court Suzanne Lenglen (Grandstand)
Event	Winner	Loser	Score
Men's Singles 4th round	(Spain) David Ferrer [5]	(South Africa) Kevin Anderson [19]	6–3, 6–3, 6–7^{(5–7)}, 6–1
Women's Singles 4th round	(Italy) Sara Errani [10]	(Serbia) Jelena Janković [6]	7–6^{(7–5)}, 6–2
Men's Singles 4th round	(United Kingdom) Andy Murray [7]	(Spain) Fernando Verdasco [24]	6–4, 7–5, 7–6^{(7–3)}
Matches on Court 1
Event	Winner	Loser	Score
Mixed Doubles Quarterfinals	(Hungary) Tímea Babos (United States) Eric Butorac	(France) Alizé Cornet [WC] (France) Jonathan Eysseric [WC]	6–4, 6–3
Women's Doubles 3rd round	(Australia) Ashleigh Barty [7] (Australia) Casey Dellacqua [7]	(France) Kristina Mladenovic [12] (Italy) Flavia Pennetta [12]	4–6, 6–2, 6–1
Women's Doubles 3rd round	(New Zealand) Marina Erakovic [16] (Spain) Arantxa Parra Santonja [16]	(France) Julie Coin [WC] (France) Pauline Parmentier [WC]	6–2, 6–3
Men's Doubles Quarterfinals	(Spain) Marcel Granollers [12] (Spain) Marc López [12]	(United States) Bob Bryan [1] (United States) Mike Bryan [1]	6–4, 6–2
Women's Singles 4th round	(Russia) Svetlana Kuznetsova [27]	(Czech Republic) Lucie Šafářová [23]	6–3, 6–4

== Day 10 (3 June) ==
- Schedule of play
- Seeds out:
  - Men's Singles: (Czech Republic) Tomáš Berdych [6], (Canada) Milos Raonic [8]
  - Women's Singles: (Spain) Carla Suárez Navarro [14]
  - Men's Doubles: (Poland) Łukasz Kubot / (Sweden) Robert Lindstedt [9]
  - Women's Doubles: (Zimbabwe) Cara Black / (India) Sania Mirza [5], (Australia) Ashleigh Barty / (Australia) Casey Dellacqua [7]
  - Mixed Doubles: (France) Kristina Mladenovic / (Canada) Daniel Nestor [5]

Matches on main courts
Matches on Court Philippe Chatrier (Center Court)
Event	Winner	Loser	Score
Women's Singles Quarterfinals	(Russia) Maria Sharapova [7]	(Spain) Garbiñe Muguruza	1–6, 7–5, 6–1
Men's Singles Quarterfinals	(Serbia) Novak Djokovic [2]	(Canada) Milos Raonic [8]	7–5, 7–6^{(7–5)}, 6–4
Matches on Court Suzanne Lenglen (Grandstand)
Event	Winner	Loser	Score
Women's Singles Quarterfinals	(Canada) Eugenie Bouchard [18]	(Spain) Carla Suárez Navarro [14]	7–6^{(7–4)}, 2–6, 7–5
Men's Singles Quarterfinals	(Latvia) Ernests Gulbis [18]	(Czech Republic) Tomáš Berdych [6]	6–3, 6–2, 6–4
Matches on Court 1
Event	Winner	Loser	Score
Men's Doubles Quarterfinals	(Kazakhstan) Andrey Golubev (Australia) Samuel Groth	(Poland) Łukasz Kubot [9] (Sweden) Robert Lindstedt [9]	6–3, 6–3
Women's Doubles Quarterfinals	(Chinese Taipei) Hsieh Su-wei [1] (China) Peng Shuai [1]	(Zimbabwe) Cara Black [5] (India) Sania Mirza [5]	6–2, 3–6, 6–3
Women's Doubles Quarterfinals	(Italy) Sara Errani [2] (Italy) Roberta Vinci [2]	(Australia) Ashleigh Barty [7] (Australia) Casey Dellacqua [7]	6–0, 6–1
Men's Doubles Quarterfinals	(France) Julien Benneteau [11] (France) Édouard Roger-Vasselin [11]	(Argentina) Máximo González (Argentina) Juan Mónaco	7–5, 4–6, 7–6^{(7–5)}

== Day 11 (4 June) ==
- Schedule of play
- Seeds out:
  - Men's Singles: (Spain) David Ferrer [5], (France) Gaël Monfils [23]
  - Women's Singles: (Italy) Sara Errani [10], (Russia) Svetlana Kuznetsova [27]
  - Women's Doubles: (Czech Republic) Květa Peschke / (Slovenia) Katarina Srebotnik [4], (New Zealand) Marina Erakovic / (Spain) Arantxa Parra Santonja [16]
  - Mixed Doubles: (Kazakhstan) Yaroslava Shvedova / (Brazil) Bruno Soares [3]

Matches on main courts
Matches on Court Philippe Chatrier (Center Court)
Event	Winner	Loser	Score
Women's Singles Quarterfinals	(Germany) Andrea Petkovic [28]	(Italy) Sara Errani [10]	6–2, 6–2
Men's Singles Quarterfinals	(United Kingdom) Andy Murray [7]	(France) Gaël Monfils [23]	6–1, 6–4, 4–6, 1–6, 6–0
Matches on Court Suzanne Lenglen (Grandstand)
Event	Winner	Loser	Score
Women's Singles Quarterfinals	(Romania) Simona Halep [4]	(Russia) Svetlana Kuznetsova [27]	6–2, 6–2
Men's Singles Quarterfinals	(Spain) Rafael Nadal [1]	(Spain) David Ferrer [5]	4–6, 6–4, 6–0, 6–1
Matches on Court 1
Event	Winner	Loser	Score
Legends Over 45 Doubles Round Robin	(United States) John McEnroe (United States) Patrick McEnroe	(France) Guy Forget (France) Henri Leconte	7–6^{(7–3)}, 6–3
Mixed Doubles Semifinals	(Germany) Anna-Lena Grönefeld (Netherlands) Jean-Julien Rojer	(Kazakhstan) Yaroslava Shvedova [3] (Brazil) Bruno Soares [3]	3–6, 7–6^{(7–4)}, [10–5]
Women's Doubles Quarterfinals	(Spain) Garbiñe Muguruza (Spain) Carla Suárez Navarro	(Czech Republic) Květa Peschke [4] (Slovenia) Katarina Srebotnik [4]	6–4, 6–4

== Day 12 (5 June) ==
- Schedule of play
- Seeds out:
  - Women's Singles: (Canada) Eugenie Bouchard [18], (Germany) Andrea Petkovic [28]
  - Mixed Doubles: (Germany) Julia Görges / (Serbia) Nenad Zimonjić [8]

Matches on main courts
Matches on Court Philippe Chatrier (Center Court)
Event	Winner	Loser	Score
Mixed Doubles Final	(Germany) Anna-Lena Grönefeld (Netherlands) Jean-Julien Rojer	(Germany) Julia Görges [8] (Serbia) Nenad Zimonjić [8]	4–6, 6–2, [10–7]
Women's Singles Semifinals	(Russia) Maria Sharapova [7]	(Canada) Eugenie Bouchard [18]	4–6, 7–5, 6–2
Women's Singles Semifinals	(Romania) Simona Halep [4]	(Germany) Andrea Petkovic [28]	6–2, 7–6^{(7–4)}
Matches on Court Suzanne Lenglen (Grandstand)
Event	Winner	Loser	Score
Women's Legends Doubles Round Robin	(Belgium) Kim Clijsters (United States) Martina Navratilova	(Croatia) Iva Majoli (Russia) Anastasia Myskina	6–2, 4–6, [10–8]
Legends Over 45 Doubles Round Robin	(Sweden) Mikael Pernfors (Sweden) Mats Wilander	(France) Mansour Bahrami (France) Cédric Pioline	6–2, 6–4
Men's Doubles Semifinals	(Spain) Marcel Granollers [12] (Spain) Marc López [12]	(Croatia) Marin Draganja (Romania) Florin Mergea	6–3, 1–6, 6–3
Men's Doubles Semifinals	(France) Julien Benneteau [11] (France) Édouard Roger-Vasselin [11]	(Kazakhstan) Andrey Golubev (Australia) Samuel Groth	3–6, 6–3, 6–4
Matches on Court 1
Event	Winner	Loser	Score
Legends Under 45 Doubles Round Robin	(France) Arnaud Clément (France) Nicolas Escudé	(Sweden) Thomas Enqvist (Argentina) Gastón Gaudio	6–4, 6–4
Women's Legends Round Robin	(United States) Lindsay Davenport (United States) Mary Joe Fernández	(Czech Republic) Jana Novotná (Belarus) Natasha Zvereva	6–3, 6–2
Legends Under 45 Doubles Round Robin	(Spain) Albert Costa (Spain) Carlos Moyá	(Sweden) Thomas Enqvist (Argentina) Gastón Gaudio	6–4, 7–6^{(8–6)}

== Day 13 (6 June) ==
- Schedule of play
- Seeds out:
  - Men's Singles: (United Kingdom) Andy Murray [7], (Latvia) Ernests Gulbis [18]

Matches on main courts
Matches on Court Philippe Chatrier (Center Court)
Event	Winner	Loser	Score
Men's Singles Semifinals	(Serbia) Novak Djokovic [2]	(Latvia) Ernests Gulbis [18]	6–3, 6–3, 3–6, 6–3
Men's Singles Semifinals	(Spain) Rafael Nadal [1]	(United Kingdom) Andy Murray [7]	6–3, 6–2, 6–1
Matches on Court Suzanne Lenglen (Grandstand)
Event	Winner	Loser	Score
Legends Over 45 Doubles Round Robin	(Australia) Pat Cash (Netherlands) Paul Haarhuis	(France) Guy Forget (France) Henri Leconte	6–3, 7–6^{(7–3)}
Women's Doubles Semifinals	(Chinese Taipei) Hsieh Su-wei [1] (China) Peng Shuai [1]	(Spain) Garbiñe Muguruza (Spain) Carla Suárez Navarro	6–2, 5–7, 6–2
Women's Doubles Semifinals	(Italy) Sara Errani [2] (Italy) Roberta Vinci [2]	(Czech Republic) Lucie Hradecká (Netherlands) Michaëlla Krajicek	6–2, 6–1
Matches on Court 1
Event	Winner	Loser	Score
Legends Under 45 Doubles Round Robin	(France) Sébastien Grosjean (France) Fabrice Santoro	(Spain) Sergi Bruguera (Ukraine) Andriy Medvedev	3–6, 6–2, [10–7]
Women's Legends Doubles Round Robin	(France) Nathalie Dechy (France) Sandrine Testud	(Czech Republic) Jana Novotná (Belarus) Natasha Zvereva	6–3, 6–4

== Day 14 (7 June) ==
- Schedule of play
- Seeds out:
  - Women's Singles: (Romania) Simona Halep [4]
  - Men's Doubles: (Spain) Marcel Granollers / (Spain) Marc López [12]

Matches on main courts
Matches on Court Philippe Chatrier (Center Court)
Event	Winner	Loser	Score
Women's Singles Final	(Russia) Maria Sharapova [7]	(Romania) Simona Halep [4]	6–4, 6–7^{(5–7)}, 6–4
Men's Doubles Final	(France) Julien Benneteau [11] (France) Édouard Roger-Vasselin [11]	(Spain) Marcel Granollers [12] (Spain) Marc López [12]	6–3, 7–6^{(7–1)}
Matches on Court Suzanne Lenglen (Grandstand)
Event	Winner	Loser	Score
Women's Legends Doubles Final	(Belgium) Kim Clijsters (United States) Martina Navratilova	(France) Nathalie Dechy (France) Sandrine Testud	5–7, 7–5, [10–7]
Legends Over 45 Doubles Round Robin	(United States) John McEnroe (United States) Patrick McEnroe	(Australia) Pat Cash (Netherlands) Paul Haarhuis	6–4, 6–2
Matches on Court 1
Event	Winner	Loser	Score
Legends Under 45 Doubles Round Robin	(Croatia) Goran Ivanišević (Australia) Todd Woodbridge	(Spain) Sergi Bruguera (Ukraine) Andriy Medvedev	6–4, 6–4
Legends Over 45 Doubles Round Robin	(Ecuador) Andrés Gómez (Australia) Mark Woodforde	(Sweden) Mikael Pernfors (Sweden) Mats Wilander	6–2, 7–5

== Day 15 (8 June) ==
- Schedule of play
- Seeds out:
  - Men's Singles: (Serbia) Novak Djokovic [2]
  - Women's Doubles: (Italy) Sara Errani / (Italy) Roberta Vinci [2]

Matches on main courts
Matches on Court Philippe Chatrier (Center Court)
Event	Winner	Loser	Score
Women's Doubles Final	(Chinese Taipei) Hsieh Su-wei [1] (China) Peng Shuai [1]	(Italy) Sara Errani [2] (Italy) Roberta Vinci [2]	6–4, 6–1
Men's Singles Final	(Spain) Rafael Nadal [1]	(Serbia) Novak Djokovic [2]	3–6, 7–5, 6–2, 6–4
Matches on Court Suzanne Lenglen (Grandstand)
Event	Winner	Loser	Score
Men's Legends Under 45 Final	(Iran) Mansour Bahrami (France) Fabrice Santoro	(France) Arnaud Clément (France) Nicolas Escudé	6–2, 2–6, [11–9]
Men's Legends Over 45 Final	(United States) John McEnroe (United States) Patrick McEnroe	(Ecuador) Andrés Gómez (Australia) Mark Woodforde	4–6, 7–5, [10–7]
