= Ioana Ducu =

Romanian tennis player

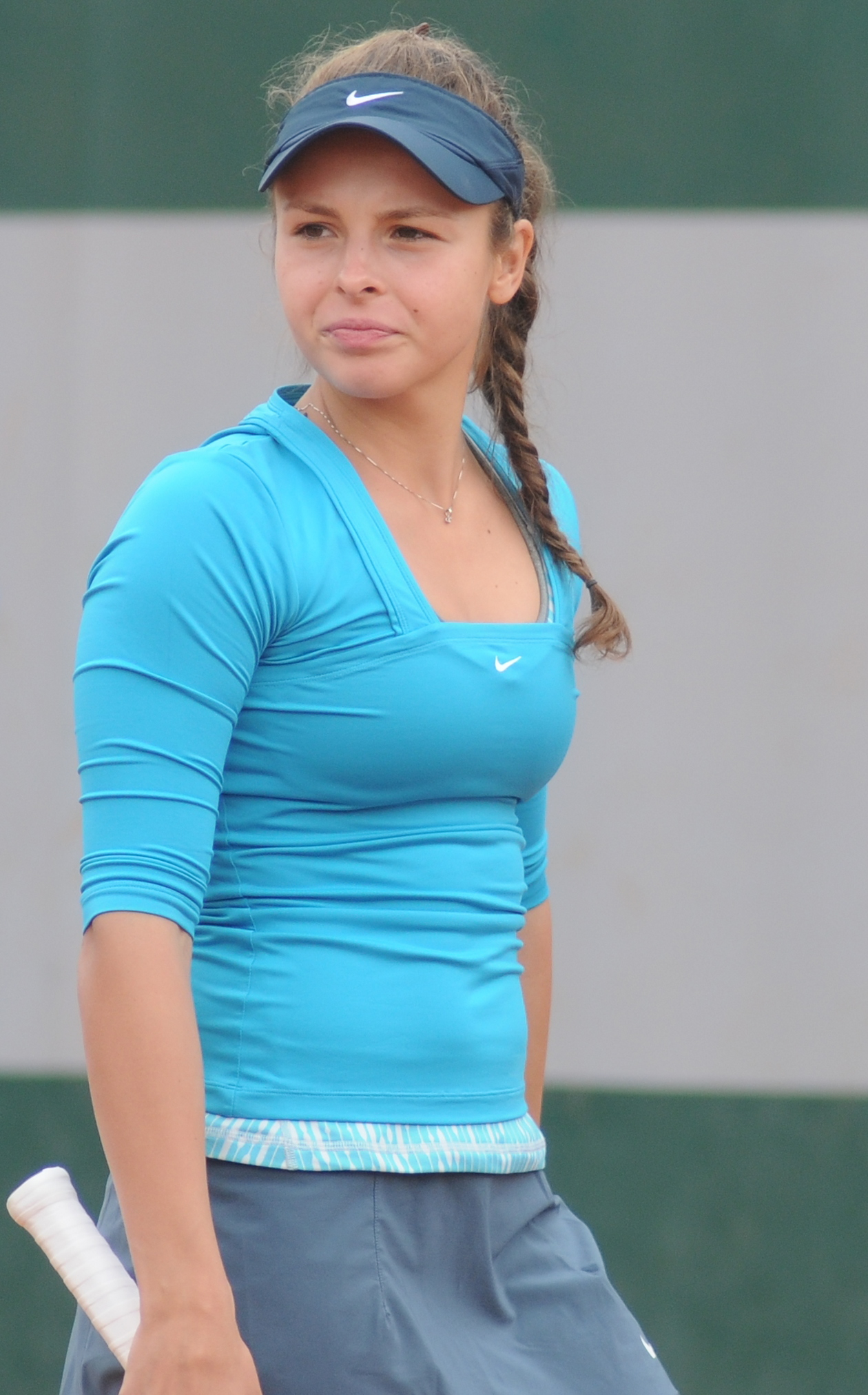
- Ducu at the 2014 French Open
- Country (sports): Romania
- Born: 8 April 1996 (age 30) Bucharest
- Retired: 2016
- Prize money: $6,695

Singles
- Career record: 19–23
- Career titles: 0
- Highest ranking: No. 830 (9 September 2013)

Grand Slam singles results
- French Open Junior: 1R (2013, 2014)
- Wimbledon Junior: 2R (2013)
- US Open Junior: 2R (2013)

Doubles
- Career record: 17–13
- Career titles: 1 ITF
- Highest ranking: No. 736 (3 November 2014)

Grand Slam doubles results
- French Open Junior: W (2014)
- Wimbledon Junior: SF (2013)
- US Open Junior: 1R (2013)

Ioana Ducu (born 8 April 1996) is a former Romanian tennis player. In her career, she won one doubles title on the ITF Women's Circuit and reached best WTA rankings of 830 in singles and 736 in doubles.

In June 2014, together with fellow Romanian Ioana Loredana Roșca, Ducu won the girls' doubles tournament at the French Open, defeating CiCi Bellis and Markéta Vondroušová in the final, in three sets.

In 2017, it was announced that she ended her tennis career for pursuit of a career in medicine. She played her last match on the ITF Circuit in September 2014 in Sharm El Sheikh, Egypt.

== ITF Circuit finals ==
=== Singles (0–1) ===
Legend $10,000 tournaments	Finals by surface Clay (0–1)

Result	Date	Tournament	Surface	Opponent	Score
Loss	Feb 2013	ITF Antalya, Turkey	Clay	(Serbia) Jovana Jakšić	2–6, 5–7

=== Doubles (1–3) ===
Legend $25,000 tournaments $10,000 tournaments	Finals by surface Hard (1–1) Clay (0–2)

Result	No.	Date	Tournament	Surface	Partner	Opponents	Score
Loss	1.	18 February 2013	ITF Antalya, Turkey	Clay	(Romania) Cristina Ene	(Hungary) Ágnes Bukta (Slovakia) Vivien Juhászová	1–6, 6–2, [6–10]
Loss	2.	12 September 2014	ITF Bucharest, Romania	Clay	(Moldova) Julia Helbet	(Romania) Raluca Ciufrila (Romania) Andreea Ghițescu	7–6^{(2)}, 1–6, [7–10]
Win	1.	22 September 2014	ITF Sharm El Sheikh, Egypt	Hard	(United Kingdom) Eden Silva	(Japan) Yui Saikai (Japan) Natsumi Yokota	6–2, 6–4
Loss	3.	29 September 2014	ITF Sharm El Sheikh, Egypt	Hard	(United Kingdom) Eden Silva	(United Kingdom) Harriet Dart (Turkey) Melis Sezer	5–7, 1–6

== Junior Grand Slam finals ==
=== Girls' doubles ===
Result	Year	Championship	Surface	Partner	Opponents	Score
Win	2014	French Open	Clay	(Romania) Ioana Loredana Roșca	(United States) CiCi Bellis (Czech Republic) Markéta Vondroušová	6–1, 5–7, [11–9]
