= 2014 French Open – Boys' singles =

Boys' singles
- 2014 French Open

Final
- Champion: (Russia) Andrey Rublev
- Runner-up: (Spain) Jaume Antoni Munar Clar
- Score: 6–2, 7–5

Events
Singles	men	women		boys	girls
Doubles	men	women	mixed	boys	girls
WC Singles	men	women	quad
WC Doubles	men	women	quad
Legends	−45	45+	women
- French Open

Cristian Garín was the defending champion, having won the event in 2013, but decided to compete in the men's singles qualifying and lost to Daniel Muñoz de la Nava in the first round.

Andrey Rublev won the title, defeating Jaume Antoni Munar Clar in the final, 6–2, 7–5.

== Seeds ==
1. (United States) Frances Tiafoe (second round)
2. (Brazil) Orlando Luz (semifinals)
3. (Russia) Karen Khachanov (third round)
4. (Russia) Andrey Rublev (champion)
5. (France) Quentin Halys (semifinals)
6. (United States) Stefan Kozlov (quarterfinals)
7. (Spain) Jaume Antoni Munar Clar (final)
8. (Japan) Naoki Nakagawa (third round)
9. (France) Johan-Sébastien Tatlot (quarterfinals)
10. (South Korea) Lee Duck-hee (third round)
11. (United States) Michael Mmoh (third round)
12. (Poland) Kamil Majchrzak (second round)
13. (Japan) Jumpei Yamasaki (second round)
14. (Brazil) Marcelo Zormann da Silva (quarterfinals)
15. (Croatia) Nino Serdarušić (second round)
16. (Russia) Daniil Medvedev (third round)

== Main draw ==
Key

- Q = Qualifier
- WC = Wild card
- LL = Lucky loser
- Alt = Alternate
- ITF = ITF entry
- PR = Protected ranking
- SR = Special ranking
- SE = Special exempt
- JE = Junior exempt
- JR = Junior Accelerator Programme entrant
- CO = College Accelerator Programme entrant
- NG = Next Gen Accelerator Program entrant
- w/o = Walkover
- r = Retired
- d = Defaulted

=== Finals ===
Quarterfinals
(South Korea) Hong Seong-chan	5	4
5	(France) Quentin Halys	7	6
14	(Brazil) Marcelo Zormann	1	2
7	(Spain) Jaume Antoni Munar Clar	6	6
6	(United States) Stefan Kozlov	5	6	4
4	(Russia) Andrey Rublev	7	3	6
9	(France) Johan-Sébastien Tatlot	5	7	4
2	(Brazil) Orlando Luz	7	5	6

Semifinals
5	(France) Quentin Halys	4	2
7	(Spain) Jaume Antoni Munar Clar	6	6
4	(Russia) Andrey Rublev	7	6
2	(Brazil) Orlando Luz	5	3

Final
7	(Spain) Jaume Antoni Munar Clar	2	5
4	(Russia) Andrey Rublev	6	7

=== Top half ===
==== Section 1 ====
First round
1	(United States) Frances Tiafoe	6	7
WC	(France) Clément Larrière	4	5
(Germany) Jan Choinski	6	6
(Peru) Juan José Rosas	1	2
(Italy) Filippo Baldi	6^{4}	6	3
(South Korea) Hong Seong-chan	7^{7}	2	6
(Russia) Bogdan Bobrov	3	4
13	(Japan) Jumpei Yamasaki	6	6
12	(Poland) Kamil Majchrzak	2	7^{7}	6
Q	(Brazil) Rafael Matos	6	6^{5}	2
(Australia) Harry Bourchier	3	4
(Austria) Lucas Miedler	6	6
Q	(Chile) Bastián Malla	5	3
Q	(United States) Noah Rubin	7	6
(Romania) Nicolae Frunză	1	6^{3}
5	(France) Quentin Halys	6	7^{7}

Second round
1	(United States) F Tiafoe	6	2	3
(Germany) J Choinski	3	6	6
(South Korea) S-c Hong	6	2	6
13	(Japan) J Yamasaki	2	6	0
12	(Poland) K Majchrzak	2	1
(Austria) L Miedler	6	6
Q	(United States) N Rubin	3	3
5	(France) Q Halys	6	6

Third round
(Germany) J Choinski	4	1
(South Korea) S-c Hong	6	6
(Austria) L Miedler	6	5	1
5	(France) Q Halys	1	7	6

Quarterfinals
(South Korea) S-c Hong	5	4
5	(France) Q Halys	7	6

==== Section 2 ====
First round
3	(Russia) Karen Khachanov	6	6
Q	(Dominican Republic) Peter Bertran	2	2
(South Korea) Oh Chan-yeong	4	4
(United States) Alex Rybakov	6	6
WC	(France) Mandresy Rakotomalala	6	1	6
(Argentina) Matías Zukas	3	6	3
LL	(Uzbekistan) Jurabek Karimov	1	2
14	(Brazil) Marcelo Zormann	6	6
11	(United States) Michael Mmoh	7^{7}	6
(China) Zheng Weiqiang	6^{5}	1
WC	(France) Thomas Bréchemier	3	6	2
(Australia) Omar Jasika	6	4	6
(Japan) Ken Onishi	6	3	3
(Slovakia) Martin Blaško	4	6	6
(Serbia) Petar Čonkić	2	4
7	(Spain) Jaume Antoni Munar Clar	6	6

Second round
3	(Russia) K Khachanov	6	6
(United States) A Rybakov	4	3
WC	(France) M Rakotomalala	2	2
14	(Brazil) M Zormann	6	6
11	(United States) M Mmoh	5	6	6
(Australia) O Jasika	7	4	3
(Slovakia) M Blaško	3	5
7	(Spain) JA Munar Clar	6	7

Third round
3	(Russia) K Khachanov	7^{7}	4	7
14	(Brazil) M Zormann	6^{3}	6	9
11	(United States) M Mmoh	2	1
7	(Spain) JA Munar Clar	6	6

Quarterfinals
14	(Brazil) M Zormann	1	2
7	(Spain) JA Munar Clar	6	6

=== Bottom half ===
==== Section 3 ====
First round
6	(United States) Stefan Kozlov	6	6
(Japan) Ryotaro Matsumura	4	4
WC	(France) Maxime Janvier	6	3	4
Q	(Australia) Akira Santillan	2	6	6
Q	(Germany) Viktor Kostin	6^{3}	6	6
(Poland) Hubert Hurkacz	7^{7}	3	8
WC	(France) Corentin Moutet	1	3
10	(South Korea) Lee Duck-hee	6	6
15	(Croatia) Nino Serdarušić	4	6	7
(Peru) Nicolás Álvarez	6	3	5
WC	(France) Théo Fournerie	6	2	4
(Cyprus) Petros Chrysochos	4	6	6
(United States) Henrik Wiersholm	3	6	6
(Brazil) João Menezes	6	2	4
(Romania) Bogdan Ionuț Apostol	7	1	5
4	(Russia) Andrey Rublev	5	6	7

Second round
6	(United States) S Kozlov	6	6
Q	(Australia) A Santillan	3	3
(Poland) H Hurkacz	4	6	9
10	(South Korea) D-h Lee	6	2	11
15	(Croatia) N Serdarušić	4	2
(Cyprus) P Chrysochos	6	6
(United States) H Wiersholm	3	6	3
4	(Russia) A Rublev	6	3	6

Third round
6	(United States) S Kozlov	7^{7}	6
10	(South Korea) D-h Lee	6^{4}	1
(Cyprus) P Chrysochos	1	2
4	(Russia) A Rublev	6	6

Quarterfinals
6	(United States) S Kozlov	5	6	4
4	(Russia) A Rublev	7	3	6

==== Section 4 ====
First round
8	(Japan) Naoki Nakagawa	6	6
(Russia) Boris Pokotilov	2	2
Q	(South Korea) Chung Yun-seong	6	6
(China) Qi Xi	2	4
(Argentina) Francisco Bahamonde	7^{7}	6
Q	(Italy) Matteo Berrettini	6^{4}	2
(Australia) Marc Polmans	2	7^{8}	4
9	(France) Johan-Sébastien Tatlot	6	6^{6}	6
16	(Russia) Daniil Medvedev	7	7^{9}
(Spain) Pedro Martínez	5	6^{7}
(Poland) Jan Zieliński	1	7	6
WC	(France) Alexandre Müller	6	5	4
(South Korea) Kang Ku-keon	4	2
(United States) Taylor Harry Fritz	6	6
(Slovakia) Alex Molčan	1	1
2	(Brazil) Orlando Luz	6	6

Second round
8	(Japan) N Nakagawa	7^{7}	6
Q	(South Korea) Y-s Chung	6^{3}	0
(Argentina) F Bahamonde	4	4
9	(France) J-S Tatlot	6	6
16	(Russia) D Medvedev	6	6
(Poland) J Zieliński	3	4
(United States) TH Fritz	4	0
2	(Brazil) O Luz	6	6

Third round
8	(Japan) N Nakagawa	2	2
9	(France) J-S Tatlot	6	6
16	(Russia) D Medvedev	1	3
2	(Brazil) O Luz	6	6

Quarterfinals
9	(France) J-S Tatlot	5	7	4
2	(Brazil) O Luz	7	5	6
