= 2014 French Open – Girls' singles =

Girls' singles
- 2014 French Open

Final
- Champion: (Russia) Darya Kasatkina
- Runner-up: (Serbia) Ivana Jorović
- Score: 6–7^{(5–7)}, 6–2, 6–3

Events
Singles	men	women		boys	girls
Doubles	men	women	mixed	boys	girls
WC Singles	men	women	quad
WC Doubles	men	women	quad
Legends	−45	45+	women
← 2013 ·	French Open	· 2015 →

Darya Kasatkina won the title, defeating Ivana Jorović in the final, 6–7^{(5–7)}, 6–2, 6–3.

Belinda Bencic was the defending champion, but chose to compete in the women's singles competition. She lost to 29th seed Venus Williams in the first round.

== Seeds ==
1. (Serbia) Ivana Jorović (final)
2. (United States) CiCi Bellis (third round)
3. (United States) Tornado Alicia Black (first round)
4. (Spain) Aliona Bolsova Zadoinov (third round)
5. (Switzerland) Jil Belen Teichmann (second round)
6. (Russia) Varvara Flink (first round)
7. (China) Sun Ziyue (first round)
8. (Russia) Darya Kasatkina (champion)
9. (Ukraine) Anhelina Kalinina (first round)
10. (Canada) Françoise Abanda (semifinals)
11. (Slovakia) Kristína Schmiedlová (quarterfinals)
12. (Australia) Priscilla Hon (first round)
13. (Ukraine) Olga Fridman (first round)
14. (Hungary) Anna Bondár (first round)
15. (Egypt) Sandra Samir (first round)
16. (Belarus) Iryna Shymanovich (quarterfinals)

== Main draw ==
=== Key ===
- Q = Qualifier
- WC = Wild card
- LL = Lucky loser
- Alt = Alternate
- SE = Special exempt
- PR = Protected ranking
- ITF = ITF entry
- JE = Junior exempt
- w/o = Walkover
- r = Retired
- d = Defaulted
- SR = Special ranking

=== Finals ===
Quarterfinals
1	(Serbia) Ivana Jorović	6	6
11	(Slovakia) Kristína Schmiedlová	2	2
(Spain) Paula Badosa	7	5	3
10	(Canada) Françoise Abanda	5	7	6
8	(Russia) Darya Kasatkina	6^{4}	6	6
16	(Belarus) Iryna Shymanovich	7^{7}	0	4
Q	(Slovakia) Rebecca Šramková	3	6	3
(Czech Republic) Markéta Vondroušová	6	4	6

Semifinals
1	(Serbia) Ivana Jorović	6	6
10	(Canada) Françoise Abanda	4	0
8	(Russia) Darya Kasatkina	6	4	6
(Czech Republic) Markéta Vondroušová	2	6	4

Final
1	(Serbia) Ivana Jorović	7^{7}	2	3
8	(Russia) Darya Kasatkina	6^{5}	6	6

=== Top half ===
==== Section 1 ====
First round
1	(Serbia) Ivana Jorović	6	6
(Romania) Jaqueline Adina Cristian	2	2
(United States) Usue Maitane Arconada	6	6
(Italy) Bianca Turati	0	0
(Russia) Anna Kalinskaya	2	0
SE	(Lithuania) Akvilė Paražinskaitė	6	6
(France) Fiona Ferro	6	6
13	(Ukraine) Olga Fridman	2	3
11	(Slovakia) Kristína Schmiedlová	6	6
(United States) Katrine Steffensen	1	2
(Brazil) Luisa Stefani	6	6
(Belgium) Greet Minnen	4	3
Q	(Russia) Natalia Vikhlyantseva	6	6
WC	(France) Tessah Andrianjafitrimo	4	1
(Czech Republic) Simona Heinová	7^{7}	6
7	(China) Sun Ziyue	6^{3}	4

Second round
1	(Serbia) I Jorović	7^{7}	6
(United States) UM Arconada	6^{4}	2
SE	(Lithuania) A Paražinskaitė	1	3
(France) F Ferro	6	6
11	(Slovakia) K Schmiedlová	1	7^{11}	8
(Brazil) L Stefani	6	6^{9}	6
Q	(Russia) N Vikhlyantseva	2	6	6
(Czech Republic) S Heinová	6	4	4

Third round
1	(Serbia) I Jorović	6	6
(France) F Ferro	4	2
11	(Slovakia) K Schmiedlová	7^{7}	6
Q	(Russia) N Vikhlyantseva	6^{4}	4

Quarterfinals
1	(Serbia) I Jorović	6	6
11	(Slovakia) K Schmiedlová	2	2

==== Section 2 ====
First round
3	(United States) Tornado Alicia Black	2	1
(Spain) Paula Badosa	6	6
Q	(Australia) Naiktha Bains	6^{3}	4
(Colombia) María Fernanda Herazo	7^{7}	6
WC	(France) Estelle Cascino	1	3
Q	(Romania) Elena Gabriela Ruse	6	6
(Hungary) Fanny Stollár	6	6
15	(Egypt) Sandra Samir	2	3
10	(Canada) Françoise Abanda	7^{7}	6
(Latvia) Jeļena Ostapenko	6^{5}	4
WC	(France) Victoria Muntean	6	7
(Ecuador) Doménica González	4	5
(United States) Sofia Kenin	3	3
Q	(Slovakia) Tereza Mihalíková	6	6
SE	(United Kingdom) Isabelle Wallace	7	6
6	(Russia) Varvara Flink	5	2

Second round
(Spain) P Badosa	6	6
(Colombia) MF Herazo	2	4
Q	(Romania) EG Ruse	6	6
(Hungary) F Stollár	3	2
10	(Canada) F Abanda	6	6
WC	(France) V Muntean	2	0
Q	(Slovakia) T Mihalíková	6	3	4
SE	(United Kingdom) I Wallace	0	6	6

Third round
(Spain) P Badosa	6	6
Q	(Romania) EG Ruse	4	3
10	(Canada) F Abanda	7	7^{10}
SE	(United Kingdom) I Wallace	5	6^{8}

Quarterfinals
(Spain) P Badosa	7	5	3
10	(Canada) F Abanda	5	7	6

=== Bottom half ===
==== Section 3 ====
First round
8	(Russia) Darya Kasatkina	6	6
(Thailand) Kamonwan Buayam	2	0
WC	(China) Zheng Wushuang	6	4	6
WC	(France) Océane Dodin	4	6	4
(United Kingdom) Katie Boulter	6	3	6
Q	(United States) Raveena Kingsley	1	6	3
(Romania) Ioana Loredana Roșca	6	6^{6}	6
12	(Australia) Priscilla Hon	4	7^{8}	3
16	(Belarus) Iryna Shymanovich	3	6	6
Q	(Slovakia) Viktória Kužmová	6	4	2
WC	(France) Lucie Wargnier	4	6	7
(Brazil) Leticia Garcia Vidal	6	3	5
(Ukraine) Helen Ploskina	6^{4}	4
Q	(Austria) Julia Grabher	7^{7}	6
(Russia) Anastasiya Komardina	2	2
4	(Spain) Aliona Bolsova Zadoinov	6	6

Second round
8	(Russia) D Kasatkina	6	6
WC	(China) W Zheng	4	2
(United Kingdom) K Boulter	0	3
(Romania) IL Roșca	6	6
16	(Belarus) I Shymanovich	6	6
WC	(France) L Wargnier	4	3
Q	(Austria) J Grabher	5	3
4	(Spain) A Bolsova Zadoinov	7	6

Third round
8	(Russia) D Kasatkina	6	7^{8}
(Romania) IL Roșca	2	6^{6}
16	(Belarus) I Shymanovich	4	6	6
4	(Spain) A Bolsova Zadoinov	6	3	1

Quarterfinals
8	(Russia) D Kasatkina	6^{4}	6	6
16	(Belarus) I Shymanovich	7^{7}	0	4

==== Section 4 ====
First round
5	(Switzerland) Jil Belen Teichmann	7	6
(Mexico) Renata Zarazúa	5	4
Q	(Slovakia) Rebecca Šramková	6	6
(United States) Dasha Ivanova	2	4
(China) You Xiaodi	6^{6}	6	3
(Serbia) Katarina Jokić	7^{8}	4	6
WC	(France) Margot Yerolymos	6	7
9	(Ukraine) Anhelina Kalinina	3	5
14	(Hungary) Anna Bondár	2	0
(Czech Republic) Markéta Vondroušová	6	6
(Romania) Ioana Ducu	6	3	1
(Croatia) Jana Fett	2	6	6
WC	(France) Emmanuelle Salas	6	6^{4}	6
(Russia) Evgeniya Levashova	1	7^{7}	2
(Australia) Kimberly Birrell	3	3
2	(United States) CiCi Bellis	6	6

Second round
5	(Switzerland) JB Teichmann	3	1
Q	(Slovakia) R Šramková	6	6
(Serbia) K Jokić	6	5	4
WC	(France) M Yerolymos	2	7	6
(Czech Republic) M Vondroušová	6	6
(Croatia) J Fett	3	2
WC	(France) E Salas	1	3
2	(United States) C Bellis	6	6

Third round
Q	(Slovakia) R Šramková	6	6
WC	(France) M Yerolymos	1	4
(Czech Republic) M Vondroušová	6	6
2	(United States) C Bellis	0	4

Quarterfinals
Q	(Slovakia) R Šramková	3	6	3
(Czech Republic) M Vondroušová	6	4	6
