= 2014 French Open – Girls' doubles =

Girls' doubles
- 2014 French Open

Final
- Champions: (Romania) Ioana Ducu (Romania) Ioana Loredana Roșca
- Runners-up: (United States) CiCi Bellis (Czech Republic) Markéta Vondroušová
- Score: 6–1, 5–7, [11–9]

Events
Singles	men	women		boys	girls
Doubles	men	women	mixed	boys	girls
WC Singles	men	women	quad
WC Doubles	men	women	quad
Legends	−45	45+	women
← 2013 ·	French Open	· 2015 →

Barbora Krejčíková and Kateřina Siniaková were the defending champions, having won the event in 2013, but neither player decided to participate this year.

Ioana Ducu and Ioana Loredana Roșca won the title, defeating CiCi Bellis and Markéta Vondroušová in the final, 6–1, 5–7, [11–9].

== Seeds ==
1. (Canada) Françoise Abanda / (Russia) Varvara Flink (first round; withdrew)
2. (Australia) Priscilla Hon / (Switzerland) Jil Belen Teichmann (second round)
3. (United Kingdom) Katie Boulter / (Serbia) Ivana Jorović (first round)
4. (Australia) Naiktha Bains / (United States) Tornado Alicia Black (semifinals)
5. (China) Sun Ziyue / (China) You Xiaodi (second round)
6. (Hungary) Anna Bondár / (Hungary) Fanny Stollár (second round)
7. (United States) CiCi Bellis / (Czech Republic) Markéta Vondroušová (final)
8. (Ukraine) Anhelina Kalinina / (Latvia) Jeļena Ostapenko (first round)

== Draw ==
=== Key ===
- Q = Qualifier
- WC = Wild card
- LL = Lucky loser
- Alt = Alternate
- SE = Special exempt
- PR = Protected ranking
- ITF = ITF entry
- JE = Junior exempt
- w/o = Walkover
- r = Retired
- d = Defaulted
- SR = Special ranking

=== Finals ===
Semifinals
(Brazil) Luisa Stefani (Mexico) Renata Zarazúa	4	3
7	(United States) CiCi Bellis (Czech Republic) Markéta Vondroušová	6	6
4	(Australia) Naiktha Bains (United States) Tornado Alicia Black	3	3
(Romania) Ioana Ducu (Romania) Ioana Loredana Roșca	6	6

Final
7	(United States) CiCi Bellis (Czech Republic) Markéta Vondroušová	1	7	[9]
(Romania) Ioana Ducu (Romania) Ioana Loredana Roșca	6	5	[11]

=== Top half ===
First round
1	(Canada) Françoise Abanda (Russia) Varvara Flink
(Brazil) Luisa Stefani (Mexico) Renata Zarazúa	w/o
(Indonesia) Tami Grende (United States) Raveena Kingsley	6	4	[7]
(United States) Dasha Ivanova (United States) Katrine Steffensen	2	6	[10]
(Italy) Bianca Turati (China) Zheng Wushuang	2	7	[10]
(Australia) Kimberly Birrell (Belgium) Greet Minnen	6	5	[5]
(France) Fiona Ferro (Croatia) Jana Fett	5	6	[10]
8	(Ukraine) Anhelina Kalinina (Latvia) Jeļena Ostapenko	7	4	[6]
3	(United Kingdom) Katie Boulter (Serbia) Ivana Jorović	6	3	[6]
(Czech Republic) Simona Heinová (Russia) Anastasiya Komardina	1	6	[10]
(Romania) Jaqueline Adina Cristian (Ukraine) Olga Fridman
WC	(France) Tessah Andrianjafitrimo (France) Emmanuelle Salas	w/o
(Serbia) Katarina Jokić (Ukraine) Helen Ploskina	6	2	[10]
(Colombia) María Fernanda Herazo (Brazil) Leticia Garcia Vidal	4	6	[8]
(Slovakia) Viktória Kužmová (Slovakia) Kristína Schmiedlová	1	2
7	(United States) CiCi Bellis (Czech Republic) Markéta Vondroušová	6	6

Second round
(Brazil) L Stefani (Mexico) R Zarazúa	6	6
(United States) D Ivanova (United States) K Steffensen	4	3
(Italy) B Turati (China) W Zheng	6	6
(France) F Ferro (Croatia) J Fett	4	0
(Czech Republic) S Heinová (Russia) A Komardina	6	6
WC	(France) T Andrianjafitrimo (France) E Salas	2	2
(Serbia) K Jokić (Ukraine) H Ploskina	2	2
7	(United States) C Bellis (Czech Republic) M Vondroušová	6	6

Quarterfinals
(Brazil) L Stefani (Mexico) R Zarazúa	4	6	[10]
(Italy) B Turati (China) W Zheng	6	2	[4]
(Czech Republic) S Heinová (Russia) A Komardina	2	0
7	(United States) C Bellis (Czech Republic) M Vondroušová	6	6

Semifinals
(Brazil) L Stefani (Mexico) R Zarazúa	4	3
7	(United States) C Bellis (Czech Republic) M Vondroušová	6	6

=== Bottom half ===
First round
5	(China) Sun Ziyue (China) You Xiaodi	6	6
WC	(France) Estelle Cascino (Ecuador) Doménica González	3	3
(United States) Usue Maitane Arconada (Thailand) Kamonwan Buayam	3	3
(Romania) Elena Gabriela Ruse (Belarus) Iryna Shymanovich	6	6
(Slovakia) Tereza Mihalíková (Slovakia) Rebecca Šramková	6	3	[11]
(Russia) Anna Kalinskaya (Russia) Evgeniya Levashova	1	6	[9]
WC	(France) Lucie Wargnier (France) Margot Yerolymos	2	3
4	(Australia) Naiktha Bains (United States) Tornado Alicia Black	6	6
6	(Hungary) Anna Bondár (Hungary) Fanny Stollár	6	6
WC	(France) Alice Ramé (France) Vinciane Rémy	4	4
(Austria) Julia Grabher (Russia) Natalia Vikhlyantseva	2	4
(Spain) Paula Badosa (Spain) Aliona Bolsova Zadoinov	6	6
(Romania) Ioana Ducu (Romania) Ioana Loredana Roșca	4	6	[10]
(United States) Sofia Kenin (United States) Kaitlyn McCarthy	6	4	[5]
(Egypt) Sandra Samir (United Kingdom) Isabelle Wallace	6^{4}	4
2	(Australia) Priscilla Hon (Switzerland) Jil Belen Teichmann	7^{7}	6

Second round
5	(China) Z Sun (China) X You	2	4
(Romania) EG Ruse (Belarus) I Shymanovich	6	6
(Slovakia) T Mihalíková (Slovakia) R Šramková	6^{5}	6	[7]
4	(Australia) N Bains (United States) TA Black	7^{7}	2	[10]
6	(Hungary) A Bondár (Hungary) F Stollár	3	6	[11]
(Spain) P Badosa (Spain) A Bolsova Zadoinov	6	3	[13]
(Romania) I Ducu (Romania) IL Roșca	6	7
2	(Australia) P Hon (Switzerland) JB Teichmann	1	5

Quarterfinals
(Romania) EG Ruse (Belarus) I Shymanovich	2	1
4	(Australia) N Bains (United States) TA Black	6	6
(Spain) P Badosa (Spain) A Bolsova Zadoinov	1	6^{3}
(Romania) I Ducu (Romania) IL Roșca	6	7^{7}

Semifinals
4	(Australia) N Bains (United States) TA Black	3	3
(Romania) I Ducu (Romania) IL Roșca	6	6
