= 2014 French Open – Wheelchair women's singles =

Wheelchair women's singles
- 2014 French Open

Final
- Champion: (Japan) Yui Kamiji
- Runner-up: (Netherlands) Aniek van Koot
- Score: 7–6^{(9–7)}, 6–4

Events
Singles	men	women		boys	girls
Doubles	men	women	mixed	boys	girls
WC Singles	men	women	quad
WC Doubles	men	women	quad
Legends	−45	45+	women
- French Open

Yui Kamiji defeated Aniek van Koot in the final, 7–6^{(9–7)}, 6–4 to win the women's singles wheelchair tennis title at the 2014 French Open.

Sabine Ellerbrock was the defending champion, but was defeated in the semifinals by van Koot.

== Seeds ==
1. (Japan) Yui Kamiji (champion)
2. (Germany) Sabine Ellerbrock (semifinals)

== Draw ==
Key

- Q = Qualifier
- WC = Wild card
- LL = Lucky loser
- Alt = Alternate
- ITF = ITF entry
- PR = Protected ranking
- SR = Special ranking
- SE = Special exempt
- JE = Junior exempt
- JR = Junior Accelerator Programme entrant
- CO = College Accelerator Programme entrant
- NG = Next Gen Accelerator Program entrant
- w/o = Walkover
- r = Retired
- d = Defaulted

=== Finals ===
Quarterfinals
1	(Japan) Yui Kamiji	6	6
(United Kingdom) Jordanne Whiley	2	2
(Netherlands) Marjolein Buis	3	6^{2}
(Netherlands) Jiske Griffioen	6	7^{7}
(South Africa) Kgothatso Montjane	3	4
(Netherlands) Aniek van Koot	6	6
WC	(France) Charlotte Famin	3	0
2	(Germany) Sabine Ellerbrock	6	6

Semifinals
1	(Japan) Yui Kamiji	5	6	7^{8}
(Netherlands) Jiske Griffioen	7	2	6^{6}
(Netherlands) Aniek van Koot	6	6
2	(Germany) Sabine Ellerbrock	2	2

Final
1	(Japan) Yui Kamiji	7^{9}	6
(Netherlands) Aniek van Koot	6^{7}	4
