= 2014 French Open – Wheelchair men's singles =

Wheelchair men's singles
- 2014 French Open

Final
- Champion: (Japan) Shingo Kunieda
- Runner-up: (France) Stéphane Houdet
- Score: 6–4, 6–1

Events
Singles	men	women		boys	girls
Doubles	men	women	mixed	boys	girls
WC Singles	men	women	quad
WC Doubles	men	women	quad
Legends	−45	45+	women
- French Open

Shingo Kunieda defeated the two-time defending champion Stéphane Houdet in the final, 6–4, 6–1 to win the men's singles wheelchair tennis title at the 2014 French Open. It was his fifth French Open singles title and 16th major singles title overall.

== Seeds ==
1. (Japan) Shingo Kunieda (champion)
2. (France) Stéphane Houdet (final)

== Draw ==
Key

- Q = Qualifier
- WC = Wild card
- LL = Lucky loser
- Alt = Alternate
- ITF = ITF entry
- PR = Protected ranking
- SR = Special ranking
- SE = Special exempt
- JE = Junior exempt
- JR = Junior Accelerator Programme entrant
- CO = College Accelerator Programme entrant
- NG = Next Gen Accelerator Program entrant
- w/o = Walkover
- r = Retired
- d = Defaulted

=== Finals ===
Quarterfinals
1	(Japan) Shingo Kunieda	6	6
WC	(France) Nicolas Peifer	4	0
(Belgium) Joachim Gérard	4	1
(Argentina) Gustavo Fernández	6	6
(United Kingdom) Gordon Reid	6	6^{7}	6
(Japan) Takuya Miki	1	7^{9}	4
(Netherlands) Maikel Scheffers	4	1
2	(France) Stéphane Houdet	6	6

Semifinals
1	(Japan) Shingo Kunieda	6	3	7
(Argentina) Gustavo Fernández	3	6	5
(United Kingdom) Gordon Reid	0	4
2	(France) Stéphane Houdet	6	6

Final
1	(Japan) Shingo Kunieda	6	6
2	(France) Stéphane Houdet	4	1
