= 2014 French Open – Boys' doubles =

Boys' doubles
- 2014 French Open

Final
- Champions: (France) Benjamin Bonzi (France) Quentin Halys
- Runners-up: (Austria) Lucas Miedler (Australia) Akira Santillan
- Score: 6–3, 6–3

Events
Singles	men	women		boys	girls
Doubles	men	women	mixed	boys	girls
WC Singles	men	women	quad
WC Doubles	men	women	quad
Legends	−45	45+	women
← 2013 ·	French Open	· 2015 →

Kyle Edmund and Frederico Ferreira Silva were the defending champions, but were not eligible to compete this year.

Benjamin Bonzi and Quentin Halys won the title, defeating Lucas Miedler and Akira Santillan in the final, 6–3, 6–3.

== Seeds ==
1. (United States) Stefan Kozlov / (Russia) Andrey Rublev (semifinals)
2. (United States) Michael Mmoh / (United States) Francis Tiafoe (first round)
3. (Japan) Naoki Nakagawa / (Japan) Jumpei Yamasaki (first round)
4. (Russia) Karen Khachanov / (Russia) Daniil Medvedev (quarterfinals)
5. (Brazil) Orlando Luz / (Brazil) João Menezes (semifinals)
6. (Peru) Nicolás Álvarez / (South Korea) Lee Duck-hee (second round)
7. (Poland) Kamil Majchrzak / (Poland) Jan Zieliński (first round)
8. (Spain) Pedro Martínez / (Spain) Jaume Antoni Munar Clar (quarterfinals)

== Draw ==
=== Key ===
- Q = Qualifier
- WC = Wild card
- LL = Lucky loser
- Alt = Alternate
- SE = Special exempt
- PR = Protected ranking
- ITF = ITF entry
- JE = Junior exempt
- w/o = Walkover
- r = Retired
- d = Defaulted
- SR = Special ranking

=== Finals ===
Semifinals
1	(United States) Stefan Kozlov (Russia) Andrey Rublev	3	0
(France) Benjamin Bonzi (France) Quentin Halys	6	6
(Austria) Lucas Miedler (Australia) Akira Santillan	7^{9}	6^{3}	[10]
5	(Brazil) Orlando Luz (Brazil) João Menezes	6^{7}	7^{7}	[5]

Final
(France) Benjamin Bonzi (France) Quentin Halys	6	6
(Austria) Lucas Miedler (Australia) Akira Santillan	3	3

=== Top half ===
First round
1	(United States) Stefan Kozlov (Russia) Andrey Rublev	6	6
WC	(France) Maxime Janvier (France) Alexandre Müller	4	1
(Serbia) Petar Čonkić (Poland) Hubert Hurkacz	6	3	[4]
(Cyprus) Petros Chrysochos (Peru) Juan José Rosas	2	6	[10]
(Dominican Republic) Peter Bertran (Uzbekistan) Jurabek Karimov	4	4
(Russia) Boris Pokotilov (Croatia) Nino Serdarušić	6	6
(Sweden) Daniel Appelgren (China) Zheng Weiqiang	4	2
8	(Spain) Pedro Martínez (Spain) Jaume Antoni Munar Clar	6	6
3	(Japan) Naoki Nakagawa (Japan) Jumpei Yamasaki	6^{6}	7	[7]
(Brazil) Rafael Matos (Brazil) Marcelo Zormann	7^{8}	5	[10]
(France) Benjamin Bonzi (France) Quentin Halys	7	6
(Australia) Omar Jasika (Germany) Viktor Kostin	5	2
(Italy) Filippo Baldi (Italy) Matteo Berrettini	6	6
(United States) Noah Rubin (United States) Henrik Wiersholm	3	2
(South Korea) Hong Seong-chan (South Korea) Kang Ku-keon	3	3
6	(Peru) Nicolás Álvarez (South Korea) Lee Duck-hee	6	6

Second round
1	(United States) S Kozlov (Russia) A Rublev	6	6
(Cyprus) P Chrysochos (Peru) JJ Rosas	1	4
(Russia) B Pokotilov (Croatia) N Serdarušić	3	4
8	(Spain) P Martínez (Spain) JA Munar Clar	6	6
(Brazil) R Matos (Brazil) M Zormann	6	1	[6]
(France) B Bonzi (France) Q Halys	4	6	[10]
(Italy) F Baldi (Italy) M Berrettini	6	7^{7}
6	(Peru) N Álvarez (South Korea) D-h Lee	4	6^{4}

Quarterfinals
1	(United States) S Kozlov (Russia) A Rublev	6	6
8	(Spain) P Martínez (Spain) JA Munar Clar	4	1
(France) B Bonzi (France) Q Halys	6	6
(Italy) F Baldi (Italy) M Berrettini	4	1

Semifinals
1	(United States) S Kozlov (Russia) A Rublev	3	0
(France) B Bonzi (France) Q Halys	6	6

=== Bottom half ===
First round
7	(Poland) Kamil Majchrzak (Poland) Jan Zieliński	6^{6}	6	[7]
(Austria) Lucas Miedler (Australia) Akira Santillan	7^{8}	4	[10]
(United States) Alex Rybakov (Argentina) Matías Zukas	7^{7}	7^{7}
WC	(France) Clément Larrière (France) Mandresy Rakotomalala	6^{1}	6^{3}
(United States) Taylor Harry Fritz (Australia) Marc Polmans	3	2
(Russia) Bogdan Bobrov (United States) Dennis Uspensky	6	6
WC	(France) Théo Fournerie (France) Louis Tessa	4	4
4	(Russia) Karen Khachanov (Russia) Daniil Medvedev	6	6
5	(Brazil) Orlando Luz (Brazil) João Menezes	6	6
(Japan) Ryotaro Matsumura (Japan) Ken Onishi	4	2
(Argentina) Francisco Bahamonde (Germany) Jan Choinski	6	6
WC	(France) Geoffrey Blancaneaux (France) Thomas Bréchemier	3	4
(Slovakia) Martin Blaško (Slovakia) Alex Molčan	3	7^{8}	[10]
(South Korea) Chung Yun-seong (South Korea) Oh Chan-yeong	6	6^{6}	[8]
(Romania) Bogdan Ionuț Apostol (Romania) Nicolae Frunză	6	7
2	(United States) Michael Mmoh (United States) Francis Tiafoe	4	5

Second round
(Austria) L Miedler (Australia) A Santillan	5	6	[10]
(United States) A Rybakov (Argentina) M Zukas	7	4	[4]
(Russia) B Bobrov (United States) D Uspensky	4	3
4	(Russia) K Khachanov (Russia) D Medvedev	6	6
5	(Brazil) O Luz (Brazil) J Menezes	6	6
(Argentina) F Bahamonde (Germany) J Choinski	4	1
(Slovakia) M Blaško (Slovakia) A Molčan	6^{4}	7	[10]
(Romania) BI Apostol (Romania) N Frunză	7^{7}	5	[8]

Quarterfinals
(Austria) L Miedler (Australia) A Santillan	7	6
4	(Russia) K Khachanov (Russia) D Medvedev	5	3
5	(Brazil) O Luz (Brazil) J Menezes	6	6
(Slovakia) M Blaško (Slovakia) A Molčan	4	3

Semifinals
(Austria) L Miedler (Australia) A Santillan	7^{9}	6^{3}	[10]
5	(Brazil) O Luz (Brazil) J Menezes	6^{7}	7^{7}	[5]
