= 2014 French Open – Wheelchair men's doubles =

Wheelchair men's doubles
- 2014 French Open

Final
- Champions: (Belgium) Joachim Gérard (France) Stéphane Houdet
- Runners-up: (Argentina) Gustavo Fernández (France) Nicolas Peifer
- Score: 4–6, 6–3, [11–9]

Events
Singles	men	women		boys	girls
Doubles	men	women	mixed	boys	girls
WC Singles	men	women	quad
WC Doubles	men	women	quad
Legends	−45	45+	women
- French Open

Defending champion Stéphane Houdet and his partner Joachim Gérard defeated Gustavo Fernández and Nicolas Peifer in the final, 4–6, 6–3, [11–9] to win the men's doubles wheelchair tennis title at the 2014 French Open. It was Houdet's second step towards a Grand Slam.

Houdet and Shingo Kunieda were the defending champions, but did not play together. Kunieda partnered Takuya Miki, but was defeated by Gérard and Houdet in the semifinals.

== Seeds ==
1. (Belgium) Joachim Gérard / (France) Stéphane Houdet (champions)
2. (United Kingdom) Gordon Reid / (Netherlands) Maikel Scheffers (semifinals)

== Draw ==
Key

- Q = Qualifier
- WC = Wild card
- LL = Lucky loser
- Alt = Alternate
- ITF = ITF entry
- PR = Protected ranking
- SR = Special ranking
- SE = Special exempt
- JE = Junior exempt
- JR = Junior Accelerator Programme entrant
- CO = College Accelerator Programme entrant
- NG = Next Gen Accelerator Program entrant
- w/o = Walkover
- r = Retired
- d = Defaulted

=== Finals ===
Semifinals
1	(Belgium) Joachim Gérard (France) Stéphane Houdet	7	3	[10]
(Japan) Shingo Kunieda (Japan) Takuya Miki	5	6	[8]
(Argentina) Gustavo Fernández (France) Nicolas Peifer	6	7^{9}
2	(United Kingdom) Gordon Reid (Netherlands) Maikel Scheffers	4	6^{7}

Final
1	(Belgium) Joachim Gérard (France) Stéphane Houdet	4	6	[11]
(Argentina) Gustavo Fernández (France) Nicolas Peifer	6	3	[9]
