= 2014 French Open – Legends under 45 doubles =

Legends under 45 doubles
- 2014 French Open

Final
- Champions: (France) Mansour Bahrami (France) Fabrice Santoro
- Runners-up: (France) Arnaud Clément (France) Nicolas Escudé
- Score: 6–2, 2–6, [11–9]

Events
Singles	men	women		boys	girls
Doubles	men	women	mixed	boys	girls
WC Singles	men	women	quad
WC Doubles	men	women	quad
Legends	−45	45+	women
← 2013 ·	French Open	· 2015 →

Cédric Pioline and Fabrice Santoro were the defending champions, but Pioline instead competed in the Legends Over 45 Doubles event. Santoro played alongside Sébastien Grosjean in the round robin.

Mansour Bahrami and Fabrice Santoro won the title, defeating Arnaud Clément and Nicolas Escudé in the final, 6–2, 2–6, [11–9].

== Draw ==
=== Key ===
- Q = Qualifier
- WC = Wild card
- LL = Lucky loser
- Alt = Alternate
- ITF = ITF entry
- PR = Protected ranking
- SR = Special ranking
- SE = Special exempt
- JE = Junior exempt
- JR = Junior Accelerator Programme entrant
- CO = College Accelerator Programme entrant
- NG = Next Gen Accelerator Program entrant
- w/o = Walkover
- r = Retired
- d = Defaulted

=== Final ===
Final
(France) Arnaud Clément (France) Nicolas Escudé	2	6	[9]
(France) Mansour Bahrami (France) Fabrice Santoro	6	2	[11]

=== Group A ===
		(France) A Clément (France) N Escudé	(Spain) A Costa (Spain) C Moyá	(Sweden) T Enqvist (Argentina) G Gaudio	RR; W–L	Set; W–L	Game; W–L	Standings
A1	(France) Arnaud Clément (France) Nicolas Escudé		6–3, 4–6, [10–8]	6–4, 6–4	2–0	4–1	23–17	1
A2	(Spain) Albert Costa (Spain) Carlos Moyá	3–6, 6–4, [8–10]		6–4, 7–6^{(8–6)}	1–1	3–2	23–21	2
A3	(Sweden) Thomas Enqvist (Argentina) Gastón Gaudio	4–6, 4–6	4–6, 6–7^{(6–8)}		0–2	0–4	18–25	3

Standings are determined by: 1. number of wins; 2. number of matches; 3. in three-players-ties, percentage of sets won, or of games won; 4. steering-committee decision.

=== Group B ===
		(France) S Grosjean (France) F Santoro	(Spain) S Bruguera (Ukraine) A Medvedev	(Croatia) G Ivanišević (Australia) T Woodbridge	RR; W–L	Set; W–L	Game; W–L	Standings
B1	(France) Sébastien Grosjean (France) Fabrice Santoro		4–6, 6–3, [10–6]	3–6, 6–4, [10–7]	2–0	4–2	20–20	1
B2	(Spain) Sergi Bruguera (Ukraine) Andriy Medvedev	6–4, 3–6, [6–10]		4–6, 4–6	0–2	1–4	17–23	3
B3	(Croatia) Goran Ivanišević (Australia) Todd Woodbridge	6–3, 4–6, [7–10]	6–4, 6–4		1–1	3–2	22–18	2

Standings are determined by: 1. number of wins; 2. number of matches; 3. in three-players-ties, percentage of sets won, or of games won; 4. steering-committee decision.
