= 2014 French Open – Mixed doubles =

Mixed doubles
- 2014 French Open

Final
- Champions: (Germany) Anna-Lena Grönefeld (Netherlands) Jean-Julien Rojer
- Runners-up: (Germany) Julia Görges (Serbia) Nenad Zimonjić
- Score: 4–6, 6–2, [10–7]

Details
- Draw: 32
- Seeds: 8

Events
Singles	men	women		boys	girls
Doubles	men	women	mixed	boys	girls
WC Singles	men	women	quad
WC Doubles	men	women	quad
Legends	−45	45+	women
- French Open

Lucie Hradecká and František Čermák were the defending champions, but Čermák chose not to participate this year. Hradecká played alongside Mariusz Fyrstenberg but lost in the second round to the eventual champions Anna-Lena Grönefeld and Jean-Julien Rojer.

Anna-Lena Grönefeld and Jean-Julien Rojer defeated Julia Görges and Nenad Zimonjić 4–6, 6–2, [10–7] in the final.

== Seeds ==
1. (United States) Abigail Spears / (Austria) Alexander Peya (second round)
2. (Slovenia) Katarina Srebotnik / (India) Rohan Bopanna (quarterfinals)
3. (Kazakhstan) Yaroslava Shvedova / (Brazil) Bruno Soares (semifinals)
4. (Czech Republic) Květa Peschke / (Poland) Marcin Matkowski (first round)
5. (France) Kristina Mladenovic / (Canada) Daniel Nestor (quarterfinals)
6. (Czech Republic) Lucie Hradecká / (Poland) Mariusz Fyrstenberg (second round)
7. (Spain) Anabel Medina Garrigues / (Spain) David Marrero (first round)
8. (Germany) Julia Görges / (Serbia) Nenad Zimonjić (final)

== Main draw ==
Key

- Q = Qualifier
- WC = Wild card
- LL = Lucky loser
- Alt = Alternate
- ITF = ITF entry
- PR = Protected ranking
- SR = Special ranking
- SE = Special exempt
- JE = Junior exempt
- JR = Junior Accelerator Programme entrant
- CO = College Accelerator Programme entrant
- NG = Next Gen Accelerator Program entrant
- w/o = Walkover
- r = Retired
- d = Defaulted

=== Finals ===
Semifinals
(Germany) Anna-Lena Grönefeld (Netherlands) Jean-Julien Rojer	3	7^{7}	[10]
3	(Kazakhstan) Yaroslava Shvedova (Brazil) Bruno Soares	6	6^{4}	[5]
(Hungary) Tímea Babos (United States) Eric Butorac	2	2
8	(Germany) Julia Görges (Serbia) Nenad Zimonjić	6	6

Final
(Germany) Anna-Lena Grönefeld (Netherlands) Jean-Julien Rojer	4	6	[10]
8	(Germany) Julia Görges (Serbia) Nenad Zimonjić	6	2	[7]

=== Top half ===
First round
1	(United States) A Spears (Austria) A Peya	6	6
(Czech Republic) I Melzer (Austria) J Melzer	4	2
(Spain) A Parra Santonja (Mexico) S González	7^{7}	6
(United States) L Raymond (Australia) J Peers	6^{2}	2
(Germany) A-L Grönefeld (Netherlands) J-J Rojer	7	6
(China) J Zheng (United States) S Lipsky	5	3
WC	(France) J Coin (France) N Mahut	6	6^{10}	[8]
6	(Czech Republic) L Hradecká (Poland) M Fyrstenberg	1	7^{12}	[10]
3	(Kazakhstan) Y Shvedova (Brazil) B Soares	6	5	[10]
(Australia) C Dellacqua (United Kingdom) J Murray	3	7	[6]
WC	(France) A Lim (France) J Chardy	7	6
WC	(France) M Johansson (France) A Mannarino	5	3
(Australia) A Rodionova (United Kingdom) C Fleming	6	3	[8]
(United States) R Kops-Jones (South Africa) R Klaasen	3	6	[10]
(Chinese Taipei) H-c Chan (Belarus) M Mirnyi	6^{1}	4
5	(France) K Mladenovic (Canada) D Nestor	7^{7}	6

Second round
1	(United States) A Spears (Austria) A Peya	7	3	[4]
(Spain) A Parra Santonja (Mexico) S González	5	6	[10]
(Germany) A-L Grönefeld (Netherlands) J-J Rojer	6^{8}	6	[10]
6	(Czech Republic) L Hradecká (Poland) M Fyrstenberg	7^{10}	2	[5]
3	(Kazakhstan) Y Shvedova (Brazil) B Soares	6	6
WC	(France) A Lim (France) J Chardy	3	4
(United States) R Kops-Jones (South Africa) R Klaasen	3	2
5	(France) K Mladenovic (Canada) D Nestor	6	6

Quarterfinals
(Spain) A Parra Santonja (Mexico) S González	2	4
(Germany) A-L Grönefeld (Netherlands) J-J Rojer	6	6
3	(Kazakhstan) Y Shvedova (Brazil) B Soares	6	1	[10]
5	(France) K Mladenovic (Canada) D Nestor	3	6	[3]

Semifinals
(Germany) A-L Grönefeld (Netherlands) J-J Rojer	3	7^{7}	[10]
3	(Kazakhstan) Y Shvedova (Brazil) B Soares	6	6^{4}	[5]

=== Bottom half ===
First round
7	(Spain) A Medina Garrigues (Spain) D Marrero	6	5	[5]
WC	(France) A Cornet (France) J Eysseric	2	7	[10]
(Poland) K Jans-Ignacik (United Kingdom) D Inglot	6	6
(Poland) A Rosolska (Sweden) J Brunström	4	4
(Hungary) T Babos (United States) E Butorac	5	7	[10]
(Slovakia) J Husárová (Austria) O Marach	7	5	[3]
(India) S Mirza (Romania) H Tecău	4	6	[10]
4	(Czech Republic) K Peschke (Poland) M Matkowski	6	3	[7]
8	(Germany) J Görges (Serbia) N Zimonjić	6	7
Alt	(United States) M Moulton-Levy (United States) N Monroe	1	5
(United States) L Huber (Colombia) JS Cabal	6	6
WC	(France) S Foretz Gacon (France) É Roger-Vasselin	3	2
(Zimbabwe) C Black (Colombia) R Farah	6	6
(Russia) A Kudryavtseva (Philippines) T Huey	4	4
(Czech Republic) A Hlaváčková (Spain) M López	6^{3}	5
2	(Slovenia) K Srebotnik (India) R Bopanna	7^{7}	7

Second round
WC	(France) A Cornet (France) J Eysseric	7^{12}	3	[11]
(Poland) K Jans-Ignacik (United Kingdom) D Inglot	6^{10}	6	[9]
(Hungary) T Babos (United States) E Butorac	1	6	[10]
(India) S Mirza (Romania) H Tecău	6	4	[7]
8	(Germany) J Görges (Serbia) N Zimonjić	6	6
(United States) L Huber (Colombia) JS Cabal	0	1
(Zimbabwe) C Black (Colombia) R Farah	3	6	[7]
2	(Slovenia) K Srebotnik (India) R Bopanna	6	3	[10]

Quarterfinals
WC	(France) A Cornet (France) J Eysseric	4	3
(Hungary) T Babos (United States) E Butorac	6	6
8	(Germany) J Görges (Serbia) N Zimonjić	2	6	[10]
2	(Slovenia) K Srebotnik (India) R Bopanna	6	4	[5]

Semifinals
(Hungary) T Babos (United States) E Butorac	2	2
8	(Germany) J Görges (Serbia) N Zimonjić	6	6
