= 2014 French Open – Legends over 45 doubles =

Legends over 45 doubles
- 2014 French Open

Final
- Champion: (United States) John McEnroe (United States) Patrick McEnroe
- Runner-up: (Ecuador) Andrés Gómez (Australia) Mark Woodforde
- Score: 4–6, 7–5, [10–7]

Events
Singles	men	women		boys	girls
Doubles	men	women	mixed	boys	girls
WC Singles	men	women	quad
WC Doubles	men	women	quad
Legends	−45	45+	women
← 2013 ·	French Open	· 2015 →

Andrés Gómez and Mark Woodforde were the defending champions, but lost to John and Patrick McEnroe in the final, 6–4, 5–7, [7–10].

== Draw ==
=== Key ===
- Q = Qualifier
- WC = Wild card
- LL = Lucky loser
- Alt = Alternate
- ITF = ITF entry
- PR = Protected ranking
- SR = Special ranking
- SE = Special exempt
- JE = Junior exempt
- JR = Junior Accelerator Programme entrant
- CO = College Accelerator Programme entrant
- NG = Next Gen Accelerator Program entrant
- w/o = Walkover
- r = Retired
- d = Defaulted

=== Final ===
Final
(Ecuador) Andrés Gómez (Australia) Mark Woodforde	6	5	[7]
(United States) John McEnroe (United States) Patrick McEnroe	4	7	[10]

=== Group C ===
		(Ecuador) A Gómez (Australia) M Woodforde	(Sweden) M Pernfors (Sweden) M Wilander	(France) M Bahrami (France) C Pioline	RR; W–L	Set; W–L	Game; W–L	Standings
C1	(Ecuador) Andrés Gómez (Australia) Mark Woodforde		6–2, 7–5	4–6, 7–6^{(7–3)}, [9–11]	1–1	3–2	24–20	1
C2	(Sweden) Mikael Pernfors (Sweden) Mats Wilander	2–6, 5–7		6–2, 6–4	1–1	2–2	19–19	2
C3	(France) Mansour Bahrami (France) Cédric Pioline	6–4, 6–7^{(3–7)}, [11–9]	2–6, 4–6		1–1	2–3	17–23	3

Standings are determined by: 1. number of wins; 2. number of matches; 3. in three-players-ties, percentage of sets won, or of games won; 4. steering-committee decision.

=== Group D ===
		(United States) J McEnroe (United States) P McEnroe	(Australia) P Cash (Netherlands) P Haarhuis	(France) G Forget (France) H Leconte	RR; W–L	Set; W–L	Game; W–L	Standings
D1	(United States) John McEnroe (United States) Patrick McEnroe		6–4, 6–2	7–6^{(7–3)}, 6–3	2–0	4–0	25–15	1
D2	(Australia) Pat Cash (Netherlands) Paul Haarhuis	4–6, 2–6		6–3, 7–6^{(7–3)}	1–1	2–2	19–21	2
D3	(France) Guy Forget (France) Henri Leconte	6–7^{(3–7)}, 3–6	3–6, 6–7^{(3–7)}		0–2	0–4	18–26	3

Standings are determined by: 1. number of wins; 2. number of matches; 3. in three-players-ties, percentage of sets won, or of games won; 4. steering-committee decision.
