= 2014 French Open – Men's doubles =

Men's doubles
- 2014 French Open

Final
- Champions: (France) Julien Benneteau (France) Édouard Roger-Vasselin
- Runners-up: (Spain) Marcel Granollers (Spain) Marc López
- Score: 6–3, 7–6^{(7–1)}

Details
- Draw: 64
- Seeds: 16

Events
Singles	men	women		boys	girls
Doubles	men	women	mixed	boys	girls
WC Singles	men	women	quad
WC Doubles	men	women	quad
Legends	−45	45+	women
← 2013 ·	French Open	· 2015 →

Bob and Mike Bryan were the defending champions, but lost in the quarterfinals to Marcel Granollers and Marc López.

Julien Benneteau and Édouard Roger-Vasselin won the title and ended a thirty-year drought of victories by French players in Men's Doubles at the French Open. They won against Marcel Granollers and Marc López 6–3, 7–6^{(7–1)} in the final.

== Seeds ==
1. (United States) Bob Bryan / (United States) Mike Bryan (quarterfinals)
2. (Austria) Alexander Peya / (Brazil) Bruno Soares (second round)
3. (Canada) Daniel Nestor / (Serbia) Nenad Zimonjić (quarterfinals)
4. (Spain) David Marrero / (Spain) Fernando Verdasco (second round)
5. (France) Michaël Llodra / (France) Nicolas Mahut (third round, retired)
6. (India) Rohan Bopanna / (Pakistan) Aisam-ul-Haq Qureshi (second round)
7. (Philippines) Treat Huey / (United Kingdom) Dominic Inglot (second round)
8. (Poland) Mariusz Fyrstenberg / (Poland) Marcin Matkowski (first round)
9. (Poland) Łukasz Kubot / (Sweden) Robert Lindstedt (quarterfinals)
10. (Colombia) Juan Sebastián Cabal / (Colombia) Robert Farah (first round)
11. (France) Julien Benneteau / (France) Édouard Roger-Vasselin (champions)
12. (Spain) Marcel Granollers / (Spain) Marc López (final)
13. (Netherlands) Jean-Julien Rojer / (Romania) Horia Tecău (third round)
14. (United States) Eric Butorac / (South Africa) Raven Klaasen (second round)
15. (United Kingdom) Jamie Murray / (Australia) John Peers (third round)
16. (Uruguay) Pablo Cuevas / (Argentina) Horacio Zeballos (second round)

== Main draw ==
=== Key ===
- Q = Qualifier
- WC = Wild card
- LL = Lucky loser
- Alt = Alternate
- ITF = ITF entry
- PR = Protected ranking
- SR = Special ranking
- SE = Special exempt
- JE = Junior exempt
- JR = Junior Accelerator Programme entrant
- CO = College Accelerator Programme entrant
- NG = Next Gen Accelerator Program entrant
- w/o = Walkover
- r = Retired
- d = Defaulted

=== Finals ===
Quarterfinals
1	(United States) Bob Bryan (United States) Mike Bryan	4	2
12	(Spain) Marcel Granollers (Spain) Marc López	6	6
3	(Canada) Daniel Nestor (Serbia) Nenad Zimonjić	7^{7}	3	6^{5}
(Croatia) Marin Draganja (Romania) Florin Mergea	6^{2}	6	7^{7}
9	(Poland) Łukasz Kubot (Sweden) Robert Lindstedt	3	3
(Kazakhstan) Andrey Golubev (Australia) Samuel Groth	6	6
11	(France) Julien Benneteau (France) Édouard Roger-Vasselin	7	4	7^{7}
(Argentina) Máximo González (Argentina) Juan Mónaco	5	6	6^{5}

Semifinals
12	(Spain) Marcel Granollers (Spain) Marc López	6	1	6
(Croatia) Marin Draganja (Romania) Florin Mergea	3	6	3
(Kazakhstan) Andrey Golubev (Australia) Samuel Groth	6	3	4
11	(France) Julien Benneteau (France) Édouard Roger-Vasselin	3	6	6

Final
12	(Spain) Marcel Granollers (Spain) Marc López	3	6^{1}
11	(France) Julien Benneteau (France) Édouard Roger-Vasselin	6	7^{7}

=== Top half ===
==== Section 1 ====
First round
1	(United States) B Bryan (United States) M Bryan	6	6
(Germany) M Emmrich (Germany) C Kas	2	1
WC	(France) J Eysseric (France) M Gicquel	6	6
(Italy) A Seppi (Italy) F Volandri	3	4
PR	(Italy) S Bolelli (Italy) F Fognini	6	6
(Poland) T Bednarek (Czech Republic) L Dlouhý	4	4
(Canada) V Pospisil (United States) R Ram	1	6	6^{2}
15	(United Kingdom) J Murray (Australia) J Peers	6	4	7^{7}
12	(Spain) M Granollers (Spain) M López	7	6
(Sweden) J Brunström (Denmark) F Nielsen	5	2
(Austria) J Knowle (Slovakia) M Mertiňák	4	2
(Spain) G García-López (Austria) P Oswald	6	6
(Croatia) M Pavić (Brazil) A Sá	6	6
(United Kingdom) K Skupski (New Zealand) M Venus	2	3
(Colombia) S Giraldo (Colombia) A González	3	6	3
7	(Philippines) T Huey (United Kingdom) D Inglot	6	3	6

Second round
1	(United States) B Bryan (United States) M Bryan	6	6
WC	(France) J Eysseric (France) M Gicquel	3	3
PR	(Italy) S Bolelli (Italy) F Fognini	4	3
15	(United Kingdom) J Murray (Australia) J Peers	6	6
12	(Spain) M Granollers (Spain) M López	4	6	6
(Spain) G García-López (Austria) P Oswald	6	0	3
(Croatia) M Pavić (Brazil) A Sá	7^{7}	7^{8}
7	(Philippines) T Huey (United Kingdom) D Inglot	6^{5}	6^{6}

Third round
1	(United States) B Bryan (United States) M Bryan	6	6
15	(United Kingdom) J Murray (Australia) J Peers	3	1
12	(Spain) M Granollers (Spain) M López	6	6
(Croatia) M Pavić (Brazil) A Sá	2	1

Quarterfinals
1	(United States) B Bryan (United States) M Bryan	4	2
12	(Spain) M Granollers (Spain) M López	6	6

==== Section 2 ====
First round
3	(Canada) D Nestor (Serbia) N Zimonjić	6	3	6
(Australia) M Ebden (Russia) D Tursunov	2	6	3
(Spain) R Bautista Agut (Netherlands) I Sijsling	7^{10}	3	6
PR	(Czech Republic) J Levinský (Germany) P Marx	6^{8}	6	1
(United States) N Monroe (Germany) S Stadler	6	7
(Slovakia) M Kližan (Austria) D Thiem	3	5
(France) A Mannarino (France) B Paire	4	0
13	(Netherlands) J-J Rojer (Romania) H Tecău	6	6
10	(Colombia) JS Cabal (Colombia) R Farah	4	3
(Finland) H Kontinen (Finland) J Nieminen	6	6
WC	(France) P-H Herbert (France) A Olivetti	6^{4}	3
(Spain) F López (Austria) J Melzer	7^{7}	6
(Russia) T Gabashvili (Kazakhstan) M Kukushkin	7^{7}	6
Alt	(United States) B Klahn (United Kingdom) N Skupski	6^{5}	4
(Croatia) M Draganja (Romania) F Mergea	7^{7}	6
8	(Poland) M Fyrstenberg (Poland) M Matkowski	6^{5}	3

Second round
3	(Canada) D Nestor (Serbia) N Zimonjić	6	6^{5}	6
(Spain) R Bautista Agut (Netherlands) I Sijsling	3	7^{7}	3
(United States) N Monroe (Germany) S Stadler	3	0
13	(Netherlands) J-J Rojer (Romania) H Tecău	6	6
(Finland) H Kontinen (Finland) J Nieminen	3	4
(Spain) F López (Austria) J Melzer	6	6
(Russia) T Gabashvili (Kazakhstan) M Kukushkin	3	4
(Croatia) M Draganja (Romania) F Mergea	6	6

Third round
3	(Canada) D Nestor (Serbia) N Zimonjić	6	7
13	(Netherlands) J-J Rojer (Romania) H Tecău	4	5
(Spain) F López (Austria) J Melzer	5	3
(Croatia) M Draganja (Romania) F Mergea	7	6

Quarterfinals
3	(Canada) D Nestor (Serbia) N Zimonjić	7^{7}	3	6^{5}
(Croatia) M Draganja (Romania) F Mergea	6^{2}	6	7^{7}

=== Bottom half ===
==== Section 3 ====
First round
6	(India) R Bopanna (Pakistan) A-u-H Qureshi	7	6^{4}	7
Alt	(Australia) R Junaid (India) D Sharan	5	7^{7}	5
(Israel) J Erlich (Brazil) M Melo	4	7^{7}	7^{7}
(Czech Republic) F Čermák (Russia) M Elgin	6	6^{1}	6^{4}
(France) J Chardy (Austria) O Marach	6	7
WC	(France) M Bourgue (France) P-H Mathieu	1	5
(Australia) C Guccione (Australia) L Hewitt	5	6	2
9	(Poland) Ł Kubot (Sweden) R Lindstedt	7	3	6
16	(Uruguay) P Cuevas (Argentina) H Zeballos	7	7^{7}
(Argentina) F Bagnis (Argentina) F Delbonis	5	6^{1}
(United States) J Sock (Portugal) J Sousa	7	7^{9}
(Spain) P Andújar (Argentina) L Mayer	5	6^{7}
(Argentina) C Berlocq (Italy) D Bracciali	3	6	5
(Kazakhstan) A Golubev (Australia) S Groth	6	2	7
WC	(France) T Lamasine (France) L Lokoli	4	2
4	(Spain) D Marrero (Spain) F Verdasco	6	6

Second round
6	(India) R Bopanna (Pakistan) A-u-H Qureshi	3	4
(Israel) J Erlich (Brazil) M Melo	6	6
(France) J Chardy (Austria) O Marach	4	1
9	(Poland) Ł Kubot (Sweden) R Lindstedt	6	6
16	(Uruguay) P Cuevas (Argentina) H Zeballos	6	3	2
(United States) J Sock (Portugal) J Sousa	3	6	6
(Kazakhstan) A Golubev (Australia) S Groth	7^{9}	6
4	(Spain) D Marrero (Spain) F Verdasco	6^{7}	4

Third round
(Israel) J Erlich (Brazil) M Melo	4	6^{5}
9	(Poland) Ł Kubot (Sweden) R Lindstedt	6	7^{7}
(United States) J Sock (Portugal) J Sousa	4	3
(Kazakhstan) A Golubev (Australia) S Groth	6	6

Quarterfinals
9	(Poland) Ł Kubot (Sweden) R Lindstedt	3	3
(Kazakhstan) A Golubev (Australia) S Groth	6	6

==== Section 4 ====
First round
5	(France) M Llodra (France) N Mahut	6	6
WC	(France) G Monfils (France) J Ouanna	4	1
(Mexico) S González (United States) S Lipsky	7^{8}	6
PR	(United Kingdom) C Fleming (United Kingdom) R Hutchins	6^{6}	4
(Belarus) M Mirnyi (Russia) M Youzhny	6	3	3
(Colombia) A Falla (Australia) M Matosevic	4	6	6
(Germany) B Becker (Chinese Taipei) Y-h Lu	3	6	0
11	(France) J Benneteau (France) É Roger-Vasselin	6	4	6
14	(United States) E Butorac (South Africa) R Klaasen	7^{7}	6
(United States) S Johnson (United States) S Querrey	6^{3}	1
(Argentina) M González (Argentina) J Mónaco	6	6
WC	(France) F Serra (France) M Teixeira	4	4
(Germany) A Begemann (Netherlands) R Haase	6	4	6
WC	(France) F Martin (France) H Nys	3	6	3
(Uzbekistan) D Istomin (Czech Republic) L Rosol	5	4
2	(Austria) A Peya (Brazil) B Soares	7	6

Second round
5	(France) M Llodra (France) N Mahut	7^{7}	6
(Mexico) S González (United States) S Lipsky	6^{2}	4
(Colombia) A Falla (Australia) M Matosevic	6	5	0
11	(France) J Benneteau (France) É Roger-Vasselin	1	7	6
14	(United States) E Butorac (South Africa) R Klaasen	7	4	4
(Argentina) M González (Argentina) J Mónaco	5	6	6
(Germany) A Begemann (Netherlands) R Haase	5	6	6
2	(Austria) A Peya (Brazil) B Soares	7	4	4

Third round
5	(France) M Llodra (France) N Mahut	1^{r}
11	(France) J Benneteau (France) É Roger-Vasselin	2
(Argentina) M González (Argentina) J Mónaco	6	3	6
(Germany) A Begemann (Netherlands) R Haase	1	6	3

Quarterfinals
11	(France) J Benneteau (France) É Roger-Vasselin	7	4	7^{7}
(Argentina) M González (Argentina) J Mónaco	5	6	6^{5}
