= 2014 French Open – Women's legends doubles =

Women's legends doubles
- 2014 French Open

Final
- Champion: (Belgium) Kim Clijsters (United States) Martina Navratilova
- Runner-up: (France) Nathalie Dechy (France) Sandrine Testud
- Score: 5–7, 7–5, [10–7]

Events
Singles	men	women		boys	girls
Doubles	men	women	mixed	boys	girls
WC Singles	men	women	quad
WC Doubles	men	women	quad
Legends	−45	45+	women
← 2013 ·	French Open	· 2015 →

Lindsay Davenport and Martina Hingis were the defending champions, but Hingis instead competed in the Women's Doubles event. Davenport played alongside Mary Joe Fernández and was eliminated in the round robin.

Kim Clijsters and Martina Navratilova won the title, defeating Nathalie Dechy and Sandrine Testud in the final, 5–7, 7–5, [10–7].

== Draw ==
=== Key ===
- Q = Qualifier
- WC = Wild card
- LL = Lucky loser
- Alt = Alternate
- ITF = ITF entry
- PR = Protected ranking
- SR = Special ranking
- SE = Special exempt
- JE = Junior exempt
- JR = Junior Accelerator Programme entrant
- CO = College Accelerator Programme entrant
- NG = Next Gen Accelerator Program entrant
- w/o = Walkover
- r = Retired
- d = Defaulted

=== Final ===
Final
(France) Nathalie Dechy (France) Sandrine Testud	7	5	[7]
(Belgium) Kim Clijsters (United States) Martina Navratilova	5	7	[10]

=== Group A ===
		(United States) L Davenport (United States) MJ Fernández	(France) N Dechy (France) S Testud	(Czech Republic) J Novotná (Belarus) N Zvereva	RR; W–L	Set; W–L	Game; W–L	Standings
A1	(United States) Lindsay Davenport (United States) Mary Joe Fernández		2–6, 1–6	6–3, 6–2	1–1	2–2	15–17	2
A2	(France) Nathalie Dechy (France) Sandrine Testud	6–2, 6–1		6–3, 6–4	2–0	4–0	24–10	1
A3	(Czech Republic) Jana Novotná (Belarus) Natasha Zvereva	3–6, 2–6	3–6, 4–6		0–2	0–4	12–24	3

Standings are determined by: 1. number of wins; 2. number of matches; 3. in three-players-ties, percentage of sets won, or of games won; 4. steering-committee decision.

=== Group B ===
		(Belgium) K Clijsters (United States) M Navratilova	(Croatia) I Majoli (Russia) A Myskina	(Spain) C Martínez (France) N Tauziat	RR; W–L	Set; W–L	Game; W–L	Standings
B1	(Belgium) Kim Clijsters (United States) Martina Navratilova		6–2, 4–6, [10–8]	3–6, 6–1, [10–2]	2–0	4–2	21–15	1
B2	(Croatia) Iva Majoli (Russia) Anastasia Myskina	2–6, 6–4, [8–10]		3–6, 6–2, [10–7]	1–1	3–3	18–20	2
B3	(Spain) Conchita Martínez (France) Nathalie Tauziat	6–3, 1–6, [2–10]	6–3, 2–6, [7–10]		0–2	2–4	15–20	3

Standings are determined by: 1. number of wins; 2. number of matches; 3. in three-players-ties, percentage of sets won, or of games won; 4. steering-committee decision.
