= 2011 Büschl Open – Doubles =

Doubles
- 2011 Büschl Open

Final
- Champions: (Netherlands) Kiki Bertens (United Kingdom) Anne Keothavong
- Runners-up: (Germany) Kristina Barrois (Austria) Yvonne Meusburger
- Score: 6–3, 6–3

Events
Singles	Doubles
← 2010 ·	Büschl Open	· 2012 →

Kristina Barrois and Anna-Lena Grönefeld were the defending champions, but Grönefeld decided not to participate. Barrois partnered up with Yvonne Meusburger, but lost in the final to Kiki Bertens and Anne Keothavong.

Kiki Bertens and Anne Keothavong won the title defeating Kristina Barrois and Yvonne Meusburger in the final 6–3, 6–3.

== Seeds ==
1. (Austria) Sandra Klemenschits / (Germany) Tatjana Malek (semifinals)
2. (Germany) Kristina Barrois / (Austria) Yvonne Meusburger (final)
3. (Czech Republic) Eva Birnerová / (Germany) Kathrin Wörle (semifinals)
4. (Netherlands) Kiki Bertens / (United Kingdom) Anne Keothavong (champions)

== Draw ==
=== Key ===
- Q = Qualifier
- WC = Wild card
- LL = Lucky loser
- Alt = Alternate
- ITF = ITF entry
- PR = Protected ranking
- SR = Special ranking
- SE = Special exempt
- JE = Junior exempt
- JR = Junior Accelerator Programme entrant
- CO = College Accelerator Programme entrant
- NG = Next Gen Accelerator Program entrant
- w/o = Walkover
- r = Retired
- d = Defaulted

=== Draw ===
First round
(Slovakia) L Juríková (Slovakia) K Kučová	6	6
WC	(Germany) S Kastner (Romania) P Lăncrănjan	1	2
4	(Netherlands) K Bertens (United Kingdom) A Keothavong	6	6
(Germany) S Haas (Germany) C Shakovets	2	1
(Germany) A Beck (Germany) D Pfizenmaier	6	5	[6]
(Latvia) D Marcinkēviča (Liechtenstein) S Vogt	4	7	[10]
(Romania) M Gojnea (Slovenia) M Zec Peškirič	6	6
WC	(Germany) LM Huber (Germany) N-I Scholten	3	1
(Slovenia) D Jakupovič (Germany) S-R Sekulic	0	0
3	(Czech Republic) E Birnerová (Germany) K Wörle	6	6
(Ukraine) T Arefyeva (Russia) V Solovieva	w/o
(Germany) K Grajdek (Germany) A Zaja

Quarterfinals
1	(Austria) S Klemenschits (Germany) T Malek	6	6
(Slovakia) L Juríková (Slovakia) K Kučová	2	4
4	(Netherlands) K Bertens (United Kingdom) A Keothavong	6	6
(Latvia) D Marcinkēviča (Liechtenstein) S Vogt	1	4
(Romania) M Gojnea (Slovenia) M Zec Peškirič	0	3
3	(Czech Republic) E Birnerová (Germany) K Wörle	6	6
(Ukraine) T Arefyeva (Russia) V Solovieva	6	1	[8]
2	(Germany) K Barrois (Austria) Y Meusburger	2	6	[10]

Semifinals
1	(Austria) S Klemenschits (Germany) T Malek	6	3	[3]
4	(Netherlands) K Bertens (United Kingdom) A Keothavong	3	6	[10]
3	(Czech Republic) E Birnerová (Germany) K Wörle	4	1
2	(Germany) K Barrois (Austria) Y Meusburger	6	6

Finals
4	(Netherlands) K Bertens (United Kingdom) A Keothavong	6	6
2	(Germany) K Barrois (Austria) Y Meusburger	3	3
