= 2011 Büschl Open =

- Date: 31 October – 6 November
- Edition: 6th
- Location: Ismaning, Germany

Champions

Singles
- (United Kingdom) Anne Keothavong

Doubles
- (Netherlands) Kiki Bertens / (United Kingdom) Anne Keothavong
← 2010 ·	Büschl Open	· 2012 →

The 2011 Büschl Open was a professional tennis tournament played on carpet courts. It was the sixth edition of the tournament which was part of the 2011 ITF Women's Circuit. It took place in Ismaning, Germany between 31 October and 6 November 2011.

== WTA entrants ==
=== Seeds ===
Country	Player	Rank^{1}	Seed
SWE	Sofia Arvidsson	63	1
GER	Kristina Barrois	89	2
GBR	Anne Keothavong	91	3
CZE	Andrea Hlaváčková	101	4
AUT	Patricia Mayr-Achleitner	102	5
CZE	Eva Birnerová	106	6
~~NED~~	~~Michaëlla Krajicek~~	~~109~~	~~7~~
GER	Kathrin Wörle	140	8
CZE	Sandra Záhlavová	152	9

- ^{1} Rankings are as of October 24, 2011.
- Krajicek withdrew, therefore Záhlavová became the ninth seed.

=== Other entrants ===
The following players received wildcards into the singles main draw:

- (Germany) Annika Beck
- (Germany) Dinah Pfizenmaier
- (Germany) Christina Shakovets
- (Germany) Nina Zander

The following players received entry from the qualifying draw:

- (Russia) Daria Gavrilova
- (Germany) Vanessa Henke
- (Russia) Valeria Solovieva
- (Germany) Carina Witthöft

The following players received entry from a Lucky loser spot:

- (Germany) Kim Grajdek
- (Slovenia) Dalila Jakupovič

== Champions ==
=== Singles ===
(United Kingdom) Anne Keothavong def. (Austria) Yvonne Meusburger, 6–3, 1–6, 6–2

=== Doubles ===
(Netherlands) Kiki Bertens / (United Kingdom) Anne Keothavong def. (Germany) Kristina Barrois / (Austria) Yvonne Meusburger, 6–3, 6–3
