= 2012 Büschl Open – Singles =

Singles
- 2012 Büschl Open

Final
- Champion: (Germany) Annika Beck
- Runner-up: (Czech Republic) Eva Birnerová
- Score: 6–3, 7–6^{(10–8)}

Events
Singles	Doubles
← 2011 ·	Büschl Open	· 2013 →

Anne Keothavong was the defending champion, but lost to Anastasia Rodionova in the first round.

Annika Beck won the title, defeating Eva Birnerová in the final, 6–3, 7–6^{(10–8)}.

Barbora Záhlavová-Strýcová's results at the 2012 Büschl Open were annulled in February 2013 after the player had committed an anti-doping rule violation on a sample given on 16 October 2012 at the Luxembourg Open containing sibutramine.

== Seeds ==
1. (Serbia) Bojana Jovanovski (first round)
2. (Switzerland) Romina Oprandi (first round)
3. (Luxembourg) Mandy Minella (first round)
4. (United Kingdom) Anne Keothavong (first round)
5. (Czech Republic) ~~Barbora Záhlavová-Strýcová (second round)~~
6. (Ukraine) Lesia Tsurenko (quarterfinals)
7. (Slovakia) Jana Čepelová (first round)
8. (Kazakhstan) Ksenia Pervak (first round)

== Main draw ==
=== Key ===
- Q = Qualifier
- WC = Wild card
- LL = Lucky loser
- Alt = Alternate
- SE = Special exempt
- PR = Protected ranking
- ITF = ITF entry
- JE = Junior exempt
- w/o = Walkover
- r = Retired
- d = Defaulted
- SR = Special ranking

=== Finals ===
Semifinals
(Czech Republic) Eva Birnerová	6	6
(Czech Republic) Karolína Plíšková	4	4
WC	(Germany) Carina Witthöft	3	6^{3}
(Germany) Annika Beck	6	7^{7}

Final
(Czech Republic) Eva Birnerová	3	6^{8}
(Germany) Annika Beck	6	7^{10}

=== Top half ===
First round
1	(Serbia) B Jovanovski	1	5
(Czech Republic) E Birnerová	6	7
(United States) A Riske	1	6	3
(Ukraine) E Svitolina	6	3	6
(Germany) D Pfizenmaier	7	6
Q	(Ukraine) L Kichenok	5	2
(Austria) Y Meusburger	6	7^{9}
7	(Slovakia) J Čepelová	3	6^{7}
3	(Luxembourg) M Minella	6^{4}	4
(Czech Republic) Ka Plíšková	7^{7}	6
Q	(Switzerland) A Sadiković	6	6
Q	(Ukraine) N Kichenok	3	3
(United States) J Craybas	3	3
(Italy) K Knapp	6	6
(Ukraine) Y Beygelzimer	3	6	4
6	(Ukraine) L Tsurenko	6	1	6

Second round
(Czech Republic) E Birnerová	6	6^{5}	6
(Ukraine) E Svitolina	4	7^{7}	3
(Germany) D Pfizenmaier	2	2
(Austria) Y Meusburger	6	6
(Czech Republic) Ka Plíšková	6	6
Q	(Switzerland) A Sadiković	2	3
(Italy) K Knapp	4	4
6	(Ukraine) L Tsurenko	6	6

Quarterfinals
(Czech Republic) E Birnerová	3	6	6
(Austria) Y Meusburger	6	3	4
(Czech Republic) Ka Plíšková	6	6
6	(Ukraine) L Tsurenko	4	3

Semifinals
(Czech Republic) E Birnerová	6	6
(Czech Republic) Ka Plíšková	4	4

=== Bottom half ===
First round
5	(Czech Republic) ~~B Záhlavová-Strýcová~~	~~6~~	~~6~~
JE	(Russia) I Khromacheva	3	1
(Austria) P Mayr-Achleitner	5	0^{r}
WC	(Germany) C Witthöft	7	0
Q	(Czech Republic) S Záhlavová	1	2
WC	(Germany) A Zaja	6	6
(Australia) A Rodionova	7^{7}	6
4	(United Kingdom) A Keothavong	6^{3}	4
8	(Kazakhstan) K Pervak	7	1	6^{3}
(Germany) A Beck	5	6	7^{7}
WC	(Germany) A-L Friedsam	3	6	2
(Czech Republic) Kr Plíšková	6	2	6
(Italy) ME Camerin	6^{2}	2
WC	(Germany) A Lottner	7^{7}	6
(Greece) E Daniilidou	6	6
2	(Switzerland) R Oprandi	2	2

Second round
5	(Czech Republic) ~~B Záhlavová-Strýcová~~	~~3~~	~~4~~
WC	(Germany) C Witthöft	6	6
WC	(Germany) A Zaja	1	6^{5}
(Australia) A Rodionova	6	7^{7}
(Germany) A Beck	6	6
(Czech Republic) Kr Plíšková	4	4
WC	(Germany) A Lottner	3	7^{7}	3
(Greece) E Daniilidou	6	6^{4}	6

Quarterfinals
WC	(Germany) C Witthöft	6	6
(Australia) A Rodionova	3	4
(Germany) A Beck	6	4	7^{12}
(Greece) E Daniilidou	3	6	6^{10}

Semifinals
WC	(Germany) C Witthöft	3	6^{3}
(Germany) A Beck	6	7^{7}
