= 2014 French Open =

- Date: 25 May – 8 June 2014
- Edition: 113
- Category: 84th Grand Slam (ITF)
- Draw: 128S/64D/32X
- Prize money: €25,018,900
- Surface: Clay
- Location: Paris (XVI^{e}), France
- Venue: Stade Roland Garros

Champions

Men's singles
- (Spain) Rafael Nadal

Women's singles
- (Russia) Maria Sharapova

Men's doubles
- (France) Julien Benneteau / (France) Édouard Roger-Vasselin

Women's doubles
- (Chinese Taipei) Hsieh Su-wei / (China) Peng Shuai

Mixed doubles
- (Germany) Anna-Lena Grönefeld / (Netherlands) Jean-Julien Rojer

Wheelchair men's singles
- (Japan) Shingo Kunieda

Wheelchair women's singles
- (Japan) Yui Kamiji

Wheelchair men's doubles
- (Belgium) Joachim Gérard / (France) Stéphane Houdet

Wheelchair women's doubles
- (Japan) Yui Kamiji / (United Kingdom) Jordanne Whiley

Boys' singles
- (Russia) Andrey Rublev

Girls' singles
- (Russia) Daria Kasatkina

Boys' doubles
- (France) Benjamin Bonzi / (France) Quentin Halys

Girls' doubles
- (Romania) Ioana Ducu / (Romania) Ioana Loredana Roșca

Legends under 45 doubles
- (France) Mansour Bahrami / (France) Fabrice Santoro

Women's legends doubles
- (Belgium) Kim Clijsters / (United States) Martina Navratilova

Legends over 45 doubles
- (United States) John McEnroe / (United States) Patrick McEnroe
- French Open

The 2014 French Open was a tennis tournament played on outdoor clay courts. It was the 113th edition of the French Open and the second Grand Slam event of the year. It took place at the Stade Roland Garros from 25 May to 8 June. It consisted of events for professional players in singles, doubles and mixed doubles play. Junior and wheelchair players also took part in singles and doubles events.

Rafael Nadal was the four-time defending champion in the men's singles and defeated Novak Djokovic in the men's singles final to win his 9th French Open title and his 14th Grand Slam title. The victory made Nadal the first tennis player to have won 5 consecutive French Open titles, in addition to becoming the only man with at least one Grand Slam title in 10 consecutive years.

Serena Williams was the defending women's singles champion. Williams failed to defend her title, losing to Garbiñe Muguruza in the second round. Maria Sharapova won the women's singles, defeating Simona Halep to win her second French Open title and her 5th Grand Slam title.

This was first time that both singles winners of the Australian Open (Li Na and Stanislas Wawrinka) lost in the first round of the French Open. Also, for the first time at any Grand Slam event in the Open era, the top three women's seeds (Williams, Li, and Agnieszka Radwańska) all failed to reach the fourth round.

== Tournament ==
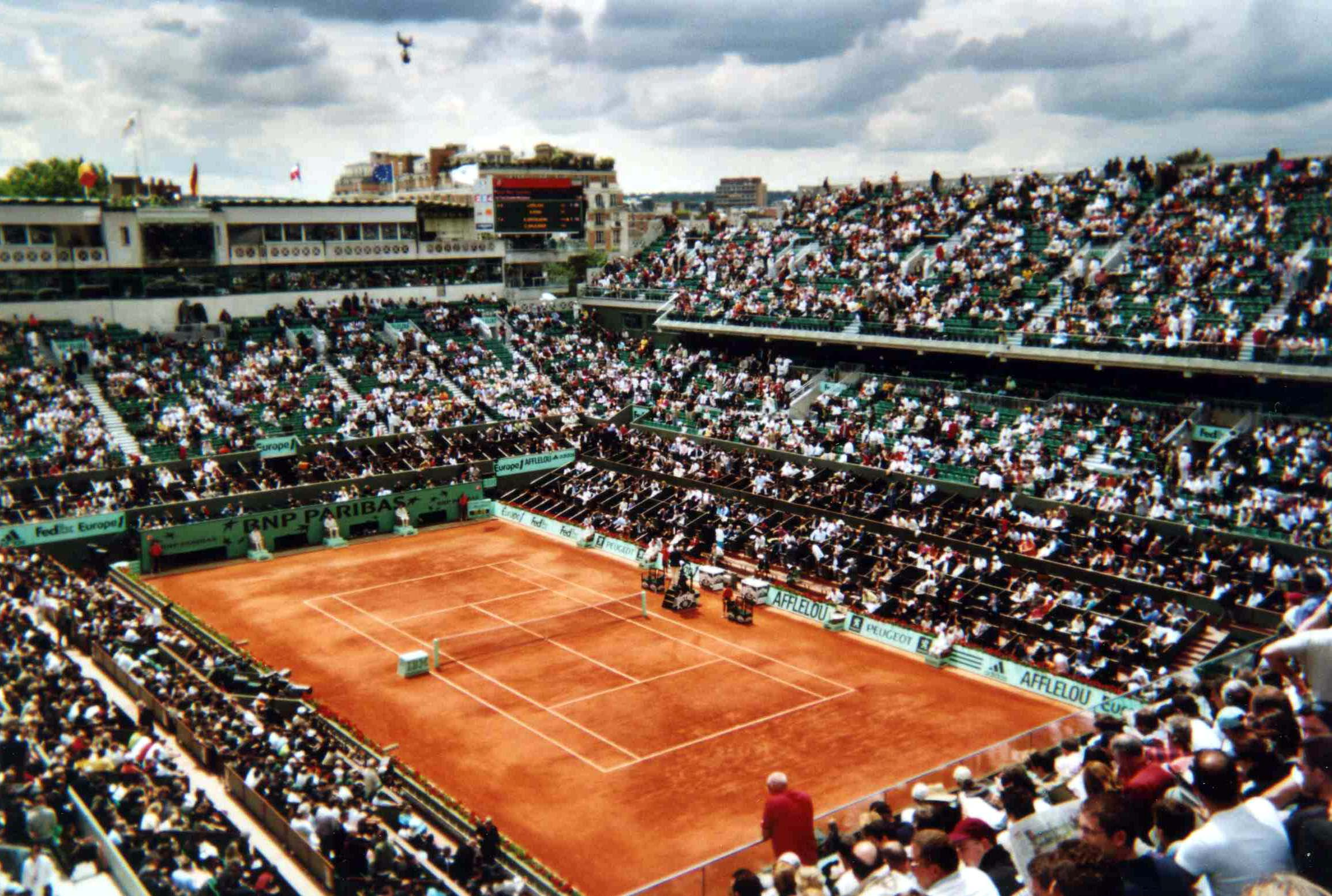
Court Philippe Chatrier where the finals of the French Open take place

The 2014 French Open was the 113th edition of the French Open and was held at Stade Roland Garros in Paris.

The tournament is an event run by the International Tennis Federation (ITF) and is part of the 2014 ATP World Tour and the 2014 WTA Tour calendars under the Grand Slam category. The tournament consists of both men's and women's singles and doubles draws as well as a mixed doubles event. There is a singles and doubles events for both boys and girls (players under 18), which is part of the Grade A category of tournaments, and singles and doubles events for men's and women's wheelchair tennis players as part of the NEC tour under the Grand Slam category. The tournament is taking place over a series of twenty clay courts, including the three main showcourts, Court Philippe Chatrier, Court Suzanne Lenglen and Court 1.

== Point and prize money distribution ==
=== Points distribution ===
Below is a series of tables for each of the competitions showing the ranking points on offer for each event.

==== Senior points ====
Event	W	F	SF	QF	Round of 16	Round of 32	Round of 64	Round of 128	Q	Q3	Q2	Q1
Men's singles	2000	1200	720	360	180	90	45	10	25	16	8	0
Men's doubles	2000	1200	720	360	180	90	0	—N/a	—N/a	—N/a	—N/a	—N/a
Women's singles	2000	1300	780	430	240	130	70	10	40	30	20	2
Women's doubles	2000	1300	780	430	240	130	10	—N/a	—N/a	—N/a	—N/a	—N/a

==== Wheelchair points ====
Event	W	F	SF/3rd	QF/4th
Singles	800	500	375	100
Doubles	800	500	100	—N/a
Quad singles	800	500	100	—N/a
Quad doubles	800	100	—N/a	—N/a

==== Junior points ====
Event	W	F	SF	QF	Round of 16	Round of 32	Q	Q3
Boys' singles	375	270	180	120	75	30	25	20
Girls' singles	375	270	180	120	75	30	25	20
Boys' doubles	270	180	120	75	45	—N/a	—N/a	—N/a
Girls' doubles	270	180	120	75	45	—N/a	—N/a	—N/a

=== Prize money ===
The total prize money for the tournament was €25,018,900, an increase of €3 million compared to the previous edition. The winners of the men's and women's singles title receive €1,650,000, an increase of 10% compared to 2013.

Event	W	F	SF	QF	Round of 16	Round of 32	Round of 64	Round of 128	Q3	Q2	Q1
Singles	€1,650,000	€825,000	€412,500	€220,000	€125,000	€72,000	€42,000	€24,000	€11,000	€5,500	€2,750
Doubles *	€400,000	€200,000	€100,000	€55,000	€31,000	€17,000	€8,500	—N/a	—N/a	—N/a	—N/a
Mixed doubles *	€110,000	€55,500	€27,750	€14,000	€7,500	€3,750	—N/a	—N/a	—N/a	—N/a	—N/a
Wheelchair singles	€22,000	€11,000	€6,000	€3,500	—N/a	—N/a	—N/a	—N/a	—N/a	—N/a	—N/a
Wheelchair doubles *	€7,000	€3,500	€2,100	—N/a	—N/a	—N/a	—N/a	—N/a	—N/a	—N/a	—N/a

_{* per team}

== Singles players ==
2014 French Open – Men's singles

Champion		Runner-up	
(Spain) Rafael Nadal [1]		(Serbia) Novak Djokovic [2]	
Semifinals out
(United Kingdom) Andy Murray [7]		(Latvia) Ernests Gulbis [18]	
Quarterfinals out
(Spain) David Ferrer [5]	(France) Gaël Monfils [23]	(Czech Republic) Tomáš Berdych [6]	(Canada) Milos Raonic [8]
4th round out
(Serbia) Dušan Lajović	(South Africa) Kevin Anderson [19]	(Spain) Guillermo García López	(Spain) Fernando Verdasco [24]
(United States) John Isner [10]	(Switzerland) Roger Federer [4]	(Spain) Marcel Granollers	(France) Jo-Wilfried Tsonga [13]
3rd round out
(Argentina) Leonardo Mayer	(United States) Jack Sock	(Croatia) Ivo Karlović	(Italy) Andreas Seppi [32]
(United States) Donald Young	(Italy) Fabio Fognini [14]	(France) Richard Gasquet [12]	(Germany) Philipp Kohlschreiber [28]
(Spain) Roberto Bautista Agut [27]	(Spain) Tommy Robredo [17]	(Czech Republic) Radek Štěpánek	(Russia) Dmitry Tursunov [31]
(France) Gilles Simon [29]	(Slovakia) Martin Kližan	(Poland) Jerzy Janowicz [22]	(Croatia) Marin Čilić [25]
2nd round out
(Austria) Dominic Thiem	(Russia) Teymuraz Gabashvili	(United States) Steve Johnson	(Estonia) Jürgen Zopp (PR)
(Austria) Andreas Haider-Maurer (Q)	(France) Axel Michon (Q)	(Argentina) Juan Mónaco	(Italy) Simone Bolelli (Q)
(France) Adrian Mannarino	(Spain) Feliciano López [26]	(Germany) Jan-Lennard Struff	(Brazil) Thomaz Bellucci
(Argentina) Carlos Berlocq	(Uruguay) Pablo Cuevas (PR)	(Uzbekistan) Denis Istomin	(Australia) Marinko Matosevic
(Kazakhstan) Aleksandr Nedovyesov	(France) Benoît Paire	(France) Kenny de Schepper	(Kazakhstan) Mikhail Kukushkin
(Russia) Mikhail Youzhny [15]	(Argentina) Facundo Bagnis (Q)	(United States) Sam Querrey	(Argentina) Diego Sebastián Schwartzman (Q)
(Czech Republic) Jiří Veselý	(Colombia) Alejandro González	(Ukraine) Alexandr Dolgopolov [20]	(Netherlands) Robin Haase
(Austria) Jürgen Melzer	(Finland) Jarkko Nieminen	(Germany) Tobias Kamke	(France) Jérémy Chardy
1st round out
(United States) Robby Ginepri (WC)	(France) Paul-Henri Mathieu (WC)	(Australia) James Duckworth (Q)	(Canada) Vasek Pospisil [30]
(Spain) Nicolás Almagro [21]	(France) Laurent Lokoli (Q)	(Argentina) Federico Delbonis	(Germany) Tommy Haas [16]
(Bulgaria) Grigor Dimitrov [11]	(Germany) Daniel Brands	(United States) Bradley Klahn	(France) Stéphane Robert
(Colombia) Santiago Giraldo	(France) Lucas Pouille (WC)	(Italy) Andrea Arnaboldi (Q)	(Netherlands) Igor Sijsling
(Switzerland) Stan Wawrinka [3]	(Chinese Taipei) Lu Yen-hsun	(Israel) Dudi Sela	(Bosnia and Herzegovina) Damir Džumhur (Q)
(Romania) Victor Hănescu	(France) Albano Olivetti (WC)	(Germany) Benjamin Becker	(Germany) Andreas Beck (Q)
(Australia) Bernard Tomic	(Australia) Lleyton Hewitt	(Australia) Matthew Ebden	(France) Michaël Llodra (WC)
(Spain) Pere Riba	(Ukraine) Sergiy Stakhovsky	(Germany) Dustin Brown	(Kazakhstan) Andrey Golubev
(Canada) Peter Polansky (Q)	(India) Somdev Devvarman	(Colombia) Alejandro Falla	(Italy) Paolo Lorenzi (Q)
(United Kingdom) James Ward (Q)	(Spain) Albert Montañés	(France) Nicolas Mahut	(France) Pierre-Hugues Herbert (WC)
(Spain) Pablo Carreño	(Argentina) Facundo Argüello	(France) Julien Benneteau	(Poland) Łukasz Kubot
(Italy) Potito Starace (Q)	(Italy) Filippo Volandri	(Portugal) Gastão Elias (Q)	(Slovakia) Lukáš Lacko
(Australia) Nick Kyrgios (WC)	(Czech Republic) Lukáš Rosol	(United States) Michael Russell	(Croatia) Ante Pavić (Q)
(Spain) Albert Ramos	(Croatia) Ivan Dodig	(Russia) Nikolay Davydenko	(Japan) Kei Nishikori [9]
(France) Édouard Roger-Vasselin	(Belgium) David Goffin	(Poland) Michał Przysiężny	(Dominican Republic) Víctor Estrella Burgos
(Spain) Pablo Andújar	(Slovakia) Miloslav Mečíř Jr. (Q)	(Spain) Daniel Gimeno Traver	(Portugal) João Sousa

2014 French Open – Women's singles

Champion		Runner-up	
(Russia) Maria Sharapova [7]		(Romania) Simona Halep [4]	
Semifinals out
(Canada) Eugenie Bouchard [18]		(Germany) Andrea Petkovic [28]	
Quarterfinals out
(Spain) Garbiñe Muguruza	(Spain) Carla Suárez Navarro [14]	(Russia) Svetlana Kuznetsova [27]	(Italy) Sara Errani [10]
4th round out
(France) Pauline Parmentier (WC)	(Australia) Samantha Stosur [19]	(Croatia) Alja Tomljanović	(Germany) Angelique Kerber [8]
(Czech Republic) Lucie Šafářová [23]	(United States) Sloane Stephens [15]	(Serbia) Jelena Janković [6]	(Netherlands) Kiki Bertens (Q)
3rd round out
(Slovakia) Anna Karolína Schmiedlová	(Germany) Mona Barthel	(Slovakia) Dominika Cibulková [9]	(Argentina) Paula Ormaechea
(Poland) Agnieszka Radwańska [3]	(United States) Taylor Townsend (WC)	(Sweden) Johanna Larsson	(Slovakia) Daniela Hantuchová [31]
(Czech Republic) Petra Kvitová [5]	(Serbia) Ana Ivanovic [11]	(Russia) Ekaterina Makarova [22]	(Spain) María Teresa Torró Flor
(Romania) Sorana Cîrstea [26]	(Israel) Julia Glushko	(Spain) Sílvia Soler Espinosa	(France) Kristina Mladenovic
2nd round out
(United States) Serena Williams [1]	(United States) Venus Williams [29]	(Kazakhstan) Yaroslava Shvedova	(Germany) Sabine Lisicki [16]
(Austria) Tamira Paszek (Q)	(Austria) Yvonne Meusburger	(Romania) Monica Niculescu	(Bulgaria) Tsvetana Pironkova
(Czech Republic) Karolína Plíšková	(Russia) Elena Vesnina [32]	(France) Alizé Cornet [29]	(Switzerland) Timea Bacsinszky (Q)
(Italy) Flavia Pennetta [12]	(Germany) Julia Görges	(France) Claire Feuerstein (WC)	(United States) Varvara Lepchenko
(New Zealand) Marina Erakovic	(Italy) Camila Giorgi	(Australia) Casey Dellacqua	(Ukraine) Elina Svitolina
(Slovenia) Polona Hercog	(United States) CoCo Vandeweghe	(Slovakia) Magdaléna Rybáriková	(United Kingdom) Heather Watson (Q)
(Japan) Kurumi Nara	(Brazil) Teliana Pereira	(Belgium) Kirsten Flipkens [21]	(Germany) Dinah Pfizenmaier
(Belgium) Yanina Wickmayer	(Russia) Anastasia Pavlyuchenkova [24]	(Switzerland) Stefanie Vögele	(United States) Alison Riske
1st round out
(France) Alizé Lim (WC)	(United States) Grace Min (Q)	(China) Zheng Jie	(Switzerland) Belinda Bencic
(Italy) Roberta Vinci [17]	(United States) Lauren Davis	(Italy) Karin Knapp	(France) Fiona Ferro (WC)
(France) Virginie Razzano	(Belgium) Alison Van Uytvanck	(France) Amandine Hesse (WC)	(Puerto Rico) Monica Puig
(Estonia) Kaia Kanepi [25]	(Switzerland) Romina Oprandi	(Germany) Annika Beck	(Russia) Ksenia Pervak (Q)
(China) Zhang Shuai	(France) Mathilde Johansson (WC)	(Italy) Francesca Schiavone	(United States) Christina McHale
(Australia) Ashleigh Barty (WC)	(United States) Vania King	(Ukraine) Maryna Zanevska (Q)	(Ukraine) Yuliya Beygelzimer (Q)
(Austria) Patricia Mayr-Achleitner	(Russia) Maria Kirilenko	(Portugal) Michelle Larcher de Brito (Q)	(Israel) Shahar Pe'er
(Serbia) Jovana Jakšić	(Belarus) Olga Govortsova	(Czech Republic) Petra Cetkovská	(Poland) Katarzyna Piter
(Kazakhstan) Zarina Diyas	(Ukraine) Nadiia Kichenok	(Serbia) Bojana Jovanovski	(Georgia (country)) Sofia Shapatava (Q)
(Luxembourg) Mandy Minella	(Spain) Lourdes Domínguez Lino	(Croatia) Petra Martić	(France) Caroline Garcia
(China) Peng Shuai	(Slovakia) Jana Čepelová	(Czech Republic) Iveta Melzer (PR)	(United States) Shelby Rogers
(Czech Republic) Klára Koukalová [30]	(Poland) Urszula Radwańska	(Czech Republic) Barbora Záhlavová-Strýcová	(Russia) Alisa Kleybanova
(Canada) Sharon Fichman	(United States) Anna Tatishvili	(Thailand) Luksika Kumkhum	(Canada) Aleksandra Wozniak (Q)
(Montenegro) Danka Kovinić (Q)	(Croatia) Donna Vekić	(Spain) Estrella Cabeza Candela	(United States) Madison Keys
(Denmark) Caroline Wozniacki [13]	(South Africa) Chanelle Scheepers	(Romania) Alexandra Cadanțu	(Japan) Kimiko Date-Krumm
(Japan) Misaki Doi	(Germany) Anna-Lena Friedsam	(Croatia) Mirjana Lučić-Baroni	(China) Li Na [2]

== Singles seeds ==
The following are the seeded players and notable players who withdrew from the event. Seedings and Rankings are based on ATP and WTA rankings as of 19 May 2014, while points before are as of the standings on 26 May 2014.

=== Men's singles ===
Seed	Rank	Player	Points before	Points defending	Points won	Points after	Status
1	1	(Spain) Rafael Nadal	12,500	2,000	2,000	12,500	Champion, defeated (Serbia) Novak Djokovic [2]
2	2	(Serbia) Novak Djokovic	11,850	720	1,200	12,330	Runner-up, lost to (Spain) Rafael Nadal [1]
3	3	(Switzerland) Stan Wawrinka	5,830	360	10	5,480	First round lost to (Spain) Guillermo García López
4	4	(Switzerland) Roger Federer	5,125	360	180	4,945	Fourth round lost to (Latvia) Ernests Gulbis [18]
5	5	(Spain) David Ferrer	5,030	1,200	360	4,190	Quarterfinals lost to (Spain) Rafael Nadal [1]
6	6	(Czech Republic) Tomáš Berdych	4,330	10	360	4,680	Quarterfinals lost to (Latvia) Ernests Gulbis [18]
7	8	(United Kingdom) Andy Murray	4,120	0	720	4,840	Semifinals lost to (Spain) Rafael Nadal [1]
8	9	(Canada) Milos Raonic	2,975	90	360	3,245	Quarterfinals lost to (Serbia) Novak Djokovic [2]
9	10	(Japan) Kei Nishikori	2,815	180	10	2,645	First round lost to (Slovakia) Martin Kližan
10	11	(United States) John Isner	2,600	90	180	2,690	Fourth round lost to (Czech Republic) Tomáš Berdych [6]
11	12	(Bulgaria) Grigor Dimitrov	2,515	90	10	2,435	First round lost to (Croatia) Ivo Karlović
12	13	(France) Richard Gasquet	2,445	180	90	2,355	Third round lost to (Spain) Fernando Verdasco [24]
13	14	(France) Jo-Wilfried Tsonga	2,315	720	180	1,775	Fourth round lost to (Serbia) Novak Djokovic [2]
14	15	(Italy) Fabio Fognini	2,155	90	90	2,155	Third round lost to (France) Gaël Monfils [23]
15	16	(Russia) Mikhail Youzhny	2,065	180	45	1,930	Second round lost to (Czech Republic) Radek Štěpánek
16	18	(Germany) Tommy Haas	2,005	360	10	1,655	First round retired against (Estonia) Jürgen Zopp [PR]
17	19	(Spain) Tommy Robredo	1,900	360	90	1,630	Third round lost to (United States) John Isner [10]
18	17	(Latvia) Ernests Gulbis	2,050	45	720	2,725	Semifinals lost to (Serbia) Novak Djokovic [2]
19	20	(South Africa) Kevin Anderson	1,710	180	180	1,710	Fourth round lost to (Spain) David Ferrer [5]
20	21	(Ukraine) Alexandr Dolgopolov	1,645	10	45	1,680	Second round lost to (Spain) Marcel Granollers
21	22	(Spain) Nicolás Almagro	1,620	180	10	1,450	First round retired against (United States) Jack Sock
22	23	(Poland) Jerzy Janowicz	1,510	90	90	1,510	Third round lost to (France) Jo-Wilfried Tsonga [13]
23	28	(France) Gaël Monfils	1,390	90	360	1,660	Quarterfinals lost to (United Kingdom) Andy Murray [7]
24	25	(Spain) Fernando Verdasco	1,420	45	180	1,555	Fourth round lost to (United Kingdom) Andy Murray [7]
25	26	(Croatia) Marin Čilić	1,410	90	90	1,410	Third round lost to (Serbia) Novak Djokovic [2]
26	27	(Spain) Feliciano López	1,395	90	45	1,350	Second round lost to (United States) Donald Young
27	29	(Spain) Roberto Bautista Agut	1,330	45	90	1,375	Third round lost to (Czech Republic) Tomáš Berdych [6]
28	24	(Germany) Philipp Kohlschreiber	1,485	180	90	1,395	Third round lost to (United Kingdom) Andy Murray [7]
29	30	(France) Gilles Simon	1,225	180	90	1,135	Third round lost to (Canada) Milos Raonic [8]
30	31	(Canada) Vasek Pospisil	1,170	35	10	1,145	First round lost to (Russia) Teymuraz Gabashvili
31	32	(Russia) Dmitry Tursunov	1,155	45	90	1,200	Third round lost to (Switzerland) Roger Federer [4]
32	33	(Italy) Andreas Seppi	1,150	90	90	1,150	Third round lost to (Spain) David Ferrer [5]

The following player would have been seeded, but he withdrew from the event.

Rank	Player	Points before	Points defending	Points after	Withdrawal reason
7	(Argentina) Juan Martín del Potro	4,125	0	4,125	Wrist injury

=== Women's singles ===
Seed	Rank	Player	Points before	Points defending	Points won	Points after	Status
1	1	(United States) Serena Williams	11,590	2,000	70	9,660	Second round lost to (Spain) Garbiñe Muguruza
2	2	(China) Li Na	7,540	100	10	7,450	First round lost to (France) Kristina Mladenovic
3	3	(Poland) Agnieszka Radwańska	6,360	500	130	5,990	Third round lost to (Croatia) Ajla Tomljanović
4	4	(Romania) Simona Halep	5,140	5	1,300	6,435	Runner-up, lost to (Russia) Maria Sharapova [7]
5	6	(Czech Republic) Petra Kvitová	4,600	160	130	4,570	Third round lost to (Russia) Svetlana Kuznetsova [27]
6	7	(Serbia) Jelena Janković	4,225	500	240	3,965	Fourth round lost to (Italy) Sara Errani [10]
7	8	(Russia) Maria Sharapova	4,141	1,400	2,000	4,741	Champion, defeated (Romania) Simona Halep [4]
8	9	(Germany) Angelique Kerber	3,870	280	240	3,830	Fourth round lost to (Canada) Eugenie Bouchard [18]
9	10	(Slovakia) Dominika Cibulková	3,705	100	130	3,735	Third round lost to (Australia) Samantha Stosur [19]
10	11	(Italy) Sara Errani	3,590	900	430	3,120	Quarterfinals lost to (Germany) Andrea Petkovic [28]
11	12	(Serbia) Ana Ivanovic	3,455	280	130	3,305	Third round lost to (Czech Republic) Lucie Šafářová [23]
12	13	(Italy) Flavia Pennetta	3,259	5	70	3,324	Second round lost to (Sweden) Johanna Larsson
13	14	(Denmark) Caroline Wozniacki	2,790	100	10	2,700	First round lost to (Belgium) Yanina Wickmayer
14	15	(Spain) Carla Suárez Navarro	2,785	280	430	2,935	Quarterfinals lost to (Canada) Eugenie Bouchard [18]
15	16	(United States) Sloane Stephens	2,481	280	240	2,441	Fourth round lost to (Romania) Simona Halep [4]
16	17	(Germany) Sabine Lisicki	2,556	160	70	2,466	Second round retired vs (Germany) Mona Barthel
17	18	(Italy) Roberta Vinci	2,420	280	10	2,150	First round lost to (France) Pauline Parmentier [WC]
18	19	(Canada) Eugenie Bouchard	2,640	100	780	3,320	Semifinals lost to (Russia) Maria Sharapova [7]
19	20	(Australia) Samantha Stosur	2,485	160	240	2,565	Fourth round lost to (Russia) Maria Sharapova [7]
20	21	(France) Alizé Cornet	2,085	160	70	1,995	Second round lost to (United States) Taylor Townsend [WC]
21	22	(Belgium) Kirsten Flipkens	2,010	100	70	1,980	Second round lost to (Israel) Julia Glushko
22	23	(Russia) Ekaterina Makarova	2,005	5	130	2,130	Third round lost to (United States) Sloane Stephens [15]
23	24	(Czech Republic) Lucie Šafářová	1,950	5	240	2,295	Fourth round lost to (Russia) Svetlana Kuznetsova [27]
24	25	(Russia) Anastasia Pavlyuchenkova	1,915	100	70	1,885	Second round retired vs (Netherlands) Kiki Bertens [Q]
25	26	(Estonia) Kaia Kanepi	1,312	100	10	1,222	First round lost to (Romania) Monica Niculescu
26	27	(Romania) Sorana Cîrstea	1,710	160	130	1,680	Third round lost to (Serbia) Jelena Janković [6]
27	28	(Russia) Svetlana Kuznetsova	1,706	500	430	1,636	Quarterfinals lost to (Romania) Simona Halep [4]
28	29	(Germany) Andrea Petkovic	1,710	(140)^{†}	780	2,350	Semifinals lost to (Romania) Simona Halep [4]
29	30	(United States) Venus Williams	1,531	5	70	1,596	Second round lost to (Slovakia) Anna Karolína Schmiedlová
30	31	(Czech Republic) Klára Koukalová	1,490	5	10	1,495	First round lost to (Spain) María Teresa Torró Flor
31	32	(Slovakia) Daniela Hantuchová	1,461	5	130	1,586	Third round lost to (Germany) Angelique Kerber [8]
32	33	(Russia) Elena Vesnina	1,455	5	70	1,520	Second round lost to (Croatia) Ajla Tomljanović

†The player did not qualify for the tournament in 2013. Accordingly, this was the 16th best result deducted instead.

The following player would have been seeded, but she withdrew from the event.

Rank	Player	Points before	Points defending	Points after	Withdrawal reason
5	(Belarus) Victoria Azarenka	4,741	900	3,841	Foot injury

== Main draw wildcard entries ==
The following players have been given a wildcard to the main draw based on internal selection and recent performances.

Men's singles

- (United States) Robby Ginepri
- (France) Pierre-Hugues Herbert
- (Australia) Nick Kyrgios
- (France) Michaël Llodra
- (France) Paul-Henri Mathieu
- (France) Axel Michon
- (France) Albano Olivetti
- (France) Lucas Pouille

Women's singles

- (Australia) Ashleigh Barty
- (France) Fiona Ferro
- (France) Claire Feuerstein
- (France) Amandine Hesse
- (France) Mathilde Johansson
- (France) Alizé Lim
- (France) Pauline Parmentier
- (United States) Taylor Townsend

Men's doubles

- (France) Mathias Bourgue / (France) Paul-Henri Mathieu
- (France) Jonathan Eysseric / (France) Marc Gicquel
- (France) Pierre-Hugues Herbert / (France) Albano Olivetti
- (France) Tristan Lamasine / (France) Laurent Lokoli
- (France) Fabrice Martin / (France) Hugo Nys
- (France) Gaël Monfils / (France) Josselin Ouanna
- (France) Florent Serra / (France) Maxime Teixeira

Women's doubles

- (Germany) Mona Barthel / (France) Virginie Razzano
- (France) Julie Coin / (France) Pauline Parmentier
- (France) Alix Collombon / (France) Chloé Paquet
- (France) Claire Feuerstein / (France) Alizé Lim
- (France) Stéphanie Foretz Gacon / (France) Laura Thorpe
- (France) Amandine Hesse / (France) Mathilde Johansson
- (France) Irina Ramialison / (France) Constance Sibille

Mixed doubles

- (France) Julie Coin / (France) Nicolas Mahut
- (France) Alizé Cornet / (France) Jonathan Eysseric
- (France) Stéphanie Foretz Gacon / (France) Édouard Roger-Vasselin
- (France) Amandine Hesse / (France) Michaël Llodra
- (France) Mathilde Johansson / (France) Adrian Mannarino
- (France) Alizé Lim / (France) Jérémy Chardy

== Main draw qualifiers ==
=== Men's singles ===
1. (Italy) Paolo Lorenzi
2. (Canada) Peter Polansky
3. (France) Laurent Lokoli
4. (United Kingdom) James Ward
5. (Croatia) Ante Pavić
6. (Austria) Andreas Haider-Maurer
7. (Slovakia) Miloslav Mečíř Jr.
8. (Argentina) Diego Schwartzman
9. (Italy) Simone Bolelli
10. (Bosnia and Herzegovina) Damir Džumhur
11. (Argentina) Facundo Bagnis
12. (Portugal) Gastão Elias
13. (Germany) Andreas Beck
14. (Italy) Andrea Arnaboldi
15. (Australia) James Duckworth
16. (Italy) Potito Starace

=== Women's singles ===
1. (United States) Grace Min
2. (United Kingdom) Heather Watson
3. (Ukraine) Maryna Zanevska
4. (Ukraine) Yuliya Beygelzimer
5. (Montenegro) Danka Kovinić
6. (Canada) Aleksandra Wozniak
7. (Netherlands) Kiki Bertens
8. (Russia) Ksenia Pervak
9. (Switzerland) Timea Bacsinszky
10. (Georgia (country)) Sofia Shapatava
11. (Portugal) Michelle Larcher de Brito
12. (Austria) Tamira Paszek

== Protected ranking ==
The following players were accepted directly into the main draw using a protected ranking:

Men's singles

- (Uruguay) Pablo Cuevas (PR 54)
- (Estonia) Jürgen Zopp (PR 88)

Women's singles

- (Czech Republic) Iveta Melzer (PR 67)

== Withdrawals ==
The following players were accepted directly into the main tournament, but withdrew with injuries.

Men's singles

- (Argentina) Juan Martín del Potro → replaced by (Argentina) Facundo Argüello
- (Germany) Florian Mayer → replaced by (Brazil) Thomaz Bellucci
- (Serbia) Janko Tipsarević → replaced by (Belgium) David Goffin

Women's singles

- (Belarus) Victoria Azarenka → replaced by (Germany) Anna-Lena Friedsam
- (United States) Jamie Hampton → replaced by (Croatia) Petra Martić
- (United States) Bethanie Mattek-Sands → replaced by (Luxembourg) Mandy Minella
- (United Kingdom) Laura Robson → replaced by (United States) Shelby Rogers
- (Kazakhstan) Galina Voskoboeva → replaced by (Spain) Estrella Cabeza Candela

== Champions ==
=== Seniors ===
==== Men's singles ====
- (Spain) Rafael Nadal defeated (Serbia) Novak Djokovic, 3–6, 7–5, 6–2, 6–4

• It was Nadal's 14th career Grand Slam title and his 9th title at the French Open (a record). He is on his sixty-fourth career title overall.

==== Women's singles ====
- (Russia) Maria Sharapova defeated (Romania) Simona Halep, 6–4, 6–7^{(5–7)}, 6–4

• It was Sharapova's 5th career Grand Slam title and her 2nd title at the French Open.

==== Men's doubles ====
- (France) Julien Benneteau / (France) Édouard Roger-Vasselin defeated (Spain) Marcel Granollers / (Spain) Marc López, 6–3, 7–6^{(7–1)}

• It was Benneteau's 1st career Grand Slam doubles title.
• It was Vasselin's 1st career Grand Slam doubles title.

==== Women's doubles ====
- (Chinese Taipei) Hsieh Su-wei / (China) Peng Shuai defeated (Italy) Sara Errani / (Italy) Roberta Vinci, 6–4, 6–1

• It was Hsieh's 2nd career Grand Slam doubles title and her 1st title at the French Open.
• It was Peng's 2nd career Grand Slam doubles title and her 1st title at the French Open.

==== Mixed doubles ====
- (Germany) Anna-Lena Grönefeld / (Netherlands) Jean-Julien Rojer defeated (Germany) Julia Görges / (Serbia) Nenad Zimonjić, 4–6, 6–2, [10–7]

• It was Grönefeld's 2nd career Grand Slam mixed doubles title and her 1st title at the French Open.
• It was Rojer's 1st career Grand Slam mixed doubles title.

=== Juniors ===
==== Boys' singles ====
- (Russia) Andrey Rublev defeated (Spain) Jaume Antoni Munar Clar, 6–2, 7–5

==== Girls' singles ====
- (Russia) Daria Kasatkina defeated (Serbia) Ivana Jorović, 6–7^{(5–7)}, 6–2, 6–3

==== Boys' doubles ====
- (France) Benjamin Bonzi / (France) Quentin Halys defeated (Austria) Lucas Miedler / (Australia) Akira Santillan, 6–3, 6–3

==== Girls' doubles ====
- (Romania) Ioana Ducu / (Romania) Ioana Loredana Roșca defeated (United States) CiCi Bellis / (Czech Republic) Markéta Vondroušová, 6–1, 5–7, [11–9]

=== Wheelchair events ===
==== Wheelchair men's singles ====
- (Japan) Shingo Kunieda defeated (France) Stéphane Houdet, 6–4, 6–1

==== Wheelchair women's singles ====
- (Japan) Yui Kamiji defeated (Netherlands) Aniek van Koot, 7–6^{(9–7)}, 6–4

==== Wheelchair men's doubles ====
- (Belgium) Joachim Gérard / (France) Stéphane Houdet defeated (Argentina) Gustavo Fernández / (France) Nicolas Peifer, 4–6, 6–3, [11–9]

==== Wheelchair women's doubles ====
- (Japan) Yui Kamiji / (United Kingdom) Jordanne Whiley defeated (Netherlands) Jiske Griffioen / (Netherlands) Aniek van Koot, 7–6^{(7–3)}, 3–6, [10–8]

=== Other events ===
==== Legends under 45 doubles ====
- (France) Mansour Bahrami / (France) Fabrice Santoro defeated (France) Arnaud Clément / (France) Nicolas Escudé, 6–2, 2–6, [11–9]

==== Legends over 45 doubles ====
- (United States) John McEnroe / (United States) Patrick McEnroe defeated (Ecuador) Andrés Gómez / (Australia) Mark Woodforde, 4–6, 7–5, [10–7]

==== Women's legends doubles ====
- (Belgium) Kim Clijsters / (United States) Martina Navratilova defeated (France) Nathalie Dechy / (France) Sandrine Testud, 5–7, 7–5, [10–7]

Preceded by 2014 Australian Open	Grand Slam Tournaments	Succeeded by 2014 Wimbledon Championships
