= 2012 Büschl Open =

Tennis tournament

- Date: 22–28 October
- Edition: 7th
- Location: Ismaning, Germany

Champions

Singles
- (Germany) Annika Beck

Doubles
- (Switzerland) Romina Oprandi / (Switzerland) Amra Sadiković
← 2011 ·	Büschl Open	· 2013 →

The 2012 Büschl Open was a professional tennis tournament played on indoor carpet courts. It was the seventh edition of the tournament which was part of the 2012 ITF Women's Circuit. It took place in Ismaning, Germany on 22–28 October 2012.

== WTA entrants ==
=== Seeds ===
Country	Player	Rank^{1}	Seed
SRB	Bojana Jovanovski	55	1
SUI	Romina Oprandi	59	2
LUX	Mandy Minella	79	3
GBR	Anne Keothavong	83	4
CZE	Barbora Záhlavová-Strýcová	92	5
UKR	Lesia Tsurenko	103	6
SVK	Jana Čepelová	104	7
KAZ	Ksenia Pervak	106	8

- ^{1} Rankings are as of 15 October 2012.

=== Other entrants ===
The following players received wildcards into the singles main draw:

- (Germany) Anna-Lena Friedsam
- (Germany) Antonia Lottner
- (Germany) Carina Witthöft
- (Germany) Anna Zaja

The following players received entry from the qualifying draw:

- (Czech Republic) Sandra Záhlavová
- (Ukraine) Lyudmyla Kichenok
- (Ukraine) Nadiia Kichenok
- (Switzerland) Amra Sadiković

The following player received entry by a Junior Exempt:

- (Russia) Irina Khromacheva

== Champions ==
=== Singles ===
- (Germany) Annika Beck def. (Czech Republic) Eva Birnerová, 6–3, 7–6^{(10–8)}

=== Doubles ===
- (Switzerland) Romina Oprandi / (Switzerland) Amra Sadiković def. (United States) Jill Craybas / (Czech Republic) Eva Hrdinová, 4–6, 6–3, [10–7]
