= 2014 French Open – Men's singles =

Men's singles
- 2014 French Open

Final
- Champion: (Spain) Rafael Nadal
- Runner-up: (Serbia) Novak Djokovic
- Score: 3–6, 7–5, 6–2, 6–4

Events
Singles	men	women		boys	girls
Doubles	men	women	mixed	boys	girls
WC Singles	men	women	quad
WC Doubles	men	women	quad
Legends	−45	45+	women
- French Open

Four-time defending champion Rafael Nadal defeated Novak Djokovic in the final, 3–6, 7–5, 6–2, 6–4 to win the men's singles tennis title at the 2014 French Open. It was his record-extending ninth French Open title and 14th major title overall, tying Pete Sampras in second place for the most men's singles major titles. Nadal took his French Open win-loss record to 66–1, and became the first man in the Open Era to win nine titles at a single tournament (surpassing Guillermo Vilas's record of eight titles at the Argentina Open). Nadal was the first man to win nine titles at the same major and the first man to win the French Open five consecutive times.

Roger Federer was trying to become the first man in the Open Era to achieve a double career Grand Slam, but he lost to Ernests Gulbis in the fourth round. This marked Federer's first loss prior to the quarterfinals at the French Open since 2004.

Nadal and Djokovic were in contention for the world No. 1 ranking. Nadal retained the top position by defeating Djokovic in the final. This was the sixth time the duo met at the French Open, with Nadal claiming all six wins.

This marked the final major appearance of former world No. 3 and Tour Finals champion Nikolay Davydenko.

== Seeds ==
1. (Spain) Rafael Nadal (champion)
2. (Serbia) Novak Djokovic (final)
3. (Switzerland) Stan Wawrinka (first round)
4. (Switzerland) Roger Federer (fourth round)
5. (Spain) David Ferrer (quarterfinals)
6. (Czech Republic) Tomáš Berdych (quarterfinals)
7. (United Kingdom) Andy Murray (semifinals)
8. (Canada) Milos Raonic (quarterfinals)
9. (Japan) Kei Nishikori (first round)
10. (United States) John Isner (fourth round)
11. (Bulgaria) Grigor Dimitrov (first round)
12. (France) Richard Gasquet (third round)
13. (France) Jo-Wilfried Tsonga (fourth round)
14. (Italy) Fabio Fognini (third round)
15. (Russia) Mikhail Youzhny (second round)
16. (Germany) Tommy Haas (first round, retired because of a right shoulder injury)

17. (Spain) Tommy Robredo (third round)
18. (Latvia) Ernests Gulbis (semifinals)
19. (South Africa) Kevin Anderson (fourth round)
20. (Ukraine) Alexandr Dolgopolov (second round)
21. (Spain) Nicolás Almagro (first round, retired because of a left foot injury)
22. (Poland) Jerzy Janowicz (third round)
23. (France) Gaël Monfils (quarterfinals)
24. (Spain) Fernando Verdasco (fourth round)
25. (Croatia) Marin Čilić (third round)
26. (Spain) Feliciano López (second round)
27. (Spain) Roberto Bautista Agut (third round)
28. (Germany) Philipp Kohlschreiber (third round)
29. (France) Gilles Simon (third round)
30. (Canada) Vasek Pospisil (first round)
31. (Russia) Dmitry Tursunov (third round)
32. (Italy) Andreas Seppi (third round)

== Draw ==
Key

- Q = Qualifier
- WC = Wild card
- LL = Lucky loser
- Alt = Alternate
- ITF = ITF entry
- PR = Protected ranking
- SR = Special ranking
- SE = Special exempt
- JE = Junior exempt
- JR = Junior Accelerator Programme entrant
- CO = College Accelerator Programme entrant
- NG = Next Gen Accelerator Program entrant
- w/o = Walkover
- r = Retired
- d = Defaulted

=== Finals ===
Quarterfinals
1	(Spain) Rafael Nadal	4	6	6	6
5	(Spain) David Ferrer	6	4	0	1
23	(France) Gaël Monfils	4	1	6	6	0
7	(United Kingdom) Andy Murray	6	6	4	1	6
6	(Czech Republic) Tomáš Berdych	3	2	4
18	(Latvia) Ernests Gulbis	6	6	6
8	(Canada) Milos Raonic	5	6^{5}	4
2	(Serbia) Novak Djokovic	7	7^{7}	6

Semifinals
1	(Spain) Rafael Nadal	6	6	6
7	(United Kingdom) Andy Murray	3	2	1
18	(Latvia) Ernests Gulbis	3	3	6	3
2	(Serbia) Novak Djokovic	6	6	3	6

Final
1	(Spain) Rafael Nadal	3	7	6	6
2	(Serbia) Novak Djokovic	6	5	2	4

=== Top half ===
==== Section 1 ====
First round
1	(Spain) R Nadal	6	6	6
WC	(United States) R Ginepri	0	3	0
WC	(France) P-H Mathieu	4	6^{3}	2
(Austria) D Thiem	6	7^{7}	6
Q	(Australia) J Duckworth	7	2	4	6^{2}
(Argentina) L Mayer	5	6	6	7^{7}
(Russia) T Gabashvili	6	6	6
30	(Canada) V Pospisil	4	2	3
21	(Spain) N Almagro	0^{r}
(United States) J Sock	5
(United States) S Johnson	4	6^{7}	7^{7}	6	6
Q	(France) L Lokoli	6	7^{9}	6^{3}	3	3
(Serbia) D Lajović	6	6	6
(Argentina) F Delbonis	3	2	3
PR	(Estonia) J Zopp	2
16	(Germany) T Haas	5^{r}

Second round
1	(Spain) R Nadal	6	6	6
(Austria) D Thiem	2	2	3
(Argentina) L Mayer	6	4	6	6
(Russia) T Gabashvili	2	6	4	4
(United States) J Sock	7	6	6
(United States) S Johnson	5	4	2
(Serbia) D Lajović	6	6	6
PR	(Estonia) J Zopp	2	4	4

Third round
1	(Spain) R Nadal	6	7	6
(Argentina) L Mayer	2	5	2
(United States) J Sock	4	5	3
(Serbia) D Lajović	6	7	6

Fourth round
1	(Spain) R Nadal	6	6	6
(Serbia) D Lajović	1	2	1

==== Section 2 ====
First round
11	(Bulgaria) G Dimitrov	4	5	6^{4}
(Croatia) I Karlović	6	7	7^{7}
Q	(Austria) A Haider-Maurer	4	4	6	6	6
(Germany) D Brands	6	6	2	3	4
WC	(France) A Michon	6	6^{4}	5	6	6
(United States) B Klahn	1	7^{7}	7	1	4
(France) S Robert	5	3	4
19	(South Africa) K Anderson	7	6	6
32	(Italy) A Seppi	6	7	6
(Colombia) S Giraldo	3	5	3
(Argentina) J Mónaco	6	6	6
WC	(France) L Pouille	3	1	4
Q	(Italy) S Bolelli	6	6	6
Q	(Italy) A Arnaboldi	4	4	2
(Netherlands) I Sijsling	4	3	1
5	(Spain) D Ferrer	6	6	6

Second round
(Croatia) I Karlović	7	6	6
Q	(Austria) A Haider-Maurer	5	3	4
WC	(France) A Michon	2	3	2
19	(South Africa) K Anderson	6	6	6
32	(Italy) A Seppi	6	6	6
(Argentina) J Mónaco	2	4	4
Q	(Italy) S Bolelli	2	3	2
5	(Spain) D Ferrer	6	6	6

Third round
(Croatia) I Karlović	3	0^{r}
19	(South Africa) K Anderson	6	0
32	(Italy) A Seppi	2	6^{2}	3
5	(Spain) D Ferrer	6	7^{7}	6

Fourth round
19	(South Africa) K Anderson	3	3	7^{7}	1
5	(Spain) D Ferrer	6	6	6^{5}	6

==== Section 3 ====
First round
3	(Switzerland) S Wawrinka	4	7	2	0
(Spain) G García-López	6	5	6	6
(France) A Mannarino	6	6	6
(Chinese Taipei) Y-h Lu	2	1	1
(United States) D Young	6	2	6	6
(Israel) D Sela	1	6	1	0
Q	(Bosnia and Herzegovina) D Džumhur	3	6^{8}	3
26	(Spain) F López	6	7^{10}	6
23	(France) G Monfils	6	4	6	6
(Romania) V Hănescu	2	6	4	2
WC	(France) A Olivetti	1	4	4
(Germany) J-L Struff	6	6	6
(Germany) B Becker	2	4	6	6	2
(Brazil) T Bellucci	6	6	3	4	6
Q	(Germany) A Beck	4	4	1
14	(Italy) F Fognini	6	6	6

Second round
(Spain) G García-López	6	6	4	6
(France) A Mannarino	4	3	6	0
(United States) D Young	6	7^{7}	6
26	(Spain) F López	3	6^{1}	3
23	(France) G Monfils	7^{7}	6	6
(Germany) J-L Struff	6^{4}	4	1
(Brazil) T Bellucci	3	4	6^{2}
14	(Italy) F Fognini	6	6	7^{7}

Third round
(Spain) G García-López	6	6	2	6^{4}	6
(United States) D Young	2	4	6	7^{7}	4
23	(France) G Monfils	5	6	6	0	6
14	(Italy) F Fognini	7	2	4	6	2

Fourth round
(Spain) G García-López	0	2	5
23	(France) G Monfils	6	6	7

==== Section 4 ====
First round
12	(France) R Gasquet	6	6	7
(Australia) B Tomic	2	1	5
(Australia) L Hewitt	6	2	1	4
(Argentina) C Berlocq	3	6	6	6
(Australia) M Ebden	1	2	3
PR	(Uruguay) P Cuevas	6	6	6
WC	(France) M Llodra	2	6^{4}	6^{3}
24	(Spain) F Verdasco	6	7^{7}	7^{7}
28	(Germany) P Kohlschreiber	7	6	6
(Spain) P Riba	5	4	1
(Ukraine) S Stakhovsky	3	4	6	3
(Uzbekistan) D Istomin	6	6	2	6
(Australia) M Matosevic	7^{7}	6	6^{1}	7
(Germany) D Brown	6^{5}	4	7^{7}	5
(Kazakhstan) A Golubev	1	4	6	3
7	(United Kingdom) A Murray	6	6	3	6

Second round
12	(France) R Gasquet	7^{7}	6	6
(Argentina) C Berlocq	6^{5}	4	4
PR	(Uruguay) P Cuevas	6	7^{8}	5	4	3
24	(Spain) F Verdasco	4	6^{6}	7	6	6
28	(Germany) P Kohlschreiber	6	7^{7}	6
(Uzbekistan) D Istomin	3	6^{5}	2
(Australia) M Matosevic	3	1	3
7	(United Kingdom) A Murray	6	6	6

Third round
12	(France) R Gasquet	3	2	3
24	(Spain) F Verdasco	6	6	6
28	(Germany) P Kohlschreiber	6	3	3	6	10
7	(United Kingdom) A Murray	3	6	6	4	12

Fourth round
24	(Spain) F Verdasco	4	5	6^{3}
7	(United Kingdom) A Murray	6	7	7^{7}

=== Bottom half ===
==== Section 5 ====
First round
6	(Czech Republic) T Berdych	6	6	6
Q	(Canada) P Polansky	3	4	4
(India) S Devvarman	7	3	6^{4}	3
(Kazakhstan) A Nedovyesov	5	6	7^{7}	6
(Colombia) A Falla	3	4	6^{4}
(France) B Paire	6	6	7^{7}
Q	(Italy) P Lorenzi	3	5	2
27	(Spain) R Bautista Agut	6	7	6
17	(Spain) T Robredo	4	6	6	6
Q	(United Kingdom) J Ward	6	4	2	4
(Spain) A Montañés	1^{r}
(France) K de Schepper	3
(France) N Mahut	3	7^{7}	3	4
(Kazakhstan) M Kukushkin	6	6^{4}	6	6
WC	(France) P-H Herbert	6^{5}	6^{4}	5
10	(United States) J Isner	7^{7}	7^{7}	7

Second round
6	(Czech Republic) T Berdych	6^{4}	6	7	6
(Kazakhstan) A Nedovyesov	7^{7}	4	5	3
(France) B Paire	4	6^{4}	2
27	(Spain) R Bautista Agut	6	7^{7}	6
17	(Spain) T Robredo	6	6	6
(France) K de Schepper	2	3	3
(Kazakhstan) M Kukushkin	7^{8}	6^{4}	3	6^{4}
10	(United States) J Isner	6^{6}	7^{7}	6	7^{7}

Third round
6	(Czech Republic) T Berdych	6	6	6^{4}	6
27	(Spain) R Bautista Agut	1	2	7^{7}	4
17	(Spain) T Robredo	6^{13}	6^{3}	7^{7}	5
10	(United States) J Isner	7^{15}	7^{7}	6^{5}	7

Fourth round
6	(Czech Republic) T Berdych	6	6	6
10	(United States) J Isner	4	4	4

==== Section 6 ====
First round
15	(Russia) M Youzhny	3	1	6	6	6
(Spain) P Carreño Busta	6	6	3	4	0
(Czech Republic) R Štěpánek	6^{8}	3	6	6	6
(Argentina) F Argüello	7^{10}	6	4	3	2
Q	(Argentina) F Bagnis	6	6	1	3	18
(France) J Benneteau	1	2	6	6	16
(Poland) Ł Kubot	6	4	5	1
18	(Latvia) E Gulbis	4	6	7	6
31	(Russia) D Tursunov	6	7	6
Q	(Italy) P Starace	1	5	2
(Italy) F Volandri	6^{3}	4	3
(United States) S Querrey	7^{7}	6	6
Q	(Portugal) G Elias	4	2	5
Q	(Argentina) D Schwartzman	6	6	7
(Slovakia) L Lacko	2	4	2
4	(Switzerland) R Federer	6	6	6

Second round
15	(Russia) M Youzhny	0	3	6	4
(Czech Republic) R Štěpánek	6	6	3	6
Q	(Argentina) F Bagnis	2	5	0
18	(Latvia) E Gulbis	6	7	6
31	(Russia) D Tursunov	6	7	6
(United States) S Querrey	4	5	1
Q	(Argentina) D Schwartzman	3	4	4
4	(Switzerland) R Federer	6	6	6

Third round
(Czech Republic) R Štěpánek	3	2	5
18	(Latvia) E Gulbis	6	6	7
31	(Russia) D Tursunov	5	7^{9}	2	4
4	(Switzerland) R Federer	7	6^{7}	6	6

Fourth round
18	(Latvia) E Gulbis	6^{5}	7^{7}	6	4	6
4	(Switzerland) R Federer	7^{7}	6^{3}	2	6	3

==== Section 7 ====
First round
8	(Canada) M Raonic	6	7^{7}	6
WC	(Australia) N Kyrgios	3	6^{1}	3
(Czech Republic) L Rosol	2	6^{6}	5
(Czech Republic) J Veselý	6	7^{8}	7
(United States) M Russell	2	4	7^{8}	1
(Colombia) A González	6	6	6^{6}	6
Q	(Croatia) A Pavić	1	1	3
29	(France) G Simon	6	6	6
20	(Ukraine) A Dolgopolov	7^{7}	6	6
(Spain) A Ramos	6^{4}	4	1
(Croatia) I Dodig	2^{r}
(Spain) M Granollers	2
(Netherlands) R Haase	7	6	6
(Russia) N Davydenko	5	4	2
(Slovakia) M Kližan	7^{7}	6	6
9	(Japan) K Nishikori	6^{4}	1	2

Second round
8	(Canada) M Raonic	7^{7}	6	6
(Czech Republic) J Veselý	6^{4}	4	1
(Colombia) A González	4	0	2
29	(France) G Simon	6	6	6
20	(Ukraine) A Dolgopolov	6	6	3	0	2
(Spain) M Granollers	1	3	6	6	6
(Netherlands) R Haase	1	6	1	6	5
(Slovakia) M Kližan	6	3	6	1	7

Third round
8	(Canada) M Raonic	4	6	2	6	7
29	(France) G Simon	6	3	6	2	5
(Spain) M Granollers	6^{5}	6	7^{7}	7
(Slovakia) M Kližan	7^{7}	2	6^{4}	5

Fourth round
8	(Canada) M Raonic	6	6	6
(Spain) M Granollers	3	3	3

==== Section 8 ====
First round
13	(France) J-W Tsonga	7^{7}	7	6
(France) É Roger-Vasselin	6^{4}	5	2
(Belgium) D Goffin	4	7	5	4
(Austria) J Melzer	6	5	7	6
(Finland) J Nieminen	6^{7}	6	6^{3}	6	6
(Poland) M Przysiężny	7^{9}	4	7^{7}	3	4
(Dominican Republic) V Estrella Burgos	1	4	7^{8}	4
22	(Poland) J Janowicz	6	6	6^{6}	6
25	(Croatia) M Čilić	6	6	7^{8}
(Spain) P Andújar	0	3	6^{6}
Q	(Slovakia) M Mečíř Jr.	5	6^{2}	6^{1}
(Germany) T Kamke	7	7^{7}	7^{7}
(France) J Chardy	7	6	6
(Spain) D Gimeno Traver	5	2	2
(Portugal) J Sousa	1	2	4
2	(Serbia) N Djokovic	6	6	6

Second round
13	(France) J-W Tsonga	6	6	6
(Austria) J Melzer	2	3	4
(Finland) J Nieminen	6^{4}	6^{4}	4
22	(Poland) J Janowicz	7^{7}	7^{7}	6
25	(Croatia) M Čilić	6	3	6	6
(Germany) T Kamke	3	6	3	0
(France) J Chardy	1	4	2
2	(Serbia) N Djokovic	6	6	6

Third round
13	(France) J-W Tsonga	6	6	6
22	(Poland) J Janowicz	4	4	3
25	(Croatia) M Čilić	3	2	7^{7}	4
2	(Serbia) N Djokovic	6	6	6^{2}	6

Fourth round
13	(France) J-W Tsonga	1	4	1
2	(Serbia) N Djokovic	6	6	6

Preceded by 2014 Australian Open – Men's singles	Grand Slam men's singles	Succeeded by 2014 Wimbledon Championships – Men's singles
