= 2014 French Open – Women's doubles =

Women's doubles
- 2014 French Open

Final
- Champions: (Chinese Taipei) Hsieh Su-wei (China) Peng Shuai
- Runners-up: (Italy) Sara Errani (Italy) Roberta Vinci
- Score: 6–4, 6–1

Details
- Draw: 64 (7WC)
- Seeds: 16

Events
| Singles | men | women | | boys | girls |
| Doubles | men | women | mixed | boys | girls |
| WC Singles | men | women | quad |
| WC Doubles | men | women | quad |
| Legends | −45 | 45+ | women |
- French Open

Ekaterina Makarova and Elena Vesnina were the defending champions, but lost in the second round to Julie Coin and Pauline Parmentier.

Hsieh Su-wei and Peng Shuai won the title, defeating Sara Errani and Roberta Vinci in the final, 6–4, 6–1.

== Seeds ==
1. (Chinese Taipei) Hsieh Su-wei / (China) Peng Shuai (champions)
2. (Italy) Sara Errani / (Italy) Roberta Vinci (final)
3. (Russia) Ekaterina Makarova / (Russia) Elena Vesnina (second round)
4. (Czech Republic) Květa Peschke / (Slovenia) Katarina Srebotnik (quarterfinals)
5. (Zimbabwe) Cara Black / (India) Sania Mirza (quarterfinals)
6. (United States) Raquel Kops-Jones / (United States) Abigail Spears (second round)
7. (Australia) Ashleigh Barty / (Australia) Casey Dellacqua (quarterfinals)
8. (Germany) Julia Görges / (Germany) Anna-Lena Grönefeld (first round)
9. (Czech Republic) Andrea Hlaváčková / (Czech Republic) Lucie Šafářová (first round)
10. (Russia) Alla Kudryavtseva / (Australia) Anastasia Rodionova (first round)
11. (Spain) Anabel Medina Garrigues / (Kazakhstan) Yaroslava Shvedova (first round)
12. (France) Kristina Mladenovic / (Italy) Flavia Pennetta (third round)
13. (United States) Vania King / (China) Zheng Jie (first round)
14. (Czech Republic) Klára Koukalová / (Romania) Monica Niculescu (second round)
15. (United States) Liezel Huber / (United States) Lisa Raymond (third round)
16. (New Zealand) Marina Erakovic / (Spain) Arantxa Parra Santonja (quarterfinals)

== Main draw ==
Key

- Q = Qualifier
- WC = Wild card
- LL = Lucky loser
- Alt = Alternate
- ITF = ITF entry
- PR = Protected ranking
- SR = Special ranking
- SE = Special exempt
- JE = Junior exempt
- JR = Junior Accelerator Programme entrant
- CO = College Accelerator Programme entrant
- NG = Next Gen Accelerator Program entrant
- w/o = Walkover
- r = Retired
- d = Defaulted

=== Finals ===
Quarterfinals
1 | (Chinese Taipei) Hsieh Su-wei (China) Peng Shuai | 6 | 3 | 6
5 | (Zimbabwe) Cara Black (India) Sania Mirza | 2 | 6 | 3
4 | (Czech Republic) Květa Peschke (Slovenia) Katarina Srebotnik | 4 | 4
(Spain) Garbiñe Muguruza (Spain) Carla Suárez Navarro | 6 | 6
(Czech Republic) Lucie Hradecká (Netherlands) Michaëlla Krajicek | 7 | 6
16 | (New Zealand) Marina Erakovic (Spain) Arantxa Parra Santonja | 5 | 3
7 | (Australia) Ashleigh Barty (Australia) Casey Dellacqua | 0 | 1
2 | (Italy) Sara Errani (Italy) Roberta Vinci | 6 | 6

Semifinals
1 | (Chinese Taipei) Hsieh Su-wei (China) Peng Shuai | 6 | 5 | 6
(Spain) Garbiñe Muguruza (Spain) Carla Suárez Navarro | 2 | 7 | 2
(Czech Republic) Lucie Hradecká (Netherlands) Michaëlla Krajicek | 2 | 1
2 | (Italy) Sara Errani (Italy) Roberta Vinci | 6 | 6

Final
1 | (Chinese Taipei) Hsieh Su-wei (China) Peng Shuai | 6 | 6
2 | (Italy) Sara Errani (Italy) Roberta Vinci | 4 | 1

=== Top half ===
==== Section 1 ====
First round
1 | (Chinese Taipei) S-w Hsieh (China) S Peng | 6 | 6
(Russia) S Kuznetsova (Australia) S Stosur | 2 | 4
(Serbia) B Jovanovski (Croatia) D Jurak | 1 | 3
(Russia) V Dushevina (China) S Zheng | 6 | 6
(Chinese Taipei) H-c Chan (Chinese Taipei) Y-j Chan | 7 | 6
(Japan) K Nara (Slovakia) AK Schmiedlová | 5 | 0
PR | (Czech Republic) P Cetkovská (Czech Republic) I Melzer | 2 | 6^{4}
15 | (United States) L Huber (United States) L Raymond | 6 | 7^{7}
9 | (Czech Republic) A Hlaváčková (Czech Republic) L Šafářová | 6^{4} | 6 | 1
(Canada) S Fichman (Russia) A Pavlyuchenkova | 7^{7} | 3 | 6
(Belarus) O Govortsova (Ukraine) O Savchuk | 0 | 1
(Serbia) J Janković (Russia) A Kleybanova | 6 | 6
(Croatia) A Tomljanović (China) S Zhang | 1 | 3
(Canada) G Dabrowski (Poland) A Rosolska | 6 | 6
(Slovakia) D Hantuchová (Israel) S Pe'er | 3 | 3
5 | (Zimbabwe) C Black (India) S Mirza | 6 | 6

Second round
1 | (Chinese Taipei) S-w Hsieh (China) S Peng | 6 | 6
(Russia) V Dushevina (China) S Zheng | 1 | 3
(Chinese Taipei) H-c Chan (Chinese Taipei) Y-j Chan | 4 | 2
15 | (United States) L Huber (United States) L Raymond | 6 | 6
(Canada) S Fichman (Russia) A Pavlyuchenkova
(Serbia) J Janković (Russia) A Kleybanova | w/o
(Canada) G Dabrowski (Poland) A Rosolska | 1 | 2
5 | (Zimbabwe) C Black (India) S Mirza | 6 | 6

Third round
1 | (Chinese Taipei) S-w Hsieh (China) S Peng | 6 | 6
15 | (United States) L Huber (United States) L Raymond | 0 | 2
(Serbia) J Janković (Russia) A Kleybanova | 3 | 3
5 | (Zimbabwe) C Black (India) S Mirza | 6 | 6

Quarterfinals
1 | (Chinese Taipei) S-w Hsieh (China) S Peng | 6 | 3 | 6
5 | (Zimbabwe) C Black (India) S Mirza | 2 | 6 | 3

==== Section 2 ====
First round
4 | (Czech Republic) K Peschke (Slovenia) K Srebotnik | 6 | 6
(United States) L Davis (United States) M Moulton-Levy | 1 | 2
(Georgia (country)) O Kalashnikova (Poland) K Piter | 2 | 7^{7} | 6
(United States) C McHale (South Africa) C Scheepers | 6 | 6^{4} | 1
(Romania) S Cîrstea (Russia) M Kirilenko | 6 | 5 | 4
(Estonia) K Kanepi (Russia) A Panova | 4 | 7 | 6
PR | (Germany) T Maria (Ukraine) E Svitolina | 7^{7} | 7^{8}
13 | (United States) V King (China) J Zheng | 6^{4} | 6^{6}
10 | (Russia) A Kudryavtseva (Australia) A Rodionova | 6 | 4 | 4
(Slovenia) A Klepač (Spain) MT Torró Flor | 1 | 6 | 6
(Spain) G Muguruza (Spain) C Suárez Navarro | 7 | 6
(Croatia) M Lučić-Baroni (United States) S Stephens | 5 | 4
WC | (Germany) M Barthel (France) V Razzano | 4 | 3
(Romania) I-C Begu (Italy) K Knapp | 6 | 6
(Austria) S Klemenschits (Austria) Y Meusburger | 3 | 3
6 | (United States) R Kops-Jones (United States) A Spears | 6 | 6

Second round
4 | (Czech Republic) K Peschke (Slovenia) K Srebotnik | 7^{7} | 6
(Georgia (country)) O Kalashnikova (Poland) K Piter | 6^{2} | 4
(Estonia) K Kanepi (Russia) A Panova | 6 | 6
PR | (Germany) T Maria (Ukraine) E Svitolina | 2 | 3
(Slovenia) A Klepač (Spain) MT Torró Flor | 6 | 2 | 2
(Spain) G Muguruza (Spain) C Suárez Navarro | 0 | 6 | 6
(Romania) I-C Begu (Italy) K Knapp | 4 | 7 | 7
6 | (United States) R Kops-Jones (United States) A Spears | 6 | 5 | 5

Third round
4 | (Czech Republic) K Peschke (Slovenia) K Srebotnik | 6 | 6
(Estonia) K Kanepi (Russia) A Panova | 3 | 1
(Spain) G Muguruza (Spain) C Suárez Navarro | 6 | 7^{7}
(Romania) I-C Begu (Italy) K Knapp | 4 | 6^{4}

Quarterfinals
4 | (Czech Republic) K Peschke (Slovenia) K Srebotnik | 4 | 4
(Spain) G Muguruza (Spain) C Suárez Navarro | 6 | 6

=== Bottom half ===
==== Section 3 ====
First round
8 | (Germany) J Görges (Germany) A-L Grönefeld | 5 | 6 | 5
(Slovakia) D Cibulková (Belgium) K Flipkens | 7 | 2 | 7
(United States) M Keys (United States) A Riske | 2 | 6 | 6
WC | (France) I Ramialison (France) C Sibille | 6 | 3 | 3
(Czech Republic) L Hradecká (Netherlands) M Krajicek | 6 | 6
(Italy) F Schiavone (Spain) S Soler Espinosa | 4 | 3
(Japan) K Date-Krumm (Czech Republic) B Záhlavová-Strýcová | 6 | 6
11 | (Spain) A Medina Garrigues (Kazakhstan) Y Shvedova | 4 | 2
16 | (New Zealand) M Erakovic (Spain) A Parra Santonja | 7^{8} | 6
PR | (Poland) K Jans-Ignacik (Ukraine) M Zanevska | 6^{6} | 4
(Romania) R Olaru (Croatia) D Vekić | 1 | 6 | 1
(Germany) K Barrois (Germany) A Beck | 6 | 1 | 6
PR | (Ukraine) I Buryachok (Czech Republic) V Uhlířová | 3 | 3
WC | (France) J Coin (France) P Parmentier | 6 | 6
WC | (France) A Collombon (France) C Paquet | 2 | 3
3 | (Russia) E Makarova (Russia) E Vesnina | 6 | 6

Second round
(Slovakia) D Cibulková (Belgium) K Flipkens
(United States) M Keys (United States) A Riske | w/o
(Czech Republic) L Hradecká (Netherlands) M Krajicek | 6 | 3 | 6
(Japan) K Date-Krumm (Czech Republic) B Záhlavová-Strýcová | 3 | 6 | 3
16 | (New Zealand) M Erakovic (Spain) A Parra Santonja | 7 | 6
(Germany) K Barrois (Germany) A Beck | 5 | 1
WC | (France) J Coin (France) P Parmentier | 6 | 5 | 6
3 | (Russia) E Makarova (Russia) E Vesnina | 3 | 7 | 3

Third round
(United States) M Keys (United States) A Riske | 6^{6} | 6 | 1
(Czech Republic) L Hradecká (Netherlands) M Krajicek | 7^{8} | 3 | 6
16 | (New Zealand) M Erakovic (Spain) A Parra Santonja | 6 | 6
WC | (France) J Coin (France) P Parmentier | 2 | 3

Quarterfinals
(Czech Republic) L Hradecká (Netherlands) M Krajicek | 7 | 6
16 | (New Zealand) M Erakovic (Spain) A Parra Santonja | 5 | 3

==== Section 4 ====
First round
7 | (Australia) A Barty (Australia) C Dellacqua | 6 | 6
(Slovenia) P Hercog (Argentina) P Ormaechea | 2 | 3
WC | (France) S Foretz Gacon (France) L Thorpe | 2 | 6^{3}
(Slovakia) J Čepelová (Switzerland) S Vögele | 6 | 7^{7}
Alt | (Czech Republic) Ka Plíšková (Czech Republic) Kr Plíšková | 6 | 3 | 3
(Australia) J Gajdošová (Slovakia) J Husárová | 1 | 6 | 6
(France) A Cornet (France) C Garcia | 6 | 1 | 2
12 | (France) K Mladenovic (Italy) F Pennetta | 3 | 6 | 6
14 | (Czech Republic) K Koukalová (Romania) M Niculescu | 6^{1} | 6 | 6
(Puerto Rico) M Puig (Belgium) Y Wickmayer | 7^{7} | 0 | 3
(Germany) A Petkovic (Slovakia) M Rybáriková | 6 | 6
WC | (France) C Feuerstein (France) A Lim | 1 | 3
WC | (France) A Hesse (France) M Johansson | 1 | 4
(Japan) S Aoyama (Czech Republic) R Voráčová | 6 | 6
(Hungary) T Babos (United States) V Lepchenko | 1 | 3
2 | (Italy) S Errani (Italy) R Vinci | 6 | 6

Second round
7 | (Australia) A Barty (Australia) C Dellacqua | 6 | 6
(Slovakia) J Čepelová (Switzerland) S Vögele | 1 | 2
(Australia) J Gajdošová (Slovakia) J Husárová | 3 | 3
12 | (France) K Mladenovic (Italy) F Pennetta | 6 | 6
14 | (Czech Republic) K Koukalová (Romania) M Niculescu | 6 | 2 | 4
(Germany) A Petkovic (Slovakia) M Rybáriková | 1 | 6 | 6
(Japan) S Aoyama (Czech Republic) R Voráčová | 4 | 4
2 | (Italy) S Errani (Italy) R Vinci | 6 | 6

Third round
7 | (Australia) A Barty (Australia) C Dellacqua | 4 | 6 | 6
12 | (France) K Mladenovic (Italy) F Pennetta | 6 | 2 | 1
(Germany) A Petkovic (Slovakia) M Rybáriková | 5 | 6 | 3
2 | (Italy) S Errani (Italy) R Vinci | 7 | 3 | 6

Quarterfinals
7 | (Australia) A Barty (Australia) C Dellacqua | 0 | 1
2 | (Italy) S Errani (Italy) R Vinci | 6 | 6
