= 2011 Büschl Open – Singles =

Singles
- 2011 Büschl Open

Final
- Champion: (United Kingdom) Anne Keothavong
- Runner-up: (Austria) Yvonne Meusburger
- Score: 6–3, 1–6, 6–2

Events
Singles	Doubles
← 2010 ·	Büschl Open	· 2012 →

Urszula Radwańska was the defending champion, but chose not to participate.

Anne Keothavong won the title defeating Yvonne Meusburger in the final 6–3, 1–6, 6–2.

== Seeds ==
1. (Sweden) Sofia Arvidsson (first round)
2. (Germany) Kristina Barrois (first round)
3. (United Kingdom) Anne Keothavong (champion)
4. (Czech Republic) Andrea Hlaváčková (first round)
5. (Austria) Patricia Mayr-Achleitner (first round)
6. (Czech Republic) Eva Birnerová (quarterfinals)
7. ~~(Netherlands) Michaëlla Krajicek~~ (withdrew)
8. (Germany) Kathrin Wörle (first round)
9. (Czech Republic) Sandra Záhlavová (second round)

== Main draw ==
=== Key ===
- Q = Qualifier
- WC = Wild card
- LL = Lucky loser
- Alt = Alternate
- SE = Special exempt
- PR = Protected ranking
- ITF = ITF entry
- JE = Junior exempt
- w/o = Walkover
- r = Retired
- d = Defaulted
- SR = Special ranking

=== Finals ===
Semifinals
(Netherlands) Kiki Bertens	4	2
3	(United Kingdom) Anne Keothavong	6	6
WC	(Germany) Dinah Pfizenmaier	4	0
(Austria) Yvonne Meusburger	6	6

Final
3	(United Kingdom) Anne Keothavong	6	1	6
(Austria) Yvonne Meusburger	3	6	2

=== Top half ===
First round
1	(Sweden) S Arvidsson	6^{6}	0^{r}
(Germany) S Gronert	7^{8}	0
(Ukraine) T Arefyeva	1	4
(United Kingdom) N Broady	6	6
(Slovakia) K Kučová	4	2
(Netherlands) K Bertens	6	6
(Slovakia) L Juríková	2	3
9	(Czech Republic) S Záhlavová	6	6
3	(United Kingdom) A Keothavong	6	6
(Liechtenstein) S Vogt	2	2
LL	(Germany) K Grajdek	6	7
WC	(Germany) C Shakovets	4	5
(Germany) T Malek	6	6
WC	(Germany) N Zander	2	3
Q	(Germany) C Witthöft	1	6	6
5	(Austria) M Mayr-Achleitner	6	1	4

Second round
(Germany) S Gronert	6	6^{7}	6^{5}
(United Kingdom) N Broady	2	7^{9}	7^{7}
(Netherlands) K Bertens	6	3	6
9	(Czech Republic) S Záhlavová	3	6	4
3	(United Kingdom) A Keothavong	6	7^{7}
LL	(Germany) K Grajdek	4	6^{5}
(Germany) T Malek	6	7^{7}
Q	(Germany) C Witthöft	3	6^{5}

Quarterfinals
(United Kingdom) N Broady	6^{11}	6^{5}
(Netherlands) K Bertens	7^{13}	7^{7}
3	(United Kingdom) A Keothavong	6	6
(Germany) T Malek	4	4

Semifinals
(Netherlands) K Bertens	4	2
3	(United Kingdom) A Keothavong	6	6

=== Bottom half ===
First round
8	(Germany) K Wörle	4	3
(Germany) A Beck	6	6
Q	(Russia) D Gavrilova	6^{8}	6	2
LL	(Slovenia) D Jakupovič	7^{10}	3	6
Q	(Russia) V Solovieva	5	3
Q	(Germany) V Henke	7	6
WC	(Germany) D Pfizenmaier	4	6	6
4	(Czech Republic) A Hlaváčková	6	3	3
6	(Czech Republic) E Birnerová	3	7	6
(Slovenia) M Zec Peškirič	6	5	1
(Romania) M Gojnea	6^{9}	6	5
(Georgia (country)) M Chakhnashvili	7^{11}	2	3^{r}
WC	(Germany) S Haas	4	2
(Austria) Y Meusburger	6	6
(Italy) K Knapp	7^{9}	6
2	(Germany) K Barrois	6^{7}	4

Second round
(Germany) A Beck	6	6
LL	(Slovenia) D Jakupovič	3	1
Q	(Germany) V Henke	2	1
WC	(Germany) D Pfizenmaier	6	6
6	(Czech Republic) E Birnerová	6	7^{7}
(Romania) M Gojnea	2	6^{3}
(Austria) Y Meusburger	6	6
(Italy) K Knapp	4	4

Quarterfinals
(Germany) A Beck	1	2
WC	(Germany) D Pfizenmaier	6	6
6	(Czech Republic) E Birnerová	3	2
(Austria) Y Meusburger	6	6

Semifinals
WC	(Germany) D Pfizenmaier	4	0
(Austria) Y Meusburger	6	6
