= 2014 French Open – Women's singles =

Women's singles
- 2014 French Open

Final
- Champion: (Russia) Maria Sharapova
- Runner-up: (Romania) Simona Halep
- Score: 6–4, 6–7^{(5–7)}, 6–4

Events
| Singles | men | women | | boys | girls |
| Doubles | men | women | mixed | boys | girls |
| WC Singles | men | women | quad |
| WC Doubles | men | women | quad |
| Legends | −45 | 45+ | women |
| ← 2013 · | French Open | · 2015 → |

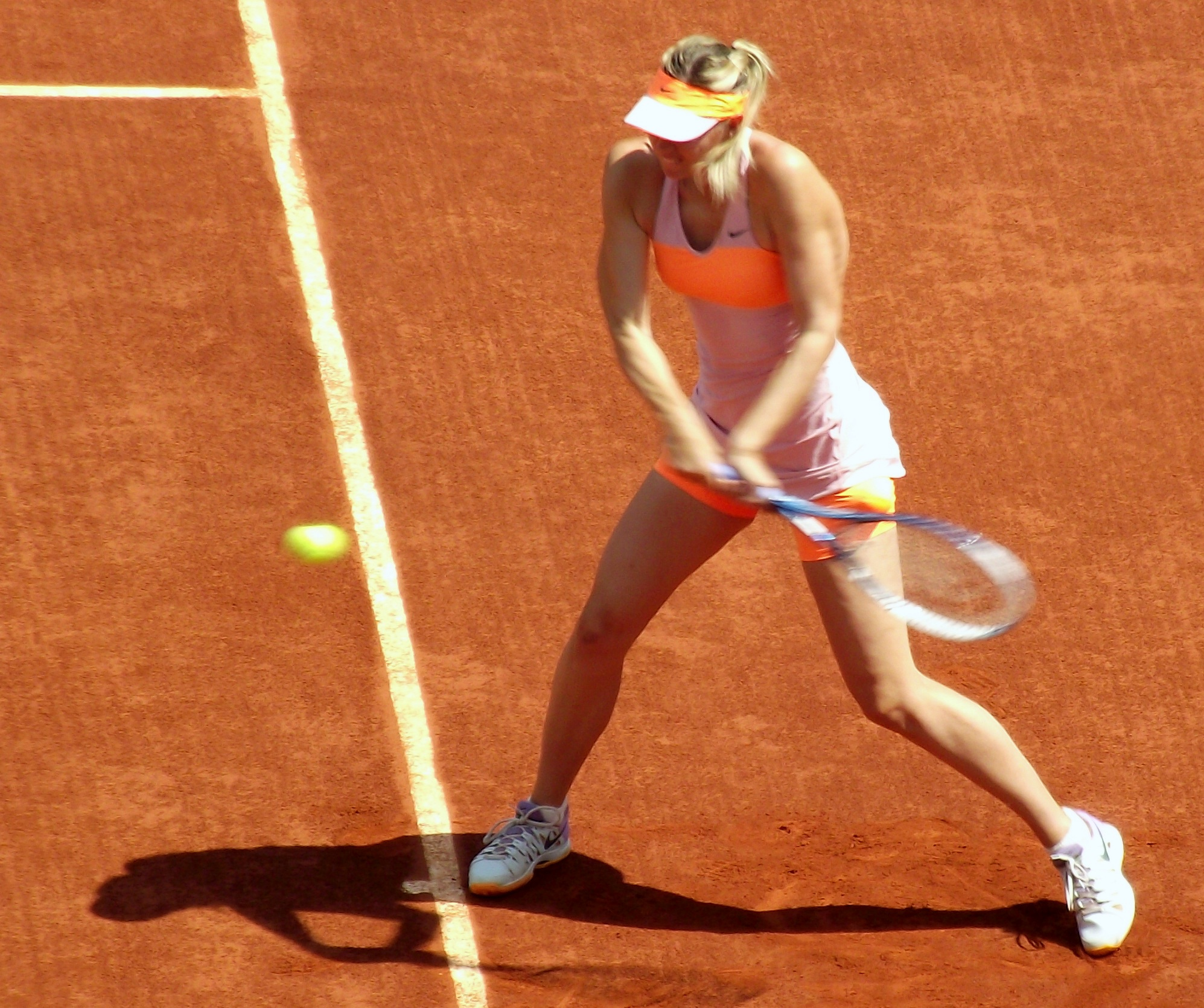
Maria Sharapova

Maria Sharapova defeated Simona Halep in the final, 6–4, 6–7^{(5–7)}, 6–4 to win the women's singles tennis title at the 2014 French Open. It was her second French Open title and her fifth and last major title overall. In a final that lasted over three hours, it was the first time since 2001 that the final went to three sets. Halep was the first Romanian to reach the final since Virginia Ruzici in 1980.

Serena Williams was the defending champion, but was defeated in the second round by Garbiñe Muguruza.

The top three seeds (Williams, Li Na and Agnieszka Radwańska) were in contention for the world No. 1 singles ranking. However, they all failed to reach the fourth round and so Williams retained the top spot. As a result, this marked the first time in the Open Era the top three seeds all failed to reach the round of 16 at a major.

== Seeds ==
1. (United States) Serena Williams (second round)
2. (China) Li Na (first round)
3. (Poland) Agnieszka Radwańska (third round)
4. (Romania) Simona Halep (final)
5. (Czech Republic) Petra Kvitová (third round)
6. (Serbia) Jelena Janković (fourth round)
7. (Russia) Maria Sharapova (champion)
8. (Germany) Angelique Kerber (fourth round)
9. (Slovakia) Dominika Cibulková (third round)
10. (Italy) Sara Errani (quarterfinals)
11. (Serbia) Ana Ivanovic (third round)
12. (Italy) Flavia Pennetta (second round)
13. (Denmark) Caroline Wozniacki (first round)
14. (Spain) Carla Suárez Navarro (quarterfinals)
15. (United States) Sloane Stephens (fourth round)
16. (Germany) Sabine Lisicki (second round, retired because of a right wrist injury)

17. (Italy) Roberta Vinci (first round)
18. (Canada) Eugenie Bouchard (semifinals)
19. (Australia) Samantha Stosur (fourth round)
20. (France) Alizé Cornet (second round)
21. (Belgium) Kirsten Flipkens (second round)
22. (Russia) Ekaterina Makarova (third round)
23. (Czech Republic) Lucie Šafářová (fourth round)
24. (Russia) Anastasia Pavlyuchenkova (second round, retired because of back pain)
25. (Estonia) Kaia Kanepi (first round)
26. (Romania) Sorana Cîrstea (third round)
27. (Russia) Svetlana Kuznetsova (quarterfinals)
28. (Germany) Andrea Petkovic (semifinals)
29. (United States) Venus Williams (second round)
30. (Czech Republic) Klára Koukalová (first round)
31. (Slovakia) Daniela Hantuchová (third round)
32. (Russia) Elena Vesnina (second round)

== Draw ==
=== Key ===
- Q = Qualifier
- WC = Wild card
- LL = Lucky loser
- Alt = Alternate
- ITF = ITF entry
- PR = Protected ranking
- SR = Special ranking
- SE = Special exempt
- JE = Junior exempt
- JR = Junior Accelerator Programme entrant
- CO = College Accelerator Programme entrant
- NG = Next Gen Accelerator Program entrant
- w/o = Walkover
- r = Retired
- d = Defaulted

=== Finals ===
Quarterfinals
(Spain) Garbiñe Muguruza | 6 | 5 | 1
7 | (Russia) Maria Sharapova | 1 | 7 | 6
14 | (Spain) Carla Suárez Navarro | 6^{4} | 6 | 5
18 | (Canada) Eugenie Bouchard | 7^{7} | 2 | 7
27 | (Russia) Svetlana Kuznetsova | 2 | 2
4 | (Romania) Simona Halep | 6 | 6
10 | (Italy) Sara Errani | 2 | 2
28 | (Germany) Andrea Petkovic | 6 | 6

Semifinals
7 | (Russia) Maria Sharapova | 4 | 7 | 6
18 | (Canada) Eugenie Bouchard | 6 | 5 | 2
4 | (Romania) Simona Halep | 6 | 7^{7}
28 | (Germany) Andrea Petkovic | 2 | 6^{4}

Final
7 | (Russia) Maria Sharapova | 6 | 6^{5} | 6
4 | (Romania) Simona Halep | 4 | 7^{7} | 4

=== Top half ===
==== Section 1 ====
First round
1 | (United States) S Williams | 6 | 6
WC | (France) A Lim | 2 | 1
Q | (United States) G Min | 5 | 6^{6}
(Spain) G Muguruza | 7 | 7^{8}
(Slovakia) AK Schmiedlová | 6^{2} | 6 | 6
(China) J Zheng | 7^{7} | 3 | 4
(Switzerland) B Bencic | 4 | 1
29 | (United States) V Williams | 6 | 6
17 | (Italy) R Vinci | 6 | 3 | 2
WC | (France) P Parmentier | 3 | 6 | 6
(Kazakhstan) Y Shvedova | 3 | 7 | 6
(United States) L Davis | 6 | 5 | 4
(Italy) K Knapp | 4 | 0
(Germany) M Barthel | 6 | 6
WC | (France) F Ferro | 1 | 5
16 | (Germany) S Lisicki | 6 | 7

Second round
1 | (United States) S Williams | 2 | 2
(Spain) G Muguruza | 6 | 6
(Slovakia) AK Schmiedlová | 2 | 6 | 6
29 | (United States) V Williams | 6 | 3 | 4
WC | (France) P Parmentier | 1 | 6 | 6
(Kazakhstan) Y Shvedova | 6 | 3 | 3
(Germany) M Barthel | 6 | 3
16 | (Germany) S Lisicki | 1 | 0^{r}

Third round
(Spain) G Muguruza | 6 | 6
(Slovakia) AK Schmiedlová | 2 | 4
WC | (France) P Parmentier | 1 | 6 | 7
(Germany) M Barthel | 6 | 1 | 5

Fourth round
(Spain) G Muguruza | 6 | 6
WC | (France) P Parmentier | 4 | 2

==== Section 2 ====
First round
9 | (Slovakia) D Cibulková | 7 | 6
(France) V Razzano | 5 | 0
Q | (Austria) T Paszek | 6 | 7^{7}
(Belgium) A Van Uytvanck | 2 | 6^{5}
WC | (France) A Hesse | 6 | 3 | 4
(Austria) Y Meusburger | 3 | 6 | 6
(Puerto Rico) M Puig | 1 | 1
19 | (Australia) S Stosur | 6 | 6
25 | (Estonia) K Kanepi | 7 | 3 | 1
(Romania) M Niculescu | 5 | 6 | 6
(Switzerland) R Oprandi | 5 | 2
(Argentina) P Ormaechea | 7 | 6
(Germany) A Beck | 7^{7} | 3 | 2
(Bulgaria) T Pironkova | 6^{5} | 6 | 6
Q | (Russia) K Pervak | 1 | 2
7 | (Russia) M Sharapova | 6 | 6

Second round
9 | (Slovakia) D Cibulková | 6 | 6
Q | (Austria) T Paszek | 3 | 4
(Austria) Y Meusburger | 1 | 3
19 | (Australia) S Stosur | 6 | 6
(Romania) M Niculescu | 6 | 5 | 2
(Argentina) P Ormaechea | 2 | 7 | 6
(Bulgaria) T Pironkova | 5 | 2
7 | (Russia) M Sharapova | 7 | 6

Third round
9 | (Slovakia) D Cibulková | 4 | 4
19 | (Australia) S Stosur | 6 | 6
(Argentina) P Ormaechea | 0 | 0
7 | (Russia) M Sharapova | 6 | 6

Fourth round
19 | (Australia) S Stosur | 6 | 4 | 0
7 | (Russia) M Sharapova | 3 | 6 | 6

==== Section 3 ====
First round
3 | (Poland) A Radwańska | 6 | 6
(China) S Zhang | 3 | 0
WC | (France) M Johansson | 1 | 6^{5}
(Czech Republic) Ka Plíšková | 6 | 7^{7}
(Croatia) A Tomljanović | 6 | 6
(Italy) F Schiavone | 3 | 3
(United States) C McHale | 6^{0} | 6 | 3
32 | (Russia) E Vesnina | 7^{7} | 4 | 6
20 | (France) A Cornet | 6 | 6
WC | (Australia) A Barty | 2 | 1
WC | (United States) T Townsend | 7 | 6
(United States) V King | 5 | 1
Q | (Switzerland) T Bacsinszky | 6 | 6
Q | (Ukraine) M Zanevska | 1 | 4
Q | (Ukraine) Y Beygelzimer | 5 | 5
14 | (Spain) C Suárez Navarro | 7 | 7

Second round
3 | (Poland) A Radwańska | 6 | 6
(Czech Republic) Ka Plíšková | 3 | 4
(Croatia) A Tomljanović | 7^{8} | 6
32 | (Russia) E Vesnina | 6^{6} | 2
20 | (France) A Cornet | 4 | 6 | 4
WC | (United States) T Townsend | 6 | 4 | 6
Q | (Switzerland) T Bacsinszky | 5 | 6 | 4
14 | (Spain) C Suárez Navarro | 7 | 1 | 6

Third round
3 | (Poland) A Radwańska | 4 | 4
(Croatia) A Tomljanović | 6 | 6
WC | (United States) T Townsend | 2 | 2
14 | (Spain) C Suárez Navarro | 6 | 6

Fourth round
(Croatia) A Tomljanović | 3 | 3
14 | (Spain) C Suárez Navarro | 6 | 6

==== Section 4 ====
First round
12 | (Italy) F Pennetta | 6 | 6
(Austria) P Mayr-Achleitner | 2 | 2
(Russia) M Kirilenko | 1 | 2
(Sweden) J Larsson | 6 | 6
Q | (Portugal) M Larcher de Brito | 2 | 3
(Germany) J Görges | 6 | 6
(Israel) S Pe'er | 0 | 2
18 | (Canada) E Bouchard | 6 | 6
31 | (Slovakia) D Hantuchová | 2 | 6 | 6
(Serbia) J Jakšić | 6 | 2 | 4
WC | (France) C Feuerstein | 6 | 7
(Belarus) O Govortsova | 1 | 5
(Czech Republic) P Cetkovská | 4 | 1
(United States) V Lepchenko | 6 | 6
(Poland) K Piter | 3 | 1
8 | (Germany) A Kerber | 6 | 6

Second round
12 | (Italy) F Pennetta | 7 | 4 | 2
(Sweden) J Larsson | 5 | 6 | 6
(Germany) J Görges | 6 | 2 | 1
18 | (Canada) E Bouchard | 2 | 6 | 6
31 | (Slovakia) D Hantuchová | 6 | 6
WC | (France) C Feuerstein | 1 | 4
(United States) V Lepchenko | 2 | 5
8 | (Germany) A Kerber | 6 | 7

Third round
(Sweden) J Larsson | 5 | 4
18 | (Canada) E Bouchard | 7 | 6
31 | (Slovakia) D Hantuchová | 5 | 3
8 | (Germany) A Kerber | 7 | 6

Fourth round
18 | (Canada) E Bouchard | 6 | 6
8 | (Germany) A Kerber | 1 | 2

=== Bottom half ===
==== Section 5 ====
First round
5 | (Czech Republic) P Kvitová | 7 | 6
(Kazakhstan) Z Diyas | 5 | 2
(New Zealand) M Erakovic | 6 | 6
(Ukraine) N Kichenok | 2 | 1
(Serbia) B Jovanovski | 4 | 3
(Italy) C Giorgi | 6 | 6
Q | (Georgia (country)) S Shapatava | 3 | 1
27 | (Russia) S Kuznetsova | 6 | 6
23 | (Czech Republic) L Šafářová | 6 | 7
(Luxembourg) M Minella | 3 | 5
(Australia) C Dellacqua | 7 | 6
(Spain) L Domínguez Lino | 5 | 3
(Ukraine) E Svitolina | 5
(Croatia) P Martić | 0^{r}
(France) C Garcia | 1 | 3
11 | (Serbia) A Ivanovic | 6 | 6

Second round
5 | (Czech Republic) P Kvitová | 6 | 6
(New Zealand) M Erakovic | 4 | 4
(Italy) C Giorgi | 6^{5} | 3
27 | (Russia) S Kuznetsova | 7^{7} | 6
23 | (Czech Republic) L Šafářová | 6 | 5 | 6
(Australia) C Dellacqua | 1 | 7 | 3
(Ukraine) E Svitolina | 5 | 2
11 | (Serbia) A Ivanovic | 7 | 6

Third round
5 | (Czech Republic) P Kvitová | 7^{7} | 1 | 7
27 | (Russia) S Kuznetsova | 6^{3} | 6 | 9
23 | (Czech Republic) L Šafářová | 6 | 6
11 | (Serbia) A Ivanovic | 3 | 3

Fourth round
27 | (Russia) S Kuznetsova | 6 | 6
23 | (Czech Republic) L Šafářová | 3 | 4

==== Section 6 ====
First round
15 | (United States) S Stephens | 6 | 7^{10}
(China) S Peng | 4 | 6^{8}
(Slovenia) P Hercog | 6 | 6
(Slovakia) J Čepelová | 2 | 3
PR | (Czech Republic) I Melzer | 6^{6} | 2
(United States) C Vandeweghe | 7^{8} | 6
(United States) S Rogers | 2 | 3
22 | (Russia) E Makarova | 6 | 6
30 | (Czech Republic) K Koukalová | 6^{4} | 2
(Spain) MT Torró Flor | 7^{7} | 6
(Slovakia) M Rybáriková | 4 | 6 | 3
(Poland) U Radwańska | 6 | 4 | 0^{r}
Q | (United Kingdom) H Watson | 6 | 6
(Czech Republic) B Záhlavová-Strýcová | 3 | 4
(Russia) A Kleybanova | 0 | 2
4 | (Romania) S Halep | 6 | 6

Second round
15 | (United States) S Stephens | 6 | 6
(Slovenia) P Hercog | 1 | 3
(United States) C Vandeweghe | 4 | 3
22 | (Russia) E Makarova | 6 | 6
(Spain) MT Torró Flor | 6 | 2 | 6
(Slovakia) M Rybáriková | 2 | 6 | 2
Q | (United Kingdom) H Watson | 2 | 4
4 | (Romania) S Halep | 6 | 6

Third round
15 | (United States) S Stephens | 6 | 6
22 | (Russia) E Makarova | 3 | 4
(Spain) MT Torró Flor | 3 | 0
4 | (Romania) S Halep | 6 | 6

Fourth round
15 | (United States) S Stephens | 4 | 3
4 | (Romania) S Halep | 6 | 6

==== Section 7 ====
First round
6 | (Serbia) J Janković | 5 | 6 | 6
(Canada) S Fichman | 7 | 1 | 3
(United States) A Tatishvili | 1 | 4
(Japan) K Nara | 6 | 6
(Brazil) T Pereira | 4 | 6 | 6
(Thailand) L Kumkhum | 6 | 1 | 1
Q | (Canada) A Wozniak | 7^{7} | 5 | 2
26 | (Romania) S Cîrstea | 6^{3} | 7 | 6
21 | (Belgium) K Flipkens | 7^{8} | 6
Q | (Montenegro) D Kovinić | 6^{6} | 2
(Croatia) D Vekić | 5 | 6 | 4
(Israel) J Glushko | 7 | 2 | 6
(Spain) E Cabeza Candela | 6 | 3 | 3
(Germany) D Pfizenmaier | 4 | 6 | 6
(United States) M Keys | 5 | 6 | 1
10 | (Italy) S Errani | 7 | 3 | 6

Second round
6 | (Serbia) J Janković | 7 | 6
(Japan) K Nara | 5 | 0
(Brazil) T Pereira | 2 | 5
26 | (Romania) S Cîrstea | 6 | 7
21 | (Belgium) K Flipkens | 4 | 6 | 4
(Israel) J Glushko | 6 | 3 | 6
(Germany) D Pfizenmaier | 2 | 4
10 | (Italy) S Errani | 6 | 6

Third round
6 | (Serbia) J Janković | 6 | 6
26 | (Romania) S Cîrstea | 1 | 2
(Israel) J Glushko | 0 | 1
10 | (Italy) S Errani | 6 | 6

Fourth round
6 | (Serbia) J Janković | 6^{5} | 2
10 | (Italy) S Errani | 7^{7} | 6

==== Section 8 ====
First round
13 | (Denmark) C Wozniacki | 6^{5} | 6 | 2
(Belgium) Y Wickmayer | 7^{7} | 4 | 6
(Spain) S Soler Espinosa | 6 | 6
(South Africa) C Scheepers | 2 | 3
(Romania) A Cadanțu | 6^{5} | 1
Q | (Netherlands) K Bertens | 7^{7} | 6
(Japan) K Date-Krumm | 3 | 6 | 2
24 | (Russia) A Pavlyuchenkova | 6 | 0 | 6
28 | (Germany) A Petkovic | 6 | 6
(Japan) M Doi | 3 | 3
(Germany) A-L Friedsam | 7^{7} | 5 | 2
(Switzerland) S Vögele | 6^{3} | 7 | 6
(United States) A Riske | 7^{7} | 6
(Croatia) M Lučić-Baroni | 6^{2} | 3
(France) K Mladenovic | 7 | 3 | 6
2 | (China) N Li | 5 | 6 | 1

Second round
(Belgium) Y Wickmayer | 2 | 4
(Spain) S Soler Espinosa | 6 | 6
Q | (Netherlands) K Bertens | 5 | 6 | 3
24 | (Russia) A Pavlyuchenkova | 7 | 4 | 0^{r}
28 | (Germany) A Petkovic | 6 | 4 | 6
(Switzerland) S Vögele | 2 | 6 | 2
(United States) A Riske | 6^{5} | 6 | 3
(France) K Mladenovic | 7^{7} | 3 | 6

Third round
(Spain) S Soler Espinosa | 2 | 1
Q | (Netherlands) K Bertens | 6 | 6
28 | (Germany) A Petkovic | 6 | 4 | 6
(France) K Mladenovic | 4 | 6 | 4

Fourth round
Q | (Netherlands) K Bertens | 6 | 2 | 5
28 | (Germany) A Petkovic | 1 | 6 | 7

== Final ==
Seventh-seeded Sharapova beat 18th-seeded Eugenie Bouchard 4–6, 7–5, 6–2 in the first semi-final, while fourth-seeded Simona Halep beat 28th-seeded Andrea Petkovic, 6–2, 7–6^{(7–4)} in the second. In the first set, Halep won the first two games before Sharapova won five consecutive games. Halep fought back and narrowed the margin to 5–4, before Sharapova broke Halep to win the set 6–4. The second set went to a tiebreaker where Sharapova jumped out to a 5–3 lead. However, Halep won the next four points to take the set 7–6^{(7–5)}. While leading 2–1 in the third set, Halep had break point but Sharapova recovered and won the game. She then broke Halep to take a 4–2 lead. Halep held, then broke back to level the set at 4–4, but got broken again in the next game. Serving for the match, Sharapova held at love, taking the set 6–4. It was the first time since 2001 that the final went to 3 sets.

== Championship match statistics ==
| Category | (Russia) Sharapova | (Romania) Halep |
|---|---|---|
| 1st serve % | 74/115 (64%) | 72/112 (64%) |
| 1st serve points won | 45 of 74 = 61% | 41 of 72 = 57% |
| 2nd serve points won | 16 of 41 = 39% | 12 of 40 = 30% |
| Total service points won | 61 of 115 = 53.04% | 53 of 112 = 47.32% |
| Aces | 3 | 1 |
| Double faults | 12 | 4 |
| Winners | 40 | 19 |
| Unforced errors | 56 | 37 |
| Net points won | 8 of 11 = 73% | 6 of 10 = 60% |
| Break points converted | 9 of 20 = 45% | 7 of 13 = 54% |
| Return points won | 59 of 112 = 53% | 54 of 115 = 47% |
| Total points won | 120 | 107 |

| Preceded by 2014 Australian Open – Women's singles | Grand Slam women's singles | Succeeded by 2014 Wimbledon Championships – Women's singles |
