= 2012 Büschl Open – Doubles =

Doubles
- 2012 Büschl Open

Final
- Champions: (Switzerland) Romina Oprandi (Switzerland) Amra Sadiković
- Runners-up: (United States) Jill Craybas (Czech Republic) Eva Hrdinová
- Score: 4–6, 6–3, [10–7]

Events
Singles	Doubles
- Büschl Open

Kiki Bertens and Anne Keothavong were the defending champions, but Bertens chose not to participate. Keothavong partnered up with Alison Riske, but they lost in the first round to wildcards Antonia Lottner and Carina Witthöft.

Romina Oprandi and Amra Sadiković won the title, defeating Jill Craybas and Eva Hrdinová in the final, 4–6, 6–3, [10–7].

== Seeds ==
1. (Czech Republic) Eva Birnerová / (Slovenia) Andreja Klepač (semifinals)
2. (United States) Jill Craybas / (Czech Republic) Eva Hrdinová (final)
3. (Czech Republic) Karolína Plíšková / (Czech Republic) Kristýna Plíšková (first round)
4. (Ukraine) Lyudmyla Kichenok / (Ukraine) Nadiya Kichenok (semifinals)

== Draw ==
Key

- Q = Qualifier
- WC = Wild card
- LL = Lucky loser
- Alt = Alternate
- ITF = ITF entry
- PR = Protected ranking
- SR = Special ranking
- SE = Special exempt
- JE = Junior exempt
- JR = Junior Accelerator Programme entrant
- CO = College Accelerator Programme entrant
- NG = Next Gen Accelerator Program entrant
- w/o = Walkover
- r = Retired
- d = Defaulted

First round
1	(Czech Republic) E Birnerová (Slovenia) A Klepač	7	7^{10}
(Ukraine) Y Beygelzimer (Ukraine) K Kozlova	5	6^{8}
(Luxembourg) M Minella (Ukraine) E Svitolina	4	6	[6]
(Czech Republic) H Birnerová (Greece) E Daniilidou	6	3	[10]
3	(Czech Republic) Ka Plíšková (Czech Republic) Kr Plíšková	4	4
(Ukraine) I Buryachok (Russia) V Solovieva	6	6
(Switzerland) R Oprandi (Switzerland) A Sadiković	6	5	[10]
(Austria) S Klemenschits (Russia) M Melnikova	3	7	[3]
WC	(Germany) A Lottner (Germany) C Witthöft	6	7
(United Kingdom) A Keothavong (United States) A Riske	1	5
(Romania) C Mitu (Croatia) T Mrdeža	0	2
4	(Ukraine) L Kichenok (Ukraine) N Kichenok	6	6
(United States) M Brengle (United Kingdom) N Broady	6^{2}	6	[6]
WC	(Germany) A-L Friedsam (Germany) A Zaja	7^{7}	4	[10]
WC	(Germany) A Beck (Germany) D Pfizenmaier	4	1
2	(United States) J Craybas (Czech Republic) E Hrdinová	6	6

Quarterfinals
1	(Czech Republic) E Birnerová (Slovenia) A Klepač	6	6
(Czech Republic) H Birnerová (Greece) E Daniilidou	4	2
(Ukraine) I Buryachok (Russia) V Solovieva	6	3	[8]
(Switzerland) R Oprandi (Switzerland) A Sadiković	2	6	[10]
WC	(Germany) A Lottner (Germany) C Witthöft	4	4
4	(Ukraine) L Kichenok (Ukraine) N Kichenok	6	6
WC	(Germany) A-L Friedsam (Germany) A Zaja	3	3
2	(United States) J Craybas (Czech Republic) E Hrdinová	6	6

Semifinals
1	(Czech Republic) E Birnerová (Slovenia) A Klepač	6	4	[6]
(Switzerland) R Oprandi (Switzerland) A Sadiković	4	6	[10]
4	(Ukraine) L Kichenok (Ukraine) N Kichenok	4	2
2	(United States) J Craybas (Czech Republic) E Hrdinová	6	6

Finals
(Switzerland) R Oprandi (Switzerland) A Sadiković	4	6	[10]
2	(United States) J Craybas (Czech Republic) E Hrdinová	6	3	[7]
