= Yvonne Meusburger Garamszegi =

Austrian tennis player (born 1983)

Yvonne Meusburger
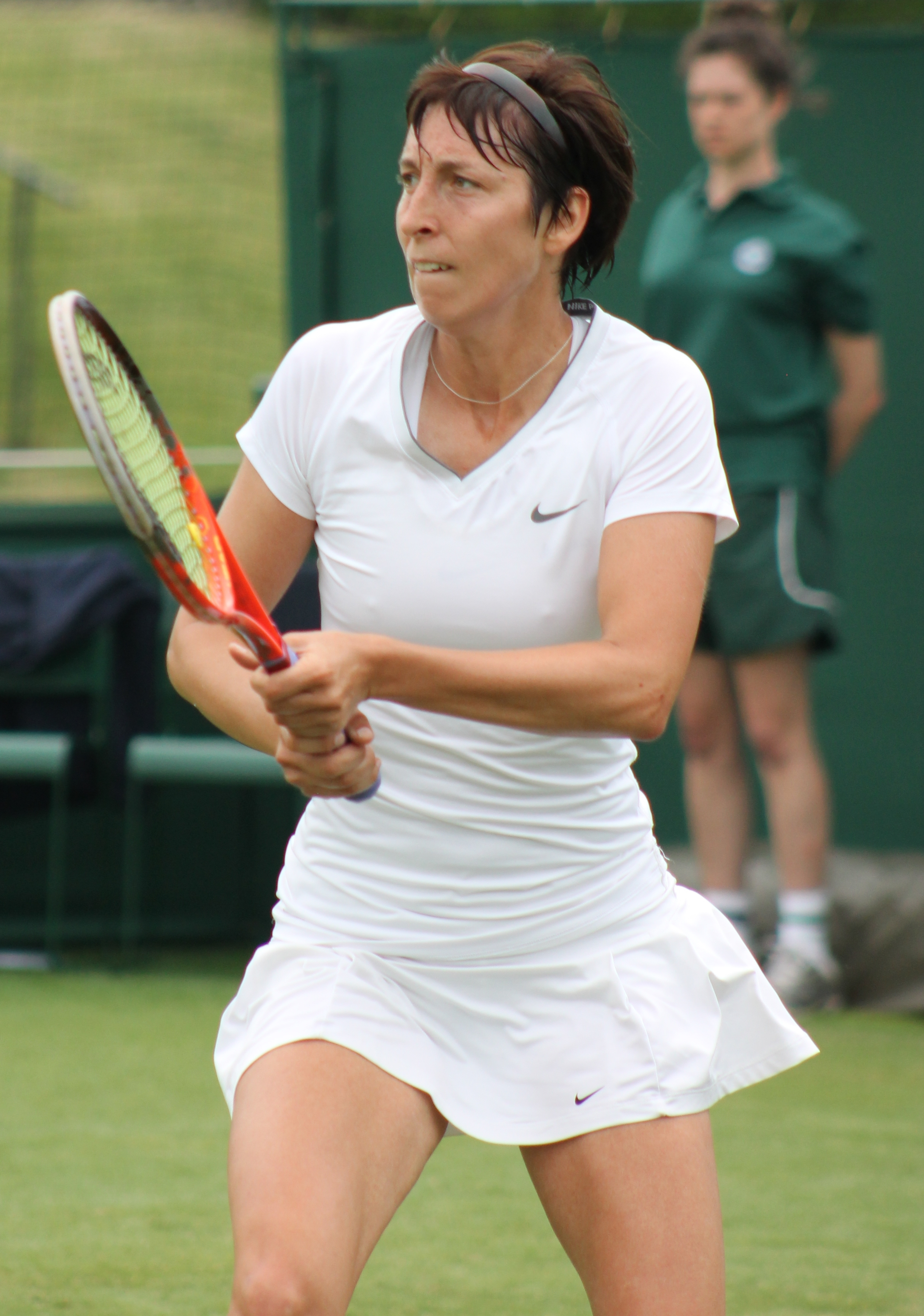
- Meusburger at the 2013 Wimbledon Championships
- Country (sports): Austria
- Residence: Schwarzach, Austria
- Born: 3 October 1983 (age 42) Dornbirn, Austria
- Height: 1.75 m (5 ft 9 in)
- Turned pro: 1999
- Retired: 2015
- Plays: Right-handed (two-handed backhand)
- Prize money: $1,384,838

Singles
- Career record: 439–316
- Career titles: 1 WTA, 15 ITF
- Highest ranking: No. 37 (31 March 2014)

Grand Slam singles results
- Australian Open: 3R (2014)
- French Open: 2R (2010, 2014)
- Wimbledon: 2R (2007, 2014)
- US Open: 2R (2008, 2010)

Doubles
- Career record: 104–103
- Career titles: 9 ITF
- Highest ranking: 104 (30 August 2010)

Grand Slam doubles results
- Australian Open: 1R (2008)
- French Open: 1R (2014)
- Wimbledon: 1R (2014)
- US Open: 1R (2007, 2013)

Yvonne Meusburger Garamszegi (née Meusburger, born 3 October 1983) is an Austrian retired tennis player.

Meusburger won one singles title on the WTA Tour, as well as fifteen singles and nine doubles titles on the ITF Circuit in her career. On 31 March 2014, she reached her highest singles ranking of world No. 37. On 30 August 2010, she peaked at No. 104 in the doubles rankings.

Playing for Austria in Fed Cup, Meusburger has accumulated a win–loss record of 8–21.

After getting married, she changed her surname to Meusburger Garamszegi.

== Tennis career ==
Meusburger made the second round of the 2010 Australian Open, French Open, and US Open. She lost to Russian Maria Kirilenko on all three occasions.

In June 2013, Meusburger entered the qualifying tournament of the Wimbledon Championships, defeating Nicole Gibbs, Tamarine Tanasugarn, and Sesil Karatantcheva for a spot in the main draw. She was drawn against fourth seed Agnieszka Radwańska and was knocked out in straight sets. Despite the loss, it was Meusburger's first Grand Slam appearance in nearly three years. The following month, she advanced to the final of the Budapest Grand Prix, beating three seeded players en route. However, she lost in the final to third seed Simona Halep in three sets. Meusburger consequently re-entered the top 100 and overtook Tamira Paszek to become Austria's top-ranked women's player.

In July 2013, she won her first WTA singles title in Bad Gastein, defeating Andrea Hlaváčková. This win, along with a successful end to the 2013 season, meant that, at the age of 30, Meusburger's ranking moved into the world's top 50 for the first time in her career.

Ranked 49 in the world, Meusburger reached the third round of a Grand Slam tournament for the first time in her career at the 2014 Australian Open. En route, she defeated Chanelle Scheepers and 33rd seed Bojana Jovanovski. In the third round, she was defeated by second seed Victoria Azarenka.

Logging quarterfinal appearances in Katowice and Marrakech, Meusburger entered the 2014 French Open with confidence, recording a three-set win over French wildcard Amandine Hesse in the first round. She would progress no further; however, as she was eliminated by 2010 finalist Samantha Stosur in their second round encounter.

Meusburger continued her resurgence at the 2014 Wimbledon Championships. Having defeated Vania King at the first hurdle, she advanced to the second round but was defeated there by Li Na.

Meusburger returned to defend her title at the 2014 Gastein Ladies and started off well when she defeated qualifier Tereza Smitková in a match lasting nearly three hours. However, she was unable to follow the win up and was beaten in the second round by Chanelle Scheepers of South Africa. It was Meusburger's least successful performance ever in Bad Gastein, as she had reached the quarterfinals or better of the tournament since its debut in 2007.

Meusburger played her last professional match at the 2014 US Open, announcing her retirement following a first-round loss to Karolína Plíšková of the Czech Republic.

In December 2014, Meusburger announced that she would come out of retirement to play one more tournament—the 2015 Australian Open—telling the Austria Press Agency that she wanted to end her career at the tournament because it was the first Grand Slam she contested was the 2006 Australian Open.

Meusburger played her final career-match against 29th seed Australian Casey Dellacqua at the following 2015 Australian Open. She lost 4–6, 0–6.

== Playing style ==
Meusburger is fit and an excellent mover, often outlasting her opponents during matches. She uses her compact groundstrokes to consistently hit flat groundstrokes and positions the ball well. Her weak serve has been a major hindrance throughout her career, especially against top players, whom are able to attack her serve and place her in a defensive position. However, Meusburger is an excellent returner, winning the most points for first-serve returns during the 2013 season; she was also in the top 10 for second-serve returns and return games won. Meusburger has enjoyed her greatest success on clay courts, having reached three WTA finals on this particular surface.

== Grand Slam performance timelines ==
Key
W	F	SF	QF	#R	RR	Q#	P#	DNQ	A	Z#	PO	G	S	B	NMS	NTI	P	NH

(W) winner; (F) finalist; (SF) semifinalist; (QF) quarterfinalist; (#R) rounds 4, 3, 2, 1; (RR) round-robin stage; (Q#) qualification round; (P#) preliminary round; (DNQ) did not qualify; (A) absent; (Z#) Davis/Fed Cup Zonal Group (with number indication) or (PO) play-off; (G) gold, (S) silver or (B) bronze Olympic/Paralympic medal; (NMS) not a Masters tournament; (NTI) not a Tier I tournament; (P) postponed; (NH) not held; (SR) strike rate (events won / competed); (W–L) win–loss record.
To avoid confusion and double counting, these charts are updated at the conclusion of a tournament or when the player's participation has ended.

=== Singles ===
Tournament	2005	2006	2007	2008	2009	2010	2011	2012	2013	2014	2015	W–L
Australian Open	Q1	1R	Q2	2R	1R	2R	A	Q3	A	3R	1R	3–5
French Open	1R	Q1	1R	1R	1R	2R	Q2	Q2	Q3	2R	A	2–6
Wimbledon	Q2	Q1	2R	1R	Q2	1R	Q2	Q2	1R	2R	A	2–5
US Open	Q2	Q1	1R	2R	1R	2R	Q1	Q2	1R	1R	A	2–6
Win–loss	0–1	0–1	1–3	1–3	0–3	3–4	0–0	0–0	0–2	4–4	0–1	9–22

=== Doubles ===
Tournament	2007	2008	2010	2013	2014	W–L
Australian Open	A	1R	A	A	1R	0–2
French Open	A	A	A	A	1R	0–1
Wimbledon	A	A	Q1	A	1R	0–1
US Open	1R	A	A	1R	1R	0–3
Win–loss	0–1	0–1	0–0	0–1	0–4	0–7

== WTA career finals ==
=== Singles: 3 (1 title, 2 runner-ups) ===
Legend Grand Slam Premier M & Premier 5 Premier International (1–2)	Finals by surface Hard (0–0) Grass (0–0) Clay (1–2) Carpet (0–0)

Result	W–L	Date	Tournament	Tier	Surface	Opponent	Score
Loss	0–1	Jul 2007	Gastein Ladies, Austria	Tier III (Note: In 2009, the WTA Tier II tournaments were reclassified as WTA Premier tournaments, while the WTA Tier III tournaments, WTA Tier IV tournaments and WTA Tier V tournaments were reclassified as WTA International tournaments.)	Clay	(Italy) Francesca Schiavone	1–6, 4–6
Loss	0–2	Jul 2013	Budapest Grand Prix, Hungary	International	Clay	(Romania) Simona Halep	3–6, 7–6^{(9–7)}, 1–6
Win	1–2	Jul 2013	Gastein Ladies, Austria	International	Clay	(Czech Republic) Andrea Hlaváčková	7–5, 6–2

== ITF Circuit finals ==
=== Singles: 26 (15 titles, 11 runner-ups) ===
Legend
$100,000 tournaments
$75,000 tournaments (0–1)
$50,000 tournaments (2–5)
$25,000 tournaments (12–4)
$10,000 tournaments (1–1)

Result	W–L	Date	Tournament	Tier	Surface	Opponent	Score
Win	1–0	Sep 2003	ITF Sunderland, UK	10,000	Hard (i)	(Sweden) Hanna Nooni	4–6, 6–3, 6–1
Loss	1–1	Jun 2004	ITF Vaduz, Liechtenstein	25,000	Clay	(Australia) Anastasia Rodionova	6–1, 3–6, 6–7
Win	2–1	Aug 2004	ITF Balashikha, Russia	25,000	Clay	(Belarus) Anastasiya Yakimova	6–3, 6–7, 6–0
Win	3–1	Nov 2004	ITF Sint-Katelijne-Waver, Belgium	25,000	Hard (i)	(Tunisia) Selima Sfar	6–4, 6–3
Win	4–1	Mar 2005	ITF San Luis Potosí, Mexico	25,000	Clay	(Hungary) Kira Nagy	7–5, 5–7, 6–3
Win	5–1	Apr 2005	ITF Coatzacoalcos, Mexico	25,000	Hard	(Japan) Shiho Hisamatsu	3–6, 6–4, 6–3
Loss	5–2	Mar 2006	ITF Orange, United States	50,000	Hard	(Ukraine) Alona Bondarenko	3–6, 5–7
Loss	5–3	Sep 2006	ITF Innsbruck, Austria	10,000	Clay	(Austria) Patricia Mayr-Achleitner	6–1, 2–6, 2–2 ret.
Loss	5–4	Nov 2006	ITF Mexico City	25,000	Hard	(France) Mathilde Johansson	5–7, 2–6
Win	6–4	Nov 2006	ITF Mexico City	25,000	Clay	(Germany) Carmen Klaschka	6–3, 6–4
Win	7–4	Nov 2006	ITF Puebla, Mexico	25,000	Hard	(Croatia) Maria Abramović	6–4, 6–2
Win	8–4	Feb 2007	ITF Biberach, Germany	25,000	Hard (i)	(Germany) Martina Pavelec	7–6, 4–6, 7–5
Win	9–4	Apr 2007	ITF Latina, Italy	50,000	Clay	(Denmark) Caroline Wozniacki	7–5, 4–6, 6–3
Loss	9–5	Jun 2008	ITF Rome, Italy	50,000	Clay	(Italy) Tathiana Garbin	4–6, 6–4, 6–7
Loss	9–6	Jul 2008	Zagreb Ladies Open, Croatia	75,000	Clay	(Croatia) Petra Martić	2–6, 6–2, 2–6
Win	10–6	Aug 2009	Ladies Open Hechingen, Germany	25,000	Clay	(Sweden) Johanna Larsson	5–7, 7–5, 6–2
Win	11–6	Aug 2009	ITF Trnava, Slovakia	25,000	Clay	(Czech Republic) Sandra Záhlavová	7–6, 7–5
Loss	11–7	Apr 2009	ITF Mestre, Italy	50,000	Hard	(Croatia) Karolina Šprem	6–2, 2–6, 4–6
Win	12–7	Aug 2011	Empire Slovak Open, Slovakia	50,000	Clay	(Bulgaria) Elitsa Kostova	0–6, 6–2, 6–0
Loss	12–8	Oct 2011	GB Pro-Series Glasgow, UK	25,000	Hard	(France) Claire Feuerstein	3–6, 1–6
Loss	12–9	Nov 2011	Ismaning Open, Germany	50,000	Carpet (i)	(United Kingdom) Anne Keothavong	3–6, 6–1, 2–6
Loss	12–10	May 2012	ITF Grado, Italy	25,000	Clay	(Italy) Maria Elena Camerin	2–6, 3–6
Loss	12–11	Jul 2012	ITF Contrexéville, France	50,000	Clay	(France) Aravane Rezaï	3–6, 6–2, 3–6
Win	13–11	Apr 2013	ITF La Marsa, Tunisia	25,000	Clay	(Russia) Victoria Kan	6–3, 6–4
Win	14–11	May 2013	Wiesbaden Open, Germany	25,000	Clay	(Canada) Sharon Fichman	5–7, 6–4, 6–1
Win	15–11	Jun 2013	ITF Grado, Italy	25,000	Clay	(Poland) Katarzyna Piter	6–2, 6–7, 6–3

=== Doubles: 17 (9 titles, 8 runner-ups) ===
Legend
$100,000 tournaments (2–0)
$75,000 tournaments (2–0)
$50,000 tournaments (1–3)
$25,000 tournaments (2–4)
$10,000 tournaments (2–1)

Result	W–L	Date	Tournament	Tier	Surface	Partner	Opponents	Score
Loss	0–1	May 2002	ITF Rijeka, Croatia	10,000	Clay	(Austria) Jenny Zika	(Czech Republic) Gabriela Chmelinová (Czech Republic) Dominika Luzarová	3–6, 6–3, 3–6
Win	1–1	Aug 2003	ITF Oulu, Finland	10,000	Clay	(Austria) Nicole Melch	(Ukraine) Kateryna Bondarenko (Latvia) Irina Kuzmina-Rimša	6–3, 4–6, 6–1
Loss	1–2	Oct 2003	ITF Jersey, Great Britain	25,000	Hard	(Sweden) Hanna Nooni	(Sweden) Sofia Arvidsson (Estonia) Kaia Kanepi	3–6, 5–7
Win	2–2	Sep 2006	ITF Innsbruck, Austria	10,000	Clay	(Austria) Patricia Mayr-Achleitner	(Czech Republic) Hana Birnerová (Czech Republic) Zuzana Zálabská	6–3, 6–3
Loss	2–3	Nov 2006	ITF Mexico City	25,000	Hard	(Austria) Patricia Mayr-Achleitner	(Argentina) María José Argeri (Brazil) Letícia Sobral	4–6, 2–6
Win	3–3	Apr 2007	Dinan Open, France	75,000	Clay (i)	(Germany) Angelique Kerber	(France) Stéphanie Foretz (France) Aurélie Védy	6–4, 6–7^{(6)}, 6–2
Loss	3–4	Feb 2009	ITF Biberach, Germany	50,000	Hard (i)	(Germany) Kristina Barrois	(Austria) Melanie Klaffner (Austria) Sandra Klemenschits	6–3, 4–6, [15–17]
Win	4–4	Jul 2009	ITF Contrexéville, France	50,000	Clay	(Germany) Kathrin Wörle-Scheller	(France) Stéphanie Cohen-Aloro (France) Pauline Parmentier	6–2, 6–2
Win	5–4	Aug 2009	Ladies Open Hechingen, Germany	25,000	Clay	(Germany) Jasmin Wöhr	(Argentina) Erica Krauth (Sweden) Hanna Nooni	6–2, 7–6^{(1)}
Loss	5–5	Sep 2009	Mestre, Italy	50,000	Clay	(Germany) Kristina Barrois	(Switzerland) Romina Oprandi (Austria) Sandra Klemenschits	4–6, 1–6
Win	6–5	Sep 2009	GB Pro-Series Shrewsbury, UK	75,000	Hard (i)	(Germany) Kristina Barrois	(Sweden) Johanna Larsson (United Kingdom) Anna Smith	3–6, 6–4, [10–7]
Loss	6–6	Feb 2010	ITF Stockholm, Sweden	25,000	Hard (i)	(Austria) Nikola Hofmanova	(Belarus) Ksenia Milevskaya (Ukraine) Lesia Tsurenko	4–6, 5–7
Win	7–6	Jun 2010	Open de Marseille, France	100,000	Clay	(Sweden) Johanna Larsson	(France) Stéphanie Cohen-Aloro (France) Aurélie Védy	6–4, 6–2
Win	8–6	Aug 2010	Bronx Open, United States	100,000	Hard	(Germany) Kristina Barrois	(South Africa) Natalie Grandin (United States) Abigail Spears	1–6, 6–4, [15–13]
Win	9–6	Apr 2011	ITF Chiasso, Switzerland	25,000	Clay	(Germany) Kathrin Wörle-Scheller	(France) Claire Feuerstein (France) Anaïs Laurendon	6–3, 6–3
Loss	9–7	Oct 2011	GB Pro-Series Glasgow, UK	25,000	Hard (i)	(Liechtenstein) Stephanie Vogt	(Finland) Emma Laine (France) Kristina Mladenovic	2–6, 4–6
Loss	9–8	Nov 2011	Ismaning Open, Germany	50,000	Hard (i)	(Germany) Kristina Barrois	(Netherlands) Kiki Bertens (United Kingdom) Anne Keothavong	3–6, 3–6
